= 2022–23 Venezia FC season =

Venezia FC
2022–23 season
- Chairman: Duncan L. Niederauer
- Manager: Ivan Javorčić (until 31 October); Paolo Vanoli (from 7 November)
- Stadium: Stadio Pier Luigi Penzo
- Serie B: 8th
- Coppa Italia: Round of 64
- Top goalscorer: League: Joel Pohjanpalo (19); All: Joel Pohjanpalo (19)
Home colours	Away colours	Third colours

The 2022–23 season was the 116th in the history of Venezia FC and their first season back in the second division since 2021. The club participated in Serie B and the Coppa Italia.

== Players ==
As of 27 January 2023

Note: Flags indicate national team as defined under FIFA eligibility rules; some limited exceptions apply. Players may hold more than one non-FIFA nationality.

No.	Pos.	Nation	Player
1	GK	FIN	Niki Mäenpää
5	DF	SUR	Ridgeciano Haps
6	MF	USA	Gianluca Busio
7	DF	ITA	Francesco Zampano
8	MF	USA	Tanner Tessmann
10	MF	FRA	Michaël Cuisance
11	FW	USA	Andrija Novakovich
12	GK	BRA	Bruno Bertinato
13	DF	ITA	Marco Modolo (captain)
14	MF	USA	Jack de Vries
16	MF	ITA	Luca Fiordilino
17	FW	NOR	Dennis Johnsen
18	MF	BIH	Mato Jajalo
20	FW	FIN	Joel Pohjanpalo
21	MF	RUS	Denis Cheryshev
23	DF	ITA	Luca Ceppitelli

No.	Pos.	Nation	Player
25	FW	ITA	Nicholas Pierini
27	DF	ITA	Antonio Candela
28	MF	USA	Patrick Leal
30	DF	AUT	Michael Svoboda
32	DF	ITA	Pietro Ceccaroni (3rd captain)
38	MF	DEN	Magnus Kofod Andersen
66	GK	FIN	Jesse Joronen
88	MF	CAN	Damiano Pecile
—	DF	ITA	Andrea Beghetto (on loan from Pisa)
—	DF	BUL	Petko Hristov (on loan from Spezia)
—	MF	ISL	Mikael Egill Ellertsson
—	FW	ITA	Riccardo Ciervo (on loan from Sassuolo)
—	FW	SEN	Babacar Diop
—	FW	NOR	Mikael Tørset Johnsen
—	FW	ISL	Óttar Magnús Karlsson

=== Out on loan ===
As of 27 January 2023

Note: Flags indicate national team as defined under FIFA eligibility rules; some limited exceptions apply. Players may hold more than one non-FIFA nationality.

No.	Pos.	Nation	Player
—	GK	ITA	Filippo Neri (at Feralpisalò until 30 June 2023)
—	GK	ITA	Riccardo Pigozzo (at Arzignano until 30 June 2023)
—	DF	MDA	Iurie Iovu (at Istra 1961 until 30 June 2023)
—	DF	AUT	Maximilian Ullmann (at Magdeburg until 30 June 2023)
—	DF	ARG	Facundo Zabala (at Olimpia until 31 December 2023)

No.	Pos.	Nation	Player
—	MF	ITA	Mattia Aramu (at Genoa until 30 June 2023)
—	MF	ISL	Bjarki Steinn Bjarkason (at Foggia until 30 June 2023)
—	MF	SLO	Domen Črnigoj (at Salernitana until 30 June 2023)
—	MF	SLO	Aaron Kačinari (at Kastrioti until 30 June 2023)
—	MF	ITA	Domenico Rossi (at Pro Patria until 30 June 2023)

== Pre-season and friendlies ==
Win Draw Loss Fixtures

3 August 2022 Friendly	Venezia (Italy)	0–1	(Italy) Cesena	Venice
18:00 CEST (UTC+2)			Chiarello 28'	Stadium: Stadio Pier Luigi Penzo; Referee: Alessandro Prontera

7 January 2023 Friendly	Bayer Leverkusen (Germany)	2–1	(Italy) Venezia	Leverkusen, Germany
15:00 CET (UTC+1)	Wirtz 37'; Adli 44'		Novakovich 68'	Stadium: BayArena; Attendance: 1,400; Referee: Mitja Stegemann (Germany)

== Competitions ==
=== Overall record ===
Competition	First match	Last match	Starting round	Final position	Record							
Competition	First match	Last match	Starting round	Final position	Pld	W	D	L	GF	GA	GD	Win %
Serie B	14 August 2022	19 May 2023	Matchday 1	8th	38	13	10	15	51	50	+1	34.21
Coppa Italia	7 August 2022		Round of 64		1	0	0	1	2	3	−1	0.00
Total					39	13	10	16	53	53	+0	33.33

Source: Soccerway

=== Serie B ===
==== League table ====
Pos	Team	Pld	W	D	L	GF	GA	GD	Pts	Promotion, qualification or relegation
6	Südtirol	38	14	16	8	38	34	+4	58	Qualification for promotion play-offs preliminary round
7	Reggina (Note: Reggina were deducted five points for failing to pay taxes and player salaries on time. The deduction was initially seven points; later relegated to Serie D after enduring serious financial difficulties for several years. Brescia was readmitted into Serie B.) (E)	38	17	4	17	49	45	+4	50	Revival in Serie D
8	Venezia	38	13	10	15	51	50	+1	49	Qualification for promotion play-offs preliminary round
9	Palermo	38	11	16	11	48	49	−1	49	
10	Modena	38	13	9	16	47	53	−6	48	

Source: Soccerway (in English)
Rules for classification: 1) Points; 2) Head-to-head points; 3) Head-to-head goal difference; 4) Goal difference; 5) Goals scored; 6) Draw.
(E) Eliminated

==== Results summary ====
Overall								Home						Away					
Pld	W	D	L	GF	GA	GD	Pts	W	D	L	GF	GA	GD	W	D	L	GF	GA	GD
38	13	10	15	51	50	+1	49	7	5	7	29	27	+2	6	5	8	22	23	−1

Source: Serie B

==== Results by round ====
Round	1	2	3	4	5	6	7	8	9	10	11	12	13	14	15	16	17	18	19	20	21	22	23	24	25	26	27	28	29	30	31	32	33	34	35	36	37	38
Ground	H	A	A	H	A	H	A	H	H	A	H	A	H	A	H	A	H	A	H	A	H	H	A	H	A	H	A	A	H	A	H	A	H	A	H	A	H	A
Result	L	W	D	L	L	D	W	L	L	D	L	L	L	W	W	D	W	L	D	L	L	D	W	W	D	D	L	L	D	W	W	L	W	W	W	D	W	L
Position	15	9	11	14	16	16	13	16	16	17	18	19	19	19	18	18	15	16	17	18	18	19	18	13	15	16	16	16	16	16	14	14	14	14	10	10	7	8

Source: Serie B
A = Away; H = Home; W = Win; D = Draw; L = Loss

==== Matches ====
The league fixtures were announced on 15 July 2022.

14 August 2022 1	Venezia	1–2	Genoa	Venice
20:45 CEST (UTC+2)	Johnsen 68'	Report	Portanova 37'; Yeboah 87'	Stadium: Stadio Pier Luigi Penzo; Attendance: 5263; Referee: Massimiliano Irrati

21 August 2022 2	Südtirol	1–2	Venezia	Bolzano
20:45 CEST (UTC+2)	Odogwu 60'	Report	Cuisance 83'; Curto (o.g.) 90+5'	Stadium: Stadio Marco Druso; Attendance: 3508; Referee: Niccolò Baroni

=== Coppa Italia ===
7 August 2022 Round of 64	Venezia	2–3	Ascoli	Venice
17:45 CEST (UTC+2)	Rémy (yellow card) 42'; Sandberg (yellow card) 51'; Hasanbegovic (yellow card) 51'; Mikaelsson 88', 89'	Report	Lungoyi (yellow card) 33'; Šarić 36'; Falzerano 70'; Fontana 90+1'	Stadium: Stadio Pier Luigi Penzo; Referee: Daniele Paterna
