= 2021–22 Venezia FC season =

Venezia
2021–22 season
- Chairman: Duncan L. Niederauer
- Manager: Paolo Zanetti (until 27 April); Andrea Soncin (caretaker, from 27 April)
- Stadium: Stadio Pier Luigi Penzo
- Serie A: 20th (relegated)
- Coppa Italia: Round of 16
- Top goalscorer: League: Thomas Henry (9); All: Thomas Henry (9)
| Home colours | Away colours | Third colours |

The 2021–22 season was the 115th season in the existence of Venezia F.C. and the club's first season back in the top flight of Italian football since 2001–02. In addition to the domestic league, Venezia participated in this season's edition of the Coppa Italia.

== Players ==
=== First-team squad ===
As of 3 January 2022

Note: Flags indicate national team as defined under FIFA eligibility rules; some limited exceptions apply. Players may hold more than one non-FIFA nationality.

| No. | Pos. | Nation | Player |
|---|---|---|---|
| 1 | GK | FIN | Niki Mäenpää |
| 3 | DF | ITA | Cristian Molinaro (vice-captain) |
| 5 | MF | ITA | Antonio Junior Vacca |
| 7 | MF | ITA | Pasquale Mazzocchi |
| 8 | MF | USA | Tanner Tessmann |
| 9 | FW | ITA | Francesco Forte |
| 10 | MF | ITA | Mattia Aramu |
| 11 | MF | ISL | Arnór Sigurðsson (on loan from CSKA Moscow) |
| 12 | GK | ITA | Luca Lezzerini |
| 13 | DF | ITA | Marco Modolo (captain) |
| 14 | FW | FRA | Thomas Henry |
| 17 | FW | NOR | Dennis Johnsen |
| 18 | MF | BEL | Daan Heymans |
| 19 | FW | ISL | Bjarki Steinn Bjarkason |
| 20 | MF | POR | Nani |

| No. | Pos. | Nation | Player |
|---|---|---|---|
| 21 | MF | FRA | Michaël Cuisance |
| 22 | DF | NGR | Tyronne Ebuehi (on loan from Benfica) |
| 23 | MF | MAR | Sofian Kiyine (on loan from Lazio) |
| 27 | MF | USA | Gianluca Busio |
| 28 | DF | AUT | David Schnegg |
| 30 | DF | AUT | Michael Svoboda |
| 31 | DF | ITA | Mattia Caldara (on loan from Milan) |
| 32 | DF | ITA | Pietro Ceccaroni (3rd captain) |
| 33 | MF | SLO | Domen Črnigoj |
| 42 | MF | ISR | Dor Peretz |
| 44 | DF | WAL | Ethan Ampadu (on loan from Chelsea) |
| 55 | DF | SUR | Ridgeciano Haps |
| 77 | FW | NGR | David Okereke (on loan from Club Brugge) |
| 88 | GK | ARG | Sergio Romero |
| 91 | GK | ITA | Filippo Neri |

=== Other players under contract ===
Include players not registered for current season.

As of 17 October 2021

Note: Flags indicate national team as defined under FIFA eligibility rules; some limited exceptions apply. Players may hold more than one non-FIFA nationality.

| No. | Pos. | Nation | Player |
|---|---|---|---|
| — | GK | BRA | Bruno Bertinato |
| — | MF | FIN | Lauri Ala-Myllymäki |
| — | MF | ITA | Jacopo Dezi |
| — | MF | ITA | Luca Fiordilino |

| No. | Pos. | Nation | Player |
|---|---|---|---|
| — | FW | ITA | Riccardo Bocalon |
| — | FW | ITA | Nicolò Simeoni |
| — | FW | ITA | Gianmarco Zigoni |

=== Out on loan ===
As of 7 January 2022

Note: Flags indicate national team as defined under FIFA eligibility rules; some limited exceptions apply. Players may hold more than one non-FIFA nationality.

| No. | Pos. | Nation | Player |
|---|---|---|---|
| — | GK | ITA | Riccardo Pigozzo (at Seregno until 30 June 2022) |
| — | DF | ITA | Mario De Marino (at Fidelis Andria until 30 June 2022) |
| — | DF | ITA | Gian Filippo Felicioli (at Ascoli until 30 June 2022) |
| — | MF | ITA | Nicolas Galazzi (at Triestina until 30 June 2022) |
| — | MF | ITA | Domenico Rossi (at Vis Pesaro until 30 June 2022) |

| No. | Pos. | Nation | Player |
|---|---|---|---|
| — | MF | ITA | Filippo Serena (at Grosseto until 30 June 2022) |
| — | MF | SCO | Harvey St Clair (at Seregno until 30 June 2022) |
| — | FW | BIH | Mirza Hasanbegovic (at Kallithea until 30 June 2022) |
| — | FW | ISL | Óttar Magnús Karlsson (at Siena until 30 June 2022) |

== Transfers ==
=== In ===
| No. | Pos | Player | Transferred from | Fee | Date | Source |
|---|---|---|---|---|---|---|
| 28 | DF | (Austria) David Schnegg | (Austria) LASK | Undisclosed | 11 June 2021 | |
| 42 | MF | (Israel) Dor Peretz | (Israel) Maccabi Tel Aviv | Undisclosed | 16 June 2021 | |
| 22 | DF | (Nigeria) Tyronne Ebuehi | (Portugal) Benfica | Loan | 28 June 2021 | |
| 8 | MF | (United States) Tanner Tessmann | (United States) FC Dallas | Undisclosed | 15 July 2021 | |
| 11 | MF | (Iceland) Arnór Sigurðsson | (Russia) CSKA Moscow | Loan | 30 July 2021 | |
| 27 | MF | (United States) Gianluca Busio | (United States) Sporting Kansas City | Undisclosed | 9 August 2021 | |
| 31 | DF | (Italy) Mattia Caldara | (Italy) Milan | Loan | 9 August 2021 | |
| 77 | FW | (Nigeria) David Okereke | (Belgium) Club Brugge | Loan | 12 August 2021 | |
| 14 | FW | (France) Thomas Henry | (Belgium) OH Leuven | Undisclosed | 24 August 2021 | |
| 55 | DF | (Suriname) Ridgeciano Haps | (Netherlands) Feyenoord | Undisclosed | 31 August 2021 | |
| 44 | DF | (Wales) Ethan Ampadu | (England) Chelsea | Loan | 31 August 2021 | |
| | MF | (United States) Jack de Vries | (United States) Philadelphia Union | Loan | 31 August 2021 | |
| 88 | GK | (Argentina) Sergio Romero | Unattached (Note: Most recently played for Manchester United.) | | 11 October 2021 | |
| 21 | MF | (France) Michaël Cuisance | (Germany) Bayern Munich | €4,500,000 | 3 January 2022 | |

== Pre-season and friendlies ==
Win Draw Loss Fixtures

| 31 July 2021 Friendly | Utrecht (Netherlands) | 2–3 | (Italy) Venezia | Utrecht, Netherlands |
| 16:00 CEST (UTC+2) | Van den Berg (yellow card); Benamar (yellow card); Van der Kust (yellow card); Gustafson 7' (pen.), 75' (pen.) | | Aramu (yellow card) , (goal) 12'; Forte 20'; Di Mariano 85' (pen.) | Stadium: Stadion Galgenwaard; Attendance: 0 Referee: Thomas Hardeman |

| 3 August 2021 Friendly | Twente (Netherlands) | 0–1 | (Italy) Venezia | Enschede, Netherlands |
| 15:00 CEST (UTC+2) | | | Heymans 65' | Stadium: De Grolsch Veste |

| 6 August 2021 Friendly | Groningen (Netherlands) | 0–0 | (Italy) Venezia | Groningen, Netherlands |
| 18:30 CEST (UTC+2) | | | | Stadium: Euroborg |

| 4 September 2021 Friendly | Brescia (Italy) | 4–0 | (Italy) Venezia | Brescia, Italy |
| 17:00 CEST (UTC+2) | Bisoli 13'; Moreo 40'; Bajić 83'; Jagiełło 87' | | | Stadium: Stadio Mario Rigamonti |

| 13 November 2021 Friendly | Tabor Sežana (Slovenia) | 2–1 | (Italy) Venezia | Sežana, Slovenia |
| 13:00 CET (UTC+1) | Stančič 24'; Keita 88' | | Sigurðsson 9' (pen.) | Stadium: Rajko Štolfa Stadium |

== Competitions ==
=== Overall record ===
| Competition | First match | Last match | Starting round | Final position | Record | | | | | | | |
| Competition | First match | Last match | Starting round | Final position | Pld | W | D | L | GF | GA | GD | Win % |
|---|---|---|---|---|---|---|---|---|---|---|---|---|
| Serie A | 22 August 2021 | 22 May 2022 | Matchday 1 | 20th | 38 | 6 | 9 | 23 | 34 | 69 | −35 | 15.79 |
| Coppa Italia | 15 August 2021 | 12 January 2022 | First round | Round of 16 | 3 | 1 | 1 | 1 | 4 | 4 | +0 | 33.33 |
| Total | | | | | 41 | 7 | 10 | 24 | 38 | 73 | −35 | 17.07 |

Last updated: 22 May 2022
Source: Soccerway

=== Serie A ===
==== League table ====
| Pos | Team | Pld | W | D | L | GF | GA | GD | Pts | Qualification or relegation |
|---|---|---|---|---|---|---|---|---|---|---|
| 16 | Spezia | 38 | 10 | 6 | 22 | 41 | 71 | −30 | 36 | |
| 17 | Salernitana | 38 | 7 | 10 | 21 | 33 | 78 | −45 | 31 | |
| 18 | Cagliari (R) | 38 | 6 | 12 | 20 | 34 | 68 | −34 | 30 | Relegation to Serie B |
| 19 | Genoa (R) | 38 | 4 | 16 | 18 | 27 | 60 | −33 | 28 | Relegation to Serie B |
| 20 | Venezia (R) | 38 | 6 | 9 | 23 | 34 | 69 | −35 | 27 | Relegation to Serie B |

Source: Serie A
Rules for classification: 1) Points; 2) Head-to-head points; 3) Head-to-head goal difference; 4) Goal difference; 5) Goals scored; 6) Draw. (Note: Head-to-head record is used only after all the matches between the teams in question have been played)
(R) Relegated

==== Results summary ====
| Overall | | | | | | | | Home | | | | | | Away | | | | | |
| Pld | W | D | L | GF | GA | GD | Pts | W | D | L | GF | GA | GD | W | D | L | GF | GA | GD |
|---|---|---|---|---|---|---|---|---|---|---|---|---|---|---|---|---|---|---|---|
| 38 | 6 | 9 | 23 | 34 | 69 | −35 | 27 | 3 | 5 | 11 | 21 | 38 | −17 | 3 | 4 | 12 | 13 | 31 | −18 |

Last updated: 22 May 2022.
Source: Serie A

==== Results by round ====
| Round | 1 | 2 | 3 | 4 | 5 | 6 | 7 | 8 | 9 | 10 | 11 | 12 | 13 | 14 | 15 | 16 | 17 | 18 | 19 | 20 | 21 | 22 | 23 | 24 | 25 | 26 | 27 | 28 | 29 | 30 | 31 | 32 | 33 | 34 | 35 | 36 | 37 | 38 |
|---|---|---|---|---|---|---|---|---|---|---|---|---|---|---|---|---|---|---|---|---|---|---|---|---|---|---|---|---|---|---|---|---|---|---|---|---|---|---|
| Ground | A | A | A | H | A | H | A | H | A | H | A | H | A | H | A | H | H | A | H | A | H | H | A | H | A | H | A | H | A | H | A | H | A | H | A | H | A | H |
| Result | L | L | W | L | L | D | D | W | L | L | D | W | W | L | L | L | D | D | L | L | L | D | L | L | W | D | L | L | L | L | L | L | L | L | L | W | D | D |
| Position | 19 | 20 | 14 | 17 | 18 | 18 | 17 | 15 | 16 | 16 | 16 | 15 | 14 | 16 | 16 | 16 | 16 | 16 | 16 | 16 | 17 | 17 | 17 | 18 | 18 | 18 | 18 | 18 | 18 | 19 | 18 | 19 | 19 | 20 | 20 | 20 | 20 | 20 |

Updated to match(es) played on 22 May 2022. Source: Serie A
A = Away; H = Home; W = Win; D = Draw; L = Loss

==== Matches ====
The league fixtures were announced on 14 July 2021.

| 22 August 2021 1 | Napoli | 2–0 | Venezia | Naples |
| 20:45 CEST (UTC+2) | Osimhen (red card) 23'; Fabián (yellow card) 52'; Insigne (penalty missed) 56', 62' (pen.); Elmas 73' | Report | Fiordilino (yellow card) 12'; Caldara (yellow card) 30'; Heymans (yellow card) 38'; Ebuehi (yellow card) 45+1'; Forte (yellow card) 50'; Ceccaroni (yellow card) 61'; Tessmann (yellow card) 75' | Stadium: Stadio San Paolo; Attendance: 18,299; Referee: Gianluca Aureliano |

| 27 August 2021 2 | Udinese | 3–0 | Venezia | Udine |
| 18:30 CEST (UTC+2) | Pussetto 29'; Deulofeu 70'; Samir (yellow card) 73'; Okaka (yellow card) 85'; Molina 90+3' | Report | Heymans (yellow card) 52'; Vacca (yellow card) 77'; Schnegg (yellow card) 90' | Stadium: Stadio Friuli; Attendance: 8,274; Referee: Livio Marinelli |

| 11 September 2021 3 | Empoli | 1–2 | Venezia | Empoli |
| 15:00 CEST (UTC+2) | Ismajli (yellow card) 7'; Haas (yellow card) 44'; Bajrami 89' (pen.) | Report | Henry 13'; Aramu (yellow card) 15'; Lezzerini (yellow card) 35'; Johnsen (yellow card) 45+3'; Okereke 68'; Heymans (yellow card) 86'; Mäenpää (yellow card) 88' | Stadium: Stadio Carlo Castellani; Attendance: 2,511; Referee: Antonio Rapuano |

| 19 September 2021 4 | Venezia | 1–2 | Spezia | Venice |
| 15:00 CEST (UTC+2) | Mazzocchi (yellow card) 26'; Vacca (yellow card) 57'; Ceccaroni 59'; Busio (yellow card) 69'; Heymans (yellow card) 84' | Report | Bastoni 13'; Ferrer (yellow card) 47'; Bourabia 90+4' | Stadium: Stadio Pier Luigi Penzo; Attendance: 3,688; Referee: Rosario Abisso |

| 22 September 2021 5 | Milan | 2–0 | Venezia | Milan |
| 20:45 CEST (UTC+2) | Brahim 68'; Hernandez 82' | Report | Forte (yellow card) 25'; Caldara (yellow card) 77' | Stadium: San Siro; Attendance: 26,185; Referee: Ivano Pezzuto |

| 27 September 2021 6 | Venezia | 1–1 | Torino | Venice |
| 20:45 CEST (UTC+2) | Ampadu (yellow card) 59'; Aramu 79' (pen.) | Report | Pobega (yellow card) 43'; Brekalo 56'; Milinković-Savić (yellow card) 59'; Djidji (yellow card) 74' (yellow-red card) 78' | Stadium: Stadio Pier Luigi Penzo; Attendance: 4,888; Referee: Lorenzo Maggioni |

| 1 October 2021 7 | Cagliari | 1–1 | Venezia | Cagliari |
| 20:45 CEST (UTC+2) | Keita 19'; Nández (yellow card) 22'; Strootman (yellow card) 50' | Report | Ceccaroni (yellow card) 23'; Kiyine (yellow card) 30'; Ampadu (yellow card) 52'; Johnsen (yellow card) 68'; Aramu (yellow card) 70'; Busio 90+1' | Stadium: Sardegna Arena; Attendance: 8,135; Referee: Manuel Volpi |

| 18 October 2021 8 | Venezia | 1–0 | Fiorentina | Venice |
| 20:45 CEST (UTC+2) | Aramu 36'; Ceccaroni (yellow card) 63'; Ampadu (yellow card) 72' | Report | Amrabat (yellow card) 24'; Odriozola (yellow card) 28'; Benassi (yellow card) 61'; Sottil (yellow card) 69' (yellow-red card) 77' | Stadium: Stadio Pier Luigi Penzo; Attendance: 8,043; Referee: Luca Massimi |

| 23 October 2021 9 | Sassuolo | 3–1 | Venezia | Reggio Emilia |
| 18:00 CEST (UTC+2) | Berardi 37'; Henry 50' (o.g.); Frattesi 67'; Rogério (yellow card) 78' | Report | Črnigoj (yellow card) 9'; Okereke 32'; Henry (yellow card) 39' | Stadium: Mapei Stadium – Città del Tricolore; Attendance: 4,482; Referee: Antonio Di Martino |

| 26 October 2021 10 | Venezia | 1–2 | Salernitana | Venice |
| 18:30 CEST (UTC+2) | Busio (yellow card) 10'; Aramu 14'; Mazzocchi (yellow card) 59'; Ampadu (yellow card) 60', (red card) 67' | Report | Bonazzoli (yellow card) 45+1', (goal) 61'; Di Tacchio (yellow card) 80'; Zortea (yellow card) 90+3'; Schiavone 90+5' | Stadium: Stadio Pier Luigi Penzo; Attendance: 5,209; Referee: Marco Di Bello |

| 31 October 2021 11 | Genoa | 0–0 | Venezia | Genoa |
| 15:00 CET (UTC+1) | Biraschi (yellow card) 37' | Report | Mazzocchi (yellow card) 33'; Caldara (yellow card) 43'; Aramu (yellow card) 67' | Stadium: Stadio Luigi Ferraris; Attendance: 7,920; Referee: Maurizio Mariani |

| 7 November 2021 12 | Venezia | 3–2 | Roma | Venice |
| 12:30 CET (UTC+1) | Caldara 3'; Kiyine (yellow card) 47'; Aramu 65' (pen.); Okereke 74'; Romero (yellow card) 90+3' | Report | Karsdorp (yellow card) 16'; Shomurodov 43'; Abraham 45+2', (yellow card) 78' | Stadium: Stadio Pier Luigi Penzo; Attendance: 8,263; Referee: Gianluca Aureliano |

| 21 November 2021 13 | Bologna | 0–1 | Venezia | Bologna |
| 15:00 CET (UTC+1) | | Report | Busio (yellow card) 47'; Okereke 61'; Haps (yellow card) 73'; Romero (yellow card) 87' | Stadium: Stadio Renato Dall'Ara; Attendance: 15,255; Referee: Daniele Chiffi |

| 27 November 2021 14 | Venezia | 0–2 | Internazionale | Venice |
| 20:45 CET (UTC+1) | Aramu (yellow card) 54'; Haps (yellow card) 90+6' | Report | Çalhanoğlu 34'; Martínez 90+6' (pen.) | Stadium: Stadio Pier Luigi Penzo; Attendance: 8,303; Referee: Livio Marinelli |

| 30 November 2021 15 | Atalanta | 4–0 | Venezia | Bergamo |
| 18:30 CET (UTC+1) | Pašalić 7', 12', 67'; Koopmeiners 57' | Report | Ampadu (yellow card) 81' | Stadium: Gewiss Stadium; Attendance: 8,667; Referee: Alberto Santoro |

| 5 December 2021 16 | Venezia | 3–4 | Hellas Verona | Venice |
| 15:00 CET (UTC+1) | Ceccaroni 12', (red card) 63'; Črnigoj 19'; Henry 28', (yellow card) 90+5'; Vacca (yellow card) 73' | Report | Magnani (yellow card) 45'; Henry 52' (o.g.); Caprari 65' (pen.); Simeone 67', 85', (yellow card) 87' | Stadium: Stadio Pier Luigi Penzo; Attendance: 7,608; Referee: Alessandro Prontera |

| 11 December 2021 17 | Venezia | 1–1 | Juventus | Venice |
| 18:00 CET (UTC+1) | Modolo (yellow card) 41'; Caldara (yellow card) 51'; Aramu 55'; Ampadu (yellow card) 62'; Kiyine (yellow card) 90' | Report | Pellegrini (yellow card) 16'; Morata 32'; Bernardeschi (yellow card) 62' | Stadium: Stadio Pier Luigi Penzo; Attendance: 8,350; Referee: Paolo Valeri |

| 19 December 2021 18 | Sampdoria | 1–1 | Venezia | Genoa |
| 18:00 CET (UTC+1) | Gabbiadini 1'; Audero (yellow card) 81'; Silva (yellow card) 88' | Report | Forte (yellow card) 82'; Henry 87' | Stadium: Stadio Luigi Ferraris; Attendance: 5,735; Referee: Rosario Abisso |

| 22 December 2021 19 | Venezia | 1–3 | Lazio | Venice |
| 16:30 CET (UTC+1) | Forte 30'; Črnigoj (yellow card) 55'; Ampadu (yellow card) 74'; Caldara (yellow card) 86'; Tessmann (red card) 90+1' | Report | Pedro 3', (yellow card) 54'; Luiz Felipe (yellow card) 45'; Acerbi 48'; Bašić (yellow card) 64'; Luis Alberto 90+5' | Stadium: Stadio Pier Luigi Penzo; Attendance: 7,894; Referee: Fabio Maresca |

| 9 January 2022 21 | Venezia | 0–3 | Milan | Venice |
| 12:30 CET (UTC+1) | Ceccaroni (yellow card) 56'; Svoboda (red card) 58' | Report | Ibrahimović 2'; Saelemaekers (yellow card) 5'; Gabbia (yellow card) 37'; Hernandez 48', 59' (pen.); Tonali (yellow card) 73' | Stadium: Stadio Pier Luigi Penzo; Attendance: 5,582; Referee: Massimiliano Irrati |

| 16 January 2022 22 | Venezia | 1–1 | Empoli | Venice |
| 15:00 CET (UTC+1) | Cuisance (yellow card) 10'; Okereke (yellow card) 45+2', (goal) 73'; Črnigoj (yellow card) 58' | Report | Bajrami (yellow card) 9'; Żurkowski 26'; Henderson (yellow card) 45'; Ismajli (yellow card) 59'; Fiamozzi (yellow card) 63'; Bandinelli (yellow card) 76' | Stadium: Stadio Pier Luigi Penzo; Attendance: 3,805; Referee: Piero Giacomelli |

| 22 January 2022 23 | Internazionale | 2–1 | Venezia | Milan |
| 18:00 CET (UTC+1) | Barella (yellow card) 25', (goal) 40'; Bastoni (yellow card) 27'; De Vrij (yellow card) 80'; Džeko 90' | Report | Henry 19'; Lezzerini (yellow card) 40'; Modolo (yellow card) 45+2'; Kiyine (yellow card) 68'; Caldara (yellow card) 79' | Stadium: San Siro; Attendance: 5,000; Referee: Matteo Marchetti |

| 6 February 2022 24 | Venezia | 0–2 | Napoli | Venice |
| 15:00 CET (UTC+1) | Busio (yellow card) 76'; Ceccaroni (yellow card) 88'; Ebuehi (red card) 90+5' | Report | Osimhen 59'; Mário Rui (yellow card) 74'; Lobotka (yellow card) 83'; Petagna 90+10' | Stadium: Stadio Pier Luigi Penzo; Attendance: 5,554; Referee: Maurizio Mariani |

| 12 February 2022 25 | Torino | 1–2 | Venezia | Turin |
| 20:45 CET (UTC+1) | Brekalo 5'; Djidji (yellow card) 48'; Bremer (yellow card) 87' | Report | Busio (yellow card) 1'; Haps 38'; Črnigoj 46'; Caldara (yellow card) 82'; Ampadu (yellow card) 89'; Okereke (red card) 90+8' | Stadium: Stadio Olimpico Grande Torino; Attendance: 6,681; Referee: Antonio Giua |

| 20 February 2022 26 | Venezia | 1–1 | Genoa | Venice |
| 15:00 CET (UTC+1) | Henry 13'; Caldara (yellow card) 45+1'; Ampadu (yellow card) 89' | Report | Vásquez (yellow card) 23'; Ekuban 29'; Sturaro (yellow card) 48' | Stadium: Stadio Pier Luigi Penzo; Attendance: 7,566; Referee: Daniele Orsato |

| 27 February 2022 27 | Hellas Verona | 3–1 | Venezia | Verona |
| 15:05 CET (UTC+1) | Simeone 54', 63', 88' | Report | Caldara (yellow card) 56'; Okereke 81' | Stadium: Stadio Marcantonio Bentegodi; Attendance: 14,298; Referee: Juan Luca Sacchi |

| 6 March 2022 28 | Venezia | 1–4 | Sassuolo | Venice |
| 15:00 CET (UTC+1) | Aramu (yellow card) 17', (penalty missed) 85'; Fiordilino (yellow card) 19'; Henry 34'; Vacca (yellow card) 38'; Svoboda (yellow card) 50' | Report | Raspadori 2'; Berardi 17' (pen.), 71' (pen.); Scamacca 29' (pen.), (yellow card) 40' | Stadium: Stadio Pier Luigi Penzo; Attendance: 5,732; Referee: Luca Pairetto |

| 14 March 2022 29 | Lazio | 1–0 | Venezia | Rome |
| 20:45 CET (UTC+1) | Zaccagni (yellow card) 42'; Immobile 58' (pen.) | Report | Matějů (yellow card) 29' | Stadium: Stadio Olimpico; Attendance: 18,000; Referee: Gianluca Manganiello |

| 20 March 2022 30 | Venezia | 0–2 | Sampdoria | Venice |
| 12:30 CET (UTC+1) | Haps (yellow card) 35'; Henry (yellow card) 42' (yellow-red card) 86'; Okereke (yellow card) 44'; Busio (yellow card) 63' | Report | Caputo 24', 38'; Sabiri (yellow card) 35' | Stadium: Stadio Pier Luigi Penzo; Attendance: 7,591; Referee: Daniele Orsato |

| 2 April 2022 31 | Spezia | 1–0 | Venezia | La Spezia |
| 15:00 CEST (UTC+2) | Maggiore (yellow card) 79'; Manaj (yellow card) 85'; Gyasi 90+4', (yellow card) 90+6' | Report | Okereke (yellow card) 90+3' | Stadium: Stadio Alberto Picco; Attendance: 7,993; Referee: Daniele Doveri |

| 10 April 2022 32 | Venezia | 1–2 | Udinese | Venice |
| 15:00 CEST (UTC+2) | Busio (yellow card) 2'; Cuisance (yellow card) 18'; Haps (yellow card) 28'; Henry (yellow card) 59', (goal) 86'; Ceccaroni (yellow card) 61'; Ampadu (yellow card) 74'; Nani (yellow card) 77' | Report | Arslan (yellow card) 18'; Deulofeu 35' (pen.); Udogie (yellow card) 62'; Becão 90+4' | Stadium: Stadio Pier Luigi Penzo; Attendance: 10,459; Referee: Marco Guida |

| 16 April 2022 33 | Fiorentina | 1–0 | Venezia | Florence |
| 16:30 CEST (UTC+2) | Torreira 30', (yellow card) 90+3'; Sottil (yellow card) 79'; Duncan (yellow card) 83'; Venuti (yellow card) 90+5' | Report | Haps (yellow card) 29'; Okereke (yellow card) 36'; Kiyine (yellow card) 57'; Peretz (yellow card) 90' | Stadium: Stadio Artemio Franchi; Attendance: 31,627; Referee: Rosario Abisso |

| 23 April 2022 34 | Venezia | 1–3 | Atalanta | Venice |
| 15:00 CEST (UTC+2) | Črnigoj 80' | Report | Pašalić 44'; Zapata 47', (yellow card) 57'; Scalvini (yellow card) 49'; Muriel 63'; Djimsiti (yellow card) 71' | Stadium: Stadio Pier Luigi Penzo; Attendance: 6,132; Referee: Francesco Fourneau |

| 1 May 2022 35 | Juventus | 2–1 | Venezia | Turin |
| 12:30 CEST (UTC+2) | Bonucci 7', 76'; Zakaria (yellow card) 25'; Pellegrini (yellow card) 45+1'; Alex Sandro (yellow card) 63' | Report | Kiyine (yellow card) 56'; Aramu (yellow card) 61', (goal) 71'; Haps (yellow card) 78' | Stadium: Juventus Stadium; Attendance: 39,203; Referee: Alessandro Prontera |

| 5 May 2022 20 | Salernitana | 2–1 | Venezia | Salerno |
| 18:00 CEST (UTC+2) | Bonazzoli 7' (pen.); Éderson (yellow card) 54'; Verdi 67'; Bohinen (yellow card) 77' | Report | Ceccaroni (yellow card) 5'; Matějů (yellow card) 52'; Henry 58', (yellow card) 90+3'; Svoboda (yellow card) 61'; Busio (yellow card) 69'; Ampadu (yellow card) 89' (yellow-red card) 89' | Stadium: Stadio Arechi; Attendance: 22,200; Referee: Maurizio Mariani |
Note: The match was originally scheduled for 6 January 2022, but was postponed to 5 May 2022 due to COVID-19 outbreaks within the squads.

| 8 May 2022 36 | Venezia | 4–3 | Bologna | Venice |
| 15:00 CEST (UTC+2) | Henry 4'; Kiyine (penalty missed) 19', 19', (yellow card) 30'; Matějů (yellow card) 77'; Aramu 78' (pen.); Johnsen 90+3' | Report | Skorupski (yellow card) 16'; Hickey (yellow card) 38'; Orsolini 45+1'; Arnautović 55'; Schouten 68'; Medel (yellow card) 77'; Domínguez (yellow card) 80' | Stadium: Stadio Pier Luigi Penzo; Attendance: 6,674; Referee: Livio Marinelli |

| 14 May 2022 37 | Roma | 1–1 | Venezia | Rome |
| 20:45 CEST (UTC+2) | Spinazzola (yellow card) 39'; Pellegrini (yellow card) 68'; Shomurodov 76' | Report | Okereke 1', (yellow card) 61'; Kiyine (yellow card) 18', (red card) 32'; Vacca (yellow card) 26'; Ampadu (yellow card) 79'; Peretz (yellow card) 87' | Stadium: Stadio Olimpico; Attendance: 63,243; Referee: Simone Sozza |

| 22 May 2022 38 | Venezia | 0–0 | Cagliari | Venice |
| 21:00 CEST (UTC+2) | | Report | Ceppitelli (yellow card) 37'; Nández (yellow card) 59'; Altare (yellow card) 90+3' | Stadium: Stadio Pier Luigi Penzo; Attendance: 5,654; Referee: Fabio Maresca |

=== Coppa Italia ===
| 15 August 2021 First round | Venezia | 1–1 (a.e.t.) (8–7 p) | Frosinone | Ferrara |
| 20:45 CEST (UTC+2) | Fiordilino (yellow card) 67'; Di Mariano 101' (pen.) | Report | Rohdén (yellow card) 60'; Gori 93'; Brighenti (yellow card) 108' | Stadium: Stadio Paolo Mazza; Attendance: 250; Referee: Alessandro Prontrera |
| | Penalties |
| | Sigurðsson (penalty scored); Heymans (penalty scored); Di Mariano (penalty scored); Tessmann (penalty missed); Vacca (penalty scored); Ceccaroni (penalty scored); Johnses (penalty scored); Caldara (penalty scored); Ebuehi (penalty scored) | | (penalty scored) Ciano; (penalty missed) Maiello; (penalty scored) Zampano; (penalty scored) Iemmello; (penalty scored) Vitale; (penalty scored) Brighenti; (penalty scored) Szymiński; (penalty scored) Zerbin; (penalty missed) Gatti |

| 14 December 2021 Second round | Venezia | 3–1 | Ternana | Venice |
| 15:00 CET (UTC+1) | Schnegg (yellow card) 9'; Sigurðsson (yellow card) 23'; Heymans 49'; Črnigoj 66', (yellow card) 74'; De Vries (yellow card) 80'; Forte 81' | Report | Pettinari (yellow card) 40', (goal) 53' | Stadium: Stadio Pier Luigi Penzo; Attendance: 5,219; Referee: Daniele Minelli |

| 12 January 2022 Round of 16 | Atalanta | 2–0 | Venezia | Bergamo |
| 17:30 CET (UTC+1) | Muriel 12'; Koopmeiners (yellow card) 29'; Mæhle 88' | Report | Fiordilino (yellow card) 42'; Schnegg (yellow card) 54'; Ampadu (yellow card) 77'; Johnsen (yellow card) 90+3' | Stadium: Gewiss Stadium; Attendance: 2,757; Referee: Ivano Pezzuto |

== Statistics ==
=== Appearances and goals ===
| No. | Pos | Nat | Player | Total | | Serie A | | Coppa Italia | |
| No. | Pos | Nat | Player | Apps | Goals | Apps | Goals | Apps | Goals |
Goalkeepers
| 1 | GK | (Finland) FIN | Niki Mäenpää | 6 | 0 | 5+1 | 0 | 0 | 0 |
| 12 | GK | (Italy) ITA | Luca Lezzerini | 3 | 0 | 2 | 0 | 1 | 0 |
| 34 | GK | (Italy) ITA | Bruno Bertinato | 1 | 0 | 0 | 0 | 1 | 0 |
| 88 | GK | (Argentina) ARG | Sergio Romero | 11 | 0 | 11 | 0 | 0 | 0 |
Defenders
| 3 | DF | (Italy) ITA | Cristian Molinaro | 7 | 0 | 5+2 | 0 | 0 | 0 |
| 7 | DF | (Italy) ITA | Pasquale Mazzocchi | 16 | 0 | 12+3 | 0 | 1 | 0 |
| 13 | DF | (Italy) ITA | Marco Modolo | 4 | 0 | 1+2 | 0 | 1 | 0 |
| 22 | DF | (Nigeria) NGR | Tyronne Ebuehi | 11 | 0 | 6+4 | 0 | 1 | 0 |
| 28 | DF | (Austria) AUT | David Schnegg | 6 | 0 | 2+2 | 0 | 2 | 0 |
| 30 | DF | (Austria) AUT | Michael Svoboda | 11 | 0 | 5+4 | 0 | 1+1 | 0 |
| 31 | DF | (Italy) ITA | Mattia Caldara | 15 | 1 | 13+1 | 1 | 1 | 0 |
| 32 | DF | (Italy) ITA | Pietro Ceccaroni | 17 | 2 | 16 | 2 | 1 | 0 |
| 44 | DF | (Wales) WAL | Ethan Ampadu | 10 | 0 | 8+2 | 0 | 0 | 0 |
| 55 | DF | (Suriname) SUR | Ridgeciano Haps | 9 | 0 | 8+1 | 0 | 0 | 0 |
Midfielders
| 5 | MF | (Italy) ITA | Antonio Junior Vacca | 11 | 0 | 8+2 | 0 | 0+1 | 0 |
| 6 | MF | (Italy) ITA | Jacopo Dezi | 1 | 0 | 0+1 | 0 | 0 | 0 |
| 8 | MF | (United States) USA | Tanner Tessmann | 12 | 0 | 2+8 | 0 | 0+2 | 0 |
| 10 | MF | (Italy) ITA | Mattia Aramu | 15 | 5 | 11+3 | 5 | 1 | 0 |
| 11 | MF | (Iceland) ISL | Arnór Sigurdsson | 6 | 0 | 0+4 | 0 | 1+1 | 0 |
| 16 | MF | (Italy) ITA | Luca Fiordilino | 5 | 0 | 2+1 | 0 | 1+1 | 0 |
| 18 | MF | (Belgium) BEL | Daan Heymans | 9 | 1 | 2+5 | 0 | 2 | 1 |
| 23 | MF | (Morocco) MAR | Sofian Kiyine | 13 | 0 | 4+8 | 0 | 0+1 | 0 |
| 27 | MF | (United States) USA | Gianluca Busio | 16 | 1 | 15+1 | 1 | 0 | 0 |
| 33 | MF | (Slovenia) SLO | Domen Crnigoj | 17 | 2 | 9+6 | 1 | 1+1 | 1 |
| 38 | MF | (United States) USA | Jack de Vries | 1 | 0 | 0 | 0 | 0+1 | 0 |
| 42 | MF | (Israel) ISR | Dor Peretz | 11 | 0 | 2+7 | 0 | 2 | 0 |
Forwards
| 9 | FW | (Italy) ITA | Francesco Forte | 12 | 1 | 3+7 | 0 | 2 | 1 |
| 14 | FW | (France) FRA | Thomas Henry | 16 | 2 | 9+7 | 2 | 0 | 0 |
| 17 | FW | (Norway) NOR | Dennis Johnsen | 15 | 0 | 11+2 | 0 | 1+1 | 0 |
| 19 | MF | (Iceland) ISL | Bjarki Steinn Bjarkason | 1 | 0 | 0 | 0 | 1 | 0 |
| 77 | FW | (Nigeria) NGR | David Okereke | 14 | 4 | 11+3 | 4 | 0 | 0 |
Player transferred out during the season
| 20 | FW | (Italy) ITA | Francesco Di Mariano | 2 | 1 | 1 | 0 | 0+1 | 1 |
| - | FW | (Italy) ITA | Nicolas Galazzi | 1 | 0 | 0+1 | 0 | 0 | 0 |

Last updated: 14 December 2021
Source: Competitions
