= 2020–21 Venezia FC season =

Venezia F.C.
2020–21 season
- Chairman: Duncan L. Niederauer
- Head coach: Paolo Zanetti
- Stadium: Stadio Pier Luigi Penzo
- Serie B: 5th (promoted via play-offs)
- Coppa Italia: Third round
- Top goalscorer: League: Francesco Forte (14 goals); All: Francesco Forte (15 goals)
Home colours	Away colours
- All statistics correct as of 27 May 2021.

The 2020–21 season was the 114th season in the existence of Venezia F.C. and the club's fourth consecutive season in Serie B, the second division of Italian football. In addition to the domestic league, Venezia participated in this season's edition of the Coppa Italia.

== Players ==
=== First-team squad ===
As of 15 February 2021

Note: Flags indicate national team as defined under FIFA eligibility rules; some limited exceptions apply. Players may hold more than one non-FIFA nationality.

No.	Pos.	Nation	Player
1	GK	ITA	Riccardo Pigozzo
2	DF	ITA	Gabriele Ferrarini (on loan from Fiorentina)
3	DF	ITA	Cristian Molinaro
4	MF	FRA	Anthony Taugourdeau
5	MF	ITA	Antonio Junior Vacca
6	DF	ITA	Michele Cremonesi
7	MF	ITA	Pasquale Mazzocchi
8	MF	ITA	Jacopo Dezi
10	FW	ITA	Mattia Aramu
11	FW	ITA	Francesco Forte
12	GK	ITA	Luca Lezzerini
13	DF	ITA	Marco Modolo (Captain)
14	DF	ITA	Gian Filippo Felicioli
15	DF	ITA	Antonio Marino
16	MF	ITA	Luca Fiordilino
17	FW	NOR	Dennis Johnsen

No.	Pos.	Nation	Player
18	MF	ITA	Domenico Rossi
19	FW	ISL	Bjarki Steinn Bjarkason
20	FW	ITA	Francesco Di Mariano
21	MF	FIN	Lauri Ala-Myllymäki
22	GK	ITA	Alberto Pomini
23	FW	SCO	Harvey St Clair
24	FW	ITA	Riccardo Bocalon
28	FW	ISL	Óttar Magnús Karlsson
29	MF	ITA	Youssef Maleh (on loan from Fiorentina)
30	DF	AUT	Michael Svoboda
31	DF	ITA	Giacomo Ricci (on loan from Parma)
32	DF	ITA	Pietro Ceccaroni
33	MF	SLO	Domen Črnigoj
70	FW	ITA	Sebastiano Esposito (on loan from Inter)
—	GK	FIN	Niki Mäenpää

=== Out on loan ===
Note: Flags indicate national team as defined under FIFA eligibility rules; some limited exceptions apply. Players may hold more than one non-FIFA nationality.

No.	Pos.	Nation	Player
—	GK	BRA	Bruno Bertinato (at Vis Pesaro)
—	DF	ITA	Emanuele Cigagna (at Paganese)
—	DF	ITA	Mario De Marino (at Bisceglie)
—	MF	ITA	Filippo Serena (at Gubbio)

No.	Pos.	Nation	Player
—	FW	ITA	Nicolas Galazzi (at Piacenza)
—	FW	ITA	Yuri Senesi (at Cavese)
—	FW	ITA	Nicolò Simeoni (at Grosseto)
—	FW	ITA	Gianmarco Zigoni (at Mantova)

== Pre-season and friendlies ==
Win Draw Loss

13 September 2020 Friendly	Udinese (Italy)	0–1	(Italy) Venezia	Manzano, Italy
19:00 CEST (UTC+2)				Stadium: Stadio Comunale Giuseppe Morigi; Attendance: 0

== Competitions ==
=== Overall record ===
Competition	First match	Last match	Starting round	Final position	Record							
Competition	First match	Last match	Starting round	Final position	Pld	W	D	L	GF	GA	GD	Win %
Serie A	26 September 2020	10 May 2021	Matchday 1	5th	38	15	14	9	53	39	+14	39.47
Serie B promotion play-offs	13 May 2021	27 May 2021	Preliminary round	Winners	5	3	2	0	7	4	+3	60.00
Coppa Italia	30 September 2020	28 October 2020	Second round	Third round	2	1	1	0	5	3	+2	50.00
Total					45	19	17	9	65	46	+19	42.22

Source: Soccerway

=== Serie B ===
==== League table ====
Pos	Team	Pld	W	D	L	GF	GA	GD	Pts	Promotion, qualification or relegation
3	Monza	38	17	13	8	51	33	+18	64	Qualification for promotion play-offs semi-finals
4	Lecce	38	16	14	8	68	47	+21	62	Qualification for promotion play-offs semi-finals
5	Venezia (O, P)	38	15	14	9	53	39	+14	59	Qualification for promotion play-offs preliminary round
6	Cittadella	38	15	12	11	48	35	+13	57	Qualification for promotion play-offs preliminary round
7	Brescia	38	15	11	12	61	53	+8	56 (Note: Head-to-head points: Brescia 9, Chievo 5, SPAL 2.)	Qualification for promotion play-offs preliminary round

Source: Lega Serie B (in Italian), Soccerway (in English)
Rules for classification: 1) Points; 2) Head-to-head points; 3) Head-to-head goal difference; 4) Goal difference; 5) Goals scored; 6) Draw.
(O) Play-off winners; (P) Promoted

==== Results summary ====
Overall								Home						Away					
Pld	W	D	L	GF	GA	GD	Pts	W	D	L	GF	GA	GD	W	D	L	GF	GA	GD
38	15	14	9	53	39	+14	59	10	3	6	28	19	+9	5	11	3	25	20	+5

Source: Serie B

==== Results by round ====
Round	1	2	3	4	5	6	7	8	9	10	11	12	13	14	15	16	17	18	19	20	21	22	23	24	25	26	27	28	29	30	31	32	33	34	35	36	37	38
Ground	H	H	A	H	A	H	A	A	H	A	H	A	H	A	H	A	H	A	H	A	A	H	A	H	A	H	H	A	H	A	H	A	H	A	H	A	H	A
Result	W	L	D	W	W	W	L	D	W	D	L	W	D	D	L	D	D	L	W	D	W	W	W	W	D	W	L	D	L	W	L	D	W	L	W	D	D	D
Position	3	8	10	4	6	6	3	5	5	6	6	6	6	7	8	8	7	10	9	9	9	7	6	4	4	2	4	5	5	5	5	5	4	5	5	5	5	5

Source: Serie B
A = Away; H = Home; W = Win; D = Draw; L = Loss

==== Matches ====
The league fixtures were announced on 9 September 2020.

26 September 2020 1	Venezia	1–0	Vicenza	Venice
CEST (UTC+2)				Stadium: Stadio Pier Luigi Penzo

3 October 2020 2	Venezia	0–2	Frosinone	Venice
CEST (UTC+2)				Stadium: Stadio Pier Luigi Penzo

17 October 2020 3	Cremonese	0–0	Venezia	Cremona
CEST (UTC+2)				Stadium: Stadio Giovanni Zini

20 October 2020 4	Venezia	4–0	Pescara	Venice
CEST (UTC+2)				Stadium: Stadio Pier Luigi Penzo

14 November 2020 5	Virtus Entella	0–2	Venezia	Chiavari
CET (UTC+1)				Stadium: Comunale Aldo Gastaldi

1 November 2020 6	Venezia	2–0	Empoli	Venice
CET (UTC+1)				Stadium: Stadio Pier Luigi Penzo

8 November 2020 7	Reggiana	2–1	Venezia	Reggio Emilia
CET (UTC+1)				Stadium: Mapei Stadium – Città del Tricolore

21 November 2020 8	Brescia	2–2	Venezia	Brescia
CET (UTC+1)				Stadium: Stadio Mario Rigamonti

28 November 2020 9	Venezia	2–1	Ascoli	Venice
CET (UTC+1)				Stadium: Stadio Pier Luigi Penzo

5 December 2020 10	Lecce	2–2	Venezia	Lecce
CET (UTC+1)				Stadium: Stadio Via del Mare

11 December 2020 11	Venezia	0–2	Monza	Venice
CET (UTC+1)				Stadium: Stadio Pier Luigi Penzo

14 December 2020 12	Reggina	1–2	Venezia	Reggio Calabria
CET (UTC+1)				Stadium: Stadio Oreste Granillo

19 December 2020 13	Venezia	0–0	SPAL	Venice
CET (UTC+1)				Stadium: Stadio Pier Luigi Penzo

22 December 2020 14	Cosenza	0–0	Venezia	Cosenza
CET (UTC+1)				Stadium: Stadio San Vito-Gigi Marulla

27 December 2020 15	Venezia	1–2	Salernitana	Venice
CET (UTC+1)				Stadium: Stadio Pier Luigi Penzo

30 December 2020 16	Chievo	1–1	Venezia	Verona
CET (UTC+1)				Stadium: Stadio Marcantonio Bentegodi

4 January 2021 17	Venezia	1–1	Pisa	Venice
CET (UTC+1)				Stadium: Stadio Pier Luigi Penzo

16 January 2021 18	Pordenone	2–0	Venezia	Pordenone
CET (UTC+1)				Stadium: Stadio Guido Teghil

23 January 2021 19	Venezia	1–0	Cittadella	Venice
CET (UTC+1)				Stadium: Stadio Pier Luigi Penzo

29 January 2021 20	Vicenza	0–0	Venezia	Vicenza
CET (UTC+1)				Stadium: Stadio Romeo Menti

6 February 2021 21	Frosinone	1–2	Venezia	Frosinone
CET (UTC+1)				Stadium: Stadio Benito Stirpe

9 February 2021 22	Venezia	3–1	Cremonese	Venice
CET (UTC+1)				Stadium: Stadio Pier Luigi Penzo

13 February 2021 23	Pescara	0–2	Venezia	Pescara
CET (UTC+1)

20 February 2021 24	Venezia	3–2	Virtus Entella	Venice
CET (UTC+1)				Stadium: Stadio Pier Luigi Penzo

26 February 2021 25	Empoli	1–1	Venezia	Empoli
CET (UTC+1)

1 March 2021 26	Venezia	2–1	Reggiana	Venice
CET (UTC+1)				Stadium: Stadio Pier Luigi Penzo

6 March 2021 27	Venezia	0–1	Brescia	Venice
CET (UTC+1)				Stadium: Stadio Pier Luigi Penzo

13 March 2021 28	Ascoli	1–1	Venezia	Ascoli Piceno
CET (UTC+1)

16 March 2021 29	Venezia	2–3	Lecce	Venice
CET (UTC+1)				Stadium: Stadio Pier Luigi Penzo

20 March 2021 30	Monza	1–4	Venezia	Monza
CET (UTC+1)				Stadium: Stadio Brianteo

2 April 2021 31	Venezia	0–2	Reggina	Venice
CEST (UTC+2)				Stadium: Stadio Pier Luigi Penzo

5 April 2021 32	SPAL	1–1	Venezia	Ferrara
CEST (UTC+2)				Stadium: Stadio Paolo Mazza

11 April 2021 33	Venezia	3–0	Cosenza	Venice
CEST (UTC+2)				Stadium: Stadio Pier Luigi Penzo

17 April 2021 34	Salernitana	2–1	Venezia	Salerno
CEST (UTC+2)

1 May 2021 35	Venezia	3–1	Chievo	Venice
CEST (UTC+2)				Stadium: Stadio Pier Luigi Penzo

4 May 2021 36	Pisa	2–2	Venezia	Pisa
CEST (UTC+2)

7 May 2021 37	Venezia	0–0	Pordenone	Venice
CEST (UTC+2)				Stadium: Stadio Pier Luigi Penzo

10 May 2021 38	Cittadella	1–1	Venezia	Cittadella
CEST (UTC+2)				Stadium: Stadio Pier Cesare Tombolato

==== Promotion play-offs ====
13 May 2021 Preliminary round	Venezia	3–2 (a.e.t.)	Chievo	Venice
21:00 CEST (UTC+2)	Bertagnoli 60' (o.g.); Maleh 107'; Johnsen 116'	Report	Garritano 10' (pen.); Mogoș 104' (pen.)	Stadium: Stadio Pier Luigi Penzo; Attendance: 0 Referee: Simone Sozza

17 May 2021 Semi-finals; First leg	Venezia	1–0	Lecce	Venice
20:45 CEST (UTC+2)	Forte 47'	Report		Stadium: Stadio Pier Luigi Penzo; Attendance: 0 Referee: Valerio Marini

20 May 2021 Semi-finals; Second leg	Lecce	1–1 (1–2 agg.)	Venezia	Lecce
18:30 CEST (UTC+2)	Pettinari 65'; Mancosu (penalty missed) 80'; Rodríguez (red card) 90+6'	Report	Aramu 45+3' (pen.)	Stadium: Stadio Via del Mare; Attendance: 0 Referee: Massimiliano Irrati

23 May 2021 Finals; First leg	Cittadella	0–1	Venezia	Cittadella
21:15 CEST (UTC+2)			Di Mariano 50'	Stadium: Pier Cesare Tombolato

27 May 2021 Finals; Second leg	Venezia	1–1 (2–1 agg.)	Cittadella	Venice
21:30 CEST (UTC+2)	Bocalon 90+3'		Proia 26'	Stadium: Stadio Pier Luigi Penzo

=== Coppa Italia ===
30 September 2020 Second round	Venezia	2–0	Carrarese	Venice
18:00 CEST (UTC+2)	Johnsen 65', 90'	Report		Stadium: Stadio Pier Luigi Penzo; Attendance: 0 Referee: Riccardo Ros

28 October 2020 Third round	Hellas Verona	3–3 (a.e.t.) (3–1 p)	Venezia	Verona
17:00 CEST (UTC+2)	Ilić 41'; Salcedo 59'; Rüegg (yellow card) 69'; Empereur (yellow card) 72'; Vieira 110'	Report	Rossi (yellow card) 48'; Cremonesi (yellow card) 49'; Johnsen 84'; Capello 87'; Modulo 98'	Stadium: Stadio Marcantonio Bentegodi; Referee: Giacomo Camplone
	Penalties
	Lazović (penalty scored); Barák (penalty scored); Colley (penalty scored)		(penalty missed) Modolo; (penalty missed) Johnsen; (penalty scored) Fiordilino; (penalty missed) Capello
