= Francesco Forte (footballer, born 1993) =

Italian footballer

Personal information
- Date of birth: 1 May 1993 (age 33)
- Place of birth: Rome, Italy
- Height: 1.90 m (6 ft 3 in)
- Position: Forward

Team information
- Current team: Virtus Entella

Youth career
- G.S.D. Nuova Tor Tre Teste
- 2010–2011: Pisa
- 2011–2012: Inter Milan

Senior career*
Years	Team	Apps	(Gls)
2010–2011	Pisa	1	(0)
2011–2018	Inter Milan	1	(0)
2013–2014	→ Pisa (loan)	24	(3)
2014–2015	→ Forlì (loan)	16	(2)
2015	→ Lucchese (loan)	18	(10)
2015–2016	→ Cremonese (loan)	14	(3)
2016	→ Teramo (loan)	14	(1)
2016–2017	→ Lucchese (loan)	21	(15)
2017	→ Perugia (loan)	11	(3)
2017–2018	→ Spezia (loan)	31	(6)
2018–2020	Waasland-Beveren	35	(9)
2019–2020	→ Juve Stabia (loan)	32	(17)
2020–2022	Venezia	50	(16)
2022	→ Benevento (loan)	19	(7)
2022–2023	Benevento	20	(3)
2023	→ Ascoli (loan)	14	(3)
2023–2026	Ascoli	11	(3)
2023–2024	→ Cosenza (loan)	31	(5)
2025–2026	→ Catania (loan)	29	(8)
2026–	Virtus Entella	0	(0)

International career^{‡}
2013	Italy U20	1	(0)
2013–2015	Italy U21 "C"	5	(2)
- * Club domestic league appearances and goals as of 1 May 2026 ‡ National team caps and goals as of 13 July 2023

Francesco Forte (born 1 May 1993) is an Italian professional footballer who plays as a forward for Serie B club Virtus Entella.

== Club career ==
=== Pisa ===
Forte made his professional debut for Pisa on 12 September 2010, against Ternana. He was a substitute of Giovanni Scampini.

=== Internazionale ===
Forte was signed by Internazionale on 2 August 2011 in a temporary deal, with Luca Tremolada moved to opposite direction. In June 2012 Inter signed Forte in a co-ownership deal for €170,000. Forte remained for the reserve team in 2012–13 season, as an overage player. Forte also made his Serie A debut in a 1–0 loss against Palermo coming as an 87th-minute substitute for Zdravko Kuzmanović, in 2012–13 Serie A. In June 2013 the co-ownership was renewed.

==== Loan to Pisa ====
On 1 July 2013, Forte was signed by Serie C side Pisa with a season-long loan deal. On 15 September he made his debut for Pisa, in Serie C, as a substitute replacing Giuseppe Giovinco in the 88th minute in a 1–0 away win over L'Aquila. On 20 October, Forte scored his first professional goal in the 33rd minute of a 3–0 home win over Paganese. On 24 November he scored his second goal, as a substitute, in the 86th minute of a 1–1 away draw against Prato. On 16 March 2014, Forte played his first entire match for Pisa and he scored his third goal in the 34th minute of a 2–2 home draw against Benevento. Forte ended his season-long loan to Pisa with 24 appearances and 3 goals.

==== Loan to Forlì and Lucchese ====
In June 2014 co-ownership was renewed again. On 15 July 2014 he was signed by Serie C side Forlì on a season-long loan deal. On 1 September he made his debut, in Serie C, in a 1–0 home win over Reggiana, he played the entire match. On 21 September, Forte score his first goal for Forlì, as a substitute, in the 89th minute of a 2–2 home draw against Carrarese. On 6 December he scored his second goal in the 21st minute of a 2–2 home draw against L'Aquila. In January 2015, Forte was re-called to Inter leaving Forlì with 16 appearances, 2 goals and 2 assists.

On 5 January 2015, Forte was signed by Lucchese with a 6-month loan deal. On 6 January, Forte made his debut, in Serie C, as a substitute replacing Riccardo Calcagni in the 61st minute and he scored his first goal after 6 minute in a 3–2 home win over Pro Piacenza. On 10 January, Forte played his first match for Lucchese as a starter, a 0–0 away draw against Santarcangelo, he was replaced by Filip Raicevic in the 76th minute. On 17 January he played his first entire match for Lucchese and he scored his second goal in the 44th minute of a 1–1 home draw against Gubbio. On 24 January, Forte scored his third goal in the 13th minute of a 3–0 away win over Savona. On 28 February he made his first career hat-trick in a 3–1 home win over L'Aquila. On 2 May in a match against Reggiana, Forte was sent off with a double yellow card in the 85th minute. Forte ended his 6-month loan to Lucchese with 18 appearances, 10 goals and 2 assists. Inter finally acquired Forte outright in June 2015.

==== Loan to Cremonese and Teramo ====
On 15 July 2015, as part of the deal of Rey Manaj, Forte and Fabio Eguelfi moved to Cremonese on a 6-month loan deal. On 2 August, Forte made his debut for Cremonese in the first round of Coppa Italia in a match lost 4–3 at penalties after a 0–0 away draw against Brescia, he was replaced by Simone Magnaghi in the 82nd minute. On 6 September, Forte made his Serie C debut for Cremonese in a 1–1 away draw against Bassano Virtus, he played the entire match. On 27 September he score his first goal for Cremonese, as a substitute, in the 90th minute of a 3–3 home draw against Mantova. On 10 October, Forte score his second goal, again as a substitute, in the 75th minute of a 1–1 away draw against Pordenone. On 15 November he score his third goal in the 19th minute of a 1–1 home draw against Padova. Forte ended his loan to Cremonese with 15 appearances and 3 goals.

On 12 January 2016, he was signed by Serie C side Teramo on a 6-month loan deal. On 14 January, Forte made his debut for Teramo in Serie C in a 1–0 win over Ancona, he played the entire match. On 14 February he scored his first goal for Teramo in the 59th minute in a 2–0 home win against Tuttocuoio. Forte concluded his loan to Teramo with 14 appearances, 1 goal and 1 assist.

==== Loan to Lucchese and Perugia ====
On 22 July 2016, Forte was signed by Lucchese with a season-long loan deal. On 28 August, Forte made his debut for Lucchese in Serie C in a 1–1 home draw against Piacenza, he played the entire match. On 4 September he scored 2 goals in a 2–2 away draw against Olbia. On 2 October, Forte score again 2 goals in a 4–2 away win over Pontedera. On 23 October, Forte score for the third time with Lucchese 2 goals in a match, in a 3–0 win over Prato. The first part of the season is very positive thus attracting the attention of clubs in Serie B. At the end of December he was recall to the first team, and he concluded his loan to Lucchese with 21 appearances and 15 goals.

On 21 January 2017, Forte was signed by Serie B side Perugia on a 6-month loan. On 23 January, Forte made his Serie B debut for Perugia in a 3–3 home draw against Cesena, in this match he scored the final goal in the 75th minute, he was replaced in the 80th minute by Cristian Buonaiuto. On 28 January he played his first entire match for Perugia, a 0–0 away draw against Bari. On 4 February, Forte scored twice in a 3–2 home win over Brescia. Forte ended his loan to Perugia with 11 appearances and 3 goals.

==== Loan to Spezia ====
On 12 July 2017, Forte and Raffaele Di Gennaro moved to Spezia on a season-long loan deal. On 5 August, Forte made his debut for Spezia in the second round of Coppa Italia. On 12 August he play in the third round as a substitute replacing Pietro Ceccaroni in the 50th minute in a 2–0 away defeat against Sassuolo. On 26 August, Forte made his Serie B debut for Spezia in a 2–0 away defeat against Palermo, he was replaced by Antonio Piccolo in the 57th minute. On 21 October he score his first goal for Spezia, as a substitute, in the 77th minute of a 4–2 win over Perugia. On 5 November he played his first entire match for Spezia, a 1–1 away draw against Empoli. On 25 November, Forte scored his second goal in the 83rd minute of a 4–0 home win over Pescara. On 16 December he scored his third goal, as a substitute, in the 74th minute of a 2–0 away win over Pro Vercelli. Forte ended his loan to Spezia with 33 appearances and 6 goals.

=== Waasland-Beveren ===
On 26 July 2018, Forte signed a 3-year deal with Waasland-Beveren. Two days later, on 28 July, he made his First Division A debut for Waasland-Beveren as a substitute replacing Cherif Ndiaye in the 46th minute of a 2–2 away draw against Zulte-Waregem. On 25 September he played his first match in the Belgian Cup, a 2–1 home defeat against Mandel United. On 3 October he played his first match as a starter for Waasland-Beveren, a 0–0 home draw against Standard Liège, he was replaced by Lamine N'Dao after 62 minutes.

==== Loan to Juve Stabia ====
On 2 September 2019, he joined Serie B club Juve Stabia on loan with an option to buy.

=== Venezia ===
On 23 September 2020, he signed a three-year contract with Venezia.

=== Benevento ===
On 14 January 2022, he joined Benevento in Serie B on loan with an obligation to buy.

=== Ascoli ===
On 24 January 2023, Forte joined Ascoli on loan until the end of the season with an obligation to buy.

==== Loan to Cosenza ====
On 1 September 2023, Forte moved on loan to Cosenza with an option to buy.

==== Betting ban ====
On 29 July 2024, he was banned from playing for 9 months and fined €6,000 for betting.

=== Virtus Entella ===
On 2 July 2026, Forte signed with Virtus Entella in Serie B.

== Career statistics ==
=== Club ===
As of match played 22 August 2023

Appearances and goals by club, season and competition
Club	Season	League			Cup (Note: Includes Coppa Italia, Coppa Italia Serie C)		Europe		Other		Total	
Club	Season	League	Apps	Goals	Apps	Goals	Apps	Goals	Apps	Goals	Apps	Goals
Pisa	2010–11	Lega Pro 1	1	0	0	0	—		—		1	0
Inter	2012–13	Serie A	1	0	1	0	0	0	—		2	0
Pisa	2013–14	Lega Pro 1	22	3	2	1	—		1 (Note: Appearance(s) in Lega Pro/Serie C play-off)	0	25	4
Forlì (loan)	2014–15	Lega Pro	16	2	2	1	—		—		18	3
Lucchese (loan)	2014–15	Lega Pro	18	10	0	0	—		—		18	10
Cremonese (loan)	2015–16	Lega Pro	14	3	2	0	—		—		16	3
Teramo (loan)	2015–16	Lega Pro	14	1	0	0	—		—		14	1
Lucchese (loan)	2016–17	Lega Pro	21	15	2	1	—		—		23	16
Perugia (loan)	2016–17	Serie B	11	3	0	0	—		—		11	3
Spezia (loan)	2017–18	Serie B	31	6	2	0	—		—		33	6
Waasland-Beveren	2018–19	Belgian Pro League	31	8	1	0	—		—		32	8
Waasland-Beveren	2019–20	Belgian Pro League	4	1	0	0	—		—		4	1
Waasland-Beveren	Total		35	9	1	0	0	0	0	0	36	9
Juve Stabia (loan)	2019–20	Serie B	32	17	0	0	—		—		32	17
Venezia	2020–21	Serie B	33	14	2	0	—		5 (Note: Appearance(s) in Serie B play-off)	1	40	15
Venezia	2021–22	Serie A	12	1	2	1	—		—		14	2
Venezia	Total		45	15	4	1	—		5	1	54	17
Benevento	2021–22	Serie B	18	7	0	0	—		1	0	19	7
Benevento	2022–23	Serie B	20	3	1	0	—		—		21	3
Benevento	Total		38	10	1	0	—		1	0	40	10
Ascoli	2022–23	Serie B	14	3	0	0	—		—		14	3
Ascoli	2023–24	Serie B	1	0	1	1	—		—		2	1
Ascoli	Total		15	3	1	1	—		—		16	4
Career total			314	97	18	5	0	0	7	1	339	103

== Honours ==
=== Club ===
Inter Primavera

- Campionato Nazionale Primavera: 2011–12
