= Jack de Vries (soccer) =

American soccer player

Personal information
- Date of birth: March 28, 2002 (age 24)
- Place of birth: Dayton, Ohio, United States
- Height: 5 ft 10 in (1.78 m)
- Position: Midfielder

Team information
- Current team: Den Bosch
- Number: 15

Youth career
- 2012–2015: Anderlecht
- 2015–2020: Philadelphia Union
- 2021–2022: → Venezia (loan)

Senior career*
Years	Team	Apps	(Gls)
2019–2020	Philadelphia Union II	6	(0)
2020–2022	Philadelphia Union	4	(0)
2021–2022	→ Venezia (loan)	0	(0)
2022–2025	Venezia	3	(0)
2023	→ KTP (loan)	13	(1)
2023–2024	→ Vis Pesaro (loan)	18	(0)
2025–	Den Bosch	17	(2)

International career
2019	United States U17	4	(0)
- * Club domestic league appearances and goals as of April 25, 2026

Jack de Vries (born March 28, 2002) is an American professional soccer player who plays as a midfielder for Eerste Divisie club Den Bosch.

== Club career ==
Born in Dayton, Ohio, de Vries is the son of the Dutch former professional soccer player Raimo de Vries. De Vries then moved with his family unit to Brussels in Belgium. While living in Belgium, de Vries was part of the youth academy at Anderlecht for three seasons before moving with his family back to the United States in Virginia Beach, Virginia.

In 2015, de Vries moved again to Philadelphia, Pennsylvania, where he joined the YSC Academy, the youth development system of Major League Soccer club Philadelphia Union. In December 2018, de Vries committed to playing college soccer for the Virginia Cavaliers at the University of Virginia. Prior to the 2019 season, de Vries joined USL Championship side Bethlehem Steel, the reserve affiliate for the Union. He joined the club on a USL academy contract, allowing him to retain his college soccer eligibility.

On March 10, 2019, de Vries made his professional debut for Bethlehem Steel in their opening match against Birmingham Legion. He came on as a late game substitute for Zach Zandi, as the Steel won 2–0.

=== Philadelphia Union ===
On August 20, 2019, de Vries agreed to join the Philadelphia Union, signing a professional pre-contract for the 2020 season. Prior to signing with the Union, de Vries also had offers to join Dutch club PSV Eindhoven and Danish side Copenhagen. Upon signing, Union sporting director Ernst Tanner praised de Vries, stating "He is an exciting attacking prospect. He is a very versatile player, capable of playing as an attacking midfielder or as a forward. He is ready for the leap to the professional game and we are pleased to have him officially join our first team next season."

On July 9, 2020, de Vries made his senior debut for the Philadelphia Union against New York City FC during the MLS is Back Tournament. He came on as a late substitute for Alejandro Bedoya. Prior to the 2021 season, in late March, de Vries was added into concussion protocol.

=== Venezia ===
On August 31, 2021, de Vries joined Serie A club Venezia on loan for the 2021–22 season, spending much of his time with the under-19 team.

On December 14, 2021, he made his first team debut for the Italian side, coming in as a substitute for Arnór Sigurðsson at the 80th minute of the Coppa Italia game against Ternana, which was eventually won 3–1 by Venezia.

On July 7, 2022, de Vries officially returned to Venezia, joining the club on a permanent deal for a reported $1 million transfer fee.

==== Loans in Finland and Italy ====
On February 12, 2023, de Vries was loaned to Finnish side KTP, along with teammates Damiano Pecile and Gabriel Sandberg. The loan deal expired in June of the same year.

On September 1, 2023, de Vries joined Serie C club Vis Pesaro on a season-long loan.

=== Den Bosch ===
On August 2, 2025, de Vries signed a two-season contract with Den Bosch in the Netherlands.

== International career ==
On April 22, 2019, de Vries was selected into the United States under-17 squad for the CONCACAF U-17 Championship. He made his international debut in their opening match against Canada. He made one more appearance, as a starter against Barbados, as the United States finished as runners-up and qualified for the FIFA U-17 World Cup.

== Career statistics ==
As of 11 June 2024

Appearances and goals by club, season and competition
Club	Season	League			National cup		Continental		Other		Total	
Club	Season	Division	Apps	Goals	Apps	Goals	Apps	Goals	Apps	Goals	Apps	Goals
Philadelphia Union II	2019	USL Championship	3	0	—		—		—		3	0
Philadelphia Union II	2020	USL Championship	3	0	—		—		—		3	0
Philadelphia Union II	Total		6	0	—		—		—		6	0
Philadelphia Union	2020	MLS	4	0	—		—		—		4	0
Venezia (loan)	2021–22	Serie A	0	0	1	0	—		—		1	0
Venezia	2022–23	Serie B	3	0	—		—		—		3	0
KTP (loan)	2023	Veikkausliiga	13	1	3	2	–		4 (Note: Includes Finnish League Cup)	1	20	4
Vis Pesaro (loan)	2023–24	Serie C	18	0	–		–		1 (Note: Includes Coppa Italia Serie C)	0	19	0
Career total			44	1	4	2	0	0	5	1	53	4

== Honors ==
Philadelphia Union

- Supporters Shield: 2020
