= Bruno Bertinato =

Brazilian footballer (born 1998)

Personal information
- Full name: Bruno Oliveira Bertinato
- Date of birth: 31 May 1998 (age 28)
- Place of birth: Curitiba, Brazil
- Height: 1.95 m (6 ft 5 in)
- Position: Goalkeeper

Team information
- Current team: Palmeiras
- Number: 21

Youth career
- 2009–2019: Coritiba

Senior career*
| Years | Team | Apps | (Gls) |
| 2019–2024 | Venezia | 12 | (0) |
| 2020–2021 | → Lecco (loan) | 9 | (0) |
| 2021 | → Vis Pesaro (loan) | 11 | (0) |
| 2025–2026 | Portuguesa | 39 | (0) |
| 2025 | → Mirassol (loan) | 0 | (0) |
| 2026– | Palmeiras | 0 | (0) |

International career
| 2013 | Brazil U16 | 1 | (0) |
| 2014–2015 | Brazil U17 | 3 | (0) |
Medal record
Representing Brazil
| Winner | South American U-17 Championship | 2015 |
- * Club domestic league appearances and goals as of 14:27, 3 August 2026 (UTC)

Bruno Oliveira Bertinato (born 31 May 1998), sometimes known as just Bruno, is a Brazilian footballer who plays as a goalkeeper for Palmeiras.

== Early life ==
Born in Curitiba, Paraná also in possession of an Italian passport, Bertinato grew up playing in the Coritiba Foot Ball Club youth teams having been spotted at the age of 11, at a summer camp held at Couto Pereira. As well as playing for Coritiba he received several call-ups by Brazil national age-group teams.

== Club career ==
=== Venezia ===
Bertinato signed a three-year contract with Italian Serie B side Venezia on 31 January 2019, with his former side Coritiba retaining 20% of his economic rights. He was initially a fourth-choice behind Guglielmo Vicario, Luca Lezzerini and Davide Facchin, before becoming a third-choice behind Lezzerini and new signing Alberto Pomini during the 2019–20 season after both Vicario and Facchin left.

==== Loans to Serie C ====
On 9 September 2020, Bertinato joined Serie C side Lecco on loan. After playing nine matches for Lecco, he was announced as a new signing for fellow league team Vis Pesaro also in a temporary deal on 1 February 2021.

==== Breakthrough ====
Bertinato returned to Venezia for the 2021–22 season, and made his debut for the club on 15 August of that year, in a 1–1 Coppa Italia home draw (8–7 penalty win) against Frosinone. However, he spent the entire Serie A season as a third-choice behind Niki Mäenpää and Sergio Romero.

On 25 June 2022, Bertinato signed a new one-year contract with Venezia with the option of a further year. He first appeared in the Serie B on 29 October, replacing field player Michael Svoboda in a 2–0 home loss to Ascoli as Jesse Joronen was sent off.

Bertinato made his first league start for Venezia on 3 December 2022, in a 2–1 home win over Ternana where he was given the man-of-the-match award. On 14 September of the following year, he further extended his link until 2025, with an option for another two years.

=== Portuguesa ===
On 19 December 2024, Bertinato returned to his home country after nearly six years, signing for Portuguesa. Initially a backup to Rafael Santos in the 2025 Campeonato Paulista, he was a first-choice in the 2025 Série D.

On 20 August 2025, Bertinato was loaned out to Série A side Mirassol until December. He returned to his parent club on 22 November, after failing to appear in a single matchday squad.

An undisputed first-choice upon returning, Bertinato agreed to leave Lusa in August 2026, after 27 appearances in the season.

=== Palmeiras ===
On 25 August 2026, Bertinato was announced at Palmeiras in the top tier, on a contract until the end of the year.

== Personal life ==
Bertinato has spoken of his admiration for the Brazil and Liverpool goalkeeper Alisson Becker. Bruno's agent is the brother of former Liverpool and Brazil goalkeeper Doni. Bruno has been very good friends with Matheus Cunha since they lived together as youngsters at Coritiba.

In June 2024, Bertinato married Maria Laura Fogaça, an entrepreneur in Brazil.

== Career statistics ==
As of 3 August 2026

| Club | Season | League | | | State League | | Cup | | Conmebol | | Other | | Total | |
| Club | Season | Division | Apps | Goals | Apps | Goals | Apps | Goals | Apps | Goals | Apps | Goals | Apps | Goals |
|---|---|---|---|---|---|---|---|---|---|---|---|---|---|---|
| Venezia | 2018–19 | Serie B | 0 | 0 | — | | 0 | 0 | — | | — | | 0 | 0 |
| Venezia | 2019–20 | Serie B | 0 | 0 | — | | 0 | 0 | — | | — | | 0 | 0 |
| Venezia | 2021–22 | Serie A | 0 | 0 | — | | 1 | 0 | — | | — | | 1 | 0 |
| Venezia | 2022–23 | Serie B | 3 | 0 | — | | 0 | 0 | — | | — | | 3 | 0 |
| Venezia | 2023–24 | Serie B | 9 | 0 | — | | 0 | 0 | — | | — | | 9 | 0 |
| Venezia | 2024–25 | Serie A | 0 | 0 | — | | 0 | 0 | — | | — | | 0 | 0 |
| Venezia | Total | | 12 | 0 | — | | 1 | 0 | — | | — | | 13 | 0 |
| Lecco (loan) | 2020–21 | Serie C | 9 | 0 | — | | — | | — | | — | | 9 | 0 |
| Vis Pesaro (loan) | 2020–21 | Serie C | 11 | 0 | — | | — | | — | | — | | 11 | 0 |
| Portuguesa | 2025 | Série D | 15 | 0 | 0 | 0 | 0 | 0 | — | | — | | 15 | 0 |
| Portuguesa | 2026 | Série D | 15 | 0 | 9 | 0 | 3 | 0 | — | | — | | 27 | 0 |
| Portuguesa | Total | | 30 | 0 | 9 | 0 | 3 | 0 | — | | — | | 42 | 0 |
| Mirassol (loan) | 2025 | Série A | 0 | 0 | — | | — | | — | | — | | 0 | 0 |
| Palmeiras | 2026 | Série A | 0 | 0 | — | | — | | — | | — | | 0 | 0 |
| Career total | | | 62 | 0 | 9 | 0 | 4 | 0 | 0 | 0 | 0 | 0 | 75 | 0 |

== Honours ==
Brazil U17

- South American U-17 Championship: 2015
