= Domen Črnigoj =

Slovenian footballer (born 1995)

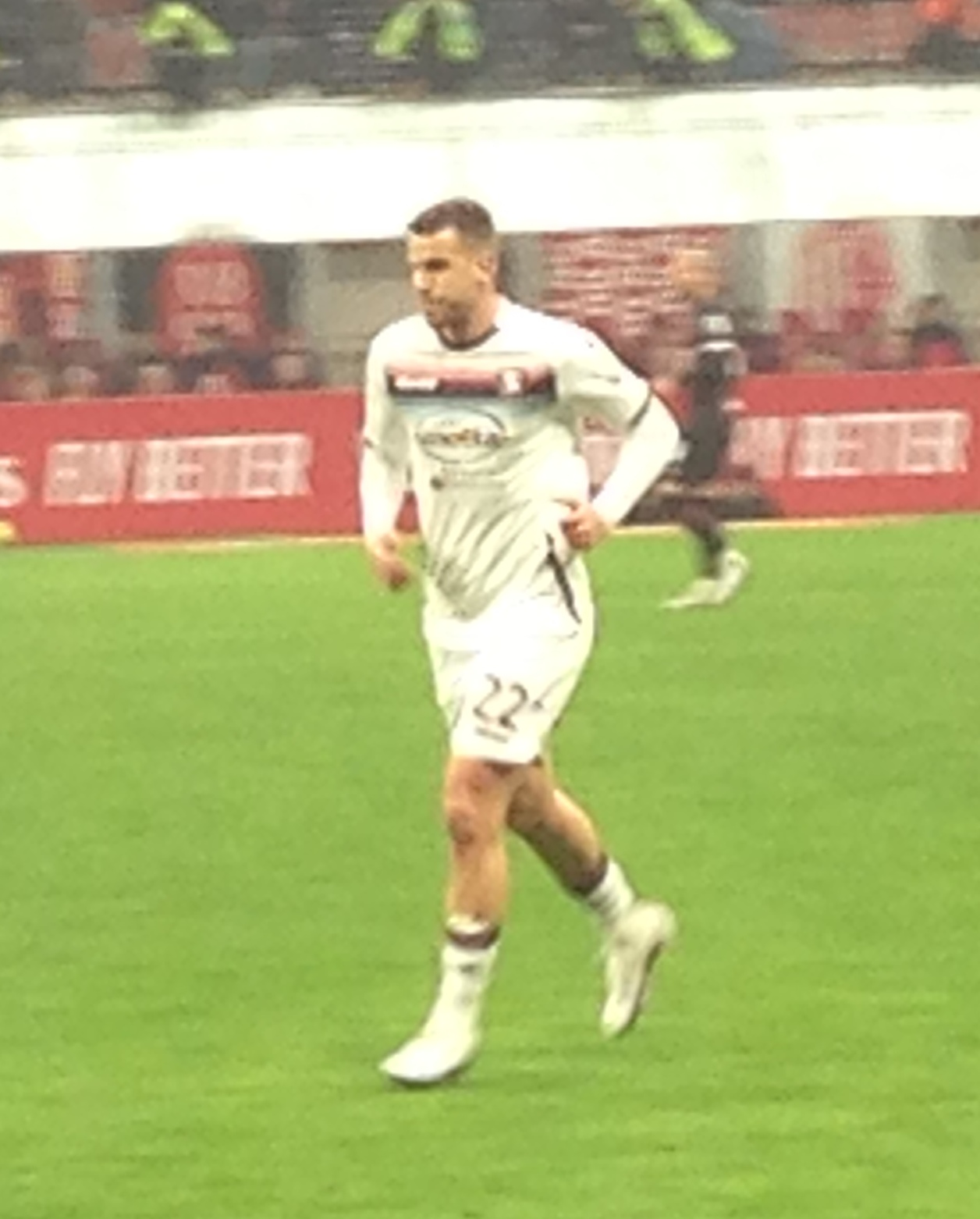
- Črnigoj with Salernitana in 2023

Personal information
- Date of birth: 18 November 1995 (age 30)
- Place of birth: Koper, Slovenia
- Height: 1.88 m (6 ft 2 in)
- Position: Midfielder

Team information
- Current team: PAC Omonia 29M

Youth career
- –2012: Koper

Senior career*
Years	Team	Apps	(Gls)
2012–2015	Koper	89	(2)
2015–2020	Lugano	113	(5)
2020–2025	Venezia	90	(9)
2023	→ Salernitana (loan)	7	(0)
2023–2024	→ Reggiana (loan)	16	(0)
2025–2026	Triestina	16	(0)
2026	Südtirol	19	(1)
2026–	PAC Omonia 29M	5	(1)

International career
2011–2012	Slovenia U17	6	(0)
2013	Slovenia U19	3	(3)
2014–2016	Slovenia U21	12	(0)
2018–2022	Slovenia	26	(3)
- * Club domestic league appearances and goals as of 10 November 2026

Domen Črnigoj (born 18 November 1995) is a Slovenian professional footballer who plays as a midfielder for Cypriot First Division club PAC Omonia 29M.

== Club career ==
Črnigoj made his Slovenian PrvaLiga debut for Koper on 1 August 2012 against Aluminij, replacing Denis Popović after 87 minutes of the match. In August 2015, he transferred to Swiss Super League club Lugano.

In August 2020, Črnigoj signed a three-year contract with Serie B club Venezia. In November 2021, he extended his contract until 2025. On 26 January 2023, he signed for Serie A club Salernitana on loan until the end of the season with the option to make the move permanent. On 29 July 2025, his contract with Venezia was terminated by mutual consent.

On 13 January 2026, Črnigoj signed with Südtirol in Serie B until the end of the 2025–26 season, with an option to extend for another year.

== International career ==
On 23 March 2018, Črnigoj debuted for the Slovenia national team in a 3–0 away friendly defeat against Austria, coming on as a 77th-minute substitute for Josip Iličić.

== Career statistics ==
=== Club ===
As of match played 22 December 2024

Appearances and goals by club, season and competition
Club	Season	League			National cup (Note: Includes Slovenian Cup, Swiss Cup, Coppa Italia)		Continental		Other		Total	
Club	Season	Division	Apps	Goals	Apps	Goals	Apps	Goals	Apps	Goals	Apps	Goals
Koper	2012–13	PrvaLiga	21	0	3	0	—		—		24	0
Koper	2013–14	PrvaLiga	33	1	1	0	—		—		34	1
Koper	2014–15	PrvaLiga	28	1	6	0	4 (Note: Appearance(s) in UEFA Europa League)	0	—		38	1
Koper	2015–16	PrvaLiga	7	0	0	0	4	0	—		11	0
Koper	Total		89	2	10	0	8	0	—		107	2
Lugano	2015–16	Super League	26	3	4	1	—		—		30	4
Lugano	2016–17	Super League	30	1	3	0	—		—		33	1
Lugano	2017–18	Super League	28	1	3	1	3	0	—		34	2
Lugano	2018–19	Super League	26	0	4	2	—		—		30	2
Lugano	2019–20	Super League	3	0	0	0	1	0	—		4	0
Lugano	Total		113	5	14	4	4	0	—		131	9
Venezia	2020–21	Serie B	30	3	2	0	—		5 (Note: Appearance(s) in Serie B play-offs)	0	37	3
Venezia	2021–22	Serie A	34	3	3	1	—		—		37	4
Venezia	2022–23	Serie B	18	3	0	0	—		—		18	3
Venezia	2024–25	Serie A	8	0	1	0	—		—		9	0
Venezia	Total		90	9	6	1	—		5	0	101	10
Salernitana (loan)	2022–23	Serie A	7	0	0	0	—		—		7	0
Reggiana (loan)	2023–24	Serie B	16	0	1	0	—		—		17	0
Career total			315	16	31	5	12	0	5	0	363	21

=== International ===
Scores and results list Slovenia's goal tally first, score column indicates score after each Črnigoj goal.

List of international goals scored by Domen Črnigoj
No.	Date	Venue	Opponent	Score	Result	Competition
1	10 June 2019	Daugava Stadium, Riga, Latvia	Latvia	1–0	5–0	UEFA Euro 2020 qualification
2	10 June 2019	Daugava Stadium, Riga, Latvia	Latvia	2–0	5–0	UEFA Euro 2020 qualification
3	1 June 2021	Toše Proeski Arena, Skopje, North Macedonia	North Macedonia	1–1	1–1	Friendly
