= Luca Fiordilino =

Italian footballer (born 1996)

Personal information
- Full name: Luca Antonio Fiordilino
- Date of birth: 25 July 1996 (age 30)
- Place of birth: Palermo, Italy
- Height: 1.78 m (5 ft 10 in)
- Position: Defensive midfielder

Team information
- Current team: Inter Milan U23
- Number: 8

Youth career
- 2013–2015: Palermo

Senior career*
Years	Team	Apps	(Gls)
2015–2019	Palermo	27	(0)
2015–2016	→ Cosenza (loan)	32	(0)
2016–2017	→ Lecce (loan)	26	(0)
2019–2025	Venezia	101	(4)
2023	→ Südtirol (loan)	19	(0)
2023–2024	→ Feralpisalò (loan)	34	(0)
2025	Triestina	18	(2)
2025–	Inter Milan U23	34	(2)

International career
2017	Italy B	1	(0)
- * Club domestic league appearances and goals as of 30 April 2026

Luca Antonio Fiordilino (born 25 July 1996) is an Italian professional footballer who plays as a defensive midfielder for Serie C Group A club Inter Milan Under-23.

== Club career ==
Fiordilino started his career at U.S. Città di Palermo in the youth system.

In July 2015, he was loaned to Cosenza of Lega Pro. In July 2016, he moved to Lega Pro side Lecce on loan.

On 24 July 2019, he signed a 3-year contract with Venezia. On 19 January 2023, Fiordilino joined Südtirol on loan with an option to buy.

On 28 August 2023, Fiordilino joined Feralpisalò on loan with an obligation to buy.

In January 2025, Fiordilino moved to Triestina on a three-year contract.

On 8 August 2025, Fiordilino joined Serie C club Inter Milan Under-23 as a free agent.

== Career statistics ==
=== Club ===
As of match played 14 August 2026

Appearances and goals by club, season and competition
Club	Season	League			National Cup (Note: Includes Coppa Italia, Coppa Italia Serie C)		Europe		Other		Total	
Club	Season	Division	Apps	Goals	Apps	Goals	Apps	Goals	Apps	Goals	Apps	Goals
Cosenza (loan)	2015–16	Lega Pro	32	0	2	0	—		—		34	0
Lecce (loan)	2016–17	Lega Pro	25	0	4	0	—		1 (Note: Appearance(s) in Lega Pro/Serie C play-off)	0	30	0
Palermo	2017–18	Serie B	12	0	0	0	—		2 (Note: Appearance(s) in Serie B play-off)	0	14	0
Palermo	2018–19	Serie B	16	0	2	0	—		—		18	0
Palermo	Total		28	0	2	0	—		2	0	32	0
Venezia	2019–20	Serie B	35	0	2	0	—		—		37	0
Venezia	2020–21	Serie B	37	4	2	0	—		3	0	42	4
Venezia	2021–22	Serie A	15	0	3	0	—		—		18	0
Venezia	2022–23	Serie B	14	0	0	0	—		—		14	0
Venezia	2023–24	Serie B	0	0	1	0	—		—		1	0
Venezia	Total		101	4	8	0	—		3	0	112	4
Südtirol (loan)	2022–23	Serie B	16	0	0	0	—		3	0	19	0
Feralpisalò (loan)	2023–24	Serie B	34	0	1	0	—		—		35	0
Triestina	2024–25	Serie C	18	2	0	0	—		2 (Note: Appearances in Serie C play-out)	0	20	2
Inter Milan U23	2025–26	Serie C	34	2	2	0	—		—		36	2
Inter Milan U23	2026–27	Serie C	0	0	1	0	—		—		1	0
Inter Milan U23	Total		34	2	3	0	—		—		37	2
Career total			288	8	19	0	—		11	0	319	8
