= Michaël Cuisance =

French footballer (born 1999)

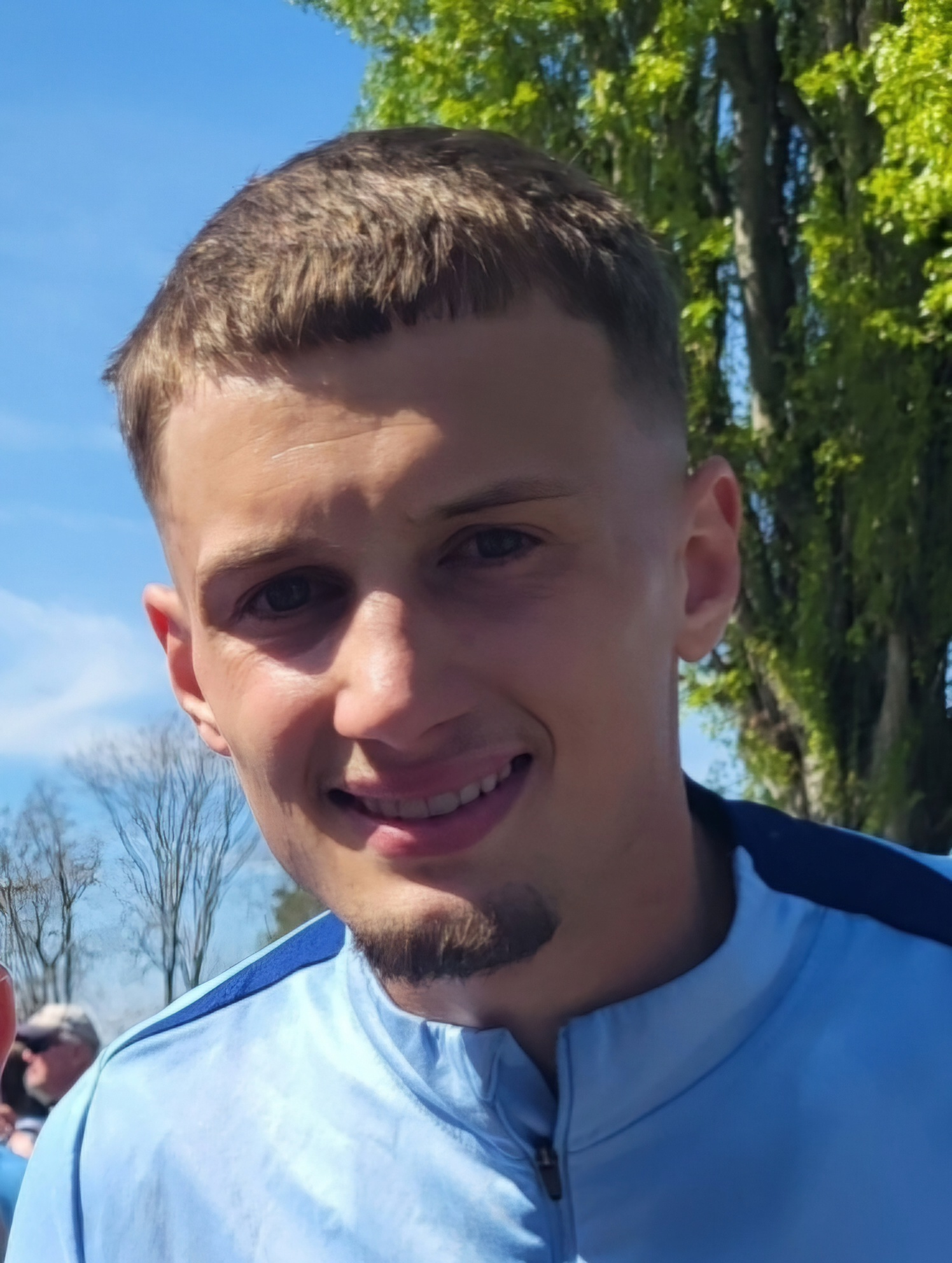
- Cuisance in 2025

Personal information
- Full name: Michaël Bruno Dominique Cuisance
- Date of birth: 16 August 1999 (age 27)
- Place of birth: Strasbourg, France
- Height: 1.81 m (5 ft 11 in)
- Position: Central midfielder

Team information
- Current team: Lens
- Number: 27

Youth career
- 2005–2006: FC Strasbourg Koenigshoffen 06
- 2006–2007: ASPTT Strasbourg
- 2007–2012: Strasbourg
- 2012–2014: Schiltigheim
- 2014–2017: Nancy

Senior career*
| Years | Team | Apps | (Gls) |
| 2016–2017 | Nancy II | 1 | (0) |
| 2017–2018 | Borussia Mönchengladbach II | 2 | (1) |
| 2017–2019 | Borussia Mönchengladbach | 35 | (0) |
| 2019–2020 | Bayern Munich II | 5 | (2) |
| 2019–2022 | Bayern Munich | 11 | (1) |
| 2020–2021 | → Marseille (loan) | 23 | (2) |
| 2022–2024 | Venezia | 26 | (2) |
| 2023 | → Sampdoria (loan) | 12 | (0) |
| 2023–2024 | → VfL Osnabrück (loan) | 25 | (3) |
| 2024–2026 | Hertha BSC | 63 | (9) |
| 2026– | Lens | 8 | (0) |

International career
| 2014–2015 | France U16 | 16 | (1) |
| 2015–2016 | France U17 | 13 | (1) |
| 2016 | France U18 | 5 | (2) |
| 2017–2018 | France U19 | 15 | (2) |
| 2018–2019 | France U20 | 13 | (2) |
- * Club domestic league appearances and goals as of 30 October 2026

Michaël Bruno Dominique Cuisance (born 16 August 1999) is a French professional footballer who plays as a central midfielder for Ligue 1 club Lens. He has also represented France up to the under-20 level.

== Early life ==
Cuisance was born and raised in Strasbourg, Alsace.

== Club career ==
=== Early career ===
Cuisance progressed through AS Nancy's youth academy.

=== Borussia Mönchengladbach ===
On 9 May 2017, Cuisance signed for Bundesliga club Borussia Mönchengladbach. He made his first team debut on 19 September 2017 in a 2–0 home win against VfB Stuttgart in the league. He came on at halftime, replacing Christoph Kramer.

Cuisance was voted Mönchengladbach's player of the year for the 2017–18 season, as he produced many excellent performances from midfield for the club.

=== Bayern Munich ===
On 17 August 2019, Cuisance signed for Bundesliga club Bayern Munich for a fee of nearly €10 million until 2024. He made his debut on 31 August in a 6–1 win against Mainz 05, when he came on as a substitute for Thiago in the 79th minute. On 27 June 2020, Cuisance scored his first Bundesliga goal in a 4–0 win against VfL Wolfsburg.

On 4 July 2020, Cuisance won the 2019–20 DFB-Pokal cup when he was named as an unused substitute in the 4–2 victory against Bayer Leverkusen. On 23 August, he became a Champions League winner, as an unused sub, in a 1–0 win against PSG in the UEFA Champions League final, the win saw Cuisance complete the treble after winning the 2019–20 Bundesliga with the side.

He also won the 2020 UEFA Super Cup on 24 September 2020, when he was named as an unused substitute in the 2–1 win against Sevilla.

On 1 October 2020, he failed a medical test prior to a proposed transfer to Leeds United; thus, he remained at Bayern Munich. Cuisance however claimed after signing for Marseille that he did not fail the medical at Leeds, with Marseille's Head of Football stating "We did not find any issues with his medical", "He is completely available, at 100 per cent."

==== Marseille (loan) ====
On 5 October 2020, Cuisance joined Marseille on a one-year loan with an option to buy. He scored his first goal for the club, an 88th-minute winner, after coming on a substitute in a 1–0 win over Rennes on 10 March 2021.

=== Venezia ===
On 3 January 2022, Cuisance signed for Venezia until 2025.

==== Loan to Sampdoria ====
On 30 January 2023, Cuisance joined Sampdoria on a loan without an option to buy.

==== Loan to VfL Osnabrück ====
On 1 September 2023, recently-promoted 2. Bundesliga side VfL Osnabrück announced the signing of Cuisance on a year-long loan from Venezia.

Although Osnabrück were relegated, Cuisance had some good performances, including in a 2-1 win over Hamburger SV after which he was named in the league's team of the week by Kicker.

=== Hertha BSC ===
Cuisance joined Hertha BSC in June 2024, signing a contract until 2027, for a fee of €300,000. He scored his first goal for the club on 31 August 2024, the winning goal in a 4-3 win against 1. FC Kaiserslautern. Since joining Hertha, Cuisance has been noted for his professionalism and work ethic, which had been often criticised in the past.

=== Lens ===
On 26 June 2026, Ligue 1 club Lens announced that they had reached an agreement with Hertha to sign Cuisance on a four-year deal.

== International career ==
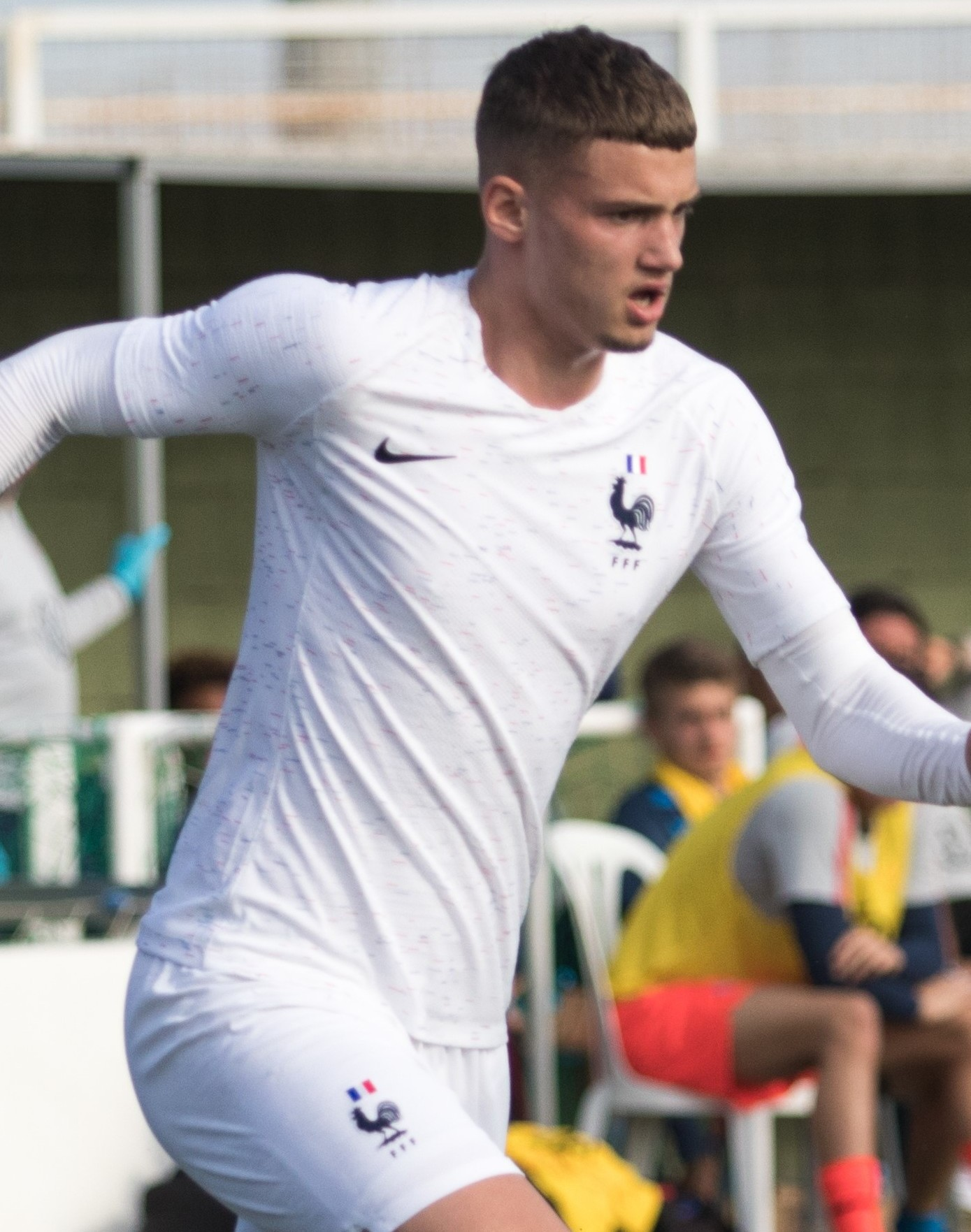
Cuisance playing for France U20 in 2019

Cuisance has represented France up until France U20's level. He was named in the UEFA European Under-19 Championship Team of the Tournament during the 2018 tournament whilst playing for France U19's.

He was selected by Coach Bernard Diomède in the squad for the 2019 FIFA U-20 World Cup where Cuisance scored two goals and gained one assist in his 4 appearances in the tournament.

In July 2020, Cuisance revealed to L'Equipe that he was aiming to play regularly at Bayern Munich to gain a place in the France senior national side.

== Style of play ==
Cuisance is a creative player who plays as a central midfielder, he can also play as an attacking midfielder or as a deep-lying midfielder. His style of play was compared to Mesut Özil by Bundesliga official site. With Bayern Munich Sporting Director Hasan Salihamidžić describing of Cuisance that 'Michaël's strengths are in his possession of the football. He has a great technique, a strong left foot and a great mentality'.

Cuisance cites his idol as former France international midfielder Zinedine Zidane.

== Career statistics ==
As of match played 30 October 2026

Appearances and goals by club, season and competition
| Club | Season | League | | | National cup (Note: Includes DFB-Pokal, Coupe de France) | | Europe | | Other | | Total | |
| Club | Season | Division | Apps | Goals | Apps | Goals | Apps | Goals | Apps | Goals | Apps | Goals |
|---|---|---|---|---|---|---|---|---|---|---|---|---|
| Nancy II | 2015–16 | CFA 2 | 1 | 0 | — | | — | | — | | 1 | 0 |
| Borussia Mönchengladbach II | 2017–18 | Regionalliga West | 1 | 0 | — | | — | | — | | 1 | 0 |
| Borussia Mönchengladbach II | 2018–19 | Regionalliga West | 1 | 1 | — | | — | | — | | 1 | 1 |
| Borussia Mönchengladbach II | Total | | 2 | 1 | — | | — | | — | | 2 | 1 |
| Borussia Mönchengladbach | 2017–18 | Bundesliga | 24 | 0 | 2 | 0 | — | | — | | 26 | 0 |
| Borussia Mönchengladbach | 2018–19 | Bundesliga | 11 | 0 | 2 | 0 | — | | — | | 13 | 0 |
| Borussia Mönchengladbach | Total | | 35 | 0 | 4 | 0 | — | | — | | 39 | 0 |
| Bayern Munich II | 2019–20 | 3. Liga | 5 | 2 | — | | — | | — | | 5 | 2 |
| Bayern Munich | 2019–20 | Bundesliga | 9 | 1 | 1 | 0 | 0 | 0 | 0 | 0 | 10 | 1 |
| Bayern Munich | 2020–21 | Bundesliga | 1 | 0 | — | | — | | — | | 1 | 0 |
| Bayern Munich | 2021–22 | Bundesliga | 1 | 0 | 1 | 1 | 0 | 0 | 0 | 0 | 2 | 1 |
| Bayern Munich | Total | | 11 | 1 | 2 | 1 | 0 | 0 | — | | 13 | 2 |
| Marseille (loan) | 2020–21 | Ligue 1 | 23 | 2 | 1 | 0 | 6 (Note: Appearances in UEFA Champions League) | 0 | — | | 30 | 2 |
| Venezia | 2021–22 | Serie A | 13 | 0 | 0 | 0 | — | | — | | 13 | 0 |
| Venezia | 2022–23 | Serie B | 13 | 2 | 0 | 0 | — | | — | | 13 | 2 |
| Venezia | Total | | 26 | 2 | 0 | 0 | — | | — | | 26 | 2 |
| Sampdoria (loan) | 2022–23 | Serie A | 12 | 0 | — | | — | | — | | 12 | 0 |
| VfL Osnabrück (loan) | 2023–24 | 2. Bundesliga | 25 | 3 | 0 | 0 | — | | — | | 25 | 3 |
| Hertha BSC | 2024–25 | 2. Bundesliga | 32 | 6 | 2 | 1 | — | | — | | 34 | 7 |
| Hertha BSC | 2025–26 | 2. Bundesliga | 31 | 3 | 4 | 1 | — | | — | | 35 | 4 |
| Hertha BSC | Total | | 63 | 9 | 6 | 2 | — | | — | | 69 | 11 |
| Lens | 2026–27 | Ligue 1 | 8 | 0 | 0 | 0 | 2 | 0 | 1 (Note: Appearance in Trophée des Champions) | 0 | 11 | 0 |
| Career total | | | 211 | 20 | 13 | 3 | 8 | 0 | 1 | 0 | 233 | 23 |

== Honours ==
Bayern Munich II

- 3. Liga: 2019–20

Bayern Munich

- Bundesliga: 2019–20
- DFB-Pokal: 2019–20
- UEFA Champions League: 2019–20
- UEFA Super Cup: 2020

Lens

- Trophée des Champions: 2026

Individual

- Borussia Mönchengladbach Player of the Season: 2017–18
- UEFA European Under-19 Championship Team of the Tournament: 2018
