= Antonio Junior Vacca =

Italian footballer (born 1990)

Personal information
- Date of birth: 13 May 1990 (age 36)
- Place of birth: Naples, Italy
- Height: 1.70 m (5 ft 7 in)
- Position: Defensive midfielder

Team information
- Current team: Scafatese

Youth career
- –2009: Benevento

Senior career*
Years	Team	Apps	(Gls)
2010–2013	Benevento	70	(6)
2012–2013	→ Barletta (loan)	3	(0)
2013	→ Livorno (loan)	2	(0)
2013–2015	Catanzaro	31	(0)
2015	Reggiana	18	(0)
2016–2018	Foggia	72	(4)
2018–2019	Parma	11	(0)
2018–2019	→ Casertana (loan)	27	(0)
2019–2022	Venezia	51	(0)
2023–2024	Foggia	15	(0)
2024–	Scafatese	0	(0)

International career
2011	Italy U20	1	(0)
- * Club domestic league appearances and goals as of 20 January 2024

Antonio Junior Vacca (born 13 May 1990) is an Italian professional footballer who plays as a defensive midfielder for Serie D club Scafatese.

== Club career ==
Vacca made his Serie C debut for Benevento on 31 January 2010 in a game against Arezzo.

On 16 July 2019, Vacca signed a three-year contract with Venezia. His contract with Venezia was terminated by mutual consent on 8 September 2022.

On 19 January 2023, Vacca returned to Foggia on a 1.5-year contract. The contract was terminated by mutual consent on 24 January 2024. After leaving Foggia, Vacca signed for Serie D club Scafatese in August 2024.

== Personal life ==
On 26 January 2019, Vacca was a victim of a robbery by two criminals who tried to steal his jewels, however, they were not able to take the jewels, but his car was damaged by a gunshot; Vacca was not harmed.

== Career statistics ==
=== Club ===
As of match played 23 August 2023

Appearances and goals by club, season and competition
Club	Season	League			National cup (Note: Includes Coppa Italia, Coppa Italia Serie C)		Europe		Other		Total	
Club	Season	Division	Apps	Goals	Apps	Goals	Apps	Goals	Apps	Goals	Apps	Goals
Benevento	2008–09	Lega Pro 1	1	0	0	0	—		—		1	0
Benevento	2009–10	Lega Pro 1	11	1	0	0	—		2 (Note: Appearance(s) in Lega Pro/Serie C play-off)	0	13	1
Benevento	2010–11	Lega Pro 1	24	1	2	0	—		—		26	1
Benevento	2011–12	Lega Pro 1	23	4	2	1	—		—		25	5
Benevento	2013–14	Lega Pro 1	10	0	4	0	—		—		14	0
Benevento	Total		69	6	8	1	—		2	0	79	7
Barletta (loan)	2012–13	Lega Pro 1	3	0	2	0	—		—		5	0
Livorno (loan)	2012–13	Serie B	2	0	0	0	—		—		2	0
Catanzaro	2013–14	Lega Pro 1	10	0	0	0	—		1	0	11	0
Catanzaro	2014–15	Lega Pro	20	0	2	0	—		—		22	0
Catanzaro	Total		30	0	2	0	—		1	0	33	0
Reggiana	2014–15	Lega Pro	15	0	0	0	—		3	0	18	0
Reggiana	2015–16	Lega Pro	0	0	1	0	—		—		1	0
Reggiana	Total		15	0	1	0	—		3	0	19	0
Foggia	2015–16	Lega Pro	15	2	5	1	—		5	0	25	3
Foggia	2016–17	Lega Pro	32	1	0	0	—		2 (Note: Appearance(s) in Supercoppa di Lega Pro)	1	34	2
Foggia	2017–18	Serie B	18	0	2	0	—		—		20	0
Foggia	Total		65	3	7	1	—		7	1	79	5
Parma	2017–18	Serie B	11	0	0	0	—		—		11	0
Casertana (loan)	2018–19	Serie C	27	0	1	0	—		1	0	29	0
Venezia	2019–20	Serie B	16	0	1	0	—		—		17	0
Venezia	2020–21	Serie B	14	0	1	0	—		0	0	15	0
Venezia	2021–22	Serie A	21	0	1	0	—		—		22	0
Venezia	Total		51	0	3	0	—		0	0	54	0
Foggia	2022–23	Serie C	2	0	0	0	—		5	0	7	0
Career total			275	9	24	2	—		19	1	318	12
