= Mattia Aramu =

Italian footballer (born 1995)

Personal information
- Date of birth: 14 May 1995 (age 31)
- Place of birth: Cirié, Italy
- Height: 1.80 m (5 ft 11 in)
- Position: Attacking midfielder

Team information
- Current team: Livorno
- Number: 7

Youth career
- 2003–2014: Torino

Senior career*
Years	Team	Apps	(Gls)
2013–2018	Torino	1	(0)
2014–2015	→ Trapani (loan)	24	(2)
2015–2016	→ Livorno (loan)	23	(5)
2017	→ Pro Vercelli (loan)	15	(1)
2017–2018	→ Virtus Entella (loan)	27	(1)
2018–2019	Siena	34	(7)
2019–2023	Venezia	101	(28)
2022–2023	→ Genoa (loan)	26	(2)
2023–2025	Genoa	0	(0)
2023–2024	→ Bari (loan)	19	(0)
2024–2025	→ Mantova (loan)	25	(2)
2026	Ternana	9	(1)
2026–	Livorno	2	(0)

International career
2011–2012	Italy U17	9	(1)
2012–2013	Italy U18	3	(0)
2014–2015	Italy U20	8	(1)
2015–2017	Italy U21	1	(0)
- * Club domestic league appearances and goals as of 29 August 2026

Mattia Aramu (born 14 May 1995) is an Italian professional footballer who plays as an attacking midfielder for Serie C Group B club Livorno.

== Early life ==
Aramu was born to a father from Turin and a mother from Como, and his paternal grandfather was of Sardinian origin.

== Club career ==
=== Early career ===
Aramu began his career with amateur club A.S.D. Real Leini. At only eight years old he was noticed by former Torino players Antonio Comi and Silvano Benedetti and joined the Torino youth. In 2013–14 he was one of the stars of the Primavera side of Moreno Longo that reached the finals of the tournament, lost on penalties to Chievo Verona. He finished the season with 20 goals scored between the league and cup (with two fundamental goals scored in the final phase of the tournament against Lazio). Throughout the season he was regularly called up to the first team by coach Giampiero Ventura.

==== Loan to Trapani ====
In the 2014–15 season Aramu joined Trapani on loan. He made his debut on 30 August 2014 against Pescara in a Serie B game. He replaced Giovanni Abate after 53 minutes. He scored his first goal in Serie B on 1 November 2014, deciding the match against Brescia, 3–2.

==== Loan to Livorno ====
On 5 August 2015, Aramu was loaned to Livorno. He scored his first goal for Livorno against Ternana, then scored two braces against Ascoli and Lanciano at the end of the season that were not enough for Livorno to avoid relegation to Lega Pro.

=== Torino ===
Aramu made his official debut for Torino on 14 August 2016 in the third round of Coppa Italia against Pro Vercelli, entering as a substitute for Adem Ljajic in the 87th minute.

=== Venezia ===
On 10 July 2019, Aramu signed a three-year contract with Venezia.

=== Genoa ===
On 25 August 2022, Venezia reached agreement with Genoa under which Aramu moved to Genoa on loan with a subsequent obligation to buy, and Antonio Candela and cash moved in the opposite direction.

On 1 September 2023, Aramu moved to Bari on loan. Bari held an obligation to sign him permanently in case of promotion to Serie A, which they did not achieve.

On 25 July 2024, Aramu moved to Mantova on loan with an option to buy.

== International career ==
On 5 August 2015 he was called up to Italy under-21 team by Luigi Di Biagio for the first friendly of the new biennium to be played on 12 August in Telki against Hungary.

== Career statistics ==
=== Club ===
As of match played 1 May 2022

Appearances and goals by club, season and competition
Club	Season	League			Cup		Europe		Other		Total	
Club	Season	Division	Apps	Goals	Apps	Goals	Apps	Goals	Apps	Goals	Apps	Goals
Trapani (loan)	2014–15	Serie B	24	2	1	0	—		—		25	2
Livorno (loan)	2015–16	Serie B	23	5	0	0	—		—		23	5
Torino	2016–17	Serie A	1	0	1	0	—		—		2	0
Entella (loan)	2017–18	Serie B	29	1	0	0	—		—		29	1
Siena	2018–19	Serie C	34	7	0	0	—		—		34	7
Venezia	2019–20	Serie B	31	11	2	2	—		—		33	13
Venezia	2020–21	Serie B	39	10	0	0	—		—		39	10
Venezia	2021–22	Serie A	31	7	1	0	—		—		32	7
Venezia	Total		101	28	3	2	—		—		104	30
Career total			212	43	5	2	—		—		217	45
