= Pietro Ceccaroni =

Italian footballer

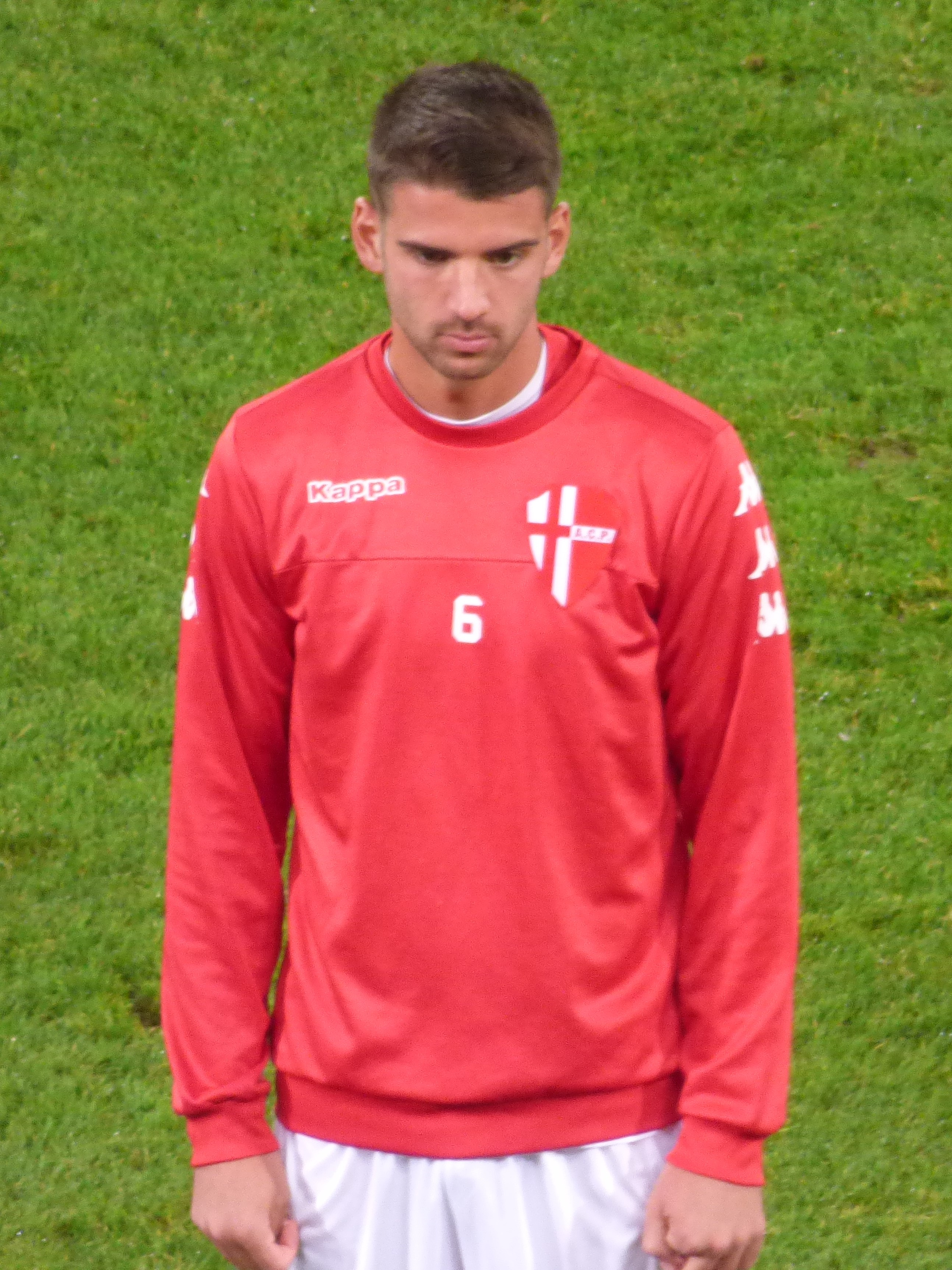
- Ceccaroni in 2018

Personal information
- Date of birth: 21 December 1995 (age 30)
- Place of birth: Sarzana, Italy
- Height: 1.88 m (6 ft 2 in)
- Position: Centre back

Team information
- Current team: Palermo
- Number: 32

Youth career
- –2014: Spezia

Senior career*
Years	Team	Apps	(Gls)
2014–2020	Spezia	31	(0)
2015–2016	→ SPAL (loan)	24	(0)
2018–2019	→ Padova (loan)	16	(0)
2019–2020	→ Venezia (loan)	31	(1)
2020–2023	Venezia	97	(6)
2023	→ Lecce (loan)	2	(0)
2023–	Palermo	95	(7)

International career
2014	Italy U19	4	(0)
2014–2016	Italy U20	5	(0)
- * Club domestic league appearances and goals as of 12 May 2026

Pietro Ceccaroni (born 21 December 1995) is an Italian professional footballer who plays as a centre back for Serie B club Palermo.

== Club career ==
=== Spezia ===
Ceccaroni is a youth exponent from Spezia. He made his debut on 1 November 2014 against Pescara in a Serie B match. He came on as a 63rd-minute substitute for Niko Datković in a 2–1 away win. On 5 August 2017, he scored his first goal with Spezia in the Coppa Italia match against Reggiana, which ended in a 3–0 win for his team.

==== Loan to Padova ====
On 3 July 2018, he joined Padova on a season-long loan. Padova held an option to purchase his rights at the end of the loan term.

=== Venezia ===
On 7 August 2019, he joined Venezia on loan with a purchase option. On 23 August 2020, Venezia exercised the option and Ceccaroni signed a 3-year contract with the club.

==== Loan to Lecce ====
On 31 January 2023, Ceccaroni was loaned to Lecce, with an option to buy.

=== Palermo ===
On 7 July 2023, Ceccaroni signed a four-year deal with Palermo.

== Career statistics ==
=== Club ===
As of match played 23 August 2023

Appearances and goals by club, season and competition
Club	Season	League			National Cup (Note: Includes Coppa Italia, Coppa Italia Serie C)		Europe		Other		Total	
Club	Season	Division	Apps	Goals	Apps	Goals	Apps	Goals	Apps	Goals	Apps	Goals
Spezia	2013–14	Serie B	0	0	1	0	—		—		1	0
Spezia	2014–15	Serie B	1	0	0	0	—		—		1	0
Spezia	2016–17	Serie B	19	0	3	0	—		1 (Note: Appearance(s) in Serie B play-off)	0	23	0
Spezia	2017–18	Serie B	10	0	2	1	—		—		12	1
Spezia	Total		30	0	6	0	—		1	0	37	1
SPAL (loan)	2015–16	Lega Pro	22	0	5	0	—		2 (Note: Appearance(s) in Supercoppa di Lega Pro)	0	29	0
Padova (loan)	2018–19	Serie B	16	0	1	0	—		—		17	0
Venezia	2019–20	Serie B	31	1	2	0	—		—		33	1
Venezia	2020–21	Serie B	37	3	0	0	—		5	0	42	3
Venezia	2021–22	Serie A	35	2	1	0	—		—		36	2
Venezia	2022–23	Serie B	20	1	0	0	—		—		20	1
Venezia	Total		123	7	3	0	—		5	0	131	7
Lecce (loan)	2022–23	Serie A	2	0	0	0	—		—		2	0
Career total			193	7	15	1	—		8	0	216	8
