= Niki Mäenpää =

Finnish footballer (born 1985)

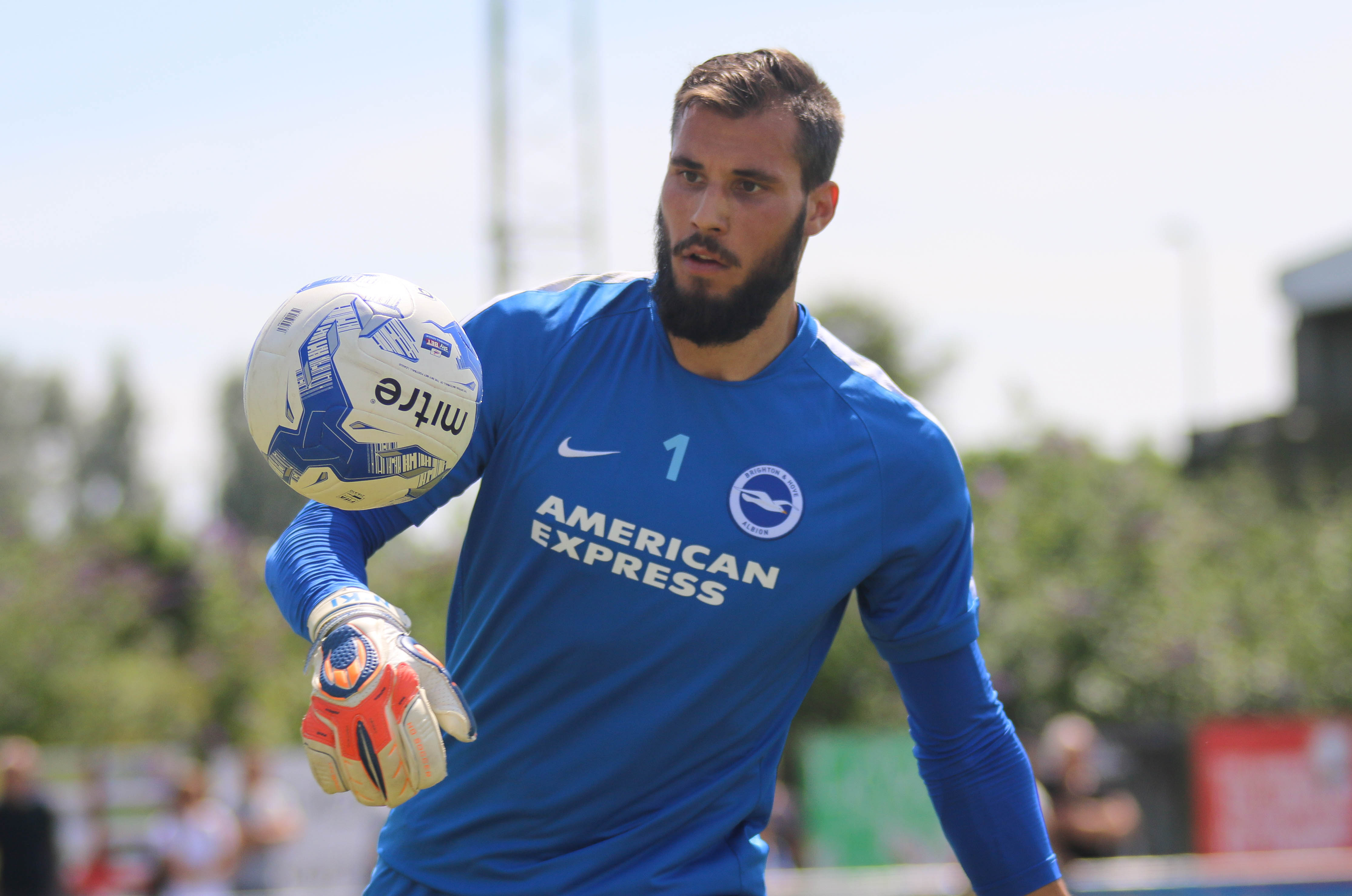
- Mäenpää playing in a pre-season friendly for Brighton & Hove Albion in 2015

Personal information
- Full name: Niki Emil Antonio Mäenpää
- Date of birth: 23 January 1985 (age 41)
- Place of birth: Espoo, Finland
- Height: 1.90 m (6 ft 3 in)
- Position: Goalkeeper

Team information
- Current team: Athens Kallithea
- Number: 85

Youth career
- 1991–1996: Kasiysi
- 1997–2003: HJK

Senior career*
Years	Team	Apps	(Gls)
2003–2006	Lens B	17	(0)
2006	→ Telstar (loan)	0	(0)
2006–2009	Den Bosch	67	(0)
2009–2011	Willem II	18	(0)
2011–2012	AZ	0	(0)
2012–2015	VVV-Venlo	101	(0)
2015–2018	Brighton & Hove Albion	1	(0)
2018–2020	Bristol City	30	(0)
2020–2021	Stoke City	0	(0)
2021–2023	Venezia	25	(0)
2023–2024	HJK	6	(0)
2025–	Athens Kallithea	0	(0)

International career^{‡}
2003	Finland U18	5	(0)
2004	Finland U19	5	(0)
2005–2006	Finland U21	13	(0)
2008–2021	Finland	27	(0)
Medal record
Men's football
Representing Finland
Baltic Cup
Second place	Baltic Cup	2012
Third place	Baltic Cup	2014
- * Club domestic league appearances and goals as of 22 October 2024 ‡ National team caps and goals as of 31 December 2021

Niki Emil Antonio Mäenpää (Finnish pronunciation: [ˈniki ˈmæempæː]; born 23 January 1985) is a Finnish professional footballer who plays as a goalkeeper for Super League Greece club Athens Kallithea. He began his senior club career playing for the Lens reserve team, before signing with Den Bosch at age 21 in 2006.

Mäenpää made his international debut for Finland in June 2008, at the age of 23, and has since had over 20 caps, including appearing in 2014 FIFA World Cup qualification.

== Club career ==
=== Lens ===
Mäenpää was born in Espoo, Finland. He started his senior career at the RC Lens reserve team in 2003. During winter 2006 transfer window, he joined Telstar on loan until the end of the season. He did not feature in any Ligue 1 match in the first team of RC Lens. His contract with Lens expired on 30 June 2006.

=== FC Den Bosch ===
During summer 2006, Mäenpää joined Dutch Eerste Divisie side FC Den Bosch on a free transfer. He made his breakthrough in season 2006–07 when he played 27 league matches. He made a total of 67 league appearances during 3 seasons. His contract with FC Den Bosch expired in summer 2009.

=== Willem II ===
In summer 2009, Mäenpää joined Dutch Eredivisie side Willem II on a free transfer, making 18 league appearances. He left Willem II in summer 2011, by terminating his contract after they got relegated to Eerste Divisie.

=== AZ Alkmaar ===
On 3 October 2011, Mäenpää joined AZ Alkmaar on a free transfer on a contract until the end of the season, joining compatriot and team captain Niklas Moisander. However at AZ, he found himself demoted to third-choice, behind Esteban Alvarado and the veteran Erik Heijblok. He left the club after only one season, without making a single appearance for the AZ's first team.

=== VVV-Venlo ===
On 29 May 2012, it was announced that Mäenpää had signed a three-year contract with fellow Eredivisie side VVV-Venlo. Despite being sent off three minutes into his debut match, the fans voted him as best Venlo player of the season 2013–14. In the summer of 2015 he left VVV Venlo on a free transfer after his contract expired

=== Brighton & Hove Albion ===
On 6 July 2015, it was announced that Mäenpää had signed a contract with English side Brighton & Hove Albion following his release from VVV-Venlo. He made his Brighton & Hove Albion league debut in a 3–0 victory over Rotherham at Falmer Stadium on 16 August 2016. At the end of 2017–18 season, he left the club.

=== Bristol City ===
On 1 August 2018, Mäenpää signed for EFL Championship club Bristol City. On 4 August 2018, he made his debut in a match against Nottingham Forest. On 21 May 2019, it was announced an option to extend his contract was triggered and he would be remaining with The Robins for the 2019–20 season.

=== Stoke City ===
Mäenpää signed a short-term contract with Stoke City on 27 November 2020 to act as cover for Josef Bursik following injuries to Adam Davies and Angus Gunn. However he suffered an injury himself in his first training session and Stoke brought in Andy Lonergan.

=== Venezia ===
On 15 February 2021, Mäenpää joined Italian Serie B club Venezia until the end of the 2020–21 season, with an option for the 2021–22 season. In June 2021 it was announced that he had signed a two-year contract to remain at the club until the end of June 2023.

On 14 May 2022, in a Serie A match against AS Roma at Stadio Olimpico, Mäenpää had a man-of-the-match performance with a record-number of 16 saved shots (8 of which came from inside the box). The match ultimately ended in a 1–1 draw, after Venezia's Sofian Kiyine had been sent off with a red card on the 32nd minute.

=== HJK ===
On 4 August 2023, after playing professional football abroad for 20 years, Mäenpää returned to Finland and signed with his former club HJK Helsinki on a deal for the rest of the 2023 season. A couple of weeks later, Mäenpää had made his debuts in the Europa League and in the Finnish premier division Veikkausliiga, at the age of 38.

On 23 May 2024, Mäenpää signed a new deal with HJK for the rest of the 2024 season. On 22 October it was announced that Mäenpää would leave HJK at the end of October after the expiration of his contract.

=== Athens Kallithea ===
On 7 February 2025, Mäenpää signed with Athens Kallithea in Super League Greece.

== International career ==
Mäenpää was 18 years old on 1 April 2003 when he debuted in Finland's youth team in a match against Sweden in Malmö. He played his first game in Finland national under-21 football team 30 March 2004 in Corradino in a match against Malta. He gained 13 caps for Finland's U21-team.

Mäenpää made his debut for the Finland national team on 2 June 2008 in a friendly match in Veritas Stadion, Turku against Belarus when Stuart Baxter chose him for the starting line up. During 2012 he established himself as a regular in the Finland national team and gained six caps. He played his first FIFA World Cup qualification game on 12 October 2012 in Helsinki Olympic Stadium when Mixu Paatelainen chose him for the starting eleven in a match against Georgia. He played one of his best games in March 2013 when Finland got a surprising 1–1 away draw against Spain in qualifying for the 2014 World Cup. He established himself as the national team's regular goalkeeper and played seven out of eight matches in qualification, and 20 matches in total during 2012–2014.

== Career statistics ==
=== Club ===
As of 22 October 2024

Appearances and goals by club, season and competition
Club	Season	League			National cup		Europe		Other		Total	
Club	Season	Division	Apps	Goals	Apps	Goals	Apps	Goals	Apps	Goals	Apps	Goals
Lens B	2003–04	CFA	3	0	—		—		—		3	0
Lens B	2004–05	CFA	14	0	—		—		—		14	0
Lens B	2005–06	CFA	0	0	—		—		—		0	0
Lens B	Total		17	0	—		—		—		17	0
Telstar (loan)	2005–06	Eerste Divisie	0	0	0	0	—		—		0	0
Den Bosch	2006–07	Eerste Divisie	27	0	0	0	—		3 (Note: Appearances in Promotion – Relegation play-offs)	0	30	0
Den Bosch	2007–08	Eerste Divisie	33	0	0	0	—		3	0	36	0
Den Bosch	2008–09	Eerste Divisie	7	0	0	0	—		—		7	0
Den Bosch	Total		67	0	0	0	0	0	6	0	73	0
Willem II	2009–10	Eredivisie	6	0	0	0	—		0	0	6	0
Willem II	2010–11	Eredivisie	12	0	1	0	—		—		13	0
Willem II	Total		18	0	1	0	0	0	0	0	19	0
AZ Alkmaar	2011–12	Eredivisie	0	0	0	0	0 (Note: Appearances in UEFA Europa League)	0	—		0	0
VVV-Venlo	2012–13	Eredivisie	33	0	3	0	—		2	0	38	0
VVV-Venlo	2013–14	Eerste Divisie	33	0	4	0	—		2	0	39	0
VVV-Venlo	2014–15	Eerste Divisie	35	0	2	0	—		4	0	41	0
VVV-Venlo	Total		101	0	9	0	0	0	8	0	118	0
Brighton & Hove Albion	2015–16	Championship	0	0	1	0	—		2	0	3	0
Brighton & Hove Albion	2016–17	Championship	1	0	0	0	—		3	0	4	0
Brighton & Hove Albion	2017–18	Premier League	0	0	1	0	—		1	0	2	0
Brighton & Hove Albion	Total		1	0	2	0	0	0	6	0	9	0
Brighton & Hove Albion U23	2016–17	—			—		—		1 (Note: Appearances in EFL Trophy)	0	1	0
Bristol City	2018–19	Championship	26	0	1	0	—		0	0	27	0
Bristol City	2019–20	Championship	4	0	1	0	—		0	0	5	0
Bristol City	Total		30	0	2	0	—		0	0	32	0
Stoke City	2020–21	Championship	0	0	0	0	—		0	0	0	0
Venezia	2020–21	Serie B	6	0	—		—		5 (Note: Appearances in Serie B – Promotion play-offs)	0	11	0
Venezia	2021–22	Serie A	17	0	0	0	—		—		17	0
Venezia	2022–23	Serie B	2	0	0	0	—		—		2	0
Venezia	Total		25	0	0	0	—		5	0	30	0
HJK	2023	Veikkausliiga	4	0	0	0	7 (Note: Appearances in UEFA Europa League and UEFA Europa Conference League)	0	—		11	0
HJK	2024	Veikkausliiga	2	0	1	0	1 (Note: Appearances in UEFA Champions League)	0	0	0	4	0
HJK	Total		6	0	1	0	8	0	5	0	15	0
Athens Kallithea	2024–25	Super League Greece	0	0	0	0	—		—		0	0
Career total			265	0	15	0	8	0	26	0	314	0

=== International ===
As of 31 March 2021

Appearances and goals by national team and year
National team	Year	Apps	Goals
Finland	2008	2	0
Finland	2009	2	0
Finland	2010	0	0
Finland	2011	0	0
Finland	2012	6	0
Finland	2013	9	0
Finland	2014	5	0
Finland	2015	1	0
Finland	2016	1	0
Finland	2017	0	0
Finland	2018	0	0
Finland	2019	0	0
Finland	2020	0	0
Finland	2021	1	0
Total		27	0

== Honours ==
Finland

- Baltic Cup: runner-up 2012; third place 2014

HJK

- Veikkausliiga: 2023
