= Domenico Rossi (footballer) =

Italian footballer (born 2000)

Personal information
- Date of birth: 9 May 2000 (age 26)
- Place of birth: Busto Arsizio, Italy
- Height: 1.92 m (6 ft 4 in)
- Position: Midfielder

Team information
- Current team: Villa Valle
- Number: 19

Youth career
- –2017: Como
- 2017–2020: Venezia

Senior career*
Years	Team	Apps	(Gls)
2018–2023	Venezia	4	(0)
2021–2022	→ Vis Pesaro (loan)	20	(1)
2022–2023	→ Pro Patria (loan)	1	(0)
2023–2024	Legnano	29	(2)
2024–2025	Sestese		
2025–2026	Caronnese		
2026–	Villa Valle	4	(0)
- * Club domestic league appearances and goals as of 22 February 2026

Domenico Rossi (born 9 May 2000) is an Italian professional footballer who plays as a midfielder for Serie D club Villa Valle.

== Career ==
He joined the youth teams of Venezia in the summer of 2017 and was first called up to the senior squad in 2018.

He made his Serie B debut for Venezia on 17 October 2020 in a game against Cremonese. He substituted Antonio Junior Vacca in the 76th minute of a 0–0 draw.

On 18 July 2021, he joined Vis Pesaro on loan.

On 20 July 2022, Rossi was loaned to Pro Patria.

On 17 July 2023, Rossi's contract with Venezia was terminated by mutual consent.

In February 2025, he began playing in the Kings League with the AlpaK. For the Club World Cup in June, he transferred to Gear7, and in the summer he moved to the Underdogs, where he still plays today.

He was part of the Italian national team squad for both the 2025 and 2026 World Cups.
