= Gabriel Sandberg =

Swedish footballer (born 2003)

Personal information
- Full name: Gabriel Ragnar Hilmer Sandberg
- Date of birth: 10 March 2003 (age 23)
- Place of birth: Nyköping, Sweden
- Height: 1.88 m (6 ft 2 in)
- Position: Midfielder

Team information
- Current team: Oddevold
- Number: 14

Youth career
- –2019: Nyköpings BIS
- 2021–2023: Venezia

Senior career*
Years	Team	Apps	(Gls)
2019–2021	Nyköpings BIS	25	(1)
2022–2024	Venezia	0	(0)
2023	→ KTP (loan)	22	(0)
2024–	Oddevold	63	(10)
- * Club domestic league appearances and goals as of 12 November 2026

Gabriel Ragnar Hilmer Sandberg (born 10 March 2003) is a Swedish professional footballer who plays as a midfielder for Superettan side Oddevold.

== Career statistics ==
As of 25 November 2024.

Appearances and goals by club, season and competition
Club	Season	League			Cup (Note: Includes Svenska Cupen, Coppa Italia and Suomen Cup)		League cup (Note: Includes Finnish League Cup)		Europe		Total	
Club	Season	Division	Apps	Goals	Apps	Goals	Apps	Goals	Apps	Goals	Apps	Goals
Nyköpings BIS	2019	Swedish Division 1	1	0	1	0	–		–		2	0
Nyköpings BIS	2020	Ettan	22	1	1	0	–		–		23	1
Nyköpings BIS	2021	Swedish Division 2	2	0	0	0	–		–		2	0
Nyköpings BIS	Total		25	1	2	0	0	0	0	0	27	1
Venezia	2022–23	Serie B	0	0	1	0	–		–		1	0
KTP (loan)	2023	Veikkausliiga	22	0	5	0	5	0	–		32	0
IK Oddevold	2024	Superettan	26	2	1	0	–		–		27	2
Career total			73	3	9	0	5	0	0	0	87	3
