= Mirza Hasanbegović =

Association football player (born 2001)

Personal information
- Date of birth: 19 July 2001 (age 25)
- Place of birth: Stockholm, Sweden
- Height: 1.93 m (6 ft 4 in)
- Position: Forward

Team information
- Current team: Gefle

Youth career
- –2017: Eskilstuna
- 2018–2019: AIK

Senior career*
Years	Team	Apps	(Gls)
2020	Lokomotiv Plovdiv	1	(0)
2020–2022	Venezia	0	(0)
2021	→ Gorica (loan)	10	(1)
2022	→ Kallithea (loan)	12	(1)
2023–2024	Domžale	14	(1)
2024	Prix-lès-Mézières	3	(0)
2024–2025	Mondorf-les-Bains	22	(10)
2026–	Gefle	0	(0)

International career
2019	Bosnia and Herzegovina U18	2	(0)
2019	Bosnia and Herzegovina U19	9	(0)
2021	Bosnia and Herzegovina U21	1	(0)
- * Club domestic league appearances and goals as of 18 March 2026

Mirza Hasanbegović (born 19 July 2001) is a professional footballer who plays as a forward for Ettan Fotboll club Gefle. Born in Sweden, he represented Bosnia and Herzegovina at youth international level.

== Career ==
Before the second half of the 2019–20 season, Hasanbegović signed for Bulgarian side Lokomotiv Plovdiv, where he made one league appearance.

In 2021, Hasanbegović was sent on loan to Gorica in the Slovenian second division from Italian Serie A club Venezia. On 7 January 2022, he moved on loan to the Greek club Kallithea.
