= Francesco Di Mariano =

Italian footballer

Personal information
- Date of birth: 20 April 1996 (age 30)
- Place of birth: Palermo, Italy
- Height: 1.77 m (5 ft 10 in)
- Positions: Winger; second striker

Team information
- Current team: Padova
- Number: 77

Youth career
- Lecce

Senior career*
Years	Team	Apps	(Gls)
2012–2013	Lecce	2	(0)
2013–2016	Roma	0	(0)
2015	Ancona	10	(1)
2016	Monopoli	18	(3)
2016–2018	Novara	53	(4)
2018–2021	Venezia	78	(10)
2020	→ Juve Stabia (loan)	21	(1)
2021–2022	Lecce	29	(5)
2022–2025	Palermo	74	(5)
2025–2026	Modena	17	(1)
2026–	Padova	15	(1)
- * Club domestic league appearances and goals as of 13 May 2026

Francesco Di Mariano (born 20 April 1996) is an Italian professional footballer who plays as a winger for Serie B club Padova.

== Career ==
Di Mariano started playing football in Palermo, then at the age of 13 he left for Lecce. He made his professional debut with Lecce on 9 September 2012 against Cuneo in the Lega Pro Prima Divisione.

Following spells at Ancona and Monopoli on loan from Roma, Di Mariano joined Novara on 20 July 2016.

On 29 January 2020, he joined Juve Stabia on loan with an obligation to buy. He successively returned to Lecce, being part of the squad that won promotion to Serie A by the end of the 2021–22 Serie B campaign.

On 16 August 2022, Lecce announced Di Mariano had been transferred to his hometown club Palermo, signing a three-year contract for the Rosanero.

After three years with Palermo, on 23 July 2025 Di Mariano left for Modena, signing a two-year deal with the Canarini.

On 31 January 2026, Di Marino moved to Padova on a two-and-a-half-season deal.

== Personal life ==
He is the nephew of Italian former footballer Salvatore Schillaci.
