= Stadio Pier Luigi Penzo =

Multi-use stadium

Coordinates: 45°25′40″N 12°21′49″E

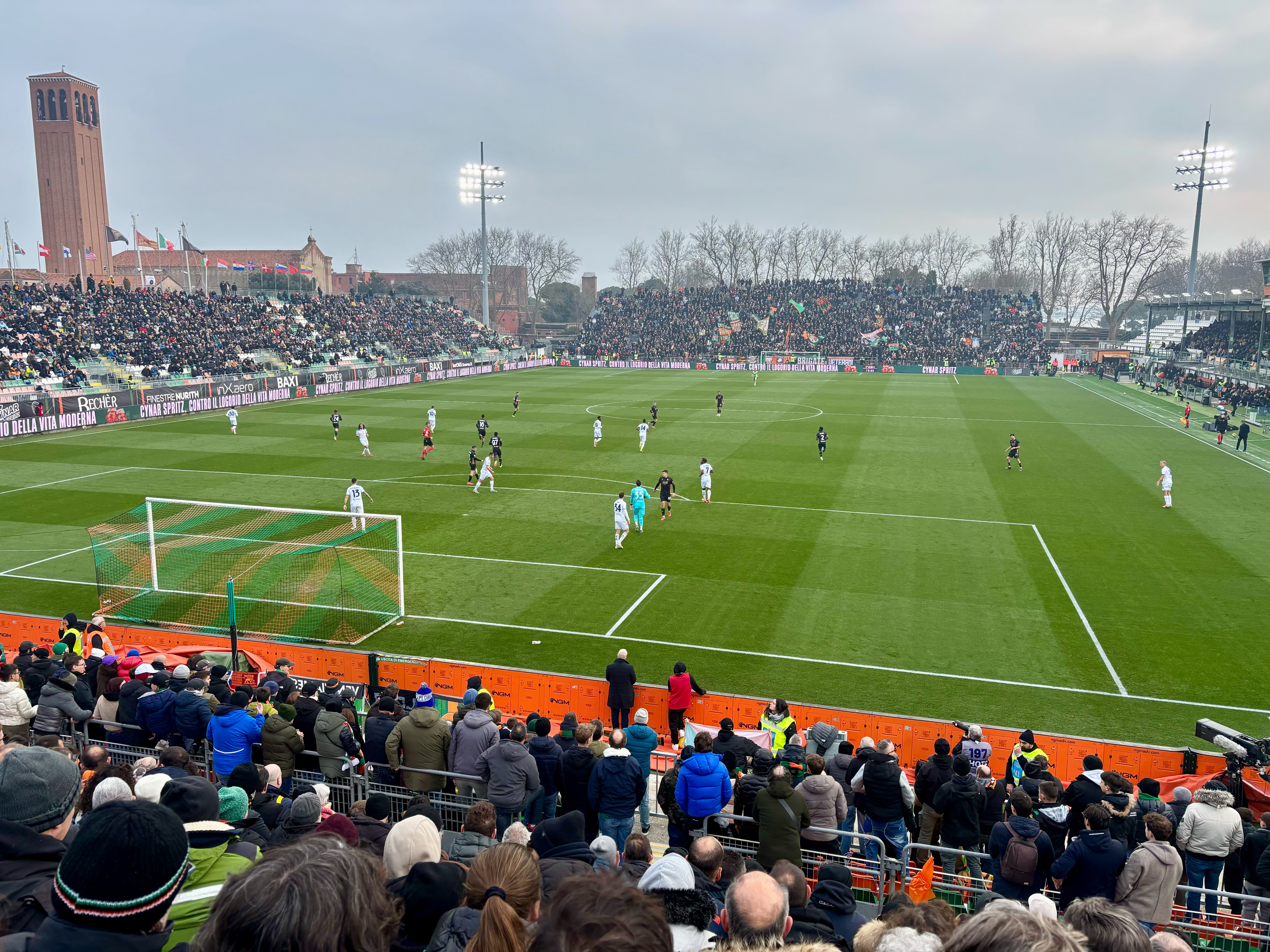
- Interactive map of Stadio Pier Luigi Penzo
- Location: Sant'Elena, Venice, Italy
- Owner: Municipality of Venice
- Capacity: 12,048
- Surface: Grass; 105x68m

Construction
- Opened: 1913
- Renovated: 2021

Tenant
- Venezia FC

Stadio Pier Luigi Penzo is a multi-use stadium in Venice, Italy. It is the largest sports facility in Venice and the home ground of Venezia F.C. The stadium was first opened in 1913 and takes its name from World War I pilot Pier Luigi Penzo (1896–1928). It is the second-oldest continually used stadium in Italy (the oldest being Genoa's Stadio Luigi Ferraris).

== History ==
Originally constructed from wood, the stadium was largely upgraded with a concrete main stand in the 1920s and further improvements were made in the decades that followed. The record attendance of 26,000 was for a football match in 1966, a Serie A match against A.C. Milan.

On 11 September 1970, a tornado hit Venice and caused extensive damage to the stadium. Due to the club's decline the stadium was only partially reinstated, and the capacity was reduced to just over 5,000 and then increased again to 15,000 in 1998. The club's return to the Serie A in 2021 prompted it to begin redevelopment of the stadium over the summer.

Situated on the far eastern edge of Venice, the stadium is notable as it is easily accessible by boat.
