= 2024–25 Venezia FC season =

Venezia
2024–25 season
- Owner: VFC Newco 2020 LLC
- President: Duncan L. Niederauer
- Head coach: Eusebio Di Francesco
- Stadium: Stadio Pier Luigi Penzo
- Serie A: 19th (relegated)
- Coppa Italia: First round
- Top goalscorer: League: Joel Pohjanpalo (6); All: Joel Pohjanpalo (6)
- Highest home attendance: 12,048 vs Internazionale (12 January 2025, Serie A)
- Lowest home attendance: 8,026 vs Como (8 December 2024, Serie A)
- Average home league attendance: 10,150
- Biggest win: 2–0 vs Genoa (H) (21 September 2024, Serie A)
- Biggest defeat: 0–4 vs Milan (A) (14 September 2024, Serie A)
Home colours	Away colours	Third colours

The 2024–25 season was the 118th season in the history of Venezia FC. It was their first season back in the Italian top flight after spending two years in Serie B. In addition to the domestic league, the club participated in the Coppa Italia. On 26 June, Venezia introduced first team coach Eusebio Di Francesco until the end of the 2025–26 season.

Venezia were relegated back to the second division after a loss to Juventus on the final day of a season, in which they failed to secure a single away victory.

== Squad ==
As of 4 February 2025. Note: Flags indicate national team as defined under FIFA eligibility rules; some limited exceptions apply. Players may hold more than one non-FIFA nationality.

No.	Pos.	Nation	Player
1	GK	FIN	Jesse Joronen (3rd captain)
2	DF	GBS	Fali Candé (on loan from Metz)
4	DF	IDN	Jay Idzes (captain)
5	DF	SUR	Ridgeciano Haps
6	MF	USA	Gianluca Busio
7	DF	ITA	Francesco Zampano
9	FW	DEN	Christian Gytkjær
10	FW	ECU	John Yeboah
11	FW	ITA	Gaetano Oristanio
14	MF	ITA	Hans Nicolussi Caviglia (on loan from Juventus)
16	DF	ITA	Alessandro Marcandalli (on loan from Genoa)
17	MF	GUI	Cheick Condé
18	FW	CZE	Daniel Fila
19	MF	ISL	Bjarki Steinn Bjarkason
21	DF	BEL	Richie Sagrado

No.	Pos.	Nation	Player
22	MF	SLO	Domen Črnigoj
23	GK	ITA	Matteo Grandi
24	MF	ITA	Alessio Zerbin (on loan from Napoli)
25	DF	BEL	Joël Schingtienne
28	GK	ROU	Ionuț Radu
30	DF	AUT	Michael Svoboda
32	MF	GHA	Alfred Duncan
33	DF	CRO	Marin Šverko
35	GK	SRB	Filip Stanković (on loan from Inter Milan)
71	MF	ESP	Kike Pérez
77	MF	ISL	Mikael Egill Ellertsson (on loan from Genoa)
79	DF	ARG	Franco Carboni (on loan from Inter Milan)
80	FW	MAR	Saad El Haddad
97	MF	ITA	Issa Doumbia
99	FW	CRO	Mirko Marić (on loan from Monza)

== Transfers ==
=== Summer window ===
==== In ====
Date	Pos.	Player	From	Fee	Notes	Ref.
30 June 2024	MF	(Slovenia) Domen Crnigoj	(Italy) Reggiana	End of loan		
30 June 2024	FW	(United States) Jack de Vries	(Italy) Vis Pesaro	End of loan		
30 June 2024	FW	(Senegal) Babacar Diop	(Italy) Vis Pesaro	End of loan		
30 June 2024	MF	(Italy) Luca Fiordilino	(Italy) Feralpisalò	End of loan		
30 June 2024	DF	(Suriname) Ridgeciano Haps	(Italy) Genoa	End of loan		
30 June 2024	GK	(Italy) Filippo Neri	(Italy) Vis Pesaro	End of loan		
1 July 2024	DF	(Italy) Giorgio Altare	(Italy) Cagliari	€1,000,000	Loan transfer made permanent	
1 July 2024	MF	(Italy) Issa Doumbia	(Italy) AlbinoLeffe	€1,000,000		
5 July 2024	FW	(Italy) Simone Ascione	(Italy) Victoria Marra	Undisclosed	To Primavera squad	
9 July 2024	DF	(France) Noah Baudouin	(Italy) Piacenza	Free		
13 July 2024	MF	(Italy) Gaetano Oristanio	(Italy) Inter Milan	€4,000,000		
26 July 2024	MF	(Ghana) Alfred Duncan	(Italy) Fiorentina	Free		
3 August 2024	MF	(Belgium) Richie Sagrado	(Belgium) OH Leuven	€2,000,000		
28 August 2024	DF	(Belgium) Joël Schingtienne	(Belgium) OH Leuven	€3,000,000		
30 August 2024	FW	(Ecuador) John Yeboah	(Poland) Raków Częstochowa	€2,500,000		
30 August 2024	GK	(Italy) Alessandro Plizzari	(Italy) Pescara	€450,000		

==== Loans in ====
Date	Pos.	Player	From	Fee	Notes	Ref.
1 August 2024	DF	(Italy) Lorenzo Lucchesi	(Italy) Fiorentina	Free		
8 August 2024	FW	(Italy) Antonio Raimondo	(Italy) Bologna	Free		
12 August 2024	GK	(Serbia) Filip Stanković	(Italy) Inter Milan	Free	Option to buy for €2,000,000	
22 August 2024	MF	(Italy) Hans Nicolussi Caviglia	(Italy) Juventus	Free	Obligation to buy for €3,500,000 under certain conditions	
30 August 2024	MF	(Argentina) Franco Carboni	(Italy) Inter Milan	Free	Option to buy for €4,000,000, buy-back option for €12,000,000	

==== Out ====
Date	Pos.	Player	To	Fee	Notes	Ref.
30 June 2024	DF	(Italy) Marco Modolo	Retired			
30 June 2024	MF	(France) Ali Dembélé	(Italy) Torino	End of loan		
30 June 2024	FW	(Italy) Marco Olivieri	(Italy) Juventus Next Gen	End of loan		
1 July 2024	DF	(Austria) Maximilian Ullmann	(Austria) Wolfsberg	Free	End of contract	
1 July 2024	MF	(Russia) Denis Cheryshev	(Greece) Panionos	Free	End of contract	
1 July 2024	MF	(France) Michaël Cuisance	(Germany) Hertha BSC	€300,000		
2 August 2024	DF	(Iceland) Óttar Magnús Karlsson	(Italy) SPAL	Undisclosed		
12 August 2024	FW	(Suriname) Daishawn Redan	(Italy) Avellino	Undisclosed		
27 August 2024	MF	(United States) Tanner Tessmann	(France) Lyon	€6,000,000		
28 August 2024	MF	(Canada) Damiano Pecile	Unattached	Free	Contract terminated by mutual consent	
29 August 2024	MF	(Bosnia and Herzegovina) Mato Jajalo	Unattached	Free	Contract terminated by mutual consent	
30 August 2024	DF	(Italy) Lorenzo Lucchesi	(Italy) Fiorentina	Loan terminated early		
30 August 2024	FW	(Italy) Nicholas Pierini	(Italy) Sassuolo	€2,000,000		
16 September 2024	DF	(France) Noah Baudouin	(France) US Monnaie	Free	Contract terminated by mutual consent	

==== Loans out ====
Date	Pos.	Player	To	Fee	Notes	Ref.
23 July 2024	FW	(United States) Andrija Novakovich	(Italy) Bari	Free	Option to buy for an undisclosed fee, obligation to buy for an undisclosed fee under certain conditions	
29 July 2024	MF	(Italy) Lorenzo Da Pozzo	(Italy) Pianese	Free		
8 August 2024	FW	(Italy) Simone Ascione	(Italy) Foggia	Free		
10 August 2024	DF	(Portugal) Afonso Peixoto	(Italy) Vis Pesaro	Free		
29 August 2024	MF	(Italy) Nunzio Lella	(Italy) Bari	Free	Option to buy for an undisclosed fee	
31 August 2024	GK	(Italy) Alessandro Plizzari	(Italy) Pescara	Free		
10 September 2024	FW	(Netherlands) Jay Enem	(Cyprus) Omonia 29M	Free		

=== Winter window ===
==== In ====
Date	Pos.	Player	From	Fee	Notes	Ref.
31 December 2024	FW	(Iceland) Hilmir Rafn Mikaelsson	(Norway) Kristiansund	End of loan		
8 January 2025	MF	(Guinea) Cheick Condé	(Switzerland) Zürich	€2,000,000		
29 January 2025	MF	(Spain) Kike Pérez	(Spain) Real Valladolid	€1,000,000		
2 February 2025	DF	(Italy) Giovanni Di Renzo	(Italy) Latina	€100,000		
3 February 2025	FW	(Italy) Simone Ascione	(Italy) Foggia	Loan terminated early		
3 February 2025	FW	(Czech Republic) Daniel Fila	(Czech Republic) Slavia Prague	€4,000,000		
3 February 2025	GK	(Romania) Ionuț Radu	(Italy) Inter Milan	Undisclosed		

==== Loans in ====
Date	Pos.	Player	From	Fee	Notes	Ref.
18 January 2025	FW	(Italy) Alessio Zerbin	(Italy) Napoli	Free	Obligation to buy for an undisclosed fee under certain conditions	
22 January 2025	DF	(Guinea-Bissau) Fali Candé	(France) Metz	Free	Option to buy for an undisclosed fee	
29 January 2025	DF	(Italy) Alessandro Marcandalli	(Italy) Genoa	Free	Option to buy for an undisclosed fee	
31 January 2025	MF	(Iceland) Mikael Egill Ellertsson	(Italy) Genoa	Free		
3 February 2025	FW	(Croatia) Mirko Marić	(Italy) Monza	Free		

==== Out ====
Date	Pos.	Player	To	Fee	Notes	Ref.
1 January 2025	GK	(Brazil) Bruno Bertinato	(Brazil) Portuguesa	Undisclosed		
2 January 2025	MF	(Italy) Luca Fiordilino	(Italy) Triestina	Undisclosed		
8 January 2025	FW	(Italy) Antonio Raimondo	(Italy) Bologna	Loan terminated early		
12 January 2025	MF	(Denmark) Magnus Kofod Andersen	(Czech Republic) Sparta Prague	€500,000		
30 January 2025	MF	(Iceland) Mikael Egill Ellertsson	(Italy) Genoa	€3,500,000		
31 January 2025	FW	(Iceland) Hilmir Rafn Mikaelsson	(Norway) Viking	€500,000		
3 February 2025	FW	(Finland) Joel Pohjanpalo	(Italy) Palermo	€4,750,000		

==== Loans out ====
Date	Pos.	Player	To	Fee	Notes	Ref.
9 January 2025	GK	(Italy) Filippo Neri	(Italy) Campobasso	Free		
27 January 2025	DF	(Italy) Giorgio Altare	(Italy) Sampdoria	Free	Until 30 June 2026, obligation to buy under certain conditions	
3 February 2025	DF	(Italy) Antonio Candela	(Spain) Real Valladolid	Free	Option to buy for an undisclosed fee	
3 February 2025	DF	(Italy) Giovanni Di Renzo	(Italy) Vis Pesaro	Free		

== Friendlies ==
=== Pre-season ===
17 July 2024 Friendly	Venezia (Italy)	7–0	(Italy) Real Vicenza	Italy
17:30

20 July 2024 Friendly	Venezia (Italy)	1–3	(Italy) Genoa	Moena
17:00				Stadium: Campo Sportivo Cesare Benatti

25 July 2024 Friendly	Venezia (Italy)	4–1	(Italy) Vis Pesaro	Mestre
17:30				Stadium: Stadio Francesco Baracca

28 July 2024 Friendly	Venezia (Italy)	1–1	(Croatia) Istra 1961	Venice
18:00				Stadium: Stadio Comunale G. Taliercio

1 August 2024 Friendly	FC Utrecht (Netherlands)	1–2	(Italy) Venezia	Utrecht, Netherlands
14:00				Stadium: Stadion Galgenwaard

4 August 2024 Friendly	PEC Zwolle (Netherlands)	1–2	(Italy) Venezia	Netherlands
14:30

=== Mid-season ===
22 March 2025 Friendly	Koper (Slovenia)	4–2	(Italy) Venezia
11:45

== Competitions ==
=== Overall record ===
Competition	First match	Last match	Starting round	Final position	Record							
Competition	First match	Last match	Starting round	Final position	Pld	W	D	L	GF	GA	GD	Win %
Serie A	18 August 2024	25 May 2025	Matchday 1	19th	38	5	14	19	32	56	−24	13.16
Coppa Italia	11 August 2024		Round of 64	Round of 64	1	0	0	1	1	3	−2	0.00
Total					39	5	14	20	33	59	−26	12.82

Source: Soccerway

=== Serie A ===
==== League table ====
Pos	Team	Pld	W	D	L	GF	GA	GD	Pts	Qualification or relegation
16	Parma	38	7	15	16	44	58	−14	36 (Note: Cagliari finished ahead of Parma on head-to-head points: Parma 2–3 Cagliari, Cagliari 2–1 Parma.)	
17	Lecce	38	8	10	20	27	58	−31	34	
18	Empoli (R)	38	6	13	19	33	59	−26	31	Relegation to Serie B
19	Venezia (R)	38	5	14	19	32	56	−24	29	Relegation to Serie B
20	Monza (R)	38	3	9	26	28	69	−41	18	Relegation to Serie B

Source: Serie A
Rules for classification: 1) Points; 2) Tiebreaker for Champions team and third relegated team; 3) Head-to-head points; 4) Head-to-head goal difference; 5) Goal difference; 6) Goals scored; 7) Draw.
(Note: Head-to-head record is used only after all the matches between the teams in question have been played)
(R) Relegated

==== Results summary ====
Overall								Home						Away					
Pld	W	D	L	GF	GA	GD	Pts	W	D	L	GF	GA	GD	W	D	L	GF	GA	GD
38	5	14	19	32	56	−24	29	5	5	9	17	22	−5	0	9	10	15	34	−19

==== Results by round ====
Round	1	2	3	4	5	6	7	8	9	10	11	12	13	14	15	16	17	18	19	20	21	22	23	24	25	26	27	28	29	30	31	32	33
Ground	A	A	H	A	H	A	A	H	A	H	A	H	H	A	H	A	H	A	H	H	A	H	A	H	A	H	A	A	H	H	A	H	
Result	L	D	L	L	W	L	L	L	D	W	L	L	L	L	D	D	W	L	D	L	D	D	L	L	L	D	D	D	D	L	D	W	
Position	17	17	19	20	18	19	20	20	19	18	19	20	20	20	20	20	19	19	19	19	19	19	19	19	19	19	19	19	19	19	19	18	

Updated to match(es) played on 14 April 2025. Source:
A = Away; H = Home; W = Win; D = Draw; L = Loss

==== Matches ====
The match schedule was released on 4 July 2024.

18 August 2024 1	Lazio	3–1	Venezia	Rome
20:45 CEST (UTC+2)	Castellanos 11', (yellow card) 52'; Zaccagni 44' (pen.); Altare 81' (o.g.)	Report	Andersen 3'; Sagrado (yellow card) 32'; Haps (yellow card) 71'	Stadium: Stadio Olimpico; Attendance: 42,000; Referee: Paride Tremolada

25 August 2024 2	Fiorentina	0–0	Venezia	Florence
18:30 CEST (UTC+2)	Mandragora (yellow card) 86'	Report	Oristanio (yellow card) 22'; Zampano (yellow card) 62'	Stadium: Stadio Artemio Franchi; Attendance: 18,915; Referee: Simone Sozza

30 August 2024 3	Venezia	0–1	Torino	Venice
18:30 CEST (UTC+2)	Duncan (yellow card) 68'; Altare (yellow card) 83'	Report	Linetty (yellow card) 49'; Vojvoda (yellow card) 52'; Coco 86'; Lazaro (yellow card) 90+1'; Pedersen (yellow card) 90+4'	Stadium: Stadio Pier Luigi Penzo; Attendance: 10,652; Referee: Matteo Marcenaro

14 September 2024 4	Milan	4–0	Venezia	Milan
20:45 CEST (UTC+2)	Hernandez 2'; Fofana 16'; Pulisic 25' (pen.); Abraham 29' (pen.); Gabbia (yellow card) 38'	Report	Schingtienne (yellow card) 28'; Nicolussi Caviglia (yellow card) 67' (yellow-red card) 73'	Stadium: San Siro; Attendance: 71,273; Referee: Davide Di Marco

21 September 2024 5	Venezia	2–0	Genoa	Venice
15:00 CEST (UTC+2)	Busio 63'; Svoboda (yellow card) 71'; Pohjanpalo 85'; Yeboah (yellow card) 88'	Report	De Winter (yellow card) 30'; Bani (yellow card) 57'; Pinamonti (yellow card) 62'	Stadium: Stadio Pier Luigi Penzo; Referee: Matteo Marchetti

29 September 2024 6	Roma	2–1	Venezia	Rome
15:00 CEST (UTC+2)	Cristante 74', (yellow card) 90'; Pisilli 83'	Report	Idzes (yellow card) 39'; Pohjanpalo 44'; Candela (yellow card) 67'	Stadium: Stadio Olimpico; Attendance: 62,165; Referee: Rosario Abisso

4 October 2024 7	Hellas Verona	2–1	Venezia	Verona
20:45 CEST (UTC+2)	Tengstedt 9'; Bradarić (yellow card) 21'; Duda (yellow card) 76'; Joronen 81' (o.g.); Magnani (yellow card) 90+3'	Report	Oristanio 2'	Stadium: Stadio Marcantonio Bentegodi; Attendance: 25,979; Referee: Marco Guida

20 October 2024 8	Venezia	0–2	Atalanta	Venice
15:00 CEST (UTC+2)	Busio (yellow card) 90+2'	Report	Pašalić 7'; Éderson (yellow card) 43'; Retegui 47'	Stadium: Stadio Pier Luigi Penzo; Attendance: 11,979; Referee: Luca Zufferli

27 October 2024 9	Monza	2–2	Venezia	Monza
15:00	Kyriakopoulos 23'; Đurić 44', (yellow card) 90+4'; Mota (yellow card) 50'; Bondo (yellow card) 76' (yellow-red card) 80'	Report	Ellertsson 15'; Svoboda 39'; Busio (yellow card) 51'; Zampano (yellow card) 76'	Stadium: Stadio Brianteo; Referee: Antonio Rapuano

30 October 2024 10	Venezia	3–2	Udinese	Venice
18:30	Nicolussi Caviglia (yellow card) 11', (goal) 56'; Pohjanpalo 41' (pen.), 86' (pen.); Haps (yellow card) 70'; Oristanio (yellow card) 90+6'	Report	Payero (yellow card) 17'; Lovrić 19'; Bravo 25'; Giannetti (yellow card) 40'; Touré (red card) 53'; Bijol (yellow card) 90+5'; Karlström (yellow card) 90+5'	Stadium: Stadio Pier Luigi Penzo; Referee: Davide Massa

3 November 2024 11	Internazionale	1–0	Venezia	Milan
20:45 CET (UTC+1)	Pavard (yellow card) 31'; L. Martínez 65'; Frattesi (yellow card) 90+8'	Report	Zampano (yellow card) 49'	Stadium: San Siro; Attendance: 66,326; Referee: Maria Sole Ferrieri Caputi

9 November 2024 12	Venezia	1–2	Parma	Venice
15:00 CET (UTC+1)	Nicolussi Caviglia 5'; Kofod (yellow card) 84'	Report	Valeri 17'; Cancellieri (yellow card) 50'; Bonny 68'; Charpentier (yellow card) 90'	Stadium: Stadio Pier Luigi Penzo; Referee: Daniele Chiffi

25 November 2024 13	Venezia	0–1	Lecce	Venice
20:45 CET (UTC+1)	Yeboah (yellow card) 77'	Report	Rafia (yellow card) 2'; Gaspar (yellow card) 45+1'; Guilbert (yellow card) 64'; Dorgu 70'; Sansone (yellow card) 85'	Stadium: Stadio Pier Luigi Penzo; Referee: Luca Pairetto

30 November 2024 14	Bologna FC	3–0	Venezia	Bologna
20:45 CET (UTC+1)	Ndoye 21' (pen.), 71'; Orsolini 69' (pen.)	Report	Šverko (yellow card) 26'; Busio (yellow card) 29'	Stadium: Stadio Renato Dall'Ara; Attendance: 24,866; Referee: Luca Massimi

8 December 2024 15	Venezia	2–2	Como	Venice
18:00 CEST	Nicolussi Caviglia 16'; Oristanio 69'	Report	Candela 49' (o.g.); Belotti 56'	Stadium: Stadio Pier Luigi Penzo; Attendance: 8.026; Referee: Daniele Doveri

14 December 2024 16	Juventus	2–2	Venezia	Turin
20:45 CET (UTC+1)	Gatti 19'; Vlahović 90+5' (pen.), (yellow card) 90+6'	Report	Zampano (yellow card) 47'; Ellertsson 61'; Idzes 83'; Yeboah (yellow card) 90'; Šverko (yellow card) 90+1'	Stadium: Juventus Stadium; Attendance: 38,425; Referee: Antonio Giua

22 December 2024 17	Venezia	2–1	Cagliari	Venice
15:00 CET (UTC+1)	Zampano 38'; Šverko 67'; Idzes (yellow card) 82'	Report	Wieteska (yellow card) 73'; Pavoletti 76', (yellow card) 82'	Stadium: Stadio Pier Luigi Penzo; Attendance: 9,713; Referee: Marco Guida

29 December 2024 18	Napoli	1–0	Venezia	Naples
15:00 CET (UTC+1)	Lukaku (penalty missed) 37'; Raspadori 79'		Altare (yellow card) 31'; Stanković (yellow card) 74'; Idzes (yellow card) 90+5'	Stadium: Stadio Diego Armando Maradona; Attendance: 51,199; Referee: Francesco Cosso

4 January 2025 19	Venezia	1–1	Empoli	Venice
15:00 CET (UTC+1)	Pohjanpalo 5'; Šverko (yellow card) 39'	Report	Esposito 32', (yellow card) 62'; Viti (yellow card) 56'	Stadium: Stadio Pier Luigi Penzo; Attendance: 10,591; Referee: Juan Luca Sacchi

12 January 2025 20	Venezia	0–1	Inter	Venice
15:00 CET (UTC+1)	Oristanio (yellow card) 14'; Zampano (yellow card) 44'; Caviglia (yellow card) 80'	Report	Darmian 16'; Asllani (yellow card) 41'	Stadium: Stadio Pier Luigi Penzo; Attendance: 12,048; Referee: Marco Piccinini

19 January 2025 21	Parma	1–1	Venezia	Parma
15:00 CET (UTC+1)	Keita (yellow card) 18'; Hernani 56' (pen.); Hainaut (yellow card) 87'	Report	Pohjanpalo 20' (pen.); Candela (yellow card) 32'; Bjarkason (yellow card) 74'; Carboni (yellow card) 90+3'	Stadium: Stadio Ennio Tardini; Attendance: 15,865; Referee: Francesco Fourneau

27 January 2025 22	Venezia	1–1	Hellas Verona	Venice
18:30 CET (UTC+1)	Zerbin 28'; Pohjanpalo (yellow card) 45+2'	Report	Kastanos (yellow card) 62'; Tchatchoua 76'	Stadium: Stadio Pier Luigi Penzo; Attendance: 12,048; Referee: Gianluca Manganiello

1 February 2025 23	Udinese	3–2	Venezia	Udine
15:00 CET (UTC+1)	Lucca 47', (yellow card) 90+2'; Kamara (yellow card) 51'; Lovrič 52'; Bijol (yellow card) 75'; Bravo 84'	Report	Haps (yellow card) 50'; Caviglia 64'; Gytkjær 78'; Yeboah (yellow card) 90+1'; Bjarkason (yellow card) 90+2'	Stadium: Bluenergy Stadium; Attendance: 19,767; Referee: Maurizio Mariani

9 February 2025 24	Venezia	0–1	Roma	Venice
12:30 CET (UTC+1)	Fila (yellow card) 10'; Candé (yellow card) 24'	Report	Gourna-Douath (yellow card) 9'; Dybala 57' (pen.); Cristante (yellow card) 61'; Çelik (yellow card) 69'	Stadium: Stadio Pier Luigi Penzo; Attendance: 9,380; Referee: Luca Zufferli

17 February 2025 25	Genoa	2–0	Venezia	Genoa
20:45 CET (UTC+1)	Bani (yellow card) 11'; Pinamonti 82'; Cornet 86'	Report	Kike Pérez (yellow card) 15'	Stadium: Stadio Luigi Ferraris; Attendance: 30,487; Referee: Livio Marinelli

22 February 2025 26	Venezia	0–0	Lazio	Venice
15:00 CET (UTC+1)	Caviglia (yellow card) 75'; Ellertsson (yellow card) 78'; Schingtienne (yellow card) 86'; Condé (yellow card) 90+2'	Report	Guendouzi (yellow card) 47'; Zaccagni (yellow card) 90+4'	Stadium: Stadio Pier Luigi Penzo; Attendance: 8,796; Referee: Matteo Marchetti

1 March 2025 27	Atalanta	0–0	Venezia	Bergamo
15:00 CET (UTC+1)	Lookman (yellow card) 90+2'	Report	Radu (yellow card) 86'; Kike Pérez (yellow card) 90+2'	Stadium: Gewiss Stadium; Attendance: 21,991; Referee: Giuseppe Collu

8 March 2025 28	Como	1–1	Venezia	Como
15:00 CET (UTC+1)	Jack (yellow card) 34'; Ikoné 49'; Douvikas (yellow card) 79'	Report	Zerbin (yellow card) 2'; Duncan (yellow card) 8'; Yeboah (yellow card) 81'; Gytkjær 90+5'	Stadium: Stadio Giuseppe Sinigaglia; Attendance: 10,080; Referee: Giovanni Ayroldi

16 March 2025 29	Venezia	0–0	Napoli	Venice
12:30 CET (UTC+1)	Candé (yellow card) 43'; Caviglia (yellow card) 47'	Report	Olivera (yellow card) 88'	Stadium: Stadio Pier Luigi Penzo; Attendance: 11,440; Referee: Maurizio Mariani

29 March 2025 30	Venezia	0–1	Bologna	Venice
15:00 CET (UTC+1)	Zerbin (yellow card) 22'; Kike Pérez (yellow card) 61'; Condé (yellow card) 78'; Idzes (yellow card) 90+2'	Report	Calabria (yellow card) 25'; Orsolini 49'	Stadium: Stadio Pier Luigi Penzo; Attendance: 9.864; Referee: Marco Di Bello

6 April 2025 31	Lecce	1–1	Venezia	Lecce
12:30 CET (UTC+1)	Baschirotto (yellow card) 64', (goal) 65'; Guilbert (yellow card) 61'	Report	Carboni (yellow card) 39'; Gallo 50' (o.g.); Marcandalli (yellow card) 55'; Pérez (yellow card) 64'; Candé (yellow card) 83'	Stadium: Via del Mare; Attendance: 25.709; Referee: Marco Piccinini

12 April 2025 32	Venezia	1–0	Monza	Venice
15:00	Zerbin (yellow card) 10'; Yeboah (yellow card) 62'; Ellertsson (yellow card) 67'; Fila 72', (yellow card) 82' (yellow-red card) 90+6'	Report	Urbański (yellow card) 27'; Caldirola (yellow card) 68'; Pereira (yellow card) 75'	Stadium: Stadio Pierluigi Penzo; Attendance: 10.001; Referee: Fabio Maresca

20 April 2025 33	Empoli FC	2–2	Venezia	Empoli

27 April 2025 34	Venezia	0–2	AC Milan	Venice

2 May 2025 35	Torino FC	1–1	Venezia	Turin

12 May 2025 36	Venezia	2–1	ACF Fiorentina	Venice

18 May 2025 37	Cagliari Calcio	3–0	Venezia	Cagliari

25 May 2025 38	Venezia	2–3	Juventus FC	Venice

=== Coppa Italia ===
11 August 2024 Round of 64	Brescia	3–1	Venezia	Brescia
18:00	Borrelli 14'; Olzer 46', 82'	Report	Idzes 89'	Stadium: Stadio Mario Rigamonti; Attendance: 4,310; Referee: Maria Sole Ferrieri Caputi
