= 2023–24 Venezia FC season =

Venezia FC
2023–24 season
- Manager: Paolo Vanoli
- Stadium: Stadio Pier Luigi Penzo
- Serie B: 3rd
- Promotion play-offs: Winners
- Coppa Italia: Round of 64
- Top goalscorer: League: Joel Pohjanpalo (18); All: Joel Pohjanpalo (19)
- Biggest win: Venezia 3–0 Como; Bari 0–3 Venezia
- Biggest defeat: Venezia 1–3 Palermo
Home colours	Away colours	Third colours

The 2023–24 season was Venezia FC's 117th season in existence and the club's second consecutive season in the second division of Italian football. The season covers the period from 1 July 2023 to 30 June 2024.

== Players ==
=== First-team squad ===
As of 2 November 2023

Note: Flags indicate national team as defined under FIFA eligibility rules; some limited exceptions apply. Players may hold more than one non-FIFA nationality.

No.	Pos.	Nation	Player
1	GK	FIN	Jesse Joronen (3rd captain)
4	DF	IDN	Jay Idzes
6	MF	USA	Gianluca Busio
7	DF	ITA	Francesco Zampano
8	MF	USA	Tanner Tessmann
9	FW	DEN	Christian Gytkjær
10	FW	ITA	Nicholas Pierini
12	GK	BRA	Bruno Bertinato
13	DF	ITA	Marco Modolo (captain)
15	DF	ITA	Giorgio Altare (on loan from Cagliari)
17	FW	NOR	Dennis Johnsen
18	MF	BIH	Mato Jajalo
19	MF	ISL	Bjarki Steinn Bjarkason
20	FW	FIN	Joel Pohjanpalo (vice-captain)

No.	Pos.	Nation	Player
21	MF	RUS	Denis Cheryshev
23	GK	ITA	Matteo Grandi
24	MF	ITA	Nunzio Lella
25	DF	FRA	Ali Dembélé (on loan from Torino)
27	DF	ITA	Antonio Candela
28	FW	ISL	Hilmir Rafn Mikaelsson
30	DF	AUT	Michael Svoboda
31	DF	AUT	Maximilian Ullmann
33	DF	CRO	Marin Šverko
38	MF	DEN	Magnus Kofod Andersen
60	DF	ITA	Lorenzo Busato
65	MF	SWE	Amin Boudri
77	MF	ISL	Mikael Egill Ellertsson
99	FW	ITA	Marco Olivieri (on loan from Juventus)

=== Out on loan ===
Note: Flags indicate national team as defined under FIFA eligibility rules; some limited exceptions apply. Players may hold more than one non-FIFA nationality.

No.	Pos.	Nation	Player
—	GK	ITA	Filippo Neri (at Vis Pesaro until 30 June 2024)
—	GK	ITA	Tommaso Sperandio (at Treviso until 30 June 2024)
—	DF	SUR	Ridgeciano Haps (at Genoa until 30 June 2024)
—	DF	ISL	Jakob Pálsson (at KR until 31 December 2023)
—	DF	POR	Afonso Peixoto (at Vis Pesaro until 30 June 2024)
—	DF	ARG	Facundo Zabala (at Olimpia until 31 December 2023)
—	MF	SLO	Domen Črnigoj (at Reggiana until 30 June 2024)
—	MF	FRA	Michaël Cuisance (at VfL Osnabrück until 30 June 2024)
—	MF	ITA	Filippo Mozzo (at Mestre until 30 June 2024)
—	MF	USA	Jack de Vries (at Vis Pesaro until 30 June 2024)

No.	Pos.	Nation	Player
—	MF	ITA	Luca Fiordilino (at Feralpisalò until 30 June 2024)
—	MF	ITA	Filippo Mozzo (at Mestre until 30 June 2024)
—	MF	CAN	Damiano Pecile (at KTP until 31 December 2023)
—	FW	ITA	Lorenzo Da Pozzo (at Vis Pesaro until 30 June 2024)
—	FW	SEN	Babacar Diop (at Vis Pesaro until 30 June 2024)
—	FW	NED	Jay Enem (at Ethnikos Achna until 30 June 2024)
—	FW	ISL	Óttar Magnús Karlsson (at Vis Pesaro until 30 June 2024)
—	FW	USA	Andrija Novakovich (at Lecco until 30 June 2024)
—	FW	SUR	Daishawn Redan (at Triestina until 30 June 2024)

== Transfers ==
=== In ===
Pos.	Player	Transferred from	Fee	Date	Source
DF	(Indonesia) Jay Idzes	(Netherlands) Go Ahead Eagles	Free	1 July 2023	
FW	(Denmark) Christian Gytkjær	Unattached	Free	20 July 2023	
FW	(Italy) Marco Olivieri	(Italy) Juventus Next Gen	Loan	18 August 2023	
DF	(Italy) Giorgio Altare	(Italy) Cagliari	Loan	24 August 2023	

== Pre-season and friendlies ==
Win Draw Loss

28 July 2023 Friendly	PEC Zwolle (Netherlands)	1–1	(Italy) Venezia	Zwolle, Netherlands
19:00 CEST (UTC+2)	Druijf 23'	Report	Okoro 109'	Stadium: MAC³PARK Stadion; Referee: Edwin van de Graaf
Note: Match was played in four periods of 30 minutes.

1 August 2023 Friendly	De Treffers (Netherlands)	2–4	(Italy) Venezia	Groesbeek, Netherlands
19:30 CEST (UTC+2)	Thomassen 20'; Maertzdorf 64'	Report	Pohjanpalo 14', 55'; Ellertson 38'; Zampano 46'	Stadium: Sportpark Zuid

4 August 2023 Friendly	NEC Nijmegen (Netherlands)	3–1	(Italy) Venezia	Nijmegen, Netherlands
18:00 CEST (UTC+2)	Ogawa 25'; Mattsson 51', 64'	Report	Tessmann 55'	Stadium: Goffertstadion

18 November 2023 Friendly	Venezia (Italy)	4–0	(Slovenia) Koper	Caorle
15:00 CET (UTC+1)	Olivieri 1'; Gytkjær 21' (pen.); Cheryshev 72'; Lella 86'			Stadium: Stadio Comunale Giovanni Chiggiato

7 January 2024 Friendly	Bayer Leverkusen (Germany)	4–1	(Italy) Venezia	Leverkusen, Germany
15:00 CET (UTC+1)	Hložek 16', 20'; Schick 33'; Hofmann 54'	Report	Ellertsson (yellow card) 28'; Olivieri 78'	Stadium: BayArena; Attendance: 12,796; Referee: Nico Fuchs (Germany)

== Competitions ==
=== Overview ===
Competition	First match	Last match	Starting round	Final position	Record							
Competition	First match	Last match	Starting round	Final position	Pld	W	D	L	GF	GA	GD	Win %
Serie B	20 August 2023	May 2024	Matchday 1	3rd	38	21	7	10	69	46	+23	55.26
Coppa Italia	14 August 2023		Round of 64	Round of 64	1	0	1	0	2	2	+0	0.00
Total					39	21	8	10	71	48	+23	53.85

Source: Soccerway

=== Serie B ===
==== League table ====
Pos	Team	Pld	W	D	L	GF	GA	GD	Pts	Promotion, qualification or relegation
1	Parma (C, P)	38	21	13	4	66	35	+31	76	Promotion to Serie A
2	Como (P)	38	21	10	7	58	40	+18	73	Promotion to Serie A
3	Venezia (O, P)	38	21	7	10	69	46	+23	70	Qualification for promotion play-offs semi-finals
4	Cremonese	38	19	10	9	50	32	+18	67	Qualification for promotion play-offs semi-finals
5	Catanzaro	38	17	9	12	59	50	+9	60	Qualification for promotion play-offs preliminary round

Source: Soccerway (in English)
Rules for classification: 1) Points; 2) Head-to-head points; 3) Head-to-head goal difference; 4) Goal difference; 5) Goals scored; 6) Draw.
(Note: Head-to-head record is used only after all the matches between the teams in question have been played)
(C) Champions; (O) Play-off winners; (P) Promoted

==== Results summary ====
Overall								Home						Away					
Pld	W	D	L	GF	GA	GD	Pts	W	D	L	GF	GA	GD	W	D	L	GF	GA	GD
30	17	6	7	56	35	+21	57	10	3	2	33	20	+13	7	3	5	23	15	+8

==== Results by round ====
Round	1	2	3	4	5	6	7	8	9	10	11	12	13	14	15	16	17	18	19	20	21	22	23	24	25	26	27	28	29	30	31	32	33	34	35	36	37	38
Ground	H	H	A	A	H	A	H	A	H	A	H	A	H	A	H	A	H	H	A	H	A	H	A	A	H	A	H	A	H	A	H	A	H	A	H	A	H	A
Result	W	D	W	D	W	D	L	W	W	L	W	W	W	W	W	L	L	D	D	W	L	W	L	W	D	W	W	L	W	W								
Position	2	4	3	6	4	4	5	3	3	4	3	2	2	2	2	2	2	2	2	2	3	2	2	2	2	2	2	2	2	2								

A = Away; H = Home; W = Win; D = Draw; L = Loss

==== Matches ====
The league fixtures were unveiled on 11 July 2023.

20 August 2023 1	Venezia	3–0	Como	Venice
20:30 CEST (UTC+2)	Pierini 19' 32'; Pohjanpalo 54'	Report		Stadium: Stadio Pier Luigi Penzo; Attendance: 4,894; Referee: (Italy) Ivano Pezzuto

26 August 2023 2	Venezia	1–1	Cosenza	Venice
18:00 CEST (UTC+2)	Pierini 49'; Lella (yellow card) 84'	Report	Voca 38'; Tutino (yellow card) 53'	Stadium: Stadio Pier Luigi Penzo; Attendance: 4,962; Referee: (Italy) Kevin Bonacina

30 August 2023 3	Sampdoria	1–2	Venezia	Genoa
20:30 CEST (UTC+2)	Verre (yellow card) 25'; Estanis Pedrola 46'; La Gumina (yellow card) 73'; Vieira (yellow card) 85'; Panada (yellow card) 90+4'; Stojanović (yellow card) 90+5'	Report	Gytkjær 76'; Tessmann 89'	Stadium: Stadio Luigi Ferraris; Attendance: 21,438; Referee: (Italy) Daniele Minelli

3 September 2023 4	Cittadella	0–0	Venezia	Cittadella
20:45 CEST (UTC+2)	Pittarello (yellow card) 46'; Branca (yellow card) 71'; Frare (yellow card) 74'	Report	Candela (yellow card) 60'; Šverko (yellow card) 89'	Stadium: Stadio Pier Cesare Tombolato; Attendance: 5,283; Referee: (Italy) Marco Monaldi

15 September 2023 5	Venezia	1–0	Spezia	Venice
20:30 CEST (UTC+2)	Zampano (yellow card) 20'; Pohjanpalo 56' (yellow card) 73'	Report	Cassata (yellow card) 62'; Nikolaou (yellow card) 73'; Bertola (yellow card) 85'	Stadium: Stadio Pier Luigi Penzo; Attendance: 5,334; Referee: (Italy) Francesco Forneau

23 September 2023 6	Brescia	0–0	Venezia	Brescia
14:00 CEST (UTC+2)	Farès (yellow card) 31'; Paghera (yellow card) 39'; Bisoli (yellow card) 75'	Report	Tessmann (yellow card) 64'; Zampano (yellow card) 68'	Stadium: Stadio Mario Rigamonti; Referee: (Italy) Luca Zufferli

26 September 2023 7	Venezia	1–3	Palermo	Venice
20:30 CEST (UTC+2)	Busio (yellow card) 12'; Pohjanpalo 45+5'	Report	Brunori 9' (pen.) 62' 90+2'; Lucioni (yellow card) 32'; Gomes (yellow card) 45+7'	Stadium: Stadio Pier Luigi Penzo; Attendance: 6,748; Referee: (Italy) Niccoló Baroni

30 September 2023 8	Modena	1–3	Venezia	Modena
14:00 CEST (UTC+2)	Gerli (yellow card) 30'; Bonfanti 48'; Oukhadda (yellow card) 57'	Report	Altare 55' (yellow card) 85'; Zampano (yellow card) 57'; Gytkjær 76'; Bjarkason 83'	Stadium: Stadio Alberto Braglia; Attendance: 9,151; Referee: (Italy) Paride Tremolada

7 October 2023 9	Venezia	3–2	Parma	Venice
16:15 CEST (UTC+2)	Busio 46'; Tessmann 63'; Ellertsson 78'	Report	Hernani (yellow card) 35'; Di Chiara (yellow card) 36'; Benedyczak 54' (pen.); Čolak 90+3'	Stadium: Stadio Pier Luigi Penzo; Attendance: 9,360; Referee: (Italy) Daniele Minelli

22 October 2023 10	Reggiana	1–0	Venezia	Reggio Emilia
18:30 CEST (UTC+2)	Portanova (yellow card) 24'; Cigarini (yellow card) 41'; Gondo 47'; Črnigoj (yellow card) 64'	Report	Zampano (yellow card) 51' (yellow-red card) 62'; Ellertsson (yellow card) 66'; Altare (yellow card) 76'; Tessmann (yellow card) 88'	Stadium: Mapei Stadium – Città del Tricolore; Attendance: 8,791; Referee: (Italy) Daniele Rutella

29 October 2023 11	Venezia	2–1	Pisa	Venice
16:15 CEST (UTC+2)	Bruno (yellow card) 3'; Pierini 31'; Johnsen 74'; Ali Dembélé (yellow card) 80'	Report	Valoti 6' (pen.); Leverbe (yellow card) 8'; Barbieri (yellow card) 17'; Hermannsson (yellow card) 50'; Moreo (yellow card) 90+3'	Stadium: Stadio Pier Luigi Penzo; Attendance: 6,990; Referee: (Italy) Davide Ghersini

4 November 2023 12	Ternana	0–1	Venezia	Terni
14:00 CET (UTC+1)		Report	Busio (yellow card) 43' (goal) 74'; Johnsen (yellow card) 90+3'	Stadium: Stadio Libero Liberati; Attendance: 3,838; Referee: (Italy) Maurizio Mariani

10 November 2023 13	Venezia	2–1	Catanzaro	Venice
20:30 CET (UTC+1)	Pohjanpalo 25' (pen.); Johnsen 45+1'; Altare (yellow card) 58'; Bjarkason (red card) 89'; Gytkjær (yellow card) 90+1'	Report	Šitum (yellow card) 5'; Ghion 40'	Stadium: Stadio Pier Luigi Penzo; Attendance: 7,765; Referee: (Italy) Alberto Santoro

25 November 2023 14	Bari	0–3	Venezia	Bari
14:00 CET (UTC+1)	Ahmad Benali (yellow card) 53'; Nasti (yellow card) 67'; Maita (yellow card) 80'	Report	Pierini 30'; Tessmann 90'; Ali Dembélé 90+7'	Stadium: Stadio San Nicola; Attendance: 16,458; Referee: (Italy) Giuseppe Collu

2 December 2023 15	Venezia	3–1	Ascoli	Venice
14:00 CET (UTC+1)	Gytkjær 26' 89'; Altare 30' (yellow card) 59'	Report	Di Tacchio (yellow card) 41'; Masini 47'; Falasco (yellow card) 57'; Millico (yellow card) 90+2'	Stadium: Stadio Pier Luigi Penzo; Attendance: 5,660; Referee: (Italy) Giovanni Ayroldi

9 December 2023 16	Cremonese	1–0	Venezia	Cremona
14:00 CET (UTC+1)	Majer (yellow card) 34'; Antov (red card) 51'; Ravanelli 80'; Castagnetti (yellow card) 85'; Pickel (yellow card) 90'; Bianchetti (yellow card) 90+4'	Report	Altare (yellow card) 36'; Ali Dembélé (yellow card) 90'	Stadium: Stadio Giovanni Zini; Attendance: 8,286; Referee: (Italy) Antonio Giua

16 December 2023 17	Venezia	2–3	Südtirol	Venice
14:00 CET (UTC+1)	Gytkjær 13' 45+5' (pen.); Johnsen (yellow card) 85'; Olivieri (yellow card) 90+1' (yellow-red card) 90+1'	Report	Rauti 9'; Silvio Merkaj 52' (yellow card) 55'; Casiraghi 76' (pen.); Andrea Giorgini (yellow card) 85'; Davì (yellow card) 89'	Stadium: Stadio Pier Luigi Penzo; Attendance: 4,988; Referee: (Italy) Paride Tremolada

23 December 2023 18	Venezia	2–2	Lecco	Venice
14:00 CET (UTC+1)	Johnsen (yellow card) 42' (goal) 57'; Tessmann 60' (yellow card) 90+4'	Report	Lepore 21' (pen.); Mats Lemmens (yellow card) 63' (yellow-red card) 90+6'; Ioniță 71'; Eusepi (yellow card) 87'	Stadium: Stadio Pier Luigi Penzo; Attendance: 5,976; Referee: (Italy) Francesco Cosso

26 December 2023 19	Feralpisalò	2–2	Venezia	Piacenza
15:00 CET (UTC+1)	Compagnon 38' 54'; Kourfalidis (yellow card) 47'; Zennaro (yellow card) 65'	Report	Candela (yellow card) 37'; Pohjanpalo 45+2' (pen.); Altare 75'; Cheryshev (yellow card) 87'	Stadium: Stadio Leonardo Garilli; Attendance: 1,351; Referee: (Italy) Alberto Santoro

14 January 2024 20	Venezia	5–3	Sampdoria	Venice
16:15 CET (UTC+1)	Lella (yellow card) 3'; Pohjanpalo 16', 36', 58'; Šverko (yellow card) 48'; Johnsen (yellow card) 68'; Busio 74'; Ellertsson 77'	Report	Benedetti 30', (yellow card) 41' (yellow-red card) 44'; Verre (yellow card) 43'; De Luca 65'; Depaoli 71'	Stadium: Stadio Pier Luigi Penzo; Attendance: 9,030; Referee: Federico Dionisi

20 January 2024 21	Cosenza	4–2	Venezia	Cosenza
16:15 CET (UTC+1)				Stadium: Stadio San Vito-Gigi Marulla

27 January 2024 22	Venezia	1–0	Ternana	Venice
14:00 CET (UTC+1)				Stadium: Stadio Pier Luigi Penzo

26 April 2024 35	Venezia	2–1	Cremonese	Venice
20:30		Report		Stadium: Stadio Pier Luigi Penzo; Referee: Livio Marinelli

5 May 2024 37	Venezia	2–1	Feralpisalò	Venice
15:00	Pohjanpalo 60', 90+3'		Compagnon 83'	Stadium: Stadio Pier Luigi Penzo

10 May 2024 38	Spezia	2–1	Venezia	La Spezia
20:30	Esposito 56'; Reca 61'		Idzes 17'	Stadium: Stadio Alberto Picco

==== Promotion play-offs ====
20 May 2024 Semi-finals; First leg	Palermo	0–1	Venezia	Palermo
20:30 CEST (UTC+2)		Report	Pierini 62'	Stadium: Renzo Barbera; Referee: Antonio Giua

24 May 2024 Semi-finals; Second leg	Venezia	2–1 (3–1 agg.)	Palermo	Venice
20:30 CEST (UTC+2)	Tessmann 4'; Candela 43'	Report	Svoboda 86' (o.g.)	Stadium: Stadio Pier Luigi Penzo; Referee: Luca Pairetto

=== Coppa Italia ===
14 August 2023 Round of 64	Spezia	2–2 (4–3 p)	Venezia	Cesena
21:00 CEST (UTC+2)	Antonucci 19'; Moro 60' (pen.); Nikolaou (yellow card) 98'	Report	Idzes (yellow card) 26'; Pohjanpalo 54'; Šverko (yellow card) 62'; Gytkjær 81' (pen.)	Stadium: Stadio Dino Manuzzi; Attendance: 626; Referee: (Italy) Niccolò Baroni
