= Saad El Haddad =

Moroccan footballer (born 2005)

Personal information
- Date of birth: 24 July 2005 (age 21)
- Place of birth: Italy
- Height: 1.75 m (5 ft 9 in)
- Positions: Winger; striker

Team information
- Current team: NK Rudeš (on loan from Venezia)
- Number: 88

Youth career
- –2021: ChievoVerona
- 2021–2023: Monza
- 2023–2024: Venezia

Senior career*
Years	Team	Apps	(Gls)
2024–	Venezia	3	(0)
2026	→ Pineto (loan)	9	(1)
2026–	→ NK Rudeš (loan)	0	(0)

International career^{‡}
2024–2025	Morocco U20	24	(7)
Medal record
Men's football
Representing Morocco
FIFA U-20 World Cup
Winner	2025 Chile
- * Club domestic league appearances and goals as of 30 April 2026 ‡ National team caps and goals as of 20 October 2025

Saad El Haddad (Arabic: سَعْد الْحَدَّاد, Arabic pronunciation: [sˤaʕd alħadˈdaːd]; born 24 July 2005) is a professional footballer who plays as a winger or a striker for Croatian Football League club NK Rudeš, on loan from Serie A club Venezia. Born in Italy, he is a Morocco youth international.

== Club career ==
El Haddad played in the youth academy of ChievoVerona, before joining Monza in 2021. Throughout the 2022–23 season, he scored nine goals and four assists in 27 appearances for Monza's under-18 team, before featuring with the under-19 squad in the Campionato Primavera 2 and the Coppa Italia Primavera.

On 1 August 2023, El Haddad joined Venezia on a permanent deal, being subsequently assigned to their under-19 team. During the 2023–24 league campaign, the winger made 31 appearances for the side, scoring 13 goals in the process.

On 27 June 2024, El Haddad signed his first professional contract with Venezia, penning a three-year deal; he then started training with the first team, under head coach Eusebio Di Francesco, during the pre-season. On 11 August, he made his professional debut for the club, coming on as a substitute for Issa Doumbia in the second half of a Coppa Italia match against Brescia; in the occasion, he served an assist to Jay Idzes, as the game ended in a 3–1 loss for his side.

On 2 February 2026, El Haddad was loaned to Serie C club Pineto.

== International career ==
El Haddad is eligible to represent either Italy or Morocco at international level.

In February 2024, he received a call-up by manager Zakaria Aboub to take part in a training camp with the Morocco under-20 national team at the Mohammed VI Football Complex in Salé. In May 2024, he was called up again for two friendly matches against the DR Congo; he went on to make his debut for the Atlas Lions on 22 May, starting in a 2–0 win over the DRC.

El Haddad represented Morocco at the 2025 FIFA U-20 World Cup, which Morocco won, and El Haddad appeared in every game, including the final against Argentina.

== Career statistics ==
As of match played 29 December 2024

Appearances and goals by club, season and competition
Club	Season	League			Coppa Italia		Total	
Club	Season	Division	Apps	Goals	Apps	Goals	Apps	Goals
Venezia	2024–25	Serie A	3	0	1	0	4	0
Career total			3	0	1	0	4	0

== Honours ==
Morocco U20

- FIFA U-20 World Cup: 2025
