= Christian Gytkjær =

Danish footballer (born 1990)

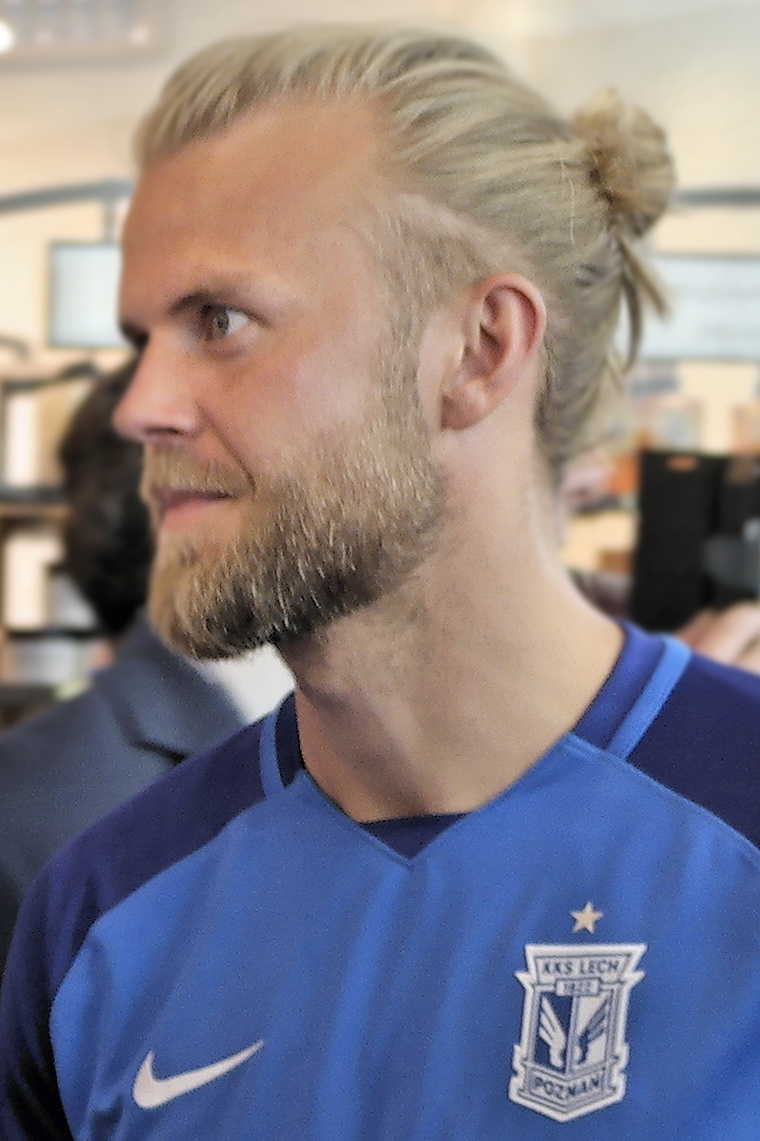
- Gytkjær with Lech Poznań in 2017

Personal information
- Full name: Christian Lund Gytkjær
- Date of birth: 6 May 1990 (age 36)
- Place of birth: Roskilde, Denmark
- Height: 1.85 m (6 ft 1 in)
- Position: Striker

Youth career
- Roskilde
- Jyllinge FC
- 2005–2008: Lyngby

Senior career*
Years	Team	Apps	(Gls)
2008–2010	Lyngby	34	(10)
2010–2013	Nordsjælland	24	(3)
2012	→ Akademisk Boldklub (loan)	12	(6)
2012	→ Sandnes Ulf (loan)	12	(8)
2013–2016	Haugesund	81	(36)
2016–2017	Rosenborg	28	(19)
2017	1860 Munich	15	(2)
2017–2020	Lech Poznań	102	(55)
2020–2023	Monza	77	(16)
2023–2025	Venezia	67	(13)
2025–2026	Bari	25	(3)

International career
2006	Denmark U16	1	(0)
2006	Denmark U17	6	(4)
2007–2008	Denmark U18	3	(0)
2008–2009	Denmark U19	10	(2)
2009–2011	Denmark U20	5	(2)
2011	Denmark U20	1	(0)
2016–2019	Denmark	9	(5)
- * Club domestic league appearances and goals as of 12 May 2026

Christian Lund Gytkjær (Danish pronunciation: [ˈkytˌkʰeˀɐ̯]; born 6 May 1990) is a Danish professional footballer who plays as a striker.

== Early life ==
Christian Gytkjær started his youth career playing for Roskilde, before moving on to Lyngby in 2005. In October 2007, he was invited for a trial at Liverpool in England with his brother, Frederik, ultimately nothing materialized from the visit. Gytkjær went on to be Lyngby's top scorer in 2007–08 for the under-18 side.

== Club career ==
=== Lyngby Boldklub ===
Gytkjær was called up to the Lyngby first team in the middle of 2008, signing a new contract keeping him at the club until 2010. He scored three goals in eight appearances in his debut season in the 1st Division. By the 2009–10 campaign, Gytkjær had become one of Lyngby's most anticipated talents to come through their youth system.

On 2 February 2010, it was confirmed Gytkjær would leave Lyngby when his contract expired in the summer to join Danish Cup winners Nordsjælland on a free transfer, signing a three-year contract, following in the footsteps of Andreas Bjelland, Andreas Laudrup and Morten Nordstrand, who had left Lyngby for the Farum-based club. While his future had been set, Gytkjær was still to play out the remainder of the 2009–10 season with Lyngby, where he was targeted by the supporters who disapproved in seeing another player their team had nurtured head over to neighboring rivals. The backlash was only increased when the player was photographed with an FCN shirt while still under contract to Lyngby.

=== Nordsjælland ===
Gytkjær made his debut for Nordsjælland in a 2–0 away defeat to Superliga champions Copenhagen on 14 August 2010, when he was brought into the team to replace Nicki Bille Nielsen, who was sold to Villarreal. In 2012, he was loaned out to Akademisk Boldklub (AB) and Sandnes Ulf.

=== Haugesund ===
On 23 January 2013, Gytkjær joined Norwegian side Haugesund by signing a four-year contract.

=== Rosenborg ===
On 6 January 2016, Gytkjær signed for fellow Norwegian club Rosenborg on a three-year deal. In his debut season, he achieved the domestic double, and became the league's top scorer with 19 goals.

=== 1860 Munich ===
On 27 January 2017, Gytkjær joined German club 1860 Munich by signing a contract until 2019.

=== Lech Poznań ===
On 28 June 2017, Gytkjær signed a two-year contract with Ekstraklasa side Lech Poznań, with the option for an extra 12 months. He made his debut for the club during the 2017–18 UEFA Europa League second qualifying round away game against FK Haugesund, which Lech lost 3–2. He scored his first two goals for Lech in a 5–1 home win over Piast Gliwice in the third round of the 2017–18 season.

On 7 March 2019, Gytkjær signed a contract extension, running until the end of the 2019–20 season. On 19 July 2020, in his last game for Lech, Gytkjær scored twice in a 4–0 home win against Jagiellonia Białystok and led the team to secure second place in the 2019–20 season. He finished the campaign as the top scorer with 24 goals, and won the Ekstraklasa Forward of the Season award.

In total, Gytkjær scored 65 goals for Lech in 119 appearances, which made him the all-time highest foreign goalscorer in the club's history, until his tally was surpassed by Mikael Ishak in 2024.

=== Monza ===
On 22 July 2020, Gytkjær joined newly promoted Serie B side Monza on a free transfer, signing a two-year contract with the option of a third. He made his debut on 3 October against Empoli, and scored his first goal on 31 October, converting a penalty kick against Cittadella. He renewed his expiring contract in February 2022 for one year.

With five goals in four 2021–22 Serie B promotion play-off games – including three goals in two final games against Pisa – Gytkjær helped Monza gain promotion to the Serie A for the first time in their history, and was awarded the play-off MVP award. He made his Serie A debut on 13 August 2022, as a substitute in a 2–1 home defeat to Torino. On 18 September, Gytkjær came on as a substitute and scored in an upset 1–0 win against Italian giants Juventus; it was Monza's first-ever Serie A win.

=== Venezia ===
On 20 July 2023, Gytkjær joined Italian side Venezia as a free agent for two seasons. On 2 June 2024, he scored the only goal in a 1–0 victory over Cremonese in the promotion playoffs final, securing his club's promotion to Serie A.

=== Bari ===
On 12 July 2025, Gytkjær signed a one-season contract with Bari.

== International career ==
Gytkjær was part of the Denmark under-17 team that won the 2006 Nordic Championship in the Faroe Islands. He scored three goals in a 4–0 win over England in the final.

== Personal life ==
Gytkjær's younger brother, Frederik, also is a footballer.

== Career statistics ==
=== Club ===
As of match played 25 May 2025

Appearances and goals by club, season and competition
Club	Season	League			National cup (Note: Includes the Danish Cup, Norwegian Football Cup, DFB-Pokal, Polish Cup)		Continental		Other		Total	
Club	Season	Division	Apps	Goals	Apps	Goals	Apps	Goals	Apps	Goals	Apps	Goals
Lyngby	2008–09	Danish 1st Division	8	3	0	0	—		—		8	3
Lyngby	2009–10	Danish 1st Division	26	7	2	0	—		—		28	7
Lyngby	Total		34	10	2	0	0	0	0	0	36	10
Nordsjælland	2010–11	Danish Superliga	19	3	2	0	0	0	—		21	3
Nordsjælland	2011–12	Danish Superliga	5	0	1	1	—		—		6	1
Nordsjælland	2012–13	Danish Superliga	2	1	—		—		—		2	1
Nordsjælland	Total		26	4	3	1	0	0	0	0	29	5
Akademisk Boldklub (loan)	2011–12	Danish 1st Division	12	6	0	0	—		—		12	6
Sandnes Ulf (loan)	2012	Tippeligaen	12	8	0	0	—		2 (Note: Appearances in Tippeligaen relegation play-offs)	3	14	11
Haugesund	2013	Tippeligaen	25	11	3	4	—		—		28	15
Haugesund	2014	Tippeligaen	26	15	3	1	2 (Note: Appearances in UEFA Europa League)	0	—		31	16
Haugesund	2015	Tippeligaen	30	10	2	3	—		—		32	13
Haugesund	Total		81	36	8	8	2	0	0	0	91	44
Rosenborg	2016	Tippeligaen	28	19	5	1	6 (Note: Four appearances two goals in UEFA Champions League, two appearances one goal in UEFA Europa League)	3	—		39	23
1860 Munich	2016–17	2. Bundesliga	15	2	1	0	—		2 (Note: Appearances in 2. Bundesliga promotion play-offs)	0	18	2
Lech Poznań	2017–18	Ekstraklasa	37	19	1	0	4	2	—		42	21
Lech Poznań	2018–19	Ekstraklasa	31	12	2	0	6	5	—		39	17
Lech Poznań	2019–20	Ekstraklasa	34	24	4	3	—		—		38	27
Lech Poznań	Total		102	55	7	3	10	7	0	0	119	65
Monza	2020–21	Serie B	22	6	1	0	—		1 (Note: Appearance(s) in Serie B promotion play-offs)	0	24	6
Monza	2021–22	Serie B	33	9	1	0	—		4	5	38	14
Monza	2022–23	Serie A	22	1	1	1	—		—		23	2
Monza	Total		77	16	3	1	0	0	5	5	85	22
Venezia	2023–24	Serie B	38	11	1	1	—		4	1	43	13
Venezia	2024–25	Serie A	29	2	1	0	—		—		30	2
Venezia	Total		67	13	2	1	—		4	1	73	15
Career total			454	169	31	15	18	10	13	9	516	201

=== International ===
As of match played 15 November 2019

Appearances and goals by national team and year
National team	Year	Apps	Goals
Denmark	2016	1	0
Denmark	2018	2	0
Denmark	2019	6	5
Total		9	5

Scores and results list Denmark's goal tally first, score column indicates score after each Gytkjær goal.

List of international goals scored by Christian Gytkjær
No.	Date	Venue	Opponent	Score	Result	Competition	Ref.
1	26 March 2019	St. Jakob-Park, Basel, Switzerland	Switzerland	2–3	3–3	UEFA Euro 2020 qualification	
2	5 September 2019	Victoria Stadium, Gibraltar	Gibraltar	5–0	6–0	UEFA Euro 2020 qualification	
3	5 September 2019	Victoria Stadium, Gibraltar	Gibraltar	6–0	6–0	UEFA Euro 2020 qualification	
4	15 October 2019	Aalborg Stadium, Aalborg, Denmark	Luxembourg	4–0	4–0	Friendly	
5	15 November 2019	Parken Stadium, Copenhagen, Denmark	Gibraltar	2–0	6–0	UEFA Euro 2020 qualification	

== Honours ==
Nordsjælland

- Danish Cup: 2010–11

Rosenborg

- Tippeligaen: 2016
- Norwegian Cup: 2016

Venezia

- Serie B Promotion play-offs: 2023–24

Denmark U17

- Nordic Championship: 2006

Individual

- Tippeligaen top scorer: 2016
- Ekstraklasa top scorer: 2019–20
- Tippeligaen Striker of the Year: 2016
- Ekstraklasa Forward of the Season: 2019–20
- Ekstraklasa Player of the Month: March 2018, July 2020
- Serie B play-offs MVP: 2021–22
