= Giorgio Altare =

Italian footballer (born 1998)

Personal information
- Date of birth: 9 August 1998 (age 28)
- Place of birth: Bergamo, Italy
- Height: 1.90 m (6 ft 3 in)
- Position: Defender

Team information
- Current team: Pescara
- Number: 15

Youth career
- 2004–2010: Valle Imagna
- 2010–2012: Ponte San Pietro
- 2012–2017: AC Milan
- 2017–2018: Genoa

Senior career*
Years	Team	Apps	(Gls)
2016–2017	AC Milan	0	(0)
2016	→ Alzano Seriate (loan)	8	(0)
2018–2021	Genoa	0	(0)
2018–2020	→ Feralpisalò (loan)	2	(0)
2020–2021	→ Olbia (loan)	43	(3)
2021–2024	Cagliari	45	(2)
2023–2024	→ Venezia (loan)	32	(4)
2024–2026	Venezia	12	(0)
2025–2026	→ Sampdoria (loan)	14	(0)
2026	→ Pescara (loan)	6	(0)
2026–	Pescara	0	(0)
- * Club domestic league appearances and goals as of 22 August 2026

Giorgio Altare (born 9 August 1998) is an Italian professional footballer who plays as a defender for Serie C Group B club Pescara.

== Career ==
=== AC Milan ===
Altare is a product of the AC Milan youth system. He spent the second half of the 2015–16 season on loan at Serie D club Alzano Seriate. Late in the 2016–17 Serie A season, Altare was called up to the senior squad for one game, but remained on the bench.

=== Genoa ===
After joining Genoa in the summer of 2017, he spent the 2017–18 season playing for the club's Primavera (Under-19 squad). Altare did not receive any call-ups to the senior squad during that season.

==== Loan to Feralpisalò ====
On 20 July 2018, he joined Serie C club Feralpisalò on a season-long loan. In September, he suffered an ACL rupture and the recovery took most of the rest of the 2018–19 season.

Altare made his professional Serie C debut for Feralpisalò on 5 May 2019, in a game against Pordenone. He replaced Paolo Marchi in the 72nd minute. Altare made his first starting line-up appearance on 29 May 2019, against Triestina. He finished the season with five appearances, one of which as a starter).

On 11 July 2019, the loan was extended for the 2019–20 season. He made one league appearance (as a starter) and one Coppa Italia appearance for Feralpisalò in the 2019–20 season.

==== Loan to Olbia ====
On 16 January 2020, Altare joined Olbia in Serie C on loan. The loan was renewed for the 2020–21 season on 26 August 2020.

=== Cagliari ===
On 18 July 2021, he signed a four-year contract with Cagliari. On 1 October 2021, Altare made his Serie A debut for Cagliari, in a 1–1 home draw with Venezia.

==== Loan to Venezia ====
On 24 August 2023, he joined Venezia on loan with an option to buy and a conditional obligation to buy.

=== Venezia ===
==== Loan to Sampdoria ====
On 27 January 2025, Altare moved on loan to Sampdoria until 30 June 2026, with an option to buy and a conditional obligation to buy. He signed a contract with Sampdoria until 30 June 2028, that would have been in place if the transfer was made permanent after the loan expired. Altare suffered an ACL tear in the summer of 2025 and did not appear for Sampdoria in the 2025–26 season.

==== Loan to Pescara ====
On 2 February 2026, he returned from Sampdoria and joined Pescara on a new loan.

== Career statistics ==
As of match played 6 April 2025

Appearances and goals by club, season and competition
Club	Season	League			National cup (Note: Includes Coppa Italia, Coppa Italia Serie C)		Europe		Other		Total	
Club	Season	Division	Apps	Goals	Apps	Goals	Apps	Goals	Apps	Goals	Apps	Goals
Virtus Bergamo (loan)	2015–16	Serie D	8	0	0	0	—		—		8	0
Feralpisalò (loan)	2018–19	Serie C	1	0	2	0	—		4 (Note: Appearances in Serie C-Promotion play-offs)	0	7	0
Feralpisalò (loan)	2019–20	Serie C	1	0	4	0	—		—		5	0
Feralpisalò (loan)	Total		2	0	6	0	—		4	0	12	0
Olbia (loan)	2019–20	Serie C	6	1	0	0	—		2 (Note: Appearances in Serie C-Relegation play-offs)	0	8	1
Olbia (loan)	2020–21	Serie C	37	2	0	0	—		—		37	2
Olbia (loan)	Total		43	3	0	0	—		2	0	45	3
Cagliari	2021–22	Serie A	19	1	3	0	—		—		22	1
Cagliari	2022–23	Serie B	26	1	1	1	—		4 (Note: Appearances in Serie B – Promotion play-offs)	0	31	2
Cagliari	2023–24	Serie A	0	0	0	0	—		—		0	2
Cagliari	Total		45	2	4	1	—		4	0	53	3
Venezia (loan)	2023–24	Serie B	32	0	0	0	—		3	0	35	0
Venezia	2024–25	Serie A	12	0	0	0	—		—		12	0
Venezia	Total		44	0	0	0	—		3	0	47	0
Sampdoria (loan)	2024–25	Serie B	8	0	—		—		—		8	0
Career total			150	5	10	1	—		13	0	173	6
