= Joel Pohjanpalo =

Finnish footballer (born 1994)

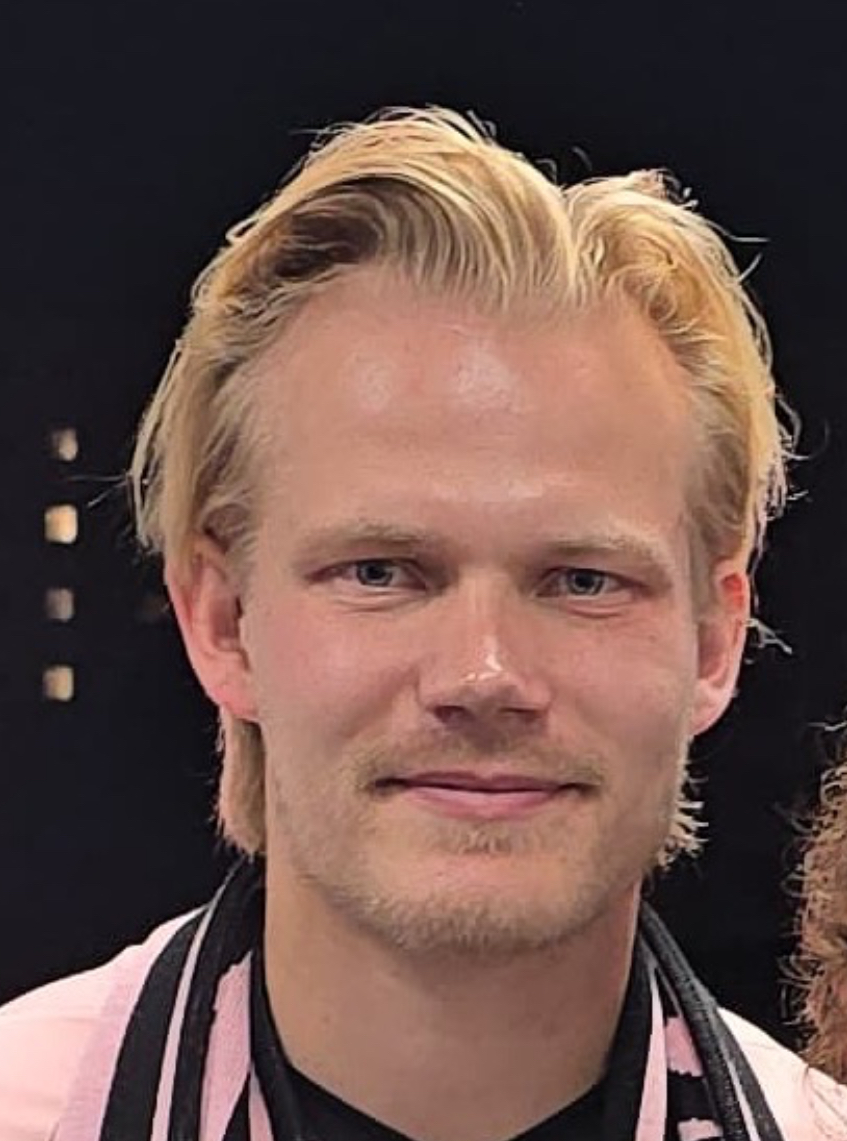
- Pohjanpalo with Palermo in 2025

Personal information
- Full name: Joel Julius Ilmari Pohjanpalo
- Date of birth: 13 September 1994 (age 32)
- Place of birth: Helsinki, Finland
- Height: 1.86 m (6 ft 1 in)
- Position: Forward

Team information
- Current team: Palermo
- Number: 20

Youth career
- 1999–2005: PK-35
- 2006–2010: HJK

Senior career*
Years	Team	Apps	(Gls)
2010–2011	Klubi 04	26	(33)
2011–2016	HJK	50	(16)
2013–2014	→ VfR Aalen (loan)	22	(5)
2014–2016	→ Fortuna Düsseldorf (loan)	55	(13)
2016–2022	Bayer Leverkusen	23	(7)
2020	→ Hamburger SV (loan)	14	(9)
2020–2021	→ Union Berlin (loan)	19	(6)
2021–2022	→ Çaykur Rizespor (loan)	33	(16)
2022–2025	Venezia	90	(47)
2025–	Palermo	55	(34)

International career^{‡}
2009	Finland U15	4	(0)
2010	Finland U16	13	(2)
2011	Finland U17	1	(0)
2011	Finland U18	10	(4)
2012	Finland U19	3	(1)
2012–2015	Finland U21	11	(2)
2012–	Finland	95	(24)
Medal record
Men's football
Representing Finland
Baltic Cup
Third place	2014 Latvia
- * Club domestic league appearances and goals as of 7 September 2026 ‡ National team caps and goals as of 15 November 2026

Joel Julius Ilmari Pohjanpalo (born 13 September 1994) is a Finnish professional footballer who plays as a forward for Serie B club Palermo and the Finland national team. He is known for his strong heading and finishing ability.

Pohjanpalo began his career with HJK, making his Veikkausliiga debut in October 2011 at the age of 17; he moved out to Germany at age nineteen in 2013. After multiple successful loan spells in Germany and Turkey, Pohjanpalo left Bayer Leverkusen in 2022 after a six-year spell and was acquired by Italian side Venezia, where he quickly became a fan favourite cult player, and as the team captain, helped Venezia promote to Serie A in 2024. After two-and-a-half seasons with Venezia, Pohjanpalo was acquired by Palermo in February 2025 for around €5 million.

Pohjanpalo made his full international debut for Finland in November 2012 at the age of eighteen, and has since made over 80 appearances, including playing in matches for 2018 and 2022 FIFA World Cup qualification, and in the UEFA Euro 2020 final tournament.

== Club career ==
Born in Helsinki, Finland, Pohjanpalo started football in a youth team of a Helsinki-based club PK-35 in 1999. He joined HJK Helsinki youth sector when aged 11.

=== HJK ===
A product of his hometown club HJK, Pohjanpalo emerged through the youth ranks, first appearing with the reserve team (Klubi-04) in 2011 at the age of 16. He made his Veikkausliiga debut on 26 October 2011, starting against RoPS. During his first season in the Finnish second division with Klubi 04, he made 21 appearances, scored a record-breaking 33 league goals and was awarded as the series player of the season. Following his excellent performances with the reserves, Pohjanpalo signed a new contract with HJK on 7 December 2011, keeping him in the Finnish capital until 2015.

Pohjanpalo started HJK's first league match of the 2012 Veikkausliiga season on 15 April 2012, scoring a hat-trick within the space of three minutes (162 seconds) against IFK Mariehamn. After a three-day trial with Liverpool in August 2012, Pohjanpalo was offered a three-year contract but rejected the deal due to a lack of guaranteed playing time for Liverpool F.C. Reserves. He finished the 2012 season at HJK with 19 goals in 42 games in all competitions. He was awarded as the Veikkausliiga rookie of the season.

=== Bayer Leverkusen and loans ===
==== 2013–14: VfR Aalen (loan) ====
On 1 September 2013, Pohjanpalo was loaned to Bundesliga team Bayer Leverkusen for a loan fee of €500,000, who then loaned him further to 2. Bundesliga team VfR Aalen. At Aalen, Pohjanpalo started thirteen matches and appeared as a substitute in a further nine, scoring five goals.

==== 2014–16: Fortuna Düsseldorf (loan) ====
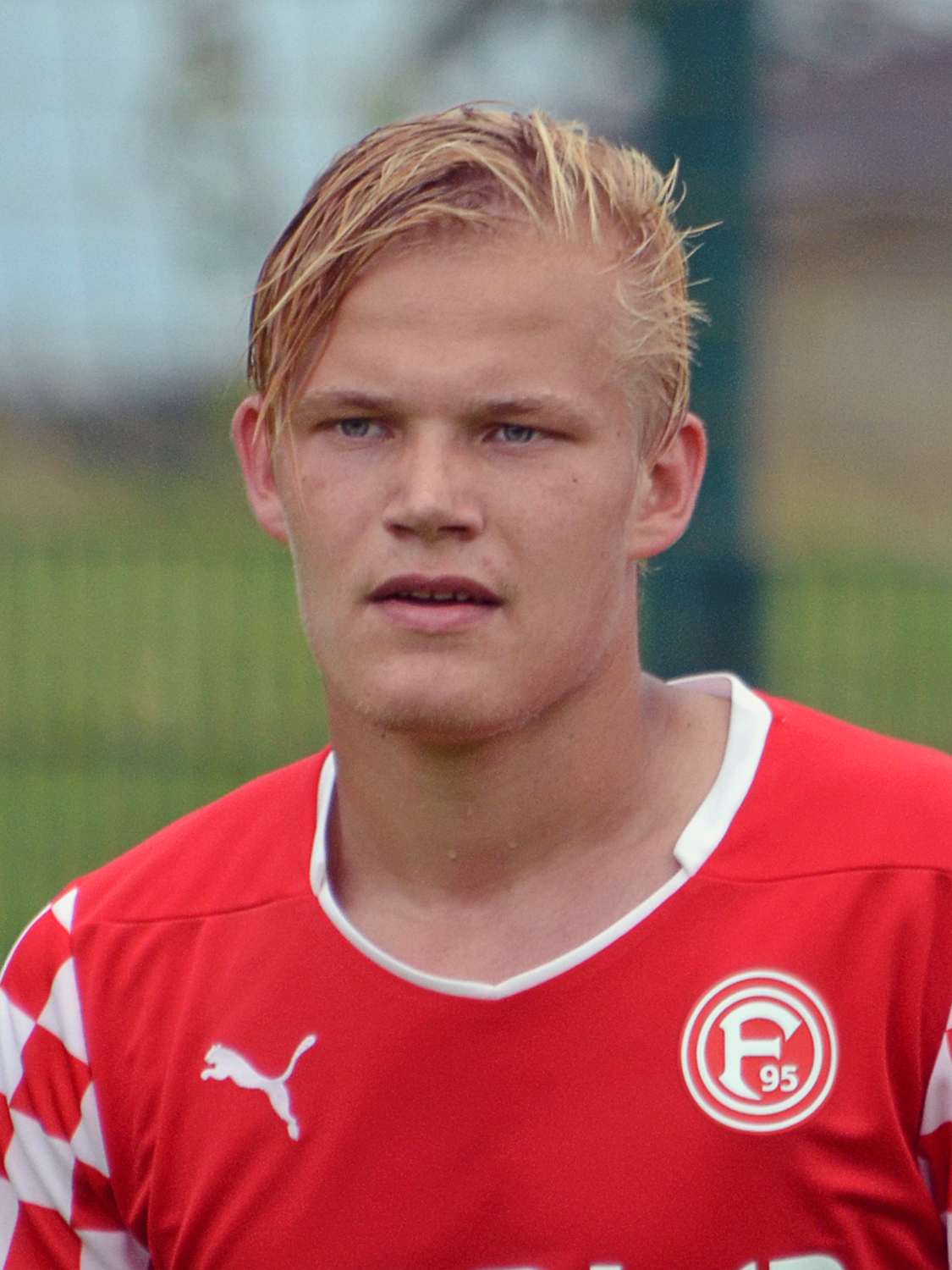
Pohjanpalo with Fortuna Düsseldorf in 2014

In April 2014, Pohjanpalo renewed his contract with HJK, extending it to 2018. At the same time HJK extended his loan contract with Bayer Leverkusen a further two years, which Pohjanpalo spent on loan at Fortuna Düsseldorf. He was voted the 2. Bundesliga Player of the Month in October 2014, following a hat-trick against Darmstadt 98. His loan spell with Fortuna Düsseldorf was extended for 2015–16 season. In March 2016, Pohjanpalo was assigned to the club's reserve team Fortuna Düsseldorf II for one week, due to appearing late at the local night club and thus breaking the entry ban and violating the club's code of conduct.

==== Bayer Leverkusen ====
On 21 March 2016, Leverkusen announced that they had exercised their option to permanently sign Pohjanpalo from HJK Helsinki for a transfer fee of €1.5 million. On 27 August 2016, Pohjanpalo finally made his debut for the club in their opening game of the 2016–17 Bundesliga season against Borussia Mönchengladbach. He scored just a minute after being substituted on, but it was not enough to prevent Leverkusen from losing 2–1. Pohjanpalo came off the bench in Leverkusen's second game of the season and scored a hat-trick, helping his side achieve a 3–1 win over Hamburger SV. After these two appearances, Pohjanpalo had scored four goals in just thirty minutes of play during the first two matches of the season.

His time with Leverkusen was plagued by multiple severe injuries, which caused him to miss around 70 league games, and almost ended his career prematurely. According to Pohjanpalo himself, he was forced to spend 580 days without playing football. During the seven years he was with the club, Pohjanpalo totalled only 28 appearances and scored eight goals for Leverkusen in all competitions combined, and when he was game-fit, he spent most of the time on loan.

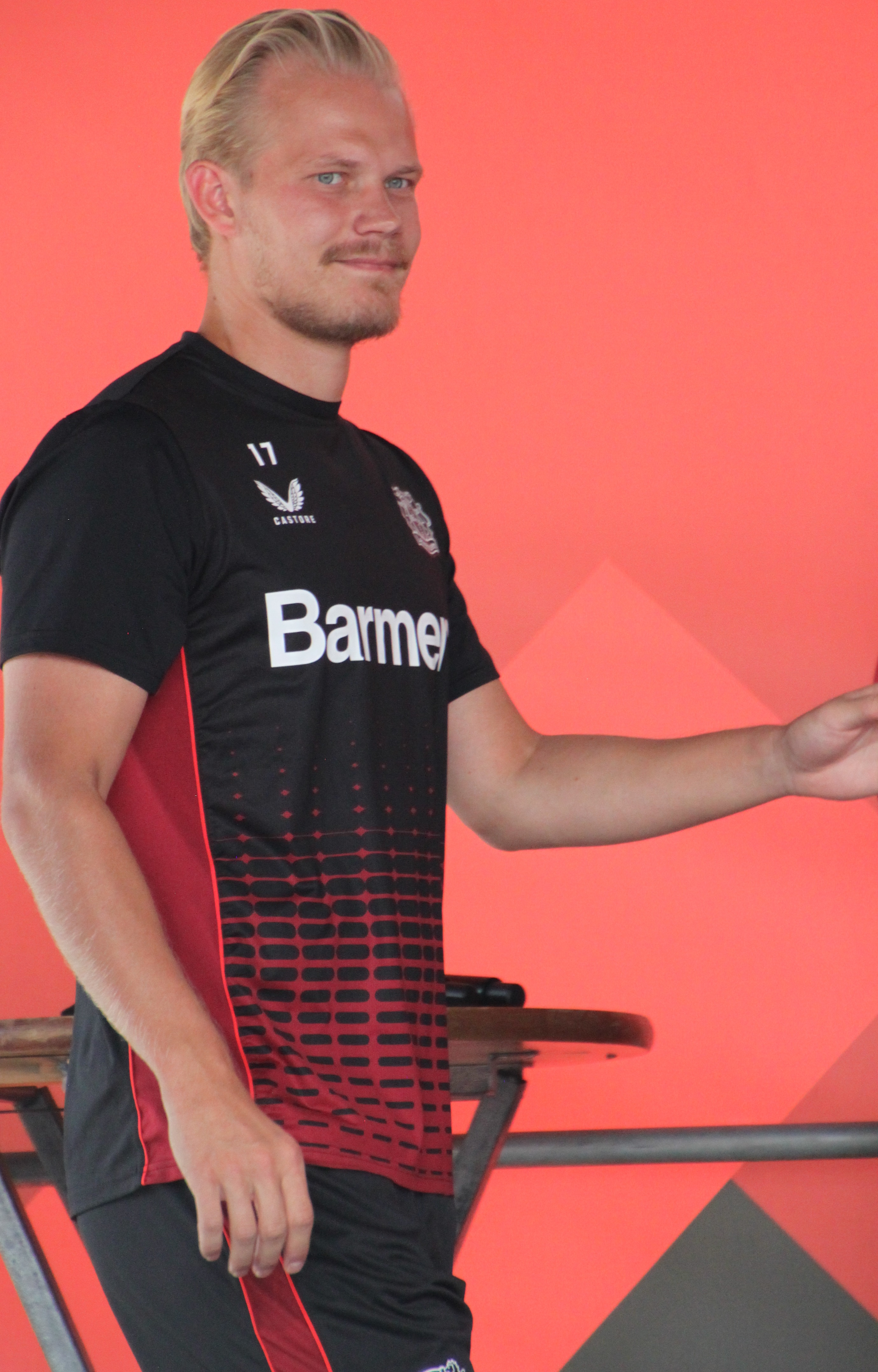
Pohjanpalo with Bayer Leverkusen in 2022

==== 2020: Hamburger SV (loan) ====
On 24 January 2020, Pohjanpalo joined Hamburger SV on loan for the rest of the 2019–20 season. Due to the COVID-19 pandemic, the campaign was interrupted from March to May 2020. Since the season continued in mid-May, Pohjanpalo scored seven goals in the next eight consecutive matches. Eventually he recorded 14 appearances and scored nine goals for HSV in 2. Bundesliga.

==== 2020–21: Union Berlin (loan) ====
On 30 September 2020, Pohjanpalo joined Bundesliga side Union Berlin on loan for the 2020–21 season. In November, Pohjanpalo suffered an ankle injury in an international match and missed a few months due to surgery. On 24 April 2021, Pohjanpalo scored a hat-trick in 17 minutes, in a 3–1 win against Werder Bremen.

==== 2021–22: Caykur Rizespor (loan) ====
Pohjanpalo was loaned out to Süper Lig side Caykur Rizespor for the 2021–22 season. On 18 March 2022, Pohjanpalo made a hat-trick after coming in from the bench as a 55th-minute substitute, in a 3–2 win against Trabzonspor, scoring all three goals from penalties. Towards the end of the season, his playing time decreased due to the club's upcoming relegation and his loan player status. Regardless of that, Pohjanpalo recorded 33 appearances and scored 16 goals for the club during his single season in Turkey.

=== Venezia ===
==== 2022–23 season ====
On 19 August 2022, Pohjanpalo left Leverkusen and signed a three-year contract with Venezia in Italy, with an option to extend for two more years. The transfer fee was reported to be €3.2 million including add-ons. In February, Pohjanpalo attracted wide international attention, as he celebrated his team's victory by having a beer with the fans at the stadium after the game. On 1 May, Pohjanpalo scored four goals as Venezia defeated Modena 5–0 at home, and repeated his beer with the fans-performance after the game. During his first season in Venezia, Pohjanpalo scored 19 goals and provided seven assists, making him the second best goalscorer of the 2022–23 Serie B season, behind Gianluca Lapadula. He was also named the Serie B Player of the Month twice, consecutively in April and in May 2023.

==== 2023–24 season ====
Despite the speculations and transfer rumours, on 13 September 2023 on his 29th birthday, Pohjanpalo renewed his contract with Venezia, signing a new deal until 30 June 2027. He was named one of the team captains. On 3 December, while being out of the line-up due to foot injury, Pohjanpalo and the club owner Duncan L. Niederauer were seen observing the match in the home stand with the ultra supporters, as Venezia defeated Ascoli at the Stadio Pier Luigi Penzo. On 14 January 2024, Pohjanpalo scored a hat-trick in a 5–3 home win against Sampdoria. Pohjanpalo was named the Serie B Player of the Month also in February and March 2024. On 15 March, in an away match against Palermo, Pohjanpalo received the standing ovation from the opposing team's home crowd after scoring a brace in a 3–0 win. In the 2023–24 season, Pohjanpalo scored 22 goals and became the top goalscorer of the Serie B. On 2 June, coached by Paolo Vanoli, Pohjanpalo captained Venezia to win a promotion back to Serie A via promotion play-offs, by defeating Palermo and Cremonese.

==== 2024–25 season ====
Pohjanpalo missed the first two matches of the 2024–25 Serie A season due to a minor injury, but eventually made his debut in the Italian top-tier on 30 August 2024, as a starter in a home match against Torino. On 21 September, he scored his first goal in Serie A, in a 2–0 home win against Genoa, becoming the second Finnish player after Përparim Hetemaj to score in the Italian highest tier. He scored his second goal of the season in the next round on 29 September against AS Roma at the Stadio Olimpico. On 30 October, Pohjanpalo had a man-of-the-match-performance by scoring a brace from the penalty spot, including a winning goal, in a 3–2 home win against Udinese, after Venezia had already been trailing 2–0 in the first half. He went on to make 20 appearances for the club in Serie A, scoring six goals, before leaving in the beginning of February 2025. At the time of his departure, Pohjanpalo had scored 48 goals for Venezia, making him the fifth-best goalscorer in the club's entire history.

=== Palermo ===
==== 2024–25 season ====
On 3 February 2025, Pohjanpalo was acquired by Serie B club Palermo. He was offered a substantial salary raise and a contract valid until June 2029. The transfer fee was reported to be around €5.5 million. The next day after the transfer, Pohjanpalo received a warm welcome to the club from hundreds of Rosanero fans at the Stadio Renzo Barbera. On 16 February, in his second match with the club, Pohjanpalo scored his first goal for Palermo, providing also an assist for his team in a 2–2 draw against Mantova. One week later, he scored his second goal for Palermo, in a 3–0 away win against Cosenza. After scoring a goal in a 1–1 draw against Sampdoria on 8 March, Pohjanpalo had scored four goals in four consecutive matches. On 6 April, he scored his first hat-trick of for Palermo, in a 5–3 home win against Sassuolo, providing also an assist. He was subsequently named the Serie B Player of the Week and included in the EA Sports FC 25 Team of the Week of week 30. He was voted the Palermo Player of the Month for April 2025 by the club's supporters. Later he was named also the Serie B Player of the Month, for the fifth time in his career.

==== 2025–26 season ====
Pohjanpalo started the 2025–26 season strong by scoring against Reggiana in the season opening match. On 14 September 2025, Pohjanpalo scored a brace for Palermo in a 2–0 away win against Südtirol. On 29 November, Pohjanpalo scored a hat-trick and provided an assist in a 5–0 home win over Carrarese. Later he was named the Serie B Player of the Month of November 2025. On 7 February 2026, Pohjanpalo scored a brace in a 3–2 home win over Empoli. After scoring four goals in four games, he was named the Serie B MVP for February, for the seventh time in his career, which is the most for any player in the league's history. On 18 April, he scored both goals in a 2–0 home win over Cesena. At the end of the season, Pohjanpalo was awarded Serie B top scorer, for the second time in his career.

== International career ==
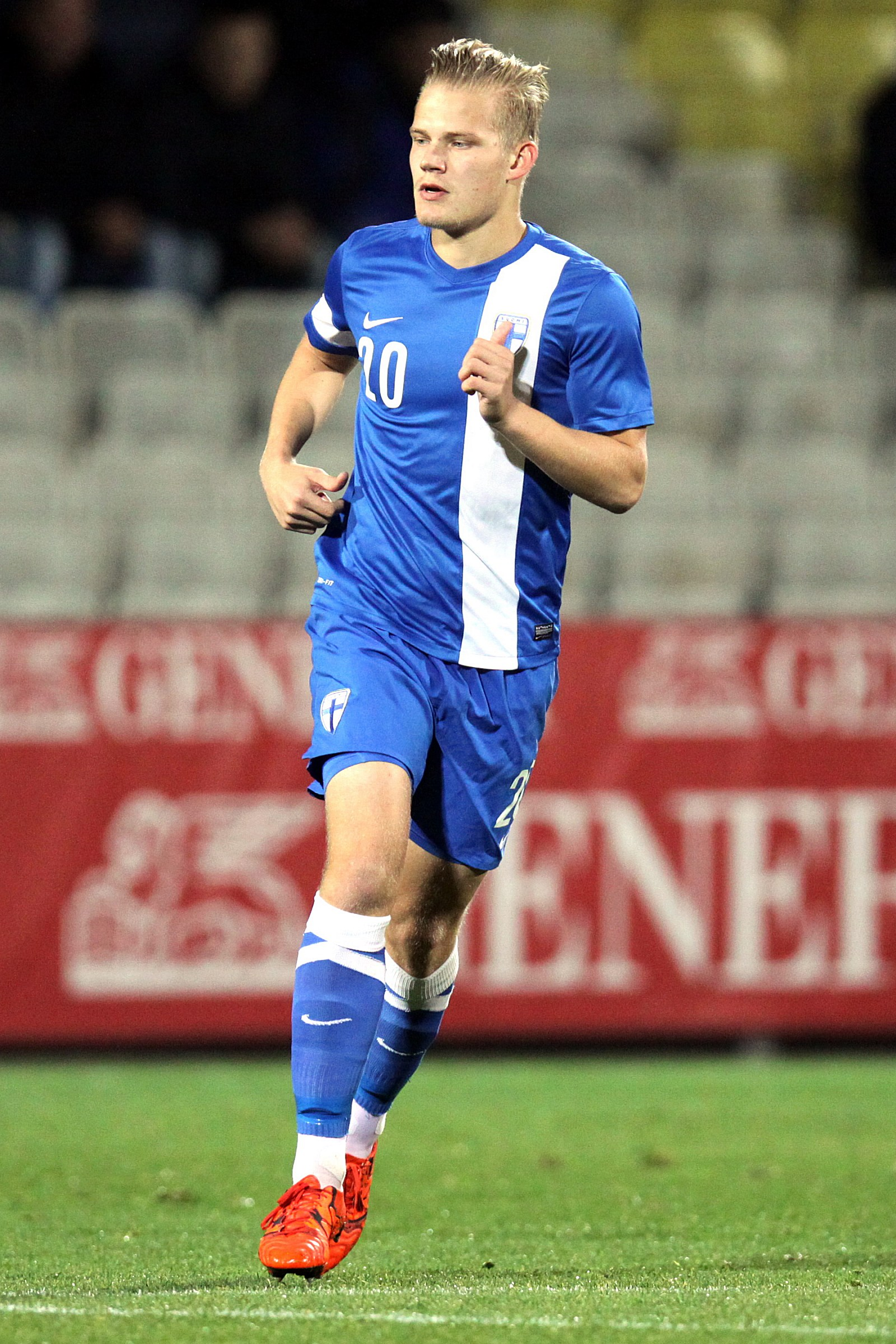
Pohjanpalo with Finland U21 in 2015

=== Youth ===
Pohjanpalo represented Finland at under-15, under-16, under-17, under-18 and under-19 youth international levels. He made his debut for the Finland under-21 national team at the age of 17 on 5 June 2012 against Slovenia.

=== Senior ===
Pohjanpalo made his senior national team debut on 14 November 2012 in a 3−0 victory against Cyprus when he replaced Teemu Pukki as a substitute on the 70th minute. He was close to scoring in a friendly against Slovenia when his shot hit the post and was then finished by Kasper Hämäläinen. In the next friendly game against Hungary he finished his first international goal entering the field as a substitute and equalising the game. He made his UEFA European Championship qualification match debut on 7 September 2014 in a match against Faroe Islands when he entered as an 89th-minute substitute for Teemu Pukki. He scored his first goal in a competitive match on 4 September 2015 in a UEFA Euro 2016 qualifying match in Karaiskakis Stadium, Piraeus against Greece.

On 12 June 2021, Pohjanpalo scored the only goal, a header, in a 1–0 win over Denmark, in Finland's opening match in the UEFA Euro 2020 final tournament, granting his country their first goal and win in a major competition. He abstained from celebrating the goal out of respect for Denmark midfielder Christian Eriksen, who had suffered a life-threatening cardiac arrest earlier during the match.

In September 2026, in a UEFA Nations League C match against San Marino, Pohjanpalo scored his first hat-trick in the national team.

== Personal life ==
Pohjanpalo and his German girlfriend Catharina Gericke were married in the midsummer 2022. The wedding ceremony was held in Southern France. They have a daughter, born in 2024. As of 2024, they have homes in Helsinki, Finland, Düsseldorf, Germany and Venezia, Italy. Until 2025, Pohjanpalo was a co-owner of a physical therapy and physical coaching company Helsinki Athletic Lab, along with his national team and Venezia teammate Jesse Joronen.

Since the age of 17, Pohjanpalo has been a sponsor for Valio Akatemia, a project of Finnish dairy manufacturer Valio, supporting children's sport hobbies and wellbeing by stipends.

Pohjanpalo speaks Finnish, English, German and Italian.

== Career statistics ==
=== Club ===
As of match played 7 September 2026

Appearances and goals by club, season and competition
Club	Season	League			National cup (Note: Includes Finnish Cup, DFB-Pokal, Turkish Cup, Coppa Italia)		League cup (Note: Includes Finnish League Cup)		Europe		Other		Total	
Club	Season	Division	Apps	Goals	Apps	Goals	Apps	Goals	Apps	Goals	Apps	Goals	Apps	Goals
Klubi-04	2010	Ykkönen	1	0	0	0	—		—		—		1	0
Klubi-04	2011	Kakkonen	25	33	0	0	—		—		—		25	33
Klubi-04	Total		26	33	0	0	—		—		—		26	33
HJK	2011	Veikkausliiga	1	0	0	0	0	0	0	0	—		1	0
HJK	2012	Veikkausliiga	28	11	2	1	8	4	4 (Note: Three appearances and two goals in UEFA Champions League, one appearance and one goal in UEFA Europa League)	3	—		42	19
HJK	2013	Veikkausliiga	21	5	1	0	3	0	2 (Note: Appearances in UEFA Champions League)	0	—		27	5
HJK	Total		50	16	3	1	11	4	6	3	—		70	24
Aalen (loan)	2013–14	2. Bundesliga	22	5	0	0	—		—		—		22	5
Fortuna Düsseldorf (loan)	2014–15	2. Bundesliga	29	11	1	0	—		—		—		30	11
Fortuna Düsseldorf (loan)	2015–16	2. Bundesliga	26	2	2	0	—		—		—		28	2
Fortuna Düsseldorf (loan)	Total		55	13	3	0	—		—		—		58	13
Fortuna Düsseldorf II (loan)	2015–16	Regionalliga West	1	0	—		—		—		—		1	0
Bayer Leverkusen	2016–17	Bundesliga	11	6	0	0	—		2	0	—		13	6
Bayer Leverkusen	2017–18	Bundesliga	7	1	1	1	—		—		—		8	2
Bayer Leverkusen	2018–19	Bundesliga	0	0	0	0	—		0	0	—		0	0
Bayer Leverkusen	2019–20	Bundesliga	1	0	0	0	—		0	0	—		1	0
Bayer Leverkusen	2020–21	Bundesliga	1	0	0	0	—		0	0	—		1	0
Bayer Leverkusen	2021–22	Bundesliga	2	0	1	0	—		0	0	—		3	0
Bayer Leverkusen	2022–23	Bundesliga	1	0	1	0	—		0	0	—		2	0
Bayer Leverkusen	Total		23	7	3	1	—		2	0	—		28	8
Hamburger SV (loan)	2019–20	2. Bundesliga	14	9	—		—		—		—		14	9
Union Berlin (loan)	2020–21	Bundesliga	19	6	0	0	—		—		—		19	6
Çaykur Rizespor (loan)	2021–22	Süper Lig	33	16	0	0	—		—		—		33	16
Venezia	2022–23	Serie B	37	19	0	0	—		—		1 (Note: Appearance(s) in Serie B promotion play-offs)	0	38	19
Venezia	2023–24	Serie B	33	22	1	1	—		—		4	0	38	23
Venezia	2024–25	Serie A	20	6	0	0	—		—		—		20	6
Venezia	Total		90	47	1	1	—		—		5	0	96	48
Palermo	2024–25	Serie B	14	9	—		—		—		1	0	15	9
Palermo	2025–26	Serie B	38	24	1	0	—		—		2	1	41	25
Palermo	2026–27	Serie B	3	1	2	3	—		—		—		5	4
Palermo	Total		55	34	3	3	—		—		3	1	61	38
Career total			388	186	13	6	11	4	8	3	8	1	428	201

=== International ===
As of match played 15 November 2026

Appearances and goals by national team and year
National team	Year	Apps	Goals
Finland	2012	1	0
Finland	2013	1	0
Finland	2014	9	1
Finland	2015	7	3
Finland	2016	4	0
Finland	2017	7	2
Finland	2018	1	0
Finland	2019	2	1
Finland	2020	6	0
Finland	2021	13	4
Finland	2022	8	2
Finland	2023	10	2
Finland	2024	8	1
Finland	2025	8	2
Finland	2026	10	6
Total		95	24

As of match played 15 November 2026
Scores and results list Finland's goal tally first, score column indicates score after each Pohjanpalo goal.

List of international goals scored by Joel Pohjanpalo
No.	Date	Venue	Opponent	Score	Result	Competition
1	5 March 2014	ETO Park, Győr, Hungary	Hungary	1–1	2–1	Friendly
2	4 September 2015	Karaiskaki Stadium, Athens, Greece	Greece	1–0	1–0	UEFA Euro 2016 qualification
3	7 September 2015	Olympic Stadium, Helsinki, Finland	Faroe Islands	1–0	1–0	UEFA Euro 2016 qualification
4	8 October 2015	Arena Națională, Bucharest, Romania	Romania	1–0	1–1	UEFA Euro 2016 qualification
5	11 June 2017	Tampere Stadium, Tampere, Finland	Ukraine	1–1	1–2	2018 FIFA World Cup qualification
6	9 October 2017	Veritas Stadion, Turku, Finland	Turkey	2–2	2–2	2018 FIFA World Cup qualification
7	12 October 2019	Bilino Polje Stadium, Zenica, Bosnia and Herzegovina	Bosnia and Herzegovina	1–4	1–4	UEFA Euro 2020 qualification
8	31 March 2021	Kybunpark, St. Gallen, Switzerland	Switzerland	1–1	2–3	Friendly
9	31 March 2021	Kybunpark, St. Gallen, Switzerland	Switzerland	2–1	2–3	Friendly
10	12 June 2021	Parken Stadium, Copenhagen, Denmark	Denmark	1–0	1–0	UEFA Euro 2020
11	4 September 2021	Olympic Stadium, Helsinki, Finland	Kazakhstan	1–0	1–0	2022 FIFA World Cup qualification
12	7 June 2022	Olympic Stadium, Helsinki, Finland	Montenegro	1–0	2–0	2022–23 UEFA Nations League B
13	7 June 2022	Olympic Stadium, Helsinki, Finland	Montenegro	2–0	2–0	2022–23 UEFA Nations League B
14	16 June 2023	Olympic Stadium, Helsinki, Finland	Slovenia	1–0	2–0	UEFA Euro 2024 qualification
15	17 November 2023	Olympic Stadium, Helsinki, Finland	Northern Ireland	1–0	4–0	UEFA Euro 2024 qualification
16	10 October 2024	Olympic Stadium, Helsinki, Finland	Republic of Ireland	1–0	1–2	2024–25 UEFA Nations League B
17	24 March 2025	Darius and Girėnas Stadium, Kaunas, Lithuania	Lithuania	2–0	2–2	2026 FIFA World Cup qualification
18	10 June 2025	Olympic Stadium, Helsinki, Finland	Poland	1–0	2–1	2026 FIFA World Cup qualification
19	27 March 2026	Eden Park, Auckland, New Zealand	New Zealand	1–0	2–0	2026 FIFA Series
20	26 September 2026	San Marino Stadium, Serravalle, San Marino	San Marino	1–0	7–0	2026–27 UEFA Nations League C
21	26 September 2026	San Marino Stadium, Serravalle, San Marino	San Marino	6–0	7–0	2026–27 UEFA Nations League C
22	26 September 2026	San Marino Stadium, Serravalle, San Marino	San Marino	7–0	7–0	2026–27 UEFA Nations League C
23	15 November 2026	Bolt Arena, Helsinki, Finland	San Marino	4–1	7–2	2026–27 UEFA Nations League C
24	15 November 2026	Bolt Arena, Helsinki, Finland	San Marino	5–1	7–2	2026–27 UEFA Nations League C

== Honours ==
Klubi-04

- Kakkonen, Group A: 2011

HJK

- Veikkausliiga (3): 2011, 2012, 2013
- Finnish League Cup runner-up: 2012

Venezia

- Serie B promotion play-offs: 2023–24

Finland

- FIFA Series: 2026

Individual

- Serie B top goalscorer: 2023–24, 2025–26
- Serie B Player of the Month: April 2023, May 2023, February 2024, March 2024, April 2025, November 2025, February 2026
- 2. Bundesliga Player of the Month: October 2014
- Veikkausliiga Rookie of the Season: 2012
- Kakkonen, Group A Player of the Season: 2011
- Kakkonen Top scorer: 2011
