= Michael Svoboda =

Austrian footballer

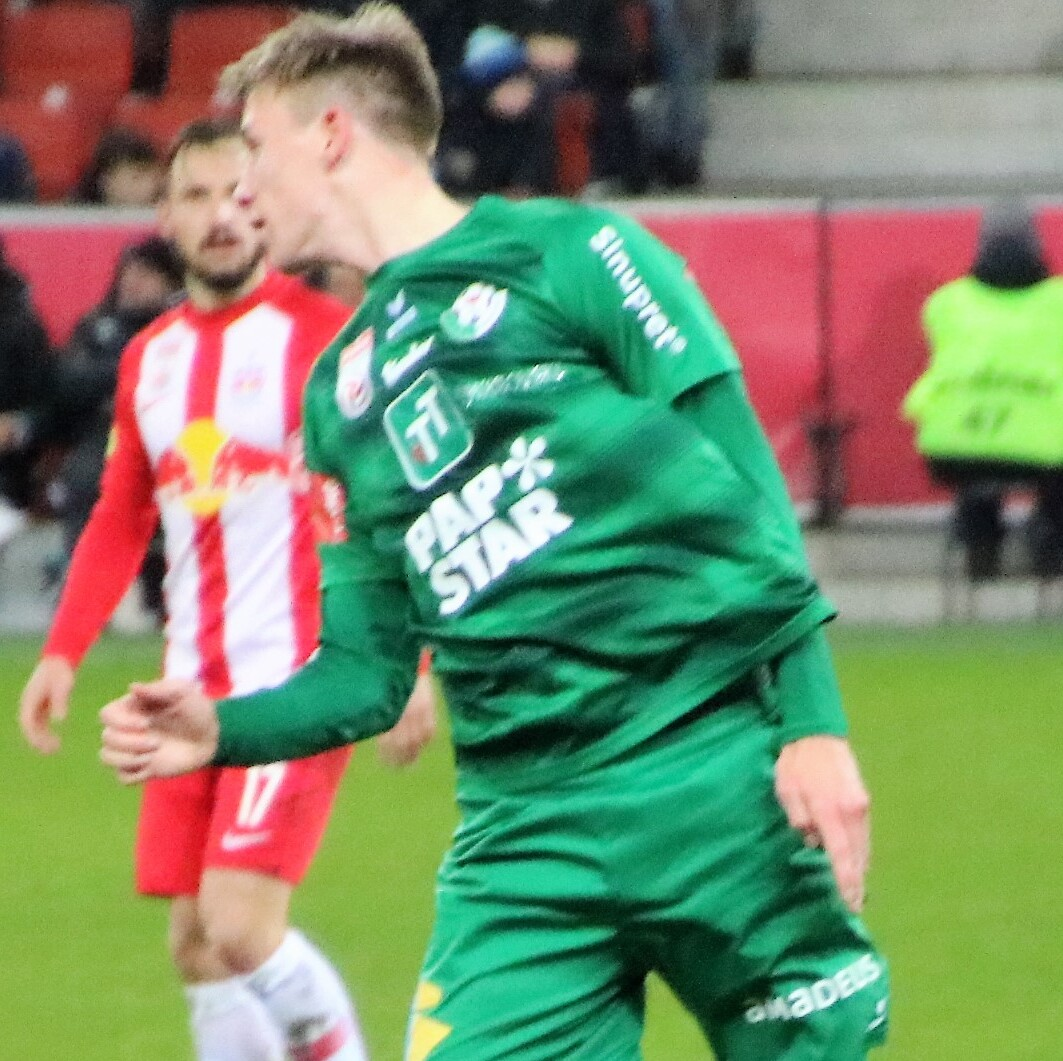
- Svoboda with WSG Tirol in 2019

Personal information
- Date of birth: 15 October 1998 (age 28)
- Place of birth: Vienna, Austria
- Height: 1.95 m (6 ft 5 in)
- Position: Centre-back

Team information
- Current team: Brighton & Hove Albion
- Number: 30

Youth career
- 2004–2005: KSV Ankerbrot
- 2005–2006: Rapid Wien
- 2006–2016: SV Schwechat

Senior career*
Years	Team	Apps	(Gls)
2016	SV Schwechat	3	(0)
2016–2018	FC Stadlau	42	(3)
2018–2020	WSG Tirol	57	(5)
2020–2026	Venezia	127	(5)
2026–	Brighton & Hove Albion	2	(0)

International career^{‡}
2024–	Austria	5	(0)
- * Club domestic league appearances and goals as of 18 October 2026 ‡ National team caps and goals as of 17 November 2026

Michael Svoboda (born 15 October 1998) is an Austrian professional footballer who plays as a centre-back for Premier League club Brighton & Hove Albion and the Austria national team.

== Club career ==
=== Early career ===
Svoboda started his career at SV Schwechat, before joining FC Stadlau in 2016. On 23 May 2018, Svoboda joined 2. Liga side WSG Tirol.

=== Venezia ===
On 20 August 2020, Svoboda signed a three-year contract with Serie B club Venezia. He made his debut for the club on 14 November 2020, in a 2–0 win against Virtus Entella. He scored his first goal for the club on 4 January 2021, in a 1–1 draw with Pisa.

On 10 July 2024, Svoboda signed a new two-year contract with the club.

=== Brighton & Hove Albion ===
On 2 July 2026, Svoboda joined English Premier League side Brighton & Hove Albion on a four-year contract for an undisclosed fee.

== International career ==
Svoboda made his debut for the Austria national team on 10 October 2024 in a UEFA Nations League game against Kazakhstan at the Raiffeisen Arena. He substituted Gernot Trauner in the 62nd minute, as Austria won 4–0.

On 18 May 2026, Svoboda was selected in Ralf Rangnick’s 26-man squad for the 2026 FIFA World Cup, marking Austria’s first appearance in the tournament since 1998.

== Career statistics ==
=== Club ===
As of match played 5 November 2026

Appearances and goals by club, season and competition
Club	Season	League			National cup (Note: Includes Austrian Cup, Coppa Italia)		League cup		Europe		Other		Total	
Club	Season	Division	Apps	Goals	Apps	Goals	Apps	Goals	Apps	Goals	Apps	Goals	Apps	Goals
Schwechat	2015–16	Regionalliga Ost	3	0	0	0	—		—		—		3	0
Stadlau	2016–17	Regionalliga Ost	11	1	0	0	—		—		—		11	1
Stadlau	2017–18	Regionalliga Ost	31	2	1	0	—		—		—		32	2
Stadlau	Total		42	3	1	0	—		—		—		43	3
WSG Tirol	2018–19	2. Liga	26	4	2	0	—		—		—		28	4
WSG Tirol	2019–20	Austrian Bundesliga	31	1	3	0	—		—		—		34	1
WSG Tirol	Total		57	5	5	0	—		—		—		62	5
Venezia	2020–21	Serie B	19	1	2	0	—		—		4 (Note: Appearance(s) in Serie B promotion play-offs)	0	25	1
Venezia	2021–22	Serie A	18	0	3	0	—		—		—		21	0
Venezia	2022–23	Serie B	22	0	0	0	—		—		1	0	23	0
Venezia	2023–24	Serie B	23	0	0	0	—		—		—		23	0
Venezia	2024–25	Serie A	16	1	1	0	—		—		—		17	1
Venezia	2025–26	Serie B	29	3	1	0	—		—		—		30	3
Venezia	Total		127	5	7	0	—		—		5	0	139	5
Brighton & Hove Albion	2026–27	Premier League	2	0	0	0	1	0	3 (Note: Appearances in UEFA Conference League)	0	—		6	0
Career total			231	13	13	0	1	0	3	0	5	0	253	13

=== International ===
As of match played 17 November 2026

Appearances and goals by national team and year
National team	Year	Apps	Goals
Austria	2024	2	0
Austria	2025	0	0
Austria	2026	3	0
Total		5	0

== Honours ==
WSG Tirol

- 2. Liga: 2018–19

Venezia

- Serie B Promotion play-offs: 2023–24
