= Matteo Grandi =

Italian footballer

Personal information
- Date of birth: 12 October 1992 (age 34)
- Place of birth: Faenza, Italy
- Height: 1.90 m (6 ft 3 in)
- Position: Goalkeeper

Youth career
- –2007: Virtus Faenza
- 2007–2011: Cesena

Senior career*
| Years | Team | Apps | (Gls) |
| 2011–2018 | Cesena | 0 | (0) |
| 2011–2012 | → Borgo a Buggiano (loan) | 33 | (0) |
| 2012–2013 | → Südtirol (loan) | 6 | (0) |
| 2013–2014 | → Pergolettese (loan) | 32 | (0) |
| 2014–2015 | → Bassano Virtus (loan) | 2 | (0) |
| 2015–2017 | → Catanzaro (loan) | 43 | (0) |
| 2017 | → Latina (loan) | 3 | (0) |
| 2017–2018 | → Bassano Virtus (loan) | 34 | (0) |
| 2018–2023 | LR Vicenza | 114 | (0) |
| 2023 | Sangiuliano | 17 | (0) |
| 2023– | Venezia | 0 | (0) |
- * Club domestic league appearances and goals as of 25 May 2025

Matteo Grandi (born 12 October 1992) is an Italian professional footballer who plays as a goalkeeper.

== Career ==
Grandi was a youth product of A.C. Cesena. He spent the first few seasons on loan to other clubs. He made his professional debut in the Lega Pro Prima Divisione for Südtirol on 2 September 2012 in a game against AlbinoLeffe.

After the bankruptcy of both A.C. Cesena and Vicenza Calcio, Grandi signed a new contract with L.R. Vicenza Virtus (formerly Bassano Virtus until May 2018), a club that he spent 2017–18 season on loan.

On 13 January 2023, Grandi signed a 1.5-year contract with Sangiuliano.

== Career statistics ==
As of match played 3 December 2025

Appearances and goals by club, season and competition
| Club | Season | League | | | National cup (Note: Includes Finnish Cup, DFB-Pokal, Turkish Cup, Coppa Italia) | | Other | | Total | |
| Club | Season | Division | Apps | Goals | Apps | Goals | Apps | Goals | Apps | Goals |
|---|---|---|---|---|---|---|---|---|---|---|
| Borgo a Buggiano (loan) | 2011–12 | Lega Pro 2D | 33 | 0 | 0 | 0 | — | | 33 | 0 |
| Südtirol (loan) | 2012–13 | Lega Pro 1 D | 6 | 0 | 1 | 0 | — | | 7 | 0 |
| Pergolettese (loan) | 2013–14 | Lega Pro 2D | 32 | 0 | 1 | 0 | — | | 33 | 0 |
| Bassano Virtus (loan) | 2014–15 | Lega Pro | 2 | 0 | 4 | 0 | 5 | 0 | 11 | 0 |
| Catanzaro (loan) | 2015–16 | Lega Pro | 28 | 0 | 0 | 0 | — | | 28 | 0 |
| Catanzaro (loan) | 2016–17 | Lega Pro | 15 | 0 | 2 | 0 | — | | 17 | 0 |
| Catanzaro (loan) | Total | | 43 | 0 | 2 | 0 | — | | 45 | 0 |
| Latina (loan) | 2016–17 | Serie B | 3 | 0 | — | | — | | 3 | 0 |
| Bassano Virtus (loan) | 2017–18 | Serie C | 34 | 0 | 1 | 0 | 2 | 0 | 37 | 0 |
| LR Vicenza | 2018–19 | Serie C | 34 | 0 | 2 | 0 | 1 | 0 | 36 | 0 |
| LR Vicenza | 2019–20 | Serie C | 26 | 0 | 1 | 0 | — | | 27 | 0 |
| LR Vicenza | 2020–21 | Serie B | 29 | 0 | 0 | 0 | — | | 29 | 0 |
| LR Vicenza | 2021–22 | Serie B | 25 | 0 | 0 | 0 | 0 | 0 | 25 | 0 |
| LR Vicenza | 2022–23 | Serie C | 0 | 0 | 1 | 0 | — | | 1 | 0 |
| LR Vicenza | Total | | 114 | 0 | 4 | 0 | 1 | 0 | 119 | 0 |
| Sangiuliano | 2022–23 | Serie C | 17 | 0 | — | | 2 | 0 | 19 | 0 |
| Venezia | 2023–24 | Serie B | 0 | 0 | 0 | 0 | 0 | 0 | 0 | 0 |
| Venezia | 2024–25 | Serie A | 0 | 0 | 0 | 0 | — | | 0 | 0 |
| Venezia | 2025–26 | Serie B | 0 | 0 | 1 | 0 | — | | 1 | 0 |
| Venezia | 2026–27 | Serie A | 0 | 0 | 0 | 0 | — | | 0 | 0 |
| Venezia | Total | | 0 | 0 | 1 | 0 | 0 | 0 | 1 | 0 |
| Career total | | | 284 | 0 | 14 | 0 | 10 | 0 | 308 | 0 |

== Honours ==
LR Vicenza

- Serie C: 2019–20
- Coppa Italia Serie C: 2022–23
