= Hans Nicolussi Caviglia =

Italian footballer (born 2000)

Personal information
- Full name: Hans Nicolussi Caviglia
- Date of birth: 18 June 2000 (age 26)
- Place of birth: Aosta, Italy
- Height: 1.80 m (5 ft 11 in)
- Position: Midfielder

Team information
- Current team: Parma
- Number: 41

Youth career
- Juventus

Senior career*
Years	Team	Apps	(Gls)
2018–2022	Juventus Next Gen	14	(0)
2019–2025	Juventus	11	(0)
2019–2020	→ Perugia (loan)	27	(1)
2020–2021	→ Parma (loan)	0	(0)
2022–2023	→ Südtirol (loan)	17	(2)
2023	→ Salernitana (loan)	12	(1)
2024–2025	→ Venezia (loan)	35	(4)
2025–2026	Venezia	0	(0)
2025–2026	→ Fiorentina (loan)	11	(0)
2026	→ Parma (loan)	15	(0)
2026–	Parma	0	(0)

International career^{‡}
2016–2017	Italy U17	6	(2)
2017–2018	Italy U18	13	(3)
2018–2019	Italy U19	5	(0)
2020	Italy U21	1	(0)
- * Club domestic league appearances and goals as of 25 May 2026 ‡ National team caps and goals as of 23:48, 20 November 2021 (UTC)

Hans Nicolussi Caviglia (born 18 June 2000) is an Italian professional footballer who plays as a midfielder for Serie A club Parma.

== Club career ==
Having come through the youth ranks of Juventus, Nicolussi Caviglia made his Serie C debut for Juventus U23 on 27 September 2018 in a game against Cuneo as an 88th-minute substitute for Idrissa Touré. On 8 March 2019, he made his Juventus senior debut in Serie A, coming on as a late substitute for Moise Kean in a 4–1 home victory over Udinese.

On 2 September 2019, he joined Serie B club Perugia on loan.

On 5 October 2020, he went to Serie A side Parma on loan. On 28 October, he made his Parma debut in Coppa Italia, starting in a 3–1 home victory over Pescara. However, on 15 December, during a training session, Nicolussi tore his ACL and needed to end his season early. Prior to this injury, Nicolussi Caviglia had only been fielded twice: the other match he played was a 2–1 win Coppa Italia against Cosenza on 25 November.

On 18 August 2021, he had a meniscus tear. On 30 October, Nicolussi Caviglia returned being called up for a match after the two injuries in a Juventus U23 match against Südtirol set to be played the following day. Against the same opponents, on 3 November, he returned playing after his injuries in a 2–1 Coppa Italia Serie C defeat, coming on as substitute in the 58th minute and scoring a goal four minutes later; he had not been playing since 25 November 2020. Nicolussi Caviglia suffered a new knee injury on 20 November, during a match against Fiorenzuola. He was kept far from the pitch until 4 May 2022, when he first entered the field in a match against Pro Vercelli. On 10 May, Nicolussi Caviglia was first called up since his injuries by the first team for the 2022 Coppa Italia Final.

On 12 July 2022, he was sent on loan to Serie B side Südtirol. On 22 October, he scored their winner against his former team Parma with a shoot under the top corner at the 29th minute.

On 5 January 2023, Nicolussi Caviglia was recalled by Juventus, subsequently joining fellow Serie A side Salernitana on loan until the end of the season, with option and counter-option to buy.

On 22 August 2024, Venezia announced the signing of Nicolussi Caviglia on loan from Juventus, with an obligation to buy.

On 30 August 2025, Nicolussi Caviglia moved to Fiorentina on loan with a conditional obligation to buy. On 29 January 2026, he returned to Parma on a new loan, also with a conditional obligation to buy.

== International career ==
Nicolussi Caviglia was first called up to represent his country in December 2016 for the Italy U17. He was included in the squad for 2017 UEFA European Under-17 Championship and made one appearance, scoring against Spain as Italy did not advance from the group stage.

He was later called up to the U18 and U19 squads' friendlies. With the Italy U19 squad he took part in the 2019 UEFA European Under-19 Championship.

On 13 October 2020, he made his debut with the Italy U21, playing as a substitute in a qualifying match won 2–0 against Republic of Ireland in Pisa.

In December 2022, he was involved in a training camp led by the Italian senior national team's manager, Roberto Mancini, and aimed to the most promising national talents.

He was called up to the senior team again in October 2025.

== Career statistics ==
=== Club ===
As of match played 24 May 2026

Appearances and goals by club, season and competition
Club	Season	League			Coppa Italia		Other		Total	
Club	Season	Division	Apps	Goals	Apps	Goals	Apps	Goals	Apps	Goals
Juventus U23	2018–19	Serie C	8	0	—		—		8	0
Juventus U23	2021–22	Serie C	2	0	—		5 (Note: One appearance and one goal in Coppa Italia Serie C, four appearances in Serie C promotion play-offs)	1	7	1
Juventus U23	Total		10	0	0	0	5	1	15	1
Juventus	2018–19	Serie A	3	0	0	0	—		3	0
Juventus	2023–24	Serie A	8	0	2	0	—		10	0
Juventus	Total		11	0	2	0	0	0	13	0
Perugia (loan)	2019–20	Serie B	29	1	1	1	2 (Note: Appearances in Serie B relegation play-out)	0	32	2
Parma (loan)	2020–21	Serie A	0	0	2	0	—		2	0
Südtirol (loan)	2022–23	Serie B	17	2	1	0	—		18	2
Salernitana (loan)	2022–23	Serie A	12	1	0	0	—		12	1
Venezia (loan)	2024–25	Serie A	35	4	0	0	—		35	4
Fiorentina (loan)	2025–26	Serie A	11	0	0	0	5 (Note: Appearances in UEFA Conference League)	0	16	0
Parma (loan)	2025–26	Serie A	15	0	—		—		15	0
Career total			134	8	6	1	12	1	152	9

=== International ===
As of match played 13 November 2020

Appearances and goals by national team, year and competition
Team	Year	Competitive		Friendly		Total	
Team	Year	Apps	Goals	Apps	Goals	Apps	Goals
Italy U17	2016	—		1	0	1	0
Italy U17	2017	5	1	3	0	8	1
Italy U17	Total	5	1	4	0	6	1
Italy U18	2017	—		4	2	4	2
Italy U18	2018	—		4	0	4	0
Italy U18	Total	0	0	8	2	8	2
Italy U19	2018	—		4	0	4	0
Italy U19	2019	1	0	—		1	0
Italy U19	Total	1	0	4	0	5	0
Italy U21	2020	1	0	—		1	0
Career total		7	1	16	2	23	3

== Honours ==
Juventus

- Coppa Italia: 2023–24
