= Mikael Egill Ellertsson =

Icelandic footballer

Mikael Ellertsson
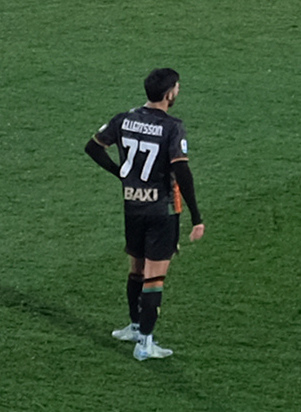
- Ellertsson in 2025 with Venezia

Personal information
- Full name: Mikael Egill Ellertsson
- Date of birth: 11 March 2002 (age 24)
- Place of birth: Reykjavík, Iceland
- Height: 1.82 m (6 ft 0 in)
- Positions: Full-back; wing-back; central midfielder

Team information
- Current team: Genoa
- Number: 77

Youth career
- –2018: Fram Reykjavik
- 2018–2021: SPAL

Senior career*
Years	Team	Apps	(Gls)
2018	Fram Reykjavik	8	(0)
2021	SPAL	2	(0)
2021–2023	Spezia	11	(0)
2021–2022	→ SPAL (loan)	4	(0)
2023–2025	Venezia	72	(6)
2025–	Genoa	47	(3)
2025	→ Venezia (loan)	18	(0)

International career^{‡}
2017–2018	Iceland U16	5	(0)
2018–2019	Iceland U17	13	(3)
2018–2019	Iceland U18	4	(0)
2019	Iceland U19	4	(0)
2021–2023	Iceland U21	2	(0)
2021–	Iceland	36	(4)
- * Club domestic league appearances and goals as of 22:55, 8 November 2026 (UTC) ‡ National team caps and goals as of 16 November 2026

Mikael Egill Ellertsson (born 11 March 2002) is an Icelandic professional footballer who plays as a full-back, wing-back or central midfielder for Serie A club Genoa and the Iceland national team.

== Club career ==
Ellertsson made his professional debut for SPAL on the 14 August 2021, replacing Moustapha Yabre during the 2–1 Coppa Italia loss against Benevento, just a few days after scoring a brace in the 5–0 friendly win against Adriese.

On 30 August 2021, Ellertsson signed a five-year contract for Spezia; on the same day he returned to SPAL on loan until 2022.

On 26 January 2023, Ellertsson joined Venezia in Serie B and signed a contract through the 2026–27 season.

On 31 January 2025, Ellertsson signed with Genoa and was loaned back to Venezia for the remainder of the 2024–25 season.

== International career ==
Having played for the country at youth level, Ellertsson made his debut for the Iceland national team on 8 October 2021 in a World Cup qualifier against Armenia.

== Personal life ==
Born in Iceland, Ellertsson is of Indonesian descent on his mother's side.

== Career statistics ==
=== Club ===
As of match played 8 November 2026

Appearances and goals by club, season and competition
Club	Season	League			National cup (Note: Includes Icelandic Men's Football Cup, Coppa Italia)		Total	
Club	Season	Division	Apps	Goals	Apps	Goals	Apps	Goals
Fram Reykjavik	2018	1. deild karla	8	0	2	0	10	0
SPAL	2021–22	Serie B	2	0	1	0	3	0
Spezia	2022–23	Serie A	11	0	2	0	13	0
SPAL (loan)	2021–22	Serie B	4	0	0	0	4	0
Venezia	2022–23	Serie B	17	2	0	0	17	2
Venezia	2023–24	Serie B	37	2	1	0	38	2
Venezia	2024–25	Serie A	36	2	0	0	36	2
Venezia	Total		90	6	1	0	91	6
Genoa	2025–26	Serie A	36	1	1	0	37	1
Genoa	2026–27	Serie A	11	2	1	0	12	2
Genoa	Total		47	3	2	0	49	3
Career Total			162	9	8	0	170	9

=== International ===
As of match played 16 November 2026

Appearances and goals by national team and year
National team	Year	Apps	Goals
Iceland	2021	4	0
Iceland	2022	6	0
Iceland	2023	4	1
Iceland	2024	5	0
Iceland	2025	8	1
Iceland	2026	9	2
Total		36	4

Scores and results list Iceland's goal tally first.

List of international goals scored by Mikael Egill Ellertsson
No.	Cap	Date	Venue	Opponent	Score	Result	Competition
1	12	26 March 2023	Rheinpark Stadion, Vaduz, Liechtenstein	Liechtenstein	7–0	7–0	UEFA Euro 2024 qualifying
2	24	10 October 2025	Laugardalsvöllur, Reykjavík, Iceland	Ukraine	1–1	3–5	2026 FIFA World Cup qualification
3	34	3 October 2026	Laugardalsvöllur, Reykjavík, Iceland	Bulgaria	3–0	3–0	2026–27 UEFA Nations League C
4	36	16 November 2026	Laugardalsvöllur, Reykjavík, Iceland	Luxembourg	3–0	3–0	2026–27 UEFA Nations League C

== Honours ==
Iceland

- Baltic Cup: 2022
