= Jay Idzes =

Indonesian footballer (born 2000)

- Idzes with Indonesia in 2025

Personal information
- Full name: Jay Noah Idzes
- Date of birth: 2 June 2000 (age 26)
- Place of birth: Mierlo, Netherlands
- Height: 1.90 m (6 ft 3 in)
- Position: Centre-back

Team information
- Current team: Sassuolo
- Number: 21

Youth career
- Mifano
- 2009–2014: PSV
- 2014–2016: VVV-Venlo
- 2016–2018: Eindhoven

Senior career*
Years	Team	Apps	(Gls)
2018–2020	Eindhoven	54	(0)
2020–2023	Go Ahead Eagles	84	(2)
2023–2025	Venezia	60	(4)
2025–	Sassuolo	41	(0)

International career^{‡}
2024–	Indonesia	18	(1)
Medal record
Men's football
Representing Indonesia
FIFA Series
Runner-up	2026 Indonesia
- * Club domestic league appearances and goals as of 22 November 2026 ‡ National team caps and goals as of 17:05, 30 March 2026 (UTC)

Jay Noah Idzes (born 2 June 2000) is a professional footballer who plays as a centre-back for Serie A club Sassuolo. Born in the Netherlands, he captains the Indonesia national team.

After representing various youth teams in the Netherlands, he began his career at Eerste Divisie club FC Eindhoven before moving to another Dutch club, Go Ahead Eagles, where he helped the team to promotion to the Eredivisie and spent two seasons in the top division. In the summer of 2023, Idzes moved to Italian club Venezia, achieving the promotion to the top-flight in his debut season. After two seasons at Venezia, he joined the recently promoted Serie A side Sassuolo in August 2025.

Dutch by birth, he opted to represent Indonesia at the international level since 2023, having qualified for the country through his Indonesian-born maternal grandfather. He made his international debut in March 2024.

== Club career ==
=== Eindhoven ===
Born in Mierlo, Idzes made his Eerste Divisie debut for Eindhoven on 28 April 2018 in a game against TOP Oss, as an 89th-minute substitute for Hervé Matthys.

=== Go Ahead Eagles ===
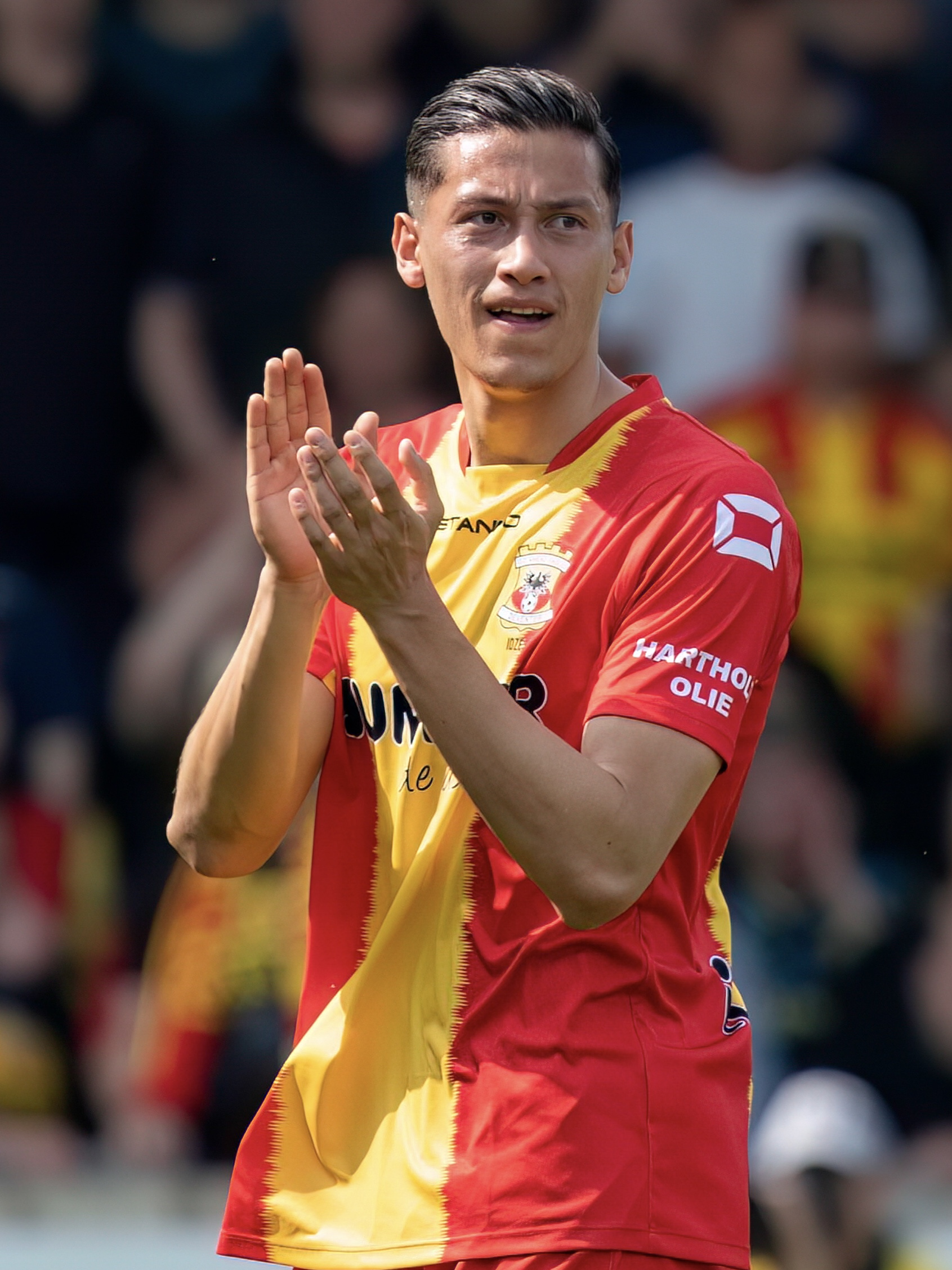
Idzes playing for Go Ahead Eagles in 2023

On 20 July 2020, Idzes moved to Go Ahead Eagles after a drawn out transfer saga, where his new club initially thought that his contract with Eindhoven had expired, but eventually agreed to pay an undisclosed fee.

=== Venezia ===
==== 2023–24: Debut season ====
On 30 June 2023, Idzes signed a four-year contract with Serie B club Venezia.

On 1 May 2024, Idzes scored his first two goals for Venezia against U.S. Catanzaro.

Idzes finished the season with 30 appearances and 3 goals in all competitions, as he led Venezia to promotion to Serie A via the play-offs, following a 1–0 win over Cremonese in the second leg.

==== 2024–25 ====
On 25 August 2024, Idzes made his Serie A debut against Fiorentina in a goalless draw, becoming the first Indonesian to play in the Italian top-flight.

On 14 December 2024, Idzes scored his first top flight goal for Venezia against Juventus in a 2–2 draw, becoming the first-ever Indonesian and Southeast Asian player to score a goal in the Serie A history.

=== Sassuolo ===
On 9 August 2025, recently promoted Serie A club Sassuolo announced the signing of Idzes for €8 million plus €500k add ons, with a contract until June 2029.

On 29 August 2025, Idzes made his debut for Sassuolo against Cremonese.

== International career ==
Idzes was selected for the Netherlands futsal U17 team and also played for the Netherlands futsal U18.

In September 2023, Idzes confirmed that he had decided to represent Indonesia at international level. On 28 December 2023, he was granted Indonesian citizenship officially, thus becoming eligible to play for the national team.

However, he was not available at the 2023 AFC Asian Cup squads due to squad registration being closed.

On 7 March 2024, Idzes received a call up to the Indonesia national team for the 2026 FIFA World Cup qualification match against Vietnam on 21 and 26 March 2024. On 21 March 2024, he made his international debut for Indonesia in a 1–0 win against Vietnam. Idzes would go on to score his first international goal in the return leg, a 3–0 away victory against Vietnam on 26 March 2024.

Starting from the third round of World Cup qualification, Idzes regularly became the captain of the team.

On 24 December 2025, he matched Mees Hilgers record for the most expensive Indonesian Player by transfer market value.

== Personal life ==
Born in the Netherlands, Idzes is of Indonesian descent.

On 28 December 2023, Idzes officially obtained Indonesian citizenship.

== Career statistics ==
=== Club ===
As of match played 22 November 2026

Appearances and goals by club, season and competition
Club	Season	League			National cup (Note: Includes KNVB Cup, Coppa Italia)		Other		Total	
Club	Season	Division	Apps	Goals	Apps	Goals	Apps	Goals	Apps	Goals
Eindhoven	2017–18	Eerste Divisie	1	0	0	0	–		1	0
Eindhoven	2018–19	Eerste Divisie	33	0	1	0	–		34	0
Eindhoven	2019–20	Eerste Divisie	20	0	2	0	–		22	0
Eindhoven	Total		54	0	3	0	0	0	57	0
Go Ahead Eagles	2020–21	Eerste Divisie	31	1	2	0	–		33	1
Go Ahead Eagles	2021–22	Eredivisie	21	0	4	0	–		25	0
Go Ahead Eagles	2022–23	Eredivisie	32	1	3	1	–		35	2
Go Ahead Eagles	Total		84	2	9	1	0	0	93	3
Venezia	2023–24	Serie B	25	3	1	0	4 (Note: Appearances in Serie A promotion play-offs)	0	30	3
Venezia	2024–25	Serie A	35	1	1	1	–		36	2
Venezia	Total		60	4	2	1	4	0	66	5
Sassuolo	2025–26	Serie A	35	0	0	0	–		35	0
Sassuolo	2026–27	Serie A	6	0	0	0	–		6	0
Sassuolo	Total		41	0	0	0	0	0	41	0
Career total			238	6	14	2	4	0	256	8

=== International ===
As of match played 30 March 2026

Appearances and goals by national team and year
National team	Year	Apps	Goals
Indonesia	2024	9	1
Indonesia	2025	7	0
Indonesia	2026	2	0
Total		18	1

As of match played 26 March 2024
Indonesia score listed first, score column indicates score after each Idzes goal

List of international goals scored by Jay Idzes
No.	Date	Venue	Cap	Opponent	Score	Result	Competition
1	26 March 2024	Mỹ Đình National Stadium, Hanoi, Vietnam	2	Vietnam	1–0	3–0	2026 FIFA World Cup qualification

== Honours ==
Venezia

- Serie B Promotion play-offs: 2023–24

Indonesia

- FIFA Series runner-up: 2026

Individual

- PSSI Awards Men's Player of the Year: 2026

== See also ==
- List of Indonesia international footballers born outside Indonesia

Preceded by Asnawi Mangkualam	Indonesian Captain; 2024–present	Succeeded by
