= Alessandro Marcandalli =

Italian footballer (born 2002)

Personal information
- Date of birth: 25 October 2002 (age 24)
- Place of birth: Ponte San Pietro, Italy
- Height: 1.95 m (6 ft 5 in)
- Position: Centre-back

Team information
- Current team: Genoa
- Number: 27

Youth career
- 2009–2017: Atalanta
- 2017–2020: Giana Erminio

Senior career*
Years	Team	Apps	(Gls)
2020–2021	Giana Erminio	2	(0)
2021	→ Genoa (loan)	0	(0)
2021–	Genoa	34	(0)
2022–2023	→ Pontedera (loan)	24	(1)
2023–2024	→ Reggiana (loan)	35	(1)
2025	→ Venezia (loan)	8	(0)

International career^{‡}
2023–2024	Italy U20	2	(0)
- * Club domestic league appearances and goals as of 25 May 2026 ‡ National team caps and goals as of 12:44, 21 August 2024 (UTC)

Alessandro Marcandalli (born 25 October 2002) is an Italian professional footballer who plays as a centre-back for Serie A club Genoa.

== Club career ==
Marcandalli started playing football with the youth academy of Atalanta before joining Giana Erminio at 15. He made his senior and professional debut with Giana Erminio in a 3–0 Serie C loss to Livono on 11 November 2020 at the age of 18. On 20 January 2021, he joined Genoa on loan for the second half of the 2020–21 season and was assigned to their U19 side.

In the summer of 2021, he permanently transferred to Genoa on a contract until 2026. On 28 July 2022, he joined Pontedera on a season-long loan in the Serie C. On 6 July 2023, he joined Reggiana on a season-long loan in the Serie B where he became an undisputed starter. In the summer of 2024, he was promoted to Genoa's senior team in preparation for the season in the Serie A. He made his Serie A debut for Genoa on 19 October 2024 in a 2–2 draw against Bologna, he started the game and was substituted at half-time.

On 28 January 2025, Marcandalli was loaned by Venezia until the end of the season.

== International career ==
Marcandalli was born in Italy to an Italian father and a Nigerian mother. He was called up to the Italy U20s in November 2023.
