= Antonio Candela =

Italian footballer (born 2000)

Personal information
- Full name: Antonio Candela
- Date of birth: 27 April 2000 (age 26)
- Place of birth: La Spezia, Italy
- Height: 1.86 m (6 ft 1 in)
- Position: Right back

Team information
- Current team: Catanzaro (on loan from Spezia)
- Number: 27

Youth career
- 2011–2018: Spezia
- 2018–2019: Genoa

Senior career*
| Years | Team | Apps | (Gls) |
| 2017–2018 | Spezia | 0 | (0) |
| 2019–2022 | Genoa | 0 | (0) |
| 2019–2020 | → Trapani (loan) | 7 | (0) |
| 2020 | → Olbia (loan) | 4 | (0) |
| 2020–2021 | → Pergolettese (loan) | 30 | (0) |
| 2021–2022 | → Cesena (loan) | 27 | (4) |
| 2022–2026 | Venezia | 79 | (2) |
| 2025 | → Valladolid (loan) | 12 | (0) |
| 2025–2026 | → Spezia (loan) | 17 | (0) |
| 2026– | Spezia | 0 | (0) |
| 2026 | → Empoli (loan) | 16 | (0) |
| 2026– | → Catanzaro (loan) | 0 | (0) |

International career
| 2016 | Italy U16 | 4 | (0) |
| 2016–2017 | Italy U17 | 18 | (0) |
| 2017–2019 | Italy U19 | 25 | (1) |
| 2019 | Italy U20 | 3 | (0) |
Medal record
Men's football
Representing Italy
UEFA European Under-19 Championship
| Runner-up | 2018 |
- * Club domestic league appearances and goals as of 13 May 2026

Antonio Candela (born 27 April 2000) is an Italian professional footballer who plays as defender for Serie B club Catanzaro, on loan from Spezia.

== Career ==
On 5 August 2017, Candela made his professional debut with Spezia Calcio against Serie C club Reggiana in the Coppa Italia.

On 31 July 2019, Candela joined Serie B club Trapani on loan until 30 June 2020. On 31 January 2020, he moved on loan to Serie C club Olbia.

On 3 September 2020 he moved on loan to Pergolettese. On 24 July 2021, he was loaned to Cesena.

On 25 August 2022, Genoa and Venezia reached an agreement under which Candela and cash moved to Venezia in exchange for Mattia Aramu moving in the opposite direction. Candela signed a three-year agreement with Venezia, with an option to extend.

On 3 February 2025, Candela was loaned to Spanish side Valladolid for the remainder of the 2024–25 season.

On 16 August 2025, he returned to Spezia on loan with an obligation to buy.

On 30 January 2026, Spezia made the transfer permanent and at the same time loaned Candela out to Empoli until 30 June 2026, with an option to buy.

On 24 July 2026, Candela was loaned by Catanzaro, with an option to buy. He signed a contract with Catanzaro until 2030 that would be in place if the option is exercised.

== Honours ==
Italy U19

- UEFA European Under-19 Championship runner-up: 2018
