= Nunzio Lella =

Italian footballer

Personal information
- Date of birth: 28 July 2000 (age 26)
- Place of birth: Santeramo in Colle, Italy
- Height: 1.88 m (6 ft 2 in)
- Position: Midfielder

Team information
- Current team: Hellas Verona
- Number: 23

Youth career
- –2018: Bari
- 2018–2019: Cagliari

Senior career*
Years	Team	Apps	(Gls)
2018–2023	Cagliari	18	(1)
2019–2022	→ Olbia (loan)	94	(7)
2023–2026	Venezia	39	(0)
2024–2025	→ Bari (loan)	25	(2)
2026–	Hellas Verona	0	(0)
- * Club domestic league appearances and goals as of 23 August 2026

Nunzio Lella (born 28 July 2000) is an Italian professional footballer who plays as a midfielder for Serie B club Hellas Verona.

== Club career ==
=== Bari ===
He is a product of youth teams of Bari. In 2016–17 and 2017–18 seasons, he was occasionally called up to the senior squad but didn't see time on the field.

=== Cagliari ===
Following Bari's bankruptcy, on 3 August 2018 he joined Serie A club Cagliari. He mostly spent the 2018–19 season with their Under-19 squad. He was called up to the senior squad 5 times, but didn't make any appearances.

==== Loan to Olbia ====
On 17 July 2019 he joined Serie C club Olbia on a season-long loan.

He made his professional Serie C debut for Olbia on 25 August 2019 in a game against Siena. He started the game and was substituted after 65 minutes.

The loan was renewed for the 2020–21 season on 28 August 2020.

On 12 August 2021, he extended his contract for Cagliari until 2024; on the same day he returned to Olbia, once again on loan.

=== Venezia ===
On 25 August 2023, he joined Venezia on a three-year contract.

==== Return to Bari ====
On 29 August 2024, Lella returned to Bari on loan with an option to buy.

Hellas Verona

On 19 August 2026, Lella joined Hellas Verona on a contract lasting until 2028.
