= Filippo Neri (footballer) =

Italian footballer

Personal information
- Date of birth: 4 December 2002 (age 23)
- Place of birth: Pisa, Italy
- Height: 1.88 m (6 ft 2 in)
- Position: Goalkeeper

Team information
- Current team: Venezia

Youth career
- –2020: Livorno

Senior career*
Years	Team	Apps	(Gls)
2020–2021	Livorno	11	(0)
2021–	Venezia	0	(0)
2022–2023	→ Feralpisalò (loan)	0	(0)
2023–2024	→ Vis Pesaro (loan)	26	(0)
2025	→ Campobasso (loan)	10	(0)
2025–	→ Triestina (loan)	2	(0)
- * Club domestic league appearances and goals as of 27 April 2026

Filippo Neri (born 4 December 2002) is an Italian professional footballer who plays as a goalkeeper for Serie A club Venezia.

== Career ==
On 26 August 2021 he signed a three-year contract for Venezia. On 30 August 2022, Neri was loaned to Feralpisalò. The loan to Feralpisalò was terminated on 19 January 2023. On 2 August 2023, Neri was loaned to Vis Pesaro. On 9 January 2025, he moved on a new Serie C loan to Campobasso.

== Club statistics ==
=== Club ===
As of 2 May 2021.

Club	Season	League			Cup		Other		Total	
Club	Season	Division	Apps	Goals	Apps	Goals	Apps	Goals	Apps	Goals
Livorno	2019–20	Serie B	2	0	0	0	–		2	0
Livorno	2020–21	Serie C	9	0	1	0	–		10	0
Livorno	Total		11	0	1	0	—		12	0
Venezia	2021–22	Serie A	0	0	0	0	–		0	0
Venezia	2022–23	Serie B	0	0	0	0	–		0	0
Venezia	Total		0	0	0	0	—		0	0
Feralpisalò (loan)	2022–23	Serie C	0	0	0	0	–		0	0
Career total			11	0	1	0	0	0	12	0
