= Marin Šverko =

Croatian professional footballer (born 1998)

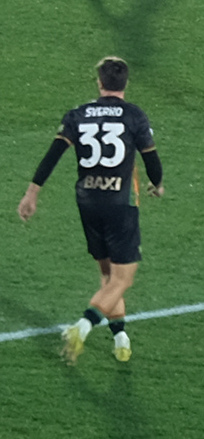
- Šverko in 2025 with Venezia

Personal information
- Date of birth: 4 February 1998 (age 28)
- Place of birth: Pforzheim, Germany
- Height: 1.87 m (6 ft 2 in)
- Position: Left-back

Team information
- Current team: Venezia
- Number: 33

Youth career
- –2010: FC Kieselbronn
- 2010–2016: Karlsruher SC

Senior career*
Years	Team	Apps	(Gls)
2016–2017	Karlsruher SC II	6	(0)
2016–2017	Karlsruher SC	2	(0)
2017–2020	Mainz 05 II	39	(1)
2017–2020	Mainz 05	0	(0)
2018–2019	→ Karlsruher SC (loan)	2	(0)
2020	→ Sonnenhof Großaspach (loan)	8	(0)
2020–2021	1. FC Saarbrücken	24	(1)
2021–2023	Groningen	29	(0)
2023	→ Venezia (loan)	4	(0)
2023–	Venezia	74	(1)

International career^{‡}
2015	Croatia U17	3	(0)
2015–2016	Croatia U18	5	(0)
2016–2017	Croatia U19	7	(0)
2018	Croatia U20	1	(0)
2019–2021	Croatia U21	11	(1)
- * Club domestic league appearances and goals as of 12 May 2026 ‡ National team caps and goals as of 18 June 2021

Marin Šverko (born 4 February 1998) is a Croatian professional footballer who plays as a left-back for Serie A club Venezia.

== Club career ==
Šverko went through the youth ranks of Karlsruher SC. On 27 November 2016, the 14th matchday of the 2016–17 season, he made his debut on the first team of Karlsruher SC in a 0–0 game against 1. FC Kaiserslautern.

In January 2017, Šverko moved to Mainz 05 on a deal until 2021. On 25 February 2017, he made his debut for Mainz' reserve team in the 3. Liga in a 3–1 win against Preußen Münster. After four more games for Mainz II, Šverko and the team was relegated to the Regionalliga.

For the 2018–19 season, Šverko returned to Karlsruher SC on loan. At the beginning of the season he was injured and therefore lost the competition for the position of the left back against Damian Roßbach. Therefore, he made only two league appearances since his return. His loan was not extended, so he returned to Mainz and played another 15 games in the first half of the 2019–20 Regionalliga season. On 21 January 2020, he was loaned out to 3. Liga team SG Sonnenhof Großaspach until the end of the season.

In August 2020, he moved to 3. Liga club 1. FC Saarbrücken on a deal until June 2022.

On 31 January 2023, Šverko joined Venezia in Serie B on loan until the end of the 2022–23 season. On 7 July 2023, Venezia made the transfer permanent and signed a three-year contract with Šverko.
