= 2026–27 Venezia FC season =

Venezia FC
2026–27 season
- Owner: VFC Newco 2023 LLC
- President: Francesca Bodie
- Manager: Giovanni Stroppa
- Stadium: Stadio Pier Luigi Penzo
- Serie A: 20th
- Coppa Italia: Second round
- Top goalscorer: League: Akor Adams; Antoine Hainaut; Richie Sagrado; John Yeboah (1 each); All: Akor Adams (3)
- Highest home attendance: 11,723 vs Fiorentina; 11 September 2026, Serie A
- Lowest home attendance: 11,016 vs Lecce; 23 August 2026, Serie A
- Biggest win: 3–2 vs Modena (H); 15 August 2026, Coppa Italia
- Biggest defeat: 0–2 vs Lecce (H); 23 August 2026, Serie A 2–0 vs Milan (A); 28 August 2026, Serie A 2–4 vs Fiorentina (H); 11 September 2026, Serie A
Home colours	Away colours	Third colours

The 2026–27 season is the 120th season in the history of Venezia F.C. and its first season back in the Italian top flight after a one-season absence. The club is also competing in the Coppa Italia. This is the second consecutive season under coach Giovanni Stroppa.

== Players ==
=== Current squad ===
As of 8 September 2026

Note: Flags indicate national team as defined under FIFA eligibility rules; some limited exceptions apply. Players may hold more than one non-FIFA nationality.

No.	Pos.	Nation	Player
1	GK	SRB	Filip Stanković
2	DF	ARG	Matías Moreno (on loan from Fiorentina)
3	DF	BEL	Joël Schingtienne
4	DF	CRO	Bartol Franjić
5	DF	SUR	Ridgeciano Haps
6	MF	USA	Gianluca Busio (captain)
7	FW	KOS	Albion Rrahmani
8	MF	ESP	Lamine Fanne
9	FW	ITA	Andrea Adorante
10	FW	ECU	John Yeboah
14	DF	POR	Thierry Correia
15	DF	BRA	Juan Jesus
16	DF	GHA	Rufai Mohammed
17	DF	GER	Armel Bella-Kotchap
18	DF	FRA	Antoine Hainaut
19	MF	SUI	Simon Sohm (on loan from Fiorentina)
20	DF	BEL	Richie Sagrado
21	MF	ISL	Þórir Jóhann Helgason

No.	Pos.	Nation	Player
23	GK	ITA	Matteo Grandi
25	DF	MAR	Redouane Halhal
26	MF	CRO	Toma Bašić
28	GK	ITA	Alessio Pozzi
29	FW	GER	Lion Lauberbach
30	MF	ITA	Matteo Dagasso
32	MF	GHA	Alfred Duncan
33	DF	CRO	Marin Šverko
36	MF	ITA	Lorenzo Berardi
45	FW	NGR	Akor Adams
55	MF	ITA	Simone Panada
56	MF	POL	Kornel Lisman
70	DF	ITA	Pasquale Mazzocchi (on loan from Napoli)
71	MF	ESP	Kike Pérez
77	MF	ESP	Toni Fernández
95	DF	ESP	Ale Gomes
96	GK	ITA	Lorenzo Montipò

=== Out on loan ===
As of 8 September 2026

Note: Flags indicate national team as defined under FIFA eligibility rules; some limited exceptions apply. Players may hold more than one non-FIFA nationality.

No.	Pos.	Nation	Player
—	GK	ITA	Alessandro Plizzari (on loan to Südtirol until 30 June 2027)
—	DF	LUX	Seid Korać (on loan to Hellas Verona until 30 June 2027)
—	DF	SUI	Calixte Ligue (on loan to Rijeka until 30 June 2027)
—	DF	FRA	Ahmed Sidibé (on loan to Vitória de Guimarães until 30 June 2027)
—	DF	ITA	Michael Venturi (on loan to Avellino until 30 June 2027)
—	MF	ITA	Nicolò Berengo (on loan to Vis Pesaro until 30 June 2027)
—	MF	NOR	Emil Bohinen (on loan to Cesena until 30 June 2027)
—	MF	ITA	Mattia Compagnon (on loan to Hellas Verona until 30 June 2027)
—	MF	ITA	Edoardo Mariani (on loan to Vis Pesaro until 30 June 2027)

No.	Pos.	Nation	Player
—	MF	ITA	Federico Tavernaro (on loan to Vis Pesaro until 30 June 2027)
—	FW	MLT	Kevin Cannavò (on loan to Spezia until 30 June 2027)
—	FW	ESP	Antonio Casas (on loan to Sporting de Gijón until 30 June 2027)
—	FW	MAR	Saad El Haddad (on loan to Rudeš until 30 June 2027)
—	FW	CZE	Daniel Fila (on loan to Avellino until 30 June 2027)
—	FW	ITA	Marco Ladisa (on loan to Trento until 30 June 2027)
—	FW	ITA	Alvin Okoro (on loan to Südtirol until 30 June 2027)
—	FW	ITA	Gaetano Oristanio (on loan to Torino until 30 June 2027)

== Transfers ==
=== Summer window ===
==== In ====
Date	Pos.	Player	From	Fee	Notes	Ref.
29 June 2026	FW	(Poland) Kornel Lisman	(Poland) Lech Poznań	€2,500,000		
1 July 2026	DF	(Croatia) Toma Bašić	(Italy) Lazio	Free		
1 July 2026	DF	(Germany) Armel Bella-Kotchap	(Italy) Hellas Verona	€7,000,000	+ €3,000,000 in add-ons	
1 July 2026	DF	(Croatia) Bartol Franjić	(Germany) VfL Wolfsburg	€1,250,000	From loan to definitive purchase	
1 July 2026	MF	(Italy) Lorenzo Berardi	(Italy) Pescara	€1,000,000		
1 July 2026	MF	(Italy) Mattia Compagnon	(Italy) Juventus Next Gen	€1,000,000	From loan to definitive purchase	
1 July 2026	MF	(Iceland) Þórir Jóhann Helgason	(Italy) Lecce	Free		
2 July 2026	DF	(Portugal) Thierry Correia	(Spain) Valencia	Free		
9 July 2026	DF	(Spain) Ale Gomes	(Spain) Real Zaragoza	€2,000,000		
9 July 2026	FW	(Kosovo) Albion Rrahmani	(Czech Republic) Sparta Prague	€7,500,000	+ €2,000,000 in add-ons	
11 July 2026	GK	(Italy) Alessio Pozzi	(Italy) Vis Pesaro	Undisclosed		
17 July 2026	FW	(Italy) Federico Tavernaro	(Italy) Vis Pesaro	Free		
22 July 2026	FW	(Nigeria) Akor Adams	(Spain) Sevilla	€16,000,000	+ €6,000,000 in add-ons	
1 August 2026	DF	(Morocco) Redouane Halhal	(Belgium) Mechelen	€5,000,000		
19 August 2026	GK	(Italy) Lorenzo Montipò	(Italy) Hellas Verona	€250,000		
31 August 2026	DF	(Brazil) Juan Jesus	(Italy) Napoli	Free		

==== Loans in ====
Date	Pos.	Player	From	Fee	Notes	Ref.
30 July 2026	DF	(Argentina) Matías Moreno	(Italy) Fiorentina	€500,000	Obligation to buy for €5,500,000 under certain conditions	
2 August 2026	MF	(Switzerland) Simon Sohm	(Italy) Fiorentina	Free	Option to buy for €10,000,000	
31 August 2026	DF	(Italy) Pasquale Mazzocchi	(Italy) Napoli	€500,000	Obligation to buy for an undisclosed fee under certain conditions	
1 September 2026	DF	(Ghana) Rufai Mohammed	(Sweden) IF Elfsborg	Free	Option to buy for an undisclosed fee	
1 September 2026	MF	(Spain) Toni Fernández	(Spain) Barcelona	Free	Obligation to buy for an undisclosed fee under certain conditions, buy-back option for an undisclosed fee	

==== Loan returns ====
Date	Pos.	Player	From	Fee	Notes	Ref.
30 June 2026	GK	(Italy) Filippo Neri	(Italy) Triestina	Free		
14 August 2026	DF	(Italy) Giorgio Altare	(Italy) Pescara	Free		
30 June 2026	DF	(Italy) Lorenzo Busato	(Italy) Campodarsego	Free		
30 June 2026	DF	(Italy) Giovanni Di Renzo	(Italy) Vis Pesaro	Free		
30 June 2026	DF	(Switzerland) Calixte Ligue	(Italy) Mantova	Free		
30 June 2026	MF	(Guinea) Cheick Condé	(Austria) Blau-Weiß Linz	Free		
30 June 2026	MF	(Morocco) Saad El Haddad	(Italy) Pineto	Free		
30 June 2026	MF	(Spain) Lamine Fanne	(Italy) Pescara	Free		
30 June 2026	MF	(Italy) Simone Panada	(Italy) Atalanta Under-23	Free		
30 June 2026	FW	(Italy) Simone Ascione	(Italy) Triestina	Free		
30 June 2026	FW	(Malta) Kevin Cannavò	(Italy) Cosenza	Free		
30 June 2026	FW	(Czech Republic) Daniel Fila	(Italy) Empoli	Free		
30 June 2026	FW	(Italy) Marco Ladisa	(Italy) Trento	Free		
30 June 2026	FW	(Italy) Alvin Okoro	(Italy) Juve Stabia	Free		
30 June 2026	FW	(Italy) Gaetano Oristanio	(Italy) Parma	Free	Option to buy not exercised	

==== Out ====
Date	Pos.	Player	To	Fee	Notes	Ref.
30 June 2026	GK	(Italy) Filippo Neri	Unattached	Free		
1 July 2026	MF	(Italy) Issa Doumbia	(Portugal) Sporting CP	€20,530,000	+ €6,000,000 in add-ons	
1 July 2026	MF	(Italy) Hans Nicolussi Caviglia	(Italy) Parma	€6,000,000	From loan to definitive purchase	
2 July 2026	DF	(Austria) Michael Svoboda	(England) Brighton & Hove Albion	€5,000,000		
11 July 2026	GK	(Italy) Stefano Minelli	(Italy) Desenzano	Free		
17 July 2026	MF	(Italy) Lorenzo Busato	(Italy) Sandonà	Undisclosed	Contract solved by mutual consent	
21 July 2026	DF	(Italy) Giovanni Di Renzo	(Italy) Pineto	Undisclosed		
30 June 2026	MF	(Guinea) Cheick Condé	(Belgium) Beveren	Free	Contract solved by mutual consent	
7 August 2026	FW	(Italy) Simone Ascione	(Italy) Vis Pesaro	Undisclosed		
7 August 2026	MF	(Iceland) Bjarki Bjarkason	(Italy) Südtirol	Undisclosed		
14 August 2026	DF	(Italy) Giorgio Altare	(Italy) Pescara	Undisclosed		
18 August 2026	MF	(Italy) Nunzio Lella	(Italy) Hellas Verona	€250,000		
1 September 2026	FW	(Iraq) Marko Farji	(Netherlands) Heerenveen	Undisclosed		

==== Loans out ====
Date	Pos.	Player	To	Fee	Notes	Ref.
8 July 2026	FW	(Italy) Marco Ladisa	(Italy) Trento	Free		
9 July 2026	FW	(Italy) Gaetano Oristanio	(Italy) Torino	Free	Option to buy for €5,000,000	
10 July 2026	GK	(Italy) Alessandro Plizzari	(Italy) Südtirol	Free		
11 July 2026	DF	(Luxembourg) Seid Korać	(Italy) Hellas Verona	Free	Obligation to buy for €2,000,000 under certain conditions	
13 July 2026	FW	(Malta) Kevin Cannavò	(Italy) Spezia	Free	Obligation to buy for an undisclosed fee under certain conditions	
21 July 2026	FW	(Czech Republic) Daniel Fila	(Italy) Avellino	Free		
29 July 2026	MF	(Italy) Mattia Compagnon	(Italy) Hellas Verona	Free	Obligation to buy for an undisclosed fee under certain conditions	
5 August 2026	MF	(Italy) Federico Tavernaro	(Italy) Vis Pesaro	Free		
11 August 2026	DF	(France) Ahmed Sidibé	(Portugal) Vitória de Guimarães	Free	Option to buy for an undisclosed fee	
11 August 2026	DF	(Italy) Michael Venturi	(Italy) Avellino	Free	Option to buy for an undisclosed fee	
23 August 2026	FW	(Spain) Antonio Casas	(Spain) Sporting Gijón	Free	Option to buy for an undisclosed fee, obligation to buy for an undisclosed fee under certain conditions	
29 August 2026	FW	(Italy) Alvin Okoro	(Italy) Südtirol	Free		
30 August 2026	MF	(Norway) Emil Bohinen	(Italy) Cesena	Free		

==== Loan returns ====
Date	Pos.	Player	To	Fee	Notes	Ref.
8 August 2026	MF	(Italy) Alessandro Pietrelli	(Italy) Juventus Next Gen	Free	Option to buy not exercised	

== Friendlies ==
19 July 2026	Venezia	4–2	Dolomiti Bellunesi
17:30

23 July 2026	Venezia	8–0	Vis Pesaro
17:30

27 July 2026	Galatasaray	0–3	Venezia
20:00

1 August 2026	Saint-Étienne	4–3	Venezia
17:00

8 August 2026	Stade Brestois 29	2–2	Venezia
18:30

== Competitions ==
=== Serie A ===
Pos	Team	Pld	W	D	L	GF	GA	GD	Pts	Qualification or relegation
16	Monza	10	2	1	7	17	24	−7	7	
17	Fiorentina	9	1	2	6	11	21	−10	5	
18	Parma	9	1	2	6	5	15	−10	5	Relegation to Serie B
19	Udinese	10	1	2	7	11	23	−12	5	Relegation to Serie B
20	Venezia	10	1	0	9	6	20	−14	3	Relegation to Serie B

Updated to match(es) played on 1 November 2026. Source: Serie A
Rules for classification: 1) Points; 2) Head-to-head points; 3) Head-to-head goal difference; 4) Goal difference; 5) Goals scored; 6) Drawing of lots.
End-of-season ties on points for 1st or 17th are instead decided by a one- or two-leg play-off, respectively, unless the play-off would involve a UEFA competition finalist (in which case rules 2–6 apply). Rules 2–6 determine home advantage (for 17th, the better-ranked team hosts the second leg); if three or more teams are tied, they also select the two play-off teams.

==== Results by round ====
Round	1	2
Ground	H	A
Result	L	L
Position		

Updated to match(es) played on 28 August 2026. Source:
A = Away; H = Home; W = Win; D = Draw; L = Loss

==== Matches ====
23 August 2026 1	Venezia	0–2	Lecce	Venice
18:30

28 August 2026 2	Milan	2–0	Venezia	Milan
20:45				Stadium: San Siro

=== Coppa Italia ===
15 August 2026 Round of 32	Venezia	3–2	Modena	Venice
20:45	Adams 26', 85'; Yeboah 83'		Ambrosino 17', 39'

2 September 2026 Second round	Udinese	2–1	Venezia	Udine
18:00				Stadium: Stadio Friuli; Referee: Matteo Marchetti
