= 2025–26 Venezia FC season =

Venezia
2025–26 season
- Chairman: Duncan L. Niederauer
- Head coach: Giovanni Stroppa
- Stadium: Stadio Pier Luigi Penzo
- Serie B: 1st (promoted)
- Coppa Italia: Round of 16
- Top goalscorer: League: Andrea Adorante (17); All: Andrea Adorante (17)
- Average home league attendance: 9,215
Home colours	Away colours	Third colours

The 2025–26 season was the 119th season in the history of Venezia Football Club, and the club's first season back in Serie B following relegation from the top division. In addition to competing in the domestic league, Venezia also participated in the Coppa Italia.

== Transfers ==
=== Transfers In ===
Pos.	Player	Transferred from	Fee	Date	Source
FW	(Netherlands) Jay Enem	(Cyprus) PAC Omonia 29M	Loan return	30 June 2025	
FW	(Italy) Alvin Okoro	(Italy) Vis Pesaro	Loan return	30 June 2025	
GK	(Italy) Filippo Neri	(Italy) Campobasso	Loan return	30 June 2025	
MF	(Portugal) Afonso Peixoto	(Italy) Vis Pesaro	Loan return	30 June 2025	
DF	(Italy) Michael Venturi	(Italy) Cosenza	€300,000	13 August 2025	
MF	(Italy) Alessandro Pietrelli	(Italy) Juventus Next Gen	Loan	14 August 2025	
MF	(France) Antoine Hainaut	(Italy) Parma	Undisclosed	15 August 2025	
DF	(France) Ahmed Sidibé	(Slovenia) FC Koper	€1,000,000	27 August 2025	
MF	(Norway) Emil Bohinen	(Italy) Genoa	Loan	1 September 2025	

=== Transfers out ===
Pos.	Player	Transferred to	Fee	Date	Source
FW	(Netherlands) Jay Enem	(Serbia) OFK Beograd	Undisclosed	25 July 2025	
MF	(United States) Jack De Vries	(Netherlands) Den Bosch	Undisclosed	2 August 2025	
MF	(Portugal) Afonso Peixoto	(Portugal) Torreense	Undisclosed	7 August 2025	
DF	(Indonesia) Jay Idzes	(Italy) Sassuolo	€8,000,000	9 August 2025	
DF	(Guinea-Bissau) Fali Candé	(Italy) Sassuolo	€3,000,000	10 August 2025	
MF	(Italy) Kevin Cannavò	(Italy) Cosenza	Loan	15 August 2025	
FW	(Italy) Alvin Okoro	(Italy) Juventus Next Gen	Loan fee: €250k	15 August 2025	
DF	(Italy) Antonio Candela	(Italy) Spezia	Loan	16 August 2025	
FW	(United States) Andrija Novakovich	(Italy) Reggiana		21 August 2025	
GK	(Finland) Jesse Joronen	(Italy) Palermo FC		21 August 2025	
FW	(Italy) Gaetano Oristanio	(Italy) Parma	Loan	28 August 2025	
MF	(Italy) Federico Tavernaro	(Italy) Vis Pesaro	€100,000	28 August 2025	
GK	(Italy) Filippo Neri	(Italy) Venezia	Loan	1 September 2025	
DF	(Italy) Lorenzo Busato	(Italy) Club Milano	Loan	1 September 2025	
FW	(Senegal) Babacar Diop	(Italy) Crema	Free	1 September 2025	

== Friendlies ==
19 July 2025	Venezia	8–0	Real Vicenza

23 July 2025	Venezia	4–2	Dolomiti Bellunesi	Falcade
	Adorante 9'; Korać 24'; Yeboah 59', 71'	Report	Olonisakin 73', 77'	Attendance: 1,000; Referee: Mazzer

27 July 2025	Venezia	5–0	Torres	Longarone
17:30				Stadium: Stadio comunale di Longarone

2 August 2025	Beerschot (Belgium)	1–1	Venezia

6 August 2025	Lille (France)	3–0	Venezia

9 August 2025	Tubize-Braine (Belgium)	2–2	Venezia

5 September 2025	Rapid Wien (Austria)	1–1	Venezia	Vienna, Austria
18:00 UTC+2	Weixelbraun 33'	Report	Lella 9'	Stadium: Allianz Stadion; Referee: Safak Barmaksiz

== Competitions ==
=== Overall record ===
Competition	First match	Last match	Starting round	Record							
Competition	First match	Last match	Starting round	Pld	W	D	L	GF	GA	GD	Win %
Serie B	24 August 2025	8-10 May 2026	Matchday 1	4	1	2	1	5	5	+0	25.00
Coppa Italia	16 August 2025			1	1	0	0	4	0	+4	100.00
Total				5	2	2	1	9	5	+4	40.00

Last updated: 20 September 2025
Source: Competitions

=== Serie B ===
==== League table ====
Pos	Team	Pld	W	D	L	GF	GA	GD	Pts	Promotion, qualification or relegation
1	Venezia (C, P)	38	24	10	4	77	31	+46	82	Promotion to Serie A
2	Frosinone (P)	38	23	12	3	76	34	+42	81	Promotion to Serie A
3	Monza (O, P)	38	22	10	6	61	32	+29	76	Qualification for promotion play-offs semi-finals
4	Palermo	38	20	12	6	61	33	+28	72	Qualification for promotion play-offs semi-finals
5	Catanzaro	38	15	14	9	62	51	+11	59	Qualification for promotion play-offs preliminary round

Source: Serie BKT
Rules for classification: 1) Points; 2) Head-to-head points; 3) Head-to-head goal difference; 4) Goal difference; 5) Goals scored; 6) Draw.
(Note: Head-to-head record is used only after all the matches between the teams in question have been played)
(C) Champions; (O) Play-off winners; (P) Promoted

==== Results summary ====
Overall								Home						Away					
Pld	W	D	L	GF	GA	GD	Pts	W	D	L	GF	GA	GD	W	D	L	GF	GA	GD
38	24	10	4	84	31	+53	82	17	0	2	40	12	+28	7	10	2	44	19	+25

==== Results by round ====
Round	1	2	3	4
Ground	H	A	A	H
Result	W	D	D	L
Position	6	6	6	

Updated to match(es) played on 20 September 2025. Source:
A = Away; H = Home; W = Win; D = Draw; L = Loss

==== Matches ====
24 August 2025 1	Venezia	2–1	Bari	Venice
19:00 UTC+2	Bjarkason 9'; Duncan 43'; Korać (yellow card) 52'		Dorval 26'; Rao (yellow card) 72'	Stadium: Stadio Pier Luigi Penzo; Attendance: 8,300; Referee: Davide Di Marco

30 August 2025 2	Juve Stabia	0–0	Venezia	Castellammare di Stabia
19:00 UTC+2	Burnete (yellow card) 16'; Cacciamani (yellow card) 75'		Yeboah (red card) 37'; Doumbia (yellow card) 45+1'	Stadium: Stadio Romeo Menti; Attendance: 3,943; Referee: Daniele Perenzoni

13 September 2025 3	Pescara	2–2	Venezia	Pescara
15:00 UTC+2	Desplanches (yellow card) 67'; Olzer 79'; Di Nardo 90+1'		Adorante 20'; Fila 66'; Haps (yellow card) 90+5'	Stadium: Stadio Adriatico – Giovanni Cornacchia; Attendance: 8,076; Referee: Federico Dionisi

20 September 2025 4	Venezia	1–2	Cesena	Venice
15:00 UTC+2	Busio (yellow card) 63', (goal) 83' (pen.); Šverko (yellow card) 90+1'; Duncan (red card) 90+3'; Doumbia (yellow card) 90+9'		Castagnetti (yellow card) 25'; Ciervo 54'; Mangraviti 72'; Bisoli (yellow card) 90+8'	Stadium: Stadio Pier Luigi Penzo; Attendance: 8,191; Referee: Matteo Marchetti

27 September 2025 5	Venezia	2–0	Spezia	Venice
16:00 UTC+2	Pérez (yellow card) 9'; Adorante 29' (pen.); Korać 54'		Vignali (red card) 8'; Hristov (yellow card) 66'; Cassata (yellow card) 89'	Stadium: Stadio Pier Luigi Penzo; Attendance: 7,126; Referee: Michael Fabbri

30 September 2025 6	Palermo	0–0	Venezia	Palermo
21:30 UTC+2	Pierozzi (yellow card) 15'; Augello (yellow card) 31'; Bani (yellow card) 37'; Ceccaroni (yellow card) 49' (red card) 90+2'	Report	Doumbia (yellow card) 33'; Busio (yellow card) 86'	Stadium: Stadio Renzo Barbera; Attendance: 31,933; Referee: Livio Marinelli

4 October 2025 7	Venezia	3–0	Frosinone	Venice
16:00 UTC+2	Compagnon 3'; Yeboah 16'; Šverko (yellow card) 35'; Busio (yellow card) 41'; Casas 53', (yellow card) 70'		Palmisani (yellow card) 15'; Lhassine Kone (yellow card) 32'; Monterisi (yellow card) 70'; Cichella (yellow card) 84'	Stadium: Stadio Pier Luigi Penzo; Attendance: 7,526; Referee: Juan Luca Sacchi

19 October 2025 8	Empoli	1–1	Venezia	Empoli
18:15 UTC+2	Shpendi 42'; Ilie (yellow card) 53'; Pellegri (yellow card) 60'; Obaretin (yellow card) 85'		Adorante 34'; Franjić (yellow card) 90+4'	Stadium: Stadio Carlo Castellani; Attendance: 6,640; Referee: Ivano Pezzuto

25 October 2025 9	Carrarese	3–2	Venezia	Carrara
18:15 UTC+2	Illanes (yellow card) 25'; Schiavi (yellow card) 31'; Abiuso (yellow card) 32'; Imperiale (yellow card) 34'; Zuelli 41'; Rubino 84'; Distefano 90+6', (yellow card) 90+7'		Adorante 13', (yellow card) 74'; Haps (yellow card) 22'; Busio (yellow card) 53'; Doumbia 63'; Pérez (yellow card) 66'	Stadium: Stadio dei Marmi; Attendance: 2,498; Referee: Mario Perri

29 October 2025 10	Venezia	3–0	Südtirol	Venice
21:30 UTC+2	Doumbia 39'; Pérez 45+2'; Adorante (yellow card) 61'; Yeboah 67'		Masiello (yellow card) 5'; Kofler (yellow card) 75'	Stadium: Stadio Pier Luigi Penzo; Attendance: 7,747; Referee: Ermanno Feliciani

2 November 2025 11	Catanzaro	2–1	Venezia	Catanzaro
16:00 UTC+2	Iemmello 54'; Nuamah (yellow card) 61'; Alesi 80'		Pérez (yellow card) 45'; Yeboah 59'; Svoboda (yellow card) 61'; Adorante (yellow card) 74'; Hainaut (yellow card) 86'	Stadium: Stadio Nicola Ceravolo; Attendance: 8,655; Referee: Daniele Perenzoni

8 November 2025 12	Venezia	3–1	Sampdoria	Venice
20:30 UTC+2	Busio 24'; Hainaut 34'; Haps (yellow card) 46'; Fila 77'		Henderson (yellow card) 21', (goal) 67'; Depaoli (yellow card) 31'; Ioannou (yellow card) 42'; Giordano (yellow card) 76'; Ferri (yellow card) 86'	Stadium: Stadio Pier Luigi Penzo; Attendance: 9,001; Referee: Claudio Giuseppe Allegretta

22 November 2025 13	Padova	0–2	Venezia	Padua
18:15 UTC+2	Seghetti (yellow card) 54'; Fusi (yellow card) 56'; Perrotta (yellow card) 79'		Busio 9'; Compagnon (yellow card) 37'; Pérez (yellow card) 51'; Yeboah 67' (pen.); Adorante (yellow card) 90+8'	Stadium: Stadio Euganeo; Attendance: 8,027; Referee: Fabio Maresca

29 November 2025 14	Venezia	3–0	Mantova	Venice
16:00 UTC+2	Hainaut 36'; Svoboda (yellow card) 42'; Adorante 57' (pen.), 60'; Schingtienne (yellow card) 67'		Bani (yellow card) 29'; Radaelli (yellow card) 45+1' (red card) 47'	Stadium: Stadio Pier Luigi Penzo; Attendance: 7,363; Referee: Ivano Pezzuto

8 December 2025 15	Avellino	1–1	Venezia	Avellino
16:00 UTC+2	Missori 41'; Cancellotti (yellow card) 90+5'		Yeboah (yellow card) 23'; Svoboda 51'; Haps (yellow card) 90+5'	Stadium: Stadio Partenio-Adriano Lombardi; Attendance: 9,583; Referee: Kevin Bonacina

13 December 2025 16	Venezia	2–0	Monza	Venice
16:00 UTC+2	Pérez (yellow card) 38', (goal) 49'; Adorante 56' (pen.)		Colombo (yellow card) 10'; Azzi (yellow card) 14'; Petagna (yellow card) 90+1'	Stadium: Stadio Pier Luigi Penzo; Attendance: 8,866; Referee: Simone Galipò

20 December 2025 17	Modena	1–2	Venezia	Modena
16:00 UTC+2	Santoro (yellow card) 66'; Di Mariano 90+4'		Yeboah 38'; Schingtienne (yellow card) 50'; Busio (yellow card) 63'; Hainaut (yellow card) 68'; Casas 74'	Stadium: Stadio Alberto Braglia; Attendance: 11,120; Referee: Giuseppe Mucera

27 December 2025 18	Venezia	1–0	Virtus Entella	Venice
16:00 UTC+2	Svoboda (yellow card) 2'; Yeboah 16'		Nichetti (yellow card) 30'; Vecchia (yellow card) 87'; Portanova (yellow card) 90'; Tiritiello (yellow card) 90+6'	Stadium: Stadio Pier Luigi Penzo; Attendance: 10,001; Referee: Davide Di Marco

10 January 2026 19	Reggiana	1–3	Venezia	Reggio Emilia
14:00 UTC+2	Girma 39', (yellow card) 45+4'		Adorante 21'; Yeboah 34' (pen.); Svoboda 57'; Schingtienne (red card) 69'; Venturi (yellow card) 90+5'	Stadium: Mapei Stadium – Città del Tricolore; Attendance: 8,124; Referee: Niccolò Turrini

17 January 2026 20	Venezia	3–1	Catanzaro	Venice
14:00 UTC+2	Busio 18'; Svoboda (yellow card) 50'; Adorante 86' (pen.); Casas 90+4'		D'Alessandro 6'; Pittarello (yellow card) 62'; Verrengia (red card) 73'; Antonini (yellow card) 84'; Cassandro (yellow card) 90+4'	Stadium: Stadio Pier Luigi Penzo; Attendance: 8,894; Referee: Giovanni Ayroldi

24 January 2026 21	Mantova	2–5	Venezia	Mantua
14:00 UTC+2	Marras 40'; Trimboli (yellow card) 45+1'; Wieser (yellow card) 55'; Mensah 81'		Adorante 25', 74'; Yeboah 33'; Venturi (yellow card) 53'; Doumbia 59'; Hainaut (yellow card) 64'; Chrisopoulos 90+3' (o.g.)	Stadium: Stadio Danilo Martelli; Attendance: 7,486; Referee: Marco Piccinini

31 January 2026 22	Venezia	2–1	Carrarese	Venice
14:00 UTC+2	Busio 25'; Yeboah (yellow card) 45+1'; Schingtienne 82'; Duncan (yellow card) 90+4'		Rubino (yellow card) 40'; Illanes (yellow card) 45+2'; Hasa 53'; Calabrese (yellow card) 77'; Oliana (yellow card) 90+3'	Stadium: Stadio Pier Luigi Penzo; Attendance: 8,537; Referee: Maria Sole Ferrieri Caputi

7 February 2026 23	Frosinone	1–2	Venezia	Frosinone
14:00 UTC+2	Raimondo 43'; Oyono (yellow card) 56'		Doumbia (yellow card) 24', (goal) 77'; Cittadini 63' (o.g.); Pérez (yellow card) 80'	Stadium: Stadio Benito Stirpe; Attendance: 13,395; Referee: Maurizio Mariani

10 February 2026 24	Venezia	0–2	Modena	Venice
19:00 UTC+2	Casas (red card) 45+2'; Pietrelli (yellow card) 85'; Svoboda (yellow card) 90+6'		Tonoli 27'; Beyuku 30', (yellow card) 30'; Imputato (yellow card) 72'; Cotali (yellow card) 90+2'	Stadium: Stadio Pier Luigi Penzo; Attendance: 8,109; Referee: Kevin Bonacina

14 February 2026 25	Cesena	0–4	Venezia	Cesena
18:30 UTC+2	Mangraviti (yellow card) 36'; Frobotta (yellow card) 70'; Zaro (yellow card) 86'		Busio 38'; Adorante 45+1'; Hainaut 62'; Doumbia (yellow card) 70'; Lauberbach 90+3' (pen.)	Stadium: Stadio Dino Manuzzi; Attendance: 9,859; Referee: Simone Galipò

21 February 2026 26	Venezia	3–2	Pescara	Venice
14:00 UTC+2	Adorante 41'; Yeboah 45+1'; Busio (yellow card) 63'; Hainaut 76'		Di Nardo 18', 58'; Gravillon (yellow card) 43'; Cagnano (yellow card) 68'; Brugman (yellow card) 70'; Olzer (yellow card) 89'	Stadium: Stadio Pier Luigi Penzo; Attendance: 11,664; Referee: Alberto Arena

28 February 2026 27	Südtirol	1–1	Venezia	Bolzano
14:00 UTC+2	Bordon (yellow card) 19'; Merkaj 47'		Hainaut 54'; Pérez (yellow card) 63'; Casas (yellow card) 90'	Stadium: Stadio Druso; Attendance: 4,328; Referee: Federico La Penna

3 March 2026 28	Venezia	4–0	Avellino	Venice
19:00 UTC+2	Franjić (yellow card) 25'; Dagasso 38', 90+1'; Reale 40' (o.g.); Busio 44'		Tutino (red card) 34'; Le Borgne (yellow card) 63' (red card) 85'	Stadium: Stadio Pier Luigi Penzo; Attendance: 7,874; Referee: Giuseppe Mucera

7 March 2026 29	Venezia	2–0	Reggiana	Venice
16:15 UTC+2	Haps 15', (yellow card) 39'; Doumbia 71'			Stadium: Stadio Pier Luigi Penzo; Attendance: 10,396; Referee: Daniele Chiffi

14 March 2026 30	Sampdoria	0–0	Venezia	Genoa
19:30 UTC+2	Begić (yellow card) 70'; Conti (yellow card) 80'			Stadium: Stadio Luigi Ferraris; Attendance: 22,441; Referee: Ermanno Feliciani

17 March 2026 31	Venezia	3–1	Padova	Venice
21:30 UTC+2	Svoboda 41'; Doumbia 46'; Pérez 74'; Compagnon (yellow card) 89'		Faedo (yellow card) 33'; Fusi (yellow card) 39'; Perrotta (yellow card) 63'; Capelli 82'	Stadium: Stadio Pier Luigi Penzo; Attendance: 11,081; Referee: Valerio Crezzini

21 March 2026 32	Monza	1–1	Venezia	Monza
18:15 UTC+2	Pessina 51' (pen.); Cuthrone (yellow card) 73'		Haps 26'	Stadium: Stadio Brianteo; Attendance: 8,819; Referee: Marco Guida

6 April 2026 33	Venezia	3–1	Juve Stabia	Venice
15:00 UTC+2	Giorgini 39' (o.g.); Adorante 45+3', 74'; Busio (yellow card) 70'; Svoboda (yellow card) 71'; Sagrado (yellow card) 79'		Giorgini (yellow card) 36'; Carissoni 45'; Bellich (yellow card) 45+3'	Stadium: Stadio Pier Luigi Penzo; Attendance: 10,956; Referee: Mario Perri

11 April 2026 34	Virtus Entella	1–1	Venezia	Chiavari
15:00 UTC+2	Guiu 61'; Squizzato (yellow card) 74'; Cuppone (yellow card) 89'; Marconi (yellow card) 90+3'		Haps 13', (yellow card) 60'; Hainaut (yellow card) 43'; Schingtienne (red card) 66'; Busio (yellow card) 87'; Šverko (yellow card) 90+2'	Stadium: Stadio Comunale; Attendance: 2,320; Referee: Simone Galipò

18 April 2026 35	Bari	0–3	Venezia	Bari
15:00 UTC+2	Rao (yellow card) 43'		Haps 19', 45+1'; Adorante 52'	Stadium: Stadio San Nicola; Attendance: 10,429; Referee: Federico Dionisi

25 April 2026 36	Venezia	2–0	Empoli	Venice
17:15 UTC+2	Adorante 50'; Doumbia 87'		Lovato (yellow card) 56'; Elia (yellow card) 90+4'	Stadium: Stadio Pier Luigi Penzo; Attendance: 12,038; Referee: Mario Perri

1 May 2026 37	Spezia	2–2	Venezia	La Spezia
15:00 UTC+2	Valoti (yellow card) 5', (goal) 73'; Vignali (yellow card) 43'; Bandinelli (red card) 45+2'; Artistico 90'; Nagy (yellow card) 90+2'		Yeboah 7'; Adorante (yellow card) 14'; Sagrado 70'; Busio (yellow card) 87'	Stadium: Stadio Alberto Picco; Attendance: 4,328; Referee: Andrea Colombo

8 May 2026 38	Venezia	2–0	Palermo	Venice
20:30 UTC+2	Doumbia 46', (yellow card) 74'; Compagnon 90+4', (yellow card) 90+5'		Bereszyński (yellow card) 7'; Peda (yellow card) 31'	Stadium: Stadio Pier Luigi Penzo; Attendance: 11,378; Referee: Andrea Zanotti

=== Coppa Italia ===
16 August 2025 First round	Venezia	4–0	Mantova	Venice
18:00	Doumbia 15', 45'; Yeboah 57', 89'			Stadium: Stadio Pier Luigi Penzo; Referee: Claudio Allegretta

24 September 2025 Second round	Hellas Verona	0–0 (4–5 p)	Venezia	Verona
18:30				Stadium: Stadio Marcantonio Bentegodi; Attendance: 7,021; Referee: Andrea Calzavara
	Penalties
	Kastanos (penalty scored); Ebosse (penalty missed); Al-Musrati (penalty scored); Giovane (penalty scored) \; Orban (penalty scored)		(penalty scored) Fila; (penalty scored) Yeboah; (penalty scored) Svoboda; (penalty scored) Bohinen; (penalty scored) Lella

3 December 2025 Round of 16	Internazionale	5–1	Venezia	Milan
21:00	Diouf 18'; Esposito 20'; Thuram 34', 51'; Bonny 75'		Sagrado 66'	Stadium: San Siro; Attendance: 44,910; Referee: Davide Di Marco
