= 2022–23 UEFA Nations League B =

Tournament details
- Dates: 2 June – 27 September 2022
- Teams: 16
- Promoted: Bosnia and Herzegovina; Israel; Scotland; Serbia
- Relegated: Armenia; Romania; Russia (expelled); Sweden

Tournament statistics
- Matches played: 42
- Goals scored: 112 (2.67 per match)
- Attendance: 758,681 (18,064 per match)
- Top scorer(s): (Norway) Erling Haaland (Serbia) Aleksandar Mitrović (6 goals each)

The 2022–23 UEFA Nations League B was the second division of the 2022–23 edition of the UEFA Nations League, the third season of the international football competition involving the men's national teams of the 55 member associations of UEFA.

== Format ==
League B consisted of 16 UEFA members ranked from 17 to 32 in the 2022–23 UEFA Nations League access list, split into four groups of four. Each team played six matches within their group, using the home-and-away round-robin format in June (quadruple matchdays) and September 2022 (double matchdays). The winners of each group were promoted to the 2024–25 UEFA Nations League A, and the fourth-placed team of each group were relegated to the 2024–25 UEFA Nations League C.

== Teams ==
=== Team changes ===
The following were the team changes in League B from the 2020–21 season:

Incoming
Relegated from Nations League A	Promoted from Nations League C
Bosnia and Herzegovina; Iceland; Sweden; Ukraine	Albania; Armenia; Montenegro; Slovenia

Outgoing
Promoted to Nations League A	Relegated to Nations League C
Austria; Czech Republic; Hungary; Wales	Bulgaria; Northern Ireland; Slovakia; Turkey

=== Seeding ===
In the 2022–23 access list, UEFA ranked teams based on the 2020–21 Nations League overall ranking. The seeding pots for the league phase were confirmed on 22 September 2021, and were based on the access list ranking.

Pot 1
Team	Rank
Ukraine	17
Sweden	18
Bosnia and Herzegovina	19
Iceland	20

Pot 2
Team	Rank
Finland	21
Norway	22
Scotland	23
Russia	24

Pot 3
Team	Rank
Israel	25
Romania	26
Serbia	27
Republic of Ireland	28

Pot 4
Team	Rank
Slovenia	29
Montenegro	30
Albania	31
Armenia	32

The draw for the league phase took place at the UEFA headquarters in Nyon, Switzerland on 16 December 2021, 18:00 CET. Each group contained one team from each pot. For political reasons, Russia and Ukraine (due to the Russian military intervention in Ukraine) could not be drawn in the same group. Due to restrictions of excessive travel, Armenia, Israel and Iceland could not all be in the same group.

== Groups ==
The fixture list was confirmed by UEFA on 17 December 2021, the day following the draw. The fixture list for Group 1 was amended due to the postponement of Path A of UEFA qualifying for the World Cup.

Times are CEST (UTC+2), as listed by UEFA (local times, if different, are in parentheses).

=== Group 1 ===
Pos	Team	Pld	W	D	L	GF	GA	GD	Pts	Promotion or relegation	(Scotland)	(Ukraine)	(Republic of Ireland)	(Armenia)
1	Scotland (P)	6	4	1	1	11	5	+6	13	Promotion to League A	—	3–0	2–1	2–0
2	Ukraine	6	3	2	1	10	4	+6	11		0–0	—	1–1	3–0
3	Republic of Ireland	6	2	1	3	8	7	+1	7		3–0	0–1	—	3–2
4	Armenia (R)	6	1	0	5	4	17	−13	3	Relegation to League C	1–4	0–5	1–0	—

Source: UEFA
Rules for classification: Tiebreakers
(P) Promoted; (R) Relegated
4 June 2022
15:00 (17:00 UTC+4)

Armenia	1–0	Republic of Ireland
Spertsyan 74'	Report

Vazgen Sargsyan Republican Stadium, Yerevan
Attendance: 10,600
Referee: Radu Petrescu (Romania)

8 June 2022
20:45 (19:45 UTC+1)

Scotland	2–0	Armenia
Ralston 28'; McKenna 40'	Report

Hampden Park, Glasgow
Attendance: 38,627
Referee: Sebastian Gishamer (Austria)
8 June 2022
20:45 (19:45 UTC+1)

Republic of Ireland	0–1	Ukraine
	Report	Tsyhankov 49'

Aviva Stadium, Dublin
Attendance: 40,111
Referee: Filip Glova (Slovakia)

11 June 2022
15:00

Ukraine	3–0	Armenia
Malinovskyi 61'; Karavayev 77'; Mykolenko 84'	Report

Stadion Miejski ŁKS, Łódź (Poland) (Note: Due to the Russian invasion of Ukraine, Ukraine were required to play their home matches at neutral venues until further notice.)
Attendance: 12,503
Referee: Daniel Stefański (Poland)
11 June 2022
18:00 (17:00 UTC+1)

Republic of Ireland	3–0	Scotland
Browne 20'; Parrott 28'; Obafemi 51'	Report

Aviva Stadium, Dublin
Attendance: 46,927
Referee: Marco Di Bello (Italy)

14 June 2022
18:00 (20:00 UTC+4)

Armenia	1–4	Scotland
Bichakhchyan 6'	Report	Armstrong 14', 45+1'; McGinn 50'; Adams 54'

Vazgen Sargsyan Republican Stadium, Yerevan
Attendance: 13,500
Referee: Nikola Dabanović (Montenegro)
14 June 2022
20:45

Ukraine	1–1	Republic of Ireland
Dovbyk 47'	Report	Collins 31'

Stadion Miejski ŁKS, Łódź (Poland)
Attendance: 10,641
Referee: Ali Palabıyık (Turkey)

21 September 2022
20:45 (19:45 UTC+1)

Scotland	3–0	Ukraine
McGinn 70'; Dykes 80', 87'	Report

Hampden Park, Glasgow
Attendance: 42,846
Referee: Maurizio Mariani (Italy)

24 September 2022
15:00 (17:00 UTC+4)

Armenia	0–5	Ukraine
	Report	Tymchyk 22'; Zubkov 57'; Dovbyk 69', 84'; Ihnatenko 81'

Vazgen Sargsyan Republican Stadium, Yerevan
Attendance: 7,200
Referee: João Pinheiro (Portugal)
24 September 2022
20:45 (19:45 UTC+1)

Scotland	2–1	Republic of Ireland
Hendry 50'; Christie 82' (pen.)	Report	Egan 18'

Hampden Park, Glasgow
Attendance: 48,853
Referee: Sandro Schärer (Switzerland)

27 September 2022
20:45 (19:45 UTC+1)

Republic of Ireland	3–2	Armenia
Egan 18'; Obafemi 52'; Brady 90+1' (pen.)	Report	Dashyan 71'; Spertsyan 73'

Aviva Stadium, Dublin
Attendance: 41,719
Referee: Rade Obrenovič (Slovenia)
27 September 2022
20:45

Ukraine	0–0	Scotland
	Report

Stadion Cracovii im. Józefa Piłsudskiego, Kraków (Poland)
Attendance: 13,534
Referee: Anastasios Sidiropoulos (Greece)

=== Group 2 ===
Pos	Team	Pld	W	D	L	GF	GA	GD	Pts	Promotion or relegation	(Israel)	(Iceland)	(Albania)	(Russia)
1	Israel (P)	4	2	2	0	8	6	+2	8	Promotion to League A	—	2–2	2–1	Canc.
2	Iceland	4	0	4	0	6	6	0	4		2–2	—	1–1	Canc.
3	Albania	4	0	2	2	4	6	−2	2		1–2	1–1	—	Canc.
4	Russia (Note: On 2 May 2022, UEFA announced that Russia were suspended and automatically relegated to League C due to their country's invasion of Ukraine.) (D)	0	0	0	0	0	0	0	0	Banned from tournament	Canc.	Canc.	Canc.	—

Source: UEFA
Rules for classification: Tiebreakers
(D) Disqualified; (P) Promoted
Notes:
2 June 2022
20:45

Albania	Cancelled	Russia
	Report

Arena Kombëtare, Tirana
2 June 2022
20:45 (21:45 UTC+3)

Israel	2–2	Iceland
Abada 25'; Weissman 84'	Report	Helgason 42'; Sigurðsson 53'

Sammy Ofer Stadium, Haifa
Attendance: 13,150
Referee: Andris Treimanis (Latvia)

6 June 2022
20:45 (18:45 UTC±0)

Iceland	1–1	Albania
Þorsteinsson 49'	Report	Seferi 30'

Laugardalsvöllur, Reykjavík
Attendance: 4,033
Referee: Craig Pawson (England)
6 June 2022
20:45 (21:45 UTC+3)

Israel	Cancelled	Russia
	Report

Sammy Ofer Stadium, Haifa

10 June 2022
20:45

Albania	1–2	Israel
Broja 45+2' (pen.)	Report	Solomon 57', 73'

Arena Kombëtare, Tirana
Attendance: 18,100
Referee: Tiago Martins (Portugal)
10 June 2022
20:45 (21:45 UTC+3)

Russia	Cancelled	Iceland
	Report

VTB Arena, Moscow

13 June 2022
20:45 (18:45 UTC±0)

Iceland	2–2	Israel
Þorsteinsson 9'; Helgason 60'	Report	Grétarsson 35' (o.g.); Peretz 65'

Laugardalsvöllur, Reykjavík
Attendance: 2,778
Referee: Duje Strukan (Croatia)
13 June 2022
20:45 (21:45 UTC+3)

Russia	Cancelled	Albania
	Report

VTB Arena, Moscow

24 September 2022
15:00 (13:00 UTC±0)

Iceland	Cancelled	Russia
	Report

24 September 2022
20:45 (21:45 UTC+3)

Israel	2–1	Albania
Weissman 46'; Baribo 90+2'	Report	Uzuni 88'

Bloomfield Stadium, Tel Aviv
Attendance: 29,200
Referee: Donatas Rumšas (Lithuania)

27 September 2022
20:45

Albania	1–1	Iceland
Lenjani 35'	Report	Anderson 90+7'

Arena Kombëtare, Tirana
Attendance: 8,800
Referee: Ricardo de Burgos Bengoetxea (Spain)
27 September 2022
20:45 (21:45 UTC+3)

Russia	Cancelled	Israel
	Report

=== Group 3 ===
Pos	Team	Pld	W	D	L	GF	GA	GD	Pts	Promotion or relegation	(Bosnia and Herzegovina)	(Finland)	(Montenegro)	(Romania)
1	Bosnia and Herzegovina (P)	6	3	2	1	8	8	0	11	Promotion to League A	—	3–2	1–0	1–0
2	Finland	6	2	2	2	8	6	+2	8		1–1	—	2–0	1–1
3	Montenegro	6	2	1	3	6	6	0	7 (Note: Head-to-head points: Montenegro 6, Romania 0.)		1–1	0–2	—	2–0
4	Romania (R)	6	2	1	3	6	8	−2	7	Relegation to League C	4–1	1–0	0–3	—

Source: UEFA
Rules for classification: Tiebreakers
(P) Promoted; (R) Relegated
Notes:
4 June 2022
18:00 (19:00 UTC+3)

Finland	1–1	Bosnia and Herzegovina
Pukki 45+1' (pen.)	Report	Prevljak 90+3'

Helsinki Olympic Stadium, Helsinki
Attendance: 20,181
Referee: Nicholas Walsh (Scotland)
4 June 2022
20:45

Montenegro	2–0	Romania
Mugoša 66'; Vukčević 87'	Report

City Stadium, Podgorica
Attendance: 3,998
Referee: Andreas Ekberg (Sweden)

7 June 2022
18:00 (19:00 UTC+3)

Finland	2–0	Montenegro
Pohjanpalo 31', 38'	Report

Helsinki Olympic Stadium, Helsinki
Attendance: 17,009
Referee: Allard Lindhout (Netherlands)
7 June 2022
21:05 (Note: The Bosnia and Herzegovina v Romania match, originally scheduled to kick-off at 20:45, was delayed to 21:05 due to adverse weather conditions.)

Bosnia and Herzegovina	1–0	Romania
Prevljak 68'	Report

Bilino Polje Stadium, Zenica
Attendance: 4,500
Referee: Sascha Stegemann (Germany)

11 June 2022
20:45

Montenegro	1–1	Bosnia and Herzegovina
Marušić 77'	Report	Menalo 62'

City Stadium, Podgorica
Attendance: 6,555
Referee: Daniele Orsato (Italy)
11 June 2022
20:45 (21:45 UTC+3)

Romania	1–0	Finland
Bancu 30'	Report

Stadionul Rapid-Giulești, Bucharest
Attendance: 11,503
Referee: Harald Lechner (Austria)

14 June 2022
20:45

Bosnia and Herzegovina	3–2	Finland
Pjanić 5' (pen.); Džeko 29', 58'	Report	Pukki 10'; Källman 18'

Bilino Polje Stadium, Zenica
Attendance: 8,150
Referee: Georgi Kabakov (Bulgaria)
14 June 2022
20:45 (21:45 UTC+3)

Romania	0–3	Montenegro
	Report	Mugoša 42', 56', 63'

Stadionul Rapid-Giulești, Bucharest
Attendance: 11,657
Referee: João Pinheiro (Portugal)

23 September 2022
20:45

Bosnia and Herzegovina	1–0	Montenegro
Demirović 45+1'	Report

Bilino Polje Stadium, Zenica
Attendance: 12,050
Referee: Szymon Marciniak (Poland)
23 September 2022
20:45 (21:45 UTC+3)

Finland	1–1	Romania
Pukki 12'	Report	Tănase 52'

Helsinki Olympic Stadium, Helsinki
Attendance: 20,130
Referee: Carlos del Cerro Grande (Spain)

26 September 2022
20:45

Montenegro	0–2	Finland
	Report	Antman 47'; Källman 53'

City Stadium, Podgorica
Attendance: 2,522
Referee: François Letexier (France)
26 September 2022
20:45 (21:45 UTC+3)

Romania	4–1	Bosnia and Herzegovina
Man 38'; Pușcaș 73', 86'; Rațiu 79'	Report	Džeko 77'

Stadionul Rapid-Giulești, Bucharest
Attendance: 12,693
Referee: Halil Umut Meler (Turkey)

=== Group 4 ===
Pos	Team	Pld	W	D	L	GF	GA	GD	Pts	Promotion or relegation	(Serbia)	(Norway)	(Slovenia)	(Sweden)
1	Serbia (P)	6	4	1	1	13	5	+8	13	Promotion to League A	—	0–1	4–1	4–1
2	Norway	6	3	1	2	7	7	0	10		0–2	—	0–0	3–2
3	Slovenia	6	1	3	2	6	10	−4	6		2–2	2–1	—	0–2
4	Sweden (R)	6	1	1	4	7	11	−4	4	Relegation to League C	0–1	1–2	1–1	—

Source: UEFA
Rules for classification: Tiebreakers
(P) Promoted; (R) Relegated
2 June 2022
20:45

Serbia	0–1	Norway
	Report	Haaland 26'

Rajko Mitić Stadium, Belgrade
Attendance: 9,726
Referee: Paweł Raczkowski (Poland)
2 June 2022
20:45

Slovenia	0–2	Sweden
	Report	Forsberg 39' (pen.); Kulusevski 88'

Stožice Stadium, Ljubljana
Attendance: 5,123
Referee: Ruddy Buquet (France)

5 June 2022
20:45

Serbia	4–1	Slovenia
A. Mitrović 24'; S. Milinković-Savić 56'; Jović 85'; Radonjić 90+2'	Report	Stojanović 30'

Rajko Mitić Stadium, Belgrade
Attendance: 10,925
Referee: Jesús Gil Manzano (Spain)
5 June 2022
20:45

Sweden	1–2	Norway
Elanga 90+2'	Report	Haaland 20' (pen.), 69'

Friends Arena, Solna
Attendance: 42,320
Referee: Anthony Taylor (England)

9 June 2022
20:45

Norway	0–0	Slovenia
	Report

Ullevaal Stadion, Oslo
Attendance: 18,134
Referee: Fábio Veríssimo (Portugal)
9 June 2022
20:45

Sweden	0–1	Serbia
	Report	Jović 45+3'

Friends Arena, Solna
Attendance: 24,123
Referee: Lawrence Visser (Belgium)

12 June 2022
18:00

Norway	3–2	Sweden
Haaland 10', 54' (pen.); Sørloth 77'	Report	Forsberg 62'; Gyökeres 90+5'

Ullevaal Stadion, Oslo
Attendance: 24,273
Referee: Harm Osmers (Germany)
12 June 2022
20:45

Slovenia	2–2	Serbia
Gnezda Čerin 48'; Šeško 53'	Report	Živković 8'; A. Mitrović 35'

Stožice Stadium, Ljubljana
Attendance: 13,782
Referee: Maurizio Mariani (Italy)

24 September 2022
18:00

Slovenia	2–1	Norway
Šporar 69'; Šeško 81'	Report	Haaland 47'

Stožice Stadium, Ljubljana
Attendance: 14,824
Referee: Lawrence Visser (Belgium)
24 September 2022
20:45

Serbia	4–1	Sweden
A. Mitrović 18', 45+1', 48'; Lukić 70'	Report	Claesson 15'

Rajko Mitić Stadium, Belgrade
Attendance: 14,122
Referee: Georgi Kabakov (Bulgaria)

27 September 2022
20:45

Norway	0–2	Serbia
	Report	Vlahović 42'; A. Mitrović 54'

Ullevaal Stadion, Oslo
Attendance: 24,364
Referee: Antonio Mateu Lahoz (Spain)
27 September 2022
20:45

Sweden	1–1	Slovenia
Forsberg 42'	Report	Šeško 28'

Friends Arena, Solna
Attendance: 22,895
Referee: Felix Zwayer (Germany)

== Goalscorers ==
There were 112 goals scored in 42 matches, for an average of 2.67 goals per match.

6 goals

- (Norway national football team) Erling Haaland
- (Serbia national football team) Aleksandar Mitrović

4 goals

- (Montenegro national football team) Stefan Mugoša

3 goals

- (Bosnia and Herzegovina national football team) Edin Džeko
- (Finland national football team) Teemu Pukki
- (Slovenia national football team) Benjamin Šeško
- (Sweden men's national football team) Emil Forsberg
- (Ukraine national football team) Artem Dovbyk

2 goals

- (Armenia national football team) Eduard Spertsyan
- (Bosnia and Herzegovina national football team) Smail Prevljak
- (Finland national football team) Benjamin Källman
- (Finland national football team) Joel Pohjanpalo
- (Iceland national football team) Jón Dagur Þorsteinsson
- (Iceland national football team) Þórir Jóhann Helgason
- (Israel national football team) Manor Solomon
- (Israel national football team) Shon Weissman
- (Republic of Ireland national football team) John Egan
- (Republic of Ireland national football team) Michael Obafemi
- (Romania national football team) George Pușcaș
- (Scotland national football team) Stuart Armstrong
- (Scotland national football team) Lyndon Dykes
- (Scotland national football team) John McGinn
- (Serbia national football team) Luka Jović

1 goal

- (Albania national football team) Armando Broja
- (Albania national football team) Ermir Lenjani
- (Albania national football team) Taulant Seferi
- (Albania national football team) Myrto Uzuni
- (Armenia national football team) Vahan Bichakhchyan
- (Armenia national football team) Artak Dashyan
- (Bosnia and Herzegovina national football team) Ermedin Demirović
- (Bosnia and Herzegovina national football team) Luka Menalo
- (Bosnia and Herzegovina national football team) Miralem Pjanić
- (Finland national football team) Oliver Antman
- (Iceland national football team) Mikael Anderson
- (Iceland national football team) Arnór Sigurðsson
- (Israel national football team) Liel Abada
- (Israel national football team) Tai Baribo
- (Israel national football team) Dor Peretz
- (Montenegro national football team) Adam Marušić
- (Montenegro national football team) Marko Vukčević
- (Norway national football team) Alexander Sørloth
- (Republic of Ireland national football team) Robbie Brady
- (Republic of Ireland national football team) Alan Browne
- (Republic of Ireland national football team) Nathan Collins
- (Republic of Ireland national football team) Troy Parrott
- (Romania national football team) Nicușor Bancu
- (Romania national football team) Dennis Man
- (Romania national football team) Andrei Rațiu
- (Romania national football team) Florin Tănase
- (Scotland national football team) Ché Adams
- (Scotland national football team) Ryan Christie
- (Scotland national football team) Jack Hendry
- (Scotland national football team) Scott McKenna
- (Scotland national football team) Anthony Ralston
- (Serbia national football team) Saša Lukić
- (Serbia national football team) Sergej Milinković-Savić
- (Serbia national football team) Nemanja Radonjić
- (Serbia national football team) Dušan Vlahović
- (Serbia national football team) Andrija Živković
- (Slovenia national football team) Adam Gnezda Čerin
- (Slovenia national football team) Andraž Šporar
- (Slovenia national football team) Petar Stojanović
- (Sweden men's national football team) Viktor Claesson
- (Sweden men's national football team) Anthony Elanga
- (Sweden men's national football team) Viktor Gyökeres
- (Sweden men's national football team) Dejan Kulusevski
- (Ukraine national football team) Danylo Ihnatenko
- (Ukraine national football team) Oleksandr Karavayev
- (Ukraine national football team) Ruslan Malinovskyi
- (Ukraine national football team) Vitaliy Mykolenko
- (Ukraine national football team) Viktor Tsyhankov
- (Ukraine national football team) Oleksandr Tymchyk
- (Ukraine national football team) Oleksandr Zubkov

1 own goal

- (Iceland national football team) Daníel Leó Grétarsson (against Israel)

== Overall ranking ==
The 16 League B teams were ranked 17th to 32nd overall in the 2022–23 UEFA Nations League according to the following rules:

- The teams finishing first in the groups were ranked 17th to 20th according to the results of the league phase.
- The teams finishing second in the groups were ranked 21st to 24th according to the results of the league phase
- The teams finishing third in the groups were ranked 25th to 28th according to the results of the league phase.
- The teams finishing fourth in Groups 1, 3, and 4 were ranked 29th to 31st according to the results of the league phase.
- Russia, disqualified from the competition and automatically ranked fourth in their group, was ranked 32nd. Because the members of group 2 played two fewer matches as a result, teams finishing first, second, and third in groups 1, 3, and 4 had their match results vs. the fourth place team in their groups discarded for the ranking.

Rnk	Grp	Team	Pld	W	D	L	GF	GA	GD	Pts
17	B2	Israel	4	2	2	0	8	6	+2	8
18	B3	Bosnia and Herzegovina	4	2	2	0	6	4	+2	8
19	B4	Serbia	4	2	1	1	8	4	+4	7
20	B1	Scotland	4	2	1	1	5	4	+1	7
21	B3	Finland	4	2	1	1	7	4	+3	7
22	B1	Ukraine	4	1	2	1	2	4	−2	5
23	B2	Iceland	4	0	4	0	6	6	0	4
24	B4	Norway	4	1	1	2	2	4	−2	4
25	B4	Slovenia	4	1	2	1	5	7	−2	5
26	B1	Republic of Ireland	4	1	1	2	5	4	+1	4
27	B2	Albania	4	0	2	2	4	6	−2	2
28	B3	Montenegro	4	0	1	3	1	6	−5	1
29	B3	Romania	6	2	1	3	6	8	−2	7
30	B4	Sweden	6	1	1	4	7	11	−4	4
31	B1	Armenia	6	1	0	5	4	17	−13	3
32	B2	Russia	0	0	0	0	0	0	0	0

Source: UEFA
Rules for classification: Ranking criteria

== Euro 2024 qualifying play-offs ==
The four best teams in League B according to the overall ranking that did not qualify for UEFA Euro 2024 through the qualifying group stage were set to compete in the play-offs, with the winners qualifying for the final tournament. As the Path A play-offs had a vacant spot, the next-best ranked unqualified team in League B, Iceland, qualified for the play-offs as well.

League B
Rank	Team
17 ^{GW}	Israel
18 ^{GW}	Bosnia and Herzegovina
19 ^{GW}	Serbia
20 ^{GW}	Scotland
21	Finland
22	Ukraine
23	Iceland
24	Norway
25	Slovenia
26	Republic of Ireland
27	Albania
28	Montenegro
29	Romania
30	Sweden
31	Armenia
32	Russia ^{‡}

Key

- ^{GW} Group winner from Nations League B
- Team qualified directly to final tournament
- Team in **bold** advanced to play-offs
- ‡ Banned from qualifying competition
