= 2013–14 Go Ahead Eagles season =

Go Ahead Eagles
2013–14 season
- Chairman: Edwin Lugt
- Head coach: Foeke Booy
- Stadium: De Adelaarshorst
- Eredivisie: 13th
- KNVB Cup: Third round
Home colours	Away colours

The 2013–14 season was the 111th season in the existence of Go Ahead Eagles and the club's first season back in the top flight of Dutch football. In addition to the domestic league, Go Ahead Eagles participated in this season's edition of the KNVB Cup.

== Players ==
=== First-team squad ===
Note: Flags indicate national team as defined under FIFA eligibility rules; some limited exceptions apply. Players may hold more than one non-FIFA nationality.

No.	Pos.	Nation	Player
1	GK	DEN	Stephan Andersen (on loan from Betis)
2	DF	NED	Mawouna Amevor
3	DF	NED	Bart Vriends
4	DF	NED	Jop van der Linden
5	DF	NED	Xandro Schenk
6	MF	NED	Sjoerd Overgoor
7	FW	NED	Jarchinio Antonia
8	MF	NED	Deniz Turuc
9	FW	NED	Marnix Kolder (captain)
10	MF	NED	Jeffrey Rijsdijk
11	FW	NED	Xander Houtkoop
12	DF	NED	Doke Schmidt (on loan from SC Heerenveen)
14	FW	BEL	Thomas Azevedo (on loan from OH Leuven)
15	DF	NED	Ridgeciano Haps (on loan from AZ)

No.	Pos.	Nation	Player
16	GK	NED	Erik Cummins
17	MF	NED	Erik Falkenburg (on loan from AZ)
18	MF	NED	Lars Lambooij
20	MF	NED	Joran Pot
21	FW	NED	Joey Godee (on loan from Cercle Brugge)
22	GK	NED	Patrick ter Mate
23	MF	NED	Tom Oostinjen
24	DF	NED	Joost Krijns
26	FW	NED	Teije ten Den
27	FW	NED	Omar Kavak
28	MF	NED	Kevin Spanjaard
29	DF	NED	Michel Gerritsen Mulkes
30	GK	NED	Ruben Lucas

=== Out on loan ===
Note: Flags indicate national team as defined under FIFA eligibility rules; some limited exceptions apply. Players may hold more than one non-FIFA nationality.

No.	Pos.	Nation	Player
—	DF	NED	Joeri Schroyen (at VVV-Venlo until 30 June 2014)
—	FW	NED	Guyon Philips (at FC Oss until 30 June 2014)

== Pre-season and friendlies ==
Win Draw Loss

9 July 2013 Friendly	Go Ahead Eagles (Netherlands)	3–0	(Netherlands) AZ	Terwolde, Netherlands
19:00 CEST (UTC+2)				Stadium: Sportpark De Woldermarck

13 July 2013 Friendly	Go Ahead Eagles (Netherlands)	4–1	(Netherlands) Excelsior	Terwolde, Netherlands
16:00 CEST (UTC+2)				Stadium: Sportpark De Woldermarck

16 July 2013 Friendly	Go Ahead Eagles (Netherlands)	2–1	(Germany) KFC Uerdingen 05	Oosterwolde, Netherlands
19:00 CEST (UTC+2)				Stadium: Sportpark Oostenburg

26 July 2013 Friendly	Go Ahead Eagles (Netherlands)	1–2	(Turkey) Sivasspor	Bathmen, Netherlands
19:00 CEST (UTC+2)				Stadium: Sportpark De Looënk

11 January 2014 Friendly	Almere City (Netherlands)	4–1	(Netherlands) Go Ahead Eagles	Netherlands
14:00 CET (UTC+1)

== Competitions ==
=== Overall record ===
Competition	First match	Last match	Starting round	Final position	Record							
Competition	First match	Last match	Starting round	Final position	Pld	W	D	L	GF	GA	GD	Win %
Eredivisie	4 August 2013	3 May 2014	Matchday 1	13th	34	10	8	16	45	69	−24	29.41
KNVB Cup	24 September 2013	31 October 2013	Second round	Third round	2	1	0	1	3	1	+2	50.00
Total					36	11	8	17	48	70	−22	30.56

Source: Soccerway

=== Eredivisie ===
==== League table ====
Pos	Team	Pld	W	D	L	GF	GA	GD	Pts	Qualification or relegation
11	PEC Zwolle	34	9	13	12	47	49	−2	40	Qualification for the Europa League play-off round (Note: PEC Zwolle qualified for the 2014–15 UEFA Europa League play-off round by winning the 2013–14 KNVB Cup.)
12	Cambuur	34	10	9	15	40	50	−10	39	
13	Go Ahead Eagles	34	10	8	16	45	69	−24	38	
14	Heracles	34	10	7	17	45	59	−14	37	
15	NAC Breda	34	8	11	15	43	54	−11	35	

Source: Eredivisie
Rules for classification: 1) points; 2) goal difference; 3) number of goals scored

==== Results summary ====
Overall								Home						Away					
Pld	W	D	L	GF	GA	GD	Pts	W	D	L	GF	GA	GD	W	D	L	GF	GA	GD
2	0	0	2	0	3	−3	0	0	0	1	0	1	−1	0	0	1	0	2	−2

Source: Eredivisie

==== Results by round ====
Round	1	2	3	4	5	6	7	8	9	10	11	12	13	14	15	16	17	18	19	20	21	22	23	24	25	26	27	28	29	30	31	32	33	34
Ground	A	H	A	H	A	A	H	A	H	H	A	H	A	H	A	H	A	H	A	H	A	H	H	A	A	H	H	A	H	A	A	H	A	H
Result	D	W	L	D	W	L	D	L	W	D	L	D	W	L	L	W	L	W	L	L	D	D	W	L	L	L	W	L	W	L	W	L	D	L
Position	7	7	12	11	7	10	11	15	11	11	13	14	12	13	13	11	12	10	10	12	13	13	12	12	14	14	12	15	15	14	11	13	13	13

Source: Eredivisie
A = Away; H = Home; W = Win; D = Draw; L = Loss

==== Matches ====
4 August 2013 1	Utrecht	1–1	Go Ahead Eagles	Utrecht
--:-- CET (UTC+1)

10 August 2013 2	Go Ahead Eagles	2–1	ADO Den Haag	Deventer
--:-- CET (UTC+1)

17 August 2013 3	PSV	3–0	Go Ahead Eagles	Eindhoven
--:-- CET (UTC+1)

25 August 2013 4	Go Ahead Eagles	3–3	Groningen	Deventer
--:-- CET (UTC+1)

31 August 2013 5	RKC Waalwijk	1–4	Go Ahead Eagles	Waalwijk
--:-- CET (UTC+1)

15 September 2013 6	AZ	3–0	Go Ahead Eagles	Alkmaar
--:-- CET (UTC+1)

20 September 2013 7	Go Ahead Eagles	0–0	Cambuur	Deventer
--:-- CET (UTC+1)

28 September 2013 8	Ajax	6–0	Go Ahead Eagles	Amsterdam
--:-- CET (UTC+1)

5 October 2013 9	Go Ahead Eagles	4–3	NEC	Deventer
--:-- CET (UTC+1)

19 October 2013 10	Go Ahead Eagles	2–2	Feyenoord	Deventer
--:-- CET (UTC+1)

26 October 2013 11	NAC Breda	5–0	Go Ahead Eagles	Breda
--:-- CET (UTC+1)

9 November 2013 13	Roda JC	1–4	Go Ahead Eagles	Kerkrade
--:-- CET (UTC+1)

24 November 2013 14	Go Ahead Eagles	0–3	Vitesse	Deventer
--:-- CET (UTC+1)

30 November 2013 15	Heerenveen	3–1	Go Ahead Eagles	Heerenveen
--:-- CET (UTC+1)

4 December 2013 12	Go Ahead Eagles	1–1	Heracles Almelo	Deventer
--:-- CET (UTC+1)

8 December 2013 16	Go Ahead Eagles	4–1	PEC Zwolle	Deventer
--:-- CET (UTC+1)

14 December 2013 17	Twente	3–1	Go Ahead Eagles	Enschede
--:-- CET (UTC+1)

21 December 2013 18	Go Ahead Eagles	2–1	Utrecht	Deventer
--:-- CET (UTC+1)

19 January 2014 19	Cambuur	2–0	Go Ahead Eagles	Leeuwarden
--:-- CET (UTC+1)

26 January 2014 20	Go Ahead Eagles	0–1	Ajax	Deventer
--:-- CET (UTC+1)

2 February 2014 21	NEC	1–1	Go Ahead Eagles	Nijmegen
--:-- CET (UTC+1)				Stadium: Goffertstadion

5 February 2014 22	Go Ahead Eagles	2–2	RKC Waalwijk	Deventer
--:-- CET (UTC+1)

8 February 2014 23	Go Ahead Eagles	2–1	AZ	Deventer
--:-- CET (UTC+1)

16 February 2014 24	Groningen	1–0	Go Ahead Eagles	Groningen
--:-- CET (UTC+1)

21 February 2014 25	ADO Den Haag	3–2	Go Ahead Eagles	The Hague
--:-- CET (UTC+1)

1 March 2014 26	Go Ahead Eagles	2–3	PSV	Deventer
--:-- CET (UTC+1)

9 March 2014 27	Go Ahead Eagles	1–0	Twente	Deventer
--:-- CET (UTC+1)

16 March 2014 28	PEC Zwolle	2–0	Go Ahead Eagles	Zwolle
--:-- CET (UTC+1)

30 March 2014 30	Feyenoord	5–0	Go Ahead Eagles	Rotterdam
--:-- CET (UTC+1)

2 April 2014 29	Go Ahead Eagles	2–1	NAC Breda	Deventer
--:-- CET (UTC+1)

5 April 2014 31	Heracles Almelo	1–2	Go Ahead Eagles	Almelo
--:-- CET (UTC+1)

12 April 2014 32	Go Ahead Eagles	0–2	Heerenveen	Deventer
--:-- CET (UTC+1)

27 April 2014 33	Vitesse	2–2	Go Ahead Eagles	Arnhem
--:-- CET (UTC+1)

4 May 2014 34	Go Ahead Eagles	0–1	Roda JC	Deventer
--:-- CET (UTC+1)

=== KNVB Cup ===
24 September 2013 Second round	DVS '33	0–3	Go Ahead Eagles
20:00 CET (UTC+1)		Report		Attendance: 1,500

31 October 2013 Third round	Excelsior	1–0	Go Ahead Eagles	Rotterdam
20:45 CET (UTC+1)				Stadium: Stadion Woudestein
