= John Yeboah =

Ecuadorian footballer (born 2000)

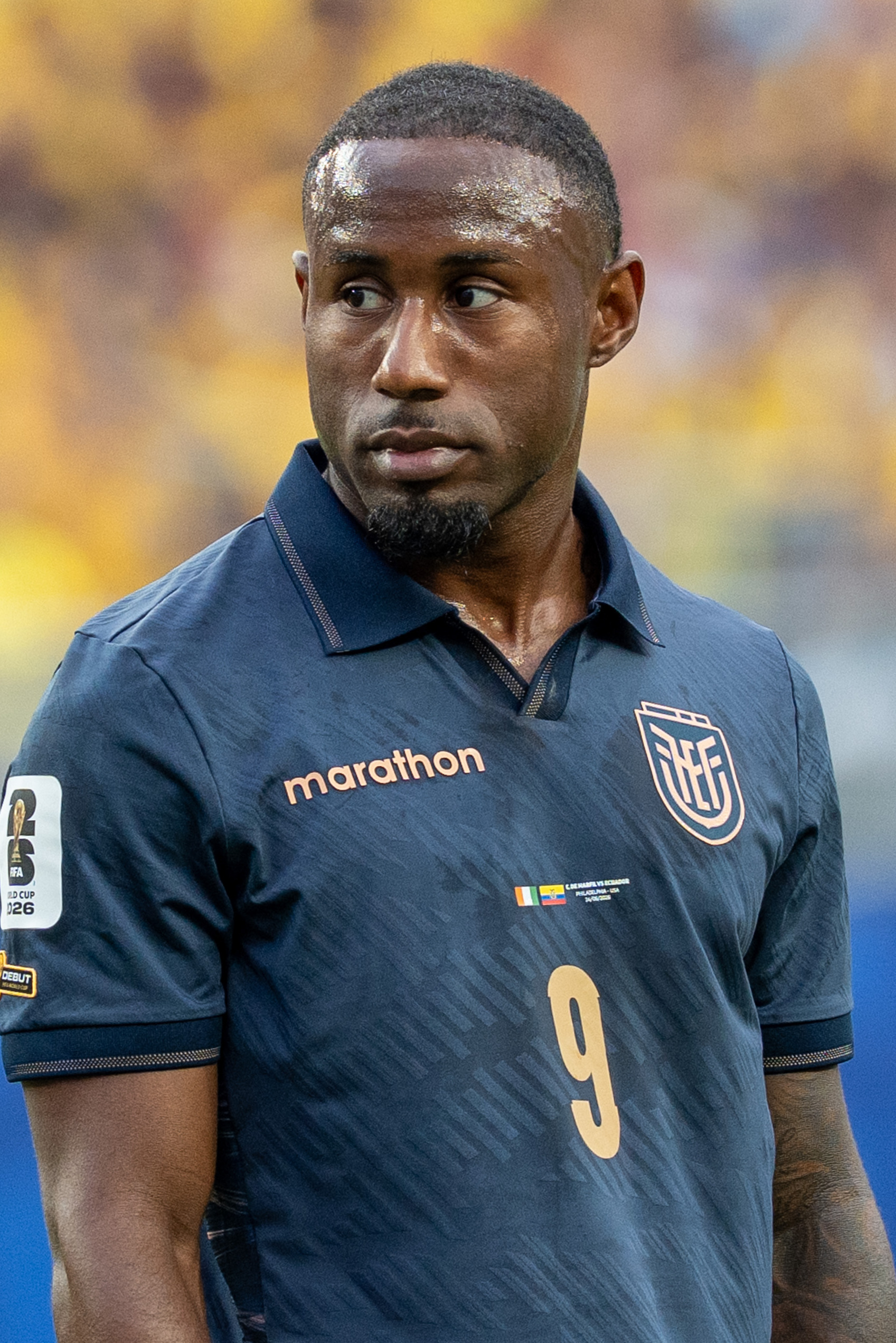
- Yeboah with Ecuador in 2026

Personal information
- Full name: John Yeboah Zamora
- Date of birth: 23 June 2000 (age 26)
- Place of birth: Hamburg, Germany
- Height: 1.70 m (5 ft 7 in)
- Position: Winger

Team information
- Current team: Venezia
- Number: 10

Youth career
- SV Rönneburg
- –2015: FC Türkiye Wilhelmsburg
- 2015–2019: VfL Wolfsburg

Senior career*
Years	Team	Apps	(Gls)
2018–2020	VfL Wolfsburg	2	(0)
2019–2020	VfL Wolfsburg II	5	(4)
2019–2020	→ VVV-Venlo (loan)	18	(1)
2020–2022	Willem II	17	(1)
2021	→ Almere City (loan)	17	(4)
2022	→ MSV Duisburg (loan)	17	(0)
2022–2023	Śląsk Wrocław	32	(10)
2023–2024	Raków Częstochowa	30	(3)
2024–	Venezia	72	(12)

International career^{‡}
2016	Germany U16	1	(0)
2016–2017	Germany U17	15	(3)
2018	Germany U18	3	(2)
2018–2019	Germany U19	7	(2)
2019	Germany U20	4	(2)
2024–	Ecuador	30	(3)
- * Club domestic league appearances and goals as of 19:39, 20 September 2026 (UTC) ‡ National team caps and goals as of 5 October 2026

John Yeboah Zamora (born 23 June 2000) is a professional footballer who plays as a winger for Serie A club Venezia. Born in Germany, he plays for the Ecuador national team.

== Club career ==
Yeboah began his youth career with Hamburg clubs SV Rönneburg and FC Türkiye Wilhelmsburg, before moving to the youth team of VfL Wolfsburg in 2015. In February 2018, Yeboah signed his first professional contract with Wolfsburg, lasting until 30 June 2021.

Yeboah made his professional debut for VfL Wolfsburg in the Bundesliga on 3 November 2018, coming on as a substitute in the 81st minute for Josip Brekalo in a 1–0 home loss against Borussia Dortmund.

In September 2019, Yeboah joined VVV-Venlo on a season-long loan deal.

He was loaned to MSV Duisburg in January 2022 from his parent club, Willem II.

On 25 June 2022, he joined Polish club Śląsk Wrocław on a three-year deal. On 15 July 2022, he made his Ekstraklasa debut, coming on as a substitute in a 0–0 Lower Silesia derby draw with Zagłębie Lubin.

On 6 July 2023, Yeboah moved to defending Polish champions Raków Częstochowa on a three-year contract, for a fee reported to be €1.5 million. After the 2024 Copa América concluded, Yeboah refused to resume training in Poland and was subsequently fined and moved to the reserve team.

On 30 August 2024, Italian club Venezia announced the signing of Yeboah on a four-year deal, for a transfer fee of over €2.5 million.

== International career ==
Born in Germany, Yeboah is eligible to play for his country of birth, as well as for Ghana and Ecuador through his parents.

Yeboah began his youth international career with the Germany under-16 team, making his debut on 16 May 2016 in a friendly against France, which finished as a 1–1 away draw. In 2017, he was included in Germany's squad for the 2017 UEFA European Under-17 Championship in Croatia. He scored against Serbia in the group stage, with Germany managing to reach the semi-finals before losing on penalties to Spain. Later that year, Yeboah was included in Germany's squad for the 2017 FIFA U-17 World Cup in India. He scored against Colombia in the round of 16, with Germany later being eliminated in the quarter-finals.

On 7 October 2023, he received his first call-up to the Ecuador national team for the 2026 FIFA World Cup qualifying matches against Bolivia and Colombia, scheduled for 12 and 16 October.

He featured for Ecuador during the 2024 Copa América tournament played in the United States. On 4 July 2024, in a quarter-final against Argentina, he provided an assist to Kevin Rodríguez in stoppage time to tie the game at 1–1. Yeboah was one of the two Ecuadorian players to convert a penalty during an eventual shoot-out, lost by Ecuador 2–4.

On 31 May 2026, Yeboah was selected in the 26-man squad for the 2026 FIFA World Cup.

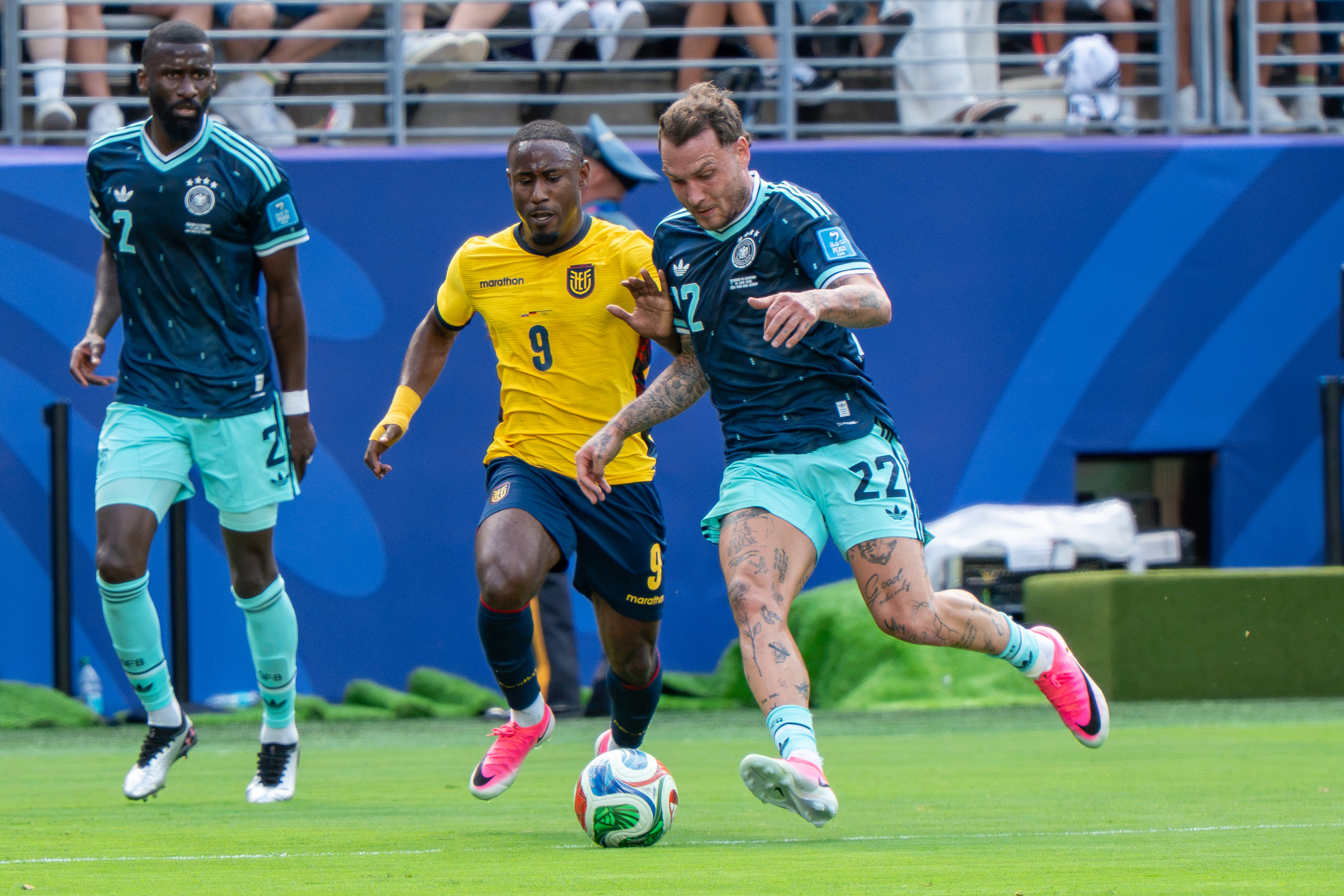
Yeboah during Ecuador v Germany at the 2026 FIFA World Cup

== Personal life ==
Yeboah was born in Hamburg, Germany, to a Ghanaian father and an Ecuadorian mother.

== Career statistics ==
=== Club ===
As of match played 20 September 2026

Appearances and goals by club, season and competition
Club	Season	League			National cup		Europe		Other		Total	
Club	Season	Division	Apps	Goals	Apps	Goals	Apps	Goals	Apps	Goals	Apps	Goals
VfL Wolfsburg	2018–19	Bundesliga	2	0	1	0	—		—		3	0
VfL Wolfsburg II	2018–19	Regionalliga Nord	5	4	—		—		—		5	4
VVV-Venlo (loan)	2019–20	Eredivisie	18	1	—		—		—		18	1
Willem II	2020–21	Eredivisie	9	1	1	0	—		1 (Note: Appearance in Eredivisie European play-offs)	0	11	1
Willem II	2021–22	Eredivisie	8	0	1	0	—		—		9	0
Willem II	Total		17	1	2	0	—		1	0	20	1
Almere City (loan)	2020–21	Eerste Divisie	17	4	—		—		1 (Note: Appearance in Eerste Divisie relegation play-offs)	0	18	4
MSV Duisburg (loan)	2021–22	3. Liga	17	0	—		—		—		17	0
Śląsk Wrocław	2022–23	Ekstraklasa	32	10	4	3	—		—		36	13
Raków Częstochowa	2023–24	Ekstraklasa	30	3	2	0	11 (Note: Six appearances and one goal in UEFA Champions League, five appearances in UEFA Europa League)	1	1 (Note: Appearance in Polish Super Cup)	0	44	4
Venezia	2024–25	Serie A	33	1	0	0	—		—		33	1
Venezia	2025–26	Serie B	34	10	2	2	—		—		36	12
Venezia	2026–27	Serie A	5	1	1	1	—		—		6	2
Venezia	Total		72	12	3	3	—		—		75	15
Career total			210	35	12	6	11	1	3	0	234	42

=== International ===
As of match played 5 October 2026

Appearances and goals by national team and year
National team	Year	Apps	Goals
Ecuador	2024	11	2
Ecuador	2025	8	0
Ecuador	2026	10	1
Total		30	3

Ecuador score listed first, score column indicates score after each Yeboah goal.

List of international goals scored by John Yeboah
No.	Date	Venue	Opponent	Score	Result	Competition
1	21 March 2024	Red Bull Arena, Harrison, United States	Guatemala	1–0	2–0	Friendly
2	12 June 2024	Subaru Park, Chester, United States	Bolivia	2–0	3–1	Friendly
3	27 March 2026	Metropolitano Stadium, Madrid, Spain	Morocco	1–0	1–1	Friendly

== Honours ==
Venezia

- Serie B: 2025–26

Individual

- Ekstraklasa Player of the Month: February 2023
