= 2023–24 US Triestina Calcio 1918 season =

US Triestina Calcio 1918
2023–24 season
- Manager: Attilio Tesser
- Stadium: Stadio Nereo Rocco
- Serie C Group A: 4th
- Promotion play-offs: National phase first round
- Coppa Italia Serie C: Round of 16
- Top goalscorer: League: Facundo Lescano (16); All: Facundo Lescano (16)

The 2023–24 season is US Triestina Calcio 1918's 106th season in existence and third consecutive season in the Serie C. They also competed in the Coppa Italia Serie C.

== Players ==
=== First-team squad ===
As of 20 March 2024

Note: Flags indicate national team as defined under FIFA eligibility rules; some limited exceptions apply. Players may hold more than one non-FIFA nationality.

No.	Pos.	Nation	Player
1	GK	SLO	Kristjan Matošević
3	MF	ITA	Alessandro Malomo
4	MF	ITA	Andrea Vallocchia
5	MF	TUR	Teoman Gündüz
6	DF	ITA	Matteo Anzolin
7	DF	SLO	Aljaž Struna
8	MF	NED	Rayan El Azrak
9	FW	NED	Daishawn Redan (on loan from Venezia)
10	FW	ARG	Facundo Lescano (on loan from Pescara)
13	DF	ITA	Matteo Ciofani
14	MF	ITA	Umberto Germano
15	MF	FRA	Omar Correia
16	GK	MLI	Madou Diakité

No.	Pos.	Nation	Player
17	MF	ISL	Kristófer Jónsson
18	FW	ITA	Mattia Minesso
21	MF	CIV	Lamine Fofana
22	GK	ITA	Giuseppe Agostino
28	MF	ITA	Enrico Celeghin
30	MF	ITA	Christian D'Urso (on loan from Cosenza)
31	DF	ITA	Nicholas Rizzo
33	MF	ITA	Marco Ballarini (on loan from Udinese)
38	DF	CAN	Luca Petrasso (on loan from Orlando City)
42	DF	ITA	Lorenzo Moretti
72	DF	SLO	Daniel Pavlev
99	FW	FIN	Eetu Vertainen

=== Out on loan ===
Note: Flags indicate national team as defined under FIFA eligibility rules; some limited exceptions apply. Players may hold more than one non-FIFA nationality.

No.	Pos.	Nation	Player
—	MF	ITA	Alessandro Coppola (at Birkirkara until 30 June 2024)
—	MF	POL	Olaf Kozłowski (at Pro Vercelli until 30 June 2024)
—	MF	ITA	Gabriele Parlanti (at Sestri Levante until 30 June 2024)

No.	Pos.	Nation	Player
—	MF	SLO	Aaron Kacinari (at Tulsa until 31 December 2024)
—	FW	ITA	Andrea Adorante (at Juve Stabia until 30 June 2024)
—	FW	ITA	Mattia Felici (at Feralpisalò until 30 June 2024)

== Pre-season and friendlies ==
Win Draw Loss Fixtures

18 November 2023 Friendly	Rijeka (Croatia)	1–1	(Italy) Triestina
14:30 CET (UTC+1)

== Competitions ==
=== Overall record ===
Competition	First match	Last match	Starting round	Final position	Record							
Competition	First match	Last match	Starting round	Final position	Pld	W	D	L	GF	GA	GD	Win %
Serie C	4 September 2023	28 April 2024	Matchday 1		38	19	7	12	61	44	+17	50.00
Promotion play-offs	11 May 2024		Second round		2	0	2	0	2	2	+0	0.00
Coppa Italia Serie C	3 October 2023	28 November 2023	First round	Round of 16	3	2	0	1	4	2	+2	66.67
Total					43	21	9	13	67	48	+19	48.84

Last updated: 14 May 2024
Source: Soccerway

=== Serie C ===
==== League table ====
Pos	Team	Pld	W	D	L	GF	GA	GD	Pts	Qualification
2	Padova	38	21	14	3	55	28	+27	77	National play-offs 2nd round
3	Vicenza	38	20	11	7	52	30	+22	71	National play-offs 1st round
4	Triestina	38	19	7	12	61	44	+17	64	Group play-offs 2nd round
5	Atalanta U23	38	16	11	11	43	36	+7	59	Group play-offs 1st round
6	Legnago	38	13	17	8	46	39	+7	56	Group play-offs 1st round

Updated to match(es) played on 28 April 2024. Source: Lega Pro, Soccerway (in English)
Rules for classification: 1) Points; 2) Head-to-head points; 3) Head-to-head goal difference; 4) Goal difference; 5) Goals scored; 6) Lower goals against; 7) Wins; 8) Lower losses; 9) Away wins; 10) Lower home losses.
(Note: Head-to-head record is used only after all the matches between the teams in question have been played)

==== Results summary ====
Overall								Home						Away					
Pld	W	D	L	GF	GA	GD	Pts	W	D	L	GF	GA	GD	W	D	L	GF	GA	GD
38	19	7	12	64	44	+20	64	7	6	6	29	23	+6	12	1	6	35	21	+14

Source: Worldfootball

==== Results by round ====
Round	1	2	3	4	5	6	7	8	9	10	11	12	13	14	15	16	17	18
Ground	H	A	H	A	A	H	A	H	H	A	H	A	H	A	H	A	H	A
Result	L	W	W	L	W	W	D	W	D	W	W	W	D	L	W	W	W	W
Position	16	11	6	8	5	4	5											

Updated to match(es) played on 17 December 2023. Source: Worldfootball
A = Away; H = Home; W = Win; D = Draw; L = Loss

==== Matches ====
The league fixtures were unveiled on 7 August 2023.

4 September 2023 1	Triestina	0–1	Trento	Trieste
20:45 CEST (UTC+2)				Stadium: Stadio Nereo Rocco

10 September 2023 2	AlbinoLeffe	1–2	Triestina	Zanica
18:30 CEST (UTC+2)	Gușu 63'		Lescano 65', 75'	Stadium: AlbinoLeffe Stadium; Referee: Edoardo Gianquinto

16 September 2023 3	Triestina	2–0	Pro Vercelli	Trieste
20:45 CEST (UTC+2)				Stadium: Stadio Nereo Rocco

19 September 2023 4	Pergolettese	2–1	Triestina	Crema
18:30 CEST (UTC+2)				Stadium: Stadio Giuseppe Voltini

24 September 2023 5	Pro Patria	0–3	Triestina	Busto Arsizio
14:00 CEST (UTC+2)				Stadium: Stadio Carlo Speroni

29 September 2023 6	Triestina	4–1	Mantova	Trieste
20:45 CEST (UTC+2)	Lescano 19' (pen.), 20', 46'; Finotto 50'		Burrai 53'	Stadium: Stadio Nereo Rocco

7 October 2023 7	Renate	1–1	Triestina	Legnago
16:15 CEST (UTC+2)				Stadium: Stadio Mario Sandrini

14 October 2023 8	Triestina	2–1	Lumezzane	Trieste
14:00 CEST (UTC+2)				Stadium: Stadio Nereo Rocco

20 October 2023 9	Triestina	0–0	Vicenza	Trieste
20:45 CEST (UTC+2)				Stadium: Stadio Nereo Rocco

24 October 2023 10	Legnago Salus	1–3	Triestina	Legnago
18:30 CEST (UTC+2)				Stadium: Stadio Mario Sandrini

28 October 2023 11	Triestina	2–1	Fiorenzuola	Trieste
18:30 CEST (UTC+2)				Stadium: Stadio Nereo Rocco

4 November 2023 12	Alessandria	0–3	Triestina	Alessandria
16:15 CET (UTC+1)			Redan 9', 44', 88'	Stadium: Stadio Giuseppe Moccagatta; Referee: Giuseppe Mucera

11 November 2023 13	Triestina	0–0	Pro Sesto	Trieste
16:15 CET (UTC+1)				Stadium: Stadio Nereo Rocco

25 November 2023 15	Triestina	4–1	Arzignano Valchiampo	Trieste
18:30 CET (UTC+1)				Stadium: Stadio Nereo Rocco

2 December 2023 16	Virtus Verona	0–2	Triestina	Verona
18:30 CET (UTC+1)				Stadium: Stadio Gavagnin-Nocini

5 December 2023 14	Atalanta U23	2–1	Triestina	Bergamo
16:15 CET (UTC+1)				Stadium: Gewiss Stadium

9 December 2023 17	Triestina	2–1	Giana Erminio	Trieste
18:30 CET (UTC+1)				Stadium: Stadio Nereo Rocco

17 December 2023 18	Novara	2–3	Triestina	Novara
14:00 CET (UTC+1)	Corti 24'; Scappini 77' (pen.)		Celeghin 15'; Finotto 90+3'; Malomo 90+5'	Stadium: Stadio Silvio Piola; Referee: Samuele Andreano

==== Promotion play-offs ====
11 May 2024 Second round	Triestina	1–1	Giana Erminio	Trieste
20:30 CEST (UTC+2)				Stadium: Stadio Nereo Rocco

=== Coppa Italia Serie C ===
3 October 2023 First round	Virtus Verona	0–1	Triestina	Verona
20:45 CEST (UTC+2)				Stadium: Stadio Gavagnin-Nocini

7 November 2023 Second round	Triestina	4–0	Renate	Trieste
16:15 CET (UTC+1)				Stadium: Stadio Nereo Rocco

28 November 2023 Round of 16	Vicenza	2–0	Triestina	Vicenza
21:00 CET (UTC+1)				Stadium: Stadio Romeo Menti
