= Issa Doumbia (footballer) =

Italian footballer (born 2003)

Personal information
- Date of birth: 16 October 2003 (age 23)
- Place of birth: Treviglio, Italy
- Height: 1.87 m (6 ft 2 in)
- Position: Midfielder

Team information
- Current team: Sporting CP
- Number: 77

Youth career
- FCSB: Ciserano
- AlbinoLeffe

Senior career*
Years	Team	Apps	(Gls)
2021–2024	AlbinoLeffe	76	(3)
2024–2026	Venezia	61	(8)
2026–	Sporting CP	10	(0)

International career^{‡}
2025	Italy U21	3	(0)
2026–	Italy	6	(0)
- * Club domestic league appearances and goals as of 09:25, 4 November 2026 (UTC) ‡ National team caps and goals as of 15 November 2026

Issa Doumbia (born 16 October 2003) is an Italian professional footballer who plays as a midfielder for Primeira Liga club Sporting CP and the Italy national team.

== Early life ==
Doumbia was born on 16 October 2003 in Italy. As a youth player, he joined the academy of Italian side AlbinoLeffe. He is the son of a truck driver father and a housewife mother. He has five brothers, and is of Ivorian descent.

== Club career ==
Doumbia started his career with Italian side AlbinoLeffe. In 2024, he signed for Serie A side Venezia. On 11 August 2024, he debuted for the club during a 3–1 Coppa Italia loss to Brescia.

On 1 June 2026, Primeira Liga club Sporting CP announced they had signed Doumbia ahead of the 2026–27 season.

== International career ==
He is an Italy youth international, having represented the U21 team.

Doumbia was one of the players who were called up with the Italy national team by head coach Roberto Mancini for the 2026–27 UEFA Nations League matches against Belgium, Turkey and France between 25 September and 5 October 2026.

== Style of play ==
Doumbia mainly operates as a midfielder. He specifically operates as a central midfielder. He is right-footed. He has been described as a "very physically strong midfielder, with excellent timing of insertion but who could certainly grow in terms of scoring... who guarantees, in all respects, reliability and security in midfield".

== Career statistics ==
=== Club ===
As of match played 3 November 2026

Appearances and goals by club, season and competition
Club	Season	League			National cup (Note: Includes Coppa Italia Serie C, Coppa Italia)		League cup		Europe		Other		Total	
Club	Season	Division	Apps	Goals	Apps	Goals	Apps	Goals	Apps	Goals	Apps	Goals	Apps	Goals
AlbinoLeffe	2021–22	Serie C	9	1	3	0	—		—		—		12	1
AlbinoLeffe	2022–23	Serie C	34	0	1	0	—		—		2 (Note: Appearances in Serie C promotion play-offs)	1	37	1
AlbinoLeffe	2023–24	Serie C	33	2	0	0	—		—		—		33	2
AlbinoLeffe	Total		76	3	4	0	—		—		2	1	82	4
Venezia	2024–25	Serie A	24	0	1	0	—		—		—		25	0
Venezia	2025–26	Serie B	37	8	1	2	—		—		—		38	10
Venezia	Total		61	8	2	2	—		—		—		63	10
Sporting CP	2026–27	Primeira Liga	10	0	0	0	0	0	4 (Note: Appearances in UEFA Champions League)	2	—		14	2
Career total			147	11	6	2	0	0	4	2	2	1	159	16

=== International ===
As of match played 15 November 2026

Appearances and goals by national team and year
National team	Year	Apps	Goals
Italy	2026	6	0
Total		6	0
