= Omar Kavak =

Dutch-Turkish footballer

Personal information
- Full name: Omar Kavak
- Date of birth: 24 October 1988 (age 38)
- Place of birth: Enschede, Netherlands
- Height: 1.78 m (5 ft 10 in)
- Position: Left winger

Team information
- Current team: Genemuiden

Youth career
- –2008: Heracles Almelo

Senior career*
Years	Team	Apps	(Gls)
2008–2009	PKC '83		
2009–2011	SVZW		
2011–2014	Go Ahead Eagles	6	(0)
2014–2015	FC Emmen	0	(0)
2015–2016	WKE	14	(0)
2016–2017	SVZW		
2017–	Genemuiden		
- * Club domestic league appearances and goals as of 19 July 2014 (UTC)

Omar Kavak is a Dutch / Turkish footballer who plays as a left winger. He is currently without a club after he was released by FC Emmen.
