= Þórir Jóhann Helgason =

Icelandic footballer (born 2000)

Personal information
- Date of birth: 28 September 2000 (age 26)
- Place of birth: Hafnarfjörður, Iceland
- Height: 1.87 m (6 ft 2 in)
- Position: Attacking midfielder

Team information
- Current team: Venezia
- Number: 21

Youth career
- –2016: Haukar

Senior career*
Years	Team	Apps	(Gls)
2017–2018	Haukar	9	(0)
2018–2021	FH	46	(3)
2021–2026	Lecce	66	(1)
2023–2024	→ Eintracht Braunschweig (loan)	27	(3)
2026–	Venezia	0	(0)

International career^{‡}
2017	Iceland U18	4	(0)
2018	Iceland U19	5	(0)
2019–2021	Iceland U21	7	(0)
2021–	Iceland	20	(2)
- * Club domestic league appearances and goals as of 23 August 2026 ‡ National team caps and goals as of 16:56, 9 September 2025 (UTC)

Þórir Jóhann Helgason (born 28 September 2000) is an Icelandic professional footballer who plays as an attacking midfielder for Serie A club Venezia and the Iceland national team.

== Club career ==
On 15 July 2021, Þórir signed a four-year contract with an option for fifth year with Serie B club Lecce.

On 31 August 2023, he moved on loan to Eintracht Braunschweig in the 2. Bundesliga, with an option to buy.

On 1 July 2026, Þórir moved to Venezia on a three-year deal.

== International career ==
Þórir made his international debut for Iceland on 29 May 2021 in a friendly match against Mexico in Arlington, Texas.

== Career statistics ==
=== Club ===
As of match played 25 May 2025

Appearances and goals by club, season and competition
Club	Season	League			Cup		Continental		Total	
Club	Season	Division	Apps	Goals	Apps	Goals	Apps	Goals	Apps	Goals
Haukar	2017	1. deild karla	9	0	0	0	—		9	0
FH	2018	Úrvalsdeild	1	1	2	0	—		3	1
FH	2019	Úrvalsdeild	16	0	3	0	—		19	0
FH	2020	Úrvalsdeild	18	2	3	2	1 (Note: Appearance(s) in UEFA Europa League)	0	22	4
FH	2021	Úrvalsdeild	11	0	1	0	1 (Note: Appearance(s) in UEFA Europa Conference League)	0	13	0
FH	Total		46	3	9	2	2	0	57	5
Lecce	2021-22	Serie B	25	1	3	0	—		28	1
Lecce	2022-23	Serie A	12	0	1	0	—		13	0
Lecce	2024-25	Serie A	21	0	0	0	—		21	0
Lecce	Total		58	1	4	0	—		62	1
Eintracht Braunschweig (loan)	2023-24	2. Bundesliga	27	3	—		—		27	3
Career total			140	7	13	2	2	0	155	9

=== International ===
As of match played 9 September 2025

Appearances and goals by national team and year
National team	Year	Apps	Goals
Iceland	2021	7	0
Iceland	2022	9	2
Iceland	2023	0	0
Iceland	2024	0	0
Iceland	2025	4	0
Total		20	2

As of match played 13 June 2022
Scores and results list Iceland's goal tally first, score column indicates score after each Þórir goal.

List of international goals scored by Þórir Jóhann Helgason
No.	Date	Venue	Opponent	Score	Result	Competition
1	2 June 2022	Sammy Ofer Stadium, Haifa, Israel	Israel	1–1	2–2	2022–23 UEFA Nations League B
2	13 June 2022	Laugardalsvöllur, Reykjavík, Iceland	Israel	2–1	2–2	2022–23 UEFA Nations League B

== Honours ==
International

- Baltic Cup: 2022
