= Sebastian Gishamer =

Austrian football referee (born 1988)

- Gishamer in 2016
- Born: 13 October 1988 (age 38); Salzburg, Austria

Sebastian Gishamer (Salzburg, 13 October 1988) is an Austrian football referee, who is affiliated with the Salzburg Football Association. He has been included on the FIFA International Referees List since 2019, and currently is a UEFA first category referee.

== Refereeing career ==
=== Refereeing in Austria ===
Gishamer has been a referee since 2004. Since then he is a member of the Salzburg football association. At the age of 20, he reached the Regionalliga West, then the third tier of Austrian football.

Alongside his early career as a referee, Gishamer worked as an assistant referee. On 1 August 2008, he made his debut as an assistant in the Austrian First League, working alongside Bernhard Brugger in a match between DSV Leoben and SKN St. Pölten, which Leoben won 2–1.

On 18 July 2009, he made his first appearance as an assistant referee in the Austrian Bundesliga, again alongside Brugger, in a match between LASK Linz and SV Mattersburg, which LASK won 4–0.

On 24 October 2010, Gishamer made his first appearance in Switzerland's Swiss Super League, assisting Brugger in a match between FC St. Gallen and FC Basel, which Basel won 3–1.

On 8 April 2013, Gishamer made his debut as a referee in the Austrian First League, then the country's second-highest division. He officiated the match between Kapfenberger SV and SCR Altach, which ended in a 2–2 draw, issuing seven yellow cards, all in the second half.

He was promoted to the Austrian Bundesliga for the 2016–17 season. Among the notable assignments in his domestic career were matches in the 2020–21 relegation play-offs and the European competition play-offs in the 2021–22 and 2023–24 seasons.

In May 2024, Gishamer was appointed referee for the Austrian Cup final between SK Sturm Graz and SK Rapid Wien. Sturm Graz won the match 2–1.

=== International refereeing ===
His first international assignment as an assistant referee in the UEFA Europa League came on 9 August 2012, when he assisted Oliver Drachta in the third qualifying round match between ND Mura 05 and Arsenal Kyiv. Arsenal Kyiv won the match 2–0.

The Austrian Football Association nominated Gishamer for the FIFA international referees list at the beginning of 2019, making him eligible to officiate international matches. His first international assignment was in March 2019, during qualification for the UEFA European Under-17 Championship, in a match between Spain and Kosovo. His first senior international match followed in July 2020, when he officiated a friendly between Slovenia and San Marino.

From the 2023–24 season, Gishamer was part of UEFA's First Category of referees and officiated matches in European club competitions, including the UEFA Europa League and the UEFA Europa Conference League.

In March 2024, he refereed the international friendly between England and Belgium at Wembley Stadium in London. The match ended in a 2–2 draw.

On 21 October 2026, he officiated the UEFA Champions League game between Aston Villa and Viking.

== Awards ==
In May 2026, Sebastian Gishamer was named as the "Austrian Referee of the Season for 2025/26 season", following a successful campaign that featured debuts in the UEFA Champions League and UEFA Conference League.

== Personal life ==
Gishamer is a civil engineer by profession and operates a planning and architecture office based in Berchtesgaden, Germany. He is also involved in several property companies.

He lives in Seekirchen am Wallersee in Austria, with his wife Linda, and their two children.
