= Andrea Adorante =

Italian footballer (born 2000)

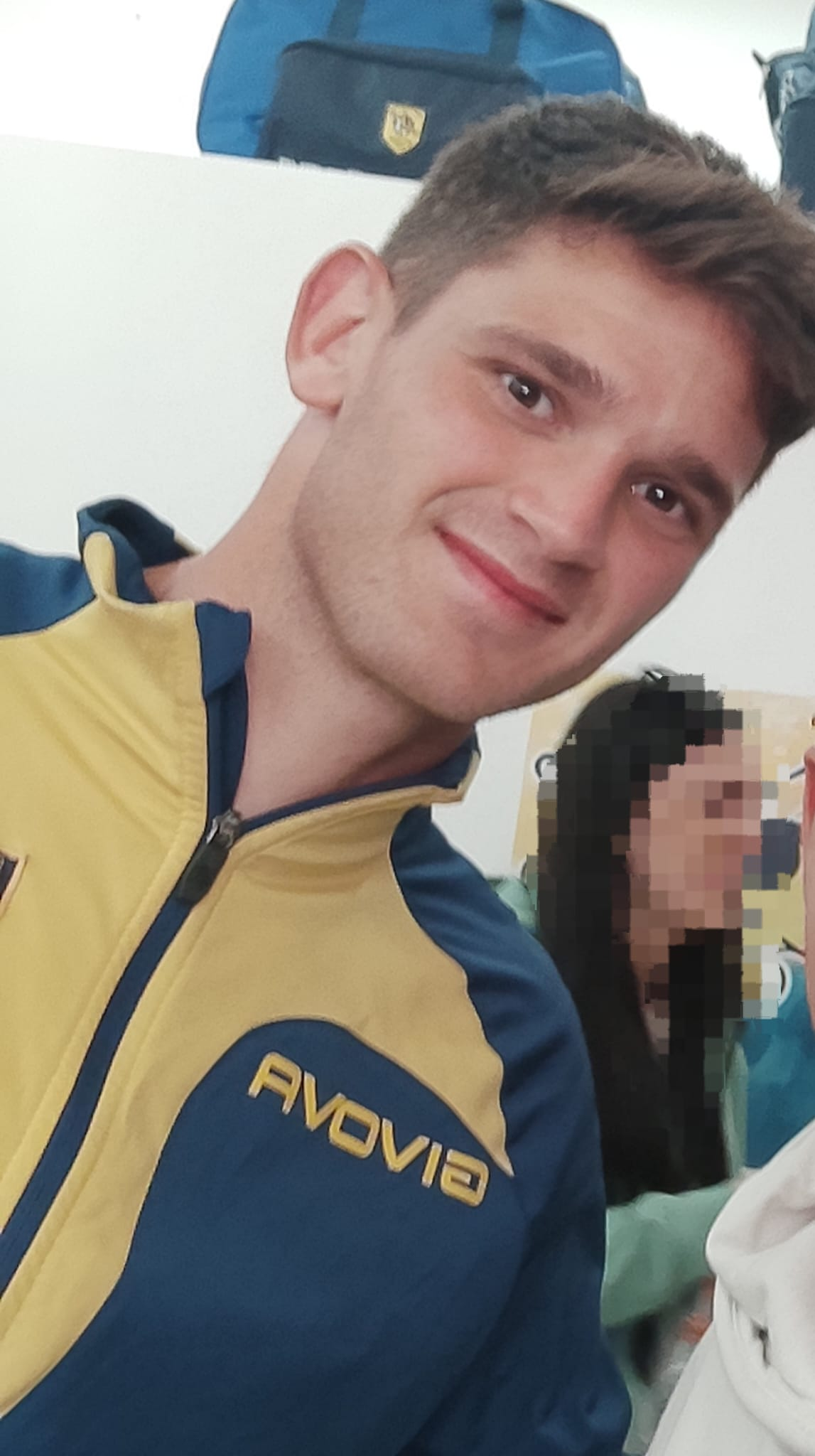

Personal information
- Date of birth: 5 February 2000 (age 26)
- Place of birth: Parma, Italy
- Height: 1.84 m (6 ft 0 in)
- Position: Forward

Team information
- Current team: Venezia
- Number: 9

Youth career
- –2015: Parma
- 2015–2019: Inter Milan
- 2019–2020: Parma

Senior career*
Years	Team	Apps	(Gls)
2019–2022	Parma	1	(0)
2021	→ Virtus Francavilla (loan)	17	(1)
2021–2022	→ ACR Messina (loan)	31	(8)
2022–2024	Triestina	43	(10)
2024–2025	Juve Stabia	51	(27)
2025–	Venezia	33	(17)

International career^{‡}
2015	Italy U15	7	(1)
2015	Italy U16	4	(0)
- * Club domestic league appearances and goals as of 12 May 2026 ‡ National team caps and goals as of 28 September 2020

Andrea Adorante (born 5 February 2000) is an Italian professional footballer who plays as a forward for Serie A club Venezia.

== Club career ==
Adorante started football at Parma Calcio, the club of his native town, before joining Inter Milan. There he was instrumental in Inter Milan's several youth team achievements, but despite figuring several times on the bench with the first team, he never made his professional debut and was undermined by severe injuries.

After coming back to Parma on the summer 2019, Adorante made his professional debut for Parma on 5 December 2019, in a Coppa Italia game against Frosinone, starting in his side's 2–1 win.

Adorante made his Serie A debut on 28 September 2020, playing the last 10 minutes of a 4–1 win against Bologna. On 28 October 2020, he scored his first goal as a professional, Parma's third in a 3–1 cup win against Pescara.

On 23 January 2021, Adorante joined Serie C side Virtus Francavilla on loan for the remainder of the season. On 2 August 2021, he moved on loan to ACR Messina.

On 13 July 2022, Adorante signed a three-year contract with Triestina.

On 4 January 2024, Adorante moved to Juve Stabia on loan with a conditional obligation to buy.

On 12 July 2025, Adorante joined Venezia.

== Career statistics ==
As of match played on 24 January 2026

Appearances and goals by club, season and competition
Club	Season	League			Coppa Italia		Other		Total	
Club	Season	Division	Apps	Goals	Apps	Goals	Apps	Goals	Apps	Goals
Parma	2019–20	Serie A	0	0	1	0	—		1	0
Parma	2020–21	Serie A	1	0	3	1	—		4	1
Parma	Total		1	0	4	1	0	0	5	1
Virtus Francavilla (loan)	2020–21	Serie C	17	1	0	0	—		17	1
Messina (loan)	2021–22	Serie C	31	8	0	0	2 (Note: Appearances in Coppa Italia Serie C)	1	33	9
Triestina	2022–23	Serie C	31	6	0	0	3 (Note: One appearance in Coppa Italia Serie C, two appearances in Serie C relegation play-outs)	0	34	6
Triestina	2023–24	Serie C	12	4	0	0	3	3	15	7
Triestina	Total		43	10	0	0	6	3	49	13
Juve Stabia (loan)	2023–24	Serie C	18	12	0	0	2 (Note: Appearances in Supercoppa di Serie C)	1	20	13
Juve Stabia	2024–25	Serie B	33	15	0	0	3 (Note: Appearances in Serie B promotion play-offs)	2	36	17
Juve Stabia	Total		51	27	0	0	5	3	56	30
Venezia	2025–26	Serie B	19	11	2	0	—		21	11
Career total			162	56	6	1	13	7	180	64
