= Rufai Mohammed =

Ghanaian footballer

Personal information
- Date of birth: 15 March 2006 (age 20)
- Place of birth: Ghana
- Height: 6 ft 3 in (1.91 m)
- Position: Centre-back

Team information
- Current team: Venezia (on loan from IF Elfsborg)
- Number: 16

Youth career
- –2024: Inter Allies

Senior career*
| Years | Team | Apps | (Gls) |
| 2024– | IF Elfsborg | 15 | (0) |
| 2025 | → IFK Värnamo (loan) | 16 | (2) |
| 2026– | → Venezia (loan) | 0 | (0) |
- * Club domestic league appearances and goals as of 29 August 2026

Rufai Mohammed (born 15 March 2006) is a Ghanaian professional footballer who plays as a centre-back for Serie A club Venezia, on loan from Allsvenskan club IF Elfsborg.

== Career ==
Mohammed was brought from Ghanaian club Inter Allies to Sweden in the spring of 2024. He trained with the senior team of IF Elfsborg, but only played matches for the U19 team. Following a trial at Östers IF, Mohammed was therefore loaned out to fellow Allsvenskan team IFK Värnamo in 2025. From the start, he was benched here too, but that changed after Arne Sandstø took over as manager. He then established himself in Värnamo, also scoring his first Allsvenskan goal in August 2025 and his second in October 2025, though the team were haplessly relegated.

In 2026, Mohammed returned to Elfsborg, and immediately started playing as well as scoring in the 2025–26 Svenska Cupen. There were also rumours about transfer bids from clubs abroad.

On 1 September 2026, Mohammed joined Italian Serie A club Venezia on loan for the 2026–27 season, with an option to make the move permanent.

== Personal life ==
Mohammed is a Muslim.
