= Ale Gomes =

Spanish footballer

Personal information
- Full name: Alejandro Gomes Furtado
- Date of birth: 14 February 2008 (age 18)
- Place of birth: Zaragoza, Spain
- Height: 1.85 m (6 ft 1 in)
- Position: Centre-back

Team information
- Current team: Venezia
- Number: 95

Youth career
- CPI Río Sena
- Amistad
- 2018–2025: Zaragoza

Senior career*
| Years | Team | Apps | (Gls) |
| 2025 | Zaragoza B | 8 | (0) |
| 2025–2026 | Zaragoza | 13 | (0) |
| 2026– | Venezia | 0 | (0) |

International career
| 2025– | Spain U18 | 2 | (0) |
- * Club domestic league appearances and goals as of 9 June 2026

Alejandro "Ale" Gomes Furtado (born 14 February 2008) is a Spanish professional footballer who plays for Serie A club Venezia. Mainly a centre-back, he can also play as a full-back.

== Early and personal life ==
Gomes' parents Arlindo and María were born in Cape Verde and emigrated to Miralbueno, a neighborhood in Zaragoza, in the 1990s. Ale and his two older brothers Ismael and Nilton (who are also footballers) were all born in the city.

== Club career ==
=== Zaragoza ===
After starting it out at CPI Río Sena, a local school in his neighborhood, Gomes played for UD Amistad before joining Real Zaragoza's youth sides at the age of ten. He made his senior debut with the latter's reserves on 7 September 2025, starting in a 2–0 Segunda Federación home win over Gernika Club.

Already established in the B-side, Gomes made his first team debut on 29 October 2025, playing the full 90 minutes in a 3–1 away win over UD Mutilvera, for the season's Copa del Rey. He made his professional debut four days later, starting in a 2–0 Segunda División home loss to Deportivo de La Coruña.

=== Venezia ===
On 9 July 2026, Serie A side Venezia FC announced the signing of Gomes on a six-year contract.

== International career ==
Eligible to play for Spain and Cape Verde, Gomes was called up to the former's under-18 team for a friendly tournament on 1 October 2025.
