= Sjoerd Overgoor =

Dutch footballer (born 1988)

Personal information
- Full name: Sjoerd Overgoor
- Date of birth: 6 September 1988 (age 38)
- Place of birth: Enschede, Netherlands
- Height: 1.82 m (6 ft 0 in)
- Position: Midfielder

Youth career
- VV DEO
- VV Reünie
- Twente

Senior career*
| Years | Team | Apps | (Gls) |
| 2007–2012 | De Graafschap | 38 | (1) |
| 2012 | → Go Ahead Eagles (loan) | 10 | (1) |
| 2012–2015 | Go Ahead Eagles | 97 | (2) |
| 2015–2016 | Cambuur | 22 | (2) |
| 2016–2017 | Haladás | 7 | (0) |
| 2017–2019 | Go Ahead Eagles | 37 | (0) |
| 2019–2021 | TOP Oss | 23 | (0) |
| Total | | 234 | (6) |
- * Club domestic league appearances and goals

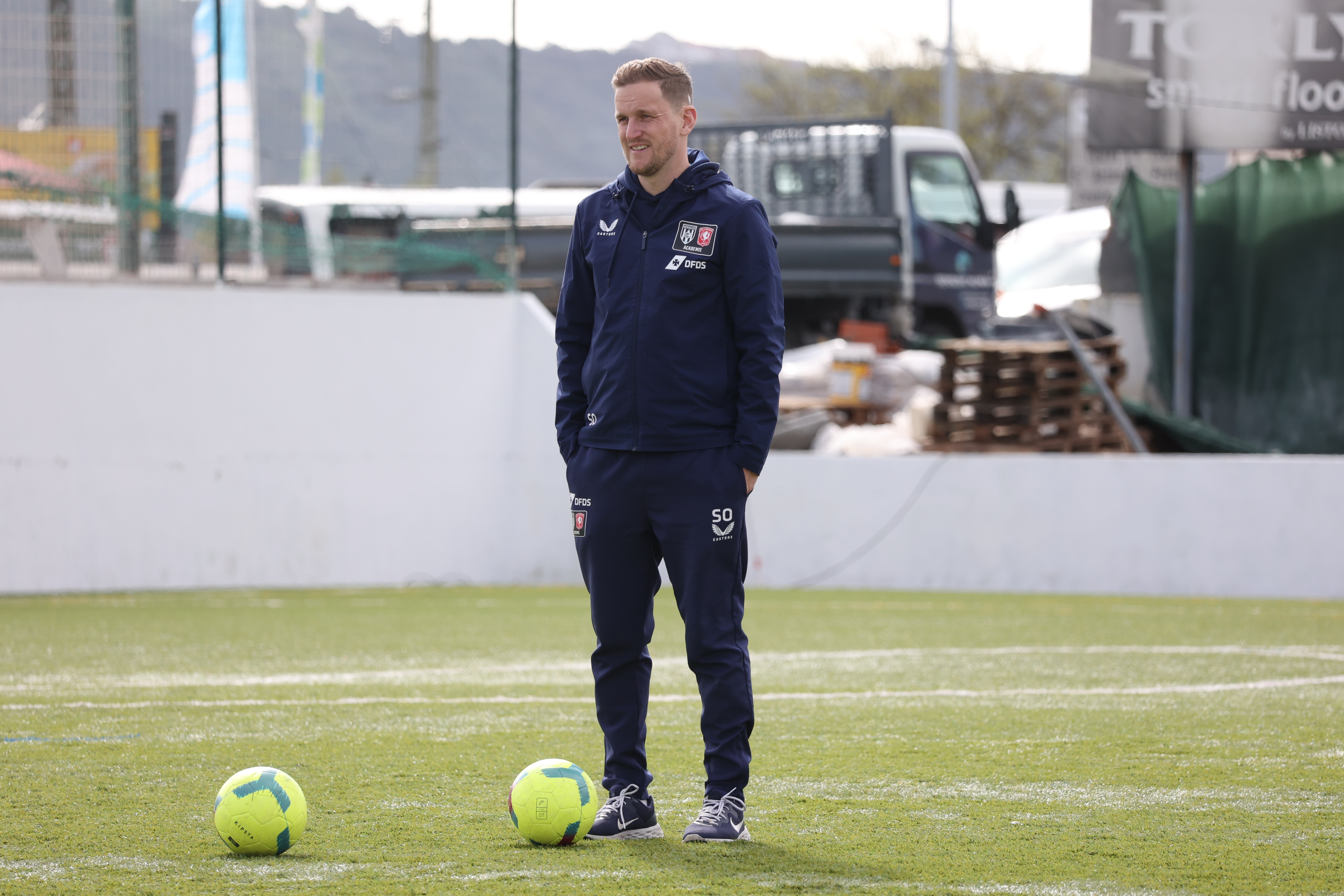
Sjoerd Overgoor

Sjoerd Overgoor (born 6 September 1988) is a Dutch former professional footballer. He played for De Graafschap, Go Ahead Eagles, Szombathelyi Haladás and TOP Oss. He will join HSC '21 from the 2021–22 season, and work as a youth coach for Twente.

== Club career ==
Overgoor moved to the youth academy of FC Twente after playing for VV DEO and VV Reünie. From there, he went to De Graafschap, for whom he made his professional debut on 14 August 2009 in a match against FC Eindhoven. He won the Eerste Divisie title with the club in his debut season. Overgoor scored his first league goal on 24 November 2010, the winner, in a 0–1 win over Willem II. He had come on as a 57th minute substitute for Rydell Poepon.

Overgoor moved from De Graafschap to Go Ahead Eagles on 31 January 2012, who initially loaned him on a six-month deal and afterwards signed him on a permanent contract in the summer of 2012. He experienced another promotion to the Eredivisie with that club – this time via the 2012–13 promotion play-offs.

After Go Ahead Eagles were relegated back to the second division in the 2014–15 season, Overgoor left for SC Cambuur. There, he was assigned number 8. Overgoor was appointed captain of Cambuur after one match, after his predecessor Etiënne Reijnen left for FC Groningen. He also suffered relegation in the 2015–16 season with Cambuur from the Eredivisie. Overgoor himself would, however, not play in a lower division again. Instead, in June 2016, he signed a three-year contract with Hungarian club Szombathelyi Haladás, who the previous season had finished fifth in the Nemzeti Bajnokság I, the highest tier. There, he became a teammate with fellow Dutch player, Sjoerd Ars.

On 12 July 2017, Overgoor returned to the Netherlands and Go Ahead Eagles. He moved to TOP Oss on 31 January 2019. He announced his retirement from professional football on 2 March 2021, after suffering a knee injury in practice. Instead, he would continue as a youth coach for Twente and play at amateur level for HSC '21.

== Honours ==
De Graafschap

- Eerste Divisie: 2009–10
