= Daníel Leó Grétarsson =

Icelandic footballer (born 1995)

Personal information
- Full name: Daníel Leó Grétarsson Schmidt
- Date of birth: 2 October 1995 (age 31)
- Place of birth: Keflavík, Iceland
- Height: 1.85 m (6 ft 1 in)
- Position: Centre-back

Team information
- Current team: AGF
- Number: 3

Senior career*
Years	Team	Apps	(Gls)
2012–2014	Grindavík	49	(5)
2015–2020	Aalesund	105	(5)
2020–2022	Blackpool	15	(0)
2022–2023	Śląsk Wrocław	32	(1)
2023–2026	Sønderjyske	77	(6)
2026–	AGF	2	(0)

International career^{‡}
2013–2014	Iceland U19	10	(0)
2015–2016	Iceland U21	6	(1)
2020–	Iceland	37	(0)
- * Club domestic league appearances and goals as of 26 September 2026 ‡ National team caps and goals as of 16 November 2026

Daníel Leó Grétarsson Schmidt (born 2 October 1995) is an Icelandic professional footballer who plays as a centre-back for Danish Superliga club AGF and the Iceland national team. He has previously played for Grindavík, Aalesund, Blackpool, Śląsk Wrocław and Sønderjyske.

== Club career ==
On 12 November 2014, Daníel signed a three-year contract with Norwegian Tippeligaen side Aalesunds FK.

On 5 October 2020, Daníel joined Blackpool in the English Football League for an undisclosed fee.

Daníel signed for Śląsk Wrocław on 27 January 2022 for an undisclosed fee. After 1.5 years in Poland, he moved to Denmark and joined Danish 1st Division club SønderjyskE on 26 June 2023, signing a deal until June 2027.

On 2 September 2026, transfer deadline-day, he joined fellow Danish Superliga side AGF on a three-year contract.

== International career ==
Daníel has represented Iceland at U19 and U21 level.

He was called up to the senior team for the first time in September 2019 when he joined the squad for the Euro 2020 qualifiers against Moldova and Albania.

== Career statistics ==
=== Club ===
As of match played 20 September 2026

Appearances and goals by club, season and competition
Club	Season	League			National cup (Note: Includes Icelandic Cup, Norwegian Cup, FA Cup, Polish Cup, Danish Cup)		League cup (Note: Includes Icelandic League Cup, EFL Cup)		Continental		Total	
Club	Season	Division	Apps	Goals	Apps	Goals	Apps	Goals	Apps	Goals	Apps	Goals
Grindavík	2012	Úrvalsdeild	6	1	0	0	5	0	—		11	1
Grindavík	2013	1. deild karla	21	3	2	1	7	2	—		30	6
Grindavík	2014	1. deild karla	22	1	1	0	7	1	—		30	2
Grindavík	Total		49	5	3	1	19	3	0	0	71	9
Aalesund	2015	Tippeligaen	8	0	2	0	—		—		10	0
Aalesund	2016	Tippeligaen	12	0	2	0	—		—		14	0
Aalesund	2017	Eliteserien	27	1	4	0	—		—		31	1
Aalesund	2018	OBOS-ligaen	15	1	0	0	—		—		15	1
Aalesund	2019	OBOS-ligaen	29	3	2	0	—		—		31	3
Aalesund	2020	Eliteserien	14	0	0	0	—		—		14	0
Aalesund	Total		105	5	10	0	0	0	0	0	115	5
Blackpool	2020–21	League One	12	0	2	0	0	0	1 (Note: Appearance in EFL Trophy)	0	15	0
Blackpool	2021–22	Championship	3	0	0	0	1	0	0	0	15	0
Blackpool	Total		15	0	2	0	1	0	0	0	18	0
Śląsk Wrocław	2021–22	Ekstraklasa	4	0	0	0	—		—		4	0
Śląsk Wrocław	2022–23	Ekstraklasa	28	1	3	0	—		—		31	1
Śląsk Wrocław	Total		32	1	3	0	0	0	0	0	35	1
Sønderjyske	2023–24	Danish 1st Division	23	3	0	0	—		—		23	3
Sønderjyske	2024–25	Danish Superliga	22	1	1	0	—		—		23	1
Sønderjyske	2025–26	Danish Superliga	27	2	1	0	—		—		28	2
Sønderjyske	2026–27	Danish Superliga	5	0	—		—		—		5	0
Sønderjyske	Total		77	6	2	0	0	0	0	0	79	6
AGF	2026–27	Danish Superliga	2	0	1	0	0	0	—		3	0
Career total			283	17	21	1	20	3	1	0	325	21

=== International ===
As of match played 16 November 2026

Appearances and goals by national team and year
National team	Year	Apps	Goals
Iceland
Iceland	2020	1	0
Iceland	2021	4	0
Iceland	2022	7	0
Iceland	2023	1	0
Iceland	2024	9	0
Iceland	2025	7	0
Iceland	2026	8	0
Total		37	0
