= Alessio Pozzi =

Italian model (born 1995)

- Born: 29 August 1995 (age 31); Capriolo, Italy
- Occupation: Model
- Modeling information
- Height: 6 ft 2.5 in (1.89 m)
- Hair color: Brown
- Eye color: Brown

Alessio Pozzi (born 29 August 1995) is an Italian fashion model. He has worked internationally for fashion houses including Dolce & Gabbana, Calvin Klein, Versace, Givenchy, Emporio Armani and Moschino. He has also appeared in advertising campaigns and editorials for international fashion publications.

== Early life and discovery ==
Pozzi was born in Capriolo, in the province of Brescia, Lombardy, Italy. He was discovered while visiting a shopping centre near Bergamo for a dental appointment. A photographer working in the shopping centre noticed him and subsequently invited him to attend meetings in Milan to assess his suitability for fashion modelling.

Pozzi began working as a model around 2013 and was subsequently represented by Elite Model Management.

== Career ==
Pozzi began appearing in international fashion shows during the early 2010s. By 2016, he had worked for several major fashion houses, including Dolce & Gabbana, Givenchy and Calvin Klein. He was also photographed alongside models and celebrities including Irina Shayk, Bella Hadid, Candice Swanepoel and Courtney Love.

In February 2016, Corriere della Sera reported that Pozzi was one of the protagonists of Dolce & Gabbana's worldwide advertising campaign for its spring/summer 2016 collection. The newspaper also described him as one of the most sought-after Italian models of the period.

During the 2016 men's fashion season, Pozzi appeared on the runways of Philipp Plein, Emporio Armani and Bikkembergs.

In January 2016, Vogue included Pozzi in a feature on Italian male models during Milan Men's Fashion Week. The publication described him as one of modelling's "current It boys" and noted his runway work for Calvin Klein, Moschino and Brioni.

Vogue subsequently included Pozzi in a June 2016 feature examining the prospects of the next generation of male supermodels.

In January 2018, Corriere della Sera described Pozzi as a veteran of the international men's fashion runways and noted his work in Emporio Armani Eyewear advertising and editorials for major fashion magazines.

In January 2019, Corriere della Sera identified Pozzi among the notable models expected to participate in Milan Men's Fashion Week and reported that he had appeared in fashion editorials and the Emporio Armani Eyewear campaign. He also appeared in a Moschino show in Rome that month.

In March 2019, Vanity Fair Italia profiled Pozzi alongside fellow Italian models Federico Spinas and Fabio Mancini. The article described Pozzi as one of the prominent Italian models of the period and discussed his international runway career for Dolce & Gabbana, Versace, Givenchy and Calvin Klein.
