= Antonio Casas (footballer) =

Spanish footballer (born 2000)

Personal information
- Full name: Antonio Manuel Casas Marín
- Date of birth: 30 March 2000 (age 26)
- Place of birth: La Rambla, Spain
- Height: 1.83 m (6 ft 0 in)
- Position: Forward

Team information
- Current team: Sporting Gijón (on loan from Venezia)
- Number: 17

Youth career
- 2009–2010: La Rambla
- 2010–2015: Séneca
- 2015: La Rambla
- 2015–2016: Séneca
- 2016–2018: Real Madrid
- 2018–2019: Sevilla

Senior career*
| Years | Team | Apps | (Gls) |
| 2018–2021 | Sevilla B | 26 | (4) |
| 2019–2020 | Sevilla C | 18 | (11) |
| 2021–2025 | Córdoba | 139 | (48) |
| 2025– | Venezia | 24 | (3) |
| 2026– | → Sporting Gijón (loan) | 0 | (0) |

International career
| 2019 | Spain U19 | 1 | (0) |
- * Club domestic league appearances and goals as of 12 May 2026

Antonio Manuel Casas Marín (born 30 March 2000) is a Spanish professional footballer who plays as a forward for Segunda División club Sporting Gijón, on loan from Serie A club Venezia.

== Club career ==
Born in La Rambla, Córdoba, Andalusia, Casas represented La Rambla CF and Séneca CF before agreeing to join Real Madrid's La Fábrica on 4 February 2016. He moved to Sevilla FC in 2018, and made his senior debut with the reserves on 4 November of that year, in a 3–1 Segunda División B home win over FC Jumilla.

Casas scored his first senior goal on 22 December 2018, netting the opener for Sevilla Atlético in a 2–1 home win over CD Badajoz. He spent the 2019–20 campaign with the C-team in Tercera División, scoring 11 goals in just 18 appearances.

On 9 July 2020, Casas renewed his contract with the Nervionenses until 2022, and returning to the B-team. After featuring rarely during the season, he was deemed surplus to requirements in June 2021, and signed a two-year deal with Córdoba CF in Segunda División RFEF on 6 July.

On 9 June 2022, after scoring 17 goals as the Blanquiverdes achieved promotion to Primera Federación, Casas renewed his contract until 2025. He was also the club's top scorer in the 2023–24 campaign, netting 15 times overall and promoting to Segunda División.

Casas made his professional debut on 16 August 2024, coming on as a second-half substitute for Nikolay Obolskiy in a 1–0 away loss to CD Mirandés. He scored his first professional goal ten days later, netting the opener in a 2–2 home draw against Burgos CF.

On 2 June 2025, Casas departed the Blanquiverdes as his contract was due to expire, and signed a three-year contract with Venezia FC in Italy on 13 July. On 23 August 2026, he returned to Spain after agreeing to a one-year loan deal with Sporting de Gijón, with an option to buy.

== International career ==
On 8 January 2019, Casas was called up to the Spain national under-19 team for a friendly against Italy.
