= Ridgeciano Haps =

Surinamese footballer (born 1993)

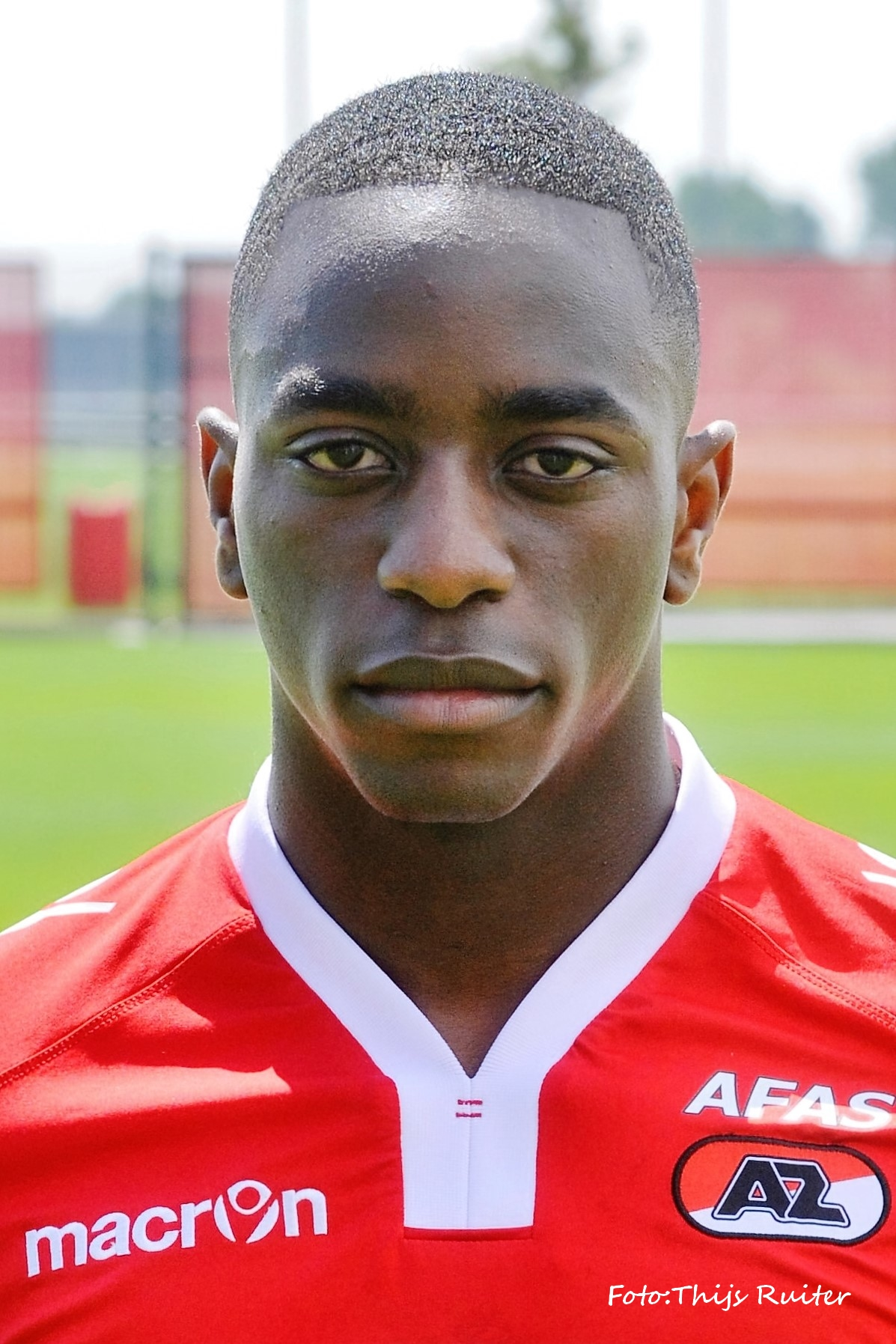
- Haps with AZ in 2015

Personal information
- Full name: Ridgeciano Delano Leandro Haps
- Date of birth: 12 June 1993 (age 33)
- Place of birth: Utrecht, Netherlands
- Height: 1.76 m (5 ft 9 in)
- Position: Left-back

Team information
- Current team: Venezia
- Number: 5

Youth career
- Zwaluwen Vooruit
- Elinkwijk
- AZ
- AFC
- AZ

Senior career*
Years	Team	Apps	(Gls)
2013–2017	AZ	77	(3)
2014	→ Go Ahead Eagles (loan)	10	(0)
2017–2021	Feyenoord	71	(5)
2021–	Venezia	94	(8)
2023–2024	→ Genoa (loan)	21	(0)

International career^{‡}
2021–	Suriname	28	(2)
- * Club domestic league appearances and goals as of 12 May 2026 ‡ National team caps and goals as of 18 November 2025

Ridgeciano Delano Leandro Haps (born 12 June 1993) is a professional footballer who plays as a left-back for Serie A club Venezia. Born in the Netherlands, he plays for the Suriname national team.

== Club career ==
Born in Utrecht, Haps is of Surinamese descent. He came through the youth system of AZ where he established himself as a consistent performer at left-back in the Eredivisie.

In summer 2017, he joined Feyenoord. On 22 April 2018, he played as Feyenoord won the 2017–18 KNVB Cup final 3–0 against AZ Alkmaar.

On 31 August 2021, after making exactly 100 competitive appearances for Feyenoord, Haps joined newly promoted Serie A club Venezia in a permanent deal. At home in matchday 12, Haps acrobatically defused a header by Eldor Shomurodov on the goal line against Roma. An important moment, because the home team took over the game in the remainder of the second half.

On 31 January 2023, Haps moved on loan to Genoa, with an option to buy. On 29 August 2023, the loan to Genoa was renewed for the 2023–24 season.

== International career ==
On 4 June 2021, Haps made his international debut for Suriname against Bermuda. He provided an assist in the 6–0 win. A few weeks later on 25 June, he was called up to the squad for the 2021 CONCACAF Gold Cup. He scored his first international goal for Suriname on 12 October 2023 in a 1–1 draw Nations League match against Haiti. He scored his second and latest goal for the National team of Suriname on 15 October 2024 in a 5–1 win match of the Concacaf Nations League against Guyana.

== Career statistics ==
=== Club ===
As of match played 25 May 2025

Appearances and goals by club, season and competition
Club	Season	League			National Cup (Note: Includes KNVB Cup, Coppa Italia)		Europe		Other		Total	
Club	Season	Division	Apps	Goals	Apps	Goals	Apps	Goals	Apps	Goals	Apps	Goals
AZ	2013–14	Eredivisie	2	0	2	1	1 (Note: Appearance(s) in UEFA Europa League)	0	—		5	1
AZ	2014–15	Eredivisie	18	0	3	0	—		—		21	0
AZ	2015–16	Eredivisie	27	3	2	0	7	0	—		36	3
AZ	2016–17	Eredivisie	30	0	4	0	12	1	3 (Note: Appearance(s) in Eredivisie play-off)	0	49	1
AZ	Total		77	3	11	1	20	1	3	0	111	5
Go Ahead Eagles (loan)	2013–14	Eredivisie	10	0	0	0	—		—		10	0
Feyenoord	2017–18	Eredivisie	23	0	4	0	4 (Note: Appearance(s) in UEFA Champions League)	0	1 (Note: Appearance(s) in Johan Cruyff Shield)	0	32	0
Feyenoord	2018–19	Eredivisie	9	0	1	0	0	0	0	0	10	0
Feyenoord	2019–20	Eredivisie	16	2	1	1	8	0	—		25	3
Feyenoord	2020–21	Eredivisie	21	3	2	0	3	1	2	0	28	4
Feyenoord	2021–22	Eredivisie	1	0	0	0	4 (Note: Appearance(s) in UEFA Conference League)	0	—		5	0
Feyenoord	Total		70	5	8	1	19	1	3	0	100	7
Venezia	2021–22	Serie A	25	1	0	0	—		—		25	1
Venezia	2022–23	Serie B	19	1	0	0	—		—		19	1
Venezia	2024–25	Serie A	25	1	0	0	—		—		25	1
Venezia	Total		69	3	0	0	—		—		69	3
Genoa (loan)	2022–23	Serie B	5	0	0	0	—		—		5	0
Genoa (loan)	2023–24	Serie A	16	0	2	1	—		—		18	1
Genoa (loan)	Total		21	0	2	1	—		—		23	1
Career total			247	11	21	3	39	2	6	0	313	16

== Honours ==
Feyenoord

- KNVB Cup: 2017–18
- Johan Cruijff Shield: 2017, 2018

Venezia

- Serie B: 2025–26
