= Antoine Hainaut =

French footballer (born 2002)

Personal information
- Date of birth: 18 February 2002 (age 24)
- Place of birth: Boulogne-sur-Mer, France
- Height: 1.87 m (6 ft 2 in)
- Position: Midfielder

Team information
- Current team: Venezia
- Number: 18

Youth career
- 2010–2020: Lens

Senior career*
Years	Team	Apps	(Gls)
2020	Boulogne B	5	(0)
2021–2022	Boulogne	30	(1)
2022–2025	Parma	42	(2)
2025–	Venezia	43	(7)
- * Club domestic league appearances and goals as of 18:28, 12 October 2026 (UTC)

Antoine Hainaut (born 18 February 2002) is a French professional footballer who plays as a midfielder for Serie A club Venezia.

== Career ==
Hainaut was born on 18 February 2002 in Boulogne-sur-Mer, France. He is a native of Sainte-Catherine, France. In 2010, Hainaut joined the youth academy of French side Lens at the age of seven. He started his senior career with French side US Boulogne. On 6 August 2021, he debuted for the club during a 1–1 draw with Chambly. On 13 August 2021, he scored his first goal for the club during a 3–1 win over Red Star. He made thirty league appearances and scored one goal while playing for the club. He also played for their reserve team. In 2022, he signed for Italian side Parma. On 17 September 2022, he debuted for the club during a 3–1 win over Ascoli. He helped the club win the Serie B league.

On 16 August 2025, Hainaut signed a three-season contract with Venezia in Serie B.
