= List of foreign Serie B players =

This is a list of foreign players in Serie B of the Italian football league system. The following players:

1. have played at least one Serie B game for the respective club;
2. have not been capped for the Italy national team on any level, independently from the birthplace, except for players born in San Marino and active in the Italy national team before the first official match of the Sammarinese national team played on November 14, 1990 and players of Italian formation born abroad of Italian parents;
3. have been born in Italy and were capped by a foreign national team. This includes players who have dual citizenship with Italy.

These are all the teams that have had at least a foreign player while playing in a Serie B season and in bold are the ones currently playing for the 2026–27 season :

AlbinoLeffe, Alessandria, Alzano Virescit, Ancona, Arezzo, Ascoli, Atalanta, Avellino, Bari, Benevento, Bologna, Brescia, Cagliari, Carpi, Carrarese, Castel di Sangro, Catania, Catanzaro, Cesena, Chievo, Cittadella, Como, Cosenza, Crema, Cremonese, Crotone, Empoli, Entella, Fanfulla Lodi, Feralpisalò, Fermana, Fidelis Andria, Fiorentina, Foggia, Frosinone, Gallipoli, Genoa, Gubbio, Juve Stabia, Juventus, Lanciano, Latina, Lazio, Lecce, Lecco, Legnano, Licata, Livorno, Lucchese, Maceratese, Magenta Mantova, Messina, Milan, Modena, Monza, Napoli, Nocerina, Novara, Padova, Palermo, Parma, Perugia, Pescara, Piacenza, Pisa, Pordenone, Portogruaro, Pistoiese, Pro Patria, Pro Vercelli, Reggiana, Reggina, Rimini, Roma, Salernitana, Sambenedettese, Sampdoria, Sassuolo, Siena, SPAL, Spezia, Südtirol, Taranto, Ternana, Torino, Trapani, Treviso, Triestina, Udinese, Varese, Venezia, Verona, Vicenza, Voghera.

These are the only teams that have participated in Serie B but have not had a foreign player: Acireale, Alba Roma, Barletta, Biellese, Bolzano, Brindisi, Campobasso, Casale, Cavese, Centese, Derthona, Fiumana, Forlì, Massese, Matera.

In bold are the players who are currently playing in Serie B.

== Albania ==
- Alessio Abibi – Perugia – 2022–23
- Arlind Ajeti – Reggiana – 2020–21
- Naser Aliji – Entella – 2017–18
- Nedim Bajrami – Empoli, Sassuolo – 2019–21, 2024–25
- Migjen Basha – Rimini, Frosinone, Atalanta, Torino, Como, Bari – 2007–12, 2015–18
- Ervin Bashi – Catanzaro – 2025–26
- Etrit Berisha – SPAL – 2020–21
- Sebahudin Biçaku – Voghera – 1945–47
- Brayan Boci – Genoa – 2022–23
- Erjon Bogdani – Reggina, Salernitana, Verona – 2001–02, 2003–05
- **Kleis Bozhanaj** – **Modena**, Carrarese, Reggiana – 2023–
- Edgar Cani – Ascoli, Padova, Modena, Carpi, Bari, Catania, Pisa – 2008–11, 2013–15, 2016–17
- Marvin Çuni – Frosinone, Sampdoria, Bari – 2024–26
- Kastriot Dermaku – Cosenza, Lecce – 2018–19, 2020–22
- Berat Djimsiti – Avellino – 2016–17
- Entonjo Elezaj – Perugia – 2016–17
- Andrea Filipi – Alessandria – 2021–22
- Brayan Gjyla – Feralpisalò – 2023–24
- Luis Hasa – Carrarese – 2025–26
- Kevin Haveri – Ascoli – 2023–24
- Elseid Hysaj – Empoli – 2012–14
- Elvis Kabashi – Pescara, Como, Reggiana – 2013–14, 2021–25
- Sergio Kalaj – Frosinone – 2021–23, 2024–25
- Elhan Kastrati – Pescara, Trapani, Cittadella – 2018–25
- Aristidi Kolaj – Alessandria – 2021–22
- Erdis Kraja – Ascoli, Pescara – 2023–24, 2025–26
- Marash Kumbulla – Verona – 2018–19
- Naim Krieziu – Napoli – 1948–50
- Dean Liço – Ascoli – 2020–21
- Sllave Llambi – Fanfulla Lodi – 1942–43
- Azdren Llullaku – Entella – 2017–18
- Rey Manaj – Pisa – 2016–17
- Agon Mehmeti – Novara – 2012–13
- Hysen Memolla – Salernitana – 2018–19
- Ledian Memushaj – Portogruaro, Carpi, Pescara – 2010–11, 2013–16, 2017–21
- **Silvio Merkaj** – **Südtirol**, **Vicenza** – 2023–
- Zylyf Muça – Brescia – 2024–25
- Florian Myrtaj – Verona, Catanzaro – 2003–06
- Emanuele Ndoj – Brescia, Cosenza – 2016–19, 2020–24
- Harallamb Qaqi – Carpi – 2013–14
- **Armand Rada** – **Vicenza** – 2026–
- Fabio Sakaj – Modena – 2014–16
- Romeo Shahinas – Latina – 2015–16
- **Cristian Shpendi** – **Cesena** – 2024–
- **Stiven Shpendi** – Carrarese, **Empoli** – 2024–
- Thomas Strakosha – Salernitana – 2015–16
- Armando Vajushi – Livorno, Pro Vercelli, Avellino – 2015–18
- Frédéric Veseli – Empoli, Salernitana, Benevento, Südtirol – 2017–18, 2019–21, 2022–23, 2024–26
- Giacomo Vrioni – Venezia, Cittadella, Cesena – 2018–20, 2025–26

== Algeria ==
- Najib Ammari – Latina, Entella, Spezia – 2014–18
- Samir Beloufa – Monza – 1999–2000
- Ismaël Bennacer – Empoli – 2017–18
- **Mehdi Dorval** – Bari, **Catanzaro** – 2022–
- Mohamed Farès – Verona, Brescia – 2016–17, 2023–24
- Farès Ghedjemis – Frosinone – 2024–26
- Abdelkader Ghezzal – Crotone, Bari, Latina, Como – 2005–07, 2012–14, 2015–16
- **Mehdi Léris** – Brescia, **Pisa** – 2021–22, 2024–25, 2026–
- Djamel Mesbah – Avellino, Lecce – 2008–10
- Mourad Meghni – Bologna – 2006–07
- **Karim Zedadka** – Ascoli, Südtirol, **Empoli** – 2023–

== Andorra ==
- Ildefons Lima – Triestina – 2005–09

== Angola ==
- Zito Luvumbo – Como, Cagliari – 2021–23
- Rui Modesto – Palermo – 2025–26
- Givestin N'Suki – Juve Stabia – 2011–12
- M'Bala Nzola – Carpi, Trapani, Spezia – 2017–18, 2019–20

== Antigua and Barbuda ==
- DJ Buffonge – Spezia – 2019–20

== Australia ==
- John Aloisi – Cremonese – 1996–97
- Mark Birighitti – Varese – 2014–15
- Mark Bresciano – Empoli – 1999–2002
- Joshua Brillante – Como – 2015–16
- Alessandro Circati – Parma – 2021–24
- Gabriel Cleur – Entella – 2016–17, 2020–21
- Christian Esposito – Albinoleffe – 2008–09
- Bruno Fornaroli – Sampdoria – 2011–12
- Vincenzo Grella – Empoli, Ternana – 1999–2002
- Ajdin Hrustic – Salernitana – 2024–25
- Zeljko Kalac – Perugia – 2004–05
- Chris Ikonomidis – Salernitana – 2015–16
- Fran Karačić – Brescia – 2020–23
- Adrian Madaschi – Portogruaro – 2010–11
- Jahce Novello – Cosenza – 2023–25
- Paul Okon – Vicenza – 2003–04
- Nick Rizzo – Ancona, Ternana – 2000–02
- Danny Tiatto – Salernitana – 1996–97
- Carl Valeri – Grosseto, Sassuolo, Ternana – 2007–14
- Jess Vanstrattan – Verona – 2004–06
- Cristian Volpato – Sassuolo – 2024–25
- Max Vieri – Ancona, Verona, Napoli, Ternana, Triestina, Arezzo – 2000–06

== Austria ==
- Muhammet Akagündüz – Verona – 2006–07
- Peter Artner – Foggia – 1997–98
- Marko Božić – Frosinone – 2021–22
- **Matthias Braunöder** – Como, Bari, **Carrarese** – 2023–24, 2025–
- Flavius Daniliuc – Salernitana – 2024–25
- Dieter Elsneg – Frosinone – 2008–09
- György Garics – Napoli, Bologna – 2006–07, 2014–15
- Robert Gucher – Frosinone, Vicenza, Pisa – 2008–11, 2014–15, 2016–17, 2019–22
- Michael Hatz – Reggiana – 1997–98
- Stefan Ilsanker – Genoa – 2022–23
- Arnel Jakupović – Empoli – 2017–18
- Engelbert König – Messina – 1950–52
- Marlon Mustapha – Como – 2023–24
- Markus Pavic – Entella – 2020–21
- Thomas Pichlmann – Grosseto, Verona, Spezia – 2007–13
- Jürgen Prutsch – Livorno – 2010–13
- Jürgen Säumel – Torino, Brescia – 2009–10
- David Schnegg – Crotone – 2021–22
- Roman Schramseis, Jr. – Udinese – 1947–49
- Renny Smith – Vicenza – 2016–17
- Lukas Spendlhofer – Varese, Ascoli – 2013–14, 2020–21
- Srđan Spiridonović – Vicenza – 2014–15
- Marko Stankovic – Triestina – 2008–10
- Michael Svoboda – Venezia – 2020–21, 2022–24, 2025–26
- Maximilian Ullmann – Venezia – 2022–23
- Daniel Wolf – Piacenza – 2007–11

== Azerbaijan ==
- **Lorenzo Mezzotero** – **Sampdoria** – 2026–

== Belarus ==
- Sergei Aleinikov – Lecce – 1991–92
- Vitali Kutuzov – Avellino, Pisa, Parma, Bari – 2003–04, 2007–09
- Vital Rahozhkin – Siena – 2001–02
- Mikhail Sivakov – Piacenza – 2009–10

== Belgium ==
- Hemsley Akpa-Chukwu – Bari – 2023–24
- Arnor Angeli – Avellino – 2014–15
- Walter Baseggio – Treviso – 2006–07
- Roberto Bisconti – Monza – 1997–98
- Gilbert Bodart – Brescia, Ravenna – 1998–2001
- Abdelhakim Bouhna – Latina – 2014–15
- Maxime Busi – Parma – 2021–22
- Luis Pedro Cavanda – Torino, Bari – 2010–12
- Moutir Chajia – Novara, Ascoli, Entella, Como – 2016–20, 2021–24
- Elias Cobbaut – Parma – 2021–23
- Gaëtan Coucke – Sampdoria – 2025–26
- Marc Emmers – Perugia – 1997–98
- Xian Emmers – Cremonese – 2018–19
- Corentin Fiore – Palermo – 2017–18
- Daam Foulon – Benevento – 2021–23
- Jean-François Gillet – Monza, Bari, Treviso, Catania – 1999–2000, 2001–09, 2014–15
- Michaël Goossens – Genoa – 1996–97
- Marco Ingrao – Vicenza – 2005–06
- Benoît Ladrière – Avellino – 2013–14
- Mats Lemmens – Lecco – 2023–24
- **Jean-Pierre Longonda** – **Mantova** – 2026–
- Jordan Lukaku – Vicenza – 2021–22
- Donovan Maury – Juve Stabia – 2011–13
- Lukas Mondele – Modena – 2023–24
- Gaby Mudingayi – Torino, Pisa – 2004–05, 2016–17
- Radja Nainggolan – Piacenza, SPAL – 2005–10, 2022–23
- Nicolas Napol – Avellino – 2015–16
- Pierre-Yves Ngawa – Avellino, Perugia, Foggia – 2017–19
- Maecky Ngombo – Ascoli – 2018–19
- Mardochee Nzita – Perugia, Pescara – 2019–21
- Luis Oliveira – Como, Catania, Venezia – 2001–05
- Stephane Omeonga – Avellino, Pescara – 2016–17, 2020–21
- Daouda Peeters – Südtirol – 2023–24
- Olivier Renard – Modena – 2004–05
- Cédric Roussel – Brescia – 2006–07
- Richie Sagrado – Venezia – 2025–26
- Joël Schingtienne – Venezia – 2025–26
- Tony Sergeant – Bari – 2007–08
- Mohamed Soumarè – Avellino – 2014–17
- **Jari Vandeputte** – Vicenza, Catanzaro, **Cremonese** – 2020–21, 2023–25, 2026–
- **Yari Verschaeren** – **Sampdoria** – 2026–
- Matthias Verreth – Brescia, Bari – 2024–26
- Bruno Versavel – Perugia – 1997–98
- Johan Walem – Torino, Catania – 2003–05
- Reno Wilmots – Avellino, Carpi – 2017–19

== Bosnia-Herzegovina ==
- Mustafa Arslanović – Ascoli – 1990–91
- Riad Bajić – Ascoli, Brescia – 2020–22
- Adrian Leon Barišić – Frosinone – 2021–22
- Gordan Bunoza – Pescara – 2014–16
- **Milan Đurić** – Cesena, Ascoli, Crotone, Trapani, Cittadella, Salernitana, **Cremonese** – 2007–08, 2009–12, 2013–14, 2015–17, 2018–21, 2026–
- Dennis Hadžikadunić – Sampdoria – 2025–26
- Mato Jajalo – Palermo, Venezia – 2017–19, 2022–24
- Davor Jozić – Cesena – 1991–93
- **Eman Košpo** – **Mantova** – 2026–
- Rade Krunić – Empoli – 2017–18
- Zoran Kvržić – Spezia – 2015–16
- Andrej Modić – Vicenza, Brescia – 2015–17
- Tarik Muharemović – Sassuolo – 2024–25
- Vedin Music – Como, Modena, Torino, Treviso – 2001–02, 2004–08
- Zlatan Muslimović – Pistoiese, Ascoli – 2001–03
- Enis Nadarević – Varese, Cesena, Bari, Trapani, Novara – 2010–16
- Sanjin Prcić – Perugia – 2015–16
- Dario Šarić – Carpi, Ascoli, Palermo, Cesena – 2017–19, 2020–25
- Blaz Sliskovic – Pescara – 1993–94
- Marko Topić – Monza – 1998–2000

== Bulgaria ==
- Valentin Antov – Monza, Cremonese – 2021–22, 2023–26
- Valeri Bojinov – Lecce, Juventus, Verona, Vicenza, Ternana, Pescara – 2002–03, 2006–07, 2012–13, 2014–15, 2019–20
- **Rosen Bozhinov** – **Pisa** – 2026–
- Ivaylo Chochev – Palermo – 2017–19
- Krassimir Chomakov – Ravenna – 2000–01
- Andrey Galabinov – Livorno, Avellino, Novara, Spezia, Reggina – 2010–11, 2013–17, 2018–20, 2021–23
- Andrea Hristov – Cosenza – 2018–19, 2021–22, 2024–25
- Petko Hristov – Venezia, Spezia – 2022–26
- Atanas Iliev – Ascoli – 2021–22
- Radoslav Kirilov – Carpi – 2013–14
- **Andrey Krastev** – **Sampdoria** – 2026–
- Dimo Krastev – Catanzaro, Feralpisalò – 2023–24
- Vladislav Mirchev – Ancona – 2009–10
- Adrian Raychev – Frosinone – 2025–26
- Pavel Vidanov – Trapani – 2014–15
- Petar Zhabov – Cosenza – 1998–2001

== Burkina Faso ==
- Yves Benoit Bationo – Empoli – 2012–13
- Salif Dianda – Verona, Ternana – 2006–07, 2012–16
- **Abdoul Guiebre** – Modena, Bari, **Ascoli** – 2023–24, 2026–

== Cameroon ==
- Steve Leo Beleck – Crotone – 2014–15
- Jean-Claude Billong – Benevento, Foggia, Salernitana – 2018–20
- Joseph Bouasse – Vicenza – 2016–17
- Mack Bono – Ternana – 2004–06
- Daniel Chigou – Ternana – 2001–02
- Joss Didiba – Perugia – 2015–17
- Steeve Gerard Fankà – Ascoli – 2008−09
- Patrice Feussi – Genoa, Pisa – 2002–03, 2007–09
- Divine Fonjock – Treviso – 2008–09
- Antonio Ghomsi – Genoa, Salernitana, Avellino – 2002–05, 2008–09
- Samuel Ipoua – Torino – 1996–97
- Jonathan Italeng – Südtirol – 2025–26
- Thomas Herve Job – Sampdoria, Pescara, Cremonese, Ascoli, Pisa, Grosseto, Cittadella – 2001–02, 2004–06, 2007–12
- Daniel Maa Boumsong – Treviso – 2006–07
- Kelvin Matute – Cesena, Triestina, Crotone, Pro Vercelli – 2009–11, 2012–16
- Albert Meyong – Ravenna – 1998–99
- Joseph Minala – Bari, Latina, Salernitana – 2014–19
- Lilian Njoh – Salernitana – 2024–25
- Jean-Pierre Nsame – Como – 2023–24
- Frank Ongfiang – Palermo – 2002–03
- Louisse Parfait – Piacenza, Crotone, Ascoli, Cesena – 2009–13
- Laurent Sanda – Genoa – 2001–02
- Thomas Som – Grosseto – 2012–13
- Hilarie Tankoua – Crotone – 2000–01
- Pierre Wome – Lucchese – 1997–98
- Francis Zé – Sampdoria – 2002–03

== Canada ==
- **Ismael Cajazzo** – **Mantova** – 2026–
- Enzo Concina – Cesena, Piacenza, Monza – 1984–85, 1987–90
- Axel Desjardins – Spezia – 2019–20
- Ricardo Ferreira – Empoli – 2012–13
- Andrea Lombardo – Atalanta – 2005–06
- Rocco Placentino – Avellino – 2003–04
- Julian Uccello – Crotone – 2010–12

== Cape Verde ==
- Alessio Da Cruz – Novara, Parma, Spezia, Ascoli, Vicenza, Feralpisalò – 2017–20, 2021–22, 2023–24
- **Dailon Livramento** – **Verona** – 2026–
- **Vasco Lopes** – **Südtirol** – 2026–

== Chad ==
- **Franck Tchaouna** – **Catanzaro** – 2026–
- **Franky Tchaouna** – **Catanzaro** – 2026–

== Chile ==
- Carlos Carmona – Reggina, Atalanta – 2009–11
- Nicolas Cordova – Crotone, Bari, Ascoli, Messina, Grosseto, Brescia – 2001–05, 2007–10, 2011–12
- Nicolás Corvetto – Triestina – 2009–10
- Pablo Galdames – Genoa – 2022–23
- Julio Gutiérrez – Messina, Pescara – 2001–04
- Luis Antonio Jiménez – Ternana – 2002–06
- Marcelo Larrondo – Siena – 2010–11
- **Felipe Loyola** – **Pisa** – 2026–
- Mauricio Pinilla – Grosseto – 2009–10
- Sebastián Pinto – Varese – 2010–11
- Luis Rojas – Crotone – 2021–22
- Mario Salgado – Verona, Ternana, Brescia, Albinoleffe, Avellino, Torino – 2002–03, 2004–06, 2007–08, 2009–10
- Felipe Seymour – Spezia – 2013–14
- Francisco Sierralta – Parma, Empoli – 2017–18, 2019–20
- Jorge Toro – Modena – 1964–69, 1970–71
- Jaime Valdes – Bari, Lecce – 2001–04, 2006–07
- Diego Valencia – Salernitana – 2024–25
- Jorge Vargas – Reggina, Empoli – 2001–02, 2008–09
- Alex Von Schwedler – Bari – 2002–05

== Colombia ==
- Jorge Bolaño – Modena – 2007–09
- Damir Ceter – Chievo, Pescara, Bari – 2019–21, 2022–23
- Ricardo Chará – Empoli – 2010–12
- Miguel Guerrero – Bari – 1996–97
- Gonzalo Martínez – Napoli – 2003–04
- **Daniel Mosquera** – **Verona** – 2026–
- Jonny Mosquera – Livorno – 2014–15
- Yeferson Paz – Perugia, Sassuolo, Reggiana – 2022–23, 2024–26
- Brayan Perea – Perugia – 2014–15
- Andrés Tello – Cagliari, Bari, Benevento, Salernitana – 2015–16, 2017–20, 2021–23, 2024–25
- Devis Vásquez – Ascoli – 2023–24
- Brayan Vera – Cosenza, Lecce – 2020–22
- Jherson Vergara – Avellino, Livorno – 2014–16
- Alexis Zapata – Perugia – 2015–17

== Congo ==
- Gabriel Charpentier – Reggina, Ascoli, Frosinone, Parma – 2020–24
- **Antoine Makoumbou** – Cagliari, **Sampdoria** – 2022–23, 2026–
- Dominique Malonga – Cesena, Vicenza, Pro Vercelli – 2009–10, 2012–13, 2015–17
- Yves Pambou – Reggina – 2013–14

== DR Congo ==
- Samuel Bastien – Avellino – 2015–16
- Brian Bayeye – Ascoli – 2023–24
- Pedro Kamata – Bari, Siena – 2007–09, 2010–11
- Christian Kanyengele – Savoia, Catania – 1999–2000, 2003–05
- Jason Mayélé – Cagliari – 2000–02
- Benjamin Mokulu – Avellino, Frosinone, Cremonese, Carpi – 2014–19
- Olivier N'Siabamfumu – Crotone – 2009–10
- Granddi Ngoyi – Palermo – 2013–14
- Samuel Ntanda-Lukisa – Sampdoria – 2023–24
- Charles Pickel – Cremonese – 2023–25

== Costa Rica ==
- Gilberto Martínez – Brescia – 2005–06, 2008–10, 2011–12
- Winston Parks – Ascoli – 2002–03
- Anco Marcio Vargas – Pisa – 1950–52

== Croatia ==
- Milan Badelj – Genoa – 2022–23
- Ricardo Bagadur – Salernitana, Benevento – 2015–17
- Andrija Balić – Perugia – 2019–20
- Zoran Ban – Pescara – 1996–97
- Saša Bjelanović – Genoa, Vicenza, Atalanta, Verona, Varese – 2003–04, 2008–14
- Luka Bogdan – Vicenza, Livorno, Salernitana, Ternana – 2016–17, 2018–24
- **Domagoj Bradarić** – Salernitana, **Verona** – 2024–25, 2026–
- Josip Brezovec – Spezia – 2014–16
- Petar Brlek – Ascoli – 2019–20
- Dražen Brnčić – Cremonese, Monza, Ancona, Venezia – 1998–2000, 2001–03
- Igor Bubnjić – Brescia – 2016–17
- Igor Budan – Empoli, Venezia, Ancona, Atalanta – 2000–01, 2002–04, 2005–06
- Ante Budimir – Crotone – 2015–16, 2018–19
- Karlo Butić – Pordenone, Cosenza, Feralpisalò – 2020–24
- Dario Čanađija – Spezia – 2014–16
- Vedran Celjak – Grosseto, Padova, Lecco – 2012–14, 2023–24
- Tibor Čiča – Cesena – 2012–13
- Antonio Čolak – Parma, Spezia – 2023–25
- Antonini Čulina – Spezia – 2013–15
- Borislav Cvetković – Ascoli – 1990–91
- Mario Cvitanović – Genoa, Napoli – 2002–04
- Niko Datković – Spezia – 2013–15, 2016–17
- Ivan Delić – Cosenza – 2022–23
- Damjan Đoković – Cesena, Livorno, Spezia – 2012–13, 2014–15, 2016–17
- Marko Dugandžić – Ternana – 2014–17
- Tomislav Erceg – Ancona – 1997–98
- Martin Erlić – Spezia – 2019–20
- Bartol Franjić – Venezia – 2025–26
- Tomislav Gomelt – Bari, Crotone – 2014–15, 2018–20
- Kristijan Ipša – Reggina – 2013–14
- Robert Jarni – Bari – 1992–93
- Ivan Javorčić – Brescia, Crotone – 1998–2001
- Marko Jordan – Latina – 2016–17
- Krunoslav Jurcic – Torino, Sampdoria – 2000–02
- Ante Matej Jurič – Brescia – 2024–25
- Roko Jureškin – Pisa, Benevento – 2022–24
- Ivan Jurić – Crotone, Genoa – 2001–02, 2004–07
- Stanko Jurić – Parma – 2021–23
- Ivan Kelava – Carpi – 2014–15
- Renato Kelić – Padova – 2013–14
- Ivan Kontek – Ternana – 2021–22
- Dario Knežević – Livorno – 2010–12
- Niko Kovač – Juventus – 2006–07
- Miljenko Kovačić – Brescia – 1996–97
- Anton Krešić – Trapani, Avellino, Cremonese, Carpi – 2016–19
- Tonći Kukoč – Brescia, Livorno, Como – 2013–14, 2015–16
- Antonio Lukanović – Novara – 2016–17
- Karlo Lulić – Frosinone, Bari – 2021–25
- Mirko Marić – Monza, Crotone – 2020–22, 2025–26
- Antonio Marin – Monza – 2020–21
- Ivan Martić – Spezia – 2015–16
- Kristjan Matošević – Cosenza – 2021–23
- Hrvoje Milić – Crotone – 2018–19
- Mato Miloš – Siena, Spezia, Perugia – 2013–16
- Josip Mišić – Spezia – 2015–16
- Mislav Oršić – Spezia – 2013–14
- Igor Ostopanj – Pistoiese – 2001–02
- Marko Pajač – Benevento, Perugia, Brescia, Genoa, Reggiana – 2016–18, 2020–24
- Manuel Pamić – Frosinone – 2014–15
- Bruno Petković – Varese, Entella, Trapani – 2014–17
- Tomi Petrović – Entella – 2017–18, 2020–21
- Josip Posavec – Palermo – 2017–18
- Franjo Prce – Salernitana, Brescia – 2015–17
- Ivan Rajčić – Bari, Frosinone – 2005–09
- Milan Rapaić – Perugia – 1997–98
- Marko Rog – Cagliari – 2022–23
- Tomislav Rukavina – Venezia – 2000–01, 2002–03
- Tomislav Šarić – Crotone – 2013–14
- Adrian Šemper – Chievo, Genoa, Como, Pisa – 2019–21, 2022–25
- **Lorenco Šimić** – Empoli, Lecce, Ascoli, Bari, **Avellino** – 2017–18, 2021–23, 2024–
- Mario Šitum – Spezia, Reggina, Cosenza, Catanzaro – 2014–16, 2020–22, 2023–25
- Dario Smoje – Monza, Ternana – 1998–2001
- Marin Šverko – Venezia – 2022–24, 2025–26
- Stjepan Tomas – Vicenza – 2001–02
- Goran Tomić – Reggina, Vicenza – 1998–2000
- Dalibor Višković – Vicenza – 2006–07
- Davor Vugrinec – Lecce, Atalanta, Catania – 2002–03, 2004–05
- Dragan Vukoja – Foggia, Genoa, Pescara – 1997–2001
- **Ante Vuković** – **Juve Stabia** – 2026–
- Ante Vukušić – Pescara – 2013–14, 2015–16
- Stipe Vulikić – Perugia, Sampdoria, Modena – 2022–23, 2024–26
- Tonči Žilić – Castel di Sangro, Verona, Siena – 1997–99, 2000–01
- Dario Župarić – Pescara – 2013–16

== Cyprus ==
- Nicholas Ioannou – Como, Sampdoria – 2021–26
- Andreas Karo – Salernitana – 2019–21
- **Grigoris Kastanos** – Pescara, Frosinone, **Verona** – 2019–21, 2026–

== Czech Republic ==
- Antonín Barák – Sampdoria – 2025–26
- Louis Buffon – Pisa – 2024–25
- **Daniel Fila** – Venezia, Empoli, **Avellino** – 2025–
- Jan Hable – Ascoli – 2009–10
- Jan Havlena – Entella – 2016–17
- David Heidenreich – SPAL – 2021–22
- Ondřej Herzán – Lecce, Spezia – 2006–08
- Jakub Jankto – Ascoli – 2015–16
- Marek Jankulovski – Napoli – 2001–02
- Martin Jiranek – Reggina – 2001–02
- Václav Koloušek – Salernitana, Fermana – 1997–98, 1999–2000, 2002–03
- Libor Kozák – Brescia, Bari, Livorno – 2009–10, 2017–19
- Edvard Lasota – Reggiana – 1998–99
- Martin Lejsal – Venezia – 2004–05
- Roman Macek – Bari, Cremonese – 2016–18
- Aleš Matějů – Brescia, Palermo, Spezia – 2018–19, 2020–26
- Pavel Nedvěd – Juventus – 2006–07
- Milan Nitrianský – Avellino – 2015–16
- Michael Rabušic – Perugia, Crotone – 2014–15
- Jaroslav Sedivec – Catania, Perugia, Crotone, Triestina, Mantova – 2002–10
- Stefan Šimić – Varese – 2014–15
- Tomáš Skuhravý – Genoa – 1995–96
- Pavel Srnicek – Cosenza – 2002–03
- Cestmir Vycpalek – Palermo, Parma – 1947–48, 1954–58
- Lukáš Zima – Livorno – 2018–20
- Jaromír Zmrhal – Brescia – 2020–21

== Denmark ==
- **Oliver Abildgaard** – Como, Pisa, **Sampdoria** – 2023–
- Magnus Kofod Andersen – Venezia – 2022–24
- Lennart Bak – Foggia – 1996–98
- Niels Bennike – Spal – 1950–51
- Klaus Berggreen – Pisa – 1984–85
- Martin Bergvold – Livorno – 2008–09
- Kurt Christensen – Catania – 1966–67
- Oliver Christensen – Salernitana – 2024–25
- Hans Colberg – Lucchese – 1952–53
- Riza Durmisi – Salernitana – 2020–21
- Thomas Fig – Padova – 1996–98
- Kai Frandsen – Lucchese – 1952–53
- Morten Frendrup – Genoa – 2022–23
- **Martin Frese** – **Verona** – 2026–
- Simon Graves – Palermo – 2022–24
- Christian Gytkjær – Monza, Venezia, Bari – 2020–22, 2023–24, 2025–26
- Karl Aage Hansen – Catania – 1955–57
- Thomas Helveg – Udinese – 1994–95
- Morten Hjulmand – Lecce – 2020–22
- Malthe Højholt – Pisa – 2024–25
- Daniel Jensen – Novara – 2012–13
- Andreas Jungdal – Cremonese – 2023–24
- Emil Kornvig – Cosenza, Cittadella – 2022–24
- Henrik Larsen – Pisa – 1992–93
- Martin Laursen – Verona – 1998–99
- Alexander Lind – Pisa – 2024–25
- Christian Lonstrup – Cagliari – 1997–98
- Henrik Meister – Pisa – 2024–25
- Søren Mussmann – Pro Vercelli – 2016–17
- Matti Lund Nielsen – Pescara, Verona, Perugia – 2012–15
- Marc Nygaard – Catania, Vicenza – 2003–04
- Jens Odgaard – Pescara – 2020–21
- Leif Petersen – Livorno – 1950–52
- John Sivebæk – Pescara – 1993–94
- Laurs Skjellerup – Sassuolo, Spezia – 2024–26
- **Tobias Slotsager** – **Verona** – 2026–
- Erling Sørensen – Modena – 1949–50
- Frederik Sørensen – Pescara, Ternana – 2020–24
- **David Stückler** – **Cremonese** – 2026–
- Thomas Thorninger – Perugia – 1997–98
- Magnus Troest – Parma, Atalanta, Varese, Virtus Lanciano, Novara, Juve Stabia – 2008–09, 2010–18, 2019–20
- Oliver Urso – Reggiana – 2024–25
- **Peter Vindahl** – **Sampdoria** – 2026–

== Dominican Republic ==
- Noam Baumann – Ascoli – 2022–23
- Edwards Vinicio Espinal – Crotone, Portogruaro, Pro Vercelli – 2006–07, 2010–11, 2012–13
- Elpys José Espinal – Atalanta, Cesena – 1999–2000, 2009–10
- **Marlon Mena** – **Arezzo** – 2026–
- Gianluigi Sueva – Cosenza – 2020–22

== Ecuador ==
- Bryan Cabezas – Avellino – 2017–18
- Erick Ferigra – Ascoli – 2019–20
- Damián Lanza – Arezzo – 2006–07
- **Kevin Varas** – **Padova** – 2025–
- John Yeboah – Venezia – 2025–26

== Egypt ==
- Ahmed Hegazy – Perugia – 2014–15
- Hany Said – Bari, Messina, Fiorentina – 2001–04

== England ==
- Charles Adcock – Padova, Triestina – 1948–49, 1950–51
- Gordon Cowans – Bari – 1986–88
- Tony Dorigo – Torino – 1997–98
- Daniel Oyegoke – Verona – 2026–27
- Frank Rawcliffe – Alessandria – 1949–50
- Paul Rideout – Bari – 1986–88
- Kris Thackray – Ancona – 2009–10

== Equatorial Guinea ==
- Pedro Obiang – Sampdoria, Sassuolo, Monza – 2011–12, 2024–26
- José Machín – Trapani, Brescia, Pescara, Monza, Frosinone – 2016–22, 2024–25

== Estonia ==
- Enar Jääger – Ascoli – 2009–10
- Tarmo Kink – Varese – 2012–13
- Georgi Tunjov – SPAL – 2021–23

== Faroe Islands ==
- **Andrias Edmundsson** – **Verona** – 2026–

== Finland ==
- Mehmet Hetemaj – Albinoleffe, Reggina – 2009–13
- Perparim Hetemaj – Brescia, Benevento, Reggina – 2009–10, 2019–20, 2021–22
- **Jesse Joronen** – Brescia, Venezia, **Palermo** – 2020–24, 2025–
- Niki Mäenpää – Venezia – 2020–21, 2022–23
- Sakari Mattila – Ascoli – 2009–10
- Tomi Petrescu – Ascoli – 2008–09
- **Joel Pohjanpalo** – Venezia, **Palermo** – 2022–
- Jonas Portin – Ascoli, Padova – 2009–12
- **Niklas Pyyhtiä** – Ternana, **Südtirol**, Modena – 2023–
- Henri Salomaa – Lecco – 2023–24
- Simon Skrabb – Brescia – 2020–21
- Jeremiah Streng – Ascoli – 2023–24
- Sauli Väisänen – Crotone, Chievo, Cosenza, Ascoli – 2018–24

== France ==
- Jeff Reine-Adélaïde – Salernitana – 2024–25
- **Ruben Akalé** – **Verona** – 2026–
- Kelvin Amian – Spezia – 2023–24
- Stredair Appuah – Palermo – 2024–25
- Thierry Audel – Triestina – 2007–08, 2009–10
- Florian Ayé – Brescia – 2020–23
- Abou Ba – Cosenza, Alessandria – 2020–22
- Alain Baclet – Lecce, Vicenza, Frosinone, Cosenza – 2009–13, 2018–19
- Mohamed Bahlouli – Cosenza – 2019–21
- **Fahem Benaïssa-Yahia** – **Mantova** – 2025–
- Bryan Bergougnoux – Lecce – 2009–10
- **Antoine Bernede** – **Verona** – 2026–
- Gady Beyuku – Modena – 2024–26
- Jonathan Biabiany – Modena, Trapani – 2007–09, 2019–20
- Côme Bianay Balcot – Mantova – 2025–26
- Philippe Billy – Lecce – 2002–03
- Alexis Blin – Lecce, Palermo – 2021–22, 2024–26
- Rodrigue Boisfer – Genoa, Venezia, Gubbio – 1998–2005, 2011–12
- Charles Boli – Vicenza – 2021–22
- Warren Bondo – Reggina – 2022–23
- Antoine Bonifaci – Torino – 1959–60
- Landry Bonnefoi – Messina – 2003–04
- Jean-Alain Boumsong – Juventus – 2006–07
- Sid-Ahmed Bouziane – Sampdoria – 2002–03
- Julien Brellier – Venezia, Salernitana – 2003–05
- Alexis Carra – Vicenza, Cittadella – 2009–12
- Yunes Chaib – Genoa – 2003–04
- Alexandre Coeff – Brescia – 2022–23
- Stephan Coquin – Genoa – 2000–02
- **Omar Correia** – Juve Stabia, **Pisa** – 2025–
- Jean-Christophe Coubronne – Novara – 2010–11
- Michaël Cuisance – Venezia – 2022–23
- Jean-Pierre Cyprien – Lecce, Crotone – 1998–99, 2000–01
- Wylan Cyprien – Parma – 2023–24
- Lucas Da Cunha – Como – 2022–24
- **Colin Dagba** – **Carrarese** – 2026–
- Sebastian De Maio – Brescia, Frosinone, Vicenza, Modena, Mantova – 2006–07, 2008–13, 2021–23, 2024–25
- Ali Dembélé – Venezia, Mantova – 2023–24, 2025–26
- Modibo Diakité – Pescara, Ternana, Bari – 2005–06, 2016–18
- Enzo Di Santantonio – Brescia – 2017–18
- Abdou Doumbia – Ascoli – 2010–11
- Mathieu Duhamel – Foggia – 2017–18
- Steeve-Mike Eboa Ebongue – Cosenza – 2021–22
- Jean Lambert Evans – Crotone – 2019–20
- Patrice Evra – Monza – 1999–2000
- **Ichem Ferrah** – **Pisa** – 2026–
- Jordan Ferri – Sampdoria – 2025–26
- Mohamed Fofana – Ravenna, Virtus Lanciano – 2007–08, 2012–14
- Nicolas Frey – Modena, Venezia, Chievo – 2005–08, 2017–18, 2019–20
- Christophe Galtier – Monza – 1997–98
- Valentin Gendrey – Lecce – 2021–22
- Gaël Genevier – Catania, Pisa, Torino, Siena, Livorno, Juve Stabia, Novara – 2003–04, 2007–14
- Guillaume Gigliotti – Novara, Empoli, Ascoli, Salernitana, Crotone, Chievo – 2010–11, 2012–13, 2017–21
- Maxime Giron – Avellino – 2015–16
- Eddy Gnahoré – Perugia, Palermo, Ascoli – 2016–18, 2023–24
- **Claudio Gomes** – **Palermo** – 2022–
- Prince-Désir Gouano – Virtus Lanciano – 2012–13
- Antoine Hainaut – Parma, Venezia – 2022–24, 2025–26
- Thomas Henry – Palermo – 2024–25
- Thomas Heurtaux – Salernitana – 2019–20
- Matthieu Huard – Brescia – 2021–24
- Sem Ogolong Kamana – Juve Stabia – 2012–13
- Issiaka Kamate – Modena – 2024–25
- **Yann Karamoh** – **Sampdoria** – 2026–
- Ibrahim Karamoko – Chievo – 2019–20
- **Sambaly Keïta** – **Mantova** – 2026–
- Abdoulay Konko – Crotone – 2004–06
- Mathis Lambourde – Reggiana – 2025–26
- Sabri Lamouchi – Genoa – 2004–05
- Loïck Landre – Pisa – 2016–17
- Laurent Lanteri – Novara – 2010–11
- Nicolas Laspalles – Lecce – 2002–03
- Mickaël Latour – Virtus Entella – 2014–15
- Gaëtan Laura – Cosenza – 2021–22
- Armand Laurienté – Sassuolo – 2024–25
- Vincent Laurini – Empoli – 2012–14
- **Andréa Le Borgne** – Avellino, **Verona** – 2025–
- **Jérémy Le Douaron** – **Palermo** – 2024–
- Matthias Lepiller – Verona, Novara – 2011–14
- **Maxime Leverbe** – Chievo, Pisa, Benevento, **Vicenza** – 2019–24, 2026–
- Robert Maah – Bari, Grosseto, Cittadella – 2005–06, 2008–09, 2011–13
- Zinédine Machach – Carpi, Crotone, Cosenza – 2018–20
- Andrew Marie-Sainte – Livorno – 2018–20
- Jean–Christophe Marquet – Genoa – 1998–99
- Yanis Massolin – Modena – 2025–26
- Nassim Mendil – Cosenza, Catania, Ascoli, Salernitana – 2001–03, 2004–05
- Jérémy Ménez – Reggina, Bari – 2020–24
- Arnauld Mercier – Fidelis Andria, Savoia, Cosenza – 1998–2001
- Hemza Mihoubi – Lecce – 2006–08
- François Modesto – Cagliari – 2000–04
- Mathieu Moreau – Ternana, Varese – 2004–05, 2010–12
- David Mounard – Gallipoli, Siena – 2009–11
- Ange Caumenan N'Guessan – Ternana – 2023–24
- Yannis Nahounou – Reggiana – 2024–25
- Hervin Ongenda – Chievo – 2019–20
- Rémi Oudin – Sampdoria, Catanzaro – 2024–26
- Julian Palmieri – Crotone – 2006–07
- Marc Pfertzel – Livorno – 2003–04
- Sébastien Piocelle – Crotone, Grosseto – 2005–08
- Kyllan Ramé – Foggia – 2017–19
- Julien Rantier – Vicenza, Albinoleffe, Verona, Piacenza – 2003–09
- Ihsan Sacko – Cosenza – 2020–21
- Richard-Quentin Samnick – Bari – 2013–14
- Christophe Sanchez – Venezia – 2002–03
- Aurélien Scheidler – Bari – 2022–24
- Ahmed Sidibé – Venezia – 2025–26
- Samuel Souprayen – Verona – 2016–17
- Ousmane Sy – Reggina – 2010–11
- Sanasi Sy – Salernitana, Cosenza – 2020–22
- Anthony Taugourdeau – Pisa, Albinoleffe, Trapani, Venezia, Vicenza – 2008–09, 2010–12, 2019–22
- Abdoulaye Touré – Genoa – 2022–23
- Lisandru Tramoni – Pisa – 2022–24
- **Matteo Tramoni** – Brescia, **Pisa** – 2021–25, 2026–
- Aliou Traoré – Parma – 2021–22
- Daouda Traoré – Bari – 2025–26
- David Trezeguet – Juventus – 2006–07
- Valentin Vanbaleghem – Perugia – 2021–22
- Kevin Vinetot – Crotone, Südtirol – 2010–13, 2022–24
- Arthur Yamga – Carpi, Pescara – 2017–18
- Abdallah Yaisien – Trapani – 2013–14
- Cyril Yapi – Como – 2003–04
- Jonathan Zebina – Juventus – 2006–07

== Gabon ==
- Catilina Aubameyang – Triestina – 2003–04
- Willy Aubameyang – Avellino – 2008–09
- Noha Lemina – Sampdoria – 2023–24
- Anthony Oyono – Frosinone – 2021–23, 2024–26
- Jérémy Oyono – Frosinone – 2024–26

== Gambia ==
- **Joseph Ceesay** – Cesena, **Empoli** – 2024–
- **Fallou Cham** – **Verona** – 2026–
- Ebrima Darboe – Sampdoria, Frosinone, Bari – 2023–26
- Lamin Jallow – Trapani, Cesena, Salernitana, Vicenza – 2016–21
- Sulayman Jallow – Ascoli – 2017–18
- Lamin Jawo – Carpi – 2016–17
- Musa Juwara – Crotone – 2021–22
- Kalifa Kujabi – Frosinone – 2022–23
- Kalifa Manneh – Perugia – 2021–22
- Abdoulie Ndow – Frosinone – 2025–26
- Ali Sowe – Juve Stabia, Pescara, Latina, Modena – 2013–16
- Bamba Susso – Pisa – 2020–21

== Georgia ==
- Davit Dighmelashvili – Siena – 2001–02
- Iva Gelashvili – Spezia – 2023–24
- Giorgi Kvernadze – Frosinone – 2024–26
- Luka Lochoshvili – Cremonese, Salernitana – 2023–25
- **Dachi Lordkipanidze** – Carrarese, **Cremonese** – 2025–
- Levan Mchedlidze – Empoli – 2010–14
- Irakli Shekiladze – Empoli, Latina – 2011–15
- Georgi Nemsadze – Reggiana – 1998–99

== Germany ==
- Oliver Bierhoff – Ascoli – 1992–95
- Manfred Binz – Brescia – 1996–97
- Albert Brülls – Modena – 1964–65
- Lennart Czyborra – Genoa – 2022–23
- Thomas Doll – Bari – 1996–97
- Stefan Effenberg – Fiorentina – 1993–94
- Salvatore Gambino – Trapani – 2013–14
- Giuseppe Gemiti – Genoa, Modena, Piacenza, Novara, Livorno, Bari – 2004–09, 2010–11, 2012–13, 2014–16
- André Gumprecht – Lecce – 1994–95
- Rudolf Kölbl – Padova, Genoa – 1962–64, 1965–66
- Oliver Kragl – Frosinone, Foggia, Benevento, Ascoli – 2016–21
- Lion Lauberbach – Venezia – 2025–26
- **Adin Ličina** – **Cremonese** – 2026–
- Lukas Mühl – Spezia – 2023–24
- Markus Münch – Genoa – 1998–99
- Shkodran Mustafi – Sampdoria – 2011–12
- Savio Nsereko – Brescia, Juve Stabia – 2007–09, 2011–12
- Vincenzo Palumbo – Fidelis Andria, Pescara, Palermo – 1995–96, 1997–2002
- Tobias Pachonik – Carpi – 2017–19
- Karl–Heinz Spikofski – Catania – 1956–57
- Jeremy Toljan – Sassuolo – 2024–25
- Idrissa Touré – Pisa – 2021–25

== Ghana ==
- Boadu Acosty – Juve Stabia, Carpi, Modena, Latina – 2012–13, 2014–17
- Bright Addae – Crotone, Ascoli, Juve Stabia – 2012–13, 2015–20
- Dominic Adiyiah – Reggina – 2010–11
- Felix Afena-Gyan – Cremonese – 2023–24
- Daniel Agyei – Juve Stabia – 2012–13
- Masahudu Alhassan – Novara, Latina, Perugia – 2012–17
- Moro Alhassan – Cesena, Vicenza – 2013–15
- Yaw Asante – Grosseto – 2009–13
- Nii Nortey Ashong – Spezia – 2013–14
- Patrick Asmah – Avellino – 2016–17
- Kwame Ayew – Lecce – 1994–95
- Ahmed Barusso – Rimini, Brescia, Torino, Livorno, Nocerina, Novara – 2006–07, 2009–13
- Abdallah Basit – Benevento – 2019–20
- Emmanuel Besea – Modena, Frosinone, Venezia – 2015–16, 2017–19
- Richmond Boakye – Sassuolo, Latina – 2011–13, 2015–17
- Kevin-Prince Boateng – Monza – 2020–21
- Raman Chibsah – Sassuolo, Benevento, Frosinone – 2012–13, 2016–18
- Isaac Cofie – Torino, Piacenza, Sassuolo – 2010–12
- Abeam Emmanuel Danso – Triestina – 2010–11
- Amadou Diambo – Pescara – 2019–21
- Isaac Donkor – Bari, Avellino, Cesena – 2015–18
- Godfred Donsah – Crotone – 2021–22
- Alfred Duncan – Livorno, Venezia – 2012–13, 2025–26
- Mark Edusei – Lecce, Cosenza, Piacenza, Torino, Bari – 1996–97, 1998–99, 2001–04, 2005–06, 2008–09
- **Caleb Ekuban** – Genoa, **Verona** – 2022–23, 2026–
- Bismark Ekye – Fiorentina – 2003–04
- Mohammed Gargo – Venezia, Genoa – 2002–03, 2004–05
- Bright Gyamfi – Benevento, Reggiana, Cosenza – 2016–17, 2018–22, 2023–24
- Asamoah Gyan – Modena – 2004–06
- **Emmanuel Gyasi** – Spezia, **Palermo** – 2018–20, 2025–
- **Gabriel Herzuah** – **Cremonese** – 2026–
- Edmund Hottor – Triestina, Virtus Lanciano – 2009–10, 2012–13
- Nii Lamptey – Venezia – 1996–97
- **Shaka Mawuli** – Südtirol, **Arezzo** – 2022–23, 2026–
- Davis Mensah – Pordenone, Mantova – 2021–22, 2024–26
- John Mensah – Genoa, Cremonese – 2001–02, 2005–06
- Isaac Ntow – Brescia, Como – 2013–16
- Desmond N'Ze – Verona, Avellino – 2006–07, 2008–09
- Moses Odjer – Catania, Salernitana, Trapani – 2014–20
- Evans Osei – Pro Vercelli – 2016–17
- Benjamin Owusu – Brescia – 2008–09
- Ibrahim Abdul Razak – Empoli – 2001–02
- Abubakari Sadicki – Vicenza – 2003–04
- Amidu Salifu – Vicenza, Modena, Perugia, Brescia – 2010–11, 2013–16
- Ransford Selasi – Pescara, Novara – 2013–17
- Nana Welbeck – Brescia – 2011–13

== Greece ==
- Giorgos Antzoulas – Cosenza – 2020–21
- Tasos Avlonitis – Ascoli – 2020–22
- Konstantinos Chrysopoulos – Mantova – 2025–26
- Christos Donis – Ascoli – 2020–21
- Giannis Fetfatzidis – SPAL – 2022–23
- Savvas Gentsoglou – Livorno, Spezia, Bari – 2012–14, 2015–16
- Panagiotis Giannopoulos – Venezia – 2004–05
- Giorgos Katidis – Novara – 2013–14
- Panos Katseris – Catanzaro – 2023–24
- Christos Kourfalidis – Cagliari, Feralpisalò, Cosenza – 2022–25
- Ilias Koutsoupias – Entella, Ternana, Benevento, Bari, Catanzaro, Frosinone – 2020–26
- Giorgos Kyriazis – Catania, Arezzo, Salernitana, Triestina – 2002–03, 2004–10
- Konstantinos Loumpoutis – Perugia – 2004–05
- Georgios Makris – Pisa – 2016–17
- Vaggelis Moras – Bologna, Verona, Bari – 2007–08, 2012–13, 2016–17
- Evangelos Nastos – Perugia, Vicenza, Ascoli – 2004–09
- Antonis Natsouras – Cremonese – 2005–06
- Dimitrios Nikolaou – Empoli, Spezia, Palermo, Bari – 2019–21, 2023–26
- Marios Oikonomou – Bologna, Bari – 2014–15, 2017–18
- Antonis Petropoulos – Bari – 2015–16
- Ioannis Potouridis – Novara – 2013–14
- **Antonis Siatounis** – Monza, **Benevento** – 2021–22, 2026–
- **Dimitris Sounas** – Perugia, Catanzaro, **Avellino** – 2021–22, 2023–24, 2025–
- Dimitrios Stavropoulos – Reggina – 2020–22
- Panagiotis Tachtsidis – Grosseto, Verona, Lecce – 2010–12, 2018–19, 2020–21
- Lambros Vangelis – Siena – 2001–02
- Georgios Vakouftsis – Ravenna – 2000–01
- Apostolos Vellios – Ascoli – 2020–21
- Dimitrios Vosnakidis – Bari – 2013–14
- Zisis Vryzas – Fiorentina, Torino – 2003–04, 2005–06
- Vasilios Zagaritis – Parma – 2021–24

== Guadeloupe ==
- Andreaw Gravillon – Pescara, Ascoli – 2017–20, 2025–26
- Raphael Mirval – Perugia – 2015–17
- **Kenny Mixtur** – **Südtirol** – 2026–

== Guinea ==
- Ismaël Karba Bangoura – Cesena – 2012–14
- Gaston Camara – Bari, Modena, Brescia – 2015–17
- Karamoko Cissé – Albinoleffe, Benevento, Bari, Verona, Carpi, Juve Stabia, Cittadella – 2008–12, 2016–21
- **Moustapha Cissé** – Pisa, Südtirol, **Carrarese** – 2022–23, 2026–
- Oumar Conté – Reggiana – 2025–26
- Amara Konaté – Perugia – 2019–20
- Mathias Pogba – Pescara – 2014–15

== Guinea Bissau ==
- Janio Bikel – Vicenza – 2021–22
- Abel Camará – Cremonese – 2017–18
- Idrissa Camará – Avellino – 2016–18
- Carlos Embaló – Carpi, Brescia, Palermo, Cosenza, Cittadella – 2014–16, 2017–19, 2022–23
- Ronaldo Vieira – Sampdoria – 2023–25

== Haiti ==
- Christopher Attys – Feralpisalò – 2023–24

== Honduras ==
- Edgar Alvarez – Pisa – 2008–09
- Julio César de León – Reggina, Fiorentina, Catanzaro, Avellino, Genoa, Parma, Torino – 2001–02, 2003–04, 2005–06, 2006–07, 2008–10
- Carlos Pavón – Napoli – 2001–03
- Rigoberto Rivas – Brescia, Reggina – 2017–18, 2020–23
- David Suazo – Cagliari – 2000–04

== Hungary ==
- Krisztián Adorján – Novara, Entella – 2015–17, 2019–20
- Botond Balogh – Parma – 2021–24
- Norbert Balogh – Palermo – 2017–18
- Zsolt Bognár – Frosinone – 2007–08
- Géza Boldizsár – Crema – 1946–48
- Csaba Csizmadia — Grosseto – 2008–09
- Lajos Détári – Bologna – 1991–92
- János Hrotkó – Pro Sesto – 1946–49
- Róbert Feczesin – Brescia, Ascoli, Padova – 2007–09, 2010–14
- Árpád Fekete – Como, Pro Sesto, Messina, Cagliari – 1964–49, 1951–53
- Attila Filkor – Grosseto, Sassuolo, Gallipoli, Triestina, Livorno, Bari, Pro Vercelli, Avellino – 2007–13, 2014–15
- János Füzér – Pisa – 1948–49
- Krisztián Kenesei – Avellino – 2007–08
- Mihály Kincses – Salernitana – 1952–54
- Vladimir Koman – Avellino, Sampdoria – 2008–09, 2011–12
- Lajos Kovács – Fanfulla Lodi – 1947–48
- Ádám Kovácsik – Reggina, Carpi – 2009–10, 2011–12, 2013–14
- Zsolt Laczkó – Sampdoria, Vicenza, Padova – 2011–14
- György Mogoy – Catania – 1949–50
- Ádám Nagy – Pisa, Spezia – 2021–26
- János Nehadoma – Livorno, Modena – 1932–33, 1936–37
- István Nyers – Lecco – 1958–60
- Gyula Polgar – Magenta – 1947–48
- Péter Rajczi – Pisa – 2007–08
- Tamás Sándor – Torino – 1997–98
- Ádám Simon – Bari – 2011–12
- Lóránd Szatmári – Avellino – 2008–09
- Sándor Szobel – Palermo – 1947–48
- László Szőke – Triestina, Brescia – 1957–58, 1959–61, 1962–63
- Krisztián Tamás – Varese, Spezia – 2014–17
- Gyula Tóth – Modena – 1950–51
- Mihail Uram – Spezia – 1949–51
- Jeno Vadkerti – Magenta – 1947–48
- Roland Varga – Brescia – 2009–10
- Ádám Vass – Brescia – 2007–10, 2011–12
- Tamás Vaskó – Avellino – 2008–09
- József Viola – Atalanta – 1930–31
- Mihály Vörös – Bari – 1950–51
- János Zorgo – Prato – 1947–48, 1949–50

== Iceland ==
- **Bjarki Steinn Bjarkason** – Venezia, **Südtirol** – 2020–21, 2023–24, 2025–
- Birkir Bjarnason – Pescara, Brescia – 2013–15, 2020–21, 2023–25
- Brynjar Ingi Bjarnason – Lecce – 2021–22
- Mikael Egill Ellertsson – SPAL, Venezia – 2021–24
- Hólmbert Aron Friðjónsson – Brescia – 2020–21
- Sveinn Aron Guðjohnsen – Spezia – 2018–20
- Albert Guðmundsson – Genoa – 2022–23
- Emil Hallfreðsson – Verona – 2011–13
- Þórir Jóhann Helgason – Lecce – 2021–22
- Hjörtur Hermannsson – Pisa, Carrarese – 2021–25
- Óttar Magnús Karlsson – Venezia – 2020–21
- Hörður Magnússon – Spezia, Cesena – 2013–14, 2015–16

== Indonesia ==
- Emil Audero – Venezia, Palermo – 2017–18, 2024–25
- Thom Haye – Lecce – 2018–19
- Jay Idzes – Venezia – 2023–24

== Ireland ==
- Aaron Connolly – Venezia – 2022–23
- **Matteo Egan** – **Empoli** – 2026–
- Liam Kerrigan – Como – 2022–24
- Senan Mullen – Mantova – 2025–26
- Paddy Sloan – Udinese, Brescia – 1949–51

== Iran ==
- Rahman Rezaei – Messina – 2003–04
- Jami Rafati – Livorno – 2015–16

== Iraq ==
- Marko Farji – Venezia – 2025–26

== Israel ==
- Tal Banin – Brescia – 1998–2000
- Shay Ben David – Trapani – 2019–20
- Yonatan Cohen – Pisa – 2021–23

== Ivory Coast ==
- Ghislain Akassou – Pistoiese, Siena – 2000–03
- Jean-Daniel Akpa Akpro – Salernitana – 2017–20
- Didier Angan – Verona – 2003–05
- Alain Behi – Catania – 2003–04
- Ange-Yoan Bonny – Parma – 2021–24
- Drissa Camara – Parma – 2021–24
- Souleymane Coulibaly – Grosseto – 2012–13
- Christian Demel – Cremonese – 2005–06
- Adama Diakité – Padova – 2011–12, 2013–14
- Serge Dié – Reggina – 1997–99
- Almamy Doumbia – Bari – 2008–09
- Souleyman Doumbia – Bari, Vicenza – 2016–17
- Jean-Armel Drolé – Perugia – 2015–17
- Adama Fofana – Brescia – 2007–08
- Cedric Gondo – Ternana, Salernitana, Cremonese, Ascoli, Reggiana – 2015–16, 2019–26
- Franck Kessié – Cesena – 2015–16
- Jean Romaric Kevin Koffi – Modena – 2007–10
- **N'dri Philippe Koffi** – **Catanzaro** – 2025–
- Yao Eloge Koffi – Crotone, Reggiana – 2015–16, 2020–21
- Axel Cedric Konan – Lecce – 2002–03, 2007–08
- Dramane Konaté – Pro Vercelli – 2016–18
- Ben Lhassine Kone – Cosenza, Crotone, Frosinone, Como – 2019–26
- Moussa Koné – Pescara, Varese, Avellino, Cesena, Frosinone – 2011–13, 2014–18
- Vincent Kouadio – Messina – 2007–08
- Cristian Kouamé – Cittadella – 2016–18
- **Christian Kouan** – Perugia, Cosenza, **Benevento** – 2017–20, 2021–23, 2024–25, 2026–
- Emmanuel Latte Lath – SPAL – 2021–22
- Christian Manfredini – Cosenza, Genoa, Chievo, Fiorentina – 1998–2002, 2003–04
- Siriki Sanogo – Benevento – 2018–20
- Alassane Sidibe – Cosenza, Ascoli – 2022–23
- Junior Tallo – Bari – 2012–13
- Abdoullaye Traoré – Perugia, Verona – 2016–17, 2018–19
- Chaka Traorè – Palermo – 2023–24
- Hamed Junior Traorè – Empoli – 2017–18
- Pierre Zebli – Perugia, Ascoli – 2014–17, 2018–19
- Marco Zoro – Salernitana, Messina – 1999–2004

== Japan ==
- Cy Goddard – Benevento – 2018–19

== Kenya ==
- McDonald Mariga – Parma, Latina – 2008–09, 2015–17

== Kosovo ==
- Indrit Mavraj – Bari – 2025–26
- Samir Ujkani – Novara, Palermo, Latina, Pisa, Cremonese – 2010–11, 2013–14, 2015–18
- Idriz Voca – Cosenza – 2021–24

== Latvia ==
- Raimonds Krollis – Spezia – 2023–24
- Dario Sits – Parma – 2021–23
- Sergejs Vorobjovs – Albinoleffe – 2011–12

== Liberia ==
- Mark Pabai – SPAL – 2021–22
- Zizi Roberts – Monza, Ravenna – 1997–99
- Brem Soumaoro – Livorno – 2018–19

== Libya ==
- **Ahmad Benali** – Brescia, Pescara, Crotone, Pisa, Bari, **Entella** – 2012–16, 2017–20, 2021–
- Jehad Muntasser – Triestina, Perugia, Treviso – 2002–05, 2006–07

== Liechtenstein ==
- Marcel Büchel – Gubbio, Lanciano, Bologna, Juve Stabia, Ascoli – 2011–12, 2013–15, 2019–24
- Mario Frick – Ternana – 2002–06
- Yanik Frick – Perugia – 2017–18

== Lithuania ==
- Marius Adamonis – Salernitana, Südtirol – 2017–18, 2020–21, 2024–26
- Tomas Danilevicius – Livorno, Avellino, Bologna, Grosseto, Juve Stabia – 2002–04, 2005–09, 2010–13
- Edgaras Dubickas – Lecce, Feralpisalò, Juve Stabia – 2018–19, 2020–21, 2023–25
- Titas Krapikas – Spezia, Ternana – 2019–20, 2021–22
- **Adrian Lickūnas** – **Cremonese** – 2026–
- Linas Mėgelaitis – Latina – 2016–17
- Vykintas Slivka – Ascoli – 2016–17
- Tomas Švedkauskas – Pescara, Ascoli – 2013–14, 2015–16
- Marius Stankevičius – Cosenza, Brescia – 2002–03, 2005–08
- Ovidijus Siaulys – Entella – 2025–26

== Luxembourg ==
- **Seid Korać** – Venezia, **Verona** – 2025–
- **Danel Sinani** – **Sampdoria** – 2026–

== Mali ==
- Mahamet Diagouraga – Modena – 2008–12
- Salim Diakité – Ternana, Palermo, Juve Stabia – 2021–26
- Woyo Coulibaly – Parma – 2021–24
- Souleymane Diamoutene – Lecce, Pescara – 2006–08, 2010–11, 2015–16
- Drissa Diarra – Lecce – 2006–08, 2009–10
- Ousmane Dramé – Padova, Ascoli – 2010–13
- Cheick Keita – Entella – 2015–17
- Amadou Konte – Spezia – 2007–08
- Aly Mallé – Ascoli – 2020–21
- Coli Saco – Bari – 2024–25
- Mamadou Samassa – Pescara – 2013–14
- Mohamed Sissoko – Ternana – 2016–17

== Malta ==
- Trent Buhagiar – Brescia – 2024–25
- Kevin Cannavò – Palermo – 2018–19
- Enrico Pepe – Salernitana – 2008–10
- Alexander Satariano – Frosinone – 2021–22

== Martinique ==
- Janis Antiste – Reggiana, Sassuolo – 2023–25
- Grégoire Defrel – Cesena, Modena – 2012–14, 2024–26
- Emmanuel Rivière – Cosenza – 2019–20

== Mauritania ==
- Souleymane Doukara – Juve Stabia – 2013–14

== Mexico ==
- Damián Ariel Álvarez – Reggina – 2001–02

== Moldova ==
- **Artur Ioniță** – Benevento, Pisa, Modena, Lecco, **Arezzo** – 2021–24, 2026–
- **Sergiu Perciun** – **Ascoli** – 2026–

== Montenegro ==
- Marko Bakić – Spezia – 2014–15
- Ivan Fatić – Vicenza, Salernitana, Empoli, Verona – 2008–09, 2011–13
- Sergej Grubač – Chievo – 2019–21
- Marko Janković – Crotone, SPAL – 2019–21
- Vukašin Poleksić – Lecce – 2002–03
- Filip Raičević – Vicenza, Bari, Pro Vercelli, Livorno – 2015–20
- **Bodin Tomašević** – **Mantova** – 2026–
- Mirko Vučinić – Lecce – 2002–03

== Morocco ==
- Jadid Abderrazzak – Brescia, Pescara, Bari, Salernitana, Grosseto, Entella – 2005–10, 2011–13, 2015–17
- Ismail Achik – Bari – 2023–24
- Jamal Alioui – Catania, Perugia, Crotone – 2004–07
- Rachid Arma – Torino, Vicenza – 2009–11
- Karim Azizou – Triestina – 2005–07
- Adam Bakoune – Monza – 2025–26
- Soufiane Bidaoui – Crotone, Latina, Avellino, Spezia, Ascoli, Frosinone – 2013–15, 2016–23
- Abdellah Boudouma – Cittadella – 2001–02
- Ouasim Bouy – Brescia – 2012–13
- **Walid Cheddira** – Bari, **Avellino** – 2021–22, 2026–
- Abdelaziz Dnibi – Palermo – 1996–97
- Malcom Edjouma – Bari – 2023–24
- Yassine Ejjaki – Reggina – 2021–22
- Omar El Kaddouri – Brescia – 2008–09, 2011–12
- **Hamza El Kaouakibi** – Pordenone, Benevento, **Südtirol** – 2021–
- Jawad El Yamiq – Perugia – 2018–19
- Oussama Essabr – Vicenza, Crotone – 2008–09, 2011–12
- Zouhair Feddal – Siena – 2013–14
- Ismail H'Maidat – Brescia, Como – 2013–15, 2021–22
- **Abdou Harroui** – **Verona** – 2026–
- Nabil Jaadi – Latina, Ascoli – 2014–15, 2016–17
- Yassine Jebbour – Varese – 2014–15
- Hicham Kanis – Novara – 2016–17
- **Yanis Khafi** – **Carrarese** – 2026–
- Houssine Kharja – Ternana, Piacenza – 2001–05, 2007–08
- Sofian Kiyine – Salernitana – 2017–18, 2019–21
- Achraf Lazaar – Varese, Palermo, Cosenza – 2012–14, 2019–20
- Youssef Maleh – Venezia – 2019–21
- Adam Masina – Bologna – 2014–15
- Hachim Mastour – Reggina – 2020–21
- Hicham Miftah – Catania – 2003–04
- Rachid Neqrouz – Bari – 2001–03
- Shady Oukhadda – Modena – 2022–24
- Abdelilah Saber – Napoli, Torino – 2001–04
- Abdelhamid Sabiri – Ascoli – 2020–22

== Netherlands ==
- Bobby Adekanye – Crotone – 2021–22
- Mario Been – Pisa – 1989–90
- **Don Bolsius** – **Ascoli** – 2026–
- Reda Boultam – Cremonese, Salernitana, Cosenza – 2018–22
- Jayden Braaf – Salernitana – 2024–25
- Sven Braken – Livorno – 2019–20
- Julian Brandes – Pescara – 2025–26
- Delano Burgzorg – Spezia – 2019–20
- Kees de Boer – Ternana – 2023–24
- **Terrence Douglas** – **Juve Stabia** – 2026–
- **Xavello Druiventak** – **Cesena** – 2026–
- Jay Enem – Venezia – 2022–24
- Leandro Fernandes – Pescara – 2020–21
- Maickel Ferrier – Salernitana – 1996–97
- Ronald Hoop – Palermo – 1995–96
- Jens Janse – Ternana – 2014–16
- Stefan Jansen – Salernitana – 1996–97
- Wim Kieft – Pisa – 1984–85
- Tom van de Looi – Brescia – 2020–24
- Rodney Kongolo – Cosenza – 2021–22
- Eli Louhenapessy – Genoa, Salernitana – 1997–98, 2001–02
- **Bjorn Meijer** – **Sampdoria** – 2026–
- Melle Meulensteen – Sampdoria – 2024–25
- **Bryant Nieling** – **Modena** – 2025–
- Reuven Niemeijer – Brescia – 2022–23
- Andries Noppert – Foggia – 2017–19
- Cas Odenthal – Como, Sassuolo, Bari – 2022–26
- Jayden Oosterwolde – Parma – 2021–23
- Jan Peters – Genoa – 1984–85
- Moreno Rutten – Crotone – 2019–20
- Mohamed Sankoh – Cosenza – 2024–25
- Kevin Strootman – Genoa – 2022–23
- Elayis Tavşan – Cesena, Reggiana – 2024–26
- Jean-Paul van Gastel – Ternana – 2001–02
- Sydney van Hooijdonk – Cesena – 2024–25
- Luciano van Kallen – Genoa – 1998–99
- Leonard van Utrecht – Padova – 1996–97
- John van 't Schip – Genoa – 1995–96
- Tijs Velthuis – Salernitana – 2024–25
- Karel Woogt – Messina – 1950–51
- Jeroen Zoet – Spezia – 2023–24

== New Zealand ==
- Liam Graham – Ascoli – 2012–13
- Niko Kirwan – Reggiana – 2020–21

== Nigeria ==
- Daniel Adejo – Reggina, Vicenza – 2009–14, 2015–17
- Saidu Adeshina – Ternana, Arezzo – 2000–06
- Akande Ajide – Venezia – 2004–05
- Franklyn Akammadu – Cesena – 2016–17
- Ebenezer Akinsanmiro – Sampdoria – 2024–25
- Mohammed Aliyu Datti – Padova, Monza, Siena – 1997–98, 2000–01, 2002–03
- David Ankeye – Entella – 2025–26
- Theophilus Awua – Spezia, Livorno, Cittadella, Crotone – 2017–18, 2019–22
- Ibrahim Babatunde – Piacenza – 2003–04
- Raphael Chukwu – Bari – 2001–03
- Osarimen Ebagua – Varese, Torino, Spezia, Bari, Como, Vicenza, Pro Vercelli – 2010–17
- Tyronne Ebuehi – Empoli – 2025–26
- Isah Eliakwu – Ascoli, Triestina, Spezia, Gallipoli – 2004–10
- Hugo Enyinnaya – Bari, Livorno – 2001–04
- Hashimu Garba – Chievo, Pistoiese – 1999–2000, 2001–02
- Cyril Gona – Ternana – 2004–06
- Ezekiel Henty – Spezia – 2013–14
- Kelechi Francis Ibekwe – Venezia – 2003–04
- Lucky Isibor – Reggiana – 1998–99
- Stephen Makinwa – Como, Genoa – 2003–05
- Jerry Mbakogu – Padova, Juve Stabia, Carpi, Cosenza – 2010–15, 2016–19, 2020–21
- Kingsley Michael – Perugia, Cremonese, Reggina – 2018–21
- Abdullahi Nura – Perugia – 2017–18
- Precious Monye Onyabor – Cosenza – 1996–97
- Joel Obi – Chievo, Reggina – 2019–21, 2022–23
- Victor Nsofor Obinna – Chievo – 2007–08
- Nwankwo Obiora – Gubbio, Padova – 2011–13
- Christian Obodo – Torino – 2010–11
- Kenneth Obodo – Grosseto – 2012–13
- Nnamdi Oduamadi – Torino, Varese, Brescia, Crotone, Latina – 2011–15
- **David Okereke** – Spezia, Cremonese, **Benevento** – 2015–19, 2023–24, 2026–
- Orji Okwonkwo – Brescia, Reggina, Cittadella, Reggiana, Pescara – 2017–18, 2020–22, 2023–26
- Daniel Ola – Cesena – 2006–08
- Mathew Olorunleke – Catanzaro – 2005–06
- John Olufemi – Palermo, Venezia – 2002–03, 2004–05
- Akeem Omolade – Treviso – 2000–01
- Benjamin Onwuachi – Salernitana – 2004–05
- Wilfred Osuji – Varese, Padova, Modena – 2010–16
- Umar Sadiq – Perugia – 2018–19
- Jero Shakpoke – Reggiana – 1998–99
- Nwankwo Simy – Crotone, Parma, Benevento, Salernitana – 2018–20, 2021–23, 2024–25
- Adewale Dauda Wahab – Ternana – 2004–05
- Emeka Jude Ugali – Monza – 2000–01
- Kingsley Umunegbu – Salernitana – 2008–09
- Kenneth Zeigbo – Venezia – 2002–03

== North Korea ==
- Han Kwang-song – Perugia – 2017–19

== North Macedonia ==
- Nikola Jakimovski – Varese, Como, Bari, Benevento, Trapani – 2014–17, 2019–20
- Mensur Kurtisi – Varese – 2014–15
- Ilija Nestorovski – Palermo, Ascoli – 2017–19, 2023–24
- Boban Nikolov – Lecce – 2020–21
- Goran Pandev – Parma – 2021–22
- Filip Pivkovski – Novara – 2013–14
- Stefan Ristovski – Crotone, Bari, Latina – 2011–15
- Dejan Stojanović – Bologna, Crotone – 2014–15
- Aleksandar Trajkovski – Palermo – 2017–19
- Leonard Zuta – Lecce – 2020–21

== Northern Ireland ==
- Kyle Lafferty – Palermo, Reggina – 2013–14, 2020–21

== Norway ==
- Kristoffer Askildsen – Sampdoria – 2023–24
- Haitam Aleesami – Palermo – 2017–19
- Knut Andersen – Padova – 1952–53
- Runar Berg – Venezia – 2000–01
- **Emil Bohinen** – Frosinone, Venezia, **Cesena** – 2024–
- Per Bredesen – Udinese, Messina – 1955–56, 1959–61
- Finn Gundersen – Verona – 1958–59
- **Dennis Johnsen** – Venezia, Cremonese, **Palermo** – 2020–21, 2022–
- Julian Kristoffersen – Salernitana, Cosenza – 2020–22
- **Tobias Lauritsen** – **Sampdoria** – 2026–
- Steinar Nilsen – Napoli – 1998–2000
- **Martin Palumbo** – **Avellino** – 2025–
- Markus Solbakken – Pisa – 2024–25
- Stefan Strandberg – Trapani – 2019–20
- **Morten Thorsby** – **Cremonese** – 2026–
- Kristian Thorstvedt – Sassuolo – 2024–25

== Panama ==
- Luiz Cesar Fraiz – Frosinone – 2014–15
- Eric Herrera – Avellino – 2013–14

== Paraguay ==
- Rodrigo Alborno – Novara, Cittadella – 2012–14
- Óscar Ayala – Bari – 2001–03
- Édgar Barreto – Atalanta, Palermo – 2010–11, 2013–14
- José Colman – Cittadella – 2008–09
- Paulo da Silva – Venezia, Cosenza – 2000–02
- Julio Valentín González – Vicenza – 2004–06
- Rivaldo González – Venezia, Bari – 2003–05, 2011–13
- Marin José Guimaraens – Venezia – 2004–05
- Tomas Guzman – Ternana, Messina, Crotone, Juventus, Spezia, Piacenza, Gubbio – 2002–12
- Ronald Huth – Vicenza – 2009–10
- Dante López – Crotone – 2006–07
- Richard Lugo – Bari – 2013–14
- Rubén Maldonado – Venezia, Cosenza, Napoli, Chievo – 2000–05, 2006–08
- Victor Hugo Mareco – Brescia, Verona – 2005–10, 2011–12
- David Meza – Cesena – 2012–13
- José Montiel – Reggina – 2009–12
- Gustavo Neffa – Cremonese – 1990–91
- Luis Fernando Páez – Gallipoli – 2009–10
- Nelinho – Catanzaro – 2005–06
- Federico Santander – Reggina – 2022–23
- Claudio Vargas – Treviso – 2006–07
- Cesar Verdun – Verona – 2012–13

== Peru ==
- Álvaro Ampuero – Padova – 2013–14
- Joazhiño Arroe – Siena – 2010–11
- **Gianluca Lapadula** – Cesena, Pescara, Benevento, Cagliari, **Spezia** – 2012–13, 2015–16, 2021–23, 2024–
- Roberto Merino – Salernitana, Nocerina – 2008–10, 2011–12
- Julio Uribe – Cagliari – 1983–85
- Gustavo Vassallo – Palermo – 2001–02

== Poland ==
- Błażej Augustyn – Rimini, Vicenza, Ascoli – 2008–09, 2011–12, 2016–17
- **Dawid Bembnista** – **Empoli** – 2026–
- Adrian Benedyczak – Parma – 2021–24
- Bartosz Bereszyński – Sampdoria, Palermo – 2023–26
- Paweł Bochniewicz – Reggina – 2013–14
- Michał Chrapek – Catania – 2014–15
- Adam Chrzanowski – Pordenone – 2020–22
- Thiago Rangel Cionek – Padova, Modena, Palermo, Reggina – 2012–16, 2017–18, 2020–23
- **Paweł Dawidowicz** – Palermo, **Verona** – 2017–19, 2026–
- Bartłomiej Drągowski – Spezia – 2023–24
- Patryk Dziczek – Salernitana – 2019–21
- Kamil Glik – Torino, Benevento – 2011–12, 2021–23
- **Tommaso Guercio** – **Carrarese** – 2026–
- Filip Jagiełło – Brescia, Genoa, Spezia – 2020–24
- Ryszard Janecki – Legnano – 1946–47
- Paweł Jaroszyński – Salernitana, Pescara – 2019–21, 2024–25
- Iwo Kaczmarski – Empoli – 2025–26
- Adam Kokoszka – Empoli – 2008–11
- Marek Koźmiński – Udinese, Brescia, Ancona – 1994–95, 1998–2000, 2001–02
- Kamil Król – Brescia – 2006–07
- Krzysztof Kubica – Benevento – 2022–23
- Tomasz Kupisz – Cittadella, Brescia, Novara, Cesena, Ascoli, Livorno, Trapani, Salernitana, Pordenone, Reggina – 2014–22
- Jakub Łabojko – Brescia, Ternana – 2020–24
- Igor Łasicki – Carpi – 2016–17
- Mateusz Lewandowski – Entella – 2014–15
- Marcin Listkowski – Lecce, Brescia, Lecco – 2020–24
- Radosław Murawski – Palermo – 2017–19
- Sebastian Musiolik – Pordenone – 2020–21
- Piotr Parzyszek – Frosinone – 2020–21
- **Patryk Peda** – SPAL, **Palermo**, Juve Stabia – 2021–23, 2024–
- Filip Piszczek – Trapani – 2019–20
- Mateusz Praszelik – Cosenza, Südtirol – 2022–25
- Arkadiusz Reca – Spezia – 2023–25
- Bartosz Salamon – Brescia, Pescara, Cagliari, SPAL, Carrarese – 2007–10, 2011–13, 2014–16, 2020–21, 2025–26
- **Kacper Sezonienko** – **Verona** – 2026–
- Paweł Sobczak – Genoa – 2000–01
- Mariusz Stępiński – Chievo, Lecce – 2019–21
- Przemysław Szymiński – Palermo, Frosinone, Reggiana – 2017–25
- Łukasz Teodorczyk – Vicenza – 2021–22
- Franiel Wincenty – Legnano – 1946–47
- Przemysław Wiśniewski – Venezia, Spezia – 2022–26
- Szymon Włodarczyk – Salernitana – 2024–25
- Rafał Wolski – Bari – 2014–15
- Władysław Żmuda – Cremonese – 1985–87
- Jan Żuberek – Ternana – 2023–24
- Szymon Żurkowski – Empoli, Spezia – 2019–21, 2023–24, 2025–26

== Portugal ==
- Aladje – Pro Vercelli – 2014–15
- Alex – Salernitana, Pro Vercelli – 2017–18
- Vitorino Antunes – Livorno – 2010–11
- Gonçalo Brandão – Siena, Cesena – 2010–11, 2012–13
- Aníbal Capela – Carpi, Cosenza – 2017–20
- Félix Correia – Parma – 2021–22
- Pedro Correia – Crotone – 2010–13
- Paulo Costa – Venezia – 2002–03
- De Oliveira – Modena – 2008–09
- Ricardo Esteves – Vicenza – 2005–06
- **Gonçalo Esteves** – **Catanzaro** – 2025–
- **Tomás Esteves** – **Pisa**, Bari – 2022–24, 2025–
- Vasco Faísca – Vicenza, Padova, Ascoli – 2001–04, 2009–13
- Bruno Fernandes – Novara – 2012–13
- **Saná Fernandes** – **Juve Stabia** – 2026–
- Pedro Costa Ferreira – Entella – 2014–17
- José Gonçalves – Venezia – 2004–05
- Tiago Gonçalves – Mantova – 2025–26
- Hugo – Sampdoria – 1999–2000
- João Moutinho – Spezia – 2023–24
- João Silva (1990) – Bari, Avellino, Salernitana – 2013–14, 2015–18
- João Silva (1998) – Trapani – 2019–20
- José Mamede – Reggina, Messina – 2001–02, 2003–04
- Manú – Modena – 2004–05
- Ricardo Matos – Ascoli – 2019–21
- Pedro Mendes – Ascoli, Modena – 2022–27
- Dany Mota – Entella, Monza – 2015–18, 2020–22, 2025–26
- Fábio Nunes – Latina – 2013–14
- Pedro Pereira – Monza – 2021–22
- Nuno Pina – Chievo – 2019–20
- Filipe Oliveira – Torino – 2010–11
- Alexandre Pimenta – Venezia – 2018–19
- Diogo Pinto – Ascoli – 2019–20
- Mário Rui – Gubbio, Spezia, Empoli – 2011–14
- Diogo Tavares – Genoa, Frosinone – 2006–07, 2008–11
- Muhamed Varela Djamanca – Reggiana, Arezzo – 2023–24, 2026–27
- Miguel Veloso – Pisa – 2023–24
- José Luís Vidigal – Napoli – 2001–04

== Puerto Rico ==
- Cristian Arrieta – Lecce – 2006–07

== Qatar ==
- Fábio César Montezine – Napoli – 2001–04

== Romania ==
- Mihai Baicu – Cittadella – 2000–02
- Mihai Bălașa – Crotone, Trapani – 2014–17
- Vladislav Blănuță – Pescara – 2020–21
- Romario Benzar – Perugia – 2019–20
- Deian Boldor – Pescara, Lanciano, Verona, Foggia – 2014–17, 2018–19
- Daniel Boloca – Frosinone, Sassuolo – 2020–23, 2024–25
- Gabriele Boloca – Ternana – 2023–24
- Laurențiu Brănescu – Juve Stabia – 2013–14
- **Rareș Burnete** – Juve Stabia, **Südtirol** – 2025–
- Sergiu Buș – Salernitana – 2015–16
- Paul Codrea – Genoa, Palermo, Torino, Siena – 2001–05, 2010–11
- Adrian Cuciula – Piacenza – 2007–08
- Cristian Daminuţă – Modena – 2009–10
- **Antonio David** – **Cesena** – 2026–
- Denis Drăguș – Genoa – 2022–23
- Radu Drăgușin – Genoa – 2022–23
- Vlad Dragomir – Perugia, Entella – 2018–21
- Iosif Fabian – Bari – 1950–51
- Dorin Goian – Spezia – 2012–13
- Gheorghe Hagi – Brescia – 1993–94
- Denis Hergheligiu – Feralpisalò – 2023–24
- Norberto Höfling – Pro Patria – 1953–54
- **Rareș Ilie** – Catanzaro, Empoli, **Mantova** – 2024–
- Dennis Man – Parma – 2021–24
- Andrei Mărginean – Ternana – 2023–24
- Marius Marin – Pisa – 2019–25
- Cristian Melinte – Piacenza – 2009–10
- Claudiu Micovschi – Reggina – 2020–21
- Emil Micossi – Catania – 1934–37
- Valentin Mihăilă – Parma – 2021–24
- Adrian Mihalcea – Genoa, Verona – 2001–04
- Bogdan Mitrea – Ascoli – 2015–16
- Alexandru Mitriță – Pescara – 2015–16
- Vasile Mogos – Ascoli, Cremonese, Chievo, Crotone – 2016–22
- Horațiu Moldovan – Sassuolo – 2024–25
- Olimpiu Moruțan – Pisa – 2022–23, 2024–25
- Valentin Năstase – Genoa, Palermo, Bologna – 2002–04, 2005–06
- Viorel Năstase – Catanzaro – 1984–85
- Ionuț Nedelcearu – Crotone, Palermo – 2021–25
- Constantin Nica – Avellino, Latina – 2015–17
- Claudiu Niculescu – Genoa – 2002–03
- Mihael Onișa – Pordenone – 2021–22
- Daniel Pancu – Cesena – 1999–2000
- Sorin Paraschiv – Rimini – 2007–09
- Bogdan Pătraşcu – Piacenza, Padova – 2001–08, 2009–10
- Victor Pepoli – Palermo – 1936–37
- Alexandru Pena – Bari – 2012–14
- Adrian Petre – Cosenza – 2020–21
- Ovidiu Petre – Modena – 2011–12
- Adrian Piţ – Pisa, Triestina – 2008–10
- Dennis Politic – Cremonese – 2021–22
- Ștefan Popescu – Ternana, Modena, Salernitana – 2014–16, 2017–18
- Daniel Prodan – Messina – 2001–02
- George Pușcaș – Bari, Benevento, Novara, Palermo, Pisa, Genoa – 2015–19, 2021–24
- Ionuț Rada – Bari – 2014–16
- Ionuț Radu – Avellino – 2017–18
- Florin Răducioiu – Brescia – 1998–2000
- Adrian Rus – Pisa – 2022–23, 2024–25
- Ioan Sabău – Brescia – 1993–94, 1995–96
- Marius Sava – Genoa – 2001–02
- Andres Șfaiț – Salernitana – 2024–25
- Nicolae Simatoc – Brescia – 1949–50
- Adrian Stoian – Pescara, Bari, Crotone, Livorno, Ascoli – 2010–12, 2014–16, 2018–21
- Sergiu Suciu – Torino, Juve Stabia, Crotone, Venezia – 2011–15, 2017–20
- Alin Toșca – Benevento – 2022–23

== Russia ==
- Viktor Budyanskiy – Avellino, Lecce – 2005–06, 2007–08
- Denis Cheryshev – Venezia – 2022–24
- Igor Kolyvanov – Foggia – 1995–96
- Ruslan Nigmatullin – Salernitana – 2002–03
- Igor Shalimov – Napoli – 1998–99
- Igor Simutenkov – Reggiana – 1995–96, 1997–98
- Andrei Talalayev – Treviso – 1997–98

== San Marino ==
- Elia Benedettini – Novara – 2016–18
- Massimo Bonini – Cesena, Bologna – 1979–81, 1991–93
- Roberto Cevoli – Reggiana, Torino, Cesena, Modena, Crotone – 1995–2000, 2001–02, 2004–05
- Roberto Di Maio – Nocerina – 2011–12
- Marco Macina – Arezzo, Parma – 1982–85
- Dante Maiani – Arezzo, Como, Avellino – 1966–67, 1972–74
- Andy Selva – Sassuolo – 2008–09

== Scotland ==
- Luis Binks – Como – 2022–23
- Josh Doig – Sassuolo – 2024–25
- **Liam Henderson** – Bari, Verona, Empoli, Lecce, Palermo, **Sampdoria** – 2017–21, 2023–24, 2025–
- Joe Jordan – Milan – 1982–83
- Harvey St Clair – Venezia – 2018–19, 2020–21, 2022–23

== Senegal ==
- Khouma Babacar – Padova, Modena – 2012–14
- Keita Baldé – Monza – 2025–26
- Joel Baraye – Brescia, Entella, Salernitana – 2013–14, 2015–18, 2020–21
- Yves Baraye – Juve Stabia, Parma, Padova – 2013–14, 2017–19
- Moustapha Beye – Novara – 2013–14, 2016–18
- Issa Cissokho – Bari – 2015–16
- Ferdinand Coly – Perugia – 2004–05
- Keba Coly – Ascoli – 2018–19
- Mohamed Coly – Cittadella, Pro Vercelli – 2012–16
- Racine Coly – Brescia – 2013–18
- Mamadou Coulibaly – Pescara, Carpi, Entella, Trapani, Salernitana, Ternana, Palermo, Catanzaro, Südtirol – 2017–21, 2022–26
- Pape Dia – Avellino – 2013–14
- Layousse Diallo – Avellino – 2016–17
- Djibril Diawara – Torino, Cosenza – 2000–02
- Matar Dieye – Vicenza – 2015–16
- Abou Diop – Juve Stabia, Crotone, Ternana – 2013–15
- N'Diaye Djiby – Juve Stabia – 2013–14
- Diaw Doudou – Ancona, Bari, Torino, Cesena, Avellino – 2000–09
- Ricardo Faty – Reggina – 2020–22
- Alfred Gomis – Crotone, Avellino, Cesena, Salernitana, Como, Palermo – 2013–17, 2022–23, 2024–26
- Lys Gomis – Torino, Ascoli, Trapani – 2011–13, 2014–15
- Diomansy Kamara – Modena – 2001–02
- Franck Kanouté – Pescara, Ascoli, Cosenza – 2017–20
- Mamadou Kanouté – Pro Vercelli – 2017–18
- Youssou Lo – Vicenza – 2012–13
- Ibrahima Mbaye – Bologna – 2014–15
- Maodo Malick Mbaye – Carpi, Latina, Cremonese – 2014–19
- Alain Mendy – Mantova – 2008–09
- Roger Mendy – Pescara – 1993–94
- Moussa Ndiaye – Cesena – 2017–18
- M'Baye Niang – Sampdoria – 2024–25
- Mohamed Sarr – Atalanta – 2003–04
- Fallou Sarr – Ascoli, Cremonese, Spezia – 2020–22, 2023–26
- Assan Seck – Pisa – 2021–22
- Baba Ndaw Seck – Brescia – 2013–14
- Demba Seck – SPAL, Catanzaro – 2020–22, 2024–25
- Moustapha Seck – Carpi, Empoli, Novara, Livorno – 2016–18, 2019–20
- Fallou Sene – Frosinone – 2024–25
- Ousmane Senè Pape – Salernitana – 2000–01
- Youssouph Cheikh Sylla – Pordenone – 2021–22
- Demba Thiam – SPAL, Juve Stabia, Monza – 2020–23, 2024–26
- Mame Baba Thiam – Virtus Lanciano – 2013–15
- Pape Samba Thiam – Benevento – 2022–23
- Mamadou Tounkara – Crotone, Salernitana, Cittadella – 2015–16, 2021–23
- Ibrahima Papa Wade – Cesena – 2025–26
- Papa Waigo – Verona, Cesena, Grosseto, Ascoli – 2002–07, 2010–12

== Serbia ==
- Vlada Avramov – Vicenza, Pescara, Treviso – 2001–07
- Miloš Bočić – Pescara, Frosinone – 2019–21, 2022–23
- Dražen Bolić – Salernitana, Ancona, Vicenza – 1999–2003, 2004–05
- Uroš Ćosić – Pescara, Frosinone – 2013–15
- Mladen Devetak – Palermo – 2022–23
- Miloš Dobrijević – Salernitana – 2002–03
- Filip Đorđević – Chievo – 2019–21
- Ljubiša Dunđerski – Atalanta, Como, Treviso – 1998–99, 2001–02, 2003–04
- Predrag Gajić – Fidelis Andria – 1997–98
- Vladimir Golemić – Crotone – 2018–20, 2021–22
- Petar Golubović – Novara, Pisa – 2013–14, 2016–18
- Nikola Gulan – Empoli, Modena – 2009–10, 2012–13
- **Mihajlo Ilić** – **Cesena** – 2026–
- Filip Janković – Catania – 2014–15
- Zoran Jovičić – Sampdoria – 1999–2002
- Aleksandar Kocić – Perugia – 1997–98
- Nenad Krstičić – Sampdoria, Bologna – 2011–12, 2014–15
- Ivan Lakićević – Venezia, Reggina – 2019–22
- Nikola Lazetić – Genoa, Torino – 2004–06
- Bratislav Mijalković – Perugia – 1997–98
- Milan Milanović – Vicenza, Palermo, Ascoli, Pisa – 2012–14, 2015–17
- David Milinković – Ternana, Salernitana, Lanciano – 2014–16
- Vanja Milinković-Savić – Ascoli – 2018–19
- Nikola Ninković – Empoli, Ascoli – 2017–20
- Marko Perović – Cremonese, Ancona, Napoli – 1996–97, 2002–04
- Lazar Petković – Carpi – 2016–17
- Petar Puača – Cremonese – 1998–99
- Uroš Radaković – Novara – 2013–14
- Ivan Radovanović – Pisa, Atalanta – 2008–09, 2010–11
- Boris Radunović – Avellino, Salernitana, Cremonese, Cagliari, Bari, Spezia – 2016–19, 2022–23, 2024–26
- Slobodan Rajković – Palermo, Perugia – 2017–20
- Nenad Sakić – Sampdoria – 1999–2003
- Vlado Šmit – Atalanta, Pescara, Bologna, Treviso, Gallipoli – 2003–10
- Filip Stanković – Sampdoria, Venezia – 2023–24, 2025–26
- Alen Stevanović – Torino, Palermo, Bari – 2010–12, 2013–15
- Aleksa Terzić – Empoli – 2020–21
- Nenad Tomović – SPAL – 2020–21
- Aleksandar Trifunović – Ascoli – 1984–86
- **Aljoša Vasić** – Palermo, **Südtirol** – 2023–
- **Vanja Vlahović** – Spezia, **Mantova** – 2025–
- Miloš Vulić – Crotone, Perugia – 2021–23
- Petar Zivkov – Vicenza – 2016–17
- Bratislav Živković – Sampdoria – 1999–2003

== Sierra Leone ==
- Kewullay Conteh – Chievo, Venezia, Palermo, Albinoleffe, Grosseto, Piacenza – 1997–2001, 2002–04, 2007–11
- Mohamed Kallon – Genoa – 1997–98
- Yayah Kallon – Bari, Salernitana – 2023–25
- Augustus Kargbo – Crotone, Reggiana, Cesena – 2018–19, 2020–22, 2024–25
- Jonathan Morsay – Chievo – 2019–21
- Rodney Strasser – Reggina, Livorno – 2013–15

== Slovakia ==
- Jozsef Anthos – Carrarese – 1947–48
- Pavol Bajza – Crotone – 2014–15
- Marek Čech – Como – 2015–16
- Dávid Ďuriš – Ascoli – 2023–24
- Pavol Farkaš – Ternana – 2013–14
- Miloš Glonek – Ancona – 1993–94
- Adam Griger – Cagliari – 2022–23
- Norbert Gyömbér – Catania, Bari, Perugia, Salernitana – 2014–15, 2017–21
- Dávid Ivan – Bari – 2016–17
- Marek Hamšík – Brescia – 2005–07
- Kamil Kopúnek – Bari – 2011–12
- Július Korostelev – Parma – 1954–56
- Tomáš Košický – Novara – 2012–14
- Richard Lásik – Brescia, Avellino – 2012–14, 2016–18
- Josef Margarita – Cesena – 1946–47
- Róbert Mazáň – Venezia – 2018–19
- Samuel Mraz – Crotone – 2018–19
- Adam Obert – Cagliari – 2022–23
- Martin Petráš – Lecce, Treviso, Triestina, Cesena, Grosseto – 2006–12
- Nikolas Špalek – Brescia – 2017–19, 2020–22
- Dávid Strelec – Reggina – 2022–23
- **Tomáš Suslov** – **Verona** – 2026–
- Ľubomír Tupta – Verona, Ascoli – 2018–19, 2020–21
- Martin Valjent – Ternana – 2013–18
- Tomáš Vestenický – Modena – 2015–16
- Blažej Vašcák – Treviso, Lecce, Cesena – 2006–08

== Slovenia ==
- Siniša Anđelković – Ascoli, Modena, Palermo, Venezia, Padova – 2011–14, 2017–19
- Armin Bačinović – Verona, Palermo, Virtus Lanciano, Ternana – 2012–17
- Gregor Bajde – Novara – 2016–17
- Jure Balkovec – Bari, Verona, Empoli – 2017–20
- Maks Barišič – Catania – 2014–15
- Damir Bartulovič – Vicenza – 2014–15
- **Tjaš Begić** – Parma, Frosinone, **Sampdoria** – 2023–
- Vid Belec – Crotone, Carpi, Salernitana – 2010–12, 2016–17, 2020–21
- Žan Benedičič – Como, Ascoli – 2015–16
- Sebastian Berko – Triestina – 2002–03
- Matija Boben – Livorno, Ternana – 2018–20, 2021–22
- Žan Celar – Cittadella, Cremonese – 2019–21
- Boštjan Cesar – Chievo – 2019–20
- Sebastjan Cimirotič – Lecce – 2002–03
- Tio Cipot – Spezia – 2023–24
- Domen Črnigoj – Venezia, Reggiana, Südtirol – 2020–21, 2022–24, 2025–26
- Zlatko Dedič – Empoli, Cremonese, Frosinone, Piacenza – 2004–05, 2006–09
- Robert Englaro – Foggia, Atalanta – 1996–97, 1998–1999
- Matjaž Florjančič – Cremonese, Torino, Fidelis Andria, Alzano Virescit, Crotone – 1992–93, 1996–97, 1998–2001
- Jasmin Handanovič – Mantova, Empoli – 2007–11
- Samir Handanovič – Rimini – 2006–07
- Enej Jelenič – Padova, Livorno, Carpi – 2011–19
- Žan Jevšenak – Pisa – 2024–25
- Jan Koprivec – Gallipoli, Perugia – 2009–10, 2014–15
- Luka Krajnc – Cesena, Cagliari, Frosinone, Catanzaro – 2013–14, 2015–18, 2019–20, 2023–25
- Kristian Kraus – Gubbio – 2011–12
- Jasmin Kurtić – Varese, Südtirol – 2011–12, 2023–25
- Dejan Lazarević – Torino, Padova, Modena – 2010–13
- Anej Lovrečič – Lecce – 2007–08
- Žan Majer – Lecce, Reggina, Cremonese, Mantova – 2018–19, 2020–26
- Danijel Marčeta – Virtus Lanciano – 2012–13
- **Florijan Mežnar** – **Empoli** – 2026–
- Jan Mlakar – Venezia, Pisa – 2017–18, 2023–25
- Daniel Pavlev – Chievo – 2020–21
- Nik Prelec – Cagliari – 2022–23
- Amir Ružnić – Pescara – 1997–99
- Petar Stojanović – Sampdoria, Salernitana – 2023–25
- Rok Štraus – Ternana – 2005–06
- Aljaž Struna – Varese, Palermo, Carpi, Perugia – 2012–15, 2016–19, 2022–23
- Leo Štulac – Venezia, Empoli, Palermo, Reggiana – 2017–18, 2019–21, 2022–26
- Aljaž Tavčar – Ascoli – 2022–23
- **Luka Topalović** – **Carrarese** – 2026–
- Martin Turk – Parma – 2021–22
- Dejan Vokić – Benevento, Pescara, Pordenone – 2018–23
- Miha Zajc – Empoli – 2017–18
- Žan Žužek – Bari – 2022–24

== Somalia ==
- Ayub Daud – Crotone – 2009–10
- Abel Gigli – Crotone – 2014–15

== South Africa ==
- Quinton Fortune – Brescia – 2008–09
- Phil Masinga – Salernitana – 1996–97
- Siyabonga Nomvethe – Salernitana, Empoli – 2003–05
- Joel Untersee – Brescia, Empoli – 2016–18

== South Korea ==
- Lee Seung-woo – Verona – 2018–19

== Spain ==
- Raúl Asencio – Avellino, Benevento, Pisa, Cosenza, Pescara, SPAL, Lecce, Cittadella – 2017–23
- Jonathan Aspas – Piacenza – 2007–09
- Adrián Bernabé – Parma – 2021–24
- Álex Blanco – Como, Reggiana – 2021–24
- Jalen Blesa – Cesena – 2025–26
- Antonio Casas – Venezia – 2025–26
- José Ángel Crespo – Padova, Verona – 2010–11, 2012–13
- Miguel de las Cuevas – Spezia – 2014–16
- Javier de Pedro – Perugia – 2004–05
- Siren Diao – Cesena – 2025–26
- Jon Errasti – Spezia – 2015–17
- Cesc Fàbregas – Como – 2022–23
- Lamine Fanne – Pescara – 2025–26
- Paolo Fernandes – Perugia – 2019–20
- Salva Ferrer – Spezia – 2019–20, 2024–25
- Pol García – Vicenza, Como, Crotone, Latina, Cremonese – 2014–18
- Alexandre Geijo – Brescia, Venezia – 2015–16, 2017–19
- **Bernat Guiu** – **Entella** – 2025–
- Luis Helguera – Fiorentina, Vicenza – 2003–04, 2005–08
- Rafa Jordà – Siena – 2013–14
- Juande – Spezia – 2014–16, 2017–18
- Keko – Grosseto – 2011–12
- Antonio Luna – Spezia – 2014–15
- Esteban López – Napoli – 2001–02
- Pedro López – Arezzo, Genoa – 2005–07
- Josep Martínez – Genoa – 2022–23
- Miguel Ángel Maza – Reggina – 2013–14
- Raúl Moro – Ternana – 2022–23
- Víctor Narro – Sampdoria – 2025–26
- Andrea Orlandi – Novara – 2016–18
- José Ortiz – Ravenna – 1999–2000
- Héctor Otín – Entella – 2015–16
- Rafael Páez – Bologna – 2014–15
- Estanis Pedrola – Sampdoria – 2023–26
- Kike Pérez – Venezia – 2025–26
- Sergio Postigo – Spezia – 2015–16
- Rubén Ramos – Brescia – 2011–12
- Alejandro Rodríguez – Cesena, Salernitana, Empoli, Brescia, Chievo, Entella – 2012–14, 2016–21
- Pablo Rodríguez – Lecce, Brescia, Ascoli – 2020–24
- **Gerard Yepes** – Sampdoria, **Empoli** – 2023–

== Suriname ==
- Djavan Anderson – Bari, Salernitana, Cosenza – 2017–19, 2021–22
- Ridgeciano Haps – Venezia, Genoa – 2022–23, 2025–26

== Sweden ==
- Viktor Agardius – Livorno – 2019–20
- Peter Amoran – Cesena – 2025–26
- Kurt Andersson – Udinese – 1962–64
- Sune Andersson – Roma – 1951–52
- Samuel Armenteros – Benevento, Crotone – 2018–20
- Martin Åslund – Salernitana – 2004–05
- Jonas Axeldal – Foggia – 1996–98
- John Björkengren – Lecce, Brescia – 2020–23
- Arvid Brorsson – Monza – 2025–26
- Karl Corneliusson – Salernitana – 2003–04
- Ivar Eidefjäll – Legnano, Novara – 1950–51, 1952–53, 1956–57
- Albin Ekdal – Spezia – 2023–24
- Emmanuel Ekong – Perugia – 2022–23
- Erik Friberg – Bologna – 2014–15
- Riccardo Gagliolo – Carpi, Parma, Reggina, Ascoli – 2013–15, 2016–18, 2021–24
- Samuel Gustafson – Perugia, Verona, Cremonese – 2017–21
- Melker Hallberg – Ascoli – 2016–17
- Linus Hallenius – Padova – 2011–12
- Klas Ingesson – Bari – 1996–97
- Svante Ingelsson – Pescara – 2019–20
- Mikael Ishak – Crotone – 2013–14
- Stefan Ishizaki – Genoa – 2003–04
- Alexander Jallow – Brescia – 2022–25
- Torbjörn Jonsson – Mantova – 1965–66
- **Nermin Karić** – Benevento, Entella, **Juve Stabia** – 2022–23, 2025–
- Valentino Lai – Palermo, Salernitana, Triestina – 2002–05
- Anders Limpar – Cremonese – 1990–91
- Oscar Linnér – Brescia – 2021–22
- Bengt Lindskog – Lecco – 1962–64
- David Löfquist – Gubbio – 2011–12
- Bror Mellberg – Genoa – 1951–52
- Marko Mitrović – Brescia – 2012–14
- Stellan Nilsson – Genoa – 1951–52
- Knut Nordahl – Roma – 1951–52
- Niklas Nyhlén – Cosenza – 1996–97
- Yksel Osmanovski – Torino – 2003–04
- Karl–Erik Palmér – Legnano – 1952–53, 1954–57
- Robert Prytz – Verona – 1990–91, 1992–93
- Johan Ragnell – Reggiana – 1997–98
- Marcus Rohdén – Crotone, Frosinone – 2018–23
- **Jonas Rouhi** – **Carrarese** – 2025–
- **Amin Sarr** – **Verona** – 2026–
- Bengt–Arne Selmosson – Udinese – 1962–64
- Hamse Shagaxle – Spezia – 2025–26
- Robin Simović – Livorno – 2019–20
- Glenn Strömberg – Atalanta – 1987–88
- Stig Sundqvist – Roma – 1951–53
- Nikola Vasić – Reggina – 2020–21

== Switzerland ==
- Samuel Ballet – Como – 2023–24
- **Leorat Bega** – **Verona** – 2026–
- Valon Behrami – Genoa, Verona, Brescia – 2003–05, 2021–22
- Gaetano Berardi – Brescia, Sampdoria – 2006–10, 2011–12
- Martino Borghese – Genoa, Bari, Pro Vercelli, Spezia, Varese, Como, Livorno – 2006–07, 2011–16
- Marin Cavar – Chievo – 2019–20
- Alessandro Ciarrocchi – Piacenza – 2007–08
- David Da Costa – Novara – 2015–17
- Fabio Daprelà – Brescia, Palermo, Bari – 2011–14, 2016–17
- Saulo Decarli – Livorno, Avellino – 2012–14
- **Daniel Denoon** – **Pisa** – 2026–
- Francesco Di Jorio – Salernitana – 1999–2001
- Antonio Esposito – Cagliari – 2000–02
- Matteo Fedele – Carpi, Bari, Foggia, Cesena – 2016–18
- Philippe Fuchs – Padova – 1952–53
- **Stefan Gartenmann** – **Sampdoria** – 2026–
- Natan Girma – Reggiana – 2023–26
- Simone Grippo – Piacenza, Frosinone – 2008–09, 2010–11
- Nicolas Haas – Palermo, Frosinone, Empoli – 2018–21
- Silvan Hefti – Genoa – 2022–23
- Xavier Hochstrasser – Padova – 2010–11
- Dennis Iapichino – Livorno – 2018–19
- Zoran Josipovic – Novara – 2013–14
- Pajtim Kasami – Sampdoria – 2023–25
- Philippe Koch – Novara – 2016–17
- **Calixte Ligue** – **Mantova** – 2025–
- Massimo Lombardo – Perugia – 1997–98
- Christopher Lungoyi – Ascoli – 2022–23
- Cephas Malele – Palermo, Virtus Entella – 2013–15
- Alessandro Martinelli – Modena, Brescia – 2014–19
- Giuseppe Mazzarelli – Bari – 2001–03
- **Kevin Mbabu** – **Sampdoria** – 2026–
- Michel Morganella – Novara, Palermo, Padova, Livorno – 2010–11, 2013–14, 2017–20
- **Nikolas Muci** – **Mantova** – 2025–
- Alain Nef – Piacenza, Triestina – 2006–08, 2009–10
- Marco Padalino – Catania, Piacenza, Sampdoria, Vicenza – 2004–08, 2011–13
- Giuseppe Perrone – Foggia, Pistoiese, Cosenza – 1997–98, 2001–03
- Lionel Pizzinat – Bari, Verona – 2001–05
- Roberto Rodríguez Araya – Novara – 2015–16
- Karim Rossi – Spezia – 2015–16
- Jonathan Rossini – Cittadella, Sassuolo, Bari – 2008–11, 2014–15
- Haris Seferovic – Novara – 2012–13
- David Sesa – Lecce, Napoli – 1998–99, 2001–04
- Rijat Shala – Salernitana, Novara – 2004–05, 2010–11
- Simon Sohm – Parma – 2021–24
- Danijel Subotić – Grosseto – 2010–11
- Kubilay Türkyılmaz – Bologna – 1991–93
- Fabrizio Zambrella – Brescia – 2005–09

== Syria ==
- George Mourad – Brescia – 2005–06

== Togo ==
- Malik Djibril – Vicenza – 2021–22
- Mohamed Kader – Vicenza – 2001–02
- **Steven Nador** – SPAL, **Modena** – 2021–22, 2025–

== Tunisia ==
- Khaled Badra – Genoa – 2001–02
- Selim Ben Djemia – Padova, Frosinone – 2009–11
- Raouf Bouzaiene – Genoa – 2001–03
- **Dhirar Brik** – **Südtirol** – 2025–
- Dylan Bronn – Salernitana – 2024–25
- Oualid El Hasni – Vicenza – 2014–15
- Chokri El Ouaer – Genoa – 2001–02
- Hassen Gabsi – Genoa – 2001–03
- Ahmed Guilouzi – Modena – 2008–09
- Karim Laribi – Sassuolo, Latina, Bologna, Cesena, Verona, Empoli, Reggiana, Reggina, Cittadella – 2011–15, 2016–22
- Alessandro Louati – Juve Stabia – 2024–25
- Imed Mhedhebi – Genoa – 2001–03
- Hamza Rafia – Cremonese – 2021–22

== Turkey ==
- Rayyan Baniya – Palermo – 2024–25
- Bülent Eken – Salernitana – 1950–51
- Emre Güral – Crotone – 2021–22
- **İsak Vural** – Frosinone, **Pisa** – 2024–25, 2026–
- Güven Yalçın – Lecce, Genoa – 2020–21, 2022–23

== Uganda ==
- Elio Capradossi – Bari, Spezia, SPAL, Cagliari, Lecco, Cittadella – 2016–20, 2021–25

== Ukraine ==
- Vyacheslav Churko – Frosinone – 2016–17
- **Bohdan Popov** – **Empoli** – 2025–
- Vasyl Pryima – Frosinone – 2016–17

== United States ==
- Gianluca Busio – Venezia – 2022–24, 2025–26
- Anthony Fontana – Ascoli – 2021–23
- Armando Frigo – Spezia – 1942–43
- Nicholas Gioacchini – Como – 2023–24
- **Jonathan Klinsmann** – **Cesena** – 2024–
- Roy Lassiter – Genoa – 1996–97
- Kristoffer Lund – Palermo – 2023–25
- Andrija Novakovich – Frosinone, Venezia, Lecco, Bari, Reggiana – 2019–26
- Danny Szetela – Brescia – 2008–09
- Tanner Tessmann – Venezia – 2022–24
- Jack de Vries – Venezia – 2022–23

== Uzbekistan ==
- Ilyos Zeytulayev – Crotone, Genoa, Vicenza, Virtus Lanciano – 2005–07, 2012–13

== Venezuela ==
- Jhon Chancellor – Brescia – 2020–22
- Alejandro Cichero – Frosinone – 2024–25
- Rolf Feltscher – Padova – 2012–13
- Massimo Margiotta – Pescara, Lecce, Reggiana, Vicenza, Piacenza, Frosinone – 1994–97, 1998–99, 2001–10
- Alessandro Milani – Avellino – 2025–26
- Edgar Moras – Sambenedettese – 1983–84
- Yordan Osorio – Parma – 2021–24
- Aristóteles Romero – Crotone – 2018–19
- Franco Signorelli – Empoli, Ternana, Spezia, Salernitana – 2011–14, 2015–18
- **Ernesto Torregrossa** – Crotone, Trapani, Brescia, Pisa, Salernitana, **Carrarese** – 2014–19, 2020–

== Wales ==
- Craig Davies – Verona – 2005–06

== See also ==
- List of foreign Serie A players
- Oriundo

== Notes ==
1. Born in Algeria
2. Born in Angola
3. Born in Angola (then Portuguese Angola)
4. Born in Argentina
5. Born in Australia
6. Born in Austria
7. Born in Belgium
8. Born in Bosnia and Herzegovina
9. Born in Bosnia and Herzegovina (then part of SFR Yugoslavia)
10. Born in Brazil
11. Born in Cameroon
12. Born in Canada
13. Born in Croatia
14. Born in Croatia (then part of SFR Yugoslavia)
15. Born in the Democratic Republic of Congo
16. Born in the Democratic Republic of Congo (then Zaïre)
17. Born in Denmark
18. Born in England
19. Born in France
20. Born in Germany
21. Born in Ghana
22. Born in Greece
23. Born in Guadeloupe (Overseas department of the French Republic)
24. Born in Guinea
25. Born in Guinea-Bissau
26. Born in Hungary
27. Born in Italy
28. Born in Ivory Coast
29. Born in Kosovo (then part of Kingdom of Serbia)
30. Born in Kosovo (then part of SFR Yugoslavia)
31. Born in Lebanon
32. Born in Luxembourg
33. Born in Martinique (Overseas department of the French Republic)
34. Born in Moldova
35. Born in Moldova (then part of the Kingdom of Romania)
36. Born in Morocco
37. Born in the Netherlands
38. Born in Nigeria
39. Born in North Macedonia (then Republic of Macedonia)
40. Born in Northern Ireland
41. Born in Norway
42. Born in Poland
43. Born in Réunion (Overseas department of the French Republic)
44. Born in Romania
45. Born in Romania (then Austria-Hungary)
46. Born in Scotland
47. Born in Senegal
48. Born in Serbia (then FR Yugoslavia)
49. Born in Sierra Leone
50. Born in Singapore
51. Born in Slovenia
52. Born in Slovenia (then part of SFR Yugoslavia)
53. Born in Spain
54. Born in Suriname
55. Born in Sweden
56. Born in Switzerland
57. Born in Turkey
58. Born in Uganda
59. Born in Ukraine (then part of the Kingdom of Romania)
60. Born in Ukraine (then part of the Soviet Union)
61. Born in the United States of America
62. Born in Uruguay
63. Born in West Germany (now part of Germany)
64. Capped for the Albania national football team
65. Capped for the Albania national under-21 football team
66. Capped for the Algeria national under-18 football team
67. Capped for the Australia national under-23 football team
68. Capped for the Austria national under-19 football team
69. Capped for the Belgium national under-21 football team
70. Capped for the Belgium national under-19 football team
71. Capped for the Belgium national under-16 football team
72. Capped for the Belgium national under-15 football team
73. Capped for the Bosnia and Herzegovina national under-19 football team
74. Capped for the Bosnia and Herzegovina national under-18 football team
75. Capped for the Bosnia and Herzegovina national under-17 football team
76. Capped for the Brittany national football team
77. Capped for the Catalonia national football team
78. Capped for the Corsica national football team
79. Capped for the Croatia national football team
80. Capped for the Croatia national under-21 football team
81. Capped for the Croatia national under-20 football team
82. Capped for the Denmark national under-21 football team
83. Capped for the Denmark national under-20 football team
84. Capped for the Denmark national under-19 football team
85. Capped for the Denmark national under-18 football team
86. Capped for the Denmark national under-17 football team
87. Capped for the Denmark national under-16 football team
88. Capped for the England national under-19 football team
89. Capped for the England national under-18 football team
90. Capped for the England national under-17 football team
91. Capped for the England national under-16 football team
92. Capped for the France national under-21 football team
93. Capped for the France national under-20 football team
94. Capped for the France national under-19 football team
95. Capped for the France national under-18 football team
96. Capped for the France national under-17 football team
97. Capped for the Germany national under-21 football team
98. Capped for the Germany national under-20 football team
99. Capped for the Germany national under-19 football team
100. Capped for the Germany national under-18 football team
101. Capped for the Germany national under-17 football team
102. Capped for the Germany national under-16 football team
103. Capped for the Italy national football B team
104. Capped for the Italy national under-23 football team
105. Capped for the Italy national under-21 football team
106. Capped for the Italy national under-20 football team
107. Capped for the Italy national under-19 football team
108. Capped for the Italy national under-18 football team
109. Capped for the Italy national under-17 football team
110. Capped for the Italy national under-16 football team
111. Capped for the Italy national under-15 football team
112. Capped for the Kosovo national football team
113. Capped for the Moldova national under-21 football team
114. Capped for the Netherlands national under-21 football team
115. Capped for the Netherlands national under-20 football team
116. Capped for the Netherlands national under-19 football team
117. Capped for the Netherlands national under-18 football team
118. Capped for the Netherlands national under-17 football team
119. Capped for the Netherlands national under-15 football team
120. Capped for the Northern Ireland national football team
121. Capped for the Padania national football team
122. Capped for the Portugal national football team
123. Capped for the Portugal national under-21 football team
124. Capped for the Portugal national under-20 football team
125. Capped for the Portugal national under-19 football team
126. Capped for the Portugal national under-18 football team
127. Capped for the Portugal national under-17 football team
128. Capped for the Scotland national under-18 football team
129. Capped for the Slovenia national under-16 football team
130. Capped for the Spain national under-21 football team
131. Capped for the Spain national under-19 football team
132. Capped for the Spain national under-18 football team
133. Capped for the Spain national under-17 football team
134. Capped for the Sweden men's national football team
135. Capped for the Sweden national under-21 football team
136. Capped for the Sweden men's national under-19 football team
137. Capped for the Sweden national under-18 football team
138. Capped for the Sweden men's national under-17 football team
139. Capped for the Sweden national under-16 football team
140. Capped for the Switzerland national under-21 football team
141. Capped for the Switzerland national under-20 football team
142. Capped for the Switzerland national under-19 football team
143. Capped for the Switzerland national under-18 football team
144. Capped for the Switzerland national under-17 football team
145. Capped for the Switzerland national under-16 football team
146. Capped for the Switzerland national under-15 football team
147. Capped for the Uruguay national under-17 football team
