= Beye (surname) =

Beye or Bèye is a Senegalese surname that may refer to

- Alioune Badara Bèye (1945–2024), Senegalese civil servant, novelist, playwright, poet, and publisher
- Ben Diogaye Bèye (born 1947), Senegalese filmwriter, filmmaker, film producer and journalist
- Habib Beye (born 1977), French-born Senegalese football player
- Lingeer Fatim Beye, a 14th-century African queen
- Mame Diarra Beye (born 1988), Senegalese politician
- Moustapha Beye (born 1995), Senegalese football player
