= Kyllan Ramé =

French footballer (born 1997)

Personal information
- Full name: Kyllan Patrick Michel Ramé
- Date of birth: 26 July 1997 (age 29)
- Place of birth: Bordeaux, France
- Height: 1.79 m (5 ft 10 in)
- Position: Midfielder

Team information
- Current team: FC APM

Youth career
- Bordeaux

Senior career*
Years	Team	Apps	(Gls)
2015–2017	Stade Bordelais	14	(0)
2017–2019	Foggia	2	(0)
2019–2020	Mérignac-Arlac	15	(2)
2020–2021	Engordany	13	(1)
2021–	FC APM		
- * Club domestic league appearances and goals as of 20:41, 4 November 2023 (UTC)

Kyllan Patrick Michel Ramé (born 26 July 1997) is a French professional footballer who plays as a midfielder.

== Early and personal life ==
Born in Bordeaux, Ramé is the son of Ulrich Ramé, who was a France international goalkeeper.

== Career ==
Ramé began his career with the youth team of Bordeaux. He then played for Stade Bordelais and Italian club Foggia. On 31 January 2019, he was released from his contract by Foggia by mutual consent. He returned to France, signing for Mérignac-Arlac in June 2019, before signing with Andorran club Engordany.

After leaving Engordany in 2021, Ramé joined French Régional 3 side FC APM, where his brother, Mathis, was also playing.
