= Mame Diarra Beye =

Senegalese politician

National Assembly (Senegal) 2 December 2024
- Incumbent
- Assumed office 2 December 2024
- President: Bassirou Diomaye Faye

Personal details
- Party: PASTEF
- Profession: Economist

Mame Diarra Beye is a Senegalese female politician born on 2 April 1988 in Thiaroye-sur-mer. She is member of the political party PASTEF (Patriotes africains du Sénégal pour le travail, l'éthique et la fraternité).

== Biography ==
Professionally, she is an economist and she was elected the deputy of the department of Pikine in legislative elections in November 2024 for the PASTEF party and has been in office since 2 December 2024.

She is part of the following committees:

- Committee on Finance and Budgetary Control
- Committee on Laws, Decentralization, Labour and Human Rights
- Committee on Economic Affairs
- Committee on Regional Planning, Urban Planning, Housing, Infrastructure and Transport

She is also a member and President of the Committee on Economic, Social and Environmental Affairs in the L’Assemblée parlementaire de la Francophonie (APF).

== 2025-Present ==
As part of the work of the Committee on Economic, Social and Environmental Affairs (CAESE) of the Parliamentary Assembly of the Francophonie (APF) in Budapest, a parliamentary economic symposium was held with the participation of Hungarian companies that she attended.
