= Amir Ružnić =

Slovenian footballer and sports agent

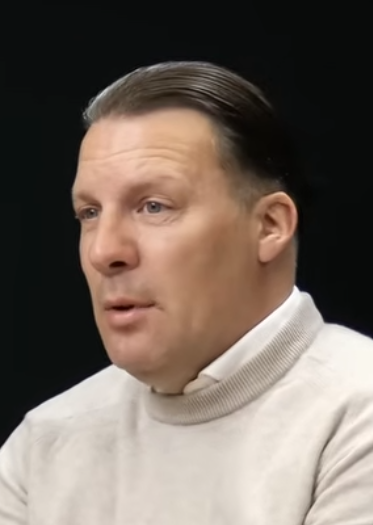

Personal information
- Full name: Amir Ružnić
- Date of birth: 30 October 1972 (age 54)
- Place of birth: SFR Yugoslavia
- Position: Midfielder

Senior career*
Years	Team	Apps	(Gls)
1991–1994	Izola	88	(2)
1995	Maribor	5	(0)
1995–1997	Primorje	61	(5)
1997–2000	Pescara	13	(0)
2000–2001	Koper	12	(0)
2001	Domžale	13	(1)
2002–2005	Izola	62	(0)

International career
1992	Slovenia	1	(0)
- * Club domestic league appearances and goals

Amir Ružnić (born 30 October 1972) is a Slovenian sports agent and former football player, who played as a midfielder and was capped once for the Slovenia national football team in a friendly match against Estonia.

== Playing career ==
During most of his playing career Ružnić played in the Slovenian PrvaLiga and has made a total of 179 league appearances for five different clubs; Izola, Maribor, Primorje, Koper, and Domžale (13).

== Football agent ==
After his career as a footballer, Ružnić became a football agent. His clients have included Josip Iličić, Jasmin Kurtić, Armin Bačinović, Dalibor Volaš, Aleksander Rajčević, Robert Berić, Aleš Mertelj, Aljaž Struna, Siniša Anđelković, Luka Krajnc, Elvis Bratanović, Anej Lovrečič, Jasmin Handanovič, Agim Ibraimi, Žan Benedičič and Anton Žlogar and Darko Milanič, among others.
