= Žan Benedičič =

Slovenian footballer (born 1995)

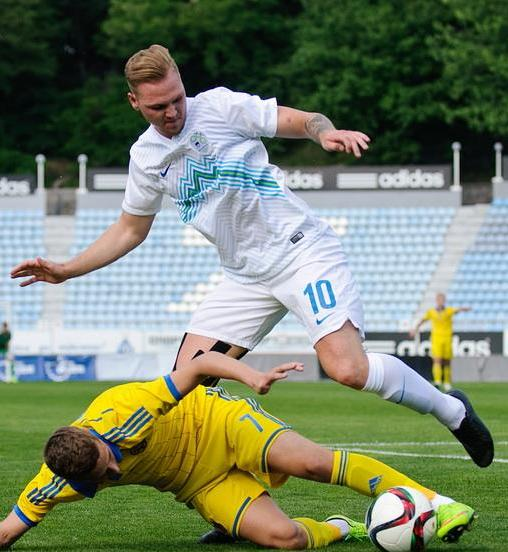
- Benedičič with the Slovenia U21 in 2015

Personal information
- Date of birth: 3 October 1995 (age 31)
- Place of birth: Kranj, Slovenia
- Height: 1.85 m (6 ft 1 in)
- Position: Attacking midfielder

Team information
- Current team: Velesovo Cerklje

Youth career
- –2009: Triglav Kranj
- 2011–2013: AC Milan

Senior career*
Years	Team	Apps	(Gls)
2013–2015	AC Milan	0	(0)
2014	→ Leeds United (loan)	1	(0)
2015–2016	Como	9	(0)
2016	Ascoli	9	(0)
2016–2017	Leyton Orient	1	(0)
2017	Olbia	8	(0)
2018–2022	Celje	81	(6)
2022–2023	Koper	29	(4)
2023–2024	Rogaška	17	(0)
2024	Kauno Žalgiris	29	(2)
2025	Triglav Kranj	26	(2)
2026	SAK Klagenfurt	15	(0)
2026–	Velesovo Cerklje	2	(0)

International career
2009–2010	Slovenia U16	3	(0)
2010	Slovenia U17	2	(1)
2013	Slovenia U18	5	(1)
2013–2016	Slovenia U21	13	(1)
- * Club domestic league appearances and goals as of 6 September 2026

Žan Benedičič (born 3 October 1995) is a Slovenian footballer who plays as an attacking midfielder for Velesovo Cerklje. He represented Slovenia at various youth levels.

== Club career ==
=== AC Milan ===
After progressing through the youth ranks at AC Milan, Benedičič broke into the Milan Primavera side. In the 2013–14 season, he made 35 appearances for the Primavera side in all competitions, and also scored 6 goals.

During the 2014–15 pre-season, he was called up to the Milan senior team for the tour of the United States by new Milan manager and his former youth coach Filippo Inzaghi, but on 29 July 2014, he flew home from the tour, strengthening speculation that he was preparing to sign on loan for Leeds United. On 30 July his agent Amir Ružnić confirmed Benedičič was close to a move to Leeds.

==== Loan to Leeds United ====
On 4 August 2014, it was confirmed that he had signed for Leeds United on a one-year loan deal, with the option for Leeds to buy at the end of the loan. Leeds head coach David Hockaday described Benedičič as "a versatile, strong and technical midfield player". He made his début for Leeds on 12 August when he came on as a substitute in the 63rd minute in a League Cup game against Accrington Stanley. Benedičič made his league début for Leeds United on 30 August in a 1–0 victory against Bolton Wanderers at Elland Road.

Shortly after making his debut, Benedičič picked up a knee injury with would rule him out for the season after he required knee surgery.

=== Return to Italy ===
After his loan spell expired at Leeds during the summer of 2015, he returned to Italy, signing for Como where he made nine appearances before signing for Ascoli, also making nine appearances.

=== Leyton Orient ===
On 19 September 2016, Benedičič joined Leyton Orient on a free transfer until January 2017. He left Orient in January after his contract was not renewed.

== International career ==
Benedičič was capped for the Slovenia national under-21 football team, making his debut on 6 September 2013 against Russia U21. He scored his first goal on 19 November 2013 when he scored a goal in Slovenia U21s' 5–1 victory against Bulgaria U21.

== Honours ==
Celje

- Slovenian PrvaLiga: 2019–20
