= Hicham Miftah =

Moroccan footballer

Personal information
- Full name: Hicham Muolaij Miftah
- Date of birth: 3 June 1980 (age 46)
- Place of birth: Casablanca, Morocco
- Position: Forward

Senior career*
| Years | Team | Apps | (Gls) |
| | Parma | 0 | (0) |
| -2000 | Crociati Noceto | | |
| 2000-2001 | Pizzichettone | | |
| 2001-2002 | Polisportiva Brescello | 26 | (6) |
| 2002-2003 | Reggiana | 25 | (4) |
| 2003 | Catania | 1 | (0) |
| 2003–2004 | Reggiana | 15 | (0) |
| 2004-2005 | Como | 24 | (3) |
| 2005-2006 | Acireale | 21 | (3) |
| 2006-2007 | Vastese | 12 | (0) |
| 2007-2011 | Crociati Noceto | 57+ | (15+) |
| 2011-2012 | Pizzighettone | | |
| 2012-2013 | Derthona | | |
| 2013-2017 | Lentigione Calcio | | |
| 2017-2018 | G.S. Felino | | |
| 2017-2018 | Correggese | | |
- * Club domestic league appearances and goals

Hicham Muolaij Miftah (born 3 June 1980 in Morocco) is a Moroccan-Italian association football coach and retired player.

== Playing career ==
Born in Morocco, Miftah moved with his family to Italy at the age of 8.

In 1999–2000, Miftah scored 17 goals for A.S. Pizzighettone in the Italian fourth division, which he claimed was the turning point of his career.

During 2003–04, Miftah played for Calcio Catania in the Italian second division, his only time playing above the third division. In 2019, he said, "At the time I was a bit bright with a strong character, I didn't accept certain behaviours, but now, years later, I admit I was wrong. In football, you have to close your mouth and pedal".

== Coaching career ==
After retiring as a player, Miftah took on a coaching career. He started as a youth coach for Pergolettese and then Reggiana, then switching into women's football as a coach for Ravenna Femminile.

Miftah successively joined Simone Banchieri's staff at Messina as a technical collaborator from January to April 2025.
