= Evans Osei =

Ghanaian footballer

Personal information
- Date of birth: 25 February 1997 (age 29)
- Place of birth: Kumasi, Ghana
- Height: 1.81 m (5 ft 11 1/2 in)
- Position: Midfielder

Team information
- Current team: F.C. Giugliano 1928

Youth career
- –2014: Ristor Lettere

Senior career*
Years	Team	Apps	(Gls)
2014–2017	Juve Stabia	5	(1)
2015	→ Bologna Primavera (loan)		
2015–2017	→ Torino Primavera (loan)		
2017	→ Pro Vercelli (loan)	2	(0)
2018–2019	Roccella	43	(0)
2019–2020	Verbania	6	(0)
2020–2021	A.S.D. Troina		
2021–	F.C. Giugliano 1928		
- * Club domestic league appearances and goals as of 22:43, 15 April 2020 (UTC)

Evans Osei (born 25 February 1997) is a Ghanaian football player who plays for Serie D club F.C. Giugliano 1928.

== Club career ==
He made his professional debut in the Lega Pro for Juve Stabia on 28 September 2014 in a game against Reggina.
