= Amadou Diambo =

Ghanaian footballer

Personal information
- Date of birth: 12 February 2001 (age 25)
- Height: 1.78 m (5 ft 10 in)
- Position: Midfielder

Team information
- Current team: United Riccione

Youth career
- –2020: Pescara

Senior career*
| Years | Team | Apps | (Gls) |
| 2020–2022 | Pescara | 24 | (1) |
| 2021 | → Benevento (loan) | 1 | (0) |
| 2022–2023 | Hebar II | | |
| 2023 | Grosseto | 14 | (1) |
| 2023 | Chieti | 7 | (0) |
| 2023– | United Riccione | 4 | (0) |
- * Club domestic league appearances and goals as of 6 January 2024

Amadou Diambo (born 12 February 2001) is a Ghanaian football player who pays as midfielder for Italian Serie D club United Riccione.

== Club career ==
He was raised in the youth system of Italian club Pescara. He made his Serie B debut for Pescara on 8 March 2020 in a game against Benevento. He substituted Andrea Marafini in the 82nd minute. He made his first start on 20 October 2020 in game against Venezia.

On 1 February 2021 he was loaned to Benevento, where he was assigned to their Under-19 squad. He made his Serie A debut for Benevento on 23 May 2021 in a game against Torino, substituting Giuseppe Di Serio in the 88th minute of a 1–1 away draw.

On summer 2021 he returned to Pescara. Ha has been released by Pescara on 15 July 2022.
