= Paweł Sobczak (footballer) =

Polish association football player

Personal information
- Full name: Paweł Piotr Sobczak
- Date of birth: 29 June 1978 (age 48)
- Place of birth: Płock, Poland
- Height: 1.89 m (6 ft 2 in)
- Position: Forward

Senior career*
Years	Team	Apps	(Gls)
–1999	Wisła Płock	33+	(5+)
1999–2000	Austria Wien	18	(1)
2001	Genoa	3	(0)
2001	RKS Radomsko	2	(0)
2002	Widzew Łódź	4	(0)
2002	Pogoń Szczecin	5	(0)
2003	Admira Wacker Mödling	10	(0)
2003	Anorthosis Famagusta	10	(3)
2004	Polonia Warsaw	12	(3)
2004–2007	Wisła Płock	33	(8)
2005–2006	→ Podbeskidzie (loan)	24	(4)
2007	Viktoria Köln		
2008	Wisła Płock	11	(1)
2008	GKS Katowice	11	(3)
2009	Lamia		
2009	Kasztelan Sierpc		
2011	Zdrój Ciechocinek		
- * Club domestic league appearances and goals

Paweł Piotr Sobczak (born 29 June 1978) is a Polish former professional footballer who played as a forward.

== Career ==
While rated as the 3rd most expensive player in Poland and attracting interest from German Bundesliga side Hertha BSC, Sobczak signed for Austria Wien, one of the most successful Austrian clubs. However, he was reported to have poor attitude, being distracted by his high salary there, and did not play as much due to change in head coach. After retirement, Sobczak said that he "was completely unprepared for such a trip [to Austria], especially mentally".

For the second half of the 2000–01 season, he signed for Genoa in the Italian second division.

In 2002, Sobczak signed for Polish club Pogoń Szczecin before joining Austrian team Admira Wacker Mödling because of Pogoń's financial issues.

In 2004, after playing in Cyprus with Anorthosis Famagusta, he signed for Wisła Płock in the Polish top flight.

In 2005, he signed for Polish second division outfit Podbeskidzie Bielsko-Biała on loan. After departing Wisła, Sobczak played in Germany and Greece as well as the Polish lower leagues.

== Honours ==
Wisła Płock

- Polish Super Cup: 2006
