= Stephan Coquin =

French footballer (born 1982)

Stephan Coquin (born 14 October 1982) is a French former footballer.

== Career ==
Coquin played for Italian second-tier side Genoa. After that, he played for Italian side Irsinese, where he was regarded as one of the club's most important players.

== Style of play ==
Coquin has been described as a "classic modern attacking midfielder with good feet and a decent physique... and has good explosiveness... has a fair propensity to score".

== Personal life ==
Coquin is a native of Courbevoie, France.
