= Moustapha Beye =

Senegalese footballer

Personal information
- Full name: Mouhamadou Moustapha Beye
- Date of birth: 6 January 1995 (age 31)
- Place of birth: Dakar, Senegal
- Height: 1.87 m (6 ft 1 1/2 in)
- Position: Centre back

Team information
- Current team: Floriana
- Number: 5

Youth career
- Alphabet City
- 2013–2014: Novara

Senior career*
Years	Team	Apps	(Gls)
2014–2018	Novara	14	(0)
2016	→ Siena (loan)	9	(0)
2018–2019	Pau	26	(0)
2019–	Floriana	2	(0)
- * Club domestic league appearances and goals as of 22:39, 4 December 2019 (UTC)

Mouhamadou Moustapha Beye (born 6 August 1995), known as Moustapha Beye, is a Senegalese professional footballer who plays for Floriana in the Maltese Premier League.

== Club career ==
He made his professional debut in the Serie B for Novara on 13 June 2014 in a game against Varese.

Since July 2018, he plays for French Championnat National side Pau FC.
