= 2021–22 Hellas Verona FC season =

Hellas Verona
2021–22 season
- President: Maurizio Setti
- Manager: Eusebio Di Francesco (until 14 September); Igor Tudor (from 14 September)
- Stadium: Stadio Marcantonio Bentegodi
- Serie A: 9th
- Coppa Italia: Second round
- Top goalscorer: League: Giovanni Simeone (17); All: Giovanni Simeone (17)
Home colours	Away colours	Third colours

The 2021–22 season was the 118th season in the existence of Hellas Verona F.C. and the club's third consecutive season in the top flight of Italian football. In addition to the domestic league, Hellas Verona participated in this season's edition of the Coppa Italia.

== Season events ==
On 7 June 2021, Eusebio Di Francesco was unveiled as the new head coach, signing a two-year contract, until 30 June 2023, replacing Ivan Jurić who left the club earlier that day to take over the vacant manager role at Torino.

== Players ==
=== First-team squad ===
As of 3 January 2022

Note: Flags indicate national team as defined under FIFA eligibility rules; some limited exceptions apply. Players may hold more than one non-FIFA nationality.

No.	Pos.	Nation	Player
1	GK	CRO	Ivor Pandur
4	MF	POR	Miguel Veloso (captain)
5	DF	ITA	Davide Faraoni (vice-captain)
7	MF	CZE	Antonín Barák
8	MF	SRB	Darko Lazović
9	FW	CRO	Nikola Kalinić
10	FW	ITA	Gianluca Caprari (on loan from Sampdoria)
11	FW	ITA	Kevin Lasagna (on loan from Udinese)
14	MF	SRB	Ivan Ilić
15	DF	TUR	Mert Çetin (on loan from Roma)
16	DF	ITA	Nicolò Casale
17	DF	ITA	Federico Ceccherini
18	FW	ITA	Matteo Cancellieri (on loan from Roma)
20	MF	SUI	Kevin Rüegg

No.	Pos.	Nation	Player
21	DF	GER	Koray Günter
22	GK	ITA	Alessandro Berardi
23	DF	ITA	Giangiacomo Magnani
24	MF	ITA	Daniel Bessa
27	DF	POL	Paweł Dawidowicz
29	DF	ITA	Fabio Depaoli (on loan from Sampdoria)
30	DF	ITA	Gianluca Frabotta (on loan from Juventus)
31	DF	CRO	Boško Šutalo (on loan from Atalanta)
32	FW	ITA	Antonino Ragusa
45	FW	GHA	Philip Yeboah
61	MF	CMR	Adrien Tameze
78	MF	CMR	Martin Hongla (on loan from Royal Antwerp)
96	GK	ITA	Lorenzo Montipò (on loan from Benevento)
99	FW	ARG	Giovanni Simeone (on loan from Cagliari)

=== Other players under contract ===
Note: Flags indicate national team as defined under FIFA eligibility rules; some limited exceptions apply. Players may hold more than one non-FIFA nationality.

No.	Pos.	Nation	Player
—	GK	ITA	Mattia Chiesa

=== On loan ===
As of 17 September 2021

Note: Flags indicate national team as defined under FIFA eligibility rules; some limited exceptions apply. Players may hold more than one non-FIFA nationality.

No.	Pos.	Nation	Player
—	GK	ITA	Nicola Borghetto (at Monterosi until 30 June 2022)
—	DF	ALB	Marash Kumbulla (at Roma until 30 June 2022)
—	DF	ITA	Destiny Udogie (at Udinese until 30 June 2022)
—	DF	ARG	Bruno Amione (at Reggina until 30 June 2022)
—	MF	ITA	Nunzio Brandi (at Lucchese until 30 June 2022)
—	DF	SRB	Bogdan Jočić (at Metalac until 30 June 2022)

No.	Pos.	Nation	Player
—	MF	ITA	Mattia Zaccagni (at Lazio until 30 June 2022)
—	FW	ITA	Lorenzo Bertini (at Mantova until 30 June 2022)
—	FW	SEN	Adama Sane (at Latina until 30 June 2022)
—	FW	POL	Mariusz Stępiński (at Aris Limassol until 30 June 2022)
—	FW	SVK	Ľubomír Tupta (at Slovan Liberec until 30 June 2022)

== Pre-season and friendlies ==
Win Draw Loss Fixtures

24 July 2021 Friendly	Hellas Verona (Italy)	0–0	(Italy) Virtus Verona	Mezzano, Italy
19:00 CEST (UTC+2)				Stadium: Centro Sportivo Intercomunale

29 July 2021 Friendly	Hellas Verona (Italy)	3–2	(Italy) Modena	Veneto, Italy
17:00 CEST (UTC+2)	Lazović 5'; Silvestri 51' (o.g.); Cancellieri 54'	Report	Minesso 39'; Scarsella 68'	Stadium: Campo Sportivo Castelnuovo del Garda; Referee: Francesco Meraviglia

6 August 2021 Friendly	SPAL (Italy)	Cancelled	(Italy) Hellas Verona	Ferrara, Italy
19:30 CEST (UTC+2)				Stadium: Stadio Paolo Mazza

7 August 2021 Friendly	Sampdoria (Italy)	1–0	(Italy) Hellas Verona	Pavia, Italy
19:00 CEST (UTC+2)	Murillo 45+1'	Report		Stadium: Stadio Pietro Fortunati; Referee: Francesco Cosso

== Competitions ==
=== Overall record ===
Competition	First match	Last match	Starting round	Final position	Record							
Competition	First match	Last match	Starting round	Final position	Pld	W	D	L	GF	GA	GD	Win %
Serie A	21 August 2021	22 May 2022	Matchday 1	9th	38	14	10	14	64	59	+5	36.84
Coppa Italia	14 August 2021	15 December 2021	First round	Second round	2	1	0	1	6	4	+2	50.00
Total					40	15	10	15	70	63	+7	37.50

Source: Soccerway

=== Serie A ===
==== League table ====
Pos	Team	Pld	W	D	L	GF	GA	GD	Pts	Qualification or relegation
7	Fiorentina	38	19	5	14	59	51	+8	62	Qualification for the Conference League play-off round (Note: Since the winners of the 2021–22 Coppa Italia, Inter Milan, qualified for the Champions League, the Europa League berth awarded to the Coppa Italia winners was passed to the sixth-placed team, and the Europa Conference League berth awarded to the sixth-placed team was passed to the seventh-placed team.)
8	Atalanta	38	16	11	11	65	48	+17	59	
9	Hellas Verona	38	14	11	13	65	59	+6	53	
10	Torino	38	13	11	14	46	41	+5	50 (Note: Torino finished ahead of Sassuolo on head-to-head points: Sassuolo 0–1 Torino, Torino 1–1 Sassuolo.)	
11	Sassuolo	38	13	11	14	64	66	−2	50	

Source: Serie A
Rules for classification: 1) Points; 2) Head-to-head points; 3) Head-to-head goal difference; 4) Goal difference; 5) Goals scored; 6) Draw. (Note: Head-to-head record is used only after all the matches between the teams in question have been played)

==== Results summary ====
Overall								Home						Away					
Pld	W	D	L	GF	GA	GD	Pts	W	D	L	GF	GA	GD	W	D	L	GF	GA	GD
38	14	11	13	65	59	+6	53	9	3	7	34	25	+9	5	8	6	31	34	−3

Source: Serie A

==== Results by round ====
Round	1	2	3	4	5	6	7	8	9	10	11	12	13	14	15	16	17	18	19	20	21	22	23	24	25	26	27	28	29	30	31	32	33	34	35	36	37	38
Ground	H	H	A	H	A	A	H	A	H	A	H	A	H	A	H	A	H	A	H	A	H	A	H	A	H	A	H	A	H	A	H	A	A	H	A	H	H	A
Result	L	L	L	W	D	D	W	L	W	D	W	D	W	L	D	W	L	L	D	W	L	W	W	L	W	D	W	D	L	D	W	L	W	D	W	L	L	D
Position	13	17	19	14	15	14	12	13	11	10	8	10	9	10	10	10	12	13	12	10	12	10	9	9	9	9	9	9	9	10	9	10	9	9	9	9	9	9

Source: Serie A
A = Away; H = Home; W = Win; D = Draw; L = Loss

==== Matches ====
The league fixtures were announced on 14 July 2021.

21 August 2021 1	Hellas Verona	2–3	Sassuolo	Verona
18:30 CEST (UTC+2)	Veloso (yellow card) 35' (yellow-red card) 45+1'; Zaccagni 70' (pen.), 90'; Di Carmine (yellow card) 75'	Report	Lopez (yellow card) 23'; Raspadori 32'; Đuričić 51', (yellow card) 79'; Traorè 77'	Stadium: Stadio Marcantonio Bentegodi; Attendance: 5,448; Referee: Manuel Volpi

27 August 2021 2	Hellas Verona	1–3	Internazionale	Verona
20:45 CEST (UTC+2)	Ilić 15'; Magnani (yellow card) 28'; Tameze (yellow card) 88'	Report	Martínez 47', (yellow card) 57'; Brozović (yellow card) 65'; Correa 83', 90+4'	Stadium: Stadio Marcantonio Bentegodi; Attendance: 11,214; Referee: Gianluca Manganiello

13 September 2021 3	Bologna	1–0	Hellas Verona	Bologna
20:45 CEST (UTC+2)	Svanberg 78'; Domínguez (yellow card) 90+7'	Report	Barák (yellow card) 49'; Ceccherini (yellow card) 84'; Faraoni (yellow card) 90+8'	Stadium: Stadio Renato Dall'Ara; Attendance: 10,218; Referee: Ivano Pezzuto

19 September 2021 4	Hellas Verona	3–2	Roma	Verona
18:00 CEST (UTC+2)	Faraoni (yellow card) 30', (goal) 63'; Barák 49', (yellow card) 51'; Caprari 54'; Hongla (yellow card) 83'; Casale (yellow card) 86'	Report	Veretout (yellow card) 18'; Pellegrini 36'; Ilić 58' (o.g.); Cristante (yellow card) 71'	Stadium: Stadio Marcantonio Bentegodi; Attendance: 10,148; Referee: Fabio Maresca

22 September 2021 5	Salernitana	2–2	Hellas Verona	Salerno
18:30 CEST (UTC+2)	Gondo 45+2'; M. Coulibaly 76'; Gagliolo (yellow card) 84'; L. Coulibaly (yellow card) 86'	Report	Kalinić 7', 29', (yellow card) 36'; Magnani (yellow card) 41'; Dawidowicz (yellow card) 90'	Stadium: Stadio Arechi; Attendance: 9,561; Referee: Massimiliano Irrati

25 September 2021 6	Genoa	3–3	Hellas Verona	Genoa
20:45 CEST (UTC+2)	Maksimović (yellow card) 48'; Behrami (yellow card) 54'; Pandev (yellow card) 55'; Criscito 77' (pen.); Destro 80', 85'	Report	Simeone 8'; Barák 49' (pen.); Günter (yellow card) 57'; Ilić (yellow card) 62'; Kalinić 90+1'	Stadium: Stadio Luigi Ferraris; Attendance: 13,478; Referee: Daniele Doveri

3 October 2021 7	Hellas Verona	4–0	Spezia	Verona
15:00 CEST (UTC+2)	Simeone 4'; Faraoni 15'; Caprari (yellow card) 28', (goal) 42'; Bessa 71'	Report	Ferrer (yellow card) 40'; Bastoni (red card) 81'	Stadium: Stadio Marcantonio Bentegodi; Attendance: 8,398; Referee: Giacomo Camplone

16 October 2021 8	Milan	3–2	Hellas Verona	Milan
20:45 CEST (UTC+2)	Giroud 59'; Kessié 76' (pen.); Günter 78' (o.g.); Ballo-Touré (yellow card) 81'	Report	Ceccherini (yellow card) 5'; Caprari 7'; Barák 24' (pen.); Kalinić (yellow card) 25'; Casale (yellow card) 38'; Veloso (yellow card) 54'	Stadium: San Siro; Attendance: 40,128; Referee: Alessandro Prontera

24 October 2021 9	Hellas Verona	4–1	Lazio	Verona
15:00 CEST (UTC+2)	Veloso (yellow card) 9'; Simeone 30', 36', 62', 90+2'; Ceccherini (yellow card) 67'	Report	Patric (yellow card) 44'; Immobile 46'; Akpa Akpro (yellow card) 56'	Stadium: Stadio Marcantonio Bentegodi; Attendance: 13,953; Referee: Marco Piccinini

27 October 2021 10	Udinese	1–1	Hellas Verona	Udine
18:30 CEST (UTC+2)	Success 3'; Becão (yellow card) 72'	Report	Dawidowicz (yellow card) 56'; Barák 83' (pen.); Ilić (yellow card) 88'	Stadium: Stadio Friuli; Attendance: 8,751; Referee: Matteo Marchetti

30 October 2021 11	Hellas Verona	2–1	Juventus	Verona
18:00 CEST (UTC+2)	Simeone 11', 14'; Lazović (yellow card) 26'; Casale (yellow card) 57'; Faraoni (yellow card) 61'; Günter (yellow card) 77'	Report	Danilo (yellow card) 29'; Arthur (yellow card) 61'; Morata (yellow card) 77'; McKennie 80'	Stadium: Stadio Marcantonio Bentegodi; Attendance: 22,314; Referee: Livio Marinelli

7 November 2021 12	Napoli	1–1	Hellas Verona	Naples
18:00 CET (UTC+1)	Di Lorenzo 18'; Rrahmani (yellow card) 31'; Osimhen (yellow card) 87'	Report	Simeone 13'; Barák (yellow card) 41'; Veloso (yellow card) 59'; Dawidowicz (yellow card) 68'; Bessa (yellow card) 80' (yellow-red card) 88'; Kalinić (yellow card) 85' (yellow-red card) 90+3'	Stadium: Stadio San Paolo; Attendance: 28,000; Referee: Giovanni Ayroldi

22 November 2021 13	Hellas Verona	2–1	Empoli	Verona
18:30 CET (UTC+1)	Simeone (yellow card) 30'; Barák 49'; Tameze 90+1'	Report	Luperto (yellow card) 43'; Romagnoli 67'; Di Francesco (yellow card) 70'; Bandinelli (yellow card) 81'	Stadium: Stadio Marcantonio Bentegodi; Attendance: 13,797; Referee: Matteo Gariglio

27 November 2021 14	Sampdoria	3–1	Hellas Verona	Genoa
15:00 CET (UTC+1)	Candreva 51'; Bereszyński (yellow card) 56'; Ekdal (yellow card) 69', (goal) 77'; Thorsby (yellow card) 71'; Quagliarella (yellow card) 80'; Murru 90'	Report	Tameze 37'; Faraoni (yellow card) 65'	Stadium: Stadio Luigi Ferraris; Attendance: 6,813; Referee: Lorenzo Maggioni

30 November 2021 15	Hellas Verona	0–0	Cagliari	Verona
20:45 CET (UTC+1)	Günter (yellow card) 35'; Simeone (yellow card) 49'; Lazović (yellow card) 50'	Report	Keita (yellow card) 50'; Cáceres (yellow card) 88'	Stadium: Stadio Marcantonio Bentegodi; Attendance: 12,188; Referee: Matteo Marcenaro

5 December 2021 16	Venezia	3–4	Hellas Verona	Ferrara
15:00 CET (UTC+1)	Ceccaroni 12', (red card) 63'; Črnigoj 19'; Henry 28', (yellow card) 90+5'; Vacca (yellow card) 73'	Report	Magnani (yellow card) 45'; Henry 52' (o.g.); Caprari 65' (pen.); Simeone 67', 85', (yellow card) 87'	Stadium: Stadio Paolo Mazza; Attendance: 7,608; Referee: Alessandro Prontera

12 December 2021 17	Hellas Verona	1–2	Atalanta	Verona
15:00 CET (UTC+1)	Simeone 22'; Ceccherini (yellow card) 42'; Caprari (yellow card) 90+2'	Report	Miranchuk 37'; Koopmeiners 62'; Zapata (yellow card) 86'	Stadium: Stadio Marcantonio Bentegodi; Attendance: 14,788; Referee: Juan Luca Sacchi

19 December 2021 18	Torino	1–0	Hellas Verona	Turin
18:00 CET (UTC+1)	Pobega 26'; Buongiorno (yellow card) 90+2'	Report	Magnani (red card) 25'; Ceccherini (yellow card) 28'; Simeone (yellow card) 65'	Stadium: Stadio Olimpico Grande Torino; Attendance: 6,202; Referee: Michael Fabbri

22 December 2021 19	Hellas Verona	1–1	Fiorentina	Verona
18:30 CET (UTC+1)	Lasagna 17'; Caprari (yellow card) 46'; Ilić (yellow card) 46'	Report	Castrovilli 81'; Terzić (yellow card) 84'	Stadium: Stadio Marcantonio Bentegodi; Attendance: 14,001; Referee: Daniele Doveri

6 January 2022 20	Spezia	1–2	Hellas Verona	La Spezia
14:30 CET (UTC+1)	Verde (yellow card) 75'; Agudelo (yellow card) 78', (red card) 87'; Erlić 85'	Report	Veloso (yellow card) 29'; Casale (yellow card) 45'; Caprari 59', 70'	Stadium: Stadio Alberto Picco; Attendance: 3,250; Referee: Maurizio Mariani

9 January 2022 21	Hellas Verona	1–2	Salernitana	Verona
20:45 CET (UTC+1)	Lazović 63'; Ilić (red card) 89'; Günter (yellow card) 90+2'	Report	Đurić 29' (pen.); Kastanos (yellow card) 31', (goal) 70'; Gyömbér (yellow card) 36'; Di Tacchio (yellow card) 89'	Stadium: Stadio Marcantonio Bentegodi; Attendance: 3,106; Referee: Federico Dionisi

16 January 2022 22	Sassuolo	2–4	Hellas Verona	Reggio Emilia
12:30 CET (UTC+1)	Scamacca 57'; Kyriakopoulos (yellow card) 59'; Defrel 64'; Ferrari (yellow card) 85'	Report	Caprari 37'; Barák 44', 57' (pen.), 90+4'; Depaoli (yellow card) 61'; Ceccherini (yellow card) 65'; Montipò (yellow card) 89'; Kalinić (yellow card) 90+1'	Stadium: Mapei Stadium – Città del Tricolore; Attendance: 3,843; Referee: Alessandro Prontera

21 January 2022 23	Hellas Verona	2–1	Bologna	Verona
20:45 CET (UTC+1)	Caprari 38'; Simeone (yellow card) 43'; Günter (yellow card) 60'; Kalinić 85'	Report	Orsolini 14'; Skorupski (yellow card) 27'; Binks (yellow card) 45+1'; Sansone (yellow card) 50'; Hickey (yellow card) 73'	Stadium: Stadio Marcantonio Bentegodi; Attendance: 4,286; Referee: Matteo Gariglio

6 February 2022 24	Juventus	2–0	Hellas Verona	Turin
20:45 CET (UTC+1)	Vlahović 13'; Zakaria 61'	Report	Depaoli (yellow card) 17'	Stadium: Juventus Stadium; Attendance: 17,016; Referee: Luca Massimi

13 February 2022 25	Hellas Verona	4–0	Udinese	Verona
15:00 CET (UTC+1)	Depaoli 2', (yellow card) 68'; Barák 31'; Tameze (yellow card) 51', (goal) 85'; Caprari 66'; Bessa (yellow card) 90'	Report	Becão (yellow card) 51'	Stadium: Stadio Marcantonio Bentegodi; Attendance: 11,713; Referee: Andrea Colombo

19 February 2022 26	Roma	2–2	Hellas Verona	Rome
18:00 CET (UTC+1)	Pellegrini (yellow card) 38'; Oliveira (yellow card) 39'; Volpato 65'; Karsdorp (yellow card) 69'; Bove 84'	Report	Barák 5'; Casale (yellow card) 16'; Tameze 20'; Günter (yellow card) 89'	Stadium: Stadio Olimpico; Attendance: 34,777; Referee: Luca Pairetto

27 February 2022 27	Hellas Verona	3–1	Venezia	Verona
15:05 CET (UTC+1)	Simeone 54', 63', 88'	Report	Caldara (yellow card) 56'; Okereke 81'	Stadium: Stadio Marcantonio Bentegodi; Attendance: 14,298; Referee: Juan Luca Sacchi

6 March 2022 28	Fiorentina	1–1	Hellas Verona	Florence
15:00 CET (UTC+1)	Piątek 10'	Report	Caprari 20' (pen.); Günter (yellow card) 37'; Simeone (yellow card) 56'; Ceccherini (yellow card) 72'; Bessa (yellow card) 82'	Stadium: Stadio Artemio Franchi; Attendance: 23,491; Referee: Gianluca Manganiello

13 March 2022 29	Hellas Verona	1–2	Napoli	Verona
15:00 CET (UTC+1)	Günter (yellow card) 69'; Ceccherini (yellow card) 70' (yellow-red card) 83'; Faraoni 77', (yellow card) 90+7' (yellow-red card) 90+8'; Ilić (yellow card) 86'	Report	Osimhen 14', 71'	Stadium: Stadio Marcantonio Bentegodi; Attendance: 18,782; Referee: Daniele Doveri

20 March 2022 30	Empoli	1–1	Hellas Verona	Empoli
15:00 CET (UTC+1)	Di Francesco 26'; Asllani (yellow card) 45'; Parisi (yellow card) 75'	Report	Casale (yellow card) 35'; Simeone (penalty missed) 65', (yellow card) 67'; Cancellieri 72', (yellow card) 77'	Stadium: Stadio Carlo Castellani; Attendance: 5,445; Referee: Matteo Marcenaro

4 April 2022 31	Hellas Verona	1–0	Genoa	Verona
18:30 CEST (UTC+2)	Simeone 5'; Ceccherini (yellow card) 36'; Tameze (yellow card) 38'; Bessa (yellow card) 65'; Casale (yellow card) 72'	Report	Sturaro (yellow card) 2'; Guðmundsson (yellow card) 45'; Hefti (yellow card) 76'	Stadium: Stadio Marcantonio Bentegodi; Attendance: 14,993; Referee: Francesco Fourneau

9 April 2022 32	Internazionale	2–0	Hellas Verona	Milan
18:00 CEST (UTC+2)	Barella 22'; Džeko 30'; Dumfries (yellow card) 84'; Brozović (yellow card) 90+1'	Report		Stadium: San Siro; Attendance: 61,325; Referee: Livio Marinelli

18 April 2022 33	Atalanta	1–2	Hellas Verona	Bergamo
21:00 CEST (UTC+2)	Palomino (yellow card) 25'; Malinovskyi (yellow card) 30'; Koopmeiners (yellow card) 58'; Scalvini 82'	Report	Günter (yellow card) 9'; Casale (yellow card) 21'; Ceccherini 45+2', (yellow card) 67'; Koopmeiners 55' (o.g.)	Stadium: Gewiss Stadium; Attendance: 14,537; Referee: Marco Piccinini

23 April 2022 34	Hellas Verona	1–1	Sampdoria	Verona
20:45 CEST (UTC+2)	Günter (yellow card) 43'; Caprari 78'	Report	Rincón (yellow card) 32'; Caputo (penalty missed) 44', 44'; Vieira (yellow card) 51'; Bereszyński (yellow card) 80'	Stadium: Stadio Marcantonio Bentegodi; Attendance: 16,188; Referee: Giovanni Ayroldi

30 April 2022 35	Cagliari	1–2	Hellas Verona	Cagliari
15:00 CEST (UTC+2)	Pavoletti (yellow card) 51'; João Pedro 57'; Carboni (yellow card) 90'	Report	Barák 8', (yellow card) 22'; Tameze (yellow card) 23'; Caprari 44'; Hongla (yellow card) 56'; Simeone (yellow card) 77'	Stadium: Unipol Domus; Attendance: 16,267; Referee: Daniele Orsato

8 May 2022 36	Hellas Verona	1–3	Milan	Verona
20:45 CEST (UTC+2)	Faraoni 38', (yellow card) 45+1'; Ilić (yellow card) 70'	Report	Leão (yellow card) 45+1'; Tonali 45+3', 50'; Florenzi 87'	Stadium: Stadio Marcantonio Bentegodi; Attendance: 30,154; Referee: Daniele Doveri

14 May 2022 37	Hellas Verona	0–1	Torino	Verona
18:00 CEST (UTC+2)	Günter (yellow card) 28'; Casale (yellow card) 29'; Caprari (yellow card) 43'	Report	Brekalo 19'; Izzo (yellow card) 43'; Praet (yellow card) 80'	Stadium: Stadio Marcantonio Bentegodi; Attendance: 24,001; Referee: Giacomo Camplone

21 May 2022 38	Lazio	3–3	Hellas Verona	Rome
20:45 CEST (UTC+2)	Cabral 16'; Luiz Felipe (yellow card) 20'; Felipe Anderson 29'; Pedro 62'; Lucas (yellow card) 85'	Report	Hongla (yellow card) 3', (goal) 76'; Simeone 6'; Lasagna 14', (yellow card) 90+3'; Veloso (yellow card) 23'; Ceccherini (yellow card) 44'; Faraoni (yellow card) 45+4'; Casale (yellow card) 53'	Stadium: Stadio Olimpico; Attendance: 55,098; Referee: Andrea Colombo

=== Coppa Italia ===
14 August 2021 First round	Hellas Verona	3–0	Catanzaro	Verona
20:45 CEST (UTC+2)	Günter (yellow card) 17', (goal) 23'; Fazio 33' (o.g.); Lazović 42'	Report		Stadium: Stadio Marcantonio Bentegodi; Attendance: 1,784; Referee: Luca Pairetto

15 December 2021 Second round	Hellas Verona	3–4	Empoli	Verona
15:00 CET (UTC+1)	Cancellieri 18'; Ilić 86'; Ragusa 88'; Šutalo (yellow card) 90+1'; Hongla (yellow card) 90+2'	Report	La Mantia 15', (red card) 90+3'; Štulac (yellow card) 38'; Romagnoli (yellow card) 45+4'; Mancuso 66' (pen.), 70'; Bajrami 74'; Cutrone (yellow card) 90+2'	Stadium: Stadio Marcantonio Bentegodi; Attendance: 1,101; Referee: Federico Dionisi

== Statistics ==
=== Appearances and goals ===
No.	Pos	Nat	Player	Total		Serie A		Coppa Italia	
No.	Pos	Nat	Player	Apps	Goals	Apps	Goals	Apps	Goals
Goalkeepers
1	GK	(Croatia) CRO	Ivor Pandur	3	0	1	0	2	0
96	GK	(Italy) ITA	Lorenzo Montipò	16	0	16	0	0	0
Defenders
5	DF	(Italy) ITA	Davide Faraoni	16	2	16	2	0	0
15	DF	(Turkey) TUR	Mert Cetin	3	0	0+2	0	1	0
16	DF	(Italy) ITA	Nicolò Casale	17	0	12+4	0	0+1	0
17	DF	(Italy) ITA	Federico Ceccherini	16	0	11+4	0	1	0
21	DF	(Germany) GER	Koray Günter	14	1	13	0	1	1
23	DF	(Italy) ITA	Giangiacomo Magnani	14	0	4+9	0	0+1	0
27	DF	(Poland) POL	Pawel Dawidowicz	16	0	13+2	0	1	0
30	DF	(Italy) ITA	Gianluca Frabotta	0	0	0	0	0	0
31	DF	(Croatia) CRO	Boško Šutalo	9	0	1+7	0	1	0
42	DF	(Italy) ITA	Diego Coppola	1	0	0	0	1	0
Midfielders
4	MF	(Portugal) POR	Miguel Veloso	13	0	9+2	0	2	0
7	MF	(Czech Republic) CZE	Antonín Barák	16	5	15	5	1	0
8	MF	(Serbia) SRB	Darko Lazović	17	1	14+2	0	1	1
14	MF	(Serbia) SRB	Ivan Ilić	16	2	12+2	1	0+2	1
20	MF	(Switzerland) SUI	Kevin Rüegg	1	0	0	0	1	0
24	MF	(Italy) ITA	Daniel Bessa	10	1	2+7	1	1	0
61	MF	(Cameroon) CMR	Adrien Tameze	19	2	9+8	2	1+1	0
78	MF	(Cameroon) CMR	Martin Hongla	10	0	4+4	0	1+1	0
97	MF	(Italy) ITA	Filippo Terracciano	1	0	0	0	0+1	0
Forwards
9	FW	(Croatia) CRO	Nikola Kalinić	10	3	4+5	3	1	0
10	FW	(Italy) ITA	Gianluca Caprari	15	4	13+2	4	0	0
11	FW	(Italy) ITA	Kevin Lasagna	11	0	3+7	0	1	0
18	FW	(Italy) ITA	Matteo Cancellieri	8	1	1+5	0	2	1
32	FW	(Italy) ITA	Antonino Ragusa	1	1	0	0	1	1
71	FW	(Italy) ITA	Mattia Florio	1	0	0	0	0+1	0
99	FW	(Argentina) ARG	Giovanni Simeone	15	12	12+3	12	0	0
Players transferred out during the season
10	FW	(Italy) ITA	Mattia Zaccagni	3	2	2	2	1	0
Players transferred out during the season

Last updated: 15 December 2021
Source: Competitions
