= 2020–21 Hellas Verona FC season =

Hellas Verona
2020–21 season
- President: Maurizio Setti
- Manager: Ivan Jurić
- Stadium: Stadio Marcantonio Bentegodi
- Serie A: 10th
- Coppa Italia: Fourth round
- Top goalscorer: League: Antonín Barák (7); All: Antonín Barák (7)
Home colours	Away colours	Third colours

The 2020–21 season was the 117th season in existence of Hellas Verona and the club's second consecutive season in the top flight of Italian football. In addition to the domestic league, Hellas Verona participated in this season's edition of the Coppa Italia. The season covered the period from 3 August 2020 to 30 June 2021.

== Players ==
=== First team squad ===
As of 29 January 2021

Note: Flags indicate national team as defined under FIFA eligibility rules; some limited exceptions apply. Players may hold more than one non-FIFA nationality.

No.	Pos.	Nation	Player
1	GK	ITA	Marco Silvestri
3	DF	ITA	Federico Dimarco (on loan from Inter Milan)
4	MF	POR	Miguel Veloso (captain)
5	DF	ITA	Davide Faraoni (vice-captain)
6	DF	ITA	Matteo Lovato
7	MF	CZE	Antonín Barák (on loan from Udinese)
8	MF	SRB	Darko Lazović
9	FW	ITA	Eddie Salcedo (on loan from Inter Milan)
11	FW	ITA	Andrea Favilli (on loan from Genoa)
12	GK	ITA	Nicola Borghetto
13	DF	ITA	Destiny Udogie
14	MF	SRB	Ivan Ilić (on loan from Manchester City)
15	DF	TUR	Mert Çetin (on loan from Roma)
17	DF	ITA	Federico Ceccherini (on loan from Fiorentina)
19	MF	SUI	Kevin Rüegg
20	MF	ITA	Mattia Zaccagni

No.	Pos.	Nation	Player
21	DF	GER	Koray Günter
22	GK	ITA	Alessandro Berardi
23	DF	ITA	Giangiacomo Magnani (on loan from Sassuolo)
24	MF	ITA	Marco Benassi (on loan from Fiorentina)
25	GK	CRO	Ivor Pandur
26	MF	ENG	Ronaldo Vieira (on loan from Sampdoria)
27	DF	POL	Paweł Dawidowicz
29	FW	CRO	Nikola Kalinić
33	MF	ITA	Stefano Sturaro (on loan from Genoa)
36	DF	ARG	Bruno Amione
40	MF	ITA	Daniel Bessa
45	FW	GHA	Philip Yeboah
61	MF	FRA	Adrien Tameze
90	FW	GAM	Ebrima Colley (on loan from Atalanta)
92	FW	ITA	Kevin Lasagna (on loan from Udinese)

=== Other players under contract ===
Note: Flags indicate national team as defined under FIFA eligibility rules; some limited exceptions apply. Players may hold more than one non-FIFA nationality.

No.	Pos.	Nation	Player
99	FW	ITA	Lorenzo Bertini
—	DF	ITA	Edoardo Pavan

No.	Pos.	Nation	Player
—	MF	SEN	Bachir Mané

=== On loan ===
As of 10 February 2021

Note: Flags indicate national team as defined under FIFA eligibility rules; some limited exceptions apply. Players may hold more than one non-FIFA nationality.

No.	Pos.	Nation	Player
—	GK	ITA	Mattia Chiesa (at Virtus Verona until 30 June 2021)
—	DF	ITA	Rayyan Baniya (at Mantova until 30 June 2021)
—	DF	ITA	Salvatore Bocchetti (at Pescara until 30 June 2021)
—	DF	ITA	Nicolò Casale (at Empoli until 30 June 2021)
—	DF	BRA	Alan Empereur (at (Brazil) Palmeiras until 30 June 2021)
—	DF	ALB	Marash Kumbulla (at Roma until 30 June 2022)
—	MF	ITA	Nunzio Brandi (at Turris until 30 June 2021)
—	MF	ITA	Andrea Danzi (at Ascoli until 30 June 2021)

No.	Pos.	Nation	Player
—	MF	BRA	Lucas Felippe (at Mantova until 30 June 2021)
—	MF	TUN	Karim Laribi (at Reggiana until 30 June 2021)
—	FW	ITA	Antonino Ragusa (at Brescia until 30 June 2022)
—	FW	SEN	Adama Sane (at Mantova until 30 June 2022)
—	FW	POL	Mariusz Stępiński (at Lecce until 30 June 2021)
—	FW	SVK	Ľubomír Tupta (at (Switzerland) FC Sion until 30 June 2021)
—	FW	ITA	Michele Vano (at Perugia until 30 June 2021, obligation to buy)
—	FW	ITA	Samuel Di Carmine (at Crotone until 30 June 2021)

== Transfers ==
=== In ===
No.	Pos	Player	Transferred from	Fee	Date	Source
15			TBD		1 July 2020	

=== Out ===
No.	Pos	Player	Transferred to	Fee	Date	Source
15			TBD		1 July 2020	

== Pre-season and friendlies ==
Win Draw Loss Fixtures

4 September 2020 Friendly	Hartberg (Austria)	Cancelled	(Italy) Hellas Verona	Hartberg, Austria
18:00 CEST (UTC+2)				Stadium: Profertil Arena Hartberg

6 September 2020 Friendly	Hellas Verona (Italy)	4–3	(Slovenia) Gorica	Brione, Italy
16:00 CEST (UTC+2)				Stadium: Stadio Quercia

12 September 2020 Friendly	Hellas Verona (Italy)	0–1	(Italy) Cremonese	Sardinia, Italy
18:00 CEST (UTC+2)		Report	Celar 32'	Stadium: Sporting Center Paradiso; Referee: Nicola Lipizer

== Competitions ==
=== Overview ===
Competition	First match	Last match	Starting round	Final position	Record							
Competition	First match	Last match	Starting round	Final position	Pld	W	D	L	GF	GA	GD	Win %
Serie A	19 September 2020	23 May 2021	Matchday 1	10th	38	11	12	15	46	48	−2	28.95
Coppa Italia	28 October 2020	25 November 2020	Third round	Fourth round	2	0	1	1	4	5	−1	0.00
Total					40	11	13	16	50	53	−3	27.50

Last updated: 23 May 2021
Source: Soccerway

Note: Serie A match against Roma originally ended in a 0–0 draw.

=== Serie A ===
==== League table ====
Pos	Team	Pld	W	D	L	GF	GA	GD	Pts
8	Sassuolo	38	17	11	10	64	56	+8	62
9	Sampdoria	38	15	7	16	52	54	−2	52
10	Hellas Verona	38	11	12	15	46	48	−2	45
11	Genoa	38	10	12	16	47	58	−11	42
12	Bologna	38	10	11	17	51	65	−14	41

Source: Serie A, Soccerway
Rules for classification: 1) Points; 2) Head-to-head points; 3) Head-to-head goal difference; 4) Goal difference; 5) Goals scored; 6) Draw. (Note: Head-to-head record is used only after all the matches between the teams in question have been played)

==== Results summary ====
Overall								Home						Away					
Pld	W	D	L	GF	GA	GD	Pts	W	D	L	GF	GA	GD	W	D	L	GF	GA	GD
38	11	12	15	46	48	−2	45	6	6	7	23	23	0	5	6	8	23	25	−2

Last updated: 23 May 2021.
Source: Serie A

==== Results by round ====
Round	1	2	3	4	5	6	7	8	9	10	11	12	13	14	15	16	17	18	19	20	21	22	23	24	25	26	27	28	29	30	31	32	33	34	35	36	37	38
Ground	H	H	A	H	A	H	A	H	A	H	A	H	A	H	A	A	H	A	H	A	A	H	A	H	A	H	A	H	A	H	A	H	A	H	H	A	H	A
Result	W	W	L	D	D	W	D	L	W	D	W	L	D	L	W	D	W	L	W	L	L	W	D	D	W	L	L	L	W	L	L	L	L	D	D	L	D	D
Position	2	5	8	7	8	7	8	9	7	8	7	7	9	9	8	9	9	9	8	9	9	9	9	8	8	8	9	9	8	9	9	10	10	10	10	10	10	10

Updated to match(es) played on 23 May 2021. Source: Serie A
A = Away; H = Home; W = Win; D = Draw; L = Loss

==== Matches ====
The league fixtures were announced on 2 September 2020.

19 September 2020 1	Hellas Verona	3–0	Roma	Verona
20:45 CEST (UTC+2)	Danzi (yellow card) 10'; Di Carmine (yellow card) 45+1'	Report		Stadium: Stadio Marcantonio Bentegodi; Referee: Daniele Chiffi
Note: Hellas Verona were awarded a 3–0 win over Roma on 22 September as a result of Roma irregularly fielding Amadou Diawara during the match. Diawara had been registered to the under-22 squad list, despite turning 23 and being eligible for the senior list. The match had originally ended 0–0.

27 September 2020 2	Hellas Verona	1–0	Udinese	Verona
15:00 CEST (UTC+2)	Favilli (yellow card) 51', (goal) 57'	Report		Stadium: Stadio Marcantonio Bentegodi; Referee: Manuel Volpi

4 October 2020 3	Parma	1–0	Hellas Verona	Parma
15:00 CEST (UTC+2)	Kurtić 1'; Alves (yellow card) 20'	Report	Dimarco (yellow card) 66'	Stadium: Stadio Ennio Tardini; Referee: Antonio Giua

19 October 2020 4	Hellas Verona	0–0	Genoa	Verona
20:45 CEST (UTC+2)	Tameze (yellow card) 53'	Report	Badelj (yellow card) 11'; Pandev (yellow card) 43'; Ghiglione (yellow card) 54'; Goldaniga (yellow card) 85'	Stadium: Stadio Marcantonio Bentegodi; Referee: Antonio Rapuano

25 October 2020 5	Juventus	1–1	Hellas Verona	Turin
20:45 CET (UTC+1)	Kulusevski 78', (yellow card) 90+2'	Report	Vieira (yellow card) 39'; Lazović (yellow card) 57'; Favilli 60'; Empereur (yellow card) 69'; Faraoni (yellow card) 90+2'	Stadium: Allianz Stadium; Referee: Fabrizio Pasqua

2 November 2020 6	Hellas Verona	3–1	Benevento	Verona
20:45 CET (UTC+1)	Barák 17', 63', (yellow card) 29'; Lovato (yellow card) 44'; Zaccagni (yellow card) 65'; Lazović (yellow card) 76', (goal) 77'; Magnani (yellow card) 83'	Report	Caldirola (yellow card) 25'; Schiattarella (yellow card) 43'; Glik (yellow card) 55'; Lapadula 56'; Ioniță (yellow card) 71'; Caprari (red card) 73'	Stadium: Stadio Marcantonio Bentegodi; Attendance: 0 Referee: Juan Luca Sacchi

8 November 2020 7	Milan	2–2	Hellas Verona	Milan
20:45 CET (UTC+1)	Magnani 27' (o.g.); Bennacer (yellow card) 54'; Ibrahimović (penalty missed) 65', 90+3'	Report	Barák 6'; Calabria 19' (o.g.); Ceccherini (yellow card) 33'; Lovato (yellow card) 42'; Tameze (yellow card) 90+1'	Stadium: San Siro; Attendance: 0 Referee: Marco Guida

22 November 2020 8	Hellas Verona	0–2	Sassuolo	Verona
15:00 CET (UTC+1)	Dimarco (yellow card) 45+1'	Report	Boga 42'; Lopez (yellow card) 55'; Locatelli (yellow card) 60'; Berardi 76'; Marlon (yellow card) 90'	Stadium: Stadio Marcantonio Bentegodi; Attendance: 0 Referee: Daniele Chiffi

28 November 2020 9	Atalanta	0–2	Hellas Verona	Bergamo
20:45 CET (UTC+1)	Tolói (yellow card) 60'; Amad (yellow card) 80'	Report	Ceccherini (yellow card) 39'; Dawidowicz (yellow card) 45'; Veloso 62' (pen.), (yellow card) 81'; Zaccagni 83'	Stadium: Gewiss Stadium; Attendance: 0 Referee: Davide Massa

6 December 2020 10	Hellas Verona	1–1	Cagliari	Verona
12:30 CET (UTC+1)	Zaccagni 21'; Ceccherini (yellow card) 22'; Salcedo (yellow card) 81'	Report	Marin 48'	Stadium: Stadio Marcantonio Bentegodi; Attendance: 0 Referee: Gianluca Manganiello

12 December 2020 11	Lazio	1–2	Hellas Verona	Rome
20:45 CET (UTC+1)	Caicedo 56', (yellow card) 64'; Akpa Akpro (yellow card) 59'; Reina (yellow card) 68'; Marušić (yellow card) 79'; Farès (yellow card) 87'	Report	Lazzari 45' (o.g.); Tameze 67'; Salcedo (yellow card) 74'; Magnani (yellow card) 78'; Colley (yellow card) 90'	Stadium: Stadio Olimpico; Attendance: 0 Referee: Rosario Abisso

16 December 2020 12	Hellas Verona	1–2	Sampdoria	Verona
20:45 CET (UTC+1)	Faraoni (yellow card) 57'; Zaccagni 70' (pen.); Salcedo (yellow card) 77'; Barák (red card) 90+4'	Report	Verre (yellow card) 20', (goal) 54'; Tonelli (yellow card) 29'; Ekdal 41'; Damsgaard (yellow card) 69'; Silva (yellow card) 90'	Stadium: Stadio Marcantonio Bentegodi; Attendance: 0 Referee: Riccardo Ros

19 December 2020 13	Fiorentina	1–1	Hellas Verona	Florence
15:00 CET (UTC+1)	Bonaventura (yellow card) 14'; Vlahović 19' (pen.); Igor (yellow card) 69'	Report	Veloso 8' (pen.); Dimarco (yellow card) 27'; Ceccherini (yellow card) 34'	Stadium: Stadio Artemio Franchi; Attendance: 0 Referee: Francesco Fourneau

23 December 2020 14	Hellas Verona	1–2	Internazionale	Verona
18:30 CET (UTC+1)	Dawidowicz (yellow card) 29'; Zaccagni (yellow card) 45+3'; Ilić 63'; Dimarco (yellow card) 64'; Magnani (yellow card) 79'	Report	Brozović (yellow card) 45+1'; Martínez 52'; Škriniar 69'; Bastoni (yellow card) 83'	Stadium: Stadio Marcantonio Bentegodi; Attendance: 0 Referee: Piero Giacomelli

3 January 2021 15	Spezia	0–1	Hellas Verona	La Spezia
15:00 CET (UTC+1)	Chabot (yellow card) 12' (yellow-red card) 69'; Estévez (yellow card) 35'; Pobega (yellow card) 66'; Erlić (yellow card) 77'; Agoumé (yellow card) 79'	Report	Zaccagni 75'	Stadium: Stadio Alberto Picco; Attendance: 0 Referee: Luca Pairetto

6 January 2021 16	Torino	1–1	Hellas Verona	Turin
15:00 CET (UTC+1)	Belotti (yellow card) 45+3'; Bremer 84'	Report	Faraoni (yellow card) 30'; Ceccherini (yellow card) 61'; Dimarco 67'; Barák (yellow card) 80'	Stadium: Stadio Olimpico Grande Torino; Attendance: 0 Referee: Marco Di Bello

10 January 2021 17	Hellas Verona	2–1	Crotone	Verona
15:00 CET (UTC+1)	Ceccherini (yellow card) 13'; Kalinić 16'; Dimarco 25'; Lovato (yellow card) 42'; Magnani (yellow card) 53'	Report	Djidji (yellow card) 47'; Messias 55'; Reca (yellow card) 56'; Pereira (yellow card) 89'	Stadium: Stadio Marcantonio Bentegodi; Attendance: 0 Referee: Luca Massimi

16 January 2021 18	Bologna	1–0	Hellas Verona	Bologna
15:00 CET (UTC+1)	Orsolini 19' (pen.); Dijks (yellow card) 54'; Domínguez (yellow card) 70'	Report	Zaccagni (yellow card) 36'	Stadium: Stadio Renato Dall'Ara; Attendance: 0 Referee: Maurizio Mariani

24 January 2021 19	Hellas Verona	3–1	Napoli	Verona
15:00 CET (UTC+1)	Dimarco 34'; Magnani (yellow card) 60'; Barák 62'; Zaccagni 79', (yellow card) 80'	Report	Lozano 1'; Demme (yellow card) 16'; Di Lorenzo (yellow card) 54'; Koulibaly (yellow card) 71'	Stadium: Stadio Marcantonio Bentegodi; Attendance: 0 Referee: Michael Fabbri

31 January 2021 20	Roma	3–1	Hellas Verona	Rome
20:45 CET (UTC+1)	Pellegrini (yellow card) 17'; Mancini 20'; Mkhitaryan 22'; Mayoral 29'; Kumbulla (yellow card) 38'	Report	Faraoni (yellow card) 23'; Colley 62'	Stadium: Stadio Olimpico; Attendance: 0 Referee: Marco Piccinini

7 February 2021 21	Udinese	2–0	Hellas Verona	Udine
15:00 CET (UTC+1)	Llorente (yellow card) 25'; Arslan (yellow card) 31'; Silvestri 83' (o.g.); Deulofeu 90+1'	Report	Tameze (yellow card) 18'; Dawidowicz (yellow card) 24'; Zaccagni (yellow card) 35'; Faraoni (yellow card) 86'	Stadium: Stadio Friuli; Attendance: 0 Referee: Alberto Santoro

15 February 2021 22	Hellas Verona	2–1	Parma	Verona
20:45 CET (UTC+1)	Silvestri (yellow card) 7'; Grassi 13' (o.g.); Dimarco (yellow card) 39'; Günter (yellow card) 52'; Barák 61'; Lovato (yellow card) 90+1'	Report	Kucka 8' (pen.); Cornelius (yellow card) 36'; Mihăilă (yellow card) 86'	Stadium: Stadio Marcantonio Bentegodi; Attendance: 0 Referee: Luca Massimi

20 February 2021 23	Genoa	2–2	Hellas Verona	Genoa
18:00 CET (UTC+1)	Shomurodov 48'; Strootman (yellow card) 57'; Badelj 90+4'	Report	Ilić 17'; Faraoni 61'; Çetin (yellow card) 74'	Stadium: Stadio Luigi Ferraris; Attendance: 0 Referee: Matteo Marchetti

27 February 2021 24	Hellas Verona	1–1	Juventus	Verona
20:45 CET (UTC+1)	Barák (yellow card) 45+1', (goal) 77'; Dawidowicz (yellow card) 90+1'	Report	Ramsey (yellow card) 18'; De Ligt (yellow card) 33'; Ronaldo 49'	Stadium: Stadio Marcantonio Bentegodi; Attendance: 0 Referee: Fabio Maresca

3 March 2021 25	Benevento	0–3	Hellas Verona	Benevento
20:45 CET (UTC+1)		Report	Faraoni 25'; Foulon 34' (o.g.); Lasagna 50'; Sturaro (yellow card) 72'	Stadium: Stadio Ciro Vigorito; Attendance: 0 Referee: Giovanni Ayroldi

7 March 2021 26	Hellas Verona	0–2	Milan	Verona
15:00 CET (UTC+1)	Magnani (yellow card) 26'; Bessa (yellow card) 90+3'	Report	Krunić 27'; Dalot 50'	Stadium: Stadio Marcantonio Bentegodi; Attendance: 0 Referee: Daniele Orsato

13 March 2021 27	Sassuolo	3–2	Hellas Verona	Reggio Emilia
15:00 CET (UTC+1)	Locatelli 4', (yellow card) 76'; Đuričić 51', (yellow card) 52'; Traorè 81', (yellow card) 90+3'	Report	Faraoni (yellow card) 29'; Lazović 43'; Magnani (yellow card) 55'; Dimarco 79'	Stadium: Mapei Stadium; Attendance: 0 Referee: Alessandro Prontera

21 March 2021 28	Hellas Verona	0–2	Atalanta	Verona
12:30 CET (UTC+1)	Ceccherini (yellow card) 27'; Dawidowicz (yellow card) 28'; Sturaro (yellow card) 72'	Report	Malinovskyi 33' (pen.); Zapata 42'; Toloi (yellow card) 60'; Romero (yellow card) 64'	Stadium: Stadio Marcantonio Bentegodi; Attendance: 0 Referee: Luca Pairetto

3 April 2021 29	Cagliari	0–2	Hellas Verona	Cagliari
15:00 CEST (UTC+2)	Klavan (yellow card) 25'	Report	Lovato (yellow card) 6'; Barák 54'; Sturaro (yellow card) 88'; Lazović (yellow card) 90+4'; Lasagna 90+8'	Stadium: Sardegna Arena; Attendance: 0 Referee: Daniele Doveri

11 April 2021 30	Hellas Verona	0–1	Lazio	Verona
15:00 CEST (UTC+2)		Report	Caicedo (yellow card) 49'; Luis Alberto (yellow card) 72'; Milinković-Savić 90+2'	Stadium: Stadio Marcantonio Bentegodi; Attendance: 0 Referee: Daniele Chiffi

17 April 2021 31	Sampdoria	3–1	Hellas Verona	Genoa
15:00 CEST (UTC+2)	Verre (yellow card) 13'; Jankto 46'; Gabbiadini 73' (pen.); Thorsby 82'; Keita (yellow card) 83'; Yoshida (yellow card) 85'	Report	Lazović 13'; Faraoni (yellow card) 61'; Tameze (yellow card) 72'; Dawidowicz (yellow card) 81'	Stadium: Stadio Luigi Ferraris; Attendance: 0 Referee: Federico Dionisi

20 April 2021 32	Hellas Verona	1–2	Fiorentina	Verona
20:45 CEST (UTC+2)	Günter (yellow card) 68'; Salcedo 72'; Sturaro (yellow card) 90+1'	Report	Bonaventura (yellow card) 19'; Vlahović 45+2' (pen.); Cáceres 65'; Kouamé (yellow card) 90+3'; Martínez Quarta (yellow card) 90+5'	Stadium: Stadio Marcantonio Bentegodi; Attendance: 0 Referee: Alessandro Prontera

25 April 2021 33	Internazionale	1–0	Hellas Verona	Milan
15:00 CEST (UTC+2)	Darmian 76'	Report	Ceccherini (yellow card) 28'; Magnani (yellow card) 42'; Barák (yellow card) 68'	Stadium: San Siro; Attendance: 0 Referee: Rosario Abisso

1 May 2021 34	Hellas Verona	1–1	Spezia	Verona
15:00 CEST (UTC+2)	Zaccagni (yellow card) 15'; Dawidowicz (yellow card) 38'; Sturaro (yellow card) 40'; Salcedo 46'; Ilić (yellow card) 69'; Tameze (yellow card) 71'; Faraoni (yellow card) 84'	Report	Nzola (yellow card) 13'; Chabot (yellow card) 50'; Saponara 86'	Stadium: Stadio Marcantonio Bentegodi; Attendance: 0 Referee: Manuel Volpi

9 May 2021 35	Hellas Verona	1–1	Torino	Verona
15:00 CEST (UTC+2)	Dawidowicz (yellow card) 34'; Günter (yellow card) 83'; Dimarco 88'; Kalinić (yellow card) 89'	Report	Nkoulou (yellow card) 38'; Vojvoda 85', (yellow card) 87'; Mandragora (yellow card) 90+5'	Stadium: Stadio Marcantonio Bentegodi; Attendance: 0 Referee: Davide Massa

13 May 2021 36	Crotone	2–1	Hellas Verona	Crotone
20:45 CEST (UTC+2)	Ounas 2'; Magallán (yellow card) 21'; Marrone (yellow card) 32'; Pereira (yellow card) 60'; Messias 75'	Report	Tameze (yellow card) 41'; Molina 87' (o.g.)	Stadium: Stadio Ezio Scida; Attendance: 0 Referee: Luca Massimi

17 May 2021 37	Hellas Verona	2–2	Bologna	Verona
20:45 CEST (UTC+2)	Faraoni 2'; Günter (yellow card) 41'; Barák (yellow card) 49'; Kalinić 53', (yellow card) 73'	Report	De Silvestri 32'; Dijks (yellow card) 52'; Schouten (yellow card) 56'; Soriano (yellow card) 69'; Palacio 82'	Stadium: Stadio Marcantonio Bentegodi; Attendance: 0 Referee: Matteo Marchetti

23 May 2021 38	Napoli	1–1	Hellas Verona	Naples
20:45 CEST (UTC+2)	Lozano (yellow card) 20'; Rrahmani 60'; Bakayoko (yellow card) 71'; Hysaj (yellow card) 88'	Report	Ilić (yellow card) 32'; Dawidowicz (yellow card) 38'; Udogie (yellow card) 54'; Dimarco (yellow card) 56'; Faraoni 69'	Stadium: Stadio San Paolo; Attendance: 0 Referee: Daniele Chiffi

=== Coppa Italia ===
28 October 2020 Third round	Hellas Verona	3–3 (a.e.t.) (3–1 p)	Venezia	Verona
17:00 CET (UTC+1)	Ilić 41'; Salcedo 59'; Rüegg (yellow card) 69'; Empereur (yellow card) 72'; Vieira 110'	Report	Rossi (yellow card) 48'; Cremonesi (yellow card) 49'; Johnsen 84'; Capello 87'; Modulo 98'	Stadium: Stadio Marcantonio Bentegodi; Referee: Giacomo Camplone
	Penalties
	Lazović (penalty scored); Barák (penalty scored); Colley (penalty scored)		(penalty missed) Modolo; (penalty missed) Johnsen; (penalty scored) Fiordilino; (penalty missed) Capello

25 November 2020 Fourth round	Cagliari	2–1	Hellas Verona	Cagliari
17:30 CET (UTC+1)	Cerri 30'; João Pedro (yellow card) 53'; Sottil 90+3'	Report	Danzi (yellow card) 15'; Amione (yellow card) 40'; Dawidowicz (yellow card) 41'; Colley 74'	Stadium: Sardegna Arena; Referee: Alessandro Prontera

== Statistics ==
=== Appearances and goals ===
No.	Pos	Nat	Player	Total		Serie A		Coppa Italia	
No.	Pos	Nat	Player	Apps	Goals	Apps	Goals	Apps	Goals
Goalkeepers
1	GK	(Italy) ITA	Marco Silvestri	34	0	34	0	0	0
12	GK	(Italy) ITA	Nicola Borghetto	0	0	0	0	0	0
22	GK	(Italy) ITA	Alessandro Berardi	1	0	0+1	0	0	0
25	GK	(Croatia) CRO	Ivor Pandur	6	0	4	0	2	0
Defenders
3	DF	(Italy) ITA	Federico Dimarco	37	5	29+6	5	0+2	0
5	DF	(Italy) ITA	Davide Faraoni	36	4	33+1	4	2	0
6	DF	(Italy) ITA	Matteo Lovato	24	0	14+10	0	0	0
13	DF	(Italy) ITA	Destiny Udogie	7	0	0+6	0	1	0
15	DF	(Turkey) TUR	Mert Çetin	7	0	4+2	0	1	0
17	DF	(Italy) ITA	Federico Ceccherini	26	0	23+2	0	0+1	0
21	DF	(Germany) GER	Koray Günter	27	0	21+6	0	0	0
23	DF	(Italy) ITA	Giangiacomo Magnani	26	0	15+10	0	1	0
27	DF	(Poland) POL	Paweł Dawidowicz	32	0	22+8	0	1+1	0
36	DF	(Argentina) ARG	Bruno Amione	2	0	0	0	1+1	0
Midfielders
4	MF	(Portugal) POR	Miguel Veloso	22	2	15+6	2	1	0
7	MF	(Czech Republic) CZE	Antonín Barák	36	7	32+2	7	1+1	0
8	MF	(Serbia) SRB	Darko Lazović	33	3	27+5	3	1	0
14	MF	(Serbia) SRB	Ivan Ilić	30	3	19+10	2	1	1
19	MF	(Switzerland) SUI	Kevin Rüegg	8	0	1+6	0	1	0
20	MF	(Italy) ITA	Mattia Zaccagni	37	5	33+3	5	1	0
24	MF	(Italy) ITA	Marco Benassi	0	0	0	0	0	0
26	MF	(England) ENG	Ronaldo Vieira	5	1	2+2	0	1	1
33	MF	(Italy) ITA	Stefano Sturaro	10	0	4+6	0	0	0
40	MF	(Italy) ITA	Daniel Bessa	18	0	4+14	0	0	0
61	MF	(France) FRA	Adrien Tameze	35	1	28+5	1	0+2	0
Forwards
9	FW	(Italy) ITA	Eddie Salcedo	23	3	7+14	2	2	1
11	FW	(Italy) ITA	Andrea Favilli	11	2	2+9	2	0	0
29	FW	(Croatia) CRO	Nikola Kalinić	19	2	15+4	2	0	0
45	FW	(Ghana) GHA	Philip Yeboah	1	0	0+1	0	0	0
90	FW	(The Gambia) GAM	Ebrima Colley	25	2	4+19	1	1+1	1
92	FW	(Italy) ITA	Kevin Lasagna	19	2	14+5	2	0	0
99	FW	(Italy) ITA	Lorenzo Bertini	1	0	0	0	1	0
Players transferred out during the season
10	FW	(Italy) ITA	Samuel Di Carmine	12	0	6+5	0	0+1	0
29	FW	(Slovakia) SVK	Ľubomír Tupta	2	0	1+1	0	0	0
33	DF	(Brazil) BRA	Alan Empereur	5	0	4	0	1	0
72	MF	(Italy) ITA	Andrea Danzi	3	0	1+1	0	1	0

Last updated: 23 May 2021
Source: Competitions

=== Goalscorers ===
As of 6 December 2020

Rank	No.	Pos	Nat	Name	Serie A	Coppa Italia	Total
1	7	MF	(Czech Republic)	Antonín Barák	3	0	3
2	20	MF	(Italy)	Mattia Zaccagni	2	0	2
2	11	FW	(Italy)	Andrea Favilli	2	0	2
4	4	MF	(Portugal)	Miguel Veloso	1	0	1
4	8	MF	(Serbia)	Darko Lazović	1	0	1
4	14	MF	(Serbia)	Ivan Ilić	0	1	1
4	26	MF	(England)	Ronaldo Vieira	0	1	1
4	9	FW	(Italy)	Eddie Salcedo	0	1	1
4	90	FW	(The Gambia)	Ebrima Colley	0	1	1
Own goal					1	0	1
Totals					10	4	14
