= 2021–22 Atalanta BC season =

Atalanta BC
2021–22 season
- President: Antonio Percassi
- Head coach: Gian Piero Gasperini
- Stadium: Gewiss Stadium
- Serie A: 8th
- Coppa Italia: Quarter-finals
- UEFA Champions League: Group stage
- UEFA Europa League: Quarter-finals
- Top goalscorer: League: Mario Pašalić (13); All: Luis Muriel; Mario Pašalić (14 each)
Home colours	Away colours	Third colours

The 2021–22 season was the 114th season in the existence of Atalanta BC and the club's 11th consecutive season in the top flight of Italian football. In addition to the domestic league, Atalanta participated in this season's editions of the Coppa Italia, the UEFA Champions League and the UEFA Europa League.

== Players ==
As of 31 January 2022

Note: Flags indicate national team as defined under FIFA eligibility rules; some limited exceptions apply. Players may hold more than one non-FIFA nationality.

No.	Pos.	Nation	Player
1	GK	ARG	Juan Musso
2	DF	ITA	Rafael Tolói (captain)
3	DF	DEN	Joakim Mæhle
6	DF	ARG	José Luis Palomino (4th captain)
7	MF	NED	Teun Koopmeiners
9	FW	COL	Luis Muriel
10	MF	CIV	Jérémie Boga (on loan from Sassuolo)
11	MF	SUI	Remo Freuler (vice-captain)
13	DF	ITA	Giuseppe Pezzella (on loan from Parma)
15	MF	NED	Marten de Roon (3rd captain)
18	MF	UKR	Ruslan Malinovskyi
19	DF	ALB	Berat Djimsiti

No.	Pos.	Nation	Player
20	FW	ROU	Valentin Mihăilă (on loan from Parma)
28	DF	TUR	Merih Demiral (on loan from Juventus)
31	GK	ITA	Francesco Rossi
32	MF	ITA	Matteo Pessina
33	DF	NED	Hans Hateboer
42	DF	ITA	Giorgio Scalvini
57	GK	ITA	Marco Sportiello
59	MF	RUS	Aleksei Miranchuk
72	FW	SLO	Josip Iličić
77	DF	ITA	Davide Zappacosta
88	MF	CRO	Mario Pašalić
91	FW	COL	Duván Zapata

== Transfers ==
=== In ===
No.	Pos.	Player	Transferred from	Fee	Date	Notes	Source
1	GK	(Argentina) Juan Musso	(Italy) Udinese	€20M	2 July 2021		
–	FW	(Italy) Simone Mazzocchi	(Italy) Südtirol		14 July 2021	Exercised buy-back option	
13	DF	(Italy) Giuseppe Pezzella	(Italy) Parma	Loan	27 July 2021	Loan with an option to buy	
66	DF	(Italy) Matteo Lovato	(Italy) Hellas Verona	€8M	31 July 2021	€8M + €3M in bonuses	
17	DF	(Argentina) Cristian Romero	(Italy) Juventus	€16M	6 August 2021		
28	DF	(Turkey) Merih Demiral	(Italy) Juventus	Loan (€3M)	6 August 2021	Loan with an option to buy	
77	DF	(Italy) Davide Zappacosta	(England) Chelsea	€10M	24 August 2021	€10M + add-ons	
7	MF	(Netherlands) Teun Koopmeiners	(Netherlands) AZ	€12M	30 August 2021		
10	MF	(Ivory Coast) Jérémie Boga	(Italy) Sassuolo	Loan	24 January 2022	Loan with an obligation to buy	
20	FW	(Romania) Valentin Mihăilă	(Italy) Parma	Loan	31 January 2022	Loan with an option to buy	

=== Out ===
No.	Pos.	Player	Transferred to	Fee	Date	Notes	Source
–	DF	(Brazil) Roger Ibañez	(Italy) Roma	€8M	4 March 2021	Signed permanently after obligation to buy	
–	FW	(The Gambia) Musa Barrow	(Italy) Bologna	€13M	5 July 2021	Signed permanently after obligation to buy	
44	MF	(Italy) Emmanuel Gyabuaa	(Italy) Perugia	Loan	16 July 2021		
–	FW	(Denmark) Andreas Cornelius	(Italy) Parma	€9M	18 July 2021	Signed permanently after obligation to buy	
–	FW	(Italy) Simone Mazzocchi	(Italy) Ternana	Loan	14 July 2021		
95	GK	(Italy) Pierluigi Gollini	(England) Tottenham Hotspur	Loan	24 July 2021	Loan with an option to buy	
40	DF	(Italy) Matteo Ruggeri	(Italy) Salernitana	Loan	27 July 2021	Loan with an option to buy	
17	DF	(Argentina) Cristian Romero	(England) Tottenham Hotspur	Loan	6 August 2021	Loan with an option to buy	
90	MF	(The Gambia) Ebrima Colley	(Italy) Spezia	Loan	7 August 2021	Loan with an option to buy	
20	MF	(Ukraine) Viktor Kovalenko	(Italy) Spezia	Loan	8 August 2021		
60	MF	(Italy) Jacopo Da Riva	(Italy) SPAL	Loan	24 August 2021		
4	DF	(Croatia) Boško Šutalo	(Italy) Hellas Verona	Loan	25 August 2021		
24	MF	(Italy) Enrico Del Prato	(Italy) Parma	Loan	31 August 2021	Loan with an option to buy	
7	FW	(Netherlands) Sam Lammers	(Germany) Eintracht Frankfurt	Loan	31 August 2021		
66	DF	(Italy) Matteo Lovato	(Italy) Cagliari	Loan	3 January 2022		
99	FW	(Italy) Roberto Piccoli	(Italy) Genoa	Loan	25 January 2022		
8	DF	(Germany) Robin Gosens	(Italy) Internazionale	Loan	27 January 2022	Loan with an obligation to buy	

== Pre-season and friendlies ==
Win Draw Loss Fixtures

16 July 2021 Friendly	Atalanta (Italy)	13–0	(Italy) Albinogandino	Ciserano, Italy
17:00 CEST (UTC+2)	Colley 13', 23', 24', 31'; Iličić 16', 29'; Miranchuk 45' (pen.); Capone 63'; Piccoli 64', 74', 81', 84'; Mallamo 72'	Report		Stadium: Centro Sportivo Bortolotti; Attendance: 0 Referee: Giorgio Bozzetto

18 July 2021 Friendly	Atalanta (Italy)	1–1	(Israel) Maccabi Bnei Raina	Ciserano, Italy
17:00 CEST (UTC+2)	Colley 88'	Report	Amash 29'	Stadium: Centro Sportivo Bortolotti; Attendance: 0 Referee: Daniele Minelli

31 July 2021 Friendly	Atalanta (Italy)	2–1	(Italy) Pordenone	Bergamo, Italy
17:00 CEST (UTC+2)	Piccoli 6'; Kovalenko 75'	Report	Tsadjout 14' (pen.)	Stadium: Gewiss Stadium; Attendance: 1,000; Referee: Matteo Marcenaro

7 August 2021 Betway Cup	West Ham United (England)	2–0	(Italy) Atalanta	London, England
15:00 BST (UTC+1)	Antonio 45'; Fornals 89'	Report	Freuler (yellow card) 38'	Stadium: London Stadium; Referee: Stuart Attwell

11 August 2021 Friendly	Atalanta (Italy)	7–1	(Italy) Alessandria	Bergamo, Italy
17:00 CEST (UTC+2)	Scalvini 13'; Iličić 20', 44'; Pašalić 30'; Muriel 51' (pen.); Gosens 56'; Tolói 82'	Report	Arrighini 43'	Stadium: Gewiss Stadium; Referee: Simone Sozza

14 August 2021 Friendly	Juventus (Italy)	3–1	(Italy) Atalanta	Turin, Italy
20:30 CEST (UTC+2)	Dybala 8'; Bernardeschi 39'; Morata 90+3'	Report	Muriel 18' (pen.); Djimsiti (yellow card) 57'	Stadium: Allianz Stadium; Attendance: 11,500; Referee: Rosario Abisso

== Competitions ==
=== Overview ===
Competition	First match	Last match	Starting round	Final position	Record							
Competition	First match	Last match	Starting round	Final position	Pld	W	D	L	GF	GA	GD	Win %
Serie A	21 August 2021	21 May 2022	Matchday 1	8th	38	16	11	11	65	48	+17	42.11
Coppa Italia	12 January 2022	10 February 2022	Round of 16	Quarter-finals	2	1	0	1	4	3	+1	50.00
Champions League	14 September 2021	9 December 2021	Group stage	Group stage	6	1	3	2	12	13	−1	16.67
Europa League	17 February 2022	14 April 2022	Knockout round play-offs	Quarter-finals	6	4	1	1	10	5	+5	66.67
Total					52	22	15	15	91	69	+22	42.31

Source: Soccerway

=== Serie A ===
==== League table ====
Pos	Team	Pld	W	D	L	GF	GA	GD	Pts	Qualification or relegation
6	Roma	38	18	9	11	59	43	+16	63	Qualification for the Europa League group stage (Note: Since the winners of the 2021–22 Coppa Italia, Inter Milan, qualified for the Champions League, the Europa League berth awarded to the Coppa Italia winners was passed to the sixth-placed team, and the Europa Conference League berth awarded to the sixth-placed team was passed to the seventh-placed team.)
7	Fiorentina	38	19	5	14	59	51	+8	62	Qualification for the Conference League play-off round
8	Atalanta	38	16	11	11	65	48	+17	59	
9	Hellas Verona	38	14	11	13	65	59	+6	53	
10	Torino	38	13	11	14	46	41	+5	50 (Note: Torino finished ahead of Sassuolo on head-to-head points: Sassuolo 0–1 Torino, Torino 1–1 Sassuolo.)	

Source: Serie A
Rules for classification: 1) Points; 2) Head-to-head points; 3) Head-to-head goal difference; 4) Goal difference; 5) Goals scored; 6) Draw. (Note: Head-to-head record is used only after all the matches between the teams in question have been played)

==== Results summary ====
Overall								Home						Away					
Pld	W	D	L	GF	GA	GD	Pts	W	D	L	GF	GA	GD	W	D	L	GF	GA	GD
38	16	11	11	65	48	+17	59	4	8	7	31	29	+2	12	3	4	34	19	+15

Source: Serie A

==== Results by round ====
Round	1	2	3	4	5	6	7	8	9	10	11	12	13	14	15	16	17	18	19	20	21	22	23	24	25	26	27	28	29	30	31	32	33	34	35	36	37	38
Ground	A	H	H	A	H	A	H	A	H	A	H	A	H	A	H	A	A	H	A	H	A	H	A	H	H	A	H	A	H	A	H	A	H	A	H	A	A	H
Result	W	D	L	W	W	D	L	W	D	W	D	W	W	W	W	W	W	L	D	D	W	D	D	L	D	L	W	L	D	W	L	L	L	W	D	W	L	L
Position	7	9	10	7	5	7	8	6	5	5	5	4	4	4	4	4	3	4	4	4	4	4	4	5	5	5	5	6	7	6	7	8	8	8	8	8	8	8

Source: Serie A
A = Away; H = Home; W = Win; D = Draw; L = Loss

==== Matches ====
The league fixtures were announced on 14 July 2021. This is the first season with an asymmetrical calendar, i.e., the order of fixtures in the second half of the season (ritorno) is different from the that of the first half (andata).

21 August 2021 1	Torino	1–2	Atalanta	Turin
20:45 CEST (UTC+2)	Rincón (yellow card) 52'; Bremer (yellow card) 71'; Belotti 79'	Report	Muriel 6'; Demiral (yellow card) 23'; Musso (yellow card) 82'; Piccoli 90+3'	Stadium: Stadio Olimpico Grande Torino; Attendance: 3,475; Referee: Daniele Chiffi

28 August 2021 2	Atalanta	0–0	Bologna	Bergamo
18:30 CEST (UTC+2)	Gosens (yellow card) 36'; Palomino (yellow card) 79'	Report	Medel (yellow card) 35'; Sansone (yellow card) 49'; Arnautović (yellow card) 53'; Hickey (yellow card) 58'; Svanberg (yellow card) 64'	Stadium: Gewiss Stadium; Attendance: 7,912; Referee: Daniele Orsato

11 September 2021 3	Atalanta	1–2	Fiorentina	Bergamo
20:45 CEST (UTC+2)	Mæhle (yellow card) 31'; Zapata (yellow card) 45+2', (goal) 65' (pen.); Gosens (yellow card) 76'; Freuler (yellow card) 86'; Palomino (yellow card) 90+2'	Report	Vlahović 33' (pen.), 49' (pen.); Bonaventura (yellow card) 45+2'; Igor (yellow card) 56'; Milenković (yellow card) 74'; Odriozola (yellow card) 81'	Stadium: Gewiss Stadium; Attendance: 9,162; Referee: Valerio Marini

18 September 2021 4	Salernitana	0–1	Atalanta	Salerno
20:45 CEST (UTC+2)	Đurić (yellow card) 45'; Ranieri (yellow card) 60'; Obi (yellow card) 73'; Jaroszyński (yellow card) 86'	Report	Mæhle (yellow card) 16'; Tolói (yellow card) 38'; Demiral (yellow card) 45'; Malinovskyi (yellow card) 56'; Zapata 75'	Stadium: Stadio Arechi; Attendance: 11,949; Referee: Paolo Valeri

21 September 2021 5	Atalanta	2–1	Sassuolo	Bergamo
20:45 CEST (UTC+2)	Gosens 3'; Zappacosta 37'; Malinovskyi (yellow card) 61'; Pezzella (yellow card) 74'	Report	Ferrari (yellow card) 25'; Berardi 44'; Lopez (yellow card) 90+1'	Stadium: Gewiss Stadium; Attendance: 7,353; Referee: Davide Massa

25 September 2021 6	Internazionale	2–2	Atalanta	Milan
18:00 CEST (UTC+2)	Martínez 5'; Bastoni (yellow card) 12'; Çalhanoğlu (yellow card) 43'; Barella (yellow card) 70'; Džeko 71'; Dimarco (penalty missed) 85'	Report	Malinovskyi (yellow card) 4', (goal) 30'; Palomino (yellow card) 19'; Zapata (yellow card) 21'; Tolói 38', (yellow card) 90'; Zappacosta (yellow card) 64'	Stadium: San Siro; Attendance: 36,517; Referee: Fabio Maresca

3 October 2021 7	Atalanta	2–3	Milan	Bergamo
20:45 CEST (UTC+2)	De Roon (yellow card) 40'; Zapata 86' (pen.); Pašalić 90+4'	Report	Calabria 1'; Brahim (yellow card) 42'; Tonali 43'; Tomori (yellow card) 52'; Leão 78', (yellow card) 88'; Messias (yellow card) 85'	Stadium: Gewiss Stadium; Attendance: 9,363; Referee: Marco Di Bello

17 October 2021 8	Empoli	1–4	Atalanta	Empoli
15:00 CEST (UTC+2)	Di Francesco 30'; Marchizza (yellow card) 37'; Štulac (yellow card) 46'; Bandinelli (yellow card) 67'	Report	Iličić 11', 26', (penalty missed) 67'; Viti 49' (o.g.); Freuler (yellow card) 69'; Palomino (yellow card) 80'; Zapata 89'	Stadium: Stadio Carlo Castellani; Attendance: 6,214; Referee: Marco Serra

24 October 2021 9	Atalanta	1–1	Udinese	Bergamo
12:30 CEST (UTC+2)	Malinovskyi 56'; Lovato (yellow card) 76'; Pezzella (yellow card) 78'	Report	Samir (yellow card) 17'; Pussetto (yellow card) 58'; Beto 90+4'	Stadium: Gewiss Stadium; Attendance: 9,951; Referee: Livio Marinelli

27 October 2021 10	Sampdoria	1–3	Atalanta	Genoa
18:30 CEST (UTC+2)	Caputo 10'; Thorsby (yellow card) 26'; Askildsen (yellow card) 29'; Colley (yellow card) 36'; Chabot (yellow card) 90+1'	Report	Palomino (yellow card) 14'; Askildsen 17' (o.g.); Zapata 21'; Iličić (yellow card) 64', (goal) 90+5'; Freuler (yellow card) 90+3'	Stadium: Stadio Luigi Ferraris; Attendance: 5,462; Referee: Alessandro Prontera

30 October 2021 11	Atalanta	2–2	Lazio	Bergamo
15:00 CEST (UTC+2)	Zapata 45+1'; Demiral (yellow card) 78'; De Roon 90+4'	Report	Pedro 18'; Luiz Felipe (yellow card) 34'; Immobile 74'; Reina (yellow card) 90+2'; Lucas (yellow card) 90+3'	Stadium: Gewiss Stadium; Attendance: 11,981; Referee: Marco Guida

6 November 2021 12	Cagliari	1–2	Atalanta	Cagliari
20:45 CET (UTC+1)	Godín (yellow card) 20'; João Pedro 27'	Report	Pašalić 6'; Zapata 43'; Koopmeiners (yellow card) 45'	Stadium: Sardegna Arena; Attendance: 6,976; Referee: Marco Piccinini

20 November 2021 13	Atalanta	5–2	Spezia	Bergamo
15:00 CET (UTC+1)	Koopmeiners (yellow card) 10'; Pašalić 18', 41', (yellow card) 71'; Zapata 38' (pen.); Muriel 83'; Malinovskyi 89'	Report	Gyasi (yellow card) 5'; Nzola 11', 90+1'; Sala (yellow card) 36'; Hristov (yellow card) 49'	Stadium: Gewiss Stadium; Attendance: 10,744; Referee: Rosario Abisso

27 November 2021 14	Juventus	0–1	Atalanta	Turin
18:00 CET (UTC+1)	Cuadrado (yellow card) 50'; Rabiot (yellow card) 66'; Bernardeschi (yellow card) 79'; Locatelli (yellow card) 88'	Report	Zapata 28'; Freuler (yellow card) 32'; Malinovskyi (yellow card) 37'; Zappacosta (yellow card) 43'; Demiral (yellow card) 70'; Djimsiti (yellow card) 85'	Stadium: Juventus Stadium; Attendance: 29,886; Referee: Giovanni Ayroldi

30 November 2021 15	Atalanta	4–0	Venezia	Bergamo
18:30 CET (UTC+1)	Pašalić 7', 12', 67'; Koopmeiners 57'	Report	Ampadu (yellow card) 81'	Stadium: Gewiss Stadium; Attendance: 8,667; Referee: Alberto Santoro

4 December 2021 16	Napoli	2–3	Atalanta	Naples
20:45 CET (UTC+1)	Zieliński 40'; Mertens 47'; Rrahmani (yellow card) 58'; Malcuit (yellow card) 64'	Report	Malinovskyi 7', (yellow card) 17'; Demiral 66'; Freuler 71'; Pašalić (yellow card) 82'; Djimsiti (yellow card) 87'	Stadium: Stadio Diego Armando Maradona; Attendance: 30,000; Referee: Maurizio Mariani

12 December 2021 17	Hellas Verona	1–2	Atalanta	Verona
15:00 CET (UTC+1)	Simeone 22'; Ceccherini (yellow card) 42'; Caprari (yellow card) 90+2'	Report	Miranchuk 37'; Koopmeiners 62'; Zapata (yellow card) 86'	Stadium: Stadio Marcantonio Bentegodi; Attendance: 14,788; Referee: Juan Luca Sacchi

18 December 2021 18	Atalanta	1–4	Roma	Bergamo
15:00 CET (UTC+1)	De Roon (yellow card) 8'; Cristante 45+1' (o.g.)	Report	Abraham 1', 82'; Zaniolo (yellow card) 9', (goal) 27'; Ibañez 50'; Smalling 72'; Mancini (yellow card) 74'	Stadium: Gewiss Stadium; Attendance: 14,469; Referee: Massimiliano Irrati

21 December 2021 19	Genoa	0–0	Atalanta	Genoa
20:45 CET (UTC+1)	Sturaro (yellow card) 19'; Badelj (yellow card) 41'	Report	Freuler (yellow card) 23'	Stadium: Stadio Luigi Ferraris; Attendance: 6,000; Referee: Paolo Valeri

9 January 2022 21	Udinese	2–6	Atalanta	Udine
16:30 CET (UTC+1)	Becão (yellow card) 30'; Deulofeu (yellow card) 44'; Djimsiti 59' (o.g.); Beto 88'	Report	Pašalić 17'; Muriel 22', 76'; Malinovskyi 43'; De Roon (yellow card) 45'; Djimsiti (yellow card) 77'; Mæhle 89'; Pessina 90+2'	Stadium: Stadio Friuli; Attendance: 8,679; Referee: Michael Fabbri

16 January 2022 22	Atalanta	0–0	Internazionale	Bergamo
20:45 CET (UTC+1)	De Roon (yellow card) 37'; Palomino (yellow card) 85'	Report	Brozović (yellow card) 42'; Çalhanoğlu (yellow card) 62'	Stadium: Gewiss Stadium; Attendance: 5,000; Referee: Davide Massa

22 January 2022 23	Lazio	0–0	Atalanta	Rome
20:45 CET (UTC+1)		Report	Pezzella (yellow card) 33'; Zappacosta (yellow card) 39'; Tolói (yellow card) 85'	Stadium: Stadio Olimpico; Attendance: 4,000; Referee: Simone Sozza

6 February 2022 24	Atalanta	1–2	Cagliari	Bergamo
12:30 CET (UTC+1)	Musso (red card) 52'; Zappacosta (yellow card) 61'; Palomino 64'	Report	Dalbert (yellow card) 24'; Grassi (yellow card) 35'; Pereiro 50', 68'; Deiola (yellow card) 63'; Cragno (yellow card) 90'; Goldaniga (yellow card) 90+1'	Stadium: Gewiss Stadium; Attendance: 7,868; Referee: Alessandro Prontera

13 February 2022 25	Atalanta	1–1	Juventus	Bergamo
20:45 CET (UTC+1)	Djimsiti (yellow card) 35'; Hateboer (yellow card) 36'; Malinovskyi 76'	Report	Danilo (yellow card) 38', (goal) 90+2'; Vlahović (yellow card) 42'; De Ligt (yellow card) 75'	Stadium: Gewiss Stadium; Attendance: 9,731; Referee: Maurizio Mariani

20 February 2022 26	Fiorentina	1–0	Atalanta	Florence
12:30 CET (UTC+1)	Milenković (yellow card) 15'; Piątek 56'; Amrabat (yellow card) 73'	Report	Djimsiti (yellow card) 13'; Malinovskyi (yellow card) 45+1'; Demiral (yellow card) 45+2'; Tolói (yellow card) 74'; Sportiello (yellow card) 90+6'	Stadium: Stadio Artemio Franchi; Attendance: 18,056; Referee: Daniele Doveri

28 February 2022 27	Atalanta	4–0	Sampdoria	Bergamo
20:50 CET (UTC+1)	Pašalić 6'; Koopmeiners 29', 61'; Tolói (yellow card) 77'; Miranchuk 86'	Report	Ekdal (yellow card) 48'; Thorsby (yellow card) 66'	Stadium: Gewiss Stadium; Attendance: 10,245; Referee: Simone Sozza

5 March 2022 28	Roma	1–0	Atalanta	Rome
18:00 CET (UTC+1)	Cristante (yellow card) 9'; Abraham (yellow card) 20', (goal) 32'; Mkhitaryan (yellow card) 66' (yellow-red card) 90+6'; Kumbulla (yellow card) 69'; Ibañez (yellow card) 85'	Report	Malinovskyi (yellow card) 78'; Demiral (yellow card) 86'; De Roon (yellow card) 90+4' (yellow-red card) 90+4'	Stadium: Stadio Olimpico; Attendance: 42,303; Referee: Davide Massa

13 March 2022 29	Atalanta	0–0	Genoa	Bergamo
18:00 CET (UTC+1)	Zappacosta (yellow card) 38'; Tolói (yellow card) 82'	Report		Stadium: Gewiss Stadium; Attendance: 9,140; Referee: Rosario Abisso

20 March 2022 30	Bologna	0–1	Atalanta	Bologna
20:45 CET (UTC+1)		Report	Demiral (yellow card) 66'; Cissé 82'	Stadium: Stadio Renato Dall'Ara; Attendance: 13,323; Referee: Fabio Maresca

3 April 2022 31	Atalanta	1–3	Napoli	Bergamo
15:00 CEST (UTC+2)	Palomino (yellow card) 35'; De Roon 58', (yellow card) 86'	Report	Insigne 14' (pen.); Politano 37'; Juan Jesus (yellow card) 67'; Ospina (yellow card) 76'; Elmas 81'; Zambo Anguissa (yellow card) 85'	Stadium: Gewiss Stadium; Attendance: 17,709; Referee: Marco Di Bello

10 April 2022 32	Sassuolo	2–1	Atalanta	Reggio Emilia
15:00 CEST (UTC+2)	Traorè 24', 61'; Matheus Henrique (yellow card) 39'; Müldür (yellow card) 63'	Report	Zappacosta (yellow card) 90+2'; Muriel 90+3'	Stadium: Mapei Stadium – Città del Tricolore; Attendance: 7,842; Referee: Juan Luca Sacchi

18 April 2022 33	Atalanta	1–2	Hellas Verona	Bergamo
21:00 CEST (UTC+2)	Palomino (yellow card) 25'; Malinovskyi (yellow card) 30'; Koopmeiners (yellow card) 58'; Scalvini 82'	Report	Günter (yellow card) 9'; Casale (yellow card) 21'; Ceccherini 45+2', (yellow card) 67'; Koopmeiners 55' (o.g.)	Stadium: Gewiss Stadium; Attendance: 14,537; Referee: Marco Piccinini

23 April 2022 34	Venezia	1–3	Atalanta	Venice
15:00 CEST (UTC+2)	Črnigoj 80'	Report	Pašalić 44'; Zapata 47', (yellow card) 57'; Scalvini (yellow card) 49'; Muriel 63'; Djimsiti (yellow card) 71'	Stadium: Stadio Pier Luigi Penzo; Attendance: 6,132; Referee: Francesco Fourneau

27 April 2022 20	Atalanta	4–4	Torino	Bergamo
20:15 CEST (UTC+2)	Muriel 18' (pen.), 83' (pen.); De Roon 23'; Freuler (yellow card) 35'; Pašalić (yellow card) 69', (goal) 78'	Report	Sanabria 4'; Lukić 36' (pen.), 63' (pen.), (yellow card) 52'; Freuler 68' (o.g.); Zima (yellow card) 83'	Stadium: Gewiss Stadium; Attendance: 10,014; Referee: Rosario Abisso
Note: The match was originally scheduled for 6 January 2022, but was postponed to 27 April 2022 due to COVID-19 outbreaks within the squads.

2 May 2022 35	Atalanta	1–1	Salernitana	Bergamo
20:45 CEST (UTC+2)	Demiral (yellow card) 37'; Palomino (yellow card) 38'; Pašalić 88'; Freuler (yellow card) 90'	Report	Éderson 27'; Đurić (yellow card) 38'; Verdi (yellow card) 55'	Stadium: Gewiss Stadium; Attendance: 17,011; Referee: Marco Guida

8 May 2022 36	Spezia	1–3	Atalanta	La Spezia
12:30 CEST (UTC+2)	Verde 30'; Bastoni (yellow card) 41'; Maggiore (yellow card) 44'	Report	Muriel 16', (yellow card) 62'; Malinovskyi (yellow card) 53'; Freuler (yellow card) 57'; Djimsiti 73'; Pašalić 87'	Stadium: Stadio Alberto Picco; Attendance: 9,231; Referee: Fabio Maresca

15 May 2022 37	Milan	2–0	Atalanta	Milan
18:00 CEST (UTC+2)	Giroud (yellow card) 44'; Leão 56'; Kessié (yellow card) 67'; Hernandez 75'; Bennacer (yellow card) 90+2'	Report	Koopmeiners (yellow card) 53'; Malinovskyi (yellow card) 87'	Stadium: San Siro; Attendance: 73,304; Referee: Daniele Orsato

21 May 2022 38	Atalanta	0–1	Empoli	Bergamo
20:45 CEST (UTC+2)	Freuler (yellow card) 58'	Report	Stojanović (yellow card) 45'; Štulac 79'	Stadium: Gewiss Stadium; Attendance: 17,654; Referee: Rosario Abisso

=== Coppa Italia ===
12 January 2022 Round of 16	Atalanta	2–0	Venezia	Bergamo
17:30 CET (UTC+1)	Muriel 12'; Koopmeiners (yellow card) 29'; Mæhle 88'	Report	Fiordilino (yellow card) 42'; Schnegg (yellow card) 54'; Ampadu (yellow card) 77'; Johnsen (yellow card) 90+3'	Stadium: Gewiss Stadium; Attendance: 2,757; Referee: Ivano Pezzuto

10 February 2022 Quarter-finals	Atalanta	2–3	Fiorentina	Bergamo
18:00 CET (UTC+1)	De Roon (yellow card) 7'; Zappacosta 30'; Pašalić (yellow card) 32'; Boga 56'	Report	Piątek 9' (pen.), 71', (penalty missed) 71'; Igor (yellow card) 38'; Martínez Quarta (yellow card) 45+1' (yellow-red card) 79'; Milenković 90+3'	Stadium: Gewiss Stadium; Attendance: 7,425; Referee: Michael Fabbri

=== UEFA Champions League ===
==== Group stage ====
The draw for the group stage was held on 26 August 2021.

Pos	Team	Pld	W	D	L	GF	GA	GD	Pts	Qualification	MUN	VIL	ATA	YB
1	(England) Manchester United	6	3	2	1	11	8	+3	11	Advance to knockout phase	—	2–1	3–2	1–1
2	(Spain) Villarreal	6	3	1	2	12	9	+3	10	Advance to knockout phase	0–2	—	2–2	2–0
3	(Italy) Atalanta	6	1	3	2	12	13	−1	6	Transfer to Europa League	2–2	2–3	—	1–0
4	(Switzerland) Young Boys	6	1	2	3	7	12	−5	5		2–1	1–4	3–3	—

Source: UEFA
Rules for classification: Group stage tiebreakers

14 September 2021 1	Villarreal (Spain)	2–2	(Italy) Atalanta	Villarreal, Spain
21:00 CEST (UTC+2)	Trigueros 39'; Capoue (yellow card) 55'; Gerard (yellow card) 65'; Pino (yellow card) 71'; Danjuma 73'; Coquelin (yellow card) 76' (yellow-red card) 84'	Report	Freuler 6'; De Roon (yellow card) 24'; Gosens 83'	Stadium: Estadio de la Cerámica; Attendance: 12,916; Referee: Clément Turpin (France)

29 September 2021 2	Atalanta (Italy)	1–0	(Switzerland) Young Boys	Bergamo, Italy
18:45 CET (UTC+1)	Pessina 68'; Zappacosta (yellow card) 89'	Report	Sierro (yellow card) 65'	Stadium: Stadio Atleti Azzurri d'Italia; Attendance: 8,536; Referee: Felix Brych (Germany)

20 October 2021 3	Manchester United (England)	3–2	(Italy) Atalanta	Manchester, England
21:00 CET (UTC+1)	Rashford 53'; Shaw (yellow card) 64'; Maguire 75'; Ronaldo 81'; Matić (yellow card) 90+3'; Cavani (yellow card) 90+5'	Report	Pašalić 15', (yellow card) 57'; Demiral 29'; Lovato (yellow card) 55'; De Roon (yellow card) 57'; Palomino (yellow card) 80'	Stadium: Old Trafford; Attendance: 72,279; Referee: Szymon Marciniak (Poland)

2 November 2021 4	Atalanta (Italy)	2–2	(England) Manchester United	Bergamo, Italy
21:00 CET (UTC+1)	Iličić 12'; Zapata 56'	Report	Ronaldo 45+1', 90+1'; McTominay (yellow card) 51'	Stadium: Stadio Atleti Azzurri d'Italia; Attendance: 14,443; Referee: Slavko Vinčić (Slovenia)

23 November 2021 5	Young Boys (Switzerland)	3–3	(Italy) Atalanta	Bern, Switzerland
21:00 CET (UTC+1)	Garcia (yellow card) 22'; Pefok 39'; Ngamaleu (yellow card) 44'; Hefti (yellow card) 66', (goal) 84'; Sierro 80'	Report	Zapata 10', (yellow card) 90+2'; Palomino 51'; Demiral (yellow card) 63'; Muriel 88'	Stadium: Wankdorf Stadium; Attendance: 31,120; Referee: Daniel Siebert (Germany)

9 December 2021 6	Atalanta (Italy)	2–3	(Spain) Villarreal	Bergamo, Italy
19:00 CET (UTC+1)	Malinovskyi 71'; Zapata 80'; Muriel (yellow card) 89'	Report	Danjuma 3', 51'; Capoue 42'; Parejo (yellow card) 57'; Moreno (yellow card) 57'	Stadium: Stadio Atleti Azzurri d'Italia; Attendance: 11,690; Referee: Anthony Taylor (England)
Note: The match was originally scheduled for 8 December 2021 at 21:00 CET, but was postponed to the following day at 19:00 CET due to adverse weather conditions.

=== UEFA Europa League ===
==== Knockout phase ====
===== Knockout round play-offs =====
The draw for the knockout round play-offs was held on 13 December 2021.

17 February 2022 First leg	Atalanta (Italy)	2–1	(Greece) Olympiacos	Bergamo, Italy
21:00 CET (UTC+1)	Pašalić (yellow card) 33'; Djimsiti 61', 63'; Demiral (yellow card) 78'; Pezzella (yellow card) 90+2'	Report	Soares 16'; Papastathopoulos (yellow card) 53'	Stadium: Stadio Atleti Azzurri d'Italia; Attendance: 9,448; Referee: Sandro Schärer (Switzerland)

24 February 2022 Second leg	Olympiacos (Greece)	0–3 (1–5 agg.)	(Italy) Atalanta	Piraeus, Greece
18:45 CET (UTC+1)	Cissé (yellow card) 4'; M'Vila (yellow card) 56'; Camara (yellow card) 85'	Report	Mæhle 40'; Tolói (yellow card) 54'; Malinovskyi 67', 69'	Stadium: Karaiskakis Stadium; Attendance: 15,835; Referee: Carlos del Cerro Grande (Spain)

===== Round of 16 =====
The draw for the round of 16 was held on 25 February 2022.

10 March 2022 First leg	Atalanta (Italy)	3–2	(Germany) Bayer Leverkusen	Bergamo, Italy
21:00 CET (UTC+1)	Malinovskyi 23'; Muriel 25', 49'; Tolói (yellow card) 64'	Report	Aránguiz 11'; Diaby 63'; Bakker (yellow card) 73'; Wirtz (yellow card) 78'	Stadium: Stadio Atleti Azzurri d'Italia; Attendance: 13,134; Referee: Srđan Jovanović (Serbia)

17 March 2022 Second leg	Bayer Leverkusen (Germany)	0–1 (2–4 agg.)	(Italy) Atalanta	Leverkusen, Germany
18:45 CET (UTC+1)	Fosu-Mensah (yellow card) 56'; Diaby (yellow card) 90'; Andrich (yellow card) 90'	Report	Boga 90+1'	Stadium: BayArena; Attendance: 19,871; Referee: François Letexier (France)

===== Quarter-finals =====
The draw for the quarter-finals was held on 18 March 2022.

7 April 2022 First leg	RB Leipzig (Germany)	1–1	(Italy) Atalanta	Leipzig, Germany
18:45 CEST (UTC+2)	Gvardiol (yellow card) 51'; Silva (penalty missed) 58'; Zappacosta 58' (o.g.); Halstenberg (yellow card) 85'	Report	Palomino (yellow card) 3'; Muriel 17'	Stadium: Red Bull Arena; Attendance: 36,029; Referee: Michael Oliver (England)

14 April 2022 Second leg	Atalanta (Italy)	0–2 (1–3 agg.)	(Germany) RB Leipzig	Bergamo, Italy
18:45 CEST (UTC+2)	Zapata (yellow card) 58'; Freuler (yellow card) 59'; Demiral (yellow card) 60'; Koopmeiners (yellow card) 75'; Hateboer (yellow card) 90+2'; Zappacosta (yellow card) 90+5'	Report	Nkunku 18', 87' (pen.); Henrichs (yellow card) 49'; Orbán (yellow card) 62'; Simakan (yellow card) 90+5'; Kampl (yellow card) 90+6'	Stadium: Stadio Atleti Azzurri d'Italia; Attendance: 17,905; Referee: Antonio Mateu Lahoz (Spain)

== Statistics ==
=== Appearances and goals ===
No.	Pos	Nat	Player	Total		Serie A		Coppa Italia		Champions League		Europa League	
No.	Pos	Nat	Player	Apps	Goals	Apps	Goals	Apps	Goals	Apps	Goals	Apps	Goals
Goalkeepers
1	GK	(Argentina) ARG	Juan Musso	47	0	33	0	2	0	6	0	6	0
31	GK	(Italy) ITA	Francesco Rossi	1	0	0+1	0	0	0	0	0	0	0
47	GK	(Italy) ITA	Tommaso Bertini (Note: Aggregated to the first team from the Primavera (youth) team)	0	0	0	0	0	0	0	0	0	0
57	GK	(Italy) ITA	Marco Sportiello	5	0	5	0	0	0	0	0	0	0
Defenders
2	DF	(Italy) ITA	Rafael Tolói	28	1	16+4	1	0	0	4	0	4	0
3	DF	(Denmark) DEN	Joakim Mæhle	35	3	15+11	1	0+1	1	4+1	0	2+1	1
6	DF	(Argentina) ARG	José Luis Palomino	45	2	30+4	1	2	0	5	1	3+1	0
13	DF	(Italy) ITA	Giuseppe Pezzella	29	0	10+11	0	1	0	0+3	0	1+3	0
19	DF	(Albania) ALB	Berat Djimsiti	41	3	25+6	1	1	0	2+3	0	3+1	2
28	DF	(Turkey) TUR	Merih Demiral	42	2	22+6	1	2	0	5+1	1	6	0
33	DF	(Netherlands) NED	Hans Hateboer	30	0	16+5	0	2	0	1	0	5+1	0
42	DF	(Italy) ITA	Giorgio Scalvini	21	1	9+9	1	1	0	0	0	0+2	0
46	DF	(Italy) ITA	Giorgio Cittadini	3	0	0+2	0	0	0	0	0	0+1	0
77	DF	(Italy) ITA	Davide Zappacosta	45	2	29+5	1	1	1	5+1	0	4	0
Midfielders
7	MF	(Netherlands) NED	Teun Koopmeiners	43	4	23+7	4	1+1	0	2+3	0	4+2	0
11	MF	(Switzerland) SUI	Remo Freuler	43	2	28+1	1	2	0	6	1	5+1	0
15	MF	(Netherlands) NED	Marten de Roon	44	3	28+2	3	1+1	0	6	0	6	0
18	MF	(Ukraine) UKR	Ruslan Malinovskyi	41	10	19+11	6	1	0	3+2	1	5	3
32	MF	(Italy) ITA	Matteo Pessina	37	2	18+9	1	1+1	0	3+1	1	3+1	0
44	MF	(Italy) ITA	Andrea Oliveri	0	0	0	0	0	0	0	0	0	0
45	MF	(Italy) ITA	Federico Zuccon	0	0	0	0	0	0	0	0	0	0
48	MF	(Italy) ITA	Simone Panada	0	0	0	0	0	0	0	0	0	0
49	MF	(Italy) ITA	Samuel Giovane	0	0	0	0	0	0	0	0	0	0
51	MF	(Ivory Coast) CIV	Alassane Sidibe	1	0	0+1	0	0	0	0	0	0	0
59	MF	(Russia) RUS	Aleksei Miranchuk	25	2	7+12	2	1	0	0+2	0	0+3	0
88	MF	(Croatia) CRO	Mario Pašalić	48	14	24+13	13	1+1	0	3+2	1	3+1	0
Forwards
9	FW	(Colombia) COL	Luis Muriel	39	14	17+10	9	1+1	1	1+4	1	4+1	3
10	FW	(Ivory Coast) CIV	Jérémie Boga	22	2	7+8	0	1	1	0	0	1+5	1
20	FW	(Romania) ROU	Valentin Mihăilă	7	0	0+5	0	0	0	0	0	0+2	0
50	FW	(Italy) ITA	Tommaso De Nipoti	1	0	0+1	0	0	0	0	0	0	0
72	FW	(Slovenia) SLO	Josip Iličić	24	4	8+12	3	0	0	3+1	1	0	0
91	FW	(Colombia) COL	Duván Zapata	32	13	20+4	10	0	0	5+1	3	1+1	0
99	FW	(Guinea) GUI	Moustapha Cissé	9	4	0+3	1	0	0	5+1	3	0	0
Players transferred out during the season
7	FW	(Netherlands) NED	Sam Lammers	2	0	0+2	0	0	0	0	0	0	0
8	DF	(Germany) GER	Robin Gosens	8	2	5+1	1	0	0	2	1	0	0
66	DF	(Italy) ITA	Matteo Lovato	7	0	3+3	0	0	0	0+1	0	0	0
99	FW	(Italy) ITA	Roberto Piccoli	12	1	1+11	1	0	0	0	0	0	0

Last updated: 21 May 2022
Source: Competitions

=== Goalscorers ===
As of 21 May 2022

Rank	No.	Pos	Nat	Name	Serie A	Coppa Italia	Champions League	Europa League	Total
1	9	FW	(Colombia)	Luis Muriel	9	1	1	3	14
1	88	MF	(Croatia)	Mario Pašalić	13	0	1	0	14
3	91	FW	(Colombia)	Duván Zapata	10	0	3	0	13
4	18	MF	(Ukraine)	Ruslan Malinovskyi	6	0	1	3	10
5	7	MF	(Netherlands)	Teun Koopmeiners	4	0	0	0	4
5	72	FW	(Slovenia)	Josip Iličić	3	0	1	0	4
7	3	DF	(Denmark)	Joakim Mæhle	1	1	0	1	3
7	15	MF	(Netherlands)	Marten de Roon	3	0	0	0	3
7	19	DF	(Albania)	Berat Djimsiti	1	0	0	2	3
10	6	DF	(Argentina)	José Luis Palomino	1	0	1	0	2
10	8	DF	(Germany)	Robin Gosens	1	0	1	0	2
10	10	MF	(Ivory Coast)	Jérémie Boga	0	1	0	1	2
10	11	MF	(Switzerland)	Remo Freuler	1	0	1	0	2
10	28	DF	(Turkey)	Merih Demiral	1	0	1	0	2
10	32	MF	(Italy)	Matteo Pessina	1	0	1	0	2
10	59	MF	(Russia)	Aleksei Miranchuk	2	0	0	0	2
10	77	DF	(Italy)	Davide Zappacosta	1	1	0	0	2
18	2	DF	(Italy)	Rafael Tolói	1	0	0	0	1
18	42	DF	(Italy)	Giorgio Scalvini	1	0	0	0	1
18	99	FW	(Italy)	Roberto Piccoli	1	0	0	0	1
18	99	FW	(Guinea)	Moustapha Cissé	1	0	0	0	1
Own goal					3	0	0	0	3
Totals					65	4	12	10	91
