= Lorenzo Bertini =

Lorenzo Bertini may refer to:

- Lorenzo Bertini (rower) (born 1976), Italian rower
- Lorenzo Bertini (footballer) (born 2001), Italian footballer
