= Matteo Lovato =

Italian footballer (born 2000)

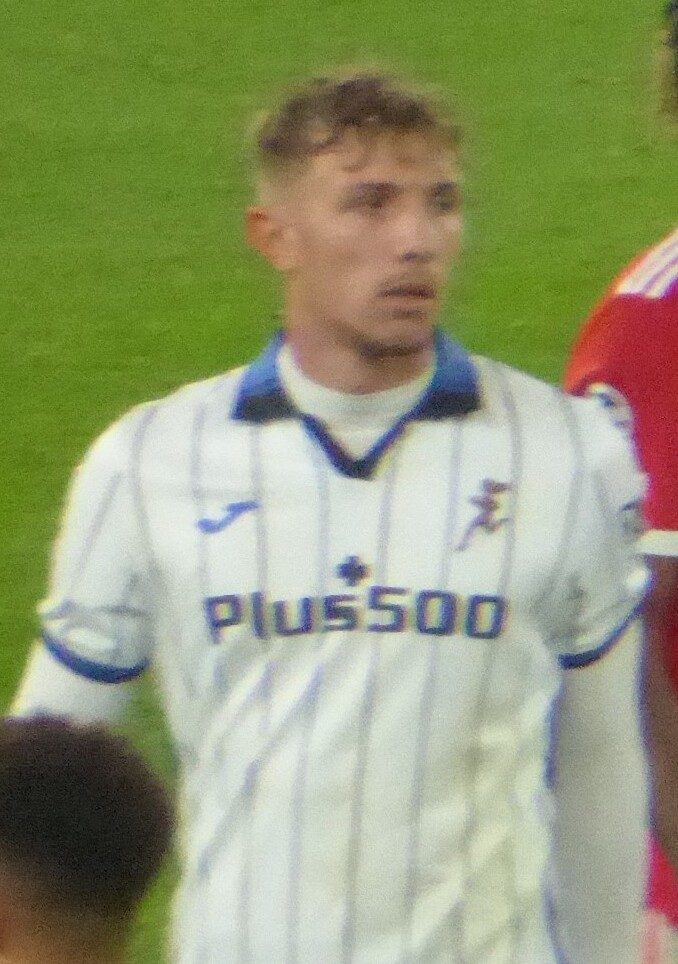
- Lovato playing for Atalanta in 2021

Personal information
- Date of birth: 14 February 2000 (age 26)
- Place of birth: Monselice, Italy
- Height: 1.88 m (6 ft 2 in)
- Position: Centre-back

Team information
- Current team: Padova

Youth career
- –2016: Padova
- 2016–2019: Genoa
- 2018–2019: → Padova (loan)

Senior career*
Years	Team	Apps	(Gls)
2019–2020	Padova	17	(0)
2020–2021	Hellas Verona	25	(0)
2021–2022	Atalanta	6	(0)
2022	→ Cagliari (loan)	16	(0)
2022–2026	Salernitana	30	(0)
2024	→ Torino (loan)	13	(0)
2024–2025	→ Sassuolo (loan)	20	(1)
2025–2026	→ Empoli (loan)	33	(3)
2026–	Padova	0	(0)

International career^{‡}
2020–2023	Italy U21	15	(1)
- * Club domestic league appearances and goals as of 13 May 2026 ‡ National team caps and goals as of 28 June 2023

Matteo Lovato (born 14 February 2000) is an Italian professional footballer who plays as a centre-back for Serie B club Padova.

== Club career ==
=== Early years ===
Lovato spent his early years in the youth teams of Padova before moving to Genoa's under-17 team at age 16, where he made 18 appearances and scored two goals. Lovato did not join Genoa's Primavera team, though; he returned to Padova on loan in January 2018.

On 25 August 2019, Lovato made his Serie C debut with Padova under coach Salvatore Sullo, as a starter in a 3–1 away victory against Virtus Verona. He would remain with the club for the first half of the 2019–20 season, accumulating 18 appearances in all competitions.

=== Hellas Verona ===
On 31 January 2020, Hellas Verona announced the acquisition of Lovato for a reported fee of €500,000. He made his Serie A debut with the club on 18 July 2020 under coach Ivan Jurić as a late substitute for Koray Günter in a 1–1 home draw against Atalanta.

The next season, Lovato broke into the starting lineup following the sale of Marash Kumbulla. He made a total of 24 appearances for Verona, helping the club to a 10th-place finish.

=== Atalanta ===
On 31 July 2021, Lovato signed for Atalanta on a four-year contract, for a reported fee of €8 million plus €3 million in bonuses.

On 3 January 2022, Lovato joined Cagliari on loan until the end of the 2021–22 season.

=== Salernitana ===
Lovato joined Salernitana on 6 July 2022 on a five-year contract, as part of a deal in which Éderson moved the other way.

On 31 January 2024, Lovato moved on loan to Torino, with an option to buy.

On 7 August 2024, Lovato joined Sassuolo on loan, with an option to buy and a conditional obligation to buy.

On 18 August 2025, Lovato was loaned to Empoli, with a conditional obligation to buy.

=== Return to Padova ===
On 22 July 2026, Lovato returned to Padova with a three-year contract.

== International career ==
On 12 November 2020, Lovato made his debut with the Italy U21 playing as a starter in a qualifying match won 2–1 against Iceland in Reykjavík.

== Career statistics ==
=== Club ===
As of match played 20 February 2026

Appearances and goals by club, season and competition
Club	Season	League			Cup		Europe		Other		Total	
Club	Season	Division	Apps	Goals	Apps	Goals	Apps	Goals	Apps	Goals	Apps	Goals
Padova	2019–20	Serie C	17	0	1	0	—		—		18	0
Hellas Verona	2019–20	Serie A	1	0	0	0	—		—		1	0
Hellas Verona	2020–21	Serie A	24	0	0	0	—		—		24	0
Hellas Verona	Total		25	0	0	0	—		—		25	0
Atalanta	2021–22	Serie A	6	0	—		1	0	—		7	0
Cagliari (loan)	2021–22	Serie A	16	0	0	0	—		—		16	0
Salernitana	2022–23	Serie A	17	0	0	0	—		—		17	0
Salernitana	2023–24	Serie A	13	0	2	0	—		—		15	0
Salernitana	Total		30	0	2	0	—		—		32	0
Torino (loan)	2023–24	Serie A	13	0	—		—		—		13	0
Sassuolo (loan)	2024–25	Serie B	20	1	1	0	—		—		21	1
Empoli (loan)	2025–26	Serie B	22	1	0	0	—		—		22	1
Career total			149	2	4	0	1	0	0	0	154	2

== Honours ==
Sassuolo

- Serie B: 2024–25
