= Nikola Kalinić (footballer) =

Croatian footballer (born 1988)

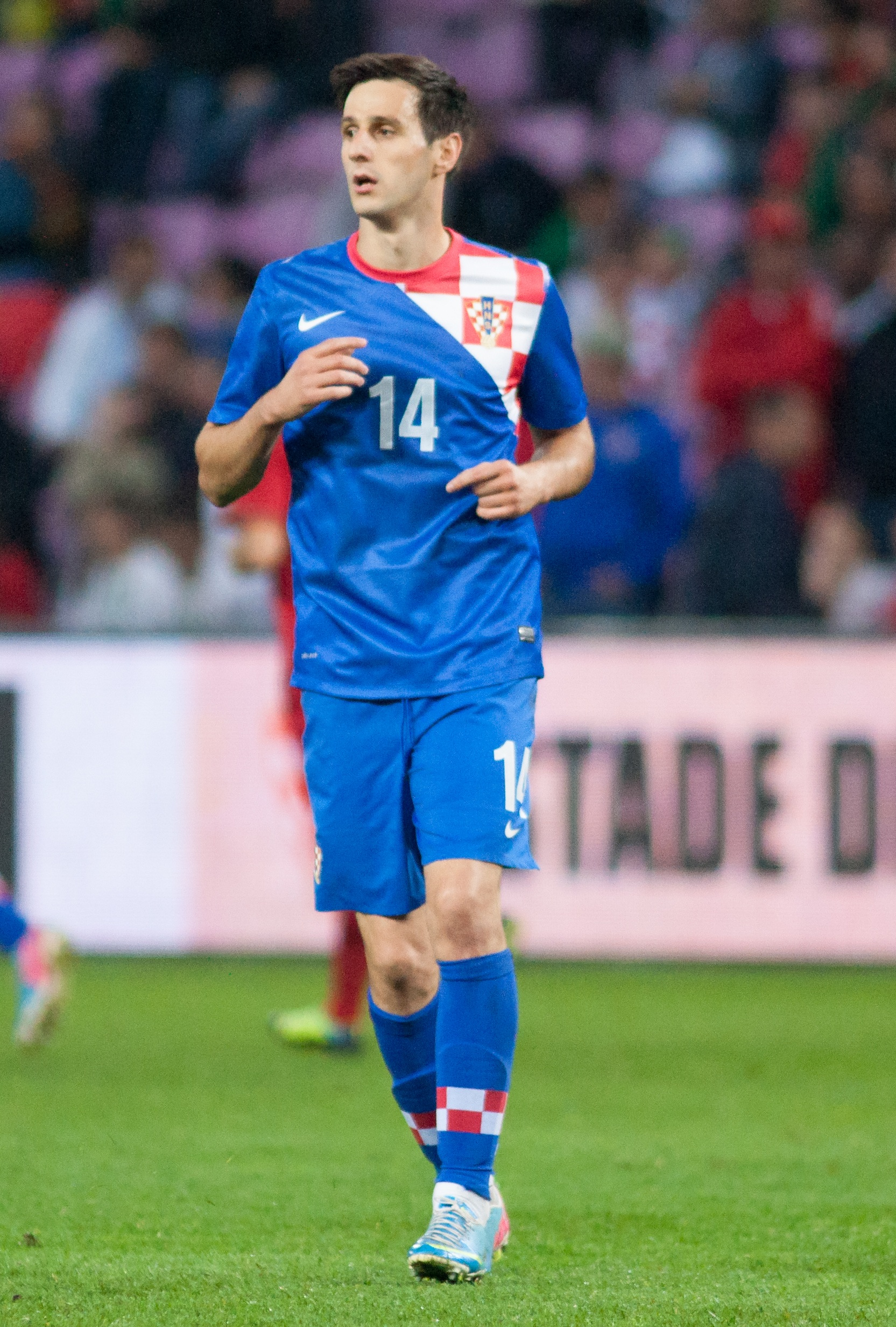
- Kalinić playing for Croatia in 2013

Personal information
- Full name: Nikola Kalinić
- Date of birth: 5 January 1988 (age 38)
- Place of birth: Split, SR Croatia, Yugoslavia
- Height: 1.87 m (6 ft 2 in)
- Position: Forward

Youth career
- 1998–2005: Hajduk Split

Senior career*
Years	Team	Apps	(Gls)
2005–2009	Hajduk Split	59	(32)
2006	→ Pula Staro Češko (loan)	12	(3)
2007	→ Šibenik (loan)	8	(3)
2009–2011	Blackburn Rovers	44	(7)
2011–2015	Dnipro Dnipropetrovsk	86	(37)
2015–2018	Fiorentina	68	(27)
2017–2018	→ AC Milan (loan)	31	(6)
2018	AC Milan	1	(0)
2018–2020	Atlético Madrid	17	(2)
2019–2020	→ Roma (loan)	15	(5)
2020–2022	Hellas Verona	33	(6)
2022–2025	Hajduk Split	40	(10)
Total		415	(140)

International career
2003	Croatia U16	2	(1)
2004–2005	Croatia U17	18	(15)
2005–2007	Croatia U19	12	(11)
2006	Croatia U20	1	(0)
2007–2010	Croatia U21	9	(4)
2008–2018	Croatia	42	(15)
Medal record
Men's football
Representing Croatia
FIFA World Cup
Runner-up	2018 Russia
- * Club domestic league appearances and goals

Nikola Kalinić (Croatian pronunciation: [nǐkola kǎlinitɕ]; born 5 January 1988) is a Croatian former professional footballer who played as a striker. He was also formerly sports director of Croatian Football League club Hajduk Split.

Kalinić began his career with Hajduk Split in his native Croatia, before moving to English club Blackburn Rovers for £6 million in 2009. After scoring rarely in two Premier League seasons, he left for Ukrainian side Dnipro, helping them reach the 2015 UEFA Europa League final. He then played in Serie A for Fiorentina and AC Milan, before signing for Spanish club Atlético Madrid ahead of the 2018–19 season, winning the 2018 UEFA Super Cup. After further stints in Italy with Roma and Hellas Verona, Kalinić returned to Hajduk Split in 2022, before ending his playing career in 2024.

Kalinić made his debut for the Croatia senior team in 2008, and represented the nation at three UEFA European Championships. Initially a part of their 2018 FIFA World Cup squad, Kalinić was sent home after the first game by manager Zlatko Dalić. Subsequently, he refused the runners-up medal when offered.

== Club career ==
=== Early career ===
Born in Split, Kalinić began his playing career at Hajduk Split. He made his Prva HNL debut in the 2005–06 season at age 17. On 1 August 2006, he was sent on loan to Pula Staro Češko to receive more first-team action. In his loan time at Pula, he had a slow but fair start considering his young age. Despite not playing all too regularly in a short single season with them, he still managed to adapt and find goalscoring form, scoring 3 goals in 12 league appearances.

Kalinić's first goals in the Prva HNL came in the 2–0 victory against Kamen Ingrad on 23 September 2006 as he scored a brace to give his side the victory. Upon ending his short time at Pula, manager Krunoslav Jurčić was largely impressed with him, stating he could become the next Zlatan Ibrahimović.

Despite his intentions to stay at Pula, Kalinić returned to Hajduk and was immediately sent out on loan to Šibenik, where he saw occasional first team action and immediately impressed with all-round performances and a goal-scoring ability, scoring three goals in eight appearances.

=== Hajduk Split ===
After clearly showing the ability to adapt well to the Croatian league, Kalinić returned to Hajduk and immediately saw plenty of first team action. He made his returning debut against Cibalia as a substitute, then secured his first start in the squad during the 2–1 victory against Osijek at the Poljud Stadium. His 17 league goals in his first season with Hajduk was only beaten by league topscorer Želimir Terkeš, who scored 21 goals. However, it was a great achievement for the youngster, who had initially set a target of scoring 15 goals. He finished the 2007–08 season in fifth place with Hajduk in the league, also helping them reach the final of the Croatian Cup in the same season. In all competitions, he ended the year with 26 goals, receiving the coveted Swan d'or Award from the Croatian Press Association.

Kalinić began the next season by scoring the second goal in Hajduk's 0–4 away victory against Maltese side Birkirara, thus advancing them to the next round of qualification for the 2008–09 UEFA Cup. In Hajduk's derby match over league rivals Dinamo Zagreb, Kalinić scored the first goal with a penalty kick. Hajduk went on to win the match 2–0 and overtake Dinamo in the league table.

Kalinić went for a one-week trial at English club Portsmouth in late July 2009, whereupon a fee thought to be in the region of £6 million was agreed between Hajduk and Portsmouth. However, the move fell through due to financial reasons. On 31 July 2009, Kalinić was heavily linked with another Premier League club, Blackburn Rovers. Later that day, the player's agent confirmed Kalinić had been at Blackburn's ground talking to the club on the 30th and 31st with regard to the deal to take the player to Ewood Park. The player's agent also confirmed that the fee was €7 million should the deal be completed; the contract had been agreed and his client was due to sign for the club. The player also made light that the Lancashire-based club expected "big things" from the highly rated Croat.

On 1 August 2009, the move stepped closer when Hajduk club president Mate Peroš confirmed Blackburn had an offer accepted by the club, the best from any club. He also said, "Very quickly we finished the talks with the club [Blackburn]."

=== Blackburn Rovers ===
On 3 August 2009, Kalinić signed for Blackburn Rovers on a four-year deal. The transfer fee is believed to be in the region of £6 million. One week later, Kalinić was successfully awarded a work permit and officially signed for the club. However, his debut was delayed as he had to return from his homeland to collect his permit, meaning he was not officially registered in time for Rovers' opening match of the season, against Manchester City. On 13 August, he was officially confirmed as a Blackburn player and was assigned the number 22 jersey for the 2009–10 season, making his debut against Sunderland nine days later.

On 27 October, Kalinić scored his first goal for Blackburn against Peterborough United in the League Cup. He scored his second goal in the quarter-final of the competition against Chelsea, but missed a penalty in the shootout which Blackburn went on to win regardless. His good cup form continued in January, scoring three goals against Aston Villa - one in the FA Cup and then the two opening goals in the second leg of the League Cup semi-final, which ended 6–4 to Villa. Kalinić scored his first Premier League goal against Wigan Athletic with a header from a resultant corner taken by Morten Gamst Pedersen in the 76th minute of a 2–1 victory.

He was handed the number nine shirt by manager Sam Allardyce at the beginning of the new Premier League campaign. Despite missing much of pre-season, Kalinić started the 2010–11 season well, scoring the only goal in Blackburn's opening day victory over Everton at Ewood Park on 14 August. On 28 December 2010, he netted his first brace in Blackburn colours in their 1–3 away win over West Bromwich Albion at The Hawthorns, though he was later sent off in this game. After Sam Allardyce was sacked as Blackburn manager, Kalinić fell out of favor with Blackburn's newly appointed manager Steve Kean.

=== Dnipro ===
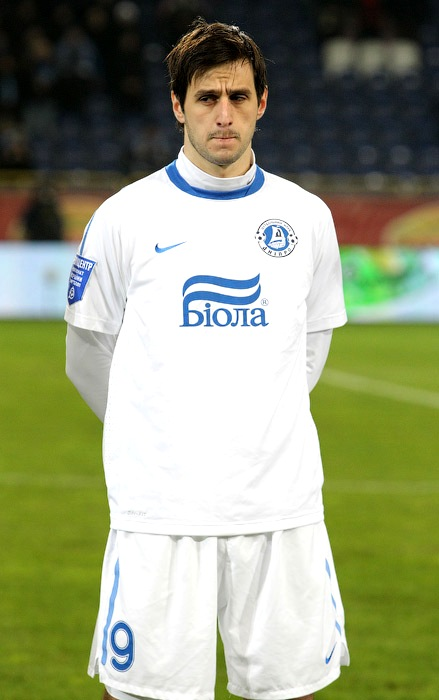
Kalinić with Dnipro

On 11 August 2011, Kalinić signed for Dnipro of the Ukrainian Premier League for an undisclosed fee. He made his debut for the club on 13 August 2011 as a second-half substitute against league champions Shakhtar Donetsk in a 3–1 defeat. He marked his first appearance for the club with a goal but was red carded for elbowing just two minutes after scoring. Kalinić netted ten goals in all competitions in both his first and second seasons with the Ukrainian side.

On 27 May 2015, Kalinić opened the scoring with a header in the Europa League Final against holders Sevilla in Warsaw, although his team eventually lost 2–3. Kalinić scored six other goals in his sides run to the Europa League final and another 12 league goals, taking his tally for the 2014–15 season to 19, the highest of his career.

=== Fiorentina ===
In August 2015, Kalinić signed a contract with Fiorentina. The fee was reported to be a figure close to €5 million. His Serie A debut came in a 2–0 win over AC Milan, and he then scored the first goal against Bologna in a match which also ended 2–0. On 27 September, Kalinić scored a hat-trick away against Inter Milan in a 4–1 victory. Due to this win, Fiorentina reached the top of Serie A for the first time since 1998–99. Eight weeks later, he scored twice in a game against Empoli, the double earning Fiorentina a 2–2 draw.

Another 11 months later, he scored another hat-trick against Cagliari, although his side was beaten 5–3. During this season (on 15 April 2017), he was sent off for the first time, against Empoli. The referee showed him the red card for his protests at the final whistle. Tianjin Quanjian made an offer of €50 million for Kalinić which was accepted by Fiorentina, but the offer was turned down by the player.

At the start of 2017–18 season, Kalinić's number 9 shirt was given to Giovanni Simeone, with Kalinić assigned the number 99 shirt instead.

==== Loan to AC Milan ====
On 22 August 2017, Kalinić joined AC Milan on loan with an obligation to purchase for a reported fee of about €25 million. He chose to wear the number 7 shirt, as it was vacant. He made his debut in a 2–1 victory at the San Siro against Cagliari on 27 August, coming on as a substitute in the 78th minute. On 17 September, he scored a brace in his first start for Milan in Serie A against Udinese as Milan won 2–1.

=== Atlético Madrid ===
On 9 August 2018, Atlético Madrid signed Kalinić on a three-year contract. Six days later, he was an unused substitute as they defeated rivals Real Madrid to win the 2018 UEFA Super Cup in Tallinn.

He made his La Liga debut in a 0–2 loss against Celta Vigo on 1 September, coming on as a substitute in the 56th minute. On 8 December 2018, he started the game against Alaves in place of the injured Diego Costa and scored his team's first goal in an eventual 3–0 home win, by tapping in (in fact from the lower part of his stomach) a curling cross from Santiago Arias, which was also his first league goal of the campaign.

He scored his first goal for the club with a powerful header in the second half to help his team in a 5–0 aggregate win in the second leg of the Round of 32 tie in the season's Copa del Rey clash against fourth tier Sant Andreu.

==== Loan to Roma ====
On 2 September 2019, Kalinić joined A.S. Roma on a season-long loan deal which included an optional purchase clause. Roma chose not to activate the clause and Kalinić returned to Atlético at the end of the season.

=== Hellas Verona ===
On 5 October 2020, Kalinić joined Hellas Verona until 2022.

=== Return to Hajduk ===
On 6 February 2022, Kalinić returned to Hajduk Split. Kalinić left the club when his contract expired in June 2023 but returned on 3 January 2024 on a short-term deal until the end of the season, accepting a symbolic monthly wage of €1.

On 27 May 2024, Kalinić ended his playing career and accepted a role of being the club's sports director. His official presentation and press conference was held the same day at the Poljud Stadium. Following an unsatisfying summer transfer window, Kalinić was relieved of his duties on 10 September 2024.

== International career ==
Kalinić was a key player in the Croatia national under-21 team during his youth playing years, also representing his country at the under-17 and -19 level. He first made a name for himself at international level at age 17 during the 2005 UEFA European Under-17 Championship when he finished the campaign as the top scorer with 11 goals. At the under-19 level, he managed another five goals during his side's preliminary round of the same tournament. He also scored a hat-trick against Lithuania in Croatia's 3–0 victory, which secured them a spot in the next elite round of the UEFA European Under-19 Championship in 2006.

Initially supposed to be called up by head coach Slaven Bilić for the few remaining qualifying matches of UEFA Euro 2008, Kalinić missed the chance due to injury and was instead replaced by Mario Mandžukić. However, his constant impressive abilities earned him a place in Croatia's final squad for Euro 2008. He made his first appearance for the senior national team on 24 May 2008, coming on as a substitute in the 62nd minute of Croatia's 1–0 friendly win against Moldova. He went on to make his first competitive appearance for his national side at Euro 2008 in Croatia's final group match against Poland, coming on as a substitute for goalscorer Ivan Klasnić in the 1–0 victory.

On 17 November 2010, Kalinić scored his first international goal, scoring the third goal in Croatia's 3–0 win at home to Malta in the Euro 2012 qualifiers. On 9 February 2011, he scored a brace in a 4–2 victory over the Czech Republic in an international friendly game.

In June 2012, Kalinić replaced the injured Ivica Olić in Croatia's squad for Euro 2012 and remained an unused substitute in the tournament.

Kalinić missed the 2014 World Cup, but received a call-up back for a friendly against Argentina in 2014, although he remained an unused substitute.

In 2015, Kalinić returned to the international level. At Euro 2016, he scored a goal and assisted in a 2–1 victory in a group stage match against defending champions Spain.

On 4 June 2018, Kalinić was named in Croatia's 23-man squad for the 2018 FIFA World Cup in Russia. On the fifth day of the tournament, he was sent home after refusing to come on as a late substitute during Croatia's first game of the competition against Nigeria, claiming to have a back injury, ending his international career. Kalinić had refused to play for the same reason previously during a friendly match against Brazil as well as during the previous day's training session. Following the conclusion of the tournament, Kalinić was awarded a silver medal for being part of the Croatian team, but refused to accept it.

== Style of play ==
Nicknamed condor, Kalinić was usually deployed as an out-and-out striker, and was mainly known for his consistent goalscoring ability, courtesy of his composure in front of goal and clinical finishing inside the box. However, he also possessed good technique and link-up play, which along with his size and selfless team-play, enabled him to hold up the ball with his back to goal, play off of other players, and create chances for teammates; as such he was capable of playing anywhere along the front line, and was also used as a second striker on occasion, or as a false 9. His movement off the ball allowed him to provide depth to his team, exploit gaps in the opposing defenice, or create space for his teammates with his attacking runs.

A tall and physically strong player, with good elevation, Kalinić was also known for his ability in the air, which made him a threat on set pieces. Although he was not gifted with significant pace, he was also a mobile player, known for his defensive work-rate off the ball when possession was lost, as well as his willingness to track back and press opponents.

== Career statistics ==
=== Club ===
Appearances and goals by club, season and competition
Club	Season	League			National cup (Note: Includes Croatian Cup, FA Cup, Ukrainian Cup, Coppa Italia, Copa del Rey)		League cup (Note: Includes Football League Cup)		Europe		Other		Total	
Club	Season	Division	Apps	Goals	Apps	Goals	Apps	Goals	Apps	Goals	Apps	Goals	Apps	Goals
Hajduk Split	2005–06	Prva HNL	6	0	1	0	—		0	0	—		7	0
Hajduk Split	2007–08	Prva HNL	25	17	7	9	—		4 (Note: Appearances in UEFA Cup)	0	—		36	26
Hajduk Split	2008–09	Prva HNL	28	15	4	2	—		4	1	—		36	18
Hajduk Split	Total		59	32	12	11	—		8	1	—		79	44
Pula Staro Češko (loan)	2006–07	Prva HNL	12	3	1	0	—		—		—		13	3
Šibenik (loan)	2006–07	Prva HNL	8	3	—		—		—		—		8	3
Blackburn Rovers	2009–10	Premier League	26	2	1	1	6	4	—		—		33	7
Blackburn Rovers	2010–11	Premier League	18	5	1	1	1	0	—		—		20	6
Blackburn Rovers	Total		44	7	2	2	7	4	—		—		53	13
Dnipro Dnipropetrovsk	2011–12	Ukrainian Premier League	19	10	0	0	—		2 (Note: Appearances in UEFA Europa League)	0	—		21	10
Dnipro Dnipropetrovsk	2012–13	Ukrainian Premier League	21	6	2	1	—		6	3	—		29	10
Dnipro Dnipropetrovsk	2013–14	Ukrainian Premier League	19	6	0	0	—		4	1	—		23	7
Dnipro Dnipropetrovsk	2014–15	Ukrainian Premier League	23	12	6	2	—		19	5	—		48	19
Dnipro Dnipropetrovsk	2015–16	Ukrainian Premier League	4	3	—		—		—		—		4	3
Dnipro Dnipropetrovsk	Total		86	37	8	3	—		31	9	—		125	49
Fiorentina	2015–16	Serie A	36	12	1	0	—		5	1	—		42	13
Fiorentina	2016–17	Serie A	32	15	2	0	—		7	5	—		41	20
Fiorentina	Total		68	27	3	0	—		12	6	—		83	33
AC Milan (loan)	2017–18	Serie A	31	6	4	0	—		6	0	—		41	6
Atlético Madrid	2018–19	La Liga	17	2	4	2	—		3 (Note: Appearances in UEFA Champions League)	0	0	0	24	4
Roma (loan)	2019–20	Serie A	15	5	2	0	—		2	0	—		19	5
Hellas Verona	2020–21	Serie A	19	2	0	0	—		—		—		19	2
Hellas Verona	2021–22	Serie A	14	4	1	0	—		—		—		15	4
Hellas Verona	Total		33	6	1	0	—		—		—		34	6
Hajduk Split	2021–22	Prva HNL	11	4	1	0	—		—		—		12	4
Hajduk Split	2022–23	HNL	18	4	0	0	—		6 (Note: Appearances in UEFA Europa Conference League)	0	1 (Note: Appearance in Croatian Super Cup)	0	25	4
Hajduk Split	2023–24	HNL	10	2	1	0	—		—		—		11	2
Hajduk Split	2024–25	HNL	2	2	0	0	—		—		—		2	2
Hajduk Split	Total		39	10	2	0	—		6	0	1	0	48	10
Hajduk total		98	42	14	11	—		14	1	1	0	127	54	
Career total			415	140	39	18	7	4	68	16	1	0	527	176

=== International ===
Appearances and goals by national team and year
National team	Year	Apps	Goals
Croatia	2008	2	0
Croatia	2009	1	0
Croatia	2010	1	1
Croatia	2011	8	3
Croatia	2012	3	1
Croatia	2013	5	1
Croatia	2014	0	0
Croatia	2015	6	2
Croatia	2016	8	5
Croatia	2017	6	2
Croatia	2018	2	0
Total		42	15

Scores and results list Croatia's goal tally first, score column indicates score after each Kalinić goal.

List of international goals scored by Nikola Kalinić
No.	Date	Venue	Cap	Opponent	Score	Result	Competition
1	17 November 2010	Stadion Maksimir, Zagreb, Croatia	4	Malta	3–0	3–0	UEFA Euro 2012 qualifying
2	9 February 2011	Stadion Aldo Drosina, Pula, Croatia	5	Czech Republic	2–0	4–2	Friendly
3	9 February 2011	Stadion Aldo Drosina, Pula, Croatia	5	Czech Republic	3–2	4–2	Friendly
4	3 June 2011	Stadion Poljud, Split, Croatia	8	Georgia	2–1	2–1	UEFA Euro 2012 qualifying
5	25 May 2012	Stadion Aldo Drosina, Pula, Croatia	13	Estonia	2–0	3–1	Friendly
6	10 September 2013	Jeonju World Cup Stadium, Jeonju, South Korea	18	South Korea	2–0	2–1	Friendly
7	10 October 2015	Stadion Maksimir, Zagreb, Croatia	24	Bulgaria	3–0	3–0	UEFA Euro 2016 qualifying
8	17 November 2015	Olimp-2, Rostov-on-Don, Russia	26	Russia	1–1	3–1	Friendly
9	4 June 2016	Stadion Rujevica, Rijeka, Croatia	29	San Marino	8–0	10–0	Friendly
10	4 June 2016	Stadion Rujevica, Rijeka, Croatia	29	San Marino	9–0	10–0	Friendly
11	4 June 2016	Stadion Rujevica, Rijeka, Croatia	29	San Marino	10–0	10–0	Friendly
12	21 June 2016	Nouveau Stade de Bordeaux, Bordeaux, France	30	Spain	1–1	2–1	UEFA Euro 2016
13	6 October 2016	Loro Boriçi Stadium, Shkodër, Albania	33	Kosovo	6–0	6–0	2018 FIFA World Cup qualification
14	24 March 2017	Stadion Maksimir, Zagreb, Croatia	35	Ukraine	1–0	1–0	2018 FIFA World Cup qualification
15	9 November 2017	Stadion Maksimir, Zagreb, Croatia	39	Greece	2–0	4–1	2018 FIFA World Cup qualification

== Honours ==
Dnipro

- UEFA Europa League runner-up: 2014–15

Atlético Madrid

- UEFA Super Cup: 2018

Hajduk Split

- Croatian Cup: 2022–23

Croatia

- FIFA World Cup runner-up: 2018

Individual

- Croatian Football Hope of the Year: 2007
- Prva HNL Player of the Year: 2008
- UEFA Europa League Team of the Group Stage: 2016–17

Orders

- Order of Duke Branimir: 2018
