= Nicola Borghetto =

Italian footballer

Personal information
- Date of birth: 25 November 1999 (age 26)
- Place of birth: Jesolo, Italy
- Height: 1.89 m (6 ft 2 in)
- Position: Goalkeeper

Team information
- Current team: Fermana
- Number: 1

Youth career
- 2017–2018: Verona

Senior career*
Years	Team	Apps	(Gls)
2015–2016	Liventina	1	(0)
2016–2018	Belluno	32	(0)
2017–2018	→ Verona (loan)	0	(0)
2018–2022	Verona	0	(0)
2018–2019	→ Mantova (loan)	26	(0)
2019–2020	→ Bisceglie (loan)	7	(0)
2021–2022	→ Monterosi (loan)	6	(0)
2022–	Fermana	39	(0)
- * Club domestic league appearances and goals as of 4 May 2024

Nicola Borghetto (born 25 November 1999) is an Italian footballer who plays as a goalkeeper for Eccellenza club Fermana.Top scorer of the tournament of the countries 2023 edition with Sant'Anastasio. He plays for Sporting Musile, in Serie D of Futsal.

== Club career ==
He started his senior career in Serie D with Liventina and Belluno.

On 7 July 2017, he was signed by the Serie A club Verona, initially on loan, and assigned to their Under-19 squad. He appeared as the back-up with the senior squad twice in the 2017–18 season, once in Serie A and once in Coppa Italia.

For the 2018–19 season, he was loaned to Serie D club Mantova.

On 29 June 2019, he signed his first professional contract with Verona for a 3-year term. On 2 September 2019, he was loaned to Bisceglie in Serie C.

He made his professional Serie C debut for Bisceglie on 24 November 2019 in a game against Paganese. He started the game and played the whole match.

On 26 August 2021, he joined Monterosi on loan.

On 1 September 2022, Borghetto signed with Fermana.
