= Stefano Sturaro =

Italian footballer (born 1993)

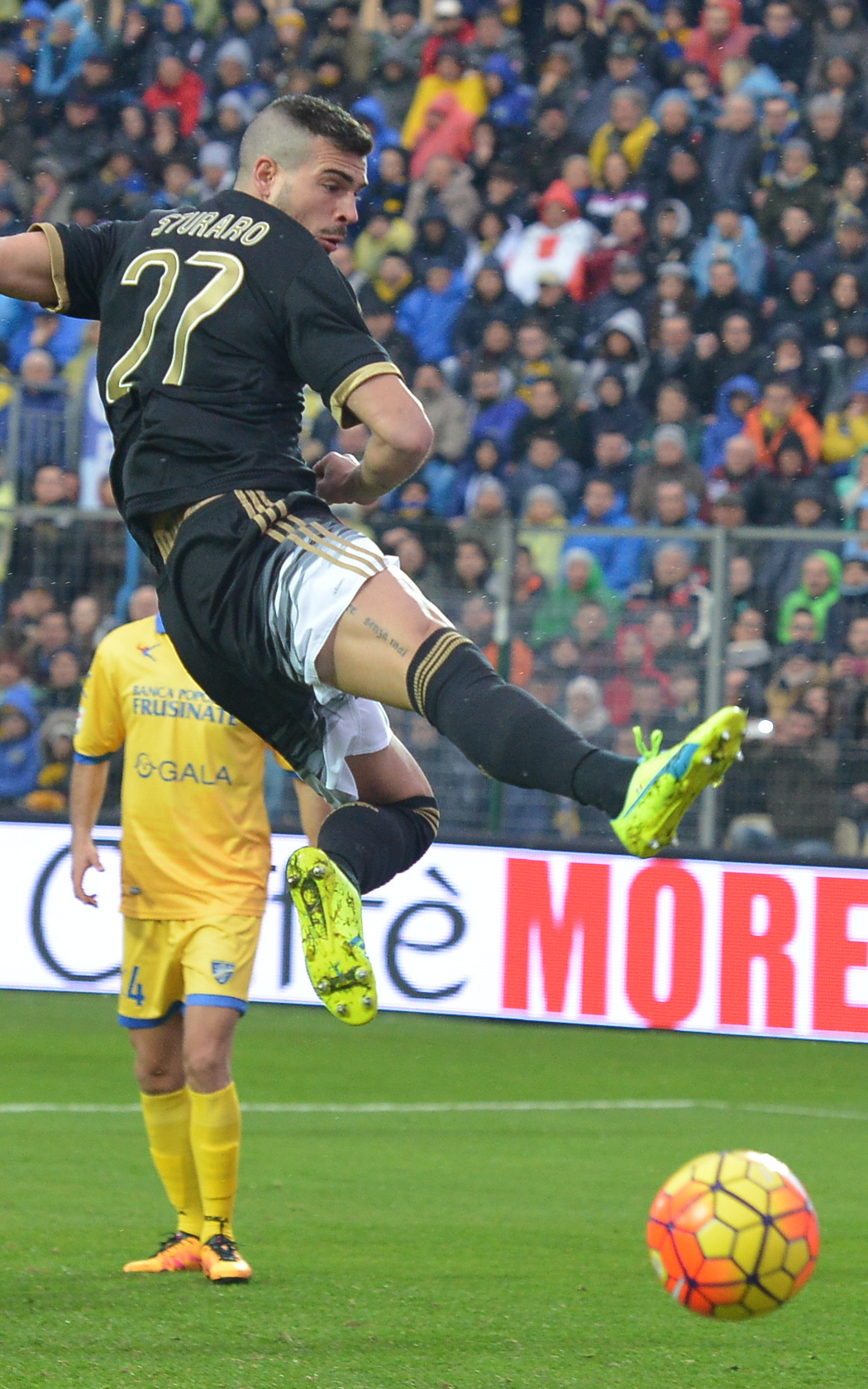
- Sturaro playing for Juventus in 2016

Personal information
- Date of birth: 9 March 1993 (age 33)
- Place of birth: Sanremo, Italy
- Height: 1.78 m (5 ft 10 in)
- Position: Midfielder

Youth career
- Sanremese
- 2008–2012: Genoa

Senior career*
Years	Team	Apps	(Gls)
2012–2014	Genoa	16	(1)
2012–2013	→ Modena (loan)	8	(0)
2014–2019	Juventus	64	(2)
2014–2015	→ Genoa (loan)	13	(0)
2018–2019	→ Sporting (loan)	0	(0)
2019	→ Genoa (loan)	0	(0)
2019–2023	Genoa	70	(3)
2021	→ Hellas Verona (loan)	10	(0)
2023–2024	Fatih Karagümrük	11	(1)
2024–2025	Catania	19	(0)
Total		211	(7)

International career
2011	Italy U18	4	(1)
2011–2012	Italy U19	6	(0)
2014–2015	Italy U21	6	(1)
2016	Italy	4	(0)
- * Club domestic league appearances and goals

Stefano Sturaro (Italian pronunciation: [ˈsteːfano stuˈraːro]; born 9 March 1993) is an Italian former professional footballer who played as a midfielder.

Sturaro began his career with local club Sanremese, and was signed by Genoa in 2008. After four years in the Genoese youth system, he was loaned to Modena in 2012. He returned to Genoa in 2013, with whom he made his Serie A debut on 25 August 2013. In July 2014, he moved to Juventus; after initially spending the first half of the 2014–15 season on loan with Genoa, he was recalled by Juventus in February 2015, where he won consecutive domestic doubles in his first four seasons with the club. He was subsequently loaned out to Portuguese club Sporting in 2018, and Genoa in January 2019, before being signed out-right by Genoa once again in the summer of 2019.

At international level, he also represented Italy at under-18 and under-19 levels, and represented the Italy under-21 at the 2015 UEFA European Under-21 Championship. He made his senior Italy debut on 6 June 2016, against Finland and was included in the squad for UEFA Euro 2016.

== Club career ==
=== Early career ===
Born in Sanremo, Italy, Sturaro began his career with local team, Sanremese before being scouted and signed by Serie A side Genoa in 2008. After joining the Ligurian club, he was assigned to the club's youth categories.

=== Genoa and Modena ===
After two seasons with the Primavera squad, Sturaro was called up to the first team, and was loaned out to Modena in the Serie B on 23 July 2012. On 1 December, he made his professional debut, playing the last 33 minutes in a 1–0 home win over Novara. He returned to Genoa having made 8 league appearances during the season.

On 25 August 2013, Sturaro made his Serie A debut, coming on as a late substitute in a 0–2 away loss against Inter. He finished the season with 16 appearances and scored his maiden professional goal on 2 March 2014 in a home win against Catania.

=== Juventus ===
On 1 July 2014, Sturaro signed a five-year contract with Juventus, for a €5.5 million fee plus bonuses up to €5.5 million (€2 million for 2014–15 season which achieved; €3.5 million for 2015 onwards). The agreement also confirmed that Sturaro would spend the 2014–15 campaign on loan at the Stadio Luigi Ferraris outfit. He was recalled from Genoa on 2 February of the following year.

On 5 May 2015, Sturaro made his debut in the UEFA Champions League in the first leg of the semi-finals, against defending champions Real Madrid. He was a contributor in Juventus' 2–1 success at the Juventus Stadium, and drew praise in the media for his decisive performance. In this same game he made an important interception against a point blank range header from James Rodríguez, this was vital as it proved to be a match winning moment in the game. He scored his first goal for Juventus on 23 May 2015, in a 3–1 home win over Napoli, after a notable dribbling run, as Juventus celebrated winning the Serie A title for the fourth consecutive time.

On 8 August 2015 he assisted a goal in Juventus's 2–0 win over Lazio in the 2015 Supercoppa Italiana. He scored his first goal of the 2015–16 season on 29 November, netting Juventus's second goal in the 89th minute of a 3–0 away win over Palermo. On 23 February 2016, Sturaro scored his first Champions League goal, the equalizing goal, in a 2–2 home draw to Bayern Munich in Juventus's first round of 16 leg.

On 15 December 2016, Sturaro renewed his contract with Juventus until 2021.

=== Sporting and return to Genoa ===
On 11 August 2018, Sturaro signed a season-long loan with Sporting.

After failing to make a single appearance for Sporting during the first half of the 2018–19 season, due to an ongoing Achilles injury, on 24 January 2019, Sturaro returned to Genoa on loan for the remainder of the season, for a loan fee of €1.5 million, with a conditional obligation to buy from Juventus. On 6 February, 13 days later, the obligation was trigged for an additional €16.5 million. The transfer fee was criticised by the media (and fans ), as Sturaro had not made his debut for Genoa prior to the announcement date of the definitive deal. La Stampa and La Gazzetta dello Sport also rumoured that the signing was part of the deal of Cristian Romero to Juventus in the future. Romero eventually join Juve on 12 July for €26 million.

He made his return debut for Genoa on 17 March 2019, coming off the bench in the 70th minute, and scoring the opening goal against his former team Juventus two minutes later, in an eventual 2–0 home win.

On 23 January 2021, Sturaro joined Hellas Verona on loan for the remainder of the season.

=== Fatih Karagümrük ===
On 21 August 2023, Sturaro joined Süper Lig club Fatih Karagümrük.

== International career ==
With the Italy Under-21 side, he took part at the 2015 UEFA European Under-21 Championship; he was sent off in the opening defeat 2–1 against eventual champions Sweden, and was banned for the remainder of the group stage as Italy were eliminated in the first round.

On 31 May 2016, Sturaro was selected as part of Antonio Conte's Italy national senior side for Euro 2016. He made his senior debut on 6 June, as he came off the bench in Italy's last friendly match before Euro 2016 against Finland in a 2–0 victory in Verona.

== Style of play ==
A quick, hard-working, and tactically versatile player, Sturaro is capable of playing anywhere in midfield; in his early career, he initially played as a "mezzala," but as his career progressed, he was usually deployed as a box-to-box, central, or defensive midfielder in front of the back-line, courtesy of his energy and qualities as a ball-winner, as well as his solid technique, and subsequent capacity to start attacking plays after obtaining possession. Due to his physical attributes and ability in the air, he is also capable of playing as a defender, both in the centre, or on either flank, and has been used as a right-sided attacking full-back or wing-back in recent seasons; he has also been fielded as a winger on occasion.

Regarded as one of the most promising footballers in the world in his position as a youngster, due to his work-rate, stamina, composure, tenacity, strength of character, and ability to read the game, his playing style drew comparisons with compatriot and 2006 World Cup winner Gennaro Gattuso in his youth. Despite usually occupying a more defensive-minded role in midfield, Sturaro is also capable of making attacking runs into the box, which led him to be compared to former Juventus midfielder Arturo Vidal during his time with the club. Although naturally right-footed, Sturaro is also capable of distributing and striking the ball with his left foot.

== Career statistics ==
=== Club ===
As of match played 22 May 2022

Appearances and goals by club, season and competition
Club	Season	League			National Cup		Europe		Other		Total	
Club	Season	Division	Apps	Goals	Apps	Goals	Apps	Goals	Apps	Goals	Apps	Goals
Modena (loan)	2012–13	Serie B	8	0	2	0	—		—		10	0
Genoa	2013–14	Serie A	16	1	0	0	—		—		16	1
Genoa	2014–15	Serie A	13	0	2	0	—		—		15	0
Genoa	Total		29	1	2	0	0	0	0	0	31	1
Juventus	2014–15	Serie A	12	1	1	0	2 (Note: All appearances in UEFA Champions League)	0	—		15	1
Juventus	2015–16	Serie A	19	1	2	0	6	1	1	0	28	2
Juventus	2016–17	Serie A	21	0	2	0	4	0	1	0	28	0
Juventus	2017–18	Serie A	12	0	2	0	5	0	0	0	19	0
Juventus	Total		64	2	7	0	17	1	2	0	90	3
Sporting (loan)	2018–19	Primeira Liga	0	0	0	0	—		—		0	0
Genoa	2018–19	Serie A	5	1	0	0	—		—		5	1
Genoa	2019–20	Serie A	16	1	2	0	—		—		18	1
Genoa	2020–21	Serie A	6	1	1	0	—		—		7	1
Genoa	2021–22	Serie A	25	0	1	0	—		—		26	0
Genoa	Total		52	3	4	0	0	0	0	0	56	3
Hellas Verona (loan)	2020–21	Serie A	10	0	—		—		—		10	0
Career total			164	6	15	0	17	1	2	0	197	7

=== International ===
As of 2 July 2016

Appearances and goals by national team and year
National team	Year	Apps	Goals
Italy	2016	4	0
Total		4	0

== Honours ==
=== Club ===
Juventus

- Serie A: 2014–15, 2015–16, 2016–17, 2017–18
- Coppa Italia: 2014–15, 2015–16, 2016–17, 2017–18
- Supercoppa Italiana: 2015
