= Adama Sane =

Senegalese footballer

Personal information
- Date of birth: 11 June 2000 (age 26)
- Place of birth: Senegal
- Height: 1.78 m (5 ft 10 in)
- Position: Forward

Team information
- Current team: Sansepolcro

Youth career
- –2021: Hellas Verona
- 2017–2018: → Juventus (loan)

Senior career*
Years	Team	Apps	(Gls)
2020–2023	Hellas Verona	0	(0)
2020–2021	→ Arezzo (loan)	6	(1)
2021	→ Mantova (loan)	6	(0)
2021–2022	→ Latina (loan)	30	(6)
2022–2023	→ Gelbison (loan)	17	(0)
2023–2024	Gżira United	8	(2)
2024–2025	Grosseto	6	(0)
2025–2026	Fossombrone	17	(2)
2026–	Sansepolcro	3	(0)
- * Club domestic league appearances and goals as of 22 February 2026

Adama Sane (born 11 June 2000) is a Senegalese professional footballer who plays as a forward for Italian Serie D club Sansepolcro.

== Career ==
Born in Senegal, Sane moved to Italy in 2014. In 2015 he joined to Hellas Verona youth sector. After scored 25 goals in 26 matches for U-17 team, he was loaned to Juventus Primavera for a season.

On 23 September 2020, he was loaned to Serie C club Arezzo. Sane made his professional debut on 27 September against Feralpisalò.

On 1 February 2021, he was loaned to Mantova.

For the 2021–22 season, he joined to Latina on loan.

On 2 September 2022, Sane moved on loan to Gelbison.

For the 2023–24 season, he was signed by Gżira United.
