= Federico Ceccherini =

Italian footballer

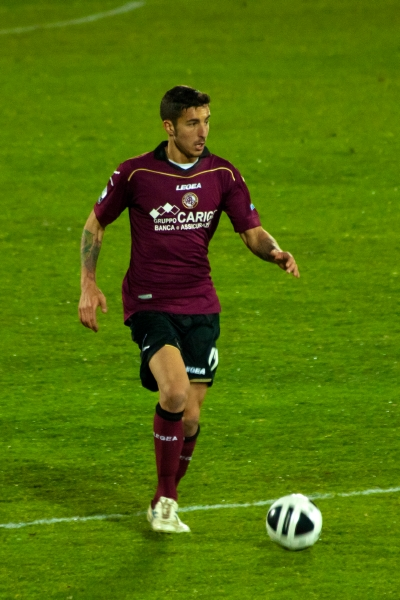

Personal information
- Date of birth: 11 May 1992 (age 34)
- Place of birth: Livorno, Italy
- Height: 1.87 m (6 ft 2 in)
- Position: Centre back

Team information
- Current team: Castellón
- Number: 11

Youth career
- 2003–2011: Livorno

Senior career*
Years	Team	Apps	(Gls)
2011–2016	Livorno	122	(4)
2011–2012	→ Pistoiese (loan)	34	(0)
2016–2018	Crotone	72	(2)
2018–2021	Fiorentina	33	(0)
2020–2021	→ Hellas Verona (loan)	25	(0)
2021–2024	Hellas Verona	56	(3)
2023–2024	→ Fatih Karagümrük (loan)	27	(1)
2024–2026	Cremonese	26	(1)
2026–	Castellón	1	(0)
- * Club domestic league appearances and goals as of 17 October 2026

Federico Ceccherini (born 11 May 1992) is an Italian professional footballer who plays as a centre back for Segunda División club Castellón.

== Club career ==
On 12 July 2018, Ceccherini signed with Fiorentina. On 5 October 2020, he joined Hellas Verona on a season-long loan. Verona held an obligation to purchase his rights if certain conditions were met.

On 15 August 2023, Ceccherini moved on a season-long loan to Fatih Karagümrük in Turkey. On 30 August of the following year, he signed a two-year contract with Cremonese in Serie B.

On 28 August 2026, Ceccherini moved to Spain, signing a one-year deal with Segunda División side Castellón.

== Career statistics ==
As of match played 15 April 2023

Appearances and goals by club, season and competition
Club	Season	League			Cup		League Cup		Other		Total	
Club	Season	Division	Apps	Goals	Apps	Goals	Apps	Goals	Apps	Goals	Apps	Goals
Livorno	2012–13	Serie B	31	1	3	0	—				34	1
Livorno	2013–14	Serie A	32	0	1	0	—				33	0
Livorno	2014–15	Serie B	27	1	0	0	—				27	1
Livorno	2015–16	Serie B	32	2	2	0	—				34	2
Livorno	Total		122	4	6	0	0	0	0	0	128	4
Pistoiese (loan)	2011–12	Serie D	34	1	1 (Note: Includes appearance Coppa Italia Serie D)	0	—				35	1
Crotone	2016–17	Serie A	35	1	1	0	—				36	1
Crotone	2017–18	Serie A	37	1	1	1	—				38	2
Crotone	Total		72	2	2	1	0	0	0	0	74	3
Fiorentina	2018–19	Serie A	15	0	2	0	—				17	0
Fiorentina	2019–20	Serie A	15	0	2	0	—				17	0
Fiorentina	2020–21	Serie A	3	0	0	0	—				3	0
Fiorentina	Total		33	0	4	0	0	0	0	0	37	0
Hellas Verona (loan)	2020–21	Serie A	25	0	1	0	—				26	0
Hellas Verona	2021–22	Serie A	34	1	1	0	—				35	1
Hellas Verona	2022–23	Serie A	22	2	1	0	—				23	2
Hellas Verona	Total		81	3	3	0	0	0	0	0	84	3
Karagümrük (loan)	2023–24	Süper Lig	27	1	4	0	—				31	1
Career totals			369	11	20	1	0	0	0	0	389	12
