= Lorenzo Bertini (footballer) =

Italian footballer (born 2001)

Personal information
- Date of birth: 17 August 2001 (age 25)
- Place of birth: Faenza, Italy
- Position: Forward

Youth career
- Cesena
- 2017–2020: Atalanta

Senior career*
| Years | Team | Apps | (Gls) |
| 2020–2023 | Hellas Verona | 0 | (0) |
| 2021–2022 | → Mantova (loan) | 17 | (2) |
| 2023–2024 | Imolese | 0 | (0) |
- * Club domestic league appearances and goals

Lorenzo Bertini (born 17 August 2001) is an Italian professional footballer who plays as a forward.

== Career ==
On 7 January 2020, Bertini signed with Hellas Verona from the youth academy of Atalanta. Bertini made his professional debut with Verona in a 2–1 Coppa Italia loss to Cagliari on 25 November 2020.

On 14 July 2021, he joined Serie C club Mantova on loan.
