= 2023–24 US Salernitana 1919 season =

US Salernitana 1919
2023–24 season
- CEO: Danilo Iervolino
- Head coach: Paulo Sousa (until 10 October); Filippo Inzaghi (10 October–11 February); Fabio Liverani (11 February–19 March); Stefano Colantuono (from 19 March)
- Stadium: Stadio Arechi
- Serie A: 20th (relegated)
- Coppa Italia: Round of 16
- Top goalscorer: League: Antonio Candreva (6); All: Antonio Candreva (7)
- Biggest win: Salernitana 4–0 Sampdoria
- Biggest defeat: Juventus 6–1 Salernitana
Home colours	Away colours	Third colours

The 2023–24 season was US Salernitana 1919's 105th season in existence and third consecutive season in the Serie A. They also competed in the Coppa Italia.

Salernitana's fate was decided on 26 April with four matches remaining following a loss to Frosinone, resulting in their relegation and a return to Serie B for the first time since 2021.

== Players ==
=== First-team squad ===
As of 15 February 2024

Note: Flags indicate national team as defined under FIFA eligibility rules; some limited exceptions apply. Players may hold more than one non-FIFA nationality.

No.	Pos.	Nation	Player
1	GK	ITA	Vincenzo Fiorillo
3	DF	CRO	Domagoj Bradarić
4	DF	GRE	Triantafyllos Pasalidis
5	DF	GER	Jérôme Boateng
6	DF	FRA	Junior Sambia
7	MF	ARG	Agustín Martegani (on loan from San Lorenzo)
9	FW	NGR	Simy
10	FW	SEN	Boulaye Dia
11	MF	FRA	Iron Gomis (on loan from Kasımpaşa)
13	GK	MEX	Guillermo Ochoa
14	FW	ISR	Shon Weissman (on loan from Granada)
17	DF	ARG	Federico Fazio (captain)
18	MF	MLI	Lassana Coulibaly
20	MF	CYP	Grigoris Kastanos
22	FW	NGR	Chukwubuikem Ikwuemesi

No.	Pos.	Nation	Player
23	DF	SVK	Norbert Gyömbér (3rd captain)
24	DF	ARG	Marco Pellegrino (on loan from AC Milan)
25	MF	ITA	Giulio Maggiore
26	MF	CRO	Toma Bašić (on loan from Lazio)
27	DF	ITA	Niccolò Pierozzi (on loan from Fiorentina)
33	FW	FRA	Loum Tchaouna
36	MF	ROU	Andres Șfaiț
44	DF	GRE	Kostas Manolas
55	MF	ITA	Emanuel Vignato (on loan from Pisa)
56	GK	FRA	Benoît Costil
59	DF	ITA	Alessandro Zanoli (on loan from Napoli)
62	GK	ITA	Pasquale Allocca
87	MF	ITA	Antonio Candreva (vice-captain)
98	DF	ITA	Lorenzo Pirola
99	MF	POL	Mateusz Łęgowski

=== Players out on loan ===
As of 15 February 2024

Note: Flags indicate national team as defined under FIFA eligibility rules; some limited exceptions apply. Players may hold more than one non-FIFA nationality.

No.	Pos.	Nation	Player
—	GK	ITA	Luigi Sepe (at Lazio until 30 June 2024)
—	GK	ITA	Alessio Di Giorgio (at Fossombrone until 30 June 2024)
—	DF	TUN	Dylan Bronn (at Servette until 30 June 2024)
—	DF	AUT	Flavius Daniliuc (at Red Bull Salzburg until 30 June 2024)
—	DF	ITA	Matteo Lovato (at Torino until 30 June 2024)
—	DF	MDA	Andrei Moțoc (at Legnago Salus until 30 June 2024)
—	MF	NOR	Emil Bohinen (at Genoa until 30 June 2024)

No.	Pos.	Nation	Player
—	MF	SEN	Mamadou Coulibaly (at Palermo until 30 June 2024)
—	MF	ITA	Edoardo Iannoni (at Perugia until 30 June 2024)
—	MF	ITA	Antonio Pio Iervolino (at Vis Pesaro until 30 June 2024)
—	FW	ITA	Federico Bonazzoli (at Hellas Verona until 30 June 2024)
—	FW	JAM	Trivante Stewart (at Javor-Matis until 30 June 2024)
—	FW	CHI	Diego Valencia (at Atromitos until 30 June 2024)

== Transfers ==
=== In ===
Pos.	Player	Transferred from	Fee	Date	Source
DF	(Italy) Lorenzo Pirola	(Italy) Internazionale	€5,000,000	1 July 2023	
MF	(Italy) Antonio Candreva	(Italy) Sampdoria	€500,000	1 July 2023	
FW	(Senegal) Boulaye Dia	(Spain) Villarreal	€12,000,000	1 July 2023	
MF	(Poland) Mateusz Łęgowski	(Poland) Pogoń Szczecin	€3,000,000	17 August 2023	
FW	(Jamaica) Trivante Stewart	(Jamaica) Mount Pleasant	€100,000	17 August 2023	
FW	(Nigeria) Chukwubuikem Ikwuemesi	(Slovenia) Celje	€1,800,000	18 August 2023	
DF	(Argentina) Agustín Martegani	(Argentina) San Lorenzo	€400,000	21 August 2023	
FW	(Cape Verde) Jovane Cabral	(Portugal) Sporting CP	Loan	23 August 2023	
MF	(France) Loum Tchaouna	(France) Rennes	Undisclosed	31 August 2023	
GK	(France) Benoît Costil	(France) Lille	Free	31 August 2023	
DF	(Italy) Alessandro Zanoli	(Italy) Napoli	Loan	17 January 2024	
MF	(Croatia) Toma Bašić	(Italy) Lazio	Loan	17 January 2024	
FW	(Israel) Shon Weissman	(Spain) Granada CF	Loan	1 February 2024	
DF	(Argentina) Marco Pellegrino	(Italy) AC Milan	Loan	1 February 2024	
MF	(Italy) Emanuel Vignato	(Italy) Pisa	Loan	1 February 2024	
DF	(Germany) Jérôme Boateng	Unattached	Free	2 February 2024	
DF	(Greece) Kostas Manolas	Unattached	Free	9 February 2024	

=== Out ===
Pos.	Player	Transferred to	Fee	Date	Source
DF	(Croatia) Luka Bogdan	(Italy) Ternana	€600,000	1 July 2023	
DF	(Poland) Pawel Jaroszynski	(Poland) Cracovia	€450,000	1 July 2023	
DF	(Italy) Valerio Mantovani	(Italy) Ternana	Undisclosed	8 August 2023	
FW	(Italy) Federico Bonazzoli	(Italy) Hellas Verona	Loan	10 August 2023	
DF	(Moldova) Andrei Moțoc	(Italy) Legnago Salus	Loan	23 August 2023	
FW	(Netherlands) Reda Boultam	(Slovenia) Olimpija Ljubljana	Undisclosed	23 August 2023	
MF	(Italy) Antonio Pio Iervolino	(Italy) Vis Pesaro	Loan	25 August 2023	
GK	(Italy) Luigi Sepe	(Italy) Lazio	Loan	25 August 2023	
FW	(Norway) Julian Kristoffersen	(Italy) Ancona	€60,000	29 August 2023	
FW	(Italy) Francesco Orlando	(Italy) Taranto	Undisclosed	31 August 2023	
GK	(Italy) Jacopo De Matteis	(Italy) Messina	Undisclosed	31 August 2023	
MF	(Senegal) Mamadou Coulibaly	(Italy) Palermo	Loan	1 September 2023	
FW	(Chile) Diego Valencia	(Greece) Atromitos	Loan	9 September 2023	
MF	(Italy) Pasquale Mazzocchi	(Italy) Napoli	€3,000,000	5 January 2024	
MF	(Norway) Emil Bohinen	(Italy) Genoa	Loan	17 January 2024	
DF	(Austria) Flavius Daniliuc	(Austria) Red Bull Salzburg	Loan	31 January 2024	
FW	(Cape Verde) Jovane Cabral	(Portugal) Sporting CP	Loan return	1 February 2024	
MF	(Italy) Kaleb Jiménez	(Italy) Atalanta U23	Loan	1 February 2024	
FW	(Norway) Erik Botheim	(Sweden) Malmö FF	Undisclosed	1 February 2024	
FW	(Jamaica) Trivante Stewart	(Serbia) Javor Ivanjica	Loan	14 February 2024	
DF	(Tunisia) Dylan Bronn	(Switzerland) Servette	Loan	15 February 2024	

== Pre-season and friendlies ==
Win Draw Loss

19 July 2023 Friendly	Salernitana (Italy)	3–0	(Italy) Pescara	Rivisondoli
		Report		Stadium: Stadio comunale di Rivisondoli; Referee: Davide Di Marco

23 July 2023 Friendly	Salernitana (Italy)	1–0	(Italy) Picerno	Rivisondoli
18:00 CEST (UTC+2)	Candreva 43'	Report		Stadium: Stadio comunale di Rivisondoli; Referee: Ermanno Feliciani
Note: Match was played in two periods of 40 minutes each.

29 July 2023 Friendly	Frosinone (Italy)	1–1	(Italy) Salernitana	Frosinone
18:00 CEST (UTC+2)	Gelli 78'	Report	Valencia 86'	Stadium: Stadio Benito Stirpe; Referee: Francesco Fourneau

1 August 2023 Friendly	Salernitana (Italy)	1–6	(Turkey) Hatayspor	Latina, Italy
19:00 CEST (UTC+2)				Stadium: Stadio Domenico Francioni

== Competitions ==
=== Overall record ===
Competition	First match	Last match	Starting round	Final position	Record							
Competition	First match	Last match	Starting round	Final position	Pld	W	D	L	GF	GA	GD	Win %
Serie A	20 August 2023	25 May 2024	Matchday 1	20th	38	2	11	25	32	81	−49	5.26
Coppa Italia	13 August 2023	4 January 2024	Round of 64	Round of 16	3	2	0	1	6	6	+0	66.67
Total					41	4	11	26	38	87	−49	9.76

Source: Soccerway

=== Serie A ===
==== League table ====
Pos	Team	Pld	W	D	L	GF	GA	GD	Pts	Qualification or relegation
16	Cagliari	38	8	12	18	42	68	−26	36 (Note: Cagliari finished ahead of Empoli on head-to-head points: Cagliari 0–0 Empoli, Empoli 0–1 Cagliari.)	
17	Empoli	38	9	9	20	29	54	−25	36	
18	Frosinone (R)	38	8	11	19	44	69	−25	35	Relegation to Serie B
19	Sassuolo (R)	38	7	9	22	43	75	−32	30	Relegation to Serie B
20	Salernitana (R)	38	2	11	25	32	81	−49	17	Relegation to Serie B

Source: Serie A
Rules for classification: 1) Points; 2) Tiebreaker for Champions team and third relegated team; 3) Head-to-head points; 4) Head-to-head goal difference; 5) Goal difference; 6) Goals scored; 7) Draw.
(Note: Head-to-head record is used only after all the matches between the teams in question have been played)
(R) Relegated

==== Results summary ====
Overall								Home						Away					
Pld	W	D	L	GF	GA	GD	Pts	W	D	L	GF	GA	GD	W	D	L	GF	GA	GD
38	2	11	25	32	81	−49	17	1	5	13	17	38	−21	1	6	12	15	43	−28

Source: Serie A

==== Results by round ====
Round	1	2	3	4	5	6	7	8	9	10	11	12	13	14	15	16	17	18	19	20	21	22	23	24	25	26	27	28	29	30	31	32	33	34	35	36	37	38
Ground	A	H	A	H	H	A	H	A	H	A	H	A	H	A	H	A	H	A	H	A	H	H	A	H	A	H	A	A	H	A	H	A	H	A	H	A	H	A
Result	D	D	L	L	D	L	L	L	D	L	L	D	W	L	L	L	D	W	L	L	L	L	D	L	L	L	D	L	L	L	D	L	L	L	L	D	L	D
Position	9	12	18	19	17	17	18	19	19	20	20	20	20	20	20	20	20	19	20	20	20	20	20	20	20	20	20	20	20	20	20	20	20	20	20	20	20	20

Source: Serie A
A = Away; H = Home; W = Win; D = Draw; L = Loss

==== Matches ====
The league fixtures were unveiled on 5 July 2023.

20 August 2023 1	Roma	2–2	Salernitana	Rome
18:30 CEST (UTC+2)	Belotti 17', 82'	Report	Candreva 36', 49'; Gyömbér (yellow card) 41'; Maggiore (yellow card) 67'; Kastanos (yellow card) 69'; Fazio (yellow card) 83'	Stadium: Stadio Olimpico; Attendance: 62,050; Referee: Ermanno Feliciani

28 August 2023 2	Salernitana	1–1	Udinese	Salerno
18:30 CEST (UTC+2)	Botheim (yellow card) 60'; Bradarić (yellow card) 64'; Pirola (yellow card) 64'; Dia 72'; Candreva (yellow card) 90+4'	Report	Lovrić (yellow card) 49'; Kabasele (yellow card) 55'; Samardžić 57'; Ferreira (yellow card) 70'; Walace (yellow card) 90+4'	Stadium: Stadio Arechi; Attendance: 20,000; Referee: Davide Massa

3 September 2023 3	Lecce	2–0	Salernitana	Lecce
20:45 CEST (UTC+2)	Krstović 6'; Kaba (yellow card) 30'; Banda (yellow card) 42'; González (yellow card) 90+4'; Strefezza 90+8' (pen.)	Report	Lovato (yellow card) 17'; Łęgowski (yellow card) 76'; Bohinen (yellow card) 83'	Stadium: Stadio Via del mare Attendance: 28,052; Referee: Luca Massimi

18 September 2023 4	Salernitana	0–3	Torino	Salerno
18:30 CEST (UTC+2)	Gyömbér (yellow card) 43'; Fazio (yellow card) 81'	Report	Buongiorno 15'; Radonjić 41', 50'; Bellanova (yellow card) 46'; Schuurs (yellow card) 74'	Stadium: Stadio Arechi; Attendance: 15,480; Referee: Antonio Giua

22 September 2023 5	Salernitana	1–1	Frosinone	Salerno
18:30 CEST (UTC+2)	Mazzocchi (yellow card) 48'; Cabral 52'; Lovato (yellow card) 81'	Report	Romagnoli 12'; Caso (yellow card) 30'; Okoli (yellow card) 34'; Fazio (yellow card) 81'	Stadium: Stadio Arechi; Attendance: 16,217; Referee: Marco Piccinini

27 September 2023 6	Empoli	1–0	Salernitana	Empoli
18:30 CEST (UTC+2)	Grassi (yellow card) 28'; Baldanzi 34'; Maleh (yellow card) 86'	Report	Maggiore (yellow card) 24'	Stadium: Stadio Carlo Castellani; Attendance: 7,979; Referee: Antonio Rapuano

30 September 2023 7	Salernitana	0–4	Internazionale	Salerno
20:45 CEST (UTC+2)	Cabral (yellow card) 60'; Gyömbér (yellow card) 69'	Report	Çalhanoğlu (yellow card) 25'; Martínez 62', 77', 85' (pen.), 89'	Stadium: Stadio Arechi; Attendance: 28,085; Referee: Rosario Abisso

8 October 2023 8	Monza	3–0	Salernitana	Monza
12:30 CEST (UTC+2)	Colpani 9'; Vignato 18', (yellow card) 29'; Pessina 82' (pen.)	Report	Bradarić (yellow card) 63'; Coulibaly (yellow card) 90+1'	Stadium: Stadio Brianteo; Attendance: 12,494; Referee: Luca Massimi

22 October 2023 9	Salernitana	2–2	Cagliari	Salerno
15:00 CEST (UTC+2)	Kastanos (yellow card) 52'; Martegani (yellow card) 79'; Dia 86', 90+5' (pen.); Gyömbér (yellow card) 90+11'	Report	Prati (yellow card) 71'; Luvumbo 79'; Zappa (yellow card) 80'; Viola 88'; Deiola (yellow card) 89'; Makoumbou (yellow card) 90+6'	Stadium: Stadio Arechi; Attendance: 17,409; Referee: Daniele Chiffi

27 October 2023 10	Genoa	1–0	Salernitana	Genoa
20:45 CEST (UTC+2)	Guðmundsson 35'; Malinovskyi (yellow card) 37'; Bani (yellow card) 42'; De Winter (yellow card) 71'	Report	Maggiore (yellow card) 37'; Bradarić (yellow card) 39'; Gyömbér (yellow card) 70'; Ikwuemesi (yellow card) 86'	Stadium: Stadio Luigi Ferraris; Attendance: 30,904; Referee: Davide Massa

4 November 2023 11	Salernitana	0–2	Napoli	Salerno
15:00 CEST (UTC+2)	Mazzocchi (yellow card) 68'	Report	Raspadori 13'; Elmas 82'; Di Lorenzo (yellow card) 88'	Stadium: Stadio Arechi; Attendance: 16,812; Referee: Antonio Rapuano

10 November 2023 12	Sassuolo	2–2	Salernitana	Reggio Emilia
18:30 CET (UTC+1)	Thorstvedt 36', 52', (yellow card) 80'; Toljan (yellow card) 71'	Report	Ikwuemesi 5', (yellow card) 45'; Dia 17'	Stadium: Mapei Stadium – Città del Tricolore; Attendance: 10,495; Referee: Davide Ghersini

25 November 2023 13	Salernitana	2–1	Lazio	Salerno
15:00 CET (UTC+1)	Gyömbér (yellow card) 42'; Daniliuc (yellow card) 53'; Kastanos 55'; Candreva 66'; Maggiore (yellow card) 84'; Fazio (yellow card) 88'; Coulibaly (yellow card) 90+4'	Report	Lazzari (yellow card) 32'; Immobile 43' (pen.); Cataldi (yellow card) 79'; Vecino (yellow card) 90+4'	Stadium: Stadio Arechi; Attendance: 16,700; Referee: Alessandro Prontera

3 December 2023 14	Fiorentina	3–0	Salernitana	Florence
15:00 CET (UTC+1)	Beltrán 6' (pen.); Sottil 18'; Ranieri (yellow card) 44'; Bonaventura 56'	Report		Stadium: Stadio Artemio Franchi; Attendance: 26,286; Referee: Paride Tremolada

10 December 2023 15	Salernitana	1–2	Bologna	Salerno
18:00 CET (UTC+1)	Coulibaly (yellow card) 26'; Tchaouna (yellow card) 37'; Mazzocchi (yellow card) 39'; Dia (yellow card) 43'; Daniliuc (yellow card) 48'; Gyömbér (yellow card) 54'; Simy 75'; Kastanos (yellow card) 89'; Fazio (red card) 90+3'	Report	Zirkzee 9', 20', (yellow card) 44'; Skorupski (yellow card) 90+6'	Stadium: Stadio Arechi; Attendance: 16,650; Referee: Simone Sozza
Note: Fazio was sent off for dissent while a substitute.

18 December 2023 16	Atalanta	4–1	Salernitana	Bergamo
20:45 CET (UTC+1)	Muriel 47'; Pašalić 52'; Ruggeri (yellow card) 77'; De Ketelaere 83'; Miranchuk 89'	Report	Pirola 10', (yellow card) 40'; Maggiore (yellow card) 65'	Stadium: Gewiss Stadium; Attendance: 14,264; Referee: Ermanno Feliciani

22 December 2023 17	Salernitana	2–2	Milan	Salerno
20:45 CET (UTC+1)	Fazio 42'; Kastanos (yellow card) 44'; Candreva 63'; Mazzocchi (yellow card) 71'; Gyömbér (yellow card) 74'	Report	Tomori 17'; Leão (yellow card) 35'; Jović 90'	Stadium: Stadio Arechi; Attendance: 23,467; Referee: Daniele Doveri

30 December 2023 18	Hellas Verona	0–1	Salernitana	Verona
18:00 CET (UTC+1)	Ngonge (yellow card) 38'; Doig (yellow card) 79'	Report	Tchaouna 48'; Łęgowski (yellow card) 72'	Stadium: Stadio Marcantonio Bentegodi; Attendance: 18,181; Referee: Maurizio Mariani

7 January 2024 19	Salernitana	1–2	Juventus	Salerno
18:00 CET (UTC+1)	Gyömbér (yellow card) 19'; Maggiore (yellow card) 32' (yellow-red card) 53', (goal) 39'	Report	Gatti (yellow card) 43'; Iling-Junior 65'; McKennie (yellow card) 69'; Rugani (yellow card) 73'; Vlahović 90+1', (yellow card) 90+2'; Rabiot (yellow card) 90+3'	Stadium: Stadio Arechi; Attendance: 29,405; Referee: Marco Guida
Note: The match was originally scheduled to be played at 20:45 CET, before being pushed back to 18:00.

13 January 2024 20	Napoli	2–1	Salernitana	Naples
15:00 CET (UTC+1)	Cajuste (yellow card) 34'; Politano 45+4' (pen.); Rrahmani 90+6', (yellow card) 90+6'; Kvaratskhelia (yellow card) 90+10'	Report	Candreva 29'; Łęgowski (yellow card) 43'; Bradarić (yellow card) 90+5'	Stadium: Stadio Diego Armando Maradona; Attendance: 35,000; Referee: Livio Marinelli

21 January 2024 21	Salernitana	1–2	Genoa	Salerno
18:00 CET (UTC+1)	Martegani 2'	Report	Retegui 13'; Frendrup (yellow card) 29'; Badelj (yellow card) 45+1'; Guðmundsson 58' (pen.); Bani (yellow card) 60'; Vogliacco (yellow card) 71'; Martínez (yellow card) 90+1'	Stadium: Stadio Arechi; Attendance: 17,440; Referee: Daniele Orsato

29 January 2024 22	Salernitana	1–2	Roma	Salerno
20:45 CET (UTC+1)	Pierozzi (yellow card) 44'; Kastanos 70'; Candreva (yellow card) 88'	Report	Pellegrini (yellow card) 45+4', (goal) 66'; Dybala 51' (pen.), (yellow card) 84'; Patrício (yellow card) 89'	Stadium: Stadio Arechi; Attendance: 18,038; Referee: Marco Di Bello

4 February 2024 23	Torino	0–0	Salernitana	Turin
12:30 CET (UTC+1)	Sazonov (yellow card) 26'; Linetty (yellow card) 90'	Report	Pierozzi (yellow card) 63'	Stadium: Stadio Olimpico Grande Torino; Attendance: 24,461; Referee: Daniele Chiffi

9 February 2024 24	Salernitana	1–3	Empoli	Salerno
20:45 CET (UTC+1)	Zanoli (yellow card) 43'; Weissman 69'; Bašić (yellow card) 77'; Bradarić (yellow card) 90+4'	Report	Maleh (yellow card) 22'; Zanoli 23' (o.g.); Niang 88' (pen.); Cerri (yellow card) 90+4'; Cancellieri 90+4'	Stadium: Stadio Arechi; Attendance: 18,510; Referee: Maurizio Mariani

16 February 2024 25	Internazionale	4–0	Salernitana	Milan
21:00 CET (UTC+1)	Thuram 17'; Martínez 19'; Dumfries 40'; Arnautović 90'	Report	Tchaouna (yellow card) 71'	Stadium: San Siro; Attendance: 72,609; Referee: Marco Piccinini

24 February 2024 26	Salernitana	0–2	Monza	Salerno
18:00 CET (UTC+1)	Pasalidis (yellow card) 38'; Bašić (yellow card) 72'	Report	Marí (yellow card) 48'; Izzo (yellow card) 63'; Maldini 78'; Pessina 83'	Stadium: Stadio Arechi; Attendance: 18,560; Referee: Michael Fabbri

2 March 2024 27	Udinese	1–1	Salernitana	Udine
15:00 CET (UTC+1)	Ebosele (yellow card) 16' (yellow-red card) 64'; Payero (yellow card) 36'; Kamara 45+3'; Giannetti (yellow card) 47'; Walace (yellow card) 75'	Report	Tchaouna 10'; Pellegrino (yellow card) 50'	Stadium: Stadio Friuli; Attendance: 20,369; Referee: Gianluca Manganiello

9 March 2024 28	Cagliari	4–2	Salernitana	Cagliari
15:00 CET (UTC+1)	Lapadula 12'; Gaetano 40'; Shomurodov 51', 76'; Augello (yellow card) 70'	Report	Kastanos 56', (yellow card) 73'; Maggiore 58'; Sambia (yellow card) 85'	Stadium: Unipol Domus; Attendance: 16,118; Referee: Francesco Fourneau

16 March 2024 29	Salernitana	0–1	Lecce	Salerno
18:00 CET (UTC+1)	Coulibaly (yellow card) 30'; Maggiore (yellow card) 45'; Pirola (yellow card) 73'; Zanoli (yellow card) 82'	Report	Gyömbér 17' (o.g.); Ramadani (yellow card) 49'; Piccoli (yellow card) 54'; Pongračić (yellow card) 90+7'	Stadium: Stadio Arechi; Attendance: 15,376; Referee: Fabio Maresca

1 April 2024 30	Bologna	3–0	Salernitana	Bologna
12:30 CEST (UTC+2)	Orsolini 14'; Saelemaekers 44'; Lykogiannis 90+2'	Report	Pierozzi (yellow card) 17'; Candreva (yellow card) 45+1'; Tchaouna (yellow card) 77'	Stadium: Stadio Renato Dall'Ara; Attendance: 27,255; Referee: Ermanno Feliciani

5 April 2024 31	Salernitana	2–2	Sassuolo	Salerno
20:45 CEST (UTC+2)	Pierozzi (yellow card) 27'; Candreva 52' (pen.); Maggiore (yellow card) 62', (goal) 90+1'; Pirola (yellow card) 72'; Vignato (yellow card) 90+7'	Report	Laurienté 37', (yellow card) 67'; Bajrami 44'; Kumbulla (yellow card) 82'; Račić (yellow card) 90+3'	Stadium: Stadio Arechi; Attendance: 14,306; Referee: Simone Sozza

12 April 2024 32	Lazio	4–1	Salernitana	Rome
20:45 CEST (UTC+2)	Felipe Anderson 7', 35'; Vecino 14'; Isaksen 87'	Report	Tchaouna 16'; Coulibaly (yellow card) 36'	Stadium: Stadio Olimpico; Attendance: 36,000; Referee: Luca Zufferli

21 April 2024 33	Salernitana	0–2	Fiorentina	Salerno
18:00 CEST (UTC+2)	Bašić (yellow card) 45+1'; Candreva (yellow card) 61'	Report	Lopez (yellow card) 18'; Sottil (yellow card) 45'; Ranieri (yellow card) 47'; Martínez Quarta (yellow card) 77'; Kouamé 80'; Ikoné 90+5'	Stadium: Stadio Arechi; Attendance: 14,597; Referee: Matteo Marchetti

26 April 2024 34	Frosinone	3–0	Salernitana	Frosinone
20:45 CEST (UTC+2)	Soulé 10' (pen.); Brescianini 25'; Zortea (yellow card) 41', (goal) 85'; Mazzitelli (yellow card) 50'	Report	Sambia (yellow card) 9'; Pierozzi (yellow card) 36'	Stadium: Stadio Benito Stirpe; Attendance: 13,728; Referee: Francesco Fourneau

6 May 2024 35	Salernitana	1–2	Atalanta	Salerno
18:00 CEST (UTC+2)	Tchaouna 18'; Pasalidis (yellow card) 45+1'	Report	Scamacca 57'; Koopmeiners 63'	Stadium: Stadio Arechi; Attendance: 12,980; Referee: Ermanno Feliciani

12 May 2024 36	Juventus	1–1	Salernitana	Turin
18:00 CEST (UTC+2)	Vlahović (yellow card) 22'; Rabiot (yellow card) 25', (goal) 90+1'	Report	Pierozzi 27'; Zanoli (yellow card) 68'; Sambia (yellow card) 85'; Fiorillo (yellow card) 88'; Pasalidis (yellow card) 90+3'; Bašić (yellow card) 90+7'	Stadium: Juventus Stadium; Attendance: 37,305; Referee: Alberto Santoro

20 May 2024 37	Salernitana	1–2	Hellas Verona	Salerno
18:30 CEST (UTC+2)	Sambia (yellow card) 14'; Bašić (yellow card) 71'; Tchaouna (yellow card) 73'; Maggiore 90'	Report	Suslov 22'; Folorunsho 45+3'; Duda (yellow card) 56'; Serdar (yellow card) 73'	Stadium: Stadio Arechi; Attendance: 15,998; Referee: Marco Di Bello

25 May 2024 38	Milan	3–3	Salernitana	Milan
20:45 CEST (UTC+2)	Leão 22'; Giroud 27'; Calabria 77'	Report	Pierozzi (yellow card) 51'; Simy 64', 89'; Sambia 87'	Stadium: San Siro; Attendance: 70,831; Referee: Davide Di Marco

=== Coppa Italia ===
13 August 2023 Round of 64	Salernitana	1–0	Ternana	Salerno
17:45 CEST (UTC+2)	Candreva 7'; Bradarić (yellow card) 39'; Kastanos (yellow card) 48'	Report	Diakite (yellow card) 90+5'; Bogdan (yellow card) 90+7'	Stadium: Stadio Arechi; Attendance: 9,248; Referee: Antonio Giua

31 October 2023 Round of 32	Salernitana	4–0	Sampdoria	Salerno
18:00 CET (UTC+1)	Ikwuemesi 28'; Tchaouna 45+1', 67'; Cabral 86'	Report	Giordano (yellow card) 44'; Depaoli (yellow card) 53'; Ghilardi (yellow card) 69'	Stadium: Stadio Arechi; Attendance: 4,740; Referee: Gianluca Manganiello

4 January 2024 Round of 16	Juventus	6–1	Salernitana	Turin
21:00 CET (UTC+1)	Miretti 12'; Cambiaso 35'; Rugani 54'; Bronn 75' (o.g.); Yıldız 88'; Weah 90+1'	Report	Ikwuemesi 1'; Maggiore (yellow card) 40'	Stadium: Juventus Stadium; Attendance: 40,548; Referee: Davide Ghersini

=== Trofeo Angelo Iervolino ===
5 August 2023 Final	Salernitana (Italy)	2–1	(Germany) FC Augsburg	Salerno
20:30 CEST (UTC+2)	Coulibaly 59'; Botheim 73'	Report	Tietz 53' (pen.)	Stadium: Stadio Arechi; Attendance: 3,064; Referee: Fabio Maresca (Italia)
