= 2022–23 US Salernitana 1919 season =

Salernitana
2022–23 season
- CEO: Danilo Iervolino
- Manager: Davide Nicola (until 15 February); Paulo Sousa (from 15 February)
- Stadium: Stadio Arechi
- Serie A: 15th
- Coppa Italia: Round of 64
- Top goalscorer: League: Boulaye Dia (16); All: Boulaye Dia (16)
- Biggest win: Salernitana 4–0 Sampdoria
- Biggest defeat: Atalanta 8–2 Salernitana
Home colours	Away colours	Third colours

The 2022–23 season was the 104th season in the history of U.S. Salernitana 1919 and their second consecutive season in the top flight. The club participated in Serie A and the Coppa Italia.

== Players ==
=== First-team squad ===
As of 6 January 2023

Note: Flags indicate national team as defined under FIFA eligibility rules; some limited exceptions apply. Players may hold more than one non-FIFA nationality.

No.	Pos.	Nation	Player
1	GK	ITA	Vincenzo Fiorillo
2	DF	TUN	Dylan Bronn
3	DF	CRO	Domagoj Bradarić
5	DF	AUT	Flavius Daniliuc
6	MF	FRA	Junior Sambia
8	MF	NOR	Emil Bohinen
9	FW	ITA	Federico Bonazzoli
10	MF	NED	Tonny Vilhena (on loan from Espanyol)
11	FW	NOR	Erik Botheim
13	GK	MEX	Guillermo Ochoa
14	FW	CHI	Diego Valencia
16	MF	SRB	Ivan Radovanović
17	DF	ARG	Federico Fazio (captain)
18	MF	MLI	Lassana Coulibaly
19	FW	NOR	Julian Kristoffersen

No.	Pos.	Nation	Player
20	MF	CYP	Grigoris Kastanos
23	DF	SVK	Norbert Gyömbér
25	MF	ITA	Giulio Maggiore
26	DF	FRA	Sanasi Sy
28	MF	ITA	Leonardo Capezzi
29	FW	SEN	Boulaye Dia (on loan from Villarreal)
30	MF	ITA	Pasquale Mazzocchi
33	GK	ITA	Luigi Sepe
41	MF	ITA	Hans Nicolussi (on loan from Juventus)
66	DF	ITA	Matteo Lovato
71	GK	ITA	Jacopo De Matteis
87	MF	ITA	Antonio Candreva (on loan from Sampdoria)
98	DF	ITA	Lorenzo Pirola (on loan from Internazionale)
99	FW	POL	Krzysztof Piątek (on loan from Hertha BSC)

=== Other players under contract ===
As of 10 January 2023

Note: Flags indicate national team as defined under FIFA eligibility rules; some limited exceptions apply. Players may hold more than one non-FIFA nationality.

No. / Pos. / Nation / Player; — / MF / ITA / Gioacchino Galeotafiore	No. / Pos. / Nation / Player

=== Other players under contract ===
As of 1 September 2022

Note: Flags indicate national team as defined under FIFA eligibility rules; some limited exceptions apply. Players may hold more than one non-FIFA nationality.

No. / Pos. / Nation / Player; — / MF / ITA / Gioacchino Galeotafiore	No. / Pos. / Nation / Player; — / MF / ITA / Francesco Orlando

== Pre-season and friendlies ==
Win Draw Loss Fixtures

8 July 2022 Friendly	SK Jenbach (Austria)	0–9	(Italy) Salernitana	Jenbach, Austria
18:00 CEST (UTC+2)		Report	Simy 14'; Mazzocchi 41'; D'Andrea 55', 57', 90'; Kristoffersen 62', 73', 85'; Boultam 83' (pen.)	Stadium: Jenbach Stadion; Referee: Rene Schrett

13 July 2022 Friendly	Schalke 04 (Germany)	0–0	(Italy) Salernitana	Wörgl, Austria
18:00 CEST (UTC+2)	Lee (yellow card) 56'	Report	Fazio (yellow card) 54'	Stadium: Sportstadion Wörgl; Attendance: 1,850; Referee: Andreas Heiß (Austria)

16 July 2022 Friendly	Salernitana (Italy)	2–2	(Germany) 1899 Hoffenheim	Kitzbühel, Austria
15:00 CEST (UTC+2)	Kristoffersen 16', (penalty missed) 31'; Cavion 38'	Report	Kramarić 8'; Rutter 37'	Stadium: Sportplatz Langau; Referee: Andreas Schett (Austria)

20 July 2022 Friendly	Salernitana (Italy)	2–0	(Poland) Wieczysta Kraków	Jenbach, Austria
15:00 CEST (UTC+2)	Ribéry 3' (pen.); Botheim 6'; Fiorillo (yellow card) 65'	Report	Kołodziej (yellow card) 45+2'	Stadium: Stadion Jenbach; Referee: Olivia Tschon (Austria)

27 July 2022 Friendly	Galatasaray (Turkey)	1–1	(Italy) Salernitana	Innsbruck, Austria
19:00 CEST (UTC+2)	Seferovic 13'; Bardakcı (yellow card) 51'; Kılınç (yellow card) 65'	Report	Botheim 11'; Moțoc (yellow card) 22'	Stadium: Tivoli Stadion Tirol; Referee: Walter Altmann (Austria)

30 July 2022 Trofeo Angelo Iervolino	Salernitana (Italy)	1–3	(Turkey) Adana Demirspor	Salerno
CEST (UTC+2)	Bonazzoli 36'; Fazio (red card); Coulibaly (red card)		Onyekuru 1'; Assombalonga 6'; Belhanda 17'; Akaydın (red card); Rodrigues (red card)	Stadium: Stadio Arechi; Referee: Gianpiero Miele

30 July 2022 Trofeo Angelo Iervolino	Salernitana (Italy)	1–0	(Italy) Reggina	Salerno
CEST (UTC+2)	Kristoffersen 10'			Stadium: Stadio Arechi; Referee: Livio Marinelli

10 December 2022 Friendly	Fenerbahçe (Turkey)	3–0	(Italy) Salernitana	Alanya, Turkey
16:00 TRT (UTC+3)	Kahveci 34'; King 58'; Batshuayi 90+2' (pen.)		Coulibaly (yellow card) 41'	Stadium: Kırbıyık Holding Stadium; Referee: Murat Erdoğan

15 December 2022 Friendly	Alanyaspor (Turkey)	3–1	(Italy) Salernitana	Alanya, Turkey
16:00 TRT (UTC+3)	Mahgoub 29'; Karaca 48'; Doumbia 90+1'		Bonazzoli 9'	Stadium: Kırbıyık Holding Stadium

== Competitions ==
=== Overall record ===
Competition	First match	Last match	Starting round	Final position	Record							
Competition	First match	Last match	Starting round	Final position	Pld	W	D	L	GF	GA	GD	Win %
Serie A	14 August 2022	3 June 2023	Matchday 1	15th	38	9	15	14	48	62	−14	23.68
Coppa Italia	7 August 2022		Round of 64	Round of 64	1	0	0	1	0	2	−2	0.00
Total					39	9	15	15	48	64	−16	23.08

Source: Soccerway

=== Serie A ===
==== League table ====
Pos	Team	Pld	W	D	L	GF	GA	GD	Pts	Qualification or relegation
13	Sassuolo	38	12	9	17	47	61	−14	45	
14	Empoli	38	10	13	15	37	49	−12	43	
15	Salernitana	38	9	15	14	48	62	−14	42	
16	Lecce	38	8	12	18	33	46	−13	36	
17	Spezia (R)	38	6	13	19	31	62	−31	31 (Note: Head-to-head points: Spezia 4 Hellas Verona 1)	Qualification for the Relegation tie-breaker (Note: Should the first and second, or 17th and 18th-placed teams at the end of the season be tied on points, a play-off tiebreaker match was held at a neutral site to determine the title and final team relegated respectively.)

Source: Serie A
Rules for classification: 1) Points; 2) Tiebreaker for Champions team and third relegated team; 3) Head-to-head points; 4) Head-to-head goal difference; 5) Goal difference; 6) Goals scored; 7) Draw. (Note: Head-to-head record is used only after all the matches between the teams in question have been played)
(R) Relegated

==== Results summary ====
Overall								Home						Away					
Pld	W	D	L	GF	GA	GD	Pts	W	D	L	GF	GA	GD	W	D	L	GF	GA	GD
38	9	15	14	48	62	−14	42	7	6	6	30	26	+4	2	9	8	18	36	−18

Source: Serie A

==== Results by round ====
Round	1	2	3	4	5	6	7	8	9	10	11	12	13	14	15	16	17	18	19	20	21	22	23	24	25	26	27	28	29	30	31	32	33	34	35	36	37	38
Ground	H	A	H	A	H	A	H	A	H	A	H	A	H	A	A	H	H	A	H	A	H	A	H	H	A	A	H	A	H	A	H	A	H	A	H	A	H	A
Result	L	D	W	D	D	D	L	L	W	L	W	W	D	L	L	L	D	L	L	W	L	L	L	W	D	D	D	D	D	D	W	D	D	L	W	D	W	L
Position	15	14	10	10	10	10	13	14	11	12	11	10	9	11	12	14	14	16	16	14	16	16	16	16	16	16	16	15	15	15	14	14	14	15	15	15	15	15

Source: Serie A
A = Away; H = Home; W = Win; D = Draw; L = Loss

==== Matches ====
The league fixtures were announced on 24 June 2022.

14 August 2022 1	Salernitana	0–1	Roma	Salerno
20:45 CEST (UTC+2)	Coulibaly (yellow card) 28'; Gyömbér (yellow card) 39'; Kastanos (yellow card) 40'	Report	Cristante 33'; Smalling (yellow card) 48'; Matić (yellow card) 72'	Stadium: Stadio Arechi; Attendance: 24,983; Referee: Simone Sozza

20 August 2022 2	Udinese	0–0	Salernitana	Udine
18:30 CEST (UTC+2)	Makengo (yellow card) 29'; Walace (yellow card) 45+1'; Pérez (red card) 45+4'	Report	Bonazzoli (yellow card) 35'; Bradarić (yellow card) 49'; Bronn (yellow card) 66'; Gyömbér (yellow card) 74'	Stadium: Stadio Friuli; Attendance: 17,054; Referee: Gianluca Aureliano

28 August 2022 3	Salernitana	4–0	Sampdoria	Salerno
18:30 CEST (UTC+2)	Dia 7'; Bonazzoli 16'; Mazzocchi (yellow card) 26'; Vilhena 50'; Botheim 76', (yellow card) 85'	Report	Depaoli (yellow card) 11'; Rincón (yellow card) 79'	Stadium: Stadio Arechi; Attendance: 19,116; Referee: Davide Massa

1 September 2022 4	Bologna	1–1	Salernitana	Bologna
20:45 CEST (UTC+2)	Arnautović 52' (pen.); Medel (yellow card) 64'; De Silvestri (yellow card) 65'	Report	Gyömbér (yellow card) 50'; Vilhena (yellow card) 82'; Dia 88'	Stadium: Stadio Renato Dall'Ara; Attendance: 19,787; Referee: Davide Ghersini

5 September 2022 5	Salernitana	2–2	Empoli	Salerno
18:30 CEST (UTC+2)	Mazzocchi 39', (yellow card) 40'; Coulibaly (yellow card) 42'; Dia 61'; Kastanos (yellow card) 90+1'	Report	Satriano 31', (yellow card) 52'; Lammers 81'; Akpa Akpro (yellow card) 87'	Stadium: Stadio Arechi; Attendance: 18,173; Referee: Rosario Abisso

11 September 2022 6	Juventus	2–2	Salernitana	Turin
20:45 CEST (UTC+2)	Paredes (yellow card) 27'; Kean (yellow card) 32'; Bremer (yellow card) 45+4', (goal) 51'; Milik (yellow card) 83' (yellow-red card) 90+6'; Bonucci (penalty missed) 90+3', 90+3'; Cuadrado (red card) 90+9'	Report	Candreva 18'; Maggiore (yellow card) 38'; Piątek 45+5' (pen.), (yellow card) 55'; Fazio (yellow card) 53', (red card) 90+8'; Sepe (yellow card) 72'	Stadium: Juventus Stadium; Attendance: 35,097; Referee: Matteo Marcenaro

16 September 2022 7	Salernitana	1–2	Lecce	Salerno
20:45 CEST (UTC+2)	Coulibaly (yellow card) 10'; Gonzàlez 55' (o.g.)	Report	Ceesay 43'; Di Francesco (yellow card) 47'; Gonzàlez (yellow card) 60'; Strefezza 83', (yellow card) 84'	Stadium: Stadio Arechi; Attendance: 19,488; Referee: Daniele Doveri

2 October 2022 8	Sassuolo	5–0	Salernitana	Reggio Emilia
15:00 CEST (UTC+2)	Laurienté 12'; Pinamonti 39' (pen.); Thorstvedt 53'; Rogério (yellow card) 74'; Harroui 76'; Antiste 90+2'	Report	Vilhena (yellow card) 58'	Stadium: Mapei Stadium; Attendance: 15,786; Referee: Maria Sole Ferrieri Caputi

9 October 2022 9	Salernitana	2–1	Hellas Verona	Salerno
15:00 CEST (UTC+2)	Piątek 18', (yellow card) 22'; Sambia (yellow card) 90+2'; Dia 90+4'; Daniliuc (yellow card) 90+4'; Radovanović (red card) 90+8'	Report	Hien (yellow card) 23'; Depaoli (yellow card) 45+2', (goal) 56'; Sulemana (yellow card) 79'; Ceccherini (red card) 90+8'	Stadium: Stadio Arechi; Attendance: 15,922; Referee: Davide Ghersini

16 October 2022 10	Internazionale	2–0	Salernitana	Milan
12:30 CEST (UTC+2)	Martínez 14'; Barella 58'	Report	Daniliuc (yellow card) 17'	Stadium: San Siro; Attendance: 75,425; Referee: Juan Luca Sacchi

22 October 2022 11	Salernitana	1–0	Spezia	Salerno
15:00 CEST (UTC+2)	Vilhena (yellow card) 19'; Mazzocchi 48'; Daniliuc (yellow card) 81'	Report	Amian (yellow card) 20'; Kiwior (yellow card) 61'; Agudelo (yellow card) 81'; Holm (yellow card) 82'	Stadium: Stadio Arechi; Attendance: 17,260; Referee: Daniele Chiffi

30 October 2022 12	Lazio	1–3	Salernitana	Rome
18:00 CET (UTC+1)	Zaccagni 41'; Milinković-Savić (yellow card) 72'; Marušić (yellow card) 75'; Cancellieri (yellow card) 90+6'	Report	Candreva 51'; Coulibaly (yellow card) 56'; Fazio 68'; Dia 76', (yellow card) 90+6'; Sepe (yellow card) 90+5'	Stadium: Stadio Olimpico; Attendance: 41,500; Referee: Gianluca Manganiello

5 November 2022 13	Salernitana	2–2	Cremonese	Salerno
15:00 CET (UTC+1)	Piątek 3'; Fazio (yellow card) 8'; Coulibaly 38'; Sepe (yellow card) 90'	Report	Okereke 12'; Hendry (yellow card) 40'; Sernicola (yellow card) 44'; Ciofani (penalty missed) 89', 89'	Stadium: Stadio Arechi; Attendance: 16,780; Referee: Matteo Marchetti

9 November 2022 14	Fiorentina	2–1	Salernitana	Florence
20:45 CET (UTC+1)	Bonaventura 15'; Jović 81'	Report	Dia 55'; Radovanović (yellow card) 90+4'	Stadium: Stadio Artemio Franchi; Attendance: 27,329; Referee: Federico La Penna

13 November 2022 15	Monza	3–0	Salernitana	Monza
15:00 CET (UTC+1)	Carlos Augusto 24'; Mota 35'; Pessina 76' (pen.)	Report	Candreva (yellow card) 45+1' (yellow-red card) 74'	Stadium: Stadio Brianteo; Attendance: 12,372; Referee: Antonio Giua

4 January 2023 16	Salernitana	1–2	Milan	Salerno
12:30 CET (UTC+1)	Piątek (yellow card) 73'; Bradarić (yellow card) 75'; Bonazzoli 83'; Coulibaly (yellow card) 85'; Daniliuc (yellow card) 90+2'	Report	Leão 10'; Tonali 15'; Giroud (yellow card) 53'	Stadium: Stadio Arechi; Attendance: 29,541; Referee: Francesco Forneau

8 January 2023 17	Salernitana	1–1	Torino	Salerno
12:30 CET (UTC+1)	Candreva (yellow card) 22'; Vilhena 49'; Daniliuc (yellow card) 68'	Report	Linetty (yellow card) 25'; Sanabria 36'; Lukić (yellow card) 51'; Djidji (yellow card) 77'	Stadium: Stadio Arechi; Attendance: 16,300; Referee: Andrea Colombo

15 January 2023 18	Atalanta	8–2	Salernitana	Bergamo
18:00 CET (UTC+1)	Boga 5'; Lookman 20' (pen.), 54'; Scalvini 23'; Koopmeiners (yellow card) 30', (penalty missed) 38', 38'; Højlund 41'; Éderson 61'; Zortea 85'	Report	Dia 10'; Nicolussi 56'	Stadium: Gewiss Stadium; Attendance: 18,499; Referee: Gianluca Aureliano

21 January 2023 19	Salernitana	0–2	Napoli	Salerno
18:00 CET (UTC+1)	Bradarić (yellow card) 75'; Pirola (yellow card) 78'	Report	Kim (yellow card) 44'; Di Lorenzo 45+3'; Osimhen 48'; Ndombele (yellow card) 90+4'	Stadium: Stadio Arechi; Attendance: 18,550; Referee: Daniele Chiffi

27 January 2023 20	Lecce	1–2	Salernitana	Lecce
20:45 CET (UTC+1)	Strefezza 23'; Maleh (yellow card) 53'; Baschirotto (yellow card) 63'	Report	Dia 5'; Vilhena 20'; Coulibaly (yellow card) 40'; Bradarić (yellow card) 43'; Sambia (yellow card) 80'; Nicolussi (yellow card) 90'	Stadium: Stadio Via del mare Attendance: 24,446; Referee: Davide Massa

7 February 2023 21	Salernitana	0–3	Juventus	Salerno
20:45 CET (UTC+1)	Vilhena (yellow card) 23'	Report	Rabiot (yellow card) 16'; Vlahović 26' (pen.), 47'; Kostić 45'	Stadium: Stadio Arechi; Attendance: 26,945; Referee: Antonio Rapuano

13 February 2023 22	Hellas Verona	1–0	Salernitana	Verona
18:30 CET (UTC+1)	Ngonge 31'; Magnani (yellow card) 49'; Verdi (yellow card) 88'	Report	Bronn (yellow card) 21'; Coulibaly (yellow card) 60'; Pirola (yellow card) 69'	Stadium: Stadio Marcantonio Bentegodi; Attendance: 17,832; Referee: Paolo Valeri

19 February 2023 23	Salernitana	0–2	Lazio	Salerno
15:00 CET (UTC+1)	Pirola (yellow card) 55'; Valencia (yellow card) 83'; Bronn (yellow card) 88' (yellow-red card) 89'; Daniliuc (yellow card) 90+1'	Report	Vecino (yellow card) 44'; Immobile 60', 69' (pen.); Luis Alberto (penalty missed) 90'	Stadium: Stadio Arechi; Attendance: 14,860; Referee: Rosario Abisso

26 February 2023 24	Salernitana	3–0	Monza	Salerno
15:00 CET (UTC+1)	Črnigoj (yellow card) 36'; Coulibaly 52'; Kastanos 65', (yellow card) 68'; Candreva 71'	Report	Caldirola (yellow card) 48'; Marí (yellow card) 62'; Donati (yellow card) 78' (yellow-red card) 87'	Stadium: Stadio Arechi; Attendance: 14,247; Referee: Livio Marinelli

5 March 2023 25	Sampdoria	0–0	Salernitana	Genoa
15:00 CET (UTC+1)	Nuytinck (yellow card) 21'; Cuisance (yellow card) 42'; Malagrida (yellow card) 89'	Report	Daniliuc (yellow card) 28'; Maggiore (yellow card) 51'; Piątek (yellow card) 53'; Dia (yellow card) 86'	Stadium: Stadio Luigi Ferraris; Attendance: 20,353; Referee: Davide Massa

13 March 2023 26	Milan	1–1	Salernitana	Milan
20:45 CET (UTC+1)	Giroud 45+1', (yellow card) 59'; Tomori (yellow card) 90+4'	Report	Dia 61', (yellow card) 90+6'; Sambia (yellow card) 85'; Coulibaly (yellow card) 89'	Stadium: San Siro; Attendance: 71,870; Referee: Federico La Penna

18 March 2023 27	Salernitana	2–2	Bologna	Salerno
18:00 CET (UTC+1)	Pirola 7'; Dia 64'	Report	Ferguson 11'; Lykogiannis 73'; Orsolini (yellow card) 76'	Stadium: Stadio Arechi; Attendance: 18,600; Referee: Luca Pairetto

2 April 2023 28	Spezia	1–1	Salernitana	La Spezia
15:00 CEST (UTC+2)	Shomurodov 70'	Report	Caldara 43' (o.g.); Coulibaly (yellow card) 77'	Stadium: Stadio Alberto Picco; Attendance: 10,723; Referee: Daniele Orsato

7 April 2023 29	Salernitana	1–1	Internazionale	Salerno
17:00 CEST (UTC+2)	Coulibaly (yellow card) 38'; Nicolussi (yellow card) 70'; Candreva 90'	Report	Gosens 6'; De Vrij (yellow card) 34'; Gagliardini (yellow card) 89'	Stadium: Stadio Arechi; Attendance: 23,100; Referee: Michael Fabbri

16 April 2023 30	Torino	1–1	Salernitana	Turin
15:00 CEST (UTC+2)	Sanabria 57'	Report	Vilhena 9'; Gyömbér (yellow card) 68'	Stadium: Stadio Olimpico Grande Torino; Attendance: 21,122; Referee: Gianluca Aureliano

22 April 2023 31	Salernitana	3–0	Sassuolo	Salerno
15:00 CEST (UTC+2)	Pirola 9'; Dia 20'; Coulibaly 65'; Bronn (yellow card) 70'	Report	Matheus Henrique (yellow card) 78'; Ruan (yellow card) 80'	Stadium: Stadio Arechi; Attendance: 23,060; Referee: Giacomo Camplone

30 April 2023 32	Napoli	1–1	Salernitana	Naples
15:00 CEST (UTC+2)	Zieliński (yellow card) 55'; Olivera 62', (yellow card) 71'	Report	Daniliuc (yellow card) 74'; Pirola (yellow card) 75'; Dia 84'	Stadium: Stadio Diego Armando Maradona; Attendance: 50,672; Referee: Matteo Marcenaro

3 May 2023 33	Salernitana	3–3	Fiorentina	Salerno
18:30 CEST (UTC+2)	Dia 10', 59', 81' (pen.); Daniliuc (yellow card) 49'; Botheim (yellow card) 51'; Bradarić (yellow card) 84'	Report	González 36'; Mandragora (yellow card) 40'; Castrovilli (yellow card) 43'; Cabral (yellow card) 45'; Martínez Quarta (yellow card) 55'; Ikoné 71'; Biraghi 84'; Duncan (yellow card) 90+4'	Stadium: Stadio Arechi; Attendance: 17,868; Referee: Ivano Pezzuto

8 May 2023 34	Empoli	2–1	Salernitana	Empoli
18:30 CEST (UTC+2)	Cambiaghi 38'; Caputo 63'; Baldanzi (yellow card) 70'; Destro (yellow card) 90+6'	Report	Lovato (yellow card) 28'; Bronn (yellow card) 60'; Piątek 85'	Stadium: Stadio Carlo Castellani; Attendance: 10,760; Referee: Manuel Volpi

13 May 2023 35	Salernitana	1–0	Atalanta	Salerno
15:00 CEST (UTC+2)	Lovato (yellow card) 59'; Coulibaly (yellow card) 76'; Candreva 90+3'	Report	Scalvini (yellow card) 49'; De Roon (yellow card) 60'	Stadium: Stadio Arechi; Attendance: 17,400; Referee: Marco Piccinini

22 May 2023 36	Roma	2–2	Salernitana	Rome
18:30 CEST (UTC+2)	El Shaarawy 47'; Matić 83'; Zalewski (yellow card) 90+4'	Report	Candreva 12'; Dia 54', (yellow card) 90+5'; Gyömbér (yellow card) 69'; Ochoa (yellow card) 85'; Daniliuc (yellow card) 87'	Stadium: Stadio Olimpico; Attendance: 64,286; Referee: Andrea Colombo

27 May 2023 37	Salernitana	3–2	Udinese	Salerno
15:00 CEST (UTC+2)	Vilhena (yellow card) 37'; Kastanos 43', (yellow card) 90+1'; Candreva 57'; Troost-Ekong 90+6', (yellow card) 90+8'	Report	Zeegelaar (yellow card) 4' (yellow-red card) 87', (goal) 25'; Nestorovski 30'; Bijol (yellow card) 71'	Stadium: Stadio Arechi; Attendance: 27,035; Referee: Niccolò Barono

3 June 2023 38	Cremonese	2–0	Salernitana	Cremona
21:00 CEST (UTC+2)	Buonaiuto 26' (pen.); Ghiglione (yellow card) 29'; Tsadjout 88'	Report	Coulibaly (yellow card) 39'; Piątek (yellow card) 87'	Stadium: Stadio Giovanni Zini; Attendance: 10,308; Referee: Daniele Perenzoni

=== Coppa Italia ===
7 August 2022 Round of 64	Salernitana	0–2	Parma	Salerno
21:00 CEST (UTC+2)	Fazio (yellow card) 76'	Report	Camara 59'; Mihăilă 74'; Zagaritis (yellow card) 90+2'	Stadium: Stadio Arechi; Attendance: 10,205; Referee: Ivano Pezzuto
