= Antonio Candreva =

Italian footballer (born 1987)

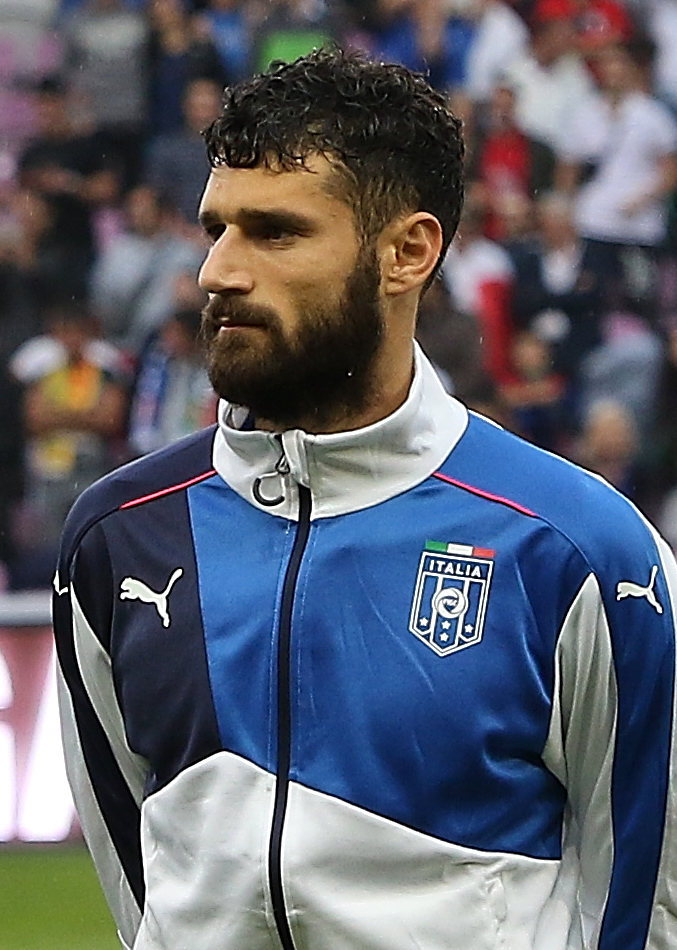
- Candreva with Italy in 2015

Personal information
- Full name: Antonio Candreva
- Date of birth: 28 February 1987 (age 39)
- Place of birth: Rome, Italy
- Height: 1.80 m (5 ft 11 in)
- Positions: Right midfielder; right winger

Youth career
- Lodigiani
- 2003–2004: Ternana

Senior career*
Years	Team	Apps	(Gls)
2004–2007	Ternana	45	(0)
2007–2013	Udinese	3	(0)
2008–2010	→ Livorno (loan)	52	(2)
2010	→ Juventus (loan)	16	(2)
2010–2011	→ Parma (loan)	31	(3)
2011–2012	→ Cesena (loan)	18	(2)
2012–2013	→ Lazio (loan)	50	(9)
2013–2016	Lazio	101	(32)
2016–2021	Inter Milan	124	(12)
2020–2021	→ Sampdoria (loan)	35	(5)
2021–2023	Sampdoria	36	(7)
2022–2023	→ Salernitana (loan)	35	(7)
2023–2024	Salernitana	34	(6)
Total		581	(87)

International career
2004–2005	Italy U18	6	(0)
2005	Italy U19	9	(1)
2005–2008	Italy U20	13	(4)
2008–2009	Italy U21	8	(0)
2009–2018	Italy	54	(7)
Medal record
Men's Football
Representing Italy
FIFA Confederations Cup
Third place	2013 Brazil
- * Club domestic league appearances and goals

Antonio Candreva (Italian pronunciation: [anˈtɔːnjo kanˈdrɛːva]; born 28 February 1987) is an Italian former professional footballer who played as a right midfielder or right winger.

Candreva began his professional club career with Ternana in 2004, where he remained until 2007. He later moved to Udinese, remaining until 2012, but was sent on loan to Livorno, Juventus, Parma, and Cesena during his time with the club. He subsequently transferred to Lazio, where he won the Coppa Italia in his first season with the team. He joined Inter Milan in 2016, and made over 150 appearances across four seasons at the club.

At international level, Candreva represented Italy at the 2008 Summer Olympics, 2013 FIFA Confederations Cup (winning a bronze medal), 2014 FIFA World Cup, and UEFA Euro 2016.

== Early life ==
Candreva was born on 28 February 1987 in Rome. Candreva is of part Arbëreshe descent as his grandfather, on his father's side, is from the Arbëreshë village of Falconara Albanese in Cosenza.

== Club career ==
=== Ternana ===
Candreva started playing for the youth teams at local club Lodigiani, then transferred to Serie C1 team Ternana in 2003 and played several games for the first team when they were promoted to Serie B for the 2004–05 season. After Ternana were relegated back to Serie C1 the following season, he became a regular in the side and attracted the interest of several Serie A clubs.

=== Udinese ===
In June 2007, Candreva was then signed by Serie A club Udinese and played for their Primavera (U-20) team as an overage player. He made his Serie A debut on 27 January 2008 against Inter, and managed several appearances for the first team throughout the season.

==== Loans to Livorno ====
The 21-year-old was successively loaned out to Serie B outfit Livorno for the 2008–09 season. Together with Alessandro Diamanti, he helped the Tuscan side regain promotion to Serie A as playoff winners. After a successful first season, the loan deal between Udinese and Livorno was subsequently extended to one more year, thus giving Candreva the opportunity to play a full season as a regular in the Italian top flight.

==== Loans to Juventus ====
On 20 January 2010, it was confirmed Serie A giants Juventus had signed Candreva on loan for the rest of the season, for €500,000, with Juventus having an option to buy half of his contract from Udinese at the end of the season. He scored his first Serie A goal, the winner against Bologna, less than ten minutes after coming on as a substitute for Diego. A few days later, he made his debut in European competitions in the Europa League, in the second leg of the club's round of 32 fixture against Ajax, when he came on as a late substitute for captain Alessandro Del Piero.

After the end of the 2009–10 season, Juventus opted not to exercise their right to sign the player permanently and Candreva returned to Udinese in the summer.

==== Loan to Parma ====
On 31 August 2010, Candreva signed for Serie A side Parma on a one-year loan deal, for €500,000. Parma had the option to purchase Candreva in a co-ownership deal, but declined to do so.

==== Loan to Cesena ====
On 21 July 2011, Candreva signed for Serie A side Cesena on an initial one-year loan deal. It cost Cesena €300,000.

=== Lazio ===
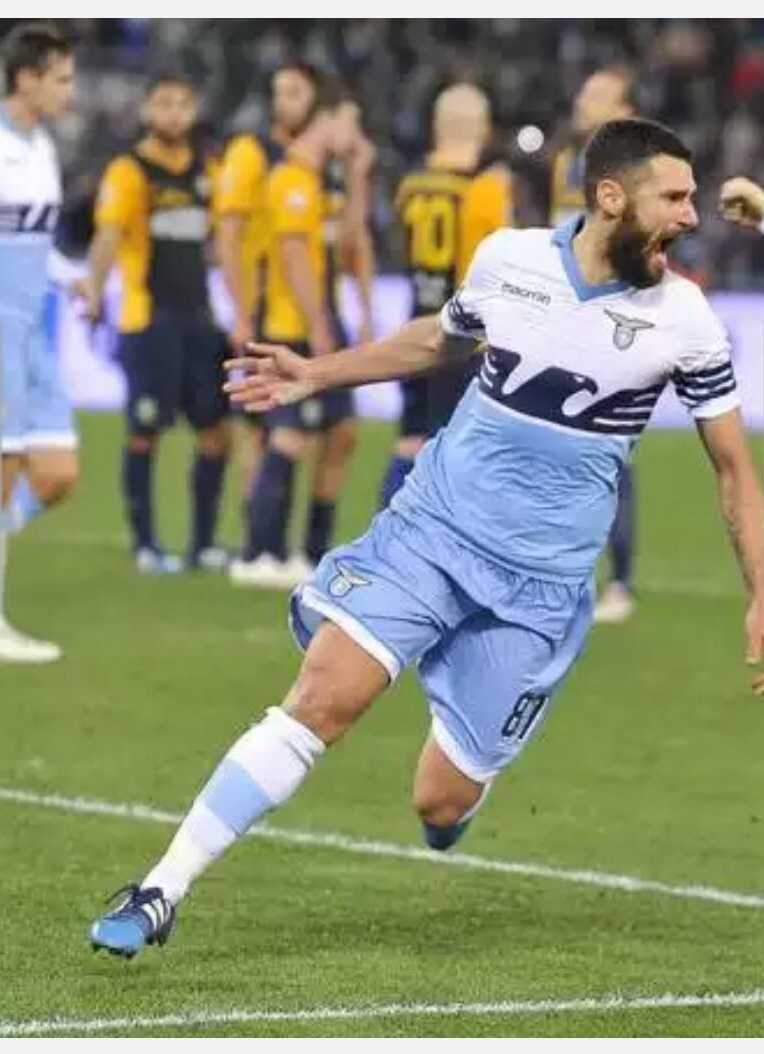
Candreva celebrating a goal for Lazio in March 2015

On the last day of the January 2012 transfer window, he moved to Lazio on a free loan deal, in return Simone Del Nero from Lazio went for a free loan to Cesena. On 7 April 2012, Candreva scored his first goal for Lazio against Napoli in the 2011–12 season, in a 3–1 home victory.

On 18 July 2012, the temporary deal was renewed for free with an option to buy.

With the hiring of Lazio's new coach Vladimir Petković in the 2012–13 season, Candreva finally won over fans and coaching staff, continuously being one of Lazio's best performers. On 2 September 2012, Candreva scored his first goal of the 2012–2013 season in a 3–0 victory against Palermo, following Miroslav Klose's 2 goals.

On 26 May 2013, he won the first trophy of his career, the 2012–13 Coppa Italia title, following a 1–0 victory in a historic derby match against cross-city rivals Roma. Candreva assisted Senad Lulić's match-winning goal in the 71st minute of the 2013 Coppa Italia Final.

In June 2013, Lazio exercised the option to buy Candreva in a co-ownership deal for €1.7 million on a 4-year contract. In October 2013, Candreva added one more year to his current contract. On 14 June 2014 Lazio bought Candreva outright for another €4 million, so in total Lazio paid Udinese €5.7 million.

=== Inter Milan ===
On 3 August 2016, Candreva joined Inter Milan on a four-year deal for a €22 million fee plus reported bonuses. On 13 August, Candreva made his unofficial debut for the club in an International Champions Cup preseason match against Celtic; he came on the pitch in the 60th minute, and scored his first goal with the club ten minutes later in a 2–0 win. On 20 October, he scored his first Europa League goal with the club, the only goal of the match, for a 1–0 home win over Southampton. He scored his first league goal with the club on 20 November, in a 2–2 draw with Milan rivals.

Candreva made his 100th Serie A appearance for Inter on 29 October 2019 in the 2–1 away win over Brescia in 2019–20 Serie A.

=== Sampdoria ===
On 25 September 2020, Candreva moved to Sampdoria on loan with an obligation to make the deal permanent.

=== Salernitana ===
On 13 August 2022, Candreva joined Serie A club Salernitana on a one-year loan deal with a conditional obligation to buy. Salernitana became the ninth club he has played for in this division. The conditions of the loan deal were fulfilled and the transfer became permanent at the end of the 2022–23 season.

=== Retirement ===
On 18 March 2025, after almost a year of inactivity, Candreva announced his decision to retire from football.

== International career ==
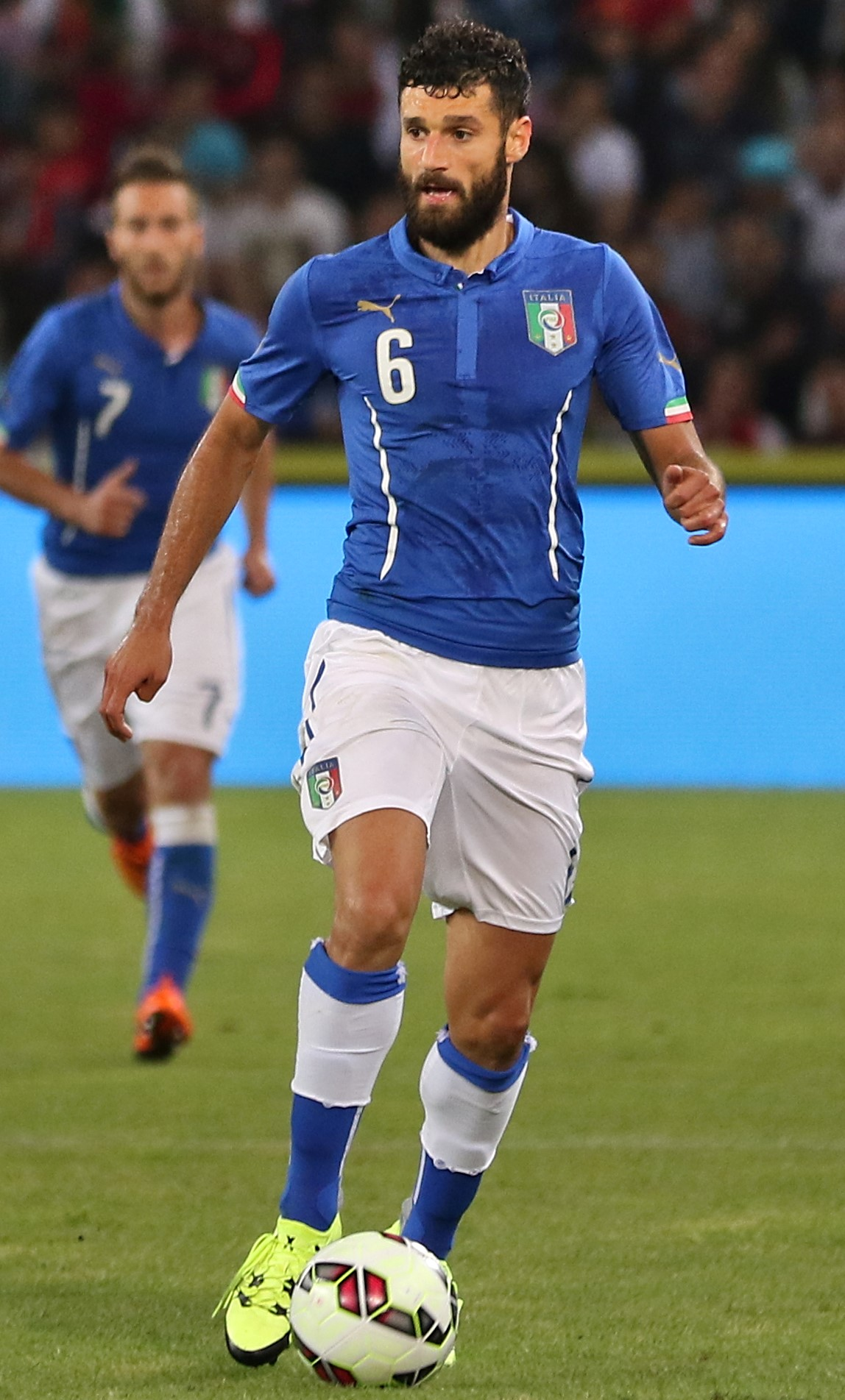
Candreva in action for Italy in a friendly match against Portugal in June 2015

Candreva played for Italy since the U-18 level, making his debut in October 2004. After taking part in his nation's victorious campaign in the 2008 Toulon Tournament, Candreva was named in reserve list for the upcoming Olympics; he was eventually called up as an injury replacement for Tommaso Rocchi. He made his U-21 debut on 9 September 2008 in the 2009 Under-21 European Championship qualifier against Croatia. In May, he was called up to the 23-man squad for 2009 Under-21 European Championships, initially as second choice, and made several substitute appearances as Italy reached the semi-finals of the tournament, in which he started, losing 1–0 to eventual champions Germany.

On 14 November 2009, Candreva made his senior national team debut in a friendly match against the Netherlands, which ended in a 0–0 draw.

In early May, Candreva was called up for the training camp prior to the 2010 FIFA World Cup; he was included by manager Marcello Lippi in the 30-man preliminary squad announced on 11 May 2010, but was dropped from the 28-man provisional team a week later.

In October 2012, Antonio Candreva was recalled to the Italy national team by manager Cesare Prandelli to play in a double fixture for the 2014 FIFA World Cup qualification. Candreva earned a spot in the national team following his top performances for Lazio playing in both qualifiers.

In June 2013, Candreva was selected by Prandelli to play in the 2013 FIFA Confederations Cup. In the knockout stages of the tournament knockout stage, during the semi-final against Spain national football team the match had to be decided by a penalty shoot-out. Candreva stepped up to take the first penalty and scored past Iker Casillas by chipping the ball, in a way that recalled the famous penalty scored by Czech legend Antonín Panenka in the UEFA Euro 1976 Final. Italy finished third after defeating Uruguay on penalties in the bronze medal match.

On 1 June 2014, Candreva was selected in Italy's 23-man squad for the 2014 FIFA World Cup. In Italy's opening match of the tournament in Manaus on 14 June, he assisted Mario Balotelli's match-winning goal in a 2–1 defeat of England. He was also involved in Claudio Marchisio's opening goal, as he played a short corner to Marco Verratti, who then passed the ball out wide towards Andrea Pirlo, who drew his marker with him; Pirlo let the ball pass in between his legs to Marchisio, leaving him with space to score with a low drive from outside the area. Italy lost their next two matches, however, and finished in third place in their group, and were eliminated in the first round for a second consecutive World Cup.

On 16 November 2014, Candreva scored his first international goal in a 1–1 Euro 2016 qualifier draw against Croatia. On 12 June 2015, he scored Italy's equalising goal, from a Panenka style penalty, in the 36th minute of a 1–1 Euro 2016 qualifier away draw against Croatia in an empty Split stadium. On 10 October 2015, he assisted Stephan El Shaarawy's match-winning goal in Italy's 3–1 away win over Azerbaijan in a European qualifying match; the win guaranteed Italy a place at Euro 2016.

On 31 May 2016, he was named to Antonio Conte's 23-man Italy squad for Euro 2016. On 13 June he made his tournament debut and set up Graziano Pellè's goal in stoppage time in a 2–0 win over Belgium in the opening group match of Euro 2016. After being ruled out of Italy's final group match, a 1–0 defeat to Ireland, due to an injury sustained in Italy's 1–0 victory over Sweden, on 25 June, it was confirmed that Candreva would also miss out on the round of 16 match up with Spain on 27 June due to a thigh problem – and subsequently the 6–5 penalty shoot-out loss to Germany in the quarter final on 2 July.

== Style of play ==
Naturally right-footed, Candreva could be deployed in several midfield positions due to his versatility, although he usually played either in a central role as an attacking midfielder or more frequently as a traditional winger on the right side of the pitch; a former forward, he was also capable of playing on the left, and was at times used as a wing-back or full-back, as a second striker, as a central or box-to-box midfielder, as a mezzala, or even in a deeper role in front of the back-line, due to his defensive work-rate and tactical awareness. He was also deployed as a false attacking midfielder on occasion.

Candreva was well known for his pace, and stamina, which enabled him to cover the flank, as well as his eye for goal. He was known for his ability to get forward, and possessed a powerful long-range shot with both feet, as well as being a precise free kick and penalty kick taker. He was also gifted with vision and creativity, along with accurate passing, good distribution, and his excellent crossing ability and set-piece delivery, which enabled him to create chances and provide several assists for teammates. In addition to these attributes, Candreva possessed good technical ability, ball control and dribbling skills, which enabled him to get past opposing defenders and both exploit and create space for his team.

== Career statistics ==
=== Club ===
Appearances and goals by club, season and competition
Club	Season	League			Coppa Italia		Europe		Other		Total	
Club	Season	Division	Apps	Goals	Apps	Goals	Apps	Goals	Apps	Goals	Apps	Goals
Ternana	2005–06	Serie B	29	0	0	0	—		—		29	0
Ternana	2006–07	Serie C1	16	0	0	0	—		—		16	0
Ternana	Total		45	0	0	0	—		—		45	0
Udinese	2007–08	Serie A	3	0	0	0	—		—		3	0
Livorno (loan)	2008–09	Serie B	33	2	0	0	—		—		33	2
Livorno (loan)	2009–10	Serie A	19	0	3	0	—		—		22	0
Livorno (loan)	Total		52	2	3	0	—		—		55	2
Juventus (loan)	2009–10	Serie A	16	2	1	0	3 (Note: All appearances in UEFA Europa League)	0	—		20	2
Parma (loan)	2010–11	Serie A	31	3	2	0	—		—		33	3
Cesena (loan)	2011–12	Serie A	18	2	3	0	—		—		21	2
Lazio	2011–12	Serie A	15	3	—		2	0	—		17	3
Lazio	2012–13	Serie A	35	6	3	0	11	1	—		49	7
Lazio	2013–14	Serie A	37	12	1	0	5	0	1 (Note: Appearance in Supercoppa Italiana)	0	44	12
Lazio	2014–15	Serie A	34	10	4	1	—		—		38	11
Lazio	2015–16	Serie A	30	10	2	0	11 (Note: Two appearances in UEFA Champions League, nine appearances and two goals in UEFA Europa League)	2	1	0	44	12
Lazio	Total		151	41	10	1	29	3	2	0	192	45
Inter Milan	2016–17	Serie A	38	6	2	1	5	1	—		45	8
Inter Milan	2017–18	Serie A	36	0	1	0	—		—		37	0
Inter Milan	2018–19	Serie A	18	1	2	2	9 (Note: Five appearances in UEFA Champions League, four appearances in UEFA Europa League)	0	—		29	3
Inter Milan	2019–20	Serie A	32	5	2	1	6 (Note: Five appearances and one goal in UEFA Champions League, one appearance in UEFA Europa League)	1	—		40	7
Inter Milan	Total		124	12	7	4	19	2	—		151	18
Sampdoria (loan)	2020–21	Serie A	35	5	1	0	—		—		36	5
Sampdoria	2021–22	Serie A	36	7	3	0	—		—		39	7
Sampdoria	2022–23	Serie A	0	0	1	0	—		—		1	0
Sampdoria	Total		71	12	5	0	—		—		76	12
Salernitana (loan)	2022–23	Serie A	35	7	0	0	—		—		35	7
Salernitana	2023–24	Serie A	34	6	1	1	—		—		35	7
Salernitana	Total		69	13	1	1	—		—		70	14
Career total			581	87	32	6	52	5	2	0	666	98

=== International ===
Appearances and goals by national team and year
National team	Year	Apps	Goals
Italy	2009	2	0
Italy	2010	—	
Italy	2011	—	
Italy	2012	3	0
Italy	2013	13	0
Italy	2014	8	1
Italy	2015	9	2
Italy	2016	9	3
Italy	2017	8	1
Italy	2018	2	0
Total		54	7

Scores and results list Italy's goal tally first, score column indicates score after each Candreva goal.

List of international goals scored by Antonio Candreva
No.	Date	Venue	Opponent	Score	Result	Competition
1	16 November 2014	San Siro, Milan, Italy	Croatia	1–0	1–1	UEFA Euro 2016 qualifying
2	12 June 2015	Stadion Poljud, Split, Croatia	Croatia	1–1	1–1	UEFA Euro 2016 qualifying
3	13 November 2015	King Baudouin Stadium, Brussels, Belgium	Belgium	1–0	1–3	Friendly
4	6 June 2016	Stadio Marc'Antonio Bentegodi, Verona, Italy	Finland	1–0	2–0	Friendly
5	5 September 2016	Sammy Ofer Stadium, Haifa, Israel	Israel	2–0	3–1	2018 FIFA World Cup qualification
6	12 November 2016	Rheinpark Stadion, Vaduz, Liechtenstein	Liechtenstein	3–0	4–0	2018 FIFA World Cup qualification
7	9 October 2017	Loro Boriçi Stadium, Shkodër, Albania	Albania	1–0	1–0	2018 FIFA World Cup qualification

== Honours ==
Lazio

- Coppa Italia: 2012–13

Inter Milan

- UEFA Europa League runner-up: 2019–20

Italy U21

- Toulon Tournament: 2008

Italy

- FIFA Confederations Cup third place: 2013

Individual

- Serie A Goal of the Month: October 2021, January 2024
