= Domagoj Bradarić =

Croatian footballer (born 1999)

Personal information
- Date of birth: 10 December 1999 (age 26)
- Place of birth: Split, Croatia
- Height: 1.78 m (5 ft 10 in)
- Positions: Left-back; wing-back

Team information
- Current team: Hellas Verona
- Number: 12

Youth career
- 2007–2017: Hajduk Split

Senior career*
Years	Team	Apps	(Gls)
2017–2018	Hajduk Split II	35	(5)
2018–2019	Hajduk Split	22	(0)
2019–2022	Lille	59	(1)
2022–2025	Salernitana	67	(0)
2024–2025	→ Hellas Verona (loan)	28	(1)
2025–	Hellas Verona	29	(0)

International career^{‡}
2015	Croatia U16	1	(0)
2017	Croatia U18	1	(0)
2017	Croatia U19	1	(0)
2018–2021	Croatia U21	14	(1)
2020–	Croatia	5	(0)
- * Club domestic league appearances and goals as of 25 May 2026 ‡ National team caps and goals as of 12 October 2025

Domagoj Bradarić (Croatian pronunciation: [dômaɡoj brǎdaritɕ]; born 10 December 1999) is a Croatian professional footballer who plays as a left-back or wing-back for Serie B club Hellas Verona and the Croatia national team.

== Club career ==
=== Hajduk Split ===
Born in Split, Bradarić joined the youth team of Hajduk Split in 2007. Ahead of the 2017–18 season, he was promoted to the reserves.

On 18 June 2018, Bradarić was promoted to the senior team and signed his first professional contract. On 15 September, he made his first team debut, coming on as a substitute for Steliano Filip in a 3–1 victory against Rudeš. After playing the next six matches, he injured himself, only to return to play against Rudeš in December, and providing an assist to Jairo de Macedo da Silva. At the end of the season, his inaugural in the first team at Hajduk, Bradarić was named in the team of the season.

He made his final appearance for Hajduk on 9 July 2019 in a Europa League qualifying away 2–0 victory against Gżira United.

=== Playing abroad ===
On 19 July, Bradarić signed a five-year contract with Lille OSC. The transfer fee between the two sides was reported as €6.5 million plus €2 million in potential bonuses and 10% of a future transfer fee. He made his league debut in a 2–1 home victory against Nantes on 18 August, as well as Champions League debut on 17 September in a 3–0 away defeat against Ajax. On 21 February 2021, Bradarić scored his debut goal for Lille in a 4–1 victory against Lorient.

On 15 July 2022, Bradarić signed a four-year contract with Italian club Salernitana. On 30 August 2024, he joined Hellas Verona on loan with an option to buy. After one season, Bradarić signed for the club permanently until 30 June 2028.

== International career ==
On 5 November 2018, Bradarić was called up to the Croatian under-21 national team for a friendly match against France. On 7 June 2019, he was named in Nenad Gračan's 23-man squad for UEFA Under-21 Euro 2019, where he made two appearances as Croatia finished at the bottom of the group.

On 21 September 2020, senior team coach Zlatko Dalić called Bradarić up for October fixtures against Switzerland, Sweden and France. On 7 October, he made his national team debut in a friendly 2–1 victory over Switzerland. Despite being a full-back, Bradarić started as a winger in his debut and provided Josip Brekalo with an assist for Croatia's equalizer.

On 9 March 2021, Bradarić was named in Igor Bišćan's 23-man squad for the group stage of UEFA Under-21 Euro 2021. He played every minute of the group stage and scored an injury time goal in the final match, a 2–1 defeat against England, which turned out to be decisive as Croatia progressed to the knockout phase due to a better goal difference. On 17 May, Bradarić was named in Bišćan's 23-man squad for the knockout stage of the tournament, as well as Dalić's 26-man squad for UEFA Euro 2020. However, he got no playing time at the latter tournament, being behind Joško Gvardiol and Borna Barišić in the pecking order.

== Personal life ==
Bradarić's parents are divorced. His father, Ante Bradarić, born and rise in Split Croatia, but lives in Germany. His mother, Natalija Tabak, is a Bosnian Croat from Eminovo Selo near Tomislavgrad, but lives in Strožanac near Podstrana with Bradarić's younger brother Luka. She also works as Bradarić's agent.

He listed Marcelo and Jordi Alba as his football role models.

== Career statistics ==
=== Club ===
As of match played 3 October 2025

Appearances and goals by club, season and competition
Club	Season	League			National cup (Note: Includes Croatian Cup, Coupe de France, Coppa Italia)		League cup (Note: Includes Coupe de la Ligue)		Europe		Other		Total	
Club	Season	Division	Apps	Goals	Apps	Goals	Apps	Goals	Apps	Goals	Apps	Goals	Apps	Goals
Hajduk Split II	2017–18	Druga HNL	28	4	—		—		—		—		28	4
Hajduk Split II	2018–19	Druga HNL	7	1	—		—		—		—		7	1
Hajduk Split II	Total		35	5	—		—		—		—		35	5
Hajduk Split	2018–19	Prva HNL	22	0	2	0	—		0	0	—		24	0
Hajduk Split	2019–20	Prva HNL	—		—		—		1 (Note: Appearance(s) in UEFA Europa League)	0	—		1	0
Hajduk Split	Total		22	0	2	0	—		1	0	—		25	0
Lille	2019–20	Ligue 1	18	0	1	0	2	0	3 (Note: Appearance(s) in UEFA Champions League)	0	—		24	0
Lille	2020–21	Ligue 1	26	1	3	0	—		7	0	—		36	1
Lille	2021–22	Ligue 1	15	0	0	0	—		1	0	1 (Note: Appearance in Trophée des Champions)	0	17	0
Lille	Total		59	1	4	0	2	0	11	0	1	0	77	1
Salernitana	2022–23	Serie A	31	0	0	0	—		—		—		31	0
Salernitana	2023–24	Serie A	34	0	3	0	—		—		—		37	0
Salernitana	2024–25	Serie B	2	0	1	0	—		—		—		37	0
Salernitana	Total		67	0	4	0	—		—		—		71	0
Hellas Verona (loan)	2024–25	Serie A	28	1	—		—		—		—		28	1
Hellas Verona	2025–26	Serie A	6	0	1	1	—		—		—		7	1
Hellas Verona	Verona total		34	1	1	1	—		—		—		35	2
Career total			217	7	11	1	2	0	12	0	1	0	243	8

=== International ===
As of match played 12 October 2025

Appearances and goals by national team and year
National team	Year	Apps	Goals
Croatia	2020	4	0
Croatia	2025	1	0
Total		5	0

== Honours ==
Lille

- Ligue 1: 2020–21
- Trophée des Champions: 2021
