= Lorenzo Pirola =

Italian footballer (born 2002)

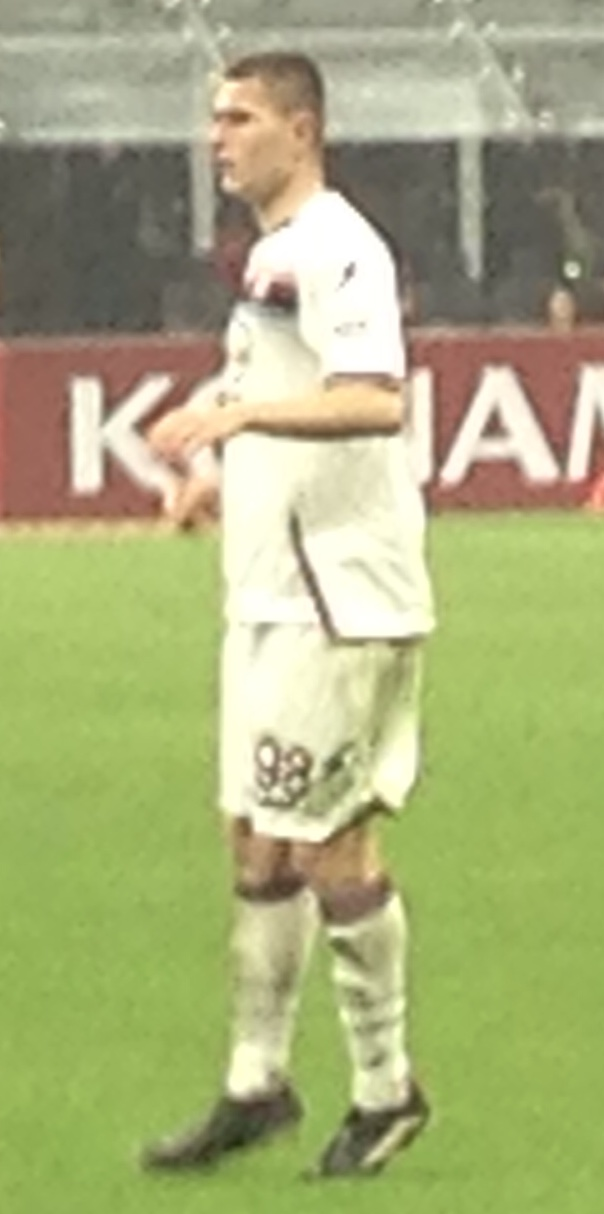
- Lorenzo Pirola

Personal information
- Full name: Lorenzo Pirola
- Date of birth: 20 February 2002 (age 24)
- Place of birth: Carate Brianza, Italy
- Height: 1.85 m (6 ft 1 in)
- Position: Centre-back

Team information
- Current team: Olympiacos
- Number: 5

Youth career
- 2008–2009: Casatese
- 2009–2013: Missaglia
- 2013–2014: COSOV
- 2014–2015: Luciano Manara
- 2015–2020: Inter Milan

Senior career*
Years	Team	Apps	(Gls)
2020–2023	Inter Milan	1	(0)
2020–2022	→ Monza (loan)	22	(0)
2022–2023	→ Salernitana (loan)	26	(2)
2023–2024	Salernitana	27	(1)
2024–	Olympiacos	54	(1)

International career^{‡}
2017	Italy U15	9	(1)
2018	Italy U16	5	(0)
2017–2019	Italy U17	21	(2)
2019	Italy U18	7	(1)
2020–2025	Italy U21	26	(3)
- * Club domestic league appearances and goals as of 22 November 2026 ‡ National team caps and goals as of 22 June 2025

Lorenzo Pirola (born 20 February 2002) is an Italian professional footballer who plays as a centre-back for Super League Greece club Olympiacos.

== Club career ==
=== Inter Milan ===
Pirola joined the youth academy of Inter Milan in 2015. Pirola made his senior debut with Inter in a 4–0 Serie A win over SPAL on 16 July 2020.

==== Loan to Monza ====
On 5 October 2020, Pirola moved to newly promoted Serie B side Monza on a one-year loan. He made his debut on 27 October 2020, in a Coppa Italia third round match against Pordenone; Monza won on penalties, with Pirola playing the whole 120 minutes. Pirola played his first Serie B match on 22 December, in a 2–0 win over Ascoli at home.

On 14 July 2021, Pirola re-joined Monza on another one-year loan, with an option to buy for Monza and a counter-option for Inter.

=== Salernitana ===
Pirola joined Salernitana in the Serie A on a one-year loan, with an option to buy and a counter-option in favour of Inter. At the end of the season Salernitana triggered the option to buy, making the transfer permanent.

=== Olympiacos ===
Pirola joined Olympiacos in the Greek Super League on a three-year contract for a €3 million fee.

== International career ==
Pirola is a youth international for Italy. He represented the Italy U17s at the 2019 UEFA European Under-17 Championship, where they came in second.

On 13 October 2020, he made his debut with Italy U21, playing as a starter in a qualifying match won 2–0 against the Republic of Ireland in Pisa.

== Career statistics ==
As of match played 22 December 2025

Appearances and goals by club, season and competition
Club	Season	League			National cup (Note: Includes Coppa Italia, Greek Football Cup)		Continental		Other		Total	
Club	Season	Division	Apps	Goals	Apps	Goals	Apps	Goals	Apps	Goals	Apps	Goals
Inter Milan	2019–20	Serie A	1	0	0	0	0	0	—		1	0
Inter Milan	2020–21	Serie A	—		—		—		—		0	0
Inter Milan	2021–22	Serie A	—		—		—		—		0	0
Inter Milan	Total		1	0	0	0	0	0	0	0	1	0
Monza (loan)	2020–21	Serie B	12	0	2	0	—		2 (Note: Appearances in Serie B promotion play-offs)	0	16	0
Monza (loan)	2021–22	Serie B	10	0	0	0	—		4	0	14	0
Monza (loan)	Total		22	0	2	0	0	0	6	0	30	0
Salernitana (loan)	2022–23	Serie A	26	2	1	0	—		—		27	2
Salernitana	2023–24	Serie A	27	1	2	0	—		—		29	1
Salernitana	Total		53	3	3	0	0	0	0	0	56	3
Olympiacos	2024–25	Super League Greece	21	0	4	0	8 (Note: Appearances in UEFA Europa League)	0	—		33	0
Olympiacos	2025–26	Super League Greece	23	1	0	0	10 (Note: Appearances in UEFA Champions League)	0	—		33	1
Olympiacos	2026–27	Super League Greece	2	0	0	0	2	0	—		4	0
Olympiacos	Total		46	1	4	0	20	0	—		70	1
Career total			122	4	9	0	20	0	9	0	157	4

== Honours ==
Inter Milan

- UEFA Europa League runner-up: 2019–20

Olympiacos

- Super League Greece: 2024–25
- Greek Football Cup: 2024–25
- Greek Super Cup: 2025

Italy U17

- UEFA European Under-17 Championship runner-up: 2019

Individual

- UEFA European Under-17 Championship Team of the Tournament: 2019
