= Norbert Gyömbér =

Slovak footballer (born 1992)

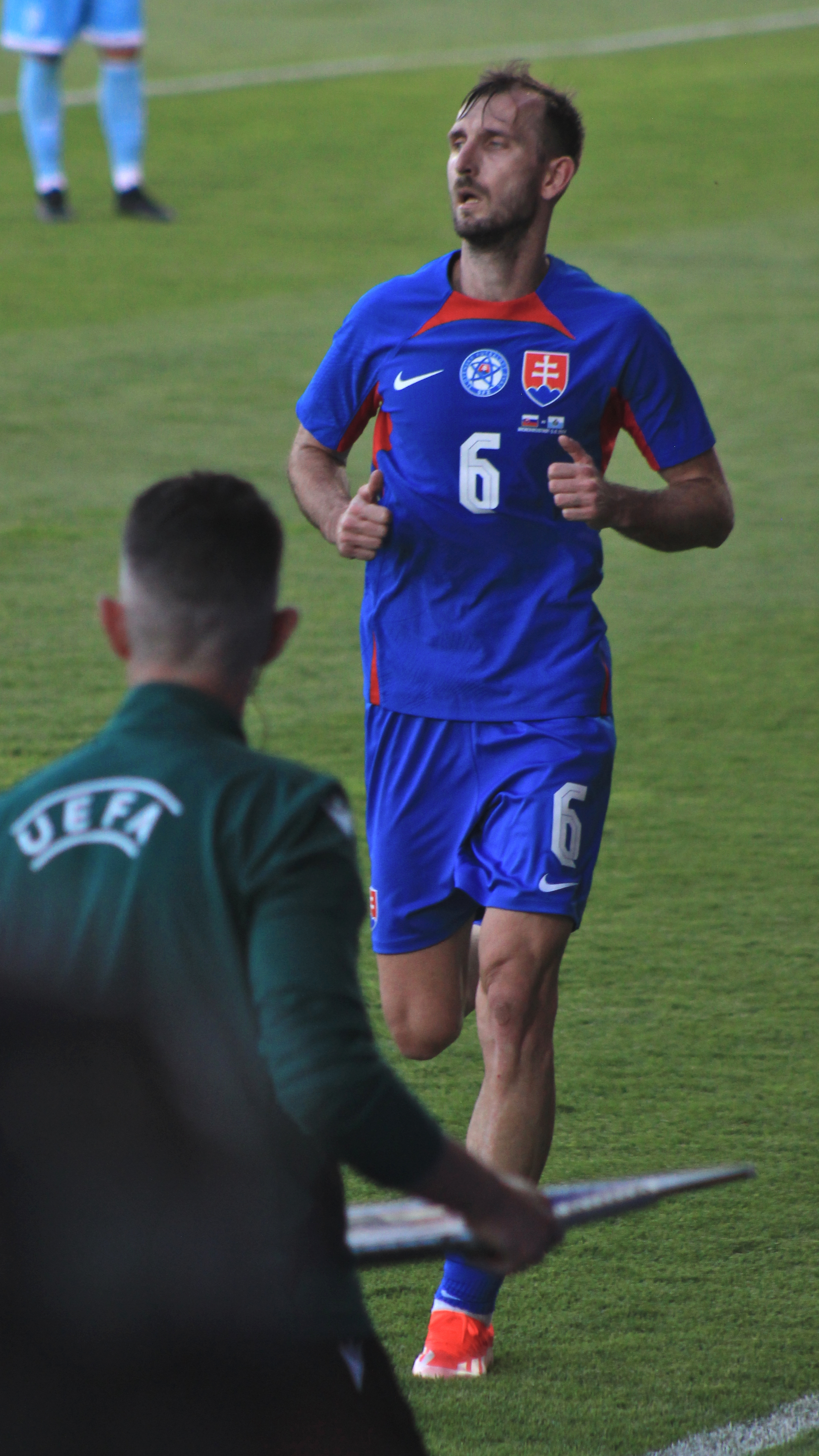
- Gyömbér with Slovakia in 2024

Personal information
- Date of birth: 3 July 1992 (age 34)
- Place of birth: Revúca, Czechoslovakia
- Height: 1.89 m (6 ft 2 in)
- Positions: Centre back; defensive midfielder

Team information
- Current team: Levadiakos
- Number: 5

Youth career
- 1997–2006: MFK Revúca
- 2006–2011: Dukla Banská Bystrica

Senior career*
Years	Team	Apps	(Gls)
2011–2013	Dukla Banská Bystrica	44	(0)
2013–2015	Catania	26	(1)
2015–2018	Roma	6	(0)
2016–2017	→ Pescara (loan)	10	(0)
2017	→ Terek Grozny (loan)	7	(0)
2017–2018	→ Bari (loan)	28	(1)
2018–2020	Perugia	54	(1)
2020–2024	Salernitana	115	(0)
2024–2026	Al-Kholood	61	(1)
2026–	Levadiakos	0	(0)

International career^{‡}
2011	Slovakia U19	4	(0)
2012–2013	Slovakia U21	9	(0)
2014–	Slovakia	55	(0)
- * Club domestic league appearances and goals as of 21:33, 6 November 2025 (UTC) ‡ National team caps and goals as of 22:04, 17 November 2025 (UTC)

Norbert Gyömbér (Slovak pronunciation: [ˈnɔrberd ˈɟembeːr], Hungarian: [ˈɟømbeːr ˈnorbɛrd] Gyömbér Norbert; born 3 July 1992) is a Slovak professional footballer who plays as a centre-back or defensive midfielder for Super League Greece club Levadiakos and the Slovakia national team.

== Club career ==
=== Dukla Banská Bystrica ===
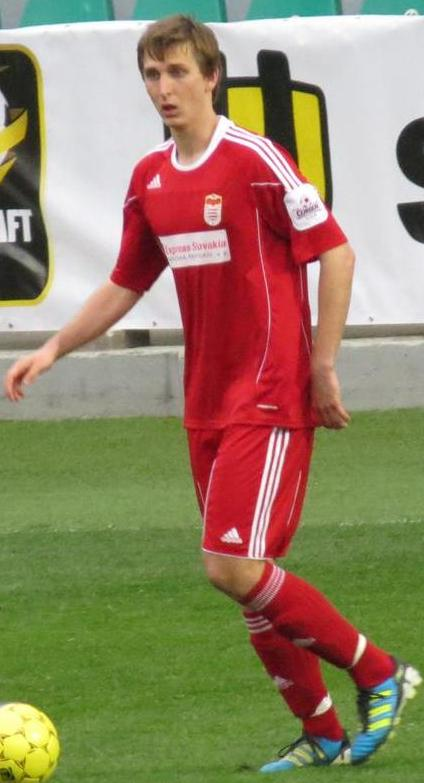
Gyömbér with Banská Bystrica in 2012

Born in Revúca, Gyömbér started playing football with club MFK Revúca, before moving to the youth team of Corgoň Liga club FK Dukla Banská Bystrica in 2006. Norbert made his professional debut with Dukla Banská Bystrica on 1 October 2011 in a league match against MFK Ružomberok. On 25 May 2012, Gyömbér was voted by Dukla Banská Bystrica's fans as player of the season, despite starting in just 18 league matches. He was also named Revelation of the 2011–12 Corgoň Liga's season in July 2012, after his successful first season with FK Dukla Banská Bystrica.

=== Catania ===
Calcio Catania officially agreed to the permanent transfer of midfielder Norbert Gyömbér from Dukla Banská Bystrica during the 2013 January transfer window, but the transfer was not officially be completed until 1 July 2013. The 20-year-old footballer signed a 4.5-year contract at the Stadio Angelo Massimino, but finished the 2012–13 season with the top-flight Slovak side.

=== Roma ===
On 18 August 2015, Gyömbér joined Roma on a one-year loan, in which the signing was made permanent on 21 June 2016 for €1.5 million.

=== Pescara ===
On 15 August 2016, Gyömbér joined Pescara on a season-long loan. He first appeared in a Cup match against Frosinone in August, however, after only 5 games, he fractured his tibula in a 49th minute of a match against Lazio in September.

Although between December 2016 and February 2017 he appeared in 6 of Pescara's 10 matches (out of 2 due to a minor injury), rumours have surfaced about disagreements with some of his teammates and consequently, he was removed from the squad by club's disciplinary action in mid-February. However, according to Gyömbér, this rumour was "not true at all" and the real cause were disagreements with the coach of Pescara at the time, Massimo Oddo, who shortly after replaced by Zdeněk Zeman after a series of unsuccessful results, which Gyömbér claims to be one of the reasons for tensions. He revealed these claims in an interview on 21 March 2017, in a national team camp in Senec, Slovakia, prior to the FIFA World Cup qualifier against Malta.

=== Terek Grozny ===
On 16 February 2017, he joined the Russian Premier League club FC Terek Grozny on loan until the end of 2016–17 season.

=== Perugia ===
On 14 August 2018, he signed a three-year contract with Serie B club Perugia.

=== Salernitana ===
On 12 September 2020, he joined Salernitana on a three-year contract. He left Salernitana on 1 July 2024 by mutual consent.

== International career ==
On 5 March 2014, Gyömbér debuted for the Slovak senior squad of the in a friendly match against Israel. He was selected in Slovakia's squad for UEFA Euro 2016 and made his first appearance at the tournament as a substitute for Viktor Pečovský in the team's final Group B match – a 0–0 draw with England. In Slovakia's round of 16 loss against Germany, he started at left-back and played 84 minutes before being substituted for Kornel Saláta.

After the arrival of the Czech native Pavel Hapal, Gyömbér lost his spot in the national team as early as November 2018, failing to regain it in March 2019. He managed to make a national team comeback in October 2019 for a qualifier against Wales, when it was required to fill the role of a second centre back, as Denis Vavro had suffered a yellow card suspension. He played for the national team after over a year and his gameplay was seen generally positively, mainly for his uncompromising play, as he was tackled angrily on numerous occasions. However, his gameplay caused him to be sanctioned with two yellow cards.

In 2021 and 2022, Gyömbér only appeared in the national team on two occasions in the unsuccessful UEFA Nations League campaign. After the arrival of Francesco Calzona, Gyömbér was first nominated in March 2023 to kick-off UEFA Euro 2024 qualifying short after a three-month injury-caused absence from club football.

Gyömbér was a member of Slovakia's squad for UEFA Euro 2024, making substitute appearances against Romania in the group stage and England in the round of 16.

== Career statistics ==
=== Club ===
As of match played 6 November 2025

Appearances and goals by club, season and competition
Club	Season	League			National cup		Total	
Club	Season	Division	Apps	Goals	Apps	Goals	Apps	Goals
Dukla Banská	2011–12	Slovak Super Liga	18	0	3	0	21	0
Dukla Banská	2012–13	Slovak Super Liga	26	0	3	0	29	0
Dukla Banská	Total		44	0	6	0	50	0
Catania	2013–14	Serie A	18	1	1	0	19	1
Catania	2014–15	Serie B	8	0	1	0	9	0
Catania	2015–16	Lega Pro	0	0	1	0	1	0
Catania	Total		26	1	3	0	29	1
Roma	2015–16	Serie A	6	0	0	0	6	0
Pescara (loan)	2016–17	Serie A	10	0	2	0	12	0
Terek Grozny (loan)	2016–17	Russian Premier League	7	0	0	0	7	0
Bari (loan)	2017–18	Serie B	29	1	0	0	29	1
Perugia	2018–19	Serie B	31	1	0	0	31	1
Perugia	2019–20	Serie B	26	0	4	0	30	0
Perugia	Total		57	1	4	0	61	1
Salernitana	2020–21	Serie B	35	0	2	0	37	0
Salernitana	2021–22	Serie A	31	0	2	0	33	0
Salernitana	2022–23	Serie A	27	0	1	0	28	0
Salernitana	2023–24	Serie A	22	0	3	0	25	0
Salernitana	Total		115	0	8	0	123	0
Al-Kholood	2024–25	Saudi Pro League	33	0	1	0	34	0
Al-Kholood	2025–26	Saudi Pro League	8	0	2	0	10	0
Al-Kholood	Total		41	0	3	0	44	0
Career total			334	3	26	0	360	3

=== International ===
As of match played 17 November 2025

Appearances and goals by national team and year
National team	Year	Apps	Goals
Slovakia	2014	7	0
Slovakia	2015	5	0
Slovakia	2016	4	0
Slovakia	2017	4	0
Slovakia	2018	1	0
Slovakia	2019	2	0
Slovakia	2020	5	0
Slovakia	2022	2	0
Slovakia	2023	6	0
Slovakia	2024	10	0
Slovakia	2025	9	0
Total		55	0

== Personal life ==
Gyömbér belongs to the Hungarian minority in Slovakia.

== Honours ==
Slovakia

- King's Cup: 2018

Individual

- Peter Dubovský Award: 2013
