= Grigoris Kastanos =

Cypriot footballer (born 1998)

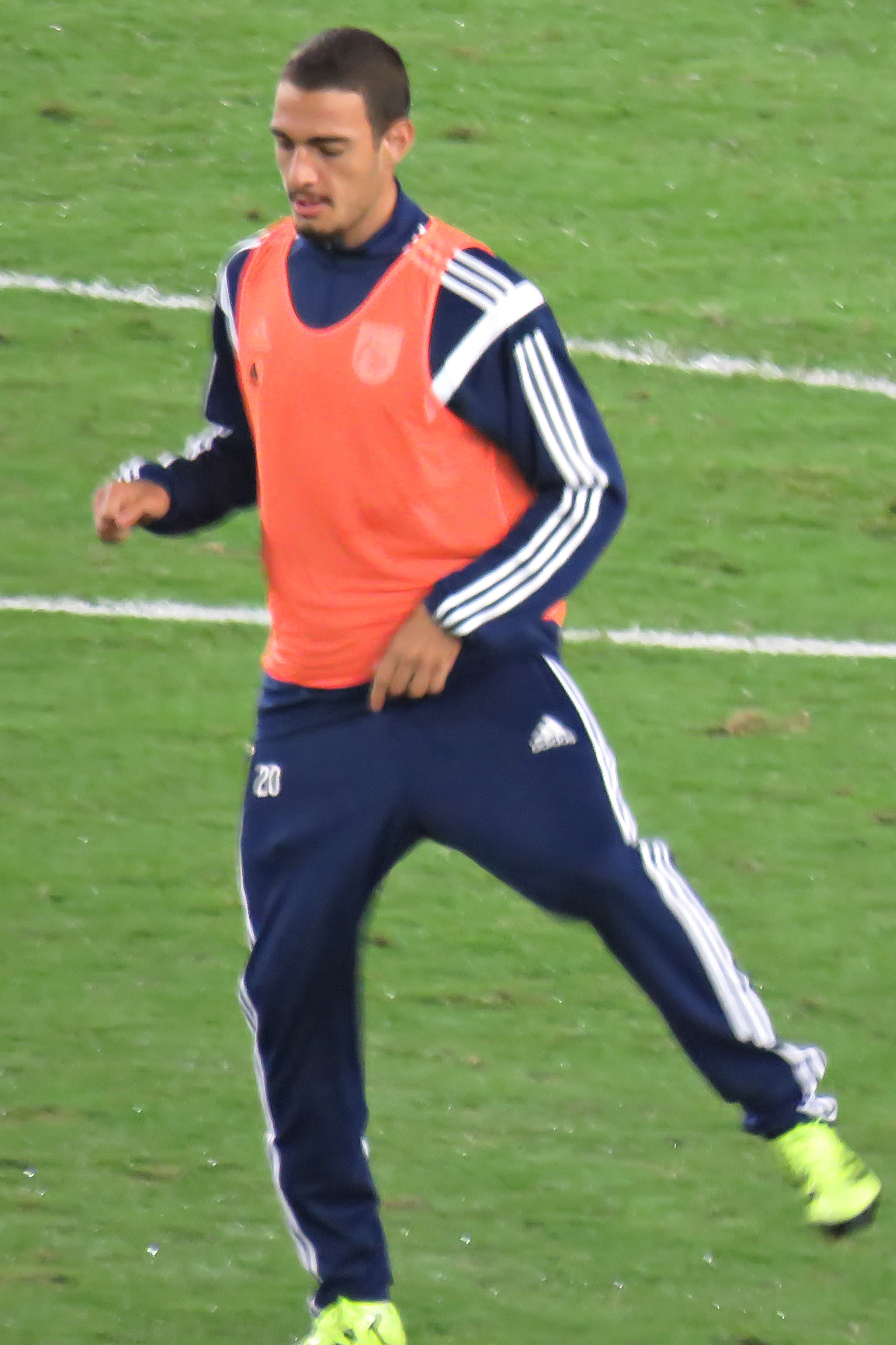
- Kastanos with Cyprus in 2015

Personal information
- Date of birth: 30 January 1998 (age 28)
- Place of birth: Sotira, Cyprus
- Height: 1.76 m (5 ft 9 in)
- Positions: Attacking midfielder; right winger

Team information
- Current team: Hellas Verona
- Number: 20

Youth career
- 2007–2011: Onisilos Sotira
- 2011–2014: Enosis Neon Paralimni
- 2014–2017: Juventus

Senior career*
Years	Team	Apps	(Gls)
2017–2021	Juventus	1	(0)
2017	→ Pescara (loan)	8	(0)
2017–2018	→ Zulte Waregem (loan)	1	(0)
2018–2019	Juventus U23	29	(3)
2019–2020	→ Pescara (loan)	24	(0)
2020–2021	→ Frosinone (loan)	34	(2)
2021–2022	→ Salernitana (loan)	27	(1)
2022–2025	Salernitana	54	(5)
2024–2025	→ Hellas Verona (loan)	27	(1)
2025–	Hellas Verona	6	(0)
2026	→ Aris Limassol (loan)	15	(3)

International career^{‡}
2013	Cyprus U16	2	(1)
2013–2014	Cyprus U17	6	(0)
2015	Cyprus U21	2	(0)
2015–	Cyprus	86	(9)
- * Club domestic league appearances and goals as of 07:06, 26 May 2026 (UTC) ‡ National team caps and goals as of 20:50, 15 November 2026 (UTC)

Grigoris Kastanos (Greek: Γρηγόρης Κάστανος; born 30 January 1998) is a Cypriot professional footballer who plays as an attacking midfielder or right winger for Serie B club Hellas Verona and the Cyprus national team.

== Club career ==
Kastanos was an Enosis Neon Paralimni youth player. In January 2014 he joined the Juventus academy.

On 25 November 2015, he scored both of the team's goals in a 2–1 win against Manchester City in the UEFA Youth League group stage.

On 20 January 2017, Kastanos joined Pescara on loan until the end of season.

On 23 June 2017, Kastanos joined Belgian Pro League side Zulte Waregem on a one-year loan.

On 13 April 2019, Kastanos made his Juventus debut in a 2–1 away loss against S.P.A.L. in Serie A.

On 22 August 2019, he returned to Pescara on another loan.

On 12 September 2020, Kastanos joined Serie B side Frosinone on loan until 30 June 2021.

On 14 August 2021, Kastanos joined Serie A side Salernitana on loan. On 2 August 2022, he returned to Salernitana on a permanent basis and signed a four-year contract with the club.

On 30 July 2024, Kastanos joined Hellas Verona on loan with an option to buy and a conditional obligation to buy.

On 31 January 2026, Kastanos was loaned by Aris Limassol until the end of the season, which became his first senior club in his home country.

== International career ==
In September 2013, Kastanos made three appearances for Cyprus at under-17 level.

He made his debut for the Cyprus national football team on 28 March 2015, replacing captain Konstantinos Makridis for the final six minutes of a 5–0 defeat to Belgium at the King Baudouin Stadium in Brussels, in UEFA Euro 2016 qualifying.

== Career statistics ==
=== Club ===
As of match played 25 May 2025

Appearances and goals by club, season and competition
Club	Season	League			National Cup		Other		Total	
Club	Season	Division	Apps	Goals	Apps	Goals	Apps	Goals	Apps	Goals
Pescara (loan)	2016–17	Serie A	8	0	—		—		8	0
Zulte Waregem (loan)	2017–18	Belgian First Division A	1	0	0	0	3 (Note: Appearances in UEFA Europa League)	0	4	0
Juventus	2018–19	Serie A	1	0	0	0	0	0	1	0
Juventus U23	2018–19	Serie C	29	3	2 (Note: Appearances in Coppa Italia Serie C)	0	—		31	3
Pescara (loan)	2019–20	Serie B	24	0	—		2 (Note: Appearances in Serie B – Relegation play-outs)	0	26	0
Frosinone (loan)	2020–21	Serie B	34	2	0	0	—		34	2
Salernitana (loan)	2021–22	Serie A	27	1	2	0	—		29	1
Salernitana	2022–23	Serie A	28	2	1	0	—		29	2
Salernitana	2023–24	Serie A	26	3	2	0	—		28	3
Salernitana	Total		81	6	5	0	—		86	6
Hellas Verona (loan)	2024–25	Serie A	27	1	1	0	—		28	1
Career total			205	12	8	0	5	0	218	12

=== International ===
As of match played 15 November 2026

Appearances and goals by national team and year
National team	Year	Apps	Goals
Cyprus
Cyprus	2015	2	0
Cyprus	2016	4	0
Cyprus	2017	8	0
Cyprus	2018	5	1
Cyprus	2019	4	0
Cyprus	2020	8	2
Cyprus	2021	12	0
Cyprus	2022	8	0
Cyprus	2023	9	1
Cyprus	2024	7	3
Cyprus	2025	9	1
Cyprus	2026	10	1
Total		86	9

Scores and results list Cyprus' goal tally first, score column indicates score after each Kastanos goal.

List of international goals scored by Grigoris Kastanos
No.	Date	Venue	Opponent	Score	Result	Competition
1	13 October 2018	Vasil Levski National Stadium, Sofia, Bulgaria	Bulgaria	1–0	1–2	2018–19 UEFA Nations League C
2	14 November 2020	GSP Stadium, Nicosia, Cyprus	Luxembourg	1–1	2–1	2020–21 UEFA Nations League C
3	14 November 2020	GSP Stadium, Nicosia, Cyprus	Luxembourg	2–1	2–1	2020–21 UEFA Nations League C
4	20 June 2023	Ullevaal Stadion, Oslo, Norway	Norway	1–3	1–3	UEFA Euro 2024 qualifying Group A
5	11 June 2024	San Marino Stadium, Serravalle, San Marino	San Marino	2–0	4–1	Friendly
6	11 June 2024	San Marino Stadium, Serravalle, San Marino	San Marino	3–0	4–1	Friendly
7	15 November 2024	AEK Arena – Georgios Karapatakis, Larnaca, Cyprus	Lithuania	1–0	2–1	2024–25 UEFA Nations League C
8	12 October 2025	San Marino Stadium, Serravalle, San Marino	San Marino	3–0	4–0	2026 FIFA World Cup qualification
9	30 March 2026	GSP Stadium, Nicosie, Cyprus	Moldova	1–0	3–2	Friendly

== Honours ==
Juventus

- Serie A: 2018–19
