= Gioacchino Galeotafiore =

Italian footballer

Personal information
- Date of birth: 15 February 2000 (age 26)
- Place of birth: Solofra, Italy
- Position: Centre back

Team information
- Current team: Sarnese
- Number: 15

Youth career
- Salernitana

Senior career*
Years	Team	Apps	(Gls)
2018–2022	Salernitana	1	(0)
2020–2021	→ Foggia (loan)	17	(0)
2021–2022	→ Seregno (loan)	28	(1)
2023–2024	Paganese	30	(0)
2024–2025	Palmese	23	(0)
2025	Acerrana	9	(0)
2026-	Sarnese	11	(0)
- * Club domestic league appearances and goals as of 22 March 2026

Gioacchino Galeotafiore (born 15 February 2000) is an Italian professional footballer who plays as a centre back for Serie D club ASD Sarnese Calcio.

== Club career ==
Formed on Salernitana youth system, Galeotafiore made his first team debut on 5 August 2018 for Coppa Italia against Rezzato. He made his Serie B debut on 13 July 2020 against Cittadella.

On 10 October 2020, he was loaned to Serie C club Foggia.

On 11 August 2021, he was loaned again to Seregno.

On 25 July 2023, Galeotafiore signed with Paganese in Serie D.

On 12 July 2024, he signed with USD Palmese.

On 29 June 2025, he signed with Real Acerrana.

On 7 November 2025, Galeotafiore signed with ASD Sarnese 1926.
