= Flavius Daniliuc =

Austrian footballer (born 2001)

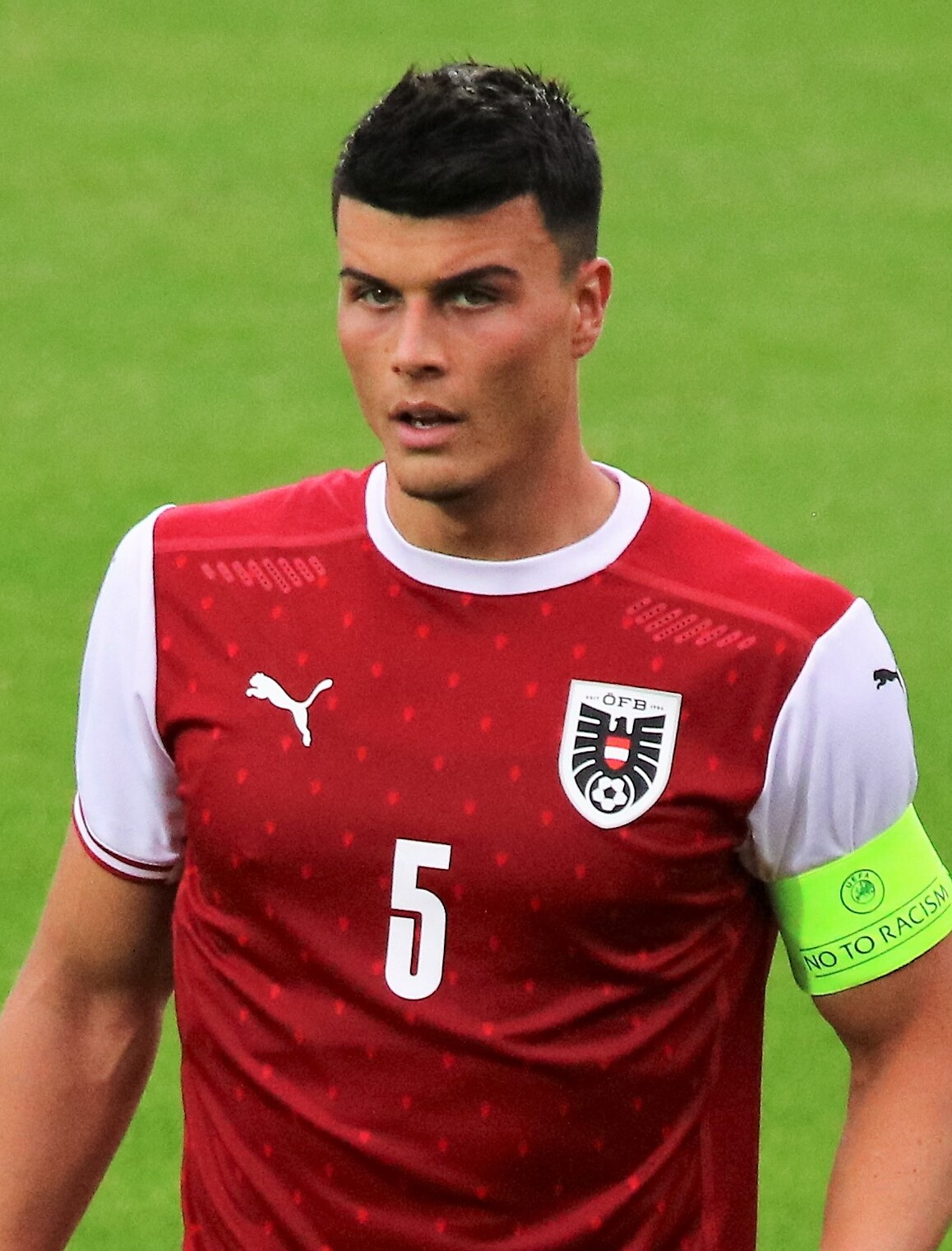
- Daniliuc with Austria U21 in 2022

Personal information
- Full name: Flavius David Daniliuc
- Date of birth: 27 April 2001 (age 25)
- Place of birth: Vienna, Austria
- Height: 1.88 m (6 ft 2 in)
- Position: Defender

Team information
- Current team: Basel
- Number: 24

Youth career
- 2009–2010: Admira Wacker
- 2010–2011: Rapid Wien
- 2011–2014: Real Madrid
- 2012: → FC Liefering (loan)
- 2014: → DFI Bad Aibling (loan)
- 2015–2020: Bayern Munich

Senior career*
Years	Team	Apps	(Gls)
2019–2020	Bayern Munich II	4	(0)
2020–2022	Nice	49	(1)
2022–2025	Salernitana	44	(1)
2024	→ Red Bull Salzburg (loan)	11	(0)
2024–2025	→ Hellas Verona (loan)	18	(0)
2025–	Basel	36	(2)

International career^{‡}
2015–2016	Austria U15	12	(1)
2016–2017	Austria U16	5	(1)
2017	Austria U17	3	(0)
2018	Austria U18	1	(0)
2019	Austria U19	5	(0)
2021–2022	Austria U21	9	(0)
2023–	Austria	3	(0)
- * Club domestic league appearances and goals as of 20 September 2026 ‡ National team caps and goals as of 8 June 2024

Flavius David Daniliuc (born 27 April 2001) is an Austrian professional footballer who plays as a defender for Swiss Super League club Basel.

== Club career ==
=== Early years and Bayern Munich ===
Daniliuc began his youth career with Admira Wacker Mödling, before moving to Rapid Wien in 2010. The following year, he joined the junior academy of Spanish club Real Madrid, where he won a youth league title. His international transfer was one of the cases which resulted in the transfer ban imposed on Real Madrid by FIFA in 2016.

Daniliuc moved to Germany in 2014 on the advice of Bayern Munich defender and fellow countryman David Alaba, whom Daniliuc's father had met. He first entered the DFI Bad Aibling youth team, before joining the Bayern Munich youth academy in January 2015. In October 2018, Daniliuc was included in The Guardian's "Next Generation 2018", which listed the 60 most talented footballers born in 2001. He made his professional debut for Bayern Munich II in the 3. Liga on 26 July 2019, starting in a home match with KFC Uerdingen.

=== Nice ===
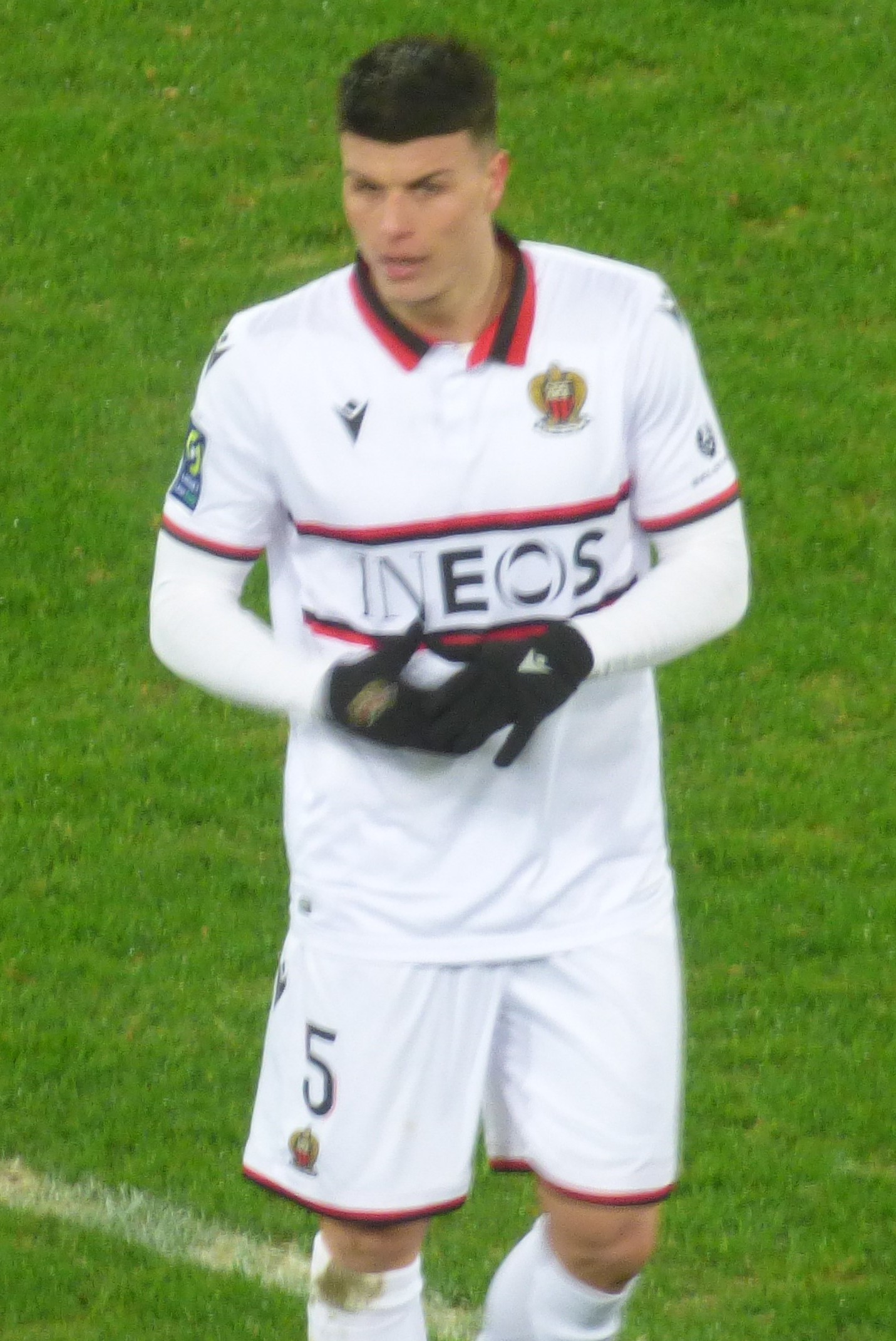
Daniliuc with Nice in 2021

On 18 June 2020, French club Nice announced the signing of 19-year-old Daniliuc from Bayern Munich. He recorded his Ligue 1 debut on 20 September that year, entering the field in the 65th minute of a 3–0 home defeat to Paris Saint-Germain, and his first European game on 5 November, in a 3–2 UEFA Europa League away loss to Slavia Prague.

Daniliuc scored his first senior goal in a 2–1 victory over Rennes at the Roazhon Park, on 26 February 2021.

=== Salernitana ===
On 29 August 2022, Daniliuc signed a four-year contract with Salernitana in Italy.

On 31 January 2024, Daniliuc joined Austrian Bundesliga club Red Bull Salzburg on loan for the remainder of the season.

On 30 August 2024, Daniliuc moved on a new loan to Hellas Verona.

=== Basel ===
On 1 September 2025, Daniliuc signed a three-season contract with Basel in Swiss Super League. He scored his first league goal on 18 October 2025, in the 3–0 home win over FC Winterthur.

== International career ==
Daniliuc began his international youth career with the under-15 team of Austria in October 2015 against Montenegro. He advanced through the under-16 and under-17 teams in 2016 and 2017. On 19 November 2018, he debuted for Austria national under-18 football team in a 1–0 friendly loss against the Czech Republic.

On 27 March 2023, Daniliuc debuted for the Austrian senior squad during a UEFA Euro 2024 qualifying match against Estonia.

== Personal life ==
Daniliuc was born in Vienna, Austria, to Romanian parents from Suceava who fled their home country before the fall of Communism. His older twin brothers, Daniel and Manuel, are also footballers.

== Career statistics ==
=== Club ===
As of match played 20 September 2026

Appearances and goals by club, season and competition
Club	Season	League			National cup (Note: Includes Coupe de France, Coppa Italia, Austrian Cup, Swiss Cup)		Europe		Other		Total	
Club	Season	Division	Apps	Goals	Apps	Goals	Apps	Goals	Apps	Goals	Apps	Goals
Bayern Munich II	2019–20	3. Liga	4	0	—		—		—		4	0
Nice	2020–21	Ligue 1	23	1	1	0	2 (Note: Appearances in the UEFA Europa League)	0	—		26	1
Nice	2021–22	Ligue 1	24	0	3	0	—		—		27	0
Nice	2022–23	Ligue 1	2	0	—		0	0	—		2	0
Nice	Total		49	1	4	0	2	0	—		55	1
Salernitana	2022–23	Serie A	27	0	—		—		—		27	0
Salernitana	2023–24	Serie A	14	0	1	0	—		—		15	0
Salernitana	2024–25	Serie B	3	1	1	0	—		—		4	1
Salernitana	Total		44	1	2	0	—		—		46	1
Red Bull Salzburg (loan)	2023–24	Austrian Bundesliga	11	0	1	0	—		—		12	0
Hellas Verona (loan)	2024–25	Serie A	18	0	—		—		—		18	0
Basel	2025–26	Swiss Super League	27	2	2	0	7	1	—		36	3
Basel	2026–27	Swiss Super League	9	0	1	0	—		—		10	0
Basel	Total		36	2	3	0	7	1	—		46	3
Career total			162	4	10	0	9	1	—		181	5

=== International ===
As of match played 8 June 2024

Appearances and goals by national team and year
National team	Year	Apps	Goals
Austria	2023	1	0
Austria	2024	2	0
Total		3	0

== Honours ==
FC Bayern Munich II

- 3. Liga: 2019–20

Nice

- Coupe de France runner-up: 2021–22
