= Federico Bonazzoli =

Italian footballer (born 1997)

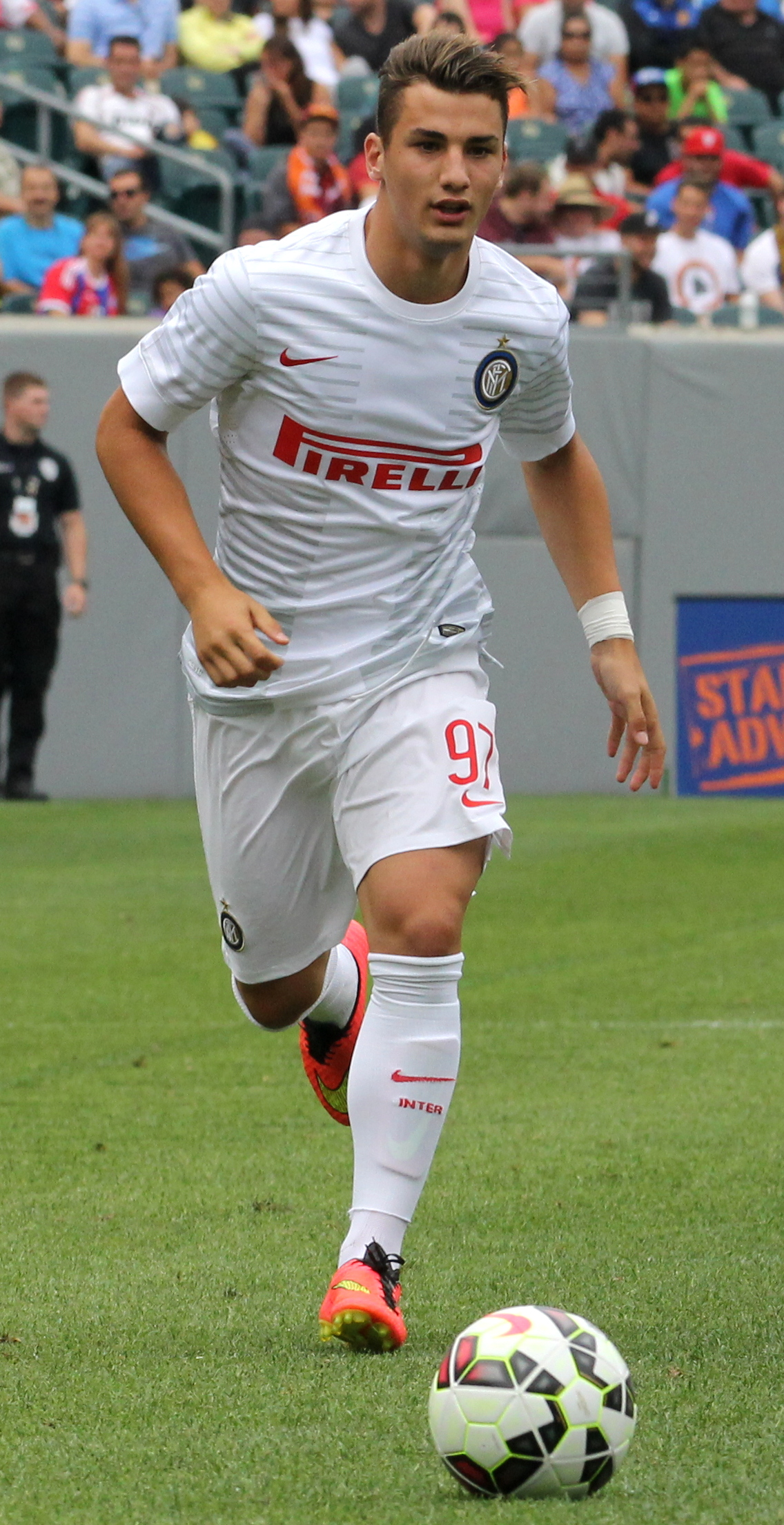
- Bonazzoli with Inter Milan in 2014

Personal information
- Date of birth: 21 May 1997 (age 29)
- Place of birth: Manerbio, Italy
- Height: 1.85 m (6 ft 1 in)
- Position: Forward

Team information
- Current team: Cremonese
- Number: 90

Youth career
- 2001–2003: Ghedi
- 2003–2004: Montichiari
- 2004–2014: Inter Milan

Senior career*
Years	Team	Apps	(Gls)
2014–2015	Inter Milan	4	(0)
2015–2022	Sampdoria	26	(6)
2015	→ Inter Milan (loan)	1	(0)
2016	→ Lanciano (loan)	14	(1)
2016–2017	→ Brescia (loan)	25	(2)
2017–2018	→ SPAL (loan)	11	(0)
2018–2019	→ Padova (loan)	35	(8)
2020–2021	→ Torino (loan)	20	(2)
2021–2022	→ Salernitana (loan)	32	(10)
2022–2024	Salernitana	24	(2)
2023–2024	→ Hellas Verona (loan)	24	(3)
2024–	Cremonese	61	(16)

International career
2012	Italy U15	9	(6)
2012	Italy U16	1	(1)
2012–2014	Italy U17	20	(8)
2013	Italy U18	2	(1)
2014–2015	Italy U19	12	(6)
2017–2018	Italy U20	6	(3)
2014–2019	Italy U21	9	(2)
Medal record
Men's Football
Representing Italy
UEFA European Under-17 Championship
Second place	2013 Slovakia
- * Club domestic league appearances and goals as of 25 May 2026

Federico Bonazzoli (born 21 May 1997) is an Italian professional footballer who plays as a forward for Serie B club Cremonese.

== Club career ==
=== Inter Milan ===
Bonazzoli played at youth level for Ghedi and Montechiari, before joining Inter Milan at the age of seven.

On 18 May 2014, Bonazzoli made his senior debut against Chievo Verona as a substitute for Rubén Botta in the 85th minute of a 1–2 away defeat on the last day of the Serie A season. He became the second youngest footballer to play in Serie A for Inter aged 16 years, 11 months and 27 days, 17 days older than Massimo Pellegrini, who debuted in 1982. On 6 November 2014 he made his UEFA Europa League debut in a 1–1 away draw against Saint-Étienne in the group stage, he was replaced by Joel Obi in the 66th minute.

=== Sampdoria ===
On 2 February 2015, Bonazzoli signed for fellow league team Sampdoria for €4.5 million, but would remain at Inter on loan until the end of the season.

On 21 January 2016, he was signed by Serie B club Lanciano on a season-long loan deal, with an option to purchase. On 22 July, he joined Brescia on loan.

==== Loan to Torino ====
On 5 October 2020, Bonazzoli joined Torino on loan.

==== Loan to Salernitana ====
On 3 August 2021, US Salernitana announced the signing of Bonazzoli on a season-long loan with an option to buy. He scored two goals in his Coppa Italia debut win over Reggina.

=== Salernitana ===
On 26 July 2022, Bonazzoli signed permanently with Salernitana on a four-year contract, for a reported fee of €5 million.

=== Cremonese ===
On 6 August 2024, Bonazzoli signed a four-season contract with Cremonese.

== International career ==
With the Italy U-17 side he took part at the 2013 UEFA European Under-17 Championship.

He made his debut with the Italy U-21 team on 17 November 2014, in a home friendly match loss 1–0 against Denmark, becoming the youngest player to make his debut with the team at the time.

== Style of play ==
Bonazzoli models himself on former Inter forward Zlatan Ibrahimović. He is highly rated by Inter fans as a Christian Vieri-like striker, with a great physique and technical abilities.

== Career statistics ==
As of match played 24 May 2026

Appearances and goals by club, season and competition
Club	Season	League			Coppa Italia		Continental		Other		Total	
Club	Season	Division	Apps	Goals	Apps	Goals	Apps	Goals	Apps	Goals	Apps	Goals
Inter Milan	2013–14	Serie A	1	0	1	0	–		–		2	0
Inter Milan	2014–15	Serie A	4	0	1	0	2 (Note: Appearances in UEFA Europa League)	0	–		7	0
Inter Milan	Total		5	0	2	0	2	0	–		9	0
Sampdoria	2015–16	Serie A	4	0	1	0	2	0	–		7	0
Sampdoria	2017–18	Serie A	1	0	0	0	–		–		1	0
Sampdoria	2019–20	Serie A	19	6	0	0	–		–		19	6
Sampdoria	2020–21	Serie A	2	0	–		–		–		2	0
Sampdoria	Total		26	6	1	0	2	0	–		29	6
Lanciano (loan)	2015–16	Serie B	14	1	–		–		2 (Note: Appearances in Serie B – Relegation play-out)	0	16	1
Brescia (loan)	2016–17	Serie B	25	2	1	0	–		–		26	2
SPAL (loan)	2017–18	Serie A	11	0	0	0	–		–		11	0
Padova (loan)	2018–19	Serie B	35	8	2	0	–		–		37	8
Torino (loan)	2020–21	Serie A	20	2	2	1	–		–		22	3
Salernitana (loan)	2021–22	Serie A	32	10	1	2	–		–		33	12
Salernitana	2022–23	Serie A	24	2	1	0	–		–		25	2
Hellas Verona (loan)	2023–24	Serie A	24	3	0	0	–		–		24	3
Cremonese	2024–25	Serie B	26	6	1	0	–		2	0	29	6
Cremonese	2025–26	Serie A	35	10	1	0	–		–		36	10
Cremonese	Total		61	16	2	0	–		2	0	65	16
Career total			277	50	12	3	4	0	4	0	297	53

== Honours ==
Italy U17

- UEFA European Under-17 Championship runner-up: 2013

Individual

- Serie A Goal of the Month: August 2025
