= Luigi Sepe =

Italian footballer (born 1991)

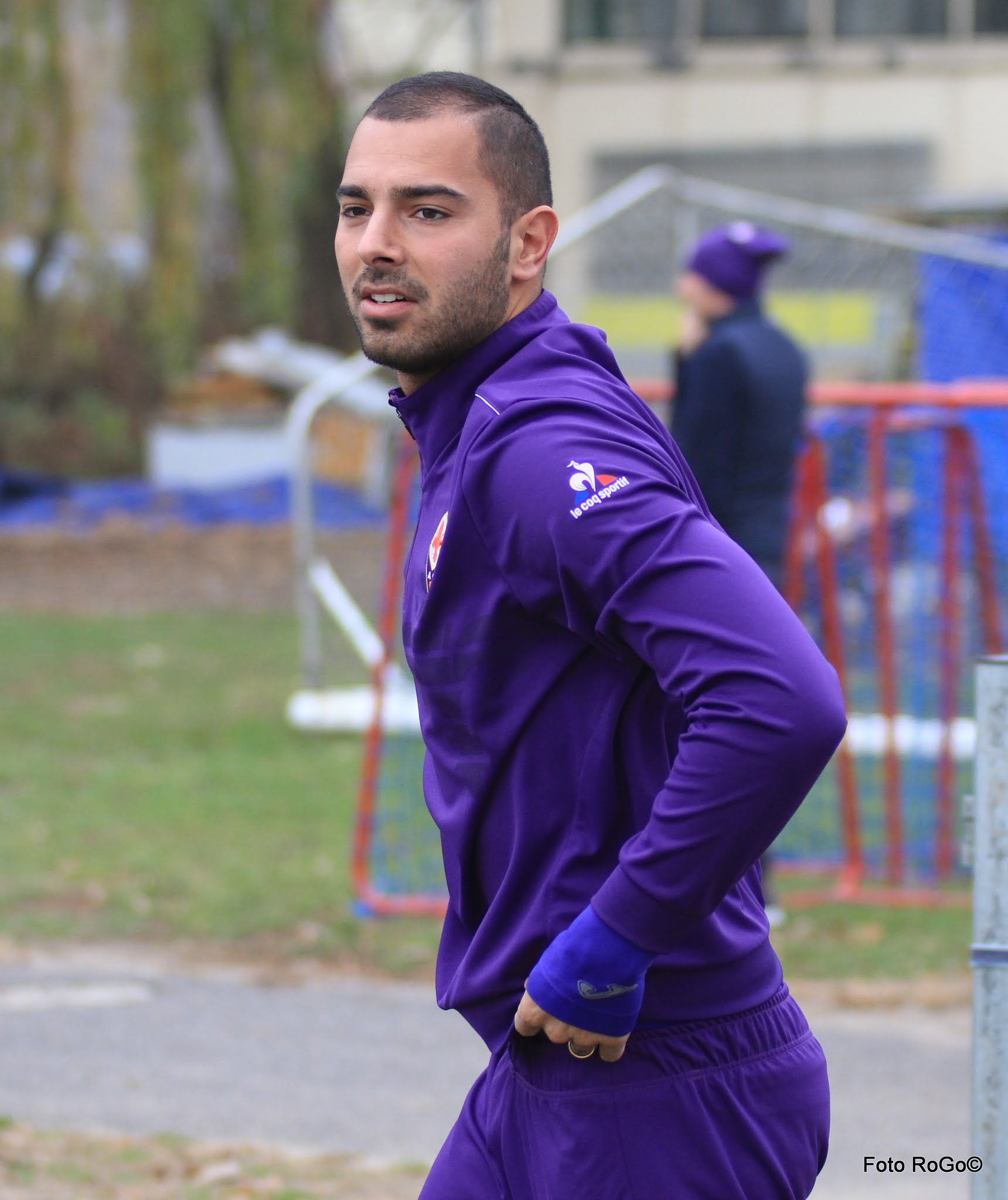
- Sepe with Fiorentina in 2015

Personal information
- Date of birth: 8 May 1991 (age 35)
- Place of birth: Torre del Greco, Italy
- Height: 1.85 m (6 ft 1 in)
- Position: Goalkeeper

Youth career
- –2011: Napoli

Senior career*
Years	Team	Apps	(Gls)
2009–2019	Napoli	2	(0)
2011–2013	→ Pisa (loan)	35	(0)
2013–2014	→ Virtus Lanciano (loan)	39	(0)
2014–2015	→ Empoli (loan)	31	(0)
2015–2016	→ Fiorentina (loan)	0	(0)
2018–2020	→ Parma (loan)	71	(0)
2020–2022	Parma	36	(0)
2022	→ Salernitana (loan)	16	(0)
2022–2025	Salernitana	35	(0)
2023–2024	→ Lazio (loan)	0	(0)

International career
2009	Italy U18	4	(0)
2009	Italy U19	5	(0)
- * Club domestic league appearances and goals as of 13 May 2025

Luigi Sepe (born 8 May 1991) is an Italian professional footballer who plays as a goalkeeper.

== Club career ==
Born in Torre del Greco, the Province of Naples, Sepe made his debut for his hometown club in Serie A on 28 January 2009, aged 17, during the match against Fiorentina, lost 2–1. He replaced Gianello in the 32nd minute. He wore the number 44 jersey during the 2008–09 season. He was the fourth keeper behind Gennaro Iezzo, Nicolás Navarro and Matteo Gianello.

In 2010–11 season, he was named in 2010–11 UEFA Europa League as list B member (U21 youth product), which he was the fourth keeper behind Morgan De Sanctis, Iezzo and Gianello.

From 2011 to 2018, Sepe was loaned out to different Italian teams such as Pisa, Virtus Lanciano, Empoli and Fiorentina.

On 10 July 2018, Sepe signed with Parma on loan until 30 June 2019. On 10 July 2019, the deal was made permanent.

On 24 January 2022, he joined Salernitana on loan with a conditional obligation to buy.

On 25 August 2023, Sepe joined Lazio on loan.

== International career ==
Sepe started three out of four matches for the Italy U18 team at the U18 Slovakia International Cup, ahead if Valerio Frasca in April 2009. Sepe made successive appearances with the Italy U19 team (born 1991 or later) from March to September in 2009. In both appearances, he replaced Simone Colombi for the second half, including versus Ukraine (born 1990 or later team). He was the reserve keeper for Colombi at the 2010 UEFA European Under-19 Football Championship qualification, and he also played once. After Italy qualified to the next round, he did not receive any call-ups again.

== Personal life ==
In 2011, Sepe married Anna Laura Acampora, the niece of former footballer and now coach Carmine Gautieri. The couple has two children from the marriage, Giuseppe born in 2011 and Diego born in 2014.

== Career statistics ==
=== Club ===
As of match played 18 January 2025

Appearances and goals by club, season and competition
Club	Season	League			National cup (Note: Includes Coppa Italia and Coppa Italia Lega Pro)		Continental		Other		Total	
Club	Season	Division	Apps	Goals	Apps	Goals	Apps	Goals	Apps	Goals	Apps	Goals
Napoli	2008–09	Serie A	1	0	0	0	—		—		1	0
Napoli	2016–17	Serie A	0	0	0	0	0	0	—		0	0
Napoli	2017–18	Serie A	1	0	2	0	0	0	—		3	0
Napoli	Total		2	0	2	0	0	0	—		4	0
Pisa (loan)	2011–12	Lega Pro	6	0	2	0	—		—		8	0
Pisa (loan)	2012–13	Lega Pro	29	0	2	0	—		4 (Note: Appearances in Lega Pro Prima Divisione promotion play-offs)	0	35	0
Pisa (loan)	Total		35	0	4	0	—		4	0	43	0
Virtus Lanciano (loan)	2013–14	Serie B	39	0	1	0	—		—		40	0
Empoli (loan)	2014–15	Serie A	31	0	1	0	—		—		32	0
Fiorentina (loan)	2015–16	Serie A	0	0	1	0	6 (Note: Appearances in UEFA Europa League)	0	—		7	0
Parma (loan)	2018–19	Serie A	37	0	1	0	—		—		38	0
Parma (loan)	2019–20	Serie A	34	0	1	0	—		—		35	0
Parma	2020–21	Serie A	36	0	1	0	—		—		37	0
Parma	Total		107	0	3	0	—		—		110	0
Salernitana (loan)	2021–22	Serie A	16	0	—		—		—		16	0
Salernitana	2022–23	Serie A	17	0	1	0	—		—		18	0
Salernitana	2024–25	Serie B	18	0	1	0	—		0	0	19	0
Salernitana	Total		51	0	2	0	—		0	0	53	0
Lazio (loan)	2023–24	Serie A	0	0	0	0	0	0	0	0	0	0
Career total			265	0	14	0	6	0	4	0	289	0

== Honours ==
Pisa

- Coppa Italia Lega Pro runner-up: 2011–12
