= Andrei Motoc =

Moldovan footballer (born 2002)

- Motoc with Moldova U21 in 2023

Personal information
- Date of birth: 13 December 2002 (age 23)
- Place of birth: Chișinău, Moldova
- Height: 1.95 m (6 ft 5 in)
- Position: Defender

Team information
- Current team: Renate
- Number: 13

Youth career
- –2018: Granamica
- 2018–2019: Sasso Giovanili
- 2019–2021: Carpi
- 2021–2022: Salernitana

Senior career*
Years	Team	Apps	(Gls)
2020–2021	Carpi	1	(0)
2021–2024	Salernitana	1	(0)
2023	→ Siena (loan)	5	(0)
2023–2024	→ Legnago Salus (loan)	29	(0)
2024–2025	Athens Kallithea	12	(0)
2025	→ Entella (loan)	2	(0)
2025–2026	Trapani	21	(1)
2026–	Renate	5	(0)

International career^{‡}
2022–2024	Moldova U21	13	(0)
2024–	Moldova	1	(0)
- * Club domestic league appearances and goals as of 27 September 2026 ‡ National team caps and goals as of 19 November 2024

Andrei Motoc (born 13 December 2002) is a Moldovan professional footballer who plays as a defender for Serie C Group A club Renate and the Moldova national team.

== Club career ==
Motoc made his Serie C debut for Carpi on 3 March 2021, in a game against Legnago Salus.

On 1 September 2021, Motoc joined Salernitana, and he made his Serie A debut with the club on 15 January 2022, in 3–0 home defeat against Lazio.

On 6 January 2023, Motoc was sent on loan to Serie C side Siena until the end of the season, with option and counter-option to buy both included in the deal.

On 23 August 2023, Motoc moved on a new loan to Legnago.

On 25 July 2024, he joined Athens Kallithea on permanent basis.

On 30 January 2025, he joined Virtus Entella on loan.

== Career statistics ==
=== Club ===
Club	Season	Division	League		Cup		Total	
Club	Season	Division	Apps	Goals	Apps	Goals	Apps	Goals
Carpi	2020–21	Serie C	1	0	1	0	2	0
Salernitana	2021–22	Serie A	1	0	0	0	1	0
Siena (loan)	2022–23	Serie C	5	0	—		5	0
Legnago (loan)	2023–24	Serie C	29	0	—		29	0
Athens Kallithea	2024–25	Super League Greece	10	0	0	0	3	0
Career Total			46	0	1	0	40	0
