= 2024–25 Hellas Verona FC season =

Hellas Verona FC
2024–25 season
- Owner: Seven 23 s.r.l. (until 14 January); Presidio Investors (from 15 January)
- President: Maurizio Setti (until 14 January); Italo Zanzi (from 15 January)
- Head coach: Paolo Zanetti
- Stadium: Stadio Marcantonio Bentegodi
- Serie A: 14th
- Coppa Italia: First round
- Top goalscorer: League: Casper Tengstedt (6); All: Casper Tengstedt (7)
- Highest home attendance: 29,575 vs Juventus; 26 August 2024, Serie A
- Lowest home attendance: 7,048 vs Cesena; 10 August 2024, Coppa Italia
- Average home league attendance: 24,967
- Biggest win: 3–0 vs Napoli (H); 18 August 2024, Serie A
- Biggest defeat: 1–6 vs Atalanta (A); 26 October 2024, Serie A 0–5 vs Internazionale (H); 23 November 2024, Serie A 0–5 vs Atalanta (H); 8 February 2025, Serie A
Home colours	Away colours	Third colours

The 2024–25 season was Hellas Verona Football Club's 122nd season in its history, and their sixth consecutive season in Serie A. In addition to the domestic league, the club competed in the Coppa Italia.

== Squad ==
As of 4 February 2025

Note: Flags indicate national team as defined under FIFA eligibility rules; some limited exceptions apply. Players may hold more than one non-FIFA nationality.

No.	Pos.	Nation	Player
1	GK	ITA	Lorenzo Montipò
2	DF	ENG	Daniel Oyegoke
3	DF	DEN	Martin Frese
4	DF	AUT	Flavius Daniliuc (on loan from Salernitana)
5	DF	ITA	Davide Faraoni (captain)
6	DF	ARG	Nicolás Valentini (on loan from Fiorentina)
7	FW	FRA	Mathis Lambourde
8	MF	SRB	Darko Lazović (vice-captain)
9	FW	SWE	Amin Sarr (on loan from Lyon)
10	MF	SEN	Cheikh Niasse (on loan from Young Boys)
11	FW	DEN	Casper Tengstedt (on loan from Benfica)
12	DF	CRO	Domagoj Bradarić (on loan from Salernitana)
14	FW	CPV	Dailon Rocha Livramento
15	DF	FRA	Yllan Okou (on loan from Bastia)
18	MF	NED	Abdou Harroui
19	DF	DEN	Tobias Slotsager

No.	Pos.	Nation	Player
20	MF	CYP	Grigoris Kastanos (on loan from Salernitana)
22	GK	ITA	Alessandro Berardi
24	MF	FRA	Antoine Bernède (on loan from Lausanne-Sport)
25	MF	GER	Suat Serdar
27	DF	POL	Paweł Dawidowicz
31	MF	SVK	Tomáš Suslov
33	MF	SVK	Ondrej Duda
34	GK	ITA	Simone Perilli
35	FW	COL	Daniel Mosquera
38	DF	CMR	Jackson Tchatchoua
42	DF	ITA	Diego Coppola
72	FW	CIV	Junior Ajayi
80	MF	ITA	Alphadjo Cissè
87	DF	ITA	Daniele Ghilardi
98	GK	ITA	Federico Magro

== Transfers ==
=== Summer window ===
==== In ====
Date	Pos.	Player	From	Fee	Notes	Ref.
30 June 2024	DF	(Italy) Davide Faraoni	(Italy) Fiorentina	End of loan		
30 June 2024	DF	(Italy) Daniele Ghilardi	(Italy) Sampdoria	End of loan		
1 July 2024	DF	(Italy) Christian Corradi	(Italy) Vicenza	€500,000	Loan transfer made permanent	
1 July 2024	DF	(Cameroon) Jackson Tchatchoua	(Belgium) Charleroi	€3,000,000	Loan transfer made permanent	
1 July 2024	MF	(Germany) Suat Serdar	(Germany) Hertha BSC	€4,500,000	Loan transfer made permanent	
4 July 2024	FW	(Colombia) Daniel Mosquera	(Colombia) América de Cali	€700,000		
9 July 2024	DF	(Morocco) Abdou Harroui	(Italy) Frosinone	€1,200,000		
10 July 2024	DF	(Denmark) Martin Frese	(Denmark) Nordsjælland	Free		
18 July 2024	MF	(Brazil) Charlys	(Brazil) Vitória	€100,000	Loan transfer made permanent	
24 July 2024	FW	(Cape Verde) Dailon Livramento	(Netherlands) MVV Maastricht	€600,000		
30 August 2024	FW	(France) Mathis Lambourde	(France) Rennes	Free		
30 August 2024	MF	(Belgium) Ayanda Sishuba	(France) Lens	€2,500,000		

==== Loans in ====
Date	Pos.	Player	From	Fee	Notes	Ref.
29 July 2024	DF	(France) Yllan Okou	(France) Bastia	Free	Option to buy for €1,600,000	
30 July 2024	MF	(Cyprus) Grigoris Kastanos	(Italy) Salernitana	Free	Obligation to buy for €1,200,000 under conditions	
9 August 2024	FW	(Denmark) Casper Tengstedt	(Portugal) Benfica	Free	Option to buy for €7,000,000	
25 August 2024	FW	(Germany) Faride Alidou	(Germany) Eintracht Frankfurt	Free	Option to buy for €4,000,000	
27 August 2024	FW	(Sweden) Amin Sarr	(France) Lyon	Free	Option to buy for €5,000,000	
30 August 2024	DF	(Croatia) Domagoj Bradarić	(Italy) Salernitana	Free	Option to buy for an undisclosed fee	
30 August 2024	DF	(Austria) Flavius Daniliuc	(Italy) Salernitana	Free	Option to buy for €4,000,000	

==== Out ====
Date	Pos.	Player	To	Fee	Notes	Ref.
30 June 2024	FW	(Italy) Federico Bonazzoli	(Italy) Salernitana	End of loan		
30 June 2024	DF	(France) Fabien Centonze	(France) Nantes	End of loan		
30 June 2024	MF	(Italy) Michael Folorunsho	(Italy) Napoli	End of loan		
30 June 2024	FW	(Poland) Karol Świderski	(United States) Charlotte	End of loan		
30 June 2024	DF	(Portugal) Rúben Vinagre	(Portugal) Sporting CP	End of loan		
1 July 2024	DF	(Italy) Diego Fornari	(Italy) Monte Prodeco	Free		
1 July 2024	FW	(Netherlands) Tijjani Noslin	(Italy) Lazio	€12,000,000		
1 July 2024	DF	(Switzerland) Kevin Rüegg	(Switzerland) Basel	€440,000	Loan made permanent	
5 July 2024	FW	(Ghana) Philip Yeboah	(Italy) Monopoli	Undisclosed		
7 July 2024	MF	(Italy) Christian Pierobon	(Italy) Juve Stabia	Undisclosed		
9 July 2024	DF	(Turkey) Mert Çetin	(Turkey) MKE Ankaragücü	Free	Contract termination by mutual consent	
18 July 2024	DF	(Colombia) Juan Cabal	(Italy) Juventus	€12,800,000		
24 July 2024	FW	(Italy) Davide Bragantini	(Italy) Mantova	Undisclosed		
17 August 2024	FW	(Spain) Jordi Mboula	(Portugal) Gil Vicente	Undisclosed		
21 August 2024	FW	(Slovenia) David Flakus Bosilj	(Spain) Castellón	Free		
30 August 2024	DF	(Italy) Federico Ceccherini	(Italy) Cremonese	Undisclosed		
30 August 2024	MF	(Australia) Ajdin Hrustic	(Italy) Salernitana	Free		
25 October 2024	MF	(Italy) Bruno Conti	(Italy) Brindisi	Free		

==== Loans out ====
Date	Pos.	Player	To	Fee	Notes	Ref.
1 July 2024	DF	(Germany) Koray Günter	(Turkey) Göztepe	Free		
10 July 2024	DF	(Italy) Edoardo Bernardi	(Italy) Trento	Free		
12 July 2024	FW	(Italy) Federico Caia	(Italy) Virtus Verona	Free		
16 July 2024	FW	(France) Thomas Henry	(Italy) Palermo	€280,000	Obligation to buy for €2,500,000 under certain conditions	
18 July 2024	FW	(Italy) Mattia Florio	(Italy) Caldiero Terme	Free		
19 July 2024	MF	(Brazil) Charlys	(Italy) Cosenza	Free	Option to buy for an undisclosed fee with buy-back option for an undisclosed fee	
19 July 2024	FW	(Italy) Kevin Lasagna	(Italy) Bari	Free	Obligation to buy for an undisclosed fee under certain conditions	
30 July 2024	FW	(Sierra Leone) Yayah Kallon	(Italy) Salernitana	Free		
5 August 2024	MF	(Poland) Mateusz Praszelik	(Italy) Südtirol	Free		
11 August 2024	FW	(Netherlands) Jayden Braaf	(Italy) Salernitana	Free		
24 August 2024	DF	(Italy) Nicolò Calabrese	(Italy) Virtus Verona	Free	Option to buy for an undisclosed fee obligation to buy under certain conditions	
30 August 2024	FW	(Netherlands) Elayis Tavşan	(Italy) Cesena	Free		
6 September 2024	FW	(Serbia) Stefan Mitrović	(Belgium) OH Leuven	Free	Option to buy for an undisclosed fee	
21 September 2024	GK	(Italy) Mattia Chiesa	(United Arab Emirates) Sporting Dubai	Free		

=== Winter window ===
==== In ====
Date	Pos.	Player	From	Fee	Notes	Ref.
9 January 2025	GK	(Italy) Giacomo Toniolo	(Italy) Legnago	Loan terminated early		
20 January 2025	DF	(Italy) Mattia Rigo	(Italy) Virtus Verona	Loan terminated early		
28 January 2025	DF	(England) Daniel Oyegoke	(Scotland) Heart of Midlothian	€400,000		
29 January 2025	DF	(Italy) Edoardo Bernardi	(Italy) Trento	Loan terminated early		
2 February 2025	FW	(Sierra Leone) Yayah Kallon	(Italy) Salernitana	Loan terminated early		
3 February 2025	DF	(Denmark) Tobias Slotsager	(Denmark) OB	€1,000,000		

==== Loans in ====
Date	Pos.	Player	From	Fee	Notes	Ref.
30 January 2024	MF	(Senegal) Cheikh Niasse	(Switzerland) Young Boys	Free	Obligation to buy for an undisclosed fee under certain conditions	
3 February 2025	DF	(Argentina) Nicolás Valentini	(Italy) Fiorentina	Free		
3 February 2025	DF	(France) Antoine Bernède	(Switzerland) Lausanne-Sport	Free	Obligation to buy for an undisclosed fee under certain conditions	

==== Out ====
Date	Pos.	Player	To	Fee	Notes	Ref.
23 January 2023	FW	(Germany) Faride Alidou	(Germany) Eintracht Frankfurt	Loan terminated early		
28 January 2025	DF	(Italy) Giangiacomo Magnani	(Italy) Palermo	€600,000		
29 January 2025	MF	(Spain) Joselito	(Italy) Perugia	Free		
3 February 2025	MF	(Morocco) Reda Belahyane	(Italy) Lazio	€9,500,000		
3 February 2025	MF	(Portugal) Dani Silva	(Denmark) Midtjylland	€3,500,000		
3 February 2025	MF	(Belgium) Ayanda Sishuba	(France) Rennes	€500,000		

==== Loans out ====
Date	Pos.	Player	To	Fee	Notes	Ref.
30 January 2025	DF	(Italy) Edoardo Bernardi	(Italy) Arzignano Valchiampo	Free		
10 January 2025	GK	(Italy) Giacomo Toniolo	(Italy) Lumezzane	Free		
21 January 2025	DF	(Italy) Mattia Rigo	(Italy) Carpi	Free		
3 February 2025	DF	(Italy) Christian Corradi	(Italy) Catanzaro	Free		
3 February 2025	FW	(Argentina) Juan Manuel Cruz	(Italy) Cosenza	Free		
3 February 2025	FW	(Sierra Leone) Yayah Kallon	(Italy) Casertana	Free		

== Friendlies ==
=== Pre-season ===
17 July 2024 Friendly	Hellas Verona (Italy)	4–0	(Italy) Top 22 Veronese	Folgaria
17:00	Magnani 15'; Mosquera 30'; Ajayi 75'; Bragantini 78'	Report		Stadium: Stadio La Pineta; Attendance: 800

21 July 2024 Friendly	Hellas Verona (Italy)	7–1	(Italy) FC Rovereto	Folgaria
17:00	Tchatchoua 43'; Mosquera 47', 55'; Dani Silva 67'; Cissè 69', 72'; Ajayi 87'	Report	Pataoner 39'	Stadium: Stadio La Pineta; Attendance: 2,500

24 July 2024 Friendly	Hellas Verona (Italy)	5–1	(Italy) Virtus Verona	Folgaria
17:00	Mosquera 43'; Mitrović 67'; Cisse 73'; Livramento 76'; Suslov 80'	Report	Manfrin 83'	Stadium: Stadio La Pineta; Referee: Marco Piccinini

27 July 2024 Friendly	Hellas Verona (Italy)	2–2	(Italy) Feralpisalò	Rovereto
20:30	Lazović 59'; Suslov 83'	Report	Di Molfetta 14'; Diop 88'	Stadium: Stadio Quercia; Referee: Giovanni Ayroldi

3 August 2024 Friendly	Hellas Verona (Italy)	1–0	(Greece) Asteras Tripolis	Rovereto
20:30	Serdar 37'	Report		Stadium: Stadio Quercia; Referee: Antonio Atanasov

== Competitions ==
=== Overall record ===
Competition	First match	Last match	Starting round	Final position	Record							
Competition	First match	Last match	Starting round	Final position	Pld	W	D	L	GF	GA	GD	Win %
Serie A	18 August 2024	25 May 2025	Matchday 1	14th	38	10	7	21	34	66	−32	26.32
Coppa Italia	10 August 2024		First round	First round	1	0	0	1	1	2	−1	0.00
Total					39	10	7	22	35	68	−33	25.64

Source: Soccerway

=== Serie A ===
==== League table ====
Pos	Team	Pld	W	D	L	GF	GA	GD	Pts
12	Udinese	38	12	8	18	41	56	−15	44 (Note: Torino finished ahead of Udinese on head-to-head points: Udinese 2–2 Torino, Torino 2–0 Udinese.)
13	Genoa	38	10	13	15	37	49	−12	43
14	Hellas Verona	38	10	7	21	34	66	−32	37
15	Cagliari	38	9	9	20	40	56	−16	36 (Note: Cagliari finished ahead of Parma on head-to-head points: Parma 2–3 Cagliari, Cagliari 2–1 Parma.)
16	Parma	38	7	15	16	44	58	−14	36

Source: Serie A
Rules for classification: 1) Points; 2) Tiebreaker for Champions team and third relegated team; 3) Head-to-head points; 4) Head-to-head goal difference; 5) Goal difference; 6) Goals scored; 7) Draw.
(Note: Head-to-head record is used only after all the matches between the teams in question have been played)

==== Results summary ====
Overall								Home						Away					
Pld	W	D	L	GF	GA	GD	Pts	W	D	L	GF	GA	GD	W	D	L	GF	GA	GD
38	10	7	21	34	66	−32	37	4	5	10	15	36	−21	6	2	11	19	30	−11

Source: Serie A

==== Results by round ====
Round	1	2	3	4	5	6	7	8	9	10	11	12	13	14	15	16	17	18	19	20	21	22	23	24	25	26	27	28	29	30	31	32	33	34	35	36	37	38
Ground	H	H	A	A	H	A	H	H	A	A	H	A	H	A	H	A	H	A	H	A	H	A	A	H	A	H	A	H	A	H	A	H	A	H	A	H	H	A
Result	W	L	W	L	L	L	W	L	L	L	W	L	L	L	L	W	L	W	D	L	L	D	W	L	L	W	L	L	W	D	D	D	L	L	L	D	D	W
Position	2	10	5	7	10	14	10	13	14	15	12	14	14	17	18	17	17	16	14	17	18	17	13	15	16	14	15	15	15	15	14	14	15	15	15	14	14	14

Source: Serie A
A = Away; H = Home; W = Win; D = Draw; L = Loss

==== Matches ====
The match schedule was released on 4 July 2024.

18 August 2024 1	Hellas Verona	3–0	Napoli	Verona
18:30 CEST (UTC+2)	Coppola (yellow card) 20'; Tchatchoua (yellow card) 30'; Livramento 50'; Daniel Mosquera 75', 90+4'; Duda (yellow card) 77'; Belahyane (yellow card) 90+1'	Report	Raspadori (yellow card) 89'	Stadium: Stadio Marcantonio Bentegodi; Attendance: 20,027; Referee: Matteo Marchetti

26 August 2024 2	Hellas Verona	0–3	Juventus	Verona
20:45 CEST (UTC+2)	Tchatchoua (yellow card) 52'; Duda (yellow card) 52'	Report	Vlahović 28', 53' (pen.); Savona 39'	Stadium: Stadio Marcantonio Bentegodi; Attendance: 29,575; Referee: Antonio Giua

1 September 2024 3	Genoa	0–2	Hellas Verona	Genoa
18:30 CEST (UTC+2)	Frendrup (yellow card) 40'; De Winter (yellow card) 49'	Report	Suslov (yellow card) 20'; Dawidowicz (yellow card) 32'; Harroui (yellow card) 45+2'; Tchatchoua 55'; Tengstedt 64' (pen.), (yellow card) 65'; Belahyane (yellow card) 77'; Duda (yellow card) 79'	Stadium: Stadio Luigi Ferraris; Attendance: 30,747; Referee: Giovanni Ayroldi

15 September 2024 4	Lazio	2–1	Hellas Verona	Rome
15:00 CEST (UTC+2)	Dia 5'; Castellanos 20'; Rovella (yellow card) 27'; Gila (yellow card) 44'	Report	Tengstedt 7'; Tchatchoua (yellow card) 30'; Tengstedt (yellow card) 84'	Stadium: Stadio Olimpico; Attendance: 34,000; Referee: Luca Zufferli

20 September 2024 5	Hellas Verona	2–3	Torino	Verona
20:45 CEST (UTC+2)	Kastanos 12', (yellow card) 58'; Coppola (yellow card) 18'; Dawidowicz (red card) 21'; Mosquera 90+3'; Livramento (yellow card) 90+3'	Report	Sanabria 10', (penalty missed) 23'; Zapata 33'; Adams 79'; Dembélé (yellow card) 90+3'	Stadium: Stadio Marcantonio Bentegodi; Referee: Livio Marinelli

29 September 2024 6	Como	3–2	Hellas Verona	Como
15:00 CEST (UTC+2)	Cutrone 43', 72'; Sergi Roberto (yellow card) 51'; Perrone (yellow card) 81'; Belotti 89'	Report	Belahyane (yellow card) 48'; Lazović 53' (pen.); Suslov (yellow card) 61' (yellow-red card) 64'; Coppola (yellow card) 75'; Mosquera (yellow card) 84'; Lambourde 90+4'	Stadium: Stadio Giuseppe Sinigaglia; Referee: Antonio Giua

4 October 2024 7	Hellas Verona	2–1	Venezia	Verona
20:45 CEST (UTC+2)	Tengstedt 9'; Bradarić (yellow card) 21'; Duda (yellow card) 76'; Joronen 81' (o.g.); Magnani (yellow card) 90+3'	Report	Oristanio 2'	Stadium: Stadio Marcantonio Bentegodi; Attendance: 25,979; Referee: Marco Guida

21 October 2024 8	Hellas Verona	0–3	Monza	Verona
20:45 CEST (UTC+2)	Tchatchoua (yellow card) 35'; Ghilardi (yellow card) 44'; Duda (yellow card) 53'	Report	Mota 9', 74'; Carboni (yellow card) 41'; Caprari (yellow card) 72'; Bianco 79'	Stadium: Stadio Marcantonio Bentegodi; Attendance: 24,854; Referee: Federico Dionisi

26 October 2024 9	Atalanta	6–1	Hellas Verona	Bergamo
20:45 CEST (UTC+2)	de Roon 6'; Retegui 9', 58'; De Ketelaere 14'; Lookman 29', 34'	Report	Bradarić (yellow card) 16'; Sarr 42'	Stadium: Gewiss Stadium; Referee: Ermanno Feliciani

29 October 2024 10	Lecce	1–0	Hellas Verona	Lecce
18:30 CEST (UTC+2)	Guilbert (yellow card) 32'; Dorgu 51'	Report	Belahyane (yellow card) 26' (yellow-red card) 82'; Tchatchoua (red card) 40'; Serdar (yellow card) 56'	Stadium: Stadio Via del Mare; Referee: Maurizio Mariani

3 November 2024 11	Hellas Verona	3–2	Roma	Verona
18:30 CEST (UTC+2)	Tengstedt 13'; Magnani 34'; Suslov (yellow card) 47'; Magnani (yellow card) 80'; Harroui 88'; Livramento (red card) 90+5'	Report	Soulé 28'; Svilar (yellow card) 35'; Dovbyk 53'; Kouadio Koné (yellow card) 80'	Stadium: Stadio Marcantonio Bentegodi; Attendance: 28,185; Referee: Matteo Marcenario

10 November 2024 12	Fiorentina	3–1	Hellas Verona	Florence
15:00 CEST (UTC+2)	Kean 4', 59', 90+2'; Kean (yellow card) 90+3'	Report	Serdar 18'; Coppola (yellow card) 35'; Serdar (yellow card) 54'	Stadium: Stadio Artemio Franchi; Referee: Luca Zufferli

23 November 2024 13	Hellas Verona	0–5	Internazionale	Verona
15:00 CEST (UTC+2)	Dawidowicz (yellow card) 33'; Belahyane (yellow card) 55'	Report	Correa 17'; Thuram 22', 25'; De Vrij 31'; Bisseck 41'; Arnautovic (yellow card) 90+2'	Stadium: Stadio Marcantonio Bentegodi; Attendance: 27,141; Referee: Andrea Colombo

29 October 2024 14	Cagliari	1–0	Hellas Verona	Cagliari
20:45 CEST (UTC+2)	Marin (yellow card) 27'; Piccoli 75'	Report	Coppola (yellow card) 81'; Lambourde (yellow card) 89'	Stadium: Unipol Domus; Referee: Maurizio Mariani

8 December 2024 15	Hellas Verona	1–4	Empoli	Verona
15:00 CEST (UTC+2)	Silva (yellow card) 12'; Tengstedt 35'; Ghilardi (yellow card) 40'	Report	Esposito 16', 19'; Cacace 32'; Colombo 42'; Maleh (yellow card) 74'; Henderson (yellow card) 90+2'	Stadium: Stadio Marcantonio Bentegodi; Attendance: 23,949; Referee: Marco Di Bello

15 December 2024 16	Parma	2–3	Hellas Verona	Parma
15:00 CEST (UTC+2)	Sohm 19', 90'; Hernani (yellow card) 38'	Report	Coppola 5'; Coppola (yellow card) 40'; Faraoni (yellow card) 41'; Sarr 57'; Duda (yellow card) 63'; Mosquera 75'	Stadium: Stadio Ennio Tardini; Referee: Simone Sozza

20 December 2024 17	Hellas Verona	0–1	Milan	Verona
20:45 CEST (UTC+2)	Dawidowicz (yellow card) 35'	Report	Royal (yellow card) 25'; Reijnders 56'	Stadium: Stadio Marcantonio Bentegodi; Attendance: 23,635; Referee: Livio Marinelli

30 December 2024 18	Bologna	2–3	Hellas Verona	Bologna
20:45 CEST (UTC+2)	Domínguez 20', 58'; Pobega (red card) 51'; Castro (yellow card) 85'; Lucumi (yellow card) 87'	Report	Sarr 38'; Dawidowicz (yellow card) 44'; Tengstedt 47'; Suslov (yellow card) 54'; Coppola (yellow card) 57'; Ghilardi (yellow card) 62'; Tchatchoua (yellow card) 68'; Castro 88' (o.g.)	Stadium: Stadio Renato Dall'Ara; Referee: Giovanni Ayroldi

4 January 2025 19	Hellas Verona	0–0	Udinese	Verona
20:45 CEST (UTC+2)	Serdar (yellow card) 29' (yellow-red card) 71'; Tchatchoua (yellow card) 82'	Report	Lucca (yellow card) 34'; Karlstrom (yellow card) 56'	Stadium: Stadio Marcantonio Bentegodi; Attendance: 23,663; Referee: Federico Dionisi

12 January 2025 20	Napoli	2–0	Hellas Verona	Naples
20:45 CEST (UTC+2)	Montipò 8' (o.g.); Zambo Anguissa 61'	Report		Stadium: Stadio Diego Armando Maradona; Referee: Luca Zufferli

19 January 2025 21	Hellas Verona	0–3	Lazio	Verona
18:00 CEST (UTC+2)	Dawidowicz (yellow card) 26'; Coppola (yellow card) 48'; Bradarić (yellow card) 49'; Ghilardi (yellow card) 77'; Duda (yellow card) 78' (yellow-red card)	Report	Gigot 2'; Gigot (yellow card) 14'; Dia 21'; Zaccagni 58'; Tavares (yellow card) 72'	Stadium: Stadio Marcantonio Bentegodi; Attendance: 25,747; Referee: Michael Fabbri

27 January 2025 22	Venezia	1–1	Hellas Verona	Venice
18:30 CEST (UTC+2)	Zerbin 28'; Pohjanpalo (yellow card) 47'	Report	Kastanos (yellow card) 62'; Tchatchoua 76'	Stadium: Stadio Pier Luigi Penzo; Referee: Gianluca Manganiello

1 February 2025 23	Monza	0–1	Hellas Verona	Monza
15:00 CEST (UTC+2)	Izzo (yellow card) 56'; Martins (yellow card) 87'	Report	Leković 13' (o.g.); Mosquera (yellow card) 29'; Niasse (yellow card) 57'; Bradarić (yellow card) 80'	Stadium: Stadio Brianteo; Referee: Davide Massa

8 February 2025 24	Hellas Verona	0–5	Atalanta	Verona
15:00 CEST (UTC+2)	Niasse (yellow card) 16'; Ghilardi (yellow card) 42'	Report	Retegui 21', 25', 44', 56'; Éderson 37'; Sulemana (yellow card) 80'	Stadium: Stadio Marcantonio Bentegodi; Attendance: 20,872; Referee: Simone Sozza

15 February 2025 25	Milan	1–0	Hellas Verona	Milan
18:30 CEST (UTC+2)	Musah (yellow card) 16'; Jiménez (yellow card) 59'; Giménez 75'; Giménez (yellow card) 79'	Report	Coppola (yellow card) 11'; Niasse (yellow card) 21'; Bradaric (yellow card) 43'; Duda (yellow card) 50'	Stadium: San Siro; Referee: Matteo Marchetti

23 February 2025 26	Hellas Verona	1–0	Fiorentina	Verona
15:00 CEST (UTC+2)	Duda (yellow card) 40'; Oyegoke (yellow card) 88'; Bernede 90+5'	Report	Folorunsho (yellow card) 51'; Richardson (yellow card) 70'; Cataldi (yellow card) 90+7'	Stadium: Stadio Marcantonio Bentegodi; Referee: Marco Di Bello

3 March 2025 27	Juventus	2–0	Hellas Verona	Turin
20:45 CEST (UTC+2)	Kelly (yellow card) 63'; Thuram 72'; Koopmeiners 90'	Report		Stadium: Allianz Stadium; Referee: Matteo Marchetti

9 March 2025 28	Hellas Verona	1–2	Bologna	Verona
12:30 CEST (UTC+2)	Valentini (yellow card) 10' (yellow-red card) 70'; Suslov (yellow card) 57'; Mosquera 80'	Report	Odgaard 40'; Moro (yellow card) 41'; Cambiaghi 78'	Stadium: Stadio Marcantonio Bentegodi; Attendance: 24,612; Referee: Antonio Rapuano

15 March 2025 29	Udinese	0–1	Hellas Verona	Udine
15:00 CEST (UTC+2)	Kristensen (yellow card) 19'; Bijol (yellow card) 50'; Solet (yellow card) 70'; Bravo (yellow card) 79'; Atta (yellow card) 86'	Report	Ghilardi (yellow card) 59'; Duda 72'; Kastanos (yellow card) 89'	Stadium: Bluenergy Stadium; Referee: Giovanni Ayroldi

31 March 2025 30	Hellas Verona	0–0	Parma	Verona
18:30 CEST (UTC+2)	Dawidowicz (yellow card) 65'; Bradarić (yellow card) 71'	Report	Delprato (yellow card) 71'	Stadium: Marcantonio Bentegodi; Attendance: 22.706; Referee: Juan Luca Sacchi

6 April 2025 31	Torino	1–1	Hellas Verona	Turin
15:00 CEST (UTC+2)	Gineitis (yellow card) 55'; Ché Adams (penalty missed) 62'; Elmas 67'; Ricci (red card) 86'	Report	Amin Sarr 64'; Livramento (yellow card) 75'	Stadium: Olimpico; Attendance: 25,479; Referee: Kevin Bonacina

=== Coppa Italia ===
10 August 2024 First round	Hellas Verona	1–2	Cesena	Verona
18:30 CEST (UTC+2)	Coppola (yellow card) 53'; Magnani (yellow card) 56'; Silva (yellow card) 61'; Tengstedt 75'; Tchatchoua (yellow card) 80'; Duda (yellow card) 90+2'	Report	Kargbo 44'; Shpendi 49'; Francesconi (yellow card) 90+4'	Stadium: Stadio Marcantonio Bentegodi; Attendance: 7,048; Referee: Valerio Crezzini
