= List of Italian football transfers winter 2024–25 =

The 2024–25 Italian football winter transfer window ran from 2 January to 3 February 2025. Some contracts were already signed and announced before the window opening. The page features transfers from or to Serie A and Serie B clubs.

== Transfers ==
All players and clubs without a flag are Italian.

Legend

- Those clubs in Italic indicate that the player already left the team on loan on this or the previous season or a new signing that immediately left the club.

Date	Name	Moving from	Moving to	Fee
1 October 2024	(France) Oumar Solet	Unattached	Udinese	Free (Note: The player's signing was announced in advance, and he will be registered in January.)
30 December 2024	(Paraguay) Diego González	Lazio	(Mexico) Atlas	Loan
2 January 2025	Luca Fiordilino	Venezia	Triestina	Loan
2 January 2025	(Ivory Coast) Jean-Daniel Akpa Akpro	Lazio	Monza	Loan
2 January 2025	(Argentina) Nicolás Valentini	(Argentina) Boca Juniors	Fiorentina	Free
3 January 2025	Davide Grassini	Carrarese	Lecco	Undisclosed
3 January 2025	Giovanni Volpe	Catanzaro	Cerignola	Loan
4 January 2025	(Sweden) Jesper Karlsson	Bologna	Lecce	Loan
5 January 2025	(England) Ben Godfrey	Atalanta	(England) Ipswich Town	Loan
5 January 2025	(Albania) Frédéric Veseli	(Albania) Egnatia	Südtirol	Loan
5 January 2025	Marcello Piras	Catanzaro	Crotone	Loan
7 January 2025	(France) Jean Butez	(Belgium) Antwerp	Como	Undisclosed
7 January 2025	(Spain) Assane Diao	(Spain) Real Betis	Como	Undisclosed
7 January 2025	Alberto Cerri	Como	Salernitana	Loan
7 January 2025	Simone Scuffet	Cagliari	Napoli	Loan
7 January 2025	Elia Caprile	Napoli	Cagliari	Loan
7 January 2025	Luca Belardinelli	Empoli	Südtirol	Loan
7 January 2025	(Finland) Niklas Pyyhtiä	Bologna	Südtirol	Loan
7 January 2025	(Argentina) Lucas Martínez Quarta	Fiorentina	(Argentina) River Plate	Undisclosed
7 January 2025	(Norway) Mathias Fjørtoft Løvik	(Norway) Molde	Parma	Undisclosed
7 January 2025	(Iceland) Hjörtur Hermannsson	Carrarese	(Greece) Volos	Undisclosed
7 January 2025	Giuseppe Panico	Carrarese	Avellino	Undisclosed
8 January 2025	Luis Hasa	Lecce	Napoli	Undisclosed
8 January 2025	Simone Giordano	Sampdoria	Mantova	Undisclosed
8 January 2025	Antonio Pio Iervolino	Taranto	Salernitana	Loan return
8 January 2025	(Romania) Andres Șfaiț	Salernitana	(Romania) Cluj	Undisclosed
8 January 2025	(Guinea) Cheick Condé	(Switzerland) Zürich	Venezia	Undisclosed
8 January 2025	(Sweden) Emmanuel Ekong	Empoli	(Sweden) Malmö	Undisclosed
8 January 2025	Lorenzo Sgarbi	Napoli	Juve Stabia	Loan
9 January 2025	Filippo Neri	Venezia	Campobasso	Loan
9 January 2025	(Argentina) Leandro Chichizola	Parma	Spezia	Undisclosed
9 January 2025	Antonio Raimondo	Bologna	Salernitana	Loan
9 January 2025	Tommaso Corazza	Bologna	Salernitana	Loan
9 January 2025	Stefano Girelli	Sampdoria	Salernitana	Loan
9 January 2025	Gabriele Artistico	Lazio	Cosenza	Loan
9 January 2025	Antonino La Gumina	Sampdoria	Cesena	Loan
9 January 2025	(Netherlands) Sydney van Hooijdonk	Cesena	(Netherlands) NAC Breda	Undisclosed
9 January 2025	(Lithuania) Marius Adamonis	Catania	Südtirol	Loan
9 January 2025	(Albania) Cristian Shiba	Südtirol	Arzignano	Loan
10 January 2025	Richard Marcone	Turris	Parma	Undisclosed
10 January 2025	(Uruguay) Joaquín Sosa	Bologna	Reggiana	Loan
10 January 2025	(France) Bianay Balcot	Torino	Triestina	Loan
10 January 2025	(Georgia (country)) Luka Lochoshvili	Cremonese	Salernitana	Loan
10 January 2025	(Norway) Egil Selvik	(Norway) Haugesund	Udinese	Free
10 January 2025	(France) Enzo Le Fée	Roma	(England) Sunderland	Loan
10 January 2025	Davide Di Quinzio	Pisa	Pavia	Free
10 January 2025	Pietro Beruatto	Pisa	Sampdoria	Loan
10 January 2025	(Slovenia) Lovro Štubljar	Empoli	(Slovenia) Domžale	Loan
11 January 2025	(Denmark) Philip Billing	(England) Bournemouth	Napoli	Loan
11 January 2025	Michael Folorunsho	Napoli	Fiorentina	Loan
12 January 2025	(France) Maxence Caqueret	(France) Lyon	Como	Undisclosed
12 January 2025	(Denmark) Magnus Kofod Andersen	Venezia	(Czech Republic) Sparta Prague	Undisclosed
13 January 2025	(Brazil) Bruno Bertinato	Venezia	(Brazil) Portuguesa	Undisclosed
13 January 2025	(Germany) Arijon Ibrahimović	(Germany) Bayern Munich	Lazio	Loan
13 January 2025	(Denmark) Henrik Meister	(France) Rennais	Pisa	Loan
14 January 2025	Alessandro Vogliacco	Genoa	Parma	Loan
14 January 2025	(Argentina) Juan Guasone	(Argentina) Estudiantes	Salernitana	Loan
15 January 2025	(Greece) Ilias Koutsoupias	Catanzaro	Frosinone	Loan
15 January 2025	(Albania) Dario Daka	Lecce	Trapani	Undisclosed
15 January 2025	(Portugal) Alberto Costa	(Portugal) Vitória de Guimarães	Juventus	€12.5M
15 January 2025	(France) Woyo Coulibaly	Parma	(England) Leicester	Undisclosed
15 January 2025	(Senegal) M'Baye Niang	Unattached	Sampdoria	Free
15 January 2025	Francesco Conti	Sampdoria	Rimini	Loan
15 January 2025	Daniel Theiner	Südtirol	Carpi	Loan
15 January 2025	Mario Gargiulo	Foggia	Cosenza	Undisclosed
15 January 2025	Justin Kumi	Sassuolo	Reggiana	Loan
16 January 2025	Fabrizio Caligara	Sassuolo	Salernitana	Loan
16 January 2025	(Denmark) Sebastian Otoa	(Denmark) AaB	Genoa	Undisclosed
16 January 2025	(Republic of Ireland) James Abankwah	Udinese	(England) Watford	Loan
16 January 2025	Federico Barba	Como	(Switzerland) Sion	Undisclosed
16 January 2025	(Denmark) Andreas Jungdal	Cremonese	(Belgium) Westerlo	Loan
16 January 2025	Giacomo Drago	Südtirol	Cremonese	Loan
16 January 2025	(Nigeria) Orji Okwonkwo	Bologna	Cittadella	Loan
17 January 2025	Danilo Quaranta	Ascoli	Juve Stabia	Undisclosed
17 January 2025	Alessandro Capello	Carrarese	Arezzo	Undisclosed
17 January 2025	Michele Camporese	Cosenza	Milan Futuro	Undisclosed
17 January 2025	(Georgia (country)) Khvicha Kvaratskhelia	Napoli	(France) Paris Saint-Germain	Undisclosed
17 January 2025	(Serbia) Stefan Leković	(Serbia) Red Star Belgrade	Monza	Loan
17 January 2025	Ludovico Gelmi	Atalanta U23	Catanzaro	Loan
17 January 2025	Andrea Dini	Catanzaro	Catania	Undisclosed
18 January 2025	Alessio Zerbin	Napoli	Venezia	Loan
18 January 2025	Giacomo Quagliata	Cremonese	Catanzaro	Loan
18 January 2025	(Argentina) Marco Pellegrino	Milan	(Argentina) Huracán	Loan
18 January 2025	(Argentina) Luka Romero	Milan	(Mexico) Cruz Azul	Undisclosed
19 January 2025	(England) Dele Alli	Unattached	Como	Free
20 January 2025	(Ivory Coast) Maxwel Cornet	(England) West Ham	Genoa	Loan
20 January 2025	(Nigeria) David Ankeye	Genoa	(Romania) Rapid București	Loan
20 January 2025	(Denmark) Laurs Skjellerup	(Sweden) Göteborg	Sassuolo	Undisclosed
20 January 2025	(France) Andy Pelmard	Lecce	(France) Clermont	Loan return
20 January 2025	(Ghana) Raymond Asante	Udinese	(Belgium) Charleroi	Undisclosed (Note: The player already played for his new club in 2024–25 season, the deal turned from temporary to definitive.)
21 January 2025	(Australia) Mathew Ryan	Roma	(France) Lens	Undisclosed
22 January 2025	(Bosnia and Herzegovina) Milan Đurić	Monza	Parma	Undisclosed
22 January 2025	(Brazil) Paulo Azzi	Cagliari	Cremonese	Undisclosed
22 January 2025	Nicholas Bonfanti	Pisa	Bari	Loan
22 January 2025	(Norway) Markus Solbakken	(Czech Republic) Sparta Prague	Pisa	Loan
22 January 2025	(Guinea-Bissau) Fali Candé	(France) Metz	Venezia	Loan
22 January 2025	(Poland) Mateusz Wieteska	Cagliari	(Greece) PAOK	Loan
22 January 2025	(Denmark) Oliver Christensen	Fiorentina	Salernitana	Loan
22 January 2025	Matteo Cardinali	Latina	Cittadella	Undisclosed
23 January 2025	(Netherlands) Devyne Rensch	(Netherlands) Ajax	Roma	Undisclosed
23 January 2025	(Netherlands) Tijs Velthuis	(Netherlands) Sparta Rotterdam	Sassuolo	Loan
23 January 2025	(Sweden) Jacob Ondrejka	(Belgium) Antwerp	Parma	Undisclosed
23 January 2025	(France) Randal Kolo Muani	(France) Paris Saint-Germain	Juventus	Loan
23 January 2025	Leonardo Sernicola	Cremonese	Pisa	Loan
24 January 2025	Pierluigi Gollini	Atalanta	Roma	Undisclosed
24 January 2025	Michael Kayode	Fiorentina	(England) Brentford	Loan
24 January 2025	(France) Rémi Oudin	Lecce	Sampdoria	Loan
24 January 2025	Marco Curto	Como	Sampdoria	Loan
24 January 2025	Kevin Miranda	Sassuolo	Monopoli	Loan
24 January 2025	Francesco Folino	Juve Stabia	Cremonese	Undisclosed
24 January 2025	Filippo Melegoni	Genoa	Carrarese	Undisclosed
24 January 2025	(England) Kyle Walker	(England) Manchester City	Milan	Loan
24 January 2025	(Ghana) Bright Gyamfi	Cosenza	Messina	Undisclosed
24 January 2025	(Romania) Rareș Ilie	(France) Nice	Catanzaro	Undisclosed
25 January 2025	(Poland) Kacper Urbański	Bologna	Monza	Loan
25 January 2025	(Poland) Patryk Peda	Palermo	Juve Stabia	Loan
26 January 2025	(United States) Nicholas Gioacchini	Como	(Greece) Asteras Tripolis	Undisclosed
26 January 2025	Flavio Paoletti	(Turkey) Karagümrük	Mantova	Free
27 January 2025	Giorgio Altare	Venezia	Sampdoria	18-month loan
27 January 2025	(Iraq) Ali Jasim	Como	(Netherlands) Almere	Loan
27 January 2025	(Portugal) Renato Veiga	(England) Chelsea	Juventus	Loan
28 January 2025	(Switzerland) Benjamin Siegrist	(Romania) Rapid București	Genoa	Loan
28 January 2025	(Republic of Ireland) Ed McJannet	Lecce	Audace Cerignola	Loan
28 January 2025	Nicola Dalmonte	Salernitana	Catania	Loan
28 January 2025	(Slovenia) Jan Mlakar	Pisa	(Croatia) Hajduk Split	Loan
28 January 2025	(Spain) Pablo Marí	Monza	Fiorentina	Undisclosed
28 January 2025	(England) Daniel Oyegoke	(Scotland) Hearts	Verona	Undisclosed
28 January 2025	Giangiacomo Magnani	Verona	Palermo	Undisclosed
28 January 2025	(Portugal) Danilo Veiga	(Portugal) Estrela Amadora	Lecce	Undisclosed
28 January 2025	(Portugal) Tiago Gabriel	(Portugal) Estrela Amadora	Lecce	Undisclosed
28 January 2025	Alessandro Marcandalli	Genoa	Venezia	Loan
29 January 2025	(Argentina) Tomás Palacios	Inter	Monza	Loan
29 January 2025	(Equatorial Guinea) José Machín	Monza	(Spain) Cartagena	Loan
29 January 2025	(Spain) Joselito	Verona	Perugia	Undisclosed
29 January 2025	(Cameroon) Enzo Ebosse	Udinese	(Poland) Jagiellonia	Loan
29 January 2025	(Austria) Franz Stolz	Genoa	(Romania) Rapid București	Loan
29 January 2025	(Spain) Kike Pérez	(Spain) Valladolid	Venezia	Undisclosed
29 January 2025	(Slovenia) Žan Jevšenak	Pisa	(Portugal) Oliveirense	Loan
29 January 2025	(Bulgaria) Adrian Raychev	Pisa	Vis Pesaro	Loan
29 January 2025	Riccardo Bassanini	Pisa	Giana Erminio	Loan
29 January 2025	Andrea Seculin	Trapani	Modena	Loan
29 January 2025	(Sweden) Arvid Brorsson	(Sweden) Mjällby	Monza	Undisclosed
30 January 2025	(North Macedonia) Eljif Elmas	(Germany) RB Leipzig	Torino	Loan
30 January 2025	(Cameroon) Jean Onana	(Turkey) Beşiktaş	Genoa	Loan
30 January 2025	Marco Silvestri	Sampdoria	Empoli	Undisclosed
30 January 2025	Samuele Perisan	Empoli	Sampdoria	Loan
30 January 2025	(Norway) Egil Selvik	Udinese	(England) Watford	Undisclosed
30 January 2025	Mario Ravasio	Cittadella	Arezzo	Undisclosed
30 January 2025	Emmanuele Matino	Bari	Cittadella	Loan
30 January 2025	(Cameroon) Jean-Pierre Nsame	Como	(Switzerland) St. Gallen	Loan
31 January 2025	(France) Jonathan Ikoné	Fiorentina	Como	Loan
31 January 2025	(Republic of Ireland) Festy Ebosele	Udinese	(Turkey) Başakşehir	Undisclosed
31 January 2025	Vincenzo Fiorillo	Salernitana	Carrarese	Loan
31 January 2025	(Bosnia and Herzegovina) Dario Šarić	Palermo	Cesena	Loan
31 January 2025	(France) Stredair Appuah	Palermo	(France) Valenciennes	Loan
31 January 2025	(France) Issiaka Kamate	Inter	Modena	Loan
31 January 2025	Giuseppe Sibilli	Bari	Sampdoria	Loan
31 January 2025	Fabrizio Paghera	Brescia	SPAL	Undisclosed
31 January 2025	(Spain) Mario Hermoso	Roma	(Germany) Bayer Leverkusen	Loan
31 January 2025	(Senegal) Cheikh Niasse	(Switzerland) Young Boys	Verona	Loan
31 January 2025	(Spain) Álex Valle	(Spain) Barcelona B	Como	Loan
31 January 2025	Gaetano Castrovilli	Lazio	Monza	Loan
31 January 2025	(Peru) Gianluca Lapadula	Cagliari	Spezia	Undisclosed
31 January 2025	(Iceland) Mikael Egill Ellertsson	Venezia	Genoa	Undisclosed
31 January 2025	(Iceland) Mikael Egill Ellertsson	Genoa	Venezia	Loan
31 January 2025	(Sierra Leone) Augustus Kargbo	Cesena	(England) Blackburn	Undisclosed
31 January 2025	Luca Garritano	Frosinone	Cosenza	Undisclosed
31 January 2025	(Portugal) Herculano Nabian	Empoli	(Spain) Mérida	Loan
31 January 2025	Antonio Pio Iervolino	Salernitana	(Malta) Żabbar St. Patrick	Loan
31 January 2025	Valerio Crespi	Südtirol	Feralpisalò	Loan
31 January 2025	Andrea Cagnano	Südtirol	Avellino	Loan
31 January 2025	Gabriele Gori	Avellino	Südtirol	Loan
1 February 2025	(Canada) Tajon Buchanan	Inter	(Spain) Villarreal	Loan
1 February 2025	(Uruguay) Gastón Pereiro	Genoa	Bari	Undisclosed
1 February 2025	Daniel Maldini	Monza	Atalanta	Undisclosed
1 February 2025	(Germany) Elijah Scott	(Germany) VfB Stuttgart	Lecce	Undisclosed
1 February 2025	(Serbia) Uroš Račić	Sassuolo	(Portugal) Braga	Loan
1 February 2025	Luca D'Andrea	Sassuolo	Brescia	Loan
1 February 2025	(Poland) Nicola Zalewski	Roma	Inter	Loan
1 February 2025	Cristian Buonaiuto	Cremonese	Padova	Undisclosed
1 February 2025	(Brazil) Arthur Melo	Juventus	(Spain) Girona	Loan
2 February 2025	Cesare Casadei	(England) Chelsea	Torino	Undisclosed
2 February 2025	(Ivory Coast) Konan N'Dri	(Belgium) OH Leuven	Lecce	Undisclosed
2 February 2025	(Denmark) Patrick Dorgu	Lecce	(England) Manchester United	Undisclosed
2 February 2025	(Spain) Álvaro Morata	Milan	(Turkey) Galatasaray	12-month loan
2 February 2025	(Republic of the Congo) Silvère Ganvoula	(Switzerland) Young Boys	Monza	Undisclosed
3 February 2025	(Ivory Coast) Christian Kouamé	Fiorentina	Empoli	Loan
3 February 2025	(Finland) Henri Salomaa	Lecce	Lucchese	Loan
3 February 2025	Michele Carboni	Cagliari	Torres	Loan
3 February 2025	Fabio Abiuso	Modena	Sampdoria	Loan
3 February 2025	(England) Samuel Iling-Junior	Bologna	(England) Aston Villa	Loan return
3 February 2025	(Austria) Stefan Posch	Bologna	Atalanta	Loan
3 February 2025	Davide Calabria	Milan	Bologna	Loan
3 February 2025	Semuel Pizzignacco	Feralpisalò	Monza	Undisclosed
3 February 2025	(Norway) Emil Bohinen	Genoa	Frosinone	Loan
3 February 2025	(Belgium) Mats Lemmens	Lecce	(Belgium) RWDM	Loan
3 February 2025	(Argentina) Nicolás Valentini	Fiorentina	Verona	Loan
3 February 2025	(Lithuania) Edgaras Dubickas	Pisa	Juve Stabia	Loan
3 February 2025	(Mexico) Santiago Giménez	(Netherlands) Feyenoord	Milan	Undisclosed
3 February 2025	Davide Diaw	Monza	Cittadella	Undisclosed
3 February 2025	Nicolò Zaniolo	(Turkey) Galatasaray	Fiorentina	Loan
3 February 2025	(Finland) Joel Pohjanpalo	Venezia	Palermo	Undisclosed
3 February 2025	(Spain) Estanis Pedrola	Sampdoria	Bologna	Loan
3 February 2025	Francesco Gelli	Frosinone	Cremonese	Loan
3 February 2025	Gianluca Di Chiara	Parma	Frosinone	Undisclosed
3 February 2025	(Ivory Coast) Ben Lhassine Kone	Como	Frosinone	Loan
3 February 2025	Marco Sala	Como	Lecce	Loan
3 February 2025	Luca Mazzitelli	Como	Sassuolo	Loan
3 February 2025	Emil Audero	Como	Palermo	Loan
3 February 2025	(Greece) Anastasios Douvikas	(Spain) Celta Vigo	Como	Undisclosed
3 February 2025	(Spain) Mateo Pellegrino	(Argentina) Vélez Sarsfield	Parma	Undisclosed
3 February 2025	(Spain) Anass Salah-Eddine	(Netherlands) Twente	Roma	Undisclosed
3 February 2025	(Algeria) Ismaël Bennacer	Milan	(France) Olympique Marseille	Loan
3 February 2025	(Paraguay) Hugo Cuenca	Milan	Genoa	Undisclosed
3 February 2025	(Switzerland) Noah Okafor	Milan	Napoli	Loan
3 February 2025	Kevin Zeroli	Milan	Monza	Loan
3 February 2025	(France) Warren Bondo	Monza	Milan	Undisclosed
3 February 2025	Riccardo Sottil	Fiorentina	Milan	Loan
3 February 2025	Giacomo Manzari	Bari	Carrarese	Loan
3 February 2025	Andrea Belotti	Como	(Portugal) Benfica	Loan
3 February 2025	(Sweden) Samuel Dahl	Roma	(Portugal) Benfica	Loan
3 February 2025	(France) Lucas Gourna-Douath	(Austria) Salzburg	Roma	Loan
3 February 2025	(Netherlands) Anass Salah-Eddine	(Netherlands) Twente	Roma	Undisclosed
3 February 2025	(Denmark) Victor Nelsson	(Turkey) Galatasaray	Roma	Loan
3 February 2025	(Denmark) Oliver Provstgaard	(Denmark) Vejle	Lazio	Undisclosed
3 February 2025	(Morocco) Reda Belahyane	Verona	Lazio	Undisclosed
3 February 2025	(Argentina) Juan Manuel Cruz	Verona	Cosenza	Loan
3 February 2025	(Belgium) Sekou Diawara	Udinese	Lucchese	Loan
3 February 2025	(Poland) Jan Żuberek	Inter	Avellino	Loan
3 February 2025	Alessandro Fontanarosa	Inter	Carrarese	Loan
3 February 2025	Aaron Ciammaglichella	Torino	Ternana	Loan
3 February 2025	(Kosovo) Mërgim Vojvoda	Torino	Como	Undisclosed
3 February 2025	(France) Amine Salama	(France) Reims	Torino	Loan
3 February 2025	Antonio Barreca	Sampdoria	Südtirol	Undisclosed
3 February 2025	Alessio Cragno	Monza	Sampdoria	Undisclosed
3 February 2025	(Croatia) Stipe Vulikić	Sampdoria	Modena	Loan
3 February 2025	Simone Leonardi	Sampdoria	Rimini	Loan
3 February 2025	Nicola Ravaglia	Sampdoria	Carrarese	Loan
3 February 2025	Niccolò Chiorra	Carrarese	Sampdoria	Loan
3 February 2025	Kevin Bonifazi	Bologna	Sassuolo	Loan
3 February 2025	Simone Verdi	Como	Sassuolo	Loan
3 February 2025	Flavio Russo	Sassuolo	Cesena	Loan
3 February 2025	(France) Janis Antiste	Sassuolo	(Germany) 1. FC Nürnberg	Loan
3 February 2025	Antonio Candela	Venezia	(Spain) Valladolid	Loan
3 February 2025	(Croatia) Mirko Marić	Monza	Venezia	Loan
3 February 2025	(Romania) Ionuț Radu	Inter	Venezia	Undisclosed
3 February 2025	(Czech Republic) Daniel Fila	(Czech Republic) Slavia Prague	Venezia	Undisclosed
3 February 2025	(Portugal) Dani Silva	Verona	(Denmark) Midtjylland	Undisclosed
3 February 2025	(Belgium) Ayanda Sishuba	Verona	(France) Rennais	Undisclosed
3 February 2025	Christian Corradi	Verona	Catanzaro	Loan
3 February 2025	(Denmark) Tobias Slotsager	(Denmark) Odense	Verona	Undisclosed
3 February 2025	(France) Antoine Bernède	(Switzerland) Lausanne	Verona	Loan
3 February 2025	(England) Lloyd Kelly	(England) Newcastle United	Juventus	Loan
3 February 2025	Nicolò Fagioli	Juventus	Fiorentina	Loan
3 February 2025	Cher Ndour	(France) Paris Saint-Germain	Fiorentina	Undisclosed
3 February 2025	Cristiano Biraghi	Fiorentina	Torino	Loan
3 February 2025	Enrico Brignola	Catanzaro	Ternana	Undisclosed
3 February 2025	Umberto Morleo	Catanzaro	Sorrento	Loan
3 February 2025	Bruno Verrengia	Potenza	Catanzaro	Undisclosed
3 February 2025	Bruno Verrengia	Catanzaro	Potenza	Loan
3 February 2025	(Croatia) Ivan Smolčić	(Croatia) Rijeka	Como	Undisclosed
3 February 2025	Tommaso Milanese	Cremonese	Carrarese	Loan
3 February 2025	Tommaso Maressa	Novara	Carrarese	Undisclosed
3 February 2025	Ernesto Torregrossa	Salernitana	Carrarese	Undisclosed
3 February 2025	Filippo Falco	Carrarese	Campobasso	Undisclosed
3 February 2025	Riccardo Palmieri	Carrarese	Cittadella	Undisclosed
3 February 2025	Simone Branca	Cittadella	Milan Futuro	Undisclosed
3 February 2025	Alessio Castellini	Catania	Pisa	Loan
3 February 2025	(Lithuania) Edgaras Dubickas	Pisa	Juve Stabia	Loan
3 February 2025	(Sierra Leone) Yayah Kallon	Verona	Casertana	Loan
3 February 2025	Federico Zuccon	Atalanta	Salernitana	Loan
3 February 2025	Giulio Maggiore	Salernitana	Bari	Loan
3 February 2025	Edoardo Vergani	Pescara	Südtirol	Undisclosed
3 February 2025	Thomas Alberti	Modena	Pescara	Loan
3 February 2025	Luca Strizzolo	Modena	Triestina	Loan
3 February 2025	Ousmane Niang	Modena	Pro Vercelli	Loan
3 February 2025	Daniel Tonoli	Pergolettese	Modena	Undisclosed
3 February 2025	Daniel Tonoli	Modena	Pergolettese	Loan
3 February 2025	Mattia Valoti	Monza	Cremonese	Undisclosed
3 February 2025	Fabio Lucioni	Unattached	Frosinone	Free
3 February 2025	(Romania) Florinel Coman	(Qatar) Al-Gharafa	Cagliari	Loan
3 February 2025	(Portugal) João Félix	(England) Chelsea	Milan	Undisclosed
4 February 2025	(Romania) Alexandru Borbei	Lecce	(Romania) Cluj	Loan
5 February 2025	(Latvia) Raimonds Krollis	Spezia	(Czech Republic) Slovan Liberec	Undisclosed
5 February 2025	(Austria) Marlon Mustapha	Como	(Austria) Altach	Loan
