= 2023–24 Hellas Verona FC season =

Hellas Verona FC
2023–24 season
- Chairman: Maurizio Setti
- Manager: Marco Baroni
- Stadium: Stadio Marcantonio Bentegodi
- Serie A: 13th
- Coppa Italia: Round of 32
- Top goalscorer: League: Cyril Ngonge (6); All: Milan Đurić; Cyril Ngonge (6 each)
Home colours	Away colours	Third colours

The 2023–24 season was Hellas Verona Football Club's 121st season in existence and fifth consecutive season in Serie A. They also competed in the Coppa Italia.

== Players ==
=== First-team squad ===
As of 27 January 2024

Note: Flags indicate national team as defined under FIFA eligibility rules; some limited exceptions apply. Players may hold more than one non-FIFA nationality.

No.	Pos.	Nation	Player
1	GK	ITA	Lorenzo Montipò
4	DF	GER	Koray Günter
6	MF	FRA	Reda Belahyane
7	MF	NED	Elayis Tavsan
8	MF	SRB	Darko Lazović (captain)
9	FW	FRA	Thomas Henry
10	FW	SRB	Stefan Mitrović
11	FW	POL	Karol Świderski (on loan from Charlotte FC)
13	FW	ARG	Juan Manuel Cruz
14	MF	ESP	Joselito
16	GK	ITA	Mattia Chiesa
17	FW	NED	Tijjani Noslin
18	DF	FRA	Fabien Centonze (on loan from Nantes)
19	DF	POR	Rúben Vinagre (on loan from Sporting Lisbon)

No.	Pos.	Nation	Player
21	MF	POR	Dani Silva
22	GK	ITA	Alessandro Berardi
23	DF	ITA	Giangiacomo Magnani (3rd captain)
25	MF	GER	Suat Serdar (on loan from Hertha BSC)
27	DF	POL	Paweł Dawidowicz (vice-captain)
31	MF	SVK	Tomáš Suslov
32	DF	COL	Juan David Cabal
33	MF	SVK	Ondrej Duda
34	GK	ITA	Simone Perilli
37	MF	BRA	Charlys (on loan from Vitória)
38	MF	BEL	Jackson Tchatchoua (on loan from Charleroi)
42	DF	ITA	Diego Coppola
90	MF	ITA	Michael Folorunsho (on loan from Napoli)
99	FW	ITA	Federico Bonazzoli (on loan from Salernitana)

=== Primavera ===
As of 4 January 2023.

Note: Flags indicate national team as defined under FIFA eligibility rules; some limited exceptions apply. Players may hold more than one non-FIFA nationality.

No.	Pos.	Nation	Player
28	MF	ITA	Nicola Patanè
75	MF	ITA	Nicolò Calabrese

No.	Pos.	Nation	Player
80	FW	ITA	Alphadjo Cissè

=== Out on loan ===
As of 10 January 2024.

Note: Flags indicate national team as defined under FIFA eligibility rules; some limited exceptions apply. Players may hold more than one non-FIFA nationality.

No.	Pos.	Nation	Player
—	GK	ITA	Elia Boseggia (at Arzignano until 30 June 2024)
—	DF	ITA	Edoardo Bernardi (at Arzignano until 30 June 2024)
—	DF	ITA	Federico Ceccherini (at Fatih Karagümrük until 30 June 2024)
—	DF	TUR	Mert Çetin (at Ankaragücü until 30 June 2024)
—	DF	ITA	Diego Fornari (at Montebelluna until 30 June 2024)
—	DF	ITA	Daniele Ghilardi (at Sampdoria until 30 June 2024)
—	DF	SUI	Kevin Rüegg (at Basel until 30 June 2024)
—	MF	ITA	Davide Bragantini (at Mantova until 30 June 2024)
—	MF	ITA	Denis Cazzadori (at Arzignano until 30 June 2024)
—	MF	ITA	Bruno Conti (at Monterosi until 30 June 2024)
—	MF	ITA	Christian Pierobon (at Triestina until 30 June 2024)

No.	Pos.	Nation	Player
—	MF	POL	Mateusz Praszelik (at Cosenza until 30 June 2024)
—	FW	SLO	David Flakus Bosilj (at De Graafschap until 30 June 2024)
—	FW	ITA	Federico Caia (at Pergolettese until 30 June 2024)
—	FW	ITA	Mattia Florio (at Pro Sesto until 30 June 2024)
—	FW	SLE	Yayah Kallon (at Bari until 30 June 2024)
—	FW	ITA	Kevin Lasagna (at Fatih Karagümrük until 30 June 2024)
—	FW	POL	Mariusz Stępiński (at Aris Limassol until 30 June 2024)
—	FW	GHA	Philip Yeboah (at Lucchese until 30 June 2024)
—	DF	ITA	Davide Faraoni (at Fiorentina until 30 June 2024)
—	FW	NED	Jayden Braaf (at Fortuna Sittard until 30 June 2024)
—	DF	GER	Koray Günter (at Fatih Karagümrük until 30 June 2024)

== Transfers ==
=== In ===
Pos.	Player	Transferred from	Fee	Date	Source
MF	(Sierra Leone) Yayah Kallon	(Italy) Genoa	€2,800,000	1 July 2023	
MF	(Slovakia) Ondrej Duda	(Germany) 1. FC Köln	€2,700,000	1 July 2023	
FW	(Netherlands) Jayden Braaf	(Germany) Borussia Dortmund II	€1,000,000	2 July 2023	
FW	(Spain) Jordi Mboula	(Spain) RCD Mallorca	Undisclosed	11 July 2023	
FW	(Italy) Riccardo Saponara	(Italy) Fiorentina	Free	21 July 2023	
FW	(Italy) Federico Bonazzoli	(Italy) Salernitana	Loan	10 August 2023	
MF	(Italy) Michael Folorunsho	(Italy) Napoli	Loan	16 August 2023	
MF	(Germany) Suat Serdar	(Germany) Hertha BSC	Loan	22 August 2023	
MF	(Belgium) Jackson Tchatchoua	(Belgium) Royal Charleroi	Loan	31 August 2023	
MF	(Brazil) Charlys Matheus	(Brazil) Vitória Futebol Clube	Loan	1 September 2023	
MF	(Slovakia) Tomáš Suslov	(Netherlands) FC Groningen	Loan	1 September 2023	
FW	(Netherlands) Tijjani Noslin	(Netherlands) Fortuna Sittard	Undisclosed	23 January 2024	
MF	(Netherlands) Elayis Tavsan	(Netherlands) NEC Nijmegen	Undisclosed	23 January 2024	
MF	(Portugal) Dani Silva	(Portugal) Vitória S.C.	Undisclosed	25 January 2024	
MF	(France) Reda Belahyane	(France) Nice	Undisclosed	25 January 2024	
DF	(Portugal) Rúben Vinagre	(Portugal) Sporting Lisbon	Loan	26 January 2024	
FW	(Serbia) Stefan Mitrovic	(Serbia) Red Star Belgrade	Undisclosed	1 February 2024	
DF	(France) Fabien Centonze	(France) Nantes	Loan	1 February 2024	
FW	(Poland) Karol Swiderski	(United States) Charlotte FC	Loan	1 February 2024	

=== Out ===
Pos.	Player	Transferred to	Fee	Date	Source
MF	(Serbia) Ivan Ilić	(Italy) Torino	€15,700,000	1 July 2023	
FW	(Argentina) Giovanni Simeone	(Italy) Napoli	€12,000,000	1 July 2023	
MF	(Cameroon) Adrien Tameze	(Italy) Torino	Undisclosed	23 July 2023	
DF	(Italy) Federico Ceccherini	(Turkey) Fatih Karagümrük	Loan	15 August 2023	
FW	(Italy) Kevin Lasagna	(Turkey) Fatih Karagümrük	Loan	15 August 2023	
MF	(Italy) Bruno Conti	(Italy) Monterosi	Loan	31 August 2023	
DF	(Ghana) Philip Yeboah	(Italy) Lucchese	Loan	31 August 2023	
FW	(Senegal) Adama Sane	(Malta) Gżira United	Free	31 August 2023	
DF	(Switzerland) Kevin Rüegg	(Switzerland) Basel	Loan	6 September 2023	
DF	(Sweden) Isak Hien	(Italy) Atalanta	€9,000,000	2 January 2024	
MF	(Italy) Filippo Terracciano	(Italy) AC Milan	Undisclosed	8 January 2024	
MF	(Cameroon) Martin Hongla	(Spain) Granada	Undisclosed	12 January 2024	
DF	(Italy) Davide Faraoni	(Italy) Fiorentina	Loan	12 January 2024	
FW	(Belgium) Cyril Ngonge	(Italy) Napoli	€18,000,000	19 January 2024	
DF	(Scotland) Josh Doig	(Italy) Sassuolo	Undisclosed	19 January 2024	
FW	(Bosnia and Herzegovina) Milan Đurić	(Italy) Monza	Undisclosed	26 January 2024	
DF	(Germany) Koray Günter	(Turkey) Fatih Karagümrük	Loan	26 January 2024	
FW	(Italy) Riccardo Saponara	(Turkey) Ankaragücü	Undisclosed	30 January 2024	
FW	(Spain) Jordi Mboula	(Spain) Racing de Santander	Undisclosed	1 February 2024	
DF	(Argentina) Bruno Amione	(Mexico) Santos Laguna	Undisclosed	1 February 2024	
MF	(Australia) Ajdin Hrustic	(Netherlands) Heracles Almelo	Undisclosed	1 February 2024	

== Pre-season and friendlies ==
Win Draw Loss Fixtures

16 July 2023 Friendly	Hellas Verona (Italy)	7–0	(Italy) US Primiero	Primiero, Italy
17:00 UTC+2				Stadium: Centro Sportivo Intercomunale di Mezzano

20 July 2023 Friendly	Hellas Verona (Italy)	3–0	(Italy) Top 22 Dilettanti Verona	Primiero, Italy
17:00 UTC+2				Stadium: Centro Sportivo Intercomunale di Mezzano

23 July 2023 Friendly	Hellas Verona (Italy)	3–0	(Italy) Virtus Verona	Primiero, Italy
17:00 UTC+2		Report		Stadium: Centro Sportivo Intercomunale di Mezzano; Referee: Matteo Gualtieri

29 July 2023 Friendly	Bastia (France)	3–1	(Italy) Hellas Verona	Furiani, France
19:00 UTC+2		Report		Stadium: Stade Armand-Cesari; Referee: Batta

5 August 2023 Friendly	1. FC Heidenheim (Germany)	3–2	(Italy) Hellas Verona	Heidenheim an der Brenz, Germany
15:30 UTC+2	Mainka 11'; Pieringer 49'; Kleindienst 59'	Report	Đurić 4', (yellow card) 26'; Ngonge 25'; Ceccherini (yellow card) 58'	Stadium: Voith-Arena; Attendance: 5,414; Referee: Florian Badstubner

14 October 2023 Friendly	Hellas Verona (Italy)	1–2	(Switzerland) Bellinzona	Peschiera del Garda, Italy
11:00		Report		Stadium: Centro Sportivo "Il Paradiso"

== Competitions ==
=== Overall record ===
Competition	First match	Last match	Starting round	Final position	Record							
Competition	First match	Last match	Starting round	Final position	Pld	W	D	L	GF	GA	GD	Win %
Serie A	19 August 2023	26 May 2024	Matchday 1	13th	38	9	11	18	38	51	−13	23.68
Coppa Italia	12 August 2023	31 October 2023	Round of 64	Round of 32	2	1	0	1	3	3	+0	50.00
Total					40	10	11	19	41	54	−13	25.00

Source: Soccerway

=== Serie A ===
==== League table ====
Pos	Team	Pld	W	D	L	GF	GA	GD	Pts
11	Genoa	38	12	13	13	45	45	0	49
12	Monza	38	11	12	15	39	51	−12	45
13	Hellas Verona	38	9	11	18	38	51	−13	38 (Note: Hellas Verona finished ahead of Lecce on head-to-head points: Hellas Verona 2–2 Lecce, Lecce 0–1 Hellas Verona.)
14	Lecce	38	8	14	16	32	54	−22	38
15	Udinese	38	6	19	13	37	53	−16	37

Source: Serie A
Rules for classification: 1) Points; 2) Tiebreaker for Champions team and third relegated team; 3) Head-to-head points; 4) Head-to-head goal difference; 5) Goal difference; 6) Goals scored; 7) Draw.
(Note: Head-to-head record is used only after all the matches between the teams in question have been played)

==== Results summary ====
Overall								Home						Away					
Pld	W	D	L	GF	GA	GD	Pts	W	D	L	GF	GA	GD	W	D	L	GF	GA	GD
38	9	11	18	38	51	−13	38	6	6	7	23	26	−3	3	5	11	15	25	−10

Source: Serie A

==== Results by round ====
Round	1	2	3	4	5	6	7	8	9	10	11	12	13	14	15	16	17	18	19	20	21	22	23	24	25	26	27	28	29	30	31	32	33	34	35	36	37	38
Ground	A	H	A	H	A	H	A	A	H	A	H	A	H	A	H	A	H	H	A	H	A	H	A	A	H	A	H	A	H	A	H	A	H	A	H	H	A	H
Result	W	W	L	D	L	L	D	L	L	L	L	L	D	D	D	L	W	L	L	W	L	D	L	D	D	L	W	W	L	D	L	D	W	L	W	L	W	D
Position	8	4	7	9	10	14	15	16	16	16	18	19	19	18	19	19	16	17	18	18	18	16	17	18	18	17	17	14	15	15	17	16	15	15	14	14	13	13

Source: Serie A
A = Away; H = Home; W = Win; D = Draw; L = Loss

==== Matches ====
The league fixtures were unveiled on 5 July 2023.

19 August 2023 1	Empoli	0–1	Hellas Verona	Empoli
18:30 CEST (UTC+2)	Cacace (yellow card) 66'; Grassi (yellow card) 68'	Report	Duda (yellow card) 44'; Magnani (yellow card) 58'; Bonazzoli 75'	Stadium: Stadio Carlo Castellani; Attendance: 7,940; Referee: Luca Massimi

26 August 2023 2	Hellas Verona	2–1	Roma	Verona
20:45 CEST (UTC+2)	Duda 4'; Ngonge 45+3'; Dawidowicz (yellow card) 64'; Hien (red card) 84'	Report	Dybala (yellow card) 13'; Aouar 56', (yellow card) 62'; Pellegrini (yellow card) 68'	Stadium: Stadio Marcantonio Bentegodi; Attendance: 23,147; Referee: Daniele Doveri

1 September 2023 3	Sassuolo	3–1	Hellas Verona	Reggio Emilia
18:30 CEST (UTC+2)	Pinamonti 11'; Boloca (yellow card) 29'; Berardi 63', 73' (pen.)	Report	Coppola (yellow card) 42'; Magnani (yellow card) 45+5'; Ngonge 56'; Doig (yellow card) 71'	Stadium: Mapei Stadium – Città del Tricolore; Attendance: 10,356; Referee: Marco Piccinini

18 September 2023 4	Hellas Verona	0–0	Bologna	Verona
20:45 CEST (UTC+2)	Dawidowicz (yellow card) 18'; Faraoni (yellow card) 50'; Serdar (yellow card) 90+3'; Suslov (yellow card) 90+3'	Report	Kristiansen (yellow card) 37'; Posch (yellow card) 73'	Stadium: Stadio Marcantonio Bentegodi; Attendance: 18,863; Referee: Federico La Penna

23 September 2023 5	Milan	1–0	Hellas Verona	Milan
15:00 CEST (UTC+2)	Leão 8'; Thiaw (yellow card) 24'; Musah (yellow card) 58'; Pulisic (yellow card) 76'; Florenzi (yellow card) 89'	Report	Faraoni (yellow card) 42'; Bonazzoli (yellow card) 55'	Stadium: San Siro; Attendance: 71,070; Referee: Matteo Marchetti

27 September 2023 6	Hellas Verona	0–1	Atalanta	Verona
18:30 CEST (UTC+2)	Ngonge (yellow card) 54'; Folorunsho (yellow card) 68'	Report	Koopmeiners 13'; Éderson (yellow card) 50'; De Roon (yellow card) 62'; Djimsiti (yellow card) 67'; Tolói (yellow card) 77'	Stadium: Stadio Marcantonio Bentegodi; Attendance: 15,936; Referee: Federico Dionisi

2 October 2023 7	Torino	0–0	Hellas Verona	Turin
18:30 CEST (UTC+2)	Tameze (yellow card) 71'	Report	Magnani (yellow card) 9'	Stadium: Stadio Olimpico Grande Torino; Attendance: 19,149; Referee: Ermanno Feliciani

8 October 2023 8	Frosinone	2–1	Hellas Verona	Frosinone
15:00 CEST (UTC+2)	Okoli (yellow card) 30'; Reinier 45+1'; Soulé 66'	Report	Coppola (yellow card) 28'; Duda (yellow card) 39'; Amione (yellow card) 40'; Suslov (yellow card) 79'; Đurić 90+4'	Stadium: Stadio Benito Stirpe; Attendance: 13,033; Referee: Maria Sole Ferrieri Caputi

21 October 2023 9	Hellas Verona	1–3	Napoli	Verona
15:00 CEST (UTC+2)	Magnani (yellow card) 37'; Faraoni (yellow card) 45'; Lazović 60'; Bonazzoli (yellow card) 65'	Report	Politano 27'; Kvaratskhelia 43', 55'; Mário Rui (yellow card) 45'; Lindstrøm (yellow card) 80'	Stadium: Stadio Marcantonio Bentegodi; Attendance: 20,549; Referee: Rosario Abisso

28 October 2023 10	Juventus	1–0	Hellas Verona	Turin
20:45 CEST (UTC+2)	Rugani (yellow card) 40'; Kean (yellow card) 56'; Cambiaso 90+7', (yellow card) 90+8'	Report	Đurić (yellow card) 38'; Folorunsho (yellow card) 50'	Stadium: Juventus Stadium; Attendance: 39,429; Referee: Ermanno Feliciani

5 November 2023 11	Hellas Verona	1–3	Monza	Verona
12:30 CET (UTC+1)	Faraoni (yellow card) 70'; Folorunsho 86'	Report	D'Ambrosio (yellow card) 26'; Colombo 41', 73', (yellow card) 45'; Caldirola 84'	Stadium: Stadio Marcantonio Bentegodi; Attendance: 17,505; Referee: Giuseppe Collu

10 November 2023 12	Genoa	1–0	Hellas Verona	Genoa
20:45 CET (UTC+1)	Drăgușin 44'; Vásquez (yellow card) 49'	Report	Hien (yellow card) 26'; Terracciano (yellow card) 60'; Faraoni (yellow card) 66'; Duda (yellow card) 86'	Stadium: Stadio Luigi Ferraris; Attendance: 30,421; Referee: Daniele Orsato

27 November 2023 13	Hellas Verona	2–2	Lecce	Verona
18:30 CET (UTC+1)	Duda (yellow card) 3'; Ngonge 41'; Đurić 77'	Report	Dorgu (yellow card) 5'; Banda (yellow card) 24'; Oudin 30'; González 69'	Stadium: Stadio Marcantonio Bentegodi; Attendance: 16,730; Referee: Federico La Penna

3 December 2023 14	Udinese	3–3	Hellas Verona	Udine
15:00 CET (UTC+1)	Kabasele 16'; Lucca 30', 72'; Zemura (yellow card) 44'; Payero (yellow card) 45+1'	Report	Đurić (yellow card) 6', (goal) 37' (pen.); Amione (yellow card) 45+4'; Coppola (yellow card) 50'; Ngonge 61', (yellow card) 82'; Henry (yellow card) 89', (goal) 90+7'	Stadium: Stadio Friuli; Attendance: 22,294; Referee: Fabio Maresca

9 December 2023 15	Hellas Verona	1–1	Lazio	Verona
15:00 CET (UTC+1)	Duda (yellow card) 15' (yellow-red card) 77'; Henry 70'	Report	Zaccagni 23'; Marušić (yellow card) 24'; Hysaj (yellow card) 63'; Felipe Anderson (yellow card) 82'; Pedro (yellow card) 90+5'	Stadium: Stadio Marcantonio Bentegodi; Attendance: 28,401; Referee: Giovanni Ayroldi

17 December 2023 16	Fiorentina	1–0	Hellas Verona	Florence
15:00 CET (UTC+1)	Terracciano (yellow card) 2'; Biraghi (yellow card) 36'; Barák (yellow card) 65'; Beltrán 78'	Report	Đurić (penalty missed) 3'; Dawidowicz (yellow card) 67'	Stadium: Stadio Artemio Franchi; Attendance: 26,311; Referee: Maria Sole Ferrieri Caputi

23 December 2023 17	Hellas Verona	2–0	Cagliari	Verona
18:00 CET (UTC+1)	Duda (yellow card) 45'; Ngonge 53', (yellow card) 69'; Suslov (yellow card) 57'; Đurić 90'	Report	Makoumbou (yellow card) 12' (yellow-red card) 51'; Viola (yellow card) 57'; Sulemana (yellow card) 90+3'	Stadium: Stadio Marcantonio Bentegodi; Attendance: 16,716; Referee: Daniele Orsato

30 December 2023 18	Hellas Verona	0–1	Salernitana	Verona
18:00 CET (UTC+1)	Ngonge (yellow card) 38'; Doig (yellow card) 79'	Report	Tchaouna 48'; Łęgowski (yellow card) 72'	Stadium: Stadio Marcantonio Bentegodi; Attendance: 18,181; Referee: Maurizio Mariani

6 January 2024 19	Internazionale	2–1	Hellas Verona	Milan
12:30 CET (UTC+1)	Martínez 13'; Frattesi 90+3'	Report	Henry 74', (penalty missed) 90+10'; Coppola (yellow card) 77'; Suslov (yellow card) 78'; Lazović (red card) 90+5'	Stadium: San Siro; Attendance: 71,691; Referee: Michael Fabbri

13 January 2024 20	Hellas Verona	2–1	Empoli	Verona
18:00 CET (UTC+1)	Đurić 3'; Ngonge 56'; Duda (yellow card) 69' (yellow-red card) 87'; Coppola (yellow card) 77'; Tchatchoua (yellow card) 82'	Report	Żurkowski (yellow card) 58', (goal) 64'; Cambiaghi (yellow card) 78'; Cancellieri (yellow card) 90'	Stadium: Stadio Marcantonio Bentegodi; Attendance: 28,723; Referee: Daniele Doveri

20 January 2024 21	Roma	2–1	Hellas Verona	Rome
20:45 CET (UTC+1)	Lukaku 19'; Pellegrini 25'; Paredes (yellow card) 41'; Llorente (yellow card) 10'	Report	Dawidowicz (yellow card) 52'; Folorunsho (yellow card) 57', (goal) 76'; Đurić (penalty missed) 66'	Stadium: Stadio Olimpico; Attendance: 61,857; Referee: Juan Luca Sacchi

28 January 2024 22	Hellas Verona	1–1	Frosinone	Verona
15:00 CET (UTC+1)	Duda (penalty missed) 37'; Suslov 45+3' (pen.); Serdar (yellow card) 45+4'; Cabal (yellow card) 86'	Report	Harroui (yellow card) 31'; Kaio 58'; Mazzitelli (yellow card) 90+1'	Stadium: Stadio Marcantonio Bentegodi; Attendance: 17,529; Referee: Federico La Penna

4 February 2024 23	Napoli	2–1	Hellas Verona	Naples
15:00 CET (UTC+1)	Mário Rui (yellow card) 46'; Lindstrøm (yellow card) 66'; Lobotka (yellow card) 76'; Dawidowicz 79' (o.g.); Kvaratskhelia 87'	Report	Coppola (yellow card) 33', (goal) 72'; Suslov (yellow card) 54'	Stadium: Stadio Diego Armando Maradona; Attendance: 44,000; Referee: Marco Piccinini

11 February 2024 24	Monza	0–0	Hellas Verona	Monza
15:00 CET (UTC+1)	Bondo (yellow card) 60'	Report	Centonze (yellow card) 58'; Folorunsho (yellow card) 67'	Stadium: Stadio Brianteo; Referee: Davide Massa

17 February 2024 25	Hellas Verona	2–2	Juventus	Verona
18:00 CET (UTC+1)	Folorunsho 11'; Noslin 11'	Report	Vlahovic 28' (pen.); Rabiot 55'	Stadium: Stadio Marcantonio Bentegodi; Attendance: 26,948; Referee: Marco Di Bello

23 February 2024 26	Bologna	2–0	Hellas Verona	Bologna
20:45 CET (UTC+1)	Freuler (yellow card) 20', (goal) 65'; Fabbian 27'; Ferguson (yellow card) 69'	Report	Duda (yellow card) 45+6'; Cabal (yellow card) 79'	Stadium: Stadio Renato Dall'Ara; Attendance: 26,033; Referee: Rosario Abisso

3 March 2024 27	Hellas Verona	1–0	Sassuolo	Verona
12:30 CET (UTC+1)	Dawidowicz (yellow card) 51'; Świderski 79'; Cabal (yellow card) 81'; Serdar (yellow card) 83'; Coppola (yellow card) 89'	Report	Matheus Henrique (yellow card) 47'; Castillejo (yellow card) 72'	Stadium: Stadio Marcantonio Bentegodi; Attendance: 19,338; Referee: Fabio Maresca

10 March 2024 28	Lecce	0–1	Hellas Verona	Lecce
12:30 CET (UTC+1)	Banda (yellow card) 37'; Sansone (yellow card) 79'; Pongračić (yellow card) 90+2'	Report	Folorunsho 17'; Tchatchoua (yellow card) 43'; Silva (yellow card) 84'; Henry (yellow card) 90+2', (red card) 90+7'	Stadium: Stadio Via del mare Attendance: 25,222; Referee: Daniele Chiffi

17 March 2024 29	Hellas Verona	1–3	Milan	Verona
15:00 CET (UTC+1)	Serdar (yellow card) 7'; Noslin 64'	Report	Tomori (yellow card) 30'; Hernandez 44', (yellow card) 45'; Pulisic 50'; Chukwueze 79'; Reijnders (yellow card) 87'	Stadium: Stadio Marcantonio Bentegodi; Attendance: 26,165; Referee: Maurizio Mariani

1 April 2024 30	Cagliari	1–1	Hellas Verona	Cagliari
15:00 CEST (UTC+2)	Sulemana 74'	Report	Duda (yellow card) 27'; Bonazzoli 30'; Magnani (yellow card) 90+3'	Stadium: Unipol Domus; Attendance: 16,285; Referee: Daniele Doveri

7 April 2024 31	Hellas Verona	1–2	Genoa	Verona
18:00 CEST (UTC+2)	Bonazzoli 8'; Centonze (yellow card) 24'; Duda (yellow card) 40'; Serdar (yellow card) 67'	Report	Guðmundsson (yellow card) 25', (goal) 58'; Ekuban 45'	Stadium: Stadio Marcantonio Bentegodi; Attendance: 20,342; Referee: Gianluca Manganiello

15 April 2024 32	Atalanta	2–2	Hellas Verona	Bergamo
20:45 CEST (UTC+2)	Scamacca 13'; Éderson 18'	Report	Suslov (yellow card) 42'; Lazović 56'; Noslin 60'; Silva (yellow card) 83'	Stadium: Gewiss Stadium; Attendance: 14,666; Referee: Juan Luca Sacchi

20 April 2024 33	Hellas Verona	1–0	Udinese	Verona
20:45 CEST (UTC+2)	Serdar (yellow card) 13'; Cabral (yellow card) 14'; Coppola 90+3'	Report	Walace (yellow card) 16'; Samardžić (yellow card) 29'	Stadium: Stadio Marcantonio Bentegodi; Attendance: 27,662; Referee: Marco Guida

27 April 2024 34	Lazio	1–0	Hellas Verona	Rome
20:45 CEST (UTC+2)	Romagnoli (yellow card) 38'; Casale (yellow card) 50'; Luis Alberto (yellow card) 71'; Zaccagni 72', (yellow card) 90+4'	Report	Duda (yellow card) 71'; Cabal (yellow card) 74'; Coppola (yellow card) 86'; Noslin (yellow card) 90+2'	Stadium: Stadio Olimpico; Attendance: 39,000; Referee: Davide Massa

5 May 2024 35	Hellas Verona	2–1	Fiorentina	Verona
15:00 CEST (UTC+2)	Lazović 13' (pen.); Coppola (yellow card) 46'; Noslin 59'; Folorunsho (yellow card) 79'	Report	Castrovilli 42'; Mandragora (yellow card) 77'	Stadium: Stadio Marcantonio Bentegodi; Attendance: 27,821; Referee: Antonio Rapuano

12 May 2024 36	Hellas Verona	1–2	Torino	Verona
15:00 CEST (UTC+2)	Noslin (yellow card) 38'; Magnani (yellow card) 44'; Świderski 67'; Suslov (yellow card) 90+3'; Henry (red card) 90+6'	Report	Savva 77'; Pellegri 83', (yellow card) 90+3'; Linetty (yellow card) 90+4'	Stadium: Stadio Marcantonio Bentegodi; Attendance: 25,964; Referee: Livio Marinelli

20 May 2024 37	Salernitana	1–2	Hellas Verona	Salerno
18:30 CEST (UTC+2)	Sambia (yellow card) 14'; Bašić (yellow card) 71'; Tchaouna (yellow card) 73'; Maggiore 90'	Report	Suslov 22'; Folorunsho 45+3'; Duda (yellow card) 56'; Serdar (yellow card) 73'	Stadium: Stadio Arechi; Attendance: 15,998; Referee: Marco Di Bello

26 May 2024 38	Hellas Verona	2–2	Internazionale	Verona
20:45 CEST (UTC+2)	Noslin 17'; Cabal (yellow card) 30'; Suslov 37'	Report	Arnautović 10', 45+1'; Barella (yellow card) 61'	Stadium: Stadio Marcantonio Bentegodi; Attendance: 22,447; Referee: Luca Zufferli

=== Coppa Italia ===
12 August 2023 Round of 64	Hellas Verona	3–1	Ascoli	Verona
21:00 CEST (UTC+2)	Mboula 2'; Dawidowicz 45+3'; Đurić 47' (pen.)	Report	Masini (yellow card) 12'; Forte 39' (pen.); Šimić (yellow card) 46'	Stadium: Stadio Marcantonio Bentegodi; Attendance: 8,746; Referee: Marco Piccinini

31 October 2023 Round of 32	Bologna	2–0	Hellas Verona	Bologna
21:00 CET (UTC+1)	Moro 41'; Van Hooijdonk 62'	Report	Amione (yellow card) 39'; Serdar (yellow card) 45+1', (red card) 73'	Stadium: Stadio Renato Dall'Ara; Attendance: 11,593; Referee: Federico Dionisi
