= Simone Perilli =

Italian footballer (born 1995)

Personal information
- Date of birth: 7 January 1995 (age 31)
- Place of birth: Rome, Italy
- Height: 1.95 m (6 ft 5 in)
- Position: Goalkeeper

Team information
- Current team: Hellas Verona
- Number: 34

Youth career
- –2006: Lazio
- 2006–2011: Roma
- 2012–2014: Sassuolo

Senior career*
Years	Team	Apps	(Gls)
2014–2015	Sassuolo	0	(0)
2014–2015	→ Pro Patria (loan)	10	(0)
2015–2017	Reggiana	64	(0)
2017–2019	Pordenone	29	(0)
2018–2019	→ Perugia (loan)	0	(0)
2019–2021	Pisa	20	(0)
2021–2022	Brescia	1	(0)
2022–	Hellas Verona	7	(0)

International career
2011	Italy U16	3	(0)
- * Club domestic league appearances and goals as of 31 January 2026

Simone Perilli (born 7 January 1995) is an Italian professional footballer who plays as a goalkeeper for Serie B club Hellas Verona.

== Club career ==
Born in Rome, Perilli started his career at Lazio, before joining city rivals Roma. He then moved to Sassuolo in January 2012, as he proceeded to feature for their youth teams from 2012 to 2014.

On 2 August 2014, Perilli was signed by Lega Pro club Pro Patria on a season-long loan.

On 5 July 2015 Perilli received a call-up from Sassuolo. However, on 14 July he joined the pre-season camp of Reggiana instead. The transfer paperwork was completed on 28 July. He signed a three-year contract.

On 3 July 2018, Perugia announced that they had signed Perilli on loan from Pordenone, with an option to buy.

On 13 August 2019, he signed with Pisa.

On 1 July 2021, Perilli joined Brescia. On 29 July 2022, hiss contract with Brescia was terminated by mutual consent.

On 3 August 2022, Perilli joined Serie A side Hellas Verona on a free transfer, signing a two-year deal. On 5 March 2023, he made his top-tier debut in a league match against Spezia, following an influenza infection occurring to first-choice keeper Lorenzo Montipò: in the process, he helped his side keep a clean sheet in a goalless draw.

== Career statistics ==
As of match played 31 January 2026

Appearances and goals by club, season and competition
Club	Season	League			National cup		Other		Total	
Club	Season	Division	Apps	Goals	Apps	Goals	Apps	Goals	Apps	Goals
Sassuolo	2012–13	Serie B	0	0	0	0	—		0	0
Sassuolo	2013–14	Serie A	0	0	0	0	—		0	0
Sassuolo	Total		0	0	0	0	—		0	0
Pro Patria (loan)	2014–15	Lega Pro	10	0	1 (Note: Appearance in Coppa Italia Lega Pro)	0	2 (Note: Appearances in Lega Pro-Relegation play-offs)	0	12	0
Reggiana	2015–16	Lega Pro	34	0	2	0	—		36	0
Reggiana	2016–17	Lega Pro	30	0	2	0	2 (Note: Appearances in Lega Pro-Promotion play-offs)	0	34	0
Reggiana	Total		64	0	4	0	2	0	70	0
Pordenone	2017–18	Serie C	29	0	5	0	1 (Note: Appearances in Serie C-Promotion play-offs)	0	35	0
Perugia (loan)	2018–19	Serie B	0	0	0	0	0	0	0	0
Pisa	2019–20	Serie B	2	0	0	0	—		2	0
Pisa	2020–21	Serie B	18	0	1	0	—		19	0
Pisa	Total		20	0	1	0	—		21	0
Brescia	2021–22	Serie B	1	0	1	0	0	0	2	0
Hellas Verona	2022–23	Serie A	1	0	0	0	0	0	1	0
Hellas Verona	2023–24	Serie A	1	0	1	0	—		2	0
Hellas Verona	2024–25	Serie A	2	0	0	0	—		1	0
Hellas Verona	2025–26	Serie A	3	0	1	0	—		4	0
Hellas Verona	Total		7	0	2	0	—		9	0
Career total			131	0	14	0	5	0	150	0
