= Asanda Sishuba =

South African soccer player

Personal information
- Date of birth: 13 April 1980 (age 46)
- Place of birth: Langa, Cape Town, South Africa
- Height: 1.70 m (5 ft 7 in)
- Position: Midfielder

Senior career*
| Years | Team | Apps | (Gls) |
| 2002 | Fortune | | |
| 2002–2003 | Mouscron | 17 | (1) |
| 2003–2005 | Royal Antwerp | 41 | (2) |
| 2005 | Heusden-Zolder | 17 | (6) |
| 2006–2007 | Sint-Truiden | 52 | (8) |
| 2008–2010 | Mouscron | 46 | (1) |
- * Club domestic league appearances and goals

Asanda Sishuba (born 13 April 1980) is a South African former professional footballer who played as a midfielder for various clubs in Belgium.

== International career ==
Sishuba was selected for the South Africa national team squads on a number of occasions, but did not play for his country.

== Personal life ==
Sishuba is the father of the footballer Ayanda Sishuba.
