= Alessandro Berardi =

Italian footballer (born 1991)

Personal information
- Date of birth: 16 January 1991 (age 35)
- Place of birth: Rome, Italy
- Height: 1.85 m (6 ft 1 in)
- Position: Goalkeeper

Youth career
- –2009: Lazio

Senior career*
Years	Team	Apps	(Gls)
2009–2015	Lazio	0	(0)
2012–2013	→ Hellas Verona (loan)	1	(0)
2013–2014	→ Salernitana (loan)	6	(0)
2014–2015	→ Grosseto (loan)	3	(0)
2015	→ Messina (loan)	12	(0)
2015–2017	Messina	60	(0)
2017–2018	Bari	0	(0)
2019–2025	Hellas Verona	2	(0)
- * Club domestic league appearances and goals as of 25 May 2025

Alessandro Berardi (born 16 January 1991) is an ex Italian professional footballer who played as a goalkeeper.

== Club career ==
Born in Rome, Berardi joined Hellas Verona on loan from Lazio on 30 August 2012. On 17 July 2013, he joined Salernitana on a season-long loan deal. He was loaned out again in the next year, this time to Grosseto. On 10 January 2015, it was announced that he has left the club and joined Messina on loan to get more first team opportunities.

Berardi signed permanently with Messina in September 2015. On 22 September 2017, he signed a one-year deal with Serie B club Bari.

On 14 December 2018, he returned to Hellas Verona as a free agent.

== Career statistics ==
As of match played 21 May 2022

Appearances and goals by club, season and competition
Club	Season	League			National cup		Other		Total	
Club	Season	Division	Apps	Goals	Apps	Goals	Apps	Goals	Apps	Goals
Lazio	2010–11	Serie A	0	0	0	0	—		0	0
Lazio	2011–12	Serie A	0	0	0	0	0	0	0	0
Lazio	2012–13	Serie A	0	0	—		0	0	0	0
Lazio	Total		0	0	0	0	0	0	0	0
Hellas Verona (loan)	2012–13	Serie B	1	0	0	0	—		1	0
Salernitana (loan)	2013–14	Lega Pro Prima Divisione	6	0	6 (Note: Appearances in Coppa Italia Lega Pro)	0	0	0	12	0
Grosseto (loan)	2014–15	Lega Pro	3	0	—		—		3	0
Messina (loan)	2014–15	Lega Pro	12	0	—		2 (Note: Appearances in Lega Pro-Relegation play-out)	0	14	0
Messina	2015–16	Lega Pro	25	0	—		—		25	0
Messina	2016–17	Lega Pro	35	0	1	0	—		36	0
Messina	Total		72	0	1	0	2	0	75	0
Bari	2017–18	Serie B	0	0	0	0	0	0	0	0
Hellas Verona	2018–19	Serie B	0	0	0	0	0	0	0	0
Hellas Verona	2019–20	Serie A	0	0	0	0	—		0	0
Hellas Verona	2020–21	Serie A	1	0	0	0	—		1	0
Hellas Verona	2021–22	Serie A	1	0	0	0	—		1	0
Hellas Verona	2022–23	Serie A	0	0	0	0	0	0	0	0
Hellas Verona	2023–24	Serie A	0	0	0	0	—		0	0
Hellas Verona	2024–25	Serie A	0	0	0	0	—		0	0
Hellas Verona	Total		2	0	0	0	0	0	2	0
Career total			84	0	7	0	2	0	93	0

== Honours ==
Salernitana

- Coppa Italia Lega Pro: 2013–14
