= Jackson Tchatchoua =

Belgian footballer

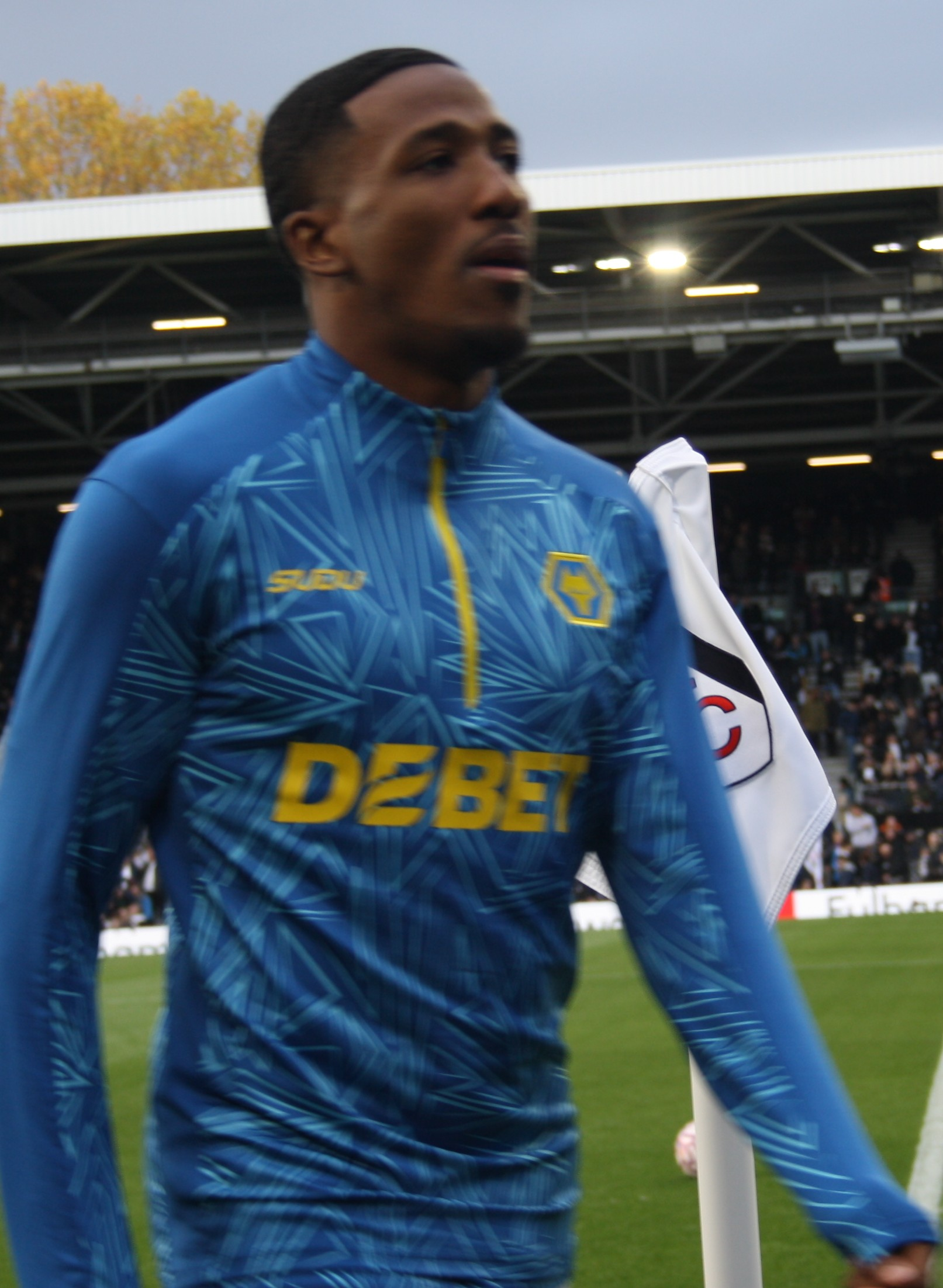
- Tchatchoua with Wolverhampton Wanderers in 2025

Personal information
- Full name: Jackson Tchatchoua
- Date of birth: 14 September 2001 (age 25)
- Place of birth: Ixelles, Belgium
- Height: 1.86 m (6 ft 1 in)
- Position: Full-back

Team information
- Current team: Wolverhampton Wanderers
- Number: 38

Youth career
- –2015: Standard Liège
- 2015–2016: OH Leuven
- 2016–2021: Charleroi

Senior career*
| Years | Team | Apps | (Gls) |
| 2021–2024 | Charleroi | 60 | (2) |
| 2023–2024 | → Hellas Verona (loan) | 26 | (0) |
| 2024–2025 | Hellas Verona | 36 | (2) |
| 2025– | Wolverhampton Wanderers | 37 | (0) |

International career^{‡}
| 2024– | Cameroon | 16 | (0) |
- * Club domestic league appearances and goals as of 13 September 2026 ‡ National team caps and goals as of 29 September 2026

Jackson Tchatchoua (born 14 September 2001) is a professional footballer who plays as a full-back for EFL Championship club Wolverhampton Wanderers. Born in Belgium, he represents the Cameroon national team.

== Club career ==
Tchatchoua made his Belgian First Division A debut for Charleroi on 24 July 2021 in a game against Oostende. Tchatchoua scored his first goal for Charleroi on 16 December 2021 against Genk.

On 31 August 2023, he moved on loan with option to buy to Serie A club Hellas Verona. After playing there for two years, he signed a five-year contract with Premier League side Wolves in August 2025.

== International career ==
Born in Belgium, Tchatchoua is of Cameroonian descent. He also holds French citizenship from his parents. In March 2023, he was selected to represent Cameroon under-23 for the first time.

Tchatchoua made his debut for the Cameroon national team on 8 June 2024 in a World Cup qualifier 4–1 victory against Cape Verde at the Ahmadou Ahidjo Stadium. He played the full game.

== Career statistics ==
=== Club ===
As of match played 13 September 2026

Appearances and goals by club, season and competition
| Club | Season | League | | | National cup (Note: Includes Belgian Cup, Coppa Italia, FA Cup) | | League cup (Note: Includes EFL Cup) | | Other | | Total | |
| Club | Season | Division | Apps | Goals | Apps | Goals | Apps | Goals | Apps | Goals | Apps | Goals |
|---|---|---|---|---|---|---|---|---|---|---|---|---|
| Charleroi | 2021–22 | Belgian Pro League | 31 | 1 | 1 | 0 | — | | 2 (Note: Appearance in Belgian Pro League European competition play-offs) | 0 | 34 | 1 |
| Charleroi | 2022–23 | Belgian Pro League | 29 | 1 | 1 | 0 | — | | — | | 30 | 1 |
| Charleroi | Total | | 60 | 2 | 2 | 0 | — | | 2 | 0 | 64 | 2 |
| Hellas Verona (loan) | 2023–24 | Serie A | 26 | 0 | 1 | 0 | — | | — | | 27 | 0 |
| Hellas Verona | 2024–25 | Serie A | 36 | 2 | 1 | 0 | — | | — | | 37 | 2 |
| Hellas Verona | Verona total | | 62 | 2 | 2 | 0 | — | | — | | 64 | 2 |
| Wolverhampton Wanderers | 2025–26 | Premier League | 31 | 0 | 3 | 0 | 2 | 0 | — | | 36 | 0 |
| Wolverhampton Wanderers | 2026–27 | Championship | 6 | 0 | 0 | 0 | 2 | 0 | — | | 8 | 0 |
| Wolverhampton Wanderers | Total | | 37 | 0 | 3 | 0 | 4 | 0 | — | | 44 | 0 |
| Career total | | | 159 | 4 | 6 | 0 | 4 | 0 | 2 | 0 | 172 | 4 |

=== International ===
As of match played 29 September 2026

Appearances and goals by national team and year
| National team | Year | Apps | Goals |
|---|---|---|---|
| Cameroon | 2024 | 8 | 0 |
| Cameroon | 2025 | 6 | 0 |
| Cameroon | 2026 | 2 | 0 |
| Total | | 16 | 0 |
