= Lorenzo Montipò =

Italian footballer

Personal information
- Date of birth: 20 February 1996 (age 30)
- Place of birth: Novara, Italy
- Height: 1.91 m (6 ft 3 in)
- Position: Goalkeeper

Team information
- Current team: Venezia
- Number: 96

Youth career
- 2010–2014: Novara

Senior career*
Years	Team	Apps	(Gls)
2013–2019	Novara	46	(0)
2015–2016	→ Siena (loan)	32	(0)
2016–2017	→ Carpi (loan)	0	(0)
2018–2019	→ Benevento (loan)	26	(0)
2019–2022	Benevento	72	(0)
2021–2022	→ Hellas Verona (loan)	34	(0)
2022–2026	Hellas Verona	145	(0)
2026–	Venezia	0	(0)

International career
2014	Italy U18	2	(0)
2014–2015	Italy U19	5	(0)
2015–2016	Italy U20	1	(0)
2017–2019	Italy U21	2	(0)
- * Club domestic league appearances and goals as of 23 August 2026

Lorenzo Montipò (born 20 February 1996) is an Italian professional footballer who plays as a goalkeeper for Serie A club Venezia.

== Club career ==
Born in Novara, Piedmont, Montipò started his professional career at hometown club Novara.

On 14 July 2015, he was signed by Siena on loan.

On 31 August 2016, Montipò was signed by Carpi in a temporary deal, with an option to purchase him outright. However, the loan was cancelled in January 2017.

On 12 July 2018, Montipò signed with Benevento on loan until 30 June 2019. On 18 June 2019, it was confirmed that Montipò had signed a four-year contract with the club.

Following Benevento's relegation from Serie A at the end of the 2020–21 season, Montipò joined Hellas Verona on loan for the 2021–22 season with a conditional obligation to buy.

On August 18 2026, Montipò joined Serie A club Venezia from Hellas Verona.

== International career ==
On 4 September 2017, he made his debut with the Italy U21 team in a friendly match against Slovenia.

== Career statistics ==
As of match played 24 May 2026

Appearances and goals by club, season and competition
Club	Season	League			National cup		Other		Total	
Club	Season	Division	Apps	Goals	Apps	Goals	Apps	Goals	Apps	Goals
Novara	2012–13	Serie B	1	0	0	0	0	0	1	0
Novara	2013–14	Serie B	2	0	0	0	1 (Note: Appearance in Serie B relegation play-out)	0	3	0
Novara	2014–15	Lega Pro	0	0	0	0	2 (Note: Appearances in Supercoppa di Lega Pro)	0	2	0
Novara	2016–17	Serie B	4	0	0	0	—		4	0
Novara	2017–18	Serie B	39	0	1	0	—		40	0
Novara	Total		46	0	1	0	3	0	50	0
Siena (loan)	2015–16	Lega Pro	32	0	3 (Note: Appearances in Coppa Italia Lega Pro)	0	—		35	0
Benevento (loan)	2018–19	Serie B	26	0	2	0	2 (Note: Appearances in Serie B promotion play-offs)	0	30	0
Benevento	2019–20	Serie B	35	0	1	0	—		36	0
Benevento	2020–21	Serie A	37	0	0	0	—		37	0
Benevento	Total		72	0	1	0	0	0	73	0
Hellas Verona (loan)	2021–22	Serie A	34	0	0	0	—		34	0
Hellas Verona	2022–23	Serie A	37	0	1	0	1 (Note: Appearance in Serie A relegation tie-breaker)	0	39	0
Hellas Verona	2023–24	Serie A	37	0	1	0	—		38	0
Hellas Verona	2024–25	Serie A	36	0	1	0	—		37	0
Hellas Verona	2025–26	Serie A	35	0	1	0	—		36	0
Hellas Verona	Total		145	0	4	0	1	0	150	0
Venezia	2026–27	Serie A	0	0	0	0	—		0	0
Career total			355	0	11	0	6	0	372	0

== Honours ==
Novara

- Lega Pro: 2014–15
- Supercoppa di Lega Pro: 2015

Benevento

- Serie B: 2019–20
