= Ayanda Sishuba =

South African Belgian born footballer (born 2005)

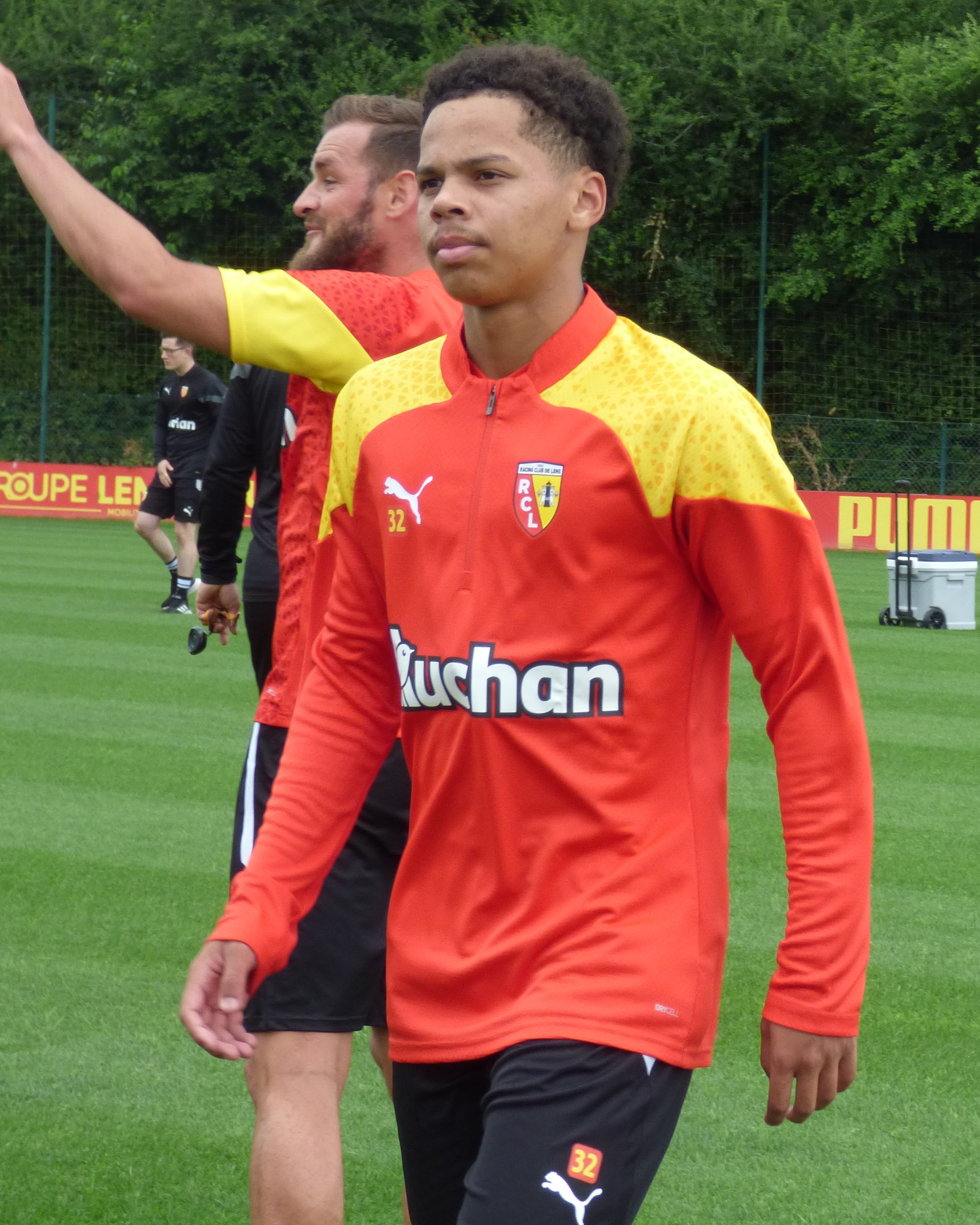
- Sishuba training with Lens in 2023

Personal information
- Date of birth: 2 February 2005 (age 21)
- Place of birth: Tournai, Belgium
- Height: 1.69 m (5 ft 7 in)
- Position: Midfielder

Team information
- Current team: Rennes

Youth career
- 2009–2014: Mouscron
- 2014–2017: Lille
- 2017–2018: Mouscron
- 2018–2022: Lens

Senior career*
Years	Team	Apps	(Gls)
2022–2024	Lens B	36	(12)
2023–2024	Lens	7	(0)
2024–2025	Hellas Verona	0	(0)
2025–	Rennes	1	(0)
2025–2026	→ Montpellier (loan)	11	(0)

International career^{‡}
2022	Belgium U17	2	(0)
2023	Belgium U18	3	(2)
2023–	Belgium U19	10	(3)
- * Club domestic league appearances and goals as of 11 May 2026 ‡ National team caps and goals as of 26 March 2024

Ayanda Sishuba (born 2 February 2005) is a Belgian professional footballer who plays as a midfielder for French Ligue 1 club Rennes.

== Club career ==
=== Lens ===
Born in Tournai, Belgium, Sishuba first played for Excelsior Mouscron—where his father Asanda Sishuba then was a professional footballer—from the age of four, before moving to France, joining the Lille academy. But after three seasons he signed for their Nord-Pas-de-Calaisiens rivals of RC Lens at the age of 13.

He signed his first professional contract with the club in December 2021, as he had already become a standout with the under-19, aged only 16.

Ayanda Sishuba began to train regularly with Lens' first team during the 2022–23 season, while having established himself as a leader of the National 3 reserve team.

He was among the young players selected to join the first team during the 2023–24 pre-season, already proving decisive during the friendly against Dunkirk, coming on as a substitute, obtaining two penalties, scoring a goal and delivering an assist.

=== Hellas Verona ===
On 31 August 2024, Sishuba signed with Hellas Verona in Italy. However, he featured in only two matches in the U20 Primavera competitions.

=== Rennes ===
On 3 February 2025, Sishuba went back to Ligue 1 and signed with Rennes.

== International career ==
Sishuba is eligible to play for either Belgium, France, or South Africa.

Sishuba is a youth international for Belgium, having played three games with the under-18 for two goals by the summer 2023.

== Personal life ==
Sishuba is the son of the South African footballer Asanda Sishuba.

== Career statistics ==
=== Club ===
As of match played 19 May 2024

Appearances by club, season and competition
Club	Season	League			Cup		Europe		Total	
Club	Season	Division	Apps	Goals	Apps	Goals	Apps	Goals	Apps	Goals
Lens B	2021–22	Championnat National 2	7	0	—		—		7	0
Lens B	2022–23	Championnat National 3	18	9	—		—		18	9
Lens B	2023–24	Championnat National 3	11	3	—		—		11	3
Lens B	Total		36	12	—		—		36	12
Lens	2023–24	Ligue 1	7	0	1	0	0	0	8	0
Hellas Verona	2024–25	Serie A	0	0	—		—		0	0
Career total			43	12	1	0	0	0	44	12
