= Juan Cabal =

Colombian footballer (born 2001)

Personal information
- Full name: Juan David Cabal Murillo
- Date of birth: 8 January 2001 (age 25)
- Place of birth: Cali, Colombia
- Height: 1.86 m (6 ft 1 in)
- Position: Left-back

Team information
- Current team: Juventus
- Number: 32

Youth career
- 2014–2019: Atlético Nacional

Senior career*
Years	Team	Apps	(Gls)
2019–2022	Atlético Nacional	45	(1)
2022–2024	Hellas Verona	33	(0)
2024–	Juventus	19	(2)

International career^{‡}
2019	Colombia U18	1	(0)
2024–	Colombia	3	(0)
- * Club domestic league appearances and goals as of 23:18, 14 February 2026 (UTC) ‡ National team caps and goals as of 29 March 2026

Juan David Cabal Murillo (born 8 January 2001) is a Colombian professional footballer who plays as a left-back for Serie A club Juventus and the Colombia national team.

== Club career ==
Cabal started his career with Colombian club Atlético Nacional, helping them win the 2021 Copa Colombia. He played 50 games in all competitions for the team.

On 20 August 2022, Cabal signed for Serie A club Hellas Verona. In his first season, he played only twelve games and was used as a back-up centre-back. Cabal played 30 minutes in the relegation play-off game against Spezia, which Verona won. Cabal emerged during the second half of the 2023–24 season, where he was deployed as a left-back in Marco Baroni's four-man defence.

On 18 July 2024, Cabal joined fellow Serie A club Juventus on a five-year contract. In November that year, he sustained an ACL injury in his left knee which sidelined him for the rest of the 2024–25 season.

== International career ==
On 10 September 2024, Cabal debuted for the Colombia national team a 2026 World Cup qualification against Argentina at the Estadio Metropolitano Roberto Meléndez, replacing Yerson Mosquera in the 88th minute; the match ended in a 2–1 victory for the Colombians.

== Style of play ==
Initially a centre-back, Cabal later developed into a left-back with a strong physique.

== Career statistics ==
=== Club ===
As of match played 17 February 2026

Appearances and goals by club, season and competition
Club	Season	League			National cup		Continental		Other		Total	
Club	Season	Division	Apps	Goals	Apps	Goals	Apps	Goals	Apps	Goals	Apps	Goals
Atlético Nacional	2019	Categoría Primera A	8	0	1	0	—		—		9	0
Atlético Nacional	2020	Categoría Primera A	7	0	1	0	—		—		8	0
Atlético Nacional	2021	Categoría Primera A	7	0	1	0	0	0	—		8	0
Atlético Nacional	2022	Categoría Primera A	23	1	2	0	—		—		25	0
Atlético Nacional	Total		45	1	5	0	0	0	—		50	1
Hellas Verona	2022–23	Serie A	11	0	0	0	—		1 (Note: Appearance in Serie A relegation tie-breaker)	0	12	0
Hellas Verona	2023–24	Serie A	22	0	0	0	—		—		22	0
Hellas Verona	Total		33	0	0	0	—		1	0	34	0
Juventus	2024–25	Serie A	7	0	0	0	2 (Note: Appearances in UEFA Champions League)	0	0	0	9	0
Juventus	2025–26	Serie A	12	2	1	0	6	0	—		19	2
Juventus	Total		19	2	1	0	8	0	0	0	28	2
Career total			97	3	6	0	8	0	1	0	112	3

=== International ===
As of match played 29 March 2026

Appearances and goals by national team and year
National team	Year	Apps	Goals
Colombia	2024	2	0
Colombia	2025	0	0
Colombia	2026	1	0
Total		3	0

== Honours ==
Atlético Nacional

- Copa Colombia: 2021
