= Dani Silva =

Portuguese footballer (born 2000)

Personal information
- Full name: Daniel Filipe Bandeira e Silva
- Date of birth: 11 April 2000 (age 26)
- Place of birth: Beja, Portugal
- Height: 1.80 m (5 ft 11 in)
- Position: Midfielder

Team information
- Current team: Widzew Łódź (on loan from Midtjylland)
- Number: 80

Youth career
- 2008–2009: Monte Caparica AC
- 2009–2012: Benfica
- 2012–2013: Belenenses
- 2013–2018: Vitória Setúbal
- 2018–2019: Vitória Guimarães

Senior career*
Years	Team	Apps	(Gls)
2019–2022	Vitória Guimarães B	44	(4)
2022–2024	Vitória Guimarães	47	(2)
2024–2025	Hellas Verona	25	(0)
2025–	Midtjylland	23	(1)
2026	→ Pafos (loan)	15	(0)
2026–	→ Widzew Łódź (loan)	0	(0)

International career^{‡}
2018	Portugal U18	8	(1)
2018–2019	Portugal U19	12	(2)
2019	Portugal U20	4	(0)
2023	Portugal U21	2	(0)
Medal record
Men's football
Representing Portugal
UEFA European Under-19 Championship
Runner-up	2019 Armenia
- * Club domestic league appearances and goals as of 14:01, 4 June 2026 (UTC) ‡ National team caps and goals as of 28 March 2023

Daniel Filipe Bandeira e Silva (born 11 April 2000), commonly known as Dani Silva, is a Portuguese professional footballer who plays as a midfielder for Ekstraklasa club Widzew Łódź, on loan from Midtjylland.

== Club career ==
Silva is a youth product of the academies of Monte Caparica AC, Benfica, Belenenses, Vitória Setúbal and Vitória Guimarães. He began his senior career with Vitória Guimarães B where he became captain, before promoting to the senior team in 2022 and signing a professional contract on 13 April 2022. He made his professional debut with Vitória Guimarães in a 1–1 Primeira Liga tie with Boavista on 6 May 2022, coming on as a substitute in the 69th minute.

On 25 January 2024, Silva joined Serie A club Hellas Verona. He reportedly signed a four-year contract for a €2 million transfer fee.

In the late hours of deadline day, 3 February 2025, he joined Danish side FC Midtjylland for a reported fee of €3 million. In 2026, he was sent on loan to Cypriot side Pafos and Polish club Widzew Łódź.

== International career ==
Silva is a youth international for Portugal, and represented the Portugal U19s at the 2019 UEFA European Under-19 Championship.

== Career statistics ==
As of match played 29 May 2026

Appearances and goals by club, season and competition
Club	Season	Division	League		National cup (Note: Includes Taça de Portugal, Coppa Italia, Danish Cup, Cypriot Cup)		League cup (Note: Includes Taça da Liga)		Europe		Total	
Club	Season	Division	Apps	Goals	Apps	Goals	Apps	Goals	Apps	Goals	Apps	Goals
Vitória B	2019–20	Campeonato de Portugal	3	0	—		—		—		3	0
Vitória B	2020–21	Campeonato de Portugal	19	1	—		—		—		19	1
Vitória B	2021–22	Liga 3	22	3	—		—		—		22	3
Vitória B	Total		44	4	—		—		—		44	4
Vitória	2021–22	Primeira Liga	1	0	0	0	0	0	—		1	0
Vitória	2022–23	Primeira Liga	30	1	3	0	3	0	3 (Note: Appearances in UEFA Conference League)	0	39	1
Vitória	2023–24	Primeira Liga	16	1	3	0	1	0	2	0	22	1
Vitória	Total		47	2	6	0	4	0	5	0	62	2
Hellas Verona	2023–24	Serie A	14	0	—		—		—		14	0
Hellas Verona	2024–25	Serie A	11	0	1	0	—		—		12	0
Hellas Verona	Total		25	0	1	0	—		—		26	0
Midtjylland	2024–25	Danish Superliga	13	1	—		—		2 (Note: Appearances in UEFA Europa League)	0	15	1
Midtjylland	2025–26	Danish Superliga	10	0	2	0	—		4	0	16	0
Midtjylland	Total		23	1	2	0	—		6	0	31	1
Pafos (loan)	2025–26	Cypriot First Division	15	0	3	0	—		—		18	0
Widzew Łódź (loan)	2026–27	Ekstraklasa	0	0	0	0	—		—		0	0
Career total			154	7	12	0	6	0	9	0	181	7

== Honours ==
Pafos

- Cypriot Cup: 2025–26

Portugal U19

- UEFA European Under-19 Championship runner-up: 2019
