= Daniel Mosquera =

Colombian footballer (born 2001)

Personal information
- Full name: Daniel Fernando Mosquera Bonilla
- Date of birth: 20 October 1999 (age 27)
- Place of birth: Quibdó, Colombia
- Height: 1.81 m (5 ft 11 in)
- Position: Forward

Team information
- Current team: Hellas Verona
- Number: 25

Youth career
- –2018: Energiya Chaykovsky

Senior career*
Years	Team	Apps	(Gls)
2018–2020	Barranquilla	18	(2)
2020–2021	Llaneros EF		(3)
2021–2022	Universidad Central	22	(9)
2022–2024	América de Cali	42	(4)
2024	→ Atlético Bucaramanga (loan)	26	(7)
2024–	Hellas Verona	60	(11)

International career^{‡}
2026–	Colombia	2	(0)
- * Club domestic league appearances and goals as of 07:05, 17 October 2026 (UTC) ‡ National team caps and goals as of 17 November 2026

Daniel Fernando Mosquera Bonilla (born 20 October 1999) is a Colombian professional footballer who plays as a forward for Serie B club Hellas Verona and the Colombia national team.

== Club career ==
=== Hellas Verona ===
On 3 July 2024, Mosquera signed for Serie A club Hellas Verona.

On 18 August 2024, Mosquera scored twice for Hellas Verona after coming on from the bench against Napoli on the opening day of the day league season.

== International career ==
Mosquera made his debut for the Colombia national team on 13 November 2026 in a friendly against Chile.

== Honours ==
Atlético Bucaramanga

- Categoría Primera A: 2024 Apertura
