= Reda Belahyane =

Morocco international footballer (born 2004)

Personal information
- Date of birth: 1 June 2004 (age 22)
- Place of birth: Aubervilliers, France
- Height: 1.69 m (5 ft 7 in)
- Position: Defensive midfielder

Team information
- Current team: Lazio
- Number: 21

Youth career
- 2010–2013: Olympique Pantin
- 2013–2014: FCM Aubervilliers
- 2014–2016: Red Star
- 2016–2019: FC Montfermeil
- 2019–2021: Nice

Senior career*
Years	Team	Apps	(Gls)
2021–2023	Nice B	36	(3)
2023–2024	Nice	5	(0)
2024–2025	Hellas Verona	24	(0)
2025–	Lazio	19	(0)

International career^{‡}
2022	France U18	5	(0)
2024–	Morocco	1	(0)
- * Club domestic league appearances and goals as of 23:42, 23 May 2026 (UTC) ‡ National team caps and goals as of 15 October 2024

Reda Belahyane (Arabic: رضا بلحيان; born 1 June 2004) is a professional footballer who plays as a defensive midfielder for Serie A club Lazio. Born in France, he plays for the Morocco national team.

== Club career ==
Belahyane is a youth product of Olympique Pantin, Aubervilliers, Red Star and Montfermeil FC before joining Nice's youth side in 2019. On 20 October 2021, he signed his first professional contract with Nice. He made his professional debut with Nice as a late substitute in a 1–1 Ligue 1 tie with Auxerre on 3 March 2023. He made his full debut against Brest, playing 90 minutes in a 1–0 win.

On 25 January 2024, Nice announced Belahyane's transfer to Hellas Verona in Italy.

On 3 February 2025, Belahyane moved to Lazio. He made his debut off the bench 40 minutes through a 0–0 draw with Venezia.

== International career ==
Born in France, Belahyane is of Moroccan descent. He was part of the France U18s that won the 2022 Mediterranean Games football tournament.

On 2 October 2024, Belahyane received his first call-up to the Morocco national team. He made his debut for Morocco on 15 October 2024 in a 2025 Africa Cup of Nations qualification game against Central African Republic.

== Career statistics ==
=== Club ===
As of match played 16 August 2026

Appearances and goals by club, season and competition
Club	Season	League			National cup		Europe		Total	
Club	Season	Division	Apps	Goals	Apps	Goals	Apps	Goals	Apps	Goals
Nice B	2021–22	Championnat National 3	24	1	—		—		24	1
Nice B	2022–23	Championnat National 3	12	2	—		—		12	2
Nice B	Total		36	3	—		—		36	3
Nice	2022–23	Ligue 1	4	0	0	0	2 (Note: Appearances in UEFA Europa Conference League)	0	6	0
Nice	2023–24	Ligue 1	1	0	1	0	—		2	0
Nice	Total		5	0	1	0	2	0	8	0
Hellas Verona	2023–24	Serie A	2	0	—		—		2	0
Hellas Verona	2024–25	Serie A	22	0	0	0	—		22	0
Hellas Verona	Total		24	0	0	0	—		24	0
Lazio	2024–25	Serie A	6	0	0	0	0	0	6	0
Lazio	2025–26	Serie A	13	0	1	0	—		14	0
Lazio	2026–27	Serie A	10	0	1	0	—		11	0
Lazio	Total		29	0	2	0	0	0	21	0
Career total			4	3	3	0	2	0	89	3

=== International ===
As of match played 15 October 2024

Appearances and goals by national team and year
National team	Year	Apps	Goals
Morocco	2024	1	0
Total		1	0

== Honours ==
France U18

- Mediterranean Games: 2022
