= Daniele Ghilardi =

Italian footballer (born 2003)

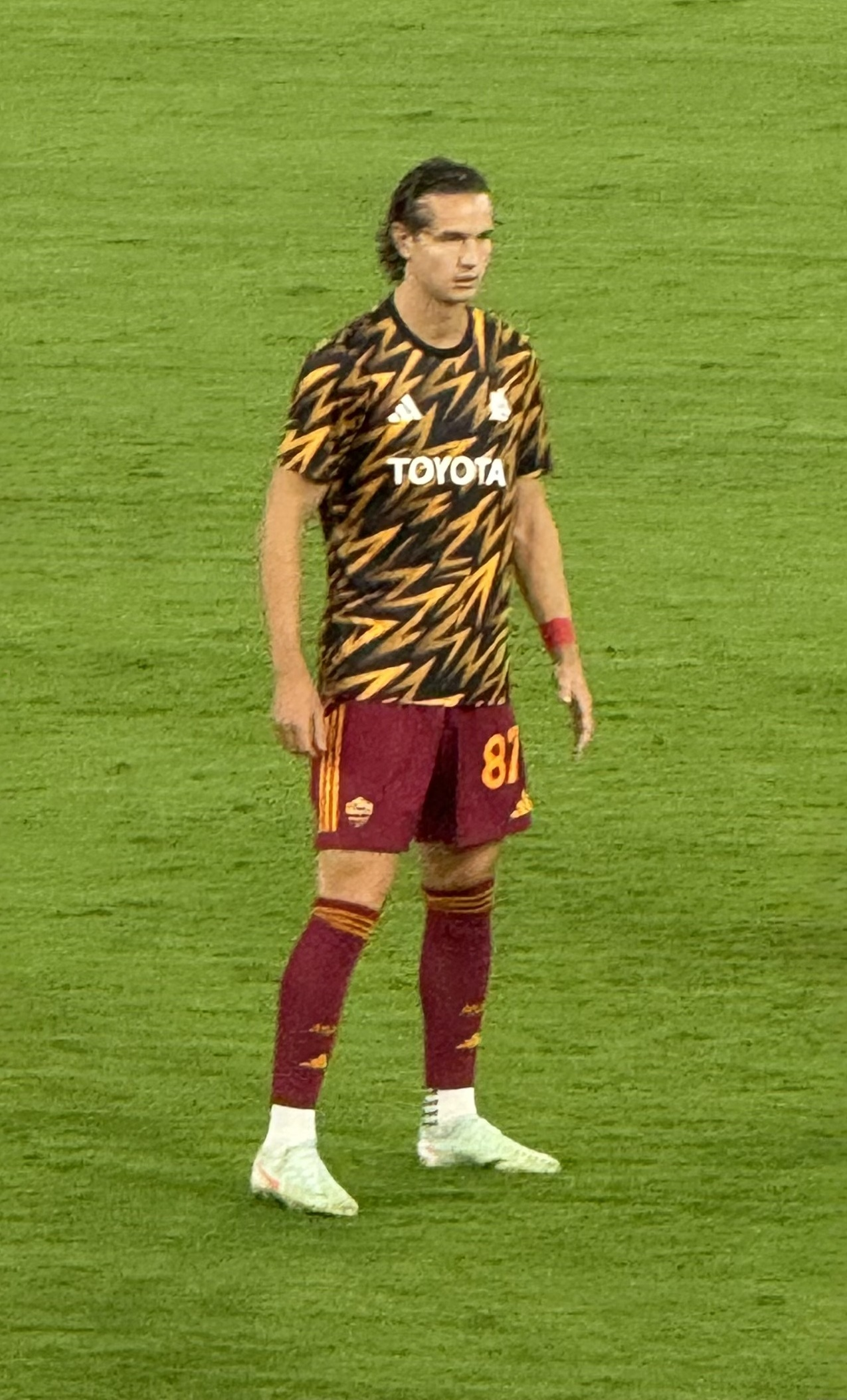
- Ghilardi with Roma in 2025

Personal information
- Date of birth: 6 January 2003 (age 23)
- Place of birth: Lucca, Italy
- Height: 1.89 m (6 ft 2 in)
- Position: Centre-back

Team information
- Current team: Roma
- Number: 87

Youth career
- 2008–2012: Lucchese
- 2012–2022: Fiorentina
- 2022: → Hellas Verona (loan)

Senior career*
Years	Team	Apps	(Gls)
2022–2026	Hellas Verona	24	(0)
2022–2023	→ Mantova (loan)	21	(1)
2023–2024	→ Sampdoria (loan)	38	(2)
2025–2026	→ Roma (loan)	23	(0)
2026–	Roma	7	(1)

International career^{‡}
2019–2020	Italy U17	4	(0)
2021	Italy U18	1	(0)
2021–2022	Italy U19	12	(0)
2022–2023	Italy U20	10	(0)
2023–2025	Italy U21	16	(1)
Medal record
Men's football
Representing Italy
FIFA U-20 World Cup
Runner-up	2023 Argentina
- * Club domestic league appearances and goals as of 22:37, 31 October 2026 (UTC) ‡ National team caps and goals as of 22 June 2025

Daniele Ghilardi (born 6 January 2003) is an Italian professional footballer who plays as a centre-back for Serie A club Roma.

== Club career ==
Ghilardi is a youth product of Lucchese from the age of 5 to 9 and played as a goalkeeper and striker as a youth. He moved to Fiorentina's youth academy at 9, worked his way up their youth categories, and signed his first professional contract with the club on 22 September 2021 until 2024.

He joined Hellas Verona on loan with the option to buy in January 2022. Hellas Verona exercised the option for €500,000 on 16 July 2022. He spent the 2022–23 season on loan with Mantova 1911 in the Serie C.

On 13 August 2023, he joined Sampdoria on loan in the Serie B for the 2023–24 season with the option to buy.

On 2 August 2025, Ghilardi joined Roma on loan for the 2025–26 season, for an estimated €2.5 million fee with a conditional obligation to make the move permanent at the end of the season. He signed a contract with Roma until 2030 that would be in effect if the conditions are triggered.

== International career ==
Ghilardi is a youth international for Italy, having played for the Italy U20s at the 2023 FIFA U-20 World Cup where they came in second.

He was called up to the Italy U21s for a set of 2025 UEFA European Under-21 Championship qualification matches in September 2023, and he made his debut with the U21 side on 8 September in the match against Latvia.

Ghilardi was one of the players who were called up with the Italy national team by head coach Roberto Mancini for the 2026–27 UEFA Nations League matches against Belgium, Turkey and France between 25 September and 5 October 2026.

== Career statistics ==
As of match played 31 October 2026

Appearances and goals by club, season and competition
Club	Season	League			National cup (Note: Includes Coppa Italia Serie C, Coppa Italia)		Europe		Other		Total	
Club	Season	Division	Apps	Goals	Apps	Goals	Apps	Goals	Apps	Goals	Apps	Goals
Mantova (loan)	2022–23	Serie C	21	1	2	0	—		2 (Note: Appearances in Serie C relegation play-offs)	0	25	1
Sampdoria (loan)	2023–24	Serie B	38	2	2	0	—		—		40	2
Hellas Verona	2024–25	Serie A	24	0	0	0	—		—		24	0
Roma (loan)	2025–26	Serie A	23	0	1	0	4 (Note: Appearances in UEFA Europa League)	0	—		28	0
Roma	2026–27	Serie A	7	1	1	0	0	0	—		8	1
Roma	Roma total		30	1	2	0	4	0	—		36	1
Career total			103	4	6	0	4	0	2	0	115	4

== Honours ==
Italy U20

- FIFA U-20 World Cup runner-up: 2023
