= Mattia Florio =

Italy footballer

Personal information
- Date of birth: 5 September 2003 (age 23)
- Place of birth: Verona, Italy
- Height: 1.82 m (6 ft 0 in)
- Position: Forward

Team information
- Current team: Team Altamura
- Number: 15

Youth career
- Hellas Verona

Senior career*
Years	Team	Apps	(Gls)
2021–2025	Hellas Verona	0	(0)
2023–2024	→ Pro Sesto (loan)	24	(3)
2024–2025	→ Caldiero Terme (loan)	28	(1)
2025–	Team Altamura	23	(1)
- * Club domestic league appearances and goals as of 1 May 2026

Mattia Florio (born 5 September 2003) is an Italian professional footballer who plays as a forward for Serie C Group C club Team Altamura.

== Club career ==
Having come through the youth ranks of Hellas Verona, Florio started training with the first team in 2021, under head coach Igor Tudor, and eventually made his professional debut on 15 December 2021, coming in as a substitute during the second half of the Coppa Italia tie against Empoli, which ended in a 3–4 defeat for his side.

In July 2023, Florio was loaned to Serie C club Pro Sesto.

On 18 July 2024, Florio moved on loan to Caldiero Terme.

== Style of play ==
Florio mainly acts as a shadow striker, but can also play in every other attacking position. A right-footed player, he has been regarded for his shooting skills, his acceleration and his passing.

== Career statistics ==
=== Club ===
As of match played 15 December 2021

Club	Season	League			Coppa Italia		Other		Total	
Club	Season	Division	Apps	Goals	Apps	Goals	Apps	Goals	Apps	Goals
Hellas Verona	2021-22	Serie A	0	0	1	0	0	0	1	0
Hellas Verona	2022–23	Serie A	0	0	0	0	0	0	0	0
Career total			0	0	1	0	0	0	1	0
