= Juan Manuel Cruz =

Argentine footballer (born 1999)

Personal information
- Date of birth: 19 July 1999 (age 27)
- Place of birth: Buenos Aires, Argentina
- Height: 1.85 m (6 ft 1 in)
- Position: Forward

Youth career
- –2020: Banfield

Senior career*
Years	Team	Apps	(Gls)
2020–2023	Banfield	64	(10)
2023–2026	Hellas Verona	4	(0)
2025	→ Cosenza (loan)	6	(0)
2025–2026	→ Trento (loan)	3	(0)
- * Club domestic league appearances and goals as of 29 August 2026

Juan Manuel Cruz (born 19 July 1999) is an Argentine footballer who plays as a forward.

== Early life ==
Cruz was born on 19 July 1999 in Buenos Aires, Argentina. The son of Argentina international Julio Cruz, he moved from Argentina to the Netherlands and Italy at a young age before returning to Argentina, where he attended St. George's College in Argentina before attending the Pontifical Catholic University of Argentina, where he studied accounting.

== Career ==
As a youth player, Cruz joined the youth academy of Argentine side Banfield, where he started his senior career and made sixty-four league appearances and scored ten goals while playing for the club.

In 2023, Cruz signed for Serie A side Hellas Verona. On 2 October 2023, he debuted for the club during a 0–0 away draw to Torino in the league. On 3 February 2025, Cruz moved on loan to Cosenza in Serie B. On 5 August 2025, Cruz was loaned to Serie C club Trento.

On 31 August 2026, Cruz and Hellas Verona terminated their contract by mutual consent.

== Style of play ==
Cruz plays as a forward and is right-footed. Italian news website Numero Diez wrote in 2023 that he is a "very physical centre forward... he also combines physicality with speed and good technique".
