= Joselito (footballer, born 2004) =

Spanish footballer (born 2002)

Personal information
- Full name: José Antonio Gómez Márquez
- Date of birth: 9 February 2004 (age 22)
- Place of birth: Huelva, Spain
- Height: 1.84 m (6 ft 0 in)
- Position: Midfielder

Team information
- Current team: Spezia

Youth career
- –2012: Recreativo
- 2012–2018: Sevilla
- 2018: Recreativo
- 2020–2023: Hellas Verona

Senior career*
Years	Team	Apps	(Gls)
2019–2020	Coria	23	(1)
2023–2025	Hellas Verona	0	(0)
2025–2026	Perugia	31	(1)
2026–	Spezia	0	(0)
- * Club domestic league appearances and goals as of 30 April 2026

José Antonio Gómez Márquez (born 9 February 2004), known as Joselito, is a Spanish professional footballer who plays as a midfielder for Serie C Group B club Spezia.

== Early life ==
Joselito started his career with Spanish side Coria, where he was described as "established himself as a starter at only 15 years of age".

== Career ==
Joselito signed for Serie A side Hellas Verona in 2020. He never made an appearance for the senior squad, remaining on the bench on each occasion he was included in the match-day squad.

On 29 January 2025, Joselito joined Perugia in Serie C on a two-and-a-half-year contract.

== Style of play ==
Joselito mainly operates as a midfielder and has been described as "capable of combining important technical skills with a decent physical size".

== Personal life ==
Joselito is a native of Huelva, Spain.
