= Philip Yeboah =

Ghanaian football player

Personal information
- Full name: Philip Yeboah Ankrah
- Date of birth: 27 September 2002 (age 24)
- Place of birth: Drobo, Ghana
- Height: 1.80 m (5 ft 11 in)
- Position: Forward

Team information
- Current team: Savoia
- Number: 45

Senior career*
| Years | Team | Apps | (Gls) |
| 2020–2024 | Verona | 1 | (0) |
| 2022–2023 | → Mantova (loan) | 30 | (3) |
| 2023–2024 | → Lucchese (loan) | 25 | (6) |
| 2024–2026 | Monopoli | 29 | (3) |
| 2026 | → Pontedera (loan) | 17 | (4) |
| 2026– | Savoia | 2 | (2) |
- * Club domestic league appearances and goals as of 29 August 2026

Philip Yeboah Ankrah (born 27 September 2002) is a Ghanaian professional footballer who plays as a forward for Serie C Group C club Savoia.

== Club career ==
Yeboah made his Serie A debut for Verona on 19 December 2020 in a game against Fiorentina. He substituted Mattia Zaccagni in the 78th minute of a 1–1 away draw.

On 21 January 2021, he signed a 2.5-year professional contract with Verona. On 16 July 2022, Yeboah was loaned to Mantova.

On 8 July 2024, Yeboah moved to Monopoli in Serie C on a two-year contract, with an option for a third year.
