= Yayah Kallon =

Sierra Leonean footballer

Personal information
- Date of birth: 30 June 2001 (age 25)
- Place of birth: Koidu, Sierra Leone
- Height: 1.75 m (5 ft 9 in)
- Position: Forward

Team information
- Current team: Olimpija Ljubljana
- Number: 79

Youth career
- 2019–2021: Genoa

Senior career*
Years	Team	Apps	(Gls)
2018–2019	Savona	17	(0)
2021–2023	Genoa	16	(0)
2022–2023	→ Hellas Verona (loan)	22	(1)
2023–2025	Hellas Verona	1	(0)
2024	→ Bari (loan)	14	(0)
2024–2025	→ Salernitana (loan)	11	(0)
2025	→ Casertana (loan)	12	(1)
2025–2026	Casertana	32	(3)
2026–	Olimpija Ljubljana	1	(0)
- * Club domestic league appearances and goals as of 29 August 2026

Yayah Kallon (born 30 June 2001) is a Sierra Leonean professional footballer who plays as a forward for Slovenian PrvaLiga club Olimpija Ljubljana.

== Club career ==
In 2018, Kallon signed for Serie D side Savona, after having trialed for Virtus Entella in the Serie C. On 22 May 2021, he debuted for Genoa in a 1–0 Serie A win over Cagliari. On 13 August 2021, Kallon scored his first goal for Genoa, in a 3–2 Coppa Italia win over Perugia.

On 26 August 2022, Kallon joined Hellas Verona on loan with an option to buy and a conditional obligation to buy.

On 10 January 2024, Kallon moved on loan to Bari. On 30 July 2024, Kallon was loaned by Salernitana. On 3 February 2025, Kallon joined Casertana on loan.

On 14 August 2025, Kallon returned to Casertana on a permanent basis.

== Career statistics ==
=== Club ===
As of match played 23 August 2024

Appearances and goals by club, season and competition
Club	Season	League			National cup (Note: Includes Coppa Italia)		Europe		Other		Total	
Club	Season	Division	Apps	Goals	Apps	Goals	Apps	Goals	Apps	Goals	Apps	Goals
Savona	2018–19	Serie D	17	0	0	0	—		1 (Note: Appearance(s) in Serie D play-off)	0	18	0
Genoa (loan)	2020–21	Serie A	1	0	0	0	—		—		1	0
Genoa (loan)	2021–22	Serie A	15	0	2	1	—		—		17	1
Genoa (loan)	Total		16	0	2	1	—		—		18	1
Hellas Verona (loan)	2022–23	Serie A	22	1	0	0	—		—		22	1
Hellas Verona	2023–24	Serie A	1	0	0	0	—		—		1	0
Bari (loan)	2023–24	Serie B	13	0	0	0	—		1 (Note: Appearance(s) in Serie B play-out)	0	14	0
Career total			69	1	2	1	—		2	0	73	2
