= 2026–27 Hellas Verona FC season =

Hellas Verona
2026–27 season
- Owner: Presidio Investors
- President: Italo Zanzi
- Head Coach: Marco Baroni
- Stadium: Stadio Marcantonio Bentegodi
- Serie B: 5th
- Coppa Italia: Round of 16
- Top goalscorer: League: Daniel Mosquera (7); All: Daniel Mosquera (7)
Home colours	Away colours

The 2026–27 season is Hellas Verona FC's 124th season in its history and the first in seven years, back in Serie B after being relegated at the end of the previous season.

In addition to the domestic league, the team compete in the Coppa Italia.

== Squad ==
Note: Flags indicate national team as defined under FIFA eligibility rules; some limited exceptions apply. Players may hold more than one non-FIFA nationality.

No.	Pos.	Nation	Player
1	GK	ITA	Nicola Leali
3	DF	DEN	Martin Frese
4	DF	ITA	Gabriele Zappa (on loan from Cagliari)
5	DF	FRO	Andrias Edmundsson (captain)
6	DF	CRO	Domagoj Bradarić
8	MF	GER	Suat Serdar
9	FW	SWE	Amin Sarr
10	MF	SVK	Tomáš Suslov
11	MF	ITA	Mattia Compagnon (on loan from Venezia)
14	FW	CPV	Dailon Livramento
17	MF	FRA	Andréa Le Borgne (on loan from Como)
18	MF	SUI	Leorat Bega
19	FW	ITA	Samuele Mulattieri (on loan from Sassuolo)
20	MF	CYP	Grigoris Kastanos
21	MF	MAR	Abdou Harroui
22	GK	ITA	Giacomo Toniolo

No.	Pos.	Nation	Player
23	MF	ITA	Nunzio Lella
24	MF	FRA	Antoine Bernède
25	FW	COL	Daniel Mosquera
27	DF	POL	Paweł Dawidowicz
28	DF	DEN	Tobias Slotsager
33	DF	FRA	Noé Maël Tagne
34	GK	ITA	Simone Perilli
35	FW	ITA	Salvatore Cerbone
37	DF	ITA	Nicolò Calabrese
38	FW	FRA	Ruben Akalé
44	MF	ITA	Edoardo Iannoni
48	DF	LUX	Seid Korać (on loan from Venezia)
70	DF	GAM	Fallou Cham
71	DF	ITA	Davide De Battisti
79	FW	POL	Kacper Sezonienko
81	FW	GHA	Caleb Ekuban

== Transfers ==
=== Summer window ===
==== In ====
Date	Pos.	Player	From	Fee	Notes	Ref.
25 June 2026	MF	(Switzerland) Leorat Bega	(Switzerland) FC Stade Nyonnais	Free		
11 July 2026	GK	(Italy) Nicola Leali	(Italy) Genoa	Free		
11 July 2026	FW	(Italy) Salvatore Cerbone	(Italy) Casarano	Undisclosed		
27 July 2026	DF	(Germany) Allan Bohomo	(Germany) Bayern Munich	Free	Joined Primavera squad	
31 July 2026	FW	(Poland) Kacper Sezonienko	(Poland) Lechia Gdańsk	Undisclosed		
18 August 2026	DF	(Poland) Pawel Dawidowicz	(Poland) Raków Częstochowa	Free		
18 August 2026	MF	(Italy) Nunzio Lella	(Italy) Venezia	Undisclosed		
1 September 2026	MF	(Italy) Edoardo Iannoni	(Italy) Sassuolo	Undisclosed		
1 September 2026	FW	(Ghana) Caleb Ekuban	(Italy) Genoa	Free		

==== Loans In ====
Date	Pos.	Player	From	Fee	Notes	Ref.
11 July 2026	DF	(Luxembourg) Seid Korać	(Italy) Venezia	Loan	Option to buy for an undisclosed fee under conditions	
29 July 2026	FW	(Italy) Mattia Compagnon	(Italy) Venezia	Loan	Option to buy for an undisclosed fee under conditions	
31 July 2026	FW	(Italy) Samuele Mulattieri	(Italy) Sassuolo	Loan	Option to buy for an undisclosed fee under conditions	
14 August 2026	MF	(France) Andréa Le Borgne	(Italy) Como	Loan	Option and counter-option to buy	
28 August 2026	DF	(Italy) Gabriele Zappa	(Italy) Cagliari	Loan	Option to buy for an undisclosed fee under conditions	

==== Out ====
Date	Pos.	Player	To	Fee	Notes	Ref.
29 June 2026	FW	(France) Mathis Lambourde	(Switzerland) Servette	Undisclosed		
30 June 2026	DF	(Germany) Armel Bella-Kotchap	(Italy) Venezia	Undisclosed		
19 August 2026	GK	(Italy) Lorenzo Montipò	(Italy) Venezia	Undisclosed		
1 September 2026	MF	(Algeria) Rafik Belghali	(Italy) Torino	Undisclosed		
1 September 2026	DF	(England) Daniel Oyegoke	(England) Lincoln City	Undisclosed		

==== Loans Out ====
Date	Pos.	Player	To	Fee	Notes	Ref.
11 June 2026	MF	(Serbia) Stefan Mitrovic	(Serbia) Vojvodina	Loan	Option to buy for an undisclosed fee	
31 July 2026	FW	(Scotland) Kieron Bowie	(Italy) Sassuolo	Loan	Option to buy for an undisclosed fee	
31 July 2026	DF	(Spain) Yellu Santiago	(Portugal) Marítimo	Loan		
20 August 2026	MF	(Senegal) Cheikh Niasse	(Turkey) Gençlerbirliği	Loan	Option to buy for an undisclosed fee	
20 August 2026	FW	(Brazil) Isaac	(Croatia) NK Istra	Loan	Option to buy for an undisclosed fee	
29 August 2026	MF	(Brazil) Charlys	(Italy) Inter U23	Loan	Option to buy for an undisclosed fee	

== Friendlies ==
=== Pre-season ===
19 July 2026 Friendly	Hellas Verona (Italy)	8–1	(Italy) FC Rovereto	Folgaria
17:30	Suslov 4', 34'; Sarr 8'; Bowie 25'; Kastanos 28'; Bradarić 30'; Isaac 69'; Vermeșan 89'	Report	Grossi 16'	Stadium: Stadio La Pineta; Referee: Mattia Tinelli

22 July 2026 Friendly	Hellas Verona (Italy)	2–1	(Italy) Virtus Verona	Folgaria
17:30	Harroui 21'; Bernède 42'	Report	Ferraj 90'	Stadium: Stadio La Pineta; Referee: Marco Melloni

25 July 2026 Friendly	Hellas Verona (Italy)	1–0	(Italy) Dolomiti Bellunesi	Folgaria
17:30	Sarr 45'	Report		Stadium: Stadio La Pineta; Referee: Thomas Manzini

2 August 2026 Friendly	Hellas Verona (Italy)	3–0	(Italy) Lecco	Villafranca
17:30	Edmundsson 31'; Harroui 59'; Mulattieri 63'	Report		Stadium: Campo Sportivo Comunale; Attendance: 810; Referee: Lorenzo Lena

7 August 2026 Friendly	Hellas Verona (Italy)	0–1	(Italy) Cremonese	Castelnuovo del Garda
16:30		Report	Stückler 33'	Stadium: Sporting Center Paradiso; Referee: Andrea Copelli
Note: Behind close doors

2 October 2026 Friendly	Lugano (Switzerland)	1–3	(Italy) Hellas Verona	Lugano
11:30	Castro 46'	Report	Mosquera 19'; Sezonienko 28'; Iannoni 56'	Stadium: AIL Arena; Referee: Luca Piccolo
Note: Behind close doors

== Competitions ==
=== Overall record ===
Competition	First match	Last match	Starting round	Final position	Record							
Competition	First match	Last match	Starting round	Final position	Pld	W	D	L	GF	GA	GD	Win %
Serie B	23 August 2026	May 2027	Matchday 1	TBD	11	4	4	3	19	13	+6	36.36
Coppa Italia	16 August 2026	TBD	First Round	TBD	2	1	1	0	4	3	+1	50.00
Total					13	5	5	3	23	16	+7	38.46

Last updated: 10 July 2026
Source: Soccerway

=== Serie B ===
==== League table ====
Pos	Team	Pld	W	D	L	GF	GA	GD	Pts	Qualification or relegation
3	Ascoli	11	5	5	1	17	7	+10	20	Qualification for the promotion play-offs semi-finals
4	Mantova	11	5	4	2	15	11	+4	19	Qualification for the promotion play-offs semi-finals
5	Hellas Verona	11	4	4	3	19	13	+6	16	Qualification for the promotion play-offs quarter-finals
6	Avellino	11	4	4	3	16	11	+5	16	Qualification for the promotion play-offs quarter-finals
7	Benevento	11	4	4	3	15	11	+4	16	Qualification for the promotion play-offs quarter-finals

Updated to match(es) played on 8 November 2026. Source: Serie B
Rules for classification: 1) Points; 2) Head-to-head points; 3) Head-to-head goal difference; 4) Goal difference; 5) Goals scored; 6) Draw.

==== Results summary ====
Overall								Home						Away					
Pld	W	D	L	GF	GA	GD	Pts	W	D	L	GF	GA	GD	W	D	L	GF	GA	GD
11	4	4	3	19	13	+6	16	3	2	1	14	6	+8	1	2	2	5	7	−2

Last updated: July 2026.

==== Results by round ====
Round	1	2	3	4	5	6	7	8	9	10	11	12	13	14	15	16	17	18	19	20	21	22	23	24	25	26	27	28	29	30	31	32	33	34	35	36	37	38
Ground	H	A	H	A	H	A	H	H	A	H	A	H	A	A	H	H	A	H	A	A	H	A	H	A	A	H	A	H	A	H	A	H	A	H	A	H	A	H
Result	L	D	W	L	W	L	D	D	W	W	D																											
Position	16	16	10	13	6	9	11	11	9	5	5																											

Updated to match(es) played on June 2026. Source:
A = Away; H = Home; W = Win; D = Draw; L = Loss

==== Matches ====
23 August 2026 1	Hellas Verona	1–2	Ascoli	Verona
19:00 CEST	Mulattieri 21'; Le Borgne (yellow card) 41'; Cham (yellow card) 65'	Report	Corradini (yellow card) 39'; Silipo 53'; D'Uffizi 56'; D'Uffizi (yellow card) 66'; Guiebre (yellow card) 71'	Stadium: Stadio Marcantonio Bentegodi; Attendance: 16,036; Referee: Marco Di Loreto

29 August 2026 2	Padova	1–1	Hellas Verona	Padua
21:00 CEST	Fusi (yellow card) 18'; Pastina (yellow card) 24'; Edmundsson 25' (o.g.); Giunti (yellow card) 75'; Cappelli (yellow card) 90'	Report	Slotsager (yellow card) 27'; Sarr 67' (pen.)	Stadium: Stadio Euganeo; Referee: Fabio Maresca

6 September 2026 3	Hellas Verona	5–0	Arezzo	Verona
17:15 CEST	Harroui (yellow card) 3'; Livramento (yellow card) 39'; Zappa 50'; Mulattieri 58'; Cerbone 75', 78'; Iannoni 85'	Report	Illanes (red card) 40'; Mawuli (yellow card) 90'	Stadium: Stadio Marcantonio Bentegodi; Attendance: 16,559; Referee: Luca Zufferli

11 September 2026 4	Benevento	3–1	Hellas Verona	Benevento
21:00 CEST	Pierozzi 17'; Kouan (yellow card) 48'; Okereke 59'; Lamesta 65'; Siatounis (yellow card) 74'	Report	Sarr 24'; Sarr (yellow card) 32'; Korac (yellow card) 63'; Cerbone (yellow card) 88'	Stadium: Stadio Ciro Vigorito; Referee: Livio Marinelli

20 September 2026 5	Hellas Verona	2–1	Vicenza	Verona
15:00 CEST	Suslov (yellow card) 37'; Edmunsson (yellow card) 45+1'; Mosquera 74', 76'; Lella (yellow card) 85'; Livramento (yellow card) 90+1'	Report	Brighenti (yellow card) 49'; Rauti 58'; Valoti (yellow card) 70'	Stadium: Stadio Marcantonio Bentegodi; Attendance: 19.884; Referee: Andrea Colombo

11 October 2026 6	Modena	3–2	Hellas Verona	Modena
19:30 CEST	Caso 13'; Bianco (yellow card) 16'; Montevago 85'; Belotti 90+5'; Belotti (yellow card) 90+7'	Report	Mosquera 24', 28'; Le Borgne (yellow card) 45+2'; Edmundsson (yellow card) 54' (yellow-red card) 77'	Stadium: Stadio Alberto Braglia; Referee: Alberto Ruben Arena

16 October 2026 7	Hellas Verona	2–2	Catanzaro	Verona
20:30 CEST	Mosquera 37', 67'; Livramento (yellow card) 41'	Report	Candela 11'; Pecorino 75' (pen.); Alesi (yellow card) 76'; Imperiale (yellow card) 90+1'	Stadium: Stadio Marcantonio Bentegodi; Attendance: 18,038; Referee: Mario Perri

25 October 2026 8	Hellas Verona	1–1	Pisa	Verona
17:15 CEST	Iannoni 51'; Lella (red card) 90+2'	Report	Bozhinov (yellow card) 47'; Calabresi (yellow card) 50'; Marras 84'; Piccinini (yellow card) 90+5'	Stadium: Stadio Marcantonio Bentegodi; Attendance: 16,992; Referee: Niccolò Turrini

28 October 2026 9	Juve Stabia	0–1	Hellas Verona	Castellammare di Stabia
20:00 CEST		Report	Edmundsson (yellow card) 59'; Harroui 87'	Stadium: Stadio Romeo Menti; Referee: Claudio Giuseppe Allegretta

1 November 2026 10	Hellas Verona	3–0	Carrarese	Verona
17:15 CEST	Harroui 10'; Mosquera 22'; Sarr 38'; Livramento (yellow card) 64'	Report		Stadium: Stadio Marcantonio Bentegodi; Attendance: 15,863; Referee: Paride Tremolada

7 November 2026 11	Mantova	0–0	Hellas Verona	Mantua
17:15 CEST	Kouda (yellow card) 43'	Report	Edmundsson (yellow card) 35'; Zappa (yellow card) 62'	Stadium: Stadio Danilo Martelli; Referee: Giuseppe Collu

=== Coppa Italia ===
16 August 2026 First round	Hellas Verona	2–2 (3–2 p)	Virtus Entella	Verona
20:45 CEST	Compagnon 20'; Sarr 36'	Report	Guiu 16'; Squizzato (yellow card) 43'; Di Mario (yellow card) 44'; Franzoni 86' (pen.); Previtali (yellow card) 89'	Stadium: Stadio Marcantonio Bentegodi; Attendance: 7,559; Referee: Edoardo Manedo Mazzoni
	Penalties
	Mulattieri (penalty scored); Kastanos (penalty scored); Bernede (penalty missed); Edmundsson (penalty scored)		Felippe (penalty scored); Guiu (penalty missed); Franzoni (penalty scored); Corona (penalty missed); Tirelli (penalty missed)

3 September 2026 Second round	Cagliari	1–2	Hellas Verona	Cagliari
21:00 CEST	Mendy 57'; Adopo (yellow card) 68'	Report	Harroui 23'; Iannoni (yellow card) 66'; Korač (yellow card) 73'; Mulattieri 87'	Stadium: Unipol Domus; Referee: Andrea Zanotti

12 January 2027 Round of 16	Roma	–	Hellas Verona	Rome
21:00 CET		Report		Stadium: Stadio Olimpico; Referee: TBA
