= 2025–26 Hellas Verona FC season =

Italian association football club season

Hellas Verona FC
2025–26 season
- Owner: Presidio Investors
- President: Italo Zanzi
- Head Coach: Paolo Zanetti (until 2 February); Paolo Sammarco (interim) (from 3 February)
- Stadium: Stadio Marcantonio Bentegodi
- Serie A: 19th (relegated)
- Coppa Italia: Round of 32
- Top goalscorer: League: Gift Orban (7); All: Gift Orban (7)
- Average home league attendance: 22,352
Home colours	Away colours	Third colours

The 2025–26 season was the 123rd season of Hellas Verona Football Club and the seventh consecutive season in Serie A. In addition to the domestic league, the team competed in the Coppa Italia.

== Squad ==
Note: Flags indicate national team as defined under FIFA eligibility rules; some limited exceptions apply. Players may hold more than one non-FIFA nationality.

No.	Pos.	Nation	Player
1	GK	ITA	Lorenzo Montipò
2	DF	ENG	Daniel Oyegoke
3	DF	DEN	Martin Frese
4	DF	SLO	Sandi Lovric (on loan from Udinese)
5	DF	FRO	Andrias Edmundsson
6	DF	ARG	Nicolás Valentini (on loan from Fiorentina)
7	DF	ALG	Rafik Belghali
8	MF	GER	Suat Serdar (captain)
9	FW	SWE	Amin Sarr
10	MF	SEN	Cheikh Niasse
11	MF	CIV	Jean-Daniel Akpa Akpro
12	DF	CRO	Domagoj Bradarić
15	DF	DEN	Victor Nelsson (on loan from Galatasaray)
16	FW	NGR	Gift Orban (on loan from Hoffenheim)
18	FW	SCO	Kieron Bowie

No.	Pos.	Nation	Player
19	DF	DEN	Tobias Slotsager
21	MF	MAR	Abdou Harroui
24	MF	FRA	Antoine Bernède
29	MF	ESP	Pol Lirola
30	FW	BRA	Isaac
31	MF	SVK	Tomáš Suslov
34	GK	ITA	Simone Perilli
35	FW	COL	Daniel Mosquera
37	DF	GER	Armel Bella-Kotchap
63	MF	ITA	Roberto Gagliardini
70	DF	GAM	Fallou Cham
72	FW	CIV	Junior Ajayi
73	MF	LBA	Moatasem Al-Musrati (on loan from Beşiktaş)
90	FW	ROU	Ioan Vermeșan
94	GK	ITA	Giacomo Toniolo

== Transfers ==
=== Summer window ===
==== In ====
Date	Pos.	Player	From	Fee	Notes	Ref.
30 June 2025	GK	(Italy) Mattia Chiesa	(United Arab Emirates) Sporting Dubai	Free	Return from loan	
30 June 2025	GK	(Italy) Giacomo Toniolo	(Italy) Lumezzane	Free	Return from loan	
1 July 2025	DF	(The Gambia) Fallou Cham	(Italy) Scafatese	Undisclosed		
1 July 2025	DF	(Albania) Adi Kurti	(Italy) Empoli	Free	To Primavera squad	
1 July 2025	MF	(France) Antoine Bernede	(Switzerland) Lausanne-Sport	€2,000,000	From loan to definitive purchase	
1 July 2025	MF	(Cyprus) Grigoris Kastanos	(Italy) Salernitana	€1,200,000	From loan to definitive purchase	
1 July 2025	MF	(Senegal) Cheikh Niasse	(Switzerland) Young Boys	€3,500,000	From loan to definitive purchase	
1 July 2025	FW	(Sweden) Amin Sarr	(France) Lyon	€3,500,000	From loan to definitive purchase	
8 July 2025	FW	(Brazil) Giovane	(Brazil) Corinthians	Free		
24 July 2025	MF	(Spain) Yellu Santiago	(Spain) Getafe	Free		
3 August 2025	DF	(Croatia) Domagoj Bradarić	(Italy) Salernitana	€750,000	From loan to definitive purchase	
19 August 2025	DF	(Algeria) Rafik Belghali	(Belgium) Mechelen	€2,000,000		
6 September 2025	MF	(Ivory Coast) Jean-Daniel Akpa-Akpro	(Italy) Lazio	Free		
12 September 2025	MF	(Italy) Roberto Gagliardini	(Italy) Monza	Free		

==== Loans in ====
Date	Pos.	Player	From	Fee	Notes	Ref.
15 July 2025	DF	(Cameroon) Enzo Ebosse	(Italy) Udinese	Undisclosed	Option to buy for an undisclosed fee under conditions	
22 July 2025	DF	(Argentina) Nicolás Valentini	(Italy) Fiorentina	Undisclosed	Option to buy for an undisclosed fee	
25 July 2025	DF	(Spain) Unai Núñez	(Spain) Celta de Vigo	Undisclosed	Option to buy for an undisclosed fee	
21 August 2025	DF	(Denmark) Victor Nelsson	(Turkey) Galatasaray	€650,000	Option to buy for an undisclosed fee	
27 August 2025	DF	(Germany) Armel Bella-Kotchap	(England) Southampton	€500,000	Option to buy for €5,000,000	
27 August 2025	FW	(Nigeria) Gift Orban	(Germany) Hoffenheim	€500,000	Option to buy for an undisclosed fee	
29 August 2025	MF	(Libya) Moatasem Al-Musrati	(Turkey) Beşiktaş	€2,000,000	Option to buy for an undisclosed fee	

==== Out ====
Date	Pos.	Player	To	Fee	Notes	Ref.
30 June 2025	DF	(Austria) Flavius Daniliuc	(Italy) Salernitana	Free	Return from loan	
30 June 2025	DF	(France) Yllan Okou	(France) Bastia	Free	Return from loan	
30 June 2025	FW	(Denmark) Casper Tengstedt	(Portugal) Benfica	Free	Return from loan	
1 July 2025	DF	(Poland) Pawel Dawidowicz	Unattached	Free	End of contract	
1 July 2025	DF	(Italy) Davide Faraoni	(Italy) Pescara	Free	End of contract	
1 July 2025	MF	(Serbia) Darko Lazović	(United Arab Emirates) Al-Wahda	Free	End of contract	
1 July 2025	GK	(Italy) Elia Boseggia	(Italy) Novara	Undisclosed		
1 July 2025	DF	(Italy) Diego Coppola	(England) Brighton & Hove Albion	€11,000,000		
3 July 2025	DF	(Italy) Edoardo Bernardi	(Italy) Arzignano Valchiampo	Undisclosed		
3 July 2025	FW	(France) Thomas Henry	(Belgium) Standard Liège	Free	Contract termination	
9 July 2025	MF	(Poland) Mateusz Praszelik	(Poland) Cracovia	Undisclosed		
10 July 2025	DF	(Brazil) Luan Patrick	(Portugal) Estrela Amadora	Undisclosed		
14 July 2025	GK	(Italy) Alessandro Berardi	Unattached	Free	End of contract	
15 July 2025	DF	(Italy) Mattia Rigo	(Italy) Carpi	Free	End of contract	
16 July 2025	MF	(Slovakia) Ondrej Duda	(Saudi Arabia) Al-Ettifaq	Free	End of contract	
22 July 2025	DF	(Germany) Koray Günter	(Saudi Arabia) Al-Okhdood	Free	End of contract	
1 August 2025	FW	(Italy) Richi Agbonifo	(Italy) Inter Milan U23	Undisclosed	From Primavera squad	
14 August 2025	FW	(Sierra Leone) Yayah Kallon	(Italy) Casertana	Undisclosed		
19 August 2025	MF	(Cameroon) Jackson Tchatchoua	(England) Wolverhampton Wanderers	€12,500,000		
21 August 2025	FW	(Italy) Kevin Lasagna	(Italy) Padova	Undisclosed		
30 August 2025	FW	(Italy) Mattia Florio	(Italy) Team Altamura	Undisclosed		
1 September 2025	FW	(Netherlands) Jayden Braaf	Unattached	Free	Contract termination	

==== Loans out ====
Date	Pos.	Player	To	Fee	Notes	Ref.
15 July 2025	FW	(Netherlands) Elayis Tavşan	(Italy) Reggiana	Free		
16 July 2025	DF	(Italy) Christian Corradi	(Italy) Trento	Free		
17 July 2025	FW	(Italy) Nicola Patanè	(Italy) Virtus Verona	Free		
18 July 2025	FW	(Italy) Denis Cazzadori	(Italy) Union Brescia	Free	Obligation to buy for an undisclosed fee under conditions	
1 August 2025	MF	(Italy) Alphadjo Cissè	(Italy) Catanzaro	Free		
2 August 2025	DF	(Italy) Daniele Ghilardi	(Italy) Roma	€2,500,000	Option to buy for €8,000,000 under conditions	
5 August 2025	FW	(Argentina) Juan Manuel Cruz	(Italy) Trento	Free		
11 August 2025	DF	(Italy) Nicolò Calabrese	(Italy) Carrarese	Free		
21 August 2025	MF	(Morocco) Aiman Rihai	(Italy) Lumezzane	Free		
28 August 2025	MF	(Italy) Federico Magro	(Italy) Foggia	Free		
31 August 2025	MF	(Brazil) Charlys	(Italy) Reggiana	Free		
1 September 2025	FW	(France) Mathis Lambourde	(Italy) Reggiana	Free	Option to buy for an undisclosed fee	
1 September 2025	FW	(Cape Verde) Dailon Livramento	(Portugal) Casa Pia	Free	Option to buy for an undisclosed fee	
2 September 2025	FW	(Serbia) Stefan Mitrović	(Netherlands) Excelsior	Free	Option to buy for an undisclosed fee	

=== Winter window ===
==== In ====
Date	Pos.	Player	From	Fee	Notes	Ref.
9 January 2026	GK	(Brazil) Arthur Borghi	(Brazil) Corinthians	Free		
9 January 2026	FW	(Brazil) Isaac	(Brazil) Atlético Mineiro	Free		
16 January 2026	FW	(Netherlands) Elayis Tavşan	(Italy) Reggiana	€100,000	Loan terminated early	
18 January 2026	MF	(Spain) Pol Lirola	(France) Marseille	Free		
30 January 2026	FW	(Scotland) Kieron Bowie	(Scotland) Hibernian	€6,000,000		
30 January 2026	FW	(Serbia) Stefan Mitrović	(Netherlands) Excelsior	Free	Loan terminated early	
1 February 2026	FW	(Italy) Alphadjo Cissè	(Italy) Catanzaro	Free	Loan terminated early	
2 February 2026	DF	(Faroe Islands) Andrias Edmundsson	(Poland) Wisła Płock	€2,500,000		
2 February 2026	DF	(Germany) Armel Bella-Kotchap	(England) Southampton	€5,000,000	From loan to definitive purchase	

==== Loans in ====
Date	Pos.	Player	From	Fee	Notes	Ref.
30 January 2026	MF	(Slovenia) Sandi Lovrić	(Italy) Udinese	Free		

==== Out ====
Date	Pos.	Player	To	Fee	Notes	Ref.
16 January 2026	FW	(Netherlands) Elayis Tavşan	(Turkey) Samsunspor	€1,500,000		
24 January 2026	DF	(Spain) Unai Núñez	(Spain) Celta de Vigo	Free	Loan terminated early	
24 January 2026	FW	(Brazil) Giovane	(Italy) Napoli	€2,000,000		
2 February 2026	DF	(Cameroon) Enzo Ebosse	(Italy) Udinese	Free	Loan terminated early	
2 February 2026	FW	(Italy) Alphadjo Cissè	(Italy) AC Milan	€8,000,000		
18 February 2026	GK	(Italy) Mattia Chiesa	(Slovenia) Gorica	Free		

==== Loans out ====
Date	Pos.	Player	To	Fee	Notes	Ref.
9 January 2026	MF	(Spain) Yellu Santiago	(Portugal) Arouca	Free		
29 January 2026	DF	(Albania) Adi Kurti	(Italy) Ternana	Free	Obligation to buy for an undisclosed fee + buy-back option for an undisclosed fee	
2 February 2026	FW	(Serbia) Stefan Mitrović	(Greece) Asteras Tripolis	Free		
2 February 2026	MF	(Cyprus) Grigoris Kastanos	(Cyprus) Aris Limassol	Free		

== Friendlies ==
=== Pre-season ===
16 July 2025 Friendly	Hellas Verona (Italy)	6–0	(Italy) Top 22 Calcio Dilettanti	Folgaria
17:30	Livramento 23'; Beghin 25' (o.g.); Sarr 33'; Agbonifo 58'; Ajayi 76'; De Battisti 87'	Report		Stadium: Stadio La Pineta; Attendance: 600; Referee: Gabriele Caresia

20 July 2025 Friendly	Hellas Verona (Italy)	9–0	(Italy) FC Rovereto	Folgaria
17:30	Frese 10'; Niasse 15'; Livramento 35'; Sarr 38'; Cissè 55', 68'; Giovane 65'; Kastanos 79'; Vermesan 90'	Report		Stadium: Stadio La Pineta; Attendance: 1.480; Referee: Antonio Atanasov

27 July 2025 Friendly	Hellas Verona (Italy)	6–0	(Italy) Virtus Verona	Folgaria
17:30	Giovane 1', 3'; Frese 21'; Livramento 49'; Ajayi 78'; Vermesan 90'	Report		Stadium: Stadio La Pineta; Referee: Andrea Zanotti

3 August 2025 Friendly	Südtirol (Italy)	2–2	(Italy) Hellas Verona	Bolzano
18:30	Casiraghi 8'; Kofler 83'	Report	Giovane 47'; Frese 85'	Stadium: Stadio Druso; Referee: Daniele Perenzoni

9 August 2025 Friendly	St. Pauli (Germany)	1–0	(Italy) Hellas Verona	Imst
16:00	Hountondji 14'	Report		Stadium: Velly Arena; Referee: Stefan Macanovi

10 August 2025 Friendly	Hellas Verona (Italy)	1–0	(Japan) JUFA	Castelnuovo del Garda
17:00	Mosquera 87'	Report		Stadium: Sporting Center Paradiso; Referee: Federico Bruschi

== Competitions ==
=== Overall record ===
Competition	First match	Last match	Starting round	Final position	Record							
Competition	First match	Last match	Starting round	Final position	Pld	W	D	L	GF	GA	GD	Win %
Serie A	24 August 2025	24 May 2026	Matchday 1	19th	38	3	12	23	25	61	−36	7.89
Coppa Italia	18 August 2025	24 September 2025	Round of 64	Round of 32	2	0	2	0	1	1	+0	0.00
Total					40	3	14	23	26	62	−36	7.50

Last updated: 9 November 2025
Source: Soccerway

=== Serie A ===
==== League table ====
Pos	Team	Pld	W	D	L	GF	GA	GD	Pts	Qualification or relegation
16	Genoa	38	10	11	17	41	51	−10	41	
17	Lecce	38	10	8	20	28	50	−22	38	
18	Cremonese (R)	38	8	10	20	32	57	−25	34	Relegation to Serie B
19	Hellas Verona (R)	38	3	12	23	25	61	−36	21	Relegation to Serie B
20	Pisa (R)	38	2	12	24	26	71	−45	18	Relegation to Serie B

Source: Serie A
Rules for classification: 1) Points; 2) Tiebreaker for Champions team and third relegated team; 3) Head-to-head points; 4) Head-to-head goal difference; 5) Goal difference; 6) Goals scored; 7) Draw.
(Note: Head-to-head record is used only after all the matches between the teams in question have been played)
(R) Relegated

==== Results summary ====
Overall								Home						Away					
Pld	W	D	L	GF	GA	GD	Pts	W	D	L	GF	GA	GD	W	D	L	GF	GA	GD
38	3	12	23	25	61	−36	21	1	5	13	12	28	−16	2	7	10	13	33	−20

Last updated: June 2025.
Source: Serie A

==== Results by round ====
Round	1	2	3	4	5	6	7	8	9	10	11	12	13	14	15	16	17	18	19	20	21	22	23	24	25	26	27	28	29	30	31	32	33	34	35	36	37	38
Ground	A	A	H	H	A	H	A	H	A	H	A	H	A	H	A	H	A	H	A	H	A	H	A	H	A	A	H	A	H	A	H	A	H	H	A	H	A	H
Result	D	L	D	D	L	L	D	D	L	L	D	L	L	W	W	L	L	L	D	L	D	L	L	D	L	L	L	W	L	L	L	L	L	D	D	L	D	L
Position	10	18	16	15	17	18	17	17	18	19	19	20	20	19	18	18	20	20	19	20	20	20	20	20	20	20	20	19	19	19	19	19	19	19	19	19	19	19

Updated to match(es) played on June 2025. Source: Serie A
A = Away; H = Home; W = Win; D = Draw; L = Loss

==== Matches ====
25 August 2025 1	Udinese	1–1	Hellas Verona	Udine
18:30 CEST (UTC+2)	Iker Bravo (yellow card) 33'; Kristensen 53'; Davis (yellow card) 70'; Bertola (yellow card) 88'	Report	Serdar 73'; Ebosse (yellow card) 85'; Belghali (yellow card) 90+3'	Stadium: BluEnergy Stadium; Attendance: 20,706; Referee: Paride Tremolada

31 August 2025 2	Lazio	4–0	Hellas Verona	Rome
20:45 CEST (UTC+2)	Guendouzi 3'; Zaccagni 10'; Castellanos 41'; Dia 82'	Report		Stadium: Stadio Olimpico; Referee: Valerio Crezzini

15 September 2025 3	Hellas Verona	0–0	Cremonese	Verona
18:30 CEST (UTC+2)	Serdar (yellow card) 43'; Giovane (yellow card) 45+2'	Report	Collocolo (yellow card) 78'	Stadium: Stadio Marcantonio Bentegodi; Attendance: 21,406; Referee: Alberto Ruben Arena

20 September 2025 4	Hellas Verona	1–1	Juventus	Verona
18:00 CEST (UTC+2)	Akpa Akpro (yellow card) 7'; Orban 44' (pen.); Orban (yellow card) 45+2'; Bernède (yellow card) 76'	Report	Gatti (yellow card) 9'; Conceição 19'; Kelly (yellow card) 39'; Koopmeiners (yellow card) 65'	Stadium: Stadio Marcantonio Bentegodi; Attendance: 27,783; Referee: Antonio Rapuano

28 September 2025 5	Roma	2–0	Hellas Verona	Rome
20:45 CEST (UTC+2)	Dovbyk 7'; Soulé 79'	Report	Akpa Akpro (yellow card) 12'; Nuñez (yellow card) 45+1'; Gagliardini (yellow card) 53'; Belghali (yellow card) 90+1'	Stadium: Stadio Olimpico; Referee: Ermanno Feliciani

3 October 2025 6	Hellas Verona	0–1	Sassuolo	Verona
15:00 CEST (UTC+2)	Serdar (yellow card) 44'; Belghali (yellow card) 90+1'	Report	Pierini (yellow card) 64'; Pinamonti 72'; Muric (yellow card) 75'	Stadium: Stadio Marcantonio Bentegodi; Attendance: 21,963; Referee: Francesco Fourneau

18 October 2025 7	Pisa	0–0	Hellas Verona	Pisa
15:00 CEST (UTC+2)	Akinsanmiro (yellow card) 65'; Piccinini (yellow card) 78'; Canestrelli (yellow card) 87'; Tramoni (yellow card) 90+5'	Report	Frese (yellow card) 88'; Núñez (yellow card) 90+5'	Stadium: Cetilar® Arena; Referee: Marco Guida

26 October 2025 8	Hellas Verona	2–2	Cagliari	Verona
15:00 CEST (UTC+2)	Gagliardini 23'; Akpa Akpro (yellow card) 41'; Gagliardini (yellow card) 53'; Nelsson (yellow card) 57'; Orban 59'	Report	Obert (yellow card) 65'; Pavoletti (yellow card) 66'; Idrissi 77'; Mazzitelli (yellow card) 89'; Felici 90+2'; Borrelli (yellow card) 90+4'	Stadium: Stadio Marcantonio Bentegodi; Attendance: 24,344; Referee: Federico Dionisi

29 October 2025 9	Como	3–1	Hellas Verona	Como
18:30 CEST (UTC+2)	Douvikas 9'; Paz (yellow card) 55'; Posch 62'; Vojvoda 90+2'	Report	Serdar 25'; Gagliardini (yellow card) 26'; Belghali (yellow card) 39'; Nelsson (yellow card) 60'; Orban (yellow card) 90+4'	Stadium: Stadio Giuseppe Sinigaglia; Referee: Matteo Marcenaro

2 November 2025 10	Hellas Verona	1–2	Inter	Verona
12:30 CEST (UTC+2)	Giovane 40'; Orban (yellow card) 41'; Bella-Kotchap (yellow card) 90+6'	Report	Zieliński 16'; Bisseck (yellow card) 66'; Frese 90+3' (o.g.)	Stadium: Stadio Marcantonio Bentegodi; Attendance: 26,696; Referee: Daniele Doveri

8 November 2025 11	Lecce	0–0	Hellas Verona	Lecce
15:00 CEST (UTC+2)	Coulibaly (yellow card) 40'	Report	Akpa Akpro (yellow card) 31'; Valentini (yellow card) 43'; Bradarić (yellow card) 54'; Frese (yellow card) 90+2'	Stadium: Stadio Via del mare Referee: Rosario Abisso

23 November 2025 12	Hellas Verona	1–2	Parma	Verona
12:30 CEST (UTC+2)	Giovane (yellow card) 42'; Al-Musrati (yellow card) 55'; Giovane 65'; Nuñez (yellow card) 70'; Frese (yellow card) 89'	Report	Delprato (yellow card) 9'; Pellegrino 18', 80'; Pellegrino (yellow card) 39'	Stadium: Stadio Marcantonio Bentegodi; Attendance: 26,266; Referee: Luca Pairetto

29 November 2025 13	Genoa	2–1	Hellas Verona	Genoa
15:00 CEST (UTC+2)	Thorsby (yellow card) 27'; Colombo 40'; Thorsby 62'	Report	Belghali 21'; Mosquera (yellow card) 39'; Nuñez (yellow card) 47'; Gagliardini (yellow card) 73'	Stadium: Stadio Luigi Ferraris; Referee: Michael Fabbri

6 December 2025 14	Hellas Verona	3–1	Atalanta	Verona
20:45 CEST (UTC+2)	Belghali 28'; Giovane 36'; Nelsson (yellow card) 45'; Frese (yellow card) 50'; Bernède 71'	Report	de Roon (yellow card) 65'; Scamacca 81' (pen.)	Stadium: Stadio Marcantonio Bentegodi; Attendance: 20,949; Referee: Maurizio Mariani

14 December 2025 15	Fiorentina	1–2	Hellas Verona	Florence
15:00 CEST (UTC+2)	Guðmundsson (yellow card) 36'; Nuñez 69' (o.g.)	Report	Niasse (yellow card) 25'; Frese (yellow card) 32'; Al-Musrati (yellow card) 39'; Orban 42', 90+3'; Belghali (yellow card) 85'; Nuñez (yellow card) 90+5'	Stadium: Stadio Artemio Franchi; Referee: Andrea Colombo

28 December 2025 17	Milan	3–0	Hellas Verona	Milan
12:30 CET (UTC+1)	Pulisic 45+1'; Nkunku 48' (pen.), 53'	Report	Al-Musrati (yellow card) 43'	Stadium: San Siro; Referee: Michael Fabbri

4 January 2026 18	Hellas Verona	0–3	Torino	Verona
18:00 CET (UTC+1)		Report	Simeone 10'; Paleari (yellow card) 56'; Aboukhlal (yellow card) 71'; Casadei 87'; Njie 90+1'	Stadium: Stadio Marcantonio Bentegodi; Attendance: 21,860; Referee: Antonio Rapuano

7 January 2025 19	Napoli	2–2	Hellas Verona	Naples
15:00 CEST (UTC+2)	McTominay 54'; Di Lorenzo 82'	Report	Frese 16'; Orban 27'; Orban (yellow card) 28'; Bradarić (yellow card) 52'; Bella-Kotchap (yellow card) 75'	Stadium: Stadio Diego Armando Maradona; Referee: Matteo Marchetti

11 January 2026 20	Hellas Verona	0–1	Lazio	Verona
18:00 CET (UTC+1)	Bella-Kotchap (yellow card) 6'; Valentini (yellow card) 25'	Report	Cancellieri (yellow card) 18'; Nelsson 79' (o.g.)	Stadium: Stadio Marcantonio Bentegodi; Attendance: 22,029; Referee: Marco Guida

15 January 2026 16	Hellas Verona	2–3	Bologna	Verona
18:30 CET (UTC+1)	Núñez (yellow card) 12'; Orban 13'; Freuler 71' (o.g.)	Report	Orsolini 21'; Odgaard 29'; Vitík (yellow card) 42'; Castro 44'; Orsolini (yellow card) 59'	Stadium: Stadio Marcantonio Bentegodi; Attendance: 17,585; Referee: Maurizio Mariani

19 January 2026 21	Cremonese	0–0	Hellas Verona	Cremona
18:30 CEST (UTC+2)	Bonazzoli (yellow card) 37'; Vandeputte (yellow card) 42'; Vardy (yellow card) 74'	Report		Stadium: Stadio Giovanni Zini; Referee: Alberto Ruben Arena

26 January 2026 22	Hellas Verona	1–3	Udinese	Verona
20:45 CET (UTC+1)	Orban 26'; Lirola (yellow card) 46'; Gagliardini (yellow card) 56'	Report	Atta 23'; Zanoli 58'; Davis 67'	Stadium: Stadio Marcantonio Bentegodi; Attendance: 18,720; Referee: Gianluca Manganiello

31 January 2026 23	Cagliari	4–0	Hellas Verona	Cagliari
20:45 CEST (UTC+2)	Mazzitelli 36'; Kılıçsoy 47'; Sulemana 84'; Idrissi 90+1'	Report	Sarr (yellow card) 6' (yellow-red card) 51'	Stadium: Unipol Domus; Referee: Kevin Bonacina

6 February 2026 24	Hellas Verona	0–0	Pisa	Verona
20:45 CEST (UTC+2)	Serdar (yellow card) 90+4'	Report	Moreo (yellow card) 32'; Marin (yellow card) 89'	Stadium: Stadio Marcantonio Bentegodi; Attendance: 19,470; Referee: Daniele Doveri

15 February 2026 25	Parma	2–1	Hellas Verona	Parma
15:00 CEST (UTC+2)	Bernabé 4'; Circati (yellow card) 41'; Valenti (yellow card) 47'; Pellegrino 90+3'	Report	Orban (red card) 11'; Harroui 43' (pen.); Akpa Akpro (yellow card) 86'	Stadium: Stadio Ennio Tardini; Referee: Luca Pairetto

20 February 2026 26	Sassuolo	3–0	Hellas Verona	Reggio Emilia
20:45 CEST (UTC+2)	Coulibaly (yellow card) 17'; Pinamonti 40'; Berardi 44', 62'; Walukiewicz (yellow card) 78'	Report	Edmundsson (yellow card) 39'; Ali Elmusrati (yellow card) 51' (yellow-red card) 85'	Stadium: Mapei Stadium; Referee: Livio Marinelli

28 February 2026 27	Hellas Verona	1–2	Napoli	Verona
18:00 CEST (UTC+2)	Akpa Akpro (yellow card) 47'; Akpa Akpro 65'; Suslov (yellow card) 74'; Harroui (yellow card) 82'	Report	Højlund 2'; Vergara (yellow card) 56'; Elmas (yellow card) 71'; Juan Jesus (yellow card) 90'; Lukaku 90+6'; Lukaku (yellow card) 90+7'	Stadium: Stadio Marcantonio Bentegodi; Attendance: 21,027; Referee: Andrea Colombo

8 March 2026 28	Bologna	1–2	Hellas Verona	Bologna
15:00 CEST (UTC+2)	Ferguson (yellow card) 40'; Rowe 49'	Report	Bowie (yellow card) 16'; Harroui (yellow card) 42'; Frese 53'; Bowie 57'	Stadium: Stadio Renato Dall'Ara; Referee: Giuseppe Mucera

15 March 2026 29	Hellas Verona	0–2	Genoa	Verona
12:30 CEST (UTC+2)	Oyegoke (yellow card) 6'; Akpa Akpro (yellow card) 31'	Report	Vitinha 61'; Vitinha (yellow card) 81'; Østigård 86'	Stadium: Stadio Marcantonio Bentegodi; Attendance: 22,989; Referee: Matteo Marchetti

22 March 2026 30	Atalanta	1–0	Hellas Verona	Bergamo
15:00 CEST (UTC+2)	Zappacosta 37'; Hien (yellow card) 83'	Report	Edmundsson (yellow card) 17'; Valentini (yellow card) 54'; Gagliardini (yellow card) 63'	Stadium: New Balance Arena; Referee: Giovanni Ayroldi

4 March 2026 31	Hellas Verona	0–1	Fiorentina	Verona
18:00 CEST (UTC+2)	Gagliardini (yellow card) 17'; Nelsson (yellow card) 79'; Suslov (red card) 85'; Belghali (yellow card) 88'	Report	Fagioli 82'; Fagioli (yellow card) 84'; Guðmundsson (red card) 85'	Stadium: Stadio Marcantonio Bentegodi; Attendance: 24,501; Referee: Marco Guida

11 April 2026 32	Torino	2–1	Hellas Verona	Turin
15:00 CEST (UTC+2)	Simeone 6'; Ismajli (yellow card) 25'; Casadei 50'	Report	Edmundsson (yellow card) 27'; Bowie 38'; Frese (yellow card) 46'; Oyegoke (yellow card) 65'; Valentini (yellow card) 90+5'	Stadium: Stadio Olimpico Grande Torino; Referee: Kevin Bonacina

19 April 2026 33	Hellas Verona	0–1	Milan	Verona
15:00 CEST (UTC+2)	Akpa Akpro (yellow card) 24'; Al-Musrati (yellow card) 84'	Report	Rabiot 41'	Stadium: Stadio Marcantonio Bentegodi; Attendance: 21,338; Referee: Daniele Chiffi

25 April 2026 34	Hellas Verona	0–0	Lecce	Verona
20:45 CEST (UTC+2)	Akpa Akpro (yellow card) 52'; Valentini (yellow card) 82'	Report	Coulibaly (yellow card) 12'; Ramadani (yellow card) 67'; Cheddira (yellow card) 86'; N'Dri (yellow card) 90+3'; Veiga (yellow card) 90+7'	Stadium: Stadio Marcantonio Bentegodi; Attendance: 19,407; Referee: Davide Massa

3 May 2026 35	Juventus	1–1	Hellas Verona	Turin
18:00 CEST (UTC+2)	Locatelli (yellow card) 33'; Vlahović 62'	Report	Gagliardini (yellow card) 5'; Frese (yellow card) 31'; Bowie 34'; Bernède (yellow card) 63'; Harroui (yellow card) 90+5'	Stadium: Allianz Stadium; Referee: Giovanni Ayroldi

10 May 2026 36	Hellas Verona	0–1	Como	Verona
12:30 CEST (UTC+2)	Frese (yellow card) 89'	Report	Caqueret (yellow card) 61'; Douvikas 71'	Stadium: Stadio Marcantonio Bentegodi; Attendance: 23,086; Referee: Marco Di Bello

17 May 2026 37	Inter	1–1	Hellas Verona	Milan
15:00 CET (UTC+1)	Edmundsson 47' (o.g.)	Report	Valentini (yellow card) 60'; Gagliardini (yellow card) 89'; Bowie 90+1'	Stadium: San Siro; Referee: Andrea Calzavara

24 May 2026 38	Hellas Verona	0–2	Roma	Verona
20:45 CEST (UTC+2)	Valentini (yellow card) 35' (yellow-red card) 50'; Lovrić (yellow card) 46'	Report	Malen 56'; Ziółkowski (yellow card) 71'; El Shaarawy 90+3'	Stadium: Stadio Marcantonio Bentegodi; Attendance: 23,277; Referee: Simone Sozza

=== Coppa Italia ===
18 August 2024 First round	Cerignola	1–1 (2–4 p)	Hellas Verona	Cerignola
18:00 CEST (UTC+2)	Cuppone (yellow card) 44'; Emmausso (yellow card) 62'; Lopez (yellow card) 80'; Lopez 90+1'	Report	Bradarić 55'; Serdar (yellow card) 75'; Frese (yellow card) 87'	Stadium: Stadio Domenico Monterisi; Referee: Luca Massimi
	Penalties
	Cretella (penalty scored); Russo (penalty missed); Faggioli (penalty missed); Lopez (penalty scored)		(penalty scored) Kastanos; (penalty scored) Sarr; (penalty scored) Livramento; (penalty missed) Yellu Santiago; (penalty scored) Serdar

24 September 2025 Second round	Hellas Verona	0–0 (4–5 p)	Venezia	Verona
18:30 CEST (UTC+2)	Niasse (yellow card) 7'; Ebosse (yellow card) 38'	Report	Lella (yellow card) 50'; Compagnon (yellow card) 75'; Casas (yellow card) 81'	Stadium: Stadio Marcantonio Bentegodi; Attendance: 7,021; Referee: Andrea Calzavara
	Penalties
	Kastanos (penalty scored); Ebosse (penalty missed); Al-Musrati (penalty scored); Giovane (penalty scored); Orban (penalty scored)		(penalty scored) Fila; (penalty scored) Yeboah; (penalty scored) Svoboda; (penalty scored) Bohinen; (penalty scored) Lella
