= Fort Sommo Alto =

Austro-Hungarian fortification in the Trentino

Coordinates: 45°53′30″N 11°12′02″E

Fort Sommo, also known as Fort Sommo Alto (Italian: Forte Sommo Alto, German: Zwischenwerk Sommo), is an Austro-Hungarian fort built in the Lavarone-Folgaria group, a group of forts built between the municipalities of Lavarone and Folgaria in Northern Italy. Fort Sommo was classed as an "intermediate work", meaning that it was less heavily armed than Fort Lusern and Fort Verle, but more heavily armed and armored than a roadblock. The fort was built between 1911 and September 25, 1914. Sommo was built to bridge the gap between the forts Sebastiano and Serrada. Overall, Sommo was considered the weakest of the seven forts of the Lavarone-Folgaria group in terms of armament and armor. The fortifications in the Lavarone-Folgaria group were also built to hold back the Italians while Austrian troops assembled for an attack against Veneto.

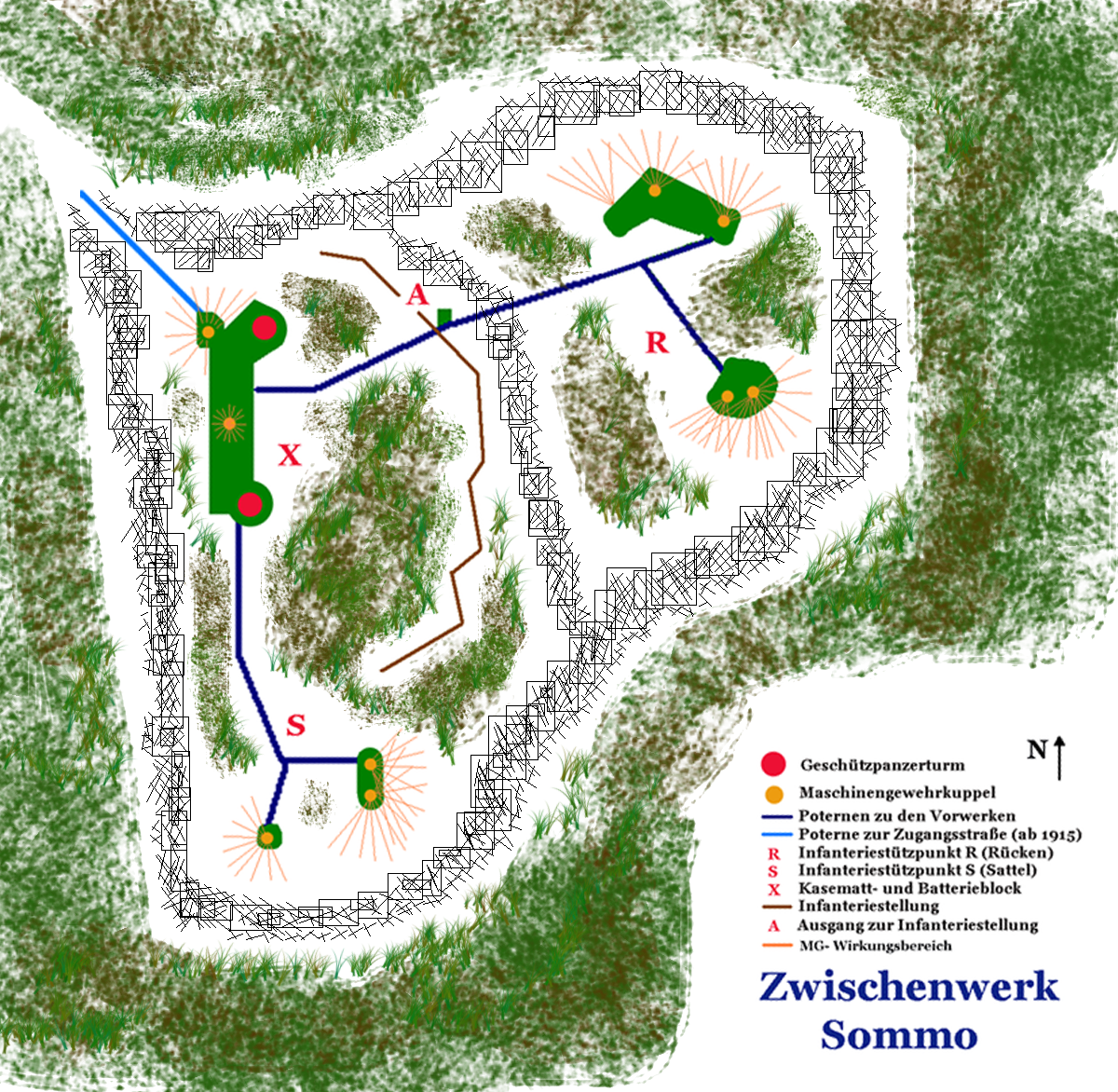
A drawing showing the layout of the fort and its firing angles. Infantry Work "S" is the bottom group and "R" is the one on the right.

== Construction ==
The fort was originally to have two 10 cm howitzers in casemates facing Fort Serrada, but this plan was dropped in favor of two 10 cm howitzers in 25 cm-thick rotating armored domes placed 140 ft apart. Two more tower howitzers (T.H.) were planned, but because of rising costs, they were placed in the casemate battery. The fort was built of steel-reinforced concrete in three distinct parts: the casemate battery and two smaller infantry works, "S" and "R", near the fort. Only the top floor was above ground, and the rear of the fort was dug into the rock. Three of the four sides were covered by earth, while the fourth was partially exposed to fit more guns facing the Italian border.

== Casemate block ==
The casemate block is rectangular and is anchored to the natural rock at each end. Its three floors were the basement, the 1st floor, and the 2nd floor, which housed the 10 cm howitzers. Also on top of the fort was a rotatable observation stand and an armored machine gun dome.

The basement consisted of:

- 2 supply rooms
- A standby room
- A rechargeable battery
- A generator room
- A workshop
- A fuel depot
- 1 staircase to the 1st floor

In the rear of the basement, a tunnel led to the infantry works “R” and “S”. There was also a postern, which replaced the front entrance after Italian shelling made it unusable during the war.

The 1st floor consisted of:

- The original entrance with a machine gun casemate covering the entrance,
- A casemate with 2 machine guns covering the surrounding trenches
- A kitchen
- An infirmary
- A doctor's office
- An emergency exit
- 2 standby rooms
- A commander's suite
- A telephone room
- A tomb for 6 coffins
- 1 staircase to the upper floor

The upper floor consisted of:

- An optical signal station for communicating with Fort Serrada
- 4 ammo magazines, 2 with lifts to the howitzers above
- 2 soldiers' quarters
- An officers' room
- A staircase
- An emergency exit

On the 2nd floor there was a continuous corridor with entrances to the howitzers and the observation dome.

== Infantry works ==
Complex “R” consisted of 2 adjacent bunkers "behind" Fort Sommo, named after their position (left or right) as seen from the fort. They are connected to each other and Sommo by a rock postern. The bunkers had the job of controlling the Val Orsana.

Complex “S”, just like Complex “R”, consists of 2 bunkers and is connected to the casemate block by a postern. The two bunkers are called "Front" and "Trench". Complex "S" had the job of guarding the Coe pass, as well as the access road.

== Armament ==
- 2 10 cm T.H M9 Howitzers mounted in the casemate block
- 3 armored domes with 2 machine guns each in the casemate block
- 1 rotating observation stand with a machine gun in the casemate block
- 2 armored domes with 1 dome having a machine gun, and 1 having 2 machine guns in Complex “R”’s right bunker
- 1 armored casemate with 2 machine guns in Complex “R”’s left bunker
- 2 armored domes, 1 with a machine gun, and 1 with 2 machine guns in Complex “S”’s front bunker
- 1 armored dome with 2 machine guns in Complex “S”’ trench bunker
- 2 21cm spotlights in R left
- 1 35cm spotlight in R right
- 1 21cm spotlight in complex S front

== Crew ==
The fort was supposed to be crewed by State Shooter Regiment No.I “Trento”, but since the unit was on the Eastern Front when the war broke out, an emergency crew was taken from State Shooter Regiment No. II "Bolzano". The wartime crew in May 1915 was 8 officers and 162 enlisted men. In preparation for the Battle of Asiago, 25 officers and 56 enlisted men were stationed at the fort.

== World War I ==
During WWI, Fort Sommo was not attacked by Italian infantry, and the shelling was light compared to that of Fort Lusern and Fort Verle. Starting in May 1915, 28 cm batteries fired 1400 shells at Sommo. The most intense shelling period was from August 25 to October 7, 1915. In this time, 712 shells landed on the fort's grounds, with only 49 shells hitting the buildings. Of these, 11 were on the armored domes, which the shells couldn't puncture. On August 30, 1915, a hole was punctured in the pre-armor of the rotating observation turret, although this was a dud. The shell then protruded from the pre-armor by 17 cm. The Italians posted a battery of 14.9 cm guns 4.5 mi away on Col Santo. These guns began shelling the surrounding trenches, as well as the access road. To combat this, a postern was drilled through the rock to a protected part of the road. When the Austro-Hungarian army collapsed at the end of 1918, Sommo continued firing to cover its retreat until its ammunition was exhausted.

== Post-war to today ==
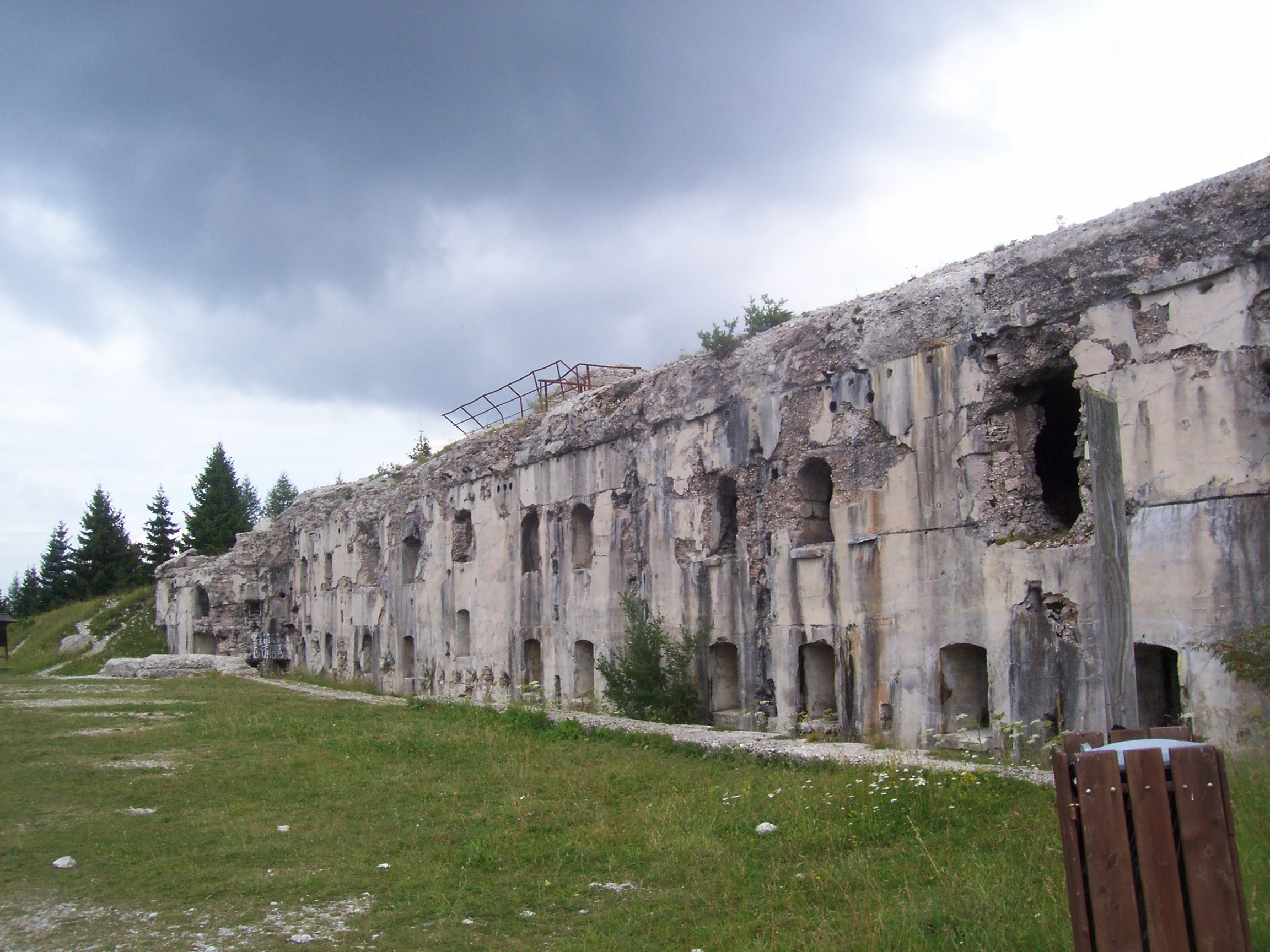
Forte Sommo as of 2009.

Because of the lack of heavy shelling, the fort is in good condition compared to Lusern and Verle. Although the fort was stripped for steel in the 1930s, explosives were used more sparingly than at other forts. The fort was decommissioned on August 12, 1927. Even after the war, the fort was still armed with its steel domes and guns. In 1961, the municipality of Folgaria purchased Sommo and began renovating it. A staircase has been installed, allowing visitors to reach the various levels.
