= Tomáš Suslov =

Slovak footballer (born 2002)

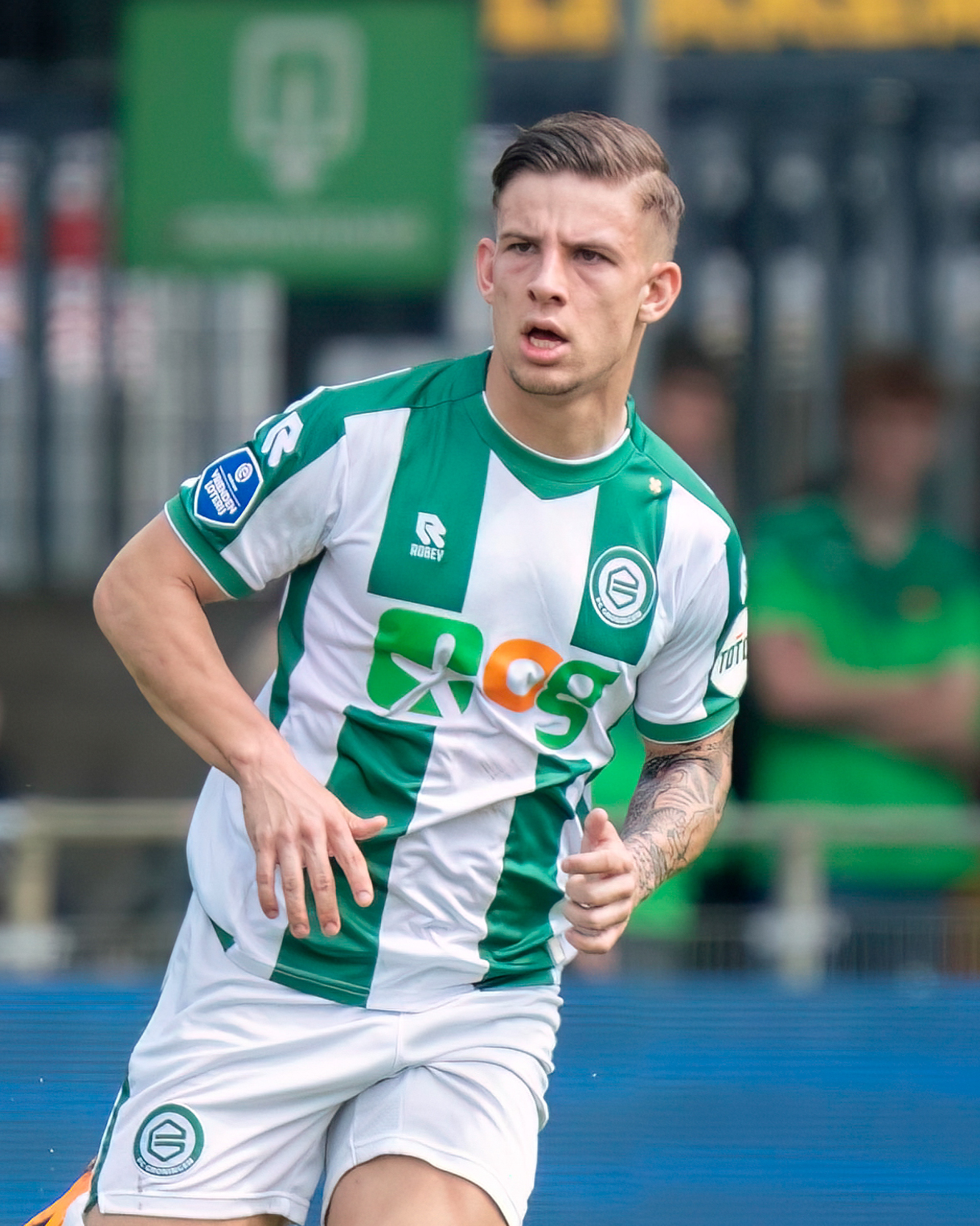
- Suslov with Groningen in 2023

Personal information
- Date of birth: 7 June 2002 (age 24)
- Place of birth: Spišská Nová Ves, Slovakia
- Height: 1.74 m (5 ft 9 in)
- Positions: Attacking midfielder; right winger

Team information
- Current team: Hellas Verona
- Number: 10

Youth career
- 2010–2013: Spišská Nová Ves
- 2014–2018: Tatran Prešov
- 2018–2020: Groningen

Senior career*
| Years | Team | Apps | (Gls) |
| 2020–2024 | Groningen | 90 | (5) |
| 2023–2024 | → Hellas Verona (loan) | 17 | (1) |
| 2024– | Hellas Verona | 60 | (2) |

International career^{‡}
| 2016 | Slovakia U15 | 1 | (0) |
| 2017–2018 | Slovakia U16 | 4 | (1) |
| 2018–2019 | Slovakia U17 | 8 | (2) |
| 2019–2020 | Slovakia U18 | 3 | (2) |
| 2019 | Slovakia U19 | 2 | (0) |
| 2020–2022 | Slovakia U21 | 4 | (1) |
| 2020– | Slovakia | 48 | (5) |
- * Club domestic league appearances and goals as of 20 September 2026 ‡ National team caps and goals as of 6 October 2026

Tomáš Suslov (born 7 June 2002) is a Slovak professional footballer who plays as an attacking midfielder or right winger for Serie B club Hellas Verona and the Slovakia national team.

== Club career ==
On 10 August 2018, Suslov joined Groningen on a two-year contract with an option for another season.

On 1 September 2023, Suslov joined Hellas Verona in Italy on loan with a conditional obligation to buy. On 31 January 2024, he signed permanently with a contract until June 2027.

== International career ==
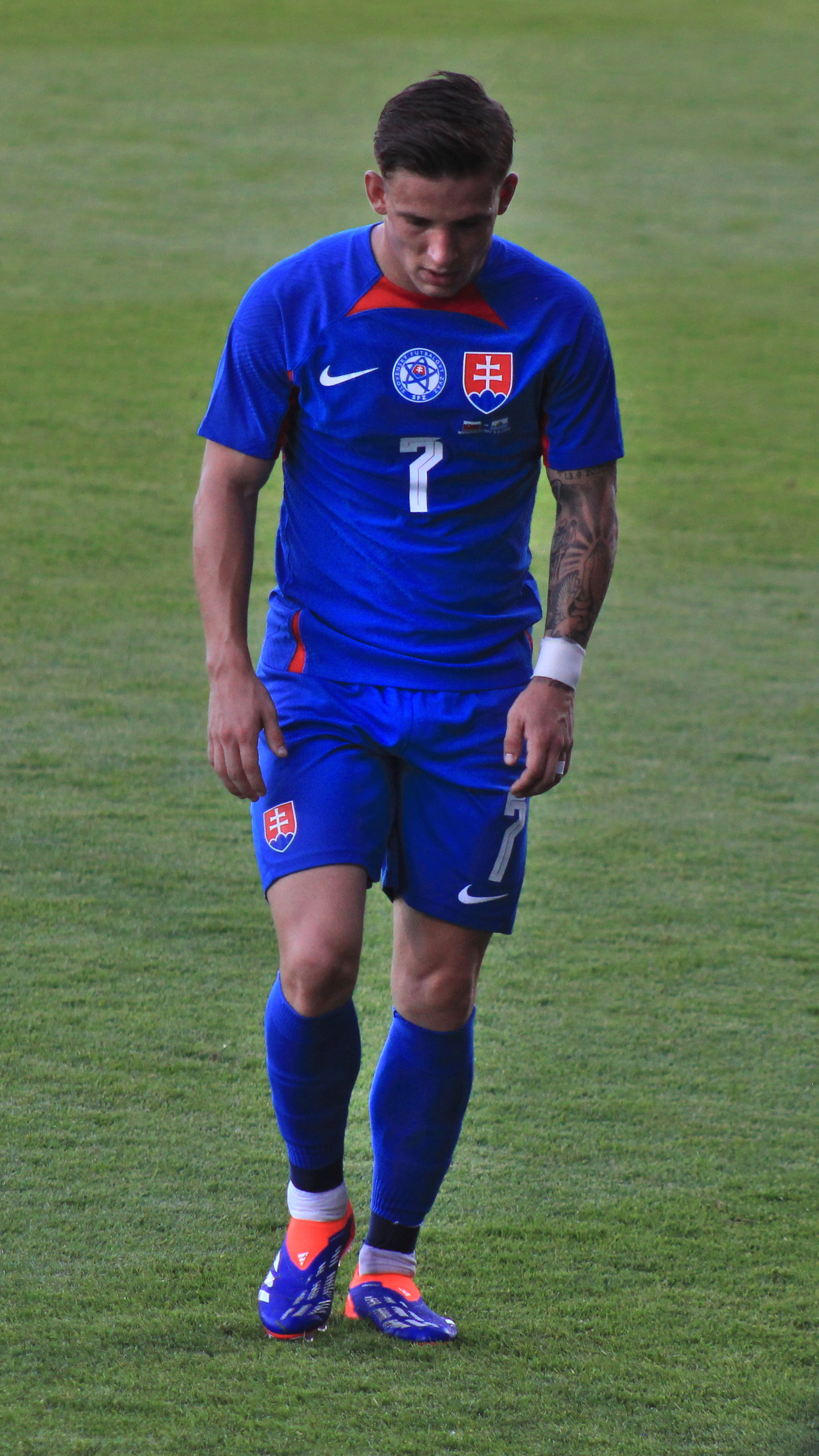
Suslov with Slovakia in 2024

Regarded as one of the finest players of his generation in Slovakia, Suslov has been regularly capped throughout all the categories of the national team. He debuted for the Slovak senior team on 18 November 2020 in a Nations League game against the Czech Republic, coming on as a substitute to Albert Rusnák in the 62nd minute and becoming the youngest Slovak footballer to debut at 18 years old. He was named in Slovakia's squad for UEFA Euro 2020, appearing as a substitute in the group matches against Poland and Spain.

Despite numerous performances where Suslov showed huge signs of promise and was close to getting his name on the scoresheet, it was in his 11th cap that he scored his first senior international goal in a Nations League game against Belarus in June 2022.

At UEFA Euro 2024, Suslov appeared as a substitute in all four of the team's matches as they reached the round of 16, losing to England after extra time.

== Personal life ==
During the 2022 Russian invasion of Ukraine, Suslov revealed his Ukrainian ancestry through his paternal side and his family got involved in humanitarian aid to affected Ukrainians.

== Career statistics ==
=== Club ===
As of match played 20 September 2026

Appearances and goals by club, season and competition
| Club | Season | League | | | National Cup | | Europe | | Other | | Total | |
| Club | Season | Division | Apps | Goals | Apps | Goals | Apps | Goals | Apps | Goals | Apps | Goals |
|---|---|---|---|---|---|---|---|---|---|---|---|---|
| Groningen | 2019–20 | Eredivisie | 1 | 0 | — | | — | | — | | 1 | 0 |
| Groningen | 2020–21 | Eredivisie | 28 | 2 | 1 | 0 | — | | 1 (Note: Appearance in Eredivisie European competition play-offs) | 0 | 30 | 2 |
| Groningen | 2021–22 | Eredivisie | 29 | 1 | 3 | 0 | — | | — | | 32 | 1 |
| Groningen | 2022–23 | Eredivisie | 30 | 1 | 1 | 0 | — | | — | | 31 | 1 |
| Groningen | 2023–24 | Eerste Divisie | 2 | 1 | — | | — | | — | | 2 | 1 |
| Groningen | Total | | 90 | 5 | 5 | 0 | — | | 1 | 0 | 96 | 5 |
| Hellas Verona (loan) | 2023–24 | Serie A | 32 | 3 | 1 | 0 | — | | — | | 33 | 3 |
| Hellas Verona | 2024–25 | Serie A | 31 | 0 | 1 | 0 | — | | — | | 32 | 0 |
| Hellas Verona | 2025–26 | Serie A | 11 | 0 | — | | — | | — | | 11 | 0 |
| Hellas Verona | 2026–27 | Serie A | 3 | 0 | 0 | 0 | — | | — | | 3 | 0 |
| Hellas Verona | Total | | 77 | 3 | 2 | 0 | — | | — | | 79 | 3 |
| Career total | | | 167 | 8 | 7 | 0 | 0 | 0 | 1 | 0 | 175 | 8 |

=== International ===
As of match played 6 October 2026

Appearances and goals by national team and year
| National team | Year | Apps | Goals |
|---|---|---|---|
| Slovakia | 2020 | 1 | 0 |
| Slovakia | 2021 | 8 | 0 |
| Slovakia | 2022 | 7 | 1 |
| Slovakia | 2023 | 9 | 1 |
| Slovakia | 2024 | 13 | 2 |
| Slovakia | 2025 | 2 | 0 |
| Slovakia | 2026 | 8 | 1 |
| Total | | 48 | 5 |

Scores and results list Slovakia's goal tally first.

List of international goals scored by Tomáš Suslov
| No. | Date | Venue | Cap | Opponent | Score | Result | Competition |
|---|---|---|---|---|---|---|---|
| 1. | 3 June 2022 | Karađorđe Stadium, Novi Sad, Serbia | 11 | Belarus | 1–0 | 1–0 | 2022–23 UEFA Nations League C |
| 2. | 17 June 2023 | Laugardalsvöllur, Reykjavík, Iceland | 19 | Iceland | 2–1 | 2–1 | UEFA Euro 2024 qualifying |
| 3. | 5 June 2024 | Wiener Neustadt Arena, Wiener Neustadt, Austria | 27 | San Marino | 2–0 | 4–0 | Friendly |
| 4. | 5 September 2024 | Lilleküla Stadium, Tallinn, Estonia | 33 | Estonia | 1–0 | 1–0 | 2024–25 UEFA Nations League C |
| 5. | 6 October 2026 | Zimbru Stadium, Chișinău, Moldova | 48 | Moldova | 2–0 | 4–0 | 2026–27 UEFA Nations League C |

== Honours ==
Individual

- Peter Dubovský Award: 2021, 2022
