= Allan Bohomo =

German footballer (born 2008)

Personal information
- Full name: Allan Mfigo Bohomo
- Date of birth: 20 March 2008 (age 18)
- Place of birth: Germany
- Height: 1.93 m (6 ft 4 in)
- Positions: Centre-back; right-back; defensive midfielder

Team information
- Current team: Hellas Verona U20
- Number: 4

Youth career
- –2020: Füchse Berlin Reinickendorf
- 2020–2025: RB Leipzig
- 2026: Bayern Munich
- 2026–: Hellas Verona

Senior career*
Years	Team	Apps	(Gls)
2026	Bayern Munich II	1	(0)
- * Club domestic league appearances and goals as of 10 April 2026

Allan Mfigo Bohomo (born 20 March 2008) is a German professional footballer who plays as a centre-back, right-back and defensive midfielder for the under-20 team (Campionato Primavera 1) of Serie B club Hellas Verona.

== Club career ==
Bohomo is a youth product of Füchse Berlin Reinickendorf, later joining the youth academy of RB Leipzig in 2020. He left RB Leipzig in 2025, and joined the youth academy of Bundesliga giants Bayern Munich in 2026 as a free agent.

Bohomo received his first call-up with Bayern Munich II during the 2025–26 season on 1 April 2026, in a 1–0 away loss Regionalliga Bayern match against SV Wacker Burghausen, but did not play. Nine days later, he made his professional debut, substituting Maximilian Schuhbauer late in the second half of a 2–1 away loss Regionalliga Bayern match against Würzburger Kickers, on 10 April. Seven days later, Bohomo was called up with Bayern Munich II once again, as an unused substitute during a 2–1 home loss Regionalliga Bayern match against SpVgg Ansbach, on April 17. Four days later, he received his fourth call-up with Bayern Munich II during the 2025–26 season, but did not play during the 4–1 away loss Regionalliga Bayern match against 1. FC Nürnberg II, on 21 April.

On 27 July 2026, Bohomo joined Italian Serie B club Hellas Verona as a free agent, signing a contract until 2028, he was immediately assigned to the club's under-20 team (Primavera) in the Campionato Primavera 1, ahead of the 2026–27 season.

== Personal life ==
Born in Germany, Bohomo of Cameroonian descent, and holds dual citizenship, he is the older brother of fellow footballer Bastian Assomo, who also progressed through the FC Bayern Campus.

== Career statistics ==
As of match played 10 April 2026

Appearances and goals by club, season and competition
Club	Season	League			Cup		Total	
Club	Season	Division	Apps	Goals	Apps	Goals	Apps	Goals
Bayern Munich II	2025–26	Regionalliga Bayern	1	0	—		1	0
Bayern Munich II	Total		1	0	—		1	0
Career Total			1	0	0	0	1	0
