= Giardino Botanico Alpino di Passo Coe =

Italian nature preserve

Coordinates: 45°55′N 11°11′E

The Giardino Botanico Alpino di Passo Coe is a municipal nature preserve and alpine botanical garden located at an elevation of 1612 meters on Monte Marònia in Passo Coe, about 5 km southeast of Folgaria, Trentino, Italy. It is managed by the Museo Civico Rovereto, and open Tuesdays through Sundays in the warmer months.

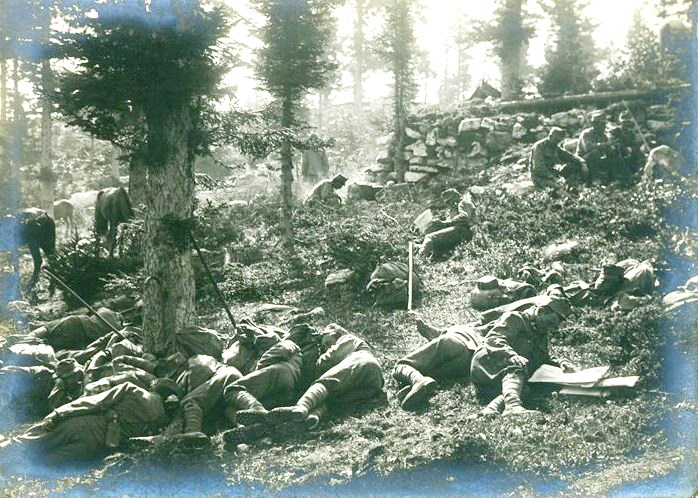
Austrian soldiers during WWI resting in the woods beneath Monte Maronia

The garden contains alpine plants and flowers, in an alpine landscape of pasture, pond, and trees. It also includes collections useful plants and medicinal plants.

== See also ==
- List of botanical gardens in Italy
