= Al-Musrati =

Libyan footballer (born 1996)

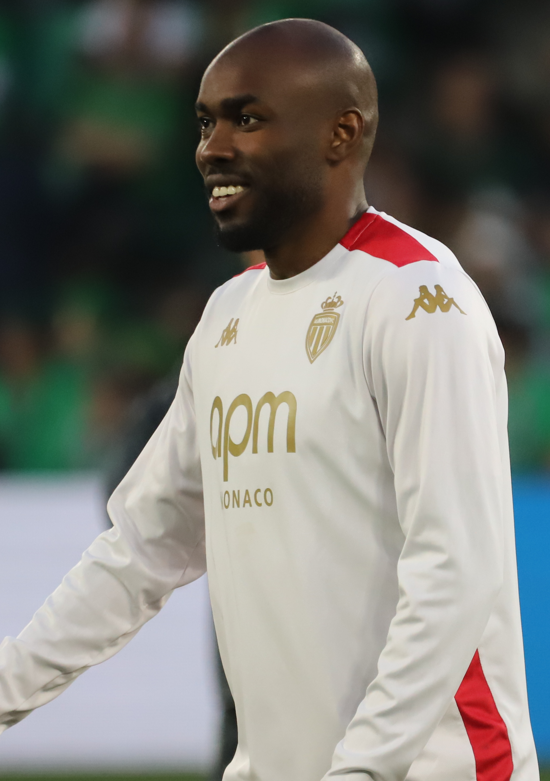
- Al-Musrati with Monaco in 2025

Personal information
- Full name: Al-Mu'attasim Billah Ali Mohamed Al-Musrati
- Date of birth: 6 April 1996 (age 30)
- Place of birth: Misrata, Libya
- Height: 1.89 m (6 ft 2 in)
- Position: Defensive midfielder

Team information
- Current team: Al Ahli
- Number: 8

Senior career*
Years	Team	Apps	(Gls)
2013–2017	Al-Ittihad Tripoli		
2017–2019	Vitória de Guimarães B	40	(1)
2019–2020	Vitória de Guimarães	5	(0)
2020	→ Rio Ave (loan)	12	(0)
2020–2024	Braga	97	(10)
2024	→ Beşiktaş (loan)	9	(0)
2024–2026	Beşiktaş	16	(1)
2025	→ Monaco (loan)	10	(1)
2025–2026	→ Hellas Verona (loan)	18	(0)
2026–	Al Ahli	0	(0)

International career
2014–	Libya	44	(3)
Medal record
Representing Libya
Men's football
African Nations Championship
Winner	2014 South Africa
- * Club domestic league appearances and goals as of 17 November 2026

Al-Mu'attasim Billah Ali Mohamed Al-Musrati (Arabic: الْمُعْتَصِم بِالله عَلِيّ مُحَمَّد الْمِصْرَاتِيّ; born 6 April 1996), known simply as Al-Musrati, is a Libyan professional footballer who plays as a defensive midfielder for Al Ahli.

== Club career ==
=== Vitória de Guimarães ===
==== Reserve team ====
In January 2017, Al-Musrati signed a three-and-a-half-year deal with Portuguese side Vitória de Guimarães on the recommendation of former player Romano Sion. He began playing for their reserve team in LigaPro, and on 4 March 2018 scored his first goal to equalise in a 1–1 draw away to União.

==== First team ====
On 5 August 2019, Al-Musrati made his debut for the first team, playing the full 90 minutes of a 1–0 win at Feirense in the second round of the Taça da Liga. Thirteen days later he made his Primeira Liga debut in a 1–1 home draw with Boavista and was third-place in the vote for the league's best midfielder of the month, behind Bruno Fernandes and Pizzi. On 12 December, he scored his only goal for the first team, equalising in a 3–2 comeback win at Eintracht Frankfurt in the group stage of the UEFA Europa League; his club was already eliminated.

==== Loan to Rio Ave ====
Al-Musrati was loaned to Rio Ave of the same league on 29 January 2020, for the rest of the season. He, Diogo Figueiras and Nuno Santos were sent off on 17 June in a 2–1 home loss to Benfica.

=== Braga ===
On 31 July 2020, Al-Musrati signed a four-year deal at Braga, joining his former Rio Ave manager Carlos Carvalhal. His first goal was on 26 November, to open a 3–3 home draw with Leicester City in the Europa League group stage; three days later he struck for the first time in the top flight to win at the Estádio Municipal de Braga against Farense. He was voted the league's Player of the Month for February 2021.

On 15 August 2023, he scored a goal in a 4–1 away victory over TSC during the 2023–24 Champions League third qualifying round, to be the first Libyan to score in UEFA Champions League. A month later, on 20 September, he made his Champions League group stage debut in a 2–1 defeat against Napoli, to be the second Libyan to achieve this feat. (Note: the first being Djamal Mahamat in 2012 also with Braga)

=== Beşiktaş ===
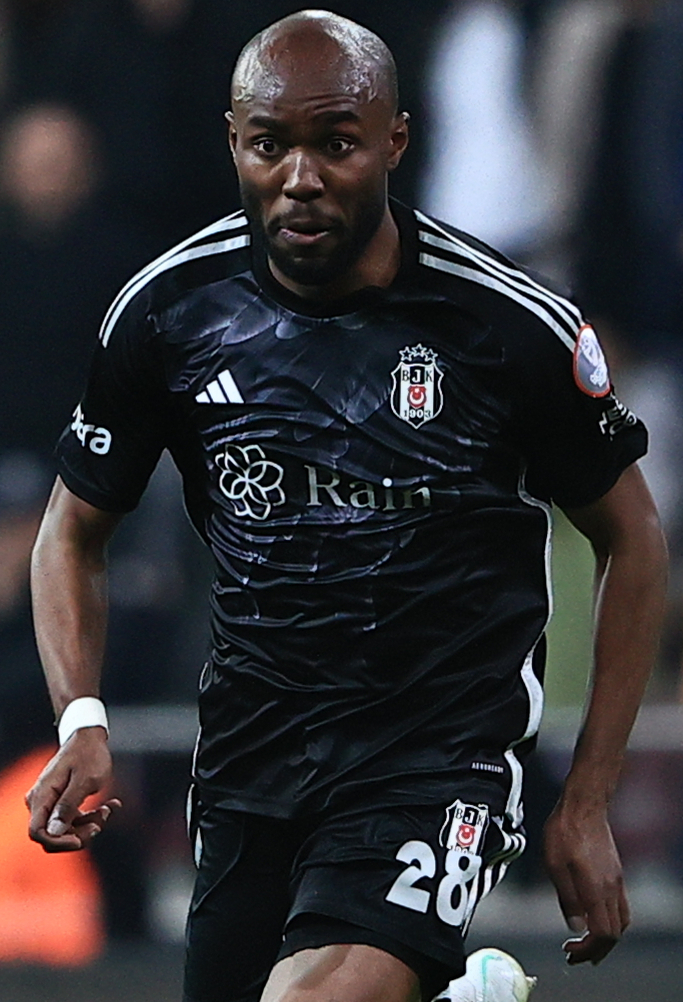
Al-Musrati playing for Beşiktaş in 2024

On 9 February 2024, Al-Musrati joined Süper Lig club Beşiktaş on loan from Braga until the end of the 2023–24 season, in exchange for a €1 million loan fee, with a subsequent mandatory buy-clause of €11 million (conditional on performance), which could rise to €13.5 million with add-ons.

On 13 February 2024, the club officially announced that they used mandatory buy-clause of €11 million and Al-Musrati completed a permanent transfer to Beşiktaş. Al-Musrati thus became the most expensive transfer in Beşiktaş history. Later that year, on 23 May, he scored his first goal for the club in the fourth minute of stoppage time in the Turkish Cup final, securing the winning goal in a 3–2 victory over Trabzonspor.

==== Loan to Monaco ====
On 3 February 2025, Monaco announced the transfer of Al-Musrati on loan from Beşiktaş until the end of the season, with a purchase option. On 7 February 2025, he played his first game with the club, a 1–4 Ligue 1 defeat against Paris Saint-Germain, becoming the first Libyan to play in Ligue 1.

On 3 May 2025, he scored Monaco's second goal in a 3–1 win against Saint-Étienne, becoming the first ever Libyan to score in Ligue 1. However, he was severely injured during the game, and it was his last appearance for Monaco.

On 19 May 2025, Monaco announced that they would not purchase Al-Musrati, and that he would return to Beşiktaş.

Upon his return from loan, Al-Musrati's contract with Beşiktaş was mutually terminated on 30 August 2026.

==== Loan to Hellas Verona ====
On 29 August 2025, Serie A club Hellas Verona announced that they had signed Al-Musrati on a season-long loan with an option to buy.

Two days later, on 31 August 2025, he played his first game with Hellas Verona, a 0–4 defeat against Lazio in Serie A.

== International career ==
Al-Musrati was first called up for Libya at the 2014 African Nations Championship in South Africa, and played all but one game including the penalty shootout win over Ghana in the final.

On 8 October 2024, Al-Musrati announced his retirement from international football, citing personal reasons.

== Career statistics ==
=== Club ===
As of match played 24 May 2026

Appearances and goals by club, season and competition
Club	Season	League			National cup (Note: Includes Taça de Portugal, Turkish Cup)		League cup (Note: Includes Taça da Liga)		Continental		Other		Total	
Club	Season	Division	Apps	Goals	Apps	Goals	Apps	Goals	Apps	Goals	Apps	Goals	Apps	Goals
Vitória de Guimarães B	2016–17	Liga Portugal 2	3	0	—		—		—		—		3	0
Vitória de Guimarães B	2017–18	Liga Portugal 2	10	1	—		—		—		—		10	1
Vitória de Guimarães B	2018–19	Liga Portugal 2	27	0	—		—		—		—		27	0
Vitória de Guimarães B	Total		40	1	—		—		—		—		40	1
Vitória de Guimarães	2019–20	Primeira Liga	5	0	1	0	—		7 (Note: Appearances in UEFA Europa League)	1	—		13	1
Rio Ave (loan)	2019–20	Primeira Liga	12	0	—		—		—		—		12	0
Braga	2020–21	Primeira Liga	28	3	6	0	3	0	7	1	—		44	4
Braga	2021–22	Primeira Liga	30	1	2	0	2	0	11	1	1 (Note: Appearance in Supertaça Cândido de Oliveira)	0	46	2
Braga	2022–23	Primeira Liga	28	3	4	1	3	1	6 (Note: Five appearances in UEFA Europa League, one appearance in UEFA Europa Conference League)	0	—		41	5
Braga	2023–24	Primeira Liga	11	3	0	0	1	0	8 (Note: Appearance(s) in UEFA Champions League)	1	—		19	4
Braga	Total		97	10	12	1	9	1	32	3	1	0	151	15
Beşiktaş (loan)	2023–24	Süper Lig	9	0	4	1	—		—		—		13	1
Beşiktaş	2024–25	Süper Lig	16	1	0	0	—		8	1	1 (Note: Appearance in Turkish Super Cup)	0	25	2
Beşiktaş	Total		25	1	4	1	—		8	1	1	0	38	3
AS Monaco (loan)	2024–25	Ligue 1	10	1	—		—		1	0	—		11	1
Hellas Verona (loan)	2025–26	Serie A	18	0	1	0	—		—		—		19	0
Career total			205	13	18	2	9	1	46	5	2	0	282	21

=== International ===
As of match played 23 March 2023

Appearances and goals by national team and year
National team	Year	Apps	Goals
Libya	2014	6	0
Libya	2015	9	1
Libya	2016	7	0
Libya	2017	6	1
Libya	2018	3	0
Libya	2019	4	0
Libya	2020	2	0
Libya	2021	3	0
Libya	2023	2	0
Total		42	2

International goals

Scores and results list Libya's goal tally first, score column indicates score after each Elmusrati goal.

List of international goals scored by Ali Elmusrati
No.	Date	Venue	Opponent	Score	Result	Competition
1	6 September 2015	Petro Sport Stadium, New Cairo, Egypt	Cape Verde	1–1	1–2	2017 Africa Cup of Nations qualification
2	7 October 2017	Stade Mustapha Ben Jannet, Monastir, Tunisia	DR Congo	1–1	1–2	2018 FIFA World Cup qualification
3	31 March 2026	Larbi Zaouli Stadium, Casablanca, Morocco	Liberia	2–0	2–2	Friendly

== Honours ==
Braga

- Taça de Portugal: 2020–21
- Taça da Liga: 2023–24

Beşiktaş

- Turkish Cup: 2023–24
- Turkish Super Cup: 2024

Libya

- African Nations Championship: 2014

Individual

- Primeira Liga Player of the Month: February 2021
- Primeira Liga Midfielder of the Month: February 2021
