= Rafik Belghali =

Algerian footballer (born 2002)

Personal information
- Date of birth: 7 June 2002 (age 24)
- Place of birth: Leuven, Belgium
- Height: 1.80 m (5 ft 11 in)
- Position: Right-back

Team information
- Current team: Torino
- Number: 45

Youth career
- 2009–2010: Sint-Truiden
- 2010–2011: PSV
- 2011–2013: Lierse
- 2013–2018: Zulte Waregem
- 2019–2020: Lommel

Senior career*
Years	Team	Apps	(Gls)
2020–2023	Lommel	44	(7)
2023–2025	Mechelen	48	(3)
2025–2026	Hellas Verona	26	(2)
2026–	Torino	6	(1)

International career^{‡}
2022–2025	Algeria U23	3	(0)
2025–	Algeria	17	(2)
- * Club domestic league appearances and goals as of 21:25, 23 October 2026 (UTC) ‡ National team caps and goals as of 05:26, 3 July 2026 (UTC)

Rafik Belghali (born 7 June 2002) is a professional footballer who plays as a right-back for Serie A side Torino. Born in Belgium, he represents the Algeria national team.

== Club career ==
Belghali made his senior debut for Lommel during the 2021–22 season after progressing through the club's youth system. In mid-2022–23 season, he suffered a knee injury that ruled him out for the remainder of the campaign. On 28 June 2023, Belghali signed a three-season contract with Mechelen.

On 19 August 2025, Belghali moved to Hellas Verona in Italy, signing a four-year contract. He scored his first Serie A goal, opening the score in a 2–1 away defeat against Genoa on 29 November 2025.

On 1 September 2026, Belghali joined fellow Serie A side Torino.

== International career ==
In March 2022, Belghali was called up by Noureddine Ould Ali to the Algeria under-23 national team for the first time for a pair of friendlies against Mauritania.

In his maiden call up to the Algerian national team, Belghali started in a friendly against Zimbabwe on 13 November 2025.

On 31 May 2026, Belghali was named in Vladimir Petković's 26-man Algeria squad for the 2026 FIFA World Cup. A month later, on 27 June, he scored his first World Cup goal in a 3–3 draw with Austria.

== Personal life ==
Belghali was born in Belgium to Algerian parents.

== Career statistics ==
=== Club ===
As of match played 23 October 2026

Appearances and goals by club, season and competition
Club	Season	League			National cup (Note: Includes Belgian Cup, Copa del Rey)		Europe		Other		Total	
Club	Season	Division	Apps	Goals	Apps	Goals	Apps	Goals	Apps	Goals	Apps	Goals
Lommel	2020–21	Challenger Pro League	3	0	—		—		—		3	0
Lommel	2021–22	Challenger Pro League	24	1	3	0	—		—		27	1
Lommel	2022–23	Challenger Pro League	17	6	1	0	—		—		18	6
Lommel	Total		44	7	4	0	—		—		48	7
Mechelen	2023–24	Belgian Pro League	9	2	—		—		—		9	2
Mechelen	2024–25	Belgian Pro League	36	1	2	0	—		—		38	1
Mechelen	2025–26	Belgian Pro League	3	0	0	0	—		—		3	0
Mechelen	Total		48	3	2	0	—		—		50	3
Hellas Verona	2025–26	Serie A	26	2	0	0	—		—		26	2
Torino	2026–27	Serie A	6	1	0	0	—		—		6	1
Career total			124	13	6	0	0	0	0	0	130	13

=== International ===
As of match played 2 July 2026

Appearances and goals by national team and year
National team	Year	Apps	Goals
Algeria	2025	7	1
Algeria	2026	10	1
Total		17	2

Algeria score listed first, score column indicates score after each Belghali goal.

List of international goals scored by Rafik Belghali
No.	Date	Venue	Opponent	Score	Result	Competition
1	18 November 2025	Prince Abdullah Al-Faisal Sports City Stadium, Jeddah, Saudi Arabia	Saudi Arabia	2–0	2–0	Friendly
2	27 June 2026	Arrowhead Stadium, Kansas City, United States	Austria	1–1	3–3	2026 FIFA World Cup
