= Dailon Livramento =

Cape Verdean footballer (born 2001)

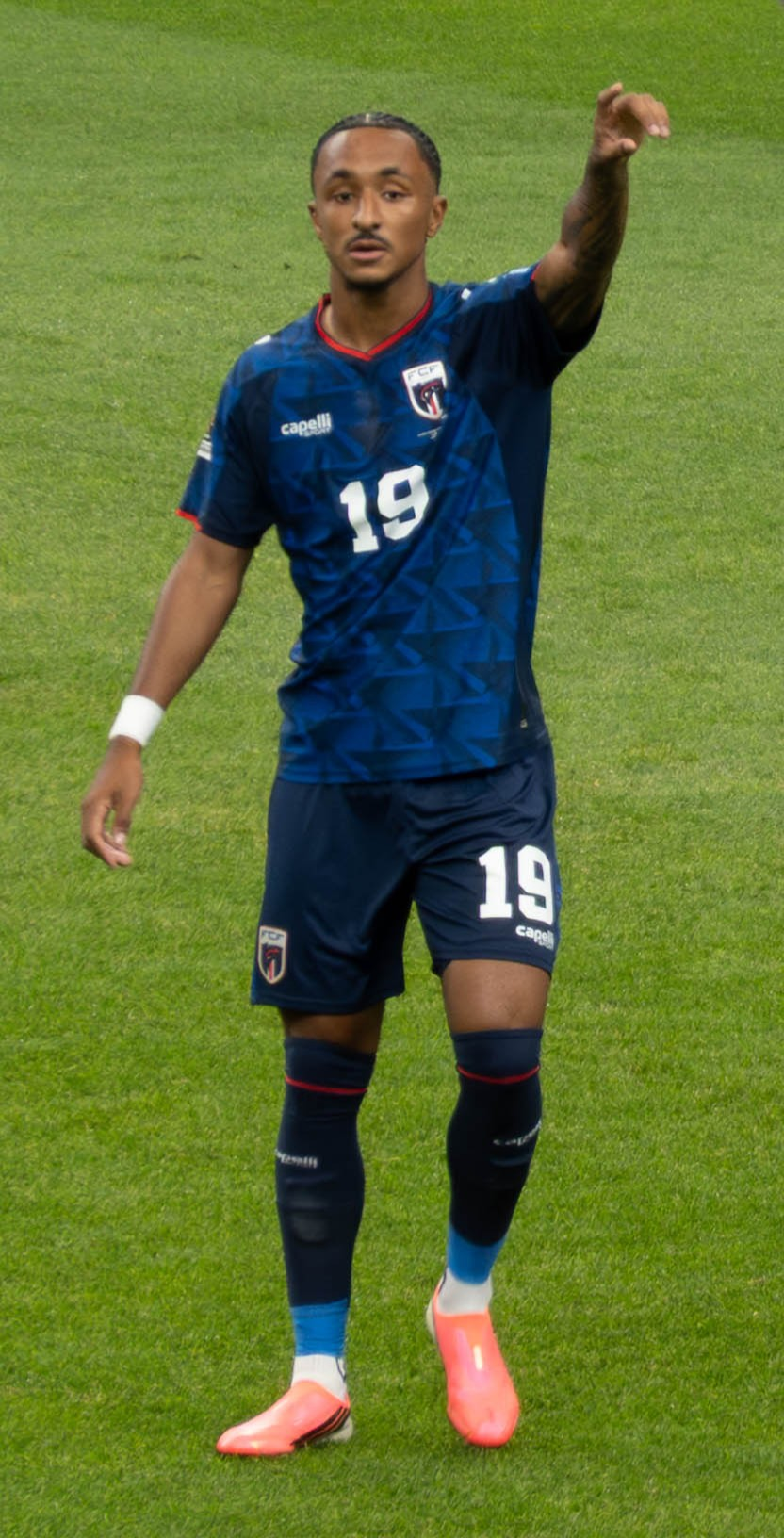
- Livramento with Cape Verde at the 2026 FIFA World Cup

Personal information
- Full name: Dailon Rocha Livramento do Rosario
- Date of birth: 4 May 2001 (age 25)
- Place of birth: Rotterdam, Netherlands
- Height: 1.85 m (6 ft 1 in)
- Position: Forward

Team information
- Current team: Hellas Verona

Youth career
- Excelsior
- Sparta AV
- –2019: Excelsior Maassluis
- 2019–2021: NAC Breda

Senior career*
Years	Team	Apps	(Gls)
2021–2022	Roda JC	1	(0)
2022–2024	MVV	63	(20)
2024–	Hellas Verona	34	(1)
2025–2026	→ Casa Pia (loan)	24	(0)

International career^{‡}
2024–	Cape Verde	27	(8)
- * Club domestic league appearances and goals as of 20 September 2026 ‡ National team caps and goals as of 14 November 2026

Dailon Rocha Livramento do Rosario (Portuguese: [ˈdaj.lɔn ˈʀɔ.ʃɐ li.vɾɐ.ˈmẽ.tu du ʀu.ˈza.ɾi.u]; born 4 May 2001) is a professional footballer who plays as a forward for Serie B club Hellas Verona. Born in the Netherlands, he plays for the Cape Verde national team.

== Club career ==
=== Roda JC ===
Livramento was born in Rotterdam, and played youth football for Excelsior, Sparta AV, Excelsior Maassluis, and NAC Breda. In 2021, he moved to Roda JC Kerkrade, where he initially joined the under-21 team. He made his professional debut for the first team on 26 October 2021, starting in a 2–1 win over FC Den Bosch in the KNVB Cup in which he contributed with his first goal.

=== MVV ===
On 3 August 2022, Livramento signed a two-year contract with an option for an additional year with Eerste Divisie club MVV. He made his debut for the club on the first matchday of the 2022–23 season, replacing Thomas van Bommel in the 74th minute of a 3–1 loss to Jong AZ. On 19 August, he scored his first professional goal as well as his first goal for the club, bagging the last goal of a 3–1 home win over ADO Den Haag.

Livramento established himself as a starter for MVV in the second half of the 2023–24 season and proved to be a productive goalscorer. He finished the season with 16 goals in 36 appearances, as MVV finished ninth, narrowly missing out on promotion play-offs by goal difference.

=== Hellas Verona ===
On 24 July 2024, Livramento signed a four-year contract with Serie A club Hellas Verona. He made his debut for the club on 10 August, coming on as a substitute for Abdou Harroui in the 55th minute of a disappointing 2–1 Coppa Italia loss to Cesena. On 18 August, he was included in manager Paolo Zanetti's starting lineup for the first matchday of the 2024–25 Serie A, where he scored Verona's opening goal of the campaign in a 3–0 victory against Napoli.

On 1 September 2025, Livramento was loaned to Casa Pia in Portugal.

== International career ==
In March 2024, Livramento was called up to the Cape Verde national team.

On 18 May 2026, he was called up by Cape Verde's head coach Bubista for the 2026 FIFA World Cup.

== Career statistics ==
=== Club ===
As of match played 13 November 2026

Appearances and goals by club, season and competition
Club	Season	League			National cup		Other		Total	
Club	Season	Division	Apps	Goals	Apps	Goals	Apps	Goals	Apps	Goals
Roda JC	2021–22	Eerste Divisie	1	0	2	1	0	0	3	1
MVV	2022–23	Eerste Divisie	28	4	0	0	2 (Note: Appearances in Eredivisie promotion/relegation playoffs)	1	30	5
MVV	2023–24	Eerste Divisie	35	16	1	0	—		36	16
MVV	Total		63	20	1	0	2	1	65	21
Hellas Verona	2024–25	Serie A	29	1	1	0	—		30	1
Hellas Verona	2026–27	Serie B	5	0	2	0	—		7	0
Hellas Verona	Total		34	1	3	0	—		37	1
Casa Pia (loan)	2025–26	Primeira Liga	24	0	2	0	2 (Note: Appearances in relegation play-offs)	0	28	0
Career total			122	21	8	1	4	1	134	23

=== International ===
As of match played 13 November 2026

Appearances and goals by national team and year
National team	Year	Apps	Goals
Cape Verde
Cape Verde	2024	10	0
Cape Verde	2025	9	6
Cape Verde	2026	8	2
Total		27	8

Scores and results list Cape Verde's goal tally first.

List of international goals scored by Dailon Livramento
No.	Date	Venue	Opponent	Score	Result	Competition
1.	25 March 2025	11 November Stadium, Luanda, Angola	Angola	1–0	2–1	2026 FIFA World Cup qualification
2.	25 March 2025	11 November Stadium, Luanda, Angola	Angola	2–1	2–1	2026 FIFA World Cup qualification
3.	3 June 2025	Bukit Jalil National Stadium, Kuala Lumpur, Malaysia	Malaysia	1–0	3–0	Friendly
4.	3 June 2025	Bukit Jalil National Stadium, Kuala Lumpur, Malaysia	Malaysia	2–0	3–0	Friendly
5.	9 September 2025	Estádio Nacional de Cabo Verde, Praia, Cape Verde	Cameroon	1–0	1–0	2026 FIFA World Cup qualification
6.	13 October 2025	Estádio Nacional de Cabo Verde, Praia, Cape Verde	Eswatini	1–0	3–0	2026 FIFA World Cup qualification
7.	27 March 2026	Eden Park, Auckland, New Zealand	Chile	1–1	2–4	2026 FIFA Series
8.	13 November 2026	Estádio Nacional de Cabo Verde, Praia, Cape Verde	Liberia	3–1	4–2	2027 Africa Cup of Nations qualification

== Personal life ==
Livramento's brother Jerzy, aka Jerr, is a rapper in Dutch hip-hop group Broederliefde. . Livramento is the son of renowned Cape Verdean singer Marizia do Rosário, often known simply as Marizia. He comes from a family with deep musical roots:

- Mother: Marizia do Rosário, a celebrated Cape Verdean singer.
- Father: Was a DJ.
- Brother: Jerzy Livramento (“Jerr”), a member of the Dutch hip-hop group Broederliefde.
