= Martin Frese =

Danish footballer (born 1998)

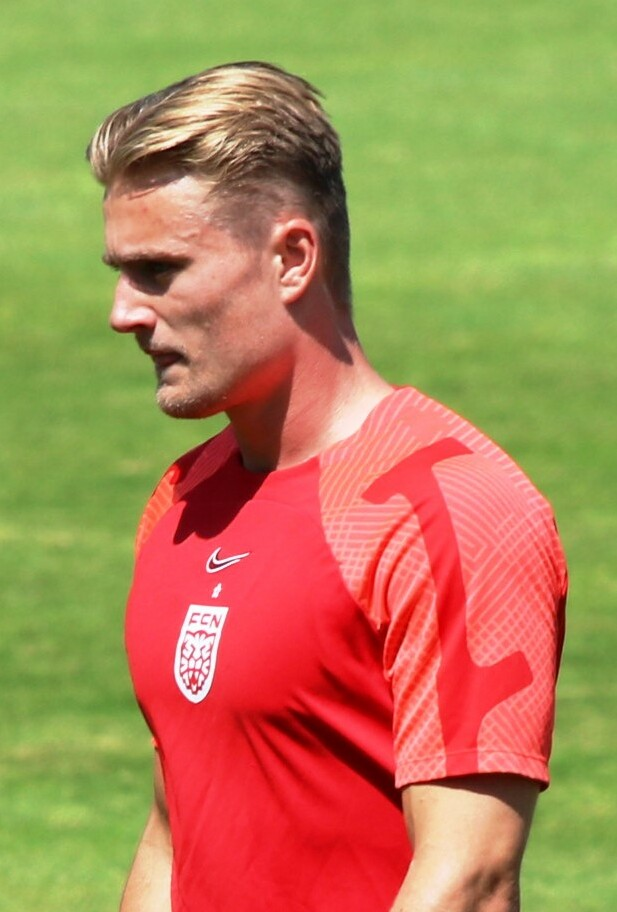
- Frese with Nordsjælland in 2023

Personal information
- Date of birth: 4 January 1998 (age 28)
- Place of birth: Rødovre, Denmark
- Height: 1.79 m (5 ft 10 in)
- Positions: Defender; wing-back

Team information
- Current team: Hellas Verona
- Number: 3

Youth career
- Orient fodbold
- BK Frem
- Nordsjælland

Senior career*
Years	Team	Apps	(Gls)
2017–2024	Nordsjælland	110	(10)
2024–	Hellas Verona	42	(2)
- * Club domestic league appearances and goals as of 25 May 2026

Martin Frese (born 4 January 1998) is a Danish professional footballer who plays as a defender or a wing-back for Serie B club Hellas Verona.

== Club career ==
=== Early years ===
Frese started his career at local club Orient Fodbold before heading to BK Frem, but joined FC Nordsjælland at the age of 15.

=== Nordsjælland ===
Frese got his first senior call up on 31 March 2017, where he sat on the bench for the whole game against Lyngby Boldklub.

He got his debut for FC Nordsjælland on 5 May 2017. Frese was in the starting lineup, but got replaced by Patrick da Silva after only 35 minutes due to an injury in a 1–1 draw against F.C. Copenhagen in the Danish Superliga. Frese suffered an anterior cruciate ligament injury and was expected a break for 12 months. However, his contract got extended and he was promoted to the first team squad for the 2017/18 season. Frese got his contract extended in July 2018 until 2021. After four games in the 2018/19 season, Frese got injured in February 2019 and was out for the rest of the season.

From the 2020–21 season, Frese was used as a left-back for Nordsjælland. After a good individual season for Frese, he signed a contract extension on 16 July 2021, signing until June 2022. Frese was also handed shirt number 5.

On 19 May 2024, FC Nordsjælland announced that Frese would leave the club at the end of the season.

=== Hellas Verona ===
On 10 July 2024, he signed for Serie A club Hellas Verona on a four-year deal. On August 18, 2024, Frese made his official debut for Verona in the 3–0 win over Napoli, where Frese was in the starting lineup. On 7 January 2026, he scored his first goal for the club in a 2–2 away draw with Napoli.

== Career statistics ==
=== Club ===
As of match played 8 March 2026

Appearances and goals by club, season and competition
Club	Season	League			Cup		Europe		Other		Total	
Club	Season	Division	Apps	Goals	Apps	Goals	Apps	Goals	Apps	Goals	Apps	Goals
Nordsjælland	2016–17	Danish Superliga	1	0	—		—		—		1	0
Nordsjælland	2018–19	Danish Superliga	2	0	1	0	1 (Note: Appearances in UEFA Europa League)	0	—		4	0
Nordsjælland	2019–20	Danish Superliga	7	0	0	0	—		—		7	0
Nordsjælland	2020–21	Danish Superliga	15	3	0	0	—		—		15	3
Nordsjælland	2021–22	Danish Superliga	30	1	2	0	—		—		32	1
Nordsjælland	2022–23	Danish Superliga	26	2	2	1	—		—		28	3
Nordsjælland	2023–24	Danish Superliga	29	4	5	1	10 (Note: Appearances in UEFA Conference League)	1	—		44	6
Nordsjælland	Total		110	10	10	2	11	1	0	0	131	13
Hellas Verona	2024–25	Serie A	11	0	0	0	—		—		11	0
Hellas Verona	2025–26	Serie A	22	2	1	0	—		—		23	2
Hellas Verona	Total		33	2	1	0	0	0	0	0	34	2
Career total			143	12	11	2	11	1	0	0	165	15

== Honours ==
Individual

- Danish Superliga Team of the Month: August 2023, March 2024
