= Salvatore Cerbone =

Italian footballer (born 2007)

Personal information
- Date of birth: 22 October 2007 (age 19)
- Place of birth: Naples, Italy
- Height: 1.83 m (6 ft 0 in)
- Position: Forward

Team information
- Current team: Hellas Verona
- Number: 35

Youth career
- 2023–2025: Ascoli

Senior career*
Years	Team	Apps	(Gls)
2025–2026	Casarano	23	(1)
2026–	Hellas Verona	5	(2)
- * Club domestic league appearances and goals as of 20 September 2026

Salvatore Cerbone (born 22 October 2007) is an Italian professional footballer who plays as a forward for Serie B club Hellas Verona.

== Club career ==
Born in Naples, Cerbone first played football for amateur teams in his hometown before spending six months in Perugia, after which he joined Ascoli's Primavera team.

In June 2026, he signed his first professional contract with Casarano. Cerbone made his professional debut with the club in a 1–0 Coppa Serie C win over Altamura on 17 August 2025, before making his league debut the following month, soon showing his attacking prowess with the Apulian club.

By the end of the season, Cerbone had become a central player for the team from Casarano, scoring two goals in the Serie C promotion play-offs.

On the summer 2026, he was transferred to Hellas Verona that had just been relegated from Serie A. Soon making his debut with the second tier club, Cerbone scored his first goals on 6 September 2026, with a brace against Arezzo during a 5–0 home league win.
