= Mattia Compagnon =

Italian footballer (born 2001)

Personal information
- Date of birth: 6 November 2001 (age 25)
- Place of birth: Udine, Italy
- Height: 1.71 m (5 ft 7 in)
- Position: Winger

Team information
- Current team: Hellas Verona (on loan from Venezia)
- Number: 11

Youth career
- Aurora Buonacquisto
- Moimacco
- 2013–2019: Udinese

Senior career*
Years	Team	Apps	(Gls)
2019–2021	Udinese	0	(0)
2020–2021	→ Potenza (loan)	12	(1)
2021	→ Juventus U23 (loan)	12	(2)
2021–2026	Juventus	0	(0)
2021–2023	→ Juventus Next Gen (Note: The team's name was changed from Juventus U23 to Juventus Next Gen in August 2022.) (res.)	49	(11)
2023–2024	→ Feralpisalò (loan)	29	(5)
2024–2025	→ Catanzaro (loan)	22	(2)
2025–2026	→ Venezia (loan)	18	(2)
2026–	Venezia	0	(0)
2026–	→ Hellas Verona (loan)	3	(0)
- * Club domestic league appearances and goals as of 11 September 2026

Mattia Compagnon (born 6 November 2001) is an Italian professional footballer who plays as a winger for Serie B club Hellas Verona, on loan from Venezia.

== Career ==
=== Early career ===
Compagnon started his career at Aurora Buonacquisto, his hometown team, before moving to Moimacco, where he remained for four years.

Compagnon joined Udinese's youth setup aged 11. In 2018–19, Compagnon scored five goals in the Campionato Primavera 1; the following season, he scored eight in 18 games in the Campionato Primavera 2. Compagnon was first called up to the first team on 19 July 2020, in a Serie A game against Napoli. He made five bench appearances in 2019–20, without featuring for Udinese.

==== Loan to Potenza ====
On 11 September 2020, Compagnon joined Serie C side Potenza on loan. He made his debut on 23 September, coming on as a substitute in a 2–0 Coppa Italia defeat to Triestina. Compagnon's league debut came on 24 October; he was subbed on in the 79th minute in a 2–1 defeat to Virtus Francavilla.

On 18 November, Compagnon played his first game as a starter in a 1–0 defeat to Palermo. He scored his first professional goal on 23 December, helping his side beat Monopoli 1–0. Compagnon scored one goal and made three assists in 12 Serie C games in the first half of the season.

=== Juventus ===
On 2 February 2021, Compagnon joined Serie C club Juventus U23 – the reserve team of Juventus – on loan with an option to buy. He made his debut on 7 February, scoring a goal as a substitute against Livorno in a 6–0 win.

On 24 July 2021, he joined Juventus permanently. On 15 September, Compagnon failed a penalty in a 3–2 Coppa Italia Serie C win against Feralpisalò in injury time; in that game he had also scored a goal in the 67th minute. On 13 February 2022, Compagnon scored a brace in two minutes in the match won 3–0 against Mantova. On 4 May, Compagnon scored the 57th-minute winning goal in Juventus U23's 1–0 win to Pro Vercelli during the second round of the promotion play-offs, allowing his side to access the further round.

On 9 August, he renewed with Juventus until 2026. In September, Compagnon was given the number 10 jersey for Juventus Next Gen (whose name had been changed from Juventus U23). He missed the start of the new season due to a low-grade excision of the adductor region of the right thigh. On 28 October, Compagnon received his first call up by first-team coach Massimiliano Allegri for Lecce–Juventus, played the following day; he received two more calls-up throughout the season.

Throughout his spell at Juventus Next Gen, he scored 17 goals in 76 appearances, which made him the team's top goalscorer of all time as of 2023 before being eventually surpassed by Nikola Sekulov and Simone Guerra.

==== Loan to Feralpisalò ====
On 15 July 2023, Compagnon joined newly-promoted Serie B club Feralpisalò on a season-long loan Throughout the 2023–24 league season, he scored five goals in 29 appearances for the club, which eventually got relegated back to the third tier.

==== Loan to Catanzaro ====
On 15 July 2024, Compagnon joined Catanzaro on loan with an option to buy and a conditional obligation to buy. He signed a five-year contract with the club that would be valid if the option was exercised or the conditions for the obligation were triggered.

=== Venezia ===
On 12 July 2025, Compagnon was loaned to Venezia, with a conditional obligation to buy. He joined Venezia permanently on 1 July 2026, after the club won the 2025–26 Serie B and were promoted to Serie A.

==== Loan to Hellas Verona ====
On 29 July 2026, Compagnon was loaned to Hellas Verona, ahead of the 2026–27 season.

== Style of play ==
Compagnon is a left-footed winger who has good acceleration.

== Career statistics ==
=== Club ===
As of match played 10 May 2024

Appearances and goals by club, season and competition
Club	Season	League			Coppa Italia		Other		Total	
Club	Season	Division	Apps	Goals	Apps	Goals	Apps	Goals	Apps	Goals
Udinese	2019–20	Serie A	0	0	0	0	—		0	0
Potenza (loan)	2020–21	Serie C	12	1	1	0	—		13	1
Juventus U23 (loan)	2020–21	Serie C	12	2	—		0	0	12	2
Juventus Next Gen	2021–22	Serie C	24	6	—		7 (Note: Two appearances one goal in Coppa Italia Serie C, five appearances two goals in Serie C promotion play-offs)	3	31	9
Juventus Next Gen	2022–23	Serie C	25	4	—		4 (Note: Appearance in Coppa Italia Serie C)	1	29	5
Juventus Next Gen	Total		61	10	0	0	11	4	72	14
Feralpisalò (loan)	2023–24	Serie B	29	5	2	0	—		31	5
Career total			102	18	3	0	11	4	116	22
