= Fallou Cham =

Gambian footballer (born 2006)

Personal information
- Date of birth: 14 February 2006 (age 20)
- Place of birth: Gambia
- Height: 1.85 m (6 ft 1 in)
- Position: Right-back

Team information
- Current team: Hellas Verona
- Number: 70

Youth career
- Scafatese Calcio

Senior career*
Years	Team	Apps	(Gls)
2024–2025	Scafatese Calcio	14	(1)
2025–	Hellas Verona	6	(0)
- * Club domestic league appearances and goals as of 25 May 2026 ‡ National team caps and goals as of 13:53, 6 June 2025 (UTC)

Fallou Cham (born 14 February 2006) is a Gambian professional footballer who plays as a right-back for Serie B club Hellas Verona.

== Career ==
Cham began his senior career in Serie D with Scafatese Calcio in the 2024–25 season, with 18 appearances and a goal in his debut season in all competitions. On 14 July 2025, he transferred to the Serie A club Hellas Verona. He made his senior and professional debut with Hellas Verona in a 1–1 (5–3) Coppa Italia win over Audace Cerignola on 18 August 2025.
