= Folgaria =

Comune in Trentino, Italy

- Comune
- Comune di Folgaria
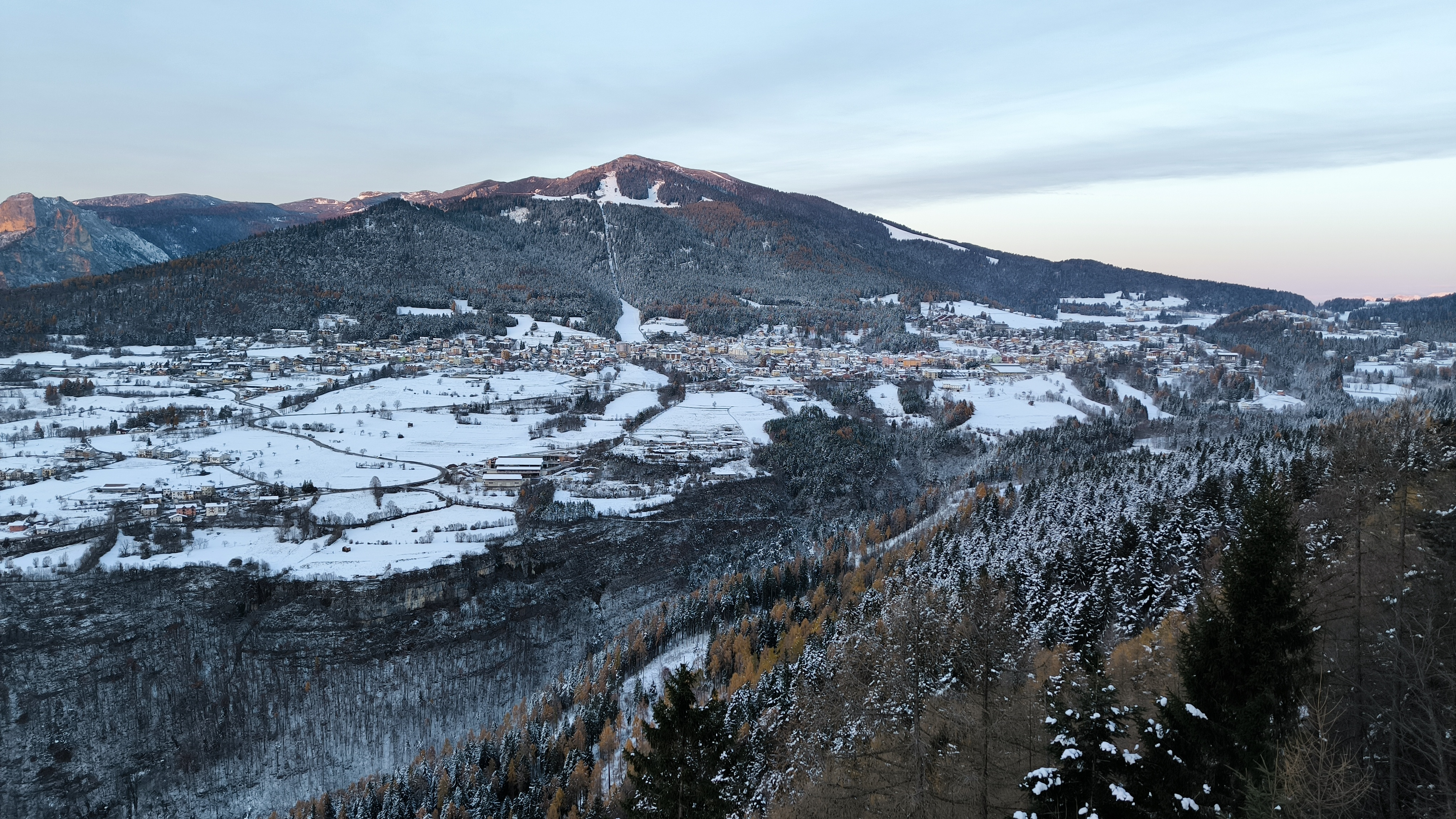
- View of Folgaria from Serrada

- Coat of arms

- Location within Italy Location within Trentino-Alto Adige/Südtirol
- Coordinates: 45°55′N 11°11′E
- Country: Italy
- Region: Trentino-Alto Adige/Südtirol
- Province: Trentino (TN)
- Frazioni: see list

Government
  - Mayor: Michael Rech (Civic list)

Area
  - Total: 71 km^{2} (27 sq mi)
- Elevation: 1,169 m (3,835 ft)

Population (2026)
  - Total: 3,169
  - Density: 45/km^{2} (120/sq mi)
- Demonym: Folgaretani
- Time zone: UTC+1 (CET)
  - Summer (DST): UTC+2 (CEST)
- Postal code: 38064
- Dialing code: 0464
- Website: Official website

Folgaria (Fólgaria in Trentino Dialect, Folgrait in Cimbrian) is an Italian municipality with 3,161 inhabitants in the Autonomous Province of Trento in Trentino-South Tyrol. Folgaria is historically associated with the municipalities of Santa Teresa di Gallura and Heringsdorf (Mecklenburg-Vorpommern).

== Physical geography ==
The municipality is located on the western slope of the Magnifica Comunità degli Altipiani cimbri, near the Vallagarina, at an altitude of 1168 meters above sea level at the foot of Mount Cornetto (2060 m in the Vigolana Mountain Range), along the right bank of the Rio Cavallo, a stream that flows through the eponymous valley down to Calliano.

The municipality includes seven main settlements (Costa, Serrada, Guardia, Mezzomonte, San Sebastiano, Carbonare, and Nosellari), as well as smaller villages like Pont, Ondertol, Dori, Molino Nuovo, Forreri, Ca Nove, Molini, Peneri, Fontani, Scandelli, Sotto il Soglio, Carpeneda, Mezzaselva, Erspameri, Francolini, Fondo Grande, Fondo Piccolo, Colpi, Nocchi, Perpruneri, Tezzeli, Morganti, Cueli-Liberi, Buse, Busatti, Dazio, Prà di Sopra, and Virti, located along the Rio Cavallo and the upper Astico Valley (Buse). The two rivers are separated by Passo Sommo (1341 m), a reference point for determining the locations of the different villages.

== Etymology ==
The name, first mentioned in 1196 as Fulgarida, derives from the Latin *filicāria, from filex meaning "fern". With the suffix -ēta, the name means "fern forest." A similar etymology exists for Folgarida, another place in Trentino, in Val di Sole.

In the Austrian Empire, during the period of Germanization before World War I, the form Vielgereuth was used in German.

== History ==
=== Early history: 13th to 16th century ===
As early as the 13th century, the Folgaria Plateau was part of the bishopric of Beseno, under the direct control of the Prince-Bishop of Trento.

The area was impacted by the Cimbri colonization, which led to the formation of several modern municipalities in the Folgaria area. In 1222, Folgaria was mentioned as one of the first free municipalities in Trentino, governed by its own administrative bodies. By around 1500, the Cimbri language was widespread in most of the pre-Sommo settlements and those along the Rio Cavallo/Rosspach valley.

The language persisted until the early 1960s, and certain expressions were still heard in the villages of Mezzomonte, Cueli-Liberi, San Sebastiano, Tezzeli, and Carbonare. Many geographical names still bear clear traces of the language.

Due to border disputes, the village submitted to the lords of Castel Beseno in 1285, the Castelbarco family (in 1315 the village issued its own statute, the Carta Ordinamentorum). By 1500, it freed itself from them and submitted to the Republic of Venice, which granted it complete autonomy in contrast to the feudal authority of the castle.

In 1510, Folgaria fell back under Habsburg control, leading to conflicts with the Trapp family, who attempted to restore their lost feudal dependence. The long dispute with the mountain village, known as the Causa Trappia, was marked by violence and crime and lasted for over two hundred years. In an armed confrontation in Carpeneda in February 1593, seven Folgaretan residents were killed. In their memory, a chapel called the Chapel of the Seven Widows was erected.

=== The Magnifica Comunità ===
The municipality still bears the title Magnifica Comunità. It is unclear exactly when the bishopric granted the title and the associated rights to independence and self-governance. Documentation is lacking, as much of the municipality's archive was destroyed during World War I. It is believed that the origins of the title date back to the 12th century, possibly in 1111, as part of the so-called Ghebardini treaties, which also led to the foundation of the Magnifica Comunità of Fiemme. The autonomy of the Magnifica Comunità di Folgaria was later confirmed by the Austrian Emperor. However, the Magnifica Comunità was dissolved in 1805 under the administrative reforms introduced by Napoleon Bonaparte, which affected the rights of the Austrian government. These Napoleonic policies were later confirmed by the Bavarian government. The people of Folgaria are still proud of these old traditions of autonomy, freedom, and self-rule. The name is still informally used on public buildings and on municipal signage.

== Points of interest ==
- Giardino Botanico Alpino di Passo Coe, an alpine nature preserve and botanical garden

== Demographic evolution ==
Historical population

Year	Pop.	±%
1861	?	—
1871	?	—
1881	?	—
1901	?	—
1911	?	—

Year	Pop.	±%
1921	4,632	—
1931	4,615	−0.4%
1936	3,902	−15.4%
1951	3,905	+0.1%
1961	3,697	−5.3%

Year	Pop.	±%
1971	3,343	−9.6%
1981	3,101	−7.2%
1991	3,083	−0.6%
2001	3,086	+0.1%

Source: Data from ISTAT
