= List of foreign Serie A players =

This is a list of foreign players (i.e. non-Italian players) in Serie A. The following players:

1. Have played at least one Serie A game for the respective club (seasons in which and teams that a player did not collect any caps in Serie A for have NOT been listed).
2. Have not been capped for the Italy national team on any level, independently from the birthplace, except for players born in San Marino and active in the Italy national team before the first official match of the San Marino national football team played on 14 November 1990 and players of Italian formation born abroad from Italian parents (so called 'Oriundi').
3. Have been born in Italy and were capped by a foreign national team, even after their Serie A spell. This includes players who have dual citizenship with Italy.

Players are sorted by the State, according to the FIFA eligibility rules:

1. They played for in a national team on any level. For footballers that played for two or more national teams it prevails:
  1. The one he played for on A level.
  2. The national team of birth.
2. If they never played for any national team on any level, it prevails the state of birth. For footballers born in **dissolved states** prevails the actual state of birth (e.g.: Yugoslavia -> Serbia, Montenegro, Croatia, etc.).

These are all the teams that have had at least one foreign player while playing in a Serie A season. Teams in bold are the ones currently playing in the 2026–27 Serie A season:

Alessandria, Ancona, Ascoli, Atalanta, Avellino, Bari, Benevento, Bologna, Brescia, Cagliari, Carpi, Catania, Catanzaro, Cesena, Chievo, Como, Cremonese, Crotone, Empoli, Fiorentina, Foggia, Frosinone, Genoa, Hellas Verona, Internazionale, Juventus, Lazio, Lecce, Lecco, Legnano, Livorno, Lucchese, Mantova, Messina, Milan, Modena, Monza, Napoli, Novara, Padova, Palermo, Parma, Perugia, Pescara, Piacenza, Pisa, Pistoiese, Pro Patria, Reggiana, Reggina, Roma, Salernitana, Sampdoria, Sassuolo, Siena, SPAL, Spezia, Torino, Treviso, Triestina, Udinese, Varese, Venezia, Vicenza.

These are the only teams that have participated in Serie A but have not had at least one foreign player:

Casale, Pro Vercelli, Ternana.

In bold: Players still active in Serie A and their respective teams in the current season.

== Oriundi and Naturalised players ==
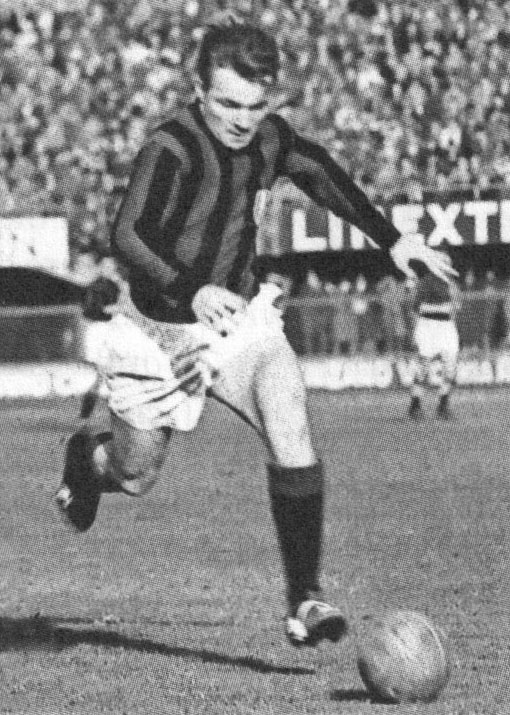
José Altafini playing for Milan

- (Switzerland) – Ermanno Aebi – Inter – 1910–22
- (Brazil) – José Altafini – Milan, Napoli, Juventus – 1958–76
- (Brazil) – Amauri – Napoli, Piacenza, Chievo, Palermo, Juventus, Parma, Fiorentina, Torino – 2000–02, 2003–16
- (Brazil) – André Anderson – Lazio – 2019–20, 2021–22
- (Uruguay) – Miguel Andreolo – Bologna, Lazio, Napoli – 1935–48
- (Australia) – **Antonio Arena** – **Roma** – 2025–
- (Argentina) – Antonio Angelillo – Inter, Roma, Milan, Lecco – 1957–68
- (Argentina) – Emilio Badini – Bologna, Spal – 1913–22
- (Argentina) – Cristian Battocchio – Udinese – 2010–12
- (Brazil) – Daniel Bessa – Verona, Genoa – 2017–19, 2020–22
- (Ghana) – Kingsley Boateng – Catania – 2013–14
- (Argentina) – Mauro Camoranesi – Verona, Juventus – 2000–06, 2007–10
- (Brazil) – Albano Canazza – Como – 1981–82
- (Argentina) – Renato Cesarini – Juventus – 1929–35
- (Argentina) – Arturo Chini Ludueña – Roma – 1927–34
- (Ukraine) – **Nikita Contini** – **Napoli** – 2023–24, 2025–
- (Brazil) – Dino da Costa – Roma, Fiorentina, Atalanta, Juventus – 1955–66
- (Brazil) – Alejandro Demaría – Lazio – 1931–34
- (Argentina) – Paolo Dellafiore – Treviso, Palermo, Torino, Parma, Cesena, Novara, Siena – 2005–13
- (Argentina) – Attilio Demaria – Inter, Novara, Legnano – 1932–36, 1938–46
- (Argentina) – Alfredo Devincenzi – Inter – 1934–36
- (Sweden) (Romania) – Nicolao Dumitru – Napoli – 2010–11
- (Brazil) – Éder – Empoli, Brescia, Cesena, Sampdoria, Inter – 2006–07, 2010–18
- (Brazil) – Emerson (Emerson Palmieri dos Santos) – Palermo, Roma – 2014–18
- (Uruguay) – Ricardo Faccio – Inter – 1933–36
- (Brazil) – Otávio Fantoni – Lazio – 1930–35
- (Uruguay) – Francisco Fedullo – Bologna – 1930–39
- (Brazil) – Luiz Felipe – Lazio – 2017–22
- (Uruguay) – Emanuele Figliola – Genoa – 1935–38
- (Ivory Coast) – **Seydou Fini** – Genoa, **Frosinone** – 2023–24, 2025–
- (South Africa) (England) – Eddie Firmani – Sampdoria, Inter, Genoa – 1955–61, 1962–63
- (Argentina) – Enrique Flamini – Lazio – 1939–52, 1953–54
- (Argentina) – Fernando Forestieri – Siena, Udinese – 2007–09, 2020–22
- (Uruguay) – Francesco Frione – Inter – 1932–35
- (Brazil) – Elisio Gabardo – Milan, Liguria, Genoa – 1935–41
- (Uruguay) – Alcides Ghiggia – Roma, Milan – 1953–62
- (Uruguay) – Carlos Gringa – Fiorentina, Lucchese – 1932–39
- (Argentina) – Enrique Guaita – Roma – 1933–35
- (Brazil) – Anfilogino Guarisi – Lazio – 1931–36, 1937–38
- (Brazil) – Paulo Innocenti – Bologna, Napoli – 1924–37
- (Brazil) – Fellipe Jack – Como – 2024–25
- (Brazil) – João Pedro – Palermo, Cagliari – 2010–11, 2014–15, 2016–22
- (Brazil) – Jorginho – Verona, Napoli – 2013–18
- (Argentina) – Cristian Ledesma – Lecce, Lazio – 2001–02, 2003–15
- (Argentina) – Julio Libonatti – Torino, Genoa – 1926–36
- (Argentina) – Francisco Lojacono – Vicenza, Fiorentina, Roma, Sampdoria – 1956–65
- (Argentina) – Leandro Martínez – Parma – 2007–08
- (Argentina) – Rinaldo Martino – Juventus – 1949–50
- (Uruguay) – Ernesto Mascheroni – Inter – 1934–36
- (Argentina) – Humberto Maschio – Bologna, Atalanta, Inter, Fiorentina – 1957–66
- (Argentina) – Luis Monti – Juventus – 1930–39
- (Argentina) – Miguel Montuori – Fiorentina – 1956–61
- (Scotland) – Giovanni Moscardini – Lucchese, Pisa, Genoa – 1919–??
- (Brazil) – Thiago Motta – Genoa, Inter – 2008–12
- (United States) – Alfonso Negro – Fiorentina, Napoli – 1934–39
- (Ghana) – Brian Oddei – Sassuolo – 2020–22
- (Argentina) – Raimundo Orsi – Juventus – 1928–35
- (Argentina) – Dani Osvaldo – Fiorentina, Bologna, Roma, Juventus, Inter – 2007–10, 2011–15
- (Argentina) – Gabriel Paletta – Parma, Milan, Atalanta – 2010–17
- (Germany) – **Matteo Palma** – **Udinese** – 2024–
- (Argentina) – Bruno Pesaola – Roma, Novara, Napoli, Genoa – 1947–61
- (Uruguay) – Cecilio Pisano – Sampdoria – 1937–38, 1939–40, 1941–43
- (Uruguay) – Roberto Porta – Inter – 1934–36
- (Uruguay) – Ettore Puricelli – Bologna, Milan – 1938–49
- (France) – Vincenzo Rennella – Cesena – 2011–12
- (Argentina) – Mateo Retegui – Genoa, Atalanta – 2023–25
- (Argentina) – Eduardo Ricagni – Juventus, Milan, Torino – 1953–58
- (Switzerland) – **Alessandro Romano** – Roma, **Cagliari** – 2025–
- (Brazil) – Rômulo – Fiorentina, Verona, Juventus, Genoa, Lazio, Brescia – 2011–16, 2017–20
- (Argentina) – Humberto Rosa – Sampdoria, Padova, Juventus, Napoli – 1954–64
- (Ghana) – Said Ahmed Said – Genoa – 2012–13
- (Paraguay) – Attila Sallustro – Napoli – 1925–37
- (Paraguay) – Oreste Sallustro – Napoli, Bari – 1929–33, 1934–37
- (Uruguay) – Raffaele Sansone – Bologna, Napoli – 1931–46
- (Brazil) – Fabiano Santacroce – Napoli, Parma – 2007–13, 2014–15
- (Argentina) – Ezequiel Schelotto – Cesena, Catania, Atalanta, Inter, Sassuolo, Parma, Chievo – 2010–15, 2018–19
- (Uruguay) – Juan Alberto Schiaffino – Milan, Roma – 1954–62
- (Argentina) – Alessandro Scopelli – Roma – 1933–35
- (Brazil) – Pedro Sernagiotto – Juventus – 1932–34
- (Argentina) – Omar Sívori – Juventus, Napoli – 1957–69
- (Brazil) – Angelo Sormani – Mantova, Roma, Sampdoria, Milan, Napoli, Fiorentina, Vicenza – 1961–76
- (Brazil) – Rafael Toloi – Roma, Atalanta – 2013–14, 2015–25
- (Uruguay) – Victor Tortora – Venezia – 1939–43, 1946–47
- (Uruguay) – Ulisse Uslenghi – Livorno, Napoli – 1933–38
- (Ghana) – **Samuel Wiafe** – **Genoa** – 2026–
- (England) – Giuseppe Wilson – Lazio – 1969–79
- (Ghana) – Kelvin Yeboah – Genoa – 2021–22
- (Brazil) – Maximo Zenildo Zappino – Frosinone – 2015–16

== Africa (CAF) ==
=== Algeria ===
- Houssem Aouar – Roma – 2023–24
- Ishak Belfodil – Bologna, Parma, Inter, Livorno – 2011–15
- **Rafik Belghali** – Verona, **Torino** – 2025–
- Samir Beloufa – Milan – 1997–98
- Ismaël Bennacer – Empoli, Milan – 2018–25
- Mohamed Fares – Verona, SPAL, Lazio, Genoa – 2014–16, 2017–22
- **Farès Ghedjemis** – **Frosinone** – 2023–24, 2026–
- Abdelkader Ghezzal – Siena, Bari, Cesena, Parma – 2008–12, 2014–15
- Rachid Ghezzal – Fiorentina – 2019–20
- Faouzi Ghoulam – Napoli – 2013–22
- Mehdi Léris – Chievo, Sampdoria, Pisa – 2017–21, 2022–23, 2025–26
- Mourad Meghni – Bologna, Lazio – 2002–05, 2007–10
- Djamel Mesbah – Lecce, Milan, Parma, Livorno, Sampdoria, Crotone – 2010–17
- Adam Ounas – Napoli, Cagliari, Crotone – 2017–19, 2020–23
- Saphir Taïder – Bologna, Inter, Sassuolo – 2011–18
- Ahmed Touba – Lecce – 2023-24
- Hassan Yebda – Napoli, Udinese – 2010–11, 2013–14
- Karim Zedadka – Napoli – 2022–23

=== Angola ===
- Bastos – Lazio – 2016–21
- Bruno Gaspar – Fiorentina – 2017–18
- **Kialonda Gaspar** – **Lecce** – 2024–
- Zito Luvumbo – Cagliari – 2023–26
- Dolly Menga – Torino – 2012–13
- **M'Bala Nzola** – Spezia, Fiorentina, Pisa, Sassuolo, **Cagliari** – 2020–24, 2025–
- Rui Modesto – Udinese – 2024–26

=== Burkina Faso ===
- Bryan Dabo – Fiorentina, SPAL, Benevento – 2017–21
- Rachid Kouda – Parma – 2026–27
- Latif Ouedraogo – Genoa – 2025–26

=== Cameroon ===
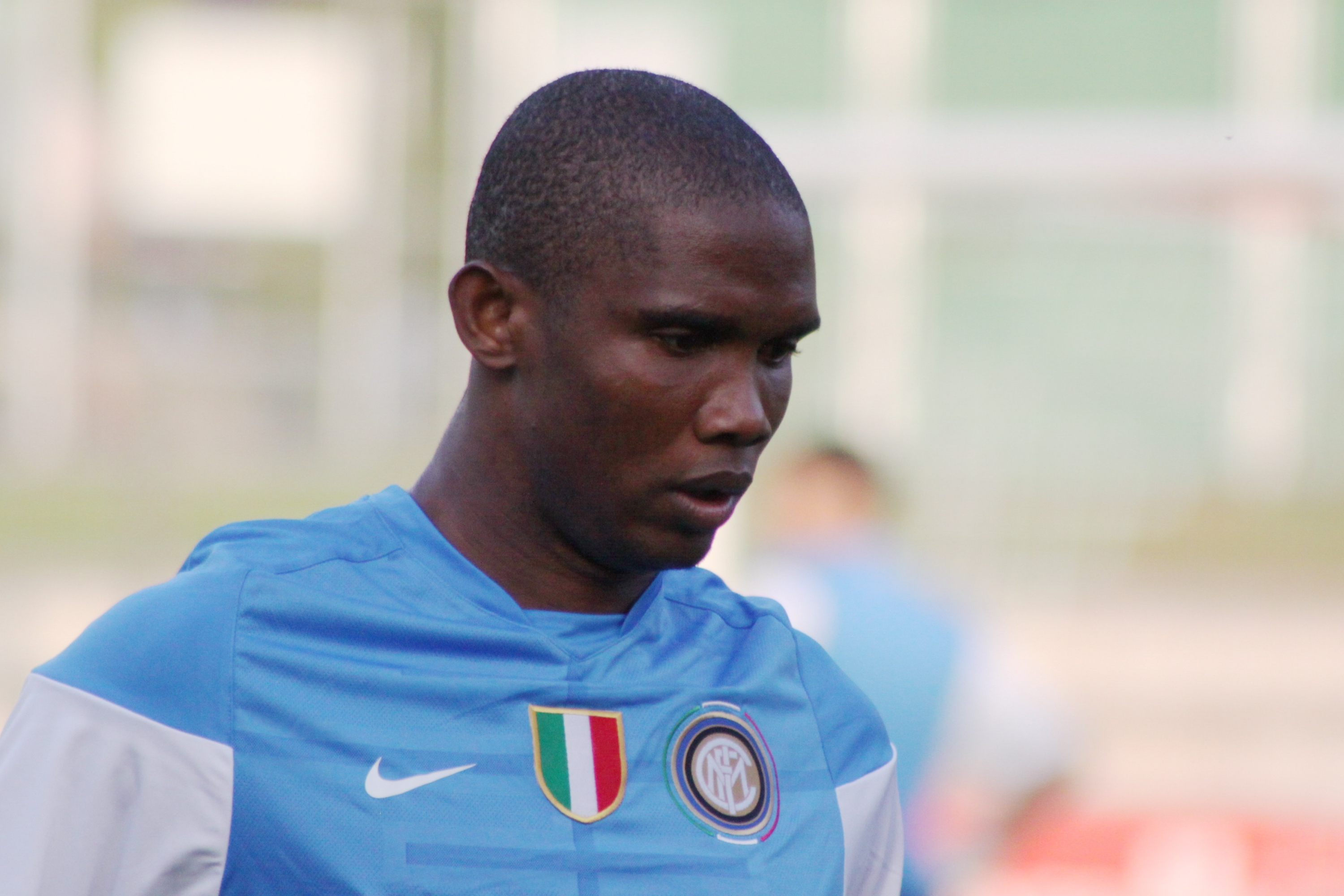
Samuel Eto'o, a protagonist of the 2010 treble by Inter, training. He also played 6 months for Sampdoria.

- **André-Frank Zambo Anguissa** – **Napoli** – 2021–
- Nicky Beloko – Fiorentina – 2018–19
- Jean-Claude Billong – Benevento – 2017–18
- **Enzo Ebosse** – **Udinese**, Verona, Torino – 2022–
- Samuel Eto'o – Inter, Sampdoria – 2009–11, 2014–15
- Antonio Ghomsi – Messina – 2006–07
- Martin Hongla – Verona – 2021–24
- Thomas Job – Sampdoria, Ascoli – 2003–04, 2006–07
- Daniel Maa Boumsong – Inter – 2005–06
- Patrick Mboma – Cagliari, Parma – 1998–2002
- Joseph Minala – Lazio – 2013–14
- Faris Moumbagna – Cremonese – 2025–26
- Nicolas N'Koulou – Torino – 2017–21
- Jean-Pierre Nsame – Venezia – 2021–22
- Olivier Ntcham – Genoa – 2015–17
- François Omam-Biyik – Sampdoria – 1997–98
- André Onana – Inter – 2022–23
- Jean Onana – Genoa – 2024–26
- Frank Ongfiang – Venezia – 2001–02
- Jérôme Onguéné – Genoa – 2020–21
- Augustine Simo – Torino – 1995–96
- Rigobert Song – Salernitana – 1998–99
- Adrien Tameze – Atalanta, Verona, Torino – 2019–26
- Jackson Tchatchoua – Verona – 2023–25
- **Enzo Tchato** – **Frosinone** – 2026–
- Pierre Womé – Vicenza, Roma, Bologna, Brescia, Inter – 1996–97, 1998–2002, 2004–06

=== Cape Verde ===
- Cabral (Cabral Adilson Tavares Varela) – Genoa – 2013–14
- Jovane Cabral – Lazio, Salernitana – 2021–22, 2023–24
- Alessio Da Cruz – Parma – 2018–19
- Dailon Livramento – Verona – 2024–25

=== Central African Republic ===
- Geoffrey Kondogbia – Inter – 2015–17
- Junior Sambia – Salernitana, Empoli – 2022–25

=== Congo (Republic of the Congo) ===
- Gabriel Charpentier – Parma – 2024–25
- Silvère Ganvoula – Monza – 2024–25
- Antoine Makoumbou – Cagliari – 2023–25
- Dominique Malonga – Torino, Cesena – 2007–08, 2010–12
- Jordi Mboula – Verona – 2023–24
- Senna Miangué – Inter, Cagliari – 2016–18

=== DR Congo (Democratic Republic of the Congo) ===
- Samuel Bastien – Chievo – 2016–18
- Brian Bayeye – Torino – 2022–23
- Giannelli Imbula – Lecce – 2019–20
- Gaël Kakuta – Lazio – 2013–14
- Pedro Kamata – Bari – 2009–10
- **Willy Kambwala** – **Como** – 2026–
- Paul-José M'Poku – Cagliari, Chievo – 2014–16
- Stephy Mavididi – Juventus – 2018–19
- Jason Mayélé – Cagliari, Chievo – 1999–2000, 2001–02
- Olivier N'Siabamfumu – Ascoli – 2006–07
- Granddi Ngoyi – Palermo – 2014–15
- Shabani Nonda – Roma – 2005–06
- Samuel Ntanda Lukisa – Sampdoria – 2022–23
- Charles Pickel – Cremonese – 2022–23
- Axel Tuanzebe – Napoli – 2021–22

=== Egypt ===
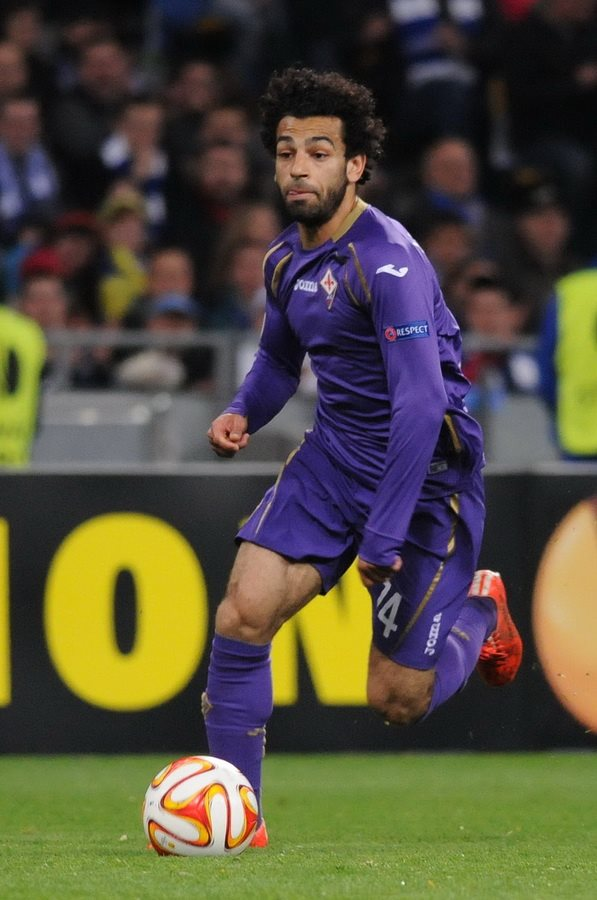
Mohamed Salah playing for Fiorentina in 2015

- Hazem Emam – Udinese – 1996–98
- **Omar Fayed** – **Frosinone** – 2026–
- Ahmed Hegazy – Fiorentina – 2012–14
- Mido – Roma – 2004–05
- Hany Said – Bari – 1998–99, 2000–01
- Mohamed Salah – Fiorentina, Roma – 2014–17

=== Equatorial Guinea ===
- **Saúl Coco** – **Torino** – 2024–
- José Machín – Parma, Monza – 2018–19, 2022–24
- Pedro Obiang – Sampdoria, Sassuolo – 2010–11, 2012–15, 2019–21, 2022–24

=== Eritrea ===
- Henok Goitom – Udinese – 2004–05

=== Gabon ===
- Catilina Aubameyang – Milan – 2002–03
- Mario Lemina – Juventus – 2015–17
- **Anthony Oyono** – **Frosinone** – 2023–24, 2026–

=== Gambia (The Gambia) ===
- Musa Barrow – Atalanta, Bologna – 2017–23
- Assan Ceesay – Lecce – 2022–23
- Fallou Cham – Verona – 2025–26
- Ebrima Colley – Atalanta, Verona, Spezia – 2019–22
- Omar Colley – Sampdoria – 2018–23
- Ebrima Darboe – Roma – 2020–22
- **Alieu Fadera** – Como, Sassuolo, **Cagliari** – 2024–
- Lamin Jallow – Chievo – 2016–17
- Musa Juwara – Chievo, Bologna – 2018–21
- Ali Sowe – Chievo – 2012–13

=== Ghana ===
- Maxwell Acosty – Fiorentina, Chievo, Crotone – 2011–12, 2013–14, 2016–17
- Afriyie Acquah – Palermo, Parma, Sampdoria, Torino, Empoli – 2010–19
- Felix Afena-Gyan – Roma, Cremonese – 2021–23
- Daniel Kofi Agyei – Fiorentina – 2009–10
- Emmanuel Agyemang-Badu – Udinese, Verona – 2009–17, 2018–20
- Augustine Ahinful – Venezia – 1998–99
- Masahudu Alhassan – Genoa – 2011–12
- Ebenezer Annan – Bologna – 2021–22
- Stephen Appiah – Udinese, Parma, Brescia, Juventus, Bologna, Cesena – 1997–2005, 2009–11
- Kwadwo Asamoah – Udinese, Juventus, Inter, Cagliari – 2008–21
- Kwame Ayew – Lecce – 1993–94
- Ahmed Barusso – Roma, Siena – 2007–09
- Richmond Boakye – Genoa, Atalanta – 2009–11, 2014–15
- Kevin-Prince Boateng – Milan, Sassuolo, Fiorentina – 2010–13, 2015–16, 2018–20
- Raman Chibsah – Sassuolo, Frosinone, Benevento – 2013–16, 2017–19
- Isaac Cofie – Genoa, Chievo, Carpi – 2009–10, 2012–18
- Amadou Diambo – Benevento – 2020–21
- Isaac Donkor – Inter – 2014–15
- Godfred Donsah – Verona, Cagliari, Bologna – 2013–19
- Alfred Duncan – Inter, Livorno, Sampdoria, Sassuolo, Fiorentina, Cagliari, Venezia – 2012–25
- Mark Edusei – Sampdoria, Catania – 2004–08
- Caleb Ekuban – Genoa – 2021–22, 2023–26
- Michael Essien – Milan – 2013–15
- Abdullah Fusseini – Torino – 1999–2000
- Mohammed Gargo – Udinese – 1996–2002, 2003–04
- Bright Gyamfi – Benevento – 2017–18
- Asamoah Gyan – Udinese – 2003–04, 2006–08
- Emmanuel Gyasi – Spezia, Empoli – 2020–25
- Samuel Kuffour – Roma, Livorno – 2005–07
- Tariq Lamptey – Fiorentina – 2025–26
- John Mensah – Chievo, Modena – 2002–05
- Sulley Muntari – Udinese, Inter, Milan, Pescara – 2002–07, 2008–15, 2016–17
- Nicholas Opoku – Udinese – 2018–20
- Emmanuel Osei – Livorno – 2004–05
- Abédi Pelé – Torino – 1994–96
- Amidu Salifu – Fiorentina, Catania – 2010–13
- **Ibrahim Sulemana** – Verona, Cagliari, Atalanta, Bologna, **Sassuolo** – 2022–
- **Kamaldeen Sulemana** – **Atalanta** – 2025–
- Nana Welbeck – Brescia – 2010–11
- Philip Yeboah Ankrah – Verona – 2020–21

=== Guinea ===
- Gaston Camara – Inter – 2014–15
- Ibrahima Camara – Parma – 2004–06
- Mady Camara – Roma – 2022–23
- Karamoko Cissé – Atalanta, Benevento – 2006–07, 2017–18
- Moustapha Cissé – Atalanta – 2021–22
- Cheick Condé – Venezia – 2024–25
- Kévin Constant – Chievo, Genoa, Milan, Bologna – 2010–14, 2015–16
- Amadou Diawara – Bologna, Napoli, Roma – 2015–22
- **Mohamed Kaba** – **Lecce** – 2023–
- Abdoulaye Touré – Genoa – 2021–22

=== Guinea-Bissau ===
- **Beto** – Udinese, **Fiorentina** – 2021–23, 2026–
- **Fali Candé** – Venezia, **Sassuolo** – 2024–
- Ednilson – Roma – 1999–2000
- Carlos Embaló – Palermo – 2016–17
- Leandro Sanca – Spezia – 2022–23
- Ronaldo Vieira – Sampdoria, Verona, Torino – 2018–23

=== Ivory Coast ===
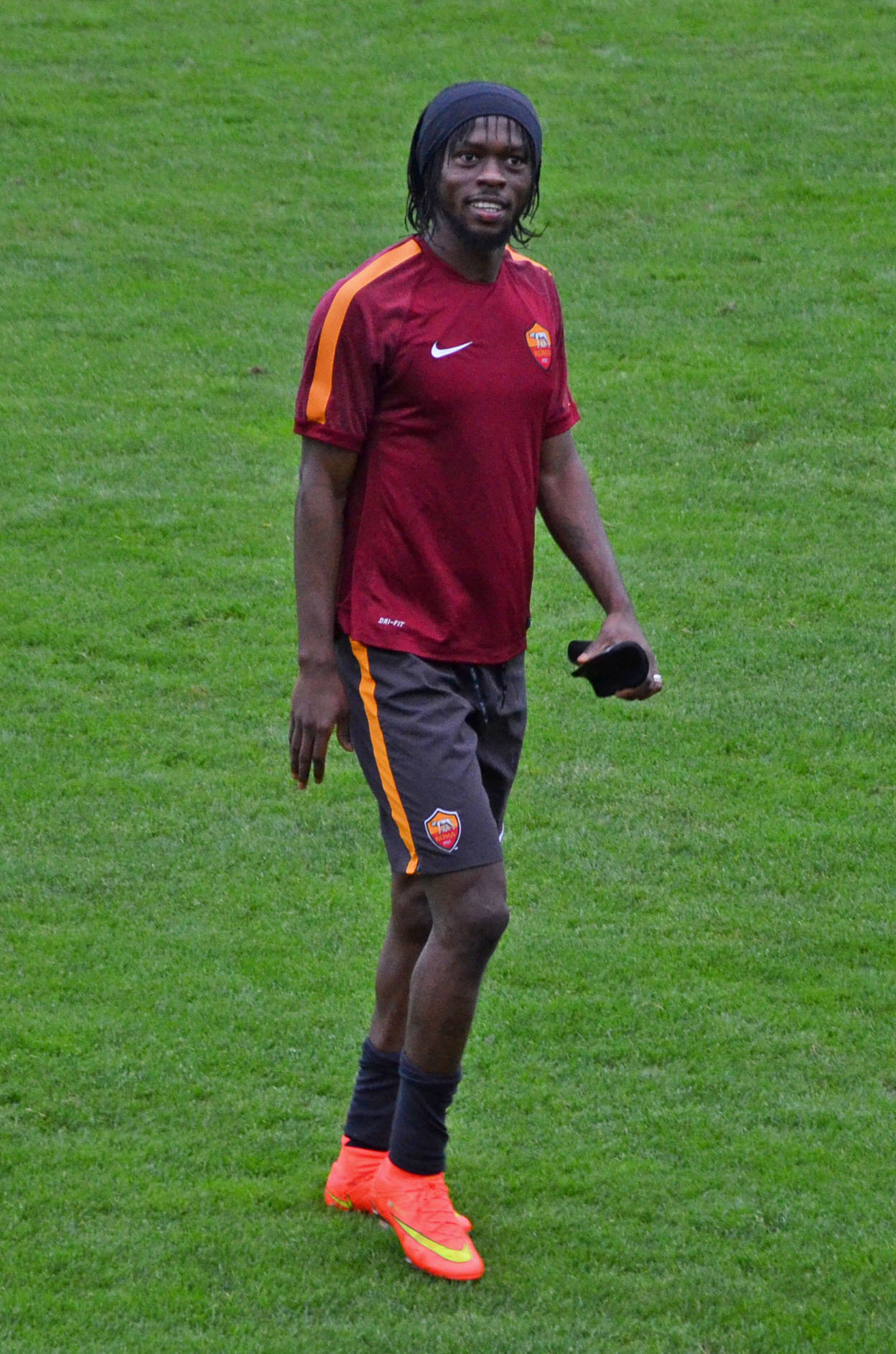
Gervinho with Roma in 2014

- Junior Ajayi – Verona – 2024–26
- Jean-Daniel Akpa Akpro – Lazio, Empoli, Monza, Verona – 2020–26
- Ibrahima Bakayoko – Livorno, Messina – 2005–07
- Sol Bamba – Palermo – 2014–15
- **Vakoun Issouf Bayo** – **Udinese** – 2025–
- **Jérémie Boga** – Sassuolo, Atalanta, **Juventus** – 2018–23, 2025–
- **Ange-Yoan Bonny** – Parma, **Inter** – 2024–
- Drissa Camara – Parma – 2020–21, 2024–25
- Maxwel Cornet – Genoa – 2024–26
- Amad Diallo – Atalanta – 2019–21
- Serge Dié – Reggina – 1999–2000
- Koffi Djidji – Torino, Crotone – 2018–24
- Cyril Domoraud – Inter – 1999–2000
- Thierry Doubai – Udinese – 2011–12
- Seydou Doumbia – Roma – 2014–15
- Seko Fofana – Udinese – 2016–20
- Gervinho – Roma, Parma – 2013–16, 2018–21
- Assane Demoya Gnoukouri – Inter – 2014–17
- Cedric Gondo – Salernitana – 2021–22
- **Christ Inao Oulaï** – **Fiorentina** – 2026–
- **Hassane Kamara** – **Udinese** – 2023–
- **Franck Kessié** – **Atalanta**, Milan – 2016–22, 2026–
- Axel Cédric Konan – Lecce, Torino – 2000–02, 2003–07, 2008–09
- Ben Lhassine Kone – Torino, Como – 2021–22, 2024–25
- Moussa Koné – Atalanta – 2013–14
- **Odilon Kossounou** – **Atalanta** – 2024–
- Christian Kouamé – Genoa, Fiorentina, Empoli – 2018–21, 2022–26
- Owen Kouassi – Lecce – 2025–26
- Arnaud Kouyo – Lecce – 2003–04
- Alban Lafont – Fiorentina – 2018–19
- Saliou Lassissi – Parma, Sampdoria, Fiorentina – 1998–2001
- Christian Manfredini – Chievo, Lazio, Perugia – 2001–09
- **Evan Ndicka** – **Roma** – 2023–
- Siriki Sanogo – Benevento – 2017–18, 2020–21
- Ibrahiman Scandroglio – Empoli – 1998–99
- Alassane Sidibe – Atalanta – 2021–22
- Wilfried Singo – Torino – 2019–23
- **Oumar Solet** – **Udinese** – 2024–
- Tallo – Roma – 2011–12
- Chaka Traorè – Parma, Milan – 2020–21, 2023–24
- **Hamed Junior Traorè** – Empoli, Sassuolo, Napoli, **Genoa** – 2018–24, 2026–
- François Zahoui – Ascoli – 1981–83
- Marco Zoro – Messina – 2004–07

=== Kenya ===
- McDonald Mariga – Parma, Inter – 2007–08, 2009–13, 2014–15

=== Liberia ===
- George Weah – Milan – 1995–2000

=== Libya ===
- Al-Musrati – Verona – 2025–26
- Ahmad Benali – Pescara, Crotone – 2016–18, 2020–21
- Jehad Muntasser – Treviso – 2005–06
- Al-Saadi Gaddafi – Perugia, Udinese – 2003–04, 2005–06

=== Madagascar ===
- Andy Pelmard – Lecce – 2024–25

=== Mali ===
- Abdoulaye Camara – Udinese – 1999–2000
- **Lassana Coulibaly** – Salernitana, **Lecce** – 2021–
- Woyo Coulibaly – Parma, Sassuolo – 2024–26
- Cheick Diabaté – Benevento – 2017–18
- Souleymane Diamoutene – Perugia, Lecce, Roma, Bari – 2003–06, 2008–12
- Drissa Diarra – Lecce – 2003–05
- Cheick Keita – Bologna – 2017–18
- Seydou Keita – Roma – 2014–16
- Mamadou Samassa – Chievo – 2012–14
- Mohamed Sissoko – Juventus, Fiorentina – 2007–11, 2012–13
- Alassane També – Genoa – 2014–15
- **El Bilal Touré** – Atalanta, **Parma** – 2023–24, 2026–
- Bakaye Traoré – Milan – 2012–13
- Molla Wagué – Udinese – 2014–19

=== Mauritania ===
- Souleymane Doukara – Catania – 2012–14
- **Oumar Ngom** – **Lecce** – 2025–

=== Morocco ===
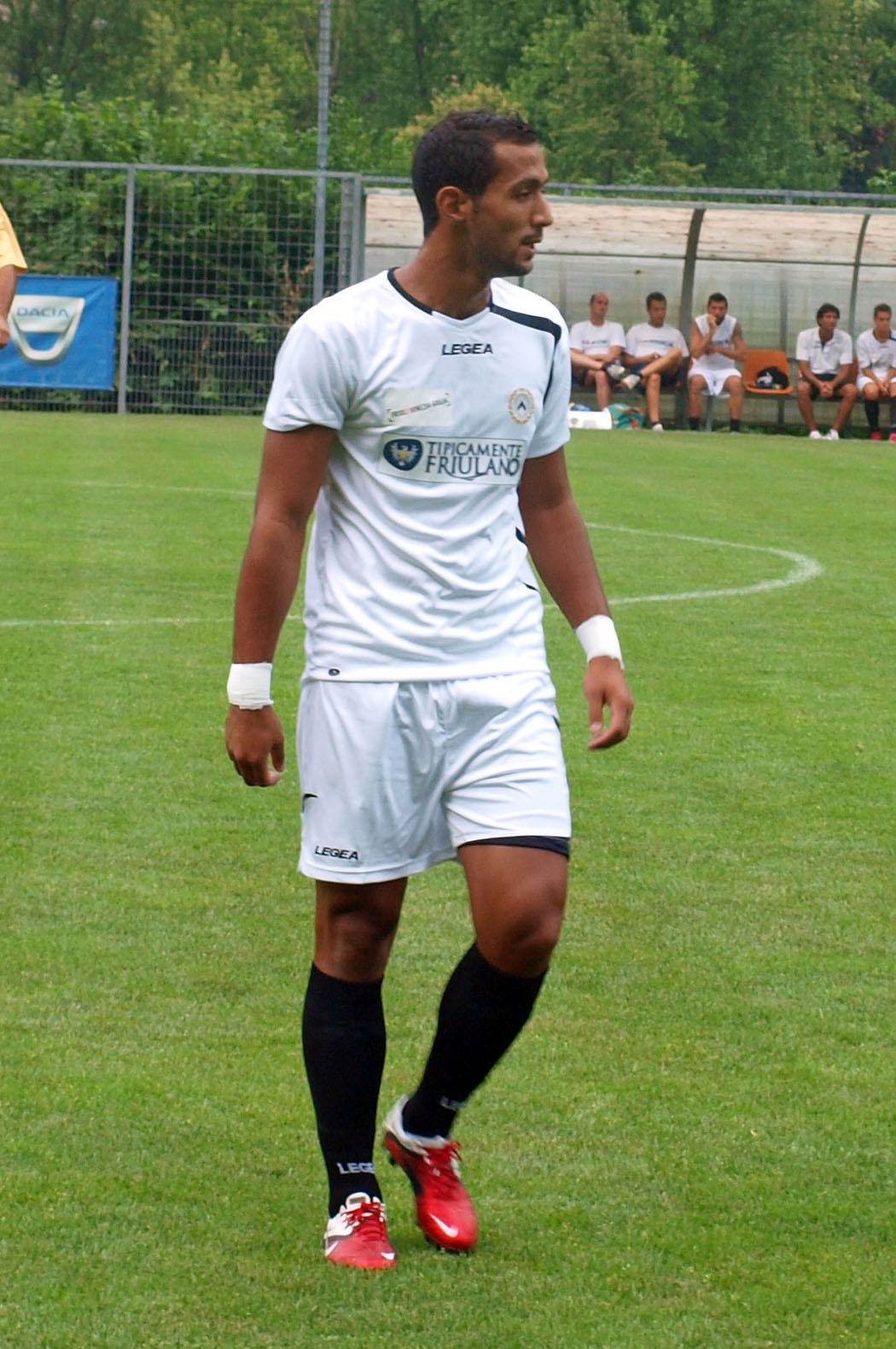
Mehdi Benatia training for Udinese

- **Zakaria Aboukhlal** – **Torino** – 2025–
- Jamal Alioui – Perugia – 2003–04
- Sofyan Amrabat – Verona, Fiorentina – 2019–23, 2024–25
- **Adam Bakoune** – **Monza** – 2026–
- **Reda Belahyane** – Verona, **Lazio** – 2023–
- Mehdi Benatia – Udinese, Roma, Juventus – 2010–14, 2016–19
- Zakarya Bergdich – Genoa – 2014–15
- Soufiane Bidaoui – Parma – 2014–15
- Mehdi Bourabia – Sassuolo, Spezia, Frosinone – 2018–24
- Ouasim Bouy – Palermo – 2016–17
- Walid Cheddira – Frosinone, Napoli, Sassuolo, Lecce – 2023–26
- Manuel da Costa – Fiorentina, Sampdoria – 2008–09
- Brahim Díaz – Milan – 2020–23
- Neil El Aynaoui – Roma – 2025–27
- **Anouar El Azzouzi** –**Frosinone** – 2026–
- **Oussama El Azzouzi** –**Bologna** – 2023–25, 2026–
- Saad El Haddad – Venezia – 2024–25
- Mounir El Hamdaoui – Fiorentina – 2012–13, 2014–15
- Moestafa El Kabir – Cagliari – 2011–12
- Omar El Kaddouri – Napoli, Torino, Empoli – 2012–17
- Abdelhamid El Kaoutari – Palermo – 2015–16
- Jawad El Yamiq – Genoa – 2017–18, 2019–20
- Zouhair Feddal – Palermo, Parma – 2014–15
- **Redouane Halhal** – **Venezia** – 2026–
- Abdou Harroui – Sassuolo, Frosinone, Verona – 2021–26
- Achraf Hakimi – Inter – 2020–21
- Abderrazak Jadid – Brescia, Parma – 2002–03, 2004–05, 2011–12
- Omar Khailoti – Bologna – 2020–21
- Houssine Kharja – Roma, Siena, Genoa, Inter, Fiorentina – 2005–06, 2007–12
- Sofian Kiyine – Chievo, Venezia – 2016–17, 2018–19, 2021–22
- Achraf Lazaar – Palermo, Benevento – 2014–16, 2017–18
- Kévin Malcuit – Napoli, Fiorentina – 2018–22
- **Youssef Maleh** – Fiorentina, **Lecce**, Empoli, Cremonese – 2021–
- Ibrahim Maroufi – Inter – 2006–07
- Adam Masina – Bologna, Udinese, Torino – 2015–18, 2022–26
- Rachid Neqrouz – Bari – 1997–2001
- Mounir Obbadi – Verona – 2014–15
- Amir Richardson – Fiorentina – 2024–26
- Abdelilah Saber – Napoli – 2000–01
- Abdelhamid Sabiri – Sampdoria, Fiorentina – 2021–23, 2025–26
- Anass Salah-Eddine – Roma – 2024–25
- Adel Taarabt – Milan, Genoa – 2013–14, 2016–18

=== Niger ===
- **Rahim Alhassane** – **Bologna** – 2026–
- **Konan N'Dri** – **Lecce** – 2024–

=== Nigeria ===
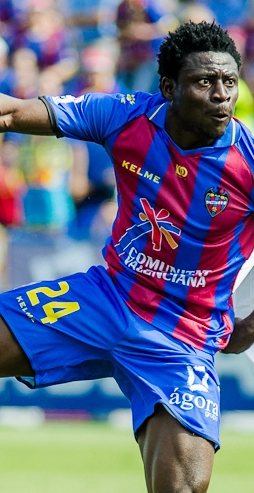
Obafemi Martins

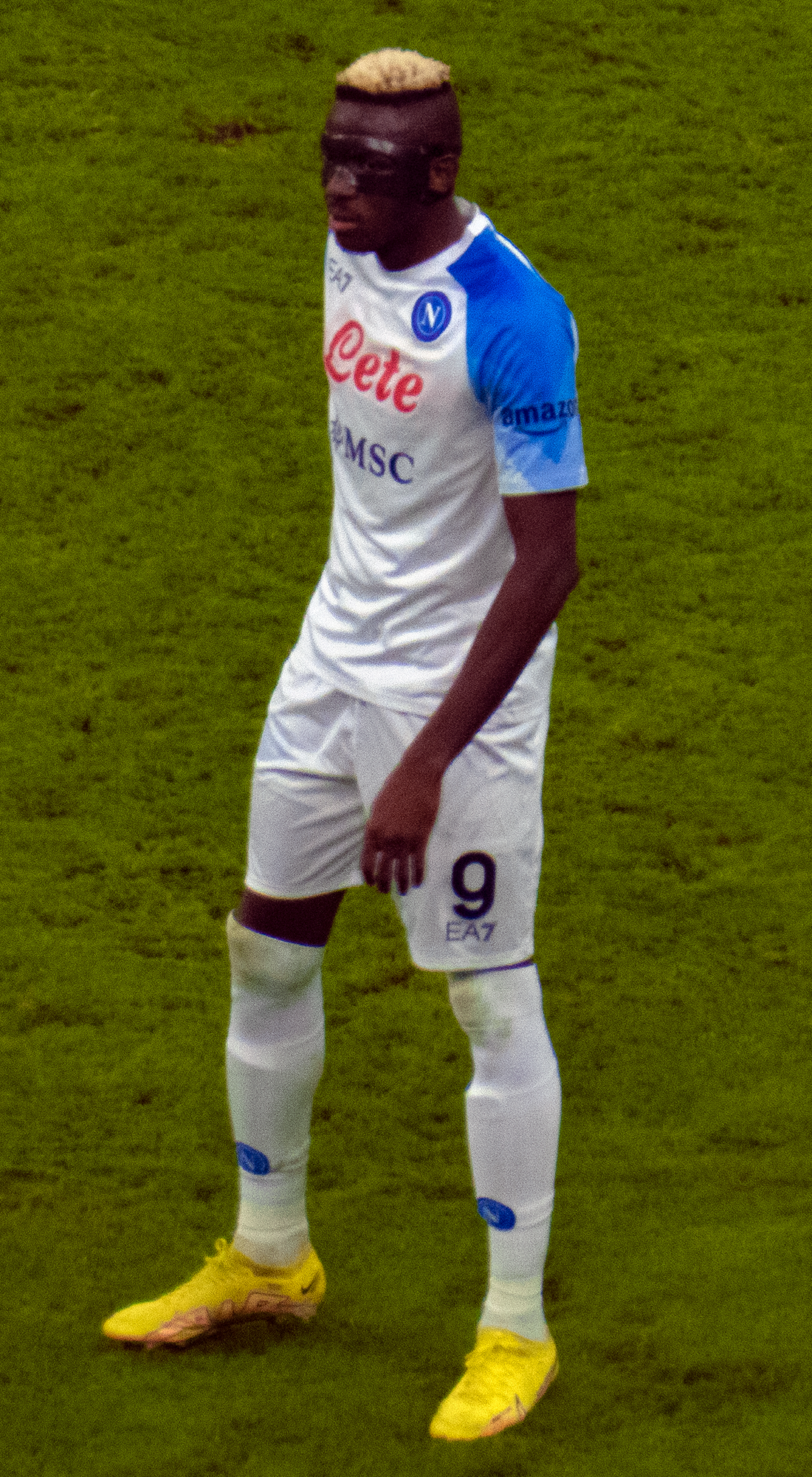
Victor Osimhen was the first African player to win the Capocannoniere, scoring 26 goals in Napoli's title-winning 2022–23 campaign.

- **Akor Adams** – **Venezia** – 2026–
- Daniel Adejo – Reggina – 2008–09
- Ola Aina – Torino – 2018–20, 2021–23
- Akande Ajide – Roma – 2003–04
- **Ebenezer Akinsanmiro** – Inter, Pisa, **Monza** – 2023–24, 2025–
- Mohammed Aliyu – Milan – 1998–2000
- Ibrahim Babatunde – Piacenza – 2002–03
- David Ankeye – Genoa – 2023–25
- **Samuel Chukwueze** – **Milan** – 2023–
- **Fisayo Dele-Bashiru** – **Lazio** – 2024–
- Cyriel Dessers – Cremonese – 2022–23
- Rafiu Durosinmi – Pisa – 2025–26
- Osarimen Ebagua – Catania – 2011–12
- Tyronne Ebuehi – Venezia, Empoli – 2021–25
- **Kingsley Ehizibue** – Udinese, **Genoa** – 2022–
- Hugo Enyinnaya – Bari – 1999–2001
- Odion Ighalo – Udinese, Cesena – 2008–09, 2010–11
- Chukwubuikem Ikwuemesi – Salernitana – 2023–24
- Ikechukwu Kalu – Sampdoria – 2007–08
- Nwankwo Kanu – Inter – 1997–99
- Ademola Lookman – Atalanta – 2022–26
- Stephen Makinwa – Modena, Atalanta, Palermo, Lazio, Reggina, Chievo – 2003–10
- Obafemi Martins – Inter – 2002–06
- Jerry Mbakogu – Carpi – 2015–16
- Kingsley Michael – Bologna – 2019–20, 2021–22
- Victor Moses – Inter – 2019–20
- Joel Obi – Inter, Parma, Torino, Chievo, Salernitana – 2010–19, 2021–22
- Victor Obinna – Chievo, Inter – 2005–07, 2008–09, 2013–14
- Nwankwo Obiora – Inter, Parma – 2010–12
- Christian Obodo – Perugia, Fiorentina, Udinese, Lecce – 2001–10, 2011–12
- Michael Odibe – Siena – 2009–10
- Nnamdi Oduamadi – Milan – 2010–11
- Edward Ofere – Lecce – 2010–12
- David Okereke – Venezia, Cremonese, Torino – 2021–24, 2025–26
- **Maduka Okoye** – **Udinese** – 2023–
- Orji Okwonkwo – Bologna – 2016–19
- Sunday Oliseh – Reggiana, Juventus – 1994–95, 1999–2000
- Mathew Olorunleke – Messina – 2005–06
- Akeem Omolade – Torino – 2002–03
- Ogenyi Onazi – Lazio – 2011–16
- Gift Orban – Verona – 2025–26
- Victor Osimhen – Napoli – 2020–24
- Umar Sadiq – Roma, Bologna, Torino – 2015–18
- Nwankwo Simy – Crotone, Salernitana – 2016–18, 2020–22, 2023–24
- Isaac Success – Udinese – 2021–24
- Taye Taiwo – Milan – 2011–12
- William Troost-Ekong – Udinese, Salernitana – 2018–20, 2022–23
- Adewale Wahab – Roma – 2003–04
- Taribo West – Inter, Milan – 1997–2000
- Kenneth Zeigbo – Venezia – 1998–99

=== Réunion ===
- Samuel Souprayen – Verona – 2015–16, 2017–18 dual French international

=== Senegal ===
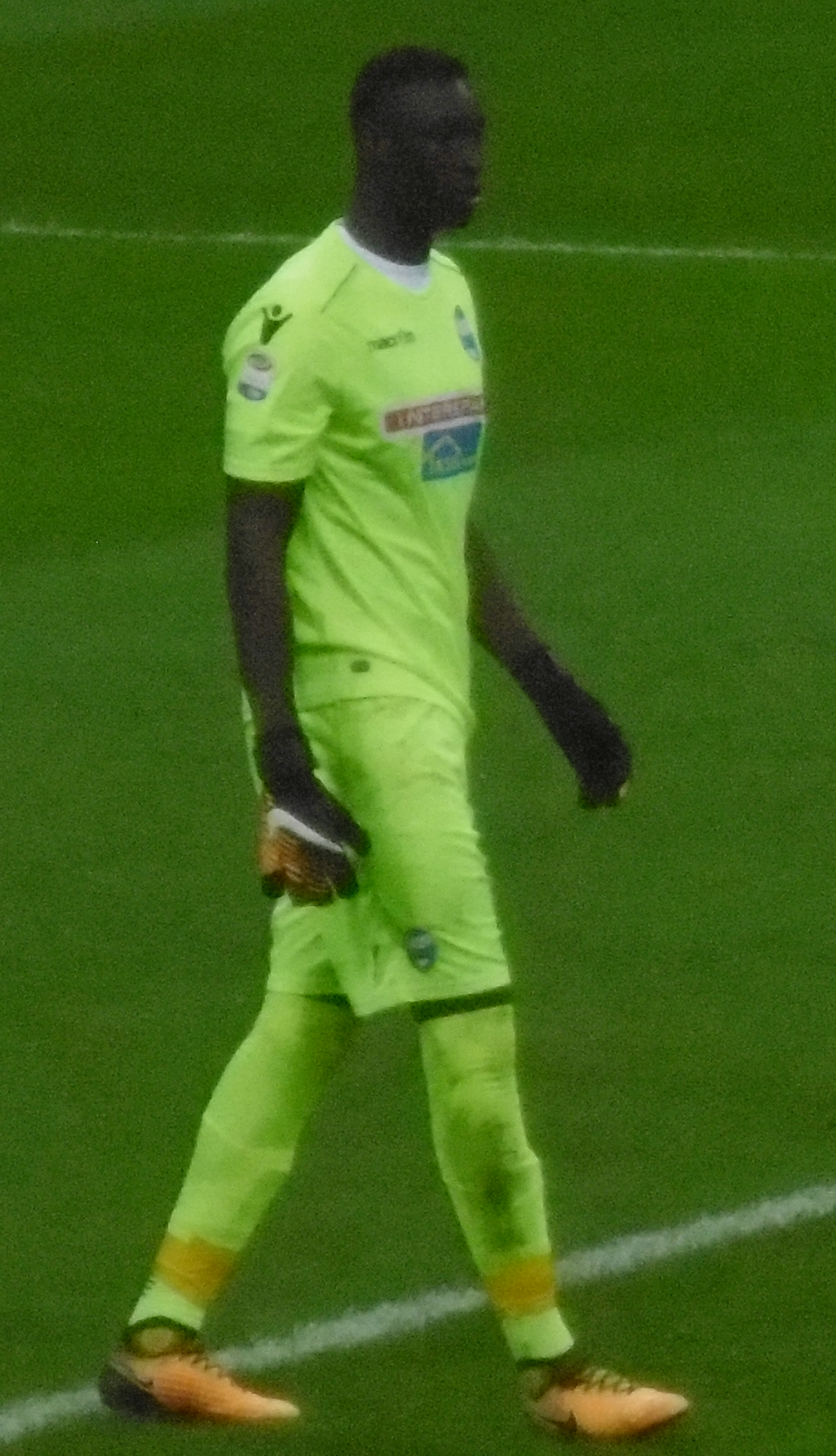
Alfred Gomis, the second African goalkeeper in Serie A after his brother Lys, and the first to be starter in the category.

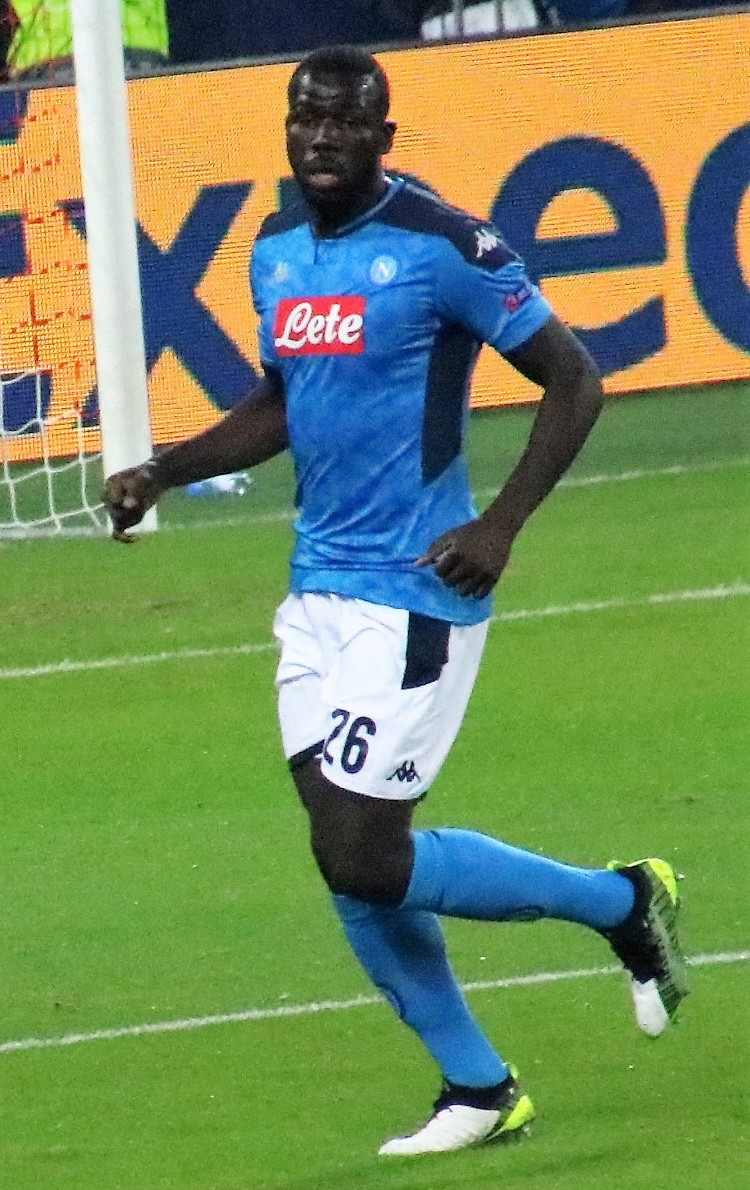
Kalidou Koulibaly made over 200 Serie A appearances for Napoli

- Khouma Babacar – Fiorentina, Sassuolo, Lecce – 2009–12, 2014–20
- Fodé Ballo-Touré – Milan – 2021–23
- Issa Cissokho – Genoa – 2015–16
- Ferdinand Coly – Perugia, Parma – 2003–04, 2005–08
- Mamadou Coulibaly – Pescara, Udinese, Salernitana – 2016–17, 2020–22, 2023–24
- Boulaye Dia – Salernitana, Lazio – 2022–27
- Abdou Diakhaté – Parma – 2018–19
- **Assane Diao** – **Como** – 2024–
- Djibril Diawara – Torino – 1999–2000
- Abou Diop – Torino – 2012–13
- Assane Dioussé – Empoli, Chievo – 2015–17, 2018–19
- Diaw Doudou – Torino – 2006–07
- Boukary Dramé – Chievo, Atalanta, SPAL – 2011–18
- Ricardo Faty – Roma – 2006–07, 2009–10
- Mikayil Faye – Cremonese – 2025–26
- Alfred Gomis – SPAL – 2017–19
- Lys Gomis – Torino – 2013–14
- **Idrissa Gueye** – **Udinese** – 2025–
- Diomansy Kamara – Modena – 2002–04
- Mamadou Kanoute – Benevento – 2017–18
- Baldé Keita – Lazio, Inter, Sampdoria, Cagliari, Monza – 2013–17, 2018–19, 2020–22, 2024–25
- **Abdul Salam Konaté** – **Parma** – 2026–
- Moussa Konaté – Genoa – 2013–14
- Kalidou Koulibaly – Napoli – 2014–22
- Ibrahima Mbaye – Livorno, Inter, Bologna – 2013–22
- Maodo Malick Mbaye – Chievo – 2013–14
- David Mbodj – Pescara – 2012–13
- **Paul Mendy** – **Cagliari** – 2025–
- Roger Mendy – Pescara – 1992–93
- **Abdoulaye Ndiaye** – **Parma** – 2025–
- M'Baye Niang – Milan, Genoa, Torino, Empoli – 2012–18, 2023–24
- Cheikh Niasse – Verona – 2024–26
- Welle Ossou – Livorno – 2009–10
- Mohamed Sarr – Milan – 2001–02
- Mouhamadou Fallou Sarr – Cremonese – 2022–23
- **Pape Matar Sarr** – **Juventus** – 2026–
- Demba Seck – Torino, Frosinone – 2021–24
- **Demba Thiam** – SPAL, **Monza** – 2019–20, 2026–
- Mame Baba Thiam – Empoli – 2016–17
- Mamadou Tounkara – Lazio – 2013–14, 2016–17
- Armand Traoré – Juventus – 2010–11
- Papa Waigo – Genoa, Fiorentina, Lecce – 2007–09, 2010–11

=== Sierra Leone ===
- Kewullay Conteh – Atalanta, Venezia, Palermo – 1995–96, 2001–02, 2004–07
- Mohamed Kallon – Bologna, Cagliari, Reggina, Vicenza, Inter – 1997–2004
- Yayah Kallon – Genoa, Verona – 2020–24
- Augustus Kargbo – Crotone – 2020–21
- Rodney Strasser – Milan, Lecce, Parma – 2008–13

=== Somalia ===
- Ayub Daud – Juventus – 2008–09
- Abel Gigli – Parma – 2009–10

=== South Africa ===
- Mark Fish – Lazio – 1996–97
- Philemon Masinga – Bari – 1997–2001
- Siyabonga Nomvethe – Udinese – 2001–02, 2003–04
- David Nyathi – Cagliari – 1998–99
- Eric Tinkler – Cagliari – 1996–97
- Joel Untersee – Empoli – 2018–19

=== Togo ===
- Faride Alidou – Verona – 2024–25
- **Sadik Fofana** – **Lecce** – 2025–
- Serge Gakpé – Genoa, Atalanta, Chievo – 2015–17

=== Tunisia ===
- Tijani Belaid – Inter – 2004–05
- Yohan Benalouane – Cesena, Parma, Atalanta – 2010–15
- Dylan Bronn – Salernitana – 2022–24
- Anas Haj Mohamed – Parma – 2024–25
- Wajdi Kechrida – Salernitana – 2021–22
- Karim Laribi – Sassuolo – 2013–14, 2015–16
- Hamza Rafia – Lecce – 2023–25
- Karim Saidi – Lecce – 2005–06

=== Uganda ===
- Elio Capradossi – Roma, Spezia – 2017–18, 2020–21

=== Zambia ===
- Lameck Banda – Lecce – 2022–26
- **Joseph Liteta** – **Cagliari** – 2025–
- Kingstone Mutandwa – Cagliari – 2023–25, 2026–27

=== Zimbabwe ===
- Jordan Zemura – Udinese – 2023–26

== Asia (AFC) ==
=== Australia ===
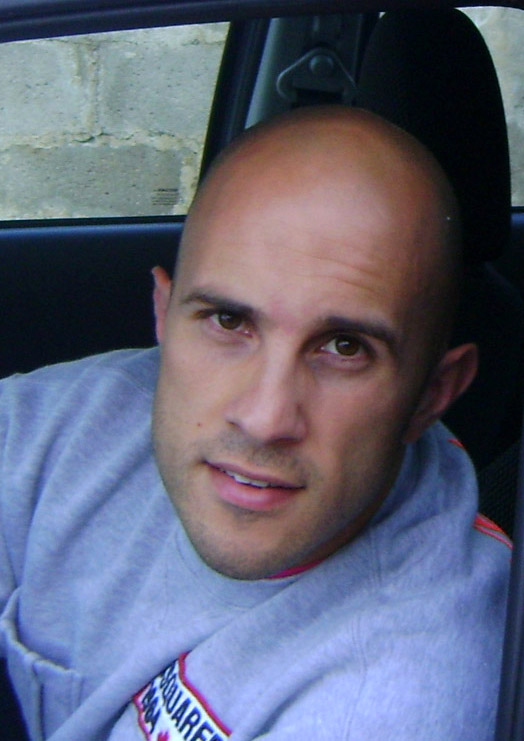
Mark Bresciano, who played in European competitions with Parma and Palermo

- John Aloisi – Cremonese – 1995–96
- Mark Bresciano – Parma, Palermo, Lazio – 2002–11
- Joshua Brillante – Fiorentina, Empoli – 2014–15
- Alessandro Circati – Parma – 2024–26
- Frank Farina – Bari – 1991–92
- Bruno Fornaroli – Sampdoria – 2008–09, 2010–11
- Vincenzo Grella – Empoli, Parma, Torino – 1998–99, 2002–08
- Ajdin Hrustic – Verona – 2022–23
- Zeljko Kalac – Perugia, Milan – 2002–04, 2005–09
- Paul Okon – Lazio, Fiorentina – 1996–97, 1998–2000
- Trent Sainsbury – Inter – 2016–17
- James Troisi – Atalanta – 2012–13
- **Cristian Volpato** – Roma, **Sassuolo** – 2021–24, 2025–

=== Indonesia ===
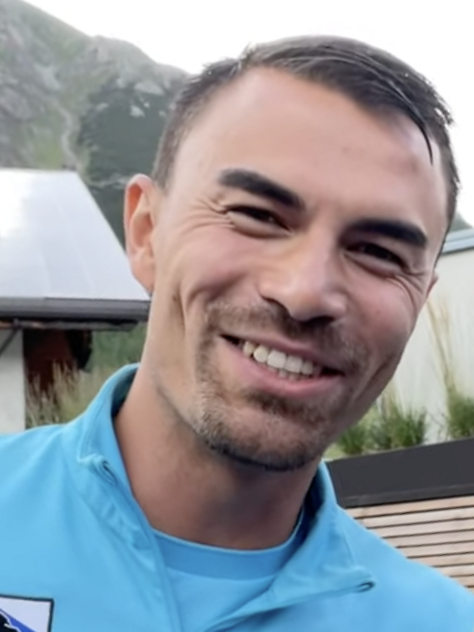
Emil Audero, Indonesian player of Italian descent who played in European competitions with Juventus, Sampdoria, Inter, Como and Cremonese

- Emil Audero – Juventus, Sampdoria, Inter, Como, Cremonese – 2016–17, 2018–26
- Kevin Diks – Fiorentina – 2016–17
- **Jay Idzes** – Venezia, **Sassuolo** – 2024–

=== Iran ===
- Sardar Azmoun – Roma – 2023–24
- Rahman Rezaei – Perugia, Messina, Livorno – 2001–03, 2004–08
- Ali Samereh – Perugia – 2001–02
- Mehdi Taremi – Inter – 2024–25

=== Iraq ===
- Ali Adnan – Udinese, Atalanta – 2015–19
- Ali Jasim – Como – 2024–25
- Aimar Sher – Spezia – 2021–22

=== Japan ===
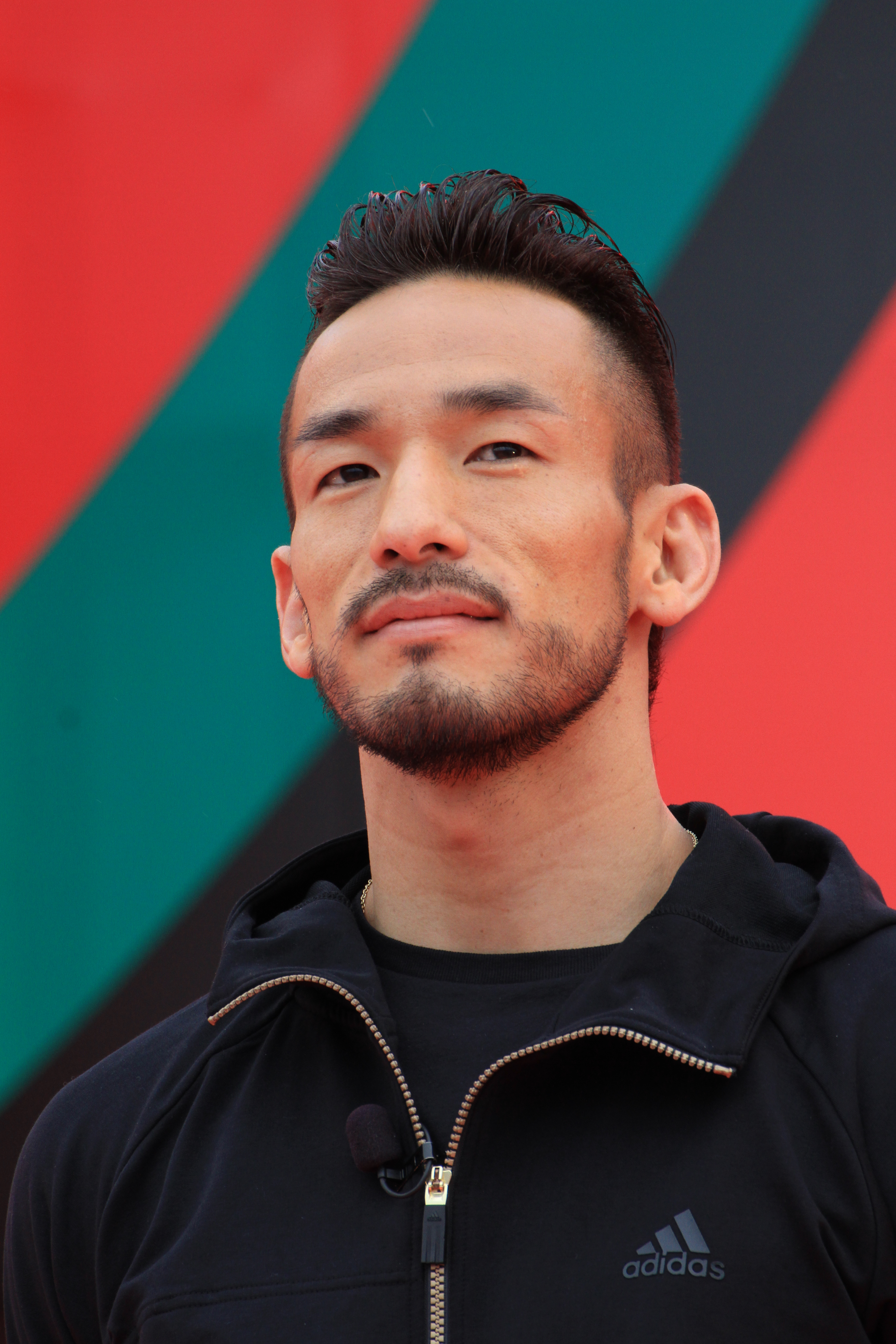
Hidetoshi Nakata has been an important player for Roma's Scudetto in 2001

- Keisuke Honda – Milan – 2013–17
- Daichi Kamada – Lazio – 2023–24
- Kazuyoshi Miura – Genoa – 1994–95
- Takayuki Morimoto – Catania, Novara – 2006–13
- Yuto Nagatomo – Cesena, Inter – 2010–18
- Shunsuke Nakamura – Reggina – 2002–05
- Hidetoshi Nakata – Perugia, Roma, Parma, Bologna, Fiorentina – 1998–2005
- Hiroshi Nanami – Venezia – 1999–2000
- Mitsuo Ogasawara – Messina – 2006–07
- Masashi Oguro – Torino – 2006–08
- **Yukinari Sugawara** – **Cagliari** – 2026–
- Zion Suzuki – Parma – 2024–26
- Takehiro Tomiyasu – Bologna – 2019–22
- Atsushi Yanagisawa – Sampdoria, Messina – 2003–06
- Maya Yoshida – Sampdoria – 2019–22

=== North Korea ===
- Han Kwang-song – Cagliari – 2016–18

=== Qatar ===
- Guilherme (dos Santos Torres) – Udinese – 2014–16

=== Saudi Arabia ===
- Saud Abdulhamid – Roma – 2024–25

=== South Korea ===
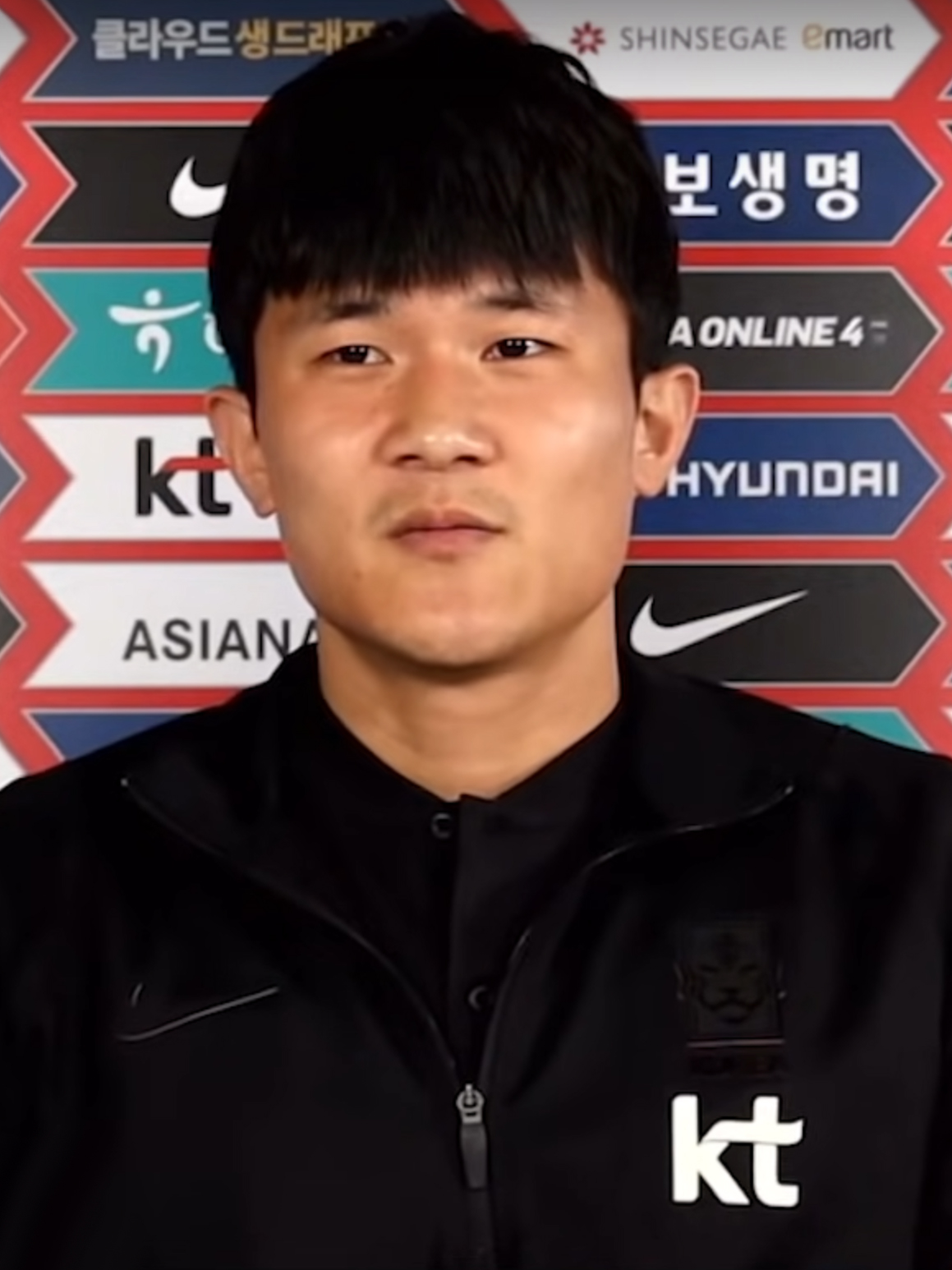
Kim Min-jae won a Serie A title with Napoli in 2023

- Ahn Jung-hwan – Perugia – 2000–02
- Kim Min-jae – Napoli – 2022–23
- Lee Seung-woo – Verona – 2017–18

=== Uzbekistan ===
- Eldor Shomurodov – Genoa, Roma, Spezia, Cagliari – 2020–25
- Ilyos Zeytulayev – Reggina – 2004–06

== Europe (UEFA) ==
=== Albania ===
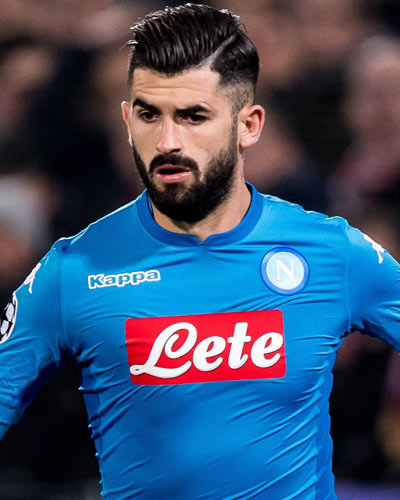
Elseid Hysaj made over 300 Serie A appearances for Empoli, Napoli and Lazio

- Arlind Ajeti – Frosinone, Torino, Crotone – 2015–18
- Kristjan Asllani – Empoli, Inter, Torino – 2021–26
- Nedim Bajrami – Empoli, Sassuolo – 2021–24
- Migjen Basha – Torino – 2012–15
- Etrit Berisha – Lazio, Atalanta, SPAL, Torino, Empoli – 2013–20, 2021–22, 2023–24
- **Medon Berisha** – **Lecce** – 2023–
- Erjon Bogdani – Reggina, Verona, Siena, Chievo, Livorno, Cesena – 1999–2001, 2002–03, 2005–13
- Loro Boriçi – Lazio – 1941–43
- Lorik Cana – Lazio – 2011–15
- Edgar Çani – Palermo, Catania – 2007–08, 2012–13
- Marvin Çuni – Frosinone – 2023–24
- Kastriot Dermaku – Parma, Lecce – 2019–21, 2022–23
- Berat Djimsiti – Atalanta, Benevento – 2015–16, 2017–26
- **Luis Hasa** – **Frosinone** – 2026–
- Elseid Hysaj – Empoli, Napoli, Lazio – 2014–26
- **Ardian Ismajli** – Spezia, Empoli, **Torino** – 2020–
- Naim Krieziu – Roma, Napoli – 1939–43, 1945–48, 1950–52
- **Gabriel Kulla** – **Sassuolo** – 2026–
- Marash Kumbulla – Verona, Roma, Sassuolo – 2019–24
- Andi Lila – Parma – 2014–15
- Riza Lushta – Bari, Juventus, Napoli, Alessandria – 1939–43, 1945–48
- Rey Manaj – Inter, Pescara, Spezia – 2015–17, 2021–22
- Agon Mehmeti – Palermo – 2011–12
- Ledian Memushaj – Pescara, Benevento – 2016–18
- **Mario Mitaj** – **Genoa** – 2026–
- Emanuele Ndoj – Brescia – 2019–20
- Angelo Ndrecka – Chievo – 2018–19
- **Joi Nuredini** – **Genoa** – 2025–
- Ylber Ramadani – Lecce – 2023–26
- Xhulian Rrudho – Chievo – 2006–07
- **Alen Sherri** – **Cagliari** – 2024–25
- Stiven Shpendi – Empoli – 2023–24
- Ervin Skela – Ascoli – 2006–07
- Thomas Strakosha – Lazio – 2016–22
- Igli Tare – Brescia, Bologna, Lazio – 2000–08
- Frédéric Veseli – Empoli, Salernitana – 2016–17, 2018–19, 2021–22
- Giacomo Vrioni – Juventus – 2019–21

=== Armenia ===
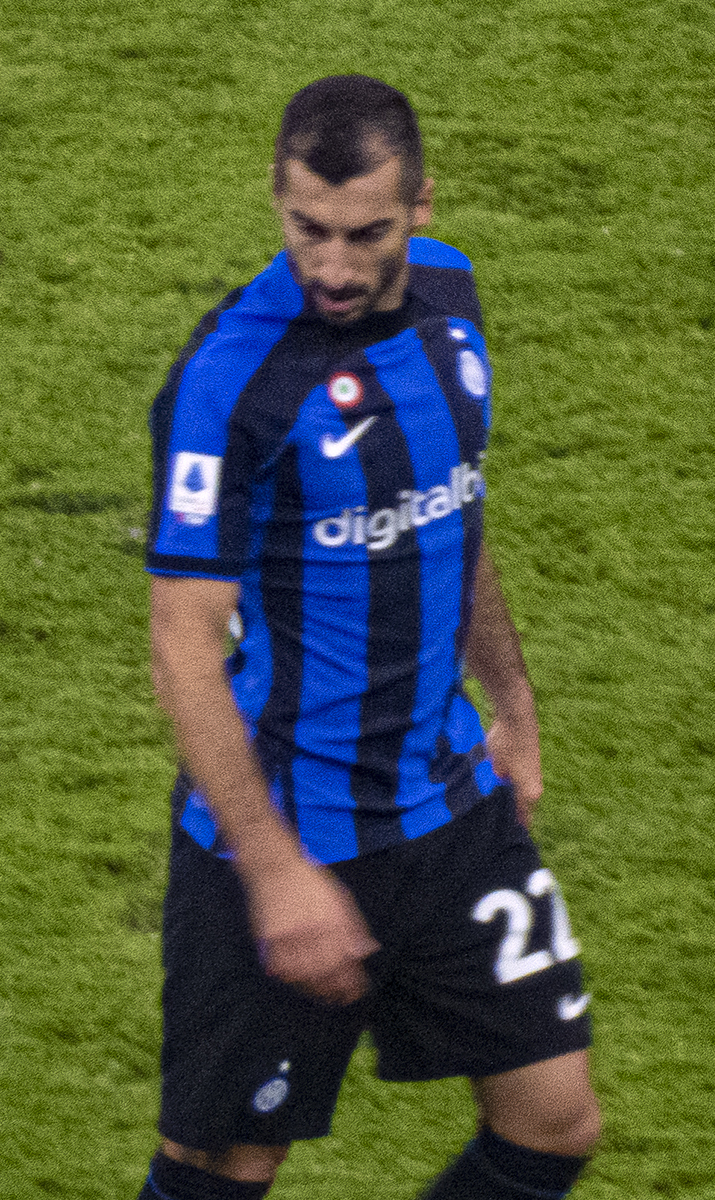
Henrikh Mkhitaryan was the first Armenian to play in Serie A

- **Henrikh Mkhitaryan** – Roma, **Inter** – 2019–

=== Austria ===
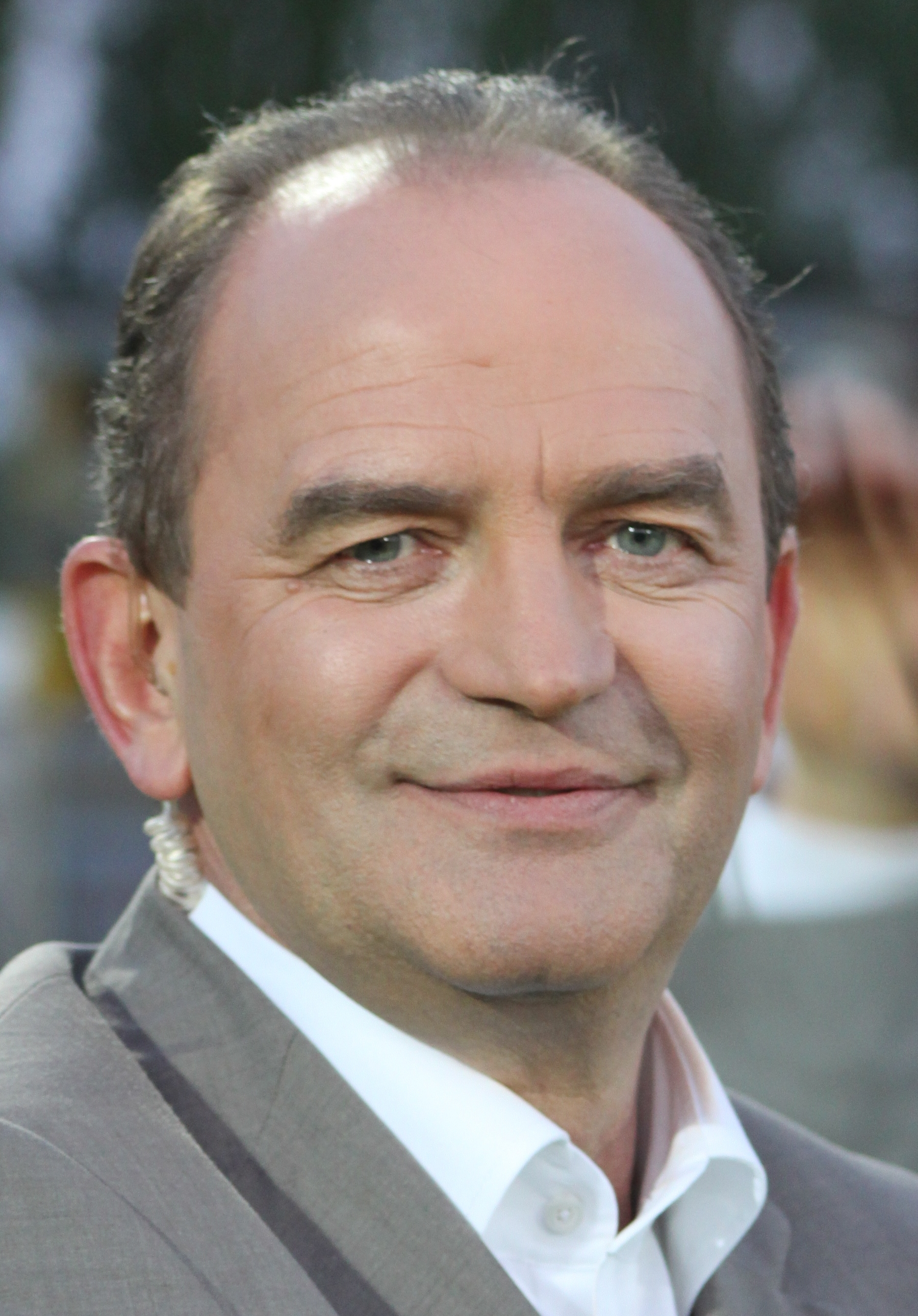
Herbert Prohaska won a scudetto with Roma in 1983

- Emanuel Aiwu – Cremonese – 2022–23
- **David Alaba** – **Udinese** – 2026–
- Marko Arnautović – Inter, Bologna – 2009–10, 2021–25
- Matthias Braunöder – Como – 2024–25
- Flavius Daniliuc – Salernitana, Verona – 2022–25
- György Garics – Napoli, Atalanta, Bologna – 2007–14
- **Florian Grillitsch** – **Frosinone** – 2026–
- Robert Gucher – Frosinone – 2015–16
- Michael Hatz – Reggiana, Lecce – 1996–98
- Erwin Hoffer – Napoli – 2009–10
- Robert Ibertsberger – Venezia – 1999–2000
- Arnel Jakupović – Empoli – 2016–17
- Engelbert König – Fiorentina, Lazio, Sampdoria, Genoa – 1940–41, 1942–43, 1945–50
- Michael Konsel – Roma, Venezia – 1997–2000
- Valentino Lazaro – Inter, Torino – 2019–20, 2022–26
- Alex Manninger – Fiorentina, Torino, Siena, Juventus – 2001–03, 2004–05, 2006–10
- Dieter Mirnegg – Como – 1981–82
- Ernst Ocwirk – Sampdoria – 1956–61
- Anton Polster – Torino – 1987–88
- Stefan Posch – Bologna, Atalanta, Como – 2022–26
- Herbert Prohaska – Inter, Roma – 1980–83
- Jürgen Prutsch – Livorno – 2009–10
- **David Puczka** – **Genoa** – 2026–
- Jürgen Säumel – Torino – 2008–09
- Walter Schachner – Cesena, Torino, Avellino – 1981–88
- **Romano Schmid** – **Frosinone** – 2026–
- David Schnegg – Venezia – 2021–22
- Markus Schopp – Brescia – 2001–05
- Lukas Spendlhofer – Inter – 2012–13
- Michael Svoboda – Venezia – 2021–22, 2024–25
- Maximilian Ullmann – Venezia – 2021–22

=== Belarus ===
- Sergei Aleinikov – Juventus, Lecce – 1989–91 ( (Soviet Union) while active)
- Sergei Gurenko – Roma, Parma, Piacenza – 1999–2000, 2001–03
- Vitali Kutuzov – Milan, Sampdoria, Parma, Bari – 2001–02, 2004–07, 2009–11
- Mikhail Sivakov – Cagliari – 2009–11

=== Belgium ===
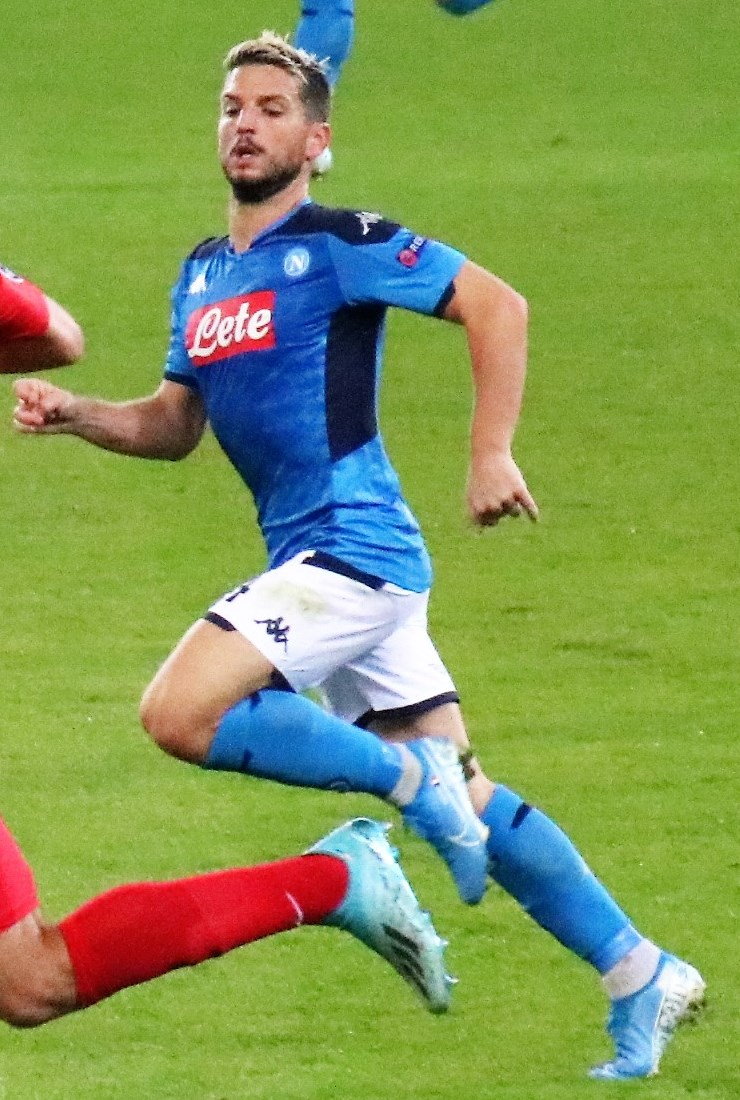
Dries Mertens is Napoli's all-time top goalscorer.

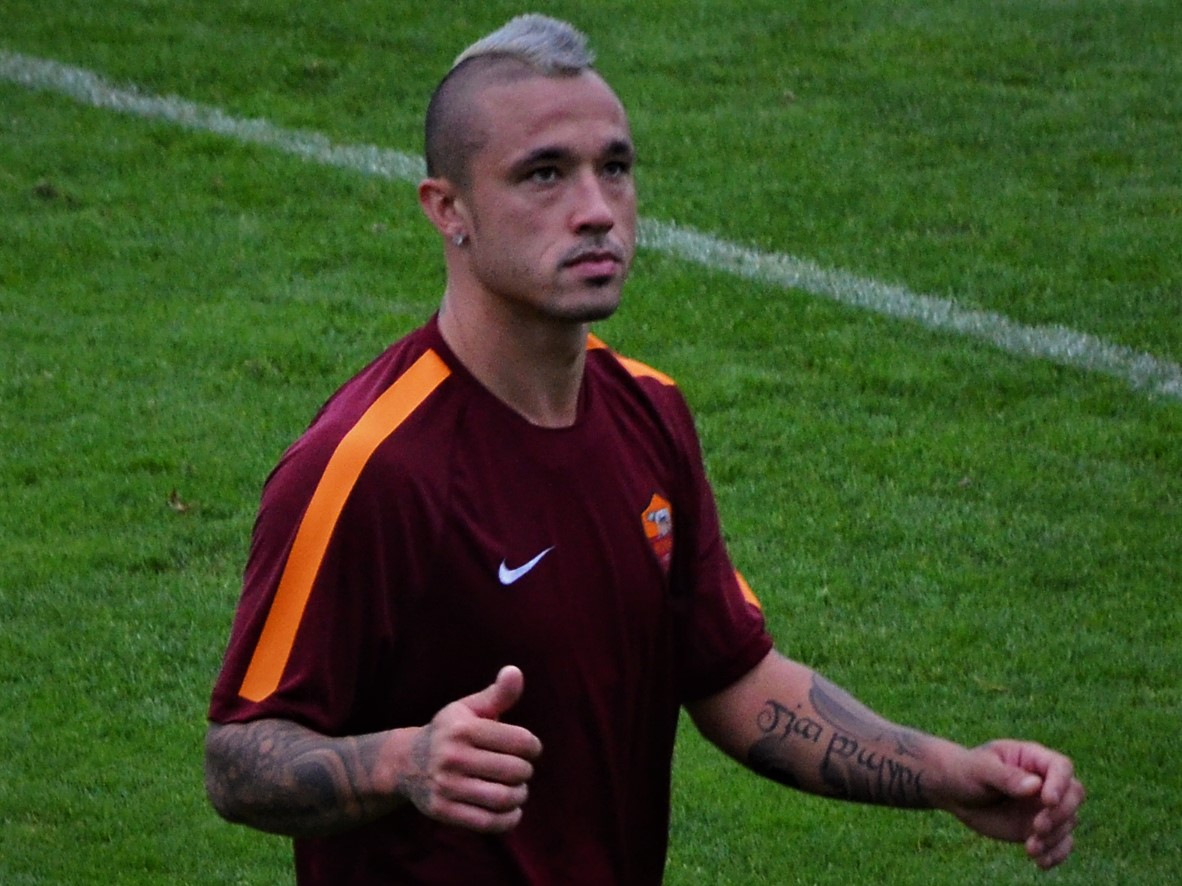
Radja Nainggolan training with Roma

- Walter Baseggio – Treviso – 2005–06
- Maxime Busi – Parma – 2020–21
- Timothy Castagne – Atalanta – 2017–20
- Luis Pedro Cavanda – Lazio – 2010–15
- Ludo Coeck – Inter – 1983–84
- Bertrand Crasson – Napoli – 1996–98
- **Kevin De Bruyne** – **Napoli** – 2025–
- **Charles De Ketelaere** – Milan, **Atalanta** – 2022–
- **Koni De Winter** – Empoli, Genoa, **Milan** – 2022–
- Stéphane Demol – Bologna – 1988–89
- Leander Dendoncker – Napoli – 2023–24
- Daan Dierckx – Parma – 2020–21
- Noë Dussenne – Crotone – 2016–18
- Daam Foulon – Benevento – 2020–21
- Régis Genaux – Udinese – 1996–2001
- Eric Gerets – Milan – 1983–84
- Jean-François Gillet – Bari, Bologna, Torino – 2000–01, 2009–13, 2014–15
- Georges Grün – Parma, Reggiana – 1990–94, 1996–97
- Daan Heymans – Venezia – 2021–22
- **Christian Kabasele** – **Udinese** – 2023–
- **Mandela Keita** – **Parma** – 2024–
- Sven Kums – Udinese – 2016–17
- Maxime Lestienne – Genoa – 2014–15
- **Fedde Leysen** – **Sassuolo** – 2026–
- Jordan Lukaku – Lazio – 2016–20
- Romelu Lukaku – Inter, Roma, Napoli – 2019–21, 2022–26
- **Samuel Mbangula** – Juventus, **Bologna** – 2024–25, 2026–
- Dries Mertens – Napoli – 2013–22
- Kevin Mirallas – Fiorentina – 2018–19
- **Diego Moreira** – **Milan** – 2026–
- Gaby Mudingayi – Lazio, Bologna, Inter, Cesena – 2005–15
- Radja Nainggolan – Cagliari, Roma, Inter – 2009–21
- **Cyril Ngonge** – Verona, Napoli, Torino, **Monza** – 2022–
- Joseph Nonge – Juventus – 2023–24
- Luís Oliveira – Cagliari, Fiorentina, Bologna – 1992–2001
- Stephane Omeonga – Genoa – 2017–19
- Loïs Openda – Juventus – 2025–26
- Divock Origi – Milan – 2022–23
- Daouda Peeters – Juventus – 2019–20
- Dennis Praet – Sampdoria, Torino – 2016–19, 2021–22
- Silvio Proto – Lazio – 2018–19
- **Alexis Saelemaekers** – **Milan**, Bologna, Roma – 2019–
- **Richie Sagrado** – **Venezia** – 2024–25, 2026–
- **Joël Schingtienne** – **Venezia** – 2024–25, 2026–
- Vincenzo Scifo – Inter, Torino – 1987–88, 1991–93
- Francis Severeyns – Pisa – 1988–89
- **Arthur Theate** – **Bologna** – 2021–22, 2026–
- Anthony Vanden Borre – Fiorentina, Genoa – 2007–09
- **Ignace Van Der Brempt** – Como – 2024–
- Jari Vandeputte – Cremonese – 2025–26
- René Vandereycken – Genoa – 1981–83
- Zinho Vanheusden – Genoa – 2021–22
- Thomas Vermaelen – Roma – 2016–17
- Patrick Vervoort – Ascoli – 1991–92
- Aster Vranckx – Milan, Sassuolo – 2022–23, 2025–26
- Johan Walem – Udinese, Parma – 1997–2001

=== Bosnia and Herzegovina ===
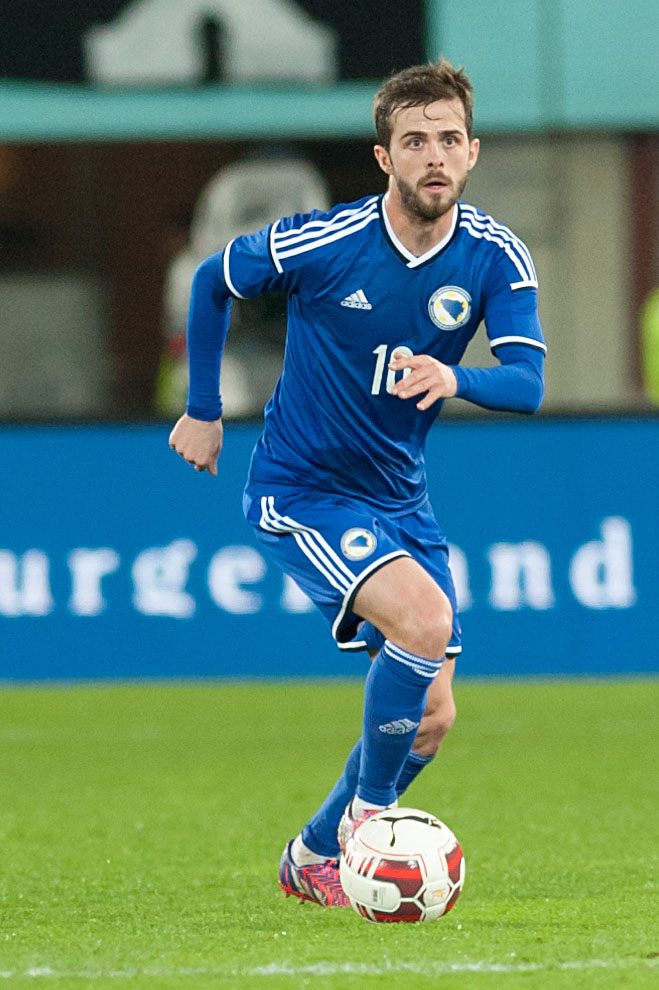
2016–17 Capocannoniere winner Edin Džeko (29 goals) and Miralem Pjanić
- **Kerim Alajbegović** – **Juventus** – 2026–
- Mustafa Arslanović – Ascoli – 1988–90 ( (Socialist Federal Republic of Yugoslavia) while active)
- Riad Bajić – Udinese – 2017–18
- Asmir Begović – Milan – 2019–20
- Milan Đurić – Cesena, Salernitana, Verona, Monza, Parma, Cremonese – 2014–15, 2021–26
- Edin Džeko – Roma, Inter, Fiorentina – 2015–23, 2025–26
- Amer Gojak – Torino – 2020–21
- Vinko Golob – Venezia – 1949–50 ( (Socialist Federal Republic of Yugoslavia) while active)
- Mato Jajalo – Siena, Palermo, Udinese – 2009–10, 2014–17, 2019–23
- Davor Jozić – Cesena – 1987–91 ( (Socialist Federal Republic of Yugoslavia) while active)
- **Sead Kolašinac** – **Atalanta** – 2023–
- Rade Krunić – Empoli, Milan – 2015–17, 2018–24
- Senad Lulić – Lazio – 2011–21
- Hrvoje Miličević – Pescara – 2016–17
- Tarik Muharemović – Sassuolo – 2025–26
- Vedin Musić – Como, Modena, Torino – 2002–04, 2006–07
- Zlatan Muslimović – Udinese, Messina, Parma, Atalanta – 2000–01, 2005–08
- Enis Nadarević – Genoa – 2012–13
- Daniel Pavlović – Frosinone, Sampdoria, Crotone – 2015–18
- Miralem Pjanić – Roma, Juventus – 2011–20
- Sanjin Prcić – Torino – 2015–16
- Hasan Salihamidžić – Juventus – 2007–11
- Haris Škoro – Torino – 1988–89, 1990–91 ( (Socialist Federal Republic of Yugoslavia) while active)
- Blaž Slišković – Pescara – 1987–88, 1992–93 ( (Socialist Federal Republic of Yugoslavia) while active)
- Ćazim Suljić – Crotone – 2016–17
- Toni Šunjić – Palermo – 2016–17
- Benjamin Tahirović – Roma – 2022–23
- Petar Zovko – Spezia – 2021–22
- Ervin Zukanović – Chievo, Sampdoria, Roma, Atalanta, Genoa, SPAL – 2014–20

=== Bulgaria ===
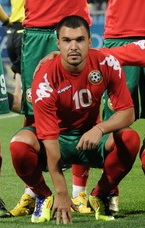
Valeri Bojinov, the youngest foreign player to make his debut in Serie A at the age of 15 and 11 months.

- **Valentin Antov** – Bologna, **Monza** – 2020–21, 2022–23, 2026–
- Valeri Bojinov – Lecce, Fiorentina, Parma – 2001–02, 2003–06, 2009–12
- Rosen Bozhinov – Pisa – 2025–26
- Ivaylo Chochev – Palermo – 2014–17
- Kiril Despodov – Cagliari – 2018–19, 2020–21
- Andrey Galabinov – Genoa, Spezia – 2017–18, 2020–21
- Petko Hristov – Spezia – 2021–23
- Nikolay Iliev – Bologna – 1989–91
- Hristo Stoichkov – Parma – 1995–96
- Aleksandar Tonev – Frosinone, Crotone – 2015–18

=== Croatia ===
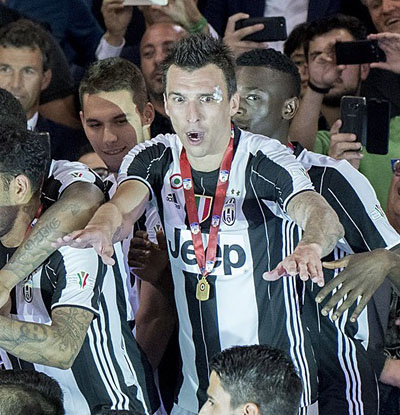
Mario Mandžukić, Croatian player appreciated with Juventus for his grit and determination.

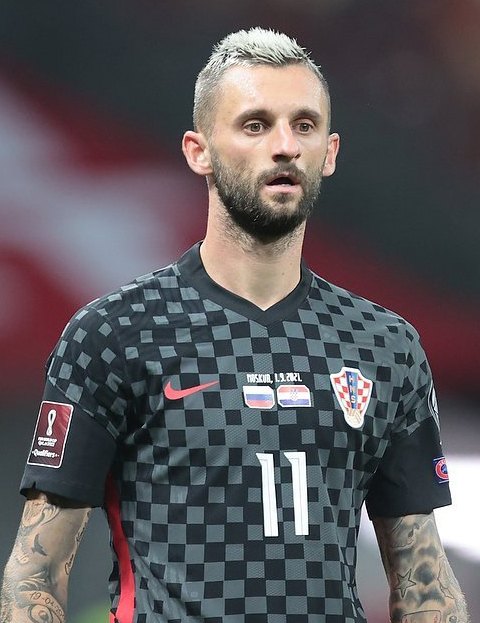
Marcelo Brozović made over 250 Serie A appearances for Inter Milan

- Aljoša Asanović – Napoli – 1997–98
- Milan Badelj – Fiorentina, Lazio, Genoa – 2014–22, 2023–25
- Ricardo Bagadur – Fiorentina – 2014–15
- Andrija Balić – Udinese – 2016–19
- Zoran Ban – Juventus – 1993–94
- **Toma Bašić** – Lazio, Salernitana, **Venezia** – 2021–24, 2025–
- Filip Benković – Udinese – 2021–22
- Kristijan Bistrović – Lecce – 2022–23
- Saša Bjelanović – Como, Chievo, Lecce, Ascoli, Torino – 2002–03, 2004–08
- Zvonimir Boban – Bari, Milan – 1991–2001 ( (Socialist Federal Republic of Yugoslavia) while active)
- Luka Bogdan – Salernitana – 2021–22
- Alen Bokšić – Lazio, Juventus – 1993–2000
- Domagoj Bradarić – Salernitana, Verona – 2022–26
- Filip Bradarić – Cagliari – 2018–19
- Elvis Brajković – Verona – 1996–97
- Josip Brekalo – Torino, Fiorentina – 2021–24
- Petar Brlek – Genoa – 2017–18
- Dražen Brnčić – Milan, Vicenza – 2000–01
- Marcelo Brozović – Inter – 2014–23
- Igor Bubnjić – Udinese, Carpi – 2013–16
- Ante Budimir – Sampdoria, Crotone – 2016–18
- Igor Budan – Venezia, Atalanta, Ascoli, Parma, Palermo, Cesena – 1999–2000, 2001–02, 2004–13
- **Duje Ćaleta-Car** – **Sassuolo** – 2026–
- Davor Čop – Empoli – 1987–88 ( (Socialist Federal Republic of Yugoslavia) while active)
- Duje Čop – Cagliari – 2014–15, 2017–18
- Ante Ćorić – Roma – 2018–19
- Mario Cvitanović – Verona, Venezia – 2000–02
- Damjan Đoković – Cesena – 2011–12
- Tomislav Erceg – Perugia – 1998–99
- Martin Erlić – Spezia, Sassuolo, Bologna – 2020–25
- **Bartol Franjić** – **Venezia** – 2026–
- **Matija Frigan** – **Parma** – 2026–
- Tomislav Gomelt – Crotone – 2020–21
- Robert Jarni – Bari, Torino, Juventus – 1991–92, 1993–95 ( (Socialist Federal Republic of Yugoslavia) while active)
- Ivan Javorčić – Brescia – 1997–98
- Tin Jedvaj – Roma – 2013–14
- Krunoslav Jurčić – Torino – 1999–2000
- Ivan Jurić – Genoa – 2007–10
- Nikola Kalinić – Fiorentina, Milan, Roma, Verona – 2015–18, 2019–22
- Veldin Karić – Torino – 1995–96
- Ivan Kelava – Udinese – 2013–14
- Dario Knežević – Livorno, Juventus – 2006–10
- Robert Kovač – Juventus – 2005–06
- Mateo Kovačić – Inter – 2012–15
- Miljenko Kovačić – Brescia – 1997–98
- **Sandro Kulenović** – **Torino** – 2025–
- Karlo Letica – SPAL, Sampdoria – 2019–21
- Marko Livaja – Cesena, Inter, Atalanta, Empoli – 2011–14, 2015–16
- Karlo Lulić – Frosinone – 2023–24
- Mario Mandžukić – Juventus, Milan – 2015–19, 2020–21
- Mirko Marić – Monza, Venezia – 2023–25
- Ivan Martić – Verona – 2014–15
- Frane Matošić – Bologna – 1942–43 ( (Independent State of Croatia) while active)
- Hrvoje Milić – Fiorentina – 2016–17
- Branimir Mlačić – Udinese – 2025–26
- **Luka Modrić** – **Milan** – 2025–
- Zvonko Monsider – Padova – 1949–50 ( (Socialist Federal Republic of Yugoslavia) while active)
- **Nikola Moro** – **Bologna** – 2022–
- Robert Murić – Pescara – 2016–17
- Marko Pajač – Cagliari, Empoli, Genoa – 2016–17, 2018–20
- Manuel Pamić – Chievo – 2013–14
- Ivor Pandur – Verona – 2020–22
- **Mario Pašalić** – Milan, **Atalanta** – 2016–17, 2018–
- Stipe Perica – Udinese, Frosinone – 2014–19
- Ivan Perišić – Inter – 2015–19, 2020–22
- Bruno Petković – Catania, Bologna, Verona – 2012–14, 2016–18
- Marko Pjaca – Juventus, Fiorentina, Genoa, Torino, Empoli – 2016–17, 2018–19, 2020–23
- **Marin Pongračić** – Lecce, **Fiorentina** – 2022–
- Josip Posavec – Palermo – 2015–17
- Nenad Pralija – Reggina – 1999–2000
- Franjo Prce – Lazio – 2016–17
- Josip Radošević – Napoli – 2013–15
- Milan Rapaić – Perugia, Ancona – 1996–97, 1998–2000, 2003–04
- Ante Rebić – Fiorentina, Verona, Milan, Lecce – 2013–14, 2015–16, 2019–23, 2024–25
- Marko Rog – Napoli, Cagliari – 2016–22
- Tomislav Rukavina – Venezia – 1999–2000, 2001–02
- Adrian Šemper – Chievo, Genoa, Pisa – 2018–19, 2021–22, 2025–26
- Anthony Šerić – Verona, Brescia, Parma, Lazio – 1999–2005
- Dario Šimić – Inter, Milan – 1998–2008
- Lorenco Šimić – SPAL – 2017–19
- Dario Smoje – Milan – 1997–98
- **Ivan Smolčić** – **Como** – 2024–
- Robert Špehar – Verona – 1999–2000
- Borna Sosa – Torino – 2024–25
- Darijo Srna – Cagliari – 2018–19
- Mario Stanić – Parma – 1996–2000
- Ivan Strinić – Napoli, Sampdoria – 2014–18
- **Petar Sučić** – **Inter** – 2025–
- Ivo Šuprina – Napoli – 1950–51 ( (Socialist Federal Republic of Yugoslavia) while active)
- Ivica Šurjak – Udinese – 1982–83 ( (Socialist Federal Republic of Yugoslavia) while active)
- Boško Šutalo – Atalanta, Verona – 2019–22
- Marin Šverko – Venezia – 2024–25
- Antonio Tikvić – Udinese – 2023–24
- Stjepan Tomas – Vicenza, Como – 2000–01, 2002–03
- Goran Tomić – Vicenza – 2000–01
- Igor Tudor – Juventus, Siena – 1998–2006
- Ivan Vargić – Lazio – 2016–17
- Goran Vlaović – Padova – 1994–96
- **Nikola Vlašić** – **Torino** – 2022–
- Šime Vrsaljko – Genoa, Sassuolo, Inter – 2013–16, 2018–19
- Davor Vugrinec – Lecce, Atalanta – 2000–03
- Bernard Vukas – Bologna – 1957–59 ( (Socialist Federal Republic of Yugoslavia) while active)
- Dragan Vukoja – Salernitana – 1998–99
- Ante Vukušić – Pescara – 2012–13
- Tonči Žilić – Verona – 1999–2000
- Dario Župarić – Pescara – 2016–17

=== Cyprus ===
- Grigoris Kastanos – Pescara, Juventus, Salernitana, Verona – 2016–17, 2018–19, 2021–26
- Zanos Savva – Torino – 2023–24

=== Czech Republic ===
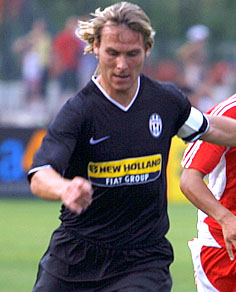
Pavel Nedvěd playing for Juventus in 2007, he is one of the best players in the history of the Turin team. He won the 2003 Ballon d'Or and he has been an important player also for the Sergio Cragnotti's Lazio

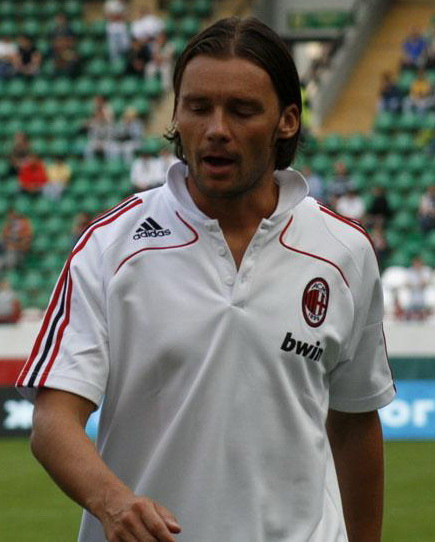
Marek Jankulovski

- Antonín Barák – Udinese, Lecce, Verona, Fiorentina – 2017–25
- Louis Buffon – Pisa – 2025–26
- Ondřej Čelůstka – Palermo – 2009–10
- Daniel Fila – Venezia – 2024–25
- Zdeněk Grygera – Juventus – 2007–11
- Josef Hušbauer – Cagliari – 2014–15
- Jakub Jankto – Udinese, Sampdoria, Cagliari – 2016–21, 2023–24
- Marek Jankulovski – Napoli, Udinese, Milan – 2000–01, 2002–11
- Lukáš Jarolím – Siena – 2007–10
- Martin Jiránek – Reggina – 2000–01, 2002–04
- Josef Kaiml – Triestina – 1951–52 ( (Czechoslovakia) while active)
- Václav Koloušek – Salernitana – 1998–99
- Libor Kozák – Lazio – 2008–09, 2010–13
- Ladislav Krejčí – Bologna – 2016–20
- Luboš Kubík – Fiorentina – 1989–91 ( (Czechoslovakia) while active)
- Martin Lejsal – Reggina – 2002–04
- Mario Lička – Livorno – 2004–05
- David Limberský – Modena – 2003–04
- Aleš Matějů – Brescia, Venezia – 2019–20, 2021–22
- Pavel Nedvěd – Lazio, Juventus – 1996–2006, 2007–09
- Jaroslav Plašil – Catania – 2013–14
- Karel Poborský – Lazio – 2000–02
- Daniel Pudil – Cesena – 2011–12
- Michael Rabušic – Verona – 2013–14
- Tomáš Řepka – Fiorentina – 1998–2002
- David Rozehnal – Lazio – 2007–09
- Patrik Schick – Sampdoria, Roma – 2016–19
- Stefan Simić – Crotone – 2017–18
- Tomáš Sivok – Udinese – 2006–08
- Tomáš Skuhravý – Genoa – 1990–95 ( (Czechoslovakia) while active)
- Pavel Srníček – Brescia – 2000–03
- Tomáš Ujfaluši – Fiorentina – 2004–08
- Kamil Vacek – Chievo – 2011–13
- **Martin Vitík** – **Bologna** – 2025–
- Lukáš Vorlický – Atalanta – 2022–23
- Čestmír Vycpálek – Juventus, Palermo – 1946–47, 1948–52 ( (Czechoslovakia) while active)
- Matěj Vydra – Udinese – 2010–11
- Tomáš Zápotočný – Udinese – 2006–08
- David Zima – Torino – 2021–24
- Jaromír Zmrhal – Brescia – 2019–20

=== Denmark ===
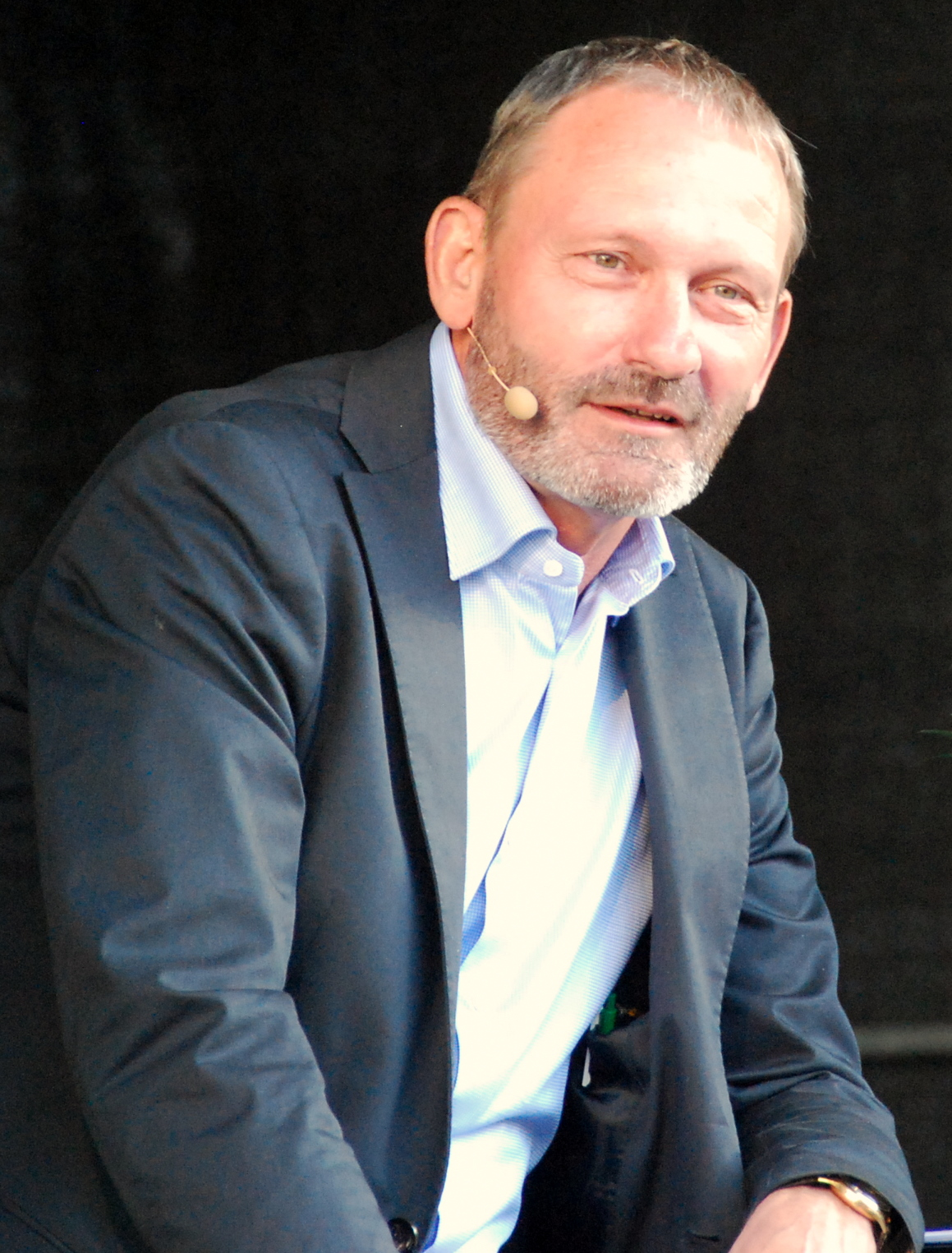
Preben Elkjær in 2011; he played a vital role in Verona's scudetto win in 1985

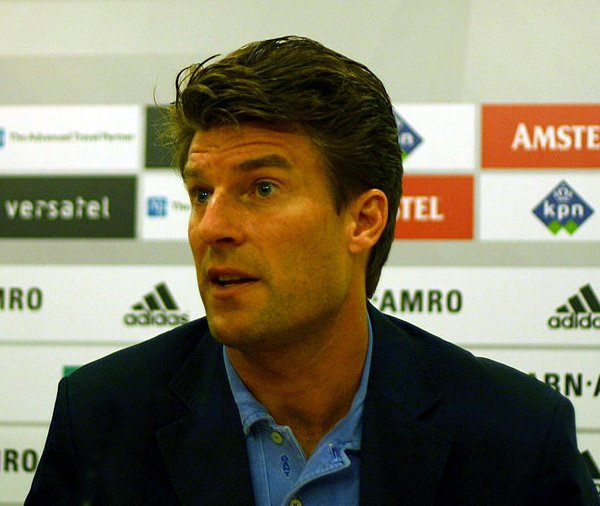
Michael Laudrup in 2006

- Oliver Abildgaard – Verona, Como – 2022–23, 2024–25
- Joachim Andersen – Sampdoria – 2017–19
- Magnus Kofod Andersen – Venezia – 2024–25
- Peter Ankersen – Genoa – 2019–20
- Julius Beck – Spezia – 2022–23
- Nicklas Bendtner – Juventus – 2012–13
- Nils Bennike – Spal, Genoa – 1951–54
- Klaus Berggreen – Pisa, Roma, Torino – 1982–84, 1985–88
- Martin Bergvold – Livorno – 2006–08, 2009–10
- Philip Billing – Napoli – 2024–25
- Morten Bisgaard – Udinese – 1998–2001
- Helge Bronée – Palermo, Roma, Juventus, Novara – 1950–56
- Kurt Christensen – Atalanta, Lazio, Catania – 1961–66
- **Oliver Christensen** – **Fiorentina** – 2023–24, 2025–
- Anders Christiansen – Chievo – 2014–15
- Hans Colberg – Lucchese – 1950–52
- Jeppe Corfitzen – Lecce – 2023–24
- Andreas Cornelius – Atalanta, Parma – 2017–18, 2019–21
- Mikkel Damsgaard – Sampdoria – 2020–22
- Patrick Dorgu – Lecce – 2023–25
- Riza Durmisi – Lazio – 2018–19
- Preben Elkjær – Verona – 1984–88
- Christian Eriksen – Inter – 2019–21
- Kai Frandsen – Lucchese – 1951–52
- **Morten Frendrup** – **Genoa** – 2021–22, 2023–
- Martin Frese – Verona – 2024–26
- Allan Gaarde – Udinese – 2000–01
- Albert Grønbæk – Genoa – 2025–26
- Christian Gytkjær – Monza, Venezia – 2022–23, 2024–25
- John Hansen – Juventus, Lazio – 1948–55
- Karl Aage Hansen – Atalanta, Juventus, Sampdoria, Catania – 1949–55
- Svend Jørgen Hansen – Atalanta, Pro Patria – 1950–53
- Thomas Helveg – Udinese, Milan, Inter – 1993–94, 1995–2004
- Morten Hjulmand – Lecce – 2022–23
- Malthe Højholt – Pisa – 2025–26
- **Rasmus Højlund** – Atalanta, **Napoli** – 2022–23, 2025–
- **Gustav Isaksen** – **Lazio** – 2023–
- Daniel Jensen – Novara – 2011–12
- Ivan Jensen – Bologna – 1949–56
- Per Jensen – Triestina – 1954–55
- Martin Jørgensen – Udinese, Fiorentina – 1997–2010
- Christian Keller – Lazio – 2005–06
- Simon Kjær – Palermo, Roma, Atalanta, Milan – 2008–10, 2011–12, 2019–24
- Peter Knudsen – Bari – 1998–99
- Rasmus Kristensen – Roma – 2023–24
- **Thomas Thiesson Kristensen** – **Udinese** – 2023–
- Victor Kristiansen – Bologna – 2023–24
- Per Krøldrup – Udinese, Fiorentina, Pescara – 2001–11, 2012–13
- Henrik Larsen – Pisa – 1990–91
- Brian Laudrup – Fiorentina, Milan – 1992–94
- Michael Laudrup – Lazio, Juventus – 1983–89
- Martin Laursen – Verona, Milan – 1999–2004
- Lukas Lerager – Genoa – 2018–21
- Jesper Lindström – Napoli – 2023–24
- Christian Lønstrup – Cagliari – 1996–97
- Michael Madsen – Bari – 1998–2001
- Joakim Mæhle – Atalanta – 2020–23
- Simon Makienok – Palermo – 2014–15
- Henrik Meister – Pisa – 2025–26
- Leif Mortensen – Udinese – 1961–62
- Victor Nelsson – Roma, Verona – 2024–26
- Flemming Nielsen – Atalanta – 1961–64
- Harald Nielsen – Bologna, Inter, Napoli, Sampdoria – 1961–70
- Matti Lund Nielsen – Pescara – 2012–13
- Nicki Bille Nielsen – Reggina – 2006–07
- Christian Nørgaard – Fiorentina – 2018–19
- Marc Nygaard – Brescia – 2004–05
- **Jens Odgaard** – Sassuolo, **Bologna** – 2018–19, 2023–
- Dion Ørnvold – Spal – 1951–52
- **Sebastian Otoa** – **Genoa** – 2024–
- Axel Pilmark – Bologna – 1950–59
- Johannes Pløger – Juventus, Novara, Torino, Udinese – 1948–54
- Christian Poulsen – Juventus – 2008–10
- Simon Poulsen – Sampdoria – 2012–13
- Karl Aage Præst – Juventus, Lazio – 1949–57
- **Oliver Provstgaard** – **Lazio** – 2024–
- Jacob Rasmussen – Empoli – 2018–19
- Poul Aage Rasmussen – Atalanta – 1952–56
- Lasse Schöne – Genoa – 2019–20
- John Sivebæk – Pescara – 1992–93
- **Laurs Skjellerup** – **Sassuolo** – 2025–
- Søren Skov – Avellino – 1982–83
- Andreas Skov Olsen – Bologna – 2019–22
- Tobias Slotsager – Verona – 2025–26
- Erling Sørensen – Udinese, Triestina – 1950–55
- Frederik Sørensen – Juventus, Bologna, Verona – 2010–15
- Jørgen Leschly Sørensen – Atalanta, Milan – 1949–55
- Oliver Sørensen – Parma – 2025–26
- Kris Stadsgaard – Reggina – 2007–08
- Jens Stryger Larsen – Udinese – 2017–22
- Casper Tengstedt – Verona – 2024–25
- Thomas Thorninger – Udinese – 2001–02
- Jon Dahl Tomasson – Milan – 2002–05
- Mike Tullberg – Reggina – 2007–08
- Magnus Warming – Torino – 2021–22
- Niki Zimling – Udinese – 2008–10

=== England ===
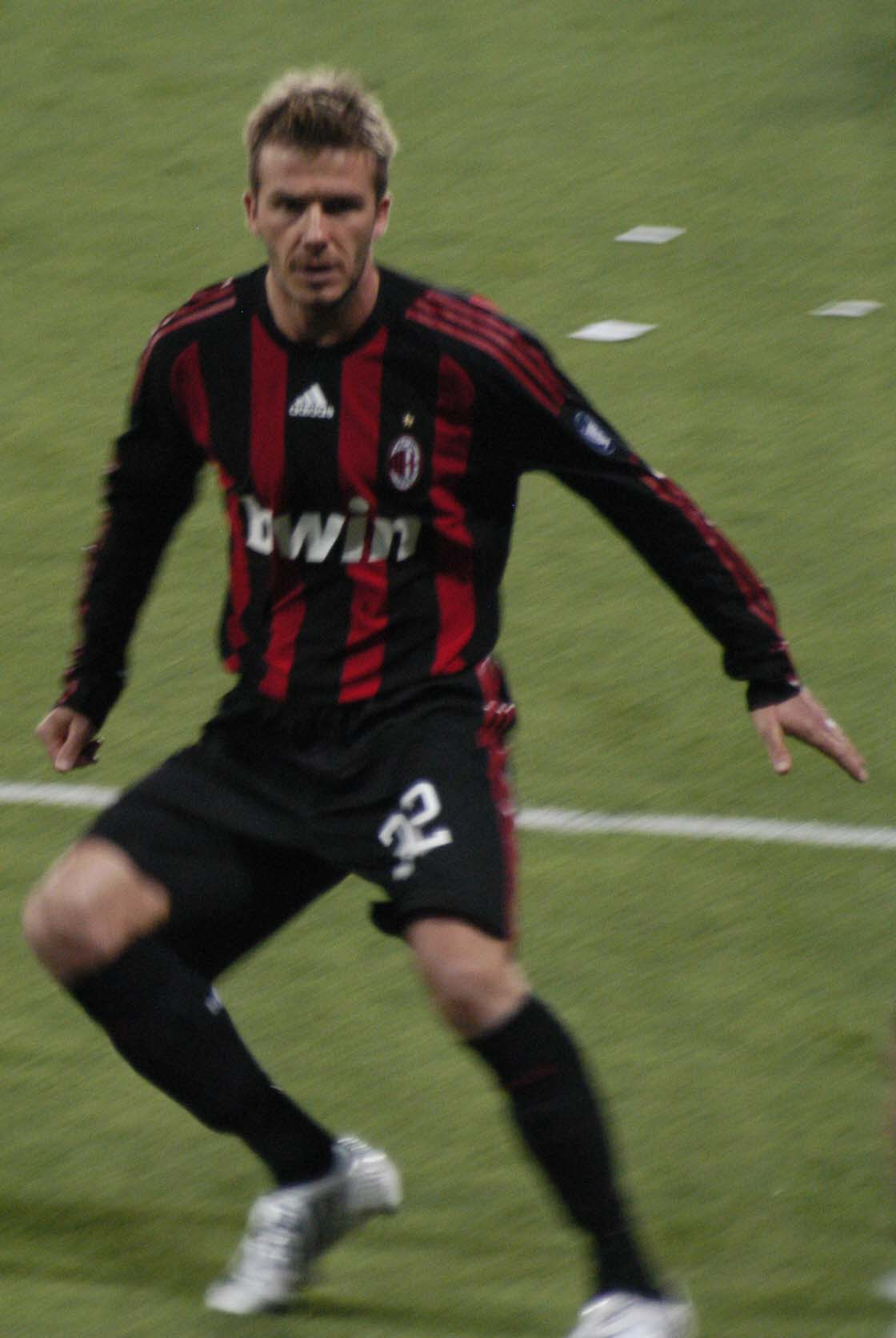
David Beckham playing for AC Milan in 2009

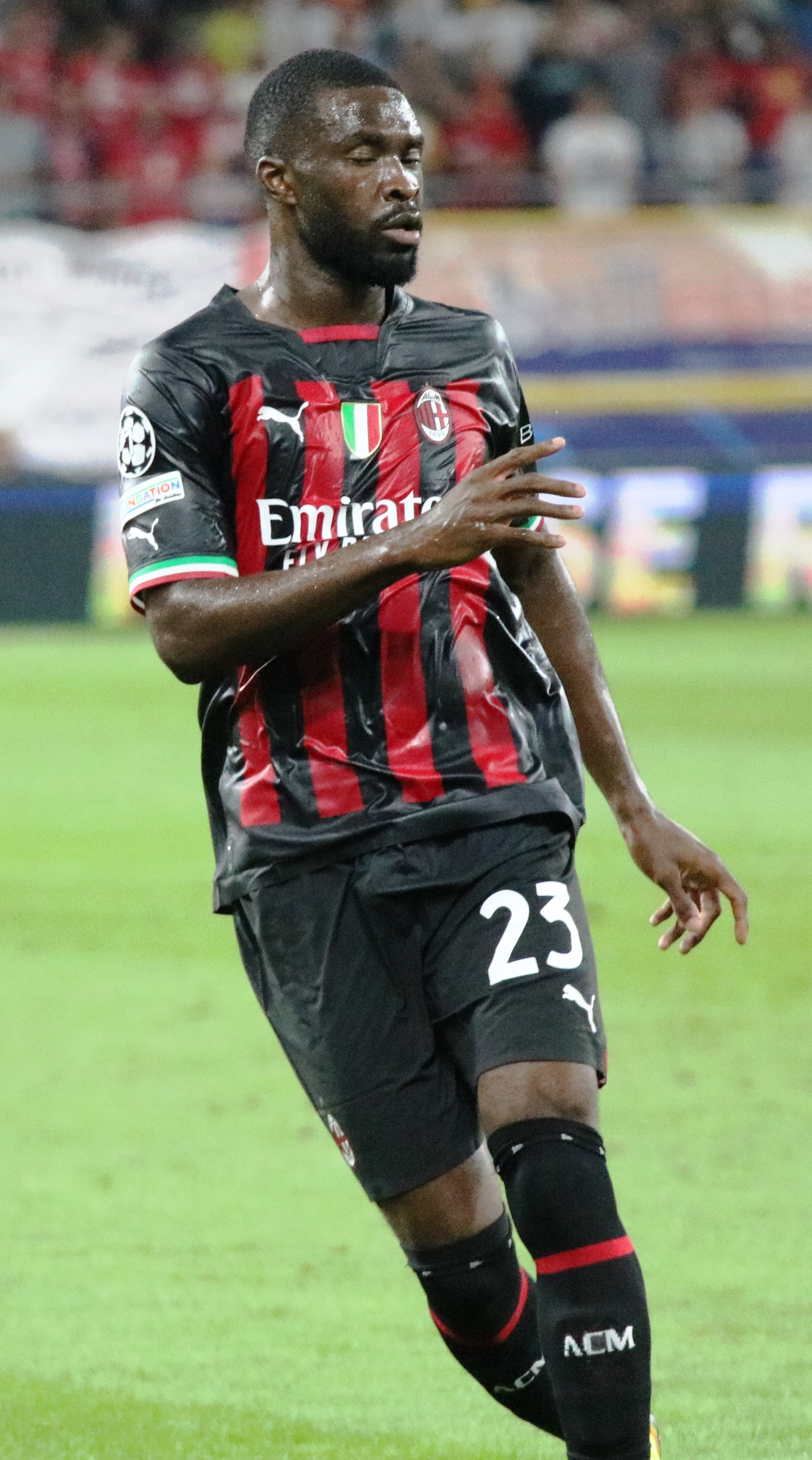
Fikayo Tomori won the scudetto with AC Milan in 2021–22

- Tammy Abraham – Roma, Milan – 2021–25
- Charles Adcock – Padova, Triestina – 1948–50
- Dele Alli – Como – 2024–25
- Tino Anjorin – Empoli, Torino – 2024–26
- Joe Baker – Torino – 1961–62
- David Beckham – Milan – 2008–10
- Luther Blissett – Milan – 1983–84
- Jay Bothroyd – Perugia – 2003–04
- Franz Carr – Reggiana – 1996–97
- Nathaniel Chalobah – Napoli – 2015–16
- **Trevoh Chalobah** – **Como** – 2026–
- Ashley Cole – Roma – 2014–15
- Gordon Cowans – Bari – 1985–86
- **Keinan Davis** – **Udinese** – 2023–
- Danny Dichio – Lecce – 1997–98
- Paul Elliott – Pisa – 1987–89
- **Omari Forson** – **Monza** – 2024–25, 2026–
- Trevor Francis – Sampdoria, Atalanta – 1982–87
- Paul Gascoigne – Lazio – 1992–95
- Ben Godfrey – Atalanta – 2024–25
- Jimmy Greaves – Milan – 1961–62
- Jack Harrison – Fiorentina – 2025–26
- Joe Hart – Torino – 2016–17
- Mark Hateley – Milan – 1984–87
- Gerry Hitchens – Inter, Torino, Atalanta, Cagliari – 1961–69
- **Omari Hutchinson** – **Milan** – 2026–
- Samuel Iling-Junior – Juventus, Bologna, Pisa – 2022–26
- Paul Ince – Inter – 1995–97
- **Curtis Jones** – **Inter** – 2026–
- William Jordan – Juventus – 1948–49
- **Lloyd Kelly** – **Juventus** – 2024–
- **Ruben Loftus-Cheek** – **Milan** – 2023–
- Ainsley Maitland-Niles – Roma – 2021–22
- Anthony Marchi – Vicenza, Torino – 1957–59
- Brooke Norton-Cuffy – Genoa – 2024–27
- **Justin Oboavwoduo** – **Juventus** – 2026–
- Daniel Oyegoke – Verona – 2024–26
- David Platt – Bari, Juventus, Sampdoria – 1991–95
- Micah Richards – Fiorentina – 2014–15
- Paul Rideout – Bari – 1985–86
- **Jay Robinson** – **Monza** – 2026–
- **Jonathan Rowe** – **Bologna**, **Atalanta** – 2025–
- Lee Sharpe – Sampdoria – 1998–99
- Chris Smalling – Roma – 2019–24
- **Djed Spence** – Genoa, **Inter** – 2023–24, 2026–
- **John Stones** – **Inter** – 2026–
- **Fikayo Tomori** – **Milan** – 2020–
- Jamie Vardy – Cremonese – 2025–26
- Des Walker – Sampdoria – 1992–93
- Kyle Walker – Milan – 2024–25
- Ray Wilkins – Milan – 1984–87
- Ben Wilmot – Udinese – 2018–19
- **Harry Winks** – Sampdoria, **Cagliari** – 2022–23, 2026–
- Ashley Young – Inter – 2019–21

=== Estonia ===
- Ragnar Klavan – Cagliari – 2018–21
- Georgi Tunjov – SPAL – 2019–20

=== Faroe Islands ===
- Andrias Edmundsson – Verona – 2025–26

=== Finland ===
- Mika Aaltonen – Bologna – 1988–89
- Alexei Eremenko – Lecce – 2004–06
- Roman Eremenko – Udinese, Siena – 2006–08
- Përparim Hetemaj – Brescia, Chievo, Benevento – 2010–19, 2020–21
- Anssi Jaakkola – Siena – 2007–08
- Jesse Joronen – Brescia, Venezia – 2019–20, 2024–25
- Mika Lehkosuo – Perugia – 1998–99
- Niki Mäenpää – Venezia – 2021–22
- Niklas Moisander – Sampdoria – 2015–16
- Joel Pohjanpalo – Venezia – 2024–25
- Niklas Pyyhtiä – Bologna – 2021–23
- Roope Riski – Cesena – 2010–11
- Simon Skrabb – Brescia – 2019–20
- Sauli Väisänen – SPAL – 2017–18
- Jani Virtanen – Udinese – 2006–07

=== Georgia (Georgia (country)) ===
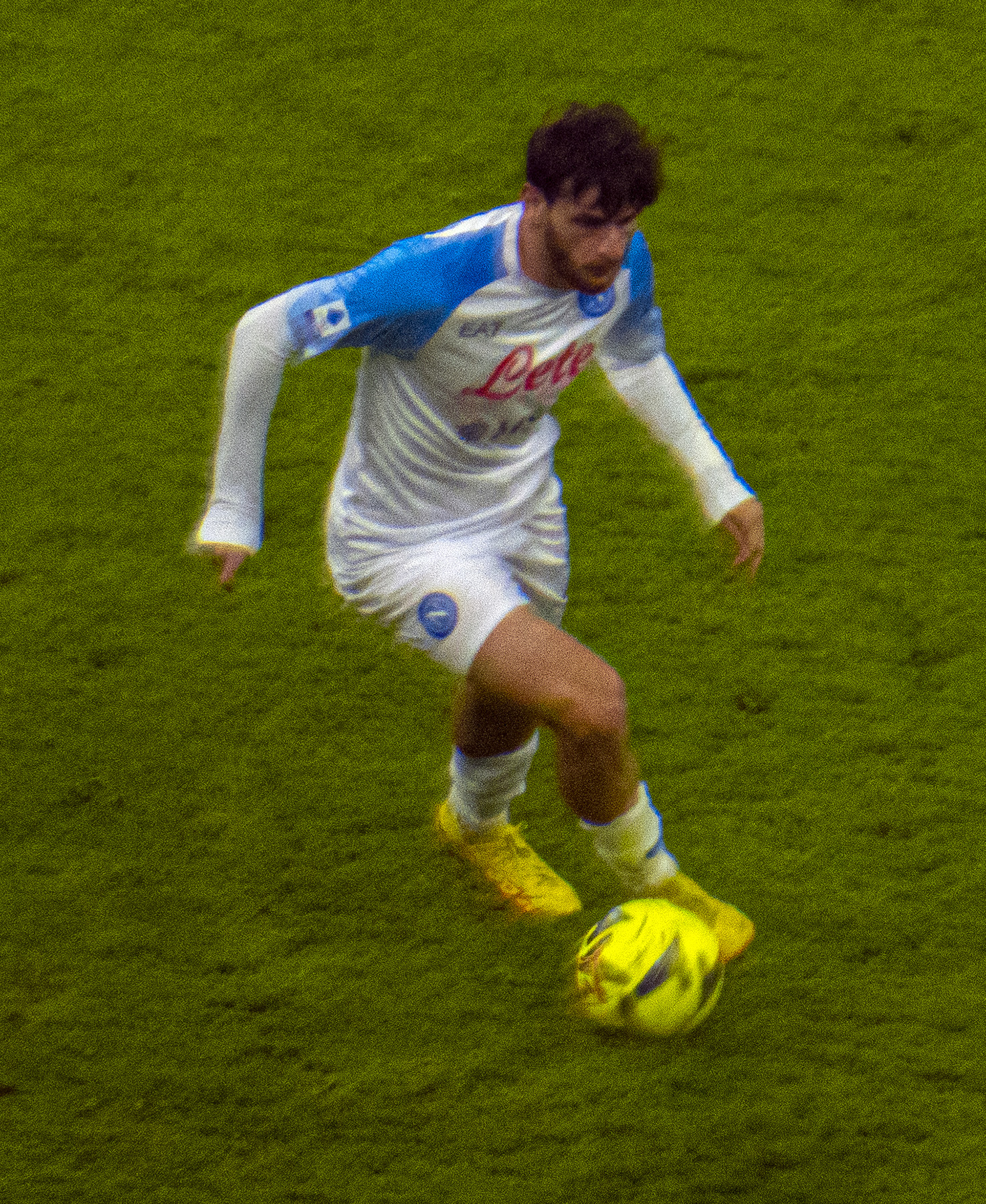
Khvicha Kvaratskhelia

- **Giorgi Chakvetadze** – **Udinese** – 2026–
- **Saba Goglichidze** – Empoli, Udinese, **Monza** – 2024–
- Kakha Kaladze – Milan, Genoa – 2000–12
- Khvicha Kvaratskhelia – Napoli – 2022–25
- **Giorgi Kvernadze** – **Frosinone** – 2023–24, 2026–
- Luka Lochoshvili – Cremonese – 2022–23
- Dachi Lordkipanidze – Cremonese – 2025–26
- Levan Mchedlidze – Palermo, Empoli – 2008–10, 2014–17, 2018–19
- Saba Sazonov – Torino – 2023–25

=== Germany ===
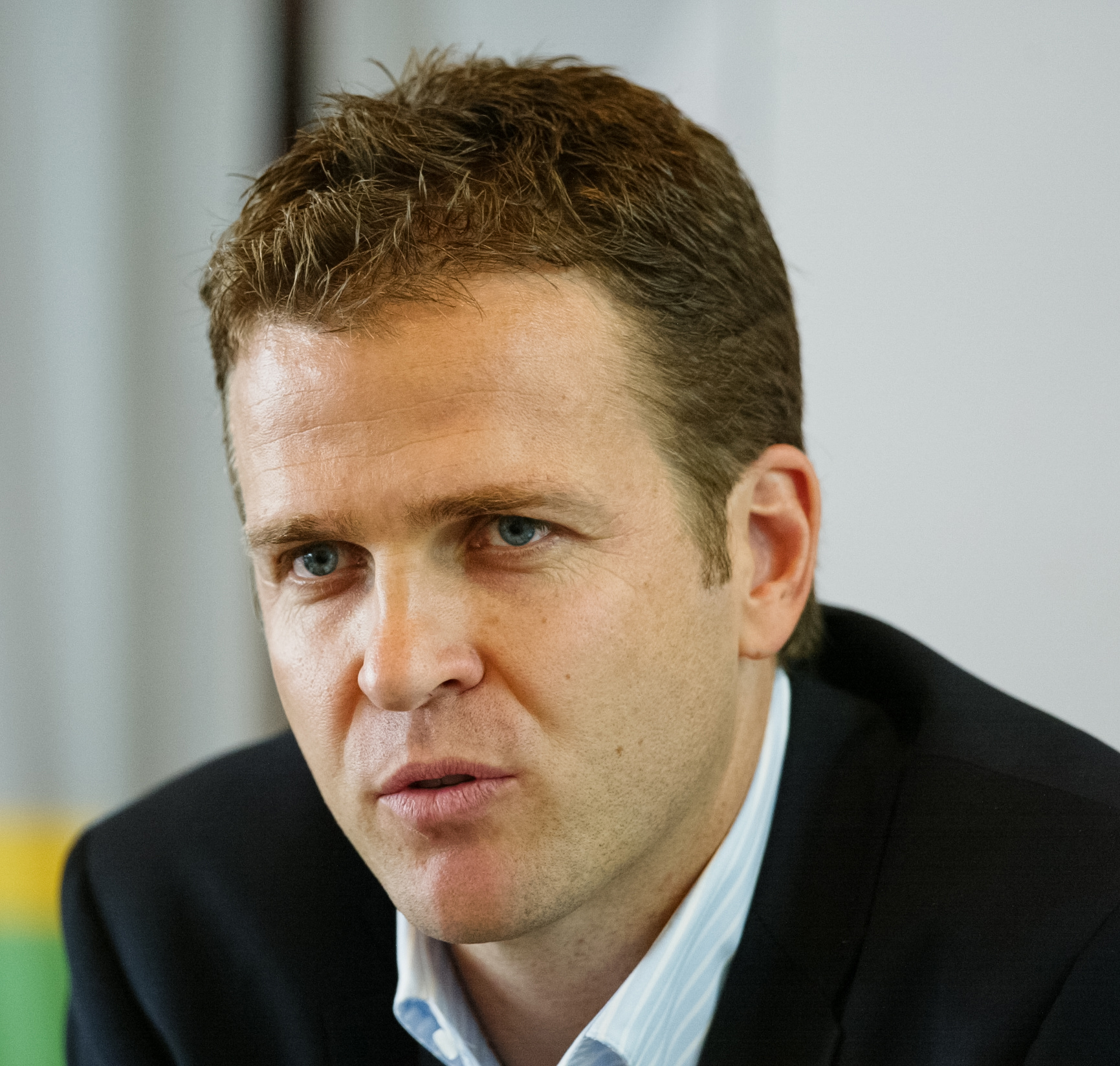
Oliver Bierhoff scored 112 goals in Serie A

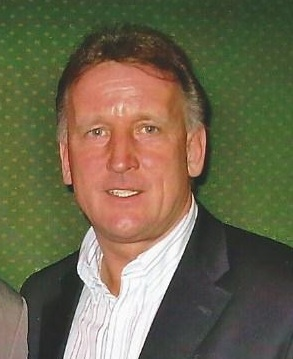
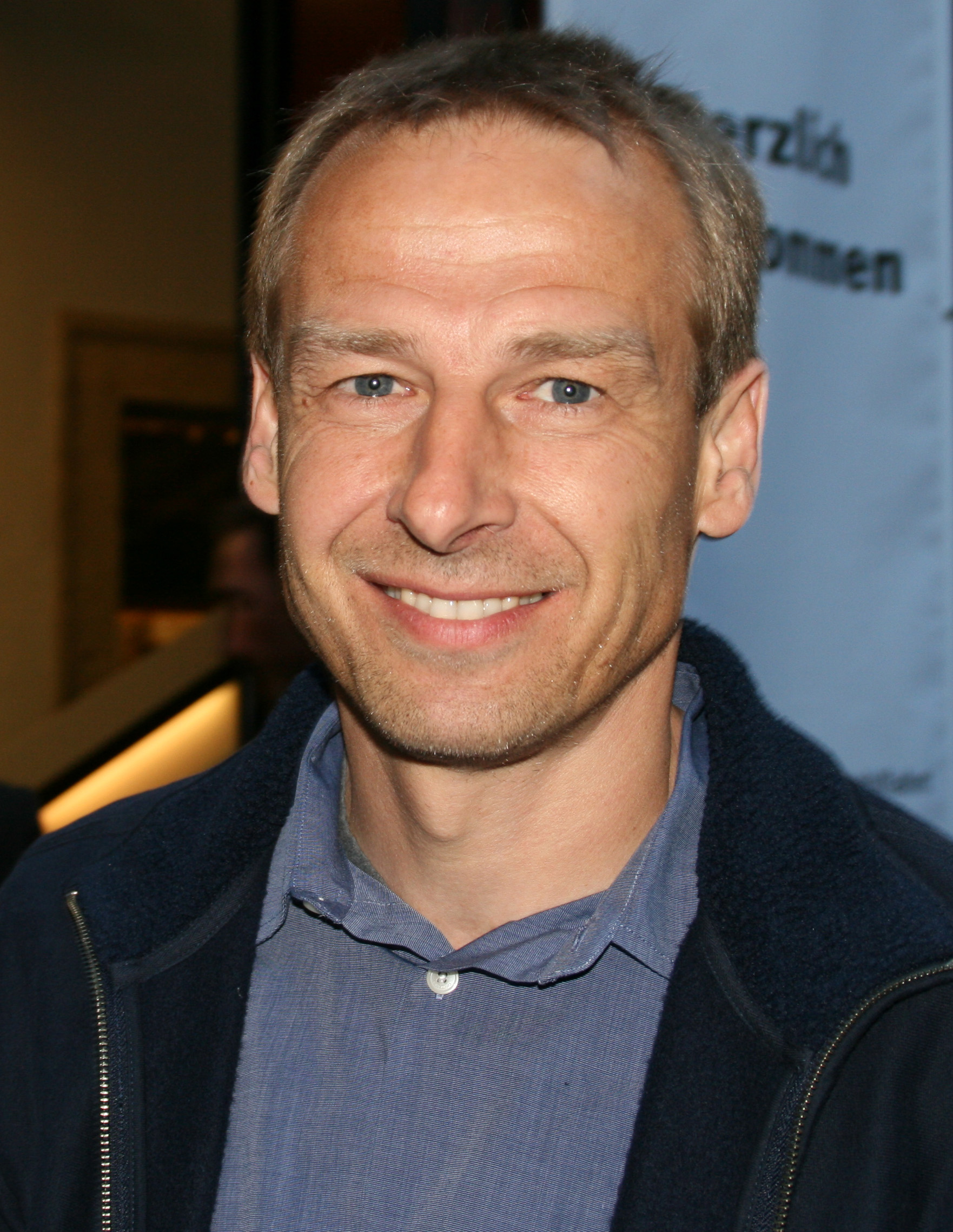
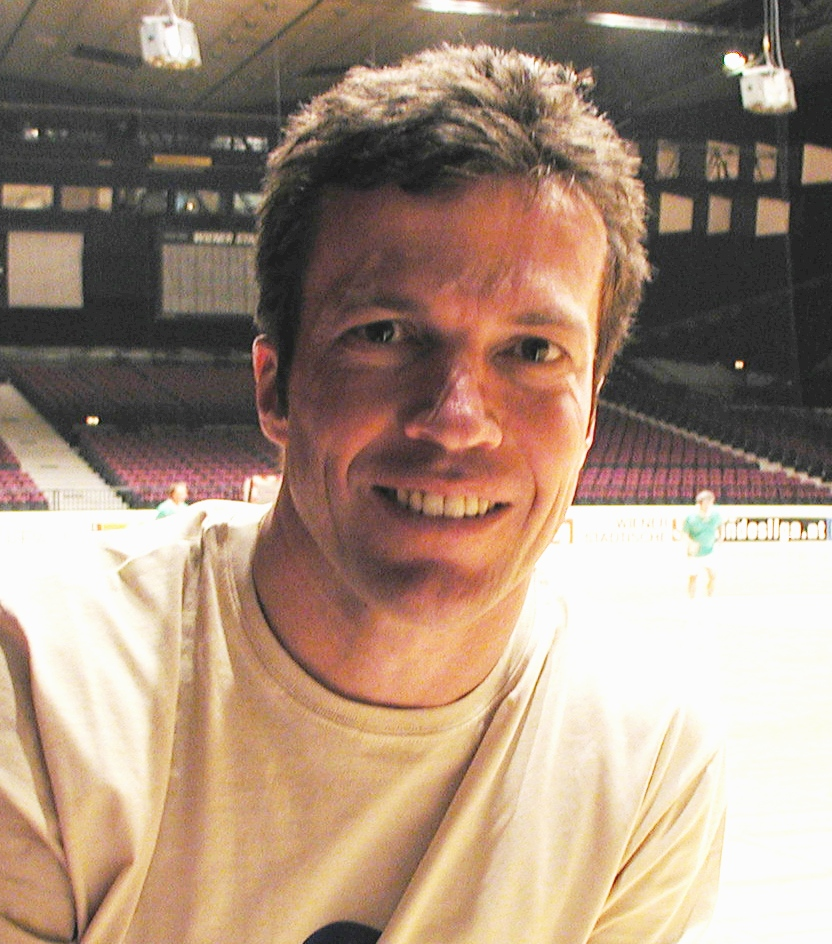
Andreas Brehme, Jürgen Klinsmann, Lothar Matthäus have been extremely important for Inter

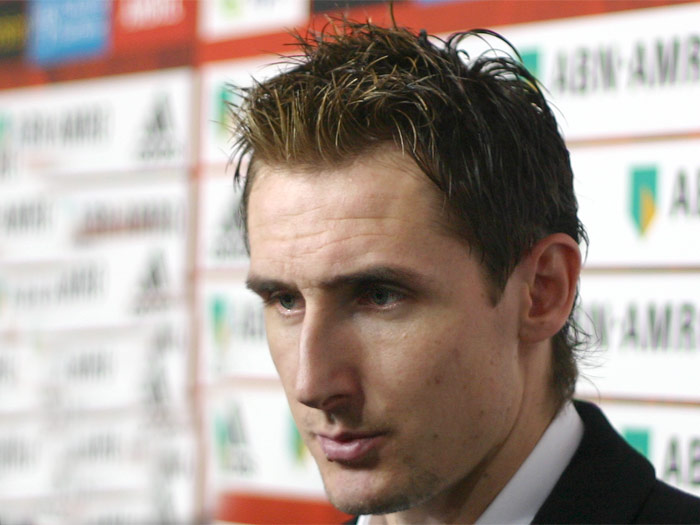
Miroslav Klose

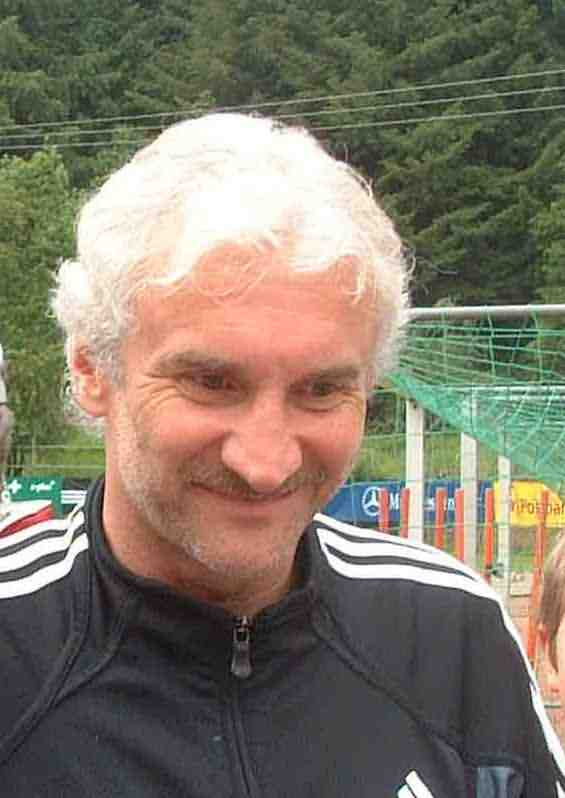
Rudi Völler

- Nadiem Amiri – Genoa – 2021–22
- Tolgay Arslan – Udinese – 2020–23
- Dietmar Beiersdorfer – Reggiana – 1996–97
- **Armel Bella-Kotchap** – Verona, **Venezia** – 2025–
- Thomas Berthold – Verona, Roma – 1987–91
- Oliver Bierhoff – Ascoli, Udinese, Milan, Chievo – 1991–92, 1995–2001, 2002–03
- Manfred Binz – Brescia – 1997–98
- **Yann Aurel Bisseck** – **Inter** – 2023–
- Jérôme Boateng – Salernitana – 2023–24
- Andreas Brehme – Inter – 1988–92
- Hans-Peter Briegel – Verona, Sampdoria – 1984–88
- Albert Brülls – Modena, Brescia – 1962–64, 1965–68
- Horst Buhtz – Torino – 1952–56
- Emre Can – Juventus – 2018–20
- Jeff Chabot – Sampdoria, Spezia – 2019–22
- Lennart Czyborra – Atalanta, Genoa – 2019–21
- Marvin Compper – Fiorentina – 2012–14
- Diego Demme – Napoli – 2019–24
- Thomas Doll – Lazio, Bari – 1991–94, 1997–98
- Stefan Effenberg – Fiorentina – 1992–93
- Yannik Engelhardt – Como – 2024–25
- Niclas Füllkrug – Milan – 2025–26
- Gianluca Gaudino – Chievo – 2017–18
- Rolf Geiger – Mantova – 1962–63
- Giuseppe Gemiti – Udinese, Chievo, Novara, Livorno – 2002–04, 2005–06, 2011–12, 2013–14
- Mario Gómez – Fiorentina – 2013–15
- Robin Gosens – Atalanta, Inter, Fiorentina – 2017–23, 2024–26
- André Gumprecht – Lecce – 1993–94
- Sinan Gümüş – Genoa – 2019–20
- Koray Günter – Genoa, Verona, Sampdoria – 2018–23
- Helmut Haller – Bologna, Juventus – 1962–73
- Thomas Häßler – Juventus, Roma – 1990–94
- Jörg Heinrich – Fiorentina – 1998–2000
- Thomas Hitzlsperger – Lazio – 2009–10
- Benedikt Höwedes – Juventus – 2017–18
- Mats Hummels – Roma – 2024–25
- Arijon Ibrahimović – Frosinone, Lazio– 2023–25
- Carsten Jancker – Udinese – 2002–04
- Ludwig Janda – Fiorentina, Novara – 1949–54
- **Marc Oliver Kempf** – **Como** – 2024–
- Sami Khedira – Juventus – 2015–20
- Jürgen Klinsmann – Inter, Sampdoria – 1989–92, 1997–98
- Miroslav Klose – Lazio – 2011–16
- Jürgen Kohler – Juventus – 1991–95
- Rudolf Kölbl – Padova, Genoa – 1961–62, 1964–65
- Oliver Kragl – Frosinone, Crotone – 2015–16, 2017–18
- **Nicolas Kühn** – **Como** – 2025–
- **Lion Lauberbach** – **Venezia** – 2026–
- Jens Lehmann – Milan – 1998–99
- Moritz Leitner – Lazio – 2016–17
- Lothar Matthäus – Inter – 1988–92
- Andreas Möller – Juventus – 1992–94
- Hansi Müller – Inter, Como – 1982–85
- Shkodran Mustafi – Sampdoria – 2012–14
- Herbert Neumann – Udinese, Bologna – 1980–82
- Savio Nsereko – Bologna – 2009–10
- David Odogu – Milan – 2025–26
- Vincenzo Palumbo – Empoli – 1998–99
- Lukas Podolski – Inter – 2014–15
- Gerhard Poschner – Venezia – 1998–99
- Stefan Reuter – Juventus – 1991–92
- Karl-Heinz Riedle – Lazio – 1990–93
- Antonio Rüdiger – Roma – 2015–17
- Karl-Heinz Rummenigge – Inter – 1984–87
- Matthias Sammer – Inter – 1992–93
- Karl-Heinz Schnellinger – Mantova, Roma, Milan – 1963–74
- Jürgen Schütz – Roma, Messina, Torino, Brescia – 1963–68
- Suat Serdar – Verona – 2023–26
- **Jamil Siebert** – **Lecce** – 2025–
- Karl-Heinz Spikofski – Catania – 1954–55
- Horst Szymaniak – Catania, Inter, Varese – 1961–65
- Malick Thiaw – Milan – 2022–25
- Jeremy Toljan – Sassuolo – 2019–24
- **Idrissa Touré** – Pisa – 2025–
- Rudi Völler – Roma – 1987–92
- Herbert Waas – Bologna – 1989–91
- Erwin Waldner – Spal – 1961–63
- **Nick Woltemade** – **Juventus** – 2026–
- Amin Younes – Napoli – 2018–20
- Kurt Zaro – Triestina – 1955–56
- Christian Ziege – Milan – 1997–99

=== Greece ===
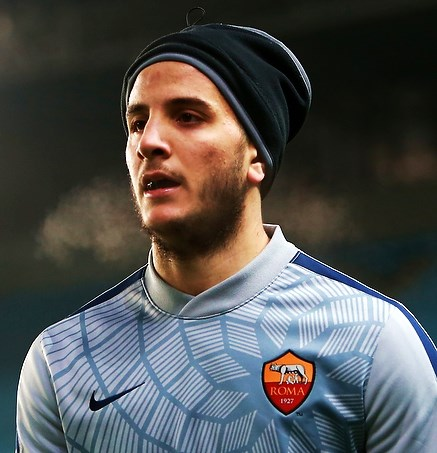
Kostas Manolas playing for Roma

- Nikos Anastopoulos – Avellino – 1987–88
- Lampros Choutos – Roma, Atalanta, Reggina, Inter – 1995–96, 1999–2000, 2004–07
- Lazaros Christodoulopoulos – Bologna, Verona, Sampdoria – 2012–16
- Traianos Dellas – Perugia, Roma – 2001–05
- **Anastasios Douvikas** – **Como** – 2024–
- Dimitrios Eleftheropoulos – Messina, Ascoli, Siena – 2004–05, 2006–09
- Giannis Fetfatzidis – Genoa, Chievo – 2013–15
- Savvas Gentsoglou – Sampdoria – 2013–14
- Grigorios Georgatos – Inter – 1999–2000, 2001–02
- Panagiotis Gonias – Messina – 2004–05
- Pantelis Hatzidiakos – Cagliari – 2023–24
- José Holebas – Roma – 2014–15
- Giorgos Karagounis – Inter – 2003–05
- Orestis Karnezis – Udinese, Napoli – 2014–17, 2018–19
- Fanis Katergiannakis – Cagliari – 2004–05
- Dimitrios Keramitsis – Roma – 2021–22
- Panagiotis Kone – Brescia, Bologna, Udinese, Fiorentina – 2010–17
- **Konstantinos Koulierakis** – **Roma** – 2026–
- Christos Kourfalidis – Cagliari – 2021–22
- Giorgos Kyriakopoulos – Sassuolo, Bologna, Monza – 2019–25
- Apostolos Liolidis – Atalanta – 2002–03
- Konstantinos Loumpoutis – Perugia, Siena – 2002–04
- Charalambos Lykogiannis – Cagliari, Bologna – 2017–26
- **Christos Mandas** – **Lazio** – 2023–25, 2026–
- Kostas Manolas – Roma, Napoli, Salernitana – 2014–22, 2023–24
- Vangelis Moras – Bologna, Cesena, Verona – 2008–12, 2013–16
- Evangelois Nastos – Perugia – 2003–04
- Dimitris Nikolaou – Empoli, Spezia – 2018–19, 2021–23
- Sotiris Ninis – Parma – 2012–13
- Marios Oikonomou – Cagliari, Bologna, SPAL, Sampdoria – 2013–14, 2015–18, 2022–23
- Christos Papadopoulos – Genoa – 2023–24
- Dimitrios Papadopoulos – Lecce – 2008–09
- Sokratis Papastathopoulos – Genoa, Milan – 2008–11
- Triantafyllos Pasalidis – Salernitana – 2023–24
- Panagiotis Retsos – Verona – 2021–23
- Nikos Spyropoulos – Chievo – 2012–13
- Panagiotis Tachtsidis – Roma, Catania, Torino, Verona, Genoa, Cagliari, Lecce – 2012–17, 2019–20
- Vasilis Torosidis – Roma, Bologna – 2012–18
- Kostas Tsimikas – Roma – 2025–26
- Alexandros Tziolis – Siena – 2009–10
- Alexandros Tzorvas – Palermo, Genoa – 2011–13
- Georgios Vakouftsis – Fiorentina – 1999–2000, 2001–02
- Zisis Vryzas – Perugia – 2000–04
- Vasilis Zagaritis – Parma – 2020–21
- Theodoros Zagorakis – Bologna – 2004–05

=== Hungary ===
István Nyers

- Botond Balogh – Parma – 2020–21, 2024–25
- Norbert Balogh – Palermo – 2015–17
- Lajos Détári – Bologna, Ancona, Genoa – 1990–91, 1992–94
- Róbert Feczesin – Brescia – 2010–11
- János Füzér – Genoa – 1947–48
- Tibor Garay – Inter, Pro Patria – 1947–49
- András Gosztonyi – Bari – 2009–10
- Krisztofer Horváth – SPAL – 2019–20
- János Hrotkó – Bari – 1946–49
- László Kaszás – Venezia – 1961–62
- Mihály Kincses – Atalanta, Juventus, Bari, Lucchese – 1946–52
- Vladimir Koman – Sampdoria, Bari – 2006–07, 2009–11
- Márk Kosznovszky – Parma – 2020–21
- Zsolt Laczkó – Sampdoria – 2010–11
- István Mike – Bologna, Lucchese, Napoli, Genoa – 1947–55
- Ádám Nagy – Bologna – 2016–19
- Gyula Nagy – Fiorentina – 1949–51
- János Nehadoma – Fiorentina – 1933–36
- István Nyers – Inter, Roma – 1948–56
- Sándor Olajkár – Atalanta – 1946–47
- Ferenc Ottavi – Fiorentina, Bari – 1933–34, 1935–37, 1938–39
- István Pakó – Livorno – 1948–49
- Rudolf Plemich – Triestina – 1929–30
- Gergely Rudolf – Genoa, Bari – 2010–11
- Roland Sallai – Palermo – 2016–17
- Béla Sárosi – Bologna, Bari – 1946–50
- Vilmos Sipos – Bologna – 1946–47
- László Szőke – Udinese, Triestina – 1952–57, 1958–59
- Dániel Tőzsér – Genoa – 2012–13
- Gyula Tóth – Lucchese – 1947–50
- István Turbéky – Pro Patria – 1949–52
- Mihail Uram – Lucchese – 1948–49
- Ádám Vass – Brescia – 2010–11
- István Vincze – Lecce – 1988–90
- Jenő Vinyei – Pro Patria, Napoli, Spal – 1949–56
- József Viola – Juventus – 1929–30
- Mihály Vörös – Bari – 1947–50
- Dionisiu Weisz – Padova – 1924–25
- József Zilisy – Milan – 1929–30
- Gyula Zsengellér – Roma – 1947–49

=== Iceland ===
- Andri Fannar Baldursson – Bologna – 2019–21
- Bjarki Steinn Bjarkason – Venezia – 2021–22, 2024–25
- Birkir Bjarnason – Pescara, Sampdoria, Brescia – 2012–14, 2019–20
- **Mikael Egill Ellertsson** – Spezia, Venezia, **Genoa** – 2022–23, 2024–
- Albert Guðmundsson (1923) – Milan – 1948–49
- **Albert Guðmundsson (1997)** – Genoa, **Fiorentina**, **Lazio** – 2021–22, 2023–
- Emil Hallfreðsson – Reggina, Verona, Udinese, Frosinone – 2007–09, 2013–19
- **Þórir Jóhann Helgason** – Lecce, **Venezia** – 2022–23, 2024–
- Hordur Magnússon – Cesena – 2014–15
- Hilmir Rafn Mikaelsson – Venezia – 2021–22
- Arnór Sigurðsson – Venezia – 2021–22

=== Israel ===
- Tal Banin – Brescia – 1997–98
- **Omri Gandelman** – **Lecce** – 2025–
- Dor Peretz – Venezia – 2021–22
- Lior Kasa – Genoa – 2024–25
- Suf Podgoreanu – Spezia - 2020–23
- Manor Solomon – Fiorentina – 2025–26
- Shon Weissman – Salernitana – 2023–24
- Eran Zahavi – Palermo – 2011–13

=== Kazakhstan ===
- Alexander Merkel – Milan, Genoa, Udinese – 2010–13, 2015–16

=== Kosovo ===
- Valon Berisha – Lazio – 2018–20
- **Arijanet Murić** – **Sassuolo** – 2025–
- Vedat Muriqi – Lazio – 2020–22
- **Albion Rrahmani** – **Venezia** – 2026–
- **Amir Rrahmani** – Verona, **Napoli** – 2019–
- Samir Ujkani – Palermo, Novara, Torino, Empoli – 2008–09, 2011–13, 2014–15, 2019–21, 2022–23
- **Mërgim Vojvoda** – Torino, Como, **Udinese** – 2020–
- **Edon Zhegrova** – **Juventus** – 2025–

=== Latvia ===
- Raimonds Krollis – Spezia – 2022–23

=== Liechtenstein ===
- Marcel Büchel – Empoli, Verona – 2015–18
- Mario Frick – Verona, Siena – 2001–02, 2006–09

=== Lithuania ===
- Tomas Danilevičius – Livorno – 2004–05, 2006–07, 2009–10
- Edgaras Dubickas – Lecce – 2019–20
- **Gvidas Gineitis** – **Torino** – 2022–
- Marius Stankevičius – Brescia, Sampdoria, Lazio – 2001–05, 2008–10, 2011–13

=== Luxembourg ===
- Issa Bah – Venezia – 2021–22

=== Moldova ===
- Vitalie Damașcan – Torino – 2018–19
- Artur Ioniță – Verona, Cagliari, Benevento – 2014–21
- Andrei Moțoc – Salernitana – 2021–22
- Sergiu Perciun – Torino – 2024–25

=== Monaco ===
- Grégory Campi – Bari – 1997–99

=== Montenegro ===
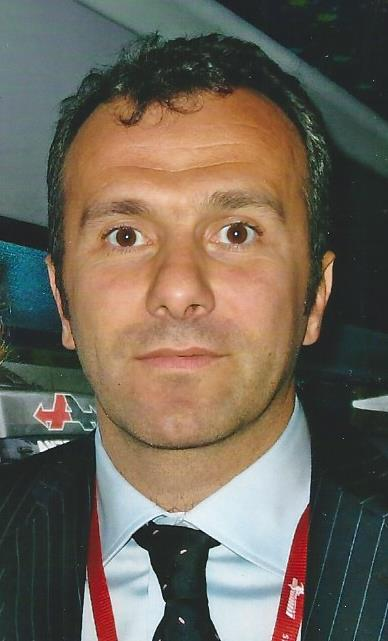
Dejan Savićević, one of the stars of the '90 AC Milan

- **Vasilije Adžić** – Juventus, **Sassuolo** – 2024–
- Marko Bakić – Torino, Fiorentina – 2012–14
- Luka Đorđević – Sampdoria – 2014–15
- Uroš Đurđević – Palermo – 2015–16
- Ivan Fatić – Genoa, Cesena – 2009–11
- Sergej Grubac – Chievo – 2018–19
- Marko Janković – SPAL – 2018–20
- Stevan Jovetić – Fiorentina, Inter – 2008–13, 2015–17
- **Nikola Krstović** – Lecce, **Atalanta** – 2023–
- **Adam Marušić** – **Lazio** – 2017–
- Predrag Mijatović – Fiorentina – 1999–2002( (Serbia and Montenegro) while active)
- **Milutin Osmajić** – **Genoa** – 2026–
- Vukašin Poleksić – Lecce – 2003–04 ( (Serbia and Montenegro) while active)
- Stefan Savić – Fiorentina – 2012–15
- Dejan Savićević – Milan – 1992–98 ( (Federal Republic of Yugoslavia) while active)
- Ognjen Stijepović – Sampdoria – 2017–18
- Marko Vešović – Torino – 2013–14
- Mirko Vučinić – Lecce, Roma, Juventus – 2000–02, 2003–14 ( (Serbia and Montenegro) while active)
- Miodrag Vukotić – Empoli – 1997–98 ( (Federal Republic of Yugoslavia) while active)

=== Netherlands ===
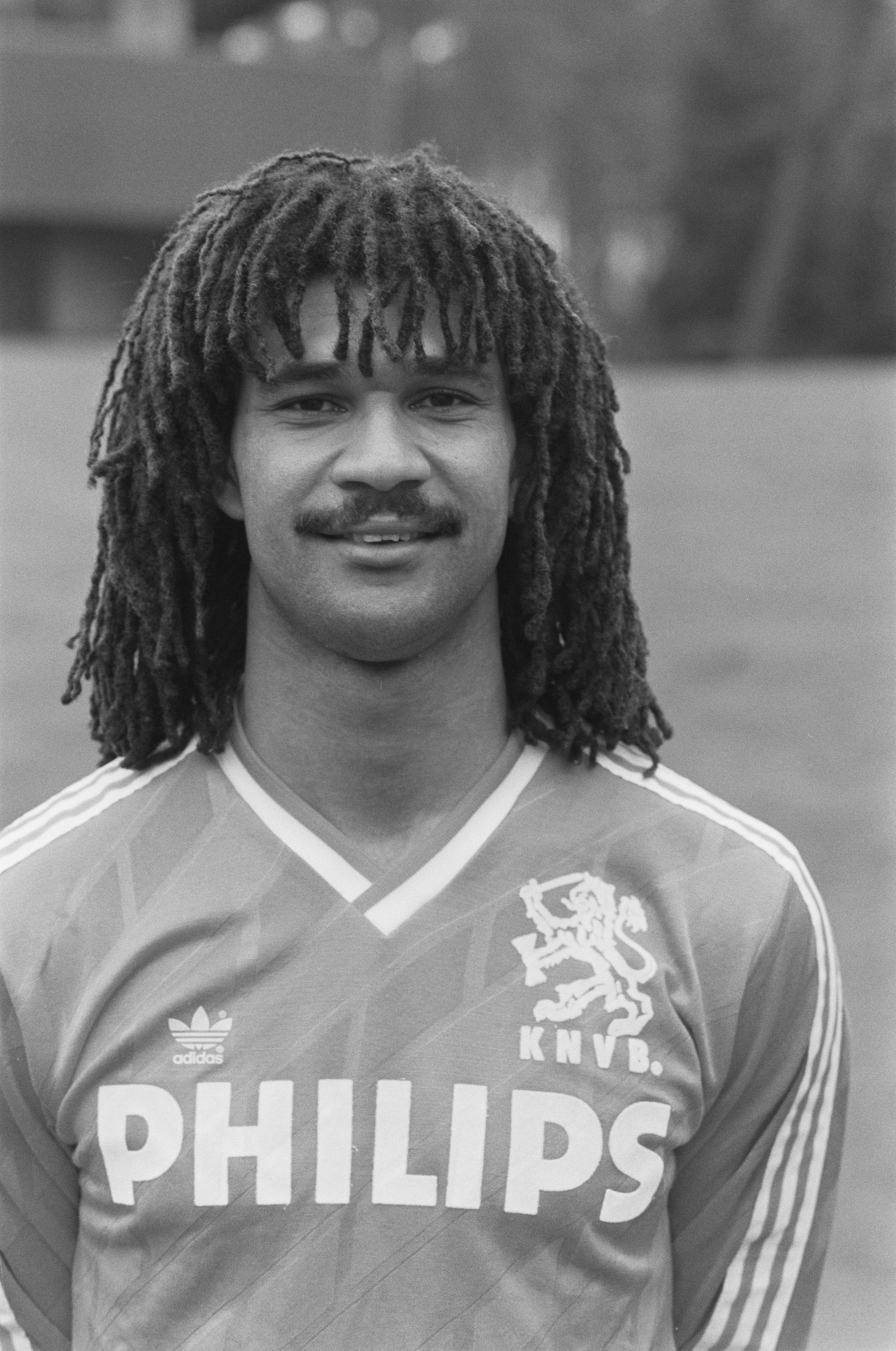
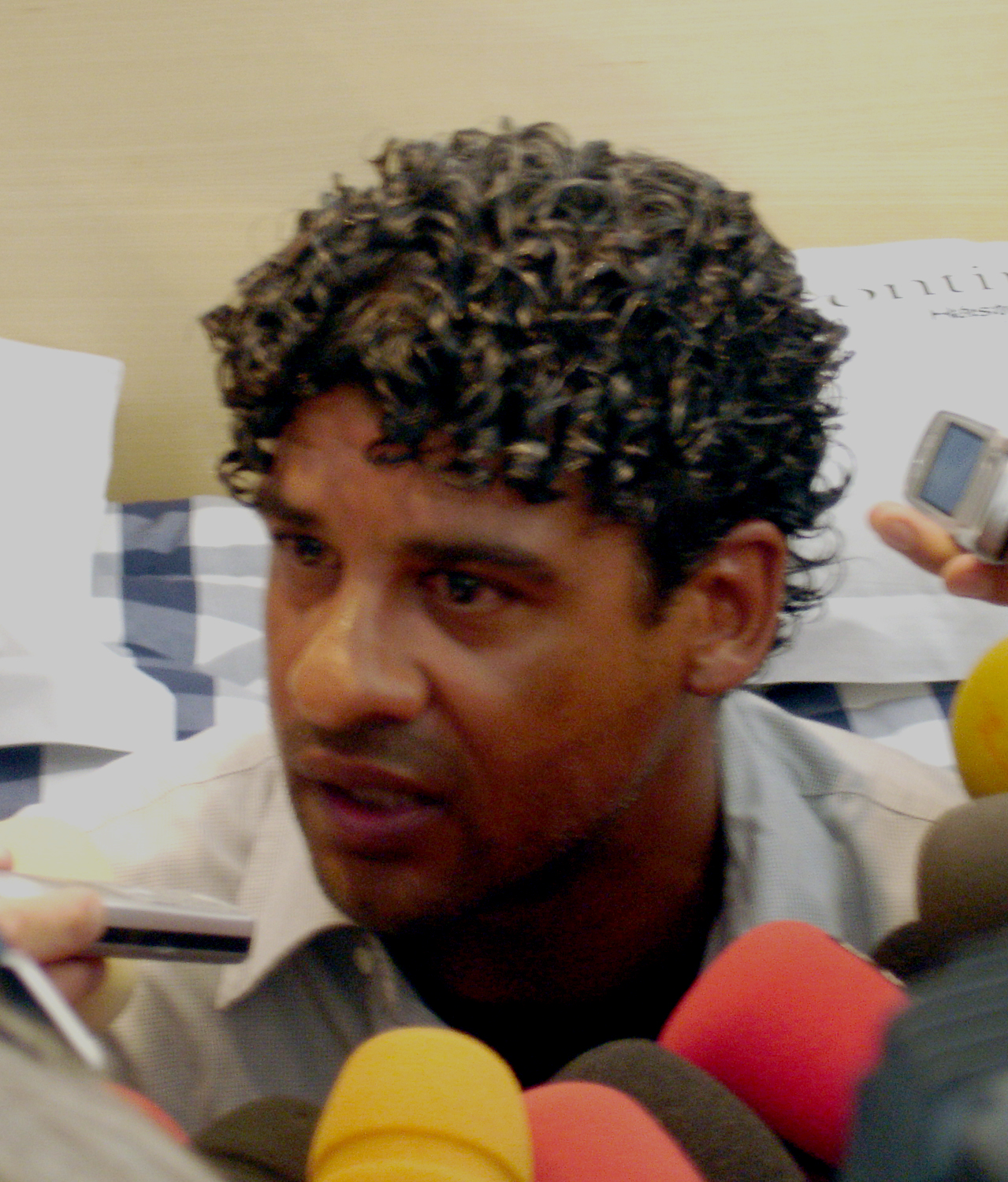
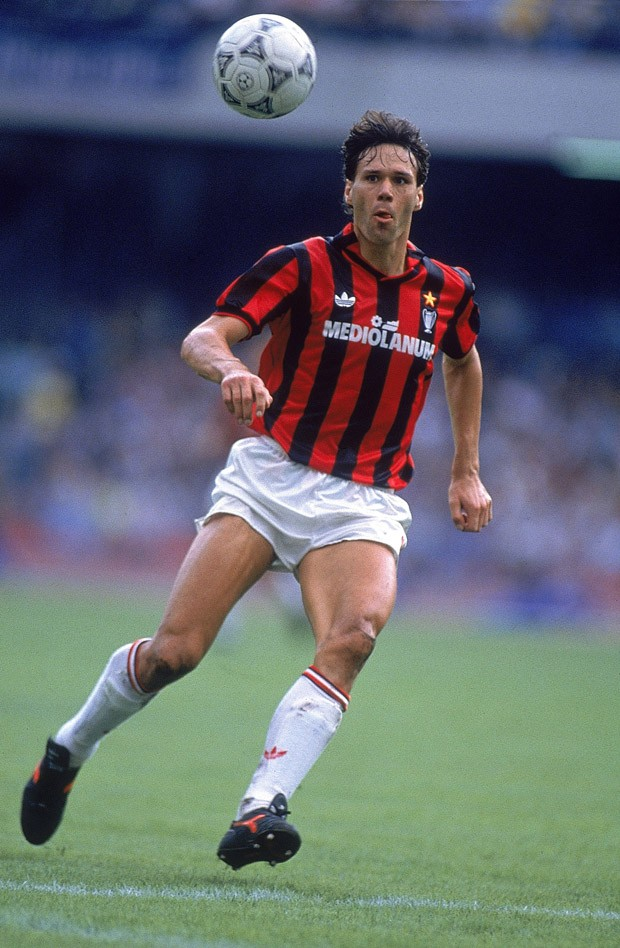
Ruud Gullit, Frank Rijkaard and Marco Van Basten have been extremely important for Milan

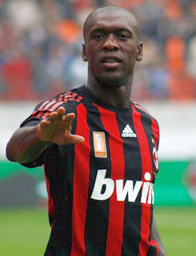
Clarence Seedorf playing for Milan

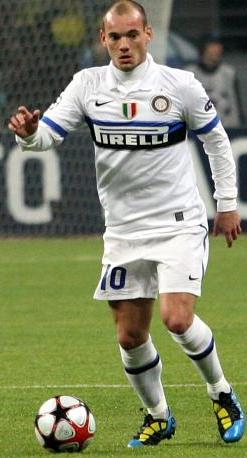
Wesley Sneijder, a protagonist of the 2010 treble by Inter

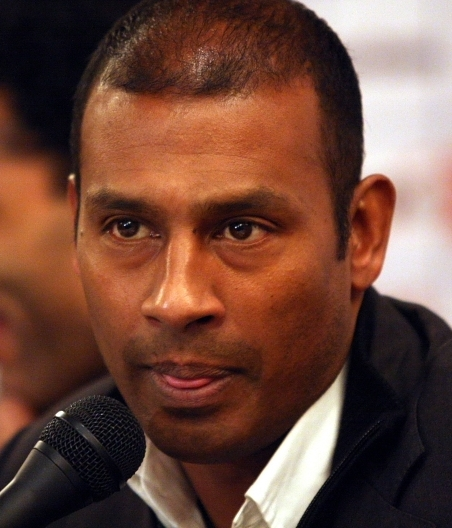
Aron Winter

- **Jayden Addai** – **Como** – 2025–
- Bobby Adekanye – Lazio – 2019–20
- Mitchel Bakker – Atalanta – 2023–26
- Mario Been – Pisa – 1988–89, 1990–91
- Dennis Bergkamp – Inter – 1993–95
- **Sam Beukema** – Bologna, **Napoli** – 2023–
- **Justin Bijlow** – **Genoa** – 2025–
- Winston Bogarde – Milan – 1997–98
- Jayden Braaf – Udinese, Verona – 2020–21, 2022–23
- Edson Braafheid – Lazio – 2014–16
- Luc Castaignos – Inter – 2011–12
- Thijs Dallinga – Bologna – 2024–26
- Edgar Davids – Milan, Juventus, Inter – 1996–2005
- Nigel de Jong – Milan – 2012–16
- Matthijs de Ligt – Juventus – 2019–22
- Jonathan de Guzmán – Napoli, Carpi, Chievo – 2014–17
- **Marten de Roon** – Atalanta, **Roma** – 2015–16, 2017–
- Stefan de Vrij – Lazio, Inter – 2014–26
- Mitchell Dijks – Bologna – 2018–22
- **Danilho Doekhi** – **Lazio** – 2026–
- Denzel Dumfries – Inter – 2021–26
- **Jurgen Ekkelenkamp** – **Udinese** – 2024–
- Eljero Elia – Juventus – 2011–12
- Urby Emanuelson – Milan, Roma, Atalanta, Verona – 2010–16
- **Jay Enem** – **Bologna** – 2026–
- **Kian Fitz-Jim** – **Torino** – 2026–
- **Olaf Gorter** – **Lecce** – 2025–
- Ruud Gullit – Milan, Sampdoria – 1987–95
- Hans Hateboer – Atalanta – 2016–24
- Wesley Hoedt – Lazio – 2015–17, 2020–21
- Klaas-Jan Huntelaar – Milan – 2009–10
- Wim Jonk – Inter – 1993–95
- Rick Karsdorp – Roma – 2017–19, 2020–24
- Denso Kasius – Bologna – 2021–23
- Wim Kieft – Pisa, Torino – 1983–84, 1985–87
- Ricardo Kishna – Lazio – 2015–17
- Davy Klaassen – Inter – 2023–24
- Justin Kluivert – Roma – 2018–21
- Patrick Kluivert – Milan – 1997–98
- **Teun Koopmeiners** – Atalanta, **Juventus** – 2021–
- Michel Kreek – Padova, Perugia – 1994–97
- Ruud Krol – Napoli – 1980–84
- Piet Kruiver – Vicenza – 1961–62
- Wim Lakenberg – Pro Patria – 1950–51
- Sam Lammers – Atalanta, Empoli, Sampdoria – 2020–23
- **Noa Lang** – **Napoli** – 2025–
- Timo Letschert – Sassuolo – 2016–18
- **Donyell Malen** – **Roma** – 2025–
- **Tijjani Noslin** – Verona, **Lazio** – 2023–
- Bram Nuytinck – Udinese, Sampdoria – 2017–23
- **Cas Odenthal** – **Sassuolo** – 2025–
- Thomas Ouwejan – Udinese – 2020–21
- Johannes Peters – Genoa, Atalanta – 1982–84, 1985–86
- Othniël Raterink – Cagliari – 2025–26
- Tijjani Reijnders – Milan – 2023–25
- Michael Reiziger – Milan – 1996–97
- **Devyne Rensch** – **Roma** – 2024–
- Frank Rijkaard – Milan – 1988–93
- Andries Roosenburg – Fiorentina – 1950–53
- Bryan Roy – Foggia – 1992–94
- Jerdy Schouten – Bologna – 2019–23
- Perr Schuurs – Torino – 2022–24
- Clarence Seedorf – Sampdoria, Inter, Milan – 1995–96, 1999–2012
- Wesley Sneijder – Inter – 2009–13
- Jaap Stam – Lazio, Milan – 2001–06
- Calvin Stengs – Pisa – 2025–26
- Kevin Strootman – Roma, Genoa, Cagliari – 2013–19, 2020–22, 2023–24
- Maarten Stekelenburg – Roma – 2011–13
- Elayis Tavşan – Verona – 2023–24
- **Kenneth Taylor** – **Lazio** – 2025–
- Hidde ter Avest – Udinese – 2018–21
- Marco van Basten – Milan – 1987–93
- Mark van Bommel – Milan – 2010–12
- Michel van de Korput – Torino – 1980–83
- Andy van der Meyde – Inter – 2003–05
- Edwin van der Sar – Juventus – 1999–2001
- Henry van der Vegt – Udinese – 1998–2000
- Gregory van der Wiel – Cagliari – 2017–18
- Marco van Ginkel – Milan – 2014–15
- Sydney van Hooijdonk – Bologna – 2021–22, 2023–24
- John van 't Schip – Genoa – 1992–95
- Leonard van Utrecht – Padova – 1995–96
- Tonny Vilhena – Salernitana – 2022–23
- Marciano Vink – Genoa – 1993–94
- Rai Vloet – Frosinone – 2018–19
- Harald Wapenaar – Udinese – 1998–99
- Georginio Wijnaldum – Roma – 2022–23
- Faas Wilkes – Inter, Torino – 1949–53
- Aron Winter – Lazio, Inter – 1992–99
- Deyovaisio Zeefuik – Verona – 2022–23
- Marvin Zeegelaar – Udinese – 2018–23
- Joshua Zirkzee – Parma, Bologna – 2020–21, 2022–24
- Jeroen Zoet – Spezia – 2020–23

=== North Macedonia ===
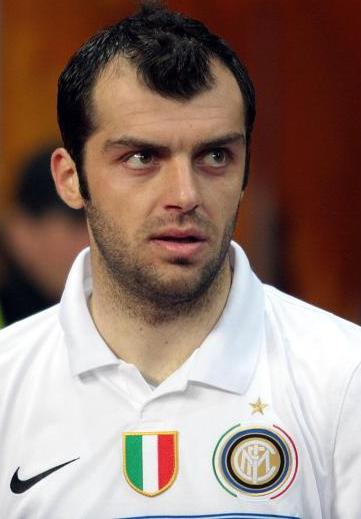
Goran Pandev was part of Inter's treble success in 2010.

- **Eljif Elmas** – Napoli, Torino, **Atalanta** – 2019–
- Agim Ibraimi – Cagliari – 2013–14
- Ilija Nestorovski – Palermo, Udinese – 2016–17, 2019–23
- Spasoje Nikolić – Venezia – 1949–50 ( (Socialist Federal Republic of Yugoslavia) while active)
- Darko Pančev – Inter – 1992–93, 1994–95
- Goran Pandev – Ancona, Lazio, Inter, Napoli, Genoa – 2003–14, 2015–22
- Stefan Ristovski – Parma – 2014–15
- Goran Slavkovski – Inter – 2005–06
- Dejan Stojanović – Bologna – 2012–14
- Aleksandar Trajkovski – Palermo – 2015–17

=== Northern Ireland ===
- Paddy Sloan – Milan, Torino – 1948–49

=== Norway ===
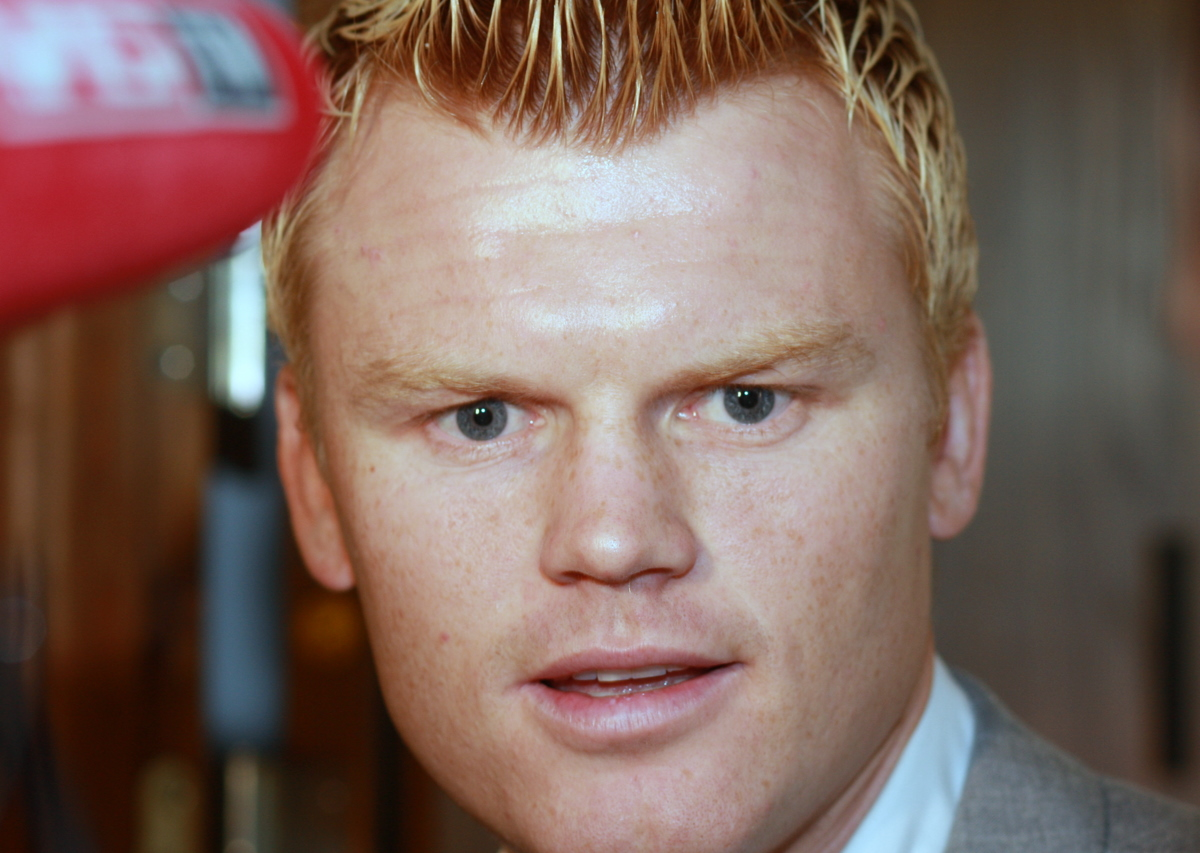
John Arne Riise

- Haitam Aleesami – Palermo – 2016–17
- Knut Andersen – Padova – 1951–52
- Kristoffer Askildsen – Sampdoria, Lecce – 2019–23
- Runar Berg – Venezia – 1999–2000
- Emil Bohinen – Salernitana, Genoa – 2021–25
- Erik Botheim – Salernitana – 2022–24
- Per Bredesen – Lazio, Milan, Bari – 1952–55, 1956–57, 1958–59
- John Carew – Roma – 2003–04
- Emil Konradsen Ceide – Sassuolo – 2021–24
- Tore André Flo – Siena – 2003–05
- Finn Gundersen – Verona – 1957–58
- Jens Petter Hauge – Milan – 2020–21
- **Torbjørn Heggem** – **Bologna** – 2025–
- **Eivind Helland** – **Bologna** – 2025–
- Erik Huseklepp – Bari – 2010–11
- Dennis Johnsen – Venezia, Cremonese – 2021–22, 2025–26
- Julian Kristoffersen – Salernitana – 2021–23
- Ragnar Larsen – Lazio, Genoa – 1951–56
- Mathias Løvik – Parma – 2024–26
- Steinar Nilsen – Milan – 1997–98
- **Leo Skiri Østigård** – **Genoa**, Napoli – 2021–24, 2025–
- Martin Palumbo – Udinese, Juventus – 2019–22
- Marcus Holmgren Pedersen – Sassuolo, Torino – 2023–27
- John Arne Riise – Roma – 2008–11
- Petter Rudi – Perugia – 1996–97
- Ola Solbakken – Roma, Empoli – 2022–25
- Stefan Strandberg – Salernitana – 2021–22
- Morten Thorsby – Sampdoria, Genoa, Cremonese – 2019–22, 2023–26
- **Kristian Thorstvedt** – **Sassuolo** – 2022–24, 2025–
- Rafik Zekhnini – Fiorentina – 2017–18

=== Poland ===
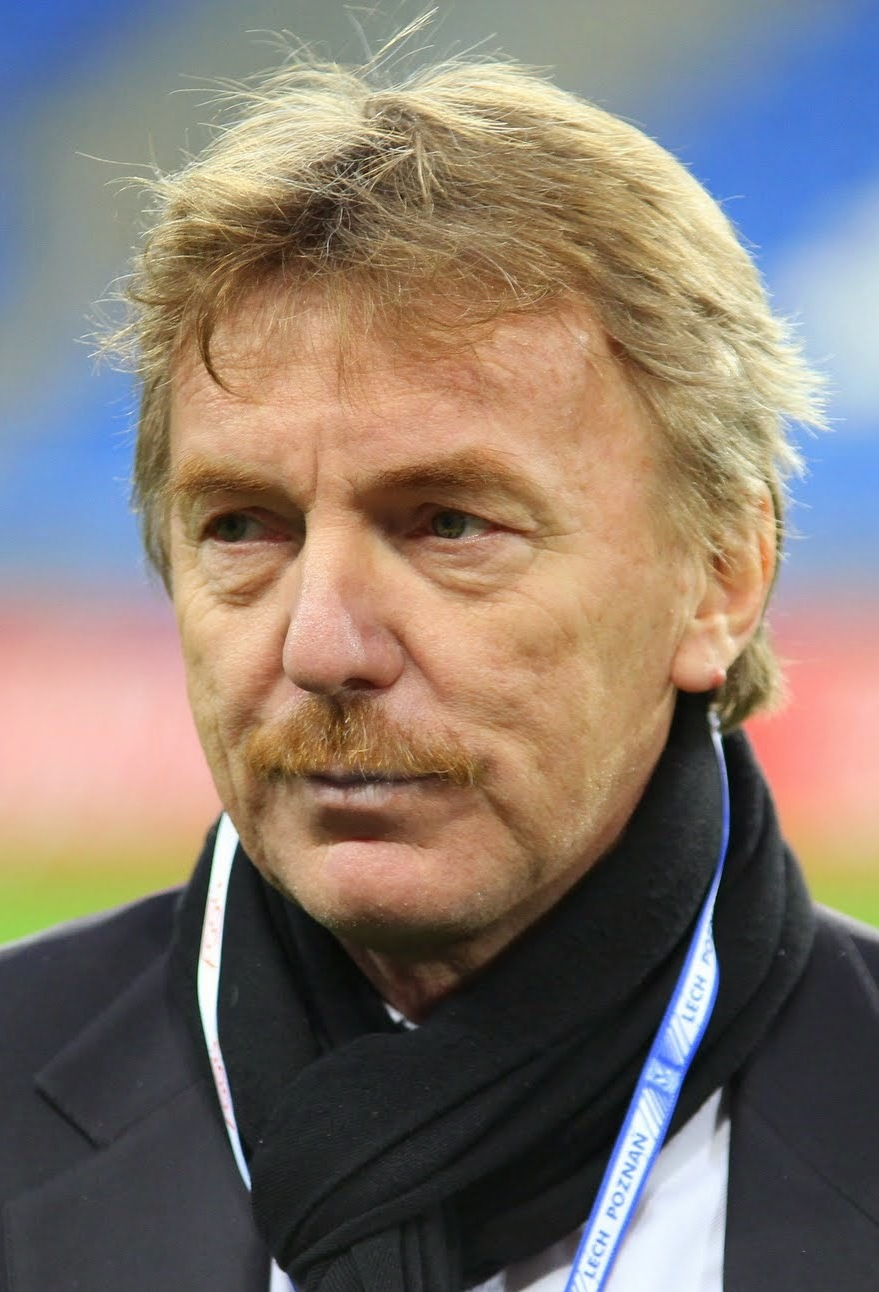
Zbigniew Boniek in 2015

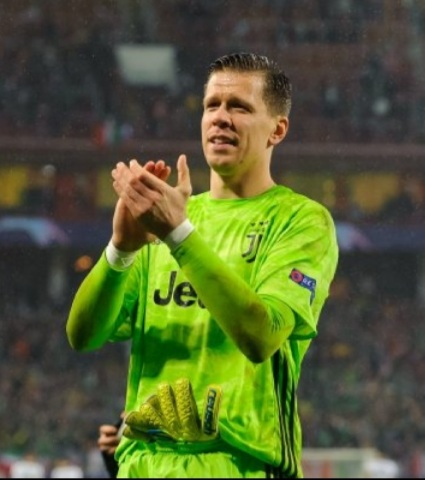
Wojciech Szczęsny with Juventus in 2019

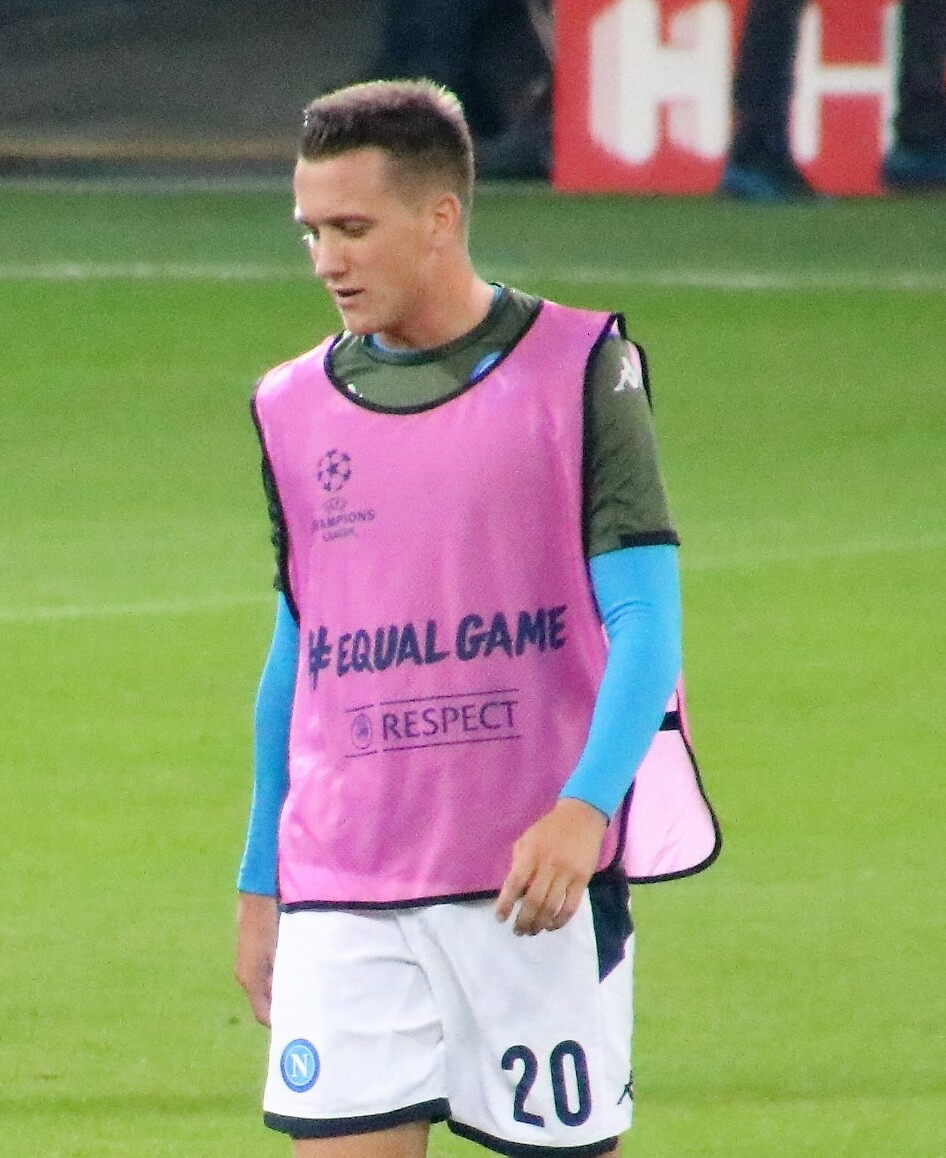
Piotr Zieliński with Napoli in 2019

- Dariusz Adamczuk – Udinese – 1993–94
- Błażej Augustyn – Catania – 2009–11, 2012–13
- Adrian Benedyczak – Parma – 2024–26
- Bartosz Bereszyński – Sampdoria, Napoli, Empoli – 2016–24
- Jakub Błaszczykowski – Fiorentina – 2015–16
- Zbigniew Boniek – Juventus, Roma – 1982–88
- Artur Boruc – Fiorentina – 2010–12
- Adam Buksa – Udinese – 2025–26
- Aleksander Buksa – Genoa – 2021–22
- Thiago Cionek – Palermo, SPAL – 2015–20
- Piotr Czachowski – Udinese – 1992–93
- Paweł Dawidowicz – Verona – 2019–25
- Bartłomiej Drągowski – Fiorentina, Empoli, Spezia – 2016–23
- Dominik Furman – Verona – 2015–16
- Kamil Glik – Bari, Torino, Benevento – 2010–11, 2012–16, 2020–21
- Jakub Iskra – SPAL – 2019–20
- Filip Jagiełło – Genoa – 2019–20, 2023–24
- Paweł Jaroszyński – Chievo, Salernitana – 2017–19, 2021–22
- Jakub Kiwior – Spezia – 2021–23
- Kamil Kosowski – Chievo – 2006–07
- Mateusz Kowalski – Parma – 2024–25
- Dawid Kownacki – Sampdoria – 2017–19
- Marek Koźmiński – Udinese, Brescia – 1992–94, 1995–98, 2000–02
- Tomasz Kupisz – Chievo – 2013–14
- Igor Łasicki – Napoli – 2013–14
- Mateusz Łęgowski – Salernitana – 2023–24
- Karol Linetty – Sampdoria, Torino – 2016–25
- Marcin Listkowski – Lecce – 2022–24
- Jordan Majchrzak – Roma – 2022–23
- Filip Marchwiński – Lecce – 2024–25
- Radosław Matusiak – Palermo – 2006–07
- Daniel Mikołajewski – Parma – 2025–26
- **Arkadiusz Milik** – Napoli, **Juventus** – 2016–20, 2022–24, 2025–
- Krzysztof Piątek – Genoa, Milan, Fiorentina, Salernitana – 2018–20, 2021–23
- **Jakub Piotrowski** – **Udinese** – 2025–
- Mateusz Praszelik – Verona – 2021–22
- **Adrian Przyborek** – **Lazio** – 2025–
- Arkadiusz Reca – Atalanta, SPAL, Crotone, Spezia – 2018–23
- Bartosz Salamon – Sampdoria, Cagliari, SPAL, Frosinone – 2013–14, 2016–20
- **Łukasz Skorupski** – Roma, Empoli, **Bologna** – 2013–
- Mariusz Stępiński – Chievo, Verona – 2017–20
- Karol Świderski – Verona – 2023–24
- Wojciech Szczęsny – Roma, Juventus – 2015–24
- Przemysław Szymiński – Frosinone – 2023–24
- Łukasz Teodorczyk – Udinese – 2018–20
- Kacper Urbański – Bologna, Monza – 2020–22, 2023–25
- **Sebastian Walukiewicz** – Cagliari, Empoli, Torino, **Sassuolo** – 2019–
- Mateusz Wieteska – Cagliari – 2023–25
- Kamil Wilczek – Carpi – 2015–16
- Przemysław Wiśniewski – Spezia – 2022–23
- Rafał Wolski – Fiorentina – 2012–14
- Paweł Wszołek – Sampdoria, Verona – 2013–16
- **Nicola Zalewski** – Roma, Inter, **Atalanta** – 2020–
- **Piotr Zieliński** – Udinese, Empoli, Napoli, **Inter** – 2012–
- **Jan Ziółkowski** – **Roma** – 2025–
- Władysław Żmuda – Verona, Cremonese – 1982–85
- Szymon Żurkowski – Fiorentina, Empoli, Spezia – 2019–20, 2021–25

=== Portugal ===
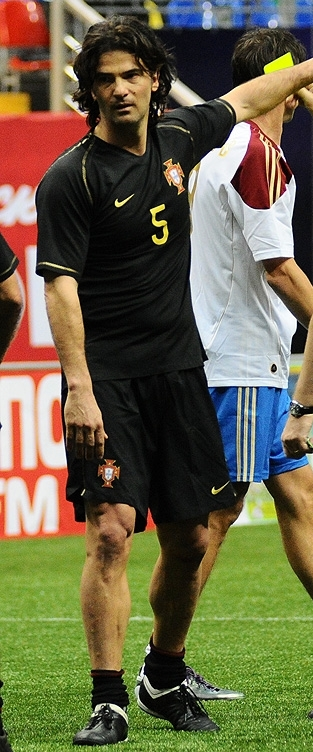
Fernando Couto in 2011

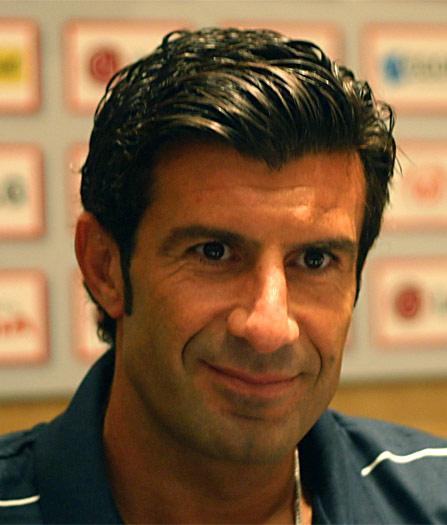
Luís Figo

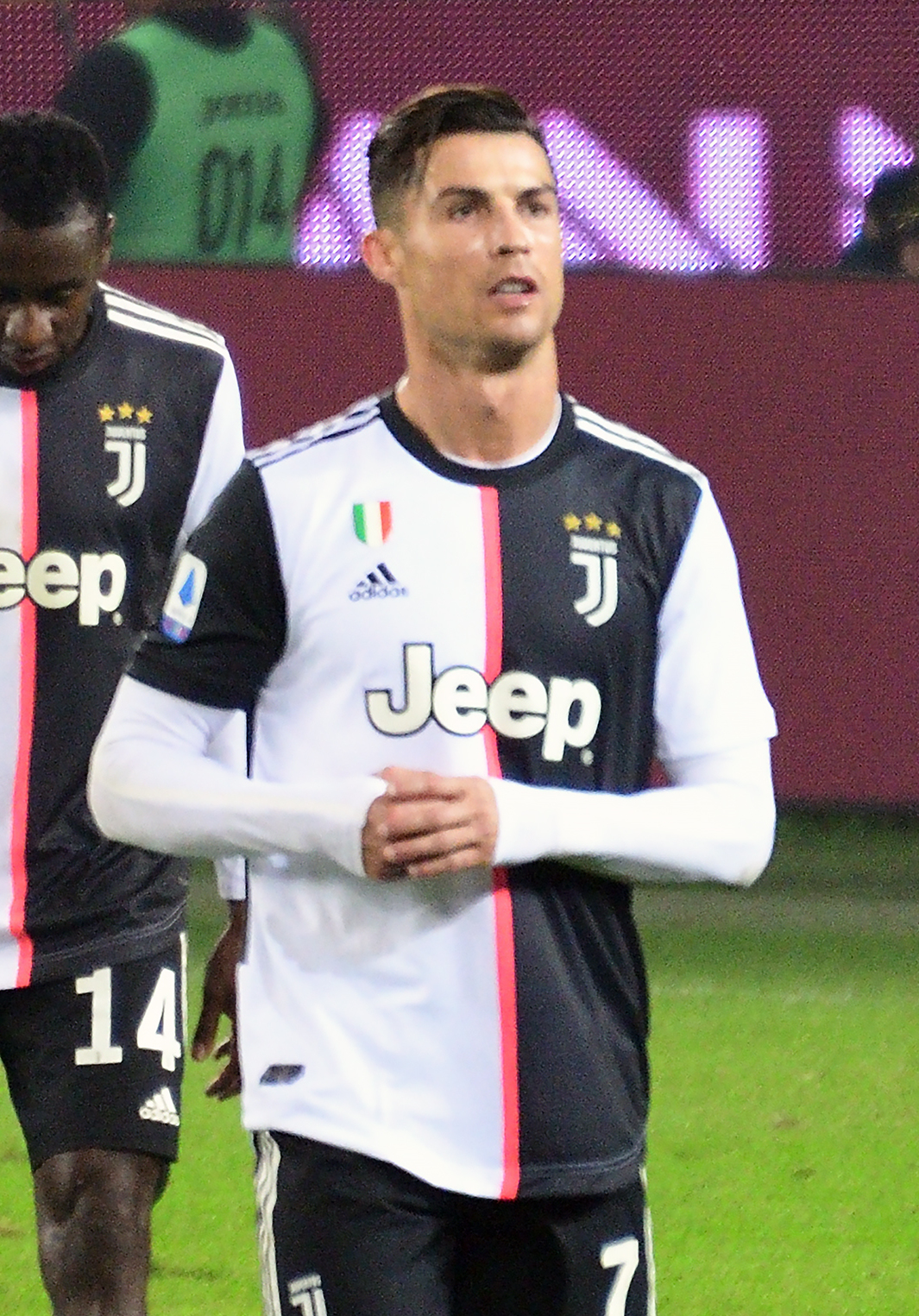
Cristiano Ronaldo playing for Juventus in 2020

- Salvador Agra – Siena – 2012–13
- Hugo Almeida – Cesena – 2014–15
- Bruno Alves – Cagliari, Parma – 2016–17, 2018–21
- Jorge Andrade – Juventus – 2007–08
- Vitorino Antunes – Roma, Lecce – 2007–09
- Gonçalo Brandão – Siena, Parma – 2008–10, 2011–12
- **Daniel Bragança** – **Torino** – 2026–
- Leonardo Buta – Udinese – 2022–23
- Jorge Cadete – Brescia – 1994–95
- Marco Caneira – Reggina – 2000–01
- Cédric – Inter – 2018–19
- **Francisco Conceição** – **Juventus** – 2024–
- Sérgio Conceição – Lazio, Parma, Inter – 1998–2004
- Félix Correia – Juventus – 2020–21
- **Thierry Correia** – **Venezia** – 2026–
- Alberto Costa – Juventus – 2024–25
- Paulo Costa – Reggina – 2000–01
- Costinha – Atalanta – 2007–08
- Fernando Couto – Parma, Lazio – 1994–96, 1998–2008
- Diogo Dalot – Milan – 2020–21
- Danilo Pereira – Parma – 2011–12
- Gil Bastião Dias – Fiorentina – 2017–18
- Dimas – Juventus – 1996–99
- Tiago Djaló – Juventus – 2023–24
- Diogo Figueiras – Genoa – 2015–16
- Eduardo – Genoa – 2010–11
- Eliseu – Lazio – 2009–10
- Ricardo Esteves – Reggina – 2004–05, 2006–07
- Tomás Esteves – Pisa – 2025–26
- Vasco Faísca – Vicenza – 2000–01
- Bruno Fernandes – Udinese, Sampdoria – 2013–17
- Luís Figo – Inter – 2005–09
- Paulo Futre – Reggiana, Milan – 1993–96
- **Tiago Gabriel** – **Lecce** – 2024–
- **Pedro Gonçalves** – **Fiorentina** – 2026–
- Hilário – Perugia – 1998–2001
- Hugo – Sampdoria – 1997–99
- João Cancelo – Inter, Juventus – 2017–19
- João Costa – Roma – 2023–24
- João Félix – Milan – 2024–25
- João Ferreira – Udinese – 2023–24
- João Mário (Naval da Costa Eduardo) – Inter – 2016–19
- **João Mário (Neto Lopes)** – Juventus, Bologna, **Fiorentina** – 2025–
- João Moutinho – Spezia – 2022–23
- João Silva – Palermo – 2014–15
- Bruno Jordão – Lazio – 2018–19
- Jorge Humberto – Inter, Vicenza – 1961–64
- Rafael Leão – Milan – 2019–26
- **Diogo Leite** – **Lazio** – 2026–
- Mamede – Reggina, Messina – 2000–01, 2002–03, 2004–06
- **Ricardo Mangas** – **Monza** – 2026–
- Maniche – Inter – 2007–08
- Luís Maximiano – Lazio – 2022–23
- Iuri Medeiros – Genoa – 2017–2019
- Pedro Mendes – Parma, Sassuolo – 2013–15
- **Rodrigo Mora** – **Roma** – 2026–
- **Dany Mota** – **Monza** – 2022–25, 2026–
- Herculano Nabian – Empoli – 2022–23
- Nani – Lazio, Venezia – 2017–18, 2021–22
- Nélson – Palermo – 2012–13
- Luís Neto – Siena – 2012–13
- Pedro Neto – Lazio – 2018–19
- Nuno Gomes – Fiorentina – 2000–02
- Filipe Oliveira – Parma – 2010–11
- Sérgio Oliveira – Roma – 2021–22
- António Pacheco – Reggiana – 1996–97
- Pelé – Inter – 2007–08
- Pedro Pereira – Sampdoria, Genoa, Crotone, Monza – 2015–19, 2020–21, 2023–25
- Bruno Pereirinha – Lazio – 2012–15
- Hélder Postiga – Lazio – 2013–14
- Ricardo Quaresma – Inter – 2008–10
- Domingos Quina – Udinese – 2023–24
- Rolando – Napoli, Inter – 2012–14
- Cristiano Ronaldo – Juventus – 2018–22
- Mário Rui – Empoli, Roma, Napoli – 2014–24
- Rui Águas – Reggiana – 1994–95
- Rui Barros – Juventus – 1988–90
- Rui Costa – Fiorentina, Milan – 1994–2006
- Rui Patrício – Roma, Atalanta – 2021–25
- **Gonçalo Ramos** – **Milan** – 2026–
- Rui Sampaio – Cagliari – 2011–12
- Renato Sanches – Roma – 2023–24
- José Semedo – Cagliari – 2006–07
- Vivaldo Semedo – Udinese – 2022–24
- Adrien Silva – Sampdoria – 2020–22
- André Silva – Milan – 2017–18, 2019–20
- Dani Silva – Verona – 2023–25
- Paulo Sousa – Juventus, Inter, Parma – 1994–96, 1997–2000
- Jorge Teixeira – Siena – 2012–13
- **Nuno Tavares** – **Lazio** – 2024–
- Tiago – Juventus– 2007–10
- **Gustavo Varela** – **Monza** – 2026–
- Silvestre Varela – Parma – 2014–15
- **Danilo Veiga** – **Lecce** – 2024–
- Renato Veiga – Juventus – 2024–25
- Miguel Veloso – Genoa, Verona – 2010–12, 2016–23
- Luís Vidigal – Napoli, Livorno, Udinese – 2000–01, 2004–08
- Rúben Vinagre – Verona – 2023–24
- **Vitinha** – **Genoa** – 2023–
- Abel Xavier – Bari, Roma – 1995–96, 2004–05
- **Zé Pedro** – **Cagliari** – 2025–

=== Republic of Ireland ===
- **James Abankwah** – **Udinese** – 2022–23, 2024–25, 2026–
- Liam Brady – Juventus, Sampdoria, Inter, Ascoli – 1980–87
- Festy Ebosele – Udinese – 2022–24
- Evan Ferguson – Roma – 2025–26
- Robbie Keane – Inter – 2000–01
- **Corrie Ndaba** – **Lecce** – 2025–

=== Romania ===
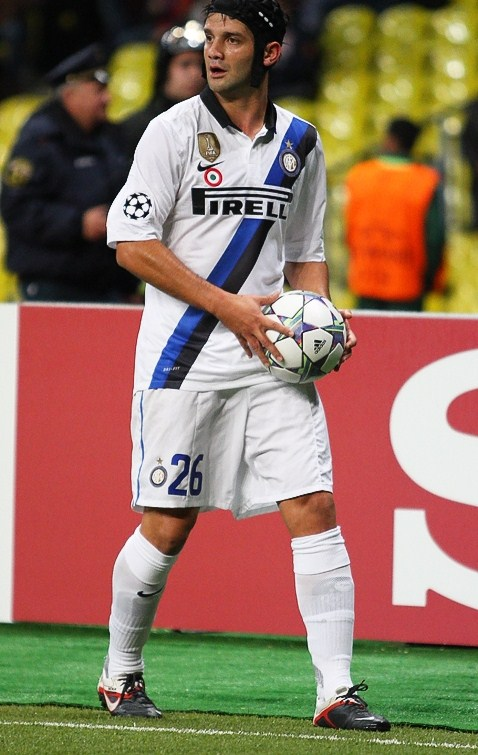
Cristian Chivu

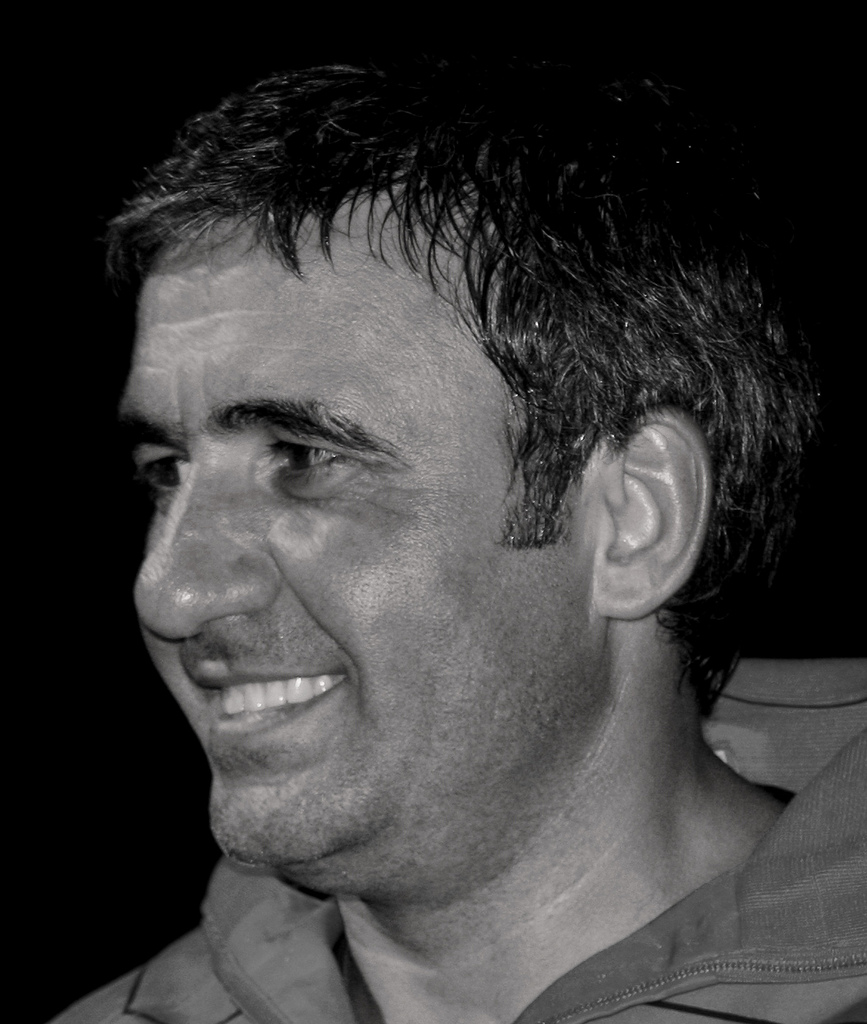
Gheorghe Hagi

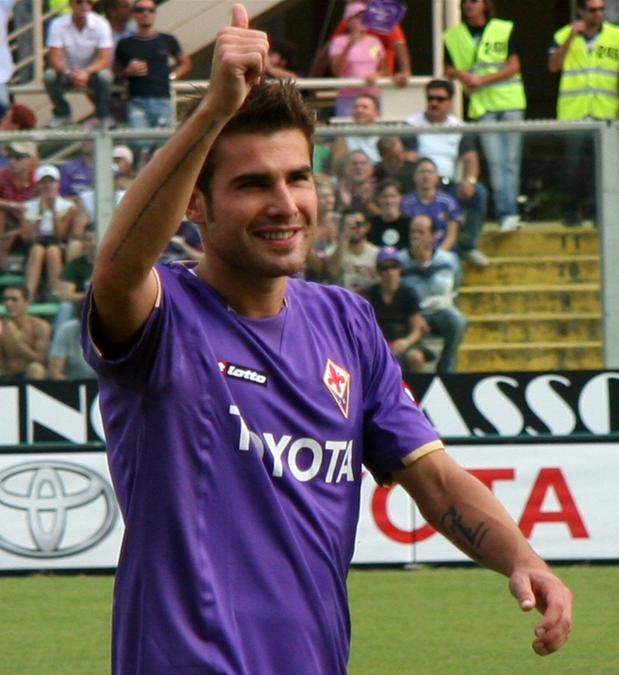
Adrian Mutu

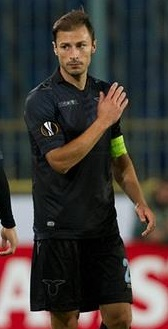
Ștefan Radu

- Marius Alexe – Sassuolo – 2013–14
- Denis Alibec – Inter, Bologna – 2010–11, 2013–14
- Romario Benzar – Lecce – 2019–20
- **Daniel Bîrligea** – **Frosinone** – 2026–
- Ionică Bogdan – Bari – 1947–48
- Deian Boldor – Verona – 2017–18
- **Daniel Boloca** – **Sassuolo** – 2023–24, 2025–
- Rareș Burnete – Lecce – 2023–25
- Vlad Chiricheș – Napoli, Sassuolo, Cremonese – 2015–23
- Cristian Chivu – Roma, Inter – 2003–13
- Paul Codrea – Perugia, Palermo, Siena, Bari – 2003–04, 2005–12
- Florinel Coman – Cagliari – 2024–25
- Cosmin Contra – Milan – 2001–02
- Nicolae Dică – Catania – 2008–09
- Denis Drăguș – Crotone – 2020–21
- **Radu Drăgușin** – Juventus, Sampdoria, Salernitana, Genoa, **Fiorentina** – 2020–22, 2023–24, 2026–
- Iosif Fabian – Torino, Lucchese, Bari – 1947–50
- Dorin Goian – Palermo – 2009–11
- Gheorghe Hagi – Brescia – 1992–93
- Ianis Hagi – Fiorentina – 2016–17
- Norbert Höfling – Lazio, Pro Patria, Vicenza – 1948–53, 1954–56
- Marius Lăcătuș – Fiorentina – 1990–91
- Bogdan Lobonț – Fiorentina, Roma – 2005–06, 2009–13
- Dănuț Lupu – Brescia – 1994–95
- Dennis Man – Parma – 2020–21, 2024–25
- Marius Marin – Pisa – 2025–26
- Răzvan Marin – Cagliari, Empoli – 2020–25
- Dorin Mateuț – Brescia, Reggiana – 1992–95
- Cristian Melinte – Palermo – 2009–10
- Emil Micossi – Genoa – 1932–33
- Valentin Mihăilă – Parma, Atalanta – 2020–22, 2024–25
- Alexandru Mitriță – Pescara – 2016–17
- Cosmin Moți – Siena – 2008–09
- Adrian Mutu – Inter, Verona, Parma, Juventus, Fiorentina, Cesena – 1999–2003, 2004–12
- Valentin Năstase – Bologna, Ascoli – 2004–05, 2006–07
- Viorel Năstase – Catanzaro – 1981–83
- Constantin Nica – Atalanta, Cesena – 2013–15
- Paul Papp – Chievo – 2012–14
- Bogdan Pătrașcu – Piacenza, Chievo – 2001–03, 2008–09
- Victor Pepoli – Genoa, Palermo – 1933–35
- Adrian Piț – Roma – 2007–08, 2009–10
- Dan Petrescu – Foggia, Genoa – 1991–94
- Gheorghe Popescu – Lecce – 2001–02
- George Pușcaș – Inter, Benevento, Genoa – 2014–15, 2017–18, 2023–24
- Florian Radu – Roma – 1948–49
- Ionuț Radu – Inter, Genoa, Cremonese, Venezia – 2015–16, 2018–23, 2024–25
- Ștefan Radu – Lazio – 2007–23
- Florin Răducioiu – Bari, Verona, Brescia, Milan – 1990–94
- Ioan Sabău – Brescia, Reggiana – 1992–93, 1994–95, 1996–98
- Răzvan Sava – Udinese – 2024–25
- Andres Sfait – Salernitana – 2023–24
- Nicolae Simatoc – Inter – 1947–49
- Nicolae Stanciu – Genoa – 2025–26
- Adrian Stoian – Roma, Chievo, Genoa, Crotone – 2008–09, 2012–14, 2016–18
- Sergiu Suciu – Torino – 2008–09, 2012–13
- Gabriel Torje – Udinese – 2011–12
- Alin Toșca – Benevento – 2017–18
- Ciprian Tătărușanu – Fiorentina, Milan – 2014–17, 2020–23
- Ioan Vermeșan – Verona – 2025–26
- Ianis Zicu – Parma – 2003–05

=== Russia ===
- Dmitri Alenichev – Roma, Perugia – 1998–2000
- Viktor Budyanskiy – Juventus, Reggina, Ascoli, Udinese, Lecce – 2003–05, 2006–09
- Igor Dobrovolski – Genoa – 1992–93 ( (Commonwealth of Independent States) while active)
- Andrei Kanchelskis – Fiorentina – 1996–98
- Aleksandr Kokorin – Fiorentina – 2020–22
- Igor Kolyvanov – Foggia, Bologna – 1991–95, 1996–2001 ( (Soviet Union) while active)
- Aleksei Miranchuk – Atalanta, Torino – 2020–24
- Ruslan Nigmatullin – Verona – 2001–02
- Igor Shalimov – Foggia, Inter, Udinese, Bologna – 1991–94, 1995–98 ( (Soviet Union) while active)
- Igor Simutenkov – Reggiana, Bologna – 1994–95, 1996–97, 1998–99
- Omari Tetradze – Roma – 1996–98

=== San Marino ===
- Massimo Bonini – Juventus, Bologna – 1981–91
- Marco Macina – Bologna, Milan – 1981–82, 1985–86

=== Scotland ===
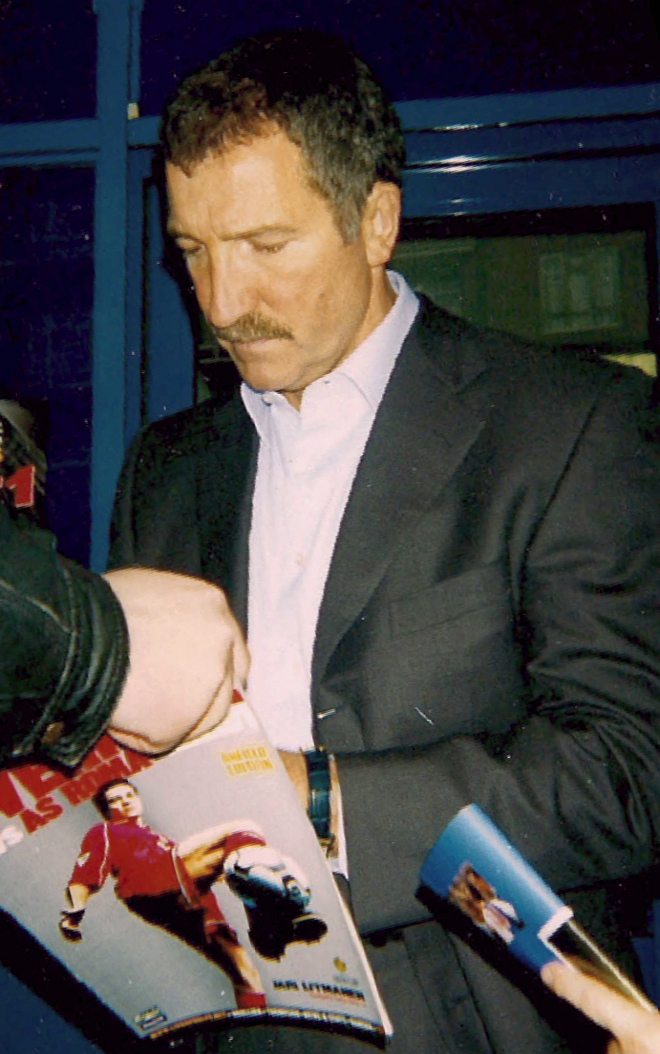
Graeme Souness in 2001

- **Ché Adams** – **Torino** – 2024–
- Luis Binks – Bologna – 2021–22
- **Kieron Bowie** – Verona, **Sassuolo** – 2025–
- **Josh Doig** – Verona, **Sassuolo** – 2022–24, 2025–
- **Lewis Ferguson** – **Bologna** – 2022–
- **Billy Gilmour** – **Napoli** – 2024–
- Liam Henderson – Verona, Empoli – 2019–20, 2021–25
- Jack Hendry – Cremonese – 2022–23
- Aaron Hickey – Bologna – 2020–22
- Joe Jordan – Milan, Verona – 1981–82, 1983–84
- Denis Law – Torino – 1961–62
- **Lennon Miller** – **Udinese** – 2025–
- **Scott McTominay** – **Napoli** – 2024–
- **Nathan Patterson** – **Torino** – 2026–
- Graeme Souness – Sampdoria – 1984–86

=== Serbia ===
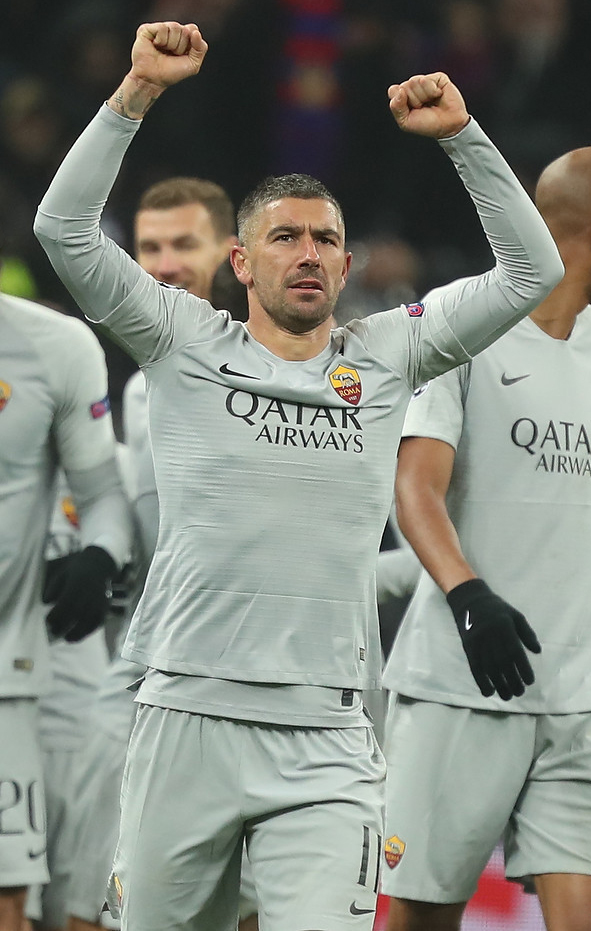
Aleksandar Kolarov played for both of the Capital teams

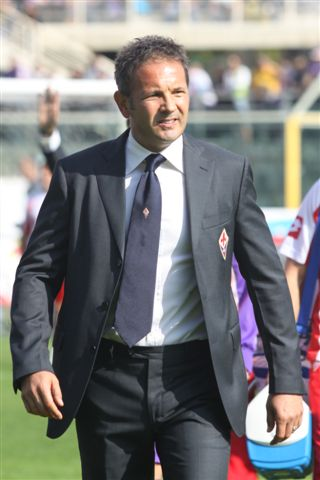
Siniša Mihajlović as Fiorentina head coach in 2010. As player he was a free kick specialist. He scored a record 28 goals from free kicks in Serie A.

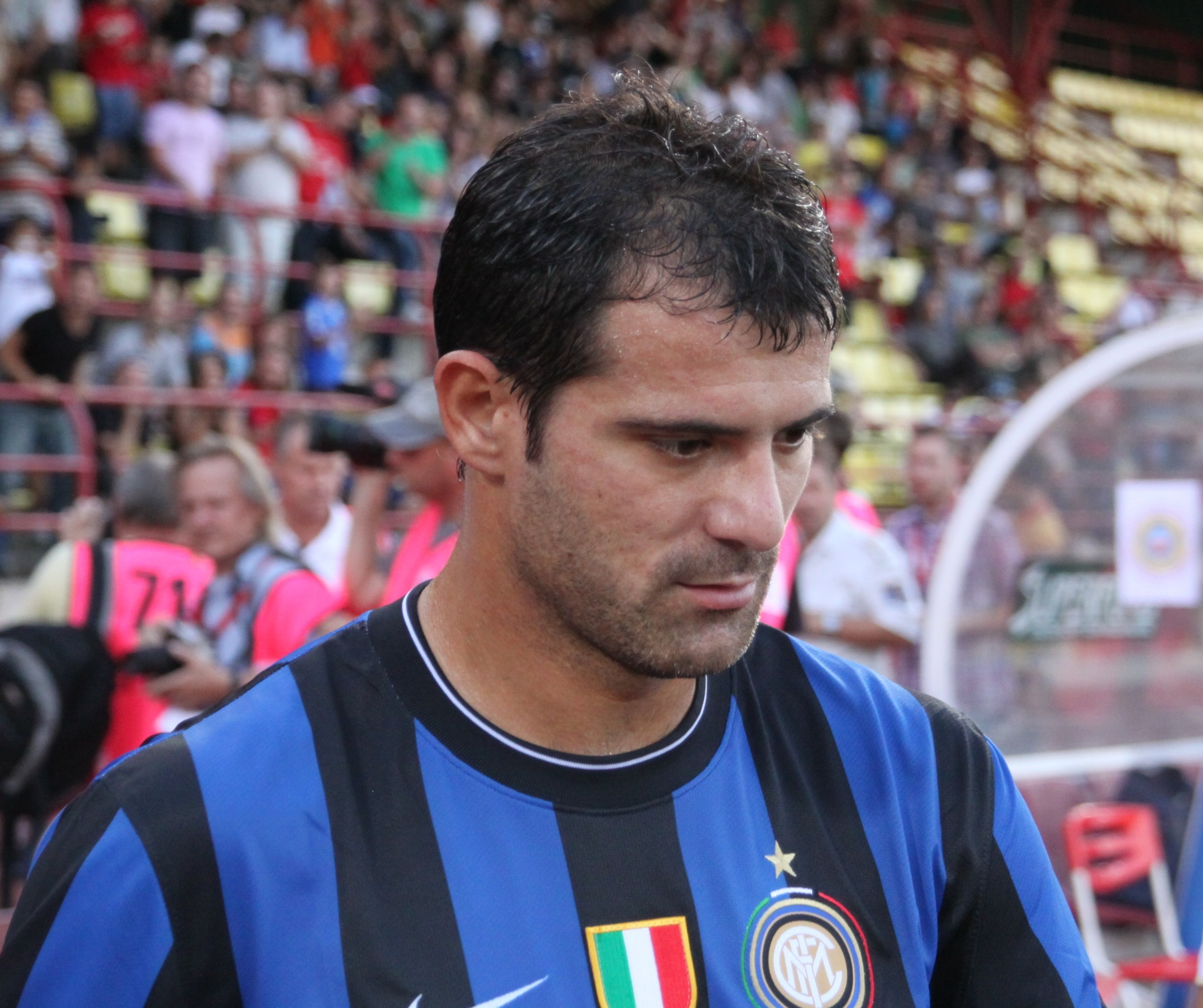
Dejan Stanković with Inter. He won five championships with Inter and one with Lazio, also lifting the treble with Inter in 2010.

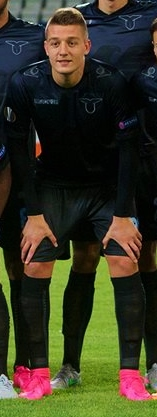
Sergej Milinković-Savić made over 250 Serie A appearances for Lazio

- Danijel Aleksić – Genoa – 2009–10
- Aleksandar Aranđelović – Padova, Roma, Novara – 1948–51 ( (Socialist Federal Republic of Yugoslavia) while active)
- Vlada Avramov – Fiorentina, Cagliari, Atalanta – 2007–08, 2009–15
- Dušan Basta – Lecce, Udinese, Lazio – 2008–10, 2011–18
- Milan Biševac – Lazio – 2015–16
- Dražen Bolić – Salernitana, Ancona – 1998–99, 2003–04 ( (Serbia and Montenegro) while active)
- Vujadin Boškov – Sampdoria – 1961–62 ( (Socialist Federal Republic of Yugoslavia) while active)
- Željko Brkić – Siena, Udinese, Cagliari, Carpi – 2011–16
- Uroš Ćosić – Pescara, Empoli – 2012–13, 2015–17
- Borislav Cvetković – Ascoli – 1988–90 ( (Socialist Federal Republic of Yugoslavia) while active)
- Miloš Dimitrijević – Chievo – 2010–11
- Filip Đorđević – Lazio, Chievo – 2014–17, 2018–19
- Filip Đuričić – Sampdoria, Benevento, Sassuolo – 2016–23
- Vladislav Đukić – Cesena – 1989–90 ( (Socialist Federal Republic of Yugoslavia) while active)
- Ljubiša Dunđerski – Atalanta – 1997–98, 2000–01 ( (Federal Republic of Yugoslavia) while active)
- Vladimir Golemić – Crotone – 2020–21
- Nikola Gulan – Fiorentina, Chievo – 2010–12
- Dejan Govedarica – Lecce – 1997–98 ( (Federal Republic of Yugoslavia) while active)
- **Ivan Ilić** – Verona, Torino, **Lecce** – 2020–
- Ivica Iliev – Messina – 2004–07 ( (Serbia and Montenegro) while active)
- Mihailo Ivanović – Sampdoria – 2022–23
- Ilija Ivić – Torino – 1999–2000 ( (Federal Republic of Yugoslavia) while active)
- Boško Janković – Palermo, Genoa, Verona – 2007–16
- **Lazar Jovanović** – **Udinese** – 2026–
- Luka Jović – Fiorentina, Milan – 2022–25
- Vladimir Jugović – Sampdoria, Juventus, Lazio, Inter – 1992–98, 1999–2001 ( (Federal Republic of Yugoslavia) while active)
- Tomislav Kaloperović – Padova – 1961–62 ( (Socialist Federal Republic of Yugoslavia) while active)
- Dimitrije Kamenović – Lazio – 2021–22
- Aleksandar Kocić – Perugia, Empoli – 1996–98 ( (Federal Republic of Yugoslavia) while active)
- Aleksandar Kolarov – Lazio, Roma, Inter – 2007–10, 2017–22
- Bora Kostić – Vicenza – 1961–62 ( (Socialist Federal Republic of Yugoslavia) while active)
- Filip Kostić – Juventus – 2022–24, 2025–26
- Darko Kovačević – Juventus, Lazio – 1999–2002 ( (Federal Republic of Yugoslavia) while active)
- Miloš Krasić – Juventus – 2010–12
- Aleksandar Kristić – Salernitana – 1998–99 ( (Federal Republic of Yugoslavia) while active)
- Nenad Krstičić – Sampdoria – 2012–16
- Zdravko Kuzmanović – Fiorentina, Inter, Udinese – 2006–09, 2012–16
- Marko Lazetić – Milan – 2022–23
- Nikola Lazetić – Chievo, Lazio, Siena, Livorno, Torino – 2002–04, 2005–08 ( (Serbia and Montenegro) while active)
- Darko Lazović – Genoa, Verona – 2015–25
- Stefan Leković – Monza – 2024–25
- Adem Ljajić – Fiorentina, Roma, Inter, Torino – 2009–19
- Saša Lukić – Torino – 2016–17, 2018–23
- Aleksandar Luković – Ascoli, Udinese – 2006–10
- Nikola Maksimović – Torino, Napoli, Genoa – 2013–22
- Petar Manola – Lazio – 1942–43, 1945–47 ( (Socialist Federal Republic of Yugoslavia) while active)
- Petar Mićin – Udinese – 2018–19, 2020–21
- **Nemanja Matić** – Roma, **Sassuolo** – 2022–23, 2025–
- Siniša Mihajlović – Roma, Sampdoria, Lazio, Inter – 1992–2006 ( (Serbia and Montenegro) while active)
- Bratislav Mijalković – Perugia – 1996–97 ( (Federal Republic of Yugoslavia) while active)
- Milan Milanović – Palermo – 2011–12
- Nikola Milenković – Fiorentina – 2017–24
- Sergej Milinković-Savić – Lazio – 2015–23
- **Vanja Milinković-Savić** – Torino, SPAL, **Napoli** – 2017–19, 2020–
- Savo Milošević – Parma – 2000–02 ( (Federal Republic of Yugoslavia) while active)
- Zoran Mirković – Atalanta, Juventus – 1996–2000 ( (Federal Republic of Yugoslavia) while active)
- Stefan Mitrović – Verona – 2023–24
- Matija Nastasić – Fiorentina – 2011–13, 2021–22
- Nikola Ninković – Chievo, Genoa – 2015–17
- Nenad Novaković – Reggina – 2007–08
- **Strahinja Pavlović** – **Milan** – 2024–
- Marko Perović – Cremonese, Ancona – 1995–96, 2003–04 ( (Serbia and Montenegro) while active)
- Aleksandar Pešić – Atalanta – 2016–17
- Dejan Petković – Venezia – 1999–2000 ( (Federal Republic of Yugoslavia) while active)
- Aleksandar Prijović – Parma – 2007–08
- Uroš Račić – Sassuolo – 2023–24
- Nemanja Radonjić – Torino – 2022–24
- Ivan Radovanović – Atalanta, Bologna, Novara, Chievo, Genoa, Salernitana – 2009–23
- Boris Radunović – Atalanta, Verona, Cagliari – 2015–16, 2019–20, 2021–22, 2023–24
- Slobodan Rajković – Palermo – 2016–17
- Đorđe Rakić – Reggina – 2008–09
- Petar Ratkov – Lazio – 2025–26
- Nenad Sakić – Lecce, Sampdoria – 1997–99 ( (Federal Republic of Yugoslavia) while active)
- **Lazar Samardžić** – Udinese, **Atalanta** – 2021–
- Stefan Šćepović – Sampdoria – 2009–10
- Jan-Carlo Simić – Milan – 2023–24
- Vlado Šmit – Bologna – 2002–03 ( (Federal Republic of Yugoslavia) while active)
- **Aleksandar Stanković** – **Inter** – 2026–
- Dejan Stanković – Lazio, Inter – 1998–2013 ( (Serbia and Montenegro) while active)
- **Filip Stanković** – **Venezia** – 2024–25, 2026–
- Alen Stevanović – Inter, Torino, – 2009–10, 2012–13
- Damir Stojak – Napoli – 1997–98, 2000–01 ( (Federal Republic of Yugoslavia) while active)
- Dragan Stojković – Verona – 1991–92 ( (Socialist Federal Republic of Yugoslavia) while active)
- **Nikola Štulić** – **Lecce** – 2025–
- **Mile Svilar** – **Roma** – 2022–
- Strahinja Tanasijević – Chievo – 2018–19
- **Aleksa Terzić** – Fiorentina, **Frosinone** – 2019–20, 2021–23, 2026–
- Ivan Tomić – Roma – 1998–2000, 2001–03 ( (Federal Republic of Yugoslavia) while active)
- Nenad Tomović – Genoa, Lecce, Fiorentina, Chievo, SPAL – 2009–20
- Aleksandar Trifunović – Ascoli – 1983–84, 1986–87 ( (Socialist Federal Republic of Yugoslavia) while active)
- Todor Veselinović – Sampdoria – 1961–62 ( (Socialist Federal Republic of Yugoslavia) while active)
- Nemanja Vidić – Inter – 2014–15
- Dušan Vlahović – Fiorentina, Juventus – 2018–26
- Vanja Vlahović – Atalanta – 2024–25
- Jagoš Vuković – Verona – 2017–18
- Miloš Vulić – Crotone – 2020–21
- Bratislav Živković – Sampdoria – 1998–99, 2003–04 ( (Serbia and Montenegro) while active)

=== Slovakia ===
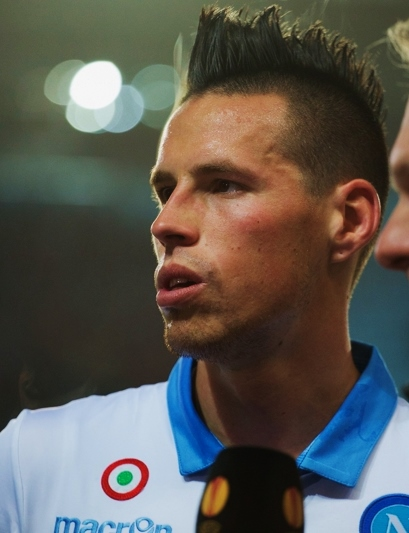
Marek Hamšík was formerly Napoli's all-time top goalscorer

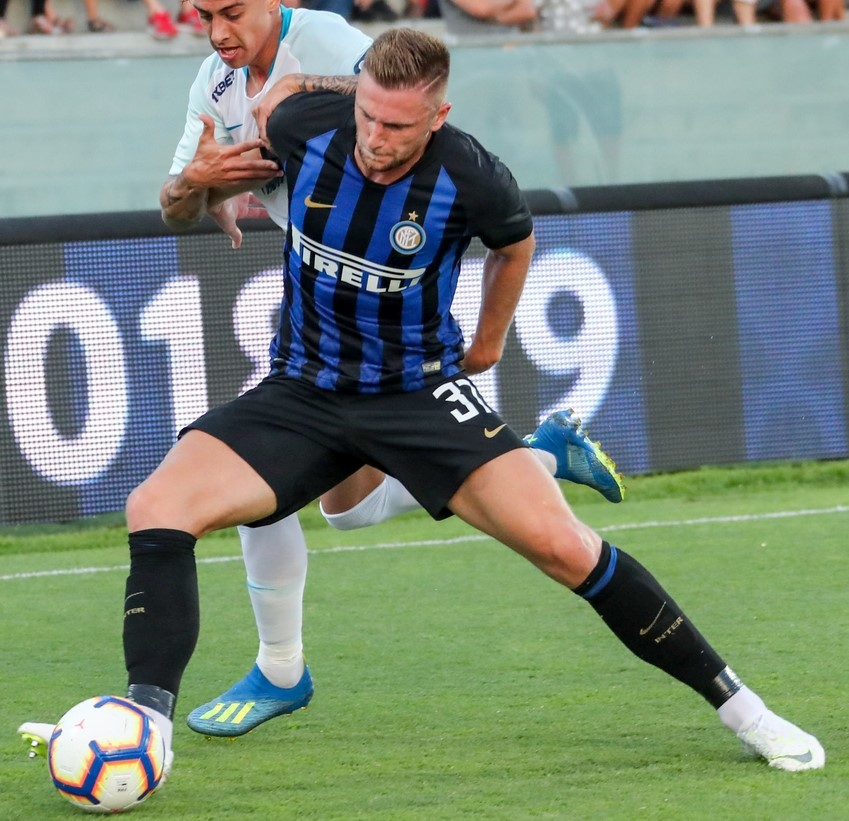
Milan Škriniar playing for Inter

- Ján Arpáš – Juventus – 1947–48 ( (Czechoslovakia) while active)
- Pavol Bajza – Parma – 2012–14
- **Tomáš Bobček** – **Frosinone** – 2026–
- Marek Čech – Bologna – 2013–14
- János Chawko – Palermo, Como – 1948–50 ( (Czechoslovakia) while active)
- Ondrej Duda – Verona – 2022–25
- Pavol Farkaš – Chievo – 2012–13
- Miloš Glonek – Ancona – 1992–93 ( (Czechoslovakia) while active)
- Vratislav Greško – Inter, Parma – 2000–03
- Norbert Gyömbér – Catania, Roma, Pescara, Salernitana – 2013–14, 2015–17, 2021–24
- Marek Hamšík – Brescia, Napoli – 2004–05, 2007–19
- Dávid Hancko – Fiorentina – 2018–19
- Lukáš Haraslín – Parma, Sassuolo – 2014–15, 2019–21
- David Ivan – Sampdoria – 2015–16
- Kamil Kopúnek – Bari – 2010–11
- Július Korostelev – Juventus, Atalanta – 1946–49 ( (Czechoslovakia) while active)
- Tomáš Košický – Catania – 2008–12
- Matej Krajčík – Reggina – 2008–09
- Juraj Kucka – Genoa, Milan, Parma – 2010–17, 2018–21
- **Stanislav Lobotka** – **Napoli** – 2019–
- Samuel Mráz – Empoli, Spezia – 2018–19, 2021–22
- **Adam Obert** – **Cagliari** – 2021–22, 2023–
- Július Schubert – Torino – 1948–49 ( (Czechoslovakia) while active)
- Milan Škriniar – Sampdoria, Inter – 2015–23
- Nikolas Špalek – Brescia – 2019–20
- Dávid Strelec – Spezia – 2021–23
- Tomáš Suslov – Verona – 2023–26
- Ľubomír Tupta – Verona – 2017–18, 2020–21
- Blažej Vašcák – Treviso – 2005–06
- Denis Vavro – Lazio – 2019–22
- Vladimír Weiss – Pescara – 2012–13
- Adam Žulevič – Genoa – 2026–27

=== Slovenia ===
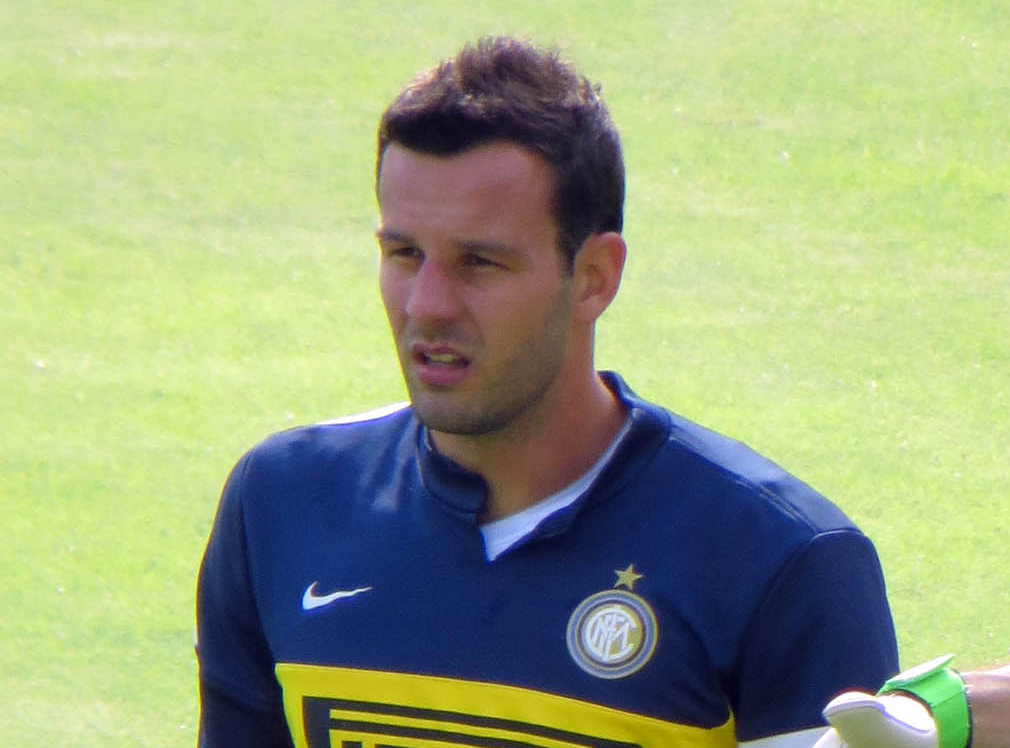
Samir Handanović training with Inter

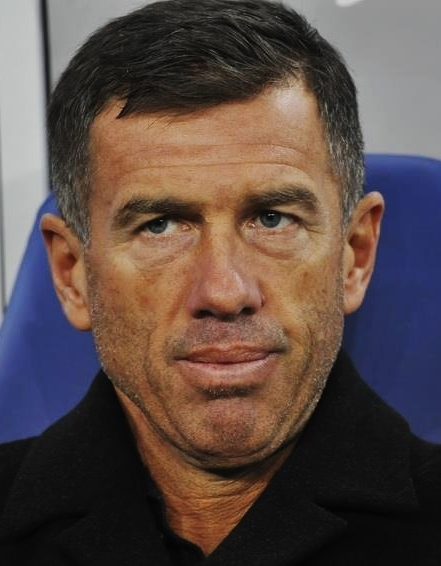
Srečko Katanec in 2015, he had an important role in the Sampdoria team that won the 1990–91 Scudetto.

- Siniša Anđelković – Palermo – 2010–11, 2014–17
- Armin Bačinović – Palermo – 2010–12
- Tjaš Begić – Parma – 2025–26
- Vid Belec – Carpi, Benevento, Sampdoria, Salernitana – 2015–16, 2017–18, 2021–22
- Jaka Bijol – Udinese – 2022–25
- Valter Birsa – Genoa, Torino, Milan, Chievo, Cagliari – 2011–20
- Žan Celar – Roma – 2018–19
- Boštjan Cesar – Chievo – 2010–19
- Sebastjan Cimirotič – Lecce – 2001–02
- Tio Cipot – Spezia – 2022–23
- Domen Črnigoj – Venezia, Salernitana – 2021–23, 2024–25
- Zlatko Dedić – Parma – 2005–07
- **Dominik Drobnic** – **Parma** – 2026–
- Robert Englaro – Atalanta – 1997–98
- Matjaž Florjančič – Cremonese, Empoli – 1991–92, 1993–96, 1997–98
- Samir Handanović – Udinese, Treviso, Lazio, Inter – 2004–06, 2007–23
- Josip Iličić – Palermo, Fiorentina, Atalanta – 2010–22
- Enej Jelenič – Genoa – 2010–11
- Bojan Jokić – Chievo – 2009–13
- Srečko Katanec – Sampdoria – 1989–94 ( (Socialist Federal Republic of Yugoslavia) while active)
- Jan Koprivec – Udinese – 2008–09
- Andrej Kotnik – Crotone – 2016–17
- Luka Krajnc – Genoa, Cesena, Frosinone – 2012–13, 2014–15, 2018–19
- Rene Krhin – Inter, Bologna – 2009–15
- Jasmin Kurtić – Palermo, Sassuolo, Torino, Fiorentina, Atalanta, SPAL, Parma – 2010–11, 2012–21
- Dejan Lazarević – Genoa, Chievo, Sassuolo – 2009–10, 2013–15
- **Sandi Lovrić** – **Udinese**, Verona – 2022–
- Žan Majer – Lecce – 2019–20
- Tim Matavž – Genoa – 2015–16
- Jan Mlakar – Fiorentina – 2016–17
- **Relja Obrić** – **Atalanta** – 2026–
- Petar Stojanović – Empoli – 2021–23, 2024–25
- Aljaž Struna – Palermo – 2015–16
- Leo Štulac – Parma, Empoli – 2018–19, 2021–22
- Luka Topalović – Inter – 2024–26
- Martin Turk – Sampdoria – 2022–23
- Miha Zajc – Empoli, Genoa – 2016–17, 2018–19, 2020–21

=== Spain ===
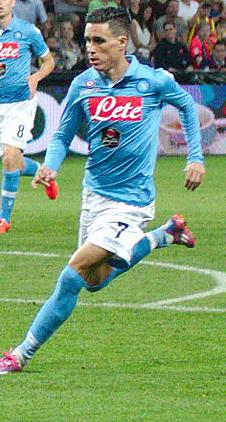
José Callejón playing for Napoli in 2014

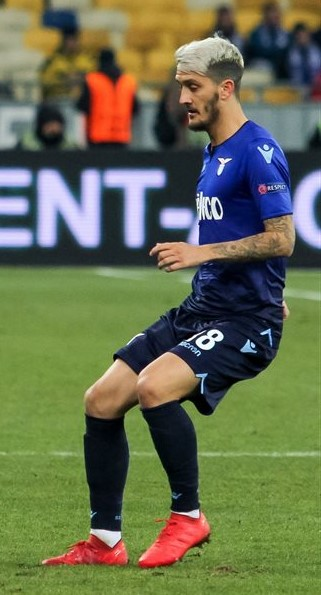
Luis Alberto playing for Lazio in 2018

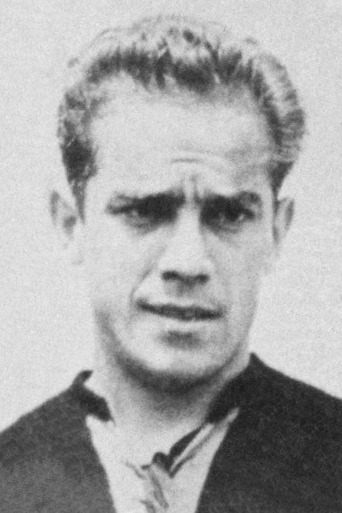
Luis Suárez, a legend of Inter, club where he played and that he trained

- Antonio Adán – Cagliari – 2013–14
- Raúl Albiol – Napoli, Pisa – 2013–19, 2025–26
- Marcos Alonso – Fiorentina – 2013–17
- Guillermo Amor – Fiorentina – 1998–2000
- Angeliño – Roma – 2023–26
- Álex Berenguer – Torino – 2017–21
- **Adrián Bernabé** – **Parma** – 2024–
- Bojan – Roma, Milan – 2011–13
- Borja Valero – Fiorentina, Inter – 2012–21
- Borja Mayoral – Roma – 2020–22
- Iker Bravo – Udinese – 2024–26
- José Callejón – Napoli, Fiorentina – 2013–22
- Toni Calvo – Parma – 2010–11
- Diego Capel – Genoa – 2015–16
- **Kevin Carlos** – **Cagliari** – 2026–
- Samu Castillejo – Milan, Sassuolo – 2018–22, 2023–24
- Chico Flores – Genoa – 2010–11
- José Ángel Crespo – Bologna – 2011–12, 2013–14
- Iván de la Peña – Lazio – 1998–99, 2001–02
- Luis del Sol – Juventus, Roma – 1962–72
- Roberto Delgado – Lazio – 2003–05
- **David de Gea** – **Fiorentina** – 2024–
- Gerard Deulofeu – Milan, Udinese – 2016–17, 2020–23
- **Ousmane Diallo** – **Parma** – 2026–
- Toni Doblas – Napoli – 2013–14
- **Paco Esteban** – **Lecce** – 2026–
- Iago Falque – Genoa, Roma, Torino, Benevento – 2014–21
- **Lamine Fanne** – **Venezia** – 2026–
- Javier Farinós – Inter – 2000–04
- **Toni Fernández** – **Venezia** – 2026–
- Salva Ferrer – Spezia – 2020–23
- Ricardo Gallego – Udinese – 1989–90
- Javier Garrido – Lazio – 2010–12
- Alexandre Geijo – Udinese – 2009–10, 2014–15
- **Mario Gila** – Lazio, **Milan** – 2022–
- César Gómez – Roma – 1997–98
- **Unai Gómez** – **Udinese** – 2026–
- Joan González – Lecce – 2022–24
- Pep Guardiola – Brescia, Roma – 2001–03
- Miguel Gutiérrez – Napoli – 2025–26
- Iván Helguera – Roma – 1997–98
- Luis Helguera – Udinese, Ancona – 2000–02, 2003–04
- **Mario Hermoso** – **Roma** – 2024–
- Dean Huijsen – Juventus, Roma – 2023–24
- **Álex Jiménez** – Milan, **Fiorentina** – 2023–
- Joaquín – Fiorentina – 2013–15
- Jony – Lazio – 2019–20
- José Ángel Valdés – Roma – 2011–12
- Keko – Catania – 2012–14
- Pol Lirola – Sassuolo, Fiorentina, Frosinone, Verona – 2016–21, 2023–24, 2025–26
- Diego Llorente – Roma – 2022–24
- Fernando Llorente – Juventus, Napoli, Udinese – 2013–16, 2019–21
- David López – Napoli – 2014–16
- Diego López – Milan – 2014–16
- Óscar López – Lazio – 2004–05
- Pau López – Roma – 2019–21
- Luis Alberto – Lazio – 2016–24
- Iván Marcano – Roma – 2018–19
- José Mari – Milan – 1999–2002
- Pablo Marí – Udinese, Monza, Fiorentina – 2021–26
- **Rafa Marín** – **Napoli** – 2024–25, 2026–
- Fernando Marqués – Parma – 2010–12
- Aarón Martín – Genoa – 2023–26
- Rafael Martín Vázquez – Torino – 1990–92
- **Josep Martínez** – Genoa, **Inter** – 2023–
- Gaizka Mendieta – Lazio – 2001–02
- Michu – Napoli – 2014–15
- **Luis Milla** – **Como** – 2026–
- **Juan Miranda** – **Bologna** – 2024–
- Tòfol Montiel – Fiorentina – 2018–19, 2020–21
- Martín Montoya – Inter – 2015–16
- Álvaro Morata – Juventus, Milan, Como – 2014–16, 2020–22, 2024–26
- Alberto Moreno – Como – 2024–26
- Javi Moreno – Milan – 2001–02
- Tete Morente – Lecce – 2024–26
- Raúl Moro – Lazio – 2019–22
- Víctor Muñoz – Sampdoria – 1988–90
- Unai Núñez – Verona – 2025–26
- **Rafael Obrador** – Torino, **Sassuolo** – 2025–
- Álvaro Odriozola – Fiorentina – 2021–22
- Patric – Lazio – 2015–26
- **Alfonso Pedraza** – **Lazio** – 2026–
- Pedro – Roma, Lazio – 2020–26
- Estanis Pedrola – Bologna – 2024–25
- Joaquín Peiró – Torino, Inter, Roma – 1962–70
- Carles Pérez – Roma – 2019–22
- **Kike Pérez** – **Venezia** – 2024–25, 2026–
- Javier Portillo – Fiorentina – 2004–05
- **Jacobo Ramón** – **Como** – 2025–
- Pepe Reina – Napoli, Milan, Lazio, Como – 2013–14, 2015–22, 2024–25
- Martí Riverola – Bologna – 2012–13
- Sergi Roberto – Como – 2024–26
- Alejandro Rodríguez – Cesena, Sampdoria, Empoli – 2010–11, 2014–16, 2018–19
- Jesé Rodríguez – Sampdoria – 2022–23
- **Jesús Rodríguez** – **Como** – 2025–
- Pablo Rodríguez – Lecce – 2022–23
- Jaime Romero – Udinese, Bari – 2009–11
- Rubén Pérez – Torino – 2014–15
- Fabián Ruiz – Napoli – 2018–22
- Víctor Ruiz – Napoli – 2010–11
- Christian Rutjens – Benevento – 2017–18
- Álex Sala – Lecce – 2025–26
- **Robert Sánchez** – **Como** – 2026–
- Yellu Santiago – Verona – 2025–26
- Juan Santisteban – Venezia – 1961–63
- Luis Suárez – Inter, Sampdoria – 1961–73
- Mario Suárez – Fiorentina – 2015–16
- Suso – Milan, Genoa – 2014–20
- Cristian Tello – Fiorentina – 2015–17
- Fernando Torres – Milan – 2014–15
- Diego Tristán – Livorno – 2007–08
- **Víctor Valdepeñas** – **Fiorentina** – 2026–
- **Álex Valle** – **Como** – 2024–
- Joan Verdú – Fiorentina – 2015–16
- Dídac Vilà – Milan – 2010–11
- Gonzalo Villar – Roma, Sampdoria – 2019–21, 2022–23
- Gerard Yepes – Sampdoria – 2021–23
- Alberto Zapater – Genoa – 2009–10
- Bryan Zaragoza – Roma – 2025–26
- **Oier Zarraga** – **Udinese** – 2023–

=== Switzerland ===
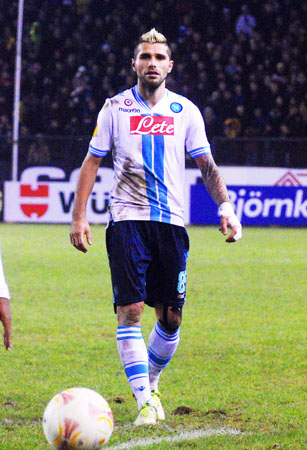
Valon Behrami playing for Napoli

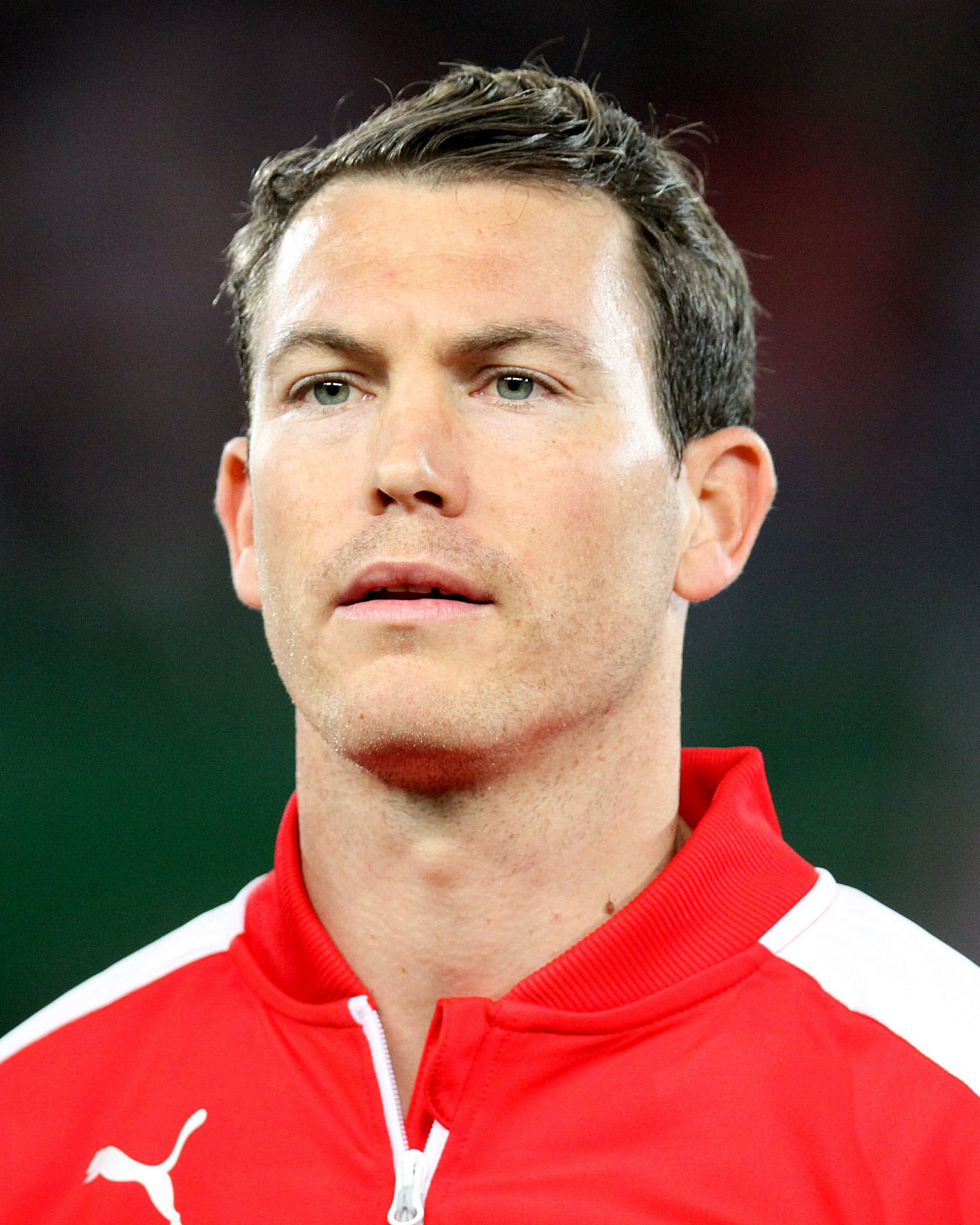
Stephan Lichtsteiner won 7 consecutives leagues with Juventus between 2011 and 2018

- Almen Abdi – Udinese – 2010–12
- Michel Aebischer – Bologna, Pisa – 2021–26
- **Manuel Akanji** – **Inter** – 2025–
- Toni Allemann – Mantova – 1961–63
- Zachary Athekame – Milan – 2025–26
- Steve von Bergen – Cesena, Palermo – 2010–13
- Valon Behrami – Lazio, Fiorentina, Napoli, Udinese, Genoa – 2005–08, 2010–14, 2017–22
- Gaetano Berardi – Brescia, Sampdoria – 2010–11, 2012–14
- Patrick Bettoni – Vicenza – 1998–99
- **Sascha Britschgi** – **Parma** – 2025–
- Davide Chiumiento – Juventus, Siena – 2003–05
- **Eray Cömert** – **Torino** – 2026–
- Fabio Daprelà – Brescia, Palermo, Carpi – 2010–11, 2014–16
- Daniel Denoon – Pisa – 2025–26
- Johan Djourou – SPAL – 2018–19
- Blerim Džemaili – Torino, Parma, Napoli, Genoa, Bologna – 2008–14, 2015–20
- Innocent Emeghara – Siena, Livorno – 2012–14
- Matteo Fedele – Carpi – 2015–16
- Edimilson Fernandes – Fiorentina – 2018–19
- Gélson Fernandes – Chievo, Udinese – 2010–12
- Remo Freuler – Atalanta, Bologna – 2015–22, 2023–26
- Philippe Fuchs – Padova – 1948–52
- Ulisses Garcia – Sassuolo – 2025–26
- Simone Grippo – Chievo – 2008–09
- Nicolas Haas – Atalanta, Empoli – 2017–18, 2021–25
- Silvan Hefti – Genoa – 2021–22, 2023–24
- Gökhan Inler – Udinese, Napoli – 2007–15
- **Ardon Jashari** – **Milan** – 2025–
- Pajtim Kasami – Palermo – 2010–11
- Stephan Lichtsteiner – Lazio, Juventus – 2008–18
- Cephas Malele – Palermo – 2012–13
- Giuseppe Mazzarelli – Bari – 2000–01
- **Ethan Meichtry** – **Genoa** – 2026–
- **Joël Monteiro** – **Lecce** – 2026–
- Michel Morganella – Palermo, Novara – 2008–09, 2011–13, 2014–17
- Bruno Mota – Sampdoria – 2006–07
- Dan Ndoye – Bologna – 2023–25
- Alain Nef – Udinese – 2008–09
- Dimitri Oberlin – Empoli – 2018–19
- Noah Okafor – Milan, Napoli – 2023–25
- Marco Padalino – Sampdoria – 2008–11
- Marco Pascolo – Cagliari – 1996–97
- **Ricardo Rodríguez** – Milan, **Torino** – 2017–24, 2026–
- Jonathan Rossini – Sampdoria, Sassuolo – 2012–14
- Kevin Rüegg – Verona – 2020–21
- Anđelko Savić – Sampdoria – 2012–13
- Haris Seferovic – Fiorentina, Lecce – 2010–13
- Philippe Senderos – Milan – 2008–09
- David Sesa – Lecce, Napoli – 1999–2001
- Ciriaco Sforza – Inter – 1996–97
- Xherdan Shaqiri – Inter – 2014–15
- Benjamin Siegrist – Genoa – 2024–25
- **Vincent Sierro** – **Parma** – 2026–
- **Simon Sohm** – Parma, Fiorentina, Bologna, **Venezia** – 2020–21, 2024–
- Yann Sommer – Inter – 2023–26
- **Djibril Sow** – **Genoa** – 2026–
- Filip Stojilković – Pisa – 2025–26
- Kubilay Türkyılmaz – Bologna, Brescia – 1990–91, 2000–01
- Ramon Vega – Cagliari – 1996–97
- Johann Vogel – Milan – 2005–06
- Johan Vonlanthen – Brescia – 2004–05
- Roger Vonlanthen – Inter, Alessandria – 1955–59
- Silvan Widmer – Udinese – 2013–18
- Denis Zakaria – Juventus – 2021–23
- Fabrizio Zambrella – Brescia – 2004–05
- Reto Ziegler – Sampdoria, Sassuolo – 2006–11, 2013–14

=== Turkey ===
- Kaan Ayhan – Sassuolo – 2020–23
- **Hakan Çalhanoğlu** – Milan, **Inter** – 2017–
- **Zeki Çelik** – Roma, **Juventus** – 2022–
- Mert Çetin – Roma, Verona, Lecce – 2019–23
- Ümit Davala – Milan – 2001–02
- Merih Demiral – Sassuolo, Juventus, Atalanta – 2018–23
- Bülent Esel – Spal – 1951–54
- Bülent Eken – Palermo – 1951–52
- Can Bartu – Fiorentina, Venezia, Lazio – 1961–67
- Emre Belözoğlu – Inter – 2001–05
- Hakan Şükür – Torino, Inter, Parma – 1995–96, 2000–02
- **Emirhan İlkhan** – **Torino**, Sampdoria – 2022–23, 2025–
- Semih Kılıçsoy – Cagliari – 2025–26
- Lefter Küçükandonyadis – Fiorentina – 1951–52
- Berkan Kutlu – Genoa – 2023–24
- Mert Müldür – Sassuolo – 2019–23
- Metin Oktay – Palermo – 1961–62
- Okan Buruk – Inter – 2001–04
- Şükrü Gülesin – Palermo, Lazio – 1950–53
- Salih Uçan – Roma, Empoli – 2014–16, 2018–19
- Cengiz Ünder – Roma – 2017–20
- İsak Vural – Pisa – 2025–26
- **Kenan Yıldız** – **Juventus** – 2023–

=== Ukraine ===
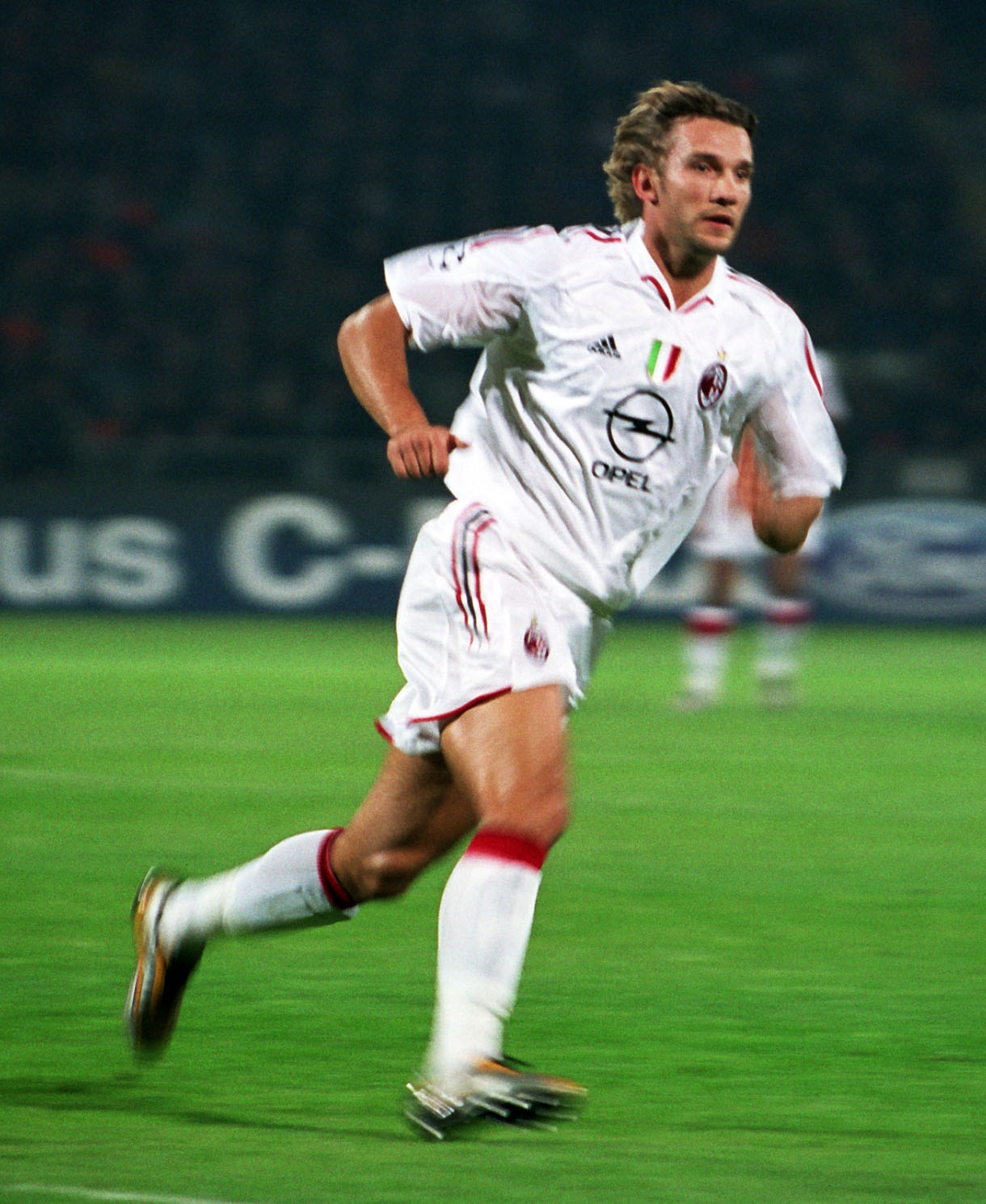
Andriy Shevchenko won the Ballon d'Or while at Milan in 2004

- Serhiy Atelkin – Lecce – 1997–98
- **Artem Dovbyk** – Roma, **Bologna** – 2024–
- Viktor Kovalenko – Atalanta, Spezia, Empoli – 2020–25
- Ruslan Malinovskyi – Atalanta, Genoa – 2019–26
- Alexei Mikhailichenko – Sampdoria – 1990–91 ( (Soviet Union) while active)
- Andriy Shevchenko – Milan – 1999–2006, 2008–09
- Oleksandr Yakovenko – Fiorentina – 2013–14
- Vasyl Pryima – Frosinone – 2015–16
- Yevhen Shakhov – Lecce – 2019–20
- Vladyslav Supryaha – Sampdoria – 2021–22
- Aleksandr Zavarov – Juventus – 1988–90 ( (Soviet Union) while active)

=== Wales ===
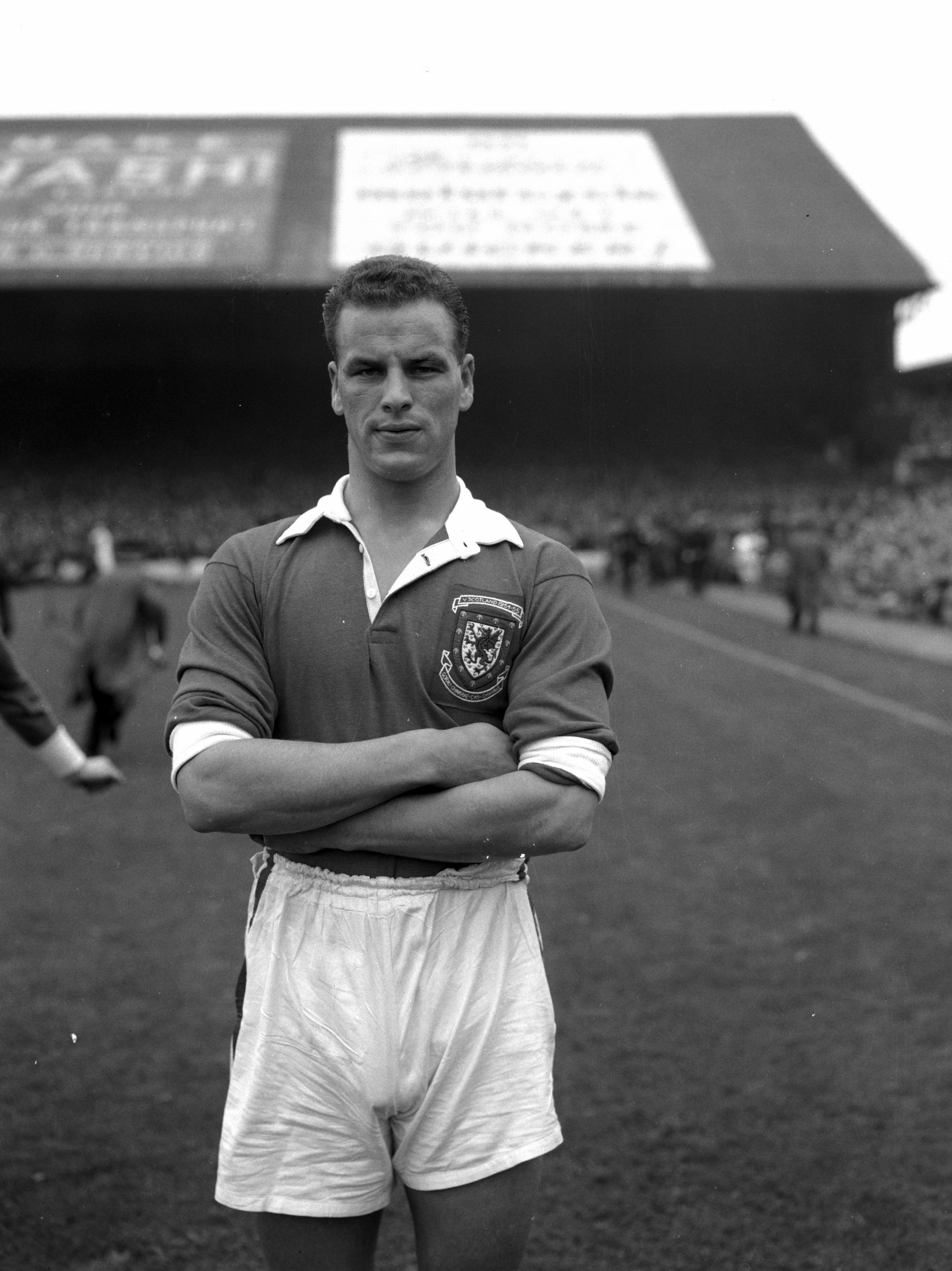
John Charles

- Ethan Ampadu – Venezia, Spezia – 2021–23
- John Charles – Juventus, Roma – 1957–63
- Aaron Ramsey – Juventus – 2019–22
- Ian Rush – Juventus – 1987–88

== North, Central America and Caribbean (CONCACAF) ==
=== Canada ===
- Tajon Buchanan – Inter – 2023–25
- Jonathan David – Juventus – 2025–27
- **Ismaël Koné** – **Sassuolo** – 2025–

=== Costa Rica ===
- Joel Campbell – Frosinone – 2018–19
- Giancarlo González – Palermo, Bologna – 2014–19
- Gilberto Martínez – Brescia, Sampdoria – 2002–05, 2010–11
- Hernán Medford – Foggia – 1992–93

=== Dominican Republic ===
- Antonio Santurro – Bologna – 2017–18
- Vinicio Espinal – Atalanta – 2000–03
- José Espinal – Atalanta – 2000–01

=== El Salvador ===
- Joshua Pérez – Fiorentina – 2016–17

=== Guadeloupe ===
- Jocelyn Angloma – Torino, Inter – 1994–97
- Andreaw Gravillon – Benevento, Torino – 2017–18, 2022–23

=== Honduras ===
- Edgar Álvarez – Cagliari, Roma, Messina, Livorno, Bari, Palermo – 2004–08, 2009–12
- Samuel Caballero – Udinese – 2001–03
- Julio César de León – Reggina, Genoa – 2002–04, 2006–08
- Carlos Pavón – Udinese – 2001–02
- David Suazo – Cagliari, Inter, Genoa, Catania – 1999–2000, 2004–08, 2009–10, 2011–12

=== Jamaica ===
- Rolando Aarons – Verona – 2017–18
- Leon Bailey – Roma – 2025–26
- Ravel Morrison – Lazio – 2015–16
- Trivante Stewart – Salernitana – 2023–24

=== Martinique ===
- Janis Antiste – Spezia, Sassuolo – 2021–23
- Emmanuel Rivière – Crotone – 2020–21

=== Mexico ===
- Santiago Giménez – Milan – 2024–26
- Miguel Layún – Atalanta – 2009–10
- Hirving Lozano – Napoli – 2019–23
- Rafael Márquez – Verona – 2014–16
- Héctor Moreno – Roma – 2017–18
- Guillermo Ochoa – Salernitana – 2022–24
- Carlos Salcedo – Fiorentina – 2016–17
- **Johan Vásquez** – **Genoa**, Cremonese – 2021–

=== Panama ===
- Julio Dely Valdés – Cagliari – 1993–95

=== Saint Martin (Collectivity of Saint Martin) ===
- Wilfried Dalmat – Lecce – 2003–04

=== Suriname ===
- Djavan Anderson – Lazio – 2019–21
- **Cheveyo Balentien** – **Milan** – 2025–
- Denilho Cleonise – Genoa – 2019–20
- Stefano Denswil – Bologna – 2019–21
- **Ridgeciano Haps** – **Venezia**, Genoa – 2021–22, 2023–25, 2026–

=== United States ===
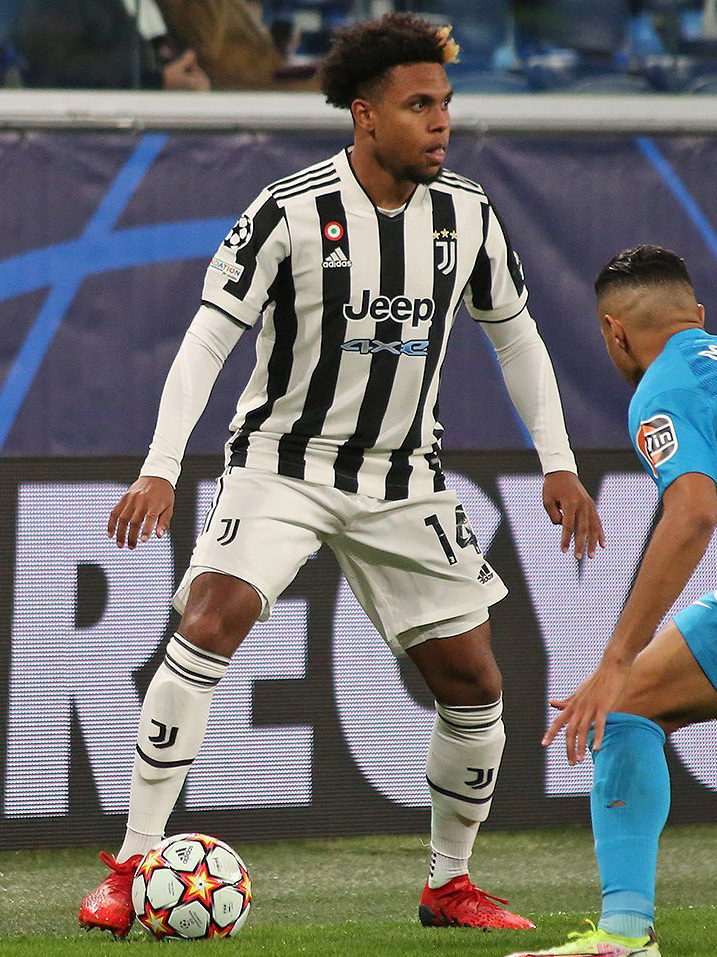
Weston McKennie playing for Juventus in 2021

- Michael Bradley – Chievo, Roma – 2011–14
- **Gianluca Busio** – **Venezia** – 2021–22, 2024–25, 2026–
- **Benjamin Cremaschi** – **Parma** – 2025–
- Sergiño Dest – Milan – 2022–23
- Armando Frigo – Fiorentina – 1939–42
- Alexi Lalas – Padova – 1994–96
- Patrick Leal – Venezia – 2021–22
- **Weston McKennie** – **Juventus** – 2020–
- **Yunus Musah** – **Milan**, Atalanta – 2023–
- **Christian Pulisic** – **Milan** – 2023–
- Bryan Reynolds – Roma – 2020–22
- Tanner Tessmann – Venezia – 2021–22
- Timothy Weah – Juventus – 2023–25

== Oceania (OFC) ==
=== New Zealand ===
- Liberato Cacace – Empoli – 2021–25

== South America (CONMEBOL) ==
=== Bolivia ===
- Jaume Cuéllar – SPAL – 2019–20

=== Chile ===
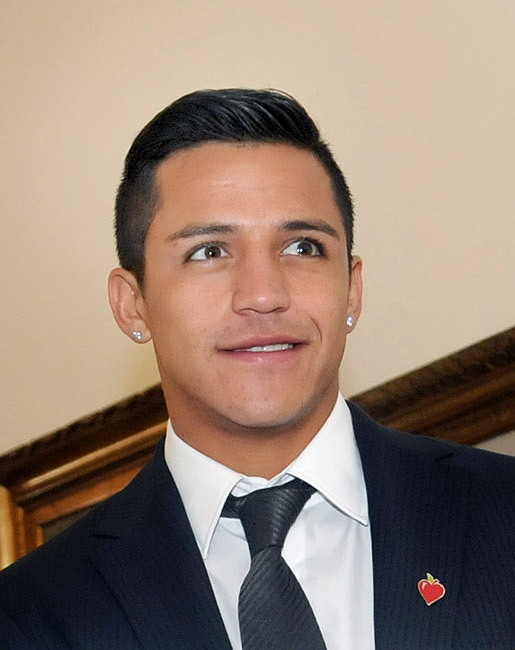
Alexis Sánchez

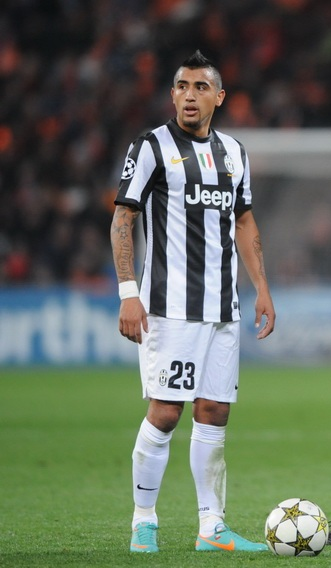
Arturo Vidal, an important player for Juventus between 2011 and 2015 for the rise of the club

- Matías Campos – Siena, Udinese – 2012–13
- Carlos Carmona – Reggina, Atalanta – 2008–09, 2011–17
- Nicolás Castillo – Frosinone – 2015–16
- Nicolás Córdova – Perugia, Livorno, Ascoli, Messina, Brescia – 2001–02, 2004–07, 2010–11
- Pascual de Gregorio – Bari – 1999–2001
- Alejandro Escalona – Torino – 1999–2000
- Matías Fernández – Fiorentina, Milan – 2012–17
- Pablo Galdames – Genoa, Cremonese – 2021–24
- Julio Gutiérrez – Udinese – 2000–01, 2003–04
- Mauricio Isla – Udinese, Juventus, Cagliari – 2007–14, 2015–17
- Manuel Iturra – Udinese – 2015–16
- Luis Jiménez – Fiorentina, Lazio, Inter, Parma, Cesena – 2005–11
- Cristóbal Jorquera – Genoa, Parma – 2011–13, 2014–15
- Carlos Labrín – Novara, Palermo – 2011–13
- Marcelo Larrondo – Siena, Fiorentina, Torino – 2009–10, 2011–15
- Felipe Loyola – Pisa – 2025–26
- Guillermo Maripán – Torino – 2024–26
- Gary Medel – Inter, Bologna – 2014–17, 2019–23
- Matías Pérez – Lecce – 2025–26
- Mauricio Pinilla – Chievo, Palermo, Cagliari, Genoa, Atalanta – 2003–04, 2010–17
- David Pizarro – Udinese, Inter, Roma, Fiorentina – 1999–2015
- Damián Pizarro – Udinese – 2024–25
- Erick Pulgar – Bologna, Fiorentina – 2015–22
- Luis Rojas – Crotone – 2020–21
- Hugo Rubio – Bologna – 1988–89
- Marcelo Salas – Lazio, Juventus – 1998–2003
- Mario Salgado – Brescia – 2001–02
- Alexis Sánchez – Udinese, Inter – 2008–11, 2019–22, 2023–25
- Felipe Seymour – Genoa, Catania, Chievo – 2011–13
- Francisco Sierralta – Parma – 2018–19
- Hector Tapia – Perugia – 1999–2000
- Jorge Toro – Sampdoria, Modena, Verona – 1962–64, 1969–70
- Jaime Valdés – Bari, Fiorentina, Lecce, Atalanta, Parma – 2000–01, 2004–06, 2008–10, 2011–14
- Diego Valencia – Salernitana – 2022–23
- Eduardo Vargas – Napoli – 2011–13
- Jorge Vargas – Reggina, Empoli, Livorno – 1999–2001, 2002–06
- Arturo Vidal – Juventus, Inter – 2011–15, 2020–22
- Iván Zamorano – Inter – 1996–2001

=== Colombia ===
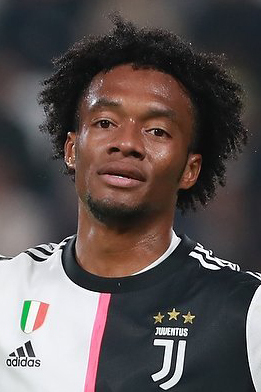
Juan Cuadrado

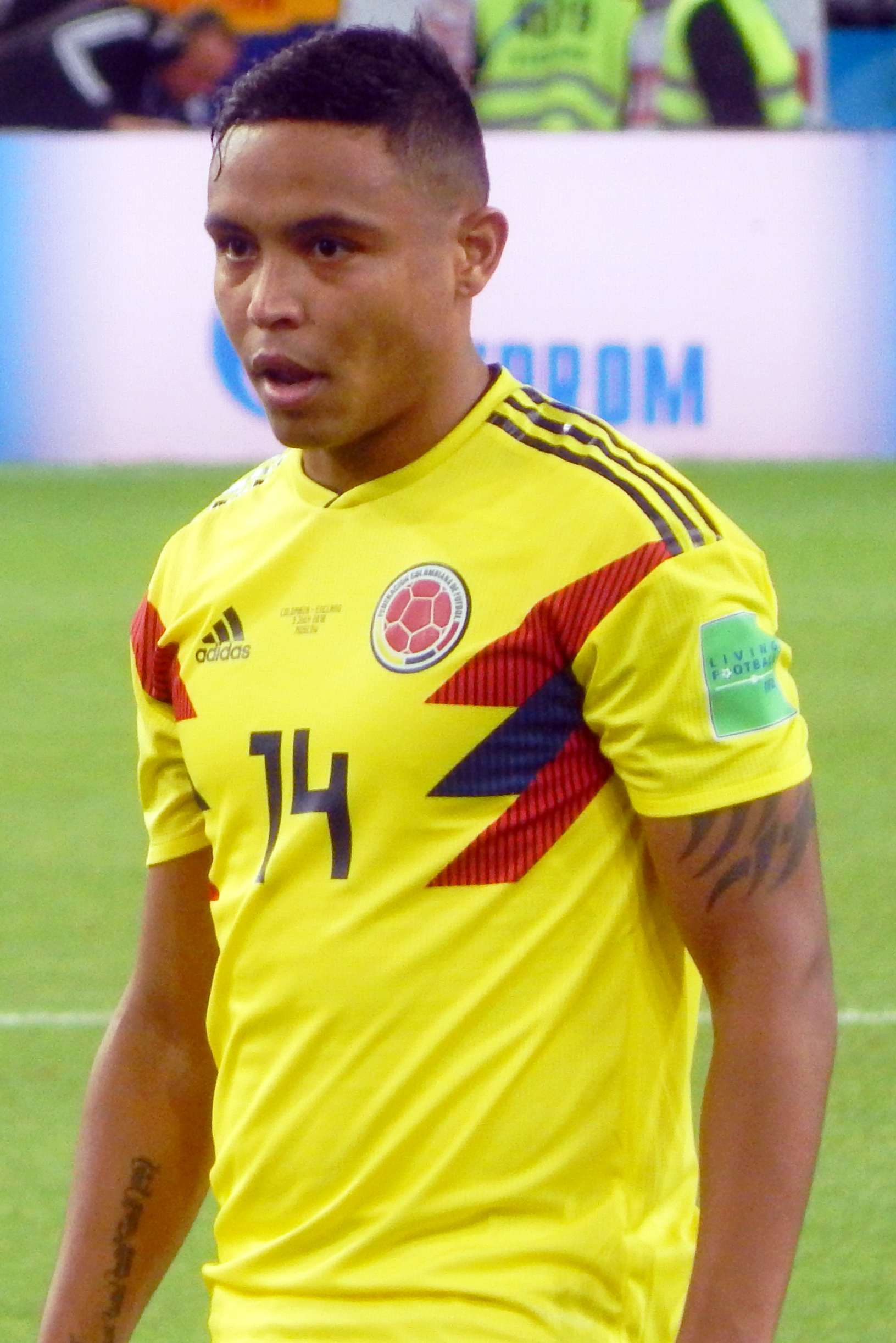
Luis Muriel

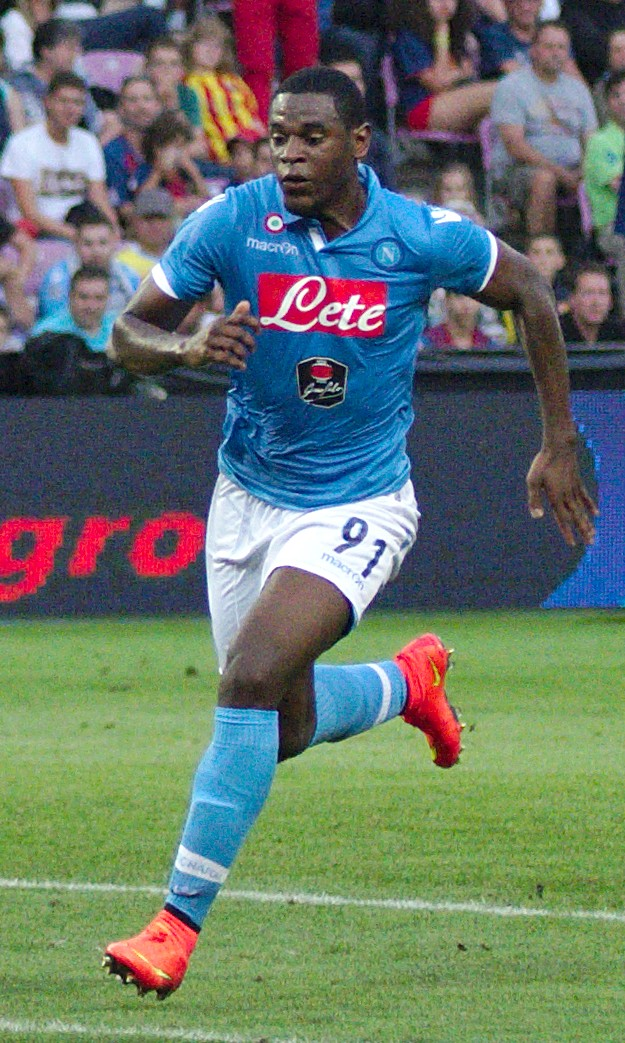
Duván Zapata

- Kevin Agudelo – Genoa, Fiorentina, Spezia – 2019–23
- Abel Aguilar – Udinese – 2005–06
- **Juan David Arizala** – **Udinese** – 2025–
- Pablo Armero – Udinese, Napoli, Milan – 2010–17
- Faustino Asprilla – Parma – 1992–96, 1997–99
- Carlos Bacca – Milan – 2015–17
- Jorge Bolaño – Parma, Sampdoria, Lecce – 1999–2007
- Miguel Borja – Livorno – 2013–14
- **Juan Cabal** – Verona, **Juventus** – 2022–
- Carlos Carbonero – Cesena, Sampdoria – 2014–16
- Damir Ceter – Cagliari – 2017–18, 2021–22
- Iván Córdoba – Inter – 2000–12
- Oscar Córdoba – Perugia – 2002–03
- Juan Cuadrado – Udinese, Lecce, Fiorentina, Juventus, Inter, Atalanta, Pisa – 2009–26
- Fredy Guarín – Inter – 2011–16
- Miguel Guerrero – Bari – 1994–96, 1997–99
- Víctor Ibarbo – Cagliari, Roma – 2011–17
- **Jhon Lucumí** – Bologna, **Juventus** – 2022–
- Gonzalo Martínez – Udinese, Reggina – 2001–04
- **Yerry Mina** – Fiorentina, **Cagliari** – 2023–
- Johan Mojica – Atalanta – 2020–21
- Johnnier Montaño – Parma, Verona, Piacenza – 1999–2004
- Daniel Mosquera – Verona – 2024–26
- Jonny Mosquera – Livorno – 2013–14
- Luis Muriel – Lecce, Udinese, Sampdoria, Fiorentina, Atalanta – 2011–17, 2018–24
- Jeison Murillo – Inter, Sampdoria – 2015–17, 2019–20, 2022–23
- David Ospina – Napoli – 2018–22
- Dorlan Pabón – Parma – 2012–13
- Brayan Perea – Lazio – 2013–15
- Juan Fernando Quintero – Pescara – 2012–13
- Freddy Rincón – Napoli – 1994–95
- Nelson Rivas – Inter, Livorno – 2007–10
- Carlos Sánchez – Fiorentina – 2016–18
- Jorge Horacio Serna – Como – 2002–03
- Andrés Tello – Empoli, Benevento – 2016–17, 2020–21
- Fernando Uribe – Chievo – 2010–12
- Adolfo Valencia – Reggiana – 1997–98
- Juan Manuel Valencia – Bologna – 2018–19
- Iván Valenciano – Atalanta – 1992–93
- **Devis Vásquez** – Empoli, **Roma** – 2024–25, 2026–
- Brayan Vera – Lecce – 2019–20
- Mario Yepes – Chievo, Milan, Atalanta – 2008–14
- Alexis Zapata – Udinese – 2014–15
- Cristián Zapata – Udinese, Milan, Genoa – 2005–11, 2012–21
- **Duván Zapata** – Napoli, Udinese, Sampdoria, Atalanta, **Torino** – 2013–
- Juan Camilo Zúñiga – Siena, Napoli, Bologna – 2008–16

=== Ecuador ===
- Bryan Cabezas – Atalanta – 2016–17
- Felipe Caicedo – Lazio, Genoa, Inter – 2017–22
- **Pervis Estupiñán** – **Milan** – 2025–
- Iván Kaviedes – Perugia – 1998–99
- Jeremy Sarmiento – Cremonese – 2025–26
- **John Yeboah** – **Venezia** – 2024–25, 2026–

=== Paraguay ===
- Dionisio Arce – Lazio, Napoli, Sampdoria, Novara, Torino, Palermo – 1949–60
- Óscar Ayala – Bari – 2000–01
- Édgar Barreto – Reggina, Atalanta, Palermo, Sampdoria – 2007–10, 2011–13, 2014–20
- Felix Benegas – Triestina – 1950–52
- Andrés Cubas – Pescara – 2016–17
- Marcelo Estigarribia – Juventus, Sampdoria, Chievo, Atalanta – 2011–16
- Carlos Gamarra – Inter – 2002–05
- Gustavo Gómez – Milan – 2016–17
- Tomás Guzmán – Siena – 2005–06
- Juan Iturbe – Verona, Roma, Torino – 2013–17
- Rubén Maldonado – Venezia, Napoli – 1999–2001, 2007–08
- Víctor Hugo Mareco – Brescia – 2002–05, 2010–11
- César Meza – Cesena – 2011–12
- José Montiel – Udinese, Reggina – 2006–08
- Gustavo Neffa – Cremonese – 1989–90, 1991–92
- Miguel Ortega – Genoa – 1946–48
- Carlos Humberto Paredes – Reggina – 2002–06
- José Parodi – Padova, Genoa – 1955–57
- Silvio Parodi Ramos – Fiorentina – 1956–57
- Iván Piris – Roma, Udinese – 2012–13, 2014–16
- Antonio Sanabria – Sassuolo, Roma, Genoa, Torino, Cremonese – 2013–15, 2018–26
- Federico Santander – Bologna – 2018–22
- Delio Toledo – Udinese – 1998–99
- Leongino Unzaim – Lazio – 1950–51

=== Peru ===
- Álvaro Ampuero – Parma – 2012–13
- Gerónimo Barbadillo – Avellino, Udinese – 1982–86
- Víctor Benítez – Milan, Messina, Roma, Venezia, Inter – 1962–70
- Rinaldo Cruzado – Chievo – 2011–13
- Alberto Gallardo – Milan, Cagliari – 1963–66
- Gianluca Lapadula – Milan, Genoa, Lecce, Benevento, Cagliari – 2016–21, 2023–25
- Hugo Natteri – Triestina, Alessandria – 1956–58
- Juan Seminario – Fiorentina – 1962–64
- Julio Uribe – Cagliari – 1982–83
- Juan Manuel Vargas – Catania, Fiorentina, Genoa – 2006–15

=== Venezuela ===
- Luis Balbo – Fiorentina – 2025–26
- Jhon Chancellor – Brescia – 2019–20
- Gabriel Cichero – Lecce – 2005–06
- Rolf Feltscher – Parma – 2010–12
- **Marco Libra** – **Bologna** – 2026–
- Darwin Machís – Udinese – 2018–19
- Massimo Margiotta – Udinese – 1999–2001, 2003–04
- Josef Martínez – Torino – 2014–17
- Edgar Moras – Genoa – 1982–83
- Yordan Osorio – Parma – 2020–21, 2024–25
- Adalberto Peñaranda – Udinese – 2016–17
- Andrés Ponce – Sampdoria – 2015–16
- Tomás Rincón – Genoa, Juventus, Torino, Sampdoria – 2014–23
- Aristóteles Romero – Crotone – 2017–18
- Rafael Romo – Udinese – 2009–10
- Telasco Segovia – Sampdoria – 2022–23
- Franco Signorelli – Empoli – 2014–16
- Ernesto Torregrossa – Brescia, Sampdoria – 2019–22

== See also ==
- Foreign Serie A Footballer of the Year
- List of Argentine footballers in Serie A
- List of Brazilian footballers in Serie A
- List of Uruguayan footballers in Serie A
- List of foreign Serie B players
- Oriundo

== Notes ==
1. Born in Albania
2. Born in Angola
3. Born in Angola (then Portuguese Angola)
4. Born in Argentina
5. Born in Australia
6. Born in Austria
7. Born in Austria (then Austria-Hungary)
8. Born in Belgium
9. Born in Bosnia and Herzegovina
10. Born in Bosnia and Herzegovina (then part of Austria-Hungary)
11. Born in Bosnia and Herzegovina (then part of the SFR Yugoslavia)
12. Born in Brazil
13. Born in Burkina Faso
14. Born in Burundi
15. Born in Cameroon
16. Born in Canada
17. Born in Cape Verde
18. Born in Cape Verde (then Portuguese Cape Verde)
19. Born in Colombia
20. Born in Croatia (then part of the SFR Yugoslavia)
21. Born in the Democratic Republic of Congo
22. Born in the Democratic Republic of Congo (then Zaïre)
23. Born in Denmark
24. Born in England
25. Born in France
26. Born in Georgia (then part of the Soviet Union)
27. Born in Germany
28. Born in Greece
29. Born in Guinea
30. Born in Guinea-Bissau
31. Born in Hungary
32. Born in Italy
33. Born in Ivory Coast
34. Born in Jamaica
35. Born in Kosovo (then part of the Kingdom of Serbia)
36. Born in Kosovo (then part of the SFR Yugoslavia)
37. Born in Kosovo (then part of the FR Yugoslavia)
38. Born in Luxembourg
39. Born in Moldova (then part of the Kingdom of Romania)
40. Born in Morocco
41. Born in Mozambique (then Portuguese Mozambique)
42. Born in the Netherlands
43. Born in Nigeria
44. Born in the North Macedonia (then part of the SFR Yugoslavia)
45. Born in Northern Ireland
46. Born in Poland
47. Born in Portugal
48. Born in Romania
49. Born in Romania (then Austria-Hungary)
50. Born in Russia
51. Born in Russia (then part of the Soviet Union)
52. Born in Serbia (then FR Yugoslavia)
53. Born in Serbia (then Serbia and Montenegro)
54. Born in Sierra Leone
55. Born in Slovenia
56. Born in South Africa
57. Born in Spain
58. Born in Suriname
59. Born in Suriname (then part of the Kingdom of the Netherlands)
60. Born in Sweden
61. Born in Switzerland
62. Born in Turkey
63. Born in Uganda
64. Born in Ukraine (then part of the Kingdom of Romania)
65. Born in Ukraine (then part of the Soviet Union)
66. Born in the United States
67. Born in Uruguay
68. Born in Uzbekistan (then part of the Soviet Union)
69. Born in West Germany (now part of Germany)
70. Capped for the Albania national football team
71. Capped for the Albania national under-21 football team
72. Capped for the Albania national under-19 football team
73. Capped for the Andalusia autonomous football team
74. Capped for the Aragon official football team
75. Capped for the Aruba national football team
76. Capped for the Argentina national under-20 football team
77. Capped for the Austria national under-21 football team
78. Capped for the Austria national under-19 football team
79. Capped for the Austria national under-18 football team
80. Capped for the Austria national under-17 football team
81. Capped for the Basque Country national football team
82. Capped for the Belgium national under-21 football team
83. Capped for the Belgium national under-19 football team
84. Capped for the Belgium national under-18 football team
85. Capped for the Belgium national under-17 football team
86. Capped for the Belgium national under-16 football team
87. Capped for the Belgium national under-15 football team
88. Capped for the Bosnia and Herzegovina national under-21 football team
89. Capped for the Bosnia and Herzegovina national under-19 football team
90. Capped for the Bosnia and Herzegovina national under-18 football team
91. Capped for the Bosnia and Herzegovina national under-17 football team
92. Capped for the Canada national under-20 football team
93. Capped for the Catalonia national football team
94. Capped for the Cantabria autonomous football team
95. Capped for the Canary Islands autonomous football team
96. Capped for the Croatia national football team
97. Capped for the Croatia national under-21 football team
98. Capped for the Croatia national under-20 football team
99. Capped for the Croatia national under-19 football team
100. Capped for the Czechoslovakia national football team
101. Capped for the England national under-21 football team
102. Capped for the England national under-20 football team
103. Capped for the England national under-19 football team
104. Capped for the England national under-18 football team
105. Capped for the England national under-17 football team
106. Capped for the England national under-16 football team
107. Capped for the England national under-15 football team
108. Capped for the France national football team
109. Capped for the France national under-21 football team
110. Capped for the France national under-20 football team
111. Capped for the France national under-19 football team
112. Capped for the France national under-18 football team
113. Capped for the France national under-17 football team
114. Capped for the France national under-16 football team
115. Capped for the Germany national under-21 football team
116. Capped for the Germany U20 team
117. Capped for the Germany U19 team
118. Capped for the Germany U18 team
119. Capped for the Germany U17 team
120. Capped for the Germany U16 team
121. Capped for the Germany U15 team
122. Capped for the Galicia national football team
123. Capped for the Guadeloupe national football team
124. Capped for the Italy national B team
125. Capped for the Italy national under-23 football team
126. Capped for the Italy national under-21 football team
127. Capped for the Italy national under-20 football team
128. Capped for the Italy national under-19 football team
129. Capped for the Italy national under-18 football team
130. Capped for the Italy national under-17 football team
131. Capped for the Italy national under-16 football team
132. Capped for the Italy national under-15 football team
133. Capped for the Jamaica national football team
134. Capped for the Jamaica national under-20 football team
135. Capped for the Kosovo national football team
136. Capped for the Kosovo national under-21 football team
137. Capped for the Kosovo national under-19 football team
138. Capped for the Luxembourg national under-19 football team
139. Capped for the Luxembourg national under-17 football team
140. Capped for the Montenegro national under-21 football team
141. Capped for the Netherlands national under-21 football team
142. Capped for the Netherlands national under-20 football team
143. Capped for the Netherlands national under-19 football team
144. Capped for the Netherlands national under-18 football team
145. Capped for the Netherlands national under-17 football team
146. Capped for the Netherlands national under-16 football team
147. Capped for the Netherlands national under-15 football team
148. Capped for the Northern Ireland national football team
149. Capped for the Norway national football team
150. Capped for the Norway national under-23 football team
151. Capped for the Norway national under-21 football team
152. Capped for the Norway national under-19 football team
153. Capped for the Norway national under-18 football team
154. Capped for the Norway national under-17 football team
155. Capped for the Norway national under-16 football team
156. Capped for the Norway national under-15 football team
157. Capped for the Padania national football team
158. Capped for the Portugal national under-23 football team
159. Capped for the Portugal national under-21 football team
160. Capped for the Portugal national under-20 football team
161. Capped for the Portugal national under-19 football team
162. Capped for the Portugal national under-18 football team
163. Capped for the Portugal national under-16 football team
164. Capped for the Portugal national under-15 football team
165. Capped for the Serbia national under-21 football team
166. Capped for the Serbia national under-19 football team
167. Capped for the Spain national under-21 football team
168. Capped for the Spain national under-19 football team
169. Capped for the Spain national under-17 football team
170. Capped for the Suriname national football team
171. Capped for the Sweden national under-21 football team
172. Capped for the Sweden men's national under-19 football team
173. Capped for the Sweden national under-18 football team
174. Capped for the Sweden men's national under-17 football team
175. Capped for the Sweden national under-16 football team
176. Capped for the Sweden national under-15 football team
177. Capped for the Switzerland national under-21 football team
178. Capped for the Switzerland national under-20 football team
179. Capped for the Switzerland national under-19 football team
180. Capped for the Switzerland national under-18 football team
181. Capped for the Switzerland national under-17 football team
182. Capped for the Switzerland national under-16 football team
183. Capped for the Switzerland national under-15 football team
184. Capped for the Turkey national under-21 football team
185. Capped for the Turkey national under-19 football team
186. Capped for the Turkey national under-16 football team
187. Capped for the Uruguay national under-17 football team
188. Capped for the United States men's national under-23 soccer team
189. Capped for the United States men's national under-20 soccer team
190. Capped for the United States men's national under-19 soccer team
191. Capped for the United States men's national under-17 soccer team
192. Capped for the United States men's national under-15 soccer team
193. Capped for the Valencian Community autonomous football team
194. Capped for the Yugoslavia national football team
