= 2020–21 Spezia Calcio season =

Spezia
2020–21 season
- Owner: Gabriele Volpi
- Chairman: Stefano Chisoli
- Manager: Vincenzo Italiano
- Stadium: Stadio Alberto Picco; Stadio Dino Manuzzi
- Serie A: 15th
- Coppa Italia: Quarter-finals
- Top goalscorer: League: M'Bala Nzola (11); All: M'Bala Nzola (11)
Home colours	Away colours	Third colours

The 2020–21 Spezia Calcio season was the club's 115th season in existence and the club's first season in the top flight of Italian football. In addition to the domestic league, Spezia participated in this season's edition of the Coppa Italia. The season covered the period from 3 August 2020 to 30 June 2021.

== Players ==
=== First-team squad ===
As of 29 January 2021

Note: Flags indicate national team as defined under FIFA eligibility rules; some limited exceptions apply. Players may hold more than one non-FIFA nationality.

No.	Pos.	Nation	Player
1	GK	NED	Jeroen Zoet
3	DF	URU	Juan Ramos
4	MF	ITA	Gennaro Acampora
5	DF	ITA	Riccardo Marchizza (on loan from Sassuolo)
7	DF	ITA	Jacopo Sala
8	MF	ITA	Matteo Ricci
9	FW	BUL	Andrey Galabinov
10	MF	FRA	Lucien Agoumé (on loan from Inter Milan)
11	FW	GHA	Emmanuel Gyasi
12	GK	LTU	Titas Krapikas
13	DF	ITA	Elio Capradossi
14	DF	ITA	Federico Mattiello (on loan from Atalanta)
17	FW	BRA	Diego Farias (on loan from Cagliari)
18	FW	FRA	M'Bala Nzola
19	DF	ITA	Claudio Terzi (captain)
20	DF	ITA	Simone Bastoni

No.	Pos.	Nation	Player
21	DF	ESP	Salva Ferrer
22	DF	GER	Jeff Chabot (on loan from Sampdoria)
23	MF	ITA	Riccardo Saponara (on loan from Fiorentina)
24	MF	ARG	Nahuel Estévez (on loan from Estudiantes)
25	MF	ITA	Giulio Maggiore (vice-captain)
26	MF	ITA	Tommaso Pobega (on loan from Milan)
28	DF	CRO	Martin Erlić
31	FW	ITA	Daniele Verde (on loan from AEK Athens)
34	DF	ALB	Ardian Ismajli
39	DF	ITA	Cristian Dell'Orco (on loan from Sassuolo)
69	DF	ITA	Luca Vignali
77	GK	BRA	Rafael
80	MF	COL	Kevin Agudelo (on loan from Genoa)
88	MF	BRA	Léo Sena (on loan from Atlético Mineiro)
91	FW	ITA	Roberto Piccoli (on loan from Atalanta)
94	GK	ITA	Ivan Provedel

=== Out on loan ===
Note: Flags indicate national team as defined under FIFA eligibility rules; some limited exceptions apply. Players may hold more than one non-FIFA nationality.

No.	Pos.	Nation	Player
—	GK	ITA	Marco Angeletti (at Pontedera until 30 June 2021)
—	GK	CAN	Axel Desjardins (at Novara until 30 June 2021)
—	DF	ITA	Cristian Cerretti (at Imolese until 30 June 2021)
—	DF	ITA	Lorenzo Colombini (at Novara until 30 June 2021)
—	MF	NGR	Theophilus Awua (at Pro Vercelli until 30 June 2021)

No.	Pos.	Nation	Player
—	MF	ITA	Matteo Figoli (at Pergolettese until 30 June 2021)
—	MF	ITA	Alessandro Bordin (at Casertana until 30 June 2021)
—	MF	NGR	Adamo Haruna (at Grosseto until 30 June 2021)
—	FW	ISL	Sveinn Aron Guðjohnsen (at Odense until 30 June 2021)
—	FW	ITA	Gregorio Morachioli (at Imolese until 30 June 2021)

== Pre-season and friendlies ==
Win Draw Loss

19 September 2020 Friendly	Spezia (Italy)	5–0	(Italy) Pistoiese	La Spezia, Italy
19:30 CEST (UTC+2)				Stadium: Stadio Alberto Picco; Attendance: 0

== Competitions ==
=== Overview ===
Competition	First match	Last match	Starting round	Final position	Record							
Competition	First match	Last match	Starting round	Final position	Pld	W	D	L	GF	GA	GD	Win %
Serie A	27 September 2020	23 May 2021	Matchday 1	15th	38	9	12	17	52	72	−20	23.68
Coppa Italia	28 October 2020	28 January 2021	Third round	Quarter-finals	4	3	0	1	11	6	+5	75.00
Total					42	12	12	18	63	78	−15	28.57

Last updated: 23 May 2021
Source: Soccerway

Note: Coppa Italia match against Roma originally ended in a 4–2 win.

=== Serie A ===
==== League table ====
Pos	Team	Pld	W	D	L	GF	GA	GD	Pts
13	Fiorentina	38	9	13	16	47	59	−12	40
14	Udinese	38	10	10	18	42	58	−16	40
15	Spezia	38	9	12	17	52	72	−20	39
16	Cagliari	38	9	10	19	43	59	−16	37
17	Torino	38	7	16	15	50	69	−19	37

Source: Serie A, Soccerway
Rules for classification: 1) Points; 2) Head-to-head points; 3) Head-to-head goal difference; 4) Goal difference; 5) Goals scored; 6) Draw. (Note: Head-to-head record is used only after all the matches between the teams in question have been played)

==== Results summary ====
Overall								Home						Away					
Pld	W	D	L	GF	GA	GD	Pts	W	D	L	GF	GA	GD	W	D	L	GF	GA	GD
38	9	12	17	52	72	−20	39	5	7	7	28	33	−5	4	5	10	24	39	−15

Last updated: 23 May 2021.
Source: Serie A

==== Results by round ====
Round	1	2	3	4	5	6	7	8	9	10	11	12	13	14	15	16	17	18	19	20	21	22	23	24	25	26	27	28	29	30	31	32	33	34	35	36	37	38
Ground	A	H	A	H	A	H	A	H	A	H	A	H	A	H	H	A	H	A	A	H	A	H	A	H	A	H	A	H	A	H	A	H	A	A	H	A	H	H
Result	W	L	L	D	D	L	W	D	D	L	L	D	L	L	L	W	W	D	L	L	W	W	L	D	L	D	L	W	L	W	L	D	L	D	L	D	W	D
Position	13	11	15	14	14	17	13	13	14	15	16	16	17	17	18	16	14	13	15	16	16	13	16	14	15	15	15	15	16	14	14	15	15	16	17	17	15	15

Updated to match(es) played on 23 May 2021. Source: Serie A
A = Away; H = Home; W = Win; D = Draw; L = Loss

==== Matches ====
The League fixtures were announced on 2 September 2020.

27 September 2020 2	Spezia	1–4	Sassuolo	La Spezia
12:30 CEST (UTC+2)	Galabinov 30'; Sala (yellow card) 44'; Zoet (yellow card) 63'	Report	Đuričić 12', (yellow card) 45+4'; Berardi 64' (pen.); Defrel 66'; Caputo 76'	Stadium: Stadio Alberto Picco; Referee: Davide Ghersini

30 September 2020 1	Udinese	0–2	Spezia	Udine
18:00 CEST (UTC+2)		Report	Galabinov 29', 90+4'; Terzi (yellow card) 39' (yellow-red card) 66'; Ferrer (yellow card) 79'; Ramos (yellow card) 86'; Farias (yellow card) 90+4'	Stadium: Stadio Friuli; Referee: Alessandro Prontera
Note: The match was originally scheduled for 20 September 2020, but was postponed due to Spezia's involvement in the Serie B promotion play-offs.

4 October 2020 3	Milan	3–0	Spezia	Milan
18:00 CEST (UTC+2)	Çalhanoğlu (yellow card) 47'; Leão 57', 78'; Hernandez 76'	Report	Ricci (yellow card) 32'; Gyasi (yellow card) 40'	Stadium: San Siro; Referee: Marco Serra

18 October 2020 4	Spezia	2–2	Fiorentina	Cesena
15:00 CEST (UTC+2)	Verde 39'; Deiola (yellow card) 45+1'; Chabot (yellow card) 59'; Farias 75'	Report	Pezzella 2'; Biraghi 4'; Bonaventura (yellow card) 66'; Lirola (yellow card) 86'	Stadium: Stadio Dino Manuzzi; Referee: Gianluca Manganiello

25 October 2020 5	Parma	2–2	Spezia	Parma
15:00 CET (UTC+1)	Grassi (yellow card) 5'; Hernani (yellow card) 23'; Gagliolo 34'; Sohm (yellow card) 90'; Kucka 90+2' (pen.)	Report	Pobega (yellow card) 6'; Chabot 28'; Agudelo 31'; Ferrer (yellow card) 85'	Stadium: Stadio Ennio Tardini; Referee: Valerio Marini

1 November 2020 6	Spezia	1–4	Juventus	Cesena
15:00 CET (UTC+1)	Pobega 32'; Chabot (yellow card) 49'; Bartolomei (yellow card) 75'; Estévez (yellow card) 87'	Report	Morata 14'; Ronaldo 59', 76' (pen.); Rabiot 67', (yellow card) 69'	Stadium: Stadio Dino Manuzzi; Attendance: 0 Referee: Rosario Abisso

7 November 2020 7	Benevento	0–3	Spezia	Benevento
18:00 CET (UTC+1)	Improta (yellow card) 47'; Maggio (yellow card) 83'; Caldirola (yellow card) 90'	Report	Pobega 29'; Bastoni (yellow card) 54'; Agudelo (yellow card) 57'; Nzola 65', 70'; Estévez (yellow card) 82'	Stadium: Stadio Ciro Vigorito; Attendance: 0 Referee: Gianluca Aureliano

21 November 2020 8	Spezia	0–0	Atalanta	Cesena
18:00 CET (UTC+1)	Ricci (yellow card) 3'; Estévez (yellow card) 28'; Terzi (yellow card) 65'	Report	Gosens (yellow card) 38'; Pašalić (yellow card) 52'; Pessina (yellow card) 85'	Stadium: Stadio Dino Manuzzi; Attendance: 0 Referee: Antonio Rapuano

29 November 2020 9	Cagliari	2–2	Spezia	Cagliari
18:00 CET (UTC+1)	João Pedro 52'; Pavoletti 58'	Report	Ferrer (yellow card) 30'; Terzi (yellow card) 33'; Gyasi 36'; Estévez (yellow card) 44'; Chabot (yellow card) 81'; Nzola 90+3' (pen.)	Stadium: Sardegna Arena; Attendance: 0 Referee: Valerio Marini

5 December 2020 10	Spezia	1–2	Lazio	Cesena
15:00 CET (UTC+1)	Bastoni (yellow card) 23'; Terzi (yellow card) 32'; Nzola 64'; Ricci (yellow card) 82'	Report	Immobile 15'; Milinković-Savić 33'; Akpa Akpro (yellow card) 84'	Stadium: Stadio Dino Manuzzi; Attendance: 0 Referee: Daniele Chiffi

12 December 2020 11	Crotone	4–1	Spezia	Crotone
15:00 CET (UTC+1)	Messias 7', 90+6', (yellow card) 33'; Eduardo (yellow card) 34', (goal) 56'; Reca 49'; Magallán (yellow card) 70'	Report	Chabot (yellow card) 3'; Farias 18'; Ferrer (yellow card) 22'; Maggiore (yellow card) 64'	Stadium: Stadio Ezio Scida; Attendance: 0 Referee: Antonio Giua

16 December 2020 12	Spezia	2–2	Bologna	La Spezia
20:45 CET (UTC+1)	Marchizza (yellow card) 16'; Nzola 19', 63'; Gyasi (yellow card) 37'; Agoumé (yellow card) 49'; Chabot (yellow card) 85'; Provedel (yellow card) 90+1'; Erlić (yellow card) 90+3'	Report	Tomiyasu (yellow card) 25'; Domínguez 72'; Barrow 90+2', (penalty missed) 90+6'	Stadium: Stadio Alberto Picco; Attendance: 0 Referee: Piero Giacomelli

20 December 2020 13	Internazionale	2–1	Spezia	Milan
15:00 CET (UTC+1)	Brozović (yellow card) 18'; Hakimi 52'; Lukaku 71' (pen.)	Report	Nzola (yellow card) 41'; Terzi (yellow card) 42'; Piccoli 90+4'	Stadium: San Siro; Attendance: 0 Referee: Michael Fabbri

23 December 2020 14	Spezia	1–2	Genoa	La Spezia
20:45 CET (UTC+1)	Erlić (yellow card) 2'; Chabot (yellow card) 5'; Nzola 10'; Terzi (yellow card) 72'	Report	Destro 16', (yellow card) 70'; Pandev (yellow card) 33'; Ghiglione (yellow card) 43'; Criscito 73' (pen.); Zajc (yellow card) 75'	Stadium: Stadio Alberto Picco; Attendance: 0 Referee: Davide Massa

3 January 2021 15	Spezia	0–1	Hellas Verona	La Spezia
15:00 CET (UTC+1)	Chabot (yellow card) 12' (yellow-red card) 69'; Estévez (yellow card) 35'; Pobega (yellow card) 66'; Erlić (yellow card) 77'; Agoumé (yellow card) 79'	Report	Zaccagni 75'	Stadium: Stadio Alberto Picco; Attendance: 0 Referee: Luca Pairetto

6 January 2021 16	Napoli	1–2	Spezia	Naples
18:00 CET (UTC+1)	Petagna 58'; Di Lorenzo (yellow card) 87'; Manolas (yellow card) 90+3'	Report	Ismajli (yellow card) 61' (yellow-red card) 77'; Pobega (yellow card) 65', (goal) 82'; Nzola 68' (pen.); Maggiore (yellow card) 72'; Terzi (yellow card) 88'	Stadium: Stadio San Paolo; Attendance: 0 Referee: Maurizio Mariani

11 January 2021 17	Spezia	2–1	Sampdoria	La Spezia
20:45 CET (UTC+1)	Terzi 20'; Farias (yellow card) 37'; Nzola 60' (pen.); Gyasi (yellow card) 90+2'; Marchizza (yellow card) 90+4'; Agudelo (yellow card) 90+5'	Report	Candreva 24'; Yoshida (yellow card) 34'; Bereszyński (yellow card) 56'; Jankto (yellow card) 71'	Stadium: Stadio Alberto Picco; Attendance: 0 Referee: Marco Piccinini

16 January 2021 18	Torino	0–0	Spezia	Turin
18:00 CET (UTC+1)	Buongiorno (yellow card) 34'; Lyanco (yellow card) 61'; Linetty (yellow card) 89'	Report	Vignali (red card) 8'; Pobega (yellow card) 17'; Verde (yellow card) 59'; Marchizza (yellow card) 76'; Gyasi (yellow card) 84'	Stadium: Stadio Olimpico Grande Torino; Attendance: 0 Referee: Michael Fabbri

23 January 2021 19	Roma	4–3	Spezia	Rome
15:00 CET (UTC+1)	Mayoral 17', 52', (yellow card) 87'; Karsdorp 55'; Peres (yellow card) 87'; Pellegrini 90+2', (yellow card) 90+3'	Report	Chabot (yellow card) 21'; Piccoli 24'; Farias 59'; Verde 90'	Stadium: Stadio Olimpico; Attendance: 0 Referee: Luca Pairetto

31 January 2021 20	Spezia	0–1	Udinese	La Spezia
12:30 CET (UTC+1)	Pobega (yellow card) 23'; Vignali (yellow card) 39'; Bastoni (yellow card) 66'; Acampora (yellow card) 68'; Saponara (yellow card) 81' (yellow-red card) 86'	Report	Bonifazi (yellow card) 16'; De Paul 52' (pen.), (yellow card) 71' (yellow-red card) 75'; De Maio (yellow card) 89'	Stadium: Stadio Alberto Picco; Attendance: 0 Referee: Antonio Di Martino

6 February 2021 21	Sassuolo	1–2	Spezia	Reggio Emilia
15:00 CET (UTC+1)	Caputo 25'; Locatelli (yellow card) 79'; Ferrari (yellow card) 86'	Report	Bastoni (yellow card) 31'; Erlić 39', (yellow card) 69'; Gyasi 78'; Vignali (yellow card) 90+1'	Stadium: Mapei Stadium; Attendance: 0 Referee: Juan Luca Sacchi

13 February 2021 22	Spezia	2–0	Milan	La Spezia
20:45 CET (UTC+1)	Vignali (yellow card) 23'; Bastoni (yellow card) 25', (goal) 67'; Maggiore 56'; Erlić (yellow card) 58'	Report	Dalot (yellow card) 65'	Stadium: Stadio Alberto Picco; Attendance: 0 Referee: Daniele Chiffi

19 February 2021 23	Fiorentina	3–0	Spezia	Florence
18:30 CET (UTC+1)	Amrabat (yellow card) 18'; Vlahović 48'; Castrovilli 64'; Eysseric (yellow card) 75', (goal) 82'; Valero (yellow card) 77'; Martínez Quarta (yellow card) 90+2'	Report		Stadium: Stadio Artemio Franchi; Attendance: 0 Referee: Gianpaolo Calvarese

27 February 2021 24	Spezia	2–2	Parma	La Spezia
15:00 CET (UTC+1)	Ricci (yellow card) 21'; Gyasi 52', 72'; Nzola (yellow card) 87'; Acampora (yellow card) 90'	Report	Brunetta (yellow card) 9'; Karamoh 17'; Hernani 25', (yellow card) 50'; Kurtić (yellow card) 84'; Gagliolo (yellow card) 85'	Stadium: Stadio Alberto Picco; Attendance: 0 Referee: Daniele Orsato

2 March 2021 25	Juventus	3–0	Spezia	Turin
20:45 CET (UTC+1)	Frabotta (yellow card) 10'; Morata 62'; Chiesa 71'; Ronaldo 89'; Demiral (yellow card) 90+6'	Report	Galabinov (penalty missed) 90+6'	Stadium: Allianz Stadium; Attendance: 0 Referee: Juan Luca Sacchi

6 March 2021 26	Spezia	1–1	Benevento	La Spezia
15:00 CET (UTC+1)	Bastoni (yellow card) 25'; Verde 71'; Erlić (yellow card) 80'	Report	Gaich 24'; Improta (yellow card) 44'; Barba (yellow card) 72'; Sau (yellow card) 79'; Dabo (yellow card) 90+2'	Stadium: Stadio Alberto Picco; Attendance: 0 Referee: Francesco Fourneau

12 March 2021 27	Atalanta	3–1	Spezia	Bergamo
20:45 CET (UTC+1)	Toloi (yellow card) 8'; De Roon (yellow card) 25'; Pašalić 53', 73'; Muriel 55'	Report	Piccoli 82'	Stadium: Gewiss Stadium; Attendance: 0 Referee: Valerio Marini

20 March 2021 28	Spezia	2–1	Cagliari	La Spezia
18:00 CET (UTC+1)	Piccoli 49'; Farias (yellow card) 72'; Maggiore 80'	Report	Nainggolan (yellow card) 43'; João Pedro (yellow card) 45+2'; Pereiro 83'	Stadium: Stadio Alberto Picco; Attendance: 0 Referee: Maurizio Mariani

3 April 2021 29	Lazio	2–1	Spezia	Rome
15:00 CEST (UTC+2)	Pereira (yellow card) 30'; Lazzari 56', (red card) 90+6'; Correa (yellow card) 77' (yellow-red card) 90+8'; Caicedo 88' (pen.)	Report	Chabot (yellow card) 20'; Verde 73'; Nzola (yellow card) 90+4'; Agudelo (yellow card) 90+6'	Stadium: Stadio Olimpico; Attendance: 0 Referee: Antonio Giua

10 April 2021 30	Spezia	3–2	Crotone	La Spezia
15:00 CEST (UTC+2)	Ismajli (yellow card) 33'; Verde 63'; Maggiore 89'; Erlić 90+2'	Report	Reca (yellow card) 26'; Djidji 40'; Simy 78'	Stadium: Stadio Alberto Picco; Attendance: 0 Referee: Simone Sozza

18 April 2021 31	Bologna	4–1	Spezia	Bologna
15:00 CEST (UTC+2)	Orsolini 12' (pen.); Barrow 18'; Soumaoro (yellow card) 39'; Svanberg 54', 60'	Report	Ismajli 34'; Bastoni (yellow card) 36'	Stadium: Stadio Renato Dall'Ara; Attendance: 0 Referee: Marco Piccinini

21 April 2021 32	Spezia	1–1	Internazionale	La Spezia
20:45 CEST (UTC+2)	Farias 12'; Marchizza (yellow card) 62'; Estévez (yellow card) 89'	Report	Perišić 39'	Stadium: Stadio Alberto Picco; Attendance: 0 Referee: Daniele Chiffi

24 April 2021 33	Genoa	2–0	Spezia	Genoa
15:00 CEST (UTC+2)	Criscito (yellow card) 18'; Pandev (yellow card) 32'; Scamacca 63'; Shomurodov 86'	Report	Terzi (yellow card) 2'; Nzola (yellow card) 37'	Stadium: Stadio Luigi Ferraris; Attendance: 0 Referee: Gianluca Manganiello

1 May 2021 34	Hellas Verona	1–1	Spezia	Verona
15:00 CEST (UTC+2)	Zaccagni (yellow card) 15'; Dawidowicz (yellow card) 38'; Sturaro (yellow card) 40'; Salcedo 46'; Ilić (yellow card) 69'; Tameze (yellow card) 71'; Faraoni (yellow card) 84'	Report	Nzola (yellow card) 13'; Chabot (yellow card) 50'; Saponara 86'	Stadium: Stadio Marcantonio Bentegodi; Attendance: 0 Referee: Manuel Volpi

8 May 2021 35	Spezia	1–4	Napoli	La Spezia
15:00 CEST (UTC+2)	Ricci (yellow card) 34'; Estévez (yellow card) 58'; Vignali (yellow card) 62'; Piccoli 64'	Report	Hysaj (yellow card) 6'; Zieliński 15'; Osimhen 23', 44', (yellow card) 65'; Lozano 79'	Stadium: Stadio Alberto Picco; Attendance: 0 Referee: Massimiliano Irrati

12 May 2021 36	Sampdoria	2–2	Spezia	Genoa
20:45 CEST (UTC+2)	Verre 32', (yellow card) 66'; Keita 80'; Ekdal (yellow card) 89'	Report	Pobega 15', 73'; Maggiore (yellow card) 34'; Farias (yellow card) 88'	Stadium: Stadio Luigi Ferraris; Attendance: 0 Referee: Fabio Maresca

15 May 2021 37	Spezia	4–1	Torino	La Spezia
15:00 CEST (UTC+2)	Saponara 19'; Agudelo (yellow card) 28'; Pobega (yellow card) 33'; Nzola 41' (pen.), 74'; Farias (yellow card) 80'; Erlić 84'	Report	Vojvoda (yellow card) 32'; Belotti 54' (pen.); Rincón (yellow card) 57'; Buongiorno (yellow card) 78'; Bremer (yellow card) 83'; Verdi (yellow card) 90+1'	Stadium: Stadio Alberto Picco; Attendance: 0 Referee: Daniele Orsato

23 May 2021 38	Spezia	2–2	Roma	La Spezia
20:45 CEST (UTC+2)	Verde 6'; Pobega 38'	Report	El Shaarawy 52'; Mkhitaryan 85'; Kumbulla (yellow card) 90+4'	Stadium: Stadio Alberto Picco; Attendance: 0 Referee: Ivano Pezzuto

=== Coppa Italia ===
28 October 2020 Third round	Cittadella	0–2	Spezia	Cesena
16:00 CET (UTC+1)	Adorni (yellow card) 74'	Report	Verde 49'; Benedetti 63' (o.g.); Vignali (yellow card) 69'; Ismajli (yellow card) 87'	Stadium: Stadio Dino Manuzzi; Referee: Marco Serra

25 November 2020 Fourth round	Bologna	2–4 (a.e.t.)	Spezia	Bologna
17:30 CET (UTC+1)	Barrow 13'; Domínguez (yellow card) 44'; Orsolini 45+1'; Medel (yellow card) 50'; Soriano (yellow card) 104'; Sansone (yellow card) 116'	Report	Piccoli 5'; Marchizza (yellow card) 27'; Agudelo (yellow card) 58'; Chabot (yellow card) 62'; Farias 64'; Deiola (yellow card) 78'; Krapikas (yellow card) 89'; Maggiore 100', 119', (yellow card) 114'; Mattiello (yellow card) 114'	Stadium: Stadio Renato Dall'Ara; Referee: Manuel Volpi

19 January 2021 Round of 16	Roma	0–3	Spezia	Rome
21:15 CET (UTC+1)	Pellegrini 43' (pen.), (yellow card) 111'; Mancini (yellow card) 51' (yellow-red card) 92'; Mkhitaryan 73'; López (red card) 92'	Report	Galabinov 6' (pen.); Agudelo (yellow card) 13'; Saponara 15', 119'; Ismajli (yellow card) 24'; Dell'Orco (yellow card) 90+1'; Verde 107'	Stadium: Stadio Olimpico; Referee: Davide Ghersini
Note: Match awarded 3–0 to Spezia, due to Roma making six substitutions instead of the maximum five allowed. Spezia had originally won 4–2 after extra time.

28 January 2021 Quarter-finals	Napoli	4–2	Spezia	Naples
21:00 CET (UTC+1)	Koulibaly 5'; Lozano (yellow card) 10', (goal) 20'; Politano 30'; Elmas 40'; Mário Rui (yellow card) 61'	Report	Gyasi 71'; Acampora 73'	Stadium: Stadio San Paolo; Referee: Francesco Fourneau

== Statistics ==
=== Appearances and goals ===
No.	Pos	Nat	Player	Total		Serie A		Coppa Italia	
No.	Pos	Nat	Player	Apps	Goals	Apps	Goals	Apps	Goals
Goalkeepers
1	GK	(Netherlands) NED	Jeroen Zoet	7	0	7	0	0	0
12	GK	(Lithuania) LTU	Titas Krapikas	4	0	0	0	4	0
77	GK	(Brazil) BRA	Rafael	3	0	2+1	0	0	0
94	GK	(Italy) ITA	Ivan Provedel	29	0	29	0	0	0
Defenders
3	DF	(Uruguay) URU	Juan Ramos	8	0	2+4	0	1+1	0
5	DF	(Italy) ITA	Riccardo Marchizza	25	0	17+7	0	1	0
7	DF	(Italy) ITA	Jacopo Sala	7	0	4+2	0	1	0
13	DF	(Italy) ITA	Elio Capradossi	1	0	1	0	0	0
14	DF	(Italy) ITA	Federico Mattiello	2	0	0+1	0	0+1	0
19	DF	(Italy) ITA	Claudio Terzi	27	1	22+3	1	1+1	0
20	DF	(Italy) ITA	Simone Bastoni	23	1	19+3	1	0+1	0
21	DF	(Spain) ESP	Salva Ferrer	19	0	14+4	0	1	0
22	DF	(Germany) GER	Jeff Chabot	27	1	19+6	1	2	0
28	DF	(Croatia) CRO	Martin Erlić	28	3	19+8	3	1	0
34	DF	(Albania) ALB	Ardian Ismajli	21	1	14+3	1	3+1	0
39	DF	(Italy) ITA	Cristian Dell'Orco	11	0	2+6	0	2+1	0
69	DF	(Italy) ITA	Luca Vignali	25	0	19+2	0	3+1	0
Midfielders
4	MF	(Italy) ITA	Gennaro Acampora	17	1	2+12	0	2+1	1
8	MF	(Italy) ITA	Matteo Ricci	32	0	26+3	0	2+1	0
10	MF	(France) FRA	Lucien Agoumé	13	0	9+3	0	1	0
23	MF	(Italy) ITA	Riccardo Saponara	10	4	5+4	2	1	2
24	MF	(Argentina) ARG	Nahuel Estévez	29	0	19+8	0	1+1	0
25	MF	(Italy) ITA	Giulio Maggiore	35	5	26+7	3	1+1	2
26	MF	(Italy) ITA	Tommaso Pobega	20	6	17+3	6	0	0
80	MF	(Colombia) COL	Kevin Agudelo	33	1	14+15	1	2+2	0
88	MF	(Brazil) BRA	Léo Sena	19	0	8+8	0	1+2	0
Forwards
9	FW	(Bulgaria) BUL	Andrey Galabinov	14	4	4+8	3	2	1
11	FW	(Ghana) GHA	Emmanuel Gyasi	39	5	32+5	4	1+1	1
17	FW	(Brazil) BRA	Diego Farias	32	5	17+12	4	1+2	1
18	FW	(Angola) ANG	M'Bala Nzola	25	11	21+4	11	0	0
31	FW	(Italy) ITA	Daniele Verde	24	8	12+9	6	2+1	2
91	FW	(Italy) ITA	Roberto Piccoli	23	6	8+12	5	2+1	1
Players transferred out during the season
6	MF	(Italy) ITA	Luca Mora	6	0	1+3	0	2	0
16	MF	(Italy) ITA	Paolo Bartolomei	6	0	3+3	0	0	0
27	MF	(Italy) ITA	Alessandro Deiola	15	0	4+8	0	3	0

Last updated: 23 May 2021
Source: Competitions

=== Goalscorers ===
As of 19 February 2021

Rank	No.	Pos	Nat	Name	Serie A	Coppa Italia	Total
1	18	FW	(France)	M'Bala Nzola	9	0	9
2	9	FW	(Bulgaria)	Andrey Galabinov	3	1	4
2	17	FW	(Brazil)	Diego Farias	3	1	4
2	31	FW	(Italy)	Daniele Verde	2	2	4
5	11	FW	(Ghana)	Emmanuel Gyasi	2	1	3
5	25	MF	(Italy)	Giulio Maggiore	1	2	3
5	26	MF	(Italy)	Tommaso Pobega	3	0	3
5	91	FW	(Italy)	Roberto Piccoli	2	1	3
9	23	MF	(Italy)	Riccardo Saponara	0	2	2
10	4	MF	(Italy)	Gennaro Acampora	0	1	1
10	19	DF	(Italy)	Claudio Terzi	1	0	1
10	20	DF	(Italy)	Simone Bastoni	1	0	1
10	22	DF	(Germany)	Jeff Chabot	1	0	1
10	28	DF	(Croatia)	Martin Erlić	1	0	1
10	80	MF	(Colombia)	Kevin Agudelo	1	0	1
Own goal					0	1	1
Totals					30	12	42
