= 2019–20 Spezia Calcio season =

Spezia
2019–20 season
- Owner: Gabriele Volpi
- Chairman: Stefano Chisoli
- Manager: Vincenzo Italiano
- Stadium: Stadio Alberto Picco
- Serie B: 3rd (promoted)
- Coppa Italia: Third round
Home colours	Away colours

The 2019–20 season was the 114th season in the existence of Spezia Calcio and the club's eighth consecutive in the second division of Italian football. In addition to the domestic league, Spezia participated in this season's edition of the Coppa Italia.

== Players ==
=== First-team squad ===
As of 31 January 2020.

Note: Flags indicate national team as defined under FIFA eligibility rules; some limited exceptions apply. Players may hold more than one non-FIFA nationality.

No.	Pos.	Nation	Player
1	GK	ITA	Simone Scuffet (on loan from Udinese)
2	DF	ITA	Luca Vignali
3	DF	URU	Juan Ramos
4	MF	ITA	Gennaro Acampora
5	DF	ITA	Riccardo Marchizza (on loan from Sassuolo)
6	MF	ITA	Luca Mora
7	FW	ITA	Antonio Di Gaudio (on loan from Verona)
8	MF	ITA	Matteo Ricci
9	FW	BUL	Andrey Galabinov
10	FW	ITA	Federico Ricci (on loan from Sassuolo)
11	FW	GHA	Emmanuel Gyasi
12	GK	LTU	Titas Krapikas
13	DF	ITA	Elio Capradossi
14	FW	FRA	M'Bala Nzola (on loan from Trapani)

No.	Pos.	Nation	Player
15	MF	ITA	Giuseppe Mastinu
16	MF	ITA	Paolo Bartolomei
17	FW	ISL	Sveinn Aron Guðjohnsen
19	DF	ITA	Claudio Terzi (Captain)
20	DF	ITA	Simone Bastoni
21	DF	ESP	Salva Ferrer
23	FW	ARG	Tobías Reinhart (on loan from Temperley)
25	MF	ITA	Giulio Maggiore
26	FW	MAR	Soufiane Bidaoui
28	DF	CRO	Martin Erlić
31	GK	CAN	Axel Desjardins
32	FW	ITA	Antonino Ragusa (on loan from Verona)
33	DF	ITA	Luigi Vitale (on loan from Verona)

=== Out on loan ===
Note: Flags indicate national team as defined under FIFA eligibility rules; some limited exceptions apply. Players may hold more than one non-FIFA nationality.

No.	Pos.	Nation	Player
—	GK	ITA	Simone Barone (at Rimini)
—	DF	ITA	Tommaso Augello (at Sampdoria)
—	DF	ITA	Pietro Ceccaroni (at Venezia)
—	MF	NGR	Theophilus Awua (at Livorno)
—	MF	ITA	Alessandro Bordin (at Pistoiese)
—	MF	ITA	Michael D'Eramo (at Rimini)
—	MF	ITA	Matteo Figoli (at Pianese)

No.	Pos.	Nation	Player
—	MF	NGR	Adamo Haruna (at Arzachena)
—	FW	NGR	Suleiman Abdullahi (at (Portugal) Olhanense)
—	FW	ENG	DJ Buffonge (at Pergolettese)
—	FW	NED	Delano Burgzorg (at (Netherlands) Heracles Almelo)
—	FW	ITA	Gregorio Morachioli (at Pistoiese)
—	FW	ITA	Luca Scarlino (at Imolese)
—	FW	ITA	Vincenzo Pinto (at Arzachena)

== Competitions ==
=== Overview ===
Competition	First match	Last match	Starting round	Final position	Record							
Competition	First match	Last match	Starting round	Final position	Pld	W	D	L	GF	GA	GD	Win %
Serie B	25 August 2019	31 July 2020	Matchday 1	3rd	38	17	10	11	54	40	+14	44.74
Serie A promotion play-offs	8 August 2020	20 August 2020	Semi-finals	Winners	4	2	0	2	4	4	+0	50.00
Coppa Italia	11 August 2019	18 August 2019	Second round	Third round	2	1	0	1	5	1	+4	50.00
Total					44	20	10	14	63	45	+18	45.45

Source: Soccerway

=== Serie B ===
==== League table ====
Pos	Team	Pld	W	D	L	GF	GA	GD	Pts	Promotion, qualification or relegation
1	Benevento (C, P)	38	26	8	4	67	27	+40	86	Promotion to Serie A
2	Crotone (P)	38	20	8	10	63	40	+23	68	Promotion to Serie A
3	Spezia (O, P)	38	17	10	11	54	40	+14	61	Qualification for promotion play-offs semi-finals
4	Pordenone	38	16	10	12	48	46	+2	58 (Note: Pordenone finished ahead of Cittadella on head-to-head points: Pordenone 0–0 Cittadella, Cittadella 0–2 Pordenone.)	Qualification for promotion play-offs semi-finals
5	Cittadella	38	17	7	14	49	49	0	58	Qualification for promotion play-offs preliminary round

Source: Lega Serie B (in Italian) SOCCERWAY (in English)
Rules for classification: 1) Points; 2) Head-to-head points; 3) Head-to-head goal difference; 4) Goal difference; 5) Goals scored; 6) Draw.
(C) Champions; (O) Play-off winners; (P) Promoted

==== Results by round ====
Round	1	2	3	4	5	6	7	8	9	10	11	12	13	14	15	16	17	18	19	20	21	22	23	24	25	26	27	28	29	30	31	32	33	34	35	36	37	38
Ground	A	H	A	H	A	H	H	A	H	A	H	A	H	A	H	A	H	A	H	H	A	H	A	H	A	A	H	A	H	A	H	A	H	A	H	A	H	A
Result	W	L	L	D	L	L	L	W	W	D	D	L	W	D	W	D	W	D	W	D	W	W	W	W	D	L	W	L	W	W	L	L	W	W	L	D	D	W
Position	2	8	12	13	15	16	18	17	15	16	15	17	16	16	13	14	14	14	12	13	11	9	3	2	3	4	4	5	4	3	4	6	4	3	3	3	3	3

A = Away; H = Home; W = Win; D = Draw; L = Loss

==== Matches ====
24 August 2019 1	Cittadella	0–3	Spezia	Cittadella
CEST (UTC+2)				Stadium: Stadio Pier Cesare Tombolato

31 August 2019 2	Spezia	1–2	Crotone	La Spezia
18:00 CEST (UTC+2)				Stadium: Alberto Picco

13 September 2019 3	Pordenone	1–0	Spezia	Udine
CEST (UTC+2)				Stadium: Stadio Friuli

21 September 2019 4	Spezia	2–2	Perugia	La Spezia
CEST (UTC+2)				Stadium: Alberto Picco

24 September 2019 5	Ascoli	3–0	Spezia	Ascoli Piceno
CEST (UTC+2)				Stadium: Stadio Cino e Lillo Del Duca

29 September 2019 6	Spezia	2–4	Trapani	La Spezia
CEST (UTC+2)				Stadium: Alberto Picco

5 October 2019 7	Spezia	0–1	Benevento	La Spezia
CEST (UTC+2)				Stadium: Alberto Picco

19 October 2019 8	Pescara	1–2	Spezia	Pescara
CET (UTC+1)				Stadium: Stadio Adriatico – Giovanni Cornacchia

26 October 2019 9	Spezia	2–0	Juve Stabia	La Spezia
CEST (UTC+2)				Stadium: Alberto Picco

29 October 2019 10	Empoli	1–1	Spezia	Empoli
CET (UTC+1)				Stadium: Stadio Carlo Castellani

1 November 2019 11	Spezia	0–0	Chievo	La Spezia
CET (UTC+1)				Stadium: Alberto Picco

9 November 2019 12	Pisa	3–2	Spezia	Pisa
CET (UTC+1)				Stadium: Arena Garibaldi – Stadio Romeo Anconetani

24 November 2019 13	Spezia	2–0	Frosinone	La Spezia
CET (UTC+1)				Stadium: Alberto Picco

29 November 2019 14	Cosenza	1–1	Spezia	Cosenza
CEST (UTC+2)				Stadium: Stadium Gigi Marulla

7 December 2019 15	Spezia	2–0	Livorno	La Spezia
CET (UTC+1)				Stadium: Alberto Picco

14 December 2019 16	Venezia	0–0	Spezia	Venice
CEST (UTC+2)				Stadium: Pier Luigi Penzo Stadium

26 December 2019 18	Virtus Entella	0–0	Spezia	Chiavari
CEST (UTC+1)				Stadium: Stadio Comunale

29 December 2019 19	Spezia	2–1	Salernitana	La Spezia
CET (UTC+1)				Stadium: Alberto Picco

19 January 2020 20	Spezia	1–1	Cittadella	La Spezia
CET (UTC+1)				Stadium: Alberto Picco

26 January 2020 21	Crotone	1–2	Spezia	Crotone
15:00 CEST (UTC+2)				Stadium: Stadio Ezio Scida

1 February 2020 22	Spezia	1–0	Pordenone	La Spezia
CET (UTC+1)				Stadium: Alberto Picco

8 February 2020 23	Perugia	0–3	Spezia	Perugia
CET (UTC+1)				Stadium: Stadio Renato Curi

11 February 2020 17	Spezia	3–2	Cremonese	La Spezia
CET (UTC+1)				Stadium: Alberto Picco

15 February 2020 24	Spezia	3–1	Ascoli	La Spezia
CET (UTC+1)				Stadium: Alberto Picco

22 February 2020 25	Trapani	1–1	Spezia	Trapani
CET (UTC+1)				Stadium: Stadio Polisportivo Provinciale

29 February 2020 26	Benevento	3–1	Spezia	Benevento
CEST (UTC+2)				Stadium: Stadio Ciro Vigorito

4 March 2020 27	Spezia	2–0	Pescara	La Spezia
CET (UTC+1)				Stadium: Alberto Picco

8 March 2020 28	Juve Stabia	3–1	Spezia	Castellammare di Stabia
CEST (UTC+2)				Stadium: Stadio Romeo Menti

19 June 2020 29	Spezia	1–0	Empoli	La Spezia
CEST (UTC+2)				Stadium: Alberto Picco

26 June 2020 30	Chievo	1–3	Spezia	Verona
CEST (UTC+2)				Stadium: Marcantonio Bentegodi

29 June 2020 31	Spezia	1–2	Pisa	La Spezia
CEST (UTC+2)				Stadium: Alberto Picco

3 July 2020 32	Frosinone	2–1	Spezia	Frosinone
CEST (UTC+2)				Stadium: Stadio Benito Stirpe

10 July 2020 33	Spezia	5–1	Cosenza	La Spezia
CEST (UTC+2)				Stadium: Alberto Picco

13 July 2020 34	Livorno	0–1	Spezia	Livorno
CEST (UTC+2)				Stadium: Armando Picchi Stadium

17 July 2020 35	Spezia	0–1	Venezia	La Spezia
CEST (UTC+2)				Stadium: Alberto Picco

24 July 2020 36	Cremonese	0–0	Spezia	Cremona
CEST (UTC+2)				Stadium: Stadio Giovanni Zini

27 July 2020 37	Spezia	0–0	Virtus Entella	La Spezia
CEST (UTC+2)				Stadium: Alberto Picco

31 July 2020 38	Salernitana	1–2	Spezia	Salerno
CEST (UTC+2)				Stadium: Stadio Arechi

==== Promotion play-offs ====
8 August 2020 Semi-finals; First leg	Chievo	2–0	Spezia	Verona
21:00 CEST (UTC+2)	Đorđević 2'; Segre 9'			Stadium: Marcantonio Bentegodi; Attendance: 0 Referee: Riccardo Ros

11 August 2020 Semi-finals; Second leg	Spezia	3–1 (3–3 agg.)	Chievo	La Spezia
21:00 CEST (UTC+2)	Galabinov 2'; Maggiore 50'; Nzola 53'		Leverbe 90+3' (pen.)	Stadium: Alberto Picco; Attendance: 0 Referee: Eugenio Abbattista

16 August 2020 Finals; First leg	Frosinone	0–1	Spezia	Frosinone
21:15 CEST (UTC+2)			Gyasi 21'	Stadium: Benito Stirpe; Attendance: 0 Referee: Francesco Fourneau

20 August 2020 Finals; Second leg	Spezia	0–1 (1–1 agg.)	Frosinone	La Spezia
21:15 CEST (UTC+2)			Rohdén 61'	Stadium: Alberto Picco; Attendance: 0 Referee: Gianluca Sacchi

=== Coppa Italia ===
11 August 2019 Second round	Spezia	5–0	Pro Patria	La Spezia
18:00 CEST (UTC+2)	Gyasi 15'; Guðjohnsen 25'; F. Ricci 53'; M. Ricci 64'; Burgzorg 90+2'			Stadium: Stadio Alberto Picco

18 August 2019 Third round	Sassuolo	1–0	Spezia	Reggio Emilia
20:45 CEST (UTC+2)	Traorè 9'	Report		Stadium: Mapei Stadium – Città del Tricolore; Attendance: 2,930; Referee: Rosario Abisso
