= 2021–22 Spezia Calcio season =

Spezia
2021–22 season
- Owner: Robert Platek
- Chairman: Philip Platek
- Manager: Thiago Motta
- Stadium: Stadio Alberto Picco
- Serie A: 16th
- Coppa Italia: Second round
- Top goalscorer: League: Daniele Verde (8); All: Daniele Verde (8)
| colours | Away colours | Third colours |

The 2021–22 season was the 115th season in the existence of Spezia Calcio and the club's second consecutive season in the top flight of Italian football. In addition to the domestic league, Spezia participated in that season's edition of the Coppa Italia.

== Season overview ==
On 5 July 2021, Thiago Motta was appointed head coach, replacing Vincenzo Italiano who had left for Fiorentina.

On 16 July, Spezia were banned from four transfer windows, starting in January 2022, after breaching FIFA rules on signing minors. The club were also fined 500,000 Swiss francs ($543,832) for the offense.

On 28 June 2022, Motta left Spezia by mutual agreement.

== Players ==
=== First-team squad ===
As of 1 November 2021

Note: Flags indicate national team as defined under FIFA eligibility rules; some limited exceptions apply. Players may hold more than one non-FIFA nationality.

| No. | Pos. | Nation | Player |
|---|---|---|---|
| 1 | GK | NED | Jeroen Zoet |
| 6 | MF | MAR | Mehdi Bourabia (on loan from Sassuolo) |
| 7 | DF | ITA | Jacopo Sala |
| 8 | MF | UKR | Viktor Kovalenko (on loan from Atalanta) |
| 9 | FW | ALB | Rey Manaj (on loan from Barcelona) |
| 10 | FW | ITA | Daniele Verde |
| 11 | FW | GHA | Emmanuel Gyasi |
| 13 | DF | POL | Arkadiusz Reca (on loan from Atalanta) |
| 14 | DF | POL | Jakub Kiwior |
| 15 | DF | BUL | Petko Hristov |
| 17 | FW | ISR | Suf Podgoreanu |
| 18 | FW | ANG | M'Bala Nzola |
| 19 | FW | GAM | Ebrima Colley (on loan from Atalanta) |
| 20 | DF | ITA | Simone Bastoni |
| 21 | DF | ESP | Salva Ferrer |
| 22 | FW | FRA | Janis Antiste |

| No. | Pos. | Nation | Player |
|---|---|---|---|
| 25 | MF | ITA | Giulio Maggiore (captain) |
| 27 | DF | FRA | Kelvin Amian |
| 28 | DF | CRO | Martin Erlić (on loan from Sassuolo) |
| 29 | FW | ITA | Eddie Salcedo (on loan from Inter) |
| 31 | MF | SWE | Aimar Sher |
| 33 | MF | COL | Kevin Agudelo (on loan from Genoa) |
| 39 | MF | FRA | Aurélien Nguiamba |
| 40 | GK | BIH | Petar Zovko |
| 43 | DF | GRE | Dimitris Nikolaou |
| 44 | FW | SVK | David Strelec |
| 77 | DF | ITA | Nicolò Bertola |
| 80 | MF | ITA | Niccolò Pietra |
| 88 | MF | BRA | Léo Sena |
| 94 | GK | ITA | Ivan Provedel |
| 99 | FW | ITA | Diego Zuppel |

=== Out on loan ===
As of 3 September 2021

Note: Flags indicate national team as defined under FIFA eligibility rules; some limited exceptions apply. Players may hold more than one non-FIFA nationality.

| No. | Pos. | Nation | Player |
|---|---|---|---|
| — | DF | ITA | Lorenzo Colombini (at Giana Erminio until 30 June 2022) |
| — | DF | ITA | Elio Capradossi (at SPAL until 30 June 2022) |
| — | DF | SWE | Emil Holm (at (Denmark) SønderjyskE until 30 June 2022) |
| — | DF | ITA | Luca Vignali (at Como until 30 June 2022) |
| — | MF | DEN | Emil Kornvig (at (Denmark) SønderjyskE until 30 June 2022) |
| — | MF | ITA | Matteo Figoli (at Carrarese until 30 June 2022) |

| No. | Pos. | Nation | Player |
|---|---|---|---|
| — | FW | ALB | Kleis Bozhanaj (at (Portugal) Casa Pia until 30 June 2022) |
| — | FW | ISL | Mikael Egill Ellertsson (at SPAL until 30 June 2022) |
| — | FW | SVK | Samuel Mráz (at (Slovakia) Slovan Bratislava until 30 June 2022) |
| — | FW | POR | Leandro Sanca (at (Portugal) Casa Pia until 30 June 2022) |
| — | FW | MNE | Ognjen Stijepović (at Pistoiese until 30 June 2022) |

== Transfers and loans ==
=== Transfers in ===
| Entry date | Position | Player | From club | Fee | Ref. |
|---|---|---|---|---|---|
| 5 July 2021 | DF | (Bulgaria) Petko Hristov | Fiorentina | Free | |
| 12 July 2021 | GK | (Bosnia and Herzegovina) Petar Zovko | Sampdoria | Free | |
| 22 July 2021 | DF | (France) Kelvin Amian | (France) Toulouse | €3,200,000 | |

== Pre-season and friendlies ==
Win Draw Loss Fixtures

Spezia announced a squad of 24 players to take part in pre-season training, beginning on 12 July 2021.

| 24 July 2021 Friendly | Spezia | Cancelled | Lecce | Arco di Trento, Italy |
| 17:00 CEST (UTC+2) | | | | Stadium: Stadio Comunale di Arco |

| 30 July 2021 Friendly | Sampdoria | Cancelled | Spezia | Cles, Italy |
| 17:00 CEST (UTC+2) | | | | Stadium: Campo Sportivo Cles |

| 31 July 2021 Friendly | Spezia | Cancelled | Montebelluna | Ronzone, Italy |
| 17:00 CEST (UTC+2) | | | | Stadium: Campo sportivo Ronzone |

| 3 August 2021 Friendly | Spezia | Cancelled | Trento | Ronzone, Italy |
| 17:00 CEST (UTC+2) | | | | Stadium: Campo sportivo Ronzone |

| 6 August 2021 Friendly | Spezia | Cancelled | Cremonese | Cles, Italy |
| 17:00 CEST (UTC+2) | | | | Stadium: Campo Sportivo Cles |

== Competitions ==
=== Overall record ===
| Competition | First match | Last match | Starting round | Final position | Record | | | | | | | |
| Competition | First match | Last match | Starting round | Final position | Pld | W | D | L | GF | GA | GD | Win % |
|---|---|---|---|---|---|---|---|---|---|---|---|---|
| Serie A | 22 August 2021 | 22 May 2022 | Matchday 1 | 16th | 38 | 10 | 6 | 22 | 41 | 71 | −30 | 26.32 |
| Coppa Italia | 13 August 2021 | 16 December 2021 | First round | Second round | 2 | 1 | 0 | 1 | 3 | 3 | +0 | 50.00 |
| Total | | | | | 40 | 11 | 6 | 23 | 44 | 74 | −30 | 27.50 |

Source: Soccerway

=== Serie A ===
==== League table ====
| Pos | Team | Pld | W | D | L | GF | GA | GD | Pts | Qualification or relegation |
|---|---|---|---|---|---|---|---|---|---|---|
| 14 | Empoli | 38 | 10 | 11 | 17 | 50 | 70 | −20 | 41 | |
| 15 | Sampdoria | 38 | 10 | 6 | 22 | 46 | 63 | −17 | 36 | |
| 16 | Spezia | 38 | 10 | 6 | 22 | 41 | 71 | −30 | 36 | |
| 17 | Salernitana | 38 | 7 | 10 | 21 | 33 | 78 | −45 | 31 | |
| 18 | Cagliari (R) | 38 | 6 | 12 | 20 | 34 | 68 | −34 | 30 | Relegation to Serie B |

Source: Serie A
Rules for classification: 1) Points; 2) Head-to-head points; 3) Head-to-head goal difference; 4) Goal difference; 5) Goals scored; 6) Draw. (Note: Head-to-head record is used only after all the matches between the teams in question have been played)
(R) Relegated

==== Results summary ====
| Overall | | | | | | | | Home | | | | | | Away | | | | | |
| Pld | W | D | L | GF | GA | GD | Pts | W | D | L | GF | GA | GD | W | D | L | GF | GA | GD |
|---|---|---|---|---|---|---|---|---|---|---|---|---|---|---|---|---|---|---|---|
| 38 | 10 | 6 | 22 | 41 | 71 | −30 | 36 | 5 | 3 | 11 | 21 | 30 | −9 | 5 | 3 | 11 | 20 | 41 | −21 |

Source: Serie A

==== Results by round ====
| Round | 1 | 2 | 3 | 4 | 5 | 6 | 7 | 8 | 9 | 10 | 11 | 12 | 13 | 14 | 15 | 16 | 17 | 18 | 19 | 20 | 21 | 22 | 23 | 24 | 25 | 26 | 27 | 28 | 29 | 30 | 31 | 32 | 33 | 34 | 35 | 36 | 37 | 38 |
|---|---|---|---|---|---|---|---|---|---|---|---|---|---|---|---|---|---|---|---|---|---|---|---|---|---|---|---|---|---|---|---|---|---|---|---|---|---|---|
| Ground | A | A | H | A | H | H | A | H | A | H | A | H | A | H | A | H | A | H | A | H | A | A | H | A | H | A | H | A | H | A | H | A | H | A | H | H | A | H |
| Result | D | L | L | W | L | L | L | W | L | D | L | W | L | L | L | D | L | D | W | L | W | W | W | D | L | L | L | L | W | L | W | D | L | L | L | L | W | L |
| Position | 12 | 15 | 18 | 13 | 17 | 17 | 19 | 16 | 17 | 17 | 18 | 16 | 17 | 17 | 17 | 17 | 17 | 17 | 17 | 17 | 16 | 14 | 14 | 15 | 15 | 15 | 16 | 16 | 15 | 16 | 15 | 15 | 15 | 15 | 16 | 16 | 16 | 16 |

Updated to match(es) played on 22 May 2022. Source: Serie A
A = Away; H = Home; W = Win; D = Draw; L = Loss

==== Matches ====
The league fixtures were announced on 14 July 2021.

| 23 August 2021 1 | Cagliari | 2–2 | Spezia | Cagliari |
| 18:30 CEST (UTC+2) | João Pedro 62', 66' (pen.); Zappa (yellow card) 79'; Strootman (yellow card) 82' | Report | Gyasi 7', (yellow card) 66'; Bastoni (yellow card) 14', (goal) 58'; Nikolaou (yellow card) 45+1' | Stadium: Sardegna Arena; Attendance: 5,387; Referee: Francesco Fourneau |

| 28 August 2021 2 | Lazio | 6–1 | Spezia | Rome |
| 18:30 CEST (UTC+2) | Immobile 5', 15', 45+2', (penalty missed) 45+1'; Felipe Anderson 47'; Hysaj 70'; Luis Alberto 85' | Report | Verde 4'; Erlić (yellow card) 45+1'; Gyasi (yellow card) 49'; Amian (red card) 54' | Stadium: Stadio Olimpico; Attendance: 22,000; Referee: Federico Dionisi |

| 12 September 2021 3 | Spezia | 0–1 | Udinese | La Spezia |
| 15:00 CEST (UTC+2) | Nikolaou (yellow card) 14' | Report | Pussetto (yellow card) 13'; Arslan (yellow card) 14'; Samardžić 89' | Stadium: Stadio Alberto Picco; Attendance: 5,162; Referee: Marco Guida |

| 19 September 2021 4 | Venezia | 1–2 | Spezia | Ferrara |
| 15:00 CEST (UTC+2) | Mazzocchi (yellow card) 26'; Vacca (yellow card) 57'; Ceccaroni 59'; Busio (yellow card) 69'; Heymans (yellow card) 84' | Report | Bastoni 13'; Ferrer (yellow card) 47'; Bourabia 90+4' | Stadium: Stadio Paolo Mazza; Attendance: 3,688; Referee: Rosario Abisso |

| 22 September 2021 5 | Spezia | 2–3 | Juventus | La Spezia |
| 18:30 CEST (UTC+2) | Gyasi 33'; Antiste 49'; Nikolaou (yellow card) 85'; Nzola (yellow card) 90+4' | Report | Kean 28'; Chiesa 66'; De Ligt 72'; Morata (yellow card) 90+1' | Stadium: Stadio Alberto Picco; Attendance: 5,700; Referee: Gianluca Aureliano |

| 25 September 2021 6 | Spezia | 1–2 | Milan | La Spezia |
| 15:00 CEST (UTC+2) | Sala (yellow card) 25'; Verde 80'; Nikolaou (yellow card) 89' | Report | Maldini 48', (yellow card) 58'; Brahim 87'; Hernandez (yellow card) 90' | Stadium: Stadio Alberto Picco; Attendance: 3,618; Referee: Gianluca Manganiello |

| 3 October 2021 7 | Hellas Verona | 4–0 | Spezia | Verona |
| 15:00 CEST (UTC+2) | Simeone 4'; Faraoni 15'; Caprari (yellow card) 28', (goal) 42'; Bessa 71' | Report | Ferrer (yellow card) 40'; Bastoni (red card) 82' | Stadium: Stadio Marcantonio Bentegodi; Attendance: 8,398; Referee: Giacomo Camplone |

| 16 October 2021 8 | Spezia | 2–1 | Salernitana | La Spezia |
| 15:00 CEST (UTC+2) | Strelec 51'; Gyasi (yellow card) 62'; Kovalenko 76'; Manaj (yellow card) 90' | Report | Simy 39'; Obi (yellow card) 53'; Coulibaly (yellow card) 60'; Ranieri (yellow card) 80' | Stadium: Stadio Alberto Picco; Attendance: 6,023; Referee: Davide Massa |

| 22 October 2021 9 | Sampdoria | 2–1 | Spezia | Genoa |
| 20:45 CEST (UTC+2) | Gyasi 15' (o.g.); Candreva 36', (yellow card) 57'; Bereszyński (yellow card) 44'; Colley (yellow card) 45+2' | Report | Hristov (yellow card) 14'; Verde 90+5' | Stadium: Stadio Luigi Ferraris; Attendance: 7,493; Referee: Michael Fabbri |

| 26 October 2021 10 | Spezia | 1–1 | Genoa | La Spezia |
| 18:30 CEST (UTC+2) | Bastoni (yellow card) 55'; Sirigu 66' (o.g.); Provedel (yellow card) 85' | Report | Biraschi (yellow card) 60'; Kallon (yellow card) 65'; Caicedo (yellow card) 79'; Criscito 86' (pen.); Masiello (yellow card) 89' | Stadium: Stadio Alberto Picco; Attendance: 7,283; Referee: Simone Sozza |

| 31 October 2021 11 | Fiorentina | 3–0 | Spezia | Florence |
| 15:00 CET (UTC+1) | Martínez Quarta (yellow card) 36'; Vlahović 44' (pen.), 62', 74', (yellow card) 75'; Venuti (yellow card) 55'; Maleh (yellow card) 82' | Report | Ferrer (yellow card) 21'; Gyasi (yellow card) 43'; Colley (yellow card) 58' | Stadium: Stadio Artemio Franchi; Attendance: 19,511; Referee: Antonio Giua |

| 6 November 2021 12 | Spezia | 1–0 | Torino | La Spezia |
| 15:00 CET (UTC+1) | Sala 58'; Amian (yellow card) 65'; Nikolaou (yellow card) 76'; Kovalenko (yellow card) 89' | Report | Rincón (yellow card) 38'; Linetty (yellow card) 53'; Sanabria (yellow card) 76' | Stadium: Stadio Alberto Picco; Attendance: 6,953; Referee: Daniele Orsato |

| 20 November 2021 13 | Atalanta | 5–2 | Spezia | Bergamo |
| 15:00 CET (UTC+1) | Koopmeiners (yellow card) 10'; Pašalić 18', 41', (yellow card) 71'; Zapata 38' (pen.); Muriel 83'; Malinovskyi 89' | Report | Gyasi (yellow card) 5'; Nzola 11', 90+1'; Sala (yellow card) 36'; Hristov (yellow card) 49' | Stadium: Gewiss Stadium; Attendance: 10,744; Referee: Rosario Abisso |

| 28 November 2021 14 | Spezia | 0–1 | Bologna | La Spezia |
| 15:00 CET (UTC+1) | Reca (yellow card) 38'; Salcedo (yellow card) 71'; Nzola (yellow card) 82' | Report | Arnautović 83' (pen.), (yellow card) 88' | Stadium: Stadio Alberto Picco; Attendance: 6,265; Referee: Luca Massimi |

| 1 December 2021 15 | Internazionale | 2–0 | Spezia | Milan |
| 18:30 CET (UTC+1) | Gagliardini 36'; Martínez (yellow card) 44', (goal) 58' (pen.) | Report | Manaj (yellow card) 31'; Kiwior (yellow card) 57' | Stadium: San Siro; Attendance: 30,076; Referee: Davide Ghersini |

| 5 December 2021 16 | Spezia | 2–2 | Sassuolo | La Spezia |
| 15:00 CET (UTC+1) | Reca (yellow card) 1'; Maggiore (yellow card) 4'; Sala (yellow card) 26'; Manaj 35'; Gyasi 48'; Hristov (yellow card) 90' | Report | Frattesi (yellow card) 44'; Raspadori 66', 79'; Kyriakopoulos (yellow card) 74'; Berardi (yellow card) 85' | Stadium: Stadio Alberto Picco; Attendance: 4,987; Referee: Fabio Maresca |

| 13 December 2021 17 | Roma | 2–0 | Spezia | Rome |
| 20:45 CET (UTC+1) | Smalling 6'; Viña (yellow card) 54'; Ibañez 56'; Kumbulla (yellow card) 65'; Afena-Gyan (yellow card) 70' (yellow-red card) 90+3' | Report | Gyasi (yellow card) 90+2' | Stadium: Stadio Olimpico; Attendance: 44,844; Referee: Alessandro Prontera |

| 19 December 2021 18 | Spezia | 1–1 | Empoli | La Spezia |
| 15:00 CET (UTC+1) | Maggiore (yellow card) 21'; Marchizza 50' (o.g.); Amian (yellow card) 88'; Kovalenko (yellow card) 90' | Report | Tonelli (yellow card) 38'; Bandinelli (yellow card) 60'; Nikolaou 71' (o.g.) | Stadium: Stadio Alberto Picco; Attendance: 5,414; Referee: Lorenzo Maggioni |

| 22 December 2021 19 | Napoli | 0–1 | Spezia | Naples |
| 20:45 CET (UTC+1) | Mário Rui (yellow card) 45+1'; Petagna (yellow card) 75' | Report | Maggiore (yellow card) 19'; Juan Jesus 37' (o.g.); Kiwior (yellow card) 48'; Manaj (yellow card) 51' | Stadium: Stadio Diego Armando Maradona; Attendance: 25,000; Referee: Luca Massimi |

| 6 January 2022 20 | Spezia | 1–2 | Hellas Verona | La Spezia |
| 14:30 CET (UTC+1) | Verde (yellow card) 75'; Agudelo (yellow card) 78', (red card) 87'; Erlić 85' | Report | Veloso (yellow card) 29'; Casale (yellow card) 45'; Caprari 59', 70' | Stadium: Stadio Alberto Picco; Attendance: 3,250; Referee: Maurizio Mariani |

| 9 January 2022 21 | Genoa | 0–1 | Spezia | Genoa |
| 18:30 CET (UTC+1) | Ekuban (yellow card) 5'; Destro (yellow card) 16'; Vásquez (yellow card) 54' | Report | Bastoni 14'; Manaj (yellow card) 55'; Maggiore (yellow card) 82'; Amian (yellow card) 90+4' | Stadium: Stadio Luigi Ferraris; Attendance: 8,000; Referee: Marco Guida |

| 17 January 2022 22 | Milan | 1–2 | Spezia | Milan |
| 18:30 CET (UTC+1) | Kalulu (yellow card) 22'; Hernandez (penalty missed) 45'; Leão 45+1'; Gabbia (yellow card) 62' | Report | Gyasi (yellow card) 19', (goal) 90+6'; Kiwior (yellow card) 32'; Provedel (yellow card) 45'; Agudelo 64'; Maggiore (yellow card) 65'; Nikolaou (yellow card) 90+3' | Stadium: San Siro; Attendance: 5,000; Referee: Marco Serra |

| 23 January 2022 23 | Spezia | 1–0 | Sampdoria | La Spezia |
| 15:00 CET (UTC+1) | Erlić (yellow card) 30'; Verde 69', (yellow card) 71' | Report | Thorsby (yellow card) 37'; Ekdal (yellow card) 47' (yellow-red card) 73'; Rincón (yellow card) 52' | Stadium: Stadio Alberto Picco; Attendance: 5,000; Referee: Gianluca Manganiello |

| 7 February 2022 24 | Salernitana | 2–2 | Spezia | Salerno |
| 20:45 CET (UTC+1) | Verdi 3', 16'; Mousset (yellow card) 30'; Fazio (yellow card) 53'; Radovanović (yellow card) 90+1' | Report | Manaj 12' (pen.); Amian (yellow card) 15'; Verde 30' (pen.); Kiwior (yellow card) 88'; Nguiamba (yellow card) 90+4' | Stadium: Stadio Arechi; Attendance: 10,668; Referee: Paolo Valeri |

| 14 February 2022 25 | Spezia | 1–2 | Fiorentina | La Spezia |
| 20:45 CET (UTC+1) | Agudelo 74'; Reca (yellow card) 78'; Amian (yellow card) 84' | Report | Piątek (penalty missed) 16', 42'; Castrovilli (yellow card) 67'; Amrabat 89' | Stadium: Stadio Alberto Picco; Attendance: 5,400; Referee: Matteo Marchetti |

| 21 February 2022 26 | Bologna | 2–1 | Spezia | Bologna |
| 21:00 CET (UTC+1) | Binks (yellow card) 19'; Arnautović 40', 84' | Report | Manaj 11', (yellow card) 22' | Stadium: Stadio Renato Dall'Ara; Attendance: 12,050; Referee: Livio Marinelli |

| 27 February 2022 27 | Spezia | 0–1 | Roma | La Spezia |
| 18:05 CET (UTC+1) | Agudelo (yellow card) 30'; Amian (yellow card) 39' (yellow-red card) 45'; Kiwior (yellow card) 86'; Maggiore (yellow card) 90+7' | Report | Mancini (yellow card) 45+3'; Kumbulla (yellow card) 64'; Zaniolo (yellow card) 90+5'; Abraham 90+9' (pen.) | Stadium: Stadio Alberto Picco; Attendance: 8,107; Referee: Michael Fabbri |

| 6 March 2022 28 | Juventus | 1–0 | Spezia | Turin |
| 18:00 CET (UTC+1) | Morata 21'; Vlahović (yellow card) 57'; Pellegrini (yellow card) 61'; Bernardeschi (yellow card) 68' | Report | Erlić (yellow card) 54'; Bourabia (yellow card) 90+3' | Stadium: Juventus Stadium; Attendance: 26,475; Referee: Francesco Fourneau |

| 12 March 2022 29 | Spezia | 2–0 | Cagliari | La Spezia |
| 15:00 CET (UTC+1) | Verde (penalty missed) 36'; Erlić 55'; Manaj 74', (yellow card) 75' | Report | Pavoletti (yellow card) 30'; João Pedro (yellow card) 45+3'; Goldaniga (yellow card) 75'; Zappa (yellow card) 84' | Stadium: Stadio Alberto Picco; Attendance: 7,180; Referee: Daniele Orsato |

| 18 March 2022 30 | Sassuolo | 4–1 | Spezia | Reggio Emilia |
| 18:45 CET (UTC+1) | Berardi 17' (pen.), 48', (yellow card) 44'; Matheus Henrique (yellow card) 20'; Ayhan 78'; Scamacca 81' | Report | Kovalenko (yellow card) 15'; Verde 36'; Maggiore (yellow card) 55'; Erlić (yellow card) 80' | Stadium: Mapei Stadium – Città del Tricolore; Attendance: 6,130; Referee: Manuel Volpi |

| 2 April 2022 31 | Spezia | 1–0 | Venezia | La Spezia |
| 15:00 CEST (UTC+2) | Maggiore (yellow card) 79'; Manaj (yellow card) 85'; Gyasi 90+4', (yellow card) 90+6' | Report | Okereke (yellow card) 90+3' | Stadium: Stadio Alberto Picco; Attendance: 7,993; Referee: Daniele Doveri |

| 9 April 2022 32 | Empoli | 0–0 | Spezia | Empoli |
| 15:00 CEST (UTC+2) | Di Francesco (yellow card) 11'; Żurkowski (yellow card) 20' | Report | Gyasi (yellow card) 27'; Amian (yellow card) 29' | Stadium: Stadio Carlo Castellani; Attendance: 5,265; Referee: Giovanni Ayroldi |

| 15 April 2022 33 | Spezia | 1–3 | Internazionale | La Spezia |
| 19:00 CEST (UTC+2) | Bastoni (yellow card) 10'; Nikolaou (yellow card) 86'; Maggiore 88' | Report | Brozović 31'; Martínez 73'; Sánchez 90+4' | Stadium: Stadio Alberto Picco; Attendance: 11,382; Referee: Fabio Maresca |

| 23 April 2022 34 | Torino | 2–1 | Spezia | Turin |
| 15:00 CEST (UTC+2) | Lukić 4' (pen.), 69'; Bremer (yellow card) 62' | Report | Erlić (yellow card) 3'; Nikolaou (yellow card) 24'; Manaj 90+6' (pen.) | Stadium: Stadio Olimpico Grande Torino; Attendance: 8,333; Referee: Davide Ghersini |

| 30 April 2022 35 | Spezia | 3–4 | Lazio | La Spezia |
| 20:45 CEST (UTC+2) | Amian 9', (yellow card) 64'; Agudelo 35'; Hristov 56'; Manaj (yellow card) 64'; Kovalenko (yellow card) 90+2' | Report | Immobile 33' (pen.); Zaccagni (yellow card) 37'; Provedel 54' (o.g.); Milinković-Savić 68'; Acerbi 90' | Stadium: Stadio Alberto Picco; Attendance: 8,750; Referee: Luca Pairetto |

| 8 May 2022 36 | Spezia | 1–3 | Atalanta | La Spezia |
| 12:30 CEST (UTC+2) | Verde 30'; Bastoni (yellow card) 41'; Maggiore (yellow card) 44' | Report | Muriel 16', (yellow card) 62'; Malinovskyi (yellow card) 53'; Freuler (yellow card) 57'; Djimsiti 73'; Pašalić 87' | Stadium: Stadio Alberto Picco; Attendance: 9,231; Referee: Fabio Maresca |

| 14 May 2022 37 | Udinese | 2–3 | Spezia | Udine |
| 18:00 CEST (UTC+2) | Nuytinck (yellow card) 18'; Molina 26'; Pereyra (yellow card) 71'; Marí 90+3'; Arslan (yellow card) 90+3' | Report | Gyasi (yellow card) 19', (goal) 45+3'; Verde 35'; Maggiore 47'; Kiwior (yellow card) 80'; Manaj (penalty missed) 90+1' | Stadium: Stadio Friuli; Attendance: 20,950; Referee: Gianluca Aureliano |

| 22 May 2022 38 | Spezia | 0–3 | Napoli | La Spezia |
| 12:30 CEST (UTC+2) | Manaj (yellow card) 45+10' | Report | Politano 4', (yellow card) 51'; Zieliński 25'; Demme 36'; Ghoulam (yellow card) 66' | Stadium: Stadio Alberto Picco; Attendance: 10,415; Referee: Matteo Marchetti |

=== Coppa Italia ===
| 13 August 2021 First round | Pordenone | 1–3 | Spezia | Lignano Sabbiadoro |
| 17:45 CEST (UTC+2) | Pellegrini (yellow card) 13'; Folorunsho 51' (pen.); Kupisz (yellow card) 59'; Misuraca (yellow card) 82' | Report | Erlić 39'; Nikolaou 45+3'; Mráz (yellow card) 70'; Colley 83' (pen.) | Stadium: Stadio Guido Teghil; Attendance: 600; Referee: Davide Ghersini |

| 16 December 2021 Second round | Spezia | 0–2 | Lecce | La Spezia |
| 18:00 CET (UTC+1) | Strelec (yellow card) 6'; Nzola (yellow card) 30'; Nguiamba (yellow card) 79' | Report | Dermaku (yellow card) 17'; Barreca (yellow card) 35'; Listkowski 43'; Rodríguez (yellow card) 49'; Calabresi 55'; Blin (yellow card) 90+3' | Stadium: Stadio Alberto Picco; Attendance: 1,838; Referee: Valerio Marini |

== Statistics ==
=== Appearances and goals ===
| No. | Pos | Nat | Player | Total | | Serie A | | Coppa Italia | |
| No. | Pos | Nat | Player | Apps | Goals | Apps | Goals | Apps | Goals |
Goalkeepers
| 1 | GK | (Netherlands) NED | Jeroen Zoet | 8 | 0 | 7 | 0 | 1 | 0 |
| 94 | GK | (Italy) ITA | Ivan Provedel | 1 | 0 | 1 | 0 | 0 | 0 |
Defenders
| 7 | DF | (Italy) ITA | Jacopo Sala | 6 | 0 | 3+2 | 0 | 0+1 | 0 |
| 13 | DF | (Poland) POL | Arkadiusz Reca | 1 | 0 | 0+1 | 0 | 0 | 0 |
| 15 | DF | (Bulgaria) BUL | Petko Hristov | 9 | 0 | 6+2 | 0 | 1 | 0 |
| 20 | DF | (Italy) ITA | Simone Bastoni | 7 | 2 | 7 | 2 | 0 | 0 |
| 21 | DF | (Spain) ESP | Salva Ferrer | 9 | 0 | 7+1 | 0 | 1 | 0 |
| 27 | DF | (France) FRA | Kelvin Amian | 7 | 0 | 6 | 0 | 1 | 0 |
| 28 | DF | (Croatia) CRO | Martin Erlic | 4 | 1 | 3 | 0 | 1 | 1 |
| 35 | DF | (Greece) GRE | Dimitris Nikolaou | 9 | 1 | 8 | 0 | 1 | 1 |
Midfielders
| 6 | MF | (Morocco) MAR | Mehdi Bourabia | 4 | 1 | 2+2 | 1 | 0 | 0 |
| 8 | MF | (Ukraine) UKR | Viktor Kovalenko | 3 | 1 | 2 | 1 | 1 | 0 |
| 21 | MF | (Italy) ITA | Giulio Maggiore | 8 | 0 | 7 | 0 | 1 | 0 |
| 31 | MF | (Sweden) SWE | Aimar Sher | 1 | 0 | 0+1 | 0 | 0 | 0 |
| 33 | MF | (Colombia) COL | Kevin Agudelo | 1 | 0 | 0+1 | 0 | 0 | 0 |
| 88 | MF | (Brazil) BRA | Léo Sena | 0 | 0 | 0 | 0 | 0 | 0 |
Forwards
| 9 | FW | (Albania) ALB | Rey Manaj | 5 | 0 | 1+4 | 0 | 0 | 0 |
| 10 | FW | (Italy) ITA | Daniele Verde | 9 | 2 | 5+3 | 2 | 1 | 0 |
| 11 | FW | (Ghana) GHA | Emmanuel Gyasi | 9 | 2 | 8 | 2 | 0+1 | 0 |
| 17 | FW | (Israel) ISR | Suf Podgoreanu | 3 | 0 | 0+3 | 0 | 0 | 0 |
| 18 | FW | (Angola) ANG | M'Bala Nzola | 5 | 0 | 2+3 | 0 | 0 | 0 |
| 19 | FW | (The Gambia) GAM | Ebrima Colley | 4 | 1 | 3 | 0 | 1 | 1 |
| 22 | FW | (France) FRA | Janis Antiste | 7 | 1 | 6+1 | 1 | 0 | 0 |
| 29 | FW | (Italy) ITA | Eddie Salcedo | 3 | 0 | 1+2 | 0 | 0 | 0 |
| 44 | FW | (Slovenia) SLO | David Strelec | 3 | 1 | 1+2 | 1 | 0 | 0 |
Players transferred out during the season

Last updated: 16 October 2021
Source: Competitions
