= M'Bala Nzola =

Angolan footballer (born 1996)

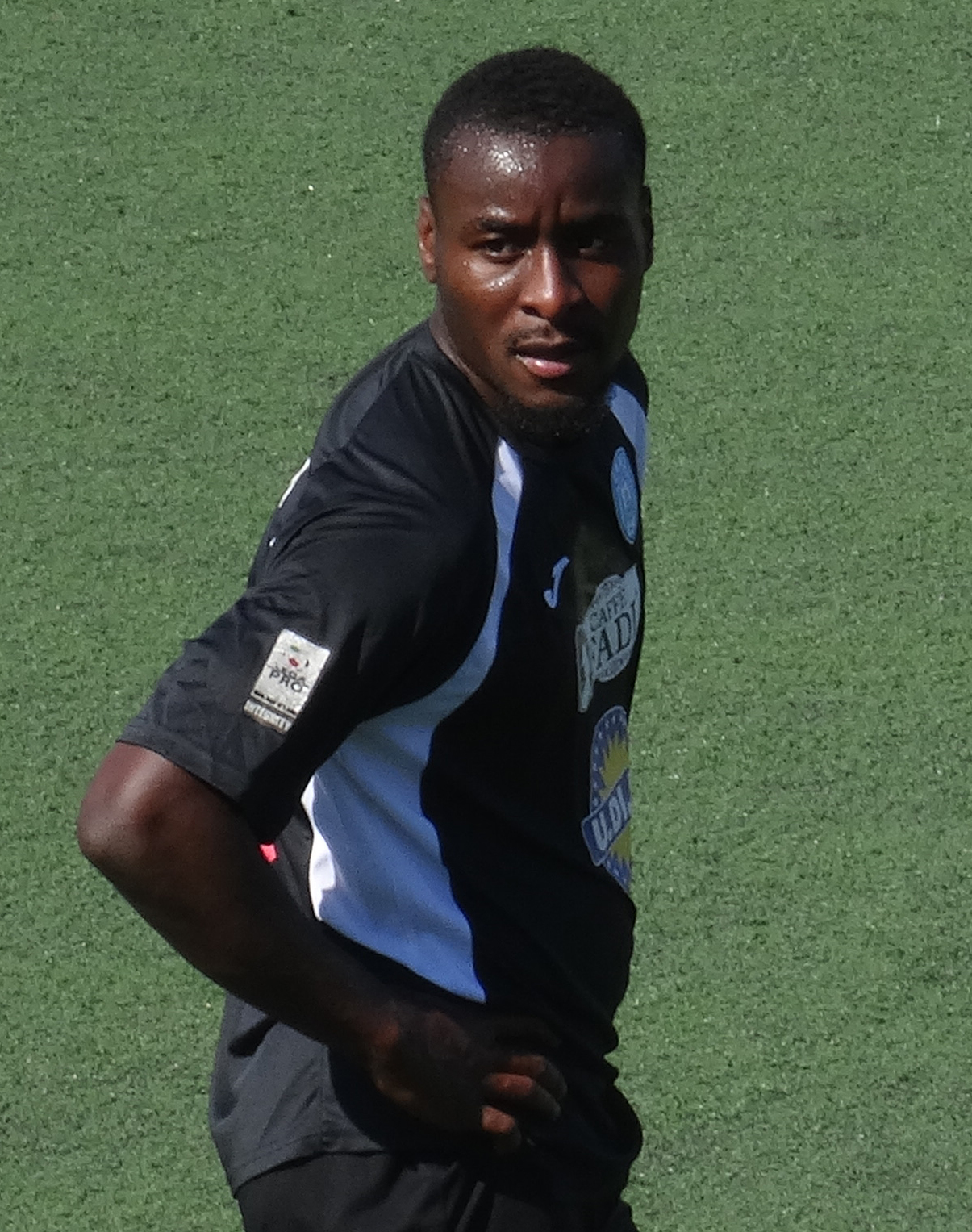
- Nzola with Virtus Francavilla in 2017

Personal information
- Date of birth: 18 August 1996 (age 30)
- Place of birth: Buco-Zau, Angola
- Height: 1.85 m (6 ft 1 in)
- Position: Forward

Team information
- Current team: Cagliari
- Number: 18

Youth career
- 2010–2014: Troyes
- 2014–2015: Académica

Senior career*
Years	Team	Apps	(Gls)
2015	Académica	0	(0)
2015–2016	Sertanense	25	(7)
2016–2017	Virtus Francavilla	33	(11)
2017–2019	Carpi	14	(0)
2018–2019	→ Trapani (loan)	33	(8)
2019–2020	Trapani	12	(1)
2020	→ Spezia (loan)	17	(6)
2020–2023	Spezia	77	(26)
2023–2026	Fiorentina	33	(3)
2024–2025	→ Lens (loan)	21	(6)
2025–2026	→ Pisa (loan)	16	(3)
2026	→ Sassuolo (loan)	14	(1)
2026–	Cagliari	4	(2)

International career^{‡}
2021–	Angola	15	(3)
- * Club domestic league appearances and goals as of 17:21, 1 November 2026 (UTC) ‡ National team caps and goals as of 29 December 2025

M'Bala Nzola (born 18 August 1996) is an Angolan professional footballer who plays as a forward for Serie A club Cagliari and the Angola national team.

== Club career ==
On 28 January 2015, Nzola made his professional debut with Académica de Coimbra in a 2014–15 Taça da Liga match against Porto, coming on as a substitute in the 4–1 away loss.

On 7 August 2016, he joined Lega Pro club Virtus Francavilla.

On 7 August 2017, after helping Virtus Francavilla reach the Lega Pro promotion play-offs, Nzola signed a four-year deal with Carpi.

On 16 August 2018, he joined Serie C club Trapani on a season-long loan. Trapani held the obligation to purchase him from Carpi at the end of the loan term in case of Trapani's promotion to Serie B. On 15 June he scored the first goal for the Trapani victory over Piacenza, and after that Trapani was promoted in Serie B after two years of Serie C.

On 13 January 2020, he joined Serie B club Spezia on loan with an option to purchase.

On 7 October 2020, Nzola signed with Spezia a three-year contract. On 10 August 2023, he joined fellow Italian side Fiorentina.

On 7 August 2025, Nzola was loaned by Pisa, with an option to buy. On 31 January 2026, he moved on a new loan to Sassuolo, also with an option to buy.

On 1 September 2026, Nzola was announced at Cagliari.

== International career ==
Being born in Angola, but raised in France, Nzola was eligible for either country at international level.

In March 2021, some months after he expressed his desire to represent Angola, he received his first call-up to the national team. Some days after, on 25 March 2021, he made his debut for the Palancas Negras against Gambia, in a qualifying match for the Africa Cup of Nations.

In December 2023, he was included in the list of the twenty-seven Angolan players selected by Pedro Gonçalves to compete in the 2023 Africa Cup of Nations, but Nzola declined the call-up. He was later included among the players selected to take part in the 2025 Africa Cup of Nations.

== Personal life ==
Born in Cabinda, an Angolan exclave, Nzola emigrated to France as a child.

== Career statistics ==
=== Club ===
As of match played 1 November 2026

Appearances and goals by club, season and competition
Club	Season	League			National cup (Note: Includes Taça de Portugal, Coppa Italia)		League cup (Note: Includes Taça da Liga)		Europe		Other		Total	
Club	Season	Division	Apps	Goals	Apps	Goals	Apps	Goals	Apps	Goals	Apps	Goals	Apps	Goals
Académica	2014–15	Primeira Liga	0	0	—		2	1	—		—		2	1
Sertanense	2015–16	Campeonato de Portugal	25	7	1	1	—		—		—		26	8
Virtus Francavilla	2016–17	Lega Pro	33	11	3	1	—		—		2 (Note: Appearance in Lega Pro promotion play-offs)	0	38	12
Virtus Francavilla	2017–18	Lega Pro	0	0	1	1	—		—		—		1	1
Virtus Francavilla	Total		33	11	4	2	—		—		2	0	39	13
Carpi	2017–18	Serie B	14	0	2	1	—		—		—		15	1
Trapani (loan)	2018–19	Lega Pro	29	7	3	0	—		—		4	1	36	8
Trapani	2019–20	Serie B	12	1	2	1	—		—		—		14	2
Spezia (loan)	2019–20	Serie B	17	6	0	0	—		—		4 (Note: Appearances in Serie B promotion play-offs)	1	21	7
Spezia	2020–21	Serie A	25	11	0	0	—		—		—		25	11
Spezia	2021–22	Serie A	21	2	1	0	—		—		—		22	2
Spezia	2022–23	Serie A	31	13	2	2	—		—		1 (Note: Appearance in Serie A relegation play-off)	0	34	15
Spezia	Spezia total		94	32	3	2	—		—		5	1	102	35
Fiorentina	2023–24	Serie A	33	3	2	1	—		11 (Note: Appearances in UEFA Europa Conference League)	3	1 (Note: Appearance in Supercoppa Italiana)	0	47	7
Lens (loan)	2024–25	Ligue 1	21	6	1	1	—		1 (Note: Appearances in UEFA Europa League)	0	—		23	7
Pisa (loan)	2025–26	Serie A	16	3	1	0	—		—		—		17	3
Sassuolo (loan)	2025–26	Serie A	14	1	—		—		—		—		14	1
Cagliari	2026–27	Serie A	4	2	0	0	—		—		—		4	2
Career total			295	73	19	6	2	1	12	3	12	2	340	85

=== International ===
As of match played 29 December 2025

Appearances and goals by national team and year
National team	Year	Apps	Goals
Angola	2021	3	1
Angola	2022	2	1
Angola	2023	1	0
Angola	2024	2	0
Angola	2025	7	1
Total		15	3

Scores and results list Angola's goal tally first, score column indicates score after each Nzola goal.

List of international goals scored by M'Bala Nzola
No.	Date	Venue	Opponent	Score	Result	Competition
1	12 November 2021	Estádio 11 de Novembro, Luanda, Angola	Egypt	2–0	2–2	2022 FIFA World Cup qualification
2	1 June 2022	Estádio 11 de Novembro, Luanda, Angola	Central African Republic	1–1	2–1	2023 Africa Cup of Nations qualification
3	9 September 2025	Estádio 11 de Novembro, Luanda, Angola	Mauritius	1–0	3–1	2026 FIFA World Cup qualification
