= Kevin Agudelo =

Colombian footballer (born 1998)

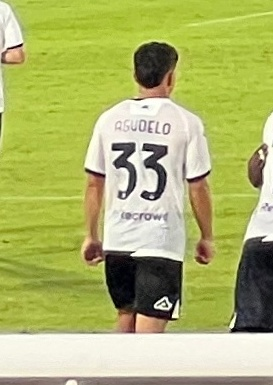
- Agudelo with Spezia in 2022

Personal information
- Full name: Kevin Andrés Agudelo Ardila
- Date of birth: 14 November 1998 (age 27)
- Place of birth: Puerto Caicedo, Colombia
- Height: 1.78 m (5 ft 10 in)
- Position: Attacking midfielder

Team information
- Current team: Al-Nasr
- Number: 7

Senior career*
Years	Team	Apps	(Gls)
2017–2018	Bogotá	11	(0)
2018–2019	Atlético Huila	33	(2)
2019–2022	Genoa	10	(1)
2020	→ Fiorentina (loan)	3	(0)
2020–2022	→ Spezia (loan)	52	(4)
2022–2023	Spezia	35	(0)
2023–	Al-Nasr	22	(5)
2024–2025	→ Al Wahda (loan)	19	(3)
- * Club domestic league appearances and goals as of 09:09, 28 October 2023 (UTC)

Kevin Andrés Agudelo Ardila (born 14 November 1998) is a Colombian professional footballer who plays as an attacking midfielder for UAE Pro League club Al-Nasr.

== Career ==
On 2 August 2019, Agudelo joined Italian club Genoa.

On 31 January 2020, he moved on loan to Fiorentina. Fiorentina will be obligated to purchase his rights permanently if he makes a certain number of appearances.

On 16 September 2020, Agudelo signed for Spezia on a season-long loan with option to buy.

== Personal life ==
In May 2020, he tested positive for COVID-19.

== Career statistics ==
=== Club ===
As of match played 21 July 2024

Appearances and goals by club, season and competition
Club	Season	League			National Cup (Note: Includes Copa Colombia, Coppa Italia)		Europe		Other		Total	
Club	Season	Division	Apps	Goals	Apps	Goals	Apps	Goals	Apps	Goals	Apps	Goals
Bogotá	2017	Categoría Primera B	1	0	2	0	—		—		3	0
Atlético Huila	2018	Categoría Primera A	15	0	2	0	—		—		17	0
Atlético Huila	2019	Categoría Primera A	18	2	1	0	—		—		19	2
Atlético Huila	Total		33	2	3	0	—		—		36	2
Genoa	2019–20	Serie A	10	1	2	0	—		—		12	1
Fiorentina (loan)	2019–20	Serie A	3	0	0	0	—		—		3	0
Spezia (loan)	2020–21	Serie A	29	1	4	0	—		—		33	1
Spezia (loan)	2021–22	Serie A	23	3	1	0	—		—		24	3
Spezia	2022–23	Serie A	34	0	2	0	—		—		36	0
Spezia	Total		86	4	7	0	—		—		93	4
Career total			133	7	14	0	—		—		147	7
