= Petar Zovko =

Bosnian footballer (born 2002)

Personal information
- Date of birth: 25 March 2002 (age 24)
- Place of birth: Mostar, Bosnia and Herzegovina
- Height: 1.92 m (6 ft 4 in)
- Position: Goalkeeper

Team information
- Current team: Lokomotiv Plovdiv
- Number: 40

Youth career
- Široki Brijeg
- 2018–2021: Sampdoria
- 2021–2022: Spezia

Senior career*
Years	Team	Apps	(Gls)
2022–2024	Spezia	2	(0)
2025–	Lokomotiv Plovdiv	5	(0)

International career^{‡}
2018–2019	Bosnia and Herzegovina U17	3	(0)
2023	Bosnia and Herzegovina U21	1	(0)
- * Club domestic league appearances and goals as of 11 June 2026 ‡ National team caps and goals as of 12 September 2023

Petar Zovko (Croatian pronunciation: [pětar zôːʋko]; born 25 March 2002) is a Bosnian professional footballer who plays as a goalkeeper for Bulgarian First League club Lokomotiv Plovdiv.

Zovko started his professional career at Spezia.

== Club career ==
=== Early career ===
Zovko started playing football at Široki Brijeg, before joining the youth academy of Italian team Sampdoria in 2018. In 2021, he moved to Spezia's youth setup. He made his professional debut against Napoli on 22 May 2022 at the age of 20.

== Career statistics ==
=== Club ===
As of match played 22 March 2026

Appearances and goals by club, season and competition
Club	Season	League			National Cup		Europe		Other		Total	
Club	Season	Division	Apps	Goals	Apps	Goals	Apps	Goals	Apps	Goals	Apps	Goals
Spezia	2021–22	Serie A	1	0	—		—		—		1	0
Spezia	2022–23	Serie A	1	0	1	0	—		0	0	2	0
Spezia	2023–24	Serie B	0	0	0	0	—		—		0	0
Spezia	Total		2	0	1	0	—		0	0	3	0
Lokomotiv Plovdiv	2025–26	First League	3	0	2	0	—		—		5	0
Career total			5	0	3	0	0	0	0	0	8	0
