= Martin Erlić =

Croatian footballer (born 1998)

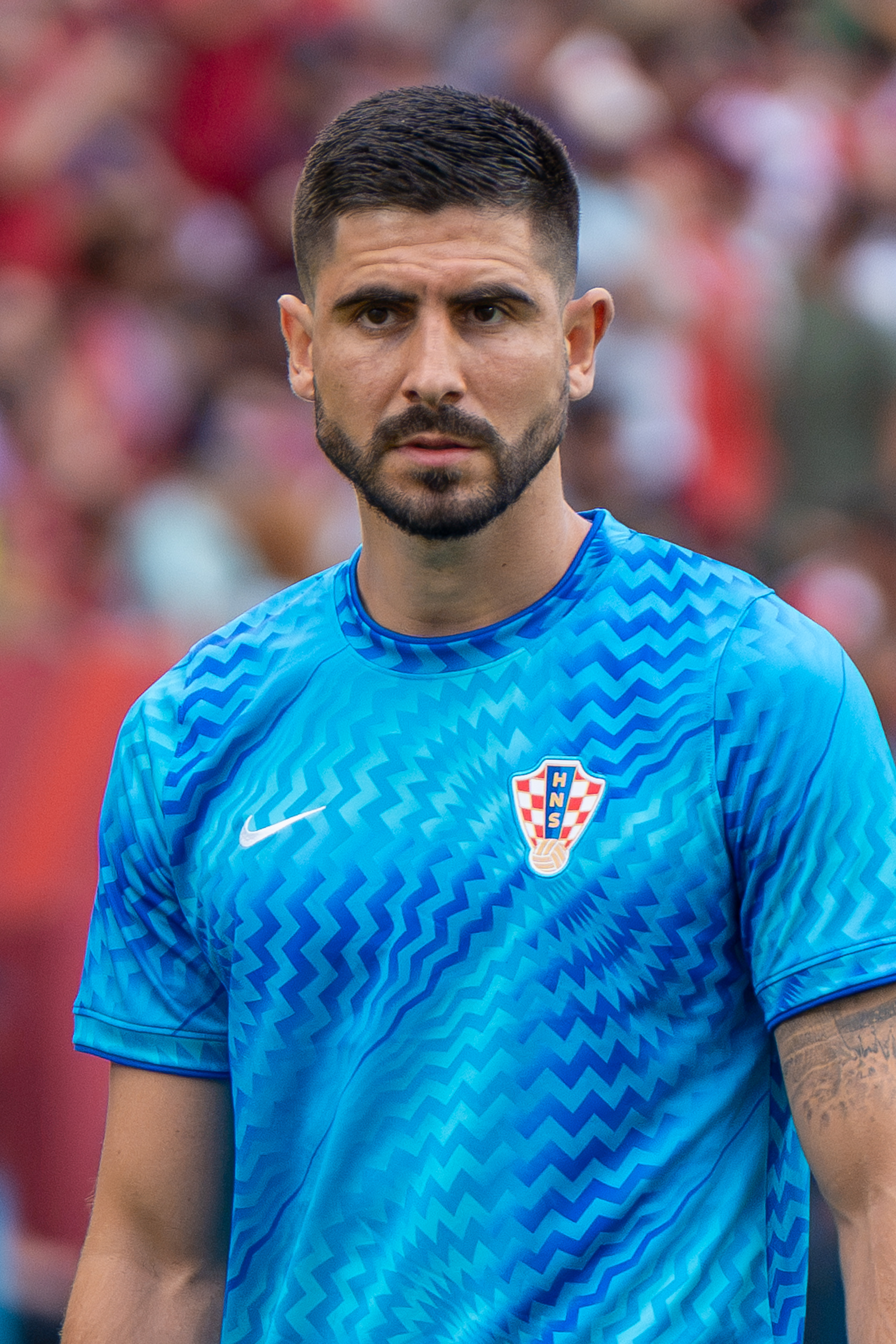
- Erlić with Croatia in 2022

Personal information
- Full name: Martin Erlić
- Date of birth: 24 January 1998 (age 28)
- Place of birth: Zadar, Croatia
- Height: 1.92 m (6 ft 4 in)
- Position: Centre-back

Team information
- Current team: Midtjylland
- Number: 6

Youth career
- 2008-2010: Raštane
- 2010–2012: Dinamo Zagreb
- 2012–2014: Rijeka
- 2014–2015: Parma
- 2015–2017: Sassuolo

Senior career*
Years	Team	Apps	(Gls)
2017–2019	Sassuolo	0	(0)
2017–2018	→ Südtirol (loan)	30	(1)
2018–2019	→ Spezia (loan)	0	(0)
2019–2021	Spezia	50	(3)
2021–2024	Sassuolo	60	(1)
2021–2022	→ Spezia (loan)	30	(2)
2024–2025	Bologna	8	(0)
2025–	Midtjylland	24	(3)

International career^{‡}
2015	Croatia U17	10	(1)
2015	Croatia U18	3	(0)
2016	Croatia U19	11	(0)
2022–	Croatia	13	(1)
Medal record
Men's football
Representing Croatia
FIFA World Cup
Third place	2022 Qatar
UEFA Nations League
Runner-up	2023 Netherlands
- * Club domestic league appearances and goals as of 03:13, 9 September 2026 (UTC) ‡ National team caps and goals as of 23:33, 7 June 2026 (UTC)

Martin Erlić (Croatian pronunciation: [mǎrtin êːrlitɕ]; born 24 January 1998) is a Croatian professional footballer who plays as a centre-back for the Danish club Midtjylland and the Croatia national team.

== Club career ==
=== Early career ===
Hailing from the village of Tinj, Erlić started training football at NK Raštane in a nearby village. At the age of 12, he was scouted by GNK Dinamo Zagreb and spent two years in its youth team before moving onto NK Rijeka. Erlić moved abroad at the age of 16, to Parma. After Parma's bankruptcy, Erlić went to Sassuolo in 2015.

==== Loan to Südtirol ====
On 31 August 2017, Erlić moved to Serie C club Südtirol on a season-long loan deal. On 8 October, he made his Serie C debut for Südtirol, as a substitute replacing Filippo Sgarbi in the 70th minute of a 3–1 away defeat against Padova. On 15 October, Erlić played his first entire match for Südtirol, a 5–0 home victory against Santarcangelo. On 8 November, Erlić scored his first professional goal for Südtirol in the 81st minute of a 1–0 away win over Sambenedettese. Erlić ended his season-long loan to Südtirol with 30 appearances as well as one goal and assist each.

=== Later career ===
On 10 July 2018, Erlić initially was loaned to Serie B club Spezia on a season-long loan deal. After missing most of the 2018–19 season through injury, he rejoined Spezia on a permanent basis on 15 July 2019. Erlić signed for Sassuolo on 16 August 2021, but was returned on loan to Spezia for the 2021–22 season. On 2 August 2024, he signed with Bologna in Serie A.

On 4 August 2025, Erlić signed a five-year contract with Midtjylland in Denmark.

== International career ==
On 6 June 2022, Erlić made his debut for the Croatia national team in a 1–1 draw with France in the Nations League. He stated to attend his brother's wedding to play the match. On 9 November 2022, Erlić was named in Zlatko Dalić's 26-man squad for the 2022 FIFA World Cup, where he remained an unused substitute as Croatia finished third.

On 18 May 2026, Erlić was selected in the 26-man squad for the 2026 FIFA World Cup.

== Personal life ==
Erlić is a fan of Hajduk Split.

== Career statistics ==
=== Club ===
As of match played 10 September 2026

Appearances and goals by club, season and competition
Club	Season	League			National cup (Note: Includes Coppa Italia, Danish Cup)		Europe		Other		Total	
Club	Season	Division	Apps	Goals	Apps	Goals	Apps	Goals	Apps	Goals	Apps	Goals
Südtirol (loan)	2017–18	Serie C	30	1	0	0	—		—		30	1
Spezia (loan)	2018–19	Serie B	0	0	1	0	—		—		1	0
Spezia	2019–20	Serie B	23	0	0	0	—		4 (Note: Appearances in Serie B promotion play-offs)	0	27	0
Spezia	2020–21	Serie A	27	3	1	0	—		—		28	3
Spezia	Total		50	3	1	0	0	0	4	0	55	3
Spezia (loan)	2021–22	Serie A	30	2	2	1	—		—		32	3
Sassuolo	2022–23	Serie A	28	0	0	0	—		—		28	0
Sassuolo	2023–24	Serie A	32	1	1	0	—		—		33	1
Sassuolo	Total		60	1	1	0	0	0	0	0	61	1
Bologna	2024–25	Serie A	8	0	2	0	1 (Note: Appearance in UEFA Champions League)	0	—		11	0
Midtjylland	2025–26	Danish Superliga	18	2	5	0	11 (Note: Appearances in UEFA Europa League)	4	—		34	6
Midtjylland	2026–27	Danish Superliga	6	1	1	0	4 (Note: Two appearances in UEFA Europa League, two appearances in UEFA Conference League)	0	—		11	1
Midtjylland	Total		24	3	6	0	15	4	—		45	7
Career total			202	10	13	1	16	4	4	0	235	15

=== International ===
As of match played 7 June 2026

Appearances and goals by national team and year
National team	Year	Apps	Goals
Croatia	2022	4	0
Croatia	2023	3	0
Croatia	2024	3	0
Croatia	2025	1	1
Croatia	2026	2	0
Total		13	1

Scores and results list Croatia's goal tally first.

List of international goals scored by Kristijan Jakić
No.	Date	Venue	Opponent	Score	Result	Competition
1	12 October 2025	Stadion Varteks, Varaždin, Croatia	Gibraltar	3–0	3–0	2026 FIFA World Cup qualification

== Honours ==
Bologna

- Coppa Italia: 2024–25

Midtjylland

- Danish Cup: 2025–26

Croatia

- FIFA World Cup third place: 2022
- UEFA Nations League runner-up: 2022–23
