= Emanuel Gyasi =

Ghanaian footballer (born 1994)

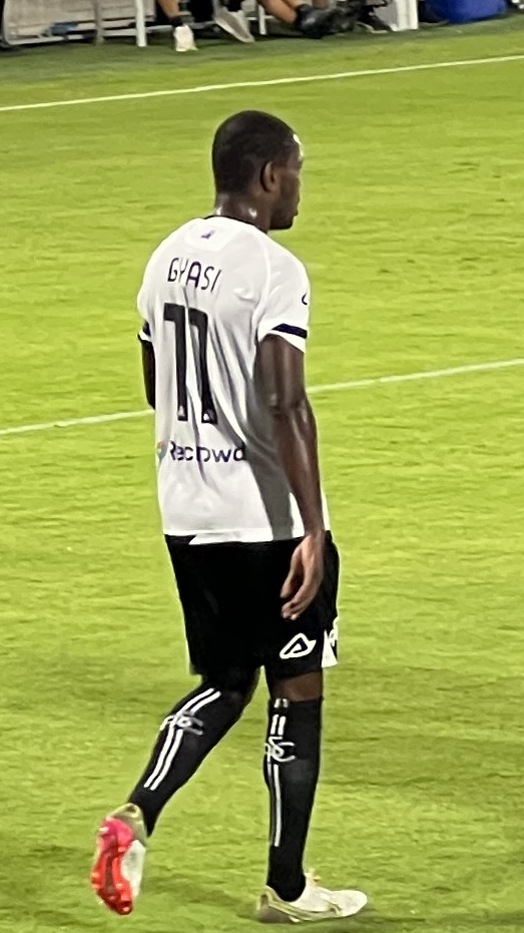
- Gyasi with Spezia in 2022

Personal information
- Full name: Emanuel Quartsin Gyasi
- Date of birth: 11 January 1994 (age 32)
- Place of birth: Palermo, Italy
- Height: 1.81 m (5 ft 11 in)
- Positions: Forward; left winger

Team information
- Current team: Palermo (on loan from Empoli)
- Number: 11

Youth career
- –2011: Pro Vercelli
- 2012–2014: Torino

Senior career*
Years	Team	Apps	(Gls)
2014–2016	Torino	0	(0)
2014–2015	→ Pisa (loan)	2	(0)
2015	→ Mantova (loan)	16	(1)
2015–2016	→ Carrarese (loan)	24	(6)
2016	Pistoiese	0	(0)
2016–2023	Spezia	178	(24)
2016–2017	→ Pistoiese (loan)	36	(5)
2017–2018	→ Südtirol (loan)	37	(4)
2023–	Empoli	70	(3)
2025–	→ Palermo (loan)	22	(0)

International career
2021–	Ghana	3	(0)
- * Club domestic league appearances and goals as of 12 May 2026

Emanuel Quartsin Gyasi (born 11 January 1994) is a professional footballer and plays as a forward or left winger for Serie B club Palermo, on loan from Empoli. Born in Italy, he plays for the Ghana national team.

== Club career ==
A Torino youth product, Gyasi made his Serie C debut for Pisa on 17 September 2014 in a game against Savona.

After a number of years spent on loan to minor league teams, Gyasi signed for Spezia in 2018. With the Ligurian club, Gyasi won promotion to Serie A in 2020 and made his top-flight debut later that year. In 2023, he signed for Empoli.

After two years with Empoli in Serie A, in July 2025 he signed for Serie B club Palermo on a loan deal with a conditional obligation to buy.

== International career ==
Gyasi debuted for the Ghana national team in a 1–1 2021 Africa Cup of Nations qualification tie with South Africa on 25 March 2021.

== Personal life ==
Gyasi was born in Palermo to Ghanaian parents, living in the Sicilian capital until the age of four. After moving back to Ghana, he returned in Italy with his family at the age of 11, settling down in Pino Torinese. He became an Italian citizen in 2017.

== Career statistics ==
=== Club ===
As of match played 25 May 2025

Appearances and goals by club, season and competition
Club	Season	League			National Cup (Note: Includes Coppa Italia, Coppa Italia Serie C)		Europe		Other		Total	
Club	Season	Division	Apps	Goals	Apps	Goals	Apps	Goals	Apps	Goals	Apps	Goals
Pisa (loan)	2014–15	Lega Pro	2	0	1	0	—		—		3	0
Mantova (loan)	2014–15	Lega Pro	16	1	0	0	—		—		16	1
Carrarese (loan)	2015–16	Lega Pro	24	5	0	0	—		—		24	5
Pistoiese (loan)	2016–17	Lega Pro	36	5	2	0	—		—		38	5
Südtirol (loan)	2017–18	Serie C	34	4	1	0	—		2 (Note: Appearance(s) in Serie C play-off)	0	37	4
Spezia	2018–19	Serie B	31	3	2	0	—		1 (Note: Appearance(s) in Serie B play-off)	0	34	3
Spezia	2019–20	Serie B	33	8	2	1	—		4	1	39	10
Spezia	2020–21	Serie A	37	4	2	1	—		—		39	5
Spezia	2021–22	Serie A	36	6	1	0	—		—		37	6
Spezia	2022–23	Serie A	35	2	1	0	—		—		36	2
Spezia	Total		172	23	8	2	—		5	1	185	26
Empoli	2023–24	Serie A	33	1	1	0	—		—		34	1
Empoli	2024–25	Serie A	37	2	6	0	—		—		43	2
Empoli	Total		70	3	7	0	—		—		77	3
Career total			354	41	19	2	—		7	1	380	44
