= Claudio Terzi =

Italian footballer (born 1984)

Personal information
- Full name: Claudio Terzi
- Date of birth: 19 June 1984 (age 42)
- Place of birth: Milan, Italy
- Height: 1.82 m (6 ft 0 in)
- Position: Centre-back

Youth career
- Bologna

Senior career*
Years	Team	Apps	(Gls)
2002–2009	Bologna	125	(3)
2004–2005	→ Napoli (loan)	15	(1)
2009–2013	Siena	100	(5)
2013–2015	Palermo	46	(0)
2015–2021	Spezia	194	(5)
2021–2022	Siena	30	(1)
Total		510	(15)
- * Club domestic league appearances and goals

Claudio Terzi (born 19 June 1984) is an Italian former professional footballer who played as a centre-back.

== Career ==
His first match in Serie A came against Modena in 2002. Bologna won the match 3–0.

Having not played in Bologna's first game of the season at Coppa Italia, he swapped clubs with Daniele Portanova on 19 August 2009, four days before the start of Serie A. Terzi was valued €2.5 million.

In May 2010, he was borrowed by A.C. Milan for end season friendly tour to North America.

On 19 July 2013, Terzi moved to Palermo, with whom he signed a contract for four years.

On 25 August 2021, he returned to Siena, now in Serie C.

== Italian football scandal ==
On 11 August 2012, he was suspended for three years and a half due to 2011 Italian football scandal.

Terzi and colleague Filippo De Col were involved in a WhatsApp match-fixing scandal along with Emanuele Calaiò at the end of the 2017–18 season.

== Career statistics ==
=== Club ===
As of match played 27 March 2022

Appearances and goals by club, season and competition
Club	Season	League			National Cup		Other		Total	
Club	Season	Division	Apps	Goals	Apps	Goals	Apps	Goals	Apps	Goals
Bologna	2002–03	Serie A	3	0	1	0	—		4	0
Bologna	2003–04	Serie A	6	0	3	0	—		9	0
Bologna	2004–05	Serie A	0	0	1	0	—		1	0
Bologna	2005–06	Serie A	16	0	1	0	—		17	0
Bologna	2006–07	Serie A	35	0	3	0	—		38	0
Bologna	2007–08	Serie A	33	1	1	0	—		34	1
Bologna	2008–09	Serie A	32	2	2	0	—		34	2
Bologna	Total		125	3	12	0	0	0	137	3
Napoli (loan)	2004–05	Serie C1	15	1	0	0	—		15	1
Siena	2009–10	Serie A	19	1	2	0	—		21	1
Siena	2010–11	Serie B	38	2	1	0	—		39	2
Siena	2011–12	Serie A	35	1	3	0	—		38	1
Siena	2012–13	Serie A	8	1	0	0	—		8	1
Siena	Total		100	5	6	0	0	0	106	5
Palermo	2013–14	Serie B	31	0	2	0	—		33	0
Palermo	2014–15	Serie A	15	0	0	0	—		15	0
Palermo	Total		46	0	2	0	0	0	48	0
Spezia	2015–16	Serie B	37	1	4	0	3 (Note: Appearance(s) in Promotion Playoffs)	0	44	1
Spezia	2016–17	Serie B	38	0	3	0	1	0	42	0
Spezia	2017–18	Serie B	34	3	2	0	—		36	3
Spezia	2018–19	Serie B	31	0	2	0	1	0	34	0
Spezia	2019–20	Serie B	29	0	2	0	4	0	35	0
Spezia	2020–21	Serie A	25	1	2	0	—		27	1
Spezia	Total		194	5	15	0	9	0	218	5
Siena	2021–22	Serie C	27	1	—		—		27	1
Career total			507	15	35	0	9	0	551	15

== Honours ==
Palermo

- Serie B: 2013–14
