= Giulio Maggiore =

Italian footballer (born 1998)

Personal information
- Date of birth: 12 March 1998 (age 28)
- Place of birth: Genoa, Italy
- Height: 1.87 m (6 ft 2 in)
- Position: Defensive midfielder

Team information
- Current team: Bari
- Number: 18

Youth career
- 2010–2012: Spezia
- 2012: AC Milan
- 2012–2016: Spezia

Senior career*
Years	Team	Apps	(Gls)
2016–2022	Spezia	182	(16)
2022–2025	Salernitana	55	(4)
2025	→ Bari (loan)	13	(3)
2025–	Bari	27	(3)

International career^{‡}
2016	Italy U18	1	(0)
2017	Italy U19	4	(1)
2017–2018	Italy U20	6	(0)
2019–2021	Italy U21	8	(1)
- * Club domestic league appearances and goals as of 12 May 2026 ‡ National team caps and goals as of 31 May 2021

Giulio Maggiore (born 12 March 1998) is an Italian professional footballer who plays as a defensive midfielder for Serie C Group C club Bari.

== Club career ==
Maggiore made his professional debut in the Serie B for Spezia on 20 September 2016 in a game against Trapani.

After helping Spezia achieve promotion in the 2019–20 Serie B season, Maggiore made his Serie A debut in a 4–1 debut against Sassuolo on 27 September 2020. At the end of the season, after the team had survived in their first top-flight season and the departure of Claudio Terzi, Maggiore was promoted to the status of club captain.

On 16 August 2022, Maggiore moved to Salernitana on a four-year contract.

On 3 February 2025, Maggiore joined Bari on loan, with an option to buy and a conditional obligation to buy.

On 1 September 2025, Maggiore returned to Bari on a permanent basis and signed a three-year contract.

== International career ==
Maggiore was included in the Italy under-21 squad for the 2021 UEFA European Under-21 Championship.

== Career statistics ==
As of match played 11 April 2025

Appearances and goals by club, season and competition
Club	Season	League	League		Coppa Italia		Total	
Club	Season	League	Apps	Goals	Apps	Goals	Apps	Goals
Spezia	2016–17	Serie B	27	1	1	0	28	1
Spezia	2017–18	Serie B	30	3	0	0	30	3
Spezia	2018–19	Serie B	23	5	0	0	23	5
Spezia	2019–20	Serie B	34	2	2	0	36	2
Spezia	2020–21	Serie A	33	3	2	2	35	5
Spezia	2021–22	Serie A	35	2	1	0	36	2
Spezia	Total		182	16	7	2	188	18
Salernitana	2022–23	Serie A	16	0	0	0	16	0
Salernitana	2023–24	Serie A	27	4	3	0	30	4
Salernitana	2024–25	Serie B	12	0	2	0	14	0
Salernitana	Total		55	4	5	0	60	4
Bari	2024–25	Serie B	8	3	0	0	8	3
Career total			245	23	12	2	257	25
