= Lorenzo Colombini =

Italian football player

Personal information
- Date of birth: 17 January 2001 (age 25)
- Place of birth: Milan, Italy
- Height: 1.81 m (5 ft 11 in)
- Position: Defender

Youth career
- Inter

Senior career*
Years	Team	Apps	(Gls)
2020–2023	Spezia	0	(0)
2020–2021	→ Novara (loan)	11	(0)
2021–2022	→ Giana Erminio (loan)	27	(0)
2022–2023	→ Renate (loan)	15	(0)
2023–2026	Sorrento	65	(1)

International career^{‡}
2016	Italy U15	4	(0)
2018–2019	Italy U18	4	(0)
2019	Italy U19	3	(0)
- * Club domestic league appearances and goals as of 1 May 2026 ‡ National team caps and goals as of 19 November 2019

Lorenzo Colombini (born 17 January 2001) is an Italian professional footballer who plays as a defender.

== Club career ==
He was raised in the youth teams of Inter and represented the club in the 2018–19 UEFA Youth League and 2019–20 UEFA Youth League.

In the summer of 2020, he joined Spezia. On 22 September 2020, he was loaned to Serie C club Novara.

He made his professional Serie C debut for Novara on 13 December 2020 in a game against Pergolettese. He made his first start on 7 March 2021 against Lecco.

On 26 August 2021, he was loaned to Serie C club Giana Erminio.

On 1 August 2022, Colombini moved on loan to Renate.

On 31 August 2023, Colombini signed with Sorrento.

== International career ==
He was first called up to represent his country in 2016 for the Under-15 squad friendlies. In 2019, he played in the UEFA Under-19 qualifiers, the final tournament was eventually cancelled due to the COVID-19 pandemic in Europe.
