= Gennaro Acampora =

Italian professional footballer

Personal information
- Date of birth: 29 March 1994 (age 32)
- Place of birth: Naples, Italy
- Height: 1.77 m (5 ft 10 in)
- Position: Midfielder

Team information
- Current team: Ascoli

Youth career
- –2010: Napoli
- 2010–2014: Spezia

Senior career*
Years	Team	Apps	(Gls)
2014–2021	Spezia	75	(4)
2016–2017	→ Perugia (loan)	34	(1)
2018	→ Virtus Entella (loan)	17	(0)
2021–2026	Benevento	94	(9)
2023–2024	→ Bari (loan)	20	(0)
2026	Pescara	12	(1)
2026–	Ascoli	0	(0)

International career
2014–2015	Italy U-20	5	(0)
- * Club domestic league appearances and goals as of 13 May 2026

Gennaro Acampora (born 29 March 1994) is an Italian professional footballer who plays as a midfielder for Serie B club Ascoli.

== Club career ==
Acampora made his professional debut in the Serie B for Spezia on 11 October 2014 in a game against Pro Vercelli.

On 6 August 2021, he signed with Benevento.

On 1 September 2023, Acampora joined Bari on loan with an option to buy.

On 2 February 2026, Acampora moved to Pescara in Serie B.

== Personal life ==
On 1 January 2021, he tested positive for COVID-19.
