= Paolo Bartolomei =

Italian football player

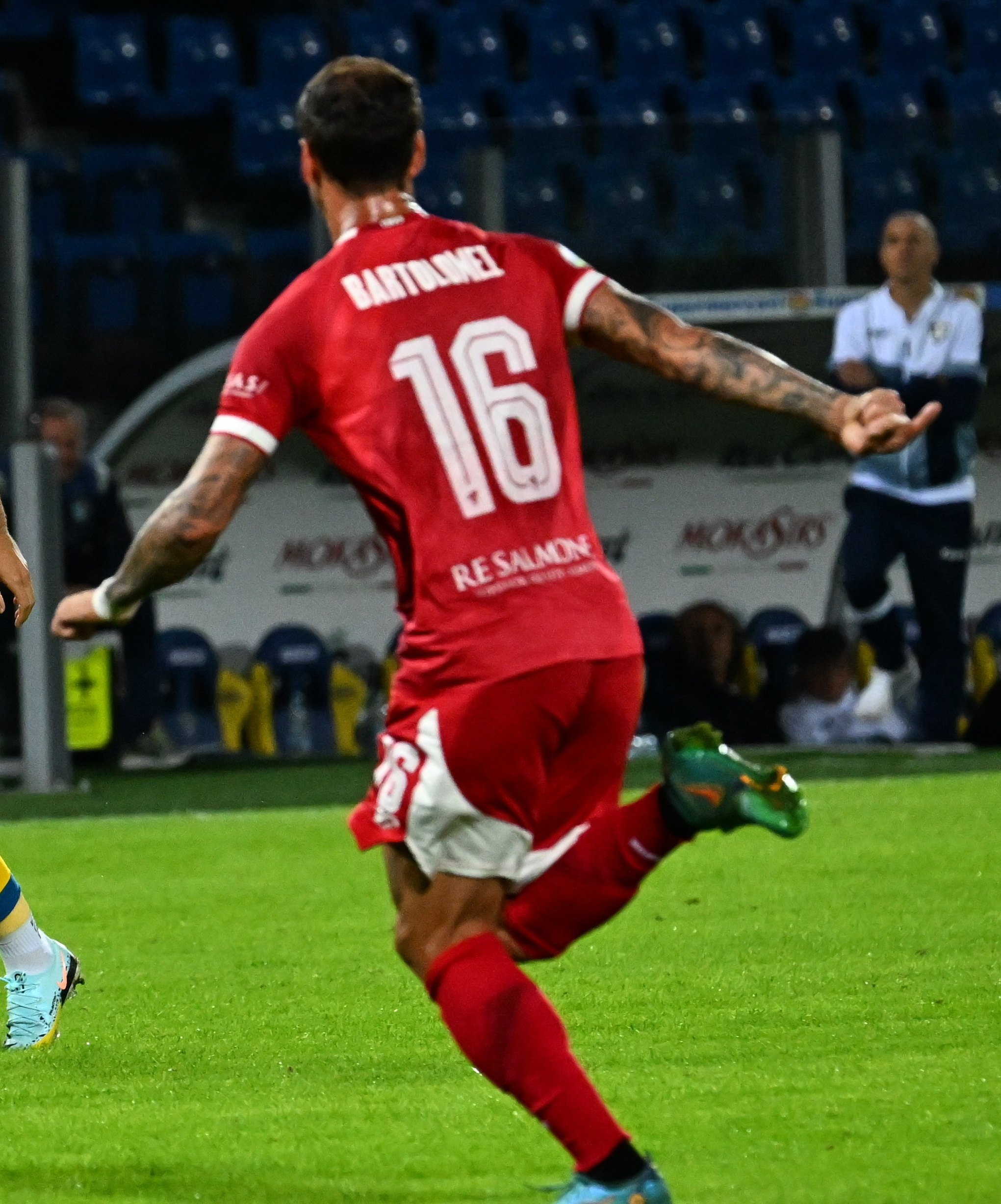
- Bartolomei playing for Perugia in 2022

Personal information
- Date of birth: 21 August 1989 (age 37)
- Place of birth: Lucca, Italy
- Height: 1.83 m (6 ft 0 in)
- Position: Midfielder

Team information
- Current team: Perugia
- Number: 16

Youth career
- Valle di Ottavo
- Prato

Senior career*
Years	Team	Apps	(Gls)
2006–2009	Castelnuovo		
2009–2013	Massese		
2013–2015	Pontedera	62	(4)
2015	Teramo		
2015–2016	Reggiana	20	(0)
2016–2018	Cittadella	68	(6)
2018–2021	Spezia	78	(6)
2021–2022	Cremonese	36	(0)
2022–	Perugia	100	(1)
- * Club domestic league appearances and goals as of 30 April 2026

Paolo Bartolomei (born 21 August 1989) is an Italian professional footballer who plays as a midfielder for Serie C Group B club Perugia.

== Club career ==
He made his professional debut in the Lega Pro for Pontedera on 1 September 2013 in a game against Grosseto.

On 13 July 2018 he joined Serie B club Spezia.

On 11 January 2021 he moved to Cremonese.

On 1 September 2022, Bartolomei signed a two-year contract with Perugia.
