= Juan Manuel Ramos =

Uruguayan footballer (born 1996)

Juan Ramos
Personal information
- Full name: Juan Manuel Ramos Pintos
- Date of birth: 1 September 1996 (age 30)
- Place of birth: Durazno, Uruguay
- Height: 1.79 m (5 ft 10 in)
- Position: Left-back

Team information
- Current team: Boston River
- Number: 21

Youth career
- 2013–2014: Montevideo Wanderers

Senior career*
Years	Team	Apps	(Gls)
2014–2016	Catania	1	(0)
2016–2017	Casertana	36	(1)
2017–2019	Parma	0	(0)
2018	→ Cosenza (loan)	10	(0)
2018–2019	→ Trapani (loan)	19	(1)
2019–2021	Spezia	24	(0)
2021–2023	Peñarol	44	(4)
2024–	Boston River	11	(2)
- * Club domestic league appearances and goals as of 8 September 2024

Juan Manuel Ramos Pintos (born 1 September 1996) is a Uruguayan professional footballer who plays as a defender for Uruguayan Primera División side Boston River.

== Club career ==
=== Catania ===
Born in Montevideo, Ramos joined Sicilian club Catania in January 2014 from Uruguayan side Montevideo Wanderers. He made his league debut for the Rossazzurri on 24 December 2014 against Cittadella in a 3–2 away defeat. He was handed the number 33 shirt for his first season with Catania. Ramos made his second ever appearance in a Catania shirt, when he replaced Andrea De Rossi in the 77th minute of Catania's 3–0 victory over SPAL in round two of the Coppa Italia. SPAL were leading by a single goal scored by ex-Milan player Gianmarco Zigoni with the match being decided by the Football Association. He enjoyed a fruitful 2014–15 season with the Catania Primavera side, managing a total of 16 appearances as Catania finished in 6th place narrowly missing out on the play-offs spot by goal difference behind Empoli's Primavera side. In the 2015–16 close season, Ramos departed the Elefanti, having spent two seasons with the club.

=== Casertana ===
On 27 July 2016, he along with fellow new signings Filippo Lorenzini and Lorenzo Colli were unveiled as Casertana players. Though he did not play, on 31 July, Ramos appeared as an unused substitute for Casertana in their 3–2 home win over Tuttocuoio in the 2016–17 Coppa Italia. He scored his first league goal in a 2–1 away victory against Cosenza on 6 November 2016.

=== Parma ===
On 7 July 2017, Ramos joined Parma on a permanent deal from Casertana. He signed a three-year contract with the club.

==== Loan to Cosenza ====
Having failed to make a single appearance for Parma, on 30 January 2018, Ramos joined Cosenza on a short-term loan. He managed a total of 10 appearances, before returning to his parent club.

==== Loan to Trapani ====
Following his loan spell with Cosenza, Ramos was not viewed as a part of Parma's plans for their top-flight return, and was sent out on loan to another Serie C side, this time to Trapani for the 2018–19 season. On 18 August 2018, he made his league debut for the Sicilian club on the opening day of the season, starting in a 3–0 home win against Reggina at the Stadio Polisportivo Provinciale. Ramos was again included in Trapani's starting lineup for Gameweek 2's away fixture against Vibonese. Trapani won the match by two goals to nil. He also started the third game against Sicula Leonzio. Ramos marked his fourth appearance for the side with a goal against Siracusa to help his team to a 2–1 victory and make it four league wins from four games for Trapani.

=== Spezia ===
On 4 July 2019, Ramos signed for Serie B club Spezia Calcio.

== Personal life ==
On 21 March 2021, he tested positive for COVID-19.
