= Stadio Alberto Picco =

Football stadium in La Spezia, Italy

Coordinates: 44°06′08″N 9°48′31″E

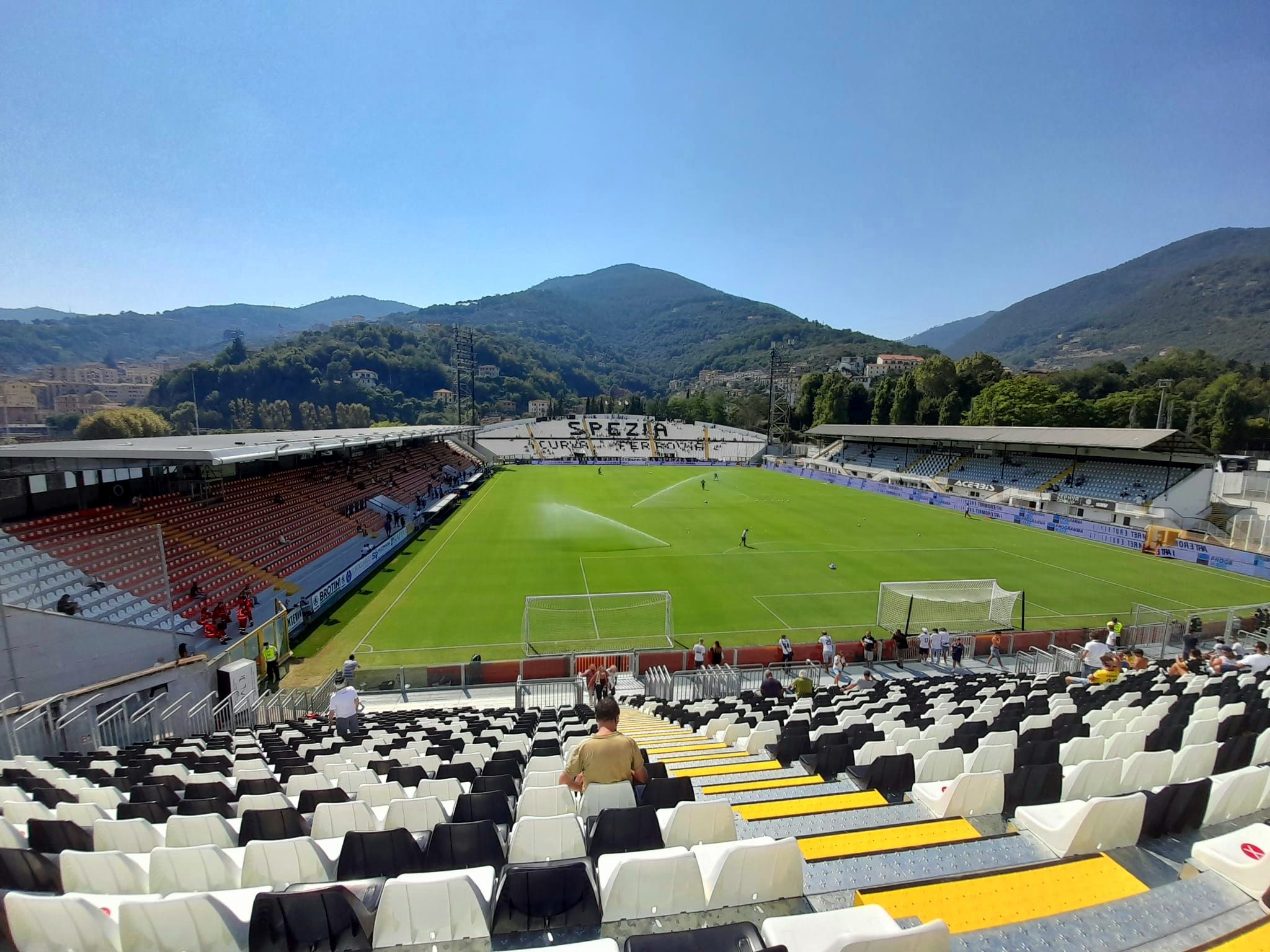
- Alberto Picco Stadium La Spezia
- Interactive map of Stadio Alberto Picco
- Location: La Spezia, Italy
- Owner: Municipality of La Spezia
- Capacity: 11,466
- Surface: Grass; 105x65m

Construction
- Opened: 1919
- Architects: Gregotti and associates

Tenant
- Spezia Calcio 1906

Stadio Alberto Picco is the main football stadium in La Spezia, Italy. Since 1919, it has been the home ground of Spezia Calcio. The stadium holds 11,466. It was named after Alberto Picco who scored the club's first ever goal, before tragically dying during World War I.

== Gallery ==
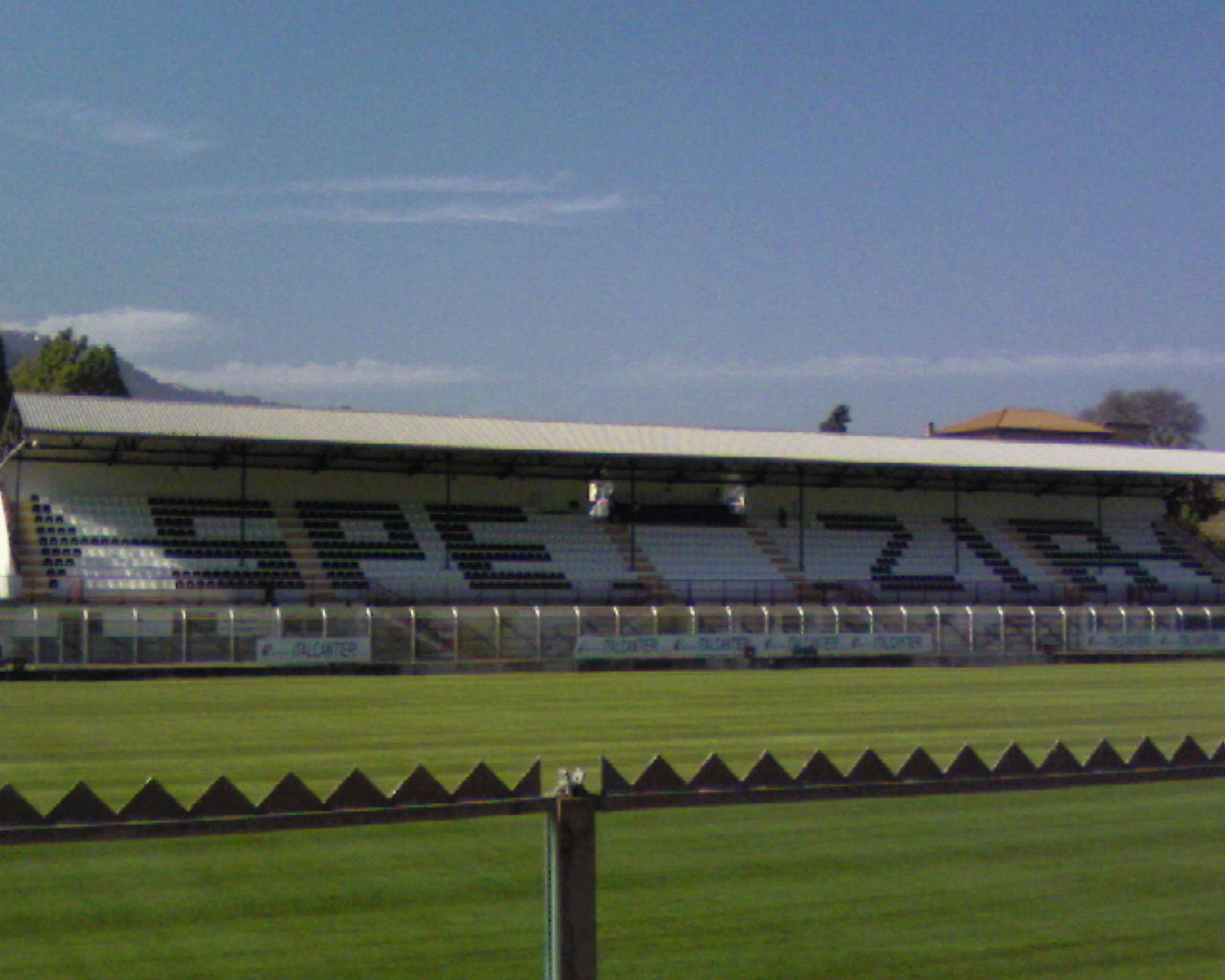
Tribuna

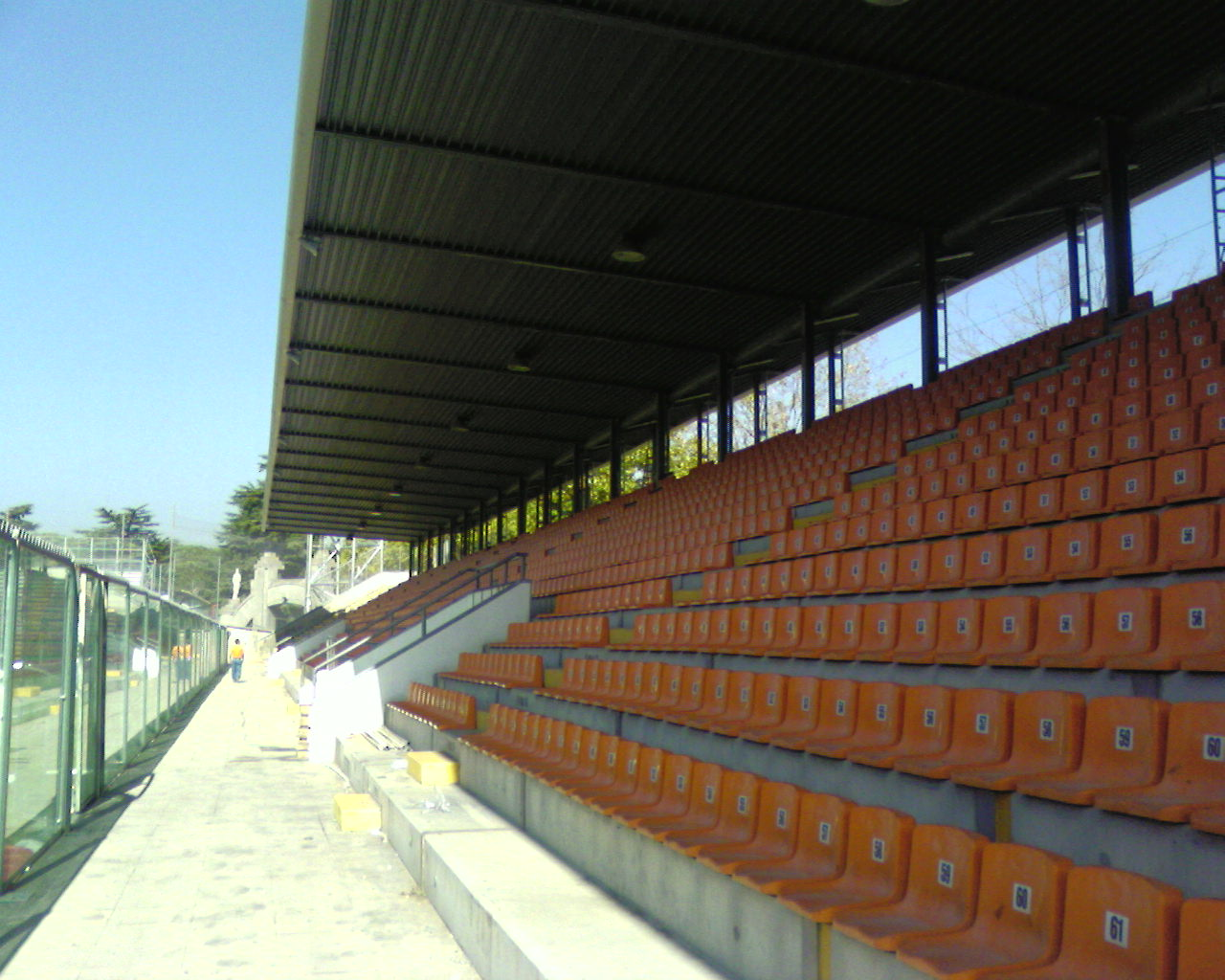
Distinti

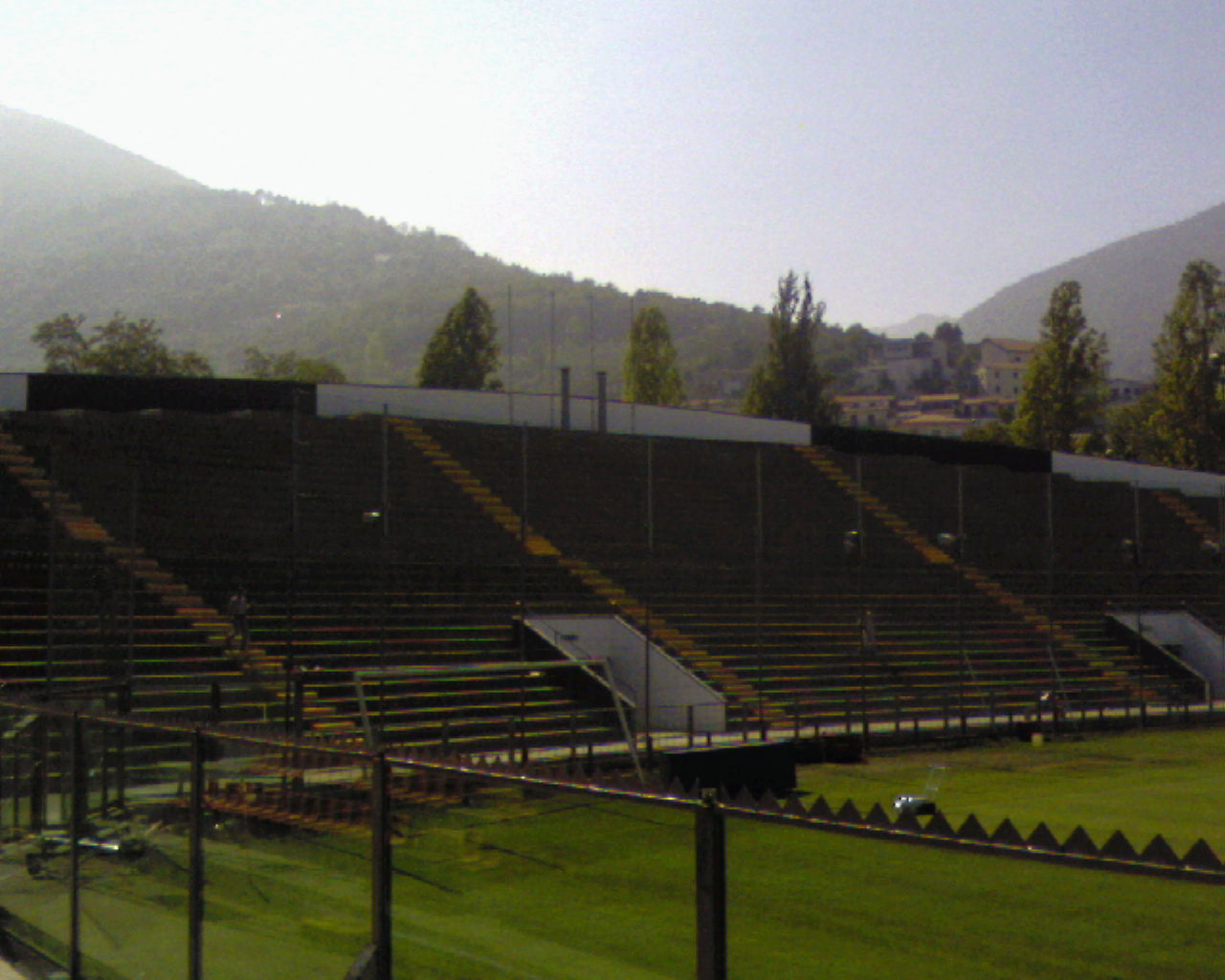
Curva Ferrovia

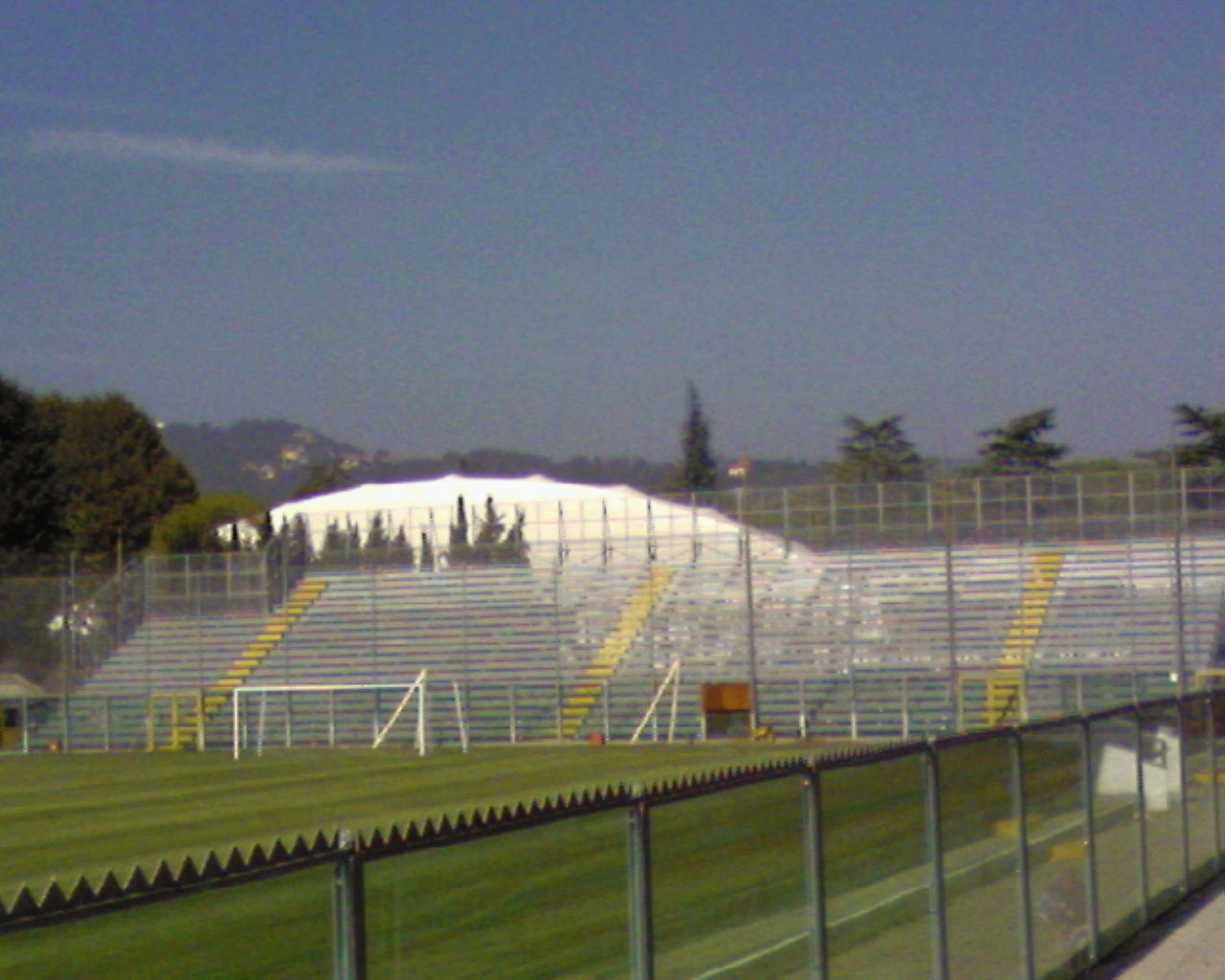
Curva Piscina

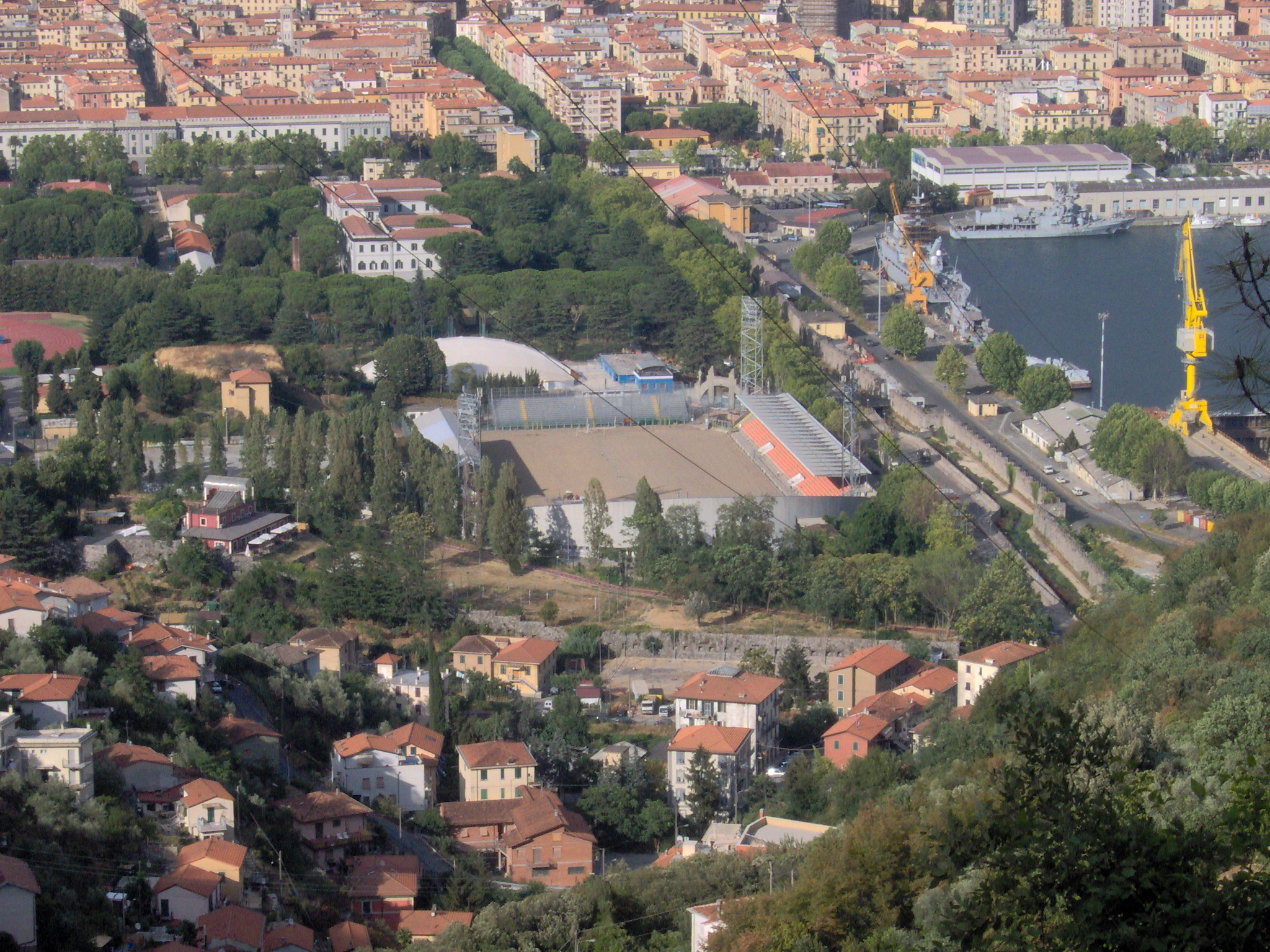
Overview
- Image from Google Maps
