= Luca Vignali =

Italian footballer

Personal information
- Date of birth: 11 January 1996 (age 30)
- Place of birth: La Spezia, Italy
- Height: 1.83 m (6 ft 0 in)
- Position: Midfielder

Team information
- Current team: Virtus Entella
- Number: 8

Youth career
- –2016: Spezia

Senior career*
Years	Team	Apps	(Gls)
2015–2022	Spezia	124	(1)
2018	→ Reggiana (loan)	18	(0)
2021–2022	→ Como (loan)	32	(3)
2022–2024	Como	38	(2)
2024	→ Spezia (loan)	17	(1)
2024–2026	Spezia	58	(6)
2026–	Virtus Entella	1	(0)
- * Club domestic league appearances and goals as of 29 August 2026

Luca Vignali (born 11 January 1996) is an Italian professional footballer who plays as a midfielder for Serie B club Virtus Entella. A versatile midfielder, Vignali is capable of playing both centrally and in wide positions.

== Early career ==
Vignali was born in the Liguria town of La Spezia, and began his career in the local Serie B side Spezia Calcio at the age of six. He progressed through the youth teams of the Aquilotti, eventually becoming a mainstay in the main Primavera side and going on to make over 50 appearances in a variety of midfield roles, scoring 10 goals. He was part of the side that managed to finished third in the 2014–15 Campionato Primavera, and reached the quarter-finals of the subsequent Fase Finale ('Final Eight' knockout tournament) before being eliminated by Roma.

== First-team ==
Vignali was named on the Spezia first-team bench for the Coppa Italia game against Brescia on 8 August 2015. His first appearance for the first-team was as a last minute substitution in the 2–1 Coppa Italia loss to Alessandria. In Serie B, Vignali's first appearance came in a 3–1 win over Salernitana. He played 86 minutes, registering both his first professional goal and first professional assist, as the team recorded a 3–1 victory. He became increasingly involved as the 2015–16 season progressed, and was rewarded with his first professional contract in June 2016, lasting three years. He began the 2016–17 season playing fairly regularly under manager Domenico di Carlo.

On 19 August 2022, Vignali signed a three-year contract with Como.

On 9 January 2024, Vignali returned to Spezia on loan until the end of the season, with Spezia holding an obligation to make the transfer permanent if they avoided relegation to Serie C.
