= Dimitrios Nikolaou =

Greek footballer

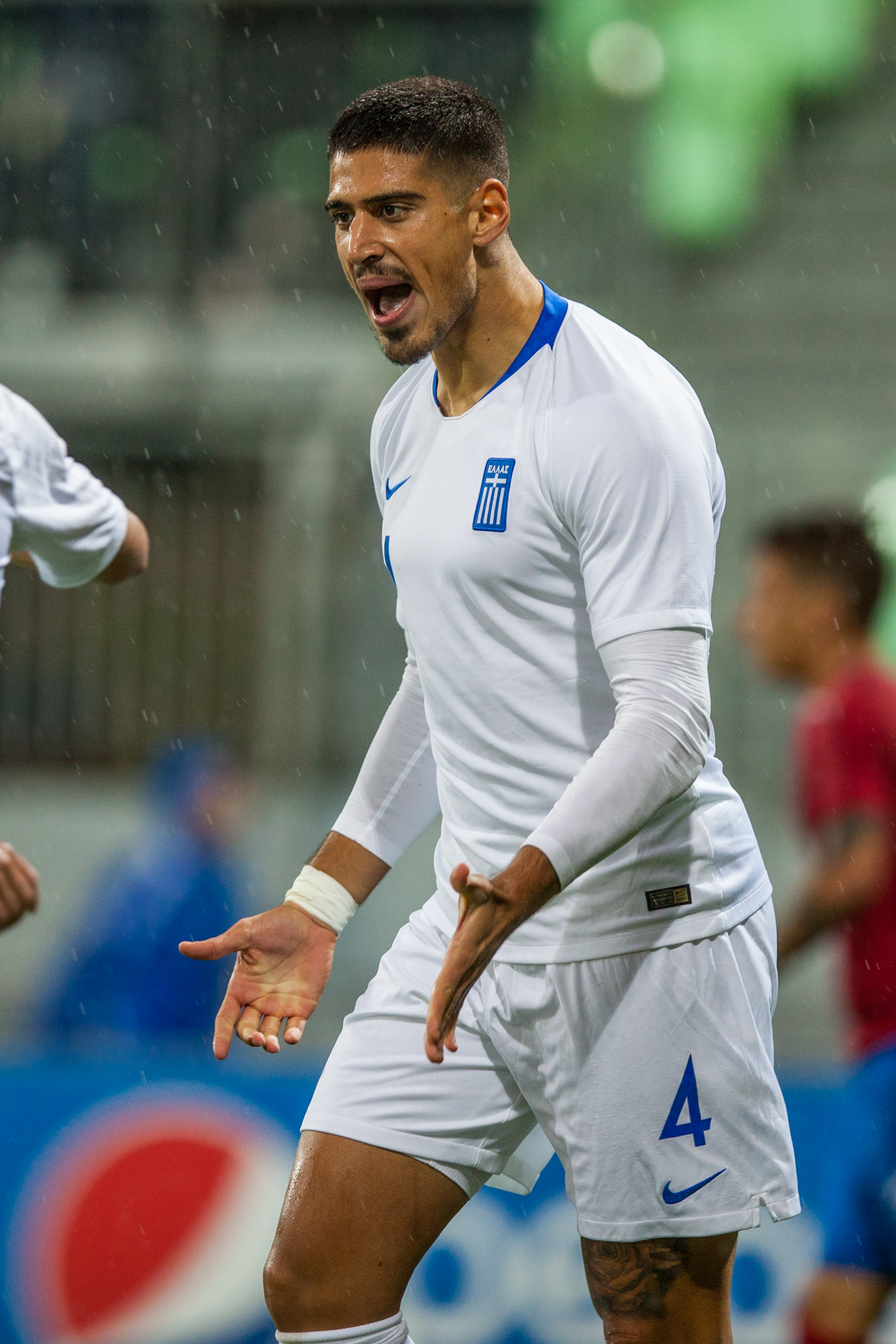
- Nikolaou with Greece in 2019

Personal information
- Full name: Dimitrios Nikolaou
- Date of birth: 13 August 1998 (age 28)
- Place of birth: Chalkida, Euboea, Greece
- Height: 1.88 m (6 ft 2 in)
- Position: Centre-back

Team information
- Current team: OFI (on loan from Palermo)
- Number: 43

Youth career
- 2007–2016: Olympiacos

Senior career*
Years	Team	Apps	(Gls)
2016–2019	Olympiacos	11	(0)
2019	→ Empoli (loan)	4	(0)
2019–2021	Empoli	45	(0)
2021–2024	Spezia	107	(1)
2024–	Palermo	29	(1)
2025–2026	→ Bari (loan)	23	(0)
2026–	→ OFI (loan)	4	(0)

International career^{‡}
2013–2014	Greece U16	2	(0)
2014–2015	Greece U17	13	(0)
2015–2017	Greece U19	13	(1)
2017–2020	Greece U21	21	(1)
2018	Greece	1	(0)
- * Club domestic league appearances and goals as of 12 September 2026 ‡ National team caps and goals as of 13 October 2020

Dimitrios Nikolaou (Greek: Δημήτριος Νικολάου; born 13 August 1998) is a Greek professional footballer who plays as a centre-back for Super League Greece club OFI, on loan from Serie B club Palermo.

== Club career ==
=== Olympiacos ===
On 29 January 2017, Nikolaou made his debut with the club in a 2–1 away Super League win against Veria. A month later, he scored his first goal in a 2–0 Greek Cup win game against Aris.

On 18 October 2017, Nikolaou scored an own goal and headed goal for his team in a 3–1 away loss in the 2017–18 UEFA Champions League group stage against Barcelona.

==== Loan to Empoli ====
On 28 January 2019, the 20-year-old Dimitris Nikolaou departed Piraeus, signing for Serie A club Empoli on loan for the remainder of the 2018–19 season, with a purchase option at the range of €3.5 million. This season, Nikolaou has largely been sitting on the sidelines with Olympiacos, only participating in one Greek Football Cup match. The young defender is regarded as a prospect for the future and will hope to receive regular playing time with Empoli. On 15 April 2019, he made his debut with the club in a 0–0 away draw game against Atalanta.

=== Empoli ===
On 2 June 2019, Empoli activated the option of the 20-year-old international defender, who reportedly was worth €3.5 million. Nikolaou played in four games at Campionato, and the leaders of the Italian club decided to activate the option of the young Greek defender despite their relegation. Nikolaou signed for four years for an undisclosed fee. The announcement from the Italian club stated: "Empoli announces that he has exercised the right to buy, and signed the young international Dimitris Nikolaou from Olympiacos."

=== Spezia ===
Since the end of the 2020–21 season, it was obvious that Dimitris Nikolaou's performances with the Empoli jersey, leading it to the Serie B title and the promotion to Serie A, would hardly keep the 23-year-old central defender in the Azzurri, especially since he was in the last year of his contract. His coach, Alessio Dionisi, wanted him in Sassuolo since he became head coach at the beginning of summer 2021, while at the same time, the technical director who brought him to Empoli, Riccardo Pecini, wanted him in his own new team Spezia Calcio, with which he will sign a five-year contract and will increase more than double his current earnings. On 13 August 2021, he scored his first goal with the club in a Coppa Italia away 3–1 win game against Pordenone Calcio.

=== Palermo and loan to Bari ===
On 14 July 2024, Serie B club Palermo announced the signing of Nikolaou from Spezia on a four-year contract, with the player reuniting with his former coach Alessio Dionisi.

After a lacklustre season with the Rosanero, on 18 July 2025, he was loaned out to fellow Serie B club Bari.

== Career statistics ==
As of 1 May 2024 (UTC).

Club performance			League		Cup		Continental		Total	
Season	Club	League	Apps	Goals	Apps	Goals	Apps	Goals	Apps	Goals
Greece			League		Greek Cup		Europe		Total	
2016–17	Olympiacos	Super League Greece	2	0	4	1	0	0	6	1
2017–18	Olympiacos	Super League Greece	9	1	7	0	3	1	19	2
2017–18	Total		11	1	11	1	3	1	25	3
Italy			League		Coppa Italia		Europe		Total	
2018–19	Empoli	Serie A	4	0	0	0	0	0	4	0
2019–20	Empoli	Serie B	16	0	3	0	0	0	19	0
2020–21	Empoli	Serie B	29	0	0	0	0	0	29	0
2020–21	Total		49	0	3	0	0	0	52	0
2021–22	Spezia	Serie A	36	0	1	1	0	0	37	1
2022–23	Spezia	Serie A	37	1	2	0	0	0	39	1
2023–24	Spezia	Serie B	33	0	2	0	0	0	35	0
2023–24	Total		106	1	5	1	0	0	111	2
Career Total			166	2	19	2	3	1	188	5

== Honours ==
=== Club ===
Empoli

- Serie B: 2020–21

Olympiacos

- Super League Greece: 2016–17

OFI

- Greek Super Cup: 2026
