= 2022–23 Spezia Calcio season =

Spezia Calcio
2022–23 season
- Owner: Robert Platek
- Chairman: Philip Raymond Platek Jr.
- Manager: Luca Gotti (until 15 February); Fabrizio Lorieri (caretaker, from 15 February to 23 February); Leonardo Semplici (from 23 February)
- Stadium: Stadio Alberto Picco
- Serie A: 18th (relegated)
- Coppa Italia: Round of 16
- Top goalscorer: League: M'Bala Nzola (13); All: M'Bala Nzola (15)
Home colours	Away colours	Third colours

The 2022–23 season was the 116th season in the history of Spezia Calcio and their third consecutive season in the top flight. The club participated in Serie A and the Coppa Italia.

== Season overview ==
On 1 July 2022, Spezia announced Luca Gotti as their new head coach on a two-year contract, replacing Thiago Motta.

== Players ==
=== First-team squad ===
As of 31 January 2023

Note: Flags indicate national team as defined under FIFA eligibility rules; some limited exceptions apply. Players may hold more than one non-FIFA nationality.

No.	Pos.	Nation	Player
1	GK	NED	Jeroen Zoet
2	DF	SWE	Emil Holm
4	DF	WAL	Ethan Ampadu (on loan from Chelsea)
5	DF	POR	João Moutinho
6	MF	MAR	Mehdi Bourabia
7	MF	ITA	Jacopo Sala
8	MF	SWE	Albin Ekdal
10	FW	ITA	Daniele Verde
11	FW	GHA	Emmanuel Gyasi (captain)
13	DF	POL	Arkadiusz Reca
14	FW	UZB	Eldor Shomurodov (on loan from Roma)
16	MF	DEN	Julius Beck
18	FW	ANG	M'Bala Nzola
19	FW	LAT	Raimonds Krollis
20	DF	ITA	Simone Bastoni

No.	Pos.	Nation	Player
21	DF	ESP	Salva Ferrer
22	GK	ITA	Federico Marchetti
24	MF	UKR	Viktor Kovalenko (on loan from Atalanta)
25	MF	ITA	Salvatore Esposito (on loan from SPAL)
27	DF	FRA	Kelvin Amian
29	DF	ITA	Mattia Caldara (on loan from Milan)
30	MF	ITA	Daniel Maldini (on loan from Milan)
33	MF	COL	Kevin Agudelo
40	GK	BIH	Petar Zovko
43	DF	GRE	Dimitrios Nikolaou
55	DF	POL	Przemysław Wiśniewski
69	GK	POL	Bartłomiej Drągowski
72	MF	SLO	Tio Cipot
77	MF	POL	Szymon Żurkowski (on loan from Fiorentina)

=== Out on loan ===
As of 31 January 2023

Note: Flags indicate national team as defined under FIFA eligibility rules; some limited exceptions apply. Players may hold more than one non-FIFA nationality.

No.	Pos.	Nation	Player
—	DF	ITA	Nicolò Bertola (at Montevarchi until 30 June 2023)
—	DF	ITA	Lorenzo Colombini (at Renate until 30 June 2023)
—	DF	ITA	Leonardo Gabelli (at Pergolettese until 30 June 2023)
—	DF	BUL	Petko Hristov (at Venezia until 30 June 2023)
—	DF	ITA	Laurens Serpe (at Imolese until 30 June 2023)
—	MF	DEN	Emil Kornvig (at Cosenza until 30 June 2023)
—	MF	FRA	Aurélien Nguiamba (at Jagiellonia until 30 June 2023)

No.	Pos.	Nation	Player
—	MF	ISR	Suf Podgoreanu (at Maccabi Haifa until 30 June 2023)
—	MF	SWE	Aimar Sher (at Groningen until 30 June 2024)
—	FW	SVK	Samuel Mráz (at Anorthosis until 30 June 2023)
—	FW	ITA	Henoc N'Gbesso (at Alessandria until 30 June 2023)
—	FW	POR	Leandro Sanca (at Famalicão until 30 June 2023)
—	FW	SVK	David Strelec (at Reggina until 30 June 2023)

== Pre-season and friendlies ==
Win Draw Loss Fixtures

10 July 2022 Friendly	Spezia (Italy)	8–0	(Italy) FC Gherdëina	Val Gardena
--:-- CEST (UTC+2)		Report		Referee: Andrea Terribile

16 July 2022 Friendly	Spezia (Italy)	1–2	(Germany) VfL Bochum	Brixen
16:30 CEST (UTC+2)	Agudelo 86'		Asano 62'; Losilla 66'	Stadium: Sportplatz Klaus Seebacher

17 July 2022 Friendly	Spezia (Italy)	8–0	(Italy) ASV Stegen	Santa Cristina Gherdëina
17:30 CEST (UTC+2)

21 July 2022 Friendly	Spezia (Italy)	3–0	(Czech Republic) Jablonec	Santa Cristina Gherdëina
17:00 CEST (UTC+2)				Stadium: Centro Sportivo Mulin da Coi

27 July 2022 Friendly	Padova (Italy)	1–5	(Italy) Spezia	Padua
20:30 CEST (UTC+2)	Sala 6' (o.g.)		Caldara 5'; Strelec 24'; Podgoreanu 77'; Agudelo 90+3'; Antiste 90+2'	Stadium: Stadio Comunale Euganeo; Referee: Francesco Zago

30 July 2022 Friendly	Angers (France)	2–2	(Italy) Spezia	Angers, France
17:30 CEST (UTC+2)	Hunou 20'; Sima 49' (pen.)		Doumbia 24' (o.g.); Verde 53'	Stadium: Stade Raymond Kopa

10 December 2022 Friendly	Spezia (Italy)	7–1	(Italy) Sampdoria Primavera	Follo
11:00 CET (UTC+1)		Report		Attendance: 0

14 December 2022 Friendly	Servette (Switzerland)	0–3	(Italy) Spezia	Oliva, Spain
15:00 CET (UTC+1)			Strelec 40'; Bastoni 55' (pen.); Maldini 77'	Stadium: Oliva Nova Golf & Beach Resort Campo 2

17 December 2022 Friendly	Spezia (Italy)	1–3	(Netherlands) Sparta Rotterdam	Oliva, Spain
14:00 CET (UTC+1)	Gyasi 105'		Verschueren 33'; Saito 73'; Tahiri 105+2'	Stadium: Oliva Nova Golf & Beach Resort Campo 1

20 December 2022 Friendly	Spezia (Italy)	2–0	(Netherlands) Groningen	Benidorm, Spain
15:00 CET (UTC+1)	Verde 41'; Kiwior 57'			Stadium: Estadio Municipal Guillermo Amor

== Competitions ==
=== Overall record ===
Competition	First match	Last match	Starting round	Final position	Record							
Competition	First match	Last match	Starting round	Final position	Pld	W	D	L	GF	GA	GD	Win %
Serie A	14 August 2022	4 June 2023	Matchday 1	18th	38	6	13	19	31	62	−31	15.79
Serie A relegation tie-breaker	11 June 2023		Play-off	Runners-up	1	0	0	1	1	3	−2	0.00
Coppa Italia	6 August 2022	19 January 2023	Round of 64	Round of 16	3	2	0	1	10	7	+3	66.67
Total					42	8	13	21	42	72	−30	19.05

Source: Soccerway

=== Serie A ===
==== League table ====
Pos	Team	Pld	W	D	L	GF	GA	GD	Pts	Qualification or relegation
16	Lecce	38	8	12	18	33	46	−13	36	
17	Hellas Verona	38	7	10	21	31	59	−28	31	Qualification for the Relegation tie-breaker
18	Spezia (R)	38	6	13	19	31	62	−31	31	Qualification for the Relegation tie-breaker (Note: Should the first and second, or 17th and 18th-placed teams at the end of the season be tied on points, a play-off tiebreaker match was held at a neutral site to determine the title and final team relegated respectively.)
19	Cremonese (R)	38	5	12	21	36	69	−33	27	Relegation to Serie B
20	Sampdoria (R)	38	3	10	25	24	71	−47	19	Relegation to Serie B

Source: Serie A
Rules for classification: 1) Points; 2) Tiebreaker for Champions team and third relegated team; 3) Head-to-head points; 4) Head-to-head goal difference; 5) Goal difference; 6) Goals scored; 7) Draw. (Note: Head-to-head record is used only after all the matches between the teams in question have been played)
(R) Relegated

==== Results summary ====
Overall								Home						Away					
Pld	W	D	L	GF	GA	GD	Pts	W	D	L	GF	GA	GD	W	D	L	GF	GA	GD
38	6	13	19	31	62	−31	31	4	8	7	18	30	−12	2	5	12	13	32	−19

Source: Serie A

==== Results by round ====
Round	1	2	3	4	5	6	7	8	9	10	11	12	13	14	15	16	17	18	19	20	21	22	23	24	25	26	27	28	29	30	31	32	33	34	35	36	37	38
Ground	H	A	H	A	H	A	H	A	A	H	A	H	A	H	A	H	H	A	H	A	H	A	H	A	H	H	A	H	A	H	A	H	A	A	H	A	H	A
Result	W	L	D	L	D	L	W	L	L	D	L	L	L	D	W	D	D	W	L	L	L	D	L	D	D	W	L	D	D	L	D	L	L	L	W	D	L	L
Position	9	11	13	13	14	15	12	12	15	15	16	16	17	17	17	17	17	15	15	17	17	17	17	17	17	17	17	17	17	17	17	17	17	18	17	17	17	18

Source: Serie A
A = Away; H = Home; W = Win; D = Draw; L = Loss

==== Matches ====
The league fixtures were announced on 24 June 2022.

14 August 2022 1	Spezia	1–0	Empoli	La Spezia
20:45 CEST (UTC+2)	Gyasi (yellow card) 4'; Nzola 36'; Reca (yellow card) 60'	Report	Henderson (yellow card) 14'	Stadium: Stadio Alberto Picco; Attendance: 8,360; Referee: Daniele Chiffi

20 August 2022 2	Internazionale	3–0	Spezia	Milan
20:45 CEST (UTC+2)	Martínez 37'; Çalhanoğlu 52'; Correa 82'	Report		Stadium: San Siro; Attendance: 71,212; Referee: Davide Ghersini

27 August 2022 3	Spezia	2–2	Sassuolo	La Spezia
20:45 CEST (UTC+2)	Bastoni 30'; Nzola 45+4' (pen.); Ekdal (yellow card) 68' (yellow-red card) 82'	Report	Frattesi 27'; Ferrari (yellow card) 45+2'; Pinamonti 50'	Stadium: Stadio Alberto Picco; Attendance: 6,500; Referee: Francesco Cosso

31 August 2022 4	Juventus	2–0	Spezia	Turin
20:45 CEST (UTC+2)	Vlahović 9'; Milik 90+2'	Report	Bastoni (yellow card) 11'; Holm (yellow card) 73'	Stadium: Juventus Stadium; Attendance: 35,709; Referee: Andrea Colombo

4 September 2022 5	Spezia	2–2	Bologna	La Spezia
15:00 CEST (UTC+2)	Holm (yellow card) 38'; Bastoni 45+2', (yellow card) 56'; Schouten 54' (o.g.); Sala (yellow card) 90+1'; Nikolaou (yellow card) 90+6'	Report	Arnautović 7', 64'; Zirkzee (yellow card) 90+6'	Stadium: Stadio Alberto Picco; Attendance: 18,000; Referee: Antonio Giua

10 September 2022 6	Napoli	1–0	Spezia	Naples
15:00 CEST (UTC+2)	Elmas (yellow card) 71'; Raspadori 89'	Report	Gyasi (yellow card) 45'; Drągowski (yellow card) 77'	Stadium: Stadio Diego Armando Maradona; Attendance: 35,000; Referee: Alberto Santoro

17 September 2022 7	Spezia	2–1	Sampdoria	La Spezia
18:00 CEST (UTC+2)	Murillo 12' (o.g.); Bastoni (yellow card) 42'; Kovalenko (yellow card) 59'; Nzola 72', (yellow card) 90'; Ellertsson (yellow card) 89'	Report	Sabiri 11'; Ferrari (yellow card) 23'; Villar (yellow card) 43'; Léris (yellow card) 69'; Đuričić (yellow card) 78'; Murillo (yellow card) 89'	Stadium: Stadio Alberto Picco; Attendance: 10,000; Referee: Simone Sozza

2 October 2022 8	Lazio	4–0	Spezia	Rome
12:30 CEST (UTC+2)	Immobile (penalty missed) 3'; Zaccagni 12'; Romagnoli 24'; Milinković-Savić 62', 90+1'	Report	Ampadu (yellow card) 1'; Gyasi (yellow card) 45+1'	Stadium: Stadio Olimpico; Attendance: 41,000; Referee: Juan Luca Sacchi

9 October 2022 9	Monza	2–0	Spezia	Monza
15:00 CEST (UTC+2)	Carlos Augusto 32'; Sensi (yellow card) 34'; Izzo (yellow card) 49'; Marí 63'; Ranocchia (yellow card) 88'	Report	Nzola (yellow card) 41'; Nikolaou (yellow card) 59'	Stadium: Stadio Olimpico; Attendance: 12,094; Referee: Daniele Perenzoni

16 October 2022 10	Spezia	2–2	Cremonese	La Spezia
15:00 CEST (UTC+2)	Nzola 19'; Holm 22'; Agudelo (yellow card) 61'; Caldara (yellow card) 89'	Report	Dessers 2'; Pickel 52'	Stadium: Stadio Alberto Picco; Attendance: 8,400; Referee: Gianluca Manganiello

22 October 2022 11	Salernitana	1–0	Spezia	Salerno
15:00 CEST (UTC+2)	Vilhena (yellow card) 19'; Mazzocchi 48'; Daniliuc (yellow card) 81'	Report	Amian (yellow card) 20'; Kiwior (yellow card) 61'; Agudelo (yellow card) 81'; Holm (yellow card) 82'	Stadium: Stadio Arechi; Attendance: 17,260; Referee: Daniele Chiffi

30 October 2022 12	Spezia	1–2	Fiorentina	La Spezia
15:00 CET (UTC+1)	Nikolaou (yellow card) 7', (red card) 82'; Gyasi (yellow card) 24'; Nzola 35', (yellow card) 90+3'; Ekdal (yellow card) 61'; Amian (yellow card) 69'	Report	Milenković 14'; Ikoné (yellow card) 20'; Amrabat (yellow card) 21'; Cabral 90'; Maleh (yellow card) 90+5'	Stadium: Stadio Alberto Picco; Attendance: 10,500; Referee: Davide Massa

5 November 2022 13	Milan	2–1	Spezia	Milan
20:45 CET (UTC+1)	Hernandez 21', (yellow card) 83'; Bennacer (yellow card) 40'; Messias (yellow card) 63'; Giroud (yellow card) 83' (yellow-red card) 90', (goal) 89'; Tonali (yellow card) 90+3'	Report	Maldini 59'; Ampadu (yellow card) 74'; Ellertsson (yellow card) 81'; Nzola (yellow card) 83'; Caldara (yellow card) 88'	Stadium: San Siro; Attendance: 71,099; Referee: Michael Fabbri

8 November 2022 14	Spezia	1–1	Udinese	La Spezia
18:30 CET (UTC+1)	Reca 33'; Bourabia (yellow card) 36'; Kiwior (yellow card) 45'; Bastoni (yellow card) 84'	Report	Arslan (yellow card) 17'; Lovrić 43'; Success (yellow card) 72'; Nuytinck (yellow card) 73'	Stadium: Stadio Alberto Picco; Attendance: 6,900; Referee: Marco Piccinini

13 November 2022 15	Hellas Verona	1–2	Spezia	Verona
15:00 CET (UTC+1)	Verdi 30'; Lasagna (yellow card) 45+2'; Tameze (yellow card) 78'	Report	Ampadu (yellow card) 33'; Holm (yellow card) 35'; Nzola 53', 69'; Amian (yellow card) 86'; Ellertsson (yellow card) 90+4'	Stadium: Stadio Marcantonio Bentegodi; Attendance: 15,713; Referee: Fabio Maresca

4 January 2023 16	Spezia	2–2	Atalanta	La Spezia
14:30 CET (UTC+1)	Gyasi 8'; Nzola 31'; Kiwior (yellow card) 49'; Ampadu (yellow card) 56'; Nikolaou (yellow card) 83'	Report	Lookman (yellow card) 45+7'; Zappacosta (yellow card) 58'; Højlund 77'; Pašalić 90+2'	Stadium: Stadio Alberto Picco; Attendance: 7,414; Referee: Antonio Giua

8 January 2023 17	Spezia	0–0	Lecce	La Spezia
15:00 CET (UTC+1)		Report	Baschirotto (yellow card) 56'	Stadium: Stadio Alberto Picco; Attendance: 7,300; Referee: Daniele Chiffi

15 January 2023 18	Torino	0–1	Spezia	Turin
15:00 CET (UTC+1)	Djidji (yellow card) 28'; Ricci (yellow card) 76'	Report	Nzola 28' (pen.); Caldara (yellow card) 51'; Bourabia (yellow card) 61'; Nikolaou (yellow card) 90+7'	Stadium: Stadio Olimpico Grande Torino; Attendance: 15,113; Referee: Davide Ghersini

22 January 2023 19	Spezia	0–2	Roma	La Spezia
18:00 CET (UTC+1)	Bourabia (yellow card) 36'; Caldara (yellow card) 40'; Reca (yellow card) 58'	Report	El Shaarawy 45'; Abraham 49'; Çelik (yellow card) 88'	Stadium: Stadio Alberto Picco; Attendance: 9,153; Referee: Simone Sozza

27 January 2023 20	Bologna	2–0	Spezia	Bologna
18:30 CET (UTC+1)	Posch 37', (yellow card) 83'; Soumaoro (yellow card) 61'; Orsolini 77'	Report	Gyasi (yellow card) 87'; Esposito (yellow card) 88'	Stadium: Stadio Renato Dall'Ara; Attendance: 17,123; Referee: Luca Massimi

5 February 2023 21	Spezia	0–3	Napoli	La Spezia
12:30 CET (UTC+1)	Ampadu (yellow card) 16'; Caldara (yellow card) 50'; Reca (yellow card) 85'	Report	Lozano (yellow card) 19'; Kvaratskhelia 47' (pen.); Zieliński (yellow card) 52'; Osimhen 68', 73'	Stadium: Stadio Alberto Picco; Attendance: 10,000; Referee: Marco Di Bello

11 February 2023 22	Empoli	2–2	Spezia	Empoli
15:00 CET (UTC+1)	Parisi (red card) 21'; Vicario (yellow card) 25'; Cambiaghi 71'; Vignato 90+4'	Report	Nikolaou (yellow card) 25'; Verde 25' (pen.), 31', (yellow card) 33'; Esposito (yellow card) 39' (yellow-red card) 49'; Ekdal (yellow card) 63'	Stadium: Stadio Carlo Castellani; Attendance: 7,871; Referee: Antonio Giua

19 February 2023 23	Spezia	0–2	Juventus	La Spezia
18:00 CET (UTC+1)	Agudelo (yellow card) 16'; Reca (yellow card) 55'	Report	Locatelli (yellow card) 1'; Kean 32'; Fagioli (yellow card) 51'; Di María 66'	Stadium: Stadio Alberto Picco; Attendance: 11,767; Referee: Federico La Penna

26 February 2023 24	Udinese	2–2	Spezia	Udine
18:00 CET (UTC+1)	Beto 22'; Pereyra 55'; Ehizibue (yellow card) 58'; Becão (yellow card) 62'	Report	Nzola 6', 72'; Nikolaou (yellow card) 75'; Shomurodov (yellow card) 90+4'	Stadium: Stadio Friuli; Attendance: 20,710; Referee: Matteo Marchetti

5 March 2023 25	Spezia	0–0	Hellas Verona	La Spezia
12:30 CET (UTC+1)	Marchetti (red card) 83'; Reca (yellow card) 90'; Żurkowski (yellow card) 90+5'	Report	Terracciano (yellow card) 90+3'	Stadium: Stadio Alberto Picco; Attendance: 10,020; Referee: Daniele Doveri
Note: Marchetti was sent off for dissent while a substitute.

10 March 2023 26	Spezia	2–1	Internazionale	La Spezia
20:45 CET (UTC+1)	Gyasi (yellow card) 6'; Caldara (yellow card) 12'; Maldini 55'; Nikolaou (yellow card) 71'; Nzola 87' (pen.)	Report	Martínez (penalty missed) 14'; Lukaku 83' (pen.)	Stadium: Stadio Alberto Picco; Attendance: 11,767; Referee: Livio Marinelli

17 March 2023 27	Sassuolo	1–0	Spezia	Reggio Emilia
18:30 CET (UTC+1)	Berardi 71' (pen.)	Report	Nzola (yellow card) 66'; Amian (yellow card) 70'	Stadium: Mapei Stadium – Città del Tricolore; Attendance: 11,152; Referee: Davide Ghersini

2 April 2023 28	Spezia	1–1	Salernitana	La Spezia
15:00 CEST (UTC+2)	Shomurodov 70'	Report	Caldara 43' (o.g.); Coulibaly (yellow card) 77'	Stadium: Stadio Alberto Picco; Attendance: 10,723; Referee: Daniele Orsato

8 April 2023 29	Fiorentina	1–1	Spezia	Florence
14:30 CEST (UTC+2)	Wiśniewski 25' (o.g.)	Report	Maldini (yellow card) 35'; Nzola 32', (yellow card) 45'; Gyasi (yellow card) 45+1'; Ampadu (yellow card) 63'; Bastoni (yellow card) 68'; Ekdal (yellow card) 72'; Wiśniewski (yellow card) 77'	Stadium: Stadio Artemio Franchi; Attendance: 35,863; Referee: Federico Dionisi

14 April 2023 30	Spezia	0–3	Lazio	La Spezia
20:45 CEST (UTC+2)	Gyasi (yellow card) 30'; Ampadu (yellow card) 33' (yellow-red card) 84'	Report	Immobile 36' (pen.); Felipe Anderson 52'; Cataldi (yellow card) 72'; Antônio (yellow card) 81', (goal) 89'; Romagnoli (yellow card) 83'; Cancellieri (yellow card) 89'	Stadium: Stadio Alberto Picco; Attendance: 9,500; Referee: Massimiliano Irrati

22 April 2023 31	Sampdoria	1–1	Spezia	Genoa
20:45 CEST (UTC+2)	Amione 23'; Günter (yellow card) 67'	Report	Verde 59'; Bastoni (yellow card) 73'	Stadium: Stadio Luigi Ferraris; Attendance: 19,181; Referee: Fabio Maresca

28 April 2023 32	Spezia	0–2	Monza	La Spezia
20:45 CEST (UTC+2)	Gyasi (yellow card) 34'	Report	Ciurria 21'; Birindelli (yellow card) 68'; Sensi (yellow card) 90+2'; Carlos Augusto 90+3'	Stadium: Stadio Alberto Picco; Attendance: 9,200; Referee: Antonio Rapuano

3 May 2023 33	Atalanta	3–2	Spezia	Bergamo
18:00 CEST (UTC+2)	De Roon 32'; Zappacosta 48'; Muriel 54'	Report	Gyasi 18'; Ampadu (yellow card) 38'; Bastoni (yellow card) 40'; Bourabia 64'; Agudelo (yellow card) 75'	Stadium: Gewiss Stadium; Attendance: 17,417; Referee: Livio Marinelli

6 May 2023 34	Cremonese	2–0	Spezia	Cremona
20:45 CEST (UTC+2)	Ciofani 41'; Vásquez 77'	Report	Agudelo (yellow card) 76'; Ampadu (yellow card) 79'	Stadium: Stadio Giovanni Zini; Attendance: 10,260; Referee: Marco Guida

13 May 2023 35	Spezia	2–0	Milan	La Spezia
18:00 CEST (UTC+2)	Adou (yellow card) 38'; Wiśniewski 75'; Esposito 85'	Report	Brahim (yellow card) 52'	Stadium: Stadio Alberto Picco; Attendance: 11,336; Referee: Daniele Doveri

21 May 2023 36	Lecce	0–0	Spezia	Lecce
12:30 CEST (UTC+2)	Umtiti (yellow card) 49'; Blin (yellow card) 89'	Report	Wiśniewski (yellow card) 59'; Esposito (yellow card) 86'; Nzola (yellow card) 89'	Stadium: Stadio Via del mare Attendance: 26,022; Referee: Maurizio Mariani

27 May 2023 37	Spezia	0–4	Torino	La Spezia
15:00 CEST (UTC+2)	Ekdal (yellow card) 11'; Nzola (yellow card) 75'	Report	Ilić (yellow card) 16', (goal) 76'; Wiśniewski 24' (o.g.); Singo (yellow card) 69'; Ricci 72'; Karamoh 90+6'	Stadium: Stadio Alberto Picco; Attendance: 10,776; Referee: Marco Guida

4 June 2023 38	Roma	2–1	Spezia	Rome
21:00 CEST (UTC+2)	Zalewski 43'; Pellegrini (yellow card) 44'; Dybala (yellow card) 78', (goal) 90+1' (pen.)	Report	Nikolaou 6', (yellow card) 58'; Esposito (yellow card) 14'; Zoet (yellow card) 66'; Amian (yellow card) 76' (yellow-red card) 89'; Gyasi (yellow card) 87'; Ampadu (yellow card) 89'; Wiśniewski (yellow card) 90+7'; Shomurodov (yellow card) 90+12'	Stadium: Stadio Olimpico; Attendance: 62,242; Referee: Fabio Maresca

==== Relegation tie-breaker ====
11 June 2023 Play-off	Spezia	1–3	Hellas Verona	Reggio Emilia
20:45 CEST (UTC+2)	Ampadu 15'; Nzola (penalty missed) 70'; Reca (yellow card) 71'; Esposito (yellow card) 77'	Report	Faraoni 5', (red card) 68'; Hien (yellow card) 14'; Ngonge 26', 38', (yellow card) 70'; Depaoli (yellow card) 28'; Dawidowicz (yellow card) 32'; Montipò (yellow card) 66'	Stadium: Mapei Stadium – Città del Tricolore; Attendance: 15,000; Referee: Daniele Orsato

=== Coppa Italia ===
6 August 2022 Round of 64	Spezia	5–1	Como	La Spezia
18:00 CEST (UTC+2)	Nzola 43', 76' (pen.); Verde 60' (pen.); Bastoni (yellow card) 62'; Strelec 71'; Maldini 89'	Report	Cagnano (yellow card) 38'; Blanco 55', (yellow card) 63'	Stadium: Stadio Alberto Picco; Attendance: 5,826; Referee: Francesco Meraviglia

19 October 2022 Round of 32	Spezia	3–1	Brescia	La Spezia
15:00 CEST (UTC+2)	Strelec 20', 86'; Ferrer (yellow card) 43'; Verde 55'; Agudelo (yellow card) 79'	Report	Olzer (yellow card) 45+2'; Moreo 90+3'	Stadium: Stadio Alberto Picco; Attendance: 2,500; Referee: Federico La Penna

19 January 2023 Round of 16	Atalanta	5–2	Spezia	Bergamo
15:00 CET (UTC+1)	Éderson (yellow card) 5'; Lookman 10', 12'; Hateboer 26'; Højlund 72'; Ampadu 90' (o.g.)	Report	Ekdal 14'; Verde 38'; Hristov (yellow card) 66'; Ampadu (yellow card) 89'	Stadium: Gewiss Stadium; Attendance: 7,483; Referee: Andrea Colombo
