= Ethan Ampadu =

Wales international footballer (born 2000)

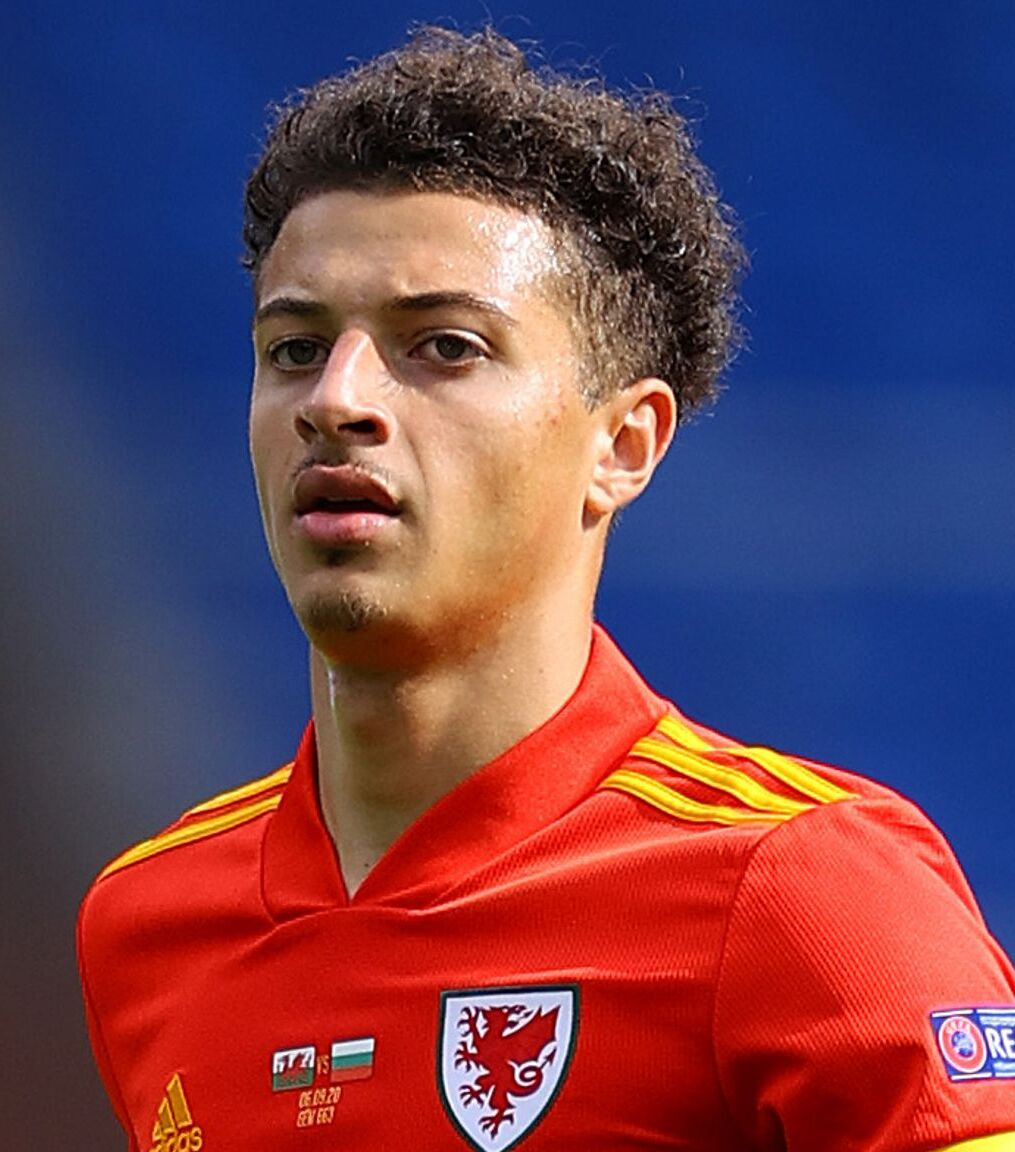
- Ampadu with Wales in 2020

Personal information
- Full name: Ethan Kwame Colm Raymond Ampadu
- Date of birth: 14 September 2000 (age 26)
- Place of birth: Exeter, England
- Height: 6 ft 0 in (1.82 m)
- Position: Defensive midfielder

Team information
- Current team: Leeds United
- Number: 4

Youth career
- 2008–2016: Exeter City

Senior career*
| Years | Team | Apps | (Gls) |
| 2016–2017 | Exeter City | 8 | (0) |
| 2017–2023 | Chelsea | 1 | (0) |
| 2019–2020 | → RB Leipzig (loan) | 3 | (0) |
| 2020–2021 | → Sheffield United (loan) | 25 | (0) |
| 2021–2022 | → Venezia (loan) | 29 | (0) |
| 2022–2023 | → Spezia (loan) | 31 | (0) |
| 2023– | Leeds United | 120 | (1) |

International career^{‡}
| 2015–2016 | Wales U17 | 6 | (0) |
| 2016 | Wales U19 | 3 | (0) |
| 2017– | Wales | 68 | (0) |
- * Club domestic league appearances and goals as of 22:13, 8 November 2026 (UTC) ‡ National team caps and goals as of 19:19, 14 November 2026 (UTC)

Ethan Kwame Colm Raymond Ampadu (born 14 September 2000) is a professional footballer who plays as a defensive midfielder for and captains Premier League club Leeds United and the Wales national team.

Ampadu went to Ladysmith Junior School and joined Exeter City's academy at the age of 7. Having come up through the academy, Ampadu became the youngest player to appear for the first team at age 15. He joined Chelsea in July 2017, where he went out on loan to German club RB Leipzig, before suffering consecutive relegations at Sheffield United and then at Italian sides Venezia and Spezia. In July 2023, Ampadu left Chelsea to join Leeds United on a permanent transfer.

Ampadu played for Wales at under-16, under-17 and under-19 level before making his senior debut for Wales in November 2017. He represented the country at UEFA Euro 2020 and the 2022 FIFA World Cup.

== Club career ==
=== Exeter City ===
Born in Exeter, Devon, Ampadu is the son of former professional footballer Kwame Ampadu. A product of the Exeter City youth academy, appearing for the under-18 squad at the age of 14, he made his senior debut – aged 15 years, 10 months and 26 days – in an EFL Cup first round match against Brentford at St James Park on 9 August 2016, playing the full 120 minutes of a 1–0 victory. He became the club's youngest ever player, breaking an 87-year-old record set by Cliff Bastin, and being named man of the match. Ampadu's record was beaten by Ben Chrisene in August 2019. A week later, he made his league debut in a 1–0 home defeat against Crawley Town in EFL League Two.

=== Chelsea ===
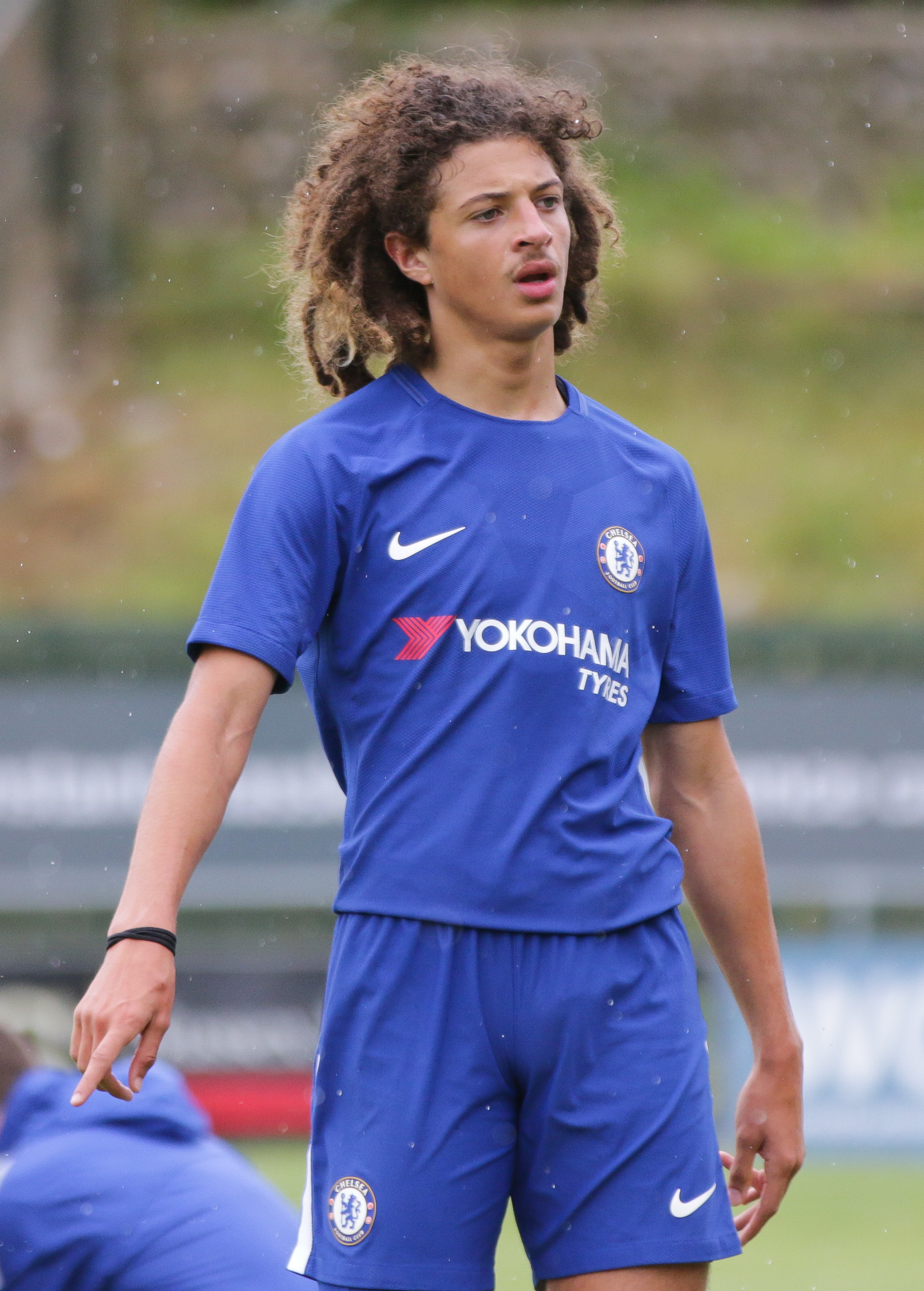
Ampadu playing for Chelsea's reserve team in 2017.

On 1 July 2017, Ampadu signed a contract with Premier League club Chelsea. The two clubs had entered negotiations over a compensation fee for the player in an attempt to reach a fee that both found acceptable for the then 16-year-old. Yet, in November 2017, Exeter City chairman Julian Tagg said that, whilst there was still a positive relationship between the two clubs, there was also a "massive disparity" in both clubs' valuation of the player. It was set to go to a tribunal.

On 20 September 2017, Ampadu made his debut for Chelsea in an EFL Cup third round match against Nottingham Forest, coming on in the 55th minute for Cesc Fàbregas. Doing so made him the first player born in the 2000s to play for the Chelsea senior team. At 17 years and six days old, he also became the youngest player to debut for the club in over ten years. On 12 December 2017, he made his Premier League debut for Chelsea, coming on as a substitute against Huddersfield Town in the 80th minute. In September 2018, he signed a new five-year contract with Chelsea.

==== Loan spells ====
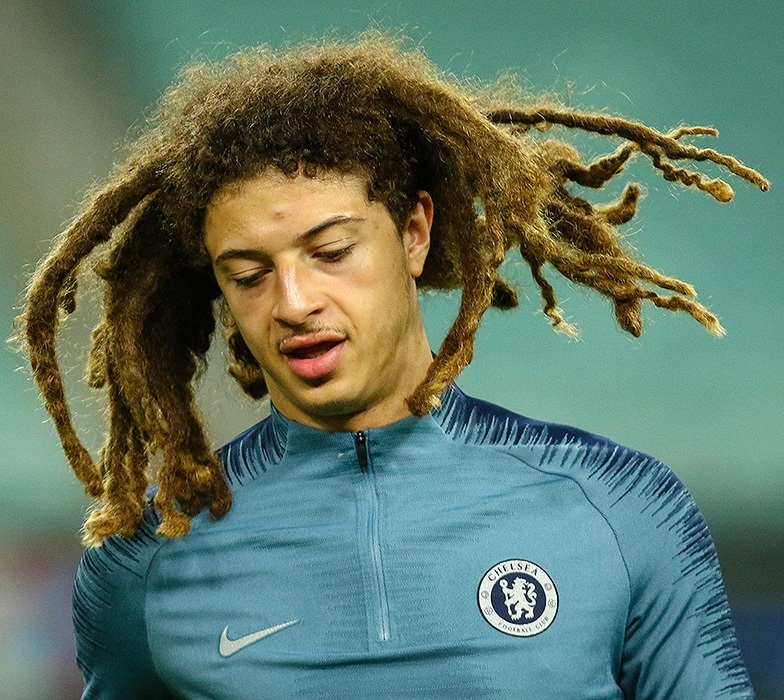
Ampadu warming up before the UEFA Europa League final against Arsenal.

In July 2019, new manager Frank Lampard confirmed that Ampadu would spend the 2019–20 season out on loan at another club. In that period, Ampadu joined Bundesliga club RB Leipzig on a season-long loan deal.

On 7 September 2020, Ampadu joined fellow Premier League club Sheffield United on a season-long loan. He played 29 games in all competitions for the Blades, who were relegated at the end of the season.

On 31 August 2021, Ampadu joined Serie A club Venezia on a season-long loan after signing a new three-year deal with Chelsea. Venezia were relegated at the end of the season.

On 1 September 2022, Ampadu joined Serie A club Spezia on a season-long loan. Spezia finished the season in 17th place, meaning they had to play Hellas Verona, the 18th placed team, in a one-off relegation play-off in Sassuolo's Mapei Stadium. Ampadu scored the equaliser for Spezia, scoring his first goal in the professional game in the process, but he could not prevent a 3–1 loss.

=== Leeds United ===
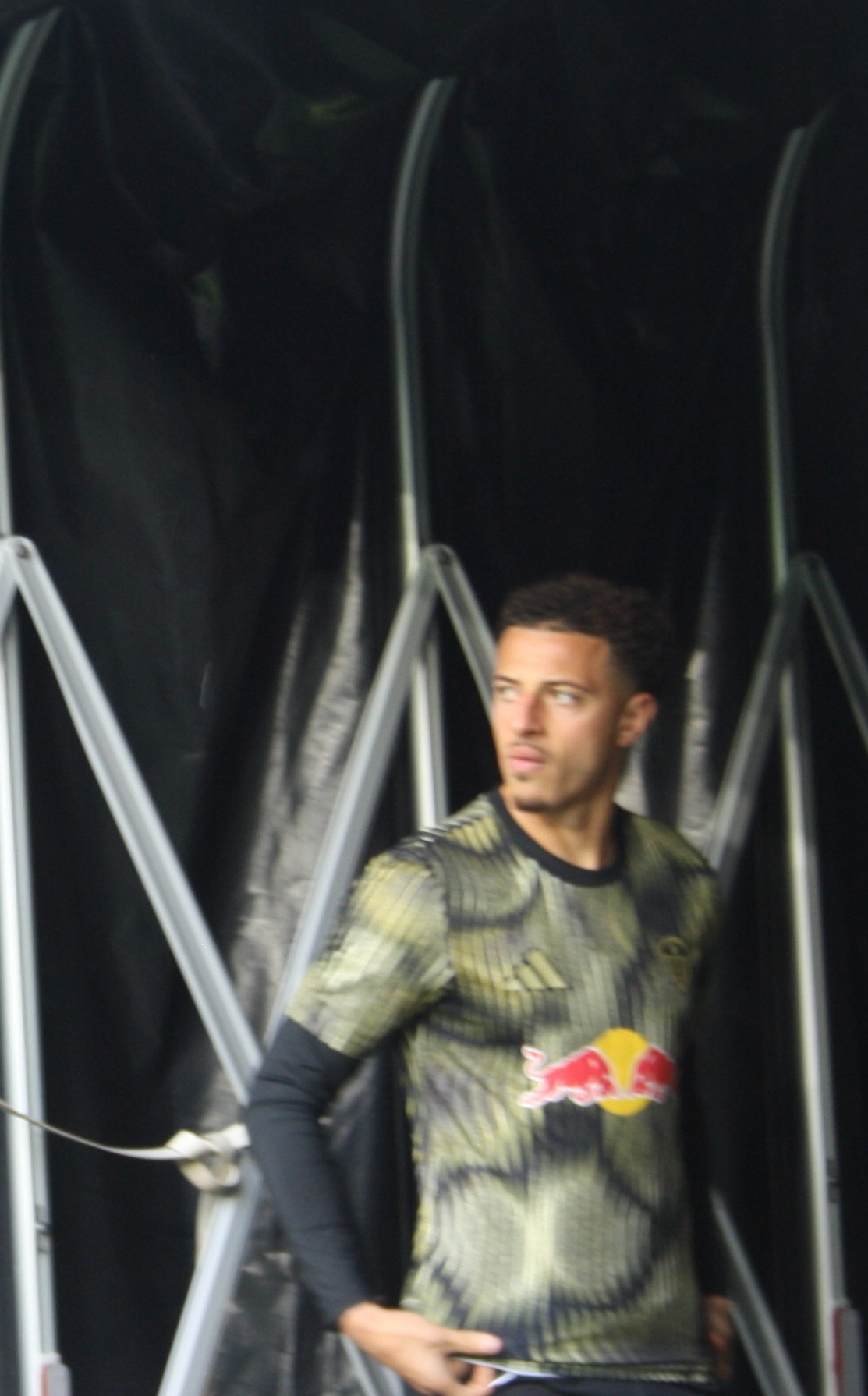
Ampadu warming up prior to Leeds United's match against Fulham on 13 September 2025.

On 19 July 2023, Ampadu joined Championship club Leeds United on a four-year contract, for a reported fee of £7m plus performance-related add-ons. On 6 August 2023, he made his debut for the club in a 2–2 draw against Cardiff City. On 7 January 2024, he scored his first two goals for Leeds United in a 3–0 win over Peterborough in a third round FA Cup tie. On 23 July 2024, Ampadu was named as the club's captain.

As captain, during the 2024–25 season, Ampadu was promoted to the Premier League with Leeds and won the EFL Championship title. He also won the 2024–25 PFA Community Champion award for his community service work, which included community visits and participating in educational initiatives during the season.

Ampadu scored his first league goal with Leeds United in a 4–1 win against Crystal Palace on 20 December 2025. On 4 June 2026, he extended his contract with the club until 2030.

== International career ==
Ampadu plays internationally for the Wales national football team. He qualifies for Wales through his Welsh mother. He was previously also eligible to represent England, Republic of Ireland and Ghana.

On 26 May 2017, at the age of 16, Ampadu was called into the senior Wales squad ahead of their World Cup qualifier with Serbia. He was called up again on 1 November 2017 for friendlies against France and Panama, and made his debut aged 17 on 10 November 2017 against France at the Stade de France, coming on as a 63rd-minute substitute for Joe Ledley in a 2–0 defeat.

In May 2021, Ampadu was selected for the Wales squad for the delayed UEFA Euro 2020 tournament. On 20 June, in the 55th-minute of Wales' 1–0 defeat to Italy, he received a straight red card for a late challenge on Federico Bernardeschi, becoming the youngest player to receive one at the European Championships. In November 2022, he was named in the Wales squad for the 2022 FIFA World Cup in Qatar.

== Career statistics ==
=== Club ===
As of match played 18 October 2026

Appearances and goals by club, season and competition
| club | Season | League | | | National cup (Note: Includes FA Cup, DFB-Pokal, Coppa Italia) | | League cup (Note: Includes EFL Cup) | | Europe | | Other | | Total | |
| club | Season | Division | Apps | Goals | Apps | Goals | Apps | Goals | Apps | Goals | Apps | Goals | Apps | Goals |
|---|---|---|---|---|---|---|---|---|---|---|---|---|---|---|
| Exeter City | 2016–17 | League Two | 8 | 0 | 1 | 0 | 2 | 0 | — | | 2 (Note: Appearances in EFL Trophy) | 0 | 13 | 0 |
| Chelsea | 2017–18 | Premier League | 1 | 0 | 3 | 0 | 3 | 0 | 0 | 0 | 0 | 0 | 7 | 0 |
| Chelsea | 2018–19 | Premier League | 0 | 0 | 2 | 0 | 0 | 0 | 3 (Note: Appearances in UEFA Europa League) | 0 | 0 | 0 | 5 | 0 |
| Chelsea | Total | | 1 | 0 | 5 | 0 | 3 | 0 | 3 | 0 | 0 | 0 | 12 | 0 |
| Chelsea U23 | 2017–18 | — | | | — | | — | | — | | 5 | 0 | 5 | 0 |
| RB Leipzig (loan) | 2019–20 | Bundesliga | 3 | 0 | 1 | 0 | — | | 3 (Note: Appearances in UEFA Champions League) | 0 | — | | 7 | 0 |
| Sheffield United (loan) | 2020–21 | Premier League | 25 | 0 | 3 | 0 | 1 | 0 | — | | — | | 29 | 0 |
| Venezia (loan) | 2021–22 | Serie A | 29 | 0 | 1 | 0 | — | | — | | — | | 30 | 0 |
| Spezia (loan) | 2022–23 | Serie A | 31 | 0 | 2 | 0 | — | | — | | 1 (Note: Appearance in Serie A relegation play-off) | 1 | 34 | 1 |
| Leeds United | 2023–24 | Championship | 46 | 0 | 3 | 2 | 2 | 0 | — | | 3 (Note: Appearances in Championship play-offs) | 0 | 54 | 2 |
| Leeds United | 2024–25 | Championship | 29 | 0 | 2 | 0 | 1 | 0 | — | | — | | 32 | 0 |
| Leeds United | 2025–26 | Premier League | 35 | 1 | 5 | 0 | 0 | 0 | — | | — | | 40 | 1 |
| Leeds United | 2026–27 | Premier League | 7 | 0 | 0 | 0 | 2 | 0 | — | | — | | 9 | 0 |
| Leeds United | Total | | 117 | 1 | 10 | 2 | 5 | 0 | — | | 3 | 0 | 135 | 3 |
| Career total | | | 211 | 1 | 22 | 2 | 11 | 0 | 6 | 0 | 11 | 1 | 261 | 4 |

=== International ===
As of match played 14 November 2026

Appearances and goals by national team and year
| National team | Year | Apps | Goals |
|---|---|---|---|
| Wales | 2017 | 2 | 0 |
| Wales | 2018 | 4 | 0 |
| Wales | 2019 | 7 | 0 |
| Wales | 2020 | 7 | 0 |
| Wales | 2021 | 11 | 0 |
| Wales | 2022 | 9 | 0 |
| Wales | 2023 | 9 | 0 |
| Wales | 2024 | 5 | 0 |
| Wales | 2025 | 5 | 0 |
| Wales | 2026 | 9 | 0 |
| Total | | 68 | 0 |

== Honours ==
Chelsea

- FA Cup: 2017–18
- UEFA Europa League: 2018–19

Leeds United

- EFL Championship: 2024–25

Individual

- Wales Young Player of the Year: 2016
- EFL Championship Team of the Season: 2023–24
- PFA Team of the Year: 2023–24 Championship
- The Athletic Championship Team of the Season: 2023–24
