= Jakub Kiwior =

Polish footballer (born 2000)

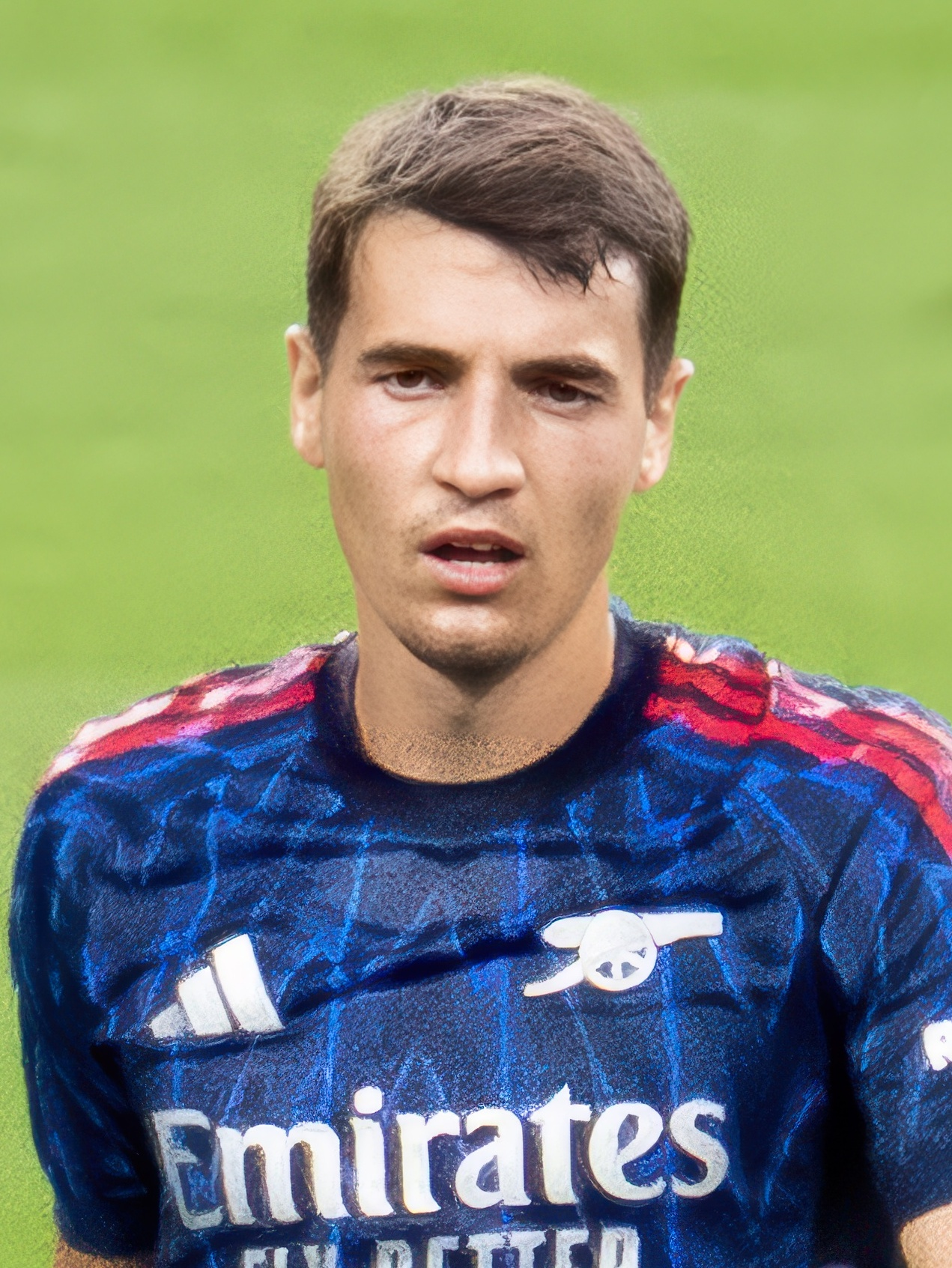
- Kiwior with Arsenal in 2025

Personal information
- Full name: Jakub Piotr Kiwior
- Date of birth: 15 February 2000 (age 26)
- Place of birth: Tychy, Poland
- Height: 1.89 m (6 ft 2 in)
- Positions: Centre-back; left-back

Team information
- Current team: Porto
- Number: 4

Youth career
- 2004–2007: PUKKS Chrzciciel Tychy
- 2007–2012: UKS Grom Tychy
- 2012–2016: GKS Tychy
- 2016–2018: Anderlecht

Senior career*
Years	Team	Apps	(Gls)
2018–2019	Železiarne Podbrezová	16	(1)
2019–2021	Žilina B	7	(0)
2019–2021	Žilina	46	(3)
2021–2023	Spezia	39	(0)
2023–2026	Arsenal	44	(3)
2025–2026	→ Porto (loan)	26	(0)
2026–	Porto	11	(1)

International career^{‡}
2016	Poland U16	4	(0)
2016–2017	Poland U17	4	(0)
2017	Poland U18	4	(1)
2018	Poland U19	10	(1)
2019	Poland U20	6	(0)
2020–2022	Poland U21	15	(1)
2022–	Poland	50	(2)
- * Club domestic league appearances and goals as of 23:20, 8 November 2026 (UTC) ‡ National team caps and goals as of 23:50, 14 November 2026 (UTC)

Jakub Piotr Kiwior (born 15 February 2000) is a Polish professional footballer who plays as a defender for Primeira Liga club Porto and the Poland national team.

Kiwior made his professional debut in 2018 for Slovak side Železiarne Podbrezová, before moving to Žilina in 2019 and Spezia in 2021. In January 2023, after making 39 appearances for Spezia, he transferred to Premier League club Arsenal in a deal reported to be worth £20 million. He moved to Porto on loan in August 2025 before joining them on a permanent basis the following year.

Kiwior has represented Poland for all youth levels U16 and up, and made his international debut on 11 June 2022. He was selected in the Polish squads for the 2022 World Cup and Euro 2024, starting in all matches in both tournaments.

== Club career ==
=== Youth career ===
Kiwior began playing football as a child with PUKKS Chrzciciel Tychy, before moving to UKS Grom Tychy in 2007. In 2012, he joined the GKS Tychy where he went up their youth levels and started training with their senior team. In 2016 he moved to the academy of the Belgian club Anderlecht where he finished his development, and stayed until 2018.

=== Železiarne Podbrezová ===
Kiwior moved to the Slovak club Železiarne Podbrezová in 2018, and made his senior and professional debut with them against Nitra in the Fortuna Liga on 16 February 2019. Kiwior played the entirety of the 3–1 victory at pod Zoborom.

=== Žilina ===
In August 2019, Kiwior's transfer to Žilina was announced. He made his debut in the yellow jersey on 10 August 2019 during an away fixture against Ružomberok. While Žilina grabbed a three-goal lead in the first half, Ružomberok scored two in the second period and hence Kiwior was brought on to secure the defence, as a replacement for Lukáš Jánošík. Šošoni managed to keep the 3–2 win and remained undefeated in the league.

Over a month later, in his second appearance, Kiwior had debuted in the starting XI against ViOn Zlaté Moravce. While Žilina's defence remained unbeaten, the strikers had failed to score and then match concluded in a goal-less tie. On 9 November Kiwior had recorded his first assist with Žilina. At Štadión pod Dubňom, Žilina was behind Ružomberok by two goals in the second half. Kiwior, a first-half replacement, managed to find Ján Bernát with a pass and narrow the score. Still, Žilina lost 2–1.

During the season, he also made sporadic appearances for the reserves competing in 2. Liga.

During the coronavirus pandemic, as Žilina had entered liquidation to survive financially and had consequently released 17 players, Kiwior remained unaffected.

=== Spezia Calcio ===
On 31 August 2021, Kiwior signed for Serie A side Spezia on a four-year deal. He made his debut against Inter Milan on 1 December 2021 as a starter and gave away a penalty after handball that converted into goal by Lautaro Martínez.

Kiwior was often deployed as defensive midfielder by his former manager Thiago Motta because of his ability to possess and control the ball.

=== Arsenal ===
On 23 January 2023, Kiwior moved to Arsenal on a long-term contract. He made his debut against Sporting on 9 March 2023 in the Europa League last 16 first leg as Arsenal drew 2–2. He made his home and Premier League debut as a substitute in Arsenal's 4–1 win against Crystal Palace on 19 March. He was handed his first start in a 3–1 win over Chelsea in early May after erratic performances from Arsenal's back line, owing to William Saliba's absence due to injury. He then started in the next game against Newcastle United, where a handball decision was overturned. He helped Arsenal maintain a clean sheet in that match and gained plaudits for his performance. On the final matchday of the 2022–23 season, he scored his first goal for Arsenal in a 5–0 win over Wolverhampton Wanderers.

In April 2025, Arsenal defender Gabriel Magalhães sustained a hamstring injury, leading Jakub Kiwior to replace him as a starting centre-back alongside William Saliba. Kiwior started in both legs of the UEFA Champions League quarter-finals against Real Madrid, where some described his great performances as flawless. On 23 April 2025, he scored in a 2–2 home draw against Crystal Palace in the Premier League.

=== Porto ===
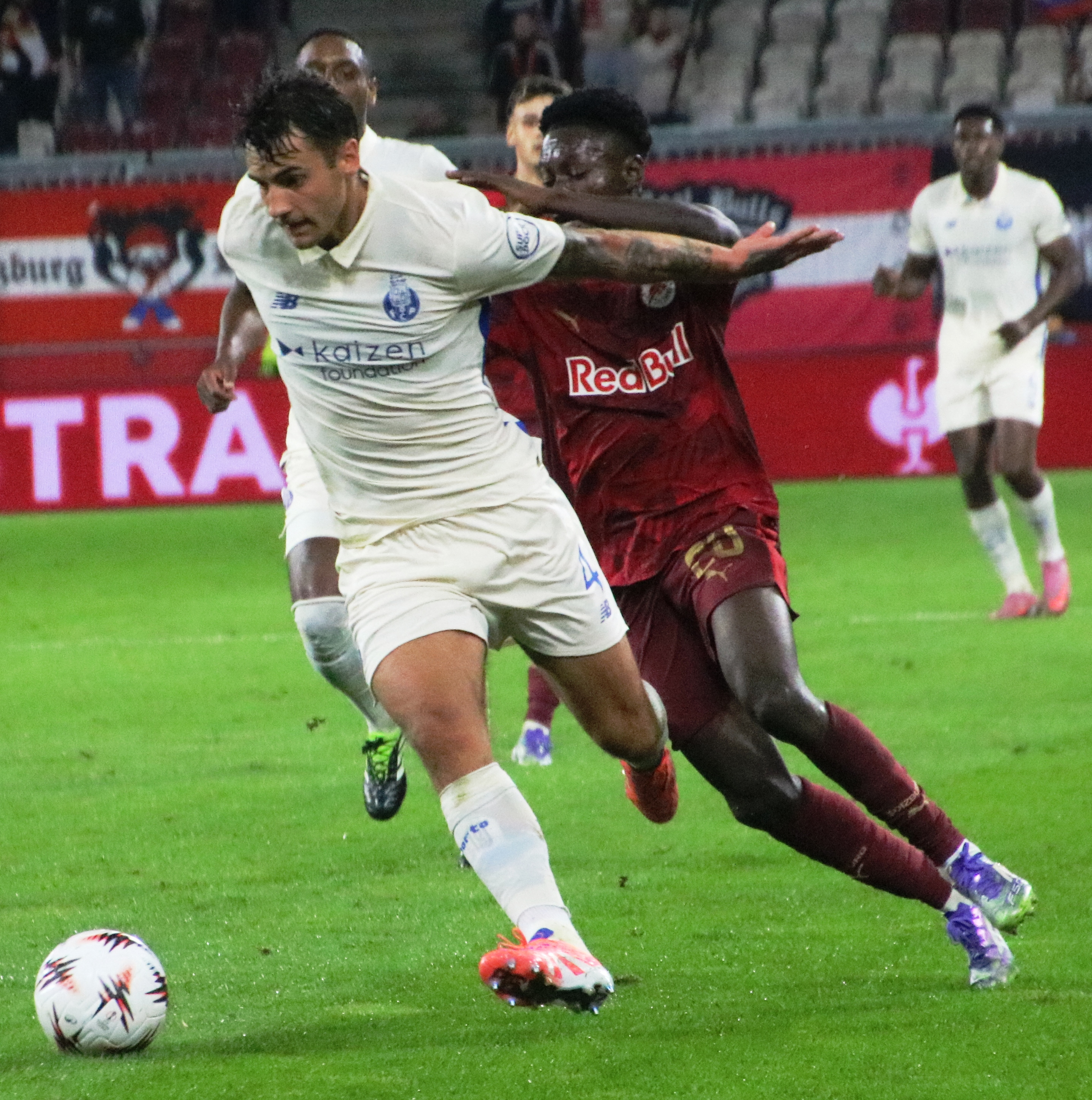
Kiwior (left) playing for Porto in 2025

On 1 September 2025, Kiwior signed for Primeira Liga club Porto on a season-long loan with an obligation to buy. He made his debut in a 1–0 Primeira Liga win against C.D. Nacional. On 5 May 2026, Porto triggered the buy option in Kiwior's loan deal: he joined the club permanently on 1 July for a €17m (£14.7m) fixed fee, with a potential €5m (£4.2m) add-ons. Arsenal retained a €2m (£1.7m) sell-on clause in the deal and €70 million (£60.52m) release clause was inserted into Kiwior's contract.

== International career ==
On 17 May 2022, Kiwior was called up to the Polish senior squad for two 2022–23 UEFA Nations League matches against Belgium and the Netherlands. He made his debut in the latter match on 11 June 2022, which ended in a 2–2 draw.

In November 2022, Kiwior was named in Poland's 26-man squad for the 2022 FIFA World Cup, starting in all four of Poland's matches during the tournament.

On 16 June 2023, Kiwior scored his first international goal in a friendly match against Germany, which Poland won 1–0.

In June 2024, he was selected to represent Poland in UEFA Euro 2024 in Germany.

== Personal life ==
Kiwior married Claudia Kowalczyk in 2023.

== Career statistics ==
=== Club ===
As of match played 8 November 2026

Appearances and goals by club, season and competition
Club	Season	League			National cup (Note: Includes Slovak Cup, Coppa Italia, FA Cup, Taça de Portugal)		League cup (Note: Includes EFL Cup, Taça da Liga)		Europe		Other		Total	
Club	Season	Division	Apps	Goals	Apps	Goals	Apps	Goals	Apps	Goals	Apps	Goals	Apps	Goals
Železiarne Podbrezová	2018–19	Slovak Super Liga	14	1	0	0	—		—		—		14	1
Železiarne Podbrezová	2019–20	Slovak 2. Liga	2	0	0	0	—		—		—		2	0
Železiarne Podbrezová	Total		16	1	0	0	—		—		—		16	1
Žilina B	2019–20	Slovak 2. Liga	4	0	—		—		—		—		4	0
Žilina B	2020–21	Slovak 2. Liga	3	0	—		—		—		—		3	0
Žilina B	Total		7	0	—		—		—		—		7	0
Žilina	2019–20	Slovak Super Liga	13	0	1	0	—		—		—		14	0
Žilina	2020–21	Slovak Super Liga	30	2	3	1	—		—		—		33	3
Žilina	2021–22	Slovak Super Liga	3	1	—		—		8 (Note: Appearances in UEFA Europa Conference League)	0	—		11	1
Žilina	Total		46	3	4	1	—		8	0	—		58	4
Spezia	2021–22	Serie A	22	0	1	0	—		—		—		23	0
Spezia	2022–23	Serie A	17	0	3	0	—		—		—		20	0
Spezia	Total		39	0	4	0	—		—		—		43	0
Arsenal	2022–23	Premier League	7	1	0	0	—		1 (Note: Appearance(s) in UEFA Europa League)	0	—		8	1
Arsenal	2023–24	Premier League	20	1	1	0	2	0	7 (Note: Appearances in UEFA Champions League)	0	0	0	30	1
Arsenal	2024–25	Premier League	17	1	0	0	3	0	10	0	—		30	1
Arsenal	Total		44	3	1	0	5	0	18	0	0	0	68	3
Porto (loan)	2025–26	Primeira Liga	26	0	5	0	0	0	8	0	—		39	0
Porto	2026–27	Primeira Liga	11	1	0	0	0	0	4	1	1 (Note: Appearance in Supertaça Cândido de Oliveira)	0	16	2
Porto	Porto total		37	1	5	0	0	0	12	1	1	0	55	2
Career total			189	8	14	1	5	0	38	1	1	0	247	10

=== International ===
As of match played 14 November 2026

Appearances and goals by national team and year
National team	Year	Apps	Goals
Poland	2022	9	0
Poland	2023	10	1
Poland	2024	12	0
Poland	2025	10	1
Poland	2026	9	0
Total		50	2

Scores and results list Poland's goal tally first, score column indicates score after each Kiwior goal.

List of international goals scored by Jakub Kiwior
No.	Date	Venue	Cap	Opponent	Score	Result	Competition
1	16 June 2023	Stadion Narodowy, Warsaw, Poland	12	Germany	1–0	1–0	Friendly
2	10 June 2025	Helsinki Olympic Stadium, Helsinki, Finland	35	Finland	1–2	1–2	2026 FIFA World Cup qualification

== Honours ==
Arsenal

- FA Community Shield: 2023

Porto

- Primeira Liga: 2025–26
- Supertaça Cândido de Oliveira: 2026

Individual

- Slovak First League Team of the Season: 2020–21
- Slovak First League U21 Team of the Season: 2020–21
- Primeira Liga Team of the Season: 2025–26
