= Riccardo Pecini =

Italian football manager (born 1978)

Riccardo Pecini (born 20 June 1978) is an Italian football manager who was CEO of Spezia.

== Early life ==
He attended Italian fourth and fifth division games with his father as a child.

== Career ==
Pecini worked as a scout for English Premier League side Tottenham. He is regarded to have played a role in Anthony Martial signing for Monaco and Milan Skriniar signing for Sampdoria, among other players. He held the role of scouting manager for UC Sampdoria, AC Milan, AS Monaco and was also sporting director at UC Sampdoria and Spezia Calcio. Today he is the CEO of the international scouting company called Scouting Department.

== Personal life ==
Pecini is a native of Fivizzano, Italy. He is the brother of Italian football agent Nicola Pecini.
