= 2025–26 Udinese Calcio season =

Udinese Calcio
2025–26 season
- Owner: Giampaolo Pozzo
- President: Franco Soldati
- Head coach: Kosta Runjaić
- Stadium: Stadio Friuli
- Serie A: 10th
- Coppa Italia: Round of 16
- Top goalscorer: League: Keinan Davis (10); All: Keinan Davis (10)
- Highest home attendance: 25,022 vs Juventus, Serie A, 14 March 2026
- Lowest home attendance: 6,686 vs Palermo, Coppa Italia, 23 September 2025
- Average home league attendance: 22,681
- Biggest win: 3–0 vs Fiorentina (H), Serie A, 2 March 2026; 3–0 vs AC Milan (A), Serie A, 11 April 2026
- Biggest defeat: 1–5 vs Fiorentina (A), Serie A, 21 December 2025
Home colours	Away colours	Third colours

The 2025–26 season was the 115th season of competitive association football played by Udinese Calcio, a professional football club based in Udine, Italy. It was the club's 31st consecutive season in Serie A, the top tier of Italian men's football, having finished 12th in the previous season, and the club also took part in the Coppa Italia, Italy's domestic cup competition.

Udinese finished 10th in Serie A, and were eliminated from the Coppa Italia at the round of 16 stage.

== Background and pre-season ==
Ahead of the 2024–25 season, Kosta Runjaić was appointed as the head coach of Udinese Calcio, and Udinese started the season well, with 10 points from the first four matches leaving the club top of the Serie A table. Though this form did not continue, and Udinese won just once in their last 11 Serie A matches, eventually finishing 12th with 44 points from 38 matches, it was described as a "strong opening campaign" for Runjaić at Udinese who had narrowly scraped survival in the previous season, and he was given a new two-year contract in summer 2025.

== Review ==
Young midfielder Arthur Atta was named the Serie A Rising Star of the Month for April 2026.

== Squad ==
Note: Flags indicate national team as defined under FIFA eligibility rules; some limited exceptions apply. Players may hold more than one non-FIFA nationality.

No.	Pos.	Nation	Player
1	GK	ITA	Alessandro Nunziante
6	MF	ESP	Oier Zarraga
7	FW	SEN	Idrissa Gueye (on loan from Metz)
8	MF	SWE	Jesper Karlström (captain)
9	FW	ENG	Keinan Davis
10	MF	ITA	Nicolò Zaniolo (on loan from Galatasaray)
11	DF	CIV	Hassane Kamara
13	DF	ITA	Nicolò Bertola
14	MF	FRA	Arthur Atta
15	FW	CIV	Vakoun Bayo
18	FW	POL	Adam Buksa
19	DF	NGR	Kingsley Ehizibue
20	DF	COL	Juan David Arizala

No.	Pos.	Nation	Player
22	DF	CRO	Branimir Mlačić
24	MF	POL	Jakub Piotrowski
27	DF	BEL	Christian Kabasele
28	DF	FRA	Oumar Solet
29	MF	FRA	Abdoulaye Camara
31	DF	DEN	Thomas Kristensen
32	MF	NED	Jurgen Ekkelenkamp
33	DF	ZIM	Jordan Zemura
38	MF	SCO	Lennon Miller
40	GK	NGR	Maduka Okoye
59	DF	ITA	Alessandro Zanoli (on loan from Napoli)
90	GK	ROU	Răzvan Sava
93	GK	ITA	Daniele Padelli

== Transfers ==
=== In ===
Date	Pos.	Player	From	Fee	Notes	Ref.
30 June 2025	DF	(Ivory Coast) Vakoun Bayo	(England) Watford	End of loan		
30 June 2025	DF	(Portugal) Leonardo Buta	(Portugal) Moreirense	End of loan		
30 June 2025	DF	(Cameroon) Enzo Ebosse	(Poland) Jagiellonia Białystok	End of loan		
30 June 2025	DF	(Portugal) Gonçalo Esteves	(Switzerland) Yverdon-Sport	End of loan		
30 June 2025	MF	(Italy) Marco Ballarini	(Italy) Lucchese	End of loan		
30 June 2025	FW	(Belgium) Sekou Diawara	(Italy) Lucchese	End of loan		
30 June 2025	FW	(Portugal) Vivaldo Semedo	(Portugal) Vizela	End of loan		
1 July 2025	DF	(Italy) Nicolò Bertola	(Italy) Spezia	Free		
1 July 2025	MF	(France) Arthur Atta	(France) Metz	€8,000,000	Loan transfer made permanent	
16 July 2025	MF	(France) Abdoulaye Camara	(France) Montpellier	€1,200,000		
16 July 2025	FW	(Denmark) Luca Kjerrumgaard	(Denmark) OB	€5,000,000		
29 July 2025	GK	(Italy) Alessandro Nunziante	(Italy) Benevento	€1,500,000		
2 August 2025	MF	(Poland) Jakub Piotrowski	(Bulgaria) Ludogorets Razgrad	€3,000,000		
5 August 2025	DF	(Georgia (country)) Saba Goglichidze	(Italy) Empoli	€4,000,000		
12 August 2025	MF	(Scotland) Lennon Miller	(Scotland) Motherwell	€5,500,000		
26 August 2025	FW	(Poland) Adam Buksa	(Denmark) Midtjylland	€5,000,000		

==== Loans in ====
Date	Pos.	Player	From	Fee	Notes	Ref.
1 September 2025	FW	(Senegal) Idrissa Gueye	(France) Metz	€4,000,000	Option to buy for €6,000,000	
1 September 2025	DF	(Italy) Alessandro Zanoli	(Italy) Napoli	Free	Option to buy for €5,000,000	
1 September 2025	FW	(Italy) Nicolò Zaniolo	(Turkey) Galatasaray	€2,500,000	Option to buy for €5,000,000	

==== Out ====
Date	Pos.	Player	To	Fee	Notes	Ref.
30 June 2025	DF	(France) Isaak Touré	(France) Lorient	End of loan		
1 July 2025	DF	(Slovenia) Jaka Bijol	(England) Leeds United	Undisclosed		
1 July 2025	DF	(Argentina) Nehuén Pérez	(Portugal) Porto	€13,250,000	Loan transfer made permanent	
1 July 2025	MF	(Serbia) Lazar Samardžić	(Italy) Atalanta	€16,600,000	Loan transfer made permanent	
5 July 2025	FW	(Portugal) Vivaldo Semedo	(England) Watford	Undisclosed		
8 August 2025	FW	(France) Florian Thauvin	(France) Lens	€6,000,000		
13 August 2025	DF	(Argentina) Lautaro Giannetti	(Turkey) Antalyaspor	Undisclosed		
1 September 2025	FW	(Chile) Alexis Sánchez	(Spain) Sevilla	Free	Contract terminated	
7 November 2025	FW	(Belgium) Sekou Diawara	(Switzerland) Zürich	Free	Joined U21 squad	

==== Loans out ====
Date	Pos.	Player	To	Fee	Notes	Ref.
30 June 2025	DF	(Republic of Ireland) James Abankwah	(England) Watford	Free	Loan extended	
15 July 2025	DF	(Cameroon) Enzo Ebosse	(Italy) Hellas Verona	Free	Obligation to buy for an undisclosed fee under certain conditions	
16 July 2025	FW	(Denmark) Luca Kjerrumgaard	(England) Watford	Free		
17 July 2025	GK	(Italy) Edoardo Piana	(Italy) Monopoli	Free		
17 July 2025	FW	(Italy) Lorenzo Lucca	(Italy) Napoli	€9,000,000	Option to buy for €26,000,000	
22 July 2025	DF	(Portugal) Gonçalo Esteves	(Portugal) Alverca	Free		
24 July 2025	DF	(Portugal) Leonardo Buta	(Spain) Eibar	Free	Option to buy for an undisclosed fee	
22 August 2025	FW	(Brazil) Brenner	(United States) Cincinnati	Free	Until 31 December 2025, option to buy for an undisclosed fee	
22 August 2025	MF	(Argentina) Martín Payero	(Italy) Cremonese	€1,000,000	Obligation to buy for €5,000,000 under certain conditions	
22 August 2025	FW	(Italy) Simone Pafundi	(Italy) Sampdoria	Free	Option to buy for €5,000,000	
26 August 2025	FW	(Chile) Damián Pizarro	(France) Le Havre	Free		
1 September 2025	DF	(Italy) Cristiano De Paoli	(Italy) Como	Free	Joined Primavera squad	
1 September 2025	MF	(Italy) Marco Ballarini	(Italy) Rimini	Free		
7 September 2025	MF	(Slovenia) David Pejičić	(Slovenia) Maribor	Free	Option to buy for an undisclosed fee	

=== Winter window ===
==== In ====
Date	Pos.	Player	From	Fee	Notes	Ref.
31 December 2025	FW	(Brazil) Brenner	(United States) Cincinnati	Free	End of loan	
6 January 2026	MF	(Colombia) Juan David Arizala	(Colombia) Independiente Medellín	€3,000,000		
13 January 2026	FW	(Chile) Damián Pizarro	(France) Le Havre	Free	Loan terminated early	
27 January 2026	DF	(Portugal) Gonçalo Esteves	(Portugal) Alverca	Free	Loan terminated early	
1 February 2026	DF	(Portugal) Leonardo Buta	(Spain) Eibar	Free	Loan terminated early	
2 February 2026	DF	(Cameroon) Enzo Ebosse	(Italy) Hellas Verona	Free	Loan terminated early	
2 February 2026	DF	(Croatia) Branimir Mlačić	(Croatia) Hajduk Split	€4,500,000		

==== Loans in ====
Date	Pos.	Player	From	Fee	Notes	Ref.

==== Out ====
Date	Pos.	Player	To	Fee	Notes	Ref.
23 January 2026	FW	(Italy) Lorenzo Lucca	(Italy) Napoli	€26,000,000	Loan transfer made permanent	
28 January 2026	FW	(Brazil) Brenner	(Brazil) Vasco da Gama	€5,000,000		
30 January 2026	DF	(Portugal) Gonçalo Esteves	(Italy) Catanzaro	Undisclosed		
2 February 2026	MF	(Italy) Marco Ballarini	(Italy) Virtus Verona	Free	Contract terminated	
2 February 2026	GK	(Italy) Gioele Venuti	(Italy) Sassuolo	Undisclosed	Joined Primavera squad	

==== Loans out ====
Date	Pos.	Player	To	Fee	Notes	Ref.
14 January 2026	DF	(Germany) Matteo Palma	(Italy) Sampdoria	Free		
15 January 2026	FW	(Spain) Iker Bravo	(Spain) Las Palmas	Free		
27 January 2026	FW	(Chile) Damián Pizarro	(Argentina) Racing	Free	Until 31 December 2026, option to buy for an undisclosed fee	
30 January 2026	MF	(Slovenia) Sandi Lovrić	(Italy) Hellas Verona	Free	Option to buy for €5,000,000	
2 February 2026	DF	(Portugal) Leonardo Buta	(Portugal) Rio Ave	Free	Option to buy for an undisclosed fee	
2 February 2026	MF	(Angola) Rui Modesto	(Italy) Palermo	Free	Option to buy for €3,000,000	
2 February 2026	DF	(Georgia (country)) Saba Goglichidze	(England) Watford	Free		
2 February 2026	DF	(Cameroon) Enzo Ebosse	(Italy) Torino	Free	Option to buy for €2,500,000	

=== Squad Statistics ===
Key:
‡ On loan from another club * First appearance(s) for the club

- # = Squad number
- Pos = Playing position
- P = Number of games played
- G = Number of goals scored
- GK = Goalkeeper
- DF = Defender
- MF = Midfielder
- FW = Forward
- = Yellow cards
- = Red cards
- † Permanent player left club during the season
- ¤ Loaned to another club for part or all of season

No.	Pos	Name	P	G	P	G	P	G	A yellow card	A red card	Notes
No.	Pos	Name	League		Coppa Italia		Total		Discipline		Notes
2	DF	Saba Goglichidze¤	8	0	1	0	9*	0	2	0	
4	FW	Sandi Lovrič¤	0	0	3	0	3	0	0	0	
6	MF	Oier Zarraga	24	0	2	0	26	0	2	0	
7	FW	Idrissa Gueye‡	19	1	2	0	21*	1	2	0	
8	MF	Jesper Karlström	36	1	2	0	38	1	6	0	
9	FW	Keinan Davis	30	10	2	0	32	10	5	0	
10	MF	Nicolò Zaniolo‡	32	5	2	1	34*	6	8	0	
11	DF	Hassane Kamara	26	0	1	0	27	0	5	0	
13	DF	Nicolò Bertola	28	0	1	0	29*	0	3	0	
14	MF	Arthur Atta	32	5	2	1	34	6	3	0	
15	FW	Vakoun Bayo	15	0	1	0	16*	0	0	0	
16	FW	Matteo Palma¤	0	0	3	0	3	0	1	0	
17	FW	Iker Bravo¤	8	1	2	1	10	2	1	0	
18	FW	Adam Buksa	25	3	2	0	27*	3	3	0	
19	DF	Kingsley Ehizibue	32	2	2	0	34	2	5	0	
20	DF	Juan Arizala	10	0	1	0	11	0	0	0	
22	DF	Branimir Mlačić	7	0	0	0	7	0	2	0	
24	MF	Jakub Piotrowski	33	1	2	0	35*	1	2	0	
27	DF	Christian Kabasele	30	3	1	0	31	3	6	1	
28	DF	Oumar Solet	35	3	3	0	38	3	1	0	
31	DF	Thomas Thiesson Kristensen	28	3	3	0	31	3	4	0	
32	MF	Jurgen Ekkelenkamp	31	5	2	0	33	5	1	0	
33	DF	Jordan Zemura	17	0	2	0	19	0	4	0	
38	MF	Lennon Miller	24	0	2	1	26*	1	4	0	
40	GK	Maduka Okoye	30	0	0	0	30	0	1	1	
59	DF	Alessandro Zanoli‡	19	1	1	0	20*	1	1	0	
90	GK	Răzvan Sava	7	0	3	0	10	0	1	0	

== Competitions ==
=== Serie A ===
==== League table ====
Pos	Team	Pld	W	D	L	GF	GA	GD	Pts
8	Bologna	38	16	8	14	49	46	+3	56
9	Lazio	38	14	12	12	41	40	+1	54
10	Udinese	38	14	8	16	45	48	−3	50
11	Sassuolo	38	14	7	17	46	50	−4	49
12	Torino	38	12	9	17	44	63	−19	45 (Note: Torino finished ahead of Parma on head-to-head goal difference: Parma 2–1 Torino, Torino 4–1 Parma.)

Source: Serie A
Rules for classification: 1) Points; 2) Tiebreaker for Champions team and third relegated team; 3) Head-to-head points; 4) Head-to-head goal difference; 5) Goal difference; 6) Goals scored; 7) Draw.
(Note: Head-to-head record is used only after all the matches between the teams in question have been played)

==== Match details ====
Serie A match details
Round	Date	Time	Opponent	Venue	Result F–A	Scorers	Attendance	Ref.
1	25 August 2025	18:30	Hellas Verona	H	1–1	Kristensen 53'	20,706	
2	31 August 2025	20:45	Inter Milan	A	2–1	Davis 29' pen., Atta 40'	70,796	
3	14 September 2025	15:00	Pisa	A	1–0	Bravo 14'	11,126	
4	20 September 2025	20:45	AC Milan	H	0–3		24,201	
5	28 September 2025	12:30	Sassuolo	A	1–3	Davis 55'	11,160	
6	5 October 2025	12:30	Cagliari	H	1–1	Kabasele 58'	18,159	
7	20 October 2025	20:45	Cremonese	A	1–1	Zaniolo 51'	10,860	
8	25 October 2025	15:00	Lecce	H	3–2	Karlström 16', Davis 37', Buksa 89'	21,441	
9	29 October 2025	18:30	Juventus	A	1–3	Zaniolo 45+1'	40,034	
10	1 November 2025	15:00	Atalanta	H	1–0	Zaniolo 40'	20,167	
11	9 November 2025	18:00	AS Roma	A	0–2		61,684	
12	22 November 2025	15:00	Bologna	H	0–3		23,756	
13	29 November 2025	15:00	Parma	A	2–0	Zaniolo 11', Davis 65' pen.	17,232	
14	8 December 2025	18:00	Genoa	H	1–2	Piotrowski 65'	23,356	
15	14 December 2025	15:00	Napoli	H	1–0	Ekkelenkamp 73'	24,502	
16	21 December 2025	18:00	Fiorentina	A	1–5	Solet 66'	18,405	
17	27 December 2025	18:00	Lazio	H	1–1	Davis 90+5'	24,460	
18	3 January 2026	12:30	Como 1907	A	0–1		11,914	
19	7 January 2026	20:45	Torino	A	2–1	Zaniolo 50', Ekkelenkamp 82'	17,982	
20	10 January 2026	15:00	Pisa	H	2–2	Kabasele 19', Davis 40' pen.	23,186	
21	17 January 2026	15:00	Inter Milan	H	0–1		24,929	
22	26 January 2026	20:45	Hellas Verona	A	3–1	Atta 23', Zanoli 58', Davis 66'	18,720	
23	2 February 2026	20:45	AS Roma	H	1–0	Ekkelenkamp 49'	23,598	
24	8 February 2026	15:00	Lecce	A	1–2	Solet 26' pen.	24,290	
25	15 February 2026	12:30	Sassuolo	H	1–2	Solet 10'	21,199	
26	23 February 2026	20:45	Bologna	A	0–1		23,238	
27	2 March 2026	20:45	Fiorentina	H	3–0	Kabasele 10', Davis 63' pen., Buksa 90+4'	18,265	
28	7 March 2026	18:00	Atalanta	A	2–2	Kristensen 39', Davis 55'	22,101	
29	14 March 2026	20:45	Juventus	H	0–1		25,022	
30	20 March 2026	20:45	Genoa	A	2–0	Ekkelenkamp 66', Davis 90+6'	30,896	
31	6 April 2026	12:30	Como 1907	H	0–0		24,347	
32	11 April 2026	18:00	AC Milan	A	3–0	Bartesaghi 27' o.g., Ekkelenkamp 37', Atta 71'	74,675	
33	18 April 2026	15:00	Parma	H	0–1		23,280	
34	27 April 2026	20:45	Lazio	A	3–3	Ehizibue 18', Atta 86', 90+3'	4,000	
35	2 May 2026	15:00	Torino	H	2–0	Ehizibue 45+1', Kristensen 51'	23,278	
36	9 May 2026	15:00	Cagliari	A	2–0	Buksa 56', Gueye 90+6'	16,120	
37	17 May 2026	20:45	Cremonese	H	0–1		23,079	
38	24 May 2026	18:00	Napoli	A	0–1		50,000	

=== Coppa Italia ===
Coppa Italia match details
Round	Date	Time	Opponent	Venue	Result F–A	Scorers	Attendance	Ref.
First round	18 August 2025	20:45	Carrarese	H	2–0	Atta 43', Bravo 59'	7,402	
Second round	23 September 2025	18:30	Palermo	H	2–1	Zaniolo 41', Miller 45'	6,686	
Round of 16	2 December 2025	21:00	Juventus	A	0–2		34,674	
