= 2024–25 Udinese Calcio season =

Udinese Calcio
2024–25 season
- Owner: Giampaolo Pozzo
- President: Franco Soldati
- Head coach: Kosta Runjaić
- Stadium: Stadio Friuli
- Serie A: 12th
- Coppa Italia: Second round
- Top goalscorer: League: Lorenzo Lucca (10); All: Lorenzo Lucca (12)
- Highest home attendance: 24,990 vs Juventus; 2 November 2024 (Serie A)
- Lowest home attendance: 4,940 vs Salernitana; 25 September 2024 (Coppa Italia)
- Average home league attendance: 21,714
- Biggest win: 4–0 vs Avellino; 9 August 2024 (Coppa Italia)
- Biggest defeat: 4–1 vs Como; 20 January 2025 (Serie A); 3–0 vs Roma; 22 September 2024 (Serie A)
Home colours	Away colours	Third colours

The 2024–25 season was the 114th season in the history of the Udinese Calcio as a football club, and it was also the 30th consecutive season in Serie A. In addition to the domestic league, the team participated in the Coppa Italia.

== Squad ==
As of 6 September 2024

Note: Flags indicate national team as defined under FIFA eligibility rules; some limited exceptions apply. Players may hold more than one non-FIFA nationality.

No.	Pos.	Nation	Player
4	DF	IRL	James Abankwah
5	MF	ARG	Martín Payero
6	MF	ESP	Oier Zarraga
7	FW	CHI	Alexis Sánchez
8	MF	SLO	Sandi Lovrić
9	FW	ENG	Keinan Davis
10	FW	FRA	Florian Thauvin (captain)
11	DF	CIV	Hassane Kamara
14	MF	FRA	Arthur Atta (on loan from Metz)
16	DF	GER	Matteo Palma
17	FW	ITA	Lorenzo Lucca
19	DF	NED	Kingsley Ehizibue
21	FW	ESP	Iker Bravo
22	FW	BRA	Brenner
23	DF	CMR	Enzo Ebosse
25	MF	SWE	Jesper Karlström

No.	Pos.	Nation	Player
27	DF	BEL	Christian Kabasele
29	DF	SLO	Jaka Bijol
30	DF	ARG	Lautaro Giannetti
31	DF	DEN	Thomas Kristensen
32	MF	NED	Jurgen Ekkelenkamp
33	DF	ZIM	Jordan Zemura
37	DF	FRA	Axel Guessand
40	GK	NGR	Maduka Okoye
66	GK	ITA	Edoardo Piana
77	DF	ANG	Rui Modesto
79	MF	SLO	David Pejičić
90	GK	ROU	Răzvan Sava
93	GK	ITA	Daniele Padelli
95	DF	FRA	Isaak Touré (on loan from Lorient)
99	FW	CHI	Damián Pizarro

== Transfers ==
=== In ===
Date	Pos.	Player	From	Fee	Notes	Ref.
30 June 2024	DF	(France) Axel Guessand	(Netherlands) Volendam	End of loan		
30 June 2024	GK	(Italy) Edoardo Piana	(Italy) Messina	End of loan		
1 July 2024	FW	(Italy) Lorenzo Lucca	(Italy) Pisa	€8,000,000	Loan transfer made permanent	
2 July 2024	FW	(Chile) Damián Pizarro	(Chile) Colo-Colo	€3,500,000		
31 July 2024	FW	(Spain) Iker Bravo	(Germany) Bayer Leverkusen	€600,000		
2 August 2024	DF	(Portugal) Gonçalo Esteves	(Portugal) Sporting CP B	Free		
3 August 2024	MF	(Sweden) Jesper Karlström	(Poland) Lech Poznań	€2,000,000		
6 August 2024	MF	(Netherlands) Jurgen Ekkelenkamp	(Belgium) Antwerp	€5,350,000		
10 August 2024	FW	(Chile) Alexis Sánchez	(Italy) Inter Milan	Free		
23 August 2024	GK	(Romania) Răzvan Sava	(Romania) CFR Cluj	€2,500,000		
29 August 2024	FW	(Ivory Coast) Vakoun Bayo	(England) Watford	Undisclosed		
30 August 2024	MF	(Angola) Rui Modesto	(Sweden) AIK	€2,000,000		

==== Loans in ====
Date	Pos.	Player	From	Fee	Notes	Ref.
30 August 2024	DF	(France) Isaak Touré	(France) Lorient	Free	Option to buy for €8,000,000	
30 August 2024	MF	(France) Arthur Atta	(France) Metz	Free	Option to buy for €8,000,000	

==== Out ====
Date	Pos.	Player	To	Fee	Notes	Ref.
30 June 2024	DF	(Portugal) João Ferreira	(England) Watford	End of loan		
1 July 2024	DF	(Morocco) Adam Masina	(Italy) Torino	€1,000,000	Loan transfer made permanent	
1 July 2024	MF	(Argentina) Roberto Pereyra	(Greece) AEK Athens	Free	End of contract	
2 July 2024	MF	(Brazil) Walace	(Brazil) Cruzeiro	€8,000,000		
30 July 2024	MF	(Brazil) Matheus Martins	(Brazil) Botafogo	€10,000,000		
27 August 2024	FW	(Nigeria) Isaac Success	(United Arab Emirates) Al Wasl	Free	Contract termination	
30 August 2024	DF	(Croatia) Filip Benković	Unattached	Free	Contract termination	
30 August 2024	GK	(Italy) Marco Silvestri	(Italy) Sampdoria	Undisclosed		
2 September 2024	DF	(Portugal) Leonardo Buta	(Portugal) Moreirense	Undisclosed		
3 September 2024	MF	(Portugal) Domingos Quina	(Cyprus) Pafos	€600,000		

==== Loans out ====
Date	Pos.	Player	To	Fee	Notes	Ref.
22 July 2024	DF	(Croatia) Antonio Tikvić	(England) Watford	Free		
18 August 2024	MF	(Serbia) Lazar Samardžić	(Italy) Atalanta	Free	Obligation to buy for €20,000,000	
29 August 2024	DF	(Portugal) Gonçalo Esteves	(Switzerland) Yverdon-Sport	Free	Option to buy for an undisclosed fee	
30 August 2024	FW	(Ivory Coast) Vakoun Bayo	(England) Watford	Free		
30 August 2024	DF	(Republic of Ireland) Festy Ebosele	(England) Watford	Free		
30 August 2024	DF	(Argentina) Nehuén Pérez	(Portugal) Porto	€4,080,000	Obligation to buy for €13,200,000	
2 September 2024	FW	(Portugal) Vivaldo Semedo	(Portugal) Vizela	Free		
6 September 2024	FW	(Belgium) Sekou Diawara	(Belgium) Francs Borains	Free		

=== Winter window ===
==== In ====
Date	Pos.	Player	From	Fee	Notes	Ref.
31 December 2024	MF	(Italy) Simone Pafundi	(Switzerland) Lausanne-Sport	Loan return		
2 January 2025	DF	(France) Oumar Solet	Unattached	Free		
9 January 2025	FW	(Belgium) Sekou Diawara	(Belgium) Francs Borains	Loan return		
10 January 2025	GK	(Norway) Egil Selvik	(Norway) Haugesund	Free		
30 January 2025	DF	(Republic of Ireland) Festy Ebosele	(England) Watford	Loan return		

==== Loans in ====
Date	Pos.	Player	From	Fee	Notes	Ref.

==== Out ====
Date	Pos.	Player	To	Fee	Notes	Ref.
16 January 2025	FW	(Spain) Gerard Deulofeu	Unattached	Free	Contract termination	
31 January 2025	DF	(Republic of Ireland) Festy Ebosele	(Turkey) İstanbul Başakşehir	Undisclosed		
31 January 2025	GK	(Norway) Egil Selvik	(England) Watford	Undisclosed		
4 March 2025	DF	(France) Axel Guessand	(Norway) Kristiansund	Undisclosed		

==== Loans out ====
Date	Pos.	Player	To	Fee	Notes	Ref.
16 January 2025	DF	(Republic of Ireland) James Abankwah	(England) Watford	Free		
29 January 2025	DF	(Cameroon) Enzo Ebosse	(Poland) Jagiellonia Białystok	Free		
1 February 2025	MF	(Italy) Marco Ballarini	(Italy) Lucchese	Free		
3 February 2025	FW	(Belgium) Sekou Diawara	(Italy) Lucchese	Free		

== Friendlies ==
=== Pre-season ===
The players begin training on 8 July, and the team remained in Udine until 18 July, when they travel to a training camp in Bad Kleinkirchheim, Austria.

13 July 2024 Friendly	Udinese (Italy)	5–0	(Slovenia) Bilje	Gorizia
19:00	Kabasele 25'; Lucca; Bonin 54'; Barbaro 71'; Guessand 90' (pen.)	Report		Stadium: Stadio Enzo Bearzot

17 July 2024 Friendly	Udinese (Italy)	4–1	(Croatia) Istra 1961	Codroipo
19:00	Brenner 19'; Lucca 45'; Thauvin 45+5'; Pejičić 64'	Report	Lawal 41'

20 July 2024 Friendly	Wolfsberger AC (Austria)	2–2	(Italy) Udinese	Austria
17:00	Gattermayer 74'; Kojzek 90+3'	Report	Lucca 33', 51'

27 July 2024 Friendly	Udinese (Italy)	2–3	(Germany) 1. FC Köln	St. Veit an der Glan, Austria
16:00 UTC+2	Success 8'; Lucca 25'		Downs 44'; Huseinbašić 45+2'; Ljubičić 68'

28 July 2024 Friendly	Udinese (Italy)	1–0	(Turkey) Konyaspor	Austria
16:00 UTC+2	Lovrić 47'

31 July 2024 Friendly	Udinese (Italy)	1–0	(Cyprus) Aris Limassol	Seeboden, Austria
18:00 UTC+2	Brenner 41'

3 August 2024 Friendly	Udinese (Italy)	0–1	(Saudi Arabia) Al-Hilal	Bad Kleinkirchheim, Austria
18:00				Stadium: Sportarena Bad Kleinkirchheim

== Competitions ==
=== Overall record ===
Competition	First match	Last match	Starting round	Record							
Competition	First match	Last match	Starting round	Pld	W	D	L	GF	GA	GD	Win %
Serie A	18 August 2024	24–25 May 2025	Matchday 1	27	11	6	10	34	37	−3	40.74
Coppa Italia	9 August 2024			2	2	0	0	7	1	+6	100.00
Total				29	13	6	10	41	38	+3	44.83

Last updated: 15 December 2024
Source: Soccerway

=== Serie A ===
==== League table ====
Pos	Team	Pld	W	D	L	GF	GA	GD	Pts
10	Como	38	13	10	15	49	52	−3	49
11	Torino	38	10	14	14	39	45	−6	44 (Note: Torino finished ahead of Udinese on head-to-head points: Udinese 2–2 Torino, Torino 2–0 Udinese.)
12	Udinese	38	12	8	18	41	56	−15	44
13	Genoa	38	10	13	15	37	49	−12	43
14	Hellas Verona	38	10	7	21	34	66	−32	37

Source: Serie A
Rules for classification: 1) Points; 2) Tiebreaker for Champions team and third relegated team; 3) Head-to-head points; 4) Head-to-head goal difference; 5) Goal difference; 6) Goals scored; 7) Draw.
(Note: Head-to-head record is used only after all the matches between the teams in question have been played)

==== Results summary ====
Overall								Home						Away					
Pld	W	D	L	GF	GA	GD	Pts	W	D	L	GF	GA	GD	W	D	L	GF	GA	GD
27	11	6	10	34	37	−3	39	7	2	5	19	17	+2	4	4	5	15	20	−5

Last updated: 2 March 2025.
Source: Serie A

==== Results by round ====
Round	1	2	3	4	5	6	7	8	9	10	11	12	13	14	15	16	17	18	19	20	21	22	23	24	25	26	27	28	29	30	31	32	33	34	35	36	37	38
Ground	A	H	H	A	A	H	H	A	H	A	H	A	A	H	A	H	A	H	A	H	A	H	H	A	H	A	H	A	H	A	A	H	A	H	A	H	A	H
Result	D	W	W	W	L	L	W	L	W	L	L	L	D	L	W	L	W	D	D	D	L	L	W	D	W	W	W											
Position	11	5	4	1	3	8	5	8	7	7	8	9	9	9	9	9	9	9	9	9	10	11	10	10	10	10	10											

Updated to match(es) played on 8 March 2025. Source: Serie A
A = Away; H = Home; W = Win; D = Draw; L = Loss

==== Matches ====
The match schedule was released on 4 July 2024.

18 August 2024 1	Bologna	1–1	Udinese	Bologna
18:30	Orsolini 57' (pen.)	Report	Okoye (yellow card) 32'; Giannetti (yellow card) 55', (goal) 68'; Thauvin (penalty missed) 68'; Ehizibue (yellow card) 81'; Lucca (yellow card) 90+5'	Stadium: Stadio Renato Dall'Ara; Attendance: 26,418; Referee: Maria Sole Ferrieri Caputi

24 August 2024 2	Udinese	2–1	Lazio	Udine
18:30	Lucca 5'; Giannetti (yellow card) 32'; Kamara (yellow card) 49' (yellow-red card) 68'; Thauvin 49'; Payero (yellow card) 62'	Report	Romagnoli (yellow card) 80'; Isaksen 90+5'	Stadium: Stadio Friuli; Attendance: 21,636; Referee: Daniele Doveri

1 September 2024 3	Udinese	1–0	Como	Udine
20:45	Brenner 43'; Bijol (yellow card) 68'; Zemura (yellow card) 90+1'; Bravo (yellow card) 90+9'	Report	Cutrone (penalty missed) 90+5'	Stadium: Stadio Friuli; Attendance: 20,804; Referee: Alessandro Prontera

16 September 2024 4	Parma	2–3	Udinese	Parma
18:30	Del Prato 2'; Bonny 43'; Keita (yellow card) 62' (yellow-red card) 73'	Report	Gianetti (yellow card) 38'; Lucca 49'; Thauvin 68', 77'; Ehizibue (yellow card) 84'; Davis (yellow card) 87'	Stadium: Stadio Ennio Tardini; Referee: Rosario Abisso

22 September 2024 5	Roma	3–0	Udinese	Rome
18:00 CEST (UTC+2)	Dovbyk 19'; Pisilli (yellow card) 31'; Dybala 49' (pen.); Baldanzi 70'; Cristante (yellow card) 80'	Report	Lucca (yellow card) 3'; Kristensen (yellow card) 39'	Stadium: Stadio Olimpico; Attendance: 63,499; Referee: Ermanno Feliciani

28 September 2024 6	Udinese	2–3	Inter Milan	Udine
15:00 CEST (UTC+2)	Karlström (yellow card) 26'; Kabasele 35'; Lucca 83'	Report	Frattesi 1'; L. Martínez 45+3', 47'	Stadium: Stadio Friuli; Attendance: 24,611; Referee: Juan Luca Sacchi

5 October 2024 7	Udinese	1–0	Lecce	Udine
15:00 CEST (UTC+2)	Ehizibue (yellow card) 28'; Kamara (yellow card) 72'; Zemura 75'	Report	Rebić (yellow card) 36'; Baschirotto (yellow card) 40'	Stadium: Stadio Friuli; Referee: Maurizio Mariani

19 October 2024 8	Milan	1–0	Udinese	Milan
18:00 CEST (UTC+2)	Chukwueze 13'; Reijnders (red card) 29'; Terracciano (yellow card) 49'; Maignan (yellow card) 89'	Report	Bijol (yellow card) 43'; Lucca (yellow card) 82'; Kamara (yellow card) 89'	Stadium: San Siro; Attendance: 71,018; Referee: Daniele Chiffi

25 October 2024 9	Udinese	2–0	Cagliari	Udine
18:30 CEST (UTC+2)	Lucca 38', (yellow card) 64'; Davis 78'; Touré (yellow card) 81'	Report	Makoumbou (yellow card) 5' (yellow-red card) 29'; Azzi (yellow card) 80'	Stadium: Stadio Friuli; Referee: Gianluca Manganiello

30 October 2024 10	Venezia	3–2	Udinese	Venice
18:30 CEST (UTC+2)	Nicolussi Caviglia (yellow card) 11', (goal) 56'; Pohjanpalo 41' (pen.), 86' (pen.); Haps (yellow card) 70'; Oristanio (yellow card) 90+6'	Report	Payero (yellow card) 17'; Lovrić 19'; Bravo 25'; Giannetti (yellow card) 40'; Touré (red card) 53'; Bijol (yellow card) 90+5'; Karlström (yellow card) 90+5'	Stadium: Stadio Pier Luigi Penzo; Referee: Davide Massa

2 November 2024 11	Udinese	0–2	Juventus	Udine
18:00 CET (UTC+1)	Bijol (yellow card) 47'; Davis (yellow card) 84'	Report	Okoye 19' (o.g.); Savona 37'; Locatelli (yellow card) 58'; Gatti (yellow card) 90+1'	Stadium: Stadio Friuli; Attendance: 24,990; Referee: Rosario Abisso

10 November 2024 12	Atalanta	2–1	Udinese	Bergamo
12:30 CET (UTC+1)	Pašalić 56'; Touré 60' (o.g.); Lookman (yellow card) 90+1'	Report	Kamara 45+3'; Touré (yellow card) 84'	Stadium: Gewiss Stadium; Attendance: 22,884; Referee: Marco Di Bello

25 November 2024 13	Empoli	1–1	Udinese	Empoli
18:30 CET (UTC+1)	Pellegri 23'; Henderson (yellow card) 37'; Ekong (yellow card) 85'; Anjorin (yellow card) 90+1'	Report	Kamara (yellow card) 8'; Bijol (yellow card) 27'; Davis 76'	Stadium: Stadio Carlo Castellani; Referee: Livio Marinelli

1 December 2024 14	Udinese	0–2	Genoa	Udine
12:30 CET (UTC+1)	Touré (red card) 4'; Kristensen (yellow card) 87'; Ebosse (yellow card) 90+2'	Report	Pinamonti 13'; Vásquez (yellow card) 42'; Badelj (yellow card) 45+3'; Giannetti 67' (o.g.); Martín (yellow card) 84'	Stadium: Stadio Friuli; Referee: Gianluca Aureliano

9 December 2024 15	Monza	1–2	Udinese	Monza
20:45 CET (UTC+1)	Kyriakopoulos 47'; Caprari (yellow card) 61'	Report	Lucca 6'; Karlström (yellow card) 70'; Bijol 70'; Bravo (yellow card) 90+2'	Stadium: Stadio Brianteo; Referee: Gianluca Manganiello

14 December 2024 16	Udinese	1–3	Napoli	Udine
18:00 CET (UTC+1)	Thauvin 22'; Atta (yellow card) 39'	Report	Lukaku 50'; Politano (yellow card) 67'; Giannetti 76' (o.g.); Zambo Anguissa 81'	Stadium: Stadio Friuli; Attendance: 19,981; Referee: Daniele Doveri

23 December 2024 17	Fiorentina	1–2	Udinese	Florence
18:30 CET (UTC+1)	Sottil (yellow card) 5'; Kean 8' (pen.); Kouamé (yellow card) 81'	Report	Zemura (yellow card) 38'; Kristensen (yellow card) 46'; Lucca 49'; Ehizibue (yellow card) 52'; Thauvin 57'; Sava (yellow card) 73'; Lovrić (yellow card) 90+5'	Stadium: Stadio Artemio Franchi; Attendance: 20,505; Referee: Matteo Marcenaro

29 December 2024 18	Udinese	2–2	Torino	Udine
12:30 CET (UTC+1)	Touré 41'; Lucca 49'; Abankwah (yellow card) 87'	Report	Adams 53'; Ricci 64'	Stadium: Stadio Friuli; Attendance: 23.082; Referee: Francesco Fourneau

4 January 2025 19	Hellas Verona	0–0	Udinese	Verona
20:45 CEST (UTC+2)	Serdar (yellow card) 29' (yellow-red card) 71'; Tchatchoua (yellow card) 82'	Report	Lucca (yellow card) 34'; Karlstrom (yellow card) 56'	Stadium: Stadio Marcantonio Bentegodi; Attendance: 23,663; Referee: Federico Dionisi

11 January 2025 20	Udinese	0–0	Atalanta	Udine
15:00 CET (UTC+1)	Lovrić (yellow card) 56'	Report	Scalvini (yellow card) 29'; Kolašinac (yellow card) 47'	Stadium: Stadio Friuli; Attendance: 21,727; Referee: Maurizio Mariani

20 January 2025 21	Como	4–1	Udinese	Como
20:45	Diao 5'; Strefezza 44'; Bijol 78' (o.g.); Paz 90'	Report	Payero 50'	Stadium: Stadio Giuseppe Sinigaglia; Attendance: 9.566; Referee: Francesco Cosso

26 January 2025 22	Udinese	1–2	Roma	Udine
15:00 CET (UTC+1)	Lucca 38'; Karlström (yellow card) 52'; Atta (yellow card) 80'	Report	Çelik (yellow card) 21'; Pellegrini (yellow card) 37', (goal) 50' (pen.); Dovbyk 64' (pen.)	Stadium: Stadio Friuli; Attendance: 23,853; Referee: Simone Sozza

1 February 2025 23	Udinese	3–2	Venezia	Udine
15:00 CET (UTC+1)	Lucca 47', (yellow card) 90+2'; Kamara (yellow card) 51'; Lovrič 52'; Bijol (yellow card) 75'; Bravo 84'	Report	Haps (yellow card) 50'; Caviglia 64'; Gytkjær 78'; Yeboah (yellow card) 90+1'; Bjarkason (yellow card) 90+2'	Stadium: Stadio Friuli; Attendance: 19.767; Referee: Maurizio Mariani

9 February 2025 24	Napoli	1–1	Udinese	Naples
20:45 CET (UTC+1)	McTominay 37'	Report	Ekkelenkamp 40'; Lucca (yellow card) 54'	Stadium: Stadio Diego Armando Maradona; Attendance: 50,938; Referee: Livio Marinelli

16 February 2025 25	Udinese	3–0	Empoli	Udine
15:00 CET (UTC+1)	Ekkelenkamp 19', 65'; Thauvin 90+1'	Report		Stadium: Stadio Friuli; Attendance: 19.539; Referee: Daniele Doveri

21 February 2025 26	Lecce	0–1	Udinese	Lecce
20:45 CET (UTC+1)	Berisha (yellow card) 65'	Report	Lucca (yellow card) 31', (goal) 32' (pen.); Lovrič (yellow card) 66'; Payero (yellow card) 67'	Stadium: Stadio Via del Mare; Attendance: 23.989; Referee: Kevin Bonacina

1 March 2025 27	Udinese	1–0	Parma	Udine
20:45 CET (UTC+1)	Thauvin 38' (pen.); Modesto (yellow card) 90+4'	Report	Almqvist (yellow card) 90+5'	Stadium: Stadio Friuli; Attendance: 20.430; Referee: Fabio Maresca

10 March 2025 28	Lazio	1–1	Udinese	Roma
20:45 CET (UTC+1)		Report		Stadium: Stadio Olimpico; Referee: Marco Piccinini

15 March 2025 29	Udinese	0–1	Hellas Verona	Udine
20:45 CET (UTC+1)				Stadium: Stadio Friuli

=== Coppa Italia ===
9 August 2024 First round	Udinese	4–0	Avellino	Udine
18:30	Brenner 41'; Thauvin 50' (pen.); Lucca 58'; Davis 87'			Stadium: Stadio Friuli; Referee: Gabriele Scatena

25 September 2024 Second round	Udinese	3–1	Salernitana	Udine
18:30	Bijol 20'; Lucca 44' (pen.); Ekkelenkamp 47'		Nwankwo 25'	Stadium: Stadio Friuli; Referee: Francesco Cosso

19 December 2024 Round of 16	Internazionale	2–0	Udinese	Milan
21:00 CET	Arnautović 30'; Asllani; 45+2'			Stadium: San Siro; Attendance: 53,376; Referee: Luca Massimi
