= Thomas Thiesson Kristensen =

Danish footballer (born 2002)

Personal information
- Full name: Thomas Thiesson Kristensen
- Date of birth: 17 January 2002 (age 24)
- Place of birth: Galten, Denmark
- Height: 1.98 m (6 ft 6 in)
- Position: Centre-back

Team information
- Current team: Atalanta (on loan from Udinese)
- Number: 31

Youth career
- 2007–2013: Galten FS
- 2013–2017: AGF
- 2017–2018: Vejle
- 2018–2021: AGF

Senior career*
Years	Team	Apps	(Gls)
2021–2023	AGF	39	(1)
2023–	Udinese	78	(4)
2026–	→ Atalanta (loan)	3	(0)

International career^{‡}
2020	Denmark U18	1	(0)
2020	Denmark U19	2	(0)
2022	Denmark U20	1	(0)
2022–2025	Denmark U21	15	(1)
- * Club domestic league appearances and goals as of 18 October 2026 ‡ National team caps and goals as of 19:12, 24 August 2025 (UTC)

Thomas Thiesson Kristensen (born 17 January 2002), also known as TK, is a Danish professional footballer who plays as a centre-back for Serie A club Atalanta, on loan from Udinese. Thomas is the brother of Kasper Kristensen.

== Club career ==
Kristensen joined AGF at the age of 11 in 2013 from Galten FS, where he had been since he was five years old. He later spent one season at Vejle Boldklub – in 2017–18 – before returning to AGF again.

In September 2020, Kristensen signed a three-year deal with AGF, which also saw him promoted to the first-team squad in the summer of 2021. He made his official debut for AGF on 16 May 2021 in a Danish Superliga game against Nordsjælland. Kristensen made a total of three appearances in the 2020–21 season. In June 2021, he was awarded the Martin Jørgensen Talent Award: an award named after AGF legend Martin Jørgensen.

After five appearances and one goal in the first half of the 2021–22 season, Kristensen signed a new contract until December 2026 with AGF on 1 December 2021.

On 1 September 2023, Kristensen signed a five-year contract with Udinese in Italy.

On 13 August 2026, Kristensen signed for fellow Serie A club Atalanta on a one-season loan deal with a conditional option to buy.

== Career statistics ==
As of match played 22 October 2026

Club statistics
Club	Season	League			National Cup		Continental		Other		Total	
Club	Season	Division	Apps	Goals	Apps	Goals	Apps	Goals	Apps	Goals	Apps	Goals
AGF	2020–21	Danish Superliga	2	0	0	0	—		1 (Note: Appearance in the 2020–21 Danish Superliga European play-offs)	0	3	0
AGF	2021–22	Danish Superliga	11	0	1	1	1 (Note: Appearance(s) in the UEFA Europa Conference League)	0	—		13	1
AGF	2022–23	Danish Superliga	20	1	2	0	—		—		22	1
AGF	2023–24	Danish Superliga	6	0	0	0	2	0	—		8	0
AGF	Total		39	1	3	1	3	0	1	0	46	2
Udinese	2023–24	Serie A	26	0	0	0	—		—		26	0
Udinese	2024–25	Serie A	24	1	0	0	—		—		24	1
Udinese	2025–26	Serie A	28	3	3	0	—		—		31	3
Udinese	Total		78	4	3	0	—		—		81	4
Atalanta (loan)	2026–27	Serie A	3	0	0	0	3	0	—		6	0
Career totals			120	5	6	1	6	0	1	0	133	6

== Personal life ==
Kristensen is the younger brother of Danish goalkeeper, Kasper Kristensen.
