= Maduka Okoye =

Nigerian footballer

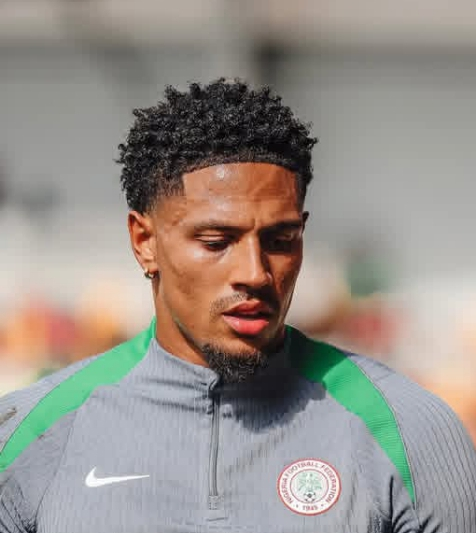
- Okoye with Nigeria in 2021

Personal information
- Full name: Maduka Emilio Okoye
- Date of birth: 28 August 1999 (age 27)
- Place of birth: Düsseldorf, Germany
- Height: 1.98 m (6 ft 6 in)
- Position: Goalkeeper

Team information
- Current team: Udinese
- Number: 40

Youth career
- 2007–2008: Fortuna Düsseldorf
- 2008–2009: Borussia Mönchengladbach
- 2009–2017: Bayer Leverkusen
- 2017–2018: Fortuna Düsseldorf

Senior career*
Years	Team	Apps	(Gls)
2017–2020	Fortuna Düsseldorf II	34	(0)
2020	Jong Sparta Rotterdam	2	(0)
2020–2022	Sparta Rotterdam	45	(0)
2022–2023	Watford	0	(0)
2022	→ Sparta Rotterdam (loan)	14	(0)
2023–	Udinese	88	(0)

International career^{‡}
2019–	Nigeria	21	(0)
- * Club domestic league appearances and goals as of 22 November 2026 ‡ National team caps and goals as of 10 June 2026

Maduka Emilio Okoye (born 28 August 1999) is a professional footballer who plays as a goalkeeper for Serie A club Udinese. Born in Germany, he plays for the Nigeria national team.

== Early life ==
Okoye was born in Düsseldorf, to an Igbo Nigerian father and a German mother.

== Club career ==
=== Fortuna Düsseldorf II ===
In the summer of 2017, he left the youth team of Bayer Leverkusen, where he had played since 2009 to join the youth team of Fortuna Düsseldorf.

On 14 October 2017, he made his professional debut in the Regionalliga West for Fortuna Düsseldorf II in a game against Wuppertaler SV, replacing the injured Max Schijns on the 43rd minute of the game. He finished the 2017/2018 season with 5 appearances, conceding just 1 goal and keeping 4 clean sheets, while his club finished the season in the 15th position with 36 points after 34 games, narrowly escaping relegation to Oberliga.

In the 2018/2019 season, he became the clubs regular goalkeeper. On 13 April 2019, he played his last match of the season, against SV Rödinghausen, after being replaced in goal for the next matches by goalkeeper Jannick Theissen. He finished the season with 15 appearances, conceding 25 goals and keeping 3 clean sheets. This time, his club did better than the previous season, finishing the season in the 12th position with 42 points after 34 games.

On 24 August 2019, he played his first match of the 2019/2020 season in a 2–1 home win against Schalke 04 II.

=== Sparta Rotterdam ===
In July 2020, Okoye signed for Eredivisie side Sparta Rotterdam on a free transfer. He was named Sparta's Player of the Season, keeping 10 clean sheets in 28 league games during the 2020/21 season. On 4 August 2021, Okoye signed a contract extension until 2025.

=== Watford ===
On 8 November 2021, it was announced that Okoye had agreed to join Premier League outfit Watford on a five-and-a-half-year deal for an undisclosed fee. Okoye joined Watford on 1 January 2022. The deal saw Okoye loaned back to Sparta Rotterdam until the end of the 2021–22 campaign. Okoye made his Watford debut on 23 August 2022 in a 2–0 home defeat to MK Dons in the second round of the EFL Cup.

=== Udinese ===
On 24 August 2023, Okoye signed for Serie A club Udinese for an undisclosed fee. In July 2025, he was suspended for two months by the Italian Football Federation following allegations of match-fixing during a game against Lazio in 2024, for which he was found to have violated standards of fairness but cleared of intent to fix the match itself.

== International career ==
On 30 November 2017, the coach of the Nigerian National Team, Gernot Rohr talked about his plans to invite Maduka to the Nigerian National Team before the 2018 World Cup, but the plan wasn't a success.

On 20 February 2019, during an interview conducted by German based Nigerian sports journalist, Oma Akatugba, Maduka hinted that he's open to invitation by the Nigerian National Team, and ever willing to wear the green and white.

On 22 February 2019, he was invited to the Nigerian U23 Team for the 2019 African U-23 Cup of Nations qualifier against Libya U-23 by Imama Amapakabo, the coach of the Nigeria U23 Team, but failed to make a debut, due to club engagement.

On 9 May 2019, Maduka was again invited to the Nigerian U23 Team for the 2019 African U-23 Cup of Nations qualifier against Sudan U-23. The football match was originally scheduled to take place between 3 and 11 June 2019, but was moved to September 2–10 2019 by CAF, the postponement was motivated by the closeness of the qualifying games to the 2019 Africa Cup of Nations which held from 21 June to 19 July 2019, in Egypt.

On 26 July 2019, the coach of the Nigerian National Team, Gernot Rohr, hinted that he is shifting his focus to Maduka as he looks to solve the goalkeeping crisis that has rocked his team since Carl Ikeme quit due to illness.

On 14 August 2019, Rohr invited Maduka for the friendly against Ukraine, played on 10 September 2019 in Dnipro-Arena.

On 13 October 2019, he made his international debut as a substitute in a friendly match against Brazil ending 1–1.

On 25 December 2021, he was shortlisted in 2021 AFCON Nations Cup by caretaker manager Eguavoen as part of the 28-man Nigeria Squad.

== Career statistics ==
=== Club ===
As of match played 22 November 2026

Appearances and goals by club, season and competition
Club	Season	League			National cup (Note: Includes KNVB Cup, FA Cup, Coppa Italia)		League cup (Note: Includes EFL Cup)		Other		Total	
Club	Season	Division	Apps	Goals	Apps	Goals	Apps	Goals	Apps	Goals	Apps	Goals
Fortuna Düsseldorf II	2017–18	Under 19 Bundesliga	13	0	—		—		—		13	0
Fortuna Düsseldorf II	2017–18	Regionalliga West	5	0	—		—		—		5	0
Fortuna Düsseldorf II	2018–19	Regionalliga West	15	0	—		—		—		15	0
Fortuna Düsseldorf II	2019–20	Regionalliga West	14	0	—		—		—		14	0
Fortuna Düsseldorf II	Total		34	0	—		—		—		34	0
Jong Sparta	2020–21	Tweede Divisie	2	0	—		—		—		2	0
Sparta Rotterdam	2020–21	Eredivisie	28	0	1	0	—		1 (Note: Appearance in Eredivisie Conference League play-offs)	0	30	0
Sparta Rotterdam	2021–22	Eredivisie	30	0	1	0	—		—		31	0
Sparta Rotterdam	Total		58	0	2	0	—		1	0	61	0
Watford	2022–23	Championship	0	0	1	0	1	0	—		2	0
Udinese	2023–24	Serie A	21	0	1	0	—		—		22	0
Udinese	2024–25	Serie A	25	0	1	0	—		—		26	0
Udinese	2025–26	Serie A	30	0	0	0	—		—		30	0
Udinese	2026–27	Serie A	12	0	1	0	—		—		13	0
Udinese	Total		88	0	3	0	—		—		91	0
Career total			195	0	6	0	1	0	1	0	203	0

=== International ===
As of 10 June 2026

Appearances and goals by national team and year
National team	Year	Apps	Goals
Nigeria
Nigeria	2019	1	0
Nigeria	2020	4	0
Nigeria	2021	8	0
Nigeria	2022	3	0
Nigeria	2024	1	0
Nigeria	2025	1	0
Nigeria	2026	3	0
Total		21	0

== Honours ==
Individual

- Eredivisie Team of the Month: March 2022
