= Arthur Atta =

French footballer (born 2003)

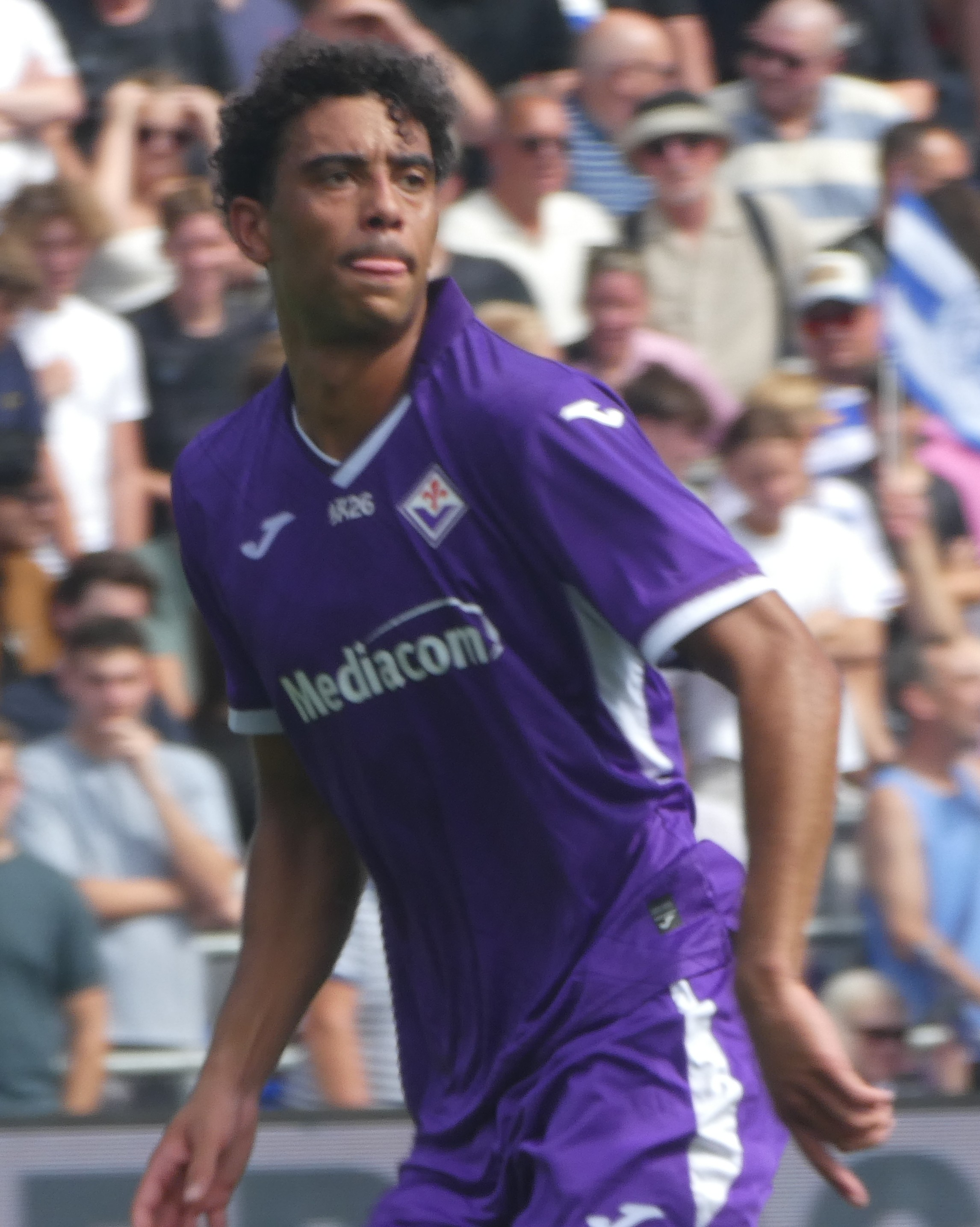
- Atta playing for Fiorentina in 2026

Personal information
- Date of birth: 14 January 2003 (age 23)
- Place of birth: Rennes, France
- Height: 1.89 m (6 ft 2 in)
- Position: Midfielder

Team information
- Current team: Fiorentina
- Number: 14

Youth career
- 2009–2011: AS Saint Jacques
- 2011–2018: Rennes
- 2018–2023: Metz

Senior career*
Years	Team	Apps	(Gls)
2021–2023	Metz B	16	(5)
2022–2025	Metz	39	(2)
2024–2025	→ Udinese (loan)	27	(0)
2025–2026	Udinese	32	(5)
2026–	Fiorentina	7	(0)

International career^{‡}
2023–2024	France U20	6	(0)
- * Club domestic league appearances and goals as of 20 September 2026 ‡ National team caps and goals as of 03:38, 22 July 2024 (UTC)

Arthur Atta (born 14 January 2003) is a French professional footballer who plays as a midfielder for Serie A club Fiorentina.

== Club career ==
Atta is a youth product of AS Saint Jacques, Rennes and Metz. As a youth he played as goalkeeper, winger and forward, before moving back to play as defensive midfielder. He was promoted to Metz's reserves in 2021. He made his professional debut with Metz in a 0–0 Ligue 2 tie with Niort on 26 December 2022, where he was named man of the match. On 25 January 2023, he signed his first professional contract with Metz until 2026.

=== Udinese ===
On 30 August 2024, Atta joined Udinese in Italy on loan with an option to buy. The following June he completed a permanent transfer to the club, signing a four-year contract.

=== Fiorentina ===
On July 11, 2026, Atta joined fellow Serie A side Fiorentina on a five-year contract.

== International career ==
Born in France, Atta is of Beninese descent. He played for the France U20s at the 2024 Maurice Revello Tournament.

== Career statistics ==
As of match played 20 September 2026

Appearances and goals by club, season and competition
Club	Season	League			National cup (Note: Includes Coupe de France, Coppa Italia)		Other		Total	
Club	Season	Division	Apps	Goals	Apps	Goals	Apps	Goals	Apps	Goals
Metz B	2021–22	CFA 2	2	0	—		—		2	0
Metz B	2022–23	CFA 2	11	3	—		—		11	3
Metz B	2023–24	National 3	3	2	—		—		3	2
Metz B	Total		16	5	—		—		16	5
Metz	2022–23	Ligue 2	16	1	1	0	—		17	1
Metz	2023–24	Ligue 1	21	1	1	0	2 (Note: Appearances in Ligue 1 relegation/promotion play-offs)	0	23	1
Metz	2024–25	Ligue 2	2	0	0	0	—		2	0
Metz	Total		39	2	1	0	2	0	42	2
Udinese (loan)	2024–25	Serie A	27	0	2	0	—		29	0
Udinese	2025–26	Serie A	32	5	2	1	—		34	6
Udinese	Udinese total		59	5	4	1	0	0	63	6
Fiorentina	2026–27	Serie A	5	0	1	0	—		6	0
Career total			119	12	7	1	1	0	127	13

== Honours ==
Individual

- Serie A Rising Star of the Month: April 2026
