= 2023–24 Spezia Calcio season =

Spezia Calcio
2023–24 season
- Manager: Massimiliano Alvini (until 14 November); Luca D'Angelo (from 15 November)
- Stadium: Stadio Alberto Picco
- Serie B: 15th
- Coppa Italia: Round of 32

The 2023–24 season was Spezia Calcio's 118th season in existence, and the club's first season in the second division of Italian football. In addition to the domestic league, Spezia participated in this season's edition of the Coppa Italia. The season covered the period from 1 July 2023 to 30 June 2024.

== Players ==
=== First-team squad ===
As of 1 September 2023

Note: Flags indicate national team as defined under FIFA eligibility rules; some limited exceptions apply. Players may hold more than one non-FIFA nationality.

No.	Pos.	Nation	Player
1	GK	NED	Jeroen Zoet
2	DF	POL	Przemysław Wiśniewski
4	DF	POR	João Moutinho
5	DF	ITA	Laurens Serpe
7	FW	ITA	Salvatore Elia
8	MF	SWE	Albin Ekdal
9	FW	ITA	Francesco Pio Esposito (on loan from Inter)
10	MF	ITA	Salvatore Esposito
11	FW	SVN	Tio Cipot
13	DF	POL	Arkadiusz Reca
15	DF	ITA	Niccolò Pietra
17	MF	POL	Szymon Żurkowski
19	FW	LVA	Raimonds Krollis
21	MF	ITA	Giovanni Corradini
23	DF	GER	Lukas Mühl

No.	Pos.	Nation	Player
24	FW	ITA	Luca Moro (on loan from Sassuolo)
25	MF	ITA	Filippo Bandinelli
26	DF	ALB	Christian Cugnata
27	DF	FRA	Kelvin Amian
29	MF	ITA	Francesco Cassata (on loan from Genoa)
33	DF	GEO	Iva Gelashvili (on loan from Dinamo Batumi)
40	GK	BIH	Petar Zovko
43	DF	GRE	Dimitrios Nikolaou
48	MF	ITA	Mirko Antonucci
55	DF	BUL	Petko Hristov
69	GK	POL	Bartłomiej Drągowski
77	DF	ITA	Nicolò Bertola
80	MF	ITA	Rachid Kouda
99	FW	ITA	Daniele Verde

=== Out on loan ===
Note: Flags indicate national team as defined under FIFA eligibility rules; some limited exceptions apply. Players may hold more than one non-FIFA nationality.

No.	Pos.	Nation	Player
—	DF	ESP	Salva Ferrer (at Anorthosis until 30 June 2024)
—	DF	ITA	Simone Bastoni (at Empoli until 30 June 2024)
—	DF	ITA	Simone Giorgeschi (at Pro Sesto until 30 June 2024)
—	DF	SWE	Emil Holm (at Atalanta until 30 June 2024)

No.	Pos.	Nation	Player
—	DF	ITA	Gianluca Scremin (at Lumezzane until 30 June 2024)
—	MF	DEN	Julius Beck (at AGF until 30 June 2024)
—	FW	SVK	David Strelec (at Slovan Bratislava until 30 June 2024)

== Competitions ==
=== Overview ===
Competition	First match	Last match	Starting round	Record							
Competition	First match	Last match	Starting round	Pld	W	D	L	GF	GA	GD	Win %
Serie B	19 August 2023	10 May 2024	Matchday 1	35	7	16	12	31	46	−15	20.00
Coppa Italia	14 August 2023		Round of 64	0	0	0	0	0	0	+0	—
Total				35	7	16	12	31	46	−15	20.00

Last updated: 27 April 2024
Source: Competitions

=== Serie B ===
==== League table ====
Pos	Team	Pld	W	D	L	GF	GA	GD	Pts	Promotion, qualification or relegation
13	Pisa	38	11	13	14	51	54	−3	46 (Note: Pisa finished ahead of Cittadella on head-to-head points: Pisa 2–1 Cittadella, Cittadella 0–1 Pisa.)	
14	Cittadella	38	11	13	14	40	47	−7	46	
15	Spezia	38	9	17	12	36	49	−13	44	
16	Ternana (R)	38	11	10	17	43	50	−7	43	Qualification for relegation play-out
17	Bari (O)	38	8	17	13	38	49	−11	41 (Note: Bari finished ahead of Ascoli on head-to-head points: Bari 1–0 Ascoli, Ascoli 2–2 Bari.)	Qualification for relegation play-out

Source: Soccerway (in English)
Rules for classification: 1) Points; 2) Head-to-head points; 3) Head-to-head goal difference; 4) Goal difference; 5) Goals scored; 6) Draw.
(Note: Head-to-head record is used only after all the matches between the teams in question have been played)
(O) Play-off winners; (R) Relegated

==== Results summary ====
Overall								Home						Away					
Pld	W	D	L	GF	GA	GD	Pts	W	D	L	GF	GA	GD	W	D	L	GF	GA	GD
35	7	16	12	31	46	−15	37	4	8	5	15	16	−1	3	8	7	16	30	−14

Last updated: 27 April 2024.

==== Results by round ====
Round	1	2	3	4	5	6	7	8	9	10	11	12	13
Ground	A	A	A	H	A	H	H	A	H	A	H	A	H
Result	D	P	L	L	L	L	D	W	D	D	D	L	
Position													

Updated to match(es) played on 5 November 2023. Source:
A = Away; H = Home; W = Win; D = Draw; L = Loss

==== Matches ====
The league fixtures were unveiled on 11 July 2023.

20 August 2023 1	Südtirol	3–3	Spezia	Bolzano
CEST (UTC+2)				Stadium: Stadio Druso

30 August 2023 3	Catanzaro	3–0	Spezia	Catanzaro
CEST (UTC+2)				Stadium: Stadio Nicola Ceravolo

3 September 2023 4	Spezia	0–1	Como	La Spezia
CEST (UTC+2)				Stadium: Stadio Alberto Picco

15 September 2023 5	Venezia	1–0	Spezia	Venice
CEST (UTC+2)				Stadium: Stadio Pier Luigi Penzo

23 September 2023 6	Spezia	1–2	Reggiana	La Spezia
CEST (UTC+2)				Stadium: Stadio Alberto Picco

26 September 2023 7	Spezia	0–0	Brescia	La Spezia
CEST (UTC+2)				Stadium: Stadio Alberto Picco

30 September 2023 8	Feralpisalò	1–2	Spezia	Piacenza
CEST (UTC+2)				Stadium: Stadio Leonardo Garilli

8 October 2023 9	Spezia	0–0	Pisa	La Spezia
CEST (UTC+2)				Stadium: Stadio Alberto Picco

23 October 2023 10	Palermo	2–2	Spezia	Palermo
CEST (UTC+2)	Mancuso 73'; Štulac 90+14'		Reca 31'; F. Esposito 70'	Stadium: Stadio Renzo Barbera

28 October 2023 11	Spezia	0–0	Cosenza	La Spezia
CEST (UTC+2)				Stadium: Stadio Alberto Picco

5 November 2023 12	Cremonese	3–0	Spezia	Cremona
16:15 CET (UTC+1)	Sernicola 12'; Zanimacchia 29'; Coda 52'			Stadium: Stadio Giovanni Zini

8 November 2023 2	Lecco	0–0	Spezia	Lecco
18:30 CET (UTC+1)				Stadium: Stadio Rigamonti-Ceppi

12 November 2023 13	Spezia	2–2	Ternana	La Spezia
16:15 CEST (UTC+2)				Stadium: Stadio Alberto Picco

27 April 2024 35	Brescia	0–0	Spezia	Brescia
14:00 CEST (UTC+2)				Stadium: Stadio Mario Rigamonti; Referee: Gianluca Manganiello

10 May 2024 38	Spezia	v	Venezia	La Spezia
20:30				Stadium: Stadio Alberto Picco
