= Nicolò Bertola =

Italian footballer

Personal information
- Date of birth: 23 March 2003 (age 23)
- Place of birth: Carrara, Italy
- Height: 1.92 m (6 ft 4 in)
- Position: Centre-back

Team information
- Current team: Udinese
- Number: 13

Youth career
- 2006-2010: San Marco Avenza
- 2010–2021: Spezia

Senior career*
Years	Team	Apps	(Gls)
2021–2025	Spezia	46	(4)
2022–2023	→ Montevarchi (loan)	22	(1)
2025–	Udinese	28	(0)

International career^{‡}
2021–2022	Italy U19	2	(0)
2024–	Italy U21	7	(0)
- * Club domestic league appearances and goals as of 25 May 2026 ‡ National team caps and goals as of 1 April 2025

Nicolò Bertola (born 23 March 2003) is an Italian professional footballer who plays as a centre-back for Serie A club Udinese.

== Early life ==
Bertola was born in Carrara, the northernmost province of Tuscany. He began playing football from an early age, joining his local Scuola Calcio (football school) of San Marco Avenza at the age of three. From there, he joined the Spezia youth academy at the age of seven.

== Club career ==
Bertola progressed through the youth ranks of the Serie B club and earned himself the captain's armband for the under-17 team during the 2019–20 season, whilst playing his first Campionato Primavera 2 games, as the first team achieved its first-ever promotion to Serie A.

During the 2020–21 season, he was appointed captain of the Primavera (under-19 side). He also earned his first call-ups to the senior team under Vincenzo Italiano.

The following season—under Thiago Motta's management—he became a regular in the senior side and made his professional debut for Spezia on 16 December 2021, starting as a centre-back in a 2–0 Coppa Italia home loss to Lecce. Bertola was then ranked among's Italy most promising under-19.

On 31 August 2022, Bertola joined Aquila Montevarchi in Serie C on loan.

On 24 June 2025, Bertola signed a five-year contract with Udinese.

== International career ==
First called to the under-19 selection by Carmine Nunziata in August 2021, he made his debut during a 1–0 friendly home win against Albania. He was also selected for a second time by the head coach in February 2022.

== Style of play ==
Primarily a centre-back, he stands 1.93 m (6 ft 4 in). He began his youth career as a regista, or deep-lying playmaker, and later transitioned to defence. Journalists noted his playing style for his physical attributes and ability to build play from the back.

== Career statistics ==
=== Club ===
As of match played 29 November 2025

Appearances and goals by club, season and competition
Club	Season	League			Cup		Europe		Other		Total	
Club	Season	Division	Apps	Goals	Apps	Goals	Apps	Goals	Apps	Goals	Apps	Goals
Spezia	2021–22	Serie A	2	0	1	0	—		—		3	0
Spezia	2023–24	Serie B	16	1	1	0	—		—		17	1
Spezia	2023–24	Serie B	28	3	1	0	—		—		29	3
Spezia	Total		46	4	3	0	0	0	0	0	49	4
Montevarchi (loan)	2021–22	Serie C	22	1	1	0	—		—		23	1
Udinese	2025–26	Serie A	9	0	1	0	—		—		10	0
Career total			77	5	5	0	0	0	0	0	82	5

== Honours ==
- Serie B Footballer of the Year: 2024–25
