= Keinan Davis =

English footballer

Personal information
- Full name: Keinan Vincent Joseph Davis
- Date of birth: 13 February 1998 (age 28)
- Place of birth: Stevenage, England
- Height: 6 ft 3 in (1.91 m)
- Position: Forward

Team information
- Current team: Udinese
- Number: 9

Youth career
- 2014–2015: Stevenage
- 2015: Biggleswade Town
- 2015–2017: Aston Villa

Senior career*
Years	Team	Apps	(Gls)
2017–2023	Aston Villa	73	(3)
2022	→ Nottingham Forest (loan)	15	(5)
2022–2023	→ Watford (loan)	34	(7)
2023–	Udinese	65	(13)

International career
2017–2018	England U20	3	(2)
- * Club domestic league appearances and goals as of 19 September 2026

Keinan Vincent Joseph Davis (born 13 February 1998) is an English professional footballer who plays as a forward for Serie A club Udinese.

Following youth spells at Stevenage and Biggleswade Town, Davis moved to the Aston Villa Academy in December 2015 aged 17, making his first-team debut for the club just over a year later against Tottenham Hotspur in the FA Cup in January 2017. Having played in a role in Aston Villa's promotion back to the Premier League in the 2018–19 season, he played on loan at EFL Championship sides Nottingham Forest and Watford, helping the former win the 2021–22 Championship play-offs.

Davis has previously represented England at under-20 level, earning 3 caps and scoring twice.

== Club career ==
=== Early career ===
Davis grew up in Stevenage and went to The Nobel School. He started his football career within the Stevenage F.C. academy but was released by coach Darren Sarll in 2015. Keinan was then picked up by Biggleswade Town under-18 coach Dave Northfield.

=== Aston Villa ===
In December 2015, following a four-week trial after being scouted in a friendly between Biggleswade Town Under-18s and an Aston Villa youth side, Davis signed for Aston Villa on an 18-month professional contract.

Following a calendar year in the Aston Villa U21 side, manager Steve Bruce gave Davis his Villa debut on 8 January 2017, coming off the bench against Tottenham Hotspur in the FA Cup, Villa lost 2–0. Davis was given his league debut on 14 January 2017 against Wolverhampton Wanderers. Davis scored his first professional goal away to Barnsley on 16 September 2017.

On 22 September 2020, Davis extended his contract with the Villans, keeping him with the club until 2024. On 25 April 2021, Davis scored his first Premier League goal, an injury time equaliser against West Bromwich Albion.

==== Nottingham Forest (loan) ====
On 1 January 2022, Davis joined Championship side Nottingham Forest on loan for the rest of the season. He made his Forest debut on 9 January, in a 1–0 FA Cup victory over Arsenal. Davis got his first goal for Nottingham Forest on 25 January, in a 3–0 victory over Barnsley. On 10 June, Forest announced that Davis would return to Aston Villa when his loan deal would expire.

==== Watford (loan) ====
On 13 August 2022, Watford announced the signing of Davis on a season-long loan. He scored his first goal for Watford in a 2–2 draw with Sunderland on 17 September. He scored his second in the 30th minute against Norwich City on 15 October, to make the score 2–0 to Slaven Bilić's side.

=== Udinese ===
On 1 September 2023, Davis left Aston Villa, joining Italian club Udinese permanently for an undisclosed fee on a four-year contract. Due to injury problems, it was not until 7 January 2024 when Davis made his Serie A debut as a late substitute in a 2–1 defeat to Lazio. On the final matchday of the 2023–24 season, he scored his first goal for the club in a 1–0 away win over Frosinone on 26 May, securing their survival in the top tier.

== International career ==
Born in England, Davis is of Jamaican descent. In March 2018, he scored for the England under-20 team in victories against Poland and Portugal.

== Career statistics ==
As of matches played 19 September 2026

Appearances and goals by club, season and competition
Club	Season	League			National cup (Note: Includes FA Cup, Coppa Italia)		League cup (Note: Includes EFL Cup)		Other		Total	
Club	Season	Division	Apps	Goals	Apps	Goals	Apps	Goals	Apps	Goals	Apps	Goals
Aston Villa	2016–17	Championship	6	0	1	0	0	0	—		7	0
Aston Villa	2017–18	Championship	28	2	1	1	1	0	0	0	30	3
Aston Villa	2018–19	Championship	5	0	1	0	0	0	1 (Note: Appearance(s) in Championship play-offs)	0	7	0
Aston Villa	2019–20	Premier League	18	0	0	0	5	1	—		23	1
Aston Villa	2020–21	Premier League	15	1	0	0	3	1	—		18	2
Aston Villa	2021–22	Premier League	1	0	0	0	0	0	1 (Note: Appearance in EFL Trophy)	1	2	1
Aston Villa	2022–23	Premier League	0	0	0	0	0	0	0	0	0	0
Aston Villa	Total		73	3	3	1	9	2	2	1	87	7
Nottingham Forest (loan)	2021–22	Championship	15	5	4	0	—		3	0	22	5
Watford (loan)	2022–23	Championship	34	7	0	0	0	0	—		34	7
Udinese	2023–24	Serie A	8	1	0	0	—		—		8	1
Udinese	2024–25	Serie A	23	2	2	1	—		—		25	3
Udinese	2025–26	Serie A	30	10	2	0	—		—		32	10
Udinese	2026–27	Serie A	4	0	1	1	—		—		5	1
Udinese	Total		65	13	5	2	0	0	0	0	66	15
Career total			187	28	11	3	9	2	5	1	213	35

== Honours ==
Aston Villa

- EFL Championship play-offs: 2019
- EFL Cup runner-up: 2019–20

Nottingham Forest

- EFL Championship play-offs: 2022
