= Iker Bravo =

Spanish footballer (born 2005)

Personal information
- Full name: Iker Bravo Solanilla
- Date of birth: 13 January 2005 (age 21)
- Place of birth: Sant Cugat del Vallès, Spain
- Height: 1.82 m (6 ft 0 in)
- Position: Forward

Team information
- Current team: Watford
- Number: 17

Youth career
- 2008–2010: Espluguenc
- 2010–2021: Barcelona

Senior career*
Years	Team	Apps	(Gls)
2021–2024	Bayer Leverkusen	1	(0)
2022–2024	→ Real Madrid B (loan)	22	(2)
2024–2026	Udinese	37	(3)
2026	→ Las Palmas (loan)	17	(0)
2026–	Watford	10	(1)

International career^{‡}
2019–2020	Spain U15	6	(1)
2021–2022	Spain U17	15	(10)
2021–2024	Spain U19	17	(3)
2025	Spain U20	5	(2)
2024–	Spain U21	9	(3)
Medal record
Men's football
Representing Spain
UEFA European Under-19 Championship
Winner	2024 Northern Ireland
- * Club domestic league appearances and goals as of 15 October 2026 ‡ National team caps and goals as of 7 October 2026 (UTC)

Iker Bravo Solanilla (born 13 January 2005) is a Spanish professional footballer who plays as a forward for EFL Championship club Watford.

== Club career ==
=== Bayer Leverkusen ===
Scouted by Barcelona at the age of five while playing for Espluguenc, Bravo joined La Masia and was part of their youth academy until signing with the German club Bayer Leverkusen on 28 July 2021. He made his professional debut with Leverkusen as a late substitute in a 2–1 DFB-Pokal loss to Karlsruher SC on 27 October 2021. At 16 years, 9 months and 15 days, Bravo was the youngest ever debutant for Leverkusen, taking the record from Florian Wirtz. On 7 November 2021, Bravo debuted for Bayer Leverkusen in the Bundesliga in a 1–1 tie with Hertha; at 16 years and 298 days he was briefly the second youngest ever Bundesliga debutant and youngest ever for Bayer Leverkusen, before being passed by his teammate Zidan Sertdemir in the same game.

==== Loan to Real Madrid Castilla ====
On 29 August 2022, Bravo was registered with Primera Federación's Real Madrid Castilla, on a 1-year loan from Leverkusen. On 4 September, Bravo was called up for Real Madrid's squad for the UEFA Champions League match against Celtic. On 17 September, Bravo scored his first goal for Real Madrid Castilla, winning the match against Sanse by 5–1. On June 11, 2023, Bravo was instrumental in Castilla's remarkable 3-0 turnaround against Barcelona Atlètic, scoring one of the goals that propelled them into the promotion playoff final against Eldense, competing for a spot in the Segunda División.

On 17 June 2024, Bravo's loan to Real Madrid was terminated with immediate effect, and he returned to Bayer Leverkusen.

=== Udinese ===
On 31 July 2024, Bravo signed a four-year contract with Serie A club Udinese. Later that year, on 30 October, he recorded his first goal and assist in a 3–2 defeat against Venezia.

==== Loan to Las Palmas ====
On 15 January 2026, Bravo was loaned to Segunda División club Las Palmas until the end of the season.

=== Watford ===
On 24 June 2026, Bravo was bought by English Championship side Watford for an undisclosed fee from Udinese. He scored on his EFL Championship debut on 16 August 2026 against Southampton.

== International career ==
Bravo is a youth international for Spain, having represented the Spain U15s and Spain U17s.

== Career statistics ==
=== Club ===
As of match played 16 August 2026

Appearances and goals by club, season and competition
Club	Season	League			National cup (Note: Includes DFB-Pokal, Coppa Italia)		Europe		Other		Total	
Club	Season	Division	Apps	Goals	Apps	Goals	Apps	Goals	Apps	Goals	Apps	Goals
Bayer Leverkusen	2021–22	Bundesliga	1	0	1	0	0	0	0	0	2	0
Real Madrid Castilla (loan)	2022–23	Primera División RFEF	22	2	—		—		3 (Note: Appearances in Primera Federación play-offs)	1	25	3
Udinese	2024–25	Serie A	29	2	2	0	—		—		31	2
Udinese	2025–26	Serie A	8	1	2	1	—		—		10	2
Udinese	Total		37	3	4	1	—		—		41	4
Las Palmas (loan)	2025–26	Segunda División	17	0	—		—		2 (Note: Appearances in Segunda División play-offs)	0	19	0
Watford	2026–27	Championship	1	1	0	0	—		1 (Note: Appearance in EFL Cup)	0	2	1
Career total			78	6	5	1	0	0	6	1	89	8

== Honours ==
Spain U19

- UEFA European Under-19 Championship: 2024

Individual

- UEFA European Under-19 Championship Player of the Tournament: 2024
- UEFA European Under-19 Championship Team of the Tournament: 2024
