= 2023–24 CFR Cluj season =

CFR Cluj
2023–24 season
- Manager: Ovidiu Hoban (interim)
- Stadium: Stadionul Dr. Constantin Rădulescu
- Liga I: 2nd
- Cupa României: Quarter-finals
- UEFA Europa Conference League: Second qualifying round
- Top goalscorer: League: Philip Otele (18); All: Philip Otele (18)
- Average home league attendance: 6,247

The 2023–24 season was CFR Cluj's 117th season in existence and 20th consecutive in the Liga I. They also competed in the Cupa României and the UEFA Europa Conference League.

== Players ==
=== First-team squad ===
As of 3 January 2024

Note: Flags indicate national team as defined under FIFA eligibility rules; some limited exceptions apply. Players may hold more than one non-FIFA nationality.

No.	Pos.	Nation	Player
2	FW	BIH	Luka Juričić
3	DF	ISR	Ziv Morgan (on loan from Ironi Kiryat Shmona)
4	DF	ROU	Cristian Manea (3rd captain)
6	DF	ALB	Arlind Ajeti
8	MF	ROU	Robert Filip
10	MF	ROU	Ciprian Deac (Vice-captain)
17	FW	NGR	Philip Otele
18	MF	GHA	Isaac Nortey
19	DF	ROU	Vasile Mogoș
21	MF	ROU	Luca Mihai
22	FW	UKR	Yevhen Konoplyanka
27	DF	ROU	Matei Ilie
29	MF	CGO	Durel Avounou
30	FW	ROU	Daniel Bîrligea

No.	Pos.	Nation	Player
34	GK	ROU	Cristian Bălgrădean
40	MF	CRO	Lovro Cvek
42	DF	SLO	Matija Boben
44	DF	CRO	Anton Krešić (on loan from Rijeka)
45	DF	ROU	Mário Camora (Captain)
73	MF	CRO	Karlo Muhar (4th captain)
76	MF	ROU	Tudor Lucaci
77	MF	GRE	Panagiotis Tachtsidis
81	FW	MDA	Gheorghe Gondiu
82	MF	ROU	Alin Fică
89	GK	ROU	Otto Hindrich
90	GK	ROU	Răzvan Sava

=== Other players under contract ===
Note: Flags indicate national team as defined under FIFA eligibility rules; some limited exceptions apply. Players may hold more than one non-FIFA nationality.

No.	Pos.	Nation	Player
24	DF	KOS	Rion Zejnullahu

=== Out on loan ===
Note: Flags indicate national team as defined under FIFA eligibility rules; some limited exceptions apply. Players may hold more than one non-FIFA nationality.

No.	Pos.	Nation	Player
5	MF	CIV	Ricky Gnéba (to Chindia Târgoviște)
11	MF	ROU	Claudiu Petrila (to Rapid București)
12	GK	ROU	Mihai Pînzariu (to Bihor Oradea)
33	GK	ROU	Cătălin Căbuz (to Hermannstadt)
55	FW	GAM	Mustapha Jah (to Chindia Târgoviște)
71	DF	ROU	Andrei Peteleu (to Universitatea Cluj)
—	DF	ROU	Rareș Bălan (to Gloria Bistrița)

No.	Pos.	Nation	Player
—	DF	FRA	Laley Fofana (to CSU Alba Iulia)
—	MF	ROU	Sergiu Luca (to Gloria Bistrița)
—	MF	CRO	Josip Mihalić (to Argeș Pitești)
—	FW	GHA	Carl Davordzie (to Gloria Bistrița)
—	FW	ROU	Viktor Kun (to SCM Zalău)
—	FW	MLI	Moussa Samaké (to CSM Satu Mare)

== Transfers ==
=== In ===
Pos.	Player	Transferred from	Fee	Date	Source
MF	(Nigeria) Philip Otele	(Romania) UTA Arad	Free	1 July 2023	
MF	(Republic of the Congo) Durel Avounou	Unattached	Free	11 July 2023	
MF	(Greece) Panagiotis Tachtsidis	(United Arab Emirates) Khor Fakkan	Free	21 July 2023	
GK	(Romania) Cătălin Căbuz	(Romania) Hermannstadt	Free	24 August 2023	

=== Out ===
Pos.	Player	Transferred to	Fee	Date	Source

== Pre-season and friendlies ==
Win Draw Loss Fixtures

30 June 2023 Friendly	CFR Cluj	1–0	CSC Dumbrăvița

4 July 2023 Friendly	CFR Cluj	3–1	Brașov

8 July 2023 Friendly	CFR Cluj	3–1	Ceahlăul

13 August 2023 Friendly	CFR Cluj	3–2	Hermannstadt

== Competitions ==
=== Overall record ===
Competition	First match	Last match	Starting round	Final position	Record							
Competition	First match	Last match	Starting round	Final position	Pld	W	D	L	GF	GA	GD	Win %
Liga I	15 July 2023	9 March 2024	Matchday 1		17	9	5	3	32	18	+14	52.94
Cupa României	28 September 2023		Round of 16		2	1	1	0	4	2	+2	50.00
UEFA Europa Conference League	27 July 2023	3 August 2023	Second qualifying round	Second qualifying round	2	0	1	1	2	3	−1	0.00
Total					21	10	7	4	38	23	+15	47.62

Last updated: November 2023
Source: Soccerway

=== Liga I ===
==== League table ====
Pos	Team	Pld	W	D	L	GF	GA	GD	Pts	Qualification
1	FCSB	30	19	7	4	53	28	+25	64	Qualification to play-off round
2	Rapid București	30	15	10	5	55	32	+23	55	Qualification to play-off round
3	CFR Cluj	30	15	8	7	54	29	+25	53	Qualification to play-off round
4	Universitatea Craiova	30	13	10	7	47	38	+9	49	Qualification to play-off round
5	Farul Constanța	30	11	10	9	37	38	−1	43 (Note: Head to head points: Farul Constanța 6, Sepsi OSK 0)	Qualification to play-off round

Source: , Soccerway
Rules for classification: 1) Points; 2) Head-to-head points; 3) Head-to-head goal difference; 4) Head-to-head goals scored; 5) Goal difference; 6) Goals scored; 7) Play-off.

==== Results summary ====
Overall								Home						Away					
Pld	W	D	L	GF	GA	GD	Pts	W	D	L	GF	GA	GD	W	D	L	GF	GA	GD
0	0	0	0	0	0	0	0	0	0	0	0	0	0	0	0	0	0	0	0

Last updated: November 2023.
Source: Superliga

==== Results by round ====
Round	1
Ground	
Result	
Position	

Updated to match(es) played on November 2023. Source: Superliga
A = Away; H = Home; W = Win; D = Draw; L = Loss

==== Matches ====
15 July 2023	CFR Cluj	2–0	Politehnica Iași	Cluj-Napoca
EEST (UTC+2)				Stadium: Stadionul Anghel Iordănescu

21 July 2023	UTA Arad	1–3	CFR Cluj
--:-- EET (UTC+1)

30 July 2023	CFR Cluj	1–1	Universitatea Craiova	Cluj-Napoca
EEST (UTC+2)				Stadium: Stadionul Anghel Iordănescu

6 August 2023	FCSB	1–0	CFR Cluj
--:-- EET (UTC+1)

21 August 2023	Universitatea Cluj	3–4	CFR Cluj
--:-- EET (UTC+1)

26 August 2023	CFR Cluj	3–1	Botoșani	Cluj-Napoca
EEST (UTC+2)				Stadium: Stadionul Anghel Iordănescu

2 September 2023	Voluntari	1–4	CFR Cluj
--:-- EET (UTC+1)

18 September 2023	CFR Cluj	1–0	Petrolul Ploiești	Cluj-Napoca
EET (UTC+1)				Stadium: Stadionul Anghel Iordănescu

25 September 2023	Rapid București	3–1	CFR Cluj
--:-- EET (UTC+1)

1 October 2023	CFR Cluj	2–0	FC U Craiova 1948	Cluj-Napoca
EET (UTC+1)				Stadium: Stadionul Anghel Iordănescu

5 October 2023	CFR Cluj	3–0	Sepsi OSK	Cluj-Napoca
EET (UTC+1)				Stadium: Stadionul Anghel Iordănescu

8 October 2023	Dinamo București	1–1	CFR Cluj
--:-- EET (UTC+1)

23 October 2023	CFR Cluj	0–0	Oțelul Galați	Cluj-Napoca
EET (UTC+1)				Stadium: Stadionul Anghel Iordănescu

30 October 2023	CFR Cluj	3–1	Farul Constanța	Cluj-Napoca
EET (UTC+1)				Stadium: Stadionul Anghel Iordănescu

6 November 2023	Hermannstadt	1–0	CFR Cluj
--:-- EET (UTC+1)

11 November 2023	Politehnica Iași	3–3	CFR Cluj
--:-- EET (UTC+1)

25 November 2023	CFR Cluj	0–0	UTA Arad	Cluj-Napoca
EET (UTC+1)				Stadium: Stadionul Anghel Iordănescu

2 December 2023	Universitatea Craiova	v	CFR Cluj
20:30 EET (UTC+1)

10 December 2023	CFR Cluj	v	FCSB	Cluj-Napoca
19:00 EET (UTC+1)				Stadium: Stadionul Anghel Iordănescu

=== Cupa României ===
August 2023 Play-off round	v	CFR Cluj
EEST (UTC+2)

==== Group stage ====
2 November 2023	Universitatea Cluj	1–1	CFR Cluj
EET (UTC+1)

6 December 2023	Rapid București	v	CFR Cluj
EET (UTC+1)

=== UEFA Europa Conference League ===
==== Qualifying rounds ====
===== Second qualifying round =====
The draw for the second qualifying round was held on 21 June 2023.

27 July 2023 First leg	CFR Cluj (Romania)	1–1	(Turkey) Adana Demirspor	Cluj-Napoca, Romania
20:30 EEST (UTC+3)	Betancor 6'; Sava (yellow card) 64'; Krasniqi (yellow card) 88'; Bîrligea (yellow card) 89'	Report	Manev (yellow card) 51'; Gravillon (yellow card) 65'; Stambouli 77'; Rodrigues (yellow card) 90+6'	Stadium: Stadionul Dr. Constantin Rădulescu; Attendance: 9,847; Referee: Elchin Masiyev (Azerbaijan)

3 August 2023 Second leg	Adana Demirspor (Turkey)	2–1 (3–2 agg.)	(Romania) CFR Cluj	Adana, Turkey
21:00 TRT (UTC+3)	Svensson (yellow card) 21'; David 43'; Gravillon (red card) 63'; C. Ndiaye (yellow card) 65', (goal) 90+3'; Belhanda (yellow card) 90+10'	Report	Bîrligea (yellow card) 65'; Mogos 68' (pen.); Ajeti (yellow card) 78'; Cvek (yellow card) 90+2'; Tachtsidis (yellow card) 90+6'	Stadium: New Adana Stadium; Attendance: 22,256; Referee: Nathan Verboomen (Belgium)
