= Serie B Footballer of the Year =

Annual Italian Footballers' Association award

AIC Serie B Footballer of the Year
- Sport: Association football
- Competition: Serie B
- Awarded for: Young footballer considered to have performed the best in each given Serie B season
- Local name: Migliore giovane della Serie B AIC (Italian)
- Country: Italy
- Presented by: Italian Footballers' Association (AIC)

History
- First award: 2012
- Editions: 14
- First winner: (Italy) Stephan El Shaarawy (2011)
- Most wins: (Italy) Sandro Tonali (2 times)
- Most recent: (Italy) Nicolò Bertola (2025)
- Website: Official website

The AIC Serie B Young Footballer of the Year (Italian: Migliore giovane della Serie B AIC) is a yearly award organized by the Italian Footballers' Association (AIC) given to the young footballer who has been considered to have performed the best over the previous Serie B season.

The award is part of the Gran Galà del Calcio (formerly known as Oscar del Calcio) awards event.

== Winners ==
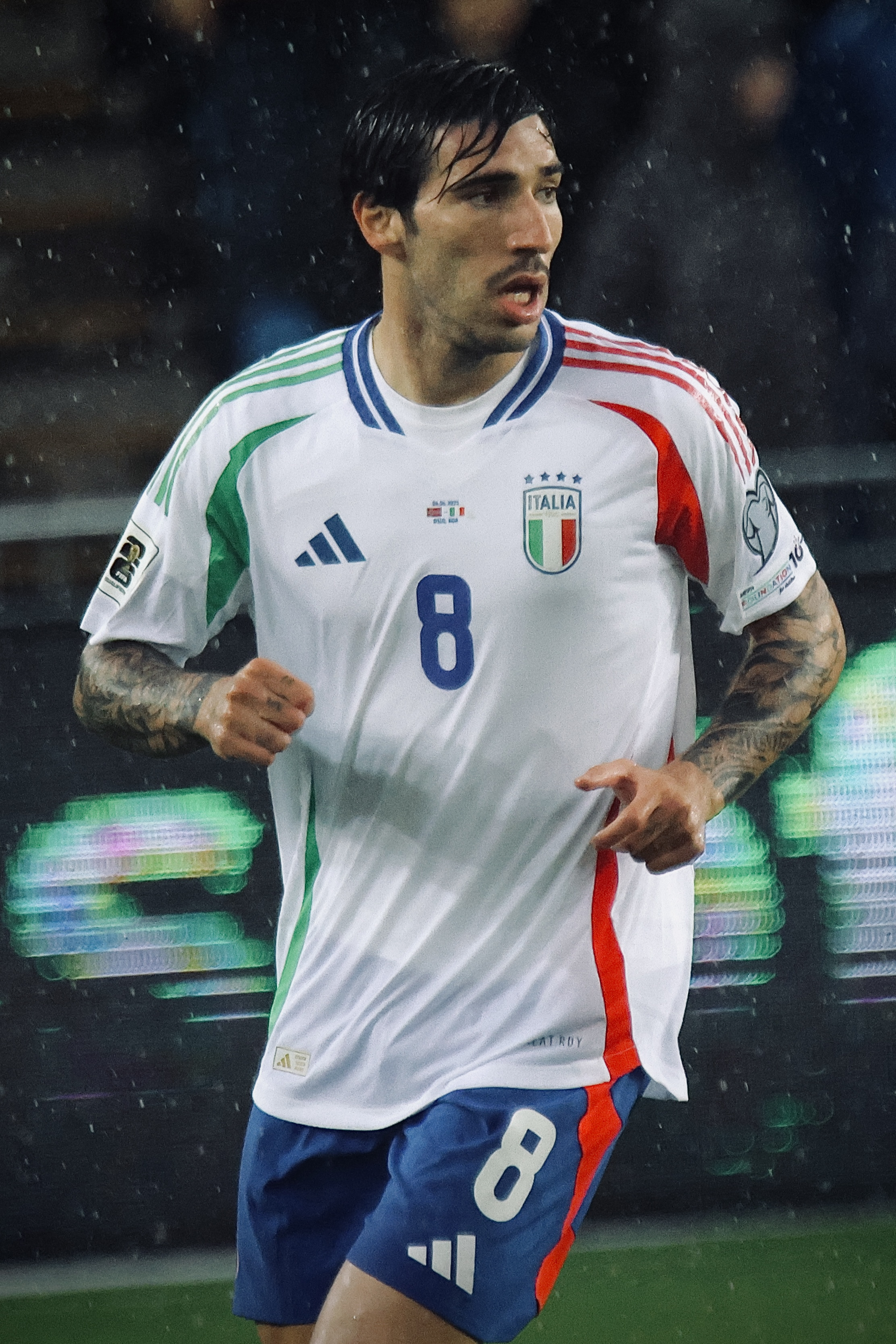
Sandro Tonali, the only player to have won the award twice

| Year | Player | Club | Ref(s) |
|---|---|---|---|
| 2010–11 | (Italy) Stephan El Shaarawy | Padova | |
| 2011–12 | (Italy) Lorenzo Insigne (Italy) Marco Verratti (Italy) Ciro Immobile | Pescara Pescara Pescara | |
| 2012–13 | (Italy) Domenico Berardi | Sassuolo | |
| 2013–14 | (Italy) Daniele Rugani | Empoli | |
| 2014–15 | (Morocco) Adam Masina | Bologna | |
| 2015–16 | (Italy) Leonardo Morosini | Brescia | |
| 2016–17 | (Italy) Alessio Cragno | Benevento | |
| 2017–18 | (Italy) Sandro Tonali | Brescia | |
| 2018–19 | (Italy) Sandro Tonali | Brescia | |
| 2020–21 | (Italy) Samuele Ricci | Empoli | |
| 2021–22 | (Italy) Federico Gatti | Frosinone | |
| 2022–23 | (Italy) Giovanni Fabbian | Reggina | |
| 2023–24 | (Italy) Pio Esposito | Spezia | |
| 2024–25 | (Italy) Nicolò Bertola | Spezia | |
| 2025–26 | (Italy) Mattia Liberali | Catanzaro | |

=== By club ===
| Club | Players |
|---|---|
| Brescia | 3 |
| Pescara | 3 |
| Empoli | 2 |
| Spezia | 2 |
| Benevento | 1 |
| Bologna | 1 |
| Catanzaro | 1 |
| Frosinone | 1 |
| Padova | 1 |
| Reggina | 1 |
| Sassuolo | 1 |

=== By country ===
| Country | Players |
|---|---|
| Italy | 16 |
| Morocco | 1 |

=== By position ===
| Position | Players |
|---|---|
| Midfielder | 7 |
| Forward | 5 |
| Defender | 4 |
| Goalkeeper | 1 |
