= Jurgen Ekkelenkamp =

Dutch footballer (born 2000)

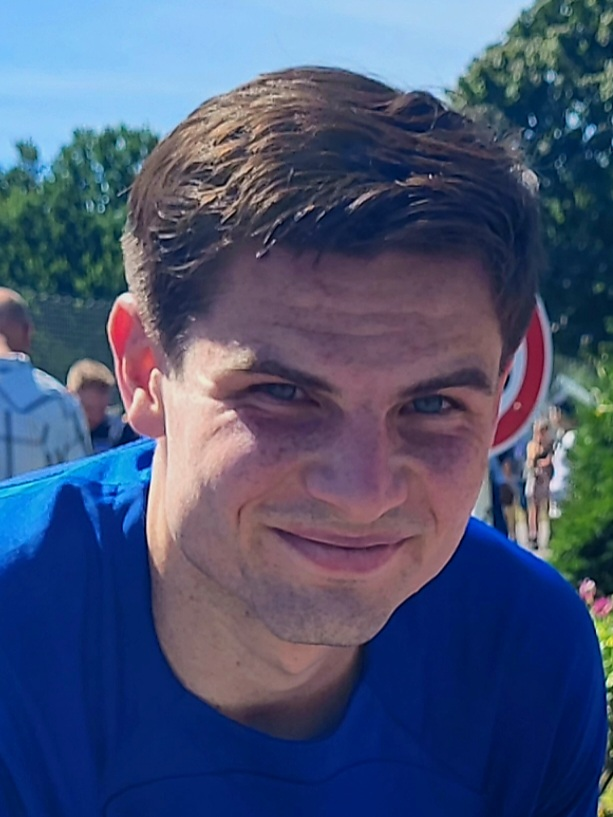
- Ekkelenkamp in 2022

Personal information
- Full name: Jurgen Peter Ekkelenkamp
- Date of birth: 5 April 2000 (age 26)
- Place of birth: Zeist, Netherlands
- Height: 1.88 m (6 ft 2 in)
- Position: Midfielder

Team information
- Current team: Udinese
- Number: 32

Youth career
- 2004–2013: Almere City
- 2013–2018: Ajax

Senior career*
Years	Team	Apps	(Gls)
2018–2021	Jong Ajax	49	(17)
2018–2021	Ajax	25	(4)
2021–2022	Hertha BSC	21	(3)
2022–2024	Antwerp	73	(11)
2024–	Udinese	71	(11)

International career^{‡}
2014–2015	Netherlands U15	5	(1)
2015–2016	Netherlands U16	10	(0)
2017–2018	Netherlands U18	3	(0)
2018–2019	Netherlands U19	9	(1)
2019	Netherlands U20	6	(3)
2020–2023	Netherlands U21	22	(7)
- * Club domestic league appearances and goals as of 15:24, 15 October 2026 (UTC) ‡ National team caps and goals as of 27 June 2023

Jurgen Peter Ekkelenkamp (born 5 April 2000) is a Dutch professional footballer who plays as a midfielder for Serie A club Udinese.

== Club career ==
=== Ajax ===
Ekkelenkamp made his professional debut in the Eerste Divisie for Jong Ajax on 9 April 2018 in a game against FC Den Bosch. His Eredivisie debut for Ajax followed on 19 April 2018 in the game against VVV-Venlo. On 10 April 2019, Ekkelenkamp made his UEFA Champions League debut, coming on in the 71st minute for Lasse Schöne in the quarter-final match against Juventus at the Johan Cruyff Arena. The match ended in a 1–1 draw, with Ekkelenkamp receiving cult-status in the Netherlands and the nickname 'Ronaldo-gooier' (English: Ronaldo thrower) after he committed a professional foul against Cristiano Ronaldo in the closing minutes of the match. Ajax later went on to defeat Juventus 2–1 in the return leg, making their first semi-final appearance in the tournament since 1997.

=== Hertha BSC ===
Ekkelenkamp joined Bundesliga side Hertha BSC on 27 August 2021. He made his debut on 17 September 2021, in a league game against SpVgg Greuther Fürth; he scored just one minute after being substituted in for Kevin-Prince Boateng, tying the score as the match ended in a 2–1 win for Hertha.

=== Antwerp ===
On 7 August 2022, Ekkelenkamp joined Belgian Pro League club Royal Antwerp.

In his first season at the club, he was part of the Royal Antwerp squad that won their first league title in 66 years.

=== Udinese ===
On 6 August 2024, Ekkelenkamp signed a five-season contract with Udinese in Italy.

== International career ==
Ekkelenkamp played 22 games (7 goals) for the Netherlands national under-21 football team and 9 for the U19s.

== Career statistics ==
=== Club ===
As of match played 12 October 2026

Appearances and goals by club, season and competition
Club	Season	League			National cup (Note: Includes KNVB Cup, DFB-Pokal, Belgian Cup)		Europe		Other		Total	
Club	Season	Division	Apps	Goals	Apps	Goals	Apps	Goals	Apps	Goals	Apps	Goals
Jong Ajax	2017–18	Eerste Divisie	1	1	–		–		–		1	1
Jong Ajax	2018–19	Eerste Divisie	21	4	–		–		–		21	4
Jong Ajax	2019–20	Eerste Divisie	21	11	–		–		–		21	11
Jong Ajax	2020–21	Eerste Divisie	6	1	–		–		–		6	1
Jong Ajax	Total		49	17	–		–		–		49	17
Ajax	2017–18	Eredivisie	3	0	–		–		–		3	0
Ajax	2018–19	Eredivisie	3	0	1	1	1 (Note: Appearance(s) in UEFA Champions League)	0	–		5	1
Ajax	2019–20	Eredivisie	4	1	3	1	1	0	0	0	8	2
Ajax	2020–21	Eredivisie	15	3	4	0	4	0	–		23	3
Ajax	2021–22	Eredivisie	0	0	0	0	0	0	1 (Note: Appearance in Johan Cruyff Shield)	0	1	0
Ajax	Total		25	4	8	2	6	0	1	0	40	6
Hertha BSC	2021–22	Bundesliga	21	3	1	0	–		–		22	3
Antwerp	2022–23	Belgian Pro League	33	6	5	0	2 (Note: Appearances in UEFA Europa Conference League)	0	–		40	6
Antwerp	2023–24	Belgian Pro League	39	5	6	0	6	0	0	0	51	5
Antwerp	2024–25	Belgian Pro League	1	0	0	0	0	0	0	0	1	0
Antwerp	Total		73	11	11	0	8	0	0	0	92	11
Udinese	2024–25	Serie A	34	3	2	1	–		–		36	4
Udinese	2025–26	Serie A	31	5	2	0	–		–		33	5
Udinese	2026–27	Serie A	6	3	1	0	–		–		7	3
Udinese	Total		71	11	5	1	0	0	0	0	76	12
Career total			239	46	27	3	14	0	1	0	279	49

== Honours ==
Jong Ajax

- Eerste Divisie: 2017–18

Ajax

- Eredivisie: 2018–19, 2020–21
- KNVB Cup: 2018–19, 2020–21
- Johan Cruyff Shield: 2019

Antwerp

- Belgian Pro League: 2022–23
- Belgian Cup: 2022–23
