= Pio Esposito =

Italian footballer (born 2005)

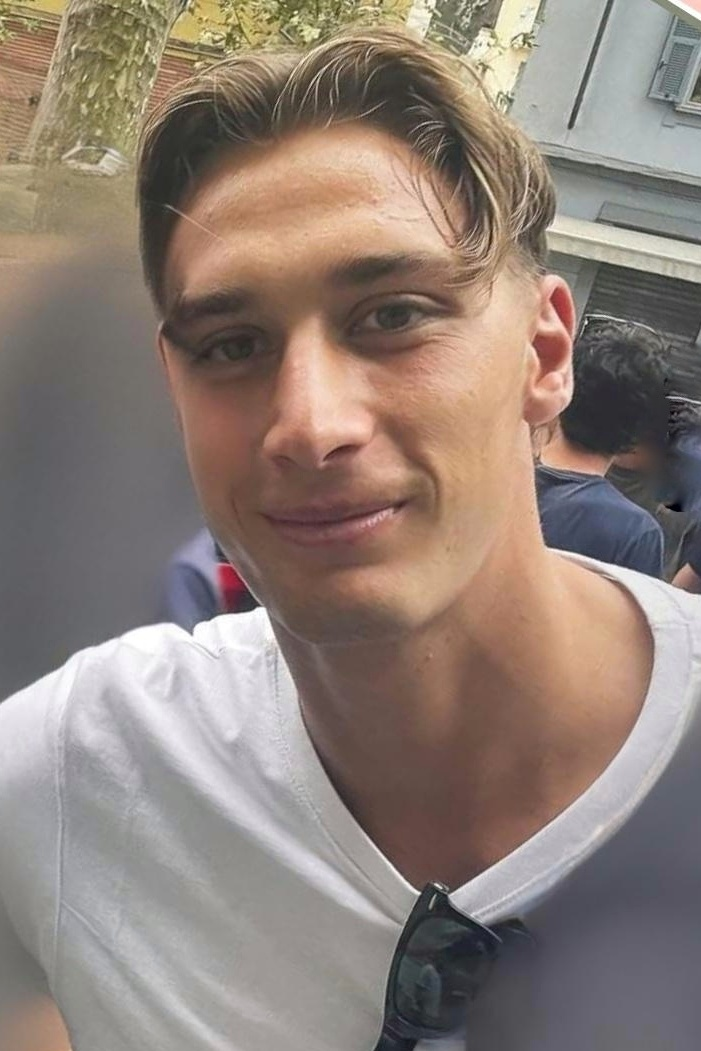
- Esposito in 2025

Personal information
- Full name: Francesco Pio Esposito
- Date of birth: 28 June 2005 (age 21)
- Place of birth: Castellammare di Stabia, Italy
- Height: 1.91 m (6 ft 3 in)
- Position: Striker

Team information
- Current team: Inter Milan
- Number: 94

Youth career
- 2011–2014: Brescia
- 2014–2023: Inter Milan

Senior career*
Years	Team	Apps	(Gls)
2023–	Inter Milan	47	(13)
2023–2025	→ Spezia (loan)	73	(20)

International career^{‡}
2022	Italy U17	4	(1)
2022–2023	Italy U18	5	(1)
2023	Italy U19	8	(2)
2023	Italy U20	6	(1)
2023–2024	Italy U21	11	(7)
2025–	Italy	15	(10)
Medal record
Men's football
Representing Italy
FIFA U-20 World Cup
Runner-up	2023 Argentina
UEFA European Under-19 Championship
Winner	2023 Malta
- * Club domestic league appearances and goals as of 22:22, 22 November 2026 (UTC) ‡ National team caps and goals as of 23:00, 15 November 2026 (UTC)

Francesco Pio Esposito (Italian pronunciation: [franˈtʃesko ˈpiːo eˈspɔːzito]; born 28 June 2005) is an Italian professional footballer who plays as a striker for Serie A club Inter Milan and the Italy national team.

== Club career ==
=== Inter Milan ===
Esposito is a youth product of Inter Milan. Despite being only 17 at that time, Esposito was a regular player for Inter Milan U19 whilst appearing in the 2022–23 UEFA Youth League as well.

On 9 July 2023, Esposito extended his contract with Inter until 2027.

==== Loan to Spezia ====
On 1 August 2023, he joined Serie B club Spezia on loan. Esposito made his professional debut on 14 August 2023, coming on as a substitute in the round of 64 of the Coppa Italia against Venezia. On 19 July 2024, Spezia announced the extension of Esposito's loan from Inter for one more year.

==== Return to Inter Milan ====
On 11 April 2025, Esposito extended his contract with Inter until 2030. Following the appointment of new manager Cristian Chivu, he was named as part of the Inter Milan squad for the 2025 FIFA Club World Cup. On 21 June, he made his debut as a substitute, replacing his brother Sebastiano Esposito in a 2–1 victory against Urawa Red Diamonds. On 26 June, he scored his first goal in a 2–0 victory against River Plate.

On 27 September 2025, Esposito scored his first Serie A goal for Inter Milan in a 2–0 away victory against Cagliari, converting from close range after a cross from Federico Dimarco.

== International career ==
=== Youth ===
Between May and June 2023, Esposito took part in the 2023 FIFA U-20 World Cup, which Italy ended as runners-up, and scored one goal during the tournament and playing also the final. One month later, in July, he was part of the Italy squad that won the 2023 UEFA European Under-19 Championship, scoring one goal as well. On 8 September 2023, Esposito made his debut with the Italy U21 in a 2025 UEFA European Under-21 Championship qualification against Latvia. On 5 September 2024, he scored four goals in the same tournament against San Marino, ending in a 7–0 victory for his country.

=== Senior ===
On 5 September 2025, Esposito debuted for the Italian senior team in a 2026 World Cup qualifier against Estonia – coming as a substitute in the 84th minute for Moise Kean – which ended in a 5–0 victory for the Italians.

== Personal life ==
Esposito is the younger brother of midfielder Salvatore and striker Sebastiano.

== Career statistics ==
=== Club ===
As of match played 22 November 2026

Appearances and goals by club, season and competition
Club	Season	League			Coppa Italia		Europe		Other		Total	
Club	Season	Division	Apps	Goals	Apps	Goals	Apps	Goals	Apps	Goals	Apps	Goals
Spezia (loan)	2023–24	Serie B	38	3	1	0	—		—		39	3
Spezia (loan)	2024–25	Serie B	35	17	1	0	—		4 (Note: Appearances in Serie B promotion play-offs)	2	40	19
Spezia (loan)	Total		73	20	2	0	—		4	2	79	22
Inter Milan	2024–25	Serie A	—		—		—		2 (Note: Appearances in FIFA Club World Cup)	1	2	1
Inter Milan	2025–26	Serie A	35	7	4	1	9 (Note: Appearances in UEFA Champions League)	2	0	0	48	10
Inter Milan	2026–27	Serie A	12	6	0	0	2	1	0	0	14	7
Inter Milan	Total		47	13	4	1	11	3	2	1	64	18
Career total			120	33	6	1	11	3	6	3	143	40

=== International ===
As of match played 15 November 2026

Appearances and goals by national team and year
National team	Year	Apps	Goals
Italy	2025	5	3
Italy	2026	10	7
Total		15	10

Scores and results list Italy's goal tally first, score column indicates score after each Esposito goal.

List of international goals scored by Pio Esposito
No.	Date	Venue	Cap	Opponent	Score	Result	Competition
1	11 October 2025	A. Le Coq Arena, Tallinn, Estonia	2	Estonia	3–0	3–1	2026 FIFA World Cup qualification
2	13 November 2025	Zimbru Stadium, Chișinău, Moldova	4	Moldova	2–0	2–0	2026 FIFA World Cup qualification
3	16 November 2025	San Siro, Milan, Italy	5	Norway	1–0	1–4	2026 FIFA World Cup qualification
4	3 June 2026	Stade de Luxembourg, Luxembourg City, Luxembourg	8	Luxembourg	1–0	1–0	Friendly
5	7 June 2026	Pankritio Stadium, Heraklion, Greece	9	Greece	1–0	1–0	Friendly
6	28 September 2026	Centennial Atatürk Stadium, Bursa, Turkey	11	Turkey	4–1	4–1	2026–27 UEFA Nations League A
7	5 October 2026	Stadio Renato Dall'Ara, Bologna, Italy	13	Turkey	3–1	3–1	2026–27 UEFA Nations League A
8	12 November 2026	San Siro, Milan, Italy	14	France	1–1	3–1	2026–27 UEFA Nations League A
9	12 November 2026	San Siro, Milan, Italy	14	France	3–1	3–1	2026–27 UEFA Nations League A
10	15 November 2026	King Baudouin Stadium, Brussels, Belgium	15	Belgium	1–0	1–4	2026–27 UEFA Nations League A

== Honours ==
Inter Milan

- Serie A: 2025–26
- Coppa Italia: 2025–26

Individual

- Best Italian Golden Boy: 2025
- Serie B Footballer of the Year: 2023–24
