= Alessandro Nunziante (footballer) =

Italian association football player

Personal information
- Date of birth: 14 March 2007 (age 19)
- Place of birth: Foggia, Italy
- Height: 1.93 m (6 ft 4 in)
- Position: Goalkeeper

Team information
- Current team: Arezzo (on loan from Udinese)
- Number: 14

Youth career
- –2023: Benevento

Senior career*
Years	Team	Apps	(Gls)
2023–2025	Benevento	31	(0)
2025–	Udinese	0	(0)
2026–	→ Arezzo (loan)	11	(0)

International career^{‡}
2022	Italy U15	1	(0)
2022–2023	Italy U16	7	(0)
2024	Italy U17	1	(0)
2025–	Italy U19	5	(0)
2025–	Italy U20	4	(0)
- * Club domestic league appearances and goals as of 24 May 2026 ‡ National team caps and goals as of 14 January 2026

Alessandro Nunziante (born 14 March 2007) is an Italian professional footballer who plays as a goalkeeper for Serie B club Arezzo, on loan from Udinese.

== Club career ==
Nunziante came through the youth academy of Benevento and was promoted to the senior team ahead of the 2023–24 Serie C season. He made 31 league appearances, keeping 9 clean sheets during his debut season, establishing himself as a first-choice goalkeeper.

On 29 July 2025, Nunziante signed a professional contract with Udinese until 30 June 2030.

== International career ==
Nunziante has represented Italy U17 and Italy U19 in UEFA youth competitions.

- Italy U17: 5 appearances, 0 goals
- Italy U19: 3 appearances, 0 goals

== Style of play ==
Nunziante, a tall and commanding goalkeeper, is known for his shot-stopping abilities and composure under pressure. He is also confident with playing the ball out from the back with his feet.

== Career statistics ==
Season	Club	Competition	Appearances	Clean Sheets
2024–25	Benevento	Serie C	31	9
