= Răzvan Sava =

Romanian footballer (born 2002)

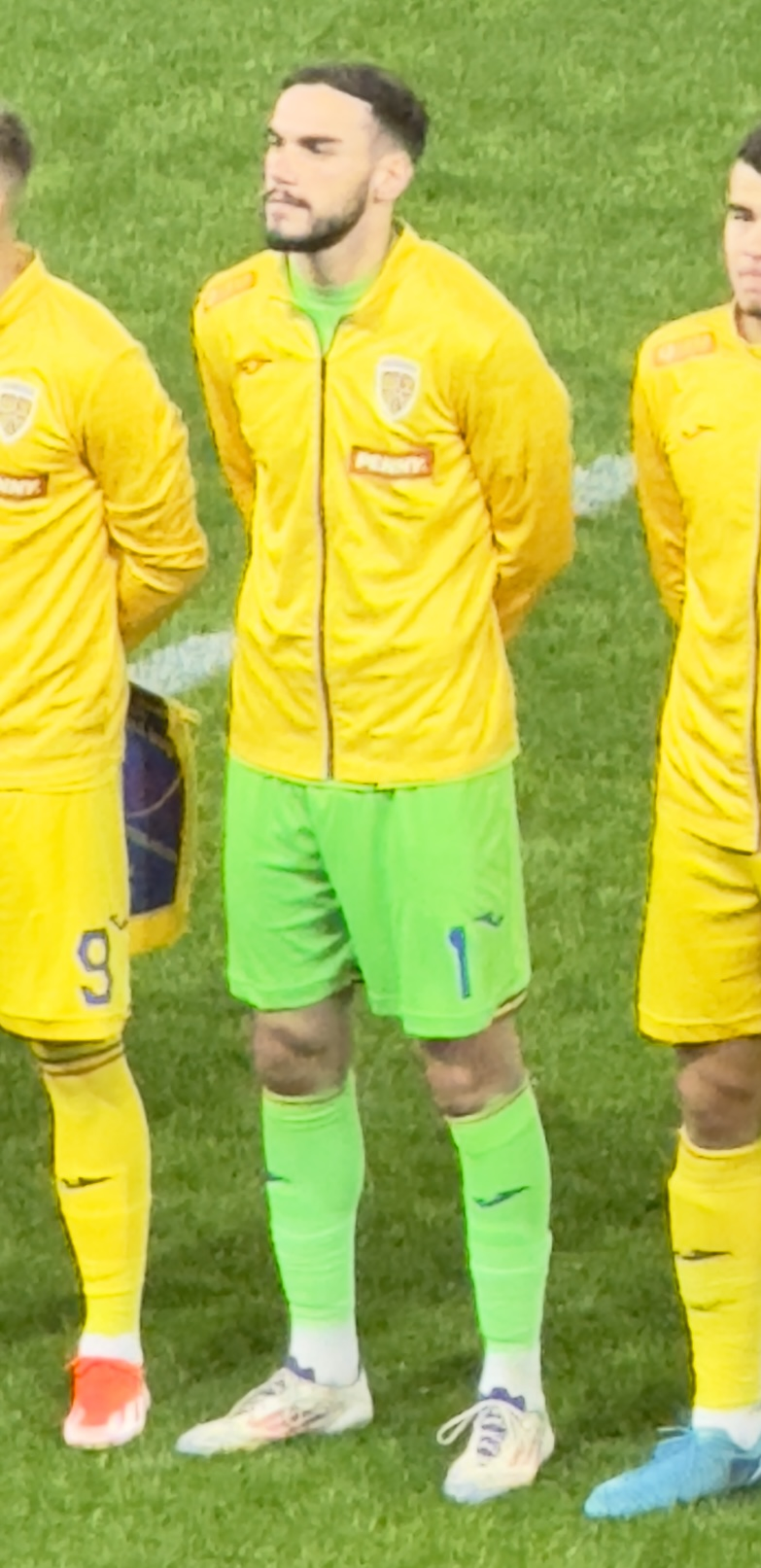
- Sava lining up for Romania U21 in October 2024.

Personal information
- Full name: Răzvan Sergiu Sava
- Date of birth: 21 June 2002 (age 24)
- Place of birth: Timișoara, Romania
- Height: 1.97 m (6 ft 6 in)
- Position: Goalkeeper

Team information
- Current team: Universitatea Craiova
- Number: 90

Youth career
- –2017: LPS Banatul Timișoara
- 2017–2018: Pro Sesto
- 2018–2020: Juventus
- 2019–2020: → Pescara (loan)
- 2020: → Lecce (loan)
- 2020–2022: Torino

Senior career*
Years	Team	Apps	(Gls)
2022–2024	CFR Cluj	48	(0)
2024–2026	Udinese	19	(0)
2026–	Universitatea Craiova	6	(0)

International career^{‡}
2018	Romania U16	2	(0)
2018–2019	Romania U17	8	(0)
2019	Romania U18	2	(0)
2021–2023	Romania U20	6	(0)
2023–2025	Romania U21	13	(0)
- * Club domestic league appearances and goals as of 23 August 2026 ‡ National team caps and goals as of 15 July 2025

Răzvan Sergiu Sava (Romanian pronunciation: [rəzˈvan ˈserd͡ʒju ˈsava]; born 21 June 2002) is a Romanian professional footballer who plays as a goalkeeper for Liga I club Universitatea Craiova and the Romania national team.

== Club career ==
=== Early career ===
Born in Timișoara, Sava left Romania in 2017 and spent his next years in the academies of Italian clubs Pro Sesto, Juventus, Pescara, Lecce, and Torino, respectively.

=== CFR Cluj ===
On 28 January 2022, Sava returned to Romania by signing a contract with four-time defending champions CFR Cluj. He made his senior debut on 14 August that year, in a 1–0 home Liga I loss to Botoșani.

After the departure of Simone Scuffet, Sava became the starting goalkeeper of CFR Cluj in the 2023–24 season. He made his European debut on 27 July 2023, in a 1–1 draw with Adana Demirspor in the UEFA Europa Conference League second qualifying round. Sava appeared in all 40 league matches and kept 11 clean sheets, and was named the Under-21 Player of the Season by LPF.

=== Udinese ===
On 23 August 2024, Sava joined Serie A club Udinese on a five-year deal, for a transfer fee reportedly worth €2.5 million plus €1 million in bonuses. He made his debut on 25 September, starting and saving a penalty kick in a 3–1 home win over Salernitana in the second round of the Coppa Italia.

Sava recorded his Serie A debut on 9 December 2024, in a 2–1 away victory over Monza. He totalled 12 league matches during his debut season, as Udinese finished 12th in the table.

=== Universitatea Craiova ===
On 19 June 2026, Liga I club Universitatea Craiova announced the signing of Sava on a four-year contract, for an undisclosed fee.

== Career statistics ==
As of match played 29 October 2026

Appearances and goals by club, season and competition
Club	Season	League			National cup (Note: Includes Cupa României, Coppa Italia)		Europe		Other		Total	
Club	Season	Division	Apps	Goals	Apps	Goals	Apps	Goals	Apps	Goals	Apps	Goals
CFR Cluj	2021–22	Liga I	0	0	—		—		—		0	0
CFR Cluj	2022–23	Liga I	3	0	2	0	0	0	0	0	5	0
CFR Cluj	2023–24	Liga I	40	0	3	0	2 (Note: Appearances in UEFA Conference League)	0	—		45	0
CFR Cluj	2024–25	Liga I	5	0	—		4	0	—		9	0
CFR Cluj	Total		48	0	5	0	6	0	0	0	59	0
Udinese	2024–25	Serie A	12	0	1	0	—		—		13	0
Udinese	2025–26	Serie A	7	0	3	0	—		—		10	0
Udinese	Total		19	0	4	0	—		—		23	0
Universitatea Craiova	2026–27	Liga I	6	0	2	0	0	0	1 (Note: Appearance in Supercupa României)	0	9	0
Career total			73	0	11	0	6	0	1	0	91	0

== Honours ==
CFR Cluj

- Supercupa României runner-up: 2022

Universitatea Craiova

- Supercupa României: 2026

Individual

- Liga I Under-21 Player of the Season: 2023–24
