= Damián Pizarro =

Chilean footballer (born 2005)

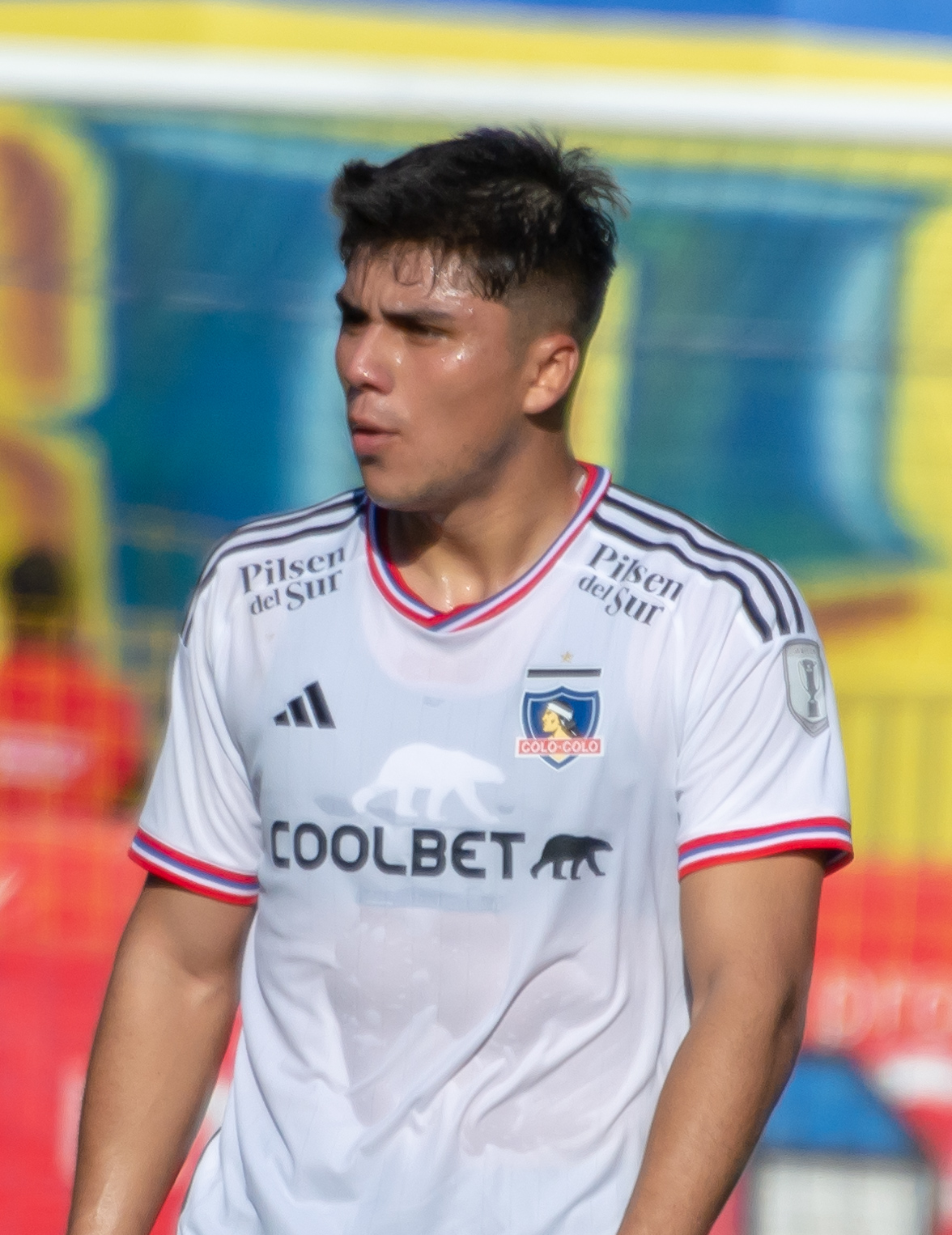
- Pizarro with Colo-Colo in 2023

Personal information
- Full name: Damián Nicolás Pizarro Huenuqueo
- Date of birth: 28 March 2005 (age 21)
- Place of birth: Santiago, Chile
- Height: 1.87 m (6 ft 2 in)
- Position: Forward

Team information
- Current team: Audax Italiano (on loan from Udinese)
- Number: 22

Youth career
- Universidad de Chile
- 2020–2021: Colo-Colo

Senior career*
Years	Team	Apps	(Gls)
2021–2023	Colo-Colo	23	(6)
2024–	Udinese	2	(0)
2024	→ Colo-Colo (loan)	13	(5)
2025	→ Le Havre (loan)	2	(0)
2026	→ Racing Club (loan)	2	(0)
2026–	→ Audax Italiano (loan)	0	(0)

International career^{‡}
2025	Chile U20	9	(0)
2023–	Chile U23	9	(0)
2023	Chile	1	(0)
Medal record
Men's football
Representing Chile
Pan American Games
Silver medal – second place	2023 Santiago	Team
- * Club domestic league appearances and goals as of 17:57, 28 June 2026 (UTC) ‡ National team caps and goals as of 13 February 2024

Damián Nicolás Pizarro Huenuqueo (born 28 March 2005) is a Chilean professional footballer who plays as a forward for Liga de Primera club Audax Italiano, on loan from Serie A club Udinese.

== Club career ==
Pizarro began his career in the academy of Universidad de Chile, moving away from his family home to focus on his career. Having scored two goals against them in a 3–3 draw at youth level, Colo-Colo youth manager Ariel Paolorossi invited Pizarro for a trial with the club, and after only ten minutes of watching him play, decided to sign him, with the forward joining the club in 2020.

After Colo-Colo had sixty-two players sent to quarantine due to COVID-19, Pizarro made his debut in a 2–0 away loss to Audax Italiano on 28 October 2021. Despite the loss, Pizarro's performance was lauded by Chilean media. He would have to wait until 2023 for his next appearance with the club; with first-choice striker Leandro Benegas injured, Pizarro took his place, scoring Colo-Colo's only goal in a 3–1 loss to Cobresal on 18 March.

Following good performances in his first few games for Colo-Colo, he was praised by manager Gustavo Quinteros, who said that he had "no ceiling" regarding his potential. He established himself as a starter in the team, and his performances continued to draw acclaim, most notably in the 2–0 home loss to Boca Juniors in the Copa Libertadores.

However, despite the bright start, Pizarro was unable to add to his goal tally for the next eight games, with manager Quinteros moving him to the right-wing during an eventual 2–1 win against Audax Italiano, allowing Carlos Palacios to take his position up front. However, teammate César Fuentes came out in support of Pizarro, stating that he would "regain his confidence".

In January 2024, Pizarro signed with the Italian club Udinese, staying on loan with Colo-Colo for the first half of the year. In July of the same year, he joined the Udinese squad.

On 26 August 2025, Pizarro moved to Ligue 1 club Le Havre on a loan for a season. He ended his contract on 13 January 2026. Back to South America, he joined on loan to Argentine club Racing Club on 27 January 2026.

On 29 July 2026, Pizarro joined Chilean side Audax Italiano on a loan until June 2027.

== International career ==
In May 2023, Chile national team manager Eduardo Berizzo personally attended the match between Unión Española and Colo-Colo to scout Pizarro ahead of national team friendlies against Cuba and the Dominican Republic.

He was included in the final squad for the 2023 Pan American Games, where Chile won the silver medal.

In 2024, he took part in the Pre-Olympic Tournament.

At senior level, he received his first call up for the 2026 FIFA World Cup qualifiers against Uruguay and Colombia in September 2023 and made his debut against Paraguay on 16 November 2023 as a starting player.

== Career statistics ==
=== Club ===
As of 5 October 2025

Appearances and goals by club, season and competition
Club	Season	League			Cup		Continental		Other		Total	
Club	Season	Division	Apps	Goals	Apps	Goals	Apps	Goals	Apps	Goals	Apps	Goals
Colo-Colo	2021	Chilean Primera División	1	0	—		—		—		1	0
Colo-Colo	2023	Chilean Primera División	22	6	7	1	8 (Note: Six appearances in Copa Libertadores, two appearances in Copa Sudamericana)	0	0	0	37	7
Colo-Colo	Total		23	6	7	1	8	0	0	0	38	7
Colo-Colo (loan)	2024	Chilean Primera División	13	5	0	0	7 (Note: Appearances in Copa Libertadores)	0	0	0	20	5
Udinese	2024–25	Serie A	2	0	1	0	—		—		3	0
Le Havre (loan)	2025–26	Ligue 1	2	0	0	0	—		—		2	0
Career total			40	11	8	1	15	0	0	0	63	12

=== International ===
As of match played 17 November 2023

Appearances and goals by national team and year
National team	Year	Apps	Goals
Chile	2023	1	0
Total		1	0

== Honours ==
Chile U23

- Pan American Games Silver Medal: 2023
