= Kasper Kristensen (footballer, born 1999) =

Danish footballer (born 1999)

Personal information
- Full name: Kasper Thiesson Kristensen
- Date of birth: 4 August 1999 (age 27)
- Place of birth: Aarhus, Denmark
- Height: 1.91 m (6 ft 3 in)
- Position: Goalkeeper

Team information
- Current team: Esbjerg fB
- Number: 16

Senior career*
Years	Team	Apps	(Gls)
2017–2021	AGF	6	(0)
2021–2023	Trelleborgs FF	74	(0)
2024	Helsingør	12	(0)
2024–	Esbjerg fB	15	(0)
- * Club domestic league appearances and goals as of 7 October 2025

Kasper Thiesson Kristensen (born 4 August 1999) is a Danish professional footballer who plays as a goalkeeper for Danish 1st Division club Esbjerg fB.

== Career ==
Kristensen has played for AGF, Trelleborgs FF and Helsingør. In July 2024 he signed for Esbjerg fB.
