= Lautaro Giannetti =

Argentine footballer

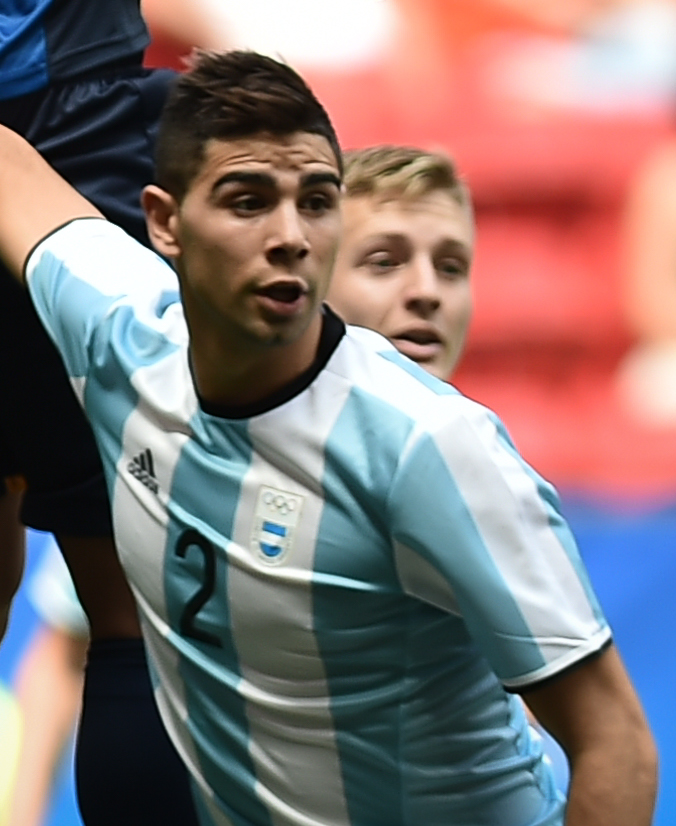
- Giannetti with Argentina at the 2016 Summer Olympics

Personal information
- Full name: Lautaro Daniel Giannetti
- Date of birth: 13 November 1993 (age 32)
- Place of birth: San Nicolás, Argentina
- Height: 1.84 m (6 ft 0 in)
- Position: Centre-back

Team information
- Current team: Newell's Old Boys
- Number: 17

Youth career
- Vélez Sarsfield

Senior career*
Years	Team	Apps	(Gls)
2012–2024	Vélez Sarsfield	170	(3)
2024–2025	Udinese	22	(2)
2025–2026	Antalyaspor	29	(1)
2026–	Newell's Old Boys	1	(0)

International career
2013	Argentina U20	4	(0)
2016	Argentina U23	3	(0)
- * Club domestic league appearances and goals as of 16:46, 26 July 2026 (UTC)

Lautaro Daniel Giannetti (born 13 November 1993) is an Argentine professional footballer who plays as a centre-back for Newell's Old Boys.

== Club career ==
Giannetti debuted professionally for Vélez Sarsfield in the 2012 Clausura under Ricardo Gareca's coaching, starting in a 0–2 defeat to Argentinos Juniors. The defender was part of the squads that won the 2012 Inicial, 2012–13 Superfinal and 2013 Supercopa Argentina, although he did not play any games.

Giannetti became a starter for the team during the second half of the 2015 Argentine Primera División season, in which he started in all 15 games. He scored his first professional goal in the 12th fixture of the 2016 Argentine Primera División, a last-minute winner against Argentinos Juniors.

On 6 January 2024, Giannetti signed a one-and-a-half-year contract with Serie A team Udinese, with an option for a further year.

On 13 August 2025, Giannetti moved to Antalyaspor in Turkey on a two-season deal.

== International career ==
Giannetti was part of the squad of the Argentina national under-20 football team that played the 2013 South American Youth Championship.

In 2016, the defender was selected by coach Gerardo Martino for the preliminary squad of the Argentina national under-23 football team to participate in the Summer Olympics. He was later confirmed by Martino's successor Julio Olarticoechea and started in all three games of the team in the tournament.

== Career statistics ==
=== Club ===
As of match played 25 May 2025

Appearances and goals by club, season and competition
Club	Season	League			National cup		Continental		Other		Total	
Club	Season	Division	Apps	Goals	Apps	Goals	Apps	Goals	Apps	Goals	Apps	Goals
Vélez Sarsfield	2011–12	Argentine Primera División	2	0	1	0	0	0	—		3	0
Vélez Sarsfield	2012–13	Argentine Primera División	2	0	—		0	0	—		2	0
Vélez Sarsfield	2013–14	Argentine Primera División	2	0	0	0	1 (Note: Appearance(s) in Copa Libertadores)	0	—		3	0
Vélez Sarsfield	2014	Argentine Primera División	0	0	—		—		—		0	0
Vélez Sarsfield	2015	Argentine Primera División	15	0	3	0	—		—		18	0
Vélez Sarsfield	2016	Argentine Primera División	14	1	2	0	—		—		16	1
Vélez Sarsfield	2016–17	Argentine Primera División	17	0	—		—		—		17	0
Vélez Sarsfield	2017–18	Argentine Primera División	5	0	1	0	—		—		6	0
Vélez Sarsfield	2018–19	Argentine Primera División	11	0	—		—		3 (Note: Appearance(s) in Copa de la Superliga)	0	14	0
Vélez Sarsfield	2019–20	Argentine Primera División	21	0	0	0	—		1	0	22	0
Vélez Sarsfield	2020–21	Argentine Primera División	10	0	2	0	10 (Note: Appearance(s) in Copa Sudamericana)	0	—		22	0
Vélez Sarsfield	2021	Argentine Primera División	31	1	—		6	0	—		37	1
Vélez Sarsfield	2022	Argentine Primera División	8	0	1	0	1	0	—		10	0
Vélez Sarsfield	2023	Argentine Primera División	32	1	2	0	—		—		34	1
Vélez Sarsfield	Total		170	3	12	0	18	0	4	0	204	3
Udinese	2023–24	Serie A	7	1	—		—		—		7	1
Udinese	2024–25	Serie A	15	1	1	0	—		—		16	1
Udinese	Total		22	2	1	0	—		—		23	2
Career total			192	5	13	0	18	0	4	0	227	5

== Honours ==
Vélez Sársfield

- Argentine Primera División: 2012 Inicial, 2012–13 Superfinal
- Supercopa Argentina: 2013
