= Gonçalo Esteves =

Portuguese footballer

Personal information
- Full name: Gonçalo do Lago Pontes Esteves
- Date of birth: 27 February 2004 (age 22)
- Place of birth: Aboim das Choças, Portugal
- Height: 1.71 m (5 ft 7 in)
- Positions: Right-back; right wing-back

Team information
- Current team: Carrarese (on loan from Catanzaro)
- Number: 20

Youth career
- 2010–2011: ADECAS
- 2011–2021: Porto
- 2019–2020: → Padroense (loan)

Senior career*
Years	Team	Apps	(Gls)
2021–2023	Sporting CP B	22	(1)
2021–2024	Sporting CP	4	(0)
2022	→ Estoril (loan)	3	(0)
2024	→ AZ Alkmaar (loan)	0	(0)
2024	→ Jong AZ (loan)	14	(1)
2024–2026	Udinese	0	(0)
2024–2025	→ Yverdon-Sport (loan)	10	(0)
2025–2026	→ Alverca (loan)	5	(1)
2026–	Catanzaro	3	(0)
2026–	→ Carrarese (loan)	0	(0)

International career^{‡}
2019–2020	Portugal U16	11	(0)
2021–2022	Portugal U18	9	(1)
2021–2023	Portugal U19	18	(2)
2023–2024	Portugal U20	5	(0)
Medal record
Men's football
Representing Portugal
UEFA European Under-19 Championship
Runner-up	2023 Malta
- * Club domestic league appearances and goals as of 19 September 2026 ‡ National team caps and goals as of 14:56, 2 August 2024 (UTC)

Gonçalo do Lago Pontes Esteves (born 27 February 2004) is a Portuguese professional footballer who plays as a right-back or right wing-back for Serie B club Carrarese on loan from Catanzaro.

== Club career ==
Born in Aboim das Choças, Arcos de Valdevez, Esteves started his career with ADC Aboim/Sabadim, before joining Porto. He also spent time on a youth loan at Padroense.

Esteves signed for Sporting CP from Porto in July 2021. He settled well at his new club, and within a week had impressed first-team manager Ruben Amorim enough to secure a place in first team training.

Following good performances for the Lisbon side's B team, Esteves was included in The Guardian's "Next Generation" list for 2021. He scored his first goal for Sporting's B team in a 2–0 victory over Cova da Piedade on 1 October 2021. Two weeks later, he made his first-team debut in the third round of the Taça de Portugal, starting in a 4–0 win at C.F. Os Belenenses. His Primeira Liga debut came on 18 December, again starting in a 3–0 win at Gil Vicente FC; he had been guaranteed his place by Amorim due to the absences of Pedro Porro and Ricardo Esgaio through injury and COVID-19 respectively.

On 30 June 2022, Esteves was loaned to fellow top-flight team G.D. Estoril Praia for the upcoming season. In his second game on 14 August, he was sent off after an hour of a 1–0 loss at Vitória de Guimarães.

On 5 January 2024, Esteves joined Eredivisie club AZ Alkmaar on loan until the end of the 2023–24 season, with an option to make the move permanent, reported to be €2 million.

In August 2024, Esteves joined Serie A side Udinese on a four-year deal. On 29 August 2024, Esteves moved to Yverdon-Sport in Switzerland on loan with an option to buy. On 22 July 2025, Esteves joined Alverca in Primeira Liga on loan. His loan was terminated on 27 January 2026, after making just 7 appearances for the side.

Three days later, Esteves signed a two-and-a-half-year contract with Serie B club Catanzaro.

== International career ==
Esteves has represented Portugal at youth international level.

== Personal life ==
Esteves' older brother, Tomás, is also a footballer who plays as a right-back.

== Career statistics ==
=== Club ===
As of match played 30 September 2023

Appearances and goals by club, season and competition
Club	Season	League			National cup		League cup		Continental		Total	
Club	Season	Division	Apps	Goals	Apps	Goals	Apps	Goals	Apps	Goals	Apps	Goals
Sporting CP B	2021–22	Liga 3	11	1	—		—		—		11	1
Sporting CP B	2022–23	Liga 3	10	0	—		—		—		10	0
Sporting CP B	2023–24	Liga 3	1	0	—		—		—		1	0
Sporting CP B	Total		22	1	—		—		—		22	1
Sporting CP	2021–22	Primeira Liga	4	0	3	0	2	0	1 (Note: Appearance in UEFA Champions League)	0	10	0
Estoril (loan)	2022–23	Primeira Liga	3	0	1	0	0	0	—		4	0
Career total			29	1	4	0	2	0	1	0	36	1
