= Marco Ballarini =

Italian footballer (born 2001)

Personal information
- Date of birth: 28 March 2001 (age 25)
- Place of birth: Gorizia, Italy
- Height: 1.86 m (6 ft 1 in)
- Position: Midfielder

Team information
- Current team: Virtus Verona
- Number: 21

Youth career
- –2020: Udinese

Senior career*
Years	Team	Apps	(Gls)
2020–2026	Udinese	1	(0)
2020–2021	→ Piacenza (loan)	9	(2)
2021–2022	→ Foggia (loan)	11	(0)
2022–2023	→ Trento (loan)	32	(2)
2024–2025	→ Triestina (loan)	3	(0)
2025	→ Lucchese (loan)	7	(1)
2025	→ Rimini (loan)	0	(0)
2026–	Virtus Verona	5	(0)
- * Club domestic league appearances and goals as of 30 April 2026

Marco Ballarini (born 28 March 2001) is an Italian professional footballer who plays as a midfielder for Serie D club Virtus Verona.

== Career ==
He made his Serie A debut for Udinese on 9 July 2020 in an away victory against SPAL.

On 5 October 2020, he went to Serie C side Piacenza on loan.

On 11 August 2021, he was loaned to Foggia in Serie C. On 31 January 2022, the loan was terminated early and he returned to Udinese. He remained on the bench for Udinese for the remainder of the 2021–22 season.

On 16 July 2022, Ballarini joined Trento on loan for a season.

On 17 January 2024, he joined Triestina on loan. On 1 September 2025, Ballarini was loaned to Rimini.

== Club statistics ==
=== Club ===
As of 10 July 2020.

Club	Season	League			Cup		Other		Total	
Club	Season	Division	Apps	Goals	Apps	Goals	Apps	Goals	Apps	Goals
Udinese	2019–20	Serie A	1	0	0	0	0	0	1	0
Career total			1	0	0	0	0	0	1	0
