= Isaak Touré =

French footballer (born 2003)

Personal information
- Full name: Souleymane Isaak Touré
- Date of birth: 28 March 2003 (age 23)
- Place of birth: Gonesse, France
- Height: 2.06 m (6 ft 9 in)
- Position: Defender

Team information
- Current team: Lorient
- Number: 95

Youth career
- 2010–2013: AEA Saint-Pierre
- 2013–2014: CO Cléon
- 2014–2020: Le Havre

Senior career*
Years	Team	Apps	(Gls)
2020	Le Havre B	4	(0)
2020–2022	Le Havre	18	(0)
2022–2023	Marseille	5	(0)
2023	→ Auxerre (loan)	19	(1)
2023–	Lorient	30	(2)
2024–2025	→ Udinese (loan)	12	(1)

International career
2019–2020	France U17	6	(0)
2021–2022	France U19	11	(2)
2022–2023	France U20	3	(0)
2023	France U21	1	(0)
- * Club domestic league appearances and goals as of 16:18, 21 November 2026 (UTC)

Souleymane Isaak Touré (born 28 March 2003) is a French professional footballer who plays as a defender for Ligue 1 club Lorient.

== Early life ==
Touré was born in Gonesse, in the northern suburbs of Paris. He holds Ivorian nationality from birth and acquired French nationality on 11 December 2008, through the collective effect of his mother's naturalization.

== Club career ==
On 11 July 2020, Touré signed his first professional contract with Le Havre. He made his professional debut in a 1–0 Ligue 2 win over Amiens on 29 August.

On 30 June 2022, Touré signed for Ligue 1 club Marseille on a five-year contract. On 3 January 2023, Touré joined AJ Auxerre on loan until the end of the season.

== International career ==
Touré is a youth international for France.
