= Sekou Diawara =

Belgian footballer (born 2004)

Personal information
- Date of birth: 8 February 2004 (age 22)
- Place of birth: Deinze, Belgium
- Height: 1.87 m (6 ft 1 1/2 in)
- Position: Striker

Team information
- Current team: Zürich U21
- Number: 39

Youth career
- Gent
- 2018–2022: Genk

Senior career*
Years	Team	Apps	(Gls)
2022–2023	Genk II	11	(4)
2023–2024	Udinese	0	(0)
2024	→ Beerschot (loan)	6	(1)
2024–2025	Francs Borains	1	(0)
2025	Udinese	0	(0)
2025	→ Lucchese (loan)	0	(0)
2025–	Zürich U21	8	(2)

International career^{‡}
2019	Belgium U16	1	(1)
2021–2022	Belgium U19	3	(3)
2023	Belgium U20	2	(0)
- * Club domestic league appearances and goals as of 1 October 2026 ‡ National team caps and goals as of 20:58, 12 December 2023 (UTC)

Sekou Diawara (born 8 February 2004) is a Belgian professional footballer who plays as a striker for Swiss Promotion League side Zürich U21.

== Playing career ==
A youth product of Gent, Diawara moved to Genk's youth academy in 2018. On 7 August 2020 he signed his first professional contract to Gent until 2023, and was later promoted to Jong Genk in 2022. He had a falling out with Genk after being suspended for posing with his brother Mamady celebrating the latters' move to Club Brugge. On 25 January 2023, he moved to the Italian club Udinese on a contract until 2027. He made his senior debut with Udinese in a 2–1 Coppa Italia loss in extra time to Cagliari on 12 December 2023.

On 25 January 2024, Diawara moved on loan to Beerschot until the end of the season.

On 6 September 2024, Diawara joined Challenger Pro League club Francs Borains. On 9 January 2025, Francs Borains announced Diawara's return to Udinese.

On 7 November 2025, Diawara signed a three-year contract with Zürich in Switzerland and was assigned to their Under-21 squad that plays in the third-tier Promotion League.

== International career ==
Born in Belgium, Diawara is of Guinean descent. He is a youth international for Belgium, having played for the Belgium 20s in September 2023.
