= Bell Ville =

City in Córdoba Province, Argentina

- City
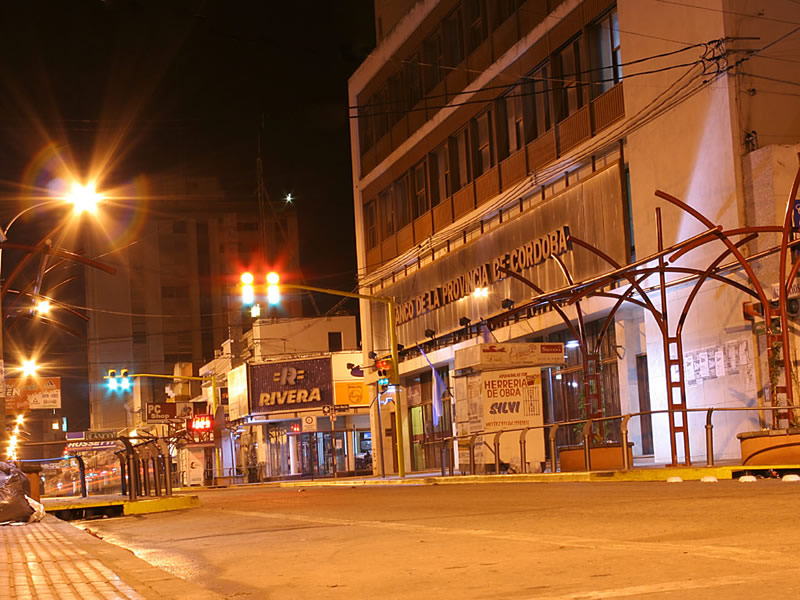
- Nickname: Bell Ville
- Location of Bell Ville in Argentina Bell Ville (Córdoba Province)
- Coordinates: 32°38′S 62°41′W
- Country: Argentina
- Province: Córdoba
- Department: Unión

Government
  - Intendant: Juan Manuel Moroni (UCR)

Area
  - Total: 41.77 km^{2} (16.13 sq mi)
- Elevation: 130 m (430 ft)

Population (2022 census)
  - Total: 37,995
  - Density: 909.6/km^{2} (2,356/sq mi)
- Time zone: UTC−3 (ART)
- CPA base: X2550
- Dialing code: +54 3537

Bell Ville is a city located in the southeast of Córdoba. The city lies 200 kilometers southeast of the capital city of Córdoba Province, Argentina. Bell Ville is located where National Route 9 and National Route 3 intersect. The city also lies on the railway line connecting Córdoba, Rosario, and Buenos Aires. Bell Ville is the administrative center of Unión Department in southeastern Córdoba Province.

Throughout its history, Bell Ville has evolved from a ranch and village to a military fort, customs inspection and control point, and ultimately, a recognized town and city. Bell Ville is located in the Humid Pampas region, bordering the Tercero River. The city is served by the broad-gauge General Bartolomé Mitre Railway, connecting the cities of Córdoba, Rosario, and Buenos Aires. In addition, geographically speaking, the city is situated halfway between the two metropolitan areas along Route 9. It is 200 kilometers southeast of Córdoba and 200 kilometers northwest of Rosario.

Economically speaking, the region is primarily based on agriculture and cattle farming. The region also processes the crops produced here into other usable products. However, the region has a unique industry dedicated to the manufacturing of footballs, earning it the nickname “National Capital of the Football.”

== Population ==
As of the 2022 National Census by the National Institute of Statistics and Census (INDEC), the population of Bell Ville is 37,995 residents. This represents a 10.3% rise from the 34,439 residents it had as of the 2010 National Census.

=== Demography ===
According to the 1779 census, the population of Fraile Muerto (now Bell Ville) was 1,682 inhabitants, with an average of 8.4 individuals per family. The population composition was predominantly Spaniards (57%), followed by Mulattos (25%), Mestizos (7%), Indigenous people (6%), and Blacks (5%). There was a significant exodus in 1734 towards Pago de Areco and the province of Buenos Aires, resulting in a sparse population between 1734 and 1745. By 1744, records from the countryside census of Buenos Aires Province indicated 150 families from Córdoba, suggesting that the population of Fraile Muerto in 1720 was at least 1,200 inhabitants.

Population growth remained steady until 1815 when raids intensified, causing a decrease as people moved towards Río Cuarto and the Cuyo provinces. From 1866, English, Scottish, and Irish immigrants arrived due to the proximity of the railway's construction, the quality and affordability of the land. The end of the war with Paraguay in 1868 was beneficial as returning troops helped control raids more effectively, leading to a progressive increase in population.

Massive immigration of Italians and Spaniards occurred from around 1880 through the railway. Since 1991, and notably after the closure of a major meatpacking plant in 1998, the city has experienced a marked slowdown in population growth.

== History ==
The first Europeans to set foot in the area where Bell Ville now stands were ten survivors of Sebastián Gaboto's expedition in the spring of 1529, under the command of Francisco César. They encountered the main settlement of the Litines, a subgroup of the Het people, named after their chief Litín. After staying for several days, the explorers continued their journey through dense forests along the riverbanks, rich with Prosopis trees, chañares, tasis (Araujia sericifera), molles and mistoles.

According to engineer Agustín Villarroel in his book, in 1584-1585, a friar died at the location where Bell Ville would later be established. The friar's name and religious order remain undisclosed, leading to the area being known as Fraile Muerto (Dead Friar).

In addition, in 1585, an expedition led by General Alonso de la Cámara, accompanied by Juan de Mitre, departed from Córdoba to establish the shortest route between Córdoba and Buenos Aires. They marked the route every four leagues for mule trains, carts, and messengers. At Fraile Muerto, a marker was placed to signify the river crossing known as "El paso grande" (The big pass), where the banks were cleared for easier transit. The origin of the current city of Bell Ville dates back to 1650 when Lorenzo de Lara y Mimenza (sergeant major of the Royal Colonial Armies, Spanish of Chilean origin) was assigned by royal grant a field of 8 square leagues (21,598 hectares) and there together with his wife, Marcela de Mendoza, they founded the Estancia de la Limpia Concepción de Fraile Muerto. In the first thirty years of the 19th century the zone was a battlefield between the Creoles and the ranqueles, as well as field of combat between "federal" and "unitary", happening in 1818 in the surrounding areas the fratricidal combat between the troops supervised by Juan Bautista Bustos and the troops under the order of Estanislao López. The second half of the 1860s the real development of the population began with the construction of the tracing of the Central Argentine Railroad that would join - between other cities - Buenos Aires with Córdoba.

At the end of 1870 when the First Industrial Exhibition was showcased for the above-mentioned railroad, the president at the time, Domingo Faustino Sarmiento from Argentina realized, while in the city of Córdoba (1871), to stop at their railway station called "Dead Friar” and decided to change the name of the railway station naming it Bell Ville for a double motive: the paronomasia with Beautiful Villa in honoring to the Scottish colonists from Dunbar, Antonio and Ricardo Bell, who established themselves in the place and they had initiated an agriculture and modern ranching (cattle) in the zone. In 1872 the whole population happened to be call Bell Ville.

From the second half of the 19th century the population received great quantity of immigrants proceeding from Europe, and it obtained the range of city on August 17, 1908.

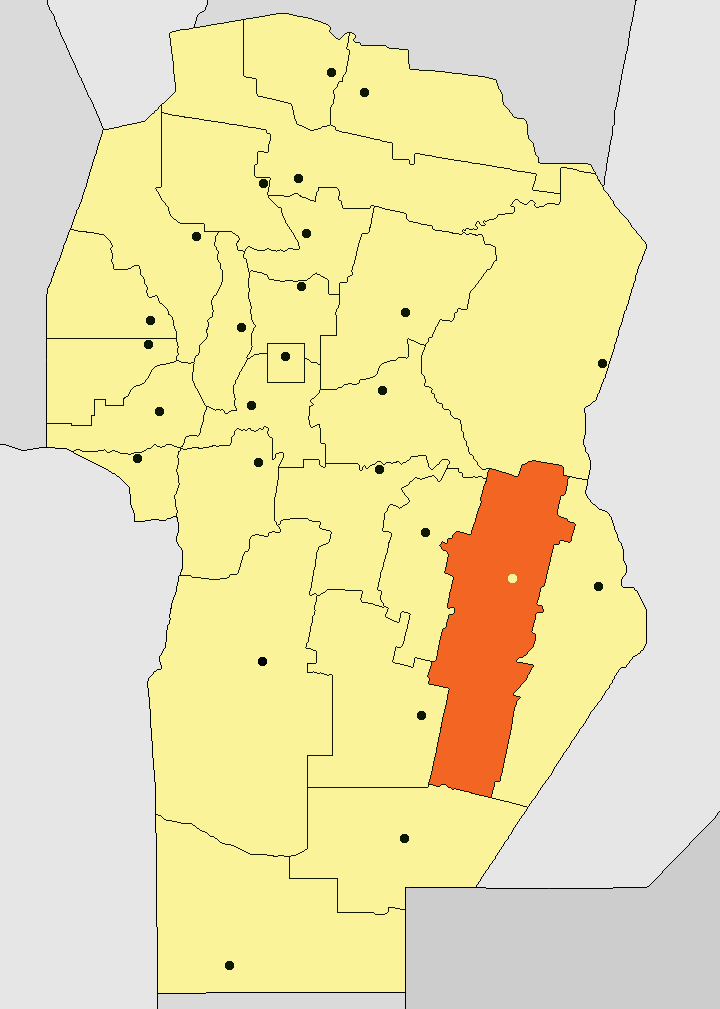

== Economy ==
Like other cities in the Humid Pampas, Bell Ville is a prosperous urban center whose economy is based on primary and secondary sectors, specifically agriculture (soybeans, wheat, sunflowers, maize) and livestock farming (cattle), as well as the processing and industrialization of agricultural raw materials. The local industry is primarily in food processing and metallurgy, particularly in the manufacturing of agricultural machinery and parts. Bell Ville is also home to 11 small and medium-sized companies specializing in the production of soccer balls, grouped under the Argentine Manufacturers' Circle of Balls and Related Products (CAFABA). The largest of these companies employs 30 staff and contracts around 150 seamstresses.

On December 29, 2000, Ordinance No. 1150/2000 was enacted, establishing the "Industrial Pole Bell Ville," which attracted several local industries to the area. According to the provincial census of 2008, the city was home to 172 small and medium-sized industries, as well as 1,040 businesses.

Census statistics
	value	notes	source
Population	34,439		Census 2010
Apartments	12,808		Census 2010
Households	11,290		Census 2010
Homeowners	75.7%		Census 2010
Housing deficit	24.3%	2,743 houses	Census 2010
Literacy rate	98.5%		Census 2010
Unemployment rate	4.4%		Census 2008
Employment Rate	46.5%		Census 2008
Industries	172	44 metallurgical 32 food	Census 2008
Businesses	1,040	20 pharmacies	Census 2008
Household electricity	100%		Census 2010
Paved roads	70%		Census 2010
Landline telephony	100%		Census 2010
Running water	100%		Census 2010
Sewage	85%		Census 2010
Natural gas	95%		Census 2010
Urban electricity supply	100%		Census 2010
Green spaces per capita	16.5 m^{2}/per	570,000 m²	Census 2010
Vehicles	25,610	11,200 cars 10,200 motorcycles	Census 2008

== Governors ==
List of Governors of Bell Ville
Name	Tenure
Juan Fernández	1954 - 1955
Julio C. Luna	1955
Hugo Leonelli	1955 - 1958
Ángel Viqueira	1958 - 1963
Nilo Colmano	1963 - 1966
Alerino Beltramino	1966
Ángel Viqueira	1966 - 1967
Ramón Céliz Pizarro	1967 - 1969
Horacio Ernesto Aramburo	1969 - 1973
Nilo Colmano	1973 - 1976
Gabriel Fernández	1976 - 1979
Nelso F. Gonella	1979 - 1983
Andrés A. Pérez	1983 - 1991
Nelso F. Gonella	1991 - 1997
Hugo L. García	1997 - 1999
Nelson J. Iperico	1999 - 2007
M. del Carmen Ceballos	2007 - 2011
Nelson J. Iperico	2011 - 2015
Carlos Briner	2015 - 2023
Juan Manuel Moroni	2023–Present

== Education ==
Education in the city is extensive, with various institutions at different levels.

=== Primary ===
- Florentino Ameghino School
- Provincia del Neuquén School
- Ponciano Vivanco School
- Nuestra Señora del Huerto Institute
- San José College
- Hilario Ascasubi School
- José María Paz Schools
- Juan Bautista Alberdi School
- Dalmacio Vélez Sarsfield School
- Superior Normal School José Figueroa Alcorta
- Arturo Matterson School (former National No.192)
- Maria Montessori Special School
- Leon Luis Pellegrino School for Hearing Impaired

=== Secondary ===
- San José College
- Nuestra Señora del Huerto Institute
- IPEM No. 140 "Domingo Faustino Sarmiento" (former Commercial College)
- IPET No. 267 "Antonio Graziano" (former ENET)
- IPEA No. 293 "Agrónomo Orestes Chiesa Molinari" (former ENA)
- IPEM No. 290 "General Manuel Belgrano" (former National College)
- IPEM No. 87 "Robertina Moyano de Sastre"
- Superior Normal School "José Figueroa Alcorta"
- IPEM No. 46 Polyvalent Arts Center "Martín Malaharro"
- Adult Middle Level Educational Center No. 201 with 6 annexes (Monte Leña, San Marcos Sud, Morrison, Ballesteros, San Antonio de Litín, and Cintra)

=== Tertiary and University ===
- Blas Pascal University
- Aeronautical University Institute
- Entrance courses for the National University of Córdoba
- Siglo 21 University
- "Mariano Moreno" Teaching Institute
- "José Gabriel Brochero" Teaching Institute
- Nursing School "Dr. Ramón J. Carrillo"
- Foundation for University Education
- FASTA University (Believe Comprehensive Studies Center)
- Belgrano University (Believe Comprehensive Studies Center)

=== Vocational Education ===
- CEDER (Agency for Employment Promotion and Vocational Training)
- School of Vocational Training
- Institute of Vocational Training

=== Languages ===
- Target English Centre
- English Cultural Association
- Alliance Française
- Dante Alighieri (Italian)
- Believe Comprehensive Studies Center
- Oxford Center
- IICANA (Argentine-North American Cultural Exchange Institute)

=== Arts ===
- Superior Conservatory of Music "Gilardo Gilardi"
- Polyvalent Arts Center "Martín Malharro"
- School of Fine Arts Fernando Fader
- Music and Municipal Band School of Bell Ville "Ernesto Alfonso Bianchi"

=== Other Organizations ===
==== Music School and Municipal Band of Bell Ville "Ernesto Alfonso Bianchi" ====
The Municipal Children's Band was officially founded on October 31, 1938, during Arturo Matterson's mayoralty, and was led from the beginning by Ernesto Bianchi (an Italian born in Monteleone in 1870), with assistance in musical education from Mr. Armando Moine. To sustain it, a tax on public performances was established, and an administrative commission was created to manage its affairs, composed of Mr. José Di Lollo, Emilio Chinetti, Leopoldo Rodino, Domingo Giardilli, Salvador Leonetti, Enrique Rassero, and Eduardo Tossolini. On June 8, 1955, during Hugo Leonelli's mayoralty, it was decided to name the school after its creator and first director, Ernesto Bianchi, who had died in Buenos Aires in 1953. Currently, the band consists of 97 musicians. The Children's Home was founded on September 11, 1966, at 240 Corrientes Street, premises donated by the parish of Bell Ville. Since then, 20 children have been cared for, thanks to widespread community support. The project expanded, and due to the need for more space, the Lions Club undertook the construction of a building at the corner of España and Corrientes avenues, which was inaugurated on April 29, 1979, allowing for the care of 80 children. Subsequently, Banco Sudecor Cooperativo Limitado donated two classrooms that were inaugurated on June 3, 1982. Today, the Children's Home accommodates children aged between 3 and 14 years, providing comprehensive education. They receive balanced meals daily, including breakfast and lunch, along with behavioral norms and comprehensive medical and social assistance. The children are supported with educational activities. Considering the child as a whole person, the Children's Home extends its influence to the family, neighborhood, and community, working intensively within the home environment.

==== Bellvillense Union of Secondary Students (U.B.E.S.) ====
Founded in 1948 to foster the development of future community leaders, the Bellvillense Union of Secondary Students has played, continues to play, and will continue to play a significant role in Bell Ville. This entity, with over 70 years of history, is a great source of pride for all residents of Bell Ville and remains unique throughout Argentina, yet it does not have its own headquarters. The committee members rarely exceed 17 years of age. UBES, as it is popularly known, has shown tangible evidence of what youth can achieve when entrusted with responsibilities. UBES organizes traditional mini UBES competitions, cultural, environmental, and sports events, and also hosts dances for Friendship Day, students, and graduates. Recently, this organization has added valuable community initiatives and many proposals that are being implemented year by year to improve everything that simple students are maintaining.

== Healthcare ==
On August 7, 1921, the Central Hospital was established in Bell Ville, which over the years acquired the name of its first director, Dr. José Ceballos. It soon became the primary center for patient care in the city and the wider Unión Department. The healthcare complex offers inpatient services, including special wards for children, maternity, neonatology, traumatology, intensive care, surgery, and medical clinics for men and women. It also features specialized areas for Mental Health and for the rehabilitation of patients with alcohol and drug problems. Currently, Dr. Tomás Guillermo serves as the hospital's director. Additionally, municipal dispensaries are located throughout the city to provide rapid first aid assistance to the entire population. Bell Ville also hosts private clinics such as "Clínica Mayo," "Clínica Unión," "Clínica Regional," among others. Some health cooperatives with their own facilities include "AMMA."

== Security ==
Bell Ville hosts branches of the Argentine Federal Police, located in a building on Rivadavia Street, and the Provincial Police, situated in a facility on España Avenue which includes a prison. In 2009, Bell Ville established the Citizen Security department, equipped with two vehicles dedicated to road safety. Each vehicle is operated by one municipal police officer and one provincial police officer. This institution operates nightly from 20:00 to 06:00 the following day, aimed at preventing nighttime robberies. As part of the construction of the Children's Plaza, a security camera system was installed to deter vandalism and criminal activities.

== Climate ==
Bell Ville experiences a temperate climate according to data collected by NASA between 1931 and 1960. The average annual temperature is 17°C with a mean maximum of 25°C and a mean minimum of 9°C. The city receives an average annual precipitation of 800 mm.

== Geography ==
Bell Ville is situated in the region known as the humid pampas, at the intersection of Provincial Route 3 and National Route 9. The Tercero River (also known as Ctalamochita River) meanders through the city for approximately 10 km. It is navigable by medium-sized boats and Barges, although its potential as a waterway remains underutilized.

== Sports ==
Bell Ville hosts several clubs that compete in the Bellvillense Football League, headquartered in the city. The league includes teams from nearby towns and cities such as Leones, Morrison, and Marcos Juárez. Some of the notable clubs in Bell Ville include:

Club Atlético y Biblioteca Bell
Founded on August 30, 1904, it is home to the Ciudad de Bell Ville Stadium, with a capacity of 8,100 spectators. The club's jersey features vertical black and white stripes.
Club Atlético Talleres
Established on July 23, 1926, their jersey consists of vertical red and blue stripes, initially blue with a central horizontal red stripe.
Club Atlético Argentino
Founded on October 16, 1910, celebrating 113 years, their jersey is vertically striped in light blue and white.
Club Atlético Central
Founded on May 9, 1922, their jersey is red.
Club Atlético y Biblioteca River Plate
Founded on March 25, 1923, celebrating 101 years, this club's name pays homage to the famous Buenos Aires club but their jersey represents their rival, featuring blue with a central horizontal yellow stripe, akin to Boca Juniors.

Bell Ville has hosted 2 editions of the Five-pin billiards World Championship in 1968 and 1978

== Tourism ==
While primarily known for agriculture and industry, Bell Ville offers recreational opportunities centered around its river, which runs through the city center for 3 km. This feature provides centrally located beaches within Parque Tau, known as Playa Paso de la Arena and Playa El Diquecito. During summer, these beaches are equipped with lifeguards and bars. Playa El Diquecito also features a boat and jet ski ramp.

=== Points of Interest ===
- Hospital Primero de Bell Ville: Although most of its buildings date back to the 20th century, notable architectural examples include:
- Hotel de Inmigrantes (1887): Provincial Historical Monument.
- Church of La Inmaculada Concepción (1870): Provincial Historical Monument.
- Casa de La Cultura or "Casa de los Araya" (1873)
- Palacio Municipal (1944)
- Hospital Primero de Bell Ville (1890)
- Cine Teatro Coliseo (1900)
- Headquarters of IUA, Instituto Universitario Aeronáutico
- Granja Cuñataí
- Paseo de la Reconstrucción
- Pyramid Monument in honor of Hilario Ascasubi
- Monument to the Soccer Ball
- Natural Reserve Parque Francisco Tau: Located at coordinates 32°37′27″S 62°42′8″W, this reserve is a small surviving area of the region's original native forests, surrounded by urban development.

=== Monuments ===
Bell Ville features several monuments:

- "El Ancla": Located on Av. Güemes.
- Monument to Mothers: Located on Av. España.
- Statue of Liberty: Found on Av. Costanera within the Paseo de la Reconstrucción, replicating an old fountain from Plaza 25 de Mayo.
- Monument to Firefighters: Situated at the end of the Costanera.
- Pyramid Ascasubi: Constructed in honor of Hilario Ascasubi, a gaucho poet born in the city in 1807.
- Monument in remembrance of the Falklands War

=== Canoeing ===
Bell Ville hosts a canoeing club established by Edgardo Roth and Francisco Geminiani in the late 1960s. Members can store or borrow canoes and kayaks at the club, conveniently located in Parque Tau with direct access to the Tercero River.

=== Anniversary ===
Although the city was never officially founded, municipal authorities recognized November 9, 1676, as its founding date after thorough historical research. Every year, the city celebrates its anniversary with a parade involving local institutions (firefighters, schools, police, among others) and nearby communities (such as the Agrupación Gaucha de Monte Leña). The festivities include concerts by local music groups and fireworks.

=== Aquarama Festival ===
The Aquarama Festival is held at Parque Tau, specifically at Playa Paso de la Arena. Revived by the municipality in 2011 after a 31-year hiatus, the event attracts over ten thousand people over two days. The festival includes performances by local bands, neighboring city bands, and culminates with renowned artists like Coki Ramírez. On the second day, local bands perform alongside comedian Martín Bustos. The festival also features a competition to crown the Aquarama Queen and ends with spectacular fireworks.

=== The Ball that Bell Ville launched into the World ===
Until 1930, soccer balls were made of cowhide or horsehide, causing injuries due to surface irregularities. Romano Polo envisioned a smooth, round ball for better gameplay and safety, which he and his friends Antonio Tossolini and Juan Valbonessi developed. They patented the design under the brand "SUPERBALL," revolutionizing soccer worldwide and earning Bell Ville the title of "birthplace of the soccer ball."

=== National Soccer Ball Festival ===
Bell Ville hosts the National Soccer Ball Festival, attracting prestigious teams in a celebration of the game. The event includes conferences, exhibitions, contests, parades, music, performances, and a magnificent fireworks show to conclude. In 2008, the National Soccer Ball Festival took place from February 20 to 24. It was the fourteenth edition of the festival. The under-17 teams that participated included:

- from Buenos Aires — Asociación Atlética Argentinos Juniors, Club Atlético River Plate and Racing Club
- from Córdoba — Instituto Atlético Central Córdoba and Club Atlético Belgrano
- representing Bell Ville — Liga Bellvillense and Provincial leagues

=== Rally Ciudad de Bell Ville ===
In 2008, Bell Ville introduced the Rally Ciudad de Bell Ville as the third round in the provincial championship, spanning three days with one day dedicated to presentations and two for competition.

== Media outlets ==
=== Television ===
Bell Ville has a local television channel that broadcasts the local news program "Panorama," as well as other shows like "Popular TV," a music program with 15 years on air, and "Contacto Rural," specializing in agricultural information, which has reached South American screens through production by "Costumbre Rurales" on Canal Rural. Teleocho, Canal 10, and El Doce: Channels Teleocho (Telefe), Canal 10 (Multimedio SRT), and El Doce (Artear) from the City of Córdoba each have a repeater in Bell Ville, broadcasting on channels 7 (Canal 10), 42 (Teleocho), and 66 (El Doce).

=== Radio ===
There are numerous FM radio stations, including:

- 90.3 MHz - MEGA "Mucha + Música"
- Cadena 3 FM 102.9
- Estación 95 FM 91.5
- Estación Popular FM 98.3
- Radio Ciudad FM 89.9
- Radio Alegría 99.9
- Radio María 90.9
- FM Latina 93.5
- FM Hot 95.5
- Radio Bell Ville 99.1
- FM 2000 103.9
- Radio Vida 106.7
- La Hormiga 107.5

=== Print media ===
Prominent print media includes the "Semanario Tribuna," which sells 3,000 copies per week, and the monthly free newspaper "Zona Sur." Bell Ville also has digital newspapers such as Informabellville, Diario Marca, La Nueva Opinión, and El Sudeste de Córdoba.

== Notable people ==
- Poet and writer Hilario Ascasubi
- Footballer Mario Kempes
- Footballer Hugo Curioni
- Goalkeeper Mauricio Caranta
- Footballer Silvio Carrario
- Footballer Osvaldo Ardiles
- Footballer Hernán Barcos
- Tennis player Pedro Cachín

== Sister cities ==
- - Yongkang, China (2004)
- - Bricherasio, Italy (1998)

== Gallery ==
=== Contemporary ===
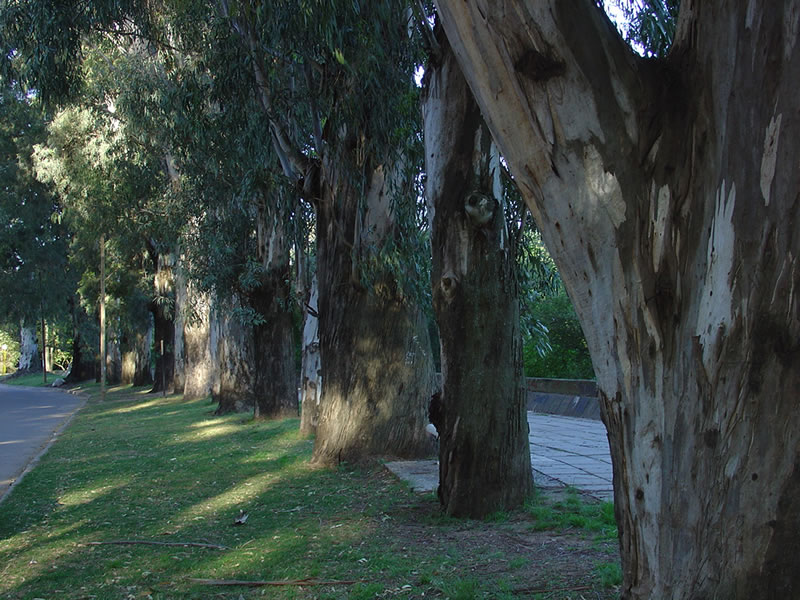

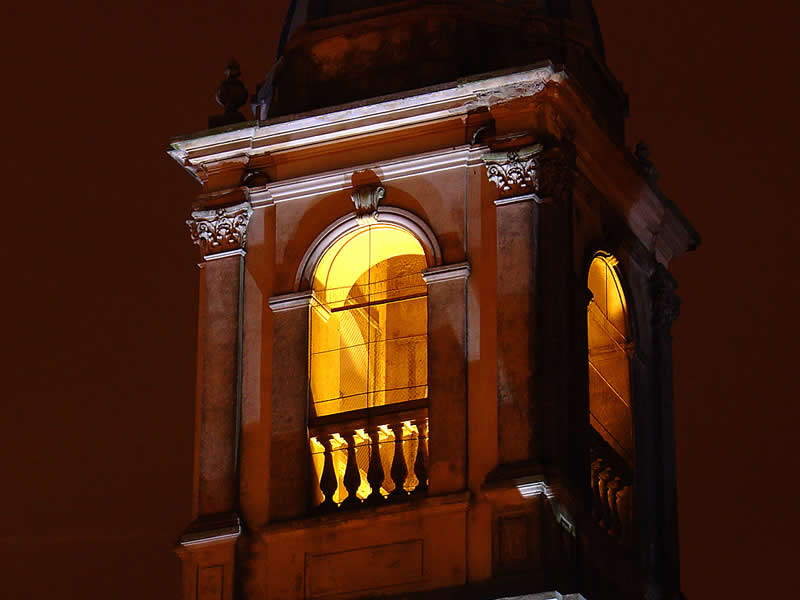

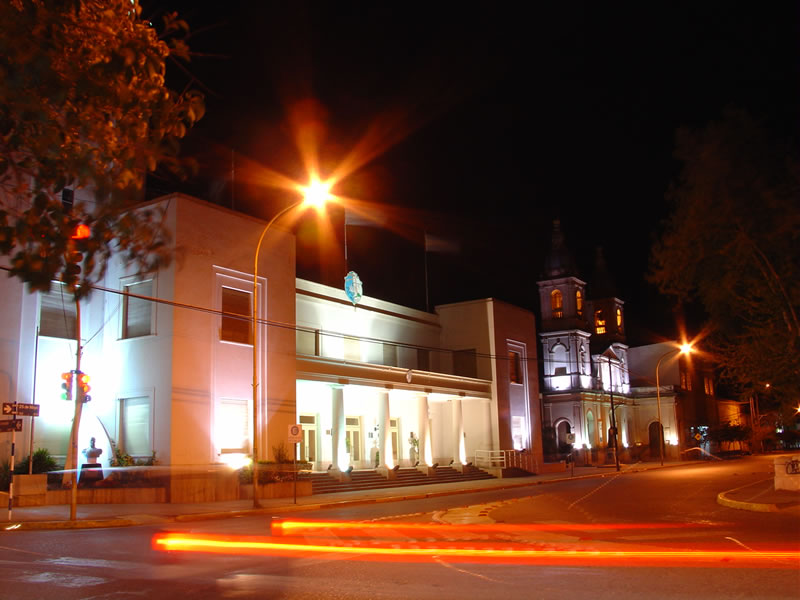

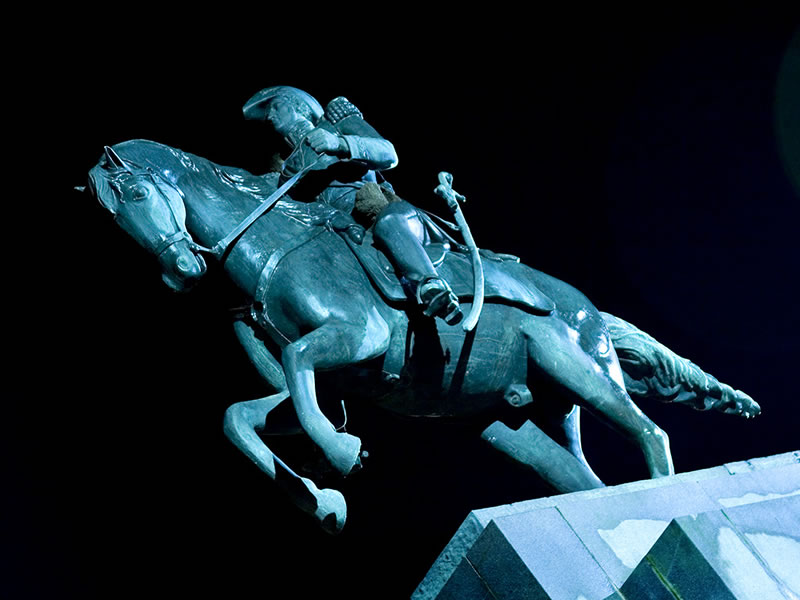

=== Historic (c. 1957) ===
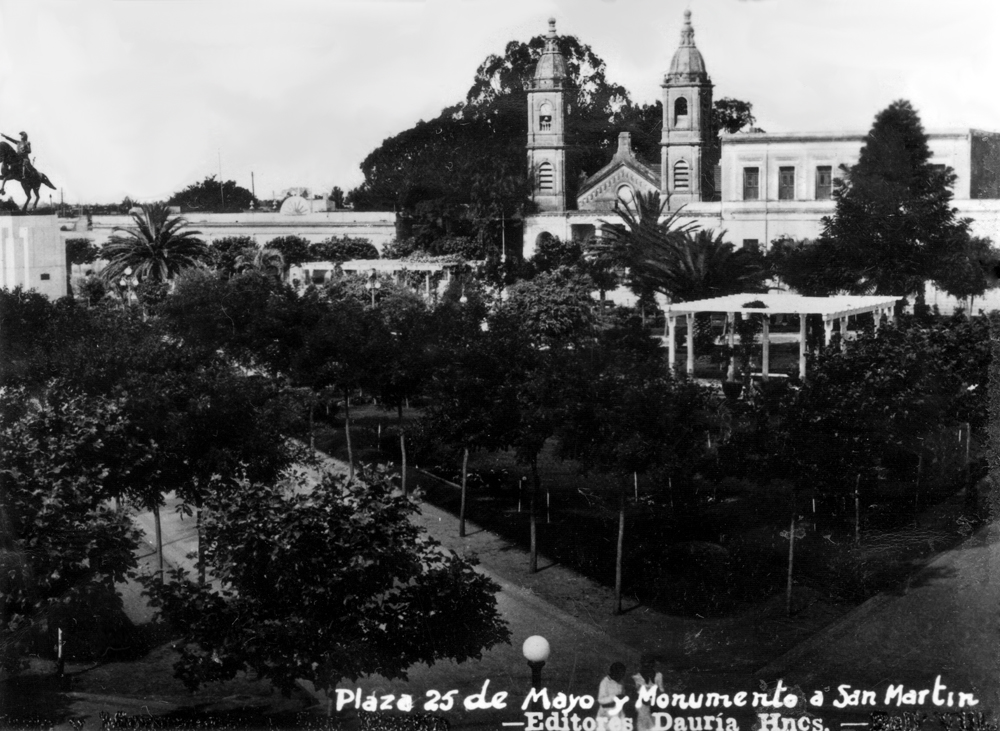

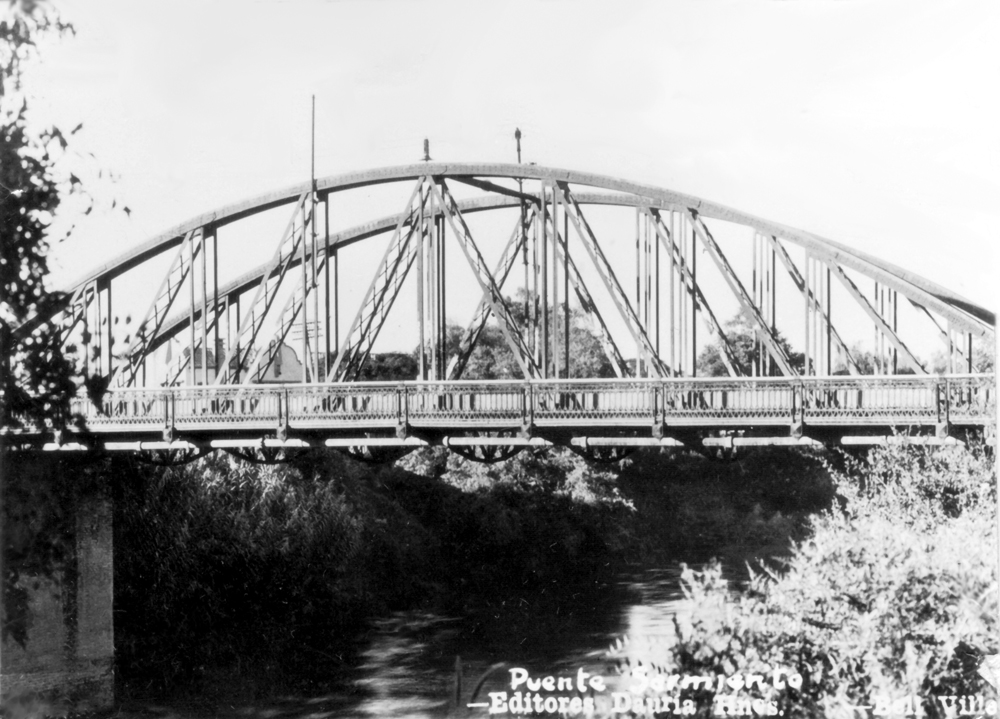

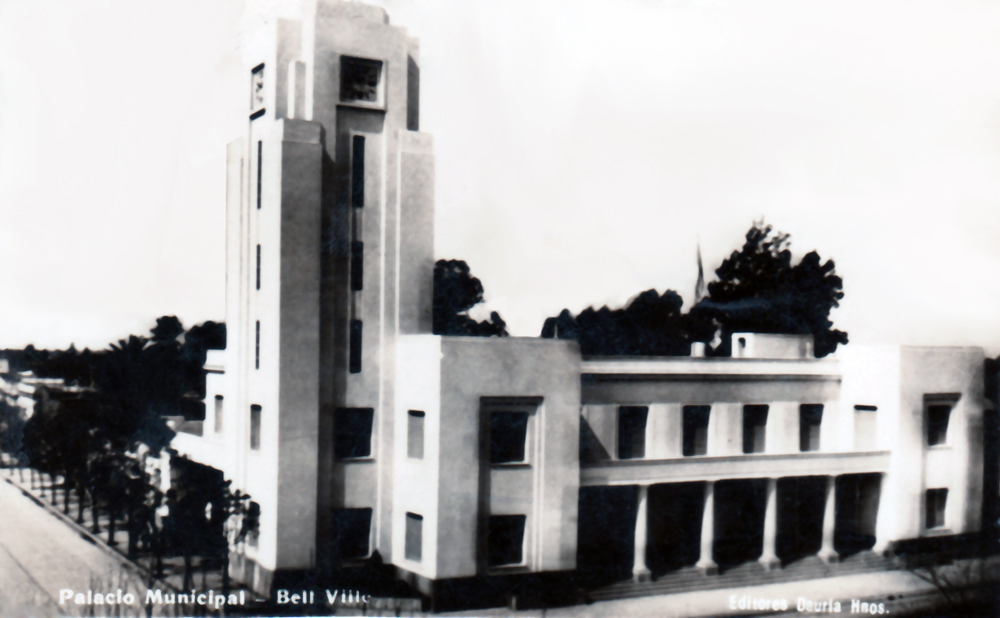

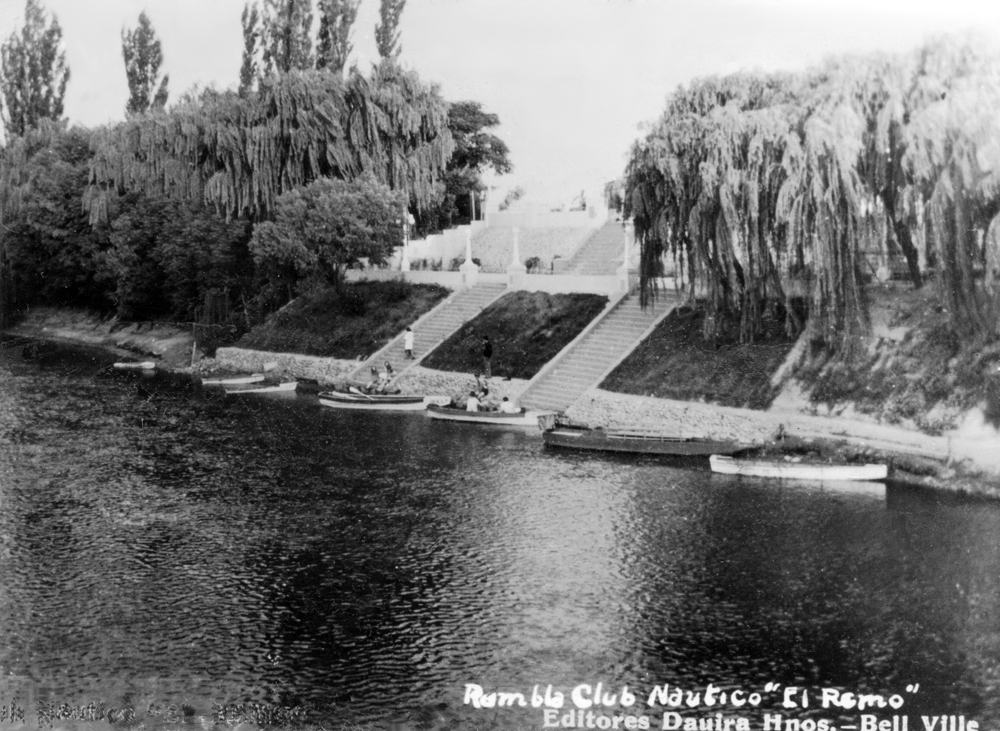

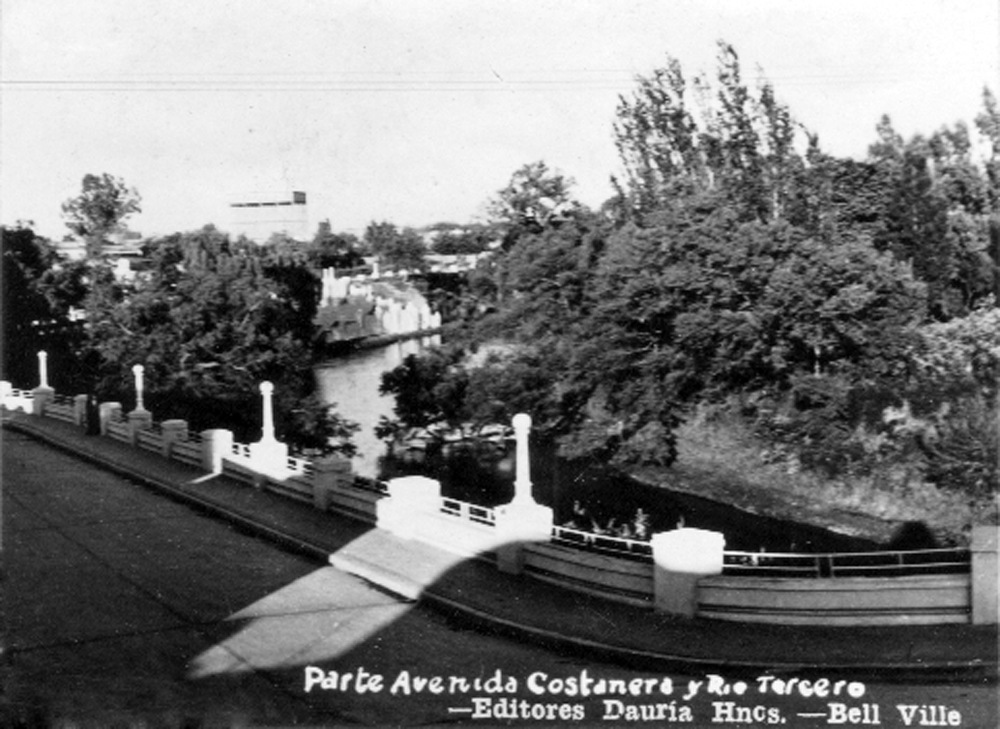

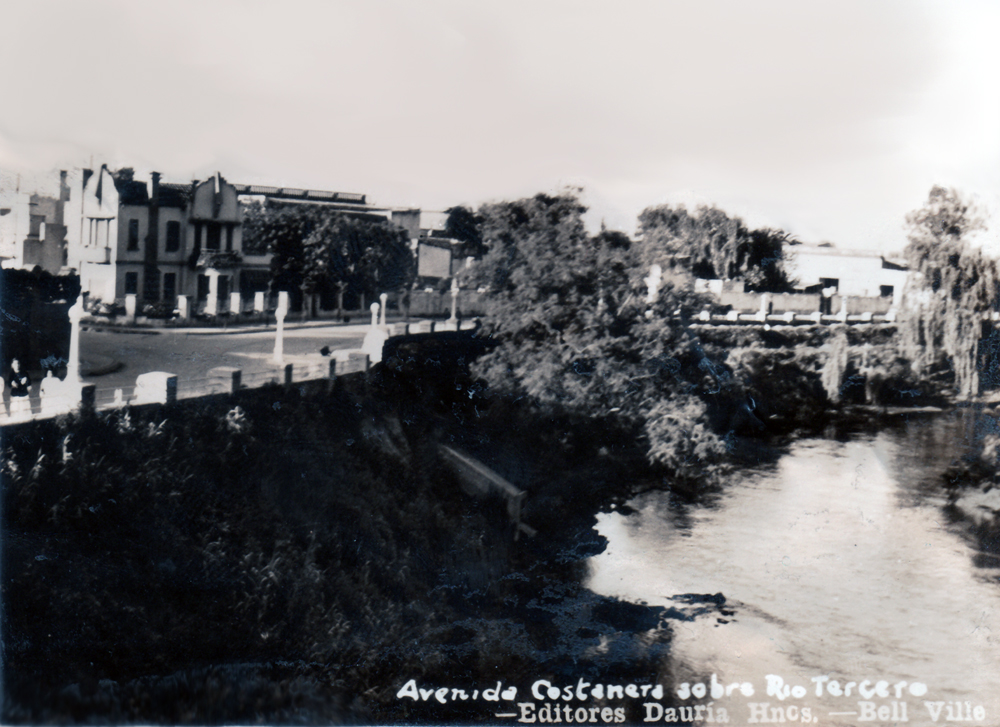

== 2008 Bell Ville rally championship ==
In the year 2008 was the presentation of Bell Ville rally championship , third date in the province championship; there were 3 days of competition: one of presentation and two of competition.

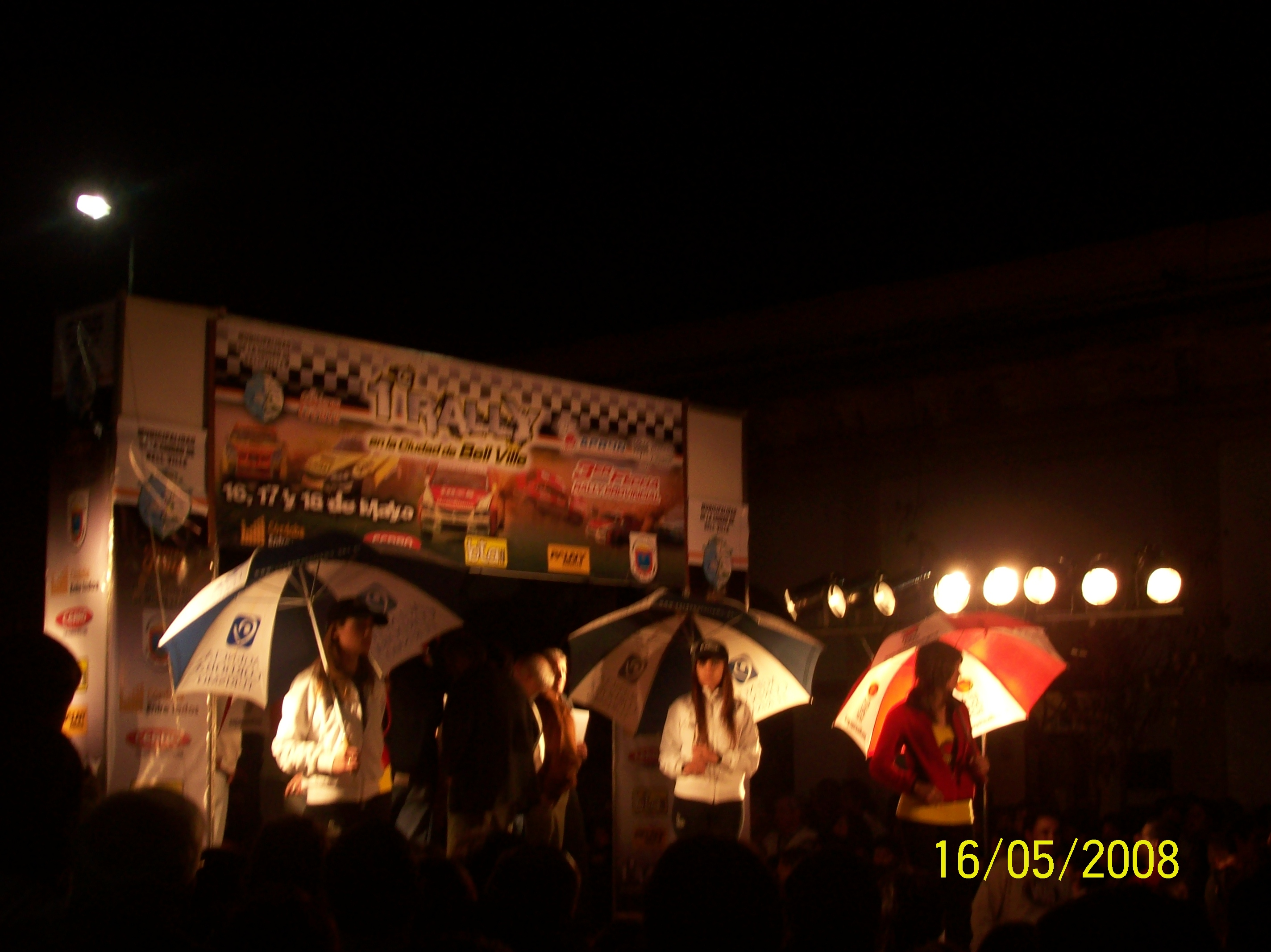
Dia 1, Presentación de Autos e Inaguración del Rally.

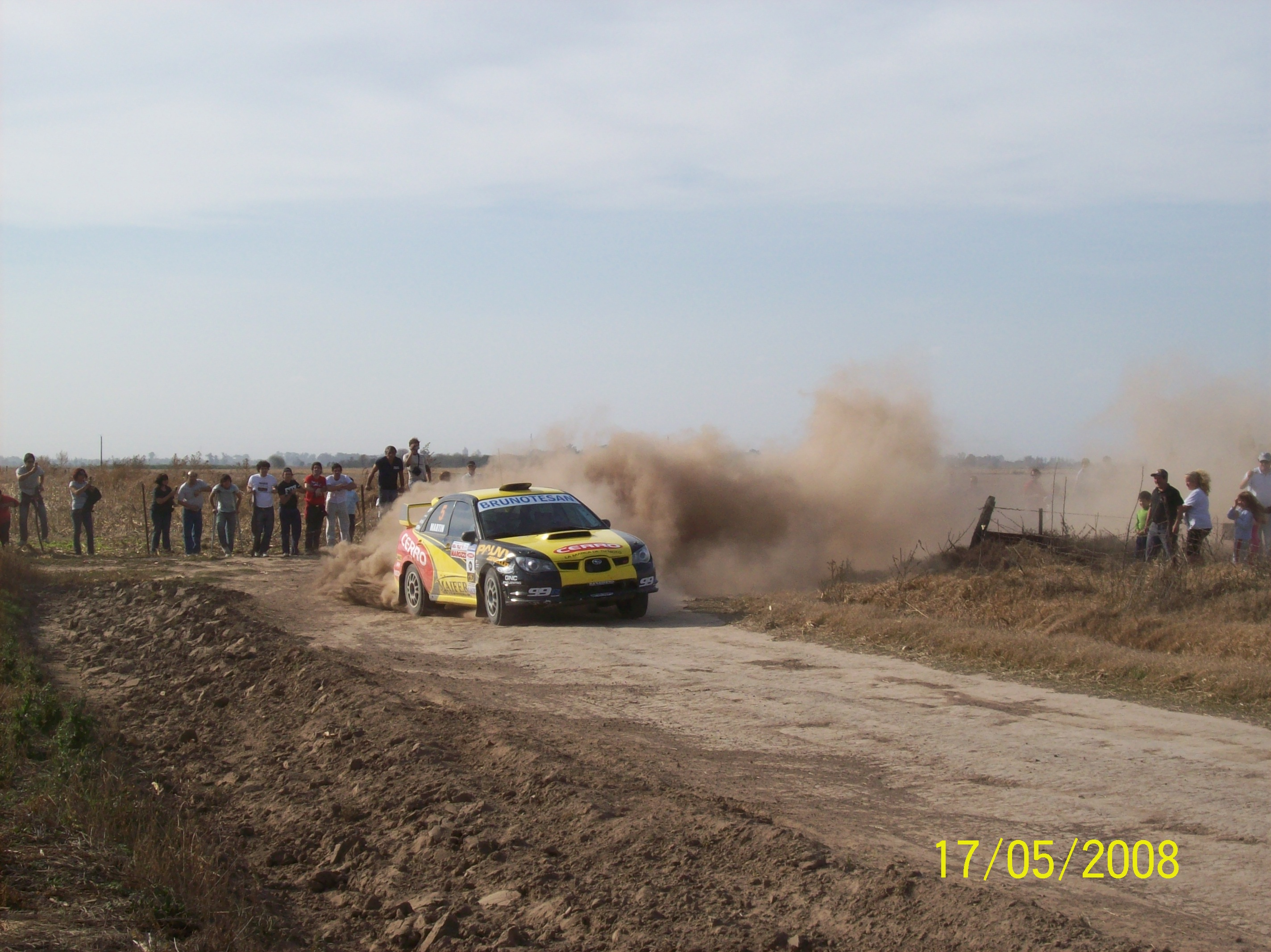
Dia 2, Etapa RP 3 Sur - Camino al Arenal.

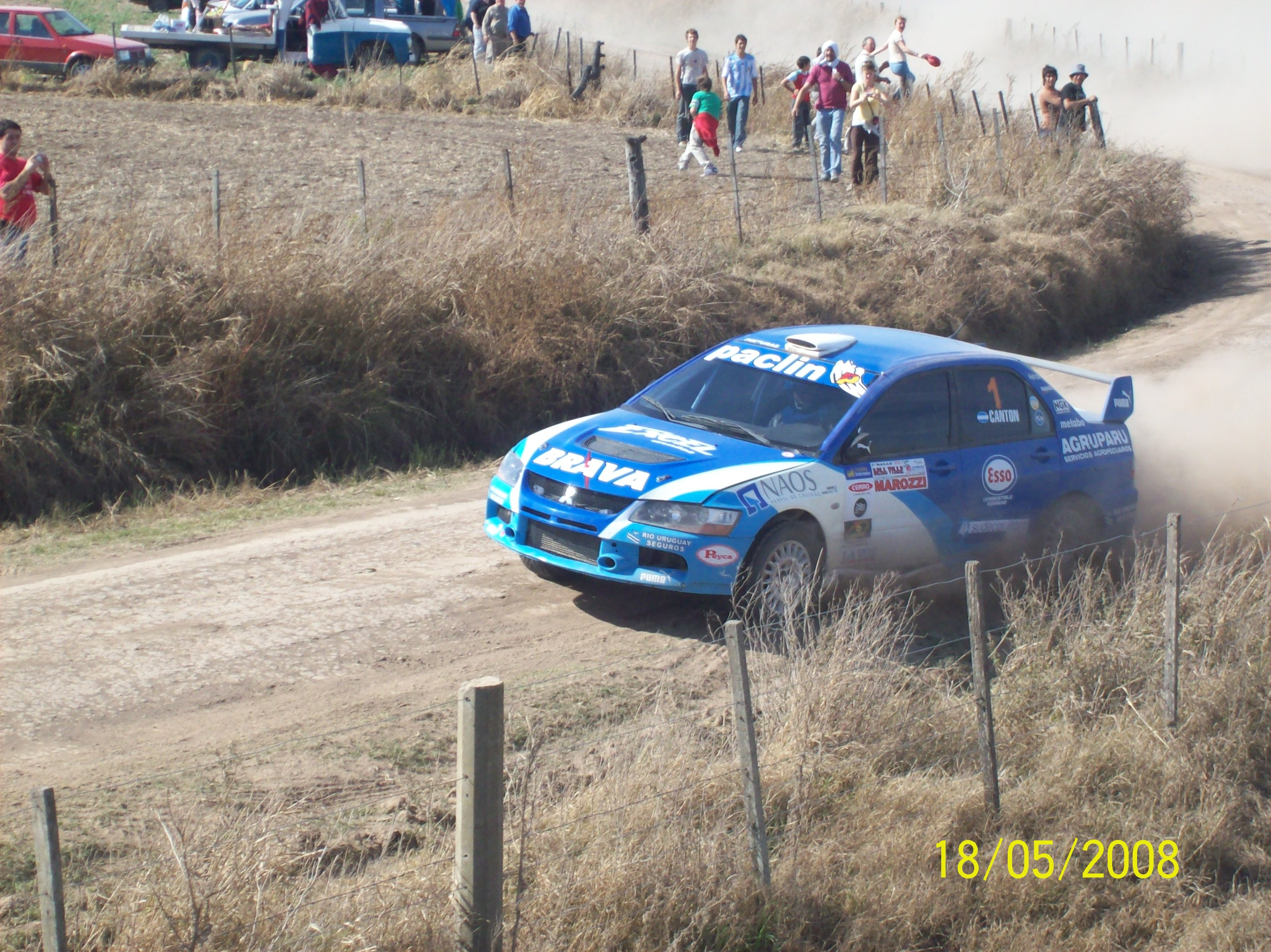
Dia 3, Etapa Fabrica Mainero - RP 3 Norte.

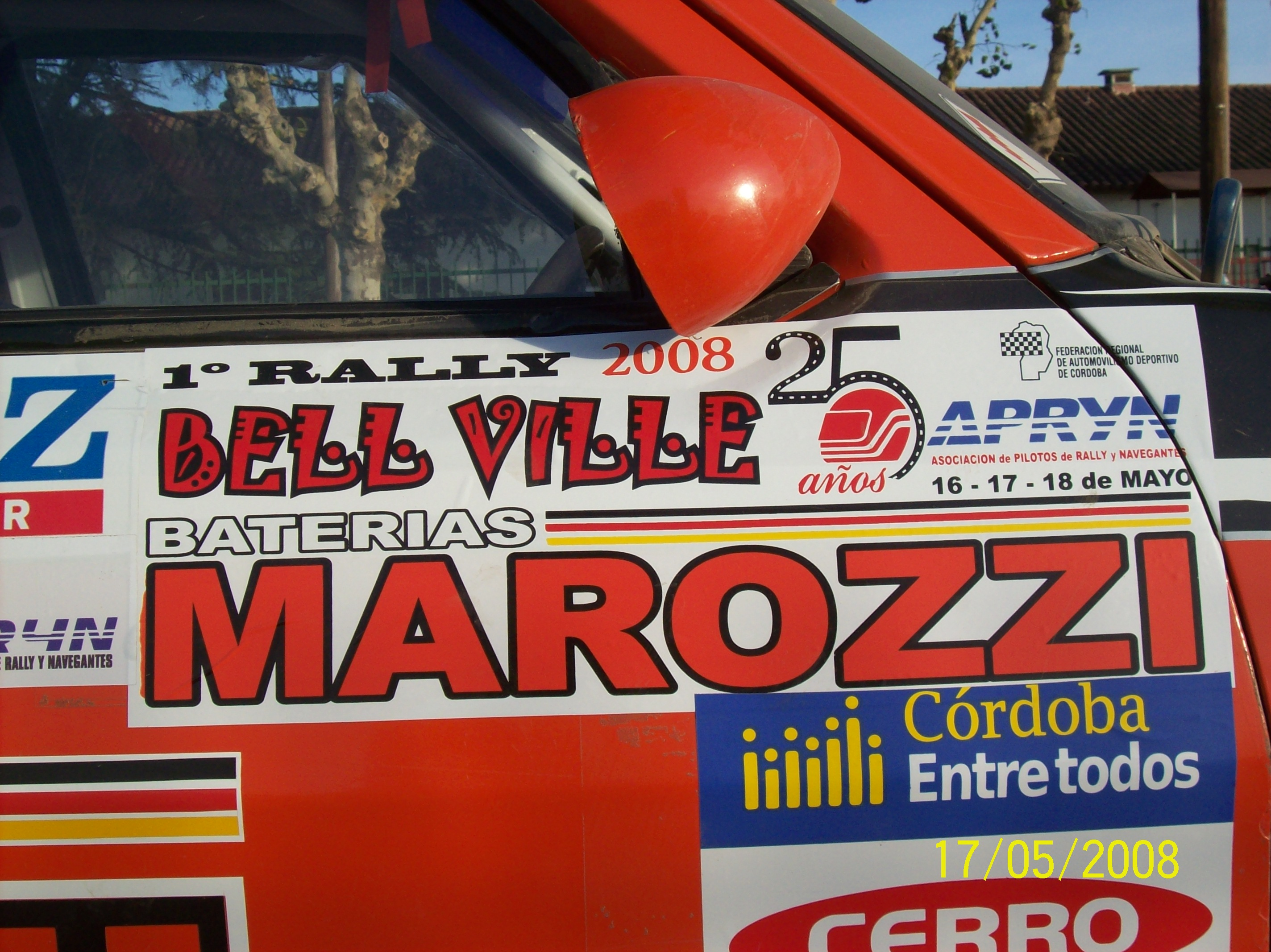
Logotipo.
