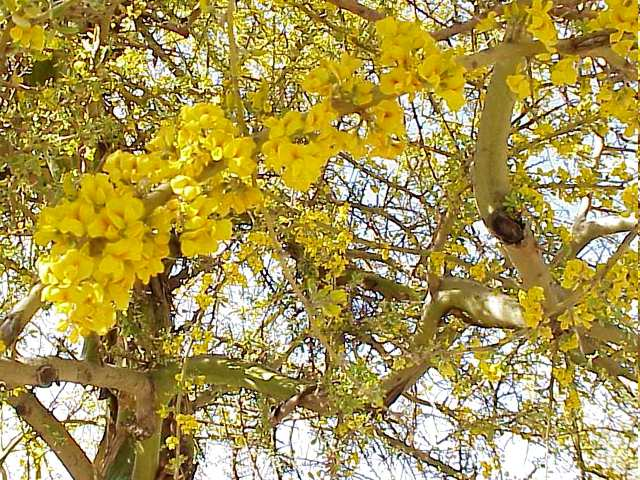
- Flowering Geoffroea decorticans in detail

Scientific classification
- Kingdom: Plantae
- Clade: Embryophytes
- Clade: Tracheophytes
- Clade: Spermatophytes
- Clade: Angiosperms
- Clade: Eudicots
- Clade: Rosids
- Order: Fabales
- Family: Fabaceae
- Subfamily: Faboideae
- Tribe: Dalbergieae
- Genus: Geoffroea; Jacq. (1760)

Type species
- Geoffroea spinosa Jacq.

Species
- Geoffroea decorticans (Gillies ex Hook. & Arn.) Burkart; Geoffroea spinosa Jacq.; Geoffroea subtropicalis (Lillo) Mart.Carr.
- Key: Range of Geoffroea decorticans. Range of Geoffroea spinosa.

Synonyms
- Geoffraea L. (1763), orth. var.; Gourliea Gillies ex Hook. & Arn.(1833); Umari Adans. (1763)

= Geoffroea =

Genus of legumes

Geoffroea is a rather small genus of wild spiny shrubs or small trees of tropical and subtropical South America. Although it gathers few species, they are highly extended geographically throughout the subcontinent. Each species is well known in its local area, as seen from the varied (and mostly domestic) usage of these trees as food, timber, or fuel. It was recently assigned to the informal monophyletic Pterocarpus clade within the Dalbergieae.
