= Graciela Fernández Meijide =

Argentine human rights activist (born 1931)

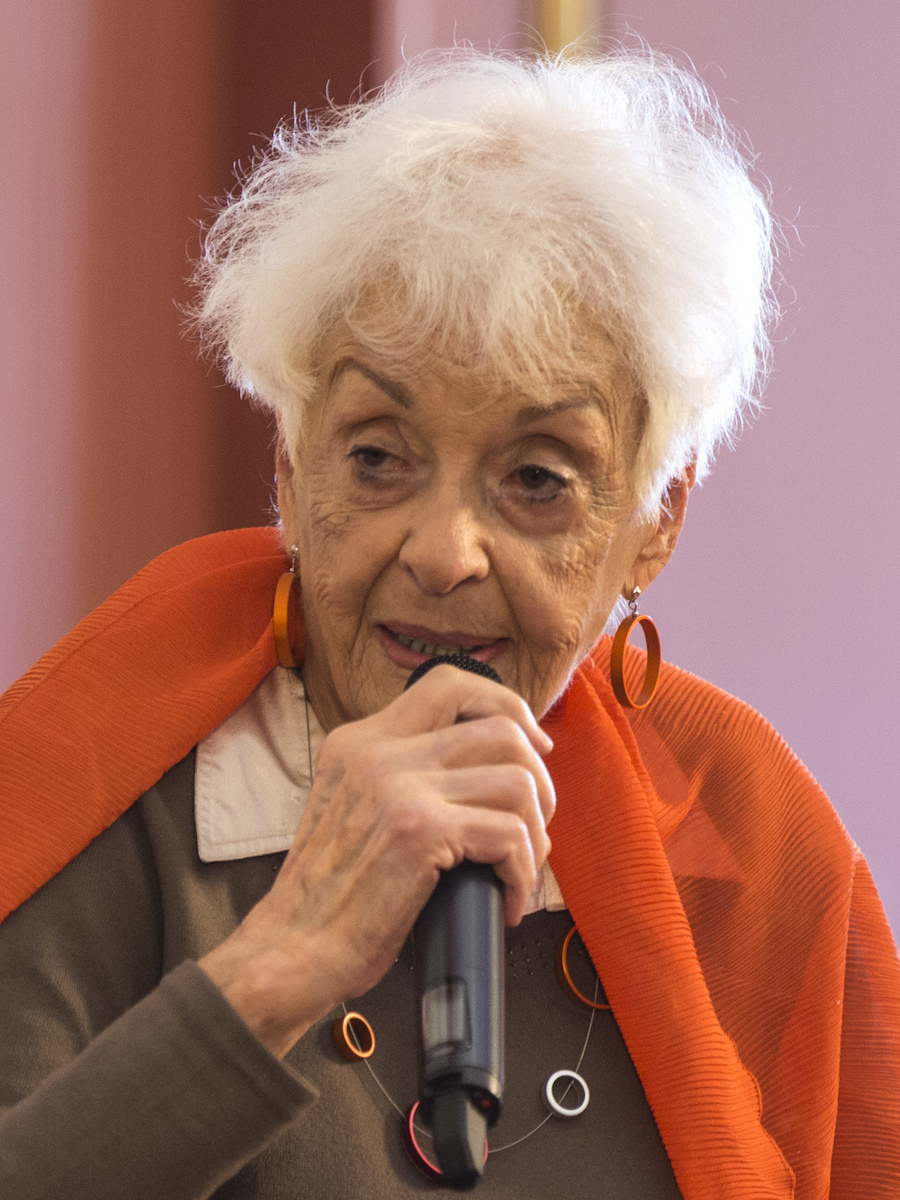
- Fernández Meijide in 2016

Minister of Social Development and the Environment of Argentina
- In office 10 December 1999 – 12 March 2001
- President: Fernando de la Rúa
- Preceded by: Alberto Mazza
- Succeeded by: Marcos Makón

National Deputy
- In office 10 December 1997 – 10 December 1999
- Constituency: Buenos Aires Province
- In office 10 December 1993 – 10 December 1995
- Constituency: Buenos Aires

National Senator
- In office 10 December 1995 – 10 December 1997
- Constituency: Buenos Aires

Personal details
- Born: Rosa Graciela Castagnola; 27 February 1931 (age 95) Avellaneda, Buenos Aires Province, Argentina
- Party: Broad Front (1993–2001)
- Other political affiliations: Front for a Country in Solidarity (1994–1997); Alliance (1997–2001)
- Spouse: Enrique Fernández Meijide
- Education: Instituto de Enseñanza Superior en Lenguas Vivas Juan Ramón Fernández
- Profession: Foreign language teacher and human rights activist

Rosa Graciela Castagnola de Fernández Meijide (born 27 February 1931), better known as Graciela Fernández Meijide, is an Argentine teacher, human rights activist and politician. She came to prominence by investigating the forced disappearances of thousands of people during the Dirty War. She later served as a deputy, senator, and government minister for the FrePaSo party.

== Biography ==
Graciela Castagnola was born in 1931 in Avellaneda just south of Buenos Aires, where she met her husband, Enrique Fernández Meijide, at a young age. They had a daughter and two sons. She was educated at the Instituto de Enseñanza Superior en Lenguas Vivas Juan Ramón Fernández [es] in Retiro, Buenos Aires, and worked as a French language teacher.

On 23 October 1976, Fernández Meijide's 16-year-old son, Pablo, was taken by the authorities in a night-time raid on the family apartment, along with his girlfriend, María Zimmermann, in what appears to be a case of mistaken identity (the girl's former boyfriend was a student activist also named Pablo). His parents were told that he could be picked up from the Police Station in the morning, but neither Pablo or his girlfriend were seen again by their families.

Fernández Meijide campaigned for the rights of the families of the disappeared during the Dirty War of the 1970s. She joined the Permanent Assembly for Human Rights and went into exile in Montreal, Canada, in 1978.

At the return of democracy in 1983, she was appointed to head the depositions department of the National Commission on the Disappearance of Persons (CONADEP).

=== Political career ===
Although Fernández Meijide was approached by several parties after her high-profile work, it was not until the creation of the centre-left Broad Front that she started a political career, having seen the passing into law of the controversial 'Pardon Laws' (the Ley de Obediencia Debida and the Ley de Punto Final) that effectively ended further prosecution for those responsible for human rights abuses during the National Reorganization Process dictatorship (1976–83). She stood as a candidate for the Argentine Chamber of Deputies in 1991 on the centre-left Broad Front ticket, albeit without success.

Fernández Meijide was first elected to the Argentine Congress in 1993 as a Deputy for the City of Buenos Aires on the newly formed FrePaSo (Front for a Country in Solidarity) ticket. She was elected to the Argentine Senate in 1995 for the city, gaining the most votes ever for a woman in Argentina. During this time the newly formed FrePaSo's popularity and her own grew.

In 1997, she resigned her seat in the Senate and was elected a deputy once again – now for Buenos Aires Province – in a resounding victory over Justicialist Chiche Duhalde, greatly increasing her profile. FrePaSo joined with the Radical Civic Union (UCR) and several provincial parties to create the Alianza in opposition to President Carlos Menem, and she led the Alianza party list to a majority in the Lower House in the 1997 mid-term elections.

Ahead of the 1999 elections, Fernández Meijide ran in the Alianza presidential primary against UCR Senator Fernando de la Rúa, to whom she lost, despite having been the front-runner in many polls. She then declined to be de la Rúa's running mate on the ticket. She instead announced her candidacy for Governor of Buenos Aires Province; she lost to Justicialist Party nominee Carlos Ruckauf by 7 points.

De la Rúa, on the other hand, was elected President, and he appointed Fernández Meijide to his cabinet as Minister of Social Development and Environment. She was unable to put many of her social plans into action, however, due to lack of funds, and her popularity waned as the public's impatience grew. In a 2001 cabinet reshuffle brought on by economic and social crisis, the president made her deputy chief of cabinet; she however resigned after a few days in protest at the government's economic policies.

De la Rúa's government and the Alianza subsequently collapsed in 2001, after which both the UCR and FrePaSo backed the congressionally-appointed presidency of Eduardo Duhalde to remedy the country's economic crisis. Fernández Meijide afterward retired from active politics.

In 2009, Fernández Meijide wrote La historia íntima de los Derechos Humanos en la Argentina (Intimate History of Human Rights in Argentina), in which she recounts her personal experiences in the human rights movement during and after the dictatorship.

In 2020, Graciela Fernández Meijide received an honorary doctorate from Siglo 21 University. In June 2023, she was awarded another Doctor Honoris Causa by the University of Buenos Aires (UBA).

== Books ==
- Fernández Meijide, G. (2020). La historia íntima de los Derechos Humanos en la Argentina [An Intimate History of Human Rights in Argentina (updated edition)] (in Spanish). Buenos Aires: Sudamericana. ISBN 978-9500763943. Review of the original 2009 edition (in Spanish)
- Fernández Meijide, G.; Leis, Héctor Ricardo (2015). El Diálogo (in Spanish). Sudamericana. ISBN 978-9500751285.
- Fernández Meijide, G. (2013). Argentina Tiene Ejemplos: Otro Pais es Posible [Argentina Has Examples: Another Country is Possible] (in Spanish). OTRA. ISBN 978-9507641954.
- Fernández Meijide, G. (2013). Eran Humanos, No Héroes: Crítica de la Violencia Política de los 70 [They Were Humans, Not Heroes: Criticism of the Political Violence of the 70s] (in Spanish). Sudamericana. ISBN 978-9500743242.
- Fernández Meijide, G. (2007). La Ilusión: El Fracaso de la Alianza Vistor Por Dentro (in Spanish). Sudamericana. ISBN 978-950-07-2829-4.
- Fernández Meijide, G. (1997). Derecho a la esperanza [The Right to Have Hope] (in Spanish). Emecé Editores. ISBN 978-9500417679.

== See also ==
- List of former Argentine Senators
