= Martín Payero =

Argentine footballer (born 1998)

Personal information
- Full name: Martín Ismael Payero
- Date of birth: 11 September 1998 (age 28)
- Place of birth: Pascanas, Argentina
- Height: 1.83 m (6 ft 0 in)
- Position: Central midfielder

Team information
- Current team: Watford
- Number: 22

Youth career
- Banfield

Senior career*
Years	Team	Apps	(Gls)
2017–2021	Banfield	37	(1)
2019–2020	→ Talleres (loan)	16	(1)
2021–2023	Middlesbrough	13	(1)
2022–2023	→ Boca Juniors (loan)	25	(5)
2023–2026	Udinese	54	(3)
2025–2026	→ Cremonese (loan)	25	(1)
2026–	Watford	0	(0)

International career^{‡}
2021	Argentina Olympic	3	(0)
- * Club domestic league appearances and goals as of 25 May 2026 ‡ National team caps and goals as of 14:55, 5 August 2021 (UTC)

Martín Ismael Payero (born 11 September 1998) is an Argentinian professional footballer who plays as a central midfielder for EFL Championship club Watford.

== Club career ==
=== Banfield ===
Payero's career started with Banfield. He first appeared in their first-team squad during the Primera División season, making his debut against San Martín on 4 December 2017; being substituted on for Eric Remedi with five minutes remaining. He made three further appearances in 2017–18 before fourteen more occurred in 2018–19. He scored his first senior goal in the latter, netting in a Copa Argentina victory over Juventud Unida on 27 February 2019.

==== Loan to Talleres ====
The succeeding August saw Payero depart on loan to fellow Primera División team Talleres. He scored once, versus Newell's Old Boys, in eighteen matches for them.

=== Middlesbrough ===
On 5 August 2021, Payero joined Championship side Middlesbrough on a three-year deal for around €7 million. On 11 August he made his debut for the club in a cup game against Blackpool which Middlesbrough then lost 3–0. He made his league debut on 14 August against Bristol City Which Middlesbrough went on to win 2–1. He scored his first goal for the club in a 2–0 victory over Cardiff City on 23 October that year. He scored a penalty in the shootout against Manchester United as Middlesbrough knocked them out of the FA Cup on 4 February 2022. Just less than a week later Middlesbrough went to QPR, and Payero came on as a substitute in the 87th minute. Minutes later, he went into a tackle, injured himself, was stretchered off the pitch, and did not make an appearance for the Middlesbrough senior team until the team played Swansea City on 23rd April, where he came on as a 90th-minute substitute for Marcus Tavernier in his last competitive appearance for Middlesbrough.

==== Loan to Boca Juniors ====
On 14 July 2022, Payero returned to Argentina to join Boca Juniors on a season-long loan deal. On 23 October 2022, the 2022 Argentine Primera División ended with Payero's Boca Juniors winning the league title.

=== Udinese ===
On 1 September 2023, Payero joined Serie A club Udinese for a fee believed to be £3 million on a four-year contract with the option of a further 12 months.

==== Loan to Cremonese ====
On 22 August 2025, Payero was loaned by Cremonese, with a conditional obligation to buy.

=== Watford ===
On 31 July 2026, Payero signed for Championship club Watford on a two-year deal for an undisclosed fee.

== International career ==
Payero has previously been called up to train with the Argentina U20 squad. He played in all three of Argentina's matches in the 2020 Summer Olympics.

== Career statistics ==
As of match played 1 December 2025

Appearances and goals by club, season and competition
Club	Season	League			National cup		League cup		Continental		Other		Total	
Club	Season	Division	Apps	Goals	Apps	Goals	Apps	Goals	Apps	Goals	Apps	Goals	Apps	Goals
Banfield	2017–18	Argentine Primera División	4	0	0	0	—		0	0	0	0	4	0
Banfield	2018–19	Argentine Primera División	10	0	2	1	1	0	1 (Note: Appearance(s) in the Copa Sudamericana)	0	0	0	14	1
Banfield	2019–20	Argentine Primera División	1	0	0	0	0	0	—		0	0	1	0
Banfield	2020–21	Argentine Primera División	12	1	2	0	0	0	—		0	0	14	1
Banfield	2021	Argentine Primera División	10	0	0	0	0	0	—		0	0	10	0
Banfield	Total		37	1	4	1	1	0	1	0	0	0	43	2
Talleres (loan)	2019–20	Argentine Primera División	16	1	2	0	0	0	—		0	0	18	1
Middlesbrough	2021–22	EFL Championship	13	1	1	0	1	0	—		0	0	15	1
Middlesbrough	2023–24	EFL Championship	0	0	0	0	1	0	—		0	0	1	0
Middlesbrough	Total		13	1	1	0	2	0	0	0	0	0	16	1
Boca Juniors (loan)	2022	Argentine Primera División	15	1	2	0	0	0	—		0	0	17	1
Boca Juniors (loan)	2023	Argentine Primera División	10	4	1	0	–		4	0	–		15	4
Boca Juniors (loan)	Total		25	5	3	0	0	0	4	0	0	0	32	5
Udinese	2023–24	Serie A	29	2	—		—		—		—		29	2
Udinese	2024–25	Serie A	25	1	2	0	—		—		—		27	1
Udinese	Total		54	3	2	0	0	0	0	0	0	0	56	3
Cremonese (loan)	2025–26	Serie A	10	1	0	0	—		—		—		10	1
Career total			155	12	12	1	3	0	5	0	0	0	175	13

== Honours ==
Boca Juniors

- Primera División: 2022
- Supercopa Argentina: 2022
