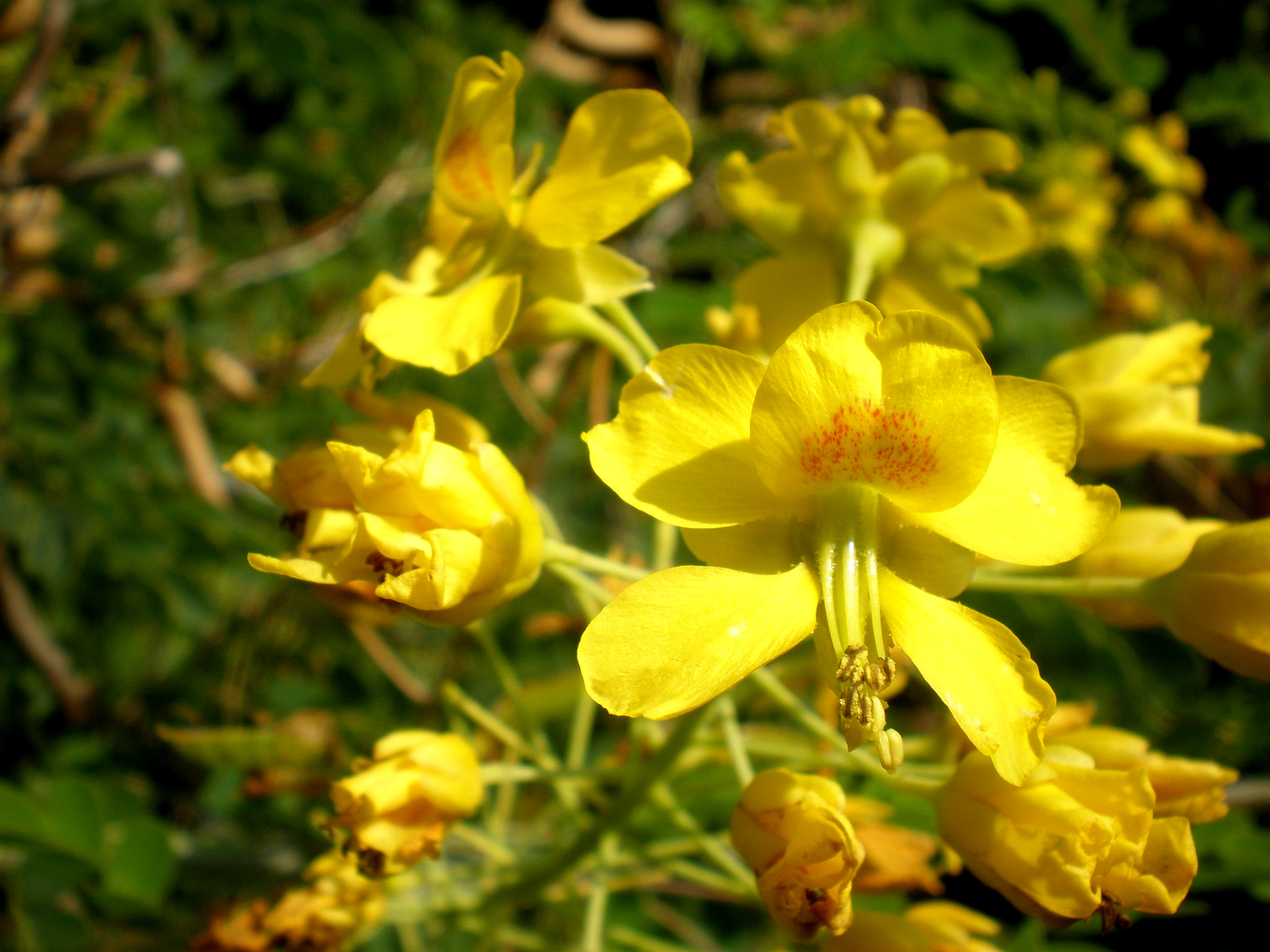

Scientific classification
- Kingdom: Plantae
- Clade: Tracheophytes
- Clade: Angiosperms
- Clade: Eudicots
- Clade: Rosids
- Order: Fabales
- Family: Fabaceae
- Subfamily: Caesalpinioideae
- Genus: Erythrostemon
- Species: E. mexicanus

Binomial name
- Erythrostemon mexicanus (A.Gray 1861) E. Gagnon & G. P. Lewis 2016
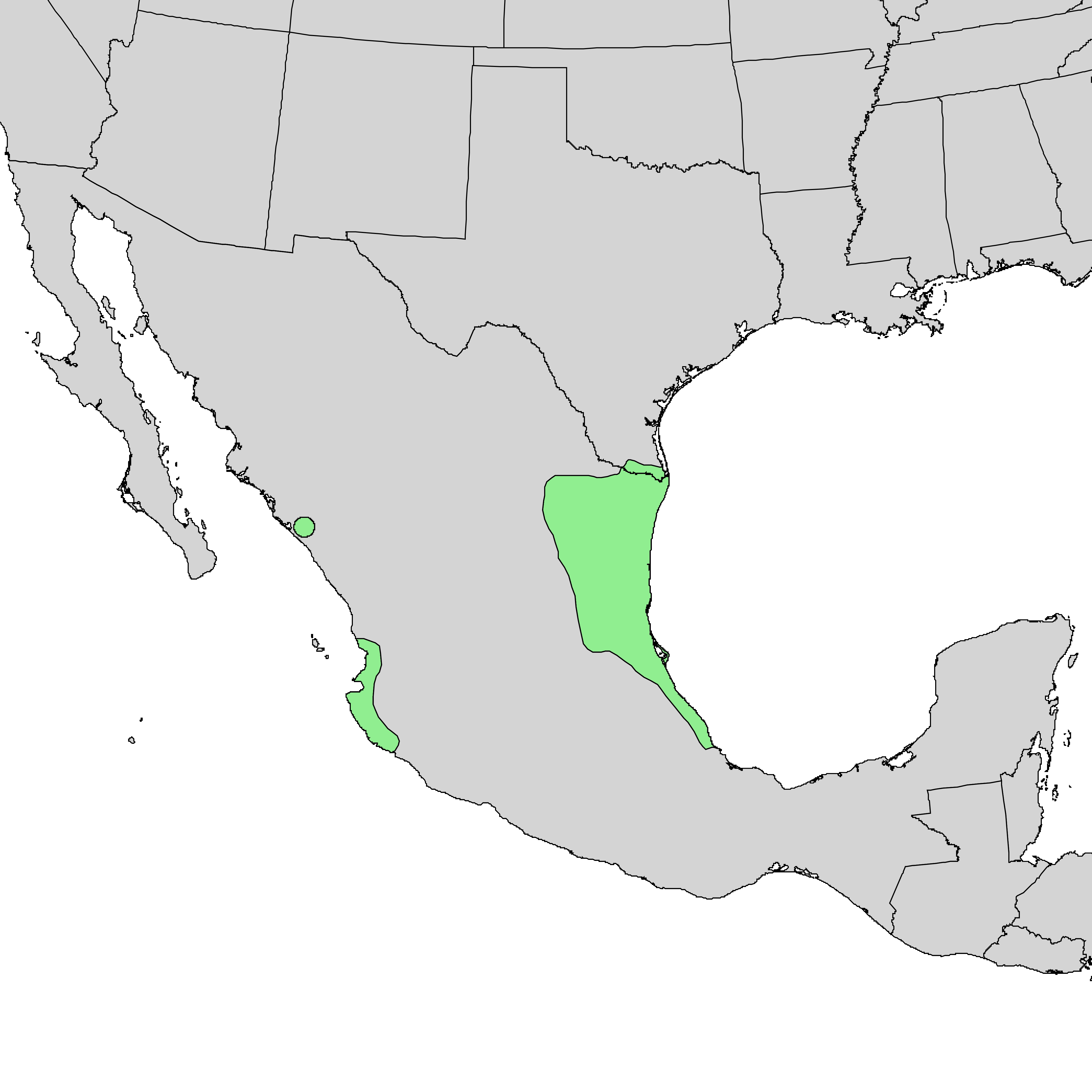
- Natural range

Synonyms
- Caesalpinia mexicana A.Gray 1861; Poinciana mexicana (A.Gray) Rose 1911; Poincianella mexicana (A.Gray) Britton & Rose 1930

= Erythrostemon mexicanus =

Species of legume

Erythrostemon mexicanus, formerly Caesalpinia mexicana, is a species of plant in the genus Erythrostemon, within the pea family, Fabaceae. Common names include Mexican Bird of Paradise, Mexican holdback, Mexican caesalpinia, and tabachín del monte. It is native to the extreme lower Rio Grande Valley of Texas and to parts of Mexico: in the northeast and further south along the Gulf coast as well as the Pacific coast in Nayarit, Jalisco, Colima, and a small portion of Sinaloa.

== Description ==
Mexican holdback is a small evergreen tree or large shrub, reaching a height of 3–4.6 m (9.8–15.1 ft) and a spread of 1.8–3 m (5.9–9.8 ft). Leaves are bipinnately-compound and dark green. Each leaf has five to nine pinnae 4–9 cm (1.6–3.5 in) in length. Pinnae are composed of four to five leaflets that are 1–2.5 cm (0.39–0.98 in) long and 0.7–1.3 cm (0.28–0.51 in) wide. Yellow, slightly fragrant flowers are produced on 7.6–15.2 cm (3.0–6.0 in) terminal spikes of 10 to 30. Blooming takes place from February to July, often continuing to October. The fruit is a dehiscent tan or yellow seedpod 5.1–7.6 cm (2.0–3.0 in) in length.

== Uses ==
Mexican holdback is cultivated as an ornamental because of its showy flowers, lush, fine-textured foliage, and drought tolerance.

== Ecology ==
Erythrostemon mexicanus is the host plant for the caterpillars of the curve-winged metalmark (Emesis emesia).
