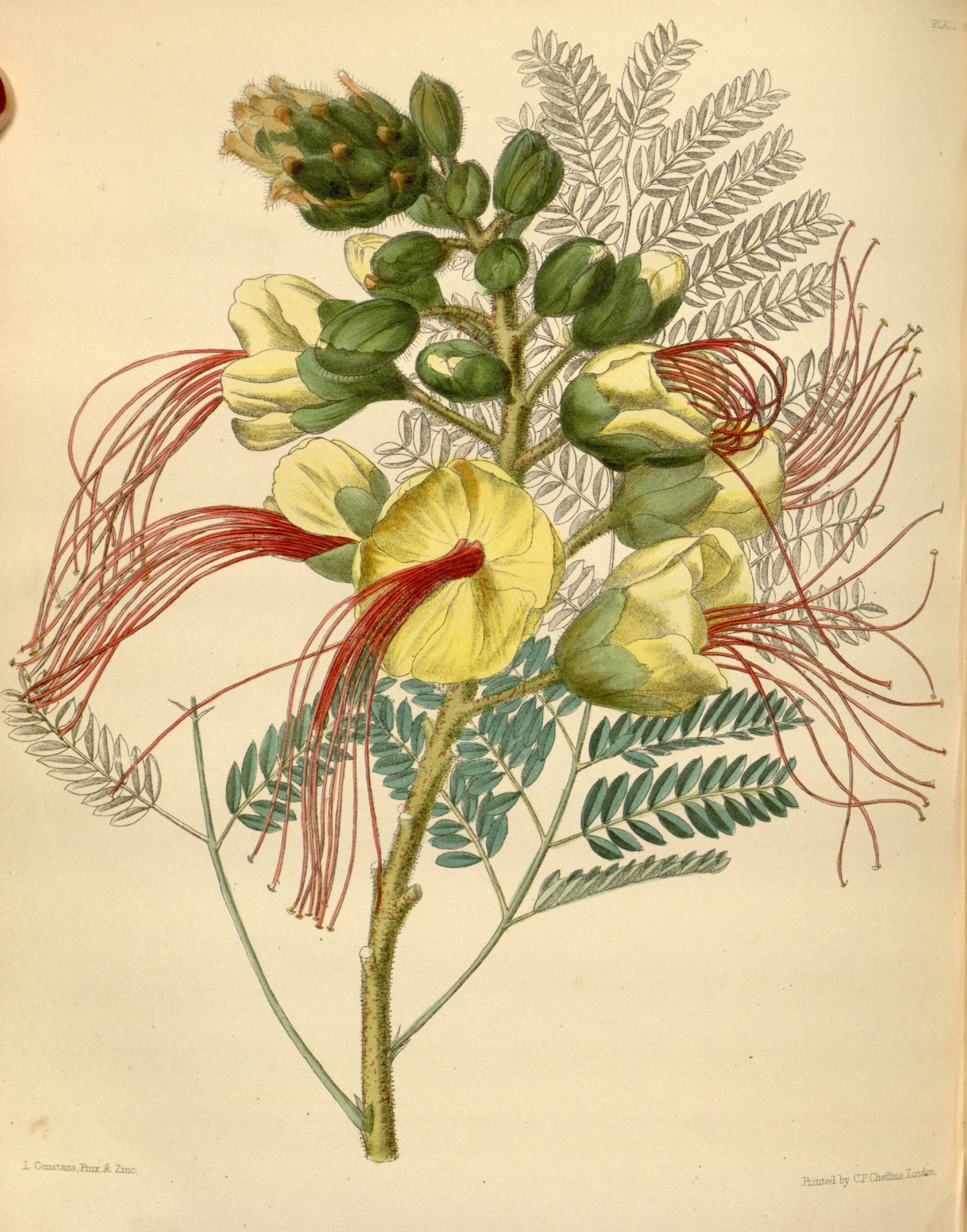
- Erythrostemin gilliesii

Scientific classification
- Kingdom: Plantae
- Clade: Tracheophytes
- Clade: Angiosperms
- Clade: Eudicots
- Clade: Rosids
- Order: Fabales
- Family: Fabaceae
- Subfamily: Caesalpinioideae
- Tribe: Caesalpinieae
- Genus: Erythrostemon (Klotzsch 1844) E. Gagnon & G. P. Lewis 2016

Type species
- Erythrostemon gilliesii (Hook.) Klotzsch.

Species
- See text

Synonyms
- Poincianella Britton & Rose 1930; Schrammia Britton & Rose 1930

= Erythrostemon =

Genus of legumes

Erythrostemon is a genus of flowering plants in the legume family, Fabaceae. Its native range is tropical & subtropical America.

== Species ==
Erythrostemon comprises the following species:

- Erythrostemon acapulcensis (Standl.) E. Gagnon & G. P. Lewis
- Erythrostemon angulatus (Hook. & Arn.) E. Gagnon & G. P. Lewis
- Erythrostemon argentinus (Burkart) E. Gagnon & G. P. Lewis
- Erythrostemon caladenia (Standl.) E. Gagnon & G. P. Lewis
- Erythrostemon calycinus (Benth.) L. P. Queiroz
- Erythrostemon caudatus (A. Gray) E. Gagnon & G. P. Lewis—Tailed nicker
- Erythrostemon coccineus (G. P. Lewis & J. L. Contr.) E. Gagnon & G. P. Lewis
- Erythrostemon coluteifolius (Griseb.) E. Gagnon & G. P. Lewis
- Erythrostemon coulterioides (Griseb. emend. Burkart) E. Gagnon & G. P. Lewis
- Erythrostemon epifanioi (J. L. Contr.) E. Gagnon & G. P. Lewis
- Erythrostemon exilifolius (Griseb.) E. Gagnon & G. P. Lewis
- Erythrostemon exostemma (DC.) E. Gagnon & G. P. Lewis
  - subsp. exostemma (DC.) E. Gagnon & G. P. Lewis
  - subsp. tampicoanus (Britton & Rose) E. Gagnon & G. P. Lewis
- Erythrostemon fimbriatus (Tul.) E. Gagnon & G. P. Lewis
- Erythrostemon gilliesii (Hook.) Klotzsch—Bird of paradise
- Erythrostemon glandulosus (Bertero ex DC.) E. Gagnon & G. P. Lewis
- Erythrostemon hintonii (Sandwith) E. Gagnon & G. P. Lewis
- Erythrostemon hughesii (G. P. Lewis) E. Gagnon & G. P. Lewis
- Erythrostemon laxus (Benth.) E. Gagnon & G. P. Lewis
- Erythrostemon macvaughii (J. L. Contr. & G. P. Lewis) E. Gagnon & G. P. Lewis
- Erythrostemon melanadenius (Rose) E. Gagnon & G. P. Lewis
- Erythrostemon mexicanus (A. Gray) E. Gagnon & G. P. Lewis—Mexican holdback (southernmost Texas, Mexico)
- Erythrostemon nelsonii (Britton & Rose) E. Gagnon & G. P. Lewis
- Erythrostemon nicaraguensis (G. P. Lewis) E. Gagnon & G. P. Lewis
- Erythrostemon oyamae (Sotuyo & G. P. Lewis) E. Gagnon & G. P. Lewis
- Erythrostemon palmeri (S. Watson) E. Gagnon & G. P. Lewis
- Erythrostemon pannosus (Brandegee) E. Gagnon & G. P. Lewis
- Erythrostemon phyllanthoides (Standl.) E. Gagnon & G. P. Lewis—Wait-a-bit vine
- Erythrostemon placidus (Brandegee) E. Gagnon & G. P. Lewis
- Erythrostemon robinsonianus (Britton & Rose) E. Gagnon & G. P. Lewis
- Erythrostemon standleyi (Britton & Rose) E. Gagnon & G. P. Lewis
- Erythrostemon yucatanensis (Greenm.) E. Gagnon & G. P. Lewis
  - subsp. chiapensis (G. P. Lewis) E. Gagnon & G. P. Lewis
  - subsp. hondurensis (G. P. Lewis) E. Gagnon & G. P. Lewis
  - subsp. yucatanensis (Greenm.) E. Gagnon & G. P. Lewis
