= Unión Department =

Unión Department Departamento Unión
- Department
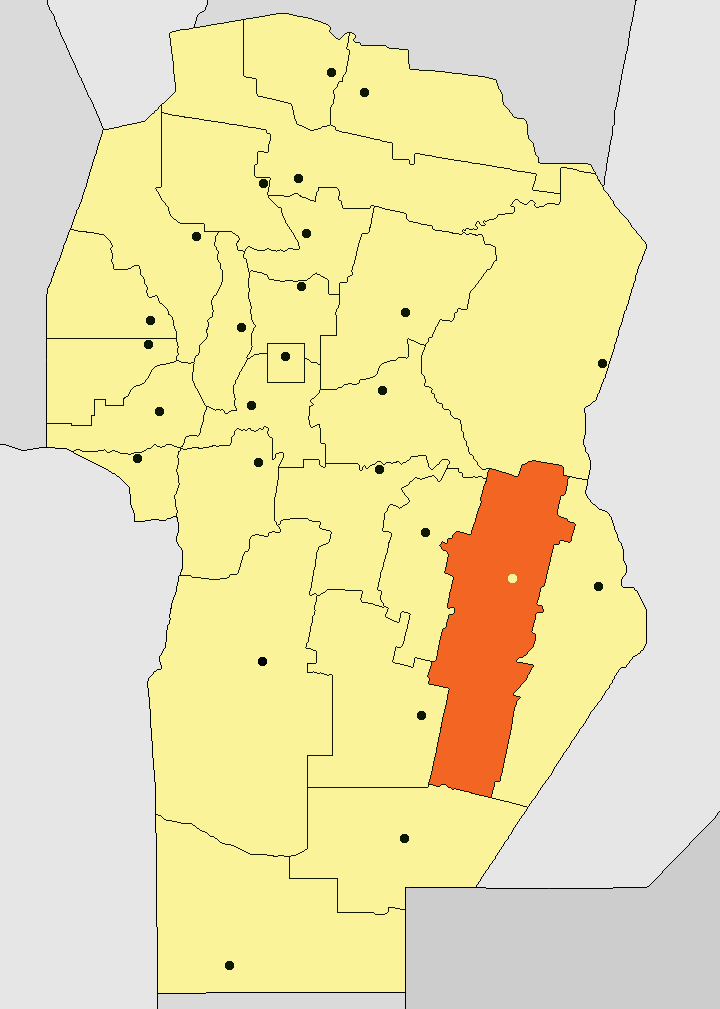
- Location of Unión Department in Córdoba Province
- Coordinates: 32°38′S 62°46′W
- Country: Argentina
- Province: Córdoba
- Foundation: 16 November 1888
- Founder: provincial law
- Capital: Bell Ville

Area
  - Total: 11,182 km^{2} (4,317 sq mi)

Population (2001 census [INDEC])
  - Total: 100,247
  - Density: 8.9650/km^{2} (23.219/sq mi)
  - Pop. change (1991-2001): 4.08%
- Time zone: UTC-3 (ART)
- Postal code: X2550
- Dialing code: 03534
- Distances to
- Buenos Aires: 513 km (319 mi)
- Córdoba: 205 km (127 mi)

Unión Department is a department of Córdoba Province in Argentina.

The provincial subdivision has a population of about 100,247 inhabitants in an area of 11,182 km², and its capital city is Bell Ville, which is located around 513 km from the Capital federal.

== Settlements ==
- Aldea Santa María
- Alto Alegre
- Ana Zumarán
- Ballesteros
- Ballesteros Sud
- Bell Ville
- Gould
- Canals
- Chilibroste
- Cintra
- Colonia Bismarck
- Colonia Bremen
- Idiazábal
- Justiniano Posse
- Laborde
- Monte Leña
- Monte Maíz
- Morrison
- Noetinger
- Ordóñez
- Pascanas
- Pueblo Italiano
- San Antonio de Litín
- San Marcos Sud
- Viamonte
- Villa Los Patos
- Wenceslao Escalante
