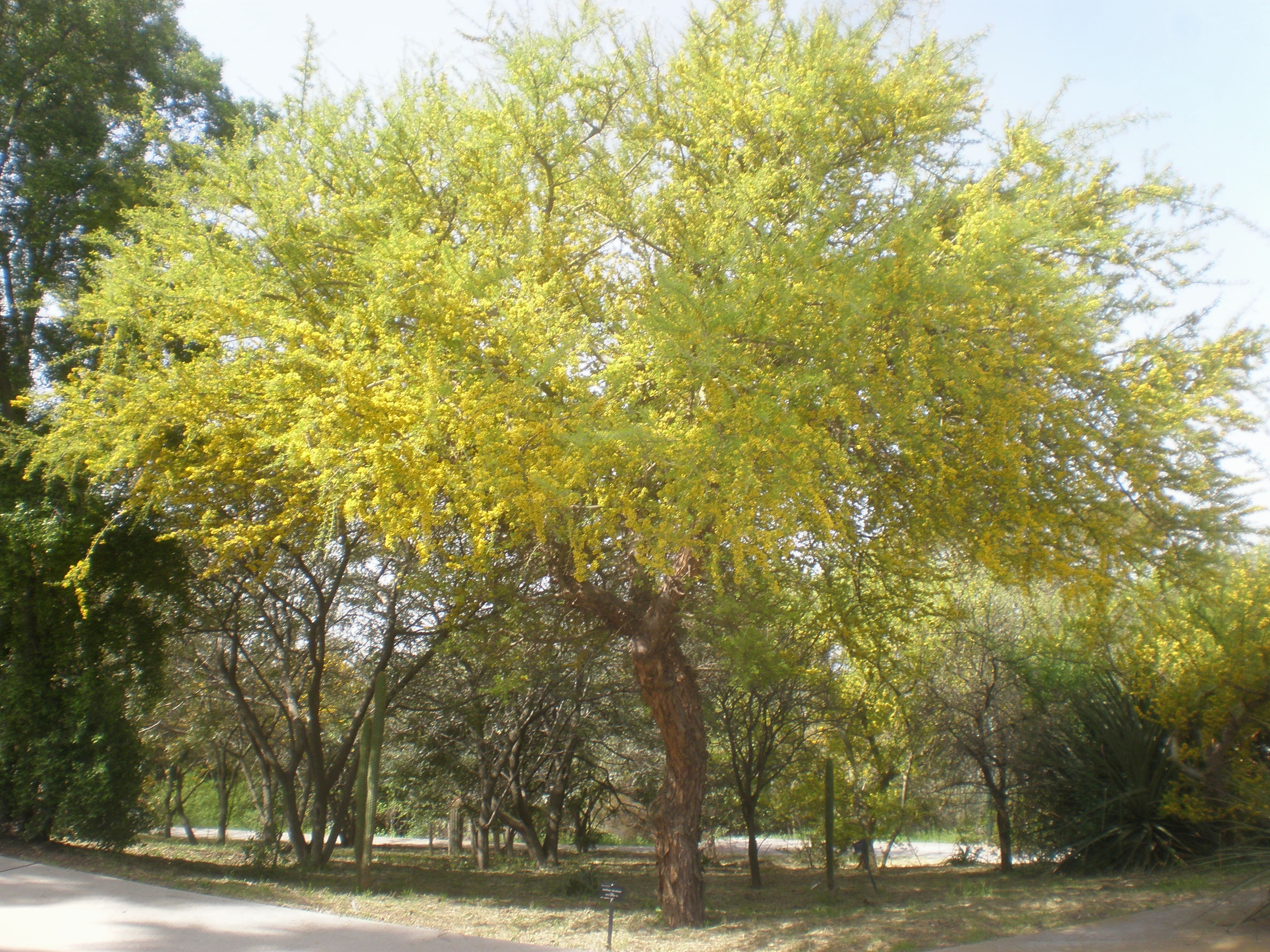
- Geoffroea decorticans in bloom.

Scientific classification
- Kingdom: Plantae
- Clade: Tracheophytes
- Clade: Angiosperms
- Clade: Eudicots
- Clade: Rosids
- Order: Fabales
- Family: Fabaceae
- Subfamily: Faboideae
- Genus: Geoffroea
- Species: G. decorticans

Binomial name
- Geoffroea decorticans (Gillies ex Hook. & Arn.) Burkart
- Range of Geoffroea decorticans.

Synonyms
- Gourliea decorticans var. subtropicalis Lillo; Geoffroea decorticans var. subtropicalis (Lillo) Burkart; Geoffroya spinosa (Molina) M. de Moussy; Gourliea spinosa (Molina) Skeels; Gourliea chilensis Clos; Gourliea decorticans Gillies ex Hook. & Arn.; Gourliea decorticata Walp.; Lucuma spinosa Molina

= Geoffroea decorticans =

Species of plant

Geoffroea decorticans, the chañar, kumbaru, or Chilean palo verde (green wood), is a small deciduous tree, up to 8 meters (25 ft) tall that inhabits most arid forests (montes or espinales) of southern South America. The chañar is cold and drought deciduous; it loses its leaves in winter, and possibly in summer if conditions get too dry. It is native to Bolivia, Chile, Argentina, also present in Paraguay and southern Peru. It is a very characteristic tree in local culture and folk because of its vivid visual presence, propagation, and ancient ethnomedical uses.

== Morphology ==
The common name Chilean palo verde comes from the mottled green color of the trunks but does not seriously resemble Cercidium. The chañar tends to be quite upright with a spreading canopy with both straight and mildly curving trunks. As trees mature the trunks and branches take on a sculptural quality with long longitudinal, irregular ridges and valleys. Along with this undulating trunk, large flakes of the bark peel off or decorticate (hence the species name decorticans). The peeling tan to brown bark is eventually shed revealing the dark green, "immature" trunk beneath. The contrasting colors and textures created by this puzzle-piece pattern make the tree visually fascinating.

The flowers are very visible, small, papery and yellow-coloured. The tree flowers in spring, either singly or in clusters. Geoffroea decorticans is unique among legumes in that it produces fleshy, oval pods that hold a single seed. Fruit are initially green but turn deep orange as they mature.

== Distribution and habitat ==
The tree inhabits dry to arid spiniferous forests in a rather broad area of southern South America which extends mainly through I to IV regions of Chile and central and northern Argentina and throughout highland Bolivia, though it is also found in Paraguay, Peru and Uruguay. Its companions conforming the forest are usually algarrobos, quebrachos, and the related and very abundant cavens. The species is in some areas associated with woody plant encroachment.

In Chile, G. decorticans grows in USDA climate zones 8b to 10, and withstands short frosts as low as –13 °C. The latter is the record low temperature for Santiago del Estero, Argentina, where G. decorticans occurs naturally. It is adapted to desert conditions and can withstand temperatures in excess of 40 °C.

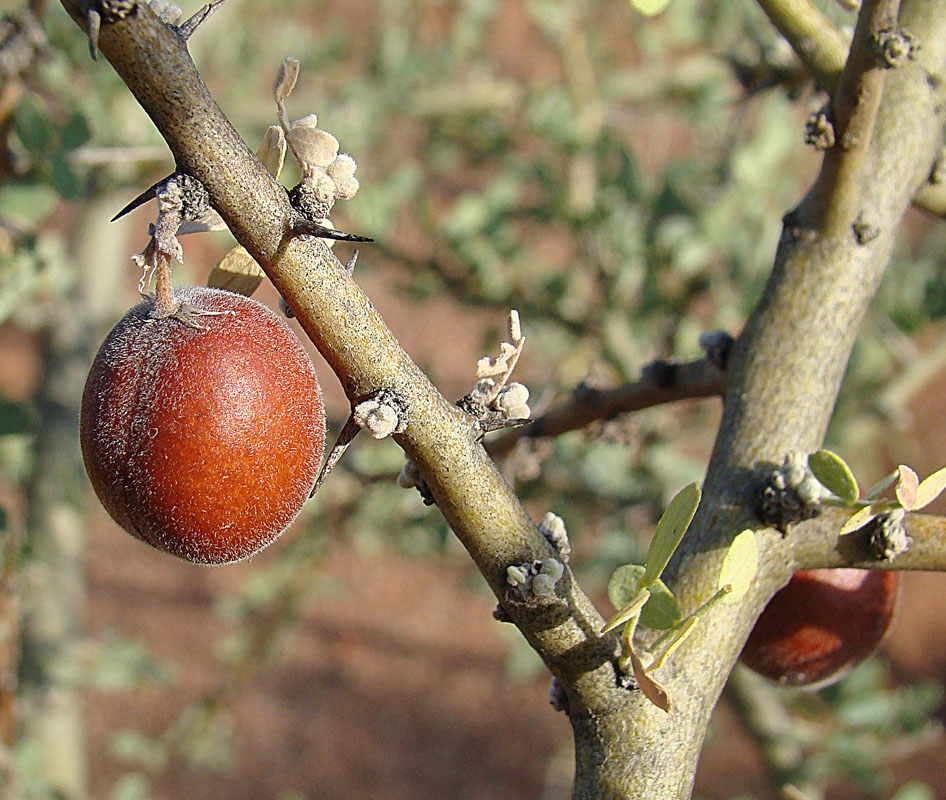
Mature fruits.

== Usage ==
The seeds and fruit, being edible, are valued as human and animal feed, and the yellow wood is suitable for carpentry and furniture making once dry. It is also used as fuel and to make cheap posts for fences. The fruits are very commonly used for both culinary and medical purposes in the processed form of chañar arrope. Extremely sweet, dark and thick, this is very similar to honey or vegetable molasses and is used in their place. It is locally known to alleviate sore throats and coughing.
