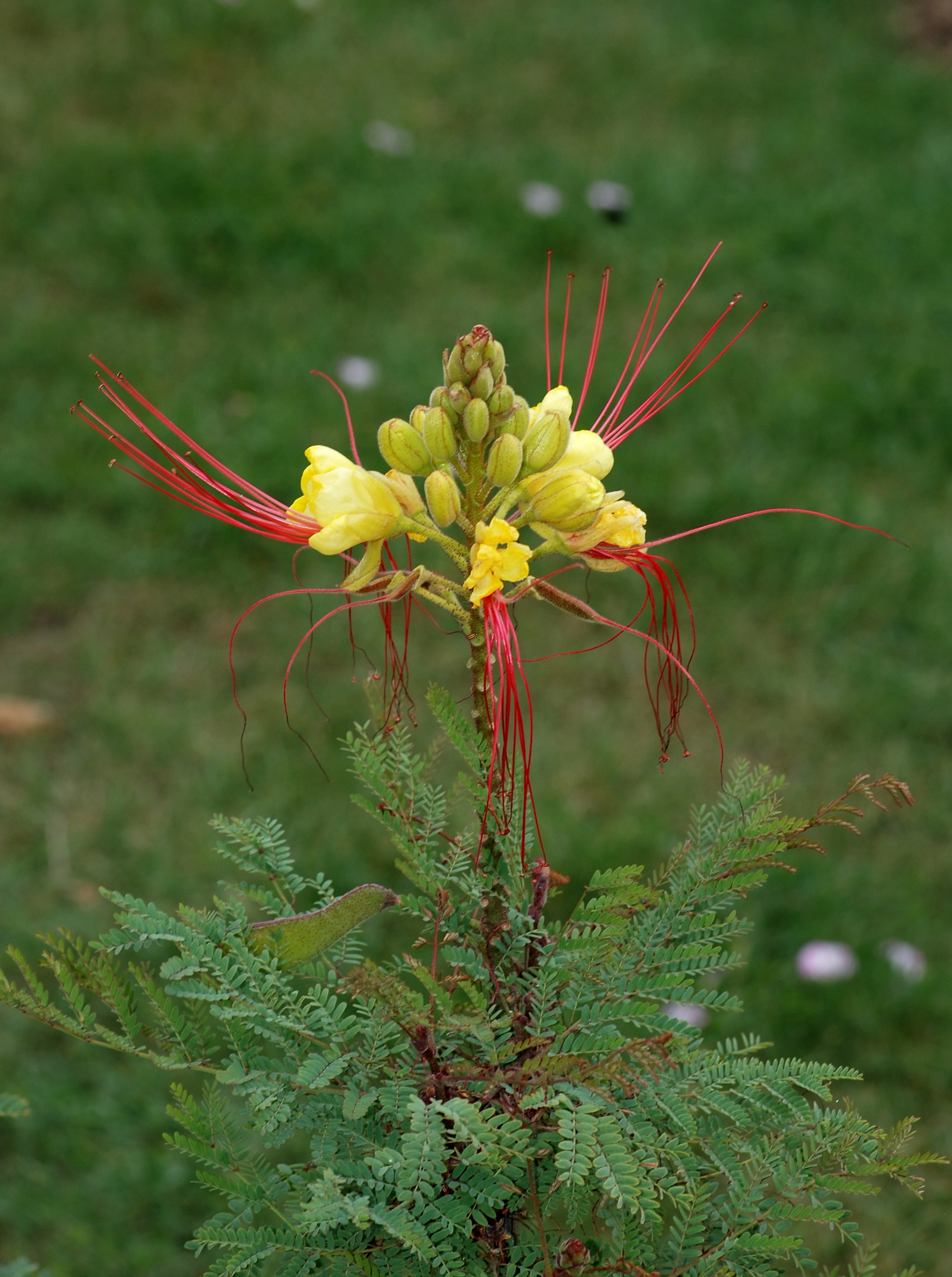

Scientific classification
- Kingdom: Plantae
- Clade: Embryophytes
- Clade: Tracheophytes
- Clade: Spermatophytes
- Clade: Angiosperms
- Clade: Eudicots
- Clade: Rosids
- Order: Fabales
- Family: Fabaceae
- Subfamily: Caesalpinioideae
- Genus: Erythrostemon
- Species: E. gilliesii

Binomial name
- Erythrostemon gilliesii (Hook. 1829) Klotzsch 1844

Synonyms
- Caesalpinia gilliesii (Hook. 1829) D. Dietr. 1840; Poinciana gilliesii Wall. ex Hook. 1829 [1830]

= Erythrostemon gilliesii =

Species of legume

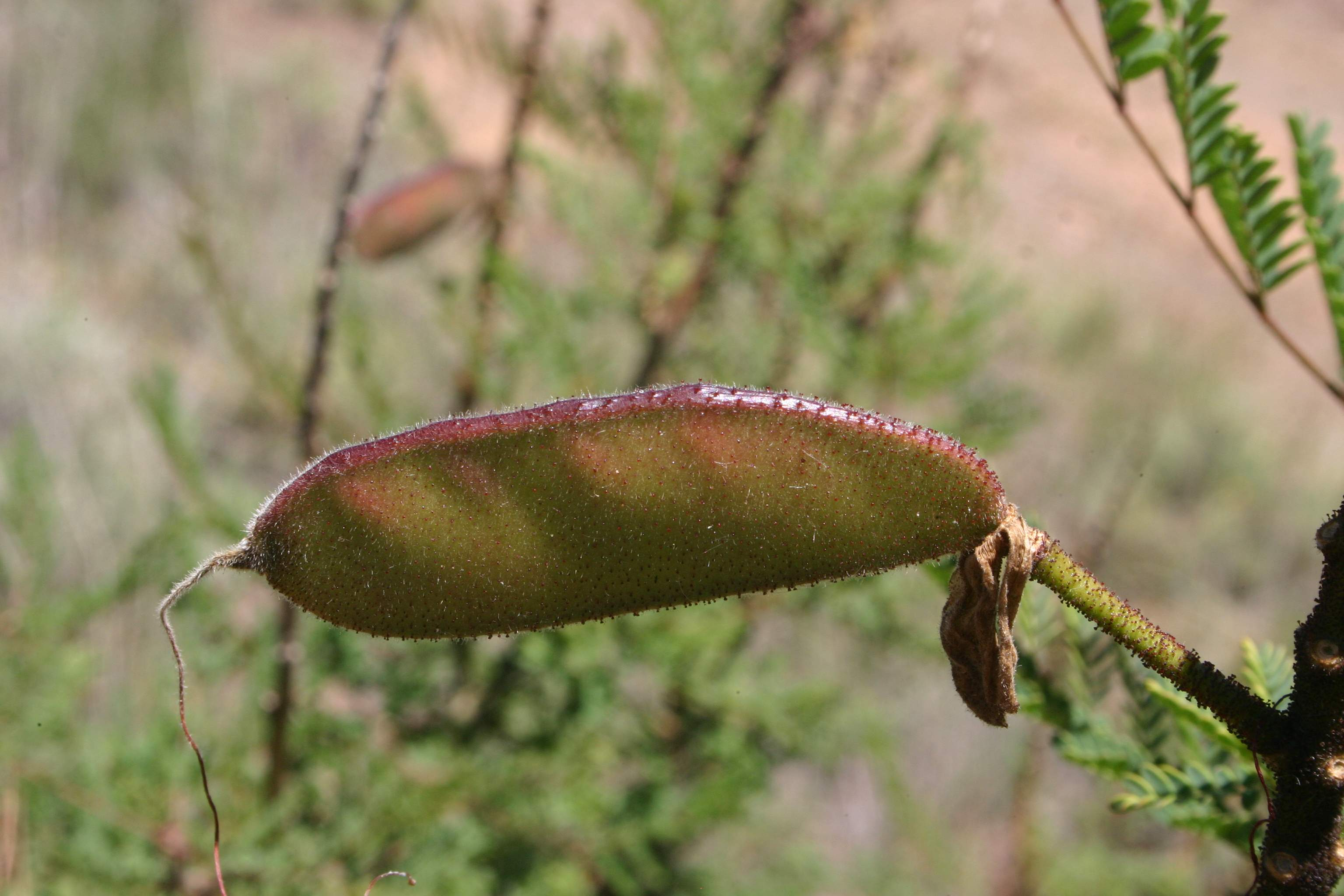

Erythrostemon gilliesii is a shrub in the legume family. It is commonly known as bird of paradise, but it is not related to the bird of paradise genus Strelitzia.

== Description ==
Erythrostemon gilliesii is a large evergreen shrub with 2-pinnate leaves. It is upright, open, and rounded with yellow flowers and long crimson stamens.

This plant grows up to 5m (16.5 ft), depending on rainfall. The leaves are bipinnate, 10–15 cm (4–6 in) long, bearing 3–10 pairs of pinnae, each with 6–10 pairs of leaflets 5–6 mm (0.20–0.24 in) long and 2–4 mm (0.079–0.157 in) broad. The flowers are borne in racemes up to 20 cm (8 in) long, each flower with five yellow petals with 10 long conspicuous red stamens. The pods are densely covered in short, red glandular hairs.

== Cultivation ==
It is a striking ornamental plant native to South America, mainly Argentina and Uruguay. It is naturalized in Texas, and fairly common in the rest of the southwestern United States, where it is known as bird of paradise bush, desert bird of paradise, yellow bird of paradise, and barba de chivo.

Although it is a tropical plant adapted to dry climates, it also thrives in the climate of Avsa and neighboring islands in the south of Sea of Marmara in northwestern Turkey, where it is commonly known as Paşabıyığı (Pasabiyigi), Cennetkuşu ağacı (Cennetkusu agaci), which in Turkish means "bird of paradise tree," and Bodurakasya, which means "dwarf acacia". This species is also fairly common in the Karoo of South Africa, and found in the Catalonian and Valencian regions of Spain.

== Medicinal uses ==
Medicine men of peoples indigenous to the Amazon rainforest used this plant and the similar Caesalpinia pulcherrima, which they called ayoowiri, for curing fever, sores, and cough. Four grams from the root is also said to induce abortion in the first trimester of pregnancy. Research has indicated that the plant has anti-microbial effects.

It may also be used in the extraction of contaminants from soil.

== Poisoning ==
Poisoning may occur with the seeds of this plant. The seeds and the green seed pods of this plant are toxic, provoking severe vomiting and other abdominal symptoms.
