= John Gillies (botanist) =

1792–1834, Scottish botanist

John Gillies (c. 1792–1834) was a Scottish naval surgeon who later became an explorer and botanist, travelling extensively in South America. Educated at the University of Edinburgh, he served in the Royal Navy during the Napoleonic Wars. Afflicted by tuberculosis, Gillies left the UK aged 28 for South America in the hope that the climate would improve his fragile health. He spent eight years there, mostly in Argentina, surviving wars, civil unrest, and chronic ill health, sending numerous plants to Hooker at the Royal Botanic Gardens Kew before returning in 1828. He died aged 42 at Edinburgh on 24 November 1834, his remains interred at Calton.

== Eponymy ==
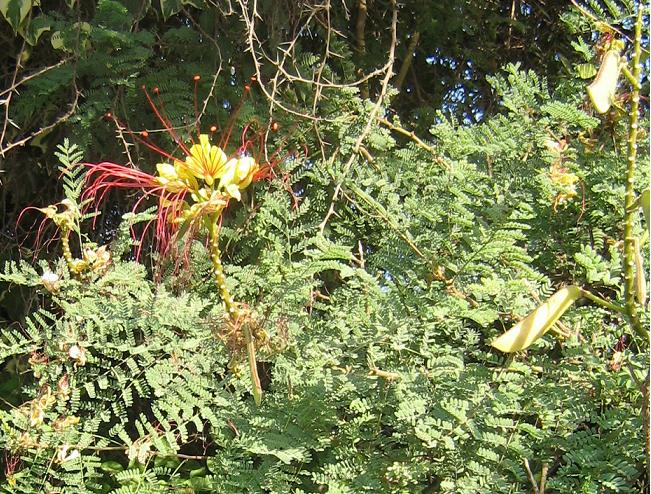
Caesalpinia gilliesii

A number of plants were named for Gillies:

- (Amaryllidaceae) Gilliesia Lindl.
- (Acanthaceae) Adhatoda gilliesii Nees
- (Acanthaceae) Poikilacanthus gilliesii (Nees) Lindau
- (Pteridaceae) Notholaena gilliesii Fée
- (Anacardiaceae) Lithraea gilliesii Griseb.
- (Asclepiadaceae) Oxystelma gilliesii K.Schum.
- (Asteraceae) Taraxacum gilliessi Hook. & Arn.
- (Blechnaceae) Orthogramma gilliesii C.Presl
- (Bromeliaceae) Dyckia gilliesii Baker
- (Caesalpiniaceae) Caesalpinia gilliesii (Wall. ex Hook.) Benth.
