= Pascanas =

- Town
- Interactive map of Pascanas
- Coordinates: 33.12498729°S 63.04269574°W
- Country: Argentina
- Province: Córdoba
- Department: Unión

Population (2022)
  - Total: 2,761

Pascanas is a town and municipality in Unión Department, Córdoba Province, Argentina.

== History ==
Pascanas was founded on 12 October 1903.

== Demographics ==
According to the 2022 Argentine census, Pascanas had a population of 2,761.
