= Siglo 21 University =

Private university in Córdoba, Argentina

Coordinates: 31.323°S 64.222°W

- Universidad Empresarial Siglo 21
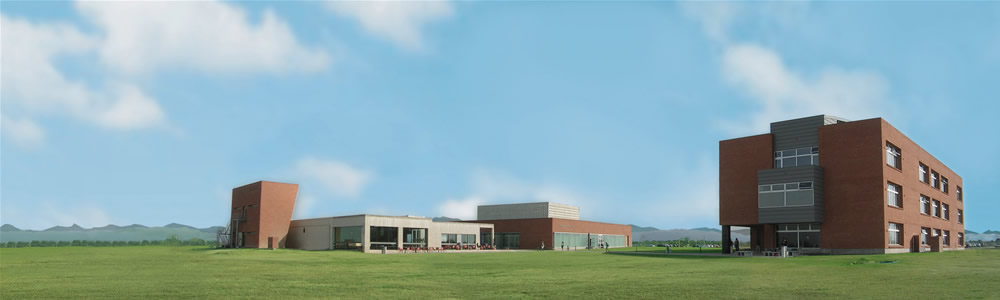
- University campus in Córdoba, Argentina
- Type: Private
- Established: 1995; 31 years ago
- President: Juan Carlos Rabbat
- Vice-president: María Belén Mendé Fernández
- Students: 90,000 (2025)
- Location: Córdoba, Argentina
- Campus: Urban
- Website: 21.edu.ar/
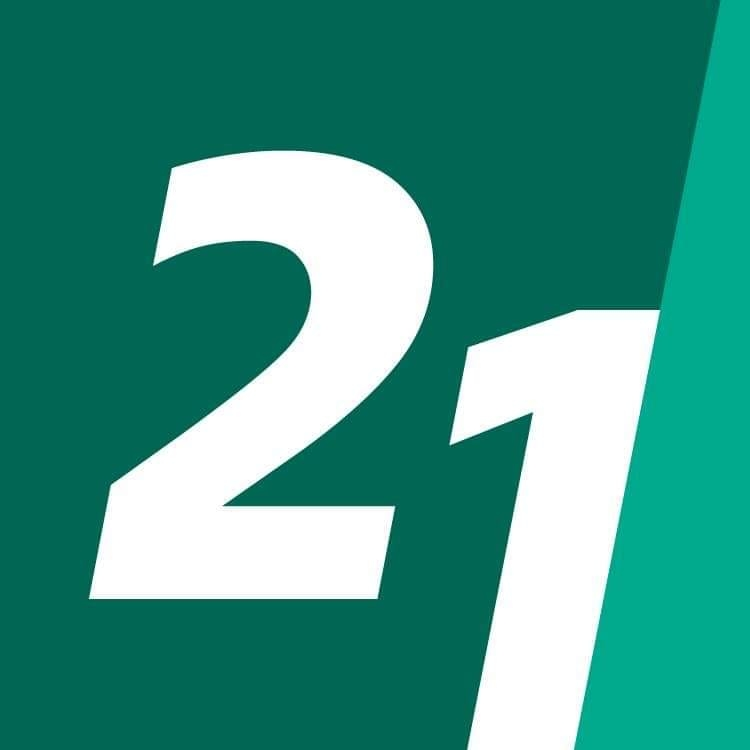

Siglo 21 University (Spanish: Universidad Empresarial Siglo 21) is a private university in Córdoba, Argentina. The university was founded in 1995 and has since become the largest private university in Argentina in terms of enrollment, with 90,000 students as of 2025. It operates through a distributed education system with over 350 centers for learning, known as Centros de Aprendizaje Universitario (CAU), across the country.

By 2023, Siglo 21 was reported to be the private university with the highest number of graduates in Argentina.

== History ==
Siglo 21 University was established in 1995 in Córdoba.

In 2004, it received definitive recognition from Argentina's National Commission for University Evaluation and Accreditation (CONEAU), the regulatory body responsible for evaluating and accrediting universities in Argentina. That same year, the university inaugurated its main campus in Córdoba, featuring a building designed by architect César Pelli.

In 2008, the university implemented a distributed education system, leading to the establishment of University Learning Centers across the country. This expansion model allowed the institution to extend its reach beyond Córdoba to other provinces in Argentina.

The university has conferred honorary doctorate degrees upon several prominent figures, including Nobel Prize-winning author Mario Vargas Llosa, former Brazilian President Fernando Henrique Cardoso, and former Chilean President Sebastián Piñera.

== Academic organization ==
=== Educational model ===
The university has a mainly distributed education system, combining online studies with physical meetings at local learning centers. Students log in to a multimedia system for their studies, then attend their local CAU for assistance or examinations.

=== Institutional affiliations ===
Siglo 21 University was a member of the Ilumno network, a higher education group headquartered in Miami that operates institutions across various countries in Latin America.

The university joined the Whitney International University System in 2010, enabling students and graduates to earn a Bachelor's degree from the New England College of Business and Finance (Massachusetts).

In 2017, Siglo 21 University became FC Barcelona's Latin American partner for FCB Universitas, the online platform of the educational program of FC Barcelona.
