= Jasminne Mendez =

American poet

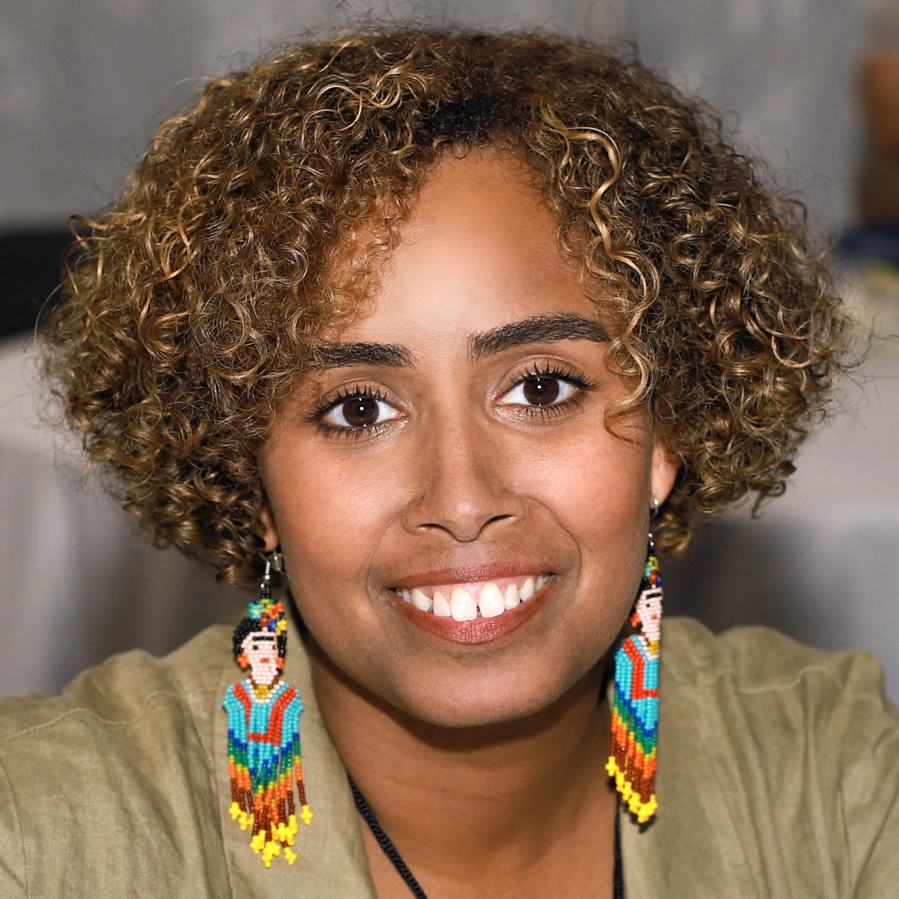
- Mendez at the 2022 Texas Book Festival.
- Education: University of Houston
- Occupations: Poet, short story writer, author
- Writing career
- Language: English, Spanish
- Notable works: Night Blooming Jasmin(n)e: Personal Essays and Poems (2019), Island of Dreams (2013)
- Notable awards: Best Young Adult Latino Focused Book
- Website: www.jasminnemendez.com/writing

Jasminne Mendez is an Afro-Latino American author, poet, playwright, performer and educator. She is a co-founder and the program director for Tintero Projects. She is co-host on the poetry and writing podcast series, InkWell, a collaboration between Tintero Projects and Inprint Houston. Mendez is a CantoMundo Fellow, a Kenyon Review Writer's Workshop Peter Taylor Fellow and a Macondo and Voices of our Nations Arts Foundation (VONA) alumni.

== Early life and education ==
Mendez's parents immigrated to the United States from the Dominican Republic in 1980. Having survived the dictatorship of Rafael Trujillo, her parents and grandparents were in search of a better life. Despite the fact that her father held a bachelor's degree, he had trouble finding a job in the United States and therefore decided to join the United States Army. He ultimately served in the Army for twenty-two years. As the daughter of immigrants, Mendez grew up speaking both Spanish and English.

Mendez completed high school in San Antonio, Texas before moving to Houston to attend the University of Houston from 2002 -2007 on a full scholarship as a Gates Millennium Scholar. She received a Bachelor's of Arts degrees in English Literature and a Master's of Education in Curriculum and Instruction. During her time at the University of Houston, Mendez wrote, performed poetry in local venues, and performed as the lead in various plays, including A Raisin in the Sun, For Colored Girls Who Have Considered Suicide When the Rainbow is Enuf, and Yerma. She received a Master's of Fine Arts in Creative Writing from the Rainier Writer's Workshop at Pacific Lutheran University.

== Career ==
Mendez's writing and performances focus on making visible the experience of Afro-Latinos in the United States. She has written a number of short stories, poetry, creative nonfiction, and books. In 2016, Cutthroat: A Journal of the Arts selected her creative non-fiction essay, "El Corte," as honorable mention for the Barry López Non-Fiction Award. In the same year, her collection of essays, "Interruptions & Detours" was a semi-finalist for the Rose Metal Press Essay Chapbook Prize. In 2017, Mendez received the COG Zine Best Poetry Prize.

Mendez's first book, Island of Dreams (Floricanto Press, 2013), is a mixture of poetry and memoir written from the perspective of her own teenage self and highlights the challenges of growing up Afro-Latina in the United States. The book is taught in schools across the United States and, in 2015, was awarded the Best Young Adult Latino Focused Book at the Latino Book Awards.

Her second book, Night-Blooming Jasmin(n)e: Personal Essays & Poems (Arte Público Press 2019) is a multi-genre memoir that explores her experience with chronic illness. At the age of 22, shortly after graduating from the University of Houston, Mendez was diagnosed with scleroderma. Six years after that, she was diagnosed with the autoimmune disease lupus. Night-Blooming Jasmin(n)e engages with the intersection of race, ethnicity, gender, and chronic illness.

In 2018, she served as the Senior Contributing Editor of Queen Mob's Tea House, a digital international literary journal.

In February 2019, her play, City Without Altar, was read at Stages Repertory Theatre's second annual Sin Muros Latinx Theatre Festival in Houston, Texas. This festival included other readings of plays by fellow playwrights Georgina Escobar and Beto O’Byrne.

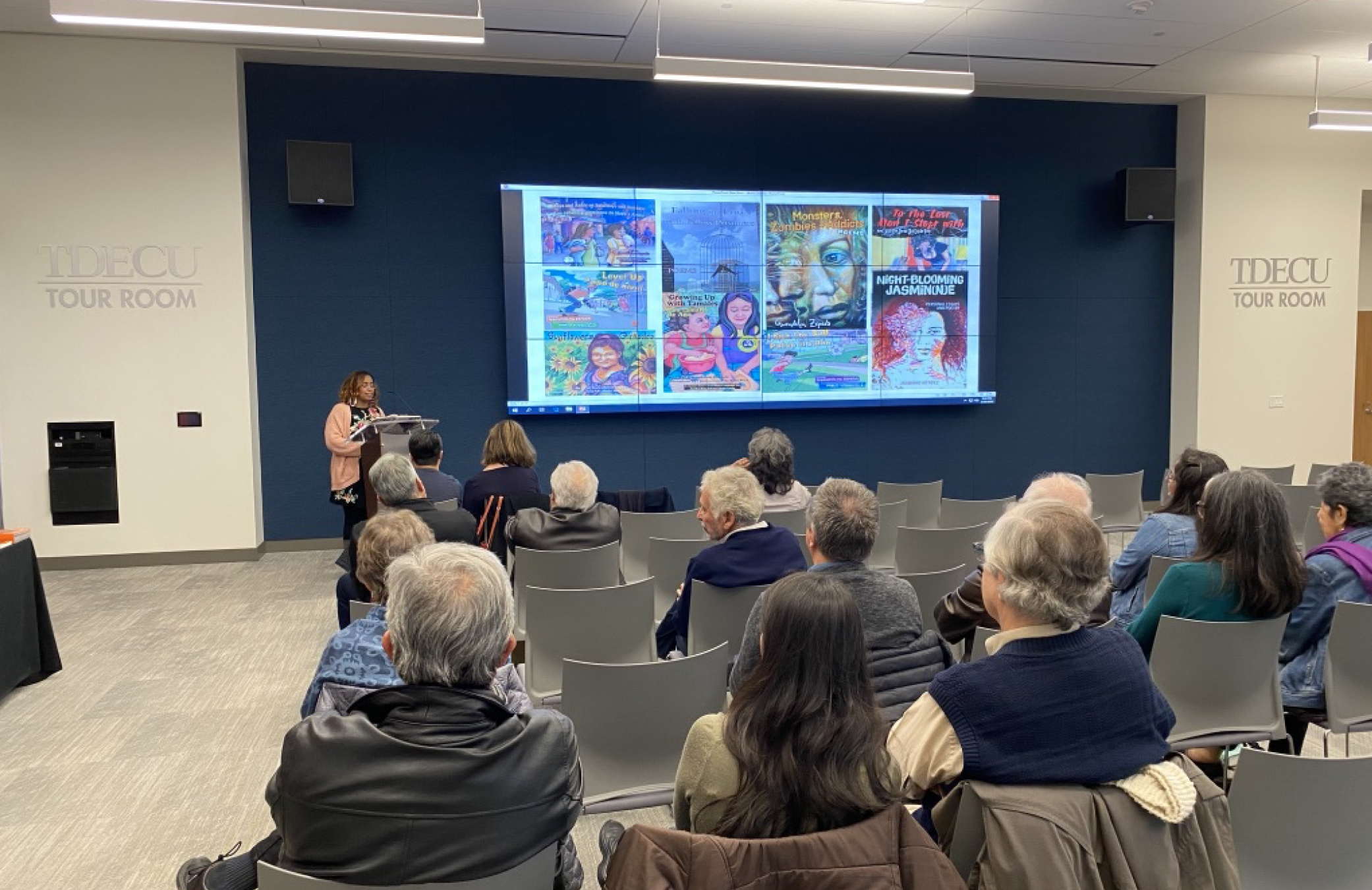
Jasminne Mendez reads her poetry at an "Arte Público Press Author Reading" that took place during the XV Recovering the US Hispanic Literary Heritage Conference on February 20, 2020, at the University of Houston Downtown.

Mendez has performed her poetry in a variety of venues, including for the Mexican American Studies department at University of Houston central campus as well as at the University of Houston Clearlake. She has also performed at other prestigious venues around Houston including Talento Bilingüe de Houston, Multicultural Education and Counseling Through the Arts, Houston Community College (HCC), the Holocaust Museum, the Alley Theatre, and the Museum of Fine Arts Houston (MFAH).

She has served as guest editor for Queen Mob's Teahouse's Afro-Latinx Poetry Special Issue and for The Acentos Review's "Natural" Disasters and The Environment special issue.

Mendez is active in the Houston artistic community. Together with her husband, poet-activist Lupe Mendez, she co-founded Tintero Projects in 2016. Tintero Projects, a part of Nuestra Palabra: Latino Writers Having Their Say, provides writing and reading opportunities for emerging Houston Latina/o poets and writers. In 2018, Mendez created the blog Plátano Poetry Café in order to help make visible the work and experiences of Afro-Latina/o poets.

== Awards ==
- Island of Dreams - Best Young Adult Latino Focused Book by the International Latino Book Awards (2015)
- COG Zine Best Poetry Prize (2017)
- City Without Altar - Helen C. Smith Memorial Award for Best Book of Poetry (2023)

== Bibliography ==
=== Books ===
- The Story of My Anger. Novel in verse. Dial Books, September 2025
- Anania Del Mar Jumps In. Novel in verse, winner of the Pura Belpré Author Honor Award. Dial Books, March 2023
- City Without Altar. Poetry and play in verse, winner of the Texas Institute of Letters Helen C. Smith Memorial Award. Noemi Press, August 2022
- Islands Apart: Becoming Dominican American. YA memoir. Arte Público Press, September 2022
- Josefina’s Habichuelas. Bilingual children's picture book. Arte Publico Press, October 2021
- Night-Blooming Jasmin(n)e: Personal Essays & Poems. Arte Publico Press, April 2019
- Island of Dreams. YA memoir, Best Young Adult Focused Book at International Latino Book Awards. Floricanto Press, November 2013

=== Essays and short stories ===
- "The China Cabinet" in Windows into My World: Latino Youth Write Their Lives. Arte Público Press, 2007
- "From Page to Stage: Teaching Slam Poetry in the High School Classroom." HowlRound, 2016.
- "Shades of Red." Dangerous Woman Project (University of Edinburgh), 2016
- "The Burden of Teachable Moments." The Rumpus, 2018
- "Lesson Plan: This is Not A Drill." Queen Mob's Teahouse, 2019
- "Motherhood, Maps & More." Queen Mob's Teahouse, 2019
- "First Words: English as a Second Language." La Galería Magazine
- “Alaiyo" in Wild Tongues Can’t Be Tamed: 15 Voices from the Latinx Diaspora. Flatiron Books, 2021

=== Poetry ===
- "Small Talk After A Reading in Texas: A Haitian Massacre." The Acentos Review, November 2016
- "Counting Beads." The Acentos Review, November 2016
- "Outsources: A Love Song." The Acentos Review, November 2016
- "First Born Son." Crab Creek Review, 2017
- "Run, Irelia, Run." COG Magazine, 2017
- Abecedarian for my Bilingual Students in Houston." Bird's Thumb, 2018
- "Machete: Look." The Quarry, Poetry Database- Split This Rock, 2019
- "Sugar Cane." Vassar Review, 2019
- "The Remedy or I Fixed It." Vassar Review, 2019
- "To El Hombre Dominicano..." Kenyon Review Online, 2019
- "Frijochuelas." La Galería Magazine, 2019
- "When Was the Last Time You Saw A Black Boy Smile." The Outrage Project: Rosebud Ben-Oni
- "Fathers & Sons." Label Me Latino/a: Special Issue on Afro Latino Writers
- "Morir Soñando." Label Me Latino/a: Special Issue on Afro Latino Writers
- "Again." Raising Mothers
- "Skin to Skin." Raising Mothers

== Personal life ==
She currently resides in the Houston area with her husband, the poet and educator Lupe Mendez, and their child.
