= 2023–24 Udinese Calcio season =

Udinese Calcio
2023–24 season
- President: Franco Soldati
- Manager: Andrea Sottil (until 24 October); Gabriele Cioffi (25 October–22 April); Fabio Cannavaro (from 22 April)
- Stadium: Stadio Friuli
- Serie A: 15th
- Coppa Italia: Round of 32
- Top goalscorer: League: Lorenzo Lucca (8); All: Lorenzo Lucca (9)
Home colours	Away colours	Third colours

The 2023–24 season was Udinese Calcio's 128th season in existence and 29th consecutive season in the Serie A. They also competed in the Coppa Italia.

On 22 April, with only six rounds remaining, Udinese's second coach Gabriele Cioffi was dismissed due to the team being at risk of relegation. On the same day, former Italian national captain Fabio Cannavaro was appointed.

== Players ==
=== First-team squad ===
As of 29 August 2023

Note: Flags indicate national team as defined under FIFA eligibility rules; some limited exceptions apply. Players may hold more than one non-FIFA nationality.

No.	Pos.	Nation	Player
1	GK	ITA	Marco Silvestri
2	DF	IRL	Festy Ebosele
3	DF	MAR	Adam Masina
4	MF	SLO	Sandi Lovrić
5	DF	FRA	Axel Guessand
6	MF	ESP	Oier Zarraga
7	FW	NGR	Isaac Success
8	MF	POR	Domingos Quina
10	FW	ESP	Gerard Deulofeu
11	MF	BRA	Walace
12	DF	CIV	Hassane Kamara
13	DF	POR	João Ferreira (on loan from Watford)
14	DF	IRL	James Abankwah
15	FW	FRA	Marley Aké (on loan from Juventus)
16	DF	CRO	Antonio Tikvić
17	FW	ITA	Lorenzo Lucca (on loan from Pisa)
18	DF	ARG	Nehuén Pérez
19	DF	NGR	Kingsley Ehizibue

No.	Pos.	Nation	Player
20	FW	POR	Vivaldo Semedo
21	MF	FRA	Etienne Camara
22	FW	BRA	Brenner
23	DF	CMR	Enzo Ebosse
24	MF	SRB	Lazar Samardžić
25	MF	ITA	Marco Ballarini
26	MF	FRA	Florian Thauvin
27	DF	BEL	Christian Kabasele
29	DF	SLO	Jaka Bijol
33	DF	ZIM	Jordan Zemura
34	FW	BEL	Sekou Diawara
40	GK	NGR	Maduka Okoye
77	FW	GHA	Raymond Asante
79	MF	SLO	David Pejičić
80	FW	ITA	Simone Pafundi
93	GK	ITA	Daniele Padelli
99	GK	ITA	Edoardo Piana

=== Out on loan ===
As of 18 July 2023

Note: Flags indicate national team as defined under FIFA eligibility rules; some limited exceptions apply. Players may hold more than one non-FIFA nationality.

No.	Pos.	Nation	Player
—	DF	CRO	Filip Benković (at Trabzonspor until 30 June 2023)
—	DF	POR	Leonardo Buta (at Gil Vicente until 30 June 2023)

No.	Pos.	Nation	Player
—	FW	BRA	Matheus Martins (at Watford until 30 June 2023)

== Transfers ==
=== In ===
Pos.	Player	Transferred from	Fee	Date	Source
MF	(Spain) Oier Zarraga	(Spain) Athletic Bilbao	Free	1 July 2023	
MF	(France) Etienne Camara	(England) Huddersfield Town	Undisclosed	14 July 2023	
DF	(Portugal) João Ferreira	(England) Watford	Loan	1 August 2023	
GK	(Nigeria) Maduka Okoye	(England) Watford	Undisclosed	24 August 2023	
MF	(Argentina) Martín Payero	(England) Middlesbrough	Undisclosed	1 September 2023	
FW	(England) Keinan Davis	(England) Aston Villa	Undisclosed	1 September 2023	
DF	(Argentina) Lautaro Giannetti	(Argentina) Vélez Sarsfield	Free	5 January 2024	
GK	(Italy) Edoardo Piana	(Italy) Alessandria	Loan return	10 January 2024	
DF	(Republic of Ireland) James Abankwah	(England) Charlton Athletic	Loan return	29 January 2024	

=== Out ===
Pos.	Player	Transferred to	Fee	Date	Source
DF	(Croatia) Filip Benković	(Turkey) Trabzonspor	Loan	10 July 2023	
DF	(Portugal) Leonardo Buta	(Portugal) Gil Vicente	Loan	18 July 2023	
DF	(Brazil) Rodrigo Becão	(Turkey) Fenerbahçe	€8,312,500	19 July 2023	
FW	(Guinea-Bissau) Beto	(England) Everton	€31,000,000	29 August 2023	
FW	(North Macedonia) Ilija Nestorovski	(Italy) Ascoli	Free	29 August 2023	
DF	(Republic of Ireland) James Abankwah	(England) Charlton Athletic	Loan	1 September 2023	
GK	(Italy) Edoardo Piana	(Italy) Messina	Loan	11 January 2024	
FW	(France) Marley Aké	(Italy) Juventus	Loan return	17 January 2024	
FW	(Portugal) Vivaldo	(Netherlands) Volendam	Loan	24 January 2024	
FW	(Belgium) Sekou Diawara	(Belgium) Beerschot	Loan	25 January 2024	
MF	(Portugal) Domingos Quina	(Portugal) Vizela	Loan	29 January 2024	
DF	(Morocco) Adam Masina	(Italy) Torino	Loan	1 February 2024	
MF	(France) Etienne Camara	(Belgium) Charleroi	Undisclosed	1 February 2024	

Notes
1.Plus a €500,000 fee.

== Pre-season and friendlies ==
Win Draw Loss

16 July 2023 Friendly	Udinese (Italy)	15–0	(Italy) Rappresentativa Carnica	Friuli
18:00	Thauvin 12', 82'; Beto 17' (pen.), 22', 43', 45+3'; Zarraga 36', 40'; Semedo 53', 64', 74'; Pejičić 62'; Lucca 68', 80' (pen.); Quina 71'	Report		Referee: Marangone

19 July 2023 Friendly	ASK Klagenfurt (Austria)	1–5	(Italy) Udinese	Klagenfurt am Wörthersee, Austria
18:00 UTC+2	Černoš 43'		Beto 28' (pen.); Thauvin 36'; Samardžić 77', 86'; Lovrić 90+1'	Stadium: ASK-Sportanlage Fischl

22 July 2023 Friendly	Udinese (Italy)	2–0	(Cyprus) Pafos	Seeboden, Austria
15:30 UTC+2	Beto 27'; Thauvin 43'	Report		Stadium: Sportarena Seeboden; Referee: Wieser

25 July 2023 Friendly	RB Leipzig (Germany)	1–2	(Italy) Udinese	Lienz, Austria
18:00 UTC+2	Köhler (yellow card) 23'; Openda 66'	Report	Samardžić 30'; Semedo 83'	Stadium: Dolomitenstadion; Attendance: 2,550; Referee: Marco Schlacher (Austria)

29 July 2023 Friendly	Udinese (Italy)	0–1	(Germany) Union Berlin	Lienz, Austria
15:30 CEST (UTC+2)		Report	Roussillon 73'	Stadium: Dolomitenstadion; Attendance: 1,500

4 August 2023 Friendly	Udinese (Italy)	2–1	(Qatar) Al-Rayyan	Udine
20:30 UTC+2	Beto 35'; Thauvin 50'	Report	Al-Rawi 23'	Stadium: Bluenergy Stadium

5 August 2023 Friendly	Udinese (Italy)	2–1	(Qatar) Al-Rayyan	Udine
11:00 UTC+2	Lucca 70'; Semedo 72'	Report	Binsabaa 38' (pen.)	Stadium: Centro Sportivo Dino Bruseschi

14 October 2023 Friendly	Rijeka (Croatia)	1–1	(Italy) Udinese	Rijeka, Croatia
17:00 UTC+2	Pašalić 36'	Report	Zarraga 26'; Pérez (yellow card) ?' (yellow-red card) 89'	Stadium: Stadion Rujevica; Referee: Rozman

18 November 2023 Friendly	Udinese (Italy)	1–1	(Croatia) Istra 1961	Lignano Sabbiadoro
15:00 UTC+1	Aké 45'		Filet 11'	Stadium: Stadio Guido Teghil

25 March 2024 Friendly	Udinese (Italy)	2–3	(Italy) Padova
15:00 UTC+1

== Competitions ==
=== Overall record ===
Competition	First match	Last match	Starting round	Final position	Record							
Competition	First match	Last match	Starting round	Final position	Pld	W	D	L	GF	GA	GD	Win %
Serie A	20 August 2023	26 May 2024	Matchday 1	15th	38	6	19	13	37	53	−16	15.79
Coppa Italia	11 August 2023	1 November 2023	Round of 64	Round of 32	2	1	0	1	5	3	+2	50.00
Total					40	7	19	14	42	56	−14	17.50

Source: Soccerway

=== Serie A ===
==== League table ====
Pos	Team	Pld	W	D	L	GF	GA	GD	Pts
13	Hellas Verona	38	9	11	18	38	51	−13	38 (Note: Hellas Verona finished ahead of Lecce on head-to-head points: Hellas Verona 2–2 Lecce, Lecce 0–1 Hellas Verona.)
14	Lecce	38	8	14	16	32	54	−22	38
15	Udinese	38	6	19	13	37	53	−16	37
16	Cagliari	38	8	12	18	42	68	−26	36 (Note: Cagliari finished ahead of Empoli on head-to-head points: Cagliari 0–0 Empoli, Empoli 0–1 Cagliari.)
17	Empoli	38	9	9	20	29	54	−25	36

Source: Serie A
Rules for classification: 1) Points; 2) Tiebreaker for Champions team and third relegated team; 3) Head-to-head points; 4) Head-to-head goal difference; 5) Goal difference; 6) Goals scored; 7) Draw.
(Note: Head-to-head record is used only after all the matches between the teams in question have been played)

==== Results summary ====
Overall								Home						Away					
Pld	W	D	L	GF	GA	GD	Pts	W	D	L	GF	GA	GD	W	D	L	GF	GA	GD
38	6	19	13	37	53	−16	37	1	11	7	21	29	−8	5	8	6	16	24	−8

Source: Serie A

==== Results by round ====
Round	1	2	3	4	5	6	7	8	9	10	11	12	13	14	15	16	17	18	19	20	21	22	23	24	25	26	27	28	29	30	31	32	33	34	35	36	37	38
Ground	H	A	H	A	H	A	H	A	H	A	A	H	A	H	A	H	A	H	H	A	H	A	H	A	H	A	H	A	H	A	H	H	A	A	H	A	H	A
Result	L	D	D	D	L	L	D	D	D	D	W	D	L	D	L	D	D	W	L	D	L	L	D	W	D	L	D	W	L	D	L	L	L	D	D	W	D	W
Position	20	16	17	16	18	18	17	17	18	17	16	16	16	16	16	17	17	15	16	17	16	17	16	15	14	15	15	13	14	14	15	15	17	18	18	15	17	15

Source: Serie A
A = Away; H = Home; W = Win; D = Draw; L = Loss

==== Matches ====
The league fixtures were unveiled on 5 July 2023.

20 August 2023 1	Udinese	0–3	Juventus	Udine
20:45 CEST (UTC+2)	Kabasele (yellow card) 31'	Report	Chiesa 2'; Vlahović 20' (pen.); Alex Sandro (yellow card) 28'; Danilo (yellow card) 35'; Rabiot 45+3'; Locatelli (yellow card) 90+5'	Stadium: Stadio Friuli; Attendance: 24,991; Referee: Antonio Rapuano

28 August 2023 2	Salernitana	1–1	Udinese	Salerno
18:30 CEST (UTC+2)	Botheim (yellow card) 60'; Bradarić (yellow card) 64'; Pirola (yellow card) 64'; Dia 72'; Candreva (yellow card) 90+4'	Report	Lovrić (yellow card) 49'; Kabasele (yellow card) 55'; Samardžić 57'; Ferreira (yellow card) 70'; Walace (yellow card) 90+4'	Stadium: Stadio Arechi; Attendance: 20,000; Referee: Davide Massa

2 September 2023 3	Udinese	0–0	Frosinone	Udine
18:30 CEST (UTC+2)	Thauvin (yellow card) 64'; Kabasele (yellow card) 83'	Report	Soulé (yellow card) 31'; Báez (yellow card) 75'	Stadium: Stadio Friuli; Attendance: 20,116; Referee: Marco Guida

17 September 2023 4	Cagliari	0–0	Udinese	Cagliari
12:30 CEST (UTC+2)	Wieteska (yellow card) 60' (yellow-red card) 90+5'	Report	Thauvin (yellow card) 63'	Stadium: Unipol Domus; Attendance: 15,121; Referee: Daniele Doveri

24 September 2023 5	Udinese	0–2	Fiorentina	Udine
15:00 CEST (UTC+2)		Report	Martínez Quarta 32'; Ranieri (yellow card) 39'; Bonaventura 90+3'	Stadium: Stadio Friuli; Attendance: 21,229; Referee: Daniele Chiffi

27 September 2023 6	Napoli	4–1	Udinese	Naples
20:45 CEST (UTC+2)	Zieliński 19' (pen.); Osimhen 39'; Kvaratskhelia 74'; Simeone (yellow card) 74', (goal) 81'	Report	Pérez (yellow card) 62'; Samardžić 81'	Stadium: Stadio Diego Armando Maradona; Attendance: 45,305; Referee: Gianluca Manganiello

1 October 2023 7	Udinese	2–2	Genoa	Udine
15:00 CEST (UTC+2)	Lucca 23'; Pereyra (yellow card) 35'; Success (yellow card) 43'; Matturro 90+1' (o.g.); Lovrić (red card) 90+4'	Report	Guðmundsson 14', 41'; Martínez (yellow card) 25'; Frendrup (yellow card) 90+6'	Stadium: Stadio Friuli; Attendance: 20,805; Referee: Maurizio Mariani

6 October 2023 8	Empoli	0–0	Udinese	Empoli
18:30 CEST (UTC+2)	Maleh (yellow card) 56'	Report	Pereyra (yellow card) 66'; Pérez (yellow card) 84'	Stadium: Stadio Carlo Castellani; Attendance: 7,128; Referee: Michael Fabbri

23 October 2023 9	Udinese	1–1	Lecce	Udine
18:30 CEST (UTC+2)	Kabasele (yellow card) 5'; Thauvin 49' (pen.), (yellow card) 77'; Ebosele (yellow card) 90+1'	Report	Ramadani (yellow card) 34'; Pongračić (yellow card) 72'; Baschirotto (yellow card) 73'; Dorgu (yellow card) 75'; Piccoli 83'; Gendrey (yellow card) 84'	Stadium: Stadio Friuli; Attendance: 20,113; Referee: Paride Tremolada

29 October 2023 10	Monza	1–1	Udinese	Monza
15:00 CET (UTC+1)	Colpani 27'; Marí (yellow card) 34'; Pessina (yellow card) 90+4'	Report	Padelli (yellow card) 45+2'; Lucca 66'; Ferreira (yellow card) 87'	Stadium: Stadio Brianteo; Attendance: 10,311; Referee: Alessandro Prontera

4 November 2023 11	Milan	0–1	Udinese	Milan
20:45 CET (UTC+1)	Krunić (yellow card) 19'	Report	Pérez (yellow card) 54'; Kabasele (yellow card) 55'; Pereyra 62' (pen.)	Stadium: San Siro; Attendance: 71,018; Referee: Juan Luca Sacchi

12 November 2023 12	Udinese	1–1	Atalanta	Udine
15:00 CET (UTC+1)	Success (penalty missed) 31'; Ferreira (yellow card) 42'; Walace 44'; Bijol (yellow card) 77'	Report	Koopmeiners (yellow card) 59'; De Roon (yellow card) 89'; Éderson 90+2'	Stadium: Stadio Friuli; Attendance: 23,100; Referee: Gianluca Aureliano

26 November 2023 13	Roma	3–1	Udinese	Rome
18:00 CET (UTC+1)	Mancini 20'; Pellegrini (yellow card) 33'; Dybala 81'; El Shaarawy 90'	Report	Ferreira (yellow card) 19'; Samardžić (yellow card) 26'; Success (yellow card) 28'; Thauvin 57'	Stadium: Stadio Olimpico; Attendance: 61,616; Referee: Luca Massimi

3 December 2023 14	Udinese	3–3	Hellas Verona	Udine
15:00 CET (UTC+1)	Kabasele 16'; Lucca 30', 72'; Zemura (yellow card) 44'; Payero (yellow card) 45+1'	Report	Đurić (yellow card) 6', (goal) 37' (pen.); Amione (yellow card) 45+4'; Coppola (yellow card) 50'; Ngonge 61', (yellow card) 82'; Henry (yellow card) 89', (goal) 90+7'	Stadium: Stadio Friuli; Attendance: 22,294; Referee: Fabio Maresca

9 December 2023 15	Internazionale	4–0	Udinese	Milan
20:45 CET (UTC+1)	Çalhanoğlu 37' (pen.); Dimarco 42'; Thuram 44'; Martínez 84'	Report	Ferreira (yellow card) 13'	Stadium: San Siro; Attendance: 71,874; Referee: Marco Di Bello

17 December 2023 16	Udinese	2–2	Sassuolo	Udine
15:00 CET (UTC+1)	Lucca 36'; Pereyra 55', (yellow card) 90+3'; Payero (red card) 59'; Ebosele (yellow card) 77'; Masina (yellow card) 90'	Report	Pedersen (yellow card) 20'; Berardi 75' (pen.), 88' (pen.)	Stadium: Stadio Friuli; Attendance: 20,490; Referee: Gianluca Manganiello

23 December 2023 17	Torino	1–1	Udinese	Turin
15:00 CET (UTC+1)	Sanabria (yellow card) 53'; Ilić 88'; Vojvoda (yellow card) 90+2'	Report	Kamara (yellow card) 48'; Lucca (yellow card) 76'; Zarraga 81'	Stadium: Stadio Olimpico Grande Torino; Attendance: 23,546; Referee: Michael Fabbri

30 December 2023 18	Udinese	3–0	Bologna	Udine
15:00 CET (UTC+1)	Pereyra 23', (yellow card) 45+2'; Lucca 48'; Payero 52'; Success (yellow card) 90+2'	Report	Urbański (yellow card) 6'; Ferguson (yellow card) 45+3'; Freuler (yellow card) 63'; Zirkzee (yellow card) 72'; Fabbian (yellow card) 75'	Stadium: Stadio Friuli; Attendance: 25,144; Referee: Daniele Orsato

7 January 2024 19	Udinese	1–2	Lazio	Udine
15:00 CET (UTC+1)	Kristensen (yellow card) 10'; Payero (yellow card) 35'; Masina (yellow card) 38'; Ferreira (yellow card) 44'; Walace 59'; Pérez (yellow card) 90+1'	Report	Pellegrini 12', (yellow card) 58'; Kamada (yellow card) 40'; Gila (yellow card) 46'; Vecino 76'	Stadium: Stadio Friuli; Attendance: 23,033; Referee: Juan Luca Sacchi

14 January 2024 20	Fiorentina	2–2	Udinese	Florence
18:00 CET (UTC+1)	Beltrán 55'; Ranieri (yellow card) 62'; Nzola 87' (pen.)	Report	Lovrić 10'; Kamara (yellow card) 35'; Thauvin 73'	Stadium: Stadio Artemio Franchi; Attendance: 23,686; Referee: Luca Pairetto

20 January 2024 21	Udinese	2–3	Milan	Udine
20:45 CET (UTC+1)	Samardžić 42'; Kamara (yellow card) 45+1'; Ebosele (yellow card) 52'; Thauvin (yellow card) 56', (goal) 62'; Walace (yellow card) 65'; Lucca (yellow card) 71'; Ferreira (yellow card) 78'	Report	Loftus-Cheek 31'; Jović 83'; Hernandez (yellow card) 88'; Okafor 90+3'	Stadium: Stadio Friuli; Attendance: 15,077; Referee: Fabio Maresca
Note: The match was delayed for five minutes in the first half after Milan players left the pitch, due to racist crowd remarks towards Milan goalkeeper Mike Maignan.

27 January 2024 22	Atalanta	2–0	Udinese	Bergamo
15:00 CET (UTC+1)	Miranchuk 33'; Scamacca 45+1'; Pašalić (yellow card) 75'; Éderson (yellow card) 77'	Report	Kristensen (yellow card) 28'	Stadium: Gewiss Stadium; Attendance: 14,716; Referee: Marco Piccinini

3 February 2024 23	Udinese	0–0	Monza	Udine
15:00 CET (UTC+1)	Pereyra (yellow card) 27'; Walace (yellow card) 60'; Ehizibue (yellow card) 65'	Report	Pereira (yellow card) 84'; Izzo (yellow card) 90+3'	Stadium: Stadio Friuli; Attendance: 11,373; Referee: Alessandro Prontera

12 February 2024 24	Juventus	0–1	Udinese	Turin
20:45 CET (UTC+1)	Bremer (yellow card) 38'; Gatti (yellow card) 74'; Nicolussi (yellow card) 90+2'	Report	Ehizibue (yellow card) 10'; Gianetti 25'; Walace (yellow card) 82'; Success (yellow card) 89'	Stadium: Juventus Stadium; Attendance: 38,856; Referee: Rosario Abisso

18 February 2024 25	Udinese	1–1	Cagliari	Udine
15:00 CET (UTC+1)	Zemura 14'; Lucca (yellow card) 20'; Gianetti (yellow card) 54'; Ferreira (yellow card) 78'	Report	Dossena (yellow card) 33'; Augello (yellow card) 39'; Gaetano 44'	Stadium: Stadio Friuli; Attendance: 15,445; Referee: Maurizio Mariani

24 February 2024 26	Genoa	2–0	Udinese	Genoa
20:45 CET (UTC+1)	De Winter (yellow card) 30'; Retegui 36'; Bani 40'	Report	Gianetti (yellow card) 2'; Kristensen (yellow card) 42' (yellow-red card) 49'; Ebosele (yellow card) 86'	Stadium: Stadio Luigi Ferraris; Attendance: 31,126; Referee: Francesco Fourneau

2 March 2024 27	Udinese	1–1	Salernitana	Udine
15:00 CET (UTC+1)	Ebosele (yellow card) 16' (yellow-red card) 64'; Payero (yellow card) 36'; Kamara 45+3'; Giannetti (yellow card) 47'; Walace (yellow card) 75'	Report	Tchaouna 10'; Pellegrino (yellow card) 50'	Stadium: Stadio Friuli; Attendance: 20,369; Referee: Gianluca Manganiello

11 March 2024 28	Lazio	1–2	Udinese	Rome
20:45 CET (UTC+1)	Felipe Anderson (yellow card) 45+1'; Gianetti 49' (o.g.); Romagnoli (yellow card) 57'; Vecino (yellow card) 90+9'	Report	Pérez (yellow card) 44' (yellow-red card) 90+4'; Lucca 47', (yellow card) 86'; Zarraga 51'; Okoye (yellow card) 64'; Bijol (yellow card) 83'; Samardžić (yellow card) 88'	Stadium: Stadio Olimpico; Attendance: 34,000; Referee: Gianluca Aureliano

16 March 2024 29	Udinese	0–2	Torino	Udine
15:00 CET (UTC+1)	Walace (yellow card) 43'; Ehizibue (yellow card) 45'; Gianetti (yellow card) 57'	Report	Zapata 10'; Buongiorno (yellow card) 52'; Vlašić 53'; Sazonov (yellow card) 87'	Stadium: Stadio Friuli; Attendance: 21,223; Referee: Andrea Colombo

1 April 2024 30	Sassuolo	1–1	Udinese	Reggio Emilia
15:00 CEST (UTC+2)	Doig (yellow card) 40'; Defrel 41'	Report	Lucca (yellow card) 16'; Bijol (yellow card) 25'; Thauvin 44'	Stadium: Mapei Stadium – Città del Tricolore; Attendance: 11,512; Referee: Michael Fabbri

8 April 2024 31	Udinese	1–2	Internazionale	Udine
20:45 CEST (UTC+2)	Samardžić 40'; Pereyra (yellow card) 78'	Report	Çalhanoğlu 55' (pen.); Pavard (yellow card) 90+2'; Martínez (yellow card) 90+3'; Frattesi 90+5'	Stadium: Stadio Friuli; Attendance: 24,993; Referee: Marco Piccinini

20 April 2024 33	Hellas Verona	1–0	Udinese	Verona
20:45 CEST (UTC+2)	Serdar (yellow card) 13'; Cabral (yellow card) 14'; Coppola 90+3'	Report	Walace (yellow card) 16'; Samardžić (yellow card) 29'	Stadium: Stadio Marcantonio Bentegodi; Attendance: 27,662; Referee: Marco Guida

25 April 2024 32	Udinese	1–2	Roma	Udine
20:00 CEST (UTC+2)	Pereyra 23'; Kamara (yellow card) 31'; Bijol (yellow card) 58'; Payero (yellow card) 66'	Report	Lukaku 64'; Baldanzi (yellow card) 69'; Karsdorp (yellow card) 90+3'; Cristante 90+5'	Stadium: Stadio Friuli; Attendance: 24,947; Referee: Luca Pairetto
Note: The match was originally played on 14 April 2024 at 18:00, but was suspended in the 71st minute with the score at 1–1, after Roma player Evan Ndicka collapsed on the pitch. The remainder of the match was postponed to be completed on 25 April 2024.

28 April 2024 34	Bologna	1–1	Udinese	Bologna
15:00 CEST (UTC+2)	Beukema (yellow card) 55' (yellow-red card) 64'; Zirkzee (yellow card) 75'; Saelemaekers 78'	Report	Ehizibue (yellow card) 42'; Payero 45+1', (yellow card) 82'; Okoye (yellow card) 50'; Lucca (yellow card) 53'; Pérez (yellow card) 68'; Davis (yellow card) 89'; Ferreira (yellow card) 90+2'	Stadium: Stadio Renato Dall'Ara; Attendance: 27,396; Referee: Juan Luca Sacchi

6 May 2024 35	Udinese	1–1	Napoli	Udine
20:45 CEST (UTC+2)	Success 90+2'	Report	Osimhen 51'	Stadium: Stadio Friuli; Attendance: 20,872; Referee: Gianluca Aureliano

13 May 2024 36	Lecce	0–2	Udinese	Lecce
18:30 CEST (UTC+2)	Blin (yellow card) 17'; Dorgu (yellow card) 57'	Report	Lucca 36'; Payero (yellow card) 60'; Samardžić 85'	Stadium: Stadio Via del mare Attendance: 28,041; Referee: Davide Massa

19 May 2024 37	Udinese	1–1	Empoli	Udine
15:00 CEST (UTC+2)	Pérez (yellow card) 35'; Samardžić 90+14' (pen.)	Report	Grassi (yellow card) 4' (yellow-red card) 90+15'; Bastoni (yellow card) 54'; Ismajli (yellow card) 64'; Gyasi (yellow card) 75'; Niang 90' (pen.); Marin (yellow card) 90+6'; Fazzini (yellow card) 90+12'	Stadium: Stadio Friuli; Attendance: 24,686; Referee: Marco Guida
Note: Grassi received a second yellow card having already been substituted out of the match.

26 May 2024 38	Frosinone	0–1	Udinese	Frosinone
20:45 CEST (UTC+2)		Report	Pérez (yellow card) 66'; Davis 76', (yellow card) 77'	Stadium: Stadio Benito Stirpe; Attendance: 16,190; Referee: Daniele Doveri

=== Coppa Italia ===
11 August 2023 Round of 64	Udinese	4–1	Catanzaro	Udine
18:00 CEST (UTC+2)	Lovrić 9'; Beto 49'; Masina (yellow card) 51'; Thauvin 64' (pen.); Lucca 90+3'	Report	Vandeputte 12'	Stadium: Stadio Friuli; Attendance: 4,801; Referee: Daniele Minelli

1 November 2023 Round of 32	Udinese	1–2 (a.e.t.)	Cagliari	Udine
21:00 CET (UTC+1)	Guessand 63', (yellow card) 79'; Quina (yellow card) 90+5'; Ferreira (yellow card) 108'	Report	Pereiro (yellow card) 76'; Viola 80'; Wieteska (yellow card) 90+2'; Lapadula 120'	Stadium: Stadio Friuli; Attendance: 4,537; Referee: Francesco Cosso
