= Beto =

Beto is a surname and a first name, and a nickname in Portuguese and Spanish languages for given names ending in "-berto": Adalberto, Adelberto, Adilberto, Agberto, Agilberto, Agliberto, Aiberto, Alberto, Albertino, Aldeberto, Aldoberto, Aliberto, Amalberto, Amberto, Analberto, Andeberto, Angilberto, Ansberto, Ariberto, Auberto, Audoberto, Auriberto, Ausberto, Austreberto, Austroberto, Autberto, Baldoberto, Berthony, Bertino, Berto, Calberto, Cariberto, Childeberto, Clauberto, Cloroberto, Colberto, Coloberto, Cuniberto, Cutberto, Dagoberto, Dalberto, Delberto, Dilberto, Diliberto, Eadberto, Ecberto, Edberto, Edelberto, Ediberto, Edilberto, Egberto, Eguiberto, Elberto, Eliberto, Elisberto, Emeberto, Engelberto, Erberto, Eriberto, Erisberto, Etelberto, Euberto, Felisberto, Filberto, Filiberto, Flauberto, Floriberto, Folberto, Framberto, Froberto, Frodoberto, Fulberto, Galberto, Gaudiberto, Gerberto, Geriberto, Gesilberto, Gilberto, Gisberto, Giselberto, Gisilberto, Glauberto, Godeberto, Godoberto, Gomberto, Gualberto, Gundeberto, Gundelberto, Gundiperto, Heberto, Herberto, Heriberto, Hilberto, Hildeberto, Huberto, Hugoberto, Humberto, Idalberto, Idelberto, Ingberto, Isberto, Isamberto, Josiberto, Kuniberto, Lamberto, Landeberto, Leoberto, Liberto, Lindoberto, Luzberto, Madalberto, Madelberto, Mamerto, Nilberto, Nolberto, Norberto, Oberto, Odeberto, Osberto, Ramberto, Raimberto, Ratberto, Regimberto, Reinberto, Remberto, Romberto, Rigoberto, Roberto, Rodiberto, Ruperto, Segisberto, Siberto, Sigeberto, Sigiberto, Sigiberto, Silberto, Teoberto, Teodoberto, Umberto, Walberto, Wamberto, Wigberto, Wilberto, Wiliberto, Valberto, Vigberto. The stem "-berto" is a Romance languages variant of German "-bert", which comes from the Old Germanic Berht (brightness or radiance).

Notable people with the name include:

== Given name or nickname ==
=== Arts and entertainment ===
- Beto Benites, Peruvian actor
- Beto Carrero (1937–2008), Brazilian theme park owner and entertainer
- Beto Cuevas (born 1967), Chilean singer and artist
- Robert de la Rocha, American artist
- Beto Guedes (born 1951), Brazilian musician, singer and songwriter
- Gilbert Hernandez (born 1957), American cartoonist best known for the Love and Rockets comics
- Beto O'Byrne, American playwright
- Beto (Portuguese singer) (1967–2010), Portuguese singer Albertino João Santos Pereira
- Beto Pérez, Colombian dancer
- Beto Quintanilla, Mexican singer and musician

=== Politics ===
- Beto Mansur (born 1951), Brazilian politician and soybean farmer
- Robert "Beto" O'Rourke (born 1972), American Democratic politician, candidate for president in 2020, and former US Representative
- Beto Richa (born 1965), governor of the Brazilian state of Paraná 2011–2018

=== Sports ===
==== Football ====
- Beto (footballer, born 1946), full name Roberto Hermont Arantes, Brazilian football midfielder
- Beto (footballer, born 1959), full name Roberto Gilmar Hinterholz, Brazilian football goalkeeper
- Beto (footballer, born 1973), full name Valberto Amorim dos Santos, Brazilian football defensive midfielder
- Beto (footballer, born 1975), full name Joubert Araújo Martins, Brazilian football midfielder
- Beto (footballer, born May 1976), full name Roberto Luís Gaspar de Deus Severo, Portuguese football defender
- Beto (footballer, born November 1976), full name Gilberto Galdino dos Santos, Brazilian football midfielder
- Beto (footballer, born 1979), full name Roberto Mendes da Silva, Brazilian football
- Beto (footballer, born 1980), full name Cícero Herbete de Oliveira Melo, Brazilian football striker
- Beto (footballer, born February 1981), full name Luiz Alberto de Sousa, Brazilian football left-back
- Beto (footballer, born October 1981), full name André Roberto Soares da Silva, Brazilian football striker
- Beto (footballer, born 1982), full name António Alberto Bastos Pimparel, Portuguese football goalkeeper
- Beto (footballer, born 1984), full name Roberto Fronza, Brazilian football centre-back
- Beto (footballer, born 1986), full name Webert da Silva Miguel, Brazilian football midfielder
- Beto (footballer, born 1987), full name Alberto Antônio de Paula, Brazilian football striker
- Beto (footballer, born 1998), full name Norberto Bercique Gomes Betuncal, Bissau-Guinean football striker
- Beto Acosta (born 1966), Argentine football striker
- Beto Carranza (born 1972), Argentine football midfielder
- Beto Naveda (born 1972), Argentine football striker
- Beto Acosta (born 1977), Uruguayan football striker
- Beto Gonçalves (born 1980), Indonesian football striker
- Beto Navarro (born 1989), American soccer defender
- Zé Beto (1960–1990), Portuguese footballer

==== Other sports ====
- Bobby Ávila (1924–2004), Mexican Major League Baseball player
- Roberto Seabra (born 1976), Brazilian water polo player

=== Other ===
- Beto Laudisio (died 2012), Brazilian student who died in Australian police custody
- Beto Ortiz (born 1968), Peruvian journalist, TV personality, and writer
- Carlos Alberto Rentería Mantilla (born 1945), Colombian narcotrafficker and crime boss

== Surname ==
- George Beto (1916–1991), American criminologist, educator
  - Cruz v. Beto, a 1972 United States Supreme Court case against George Beto

== See also ==
- Berto
