= Dean Young (poet) =

American poet (1955–2022)

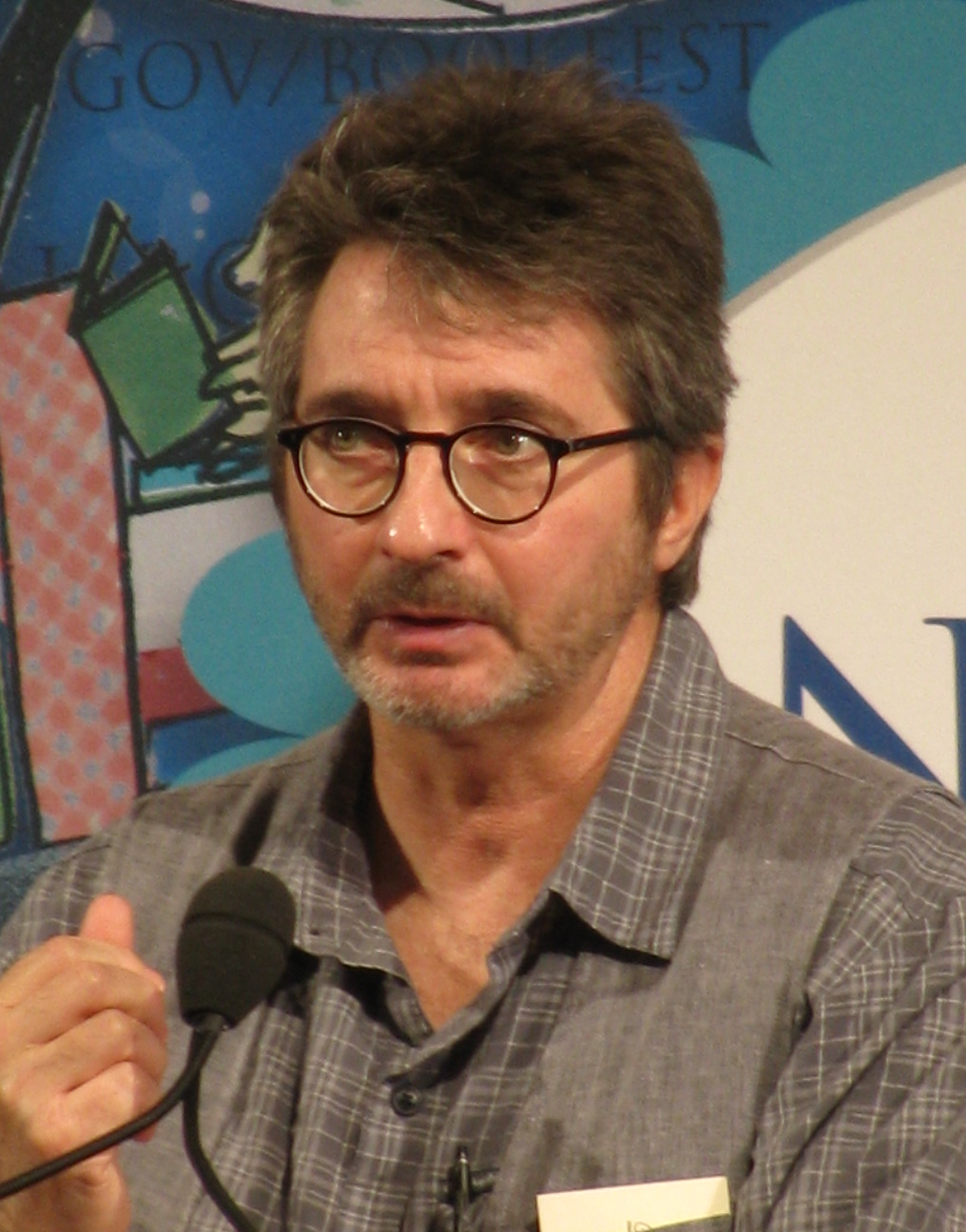
- at the 2013 National Bookfest
- Born: 1955; Columbia, Pennsylvania, U.S.
- Died: August 23, 2022 (aged 67); Cincinnati, Ohio, U.S.
- Education: Indiana University, Bloomington (MFA)
- Occupation: Poet

Dean Young (1955 – August 23, 2022) was an American poet in the lineage of John Ashbery, Frank O'Hara, and Kenneth Koch. Often cited as a second-generation New York School poet, Young also derived influence and inspiration from the work of André Breton, Paul Éluard, and the other French Surrealist poets.

== Life and career ==
Dean Young was born in Columbia, Pennsylvania in 1955. He received his MFA from Indiana University.

In 2008, Young became the William Livingston Chair of Poetry of the Michener Center for Writers at the University of Texas at Austin.

His later books included Solar Perplexus, Bender: New and Selected Poems, and Fall Higher.

In an interview, Young said his poems are about misunderstanding and that tying meaning too closely with understanding is not the intent of his poetry. He found the process of creation to be more important than the work itself: his poems are more demonstrations than explanations. He also found that using mangled quotes from technical journals, as he experimented with in First Course in Turbulence, allowed for a kind of collage in which tones confront each other. Citing Breton as an influence, Young found surrealism useful in understanding the imagination and removing the boundaries between real and unreal.

In 2011, Young had a heart transplant. The possibility of his death and encounters with impermanence became frequent themes in his poetry, especially in Fall Higher, which was published days after his transplant.

Young died from complications of COVID-19 at Good Samaritan Hospital in Cincinnati, Ohio, on August 23, 2022. He was 67. In announcing his passing, Copper Canyon Press also shared that Young had submitted an as-yet unpublished manuscript, whose final lines were: "Some cries never reach us/Even though they're our own. The best endings are abrupt."

== Awards ==
Young was awarded the Colorado Prize for Poetry for Strike Anywhere, has received a Stegner Fellowship from Stanford University, and has been awarded fellowships by the John Simon Guggenheim Memorial Foundation (2002) as well as from the National Endowment for the Arts and the Fine Arts Work Center in Provincetown, Massachusetts. His work has been included in The Best American Poetry anthology multiple times, dating back to 1993.

Elegy on Toy Piano (2005), was a finalist for the Pulitzer Prize for Poetry.

Young was the Poet Laureate for Texas in 2014.

== Bibliography ==
=== Collections ===
- Design with X (1988)
- Beloved Infidel (1992) Originally published by Wesleyan University Press.
- Strike Anywhere (1995)
- First Course in Turbulence (1999)
- Skid (2002)
- Ready-Made Bouquet (Published by Stride, ISBN 9781900152990, 2005)
- Elegy on Toy Piano (2005)
- Embryoyo (2007)
- Primitive Mentor (2008) (shortlisted for the 2009 International Griffin Poetry Prize)
- 7 Poets, 4 Days, 1 Book (Trinity University Press, 2009)
- 31 Poems, 1988-2008 (published by Forklift, Ink, 2009)
- The Foggist (2009)
- The Art of Recklessness (Graywolf Press, 2010)
- Fall Higher (Copper Canyon Press, 2011)
- Bender: New and Selected Poems (Copper Canyon Press, 2012)
- Shock by Shock (Copper Canyon Press, 2015)
- Solar Perplexus (Copper Canyon Press, 2019)
- Creature Feature (Copper Canyon Press, 2026)

=== List of poems ===
- PoemHunter.com - Some poems by Dean Young.
- Ode to Hangover - text and audio file of Young reading the poem aloud.
- Poem Without Forgiveness from the Paris Review
- The Business of Love is Cruelty poem by Dean Young
- Three poems from Jacket Magazine
- Exit Ovidian, poem from Boston Review
- Flood Plain, poem from Pool Magazine
- Acceptance Speech, from Poetry Magazine
- Bronzed, from Poetry Magazine

| Title | Year | First published | Reprinted/collected |
|---|---|---|---|
| Another lethal party favor | 2013 | Young, Dean (October 28, 2013). "Another lethal party favor". The New Yorker. Vol. 89, no. 34. p. 35. | |
