= Larry D. Thomas =

American poet

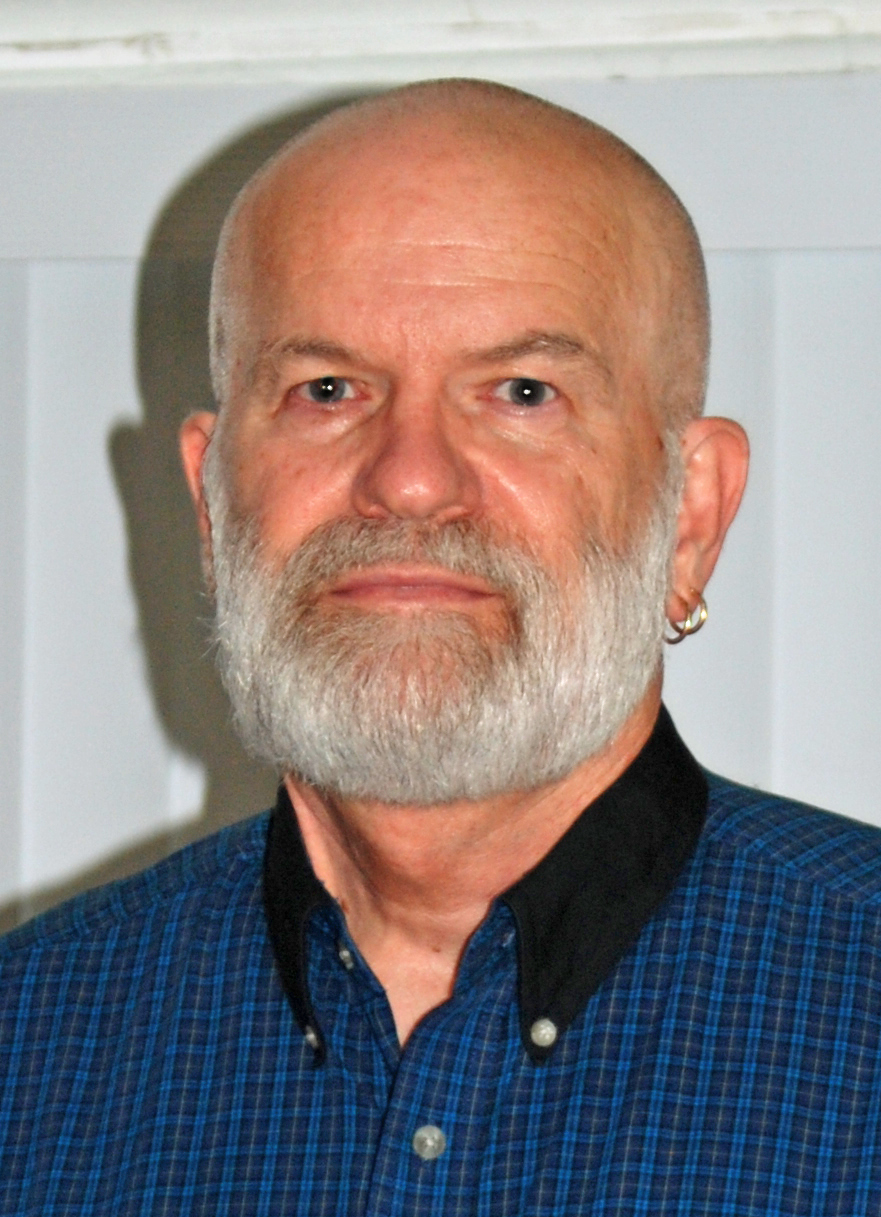
- Larry D. Thomas, 2006
- Born: 1947 (age 78–79); Haskell, Texas, U.S.
- Education: University of Houston
- Occupation: Poet
- Writing career
- Language: English
- Genre: Poetry
- Website: www.larrydthomas.com

Larry D. Thomas (born 1947) is an American poet. He was the 2008 Texas Poet Laureate, and in 2009 was inducted into the Texas Institute of Letters.

== Early life and education ==
Thomas was born in Haskell, Texas in 1947. He attended the University of Houston, where he earned a Bachelor's in English in 1970.

== Career ==
=== Early career ===
While earning his degree Thomas worked as a social services caseworker. He was drafted into the Navy after graduation. His orders had placed him in Norfolk, Virginia, where he worked as a prison counselor for the naval base. Thomas continued to work in the prison system after his discharge, working in the adult probation field in Houston, Texas.

=== Writing career ===
Thomas began writing while he was in the service and continued writing after he retired in 1998. His first collection of poetry, The Lighthouse Keeper, was published in January 2001 through Timberline Press. That same year he published Amazing Grace through the Texas Review Press. The collection won several prizes, which included the 2003 Western Heritage Wrangler Award. Thomas would receive the award a second time in 2015 for The Goatherd and has since won other awards.

In April 2007 Thomas was appointed by the Texas Legislature as the 2008 Texas Poet Laureate and in 2009, was inducted into the Texas Institute of Letters.

== Awards ==
- 2003 and 2015: Western Heritage Wrangler Award
- 2004: Texas Review Poetry Prize (for Where Skulls Speak Wind)
- 2004: Violet Crown Book Award
- 2008: Texas Poet Laureate (appointed in 2007)
- 2009: Texas Institute of Letters

== Bibliography ==
- 2001: The Lighthouse Keeper (poetry chapbook), Timberline Press
- 2001: Amazing Grace (poems), Texas Review Press
- 2002: The Woodlanders (poetry chapbook), Pecan Grove Press
- 2004: Where Skulls Speak Wind (poems), Texas Review Press
- 2005: Stark Beauty (poems), Timberline Press
- 2007: With the Light of Apricots (poetry chapbook), Lily Press
- 2007: Eros (poetry chapbook), Slow Trains Literary Journal
- 2008: The Fraternity of Oblivion (poems), Timberline Press
- 2008: Larry D. Thomas: TCU Texas Poet Laureate Series (poems), TCU Press
- 2008: The Circus (poetry chapbook), Right Hand Pointing
- 2009: Plain Pine (poetry chapbook), Right Hand Pointing
- 2010: The Skin of Light (poems), Dalton Publishing
- 2010: Dark Pearls (poetry chapbook), LaNana Creek Press (Stephen F. Austin State University)
- 2010: Wolves (poetry chapbook), El Grito del Lobo Press (Fulton, MO)
- 2010: Five Lavender Minutes of an Afternoon (poetry chapbook), Right Hand Pointing
- 2011: A Murder of Crows (poems), Virtual Artists Collective
- 2011: The Red, Candle-lit Darkness (poetry chapbook), El Grito del Lobo Press (Fulton, MO)
- 2011: Far (West Texas) (poetry chapbook), Right Hand Pointing
- 2012: Social Networks (poetry chapbook), Right Hand Pointing
- 2013: Uncle Ernest (poems), Virtual Artists Collective
- 2013: Colors (poetry chapbook), Right Hand Pointing
- 2014: The Lobsterman's Dream: (Poems of the Coast of Maine), El Grito del Lobo Press (Fulton, MO)
- 2014: The Goatherd (poetry chapbook), Mouthfeel Press (El Paso, TX)
- 2014: Art Museums (poetry chapbook), Blue Horse Press (Los Angeles, CA)
- 2014: The Wadded Up Poem Behind the Dumpster (poetry chapbook), Right Hand Pointing
- 2015: As If Light Actually Matters: New & Selected Poems, (Texas Review Press)
- 2015: Los Dias de los Muertos (poetry chapbook), Right Hand Pointing
- 2015: Goodbye Mexico: Poems of Remembrance (contributor), Texas Review Press
- 2016: The Circus (poetry chapbook, revised print edition), Blue Horse Press (Los Angeles, CA)
- 2016: Jake & Violet (poetry chapbook), Right Hand Pointing
- 2016: El Padre (poetry chapbook), nodding onion (Virtual Artists Collective, Chicago)
- 2016: Bleak Music: Photographs and Poems of the American Southwest, Blue Horse Press (Los Angeles, CA)
- 2016: Placido (poetry chapbook), nodding onion (Virtual Artists Collective, Chicago)
- 2017: Pecos (poetry chapbook), Right Hand Pointing
- 2017: "The Emperor of Ice-Cream" (poetry chapbook), Right Hand Pointing
- 2018: Luz: a demanding, elusive, and indomitable muse (poetry chapbook), Right Hand Pointing
- 2018: The Innkeeper (poetry chapbook), Mouthfeel Press (El Paso, TX)
- 2019: Boiling It Down: The Electronic Poetry Chapbooks of Larry D. Thomas, Blue Horse Press (Redondo Beach, CA)
- 2019: Ten Ways of Looking at an Earthworm (poetry chapbook), Right Hand Pointing
- 2019: In a Field of Cotton: Mississippi River Delta Poems, Blue Horse Press (Redondo Beach, CA)
- 2020: Journeying with the Owl, (poetry chapbook) Right Hand Pointing
