= Berto =

Berto is a surname and a first name, and a hypocorism in Portuguese and Spanish languages for given names ending in "-berto": Adalberto, Adelberto, Adilberto, Agberto, Agilberto, Agliberto, Aiberto, Alberto, Albertino, Aldeberto, Aldoberto, Aliberto, Amalberto, Amberto, Analberto, Andeberto, Angilberto, Ansberto, Ariberto, Auberto, Audoberto, Auriberto, Ausberto, Austreberto, Austroberto, Autberto, Baldoberto, Berthony, Bertino, Berto, Calberto, Cariberto, Childeberto, Clauberto, Cloroberto, Colberto, Coloberto, Cuniberto, Cutberto, Dagoberto, Dalberto, Delberto, Dilberto, Diliberto, Eadberto, Ecberto, Edberto, Edelberto, Ediberto, Edilberto, Egberto, Eguiberto, Elberto, Eliberto, Elisberto, Emeberto, Engelberto, Erberto, Eriberto, Erisberto, Etelberto, Euberto, Felisberto, Filberto, Filiberto, Flauberto, Floriberto, Folberto, Framberto, Froberto, Frodoberto, Fulberto, Galberto, Gaudiberto, Gerberto, Geriberto, Gesilberto, Gilberto, Gisberto, Giselberto, Gisilberto, Glauberto, Godeberto, Godoberto, Gomberto, Gualberto, Gundeberto, Gundelberto, Gundiperto, Heberto, Herberto, Heriberto, Hilberto, Hildeberto, Huberto, Hugoberto, Humberto, Idalberto, Idelberto, Ingberto, Isberto, Isamberto, Josiberto, Kuniberto, Lamberto, Landeberto, Leoberto, Liberto, Lindoberto, Luzberto, Madalberto, Madelberto, Mamerto, Nilberto, Nolberto, Norberto, Oberto, Odeberto, Osberto, Ramberto, Raimberto, Ratberto, Regimberto, Reinberto, Remberto, Romberto, Rigoberto, Roberto, Rodiberto, Ruperto, Segisberto, Siberto, Sigeberto, Sigiberto, Sigiberto, Silberto, Teoberto, Teodoberto, Umberto, Walberto, Wamberto, Wigberto, Wilberto, Wiliberto, Valberto, Vigberto. The stem "-berto" is a Romance languages variant of German "-bert", which comes from the Old Germanic Berht (brightness or radiance).

Notable people with the name include:

== Nickname ==
- Berto (footballer), Alberto Martínez Díaz (born 1962), Spanish footballer
- Humberto "Berto" Carrillo (born 1995), Mexican professional wrestler

== Surname ==
- Andre Berto (born 1983), American-Haitian professional boxer
- Juliet Berto (1947–1990), French actress, first wife of Michal
- Giuseppe Berto (1914–1978), Italian novelist and screenwriter
- Michel Berto (1939–1995), French actor, husband of actresses Juliet and Marie

== See also ==
- Beto
