= Mildred Vorpahl Baass =

American poet (1917–2012)

Mildred Vorpahl Baass (April 15, 1917 – November 4, 2012) was an American poet. She served as the Poet Laureate of Texas from 1993 to 1995.

Baass was born in San Antonio, Texas, on April 15, 1917, to Alfred H. Vorpahl Sr. and Ida M. Keller Vorpahl. She was widowed during her first marriage when her husband, Lt. A. M. Hutchison Jr. of the United States Army Air Forces, was shot down and declared killed in action during World War II. She married her second husband, Judge Alfred C. Baass, on May 9, 1946. Baass had two daughters, Carol Sowa and Nancy Baass.

A resident of Victoria, Texas, Mildred Vorpahl Baass died on November 4, 2012, at the age of 95.
