= Emmy Pérez =

American poet & writer

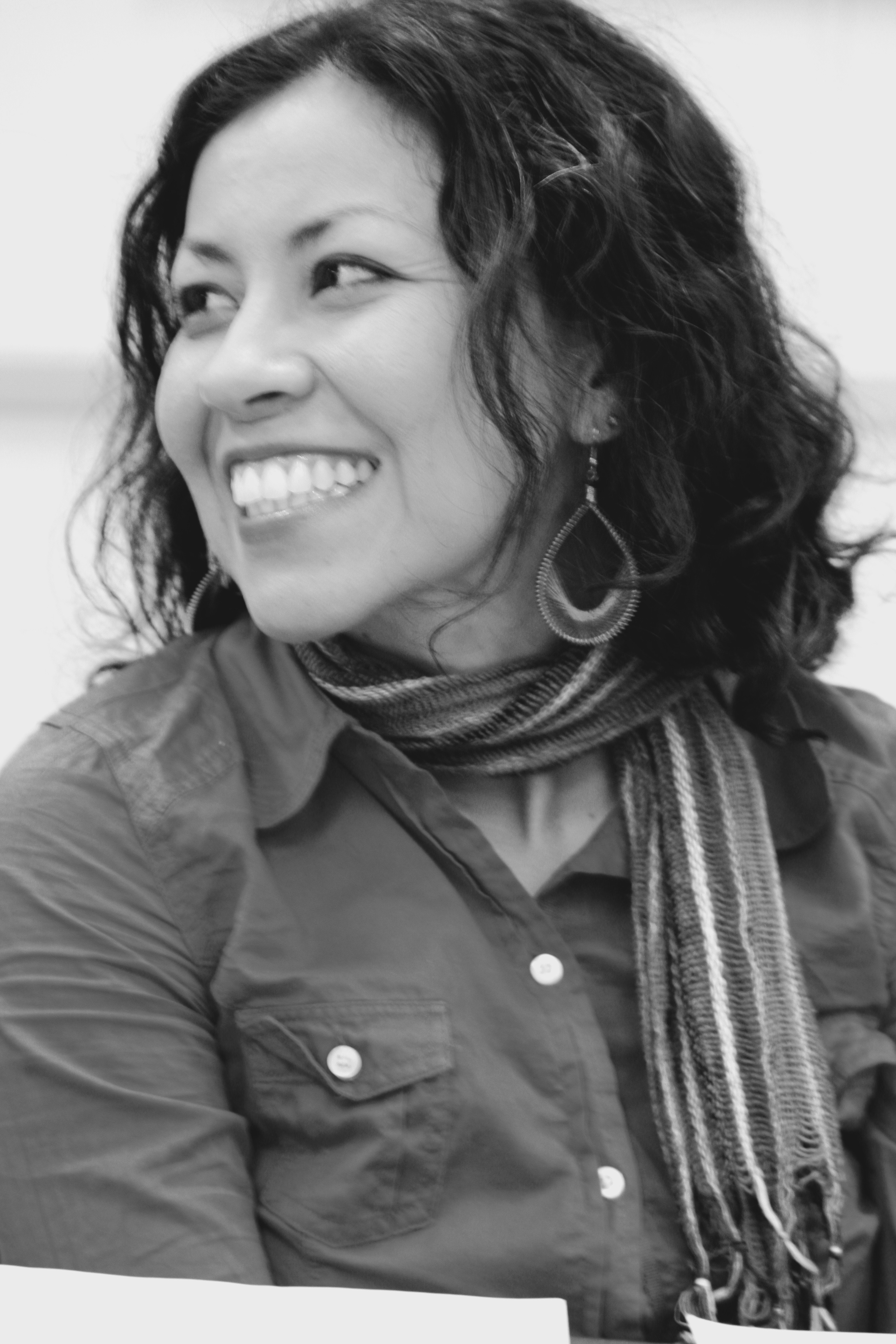
- Education: University of Southern California (BA); Columbia University (MFA)
- Occupations: Poet; Writer; Professor
- Writing career
- Genre: Poetry Chicanx Literature
- Subject: borderlands
- Notable work: With the River on Our Face
- Website: emmyperez.com/about.html

Emmy Pérez is a Chicanx poet and writer originally from Santa Ana, California, United States. She was a recipient of a National Endowment for the Arts Poetry Fellowship in 2017. She has lived in the borderlands of Texas since 2000, where she has taught creative writing in college and MFA programs, as well as in detention facilities and as part of social justice projects. Her latest collective is Poets Against the Border Wall. She was also a fellow (2010–12) and organizing committee member of CantoMundo (2018–19) and is a long-time member of Macondo Writers Workshop.

She is best known for her collections, With the River on Our Face and Solstice.

She received the 2009 Alfredo Cisneros del Moral award for her writing, an award started by Sandra Cisneros. Previously, she received the James D. Phelan Literary Award from the San Francisco Foundation.

In 2019, she was named the Poet Laureate for Texas for 2020. She began her stewardship in March 2020.

== Biography and reception ==
She graduated from University of Southern California with an undergraduate degree, and received her MFA from Columbia University. She teaches at The University of Texas Rio Grande Valley where she is a full professor. She is also the associate director for the Center of Mexican Studies.

She has been the recipient of many prestigious awards and fellowships, including, but not limited to: the New York Foundation for the Arts, the Fine Arts Work Center in Provincetown, and the Ucross Foundation.

== Bibliography ==
Pérez has written two books, With the River on Our Face and Solstice. With the River on Our Face is a poetry collection book written about Texas' Southwest borderlands. Each poem in the book talks about the life in the south borders of Texas along the Rio Grande Valley and how lives are affected by politics and global forces.

== Works ==
Collections

- With the River on Our Face Tucson : The University of Arizona Press, 2016. ISBN 9780816533442, OCLC 939911179
- Solstice Sacramento, CA : Swan Scythe Press, 2011. ISBN 9781930454316, OCLC 795631917

Poems

- [No Strawberry Moon] from Poem a Day with audio No Strawberry Moon
- Not One More Refugee Death at the Poetry Foundation website. Not one more refugee death
- Downriver Río Grande Ghazalion from With the River on Our Face Downriver Río Grande Ghazalion
- Halladay Street from Solstice Halladay Street
- NEA for Poetry List 2017 NEA fellows
- Texas Poets Laureate list Texas poets laureate
- CantoMundo Organizing Committee CantoMundo
- Alfredo Cisneros de Moral Writing Award 2009 Cisneros Writing Award 2019
