= Poet Laureate of Texas =

Official poets for the state of Texas

- Incumbent; Lupe Mendez since 2022
- Type: Poet laureate
- Formation: 1932
- First holder: Judd Mortimer Lewis

The poet laureate of Texas is the poet laureate for the U.S. state of Texas. The Texas State Legislature designates the poet laureate of Texas during each Legislative Session based on nominations from the Texas Commission on the Arts.

== List of poets laureate ==
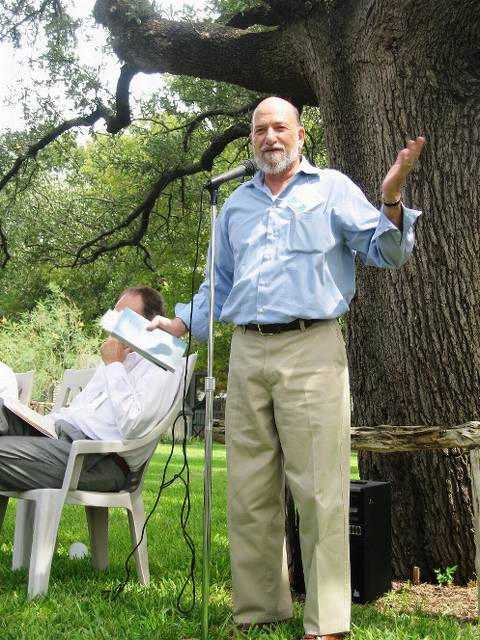
Jack Elliott Myers was poet laureate in 2003

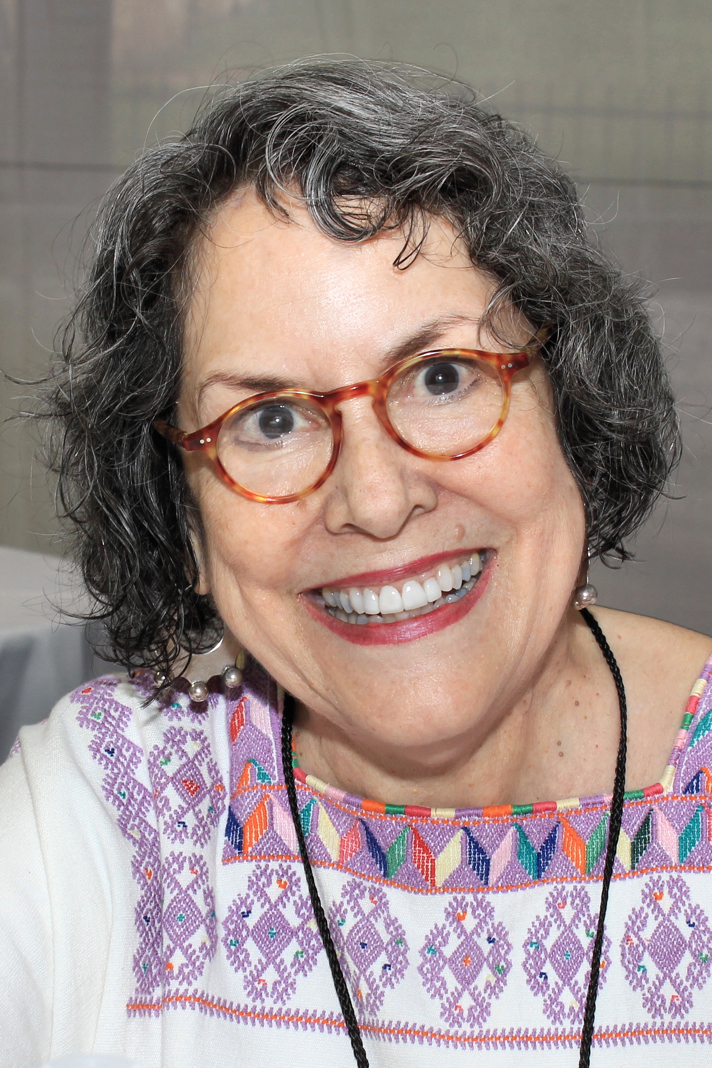
Rosemary Catacalos was poet laureate in 2013

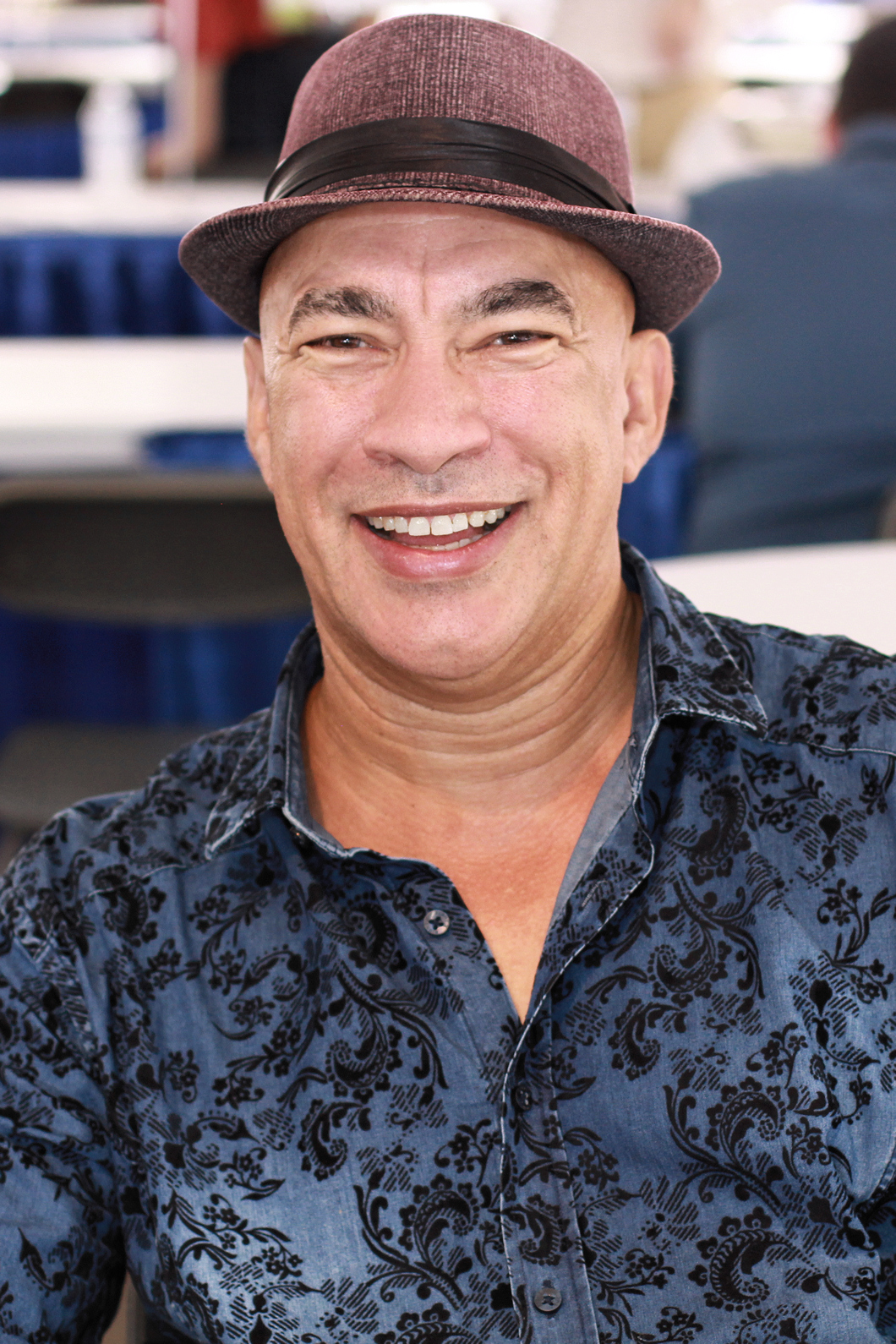
Cyrus Cassells was poet laureate in 2021

- 1932-1934 - Judd Mortimer Lewis
- 1935 Pearle Moore Stevens - On April 8, 1935, the State of Texas honored her by declaring her "Poet Laureate of Texas" and declaring her book of poetry "The Shadows of Dawn" as Book Of The Year.
- 1934-1936 - Aline T. Michaelis
- 1936-1939 - Grace Noll Crowell
- 1939-1941 - Lexie Dean Robertson
- 1941-1943 - Nancy Richey Ranson
- 1943-1945 - Dollilee Davis Smith
- 1945-1947 - David Riley Russell
- 1947-1949 - Aline B. Carter
- 1949-1951 - Carlos Ashley
- 1951-1953 - Arthur M. Sampley
- 1953-1955 - Mildred Lindsey Raiborn
- 1955-1957 - Pierre Bernard Hill
- 1957-1959 - Margaret Royalty Edwards
- 1959-1961 - J. V. Chandler
- 1961 - Lorena Simon
- 1962 - Marvin Davis Winsett
- 1963 - Gwendolyn Bennett Pappas
- 1964-1965 - Jenny Lind Porter
- 1966 - Bessie Maas Rowe
- 1967 - William. E. Bard
- 1968 - Kathryn Henry Harris
- 1969-1970 - Anne B. Marely
- 1970-1971 - Robby K. Mitchell
- 1971-1972 - Terry Fontenot
- 1972-1973 - Mrs. Clark Gresham
- 1973-1974 - Violette Newton
- 1974-1975 - Lila Todd O'Neil
- 1975-1976 - Ethel Osborn Hill
- 1976-1977 - Florice Stripling Jeffers
- 1977-1978 - Ruth Carruth
- 1978-1979 - Patsy Stodghill
- 1979-1980 - Dorothy B. Elfstroman
- 1980-1981 - Weems S. Dykes
- 1982-1983 - William D. Barney
- 1987-1988 - Ruth E. Reuther
- 1988-1989 - Vassar Miller
- 1993-1995 - Mildred Vorpahl Baass
- 2000 - James Hoggard
- 2001 - Walter McDonald
- 2002 - No one designated
- 2003 - Jack Elliott Myers
- 2004 - Cleatus Rattan
- 2005 - Alan Birkelbach
- 2006 - Red Steagall
- 2007 - Steven Fromholz
- 2008 - Larry D. Thomas
- 2009 - Paul Ruffin
- 2010 - Karla K. Morton
- 2011 - David M. Parsons
- 2012 - Jan Seale
- 2013 - Rosemary Catacalos
- 2014 - Dean Young
- 2015 - Carmen Tafolla
- 2016 - Laurie Ann Guerrero
- 2017 - Jenny Browne
- 2018 - Carol Coffee Reposa
- 2019 - Carrie Fountain
- 2020 - Emmy Pérez
- 2021 - Cyrus Cassells
- 2022 - Lupe Mendez
- 2023 - ire'ne lara silva
- 2024 – Amanda Johnston
- 2025 - Octavio Quintanilla
- 2026 - Kevin Prufer

== See also ==
- Poet laureate
- List of U.S. state poets laureate
- United States Poet Laureate
