= Jenny Lind Porter =

American poet and teacher (1927–2020)

- Born: September 3, 1927; Fort Worth, Texas, U.S.
- Died: June 27, 2020 (aged 92); Austin, Texas, U.S.
- Resting place: Texas State Cemetery
- Education: Texas Christian University (BA, MA); University of Texas at Austin (PhD)
- Occupations: Poet, professor

Jenny Lind Porter (September 3, 1927 – June 27, 2020) was an American poet and teacher, and Poet Laureate of Texas from 1964 to 1965. She taught at multiple universities in Texas and was named one of the Outstanding Educators of America.

== Early life and education ==
Porter was born in Fort Worth, Texas, on September 3, 1927, and grew up in Azle, a nearby town. Her mother named her after the Swedish opera singer Jenny Lind. Her mother would also read her poetry at a young age, to which Porter credits her own love of poetry. She published her first poem at the age of 14, a piece entitled "Mr. Johnson Goes to Washington" about Lyndon B. Johnson. She graduated from Paschal High School in 1944.

Porter earned her Bachelor of Arts degree from Texas Christian University in 1948, followed by a Master of Arts in 1949. She earned her PhD in English from the University of Texas at Austin in 1957, the youngest woman to receive a PhD from the school at the time. Describing her work, dean Harry Ransom said she was "distinguished by scholarship without dust".

== Career ==
Porter taught English at West Texas State University from 1959 to 1961. She also taught at Southwest Texas State College and served as the Chair of the English department at Texas Lutheran College. In 1968, she started teaching English at Huston-Tillotson College, becoming chair of their English department in 1970, going on to launch their creative writing program.

In 1964, Porter was selected as Poet Laureate of Texas by governor John Connally. In 1981, she established the Texas Poets' Corner at West Texas A&M University, donating from her own collection of rare books and artwork. Based in the Cornette Library of the university, the area is intended to expose students to poetry and other literature.

In 1981, Porter published The Siege of the Alamo, a poem that film historian Frank Thompson called "uncommonly beautiful", praising its contrast to the typical descriptions of the Battle of the Alamo.

== Death and legacy ==
Porter died on June 27, 2020, in Austin, Texas, and was buried at Texas State Cemetery. She left a $2.8 million estate gift to West Texas A&M University, intended to both expand the collection at the Poets' Corner and establish multiple professor positions in English and other subjects.

Poet Jesse Stuart described Porter as "America's new Emily Dickinson".

In 2020, the bass-baritone and performing artist, Odekhiren Amaize published recitals of Jenny Lind Porter’s dramatic monologues: “Mona Lisa” by da Vinci, and “Bound Captive” depicting Michelangelo’s statue the “Dying Slave”.

== Selected works ==
- The Lantern of Diogenes (1954)
- Azle and the Attic Room (1957)
- Three Dramatic Monologues: da Vinci, Michelangelo, Rembrandt (1978)
- The Siege of the Alamo (1981)

== Awards and honors ==
- 1953, received the D.A. Frank poetry prize
- 1970, received the Alice Fay Di Castagnola Award from the Poetry Society of America
- 1971, named an Outstanding Educator of America
- 1976, inducted into the Philosophical Society of Texas, one of the first women to be included
- 1979, received the Distinguished Diploma of Honor from Pepperdine University, the only woman to receive this honor at the time
- 1981, received the Dr. A. Joseph Armstrong Browning Memorial Award
- 1985, inducted into the Texas Women's Hall of Fame
