= Lupe Mendez =

American poet and educator

- Mendez at the 2026 Texas Book Festival
- Born: 1976 (age 49–50); Jalisco, Mexico
- Education: University of St. Thomas; University of Texas at El Paso
- Occupations: Poet; educator; literary arts organizer
- Employer: Houston Independent School District
- Title: Texas Poet Laureate (2022–2023)
- Writing career
- Pen name: Guadalupe "Lupe" Mendez
- Period: c. 1990s–present
- Genre: Latino expatriate poetry
- Notable awards: John A. Robertson Award for Best First Book of Poetry (Texas Institute of Letters: 2020)
- Movement: Librotraficante
- Website: thepoetmendez.org

Lupe Mendez (also credited as Guadalupe "Lupe" Mendez; born 1976) is an American poet, educator, and literary arts organizer based in Houston, Texas. He served as the 2022–2023 Texas Poet Laureate. His debut collection, Why I Am Like Tequila, won the John A. Robertson Award for Best First Book of Poetry, awarded by the Texas Institute of Letters in 2020.

== Early life and education ==
Mendez was born in 1976 in Jalisco, Mexico, and grew up in Galveston, Texas. He attended the University of St. Thomas and later graduated with an Master of Fine Arts in creative writing from the University of Texas at El Paso.

== Career ==
Mendez worked as an educator in Houston and was active in literary outreach and community-based programming. According to the Houston Chronicle, he served as an educator with the Houston Independent School District and was involved in Houston's literary community.

He is associated with literary organizing in Texas, including work connected to the Librotraficante movement and the founding of Tintero Projects, a Houston-based organization supporting emerging Latinx writers and writers of color in the Gulf Coast region.

Mendez was appointed Texas Poet Laureate for 2022 (serving 2022–2023). The Texas Observer highlighted his outreach to diverse communities and his interest in programming beyond the honorary title.

== Notable works ==
- Mendez, Lupe (2019). Why I Am Like Tequila. Willow Publishing. ISBN 978-1732209176.
- Mendez, Lupe (2025). Prayer Holding Night: New & Selected Works. TCU Press. ISBN 9780875659282.
- Mendez, Lupe (2026). We Exist in the Whisper: Huelga School Verses. Arte Publico Press. ISBN 9798893750300.

== Awards and honors ==
- John A. Robertson Award for Best First Book of Poetry (Texas Institute of Letters: 2020), for Why I Am Like Tequila.
