= San Jose Mission Pottery =

San Jose Mission Potteries
- Industry: Ceramic manufacturing
- Founded: 1931
- Defunct: 1977
- Fate: Dissolved
- Headquarters: San Antonio, Texas, United States
- Products: Ceramic art ware, dinnerware and tile

San Jose Mission Potteries refers to a group of tile and pottery workshops founded by Ethel Wilson Harris in the San Antonio, Texas area starting in the 1930s.

== History ==
Ethel Harris was a great enthusiast of traditional Mexican art, and the three potteries – Mexican Arts & Crafts, San Jose Potteries, and Mission Crafts – provided an outlet for Mexican artisans to produce native-inspired ceramic designs. Her first pottery company: Mexican Arts & Crafts (MAC), launched in 1931. The pottery opened in the granary of the Mission San José. A small shop attached to the pottery sold wares promoting Mexican-influenced design to area tourists.

Harris hired a principal designer, Fernando Ramos, while he was still a high school student. Ramos was responsible for the collective potteries’ well-known scenes of Mexican life, local culture and dancers. He left in 1934 to take up dancing full-time and studied Spanish, Mexican and Gypsy dance in Mexico. Along the way, he met and married another dancer, Carla Montel. The pair became a popular dance team in the 1940s, appearing in nightclubs and movies. Flamenco dance themes are common in MAC pottery. In the late 1930s, Harris copyrighted Ramos’s designs, and continued to use them for many years after his departure, in all three incarnations of her pottery workshops.

Her workshops gained additional exposure through participation at the 1933 Chicago World’s Fair. By 1934, Harris’s success led to expansion with San Jose Pottery, started up as a production facility for the smaller MAC workshop, which couldn’t support the kilns needed for tile manufacture. San Jose Pottery also manufactured a line of dinner-, art and tileware known as “Pan American Ware.” These pieces featured Colonial, Western, Indian and Mexican scenes.

Harris left San Jose Pottery in 1937 following a disagreement with the president and partial owner of the company, Cecil Beck. As part of the split, she retained rights to all of the designs produced by the company. The Calla Lily dinnerware line that San Jose Pottery is known for was produced after Harris left the company. Beck sold the company to a New York firm in 1941. The pottery burnt to the ground in 1944. Unable to resume operations, the company went out of business and the building was razed in 1947.

Concurrently with her work at San Jose Pottery, the workshop began producing tile murals and wrought iron tile tables for the 1936 Texas Centennial Exposition. MAC/San Jose Potteries also produced wares for the 1939 New York World's Fair.

Harris continued her work with MAC. In 1939, Harris joined the Arts and Crafts Division of the Work Projects Administration (WPA) as a technical supervisor. During this period, she brought 60 WPA artisans into the workshop. Items produced during that period include tilework for public spaces, dinnerware for needy families and other public works. She left the WPA in 1941 to manage the San Jose Mission State park, and moved into living quarters in the mission. The third iteration of her workshop, Mission Crafts, was launched in 1941. This larger workshop featured both more space and a bigger kiln. They collaborated with local iron artisans and produced tilework in wrought-iron frames and tables. Harris eventually retired in 1963, when her son took over the business. Mission Crafts closed in 1977 due to increased production costs.

In 2021, artisan Marcie Anguiano, revived the Mission Crafts brand near Mission San Jose. Inspired by the heritage of the San Jose Pottery and local artisans the shop specializes in Marcie's fragrance artistry and items made in the area.
