= Beto O'Byrne =

Multiethnic playwright based in Brooklyn, New York

- Born: White Oak, Texas
- Education: University of Southern California
- Occupation: Playwright
- Writing career
- Movement: Chicano
- Website: Official website

Beto O'Byrne is a multiethnic playwright based in Brooklyn, New York. He has written 14 full-length plays which been produced in major cities including New York City, Austin, San Antonio, and Los Angeles. He has been nominated for numerous awards and has participated in playwright festivals across the United States. He is perhaps best known for founding the multiethnic theater collective Radical Evolution.

== Biographical Information ==
Beto O'Byrne was born and raised in White Oak, a small city in the northeastern part of Texas. Ethnically, he self-identifies "as a mixed-Latino of Mexican and Irish heritage from the complicated state of Tejas". In 2002, he received a bachelor's degree in Writing from Northwestern State University, and in 2010 graduated from the University of Southern California where he received a Master of Fine Arts degree in Dramatic Writing. After graduate school, O'Byrne began working as the artistic director at the Austin Latino Theater Alliance (ALTA). He greatly expanded the organization, creating the ALTA Performing Arts Showcase and an "annual Chicano holiday theatrical" that brings together many of Austin's Chicano community members, organizations, and artists. While working with ALTA, O'Byrne also directed his first major production, La Pastorela. In 2010, he co-founded the USC MFA Drama Club at the University of Southern California.

In 2011, he moved to Brooklyn, New York where he co-founded the Radical Evolution Performance Group with fellow theatre maker Meropi Peponides. Since 2011, O'Byrne has lived in Brooklyn working at Radical Evolution, producing and writing theater pieces. He also worked at the Stella Adler Studio of Acting, where he was the playwright in residence in 2016. In 2015, O'Byrne became a founding member of La Coopertiva of NYC Latin@ Theater Artists. As of 2017, he continues to work with Radical Evolution.

== Notable works ==
- Among the Sand and Smog (2006)
- Clover and Cactus (2010)
- Stumble and Fall (2010)
- Into the Pines (2011)
- year: 365 poems (2012)
- To Live is to Fly (2014)
- The Golden Drum Year (2015)
- Loving and Loving (201)

== Achievements ==
In over fifteen years of professional theater experience, Beto O'Byrne has many notable accomplishments. He was the runner-up for the National Latino Playwriting Award, an award given out the Arizona Theater Company given out annually to the best theatrical piece written by a Latino playwright. He has also participated in the Texas Black and Latino Playwriting Festival, INTAR Theatre's Maria Irene Fornes Hispanic Playwrights in Residence Laboratory, Lincoln Center Theater's Director's Lab, and Tofte Lake Arts Center Emerging Artists Residency. O'Byrne has also received a number of notable grants and commissions, including:

- The NET/TEN Travel Grant
- The FreeRange Commission
- The Puffin Foundation Grant
- The Clover and Cactus Playwrighting Commission
- 52nd St. Project TYA Playwrighting Commission

== Critical reception ==
=== Among the Sand and Smog ===
Among the Sand and Smog (2006) is one of O'Byrne's first plays. It addresses the unsolved murders of numerous women in Ciudad Juárez, Mexico, a city that lies just across the border from El Paso, Texas. The story follows the families of the victims after their disappearance, but in the final scene O'Byrne creates a dramatization of the final moments of the women. Critic Nicolette Good writes of the production, "Among the Sand and Smog hits home and is a powerfully written show that cuts through the issue to expose both truth and heart". The play was produced by the Cellar Theater at the San Pedro Playhouse in 2008. Since then, it has not been produced on a large scale.

=== Clover and Cactus ===
O'Byrne's 2010 play Clover and Cactus was commissioned by the Watts Village Theater Company (WVTC). The play tells the story of the St. Patrick's Battalion, a battalion of Irish-American immigrant soldiers who fought in the Mexican–American War. Theater critic Karen Jean Martinson stated in her review, "As the characters sounded the battle cry in the final moments of the play, I felt the urge to yell out in solidarity with them, with the hope that we can forge such bonds across the lines that currently divide us".

=== The Golden Drum Year ===
His most recent production, The Golden Drum Year (2015), is an adaptation of 365 poems written every day during O'Byrne's first year living in New York. The play is centered around the character Eugene, a young man who has recently moved to New York City and the people and experiences he encounters during his first year living there. This coming of age story was described by critic Rachel Abrams as "an artsy, expressionistic love poem to a diverse and dynamic NYC, and to anyone who’s searched for their purpose and their people in a new city". Critic Michelle DeBella writes that the play "assures us that despair is only temporary and if we wait it out, joy is just around the bend". The play was developed by Beto O'Byrne and Meropi Peponides, directed by Simón Adinia Hanukai, and produced by Radical Evolution. Its first staging ran through October 2015 at University Settlement in New York City.
