= 2018–19 UEFA Europa League =

48th season of Europe's secondary club football tournament organised by UEFA

- The Olympic Stadium in Baku hosted the final

Tournament details
- Dates: Qualifying: 26 June – 30 August 2018; Competition proper: 20 September 2018 – 29 May 2019
- Teams: Competition proper: 48+8; Total: 158+55 (from 55 associations)

Final positions
- Champions: (England) Chelsea (2nd title)
- Runners-up: (England) Arsenal

Tournament statistics
- Matches played: 205
- Goals scored: 565 (2.76 per match)
- Attendance: 5,038,109 (24,576 per match)
- Top scorer(s): Olivier Giroud (Chelsea); 11 goals
- Best player: Eden Hazard (Chelsea)

The 2018–19 UEFA Europa League was the 48th season of Europe's secondary club football tournament organised by UEFA, and the 10th season since it was renamed from the UEFA Cup to the UEFA Europa League.

The final was played at the Olympic Stadium in Baku, Azerbaijan, between English sides Chelsea and Arsenal. It was the first Europa League final to feature two teams from the same city, and marked the first time all four teams in European club competition finals were from the Premier League, with Liverpool and Tottenham competing in the Champions League final. Chelsea defeated Arsenal 4–1 and earned the right to play against Liverpool, the winners of the 2018–19 UEFA Champions League, in the 2019 UEFA Super Cup. As winners, Chelsea would also have been qualified for the 2019–20 UEFA Champions League group stage; however, since they had already qualified after finishing third in the Premier League, the berth reserved was given to the third-placed team of the 2018–19 Ligue 1 (Lyon) – the 5th-ranked association according to next season's access list.

For the first time, the video assistant referee (VAR) system was used in the competition, where it was implemented in the final.

As the title holders of the Europa League, Atlético Madrid qualified for the 2018–19 UEFA Champions League, although they had already qualified before the final through their league performance. They were unable to defend their title as they advanced to the Champions League knockout stage, and were eliminated by Juventus in the round of 16.

== Format changes ==
On 9 December 2016, UEFA confirmed the reforming plan for the UEFA Champions League for the 2018–2021 cycle, which was announced on 26 August 2016. As per the new regulations, all teams that are eliminated in the UEFA Champions League qualifying rounds will get a second chance in the Europa League.

== Association team allocation ==
213 teams from all 55 UEFA member associations participated in the 2018–19 UEFA Europa League. The association ranking based on the UEFA country coefficients was used to determine the number of participating teams for each association:

- Associations 1–51 (except Liechtenstein) each had three teams qualify.
- Associations 52–54 each had two teams qualify.
- Liechtenstein and Kosovo (association 55) each had one team qualify (Liechtenstein organised only a domestic cup and no domestic league; Kosovo as per decision by the UEFA Executive Committee).
- Moreover, 55 teams eliminated from the 2018–19 UEFA Champions League were transferred to the Europa League (default number was 57, but 2 fewer teams competed in the 2018–19 UEFA Champions League).

=== Association ranking ===
For the 2018–19 UEFA Europa League, the associations were allocated places according to their 2017 UEFA country coefficients, which took into account their performance in European competitions from 2012–13 to 2016–17.

Apart from the allocation based on the country coefficients, associations could have additional teams participating in the Champions League, as noted below:

- (UCL) – Additional teams transferred from the UEFA Champions League

Association ranking for 2018–19 UEFA Europa League

Rank	Association	Coeff.	Teams	Notes
1	Spain	104.998	3	+1 (UCL)
2	Germany	79.498	3	
3	England	75.962	3	
4	Italy	73.332	3	+2 (UCL)
5	France	56.665	3	
6	Russia	50.532	3	+1 (UCL)
7	Portugal	49.332	3	+1 (UCL)
8	Ukraine	42.633	3	+2 (UCL)
9	Belgium	42.400	3	+2 (UCL)
10	Turkey	39.200	3	+2 (UCL)
11	Czech Republic	33.175	3	+2 (UCL)
12	Switzerland	32.075	3	+1 (UCL)
13	Netherlands	31.063	3	
14	Greece	27.900	3	+1 (UCL)
15	Austria	25.350	3	+2 (UCL)
16	Croatia	25.250	3	+1 (UCL)
17	Romania	24.350	3	+1 (UCL)
18	Denmark	24.000	3	+1 (UCL)
19	Belarus	19.875	3	+1 (UCL)

Rank	Association	Coeff.	Teams	Notes
20	Poland	19.750	3	+1 (UCL)
21	Sweden	19.725	3	+1 (UCL)
22	Israel	19.375	3	+1 (UCL)
23	Scotland	18.925	3	+1 (UCL)
24	Cyprus	18.550	3	+1 (UCL)
25	Norway	18.325	3	+1 (UCL)
26	Azerbaijan	17.750	3	+1 (UCL)
27	Bulgaria	15.875	3	+1 (UCL)
28	Serbia	15.375	3	
29	Kazakhstan	15.250	3	+1 (UCL)
30	Slovenia	13.125	3	+1 (UCL)
31	Slovakia	11.750	3	+1 (UCL)
32	Liechtenstein	11.000	1	
33	Hungary	9.500	3	+1 (UCL)
34	Moldova	9.500	3	+1 (UCL)
35	Iceland	8.375	3	+1 (UCL)
36	Finland	7.650	3	+1 (UCL)
37	Albania	6.625	3	+1 (UCL)

Rank	Association	Coeff.	Teams	Notes
38	Republic of Ireland	6.575	3	+1 (UCL)
39	Bosnia and Herzegovina	6.500	3	+1 (UCL)
40	Georgia	6.375	3	+1 (UCL)
41	Latvia	6.125	3	+1 (UCL)
42	Macedonia	5.625	3	+1 (UCL)
43	Estonia	5.250	3	+1 (UCL)
44	Montenegro	5.250	3	+1 (UCL)
45	Armenia	5.125	3	+1 (UCL)
46	Luxembourg	4.875	3	+1 (UCL)
47	Northern Ireland	4.500	3	+1 (UCL)
48	Lithuania	4.125	3	+1 (UCL)
49	Malta	4.000	3	+1 (UCL)
50	Wales	3.875	3	+1 (UCL)
51	Faroe Islands	3.500	3	+1 (UCL)
52	Gibraltar	2.500	2	+1 (UCL)
53	Andorra	1.165	2	+1 (UCL)
54	San Marino	0.333	2	+1 (UCL)
55	Kosovo	0.000	1	+1 (UCL)

=== Distribution ===
In the default access list, originally 17 losers from the Champions League first qualifying round were transferred to the Europa League second qualifying round (Champions Path). However, one fewer loser would be transferred since the Champions League title holders already qualified for the group stage via their domestic league. Therefore, only 19 teams entered the Champions Path second qualifying round (one of the losers from the Champions League first qualifying round would be drawn to receive a bye to the third qualifying round).

In addition, originally three losers from the Champions League second qualifying round (League Path) were transferred to the Europa League third qualifying round (Main Path). However, one fewer loser would be transferred since the Europa League title holders already qualified for the group stage via their domestic league. As a result, the following changes to the access list was made:

- The cup winners of association 18 (Denmark) entered the third qualifying round instead of the second qualifying round.
- The cup winners of association 25 (Norway) entered the second qualifying round instead of the first qualifying round.
- The cup winners of associations 50 (Wales) and 51 (Faroe Islands) entered the first qualifying round instead of the preliminary round.

Access list for 2018–19 UEFA Europa League
		Teams entering in this round	Teams advancing from previous round	Teams transferred from Champions League
Preliminary round (14 teams)		4 domestic cup winners from associations 52–55; 6 domestic league runners-up from associations 49–54; 4 domestic league third-placed teams from associations 48–51		
First qualifying round (94 teams)		26 domestic cup winners from associations 26–51; 30 domestic league runners-up from associations 18–48 (except Liechtenstein); 31 domestic league third-placed teams from associations 16–47 (except Liechtenstein)	7 winners from preliminary round	
Second qualifying round	Champions Path (18 teams)			15 losers from Champions League first qualifying round; 3 losers from Champions League preliminary round
Second qualifying round	Main Path (74 teams)	7 domestic cup winners from associations 19–25; 2 domestic league runners-up from associations 16–17; 3 domestic league third-placed teams from associations 13–15; 9 domestic league fourth-placed teams from associations 7–15; 2 domestic league fifth-placed teams from associations 5–6 (League Cup winners for France); 4 domestic league sixth-placed teams from associations 1–4 (League Cup winners for England)	47 winners from first qualifying round	
Third qualifying round	Champions Path (20 teams)		9 winners from second qualifying round (Champions Path)	10 losers from Champions League second qualifying round (Champions Path); 1 losers from Champions League first qualifying round (Champions Path)
Third qualifying round	Main Path (52 teams)	6 domestic cup winners from associations 13–18; 6 domestic league third-placed teams from associations 7–12; 1 domestic league fourth-placed team from association 6	37 winners from second qualifying round (Main Path)	2 losers from Champions League second qualifying round (League Path)
Play-off round	Champions Path (16 teams)		10 winners from third qualifying round (Champions Path)	6 losers from Champions League third qualifying round (Champions Path)
Play-off round	Main Path (26 teams)		26 winners from third qualifying round (Main Path)	
Group stage (48 teams)		12 domestic cup winners from associations 1–12; 1 domestic league fourth-placed team from association 5; 4 domestic league fifth-placed teams from associations 1–4	8 winners from play-off round (Champions Path); 13 winners from play-off round (Main Path)	4 losers from Champions League play-off round (Champions Path); 2 losers from Champions League play-off round (League Path); 4 losers from Champions League third qualifying round (League Path)
Knockout phase (32 teams)			12 group winners from group stage; 12 group runners-up from group stage	8 third-placed teams from Champions League group stage

==== Redistribution rules ====
A Europa League place was vacated when a team qualified for both the Champions League and the Europa League, or qualified for the Europa League by more than one method. When a place was vacated, it was redistributed within the national association by the following rules:

- When the domestic cup winners (considered as the "highest-placed" qualifier within the national association with the latest starting round) also qualified for the Champions League, their Europa League place was vacated. As a result, the highest-placed team in the league which had not yet qualified for European competitions qualified for the Europa League, with the Europa League qualifiers which finished above them in the league moving up one "place".
- When the domestic cup winners also qualified for the Europa League through league position, their place through the league position was vacated. As a result, the highest-placed team in the league which had not yet qualified for European competitions qualified for the Europa League, with the Europa League qualifiers which finished above them in the league moving up one "place" if possible.
- For associations where a Europa League place was reserved for either the League Cup or end-of-season European competition play-offs winners, they always qualified for the Europa League as the "lowest-placed" qualifier. If the League Cup winners had already qualified for European competitions through other methods, this reserved Europa League place was taken by the highest-placed team in the league which had not yet qualified for European competitions.

=== Teams ===
The labels in the parentheses show how each team qualified for the place of its starting round:

- CW: Cup winners
- 2nd, 3rd, 4th, 5th, 6th, etc.: League position
- LC: League Cup winners
- RW: Regular season winners
- PW: End-of-season Europa League play-offs winners
- UCL: Transferred from the Champions League
  - GS: Third-placed teams from the group stage
  - PO: Losers from the play-off round
  - Q3: Losers from the third qualifying round
  - Q2: Losers from the second qualifying round
  - Q1: Losers from the first qualifying round
  - PR: Losers from the preliminary round (SF: semi-finals; F: final)

Qualified teams for 2018–19 UEFA Europa League (by entry round) Round of 32
(Spain) Valencia (UCL GS)	(Italy) Napoli (UCL GS)	(Ukraine) Shakhtar Donetsk (UCL GS)	(Turkey) Galatasaray (UCL GS)
(Italy) Inter Milan (UCL GS)	(Portugal) Benfica (UCL GS)	(Belgium) Club Brugge (UCL GS)	(Czech Republic) Viktoria Plzeň (UCL GS)

Group stage
(Spain) Villarreal (5th)	(Italy) AC Milan (6th)	(Turkey) Akhisarspor (CW)	(Ukraine) Dynamo Kyiv (UCL PO)
(Spain) Real Betis (6th)	(France) Marseille (4th)	(Czech Republic) Jablonec (3rd)	(Greece) PAOK (UCL PO)
(Germany) Eintracht Frankfurt (CW)	(France) Rennes (5th)	(Switzerland) Zürich (CW)	(Russia) Spartak Moscow (UCL Q3)
(Germany) Bayer Leverkusen (5th)	(Russia) Krasnodar (4th)	(Austria) Red Bull Salzburg (UCL PO)	(Belgium) Standard Liège (UCL Q3)
(England) Chelsea (CW)	(Portugal) Sporting CP (3rd)	(Croatia) Dinamo Zagreb (UCL PO)	(Turkey) Fenerbahçe (UCL Q3)
(England) Arsenal (6th)	(Ukraine) Vorskla Poltava (3rd)	(Belarus) BATE Borisov (UCL PO)	(Czech Republic) Slavia Prague (UCL Q3)
(Italy) Lazio (5th)	(Belgium) Anderlecht (3rd)	(Hungary) Vidi (UCL PO)	

Play-off round
Champions Path		Main Path
(Sweden) Malmö FF (UCL Q3)	(Kazakhstan) Astana (UCL Q3)	
(Scotland) Celtic (UCL Q3)	(Slovakia) Spartak Trnava (UCL Q3)	
(Azerbaijan) Qarabağ (UCL Q3)	(North Macedonia) Shkëndija (UCL Q3)	

Third qualifying round
Champions Path		Main Path	
(Romania) CFR Cluj (UCL Q2)	(Bulgaria) Ludogorets Razgrad (UCL Q2)	(Russia) Zenit Saint Petersburg (5th)	(Greece) Olympiacos (3rd)
(Denmark) Midtjylland (UCL Q2)	(Moldova) Sheriff Tiraspol (UCL Q2)	(Portugal) Braga (4th)	(Austria) Rapid Wien (3rd)
(Poland) Legia Warsaw (UCL Q2)	(Finland) HJK (UCL Q2)	(Ukraine) Zorya Luhansk (4th)	(Croatia) Rijeka (2nd)
(Israel) Hapoel Be'er Sheva (UCL Q2)	(Albania) Kukësi (UCL Q2)	(Belgium) Gent (4th)	(Romania) Universitatea Craiova (CW)
(Norway) Rosenborg (UCL Q2)	(Lithuania) Sūduva (UCL Q2)	(Turkey) İstanbul Başakşehir (3rd)	(Denmark) Brøndby (CW)
	(Republic of Ireland) Cork City (UCL Q1)	(Czech Republic) Sigma Olomouc (4th)	(Switzerland) Basel (UCL Q2)
		(Switzerland) Luzern (3rd)	(Austria) Sturm Graz (UCL Q2)
		(Netherlands) Feyenoord (CW)	

Second qualifying round
Champions Path		Main Path	
(Cyprus) APOEL (UCL Q1)	(Luxembourg) F91 Dudelange (UCL Q1)	(Spain) Sevilla (7th)	(Greece) Atromitos (4th)
(Slovenia) Olimpija Ljubljana (UCL Q1)	(Northern Ireland) Crusaders (UCL Q1)	(Germany) RB Leipzig (6th)	(Greece) Asteras Tripolis (5th)
(Iceland) Valur (UCL Q1)	(Malta) Valletta (UCL Q1)	(England) Burnley (7th)	(Austria) LASK (4th)
(Bosnia and Herzegovina) Zrinjski Mostar (UCL Q1)	(Wales) The New Saints (UCL Q1)	(Italy) Atalanta (7th)	(Austria) Flyeralarm Admira (5th)
(Georgia (country)) Torpedo Kutaisi (UCL Q1)	(Faroe Islands) Víkingur Gøta (UCL Q1)	(France) Bordeaux (6th)	(Croatia) Hajduk Split (3rd)
(Latvia) Spartaks Jūrmala (UCL Q1)	(Kosovo) Drita (UCL Q1)	(Russia) Ufa (6th)	(Romania) FCSB (2nd)
(Estonia) Flora (UCL Q1)	(Gibraltar) Lincoln Red Imps (UCL PR F)	(Portugal) Rio Ave (5th)	(Belarus) Dynamo Brest (CW)
(Montenegro) Sutjeska (UCL Q1)	(Andorra) FC Santa Coloma (UCL PR SF)	(Ukraine) Mariupol (5th)	(Poland) Jagiellonia Białystok (2nd)
(Armenia) Alashkert (UCL Q1)	(San Marino) La Fiorita (UCL PR SF)	(Belgium) Genk (PW)	(Sweden) Djurgårdens IF (CW)
		(Turkey) Beşiktaş (4th)	(Israel) Hapoel Haifa (CW)
		(Czech Republic) Sparta Prague (5th)	(Scotland) Aberdeen (2nd)
		(Switzerland) St. Gallen (5th)	(Cyprus) AEK Larnaca (CW)
		(Netherlands) AZ (3rd)	(Norway) Lillestrøm (CW)
		(Netherlands) Vitesse (PW)	

First qualifying round
(Croatia) Osijek (4th)	(Bulgaria) CSKA Sofia (2nd)	(Iceland) Stjarnan (2nd)	(North Macedonia) Shkupi (4th)
(Romania) Viitorul Constanța (4th)	(Bulgaria) Levski Sofia (PW)	(Iceland) FH (3rd)	(Estonia) FCI Levadia (CW)
(Denmark) Nordsjælland (3rd)	(Serbia) Partizan (CW)	(Finland) KuPS (2nd)	(Estonia) Nõmme Kalju (3rd)
(Denmark) Copenhagen (PW)	(Serbia) Radnički Niš (3rd)	(Finland) Ilves (3rd)	(Estonia) Narva Trans (5th)
(Belarus) Dinamo Minsk (2nd)	(Serbia) Spartak Subotica (4th)	(Finland) Lahti (4th)	(Montenegro) Titograd Podgorica (CW)
(Belarus) Shakhtyor Soligorsk (3rd)	(Kazakhstan) Kairat (CW)	(Albania) Luftëtari (3rd)	(Montenegro) Budućnost Podgorica (2nd)
(Poland) Lech Poznań (3rd)	(Kazakhstan) Irtysh (4th)	(Albania) Laçi (4th)	(Montenegro) Rudar Pljevlja (5th)
(Poland) Górnik Zabrze (4th)	(Kazakhstan) Tobol (5th)	(Albania) Partizani (5th)	(Armenia) Gandzasar Kapan (CW)
(Sweden) AIK (2nd)	(Slovenia) Maribor (2nd)	(Republic of Ireland) Dundalk (2nd)	(Armenia) Banants (2nd)
(Sweden) BK Häcken (4th)	(Slovenia) Domžale (3rd)	(Republic of Ireland) Shamrock Rovers (3rd)	(Armenia) Pyunik (5th)
(Israel) Maccabi Tel Aviv (2nd)	(Slovenia) Rudar Velenje (4th)	(Republic of Ireland) Derry City (4th)	(Luxembourg) Racing Union (CW)
(Israel) Beitar Jerusalem (3rd)	(Slovakia) Slovan Bratislava (CW)	(Bosnia and Herzegovina) Željezničar (CW)	(Luxembourg) Progrès Niederkorn (2nd)
(Scotland) Rangers (3rd)	(Slovakia) DAC Dunajská Streda (3rd)	(Bosnia and Herzegovina) Sarajevo (3rd)	(Luxembourg) Fola Esch (3rd)
(Scotland) Hibernian (4th)	(Slovakia) Trenčín (PW)	(Bosnia and Herzegovina) Široki Brijeg (4th)	(Northern Ireland) Coleraine (CW)
(Cyprus) Apollon Limassol (2nd)	(Liechtenstein) Vaduz (CW)	(Georgia (country)) Chikhura Sachkhere (CW)	(Northern Ireland) Glenavon (3rd)
(Cyprus) Anorthosis Famagusta (3rd)	(Hungary) Újpest (CW)	(Georgia (country)) Dinamo Tbilisi (2nd)	(Northern Ireland) Cliftonville (PW)
(Norway) Molde (2nd)	(Hungary) Ferencváros (2nd)	(Georgia (country)) Samtredia (3rd)	(Lithuania) Stumbras (CW)
(Norway) Sarpsborg 08 (3rd)	(Hungary) Honvéd (4th)	(Latvia) Liepāja (CW)	(Lithuania) Žalgiris (2nd)
(Azerbaijan) Keşla (CW)	(Moldova) Milsami Orhei (CW)	(Latvia) Riga (3rd)	(Malta) Balzan (2nd)
(Azerbaijan) Gabala (2nd)	(Moldova) Petrocub Hîncești (3rd)	(Latvia) Ventspils (4th)	(Wales) Connah's Quay Nomads (CW)
(Azerbaijan) Neftçi (3rd)	(Moldova) Zaria Bălți (5th)	(North Macedonia) Vardar (2nd)	(Faroe Islands) NSÍ (CW)
(Bulgaria) Slavia Sofia (CW)	(Iceland) ÍBV (CW)	(North Macedonia) Rabotnicki (3rd)	

Preliminary round
(Lithuania) Trakai (3rd)	(Wales) Cefn Druids (PW)	(Gibraltar) St Joseph's (3rd)	(San Marino) Tre Fiori (3rd)
(Malta) Gżira United (3rd)	(Faroe Islands) KÍ (2nd)	(Andorra) Engordany (2nd)	(Kosovo) Prishtina (CW)
(Malta) Birkirkara (4th)	(Faroe Islands) B36 (3rd)	(Andorra) Sant Julià (3rd)	
(Wales) Bala Town (4th)	(Gibraltar) Europa (CW)	(San Marino) Folgore (2nd)	

Notably one team that was not playing a national top division took part in the competition; Vaduz (representing Liechtenstein) played in 2017–18 Swiss Challenge League, which is Switzerland's second tier.

Notes

1. Albania (ALB): In March 2018, Skënderbeu was handed a 10-year ban from UEFA club competitions over match fixing. Since they finished as champions of the 2017–18 Albanian Superliga, the runners-up of the league, Kukësi, entered the 2018–19 UEFA Champions League instead of the 2018–19 UEFA Europa League. As a result, their Europa League first qualifying round berth was given to the fifth-placed team of the league, Partizani.
2. Armenia (ARM): Shirak would have qualified for the Europa League first qualifying round as the fourth-placed team of the 2017–18 Armenian Premier League, but were penalized by the Football Federation of Armenia for match fixing, and subsequently informed UEFA their withdrawal from competing in the Europa League. As a result, the berth was given to the fifth-placed team of the league, Pyunik.
3. Estonia (EST): FCI Tallinn would have qualified for the Europa League first qualifying round as the fourth-placed team of the 2017 Meistriliiga, but were disbanded and merged with Levadia Tallinn after the season. As a result, the berth was given to the fifth-placed team of the league, Narva Trans.
4. Italy (ITA): AC Milan qualified for the Europa League group stage as the sixth-placed team of the 2017–18 Serie A, but were originally banned by UEFA from European competition due to violations of Financial Fair Play regulations. They appealed to the Court of Arbitration for Sport, and the ban was overturned on 20 July 2018.
5. Kazakhstan (KAZ): Ordabasy would have qualified for the Europa League first qualifying round as the third-placed team of the 2017 Kazakhstan Premier League, but failed to obtain a UEFA licence. As a result, the berth was given to the fifth-placed team of the league, Tobol.
6. Moldova (MDA): Dacia Chișinău would have qualified for the Europa League first qualifying round as the fourth-placed team of the 2017 Moldovan National Division, but were disbanded after the season. As a result, the berth was given to the fifth-placed team of the league, Zaria Bălți.
7. Montenegro (MNE): Grbalj would have qualified for the Europa League first qualifying round as the fourth-placed team of the 2017–18 Montenegrin First League, but failed to obtain a UEFA licence. As a result, the berth was given to the fifth-placed team of the league, Rudar Pljevlja.
8. Portugal (POR): Desportivo das Aves would have qualified for the Europa League group stage as the winners of the 2017–18 Taça de Portugal, but failed to obtain a UEFA licence. As a result, the third-placed team of the 2017–18 Primeira Liga, Sporting CP, entered the group stage instead of the third qualifying round, the fourth-placed team of the league, Braga, entered the third qualifying round instead of the second qualifying round, and the second qualifying round berth was given to the fifth-placed team of the league, Rio Ave.
9. Republic of Ireland (IRL): Derry City are a club based in Northern Ireland, but participate in the Europa League through one of the berths for the Republic of Ireland (any coefficient points they earn count toward Republic of Ireland and not Northern Ireland).
10. Russia (RUS): Tosno would have qualified for the Europa League group stage as the winners of the 2017–18 Russian Cup, but failed to obtain a UEFA licence. As a result, the fourth-placed team of the 2017–18 Russian Premier League, Krasnodar, entered the group stage instead of the third qualifying round, the fifth-placed team of the league, Zenit Saint Petersburg, entered the third qualifying round instead of the second qualifying round, and the second qualifying round berth was given to the sixth-placed team of the league, Ufa.
11. Wales (WAL): Bangor City would have qualified for the Europa League preliminary round as the runners-up of the 2017–18 Welsh Premier League, but failed to obtain a UEFA licence. As a result, and because the third-placed team Connah's Quay Nomads were Welsh Cup winners, the berth was given to the fourth-placed team of the league, Bala Town.
12. Champions League (UCL Q1): Cork City were drawn from the first qualifying round losers to receive a bye to the third qualifying round, as one fewer loser from the Champions League first qualifying round were transferred to the Europa League second qualifying round (Champions Path), due to a Champions League group stage berth vacated by the Champions League title holders.

== Round and draw dates ==
The schedule of the competition was as follows (all draws were held at the UEFA headquarters in Nyon, Switzerland, unless stated otherwise).

Schedule for 2018–19 UEFA Europa League
Phase	Round	Draw date	First leg	Second leg
Qualifying	Preliminary round	12 June 2018	28 June 2018	5 July 2018
Qualifying	First qualifying round	19 June 2018 (Champions Path); 20 June 2018 (Main Path)	12 July 2018	19 July 2018
Qualifying	Second qualifying round	19 June 2018 (Champions Path); 20 June 2018 (Main Path)	26 July 2018	2 August 2018
Qualifying	Third qualifying round	23 July 2018	9 August 2018	16 August 2018
Play-off	Play-off round	6 August 2018	23 August 2018	30 August 2018
Group stage	Matchday 1	31 August 2018 (Monaco)	20 September 2018	
Group stage	Matchday 2	31 August 2018 (Monaco)	4 October 2018	
Group stage	Matchday 3	31 August 2018 (Monaco)	25 October 2018	
Group stage	Matchday 4	31 August 2018 (Monaco)	8 November 2018	
Group stage	Matchday 5	31 August 2018 (Monaco)	29 November 2018	
Group stage	Matchday 6	31 August 2018 (Monaco)	13 December 2018	
Knockout phase	Round of 32	17 December 2018	14 February 2019	21 February 2019
Knockout phase	Round of 16	22 February 2019	7 March 2019	14 March 2019
Knockout phase	Quarter-finals	15 March 2019	11 April 2019	18 April 2019
Knockout phase	Semi-finals	15 March 2019	2 May 2019	9 May 2019
Knockout phase	Final	15 March 2019	29 May 2019 at Olympic Stadium, Baku	

Matches in the qualifying (including preliminary and play-off) and knockout rounds could also be played on Tuesdays or Wednesdays instead of the regular Thursdays due to scheduling conflicts.

From this season, the kick-off times starting from the group stage were slightly changed to 18:55 CET and 21:00 CET. Kick-off times starting from the quarter-finals were 21:00 CEST.

== Qualifying rounds ==
In the qualifying and play-off rounds, teams were divided into seeded and unseeded teams based on their 2018 UEFA club coefficients (for Main Path), or based on which round they qualified from (for Champions Path), and then drawn into two-legged home-and-away ties.

=== Preliminary round ===
In the preliminary round, teams were divided into seeded and unseeded teams based on their 2018 UEFA club coefficients, and then drawn into two-legged home-and-away ties. Teams from the same association could not be drawn against each other. The draw for the preliminary round was held on 12 June 2018. The first legs were played on 26 and 28 June, and the second legs on 5 July 2018.

Team 1	Agg.	Team 2	1st leg	2nd leg
Europa (Gibraltar)	1–6	(Kosovo) Prishtina	1–1	0–5
Sant Julià (Andorra)	1–4	(Malta) Gżira United	0–2	1–2
Engordany (Andorra)	3–2	(San Marino) Folgore	2–1	1–1
B36 (Faroe Islands)	2–2 (4–2 p)	(Gibraltar) St Joseph's	1–1	1–1 (a.e.t.)
Birkirkara (Malta)	2–3	(Faroe Islands) KÍ	1–1	1–2
Tre Fiori (San Marino)	3–1	(Wales) Bala Town	3–0	0–1
Cefn Druids (Wales)	1–2	(Lithuania) Trakai	1–1	0–1

=== First qualifying round ===
The draw for the first qualifying round was held on 20 June 2018. The first legs were played on 10, 11 and 12 July, and the second legs on 17, 18 and 19 July 2018.

Team 1	Agg.	Team 2	1st leg	2nd leg
Stjarnan (Iceland)	3–1	(Estonia) Nõmme Kalju	3–0	0–1
Ilves (Finland)	1–3	(Bulgaria) Slavia Sofia	0–1	1–2
KÍ (Faroe Islands)	2–3	(Lithuania) Žalgiris	1–2	1–1
Fola Esch (Luxembourg)	0–0 (5–4 p)	(Kosovo) Prishtina	0–0	0–0 (a.e.t.)
Glenavon (Northern Ireland)	3–6	(Norway) Molde	2–1	1–5
DAC Dunajská Streda (Slovakia)	3–2	(Georgia (country)) Dinamo Tbilisi	1–1	2–1
Stumbras (Lithuania)	1–2	(Cyprus) Apollon Limassol	1–0	0–2
Široki Brijeg (Bosnia and Herzegovina)	3–3 (a)	(Slovenia) Domžale	2–2	1–1
Rangers (Scotland)	2–0	(North Macedonia) Shkupi	2–0	0–0
Gabala (Azerbaijan)	1–2 (Note: Order of legs reversed after original draw.)	(Luxembourg) Progrès Niederkorn	0–2	1–0
Racing Union (Luxembourg)	0–2	(Romania) Viitorul Constanța	0–2	0–0
Samtredia (Georgia (country))	0–3	(Kazakhstan) Tobol	0–1	0–2
Partizani (Albania)	0–3	(Slovenia) Maribor	0–1	0–2
Neftçi (Azerbaijan)	3–5	(Hungary) Újpest	3–1	0–4
Budućnost Podgorica (Montenegro)	1–3	(Slovakia) Trenčín	0–2	1–1
Derry City (Republic of Ireland)	2–3	(Belarus) Dinamo Minsk	0–2	2–1
B36 (Faroe Islands)	2–1	(Montenegro) Titograd Podgorica	0–0	2–1
Górnik Zabrze (Poland)	2–1	(Moldova) Zaria Bălți	1–0	1–1
Spartak Subotica (Serbia)	3–1	(Northern Ireland) Coleraine	1–1	2–0
Pyunik (Armenia)	3–0	(North Macedonia) Vardar	1–0	2–0
Shamrock Rovers (Republic of Ireland)	1–2	(Sweden) AIK	0–1	1–1 (a.e.t.)
Connah's Quay Nomads (Wales)	1–5	(Belarus) Shakhtyor Soligorsk	1–3	0–2
Lahti (Finland)	0–3	(Iceland) FH	0–3	0–0
Ventspils (Latvia)	8–3	(Albania) Luftëtari	5–0	3–3
Cliftonville (Northern Ireland)	1–3	(Denmark) Nordsjælland	0–1	1–2
Banants (Armenia)	1–5	(Bosnia and Herzegovina) Sarajevo	1–2	0–3
Engordany (Andorra)	1–10	(Kazakhstan) Kairat	0–3	1–7
Petrocub Hîncești (Moldova)	2–3	(Croatia) Osijek	1–1	1–2
Anorthosis Famagusta (Cyprus)	2–2 (a)	(Albania) Laçi	2–1	0–1
Ferencváros (Hungary)	1–2	(Israel) Maccabi Tel Aviv	1–1	0–1
Balzan (Malta)	5–3	(Azerbaijan) Keşla	4–1	1–2
Rabotnicki (North Macedonia)	2–5	(Hungary) Honvéd	2–1	0–4
Rudar Pljevlja (Montenegro)	0–6	(Serbia) Partizan	0–3	0–3
CSKA Sofia (Bulgaria)	1–1 (5–3 p)	(Latvia) Riga	1–0	0–1 (a.e.t.)
Milsami Orhei (Moldova)	2–9	(Slovakia) Slovan Bratislava	2–4	0–5
Radnički Niš (Serbia)	5–0	(Malta) Gżira United	4–0	1–0
Lech Poznań (Poland)	3–2	(Armenia) Gandzasar Kapan	2–0	1–2
Chikhura Sachkhere (Georgia (country))	2–1	(Israel) Beitar Jerusalem	0–0	2–1
Vaduz (Liechtenstein)	3–3 (a)	(Bulgaria) Levski Sofia	1–0	2–3
Narva Trans (Estonia)	1–5	(Bosnia and Herzegovina) Željezničar	0–2	1–3
Trakai (Lithuania)	1–0	(Kazakhstan) Irtysh	0–0	1–0
Hibernian (Scotland)	12–5	(Faroe Islands) NSÍ	6–1	6–4
Rudar Velenje (Slovenia)	10–0	(San Marino) Tre Fiori	7–0	3–0
FCI Levadia (Estonia)	1–3	(Republic of Ireland) Dundalk	0–1	1–2
ÍBV (Iceland)	0–6	(Norway) Sarpsborg 08	0–4	0–2
KuPS (Finland)	1–2	(Denmark) Copenhagen	0–1	1–1
Liepāja (Latvia)	2–4	(Sweden) BK Häcken	0–3	2–1

=== Second qualifying round ===
The second qualifying round was split into two separate sections: Champions Path (for league champions) and Main Path (for cup winners and league non-champions). The draw for the second qualifying round (Champions Path) was held on 19 June, and the draw for the second qualifying round (Main Path) was held on 20 June 2018. The first legs were played on 26 July, and the second legs on 31 July, 1 and 2 August 2018.

Team 1	Agg.	Team 2	1st leg	2nd leg
Champions Path
Cork City (Republic of Ireland)	Bye	N/A	—	—
The New Saints (Wales)	3–2	(Gibraltar) Lincoln Red Imps	2–1	1–1
Torpedo Kutaisi (Georgia (country))	7–0	(Faroe Islands) Víkingur Gøta	3–0	4–0
Zrinjski Mostar (Bosnia and Herzegovina)	3–2	(Malta) Valletta	1–1	2–1
FC Santa Coloma (Andorra)	1–3	(Iceland) Valur	1–0	0–3
Sutjeska (Montenegro)	0–1	(Armenia) Alashkert	0–1	0–0
F91 Dudelange (Luxembourg)	3–2	(Kosovo) Drita	2–1	1–1
Spartaks Jūrmala (Latvia)	9–0	(San Marino) La Fiorita	6–0	3–0
APOEL (Cyprus)	5–2	(Estonia) Flora	5–0	0–2
Olimpija Ljubljana (Slovenia)	6–2	(Northern Ireland) Crusaders	5–1	1–1
Main Path
Molde (Norway)	5–0	(Albania) Laçi	3–0	2–0
Atalanta (Italy)	10–2 (Note: Order of legs reversed after original draw.)	(Bosnia and Herzegovina) Sarajevo	2–2	8–0
Žalgiris (Lithuania)	2–1	(Liechtenstein) Vaduz	1–0	1–1
Kairat (Kazakhstan)	3–2	(Netherlands) AZ	2–0	1–2
Aberdeen (Scotland)	2–4	(England) Burnley	1–1	1–3 (a.e.t.)
Partizan (Serbia)	2–1	(Lithuania) Trakai	1–0	1–1
Balzan (Malta)	3–4	(Slovakia) Slovan Bratislava	2–1	1–3
Nordsjælland (Denmark)	2–0	(Sweden) AIK	1–0	1–0
Rudar Velenje (Slovenia)	0–6	(Romania) FCSB	0–2	0–4
Hapoel Haifa (Israel)	2–1	(Iceland) FH	1–1	1–0
Dundalk (Republic of Ireland)	0–4	(Cyprus) AEK Larnaca	0–0	0–4
Górnik Zabrze (Poland)	1–5	(Slovakia) Trenčín	0–1	1–4
Maccabi Tel Aviv (Israel)	4–2	(Serbia) Radnički Niš	2–0	2–2
CSKA Sofia (Bulgaria)	6–1	(Austria) Flyeralarm Admira	3–0	3–1
Spartak Subotica (Serbia)	3–2	(Czech Republic) Sparta Prague	2–0	1–2
RB Leipzig (Germany)	5–1	(Sweden) BK Häcken	4–0	1–1
Stjarnan (Iceland)	0–7	(Denmark) Copenhagen	0–2	0–5
Ufa (Russia)	1–1 (a)	(Slovenia) Domžale	0–0	1–1
Tobol (Kazakhstan)	2–2 (a)	(Armenia) Pyunik	2–1	0–1
Jagiellonia Białystok (Poland)	5–4	(Portugal) Rio Ave	1–0	4–4
LASK (Austria)	6–1	(Norway) Lillestrøm	4–0	2–1
Honvéd (Hungary)	1–2	(Luxembourg) Progrès Niederkorn	1–0	0–2
Osijek (Croatia)	1–2	(Scotland) Rangers	0–1	1–1
B36 (Faroe Islands)	0–8	(Turkey) Beşiktaş	0–2	0–6
DAC Dunajská Streda (Slovakia)	2–7	(Belarus) Dinamo Minsk	1–3	1–4
Ventspils (Latvia)	1–3	(France) Bordeaux	0–1	1–2
Željezničar (Bosnia and Herzegovina)	2–5	(Cyprus) Apollon Limassol	1–2	1–3
Viitorul Constanța (Romania)	3–5	(Netherlands) Vitesse	2–2	1–3
St. Gallen (Switzerland)	2–2 (a)	(Norway) Sarpsborg 08	2–1	0–1
Dynamo Brest (Belarus)	5–4	(Greece) Atromitos	4–3	1–1
Sevilla (Spain)	7–1	(Hungary) Újpest	4–0	3–1
Shakhtyor Soligorsk (Belarus)	2–4	(Poland) Lech Poznań	1–1	1–3 (a.e.t.)
Hibernian (Scotland)	4–3	(Greece) Asteras Tripolis	3–2	1–1
Chikhura Sachkhere (Georgia (country))	0–2	(Slovenia) Maribor	0–0	0–2
Genk (Belgium)	9–1	(Luxembourg) Fola Esch	5–0	4–1
Djurgårdens IF (Sweden)	2–3	(Ukraine) Mariupol	1–1	1–2 (a.e.t.)
Hajduk Split (Croatia)	4–2	(Bulgaria) Slavia Sofia	1–0	3–2

=== Third qualifying round ===
The third qualifying round was split into two separate sections: Champions Path (for league champions) and Main Path (for cup winners and league non-champions). The draw for the third qualifying round was held on 23 July 2018. The first legs were played on 7 and 9 August, and the second legs on 16 August 2018.

Team 1	Agg.	Team 2	1st leg	2nd leg
Champions Path
Ludogorets Razgrad (Bulgaria)	2–1	(Bosnia and Herzegovina) Zrinjski Mostar	1–0	1–1
Legia Warsaw (Poland)	3–4	(Luxembourg) F91 Dudelange	1–2	2–2
Alashkert (Armenia)	0–7	(Romania) CFR Cluj	0–2	0–5
Olimpija Ljubljana (Slovenia)	7–1	(Finland) HJK	3–0	4–1
Sheriff Tiraspol (Moldova)	2–2 (a)	(Iceland) Valur	1–0	1–2
Cork City (Republic of Ireland)	0–5	(Norway) Rosenborg	0–2	0–3
Spartaks Jūrmala (Latvia)	0–1	(Lithuania) Sūduva	0–1	0–0
The New Saints (Wales)	1–5	(Denmark) Midtjylland	0–2	1–3
Hapoel Be'er Sheva (Israel)	3–5	(Cyprus) APOEL	2–2	1–3
Torpedo Kutaisi (Georgia (country))	5–4	(Albania) Kukësi	5–2	0–2
Main Path
Pyunik (Armenia)	1–2	(Israel) Maccabi Tel Aviv	0–0	1–2
Dinamo Minsk (Belarus)	5–8	(Russia) Zenit Saint Petersburg	4–0	1–8 (a.e.t.)
Sturm Graz (Austria)	0–7	(Cyprus) AEK Larnaca	0–2	0–5
Sarpsborg 08 (Norway)	2–1	(Croatia) Rijeka	1–1	1–0
İstanbul Başakşehir (Turkey)	0–1	(England) Burnley	0–0	0–1 (a.e.t.)
Zorya Luhansk (Ukraine)	3–3 (a)	(Portugal) Braga	1–1	2–2
Hapoel Haifa (Israel)	1–6	(Italy) Atalanta	1–4	0–2
Genk (Belgium)	4–1	(Poland) Lech Poznań	2–0	2–1
Vitesse (Netherlands)	0–2	(Switzerland) Basel	0–1	0–1
Nordsjælland (Denmark)	3–5	(Serbia) Partizan	1–2	2–3
Hibernian (Scotland)	0–3	(Norway) Molde	0–0	0–3
Hajduk Split (Croatia)	1–2	(Romania) FCSB	0–0	1–2
Sevilla (Spain)	6–0	(Lithuania) Žalgiris	1–0	5–0
Sigma Olomouc (Czech Republic)	4–1	(Kazakhstan) Kairat	2–0	2–1
Slovan Bratislava (Slovakia)	2–5	(Austria) Rapid Wien	2–1	0–4
Mariupol (Ukraine)	2–5	(France) Bordeaux	1–3	1–2
CSKA Sofia (Bulgaria)	2–4	(Denmark) Copenhagen	1–2	1–2
Olympiacos (Greece)	7–1	(Switzerland) Luzern	4–0	3–1
Rangers (Scotland)	3–1	(Slovenia) Maribor	3–1	0–0
Trenčín (Slovakia)	5–1	(Netherlands) Feyenoord	4–0	1–1
Jagiellonia Białystok (Poland)	1–4	(Belgium) Gent	0–1	1–3
Spartak Subotica (Serbia)	1–4	(Denmark) Brøndby	0–2	1–2
Ufa (Russia)	4–3	(Luxembourg) Progrès Niederkorn	2–1	2–2
Beşiktaş (Turkey)	2–2 (a)	(Austria) LASK	1–0	1–2
Apollon Limassol (Cyprus)	4–1	(Belarus) Dynamo Brest	4–0	0–1
RB Leipzig (Germany)	4–2	(Romania) Universitatea Craiova	3–1	1–1

== Play-off round ==
The play-off round was split into two separate sections: Champions Path (for league champions) and Main Path (for cup winners and league non-champions). The draw for the play-off round was held on 6 August 2018. The first legs were played on 23 August, and the second legs on 30 August 2018.

Team 1	Agg.	Team 2	1st leg	2nd leg
Champions Path
Olimpija Ljubljana (Slovenia)	1–3	(Slovakia) Spartak Trnava	0–2	1–1
APOEL (Cyprus)	1–1 (1–2 p)	(Kazakhstan) Astana	1–0	0–1 (a.e.t.)
Rosenborg (Norway)	5–1	(North Macedonia) Shkëndija	3–1	2–0
F91 Dudelange (Luxembourg)	5–2	(Romania) CFR Cluj	2–0	3–2
Sūduva (Lithuania)	1–4	(Scotland) Celtic	1–1	0–3
Sheriff Tiraspol (Moldova)	1–3	(Azerbaijan) Qarabağ	1–0	0–3
Malmö FF (Sweden)	4–2	(Denmark) Midtjylland	2–2	2–0
Torpedo Kutaisi (Georgia (country))	0–5	(Bulgaria) Ludogorets Razgrad	0–1	0–4
Main Path
Sigma Olomouc (Czech Republic)	0–4	(Spain) Sevilla	0–1	0–3
Sarpsborg 08 (Norway)	4–3	(Israel) Maccabi Tel Aviv	3–1	1–2
Gent (Belgium)	0–2	(France) Bordeaux	0–0	0–2
Partizan (Serbia)	1–4	(Turkey) Beşiktaş	1–1	0–3
Rapid Wien (Austria)	4–3	(Romania) FCSB	3–1	1–2
Basel (Switzerland)	3–3 (a) (Note: Order of legs reversed after original draw.)	(Cyprus) Apollon Limassol	3–2	0–1
Rangers (Scotland)	2–1	(Russia) Ufa	1–0	1–1
Atalanta (Italy)	0–0 (3–4 p)	(Denmark) Copenhagen	0–0	0–0 (a.e.t.)
Zenit Saint Petersburg (Russia)	4–3	(Norway) Molde	3–1	1–2
Trenčín (Slovakia)	1–4	(Cyprus) AEK Larnaca	1–1	0–3
Genk (Belgium)	9–4	(Denmark) Brøndby	5–2	4–2
Olympiacos (Greece)	4–2	(England) Burnley	3–1	1–1
Zorya Luhansk (Ukraine)	2–3	(Germany) RB Leipzig	0–0	2–3

== Group stage ==
Location of teams of the 2018–19 UEFA Europa League group stage.
Brown: Group A; Green: Group B; Deep Pink: Group C; Yellow: Group D;
Red: Group E; Cyan: Group F; Blue: Group G; Purple: Group H;
Pink: Group I; Turquoise: Group J; Spring Green: Group K; Orange: Group L.

The draw for the group stage was held on 31 August 2018 at the Grimaldi Forum in Monaco. The 48 teams were drawn into twelve groups of four, with the restriction that teams from the same association cannot be drawn against each other. For the draw, the teams are seeded into four pots based on their 2018 UEFA club coefficients.

In each group, teams played against each other home-and-away in a round-robin format. The group winners and runners-up advance to the round of 32 where they are joined by the eight third-placed teams of the 2018–19 UEFA Champions League group stage. The matchdays are 20 September, 4 October, 25 October, 8 November, 29 November, and 13 December 2018.

A total of 27 national associations were represented in the group stage. Akhisarspor, Chelsea, F91 Dudelange, Jablonec, Rangers, RB Leipzig, Sarpsborg 08, Spartak Moscow and Spartak Trnava made their debut appearances in the UEFA Europa League group stage (although Chelsea, Rangers, RB Leipzig and Spartak Moscow had already competed in the UEFA Europa League knockout phase after a third place in the UEFA Champions League group stage, while Rangers and Spartak Moscow had appeared in the UEFA Cup group stage). Furthermore, Akhisarspor and Sarpsborg 08 and F91 Dudelange made their debuts in any European football group stage and F91 Dudelange were the first team from Luxembourg to play in either the Champions League or Europa League group stage.

Tiebreakers

Teams were ranked according to points (3 points for a win, 1 point for a draw, 0 points for a loss), and if tied on points, the following tiebreaking criteria were applied, in the order given, to determine the rankings (Regulations Articles 16.01):

1. Points in head-to-head matches among tied teams;
2. Goal difference in head-to-head matches among tied teams;
3. Goals scored in head-to-head matches among tied teams;
4. Away goals scored in head-to-head matches among tied teams;
5. If more than two teams were tied, and after applying all head-to-head criteria above, a subset of teams were still tied, all head-to-head criteria above were reapplied exclusively to this subset of teams;
6. Goal difference in all group matches;
7. Goals scored in all group matches;
8. Away goals scored in all group matches;
9. Wins in all group matches;
10. Away wins in all group matches;
11. Disciplinary points (red card = 3 points, yellow card = 1 point, expulsion for two yellow cards in one match = 3 points);
12. UEFA club coefficient.

=== Group A ===
Pos	Team	Pld	W	D	L	GF	GA	GD	Pts	Qualification	LEV	ZUR	AKL	LUD
1	(Germany) Bayer Leverkusen	6	4	1	1	16	9	+7	13	Advance to knockout phase	—	1–0	4–2	1–1
2	(Switzerland) Zürich	6	3	1	2	7	6	+1	10	Advance to knockout phase	3–2	—	1–2	1–0
3	(Cyprus) AEK Larnaca	6	1	2	3	6	12	−6	5		1–5	0–1	—	1–1
4	(Bulgaria) Ludogorets Razgrad	6	0	4	2	5	7	−2	4		2–3	1–1	0–0	—

Source: UEFA

=== Group B ===
Pos	Team	Pld	W	D	L	GF	GA	GD	Pts	Qualification	SAL	CEL	RBL	ROS
1	(Austria) Red Bull Salzburg	6	6	0	0	17	6	+11	18	Advance to knockout phase	—	3–1	1–0	3–0
2	(Scotland) Celtic	6	3	0	3	6	8	−2	9	Advance to knockout phase	1–2	—	2–1	1–0
3	(Germany) RB Leipzig	6	2	1	3	9	8	+1	7		2–3	2–0	—	1–1
4	(Norway) Rosenborg	6	0	1	5	4	14	−10	1		2–5	0–1	1–3	—

Source: UEFA

=== Group C ===
Pos	Team	Pld	W	D	L	GF	GA	GD	Pts	Qualification	ZEN	SLP	BOR	KOB
1	(Russia) Zenit Saint Petersburg	6	3	2	1	6	5	+1	11	Advance to knockout phase	—	1–0	2–1	1–0
2	(Czech Republic) Slavia Prague	6	3	1	2	4	3	+1	10	Advance to knockout phase	2–0	—	1–0	0–0
3	(France) Bordeaux	6	2	1	3	6	6	0	7		1–1	2–0	—	1–2
4	(Denmark) Copenhagen	6	1	2	3	3	5	−2	5		1–1	0–1	0–1	—

Source: UEFA

=== Group D ===
Pos	Team	Pld	W	D	L	GF	GA	GD	Pts	Qualification	DZG	FEN	SPT	AND
1	(Croatia) Dinamo Zagreb	6	4	2	0	11	3	+8	14	Advance to knockout phase	—	4–1	3–1	0–0
2	(Turkey) Fenerbahçe	6	2	2	2	7	7	0	8	Advance to knockout phase	0–0	—	2–0	2–0
3	(Slovakia) Spartak Trnava	6	2	1	3	4	7	−3	7		1–2	1–0	—	1–0
4	(Belgium) Anderlecht	6	0	3	3	2	7	−5	3		0–2	2–2	0–0	—

Source: UEFA

=== Group E ===
Pos	Team	Pld	W	D	L	GF	GA	GD	Pts	Qualification	ARS	SPO	VOR	QRB
1	(England) Arsenal	6	5	1	0	12	2	+10	16	Advance to knockout phase	—	0–0	4–2	1–0
2	(Portugal) Sporting CP	6	4	1	1	13	3	+10	13	Advance to knockout phase	0–1	—	3–0	2–0
3	(Ukraine) Vorskla Poltava	6	1	0	5	4	13	−9	3 (Note: Goal difference in all group matches: Vorskla Poltava –9, Qarabağ –11.)		0–3	1–2	—	0–1
4	(Azerbaijan) Qarabağ	6	1	0	5	2	13	−11	3		0–3	1–6	0–1	—

Source: UEFA

=== Group F ===
Pos	Team	Pld	W	D	L	GF	GA	GD	Pts	Qualification	BET	OLY	MIL	DUD
1	(Spain) Real Betis	6	3	3	0	7	2	+5	12	Advance to knockout phase	—	1–0	1–1	3–0
2	(Greece) Olympiacos	6	3	1	2	11	6	+5	10 (Note: Goal difference in all group matches: Olympiacos +5, Milan +3.)	Advance to knockout phase	0–0	—	3–1	5–1
3	(Italy) Milan	6	3	1	2	12	9	+3	10		1–2	3–1	—	5–2
4	(Luxembourg) F91 Dudelange	6	0	1	5	3	16	−13	1		0–0	0–2	0–1	—

Source: UEFA

=== Group G ===
Pos	Team	Pld	W	D	L	GF	GA	GD	Pts	Qualification	VIL	RW	RAN	SPM
1	(Spain) Villarreal	6	2	4	0	12	5	+7	10 (Note: Head-to-head points: Villarreal 4, Rapid Wien 1.)	Advance to knockout phase	—	5–0	2–2	2–0
2	(Austria) Rapid Wien	6	3	1	2	6	9	−3	10	Advance to knockout phase	0–0	—	1–0	2–0
3	(Scotland) Rangers	6	1	3	2	8	8	0	6		0–0	3–1	—	0–0
4	(Russia) Spartak Moscow	6	1	2	3	8	12	−4	5		3–3	1–2	4–3	—

Source: UEFA

=== Group H ===
Pos	Team	Pld	W	D	L	GF	GA	GD	Pts	Qualification	FRA	LAZ	APL	MAR
1	(Germany) Eintracht Frankfurt	6	6	0	0	17	5	+12	18	Advance to knockout phase	—	4–1	2–0	4–0
2	(Italy) Lazio	6	3	0	3	9	11	−2	9	Advance to knockout phase	1–2	—	2–1	2–1
3	(Cyprus) Apollon Limassol	6	2	1	3	10	10	0	7		2–3	2–0	—	2–2
4	(France) Marseille	6	0	1	5	6	16	−10	1		1–2	1–3	1–3	—

Source: UEFA

=== Group I ===
Pos	Team	Pld	W	D	L	GF	GA	GD	Pts	Qualification	GNK	MAL	BES	SRP
1	(Belgium) Genk	6	3	2	1	14	8	+6	11	Advance to knockout phase	—	2–0	1–1	4–0
2	(Sweden) Malmö FF	6	2	3	1	7	6	+1	9	Advance to knockout phase	2–2	—	2–0	1–1
3	(Turkey) Beşiktaş	6	2	1	3	9	11	−2	7		2–4	0–1	—	3–1
4	(Norway) Sarpsborg 08	6	1	2	3	8	13	−5	5		3–1	1–1	2–3	—

Source: UEFA

=== Group J ===
Pos	Team	Pld	W	D	L	GF	GA	GD	Pts	Qualification	SEV	KRA	STL	AKH
1	(Spain) Sevilla	6	4	0	2	18	6	+12	12 (Note: Head-to-head goal difference: Sevilla +2, Krasnodar –2.)	Advance to knockout phase	—	3–0	5–1	6–0
2	(Russia) Krasnodar	6	4	0	2	8	8	0	12	Advance to knockout phase	2–1	—	2–1	2–1
3	(Belgium) Standard Liège	6	3	1	2	7	9	−2	10		1–0	2–1	—	2–1
4	(Turkey) Akhisarspor	6	0	1	5	4	14	−10	1		2–3	0–1	0–0	—

Source: UEFA

=== Group K ===
Pos	Team	Pld	W	D	L	GF	GA	GD	Pts	Qualification	DKV	REN	AST	JAB
1	(Ukraine) Dynamo Kyiv	6	3	2	1	10	7	+3	11	Advance to knockout phase	—	3–1	2–2	0–1
2	(France) Rennes	6	3	0	3	7	8	−1	9	Advance to knockout phase	1–2	—	2–0	2–1
3	(Kazakhstan) Astana	6	2	2	2	7	7	0	8		0–1	2–0	—	2–1
4	(Czech Republic) Jablonec	6	1	2	3	6	8	−2	5		2–2	0–1	1–1	—

Source: UEFA

=== Group L ===
Pos	Team	Pld	W	D	L	GF	GA	GD	Pts	Qualification	CHL	BATE	VID	PAOK
1	(England) Chelsea	6	5	1	0	12	3	+9	16	Advance to knockout phase	—	3–1	1–0	4–0
2	(Belarus) BATE Borisov	6	3	0	3	9	9	0	9	Advance to knockout phase	0–1	—	2–0	1–4
3	(Hungary) Vidi	6	2	1	3	5	7	−2	7		2–2	0–2	—	1–0
4	(Greece) PAOK	6	1	0	5	5	12	−7	3		0–1	1–3	0–2	—

Source: UEFA

== Knockout phase ==
In the knockout phase, teams played against each other over two legs on a home-and-away basis, except for the one-match final. The mechanism of the draws for each round was as follows:

- In the draw for the round of 32, the twelve group winners and the four third-placed teams from the Champions League group stage with the better group records were seeded, and the twelve group runners-up and the other four third-placed teams from the Champions League group stage were unseeded. The seeded teams were drawn against the unseeded teams, with the seeded teams hosting the second leg. Teams from the same group or the same association could not be drawn against each other.
- In the draws for the round of 16, quarter-finals, and semi-finals, there were no seedings, and teams from the same group or the same association could be drawn against each other. As the draws for the quarter-finals and semi-finals were held together before the quarter-finals were played, the identity of the quarter-final winners was not known at the time of the semi-final draw. A draw was also held to determine which semi-final winner was designated as the "home" team for the final (for administrative purposes as it was played at a neutral venue).

=== Bracket ===
Round of 32
(Czech Republic) Viktoria Plzeň	2	0	2
(Croatia) Dinamo Zagreb	1	3	4
(Turkey) Galatasaray	1	0	1
(Portugal) Benfica	2	0	2
(Ukraine) Shakhtar Donetsk	2	1	3
(Germany) Eintracht Frankfurt	2	4	6
(Austria) Rapid Wien	0	0	0
(Italy) Inter Milan	1	4	5
(Italy) Lazio	0	0	0
(Spain) Sevilla	1	2	3
(Czech Republic) Slavia Prague	0	4	4
(Belgium) Genk	0	1	1
(Sweden) Malmö FF	1	0	1
(England) Chelsea	2	3	5
(Greece) Olympiacos	2	0	2
(Ukraine) Dynamo Kyiv	2	1	3
(France) Rennes	3	3	6
(Spain) Real Betis	3	1	4
(Belarus) BATE Borisov	1	0	1
(England) Arsenal	0	3	3
(Switzerland) Zürich	1	0	1
(Italy) Napoli	3	2	5
(Belgium) Club Brugge	2	0	2
(Austria) Red Bull Salzburg	1	4	5
(Turkey) Fenerbahçe	1	1	2
(Russia) Zenit Saint Petersburg	0	3	3
(Portugal) Sporting CP	0	1	1
(Spain) Villarreal	1	1	2
(Scotland) Celtic	0	0	0
(Spain) Valencia	2	1	3
(Russia) Krasnodar (a)	0	1	1
(Germany) Bayer Leverkusen	0	1	1

Round of 16
(Croatia) Dinamo Zagreb	1	0	1
(Portugal) Benfica (a.e.t.)	0	3	3
(Germany) Eintracht Frankfurt	0	1	1
(Italy) Inter Milan	0	0	0
(Spain) Sevilla	2	3	5
(Czech Republic) Slavia Prague (a.e.t.)	2	4	6
(England) Chelsea	3	5	8
(Ukraine) Dynamo Kyiv	0	0	0
(France) Rennes	3	0	3
(England) Arsenal	1	3	4
(Italy) Napoli	3	1	4
(Austria) Red Bull Salzburg	0	3	3
(Russia) Zenit Saint Petersburg	1	1	2
(Spain) Villarreal	3	2	5
(Spain) Valencia	2	1	3
(Russia) Krasnodar	1	1	2

Quarter-finals
(Portugal) Benfica	4	0	4
(Germany) Eintracht Frankfurt (a)	2	2	4
(Czech Republic) Slavia Prague	0	3	3
(England) Chelsea	1	4	5
(England) Arsenal	2	1	3
(Italy) Napoli	0	0	0
(Spain) Villarreal	1	0	1
(Spain) Valencia	3	2	5

Semi-finals
(Germany) Eintracht Frankfurt	1	1	2 (3)
(England) Chelsea (p)	1	1	2 (4)
(England) Arsenal	3	4	7
(Spain) Valencia	1	2	3

Final
29 May – Baku
(England) Chelsea	4
(England) Arsenal	1

=== Round of 32 ===
The draw for the round of 32 was held on 17 December 2018. The first legs were played on 12 and 14 February, and the second legs were played on 20 and 21 February 2019.

Team 1	Agg.	Team 2	1st leg	2nd leg
Viktoria Plzeň (Czech Republic)	2–4	(Croatia) Dinamo Zagreb	2–1	0–3
Club Brugge (Belgium)	2–5	(Austria) Red Bull Salzburg	2–1	0–4
Rapid Wien (Austria)	0–5	(Italy) Inter Milan	0–1	0–4
Slavia Prague (Czech Republic)	4–1	(Belgium) Genk	0–0	4–1
Krasnodar (Russia)	1–1 (a)	(Germany) Bayer Leverkusen	0–0	1–1
Zürich (Switzerland)	1–5	(Italy) Napoli	1–3	0–2
Malmö FF (Sweden)	1–5	(England) Chelsea	1–2	0–3
Shakhtar Donetsk (Ukraine)	3–6	(Germany) Eintracht Frankfurt	2–2	1–4
Celtic (Scotland)	0–3	(Spain) Valencia	0–2	0–1
Rennes (France)	6–4	(Spain) Real Betis	3–3	3–1
Olympiacos (Greece)	2–3	(Ukraine) Dynamo Kyiv	2–2	0–1
Lazio (Italy)	0–3	(Spain) Sevilla	0–1	0–2
Fenerbahçe (Turkey)	2–3	(Russia) Zenit Saint Petersburg	1–0	1–3
Sporting CP (Portugal)	1–2	(Spain) Villarreal	0–1	1–1
BATE Borisov (Belarus)	1–3	(England) Arsenal	1–0	0–3
Galatasaray (Turkey)	1–2	(Portugal) Benfica	1–2	0–0

=== Round of 16 ===
The draw for the round of 16 was held on 22 February 2019. The first legs were played on 7 March, and the second legs were played on 14 March 2019.

Team 1	Agg.	Team 2	1st leg	2nd leg
Chelsea (England)	8–0	(Ukraine) Dynamo Kyiv	3–0	5–0
Eintracht Frankfurt (Germany)	1–0	(Italy) Inter Milan	0–0	1–0
Dinamo Zagreb (Croatia)	1–3	(Portugal) Benfica	1–0	0–3 (a.e.t.)
Napoli (Italy)	4–3	(Austria) Red Bull Salzburg	3–0	1–3
Valencia (Spain)	3–2	(Russia) Krasnodar	2–1	1–1
Sevilla (Spain)	5–6	(Czech Republic) Slavia Prague	2–2	3–4 (a.e.t.)
Rennes (France)	3–4 (Note: Order of legs reversed after original draw, in order to avoid a scheduling conflict with the Chelsea v Dynamo Kyiv match in the same city.)	(England) Arsenal	3–1	0–3
Zenit Saint Petersburg (Russia)	2–5	(Spain) Villarreal	1–3	1–2

=== Quarter-finals ===
The draw for the quarter-finals was held on 15 March 2019. The first legs were played on 11 April, the second legs were played on 18 April 2019.

Team 1	Agg.	Team 2	1st leg	2nd leg
Arsenal (England)	3–0 (Note: Order of legs reversed after original draw, in order to avoid a scheduling conflict with the Chelsea v Slavia Prague match in the same city.)	(Italy) Napoli	2–0	1–0
Villarreal (Spain)	1–5	(Spain) Valencia	1–3	0–2
Benfica (Portugal)	4–4 (a)	(Germany) Eintracht Frankfurt	4–2	0–2
Slavia Prague (Czech Republic)	3–5	(England) Chelsea	0–1	3–4

=== Semi-finals ===
The draw for the semi-finals was held on 15 March 2019 (after the quarter-final draw). The first legs were played on 2 May, and the second legs were played on 9 May 2019.

Team 1	Agg.	Team 2	1st leg	2nd leg
Arsenal (England)	7–3	(Spain) Valencia	3–1	4–2
Eintracht Frankfurt (Germany)	2–2 (3–4 p)	(England) Chelsea	1–1	1–1 (a.e.t.)

=== Final ===
The final was played on 29 May 2019 at the Olympic Stadium in Baku. The "home" team (for administrative purposes) was determined by an additional draw held after the quarter-final and semi-final draws.

29 May 2019
23:00 UTC+4

Chelsea (England)	4–1	(England) Arsenal
Giroud 49'; Pedro 60'; Hazard 65' (pen.), 72'	Report	Iwobi 69'

Olympic Stadium, Baku
Attendance: 51,370
Referee: Gianluca Rocchi (Italy)

== Statistics ==
Statistics exclude qualifying rounds and play-off round.

=== Top goalscorers ===
Rank	Player	Team	Goals	Minutes played
1	(France) Olivier Giroud	(England) Chelsea	11	1124
2	(Serbia) Luka Jović	(Germany) Eintracht Frankfurt	10	953
3	(France) Wissam Ben Yedder	(Spain) Sevilla	8	621
3	(Israel) Mu'nas Dabbur	(Austria) Red Bull Salzburg	8	856
3	(Gabon) Pierre-Emerick Aubameyang	(England) Arsenal	8	934
6	(Norway) Fredrik Gulbrandsen	(Austria) Red Bull Salzburg	5	429
6	(Argentina) Giovani Lo Celso	(Spain) Real Betis	5	563
6	(France) Alexandre Lacazette	(England) Arsenal	5	651
6	(France) Sébastien Haller	(Germany) Eintracht Frankfurt	5	770
6	(Spain) Pedro	(England) Chelsea	5	944

=== Top assists ===
Rank	Player	Team	Assists	Minutes played
1	(Belarus) Ihar Stasevich	(Belarus) BATE Borisov	7	704
1	(Brazil) Willian	(England) Chelsea	7	899
3	(Serbia) Mijat Gaćinović	(Germany) Eintracht Frankfurt	6	1126
4	(Austria) Andreas Ulmer	(Austria) Red Bull Salzburg	5	900
4	(France) Olivier Giroud	(England) Chelsea	5	1124
6	(Ukraine) Viktor Tsyhankov	(Ukraine) Dynamo Kyiv	4	804
6	(Spain) Pedro	(England) Chelsea	4	944
8	24 players		3	—N/a

=== Squad of the Season ===
The UEFA technical study group selected the following 18 players as the squad of the tournament.

Pos.	Player	Team
GK	(Germany) Kevin Trapp	(Germany) Eintracht Frankfurt
GK	(Spain) Kepa Arrizabalaga	(England) Chelsea
DF	(Spain) Álex Grimaldo	(Portugal) Benfica
DF	(Bosnia and Herzegovina) Sead Kolašinac	(England) Arsenal
DF	(France) Laurent Koscielny	(England) Arsenal
DF	(Brazil) David Luiz	(England) Chelsea
DF	(Spain) César Azpilicueta	(England) Chelsea
DF	(Germany) Danny da Costa	(Germany) Eintracht Frankfurt
MF	(Japan) Makoto Hasebe	(Germany) Eintracht Frankfurt
MF	(Serbia) Filip Kostić	(Germany) Eintracht Frankfurt
MF	(Italy) Jorginho	(England) Chelsea
MF	(France) N'Golo Kanté	(England) Chelsea
FW	(Gabon) Pierre-Emerick Aubameyang	(England) Arsenal
FW	(France) Olivier Giroud	(England) Chelsea
FW	(Serbia) Luka Jović	(Germany) Eintracht Frankfurt
FW	(Portugal) João Félix	(Portugal) Benfica
FW	(Spain) Pedro	(England) Chelsea
FW	(Belgium) Eden Hazard	(England) Chelsea

=== Player of the Season ===
Votes were cast by coaches of the 48 teams in the group stage, together with 55 journalists selected by the European Sports Media (ESM) group, representing each of UEFA's member associations. The coaches were not allowed to vote for players from their own teams. Jury members selected their top three players, with the first receiving five points, the second three and the third one. The shortlist of the top three players was announced on 8 August 2019. The award winner was announced during the 2019–20 UEFA Europa League group stage draw in Monaco on 30 August 2019.

Rank	Player	Team	Points
Shortlist of top three
1	(Belgium) Eden Hazard	(England) Chelsea	340
2	(France) Olivier Giroud	(England) Chelsea	119
3	(Serbia) Luka Jović	(Germany) Eintracht Frankfurt	94
Players ranked 4–10
4	(Gabon) Pierre-Emerick Aubameyang	(England) Arsenal	65
5	(France) Alexandre Lacazette	(England) Arsenal	19
6	(France) N'Golo Kanté	(England) Chelsea	16
7	(Portugal) João Félix	(Portugal) Benfica	12
8	(Brazil) Willian	(England) Chelsea	11
9	(France) Sébastien Haller	(Germany) Eintracht Frankfurt	9
9	(Spain) Pedro	(England) Chelsea	9

== See also ==
- 2018–19 UEFA Champions League
- 2019 UEFA Super Cup
