= 2018–19 UEFA Europa League qualifying (preliminary to second round matches) =

European football competition

This page summarises the matches of the preliminary, first and second qualifying rounds of 2018–19 UEFA Europa League qualifying.

Times are CEST (UTC+2), as listed by UEFA (local times, if different, are in parentheses).

== Preliminary round ==
=== Summary ===
The first legs were played on 26 and 28 June, and the second legs on 5 July 2018.

Team 1	Agg.	Team 2	1st leg	2nd leg
Europa (Gibraltar)	1–6	(Kosovo) Prishtina	1–1	0–5
Sant Julià (Andorra)	1–4	(Malta) Gżira United	0–2	1–2
Engordany (Andorra)	3–2	(San Marino) Folgore	2–1	1–1
B36 (Faroe Islands)	2–2 (4–2 p)	(Gibraltar) St Joseph's	1–1	1–1 (a.e.t.)
Birkirkara (Malta)	2–3	(Faroe Islands) KÍ	1–1	1–2
Tre Fiori (San Marino)	3–1	(Wales) Bala Town	3–0	0–1
Cefn Druids (Wales)	1–2	(Lithuania) Trakai	1–1	0–1

=== Matches ===
28 June 2018
18:00

Europa (Gibraltar)	1–1	(Kosovo) Prishtina
Carreño 45' (pen.)	Report	Korenica 50'

Victoria Stadium, Gibraltar
Attendance: 350
Referee: João Capela (Portugal)
5 July 2018
19:00

Prishtina (Kosovo)	5–0	(Gibraltar) Europa
Dallku 9', 35'; Mankenda 13'; Januzi 59'; Pefqeli 86'	Report

Adem Jashari Olympic Stadium, Mitrovica (Note: Prishtina played their home matches at Adem Jashari Olympic Stadium, Mitrovica, instead of their regular stadium Fadil Vokrri Stadium, Pristina, due to renovation.)
Attendance: 1,140
Referee: Ioannis Papadopoulos (Greece)

Prishtina won 6–1 on aggregate.

26 June 2018
20:00

Sant Julià (Andorra)	0–2	(Malta) Gżira United
	Report	Samb 20' (pen.); Jorginho 87'

Estadi Comunal, Andorra la Vella
Attendance: 380
Referee: Denys Shurman (Ukraine)
5 July 2018
19:00

Gżira United (Malta)	2–1	(Andorra) Sant Julià
Samb 65' (pen.); Bilbao 90+2'	Report	Méndez 62'

Centenary Stadium, Ta' Qali
Attendance: 649
Referee: Juxhin Xhaja (Albania)

Gżira United won 4–1 on aggregate.

28 June 2018
20:00

Engordany (Andorra)	2–1	(San Marino) Folgore
Cellay 39'; Ruiz 86'	Report	Semeraro 72'

Estadi Comunal, Andorra la Vella
Attendance: 432
Referee: Kári Jóannesarson Á Høvdanum (Faroe Islands)
5 July 2018
20:45

Folgore (San Marino)	1–1	(Andorra) Engordany
Sacco 86'	Report	Sartori 90+5' (o.g.)

Stadio Tullo Morgagni, Forlì, Italy (Note: Folgore, La Fiorita and Tre Fiori played their home matches at Stadio Tullo Morgagni, Forlì, Italy, instead of their regular stadium San Marino Stadium, Serravalle, due to renovation.)
Attendance: 349
Referee: Zbyněk Proske (Czech Republic)

Engordany won 3–2 on aggregate.

28 June 2018
20:00 (19:00 UTC+1)

B36 (Faroe Islands)	1–1	(Gibraltar) St Joseph's
Cieślewicz 33' (pen.)	Report	Boro 41' (pen.)

Gundadalur, Tórshavn
Attendance: 200
Referee: Jari Järvinen (Finland)
5 July 2018
18:00

St Joseph's (Gibraltar)	1–1 (a.e.t.)	(Faroe Islands) B36
Otero 88'	Report	Cieślewicz 14' (pen.)
Penalties
Duarte (penalty scored); Muñoz (penalty scored); Martínez (penalty missed); Fernández (penalty missed)	2–4	(penalty scored) Jacobsen; (penalty scored) Mellemgaard; (penalty scored) Olsen; (penalty scored) Færø

Victoria Stadium, Gibraltar
Attendance: 536
Referee: Christophe Pires (Luxembourg)

2–2 on aggregate; B36 won 4–2 on penalties.

28 June 2018
19:00

Birkirkara (Malta)	1–1	(Faroe Islands) KÍ
Mifsud 72'	Report	Pavlović 88'

Centenary Stadium, Ta' Qali
Attendance: 954
Referee: Besfort Kasumi (Kosovo)
5 July 2018
20:00 (19:00 UTC+1)

KÍ (Faroe Islands)	2–1	(Malta) Birkirkara
Pavlović 45+2'; Klettskarð 59'	Report	Marcelinho 90'

Gundadalur, Tórshavn (Note: Klaksvík played their home matches at Gundadalur, Tórshavn, instead of their regular stadium Við Djúpumýrar, Klaksvík.)
Attendance: 1,100
Referee: Kristoffer Karlsson (Sweden)

KÍ won 3–2 on aggregate.

28 June 2018
20:45

Tre Fiori (San Marino)	3–0	(Wales) Bala Town
Miley 7' (o.g.); Pracucci 32'; Vassallo 36'	Report

Stadio Tullo Morgagni, Forlì, Italy
Attendance: 542
Referee: Stanislav Todorov (Bulgaria)
5 July 2018
19:30 (18:30 UTC+1)

Bala Town (Wales)	1–0	(San Marino) Tre Fiori
Burke 77'	Report

Belle Vue, Rhyl (Note: Bala Town played their home match at Belle Vue, Rhyl, instead of their regular stadium Maes Tegid, Bala, which did not meet UEFA requirements.)
Attendance: 610
Referee: Kristoffer Hagenes (Norway)

Tre Fiori won 3–1 on aggregate.

28 June 2018
20:00 (19:00 UTC+1)

Cefn Druids (Wales)	1–1	(Lithuania) Trakai
Davies 48'	Report	Kazlauskas 86'

Park Hall, Oswestry, England (Note: Cefn Druids played their home match at Park Hall, Oswestry, England, instead of their regular stadium The Rock, Wrexham, which did not meet UEFA requirements.)
Attendance: 742
Referee: Christopher Jäger (Austria)
5 July 2018
18:30 (19:30 UTC+3)

Trakai (Lithuania)	1–0	(Wales) Cefn Druids
Bilyaletdinov 29' (pen.)	Report

Alytus Stadium, Alytus (Note: Trakai played their preliminary round home match at Alytus Stadium, Alytus, instead of their regular stadium LFF Stadium, Vilnius, due to a music event held there.)
Attendance: 850
Referee: Dejan Jakimovski (Macedonia)

Trakai won 2–1 on aggregate.

== First qualifying round ==
=== Summary ===
The first legs were played on 10, 11 and 12 July, and the second legs on 17, 18 and 19 July 2018.

Team 1	Agg.	Team 2	1st leg	2nd leg
Stjarnan (Iceland)	3–1	(Estonia) Nõmme Kalju	3–0	0–1
Ilves (Finland)	1–3	(Bulgaria) Slavia Sofia	0–1	1–2
KÍ (Faroe Islands)	2–3	(Lithuania) Žalgiris	1–2	1–1
Fola Esch (Luxembourg)	0–0 (5–4 p)	(Kosovo) Prishtina	0–0	0–0 (a.e.t.)
Glenavon (Northern Ireland)	3–6	(Norway) Molde	2–1	1–5
DAC Dunajská Streda (Slovakia)	3–2	(Georgia (country)) Dinamo Tbilisi	1–1	2–1
Stumbras (Lithuania)	1–2	(Cyprus) Apollon Limassol	1–0	0–2
Široki Brijeg (Bosnia and Herzegovina)	3–3 (a)	(Slovenia) Domžale	2–2	1–1
Rangers (Scotland)	2–0	(North Macedonia) Shkupi	2–0	0–0
Gabala (Azerbaijan)	1–2 (Note: Order of legs reversed after original draw.)	(Luxembourg) Progrès Niederkorn	0–2	1–0
Racing Union (Luxembourg)	0–2	(Romania) Viitorul Constanța	0–2	0–0
Samtredia (Georgia (country))	0–3	(Kazakhstan) Tobol	0–1	0–2
Partizani (Albania)	0–3	(Slovenia) Maribor	0–1	0–2
Neftçi (Azerbaijan)	3–5	(Hungary) Újpest	3–1	0–4
Budućnost Podgorica (Montenegro)	1–3	(Slovakia) Trenčín	0–2	1–1
Derry City (Republic of Ireland)	2–3	(Belarus) Dinamo Minsk	0–2	2–1
B36 (Faroe Islands)	2–1	(Montenegro) Titograd Podgorica	0–0	2–1
Górnik Zabrze (Poland)	2–1	(Moldova) Zaria Bălți	1–0	1–1
Spartak Subotica (Serbia)	3–1	(Northern Ireland) Coleraine	1–1	2–0
Pyunik (Armenia)	3–0	(North Macedonia) Vardar	1–0	2–0
Shamrock Rovers (Republic of Ireland)	1–2	(Sweden) AIK	0–1	1–1 (a.e.t.)
Connah's Quay Nomads (Wales)	1–5	(Belarus) Shakhtyor Soligorsk	1–3	0–2
Lahti (Finland)	0–3	(Iceland) FH	0–3	0–0
Ventspils (Latvia)	8–3	(Albania) Luftëtari	5–0	3–3
Cliftonville (Northern Ireland)	1–3	(Denmark) Nordsjælland	0–1	1–2
Banants (Armenia)	1–5	(Bosnia and Herzegovina) Sarajevo	1–2	0–3
Engordany (Andorra)	1–10	(Kazakhstan) Kairat	0–3	1–7
Petrocub Hîncești (Moldova)	2–3	(Croatia) Osijek	1–1	1–2
Anorthosis Famagusta (Cyprus)	2–2 (a)	(Albania) Laçi	2–1	0–1
Ferencváros (Hungary)	1–2	(Israel) Maccabi Tel Aviv	1–1	0–1
Balzan (Malta)	5–3	(Azerbaijan) Keşla	4–1	1–2
Rabotnicki (North Macedonia)	2–5	(Hungary) Honvéd	2–1	0–4
Rudar Pljevlja (Montenegro)	0–6	(Serbia) Partizan	0–3	0–3
CSKA Sofia (Bulgaria)	1–1 (5–3 p)	(Latvia) Riga	1–0	0–1 (a.e.t.)
Milsami Orhei (Moldova)	2–9	(Slovakia) Slovan Bratislava	2–4	0–5
Radnički Niš (Serbia)	5–0	(Malta) Gżira United	4–0	1–0
Lech Poznań (Poland)	3–2	(Armenia) Gandzasar Kapan	2–0	1–2
Chikhura Sachkhere (Georgia (country))	2–1	(Israel) Beitar Jerusalem	0–0	2–1
Vaduz (Liechtenstein)	3–3 (a)	(Bulgaria) Levski Sofia	1–0	2–3
Narva Trans (Estonia)	1–5	(Bosnia and Herzegovina) Željezničar	0–2	1–3
Trakai (Lithuania)	1–0	(Kazakhstan) Irtysh	0–0	1–0
Hibernian (Scotland)	12–5	(Faroe Islands) NSÍ	6–1	6–4
Rudar Velenje (Slovenia)	10–0	(San Marino) Tre Fiori	7–0	3–0
FCI Levadia (Estonia)	1–3	(Republic of Ireland) Dundalk	0–1	1–2
ÍBV (Iceland)	0–6	(Norway) Sarpsborg 08	0–4	0–2
KuPS (Finland)	1–2	(Denmark) Copenhagen	0–1	1–1
Liepāja (Latvia)	2–4	(Sweden) BK Häcken	0–3	2–1

=== Matches ===
12 July 2018
22:00 (20:00 UTC+0)

Stjarnan (Iceland)	3–0	(Estonia) Nõmme Kalju
Halldórsson 19' (pen.); Sigurðsson 49'; Baldvinsson 70'	Report

Stjörnuvöllur, Garðabær
Attendance: 980
Referee: Radek Příhoda (Czech Republic)
19 July 2018
18:00 (19:00 UTC+3)

Nõmme Kalju (Estonia)	1–0	(Iceland) Stjarnan
Tamm 88'	Report

Kadriorg Stadium, Tallinn (Note: Nõmme Kalju played their home match at Kadriorg Stadium, Tallinn, instead of their regular stadium Hiiu Stadium, Tallinn.)
Attendance: 1,455
Referee: Giorgi Kruashvili (Georgia)

Stjarnan won 3–1 on aggregate.

12 July 2018
18:00 (19:00 UTC+3)

Ilves (Finland)	0–1	(Bulgaria) Slavia Sofia
	Report	Tsvetanov 80'

Telia 5G -areena, Helsinki (Note: Ilves played their home match in Helsinki because the Tampere Stadium was used for the 2018 IAAF World U20 Championships)
Attendance: 1,511
Referee: Krzysztof Jakubik (Poland)
19 July 2018
18:00 (19:00 UTC+3)

Slavia Sofia (Bulgaria)	2–1	(Finland) Ilves
Ivanov 36', 56'	Report	Noubissi 55'

Vasil Levski National Stadium, Sofia (Note: Slavia Sofia played their home matches at Vasil Levski National Stadium, Sofia, instead of their regular stadium Slavia Stadium, Sofia.)
Attendance: 3,400
Referee: Nenad Đokić (Serbia)

Slavia Sofia won 3–1 on aggregate.

11 July 2018
18:00 (17:00 UTC+1)

KÍ (Faroe Islands)	1–2	(Lithuania) Žalgiris
Bjartalíð 60' (pen.)	Report	Antal 40'; Mbodj 90+2'

Gundadalur, Tórshavn
Attendance: 487
Referee: Alain Durieux (Luxembourg)
19 July 2018
19:00 (20:00 UTC+3)

Žalgiris (Lithuania)	1–1	(Faroe Islands) KÍ
Antal 6'	Report	Møller-Iversen 66'

LFF Stadium, Vilnius
Attendance: 2,500
Referee: Milovan Milačić (Montenegro)

Žalgiris won 3–2 on aggregate.

11 July 2018
18:00

Fola Esch (Luxembourg)	0–0	(Kosovo) Prishtina
	Report

Stade Émile Mayrisch, Esch-sur-Alzette
Attendance: 1,007
Referee: Ívar Orri Kristjánsson (Iceland)
19 July 2018
19:00

Prishtina (Kosovo)	0–0 (a.e.t.)	(Luxembourg) Fola Esch
	Report
Penalties
Dallku (penalty scored); Korenica (penalty scored); Thaqi (penalty scored); Pefqeli (penalty missed); Hoxha (penalty missed); Boshnjaku (penalty missed); Haliti (penalty scored); Arago (penalty missed)	4–5	(penalty scored) Bensi; (penalty missed) Sacras; (penalty scored) Hadji; (penalty scored) Chrappan; (penalty missed) Muharemović; (penalty missed) Dikaba; (penalty scored) Klapp; (penalty scored) Mersch

Adem Jashari Olympic Stadium, Mitrovica
Attendance: 2,300
Referee: Urs Schnyder (Switzerland)

0–0 on aggregate; Fola Esch won 5–4 on penalties.

11 July 2018
20:45 (19:45 UTC+1)

Glenavon (Northern Ireland)	2–1	(Norway) Molde
Marshall 37'; Daniels 59'	Report	Hestad 36'

Mourneview Park, Lurgan
Attendance: 631
Referee: Mads-Kristoffer Kristoffersen (Denmark)
19 July 2018
18:00

Molde (Norway)	5–1	(Northern Ireland) Glenavon
Hussain 28' (pen.); Hestad 34', 59', 90'; Sarr 90+4'	Report	Forren 62' (o.g.)

Aker Stadion, Molde
Attendance: 5,150
Referee: Alexandru Tean (Moldova)

Molde won 6–3 on aggregate.

12 July 2018
21:00

DAC Dunajská Streda (Slovakia)	1–1	(Georgia (country)) Dinamo Tbilisi
Bayo 30'	Report	Zivzivadze 15'

MOL Aréna, Dunajská Streda
Attendance: 8,759
Referee: Irfan Peljto (Bosnia and Herzegovina)
19 July 2018
19:00 (21:00 UTC+4)

Dinamo Tbilisi (Georgia (country))	1–2	(Slovakia) DAC Dunajská Streda
Zivzivadze 41'	Report	Bayo 86', 90+4'

Boris Paichadze Dinamo Arena, Tbilisi
Attendance: 6,111
Referee: Dimitar Mečkarovski (Macedonia)

DAC Dunajská Streda won 3–2 on aggregate.

12 July 2018
19:00 (20:00 UTC+3)

Stumbras (Lithuania)	1–0	(Cyprus) Apollon Limassol
Matcharashvili 90+1'	Report

Alytus Stadium, Alytus (Note: Stumbras played their home match at Alytus Stadium, Alytus, instead of their regular stadium Darius and Girėnas Stadium, Kaunas, due to reconstruction.)
Attendance: 800
Referee: Georgi Vadachkoria (Georgia)
19 July 2018
19:00 (20:00 UTC+3)

Apollon Limassol (Cyprus)	2–0	(Lithuania) Stumbras
Yuste 7', 62'	Report

GSP Stadium, Nicosia (Note: Apollon Limassol played their home matches at GSP Stadium, Nicosia, instead of their regular stadium Tsirio Stadium, Limassol.)
Attendance: 2,556
Referee: Eldorjan Hamiti (Albania)

Apollon Limassol won 2–1 on aggregate.

12 July 2018
20:00

Široki Brijeg (Bosnia and Herzegovina)	2–2	(Slovenia) Domžale
Turčin 47'; Marković 83'	Report	Bizjak 12'; Melnjak 26'

Stadion Pecara, Široki Brijeg
Attendance: 2,500
Referee: Petr Ardeleánu (Czech Republic)
19 July 2018
21:00

Domžale (Slovenia)	1–1	(Bosnia and Herzegovina) Široki Brijeg
Melnjak 11'	Report	Matić 73'

Domžale Sports Park, Domžale
Attendance: 2,000
Referee: Antti Munukka (Finland)

3–3 on aggregate; Domžale won on away goals.

12 July 2018
20:45 (19:45 UTC+1)

Rangers (Scotland)	2–0	(North Macedonia) Shkupi
Murphy 23'; Tavernier 90+2' (pen.)	Report

Ibrox Stadium, Glasgow
Attendance: 49,309
Referee: Christian Dingert (Germany)
17 July 2018
17:55

Shkupi (North Macedonia)	0–0	(Scotland) Rangers
	Report

Philip II Arena, Skopje (Note: Shkupi played their home match at Philip II Arena, Skopje, instead of their regular stadium Čair Stadium, Čair.)
Attendance: 4,750
Referee: Halil Umut Meler (Turkey)

Rangers won 2–0 on aggregate.

12 July 2018
18:00 (20:00 UTC+4)

Gabala (Azerbaijan)	0–2	(Luxembourg) Progrès Niederkorn
	Report	De Almeida 51'; O.Thill 61' (pen.)

Gabala City Stadium, Qabala
Attendance: 1,600
Referee: Veaceslav Banari (Moldova)
19 July 2018
19:30

Progrès Niederkorn (Luxembourg)	0–1	(Azerbaijan) Gabala
	Report	Joseph-Monrose 28'

Stade Municipal, Differdange (Note: Progrès Niederkorn played their home matches at Stade Municipal, Differdange, instead of their regular stadium Stade Jos Haupert, Niederkorn.)
Attendance: 1,842
Referee: Keith Kennedy (Northern Ireland)

Progrès Niederkorn won 2–1 on aggregate.

12 July 2018
20:00

Racing Union (Luxembourg)	0–2	(Romania) Viitorul Constanța
	Report	Drăguș 23'; Hagi 82' (pen.)

Stade Josy Barthel, Luxembourg City (Note: Racing FC played their home match at Stade Josy Barthel, Luxembourg City, instead of their regular stadium Stade Achille Hammerel, Luxembourg City.)
Attendance: 1,383
Referee: Alex Troleis (Faroe Islands)
19 July 2018
17:00 (18:00 UTC+3)

Viitorul Constanța (Romania)	0–0	(Luxembourg) Racing Union
	Report

Stadionul Viitorul, Ovidiu
Attendance: 2,130
Referee: Alexandr Aliyev (Kazakhstan)

Viitorul Constanța won 2–0 on aggregate.

10 July 2018
18:00 (20:00 UTC+4)

Samtredia (Georgia (country))	0–1	(Kazakhstan) Tobol
	Report	Fedin 90+5'

Mikheil Meskhi Stadium, Tbilisi (Note: Samtredia played their home match at Mikheil Meskhi Stadium, Tbilisi, instead of their regular stadium Erosi Manjgaladze Stadium, Samtredia.)
Attendance: 778
Referee: Tim Marshall (Northern Ireland)
19 July 2018
15:00 (19:00 UTC+6)

Tobol (Kazakhstan)	2–0	(Georgia (country)) Samtredia
Turysbek 12'; Darabayev 83'	Report

Kostanay Central Stadium, Kostanay
Attendance: 8,012
Referee: Tihomir Pejin (Croatia)

Tobol won 3–0 on aggregate.

12 July 2018
17:30

Partizani (Albania)	0–1	(Slovenia) Maribor
	Report	Bajde 50'

Selman Stërmasi Stadium, Tirana
Attendance: 1,050
Referee: Jérôme Brisard (France)
19 July 2018
20:15

Maribor (Slovenia)	2–0	(Albania) Partizani
Dervišević 31'; Tavares 90+3'	Report

Ljudski vrt, Maribor
Attendance: 6,876
Referee: Paul Tierney (England)

Maribor won 3–0 on aggregate.

12 July 2018
19:00 (21:00 UTC+4)

Neftçi (Azerbaijan)	3–1	(Hungary) Újpest
Dabo 23', 72'; Makhmudov 90+2'	Report	Nagy 9'

Dalga Arena, Baku (Note: Neftçi Baku played their home match at Dalga Arena, Baku, instead of their regular stadium Bakcell Arena, Baku.)
Attendance: 4,000
Referee: Dennis Higler (Netherlands)
19 July 2018
21:00

Újpest (Hungary)	4–0	(Azerbaijan) Neftçi
Litauszki 19'; Sanković 21'; Zsótér 49'; Nwobodo 65'	Report

Szusza Ferenc stadion, Budapest
Attendance: 3,738
Referee: Ioannis Papadopoulos (Greece)

Újpest won 5–3 on aggregate.

12 July 2018
20:30

Budućnost Podgorica (Montenegro)	0–2	(Slovakia) Trenčín
	Report	Čataković 27'; Mance 30'

Podgorica City Stadium, Podgorica
Attendance: 2,000
Referee: Mete Kalkavan (Turkey)
19 July 2018
20:30

Trenčín (Slovakia)	1–1	(Montenegro) Budućnost Podgorica
Mance 70'	Report	Perović 90'

Stadium Myjava, Myjava (Note: Trenčín played their first and second qualifying rounds home matches at Stadium Myjava, Myjava and third qualifying and play-off rounds home matches at Štadión pod Dubňom, Žilina, instead of their regular stadium Štadión na Sihoti, Trenčín, due to renovation.)
Attendance: 1,520
Referee: Sergey Lapochkin (Russia)

Trenčín won 3–1 on aggregate.

12 July 2018
19:00 (18:00 UTC+1)

Derry City (Republic of Ireland)	0–2	(Belarus) Dinamo Minsk
	Report	Galović 2'; Khvashchynski 64'

Brandywell Stadium, Derry
Attendance: 1,467
Referee: Nikola Popov (Bulgaria)
19 July 2018
17:00 (18:00 UTC+3)

Dinamo Minsk (Belarus)	1–2	(Republic of Ireland) Derry City
Sachywka 28'	Report	Roy 7'; Ron. Hale 75'

Dinamo Stadium, Minsk
Attendance: 13,750
Referee: Jens Maae (Denmark)

Dinamo Minsk won 3–2 on aggregate.

12 July 2018
20:00 (19:00 UTC+1)

B36 (Faroe Islands)	0–0	(Montenegro) Titograd Podgorica
	Report

Gundadalur, Tórshavn
Attendance: 611
Referee: Aleksandrs Anufrijevs (Latvia)
19 July 2018
20:30

Titograd Podgorica (Montenegro)	1–2	(Faroe Islands) B36
Petrović 4'	Report	Heinesen 51'; Radulović 83' (o.g.)

Podgorica City Stadium, Podgorica (Note: Titograd Podgorica played their home match at Podgorica City Stadium, Podgorica, instead of their regular stadium Mladost Stadium, Podgorica.)
Attendance: 2,050
Referee: Omar Pashayev (Azerbaijan)

B36 won 2–1 on aggregate.

12 July 2018
20:00

Górnik Zabrze (Poland)	1–0	(Moldova) Zaria Bălți
Angulo 87'	Report

Ernest Pohl Stadium, Zabrze
Attendance: 19,528
Referee: Filip Glova (Slovakia)
19 July 2018
19:00 (20:00 UTC+3)

Zaria Bălți (Moldova)	1–1	(Poland) Górnik Zabrze
Guilherme Silva 7'	Report	Smuga 85'

Zimbru Stadium, Chișinău (Note: Zaria Bălți played their home match at Zimbru Stadium, Chișinău, instead of their regular stadium Stadionul Orășenesc, Bălți.)
Attendance: 1,300
Referee: Rahim Hasanov (Azerbaijan)

Górnik Zabrze won 2–1 on aggregate.

12 July 2018
20:45

Spartak Subotica (Serbia)	1–1	(Northern Ireland) Coleraine
Savković 90+4' (pen.)	Report	McCauley 23'

Karađorđe Stadium, Novi Sad (Note: Spartak Subotica played their first and second qualifying rounds home matches at Karađorđe Stadium, Novi Sad and third qualifying round home match at Red Star Stadium, Belgrade, instead of their regular stadium Subotica City Stadium, Subotica.)
Attendance: 976
Referee: Aleksei Matyunin (Russia)
19 July 2018
20:45 (19:45 UTC+1)

Coleraine (Northern Ireland)	0–2	(Serbia) Spartak Subotica
	Report	Savković 33'; Čečarić 90+2'

The Showgrounds, Coleraine
Attendance: 1,602
Referee: Trustin Farrugia Cann (Malta)

Spartak Subotica won 3–1 on aggregate.

12 July 2018
16:00 (18:00 UTC+4)

Pyunik (Armenia)	1–0	(North Macedonia) Vardar
Konaté 28'	Report

Vazgen Sargsyan Republican Stadium, Yerevan
Attendance: 2,000
Referee: Michal Očenáš (Slovakia)
19 July 2018
19:00

Vardar (North Macedonia)	0–2	(Armenia) Pyunik
	Report	Baldé 85', 89'

Philip II Arena, Skopje
Attendance: 5,823
Referee: Ian McNabb (Northern Ireland)

Pyunik won 3–0 on aggregate.

12 July 2018
20:05 (19:05 UTC+1)

Shamrock Rovers (Republic of Ireland)	0–1	(Sweden) AIK
	Report	Sundgren 74'

Tallaght Stadium, Tallaght
Attendance: 2,817
Referee: Alexander Harkam (Austria)
19 July 2018
19:00

AIK (Sweden)	1–1 (a.e.t.)	(Republic of Ireland) Shamrock Rovers
Stefanelli 94'	Report	Carr 19'

Friends Arena, Solna
Attendance: 8,115
Referee: Nicolas Laforge (Belgium)

AIK won 2–1 on aggregate.

12 July 2018
19:00 (18:00 UTC+1)

Connah's Quay Nomads (Wales)	1–3	(Belarus) Shakhtyor Soligorsk
Morris 89' (pen.)	Report	Ebong 20'; Bakaj 34'; Shibun 75'

Belle Vue, Rhyl (Note: Connah's Quay Nomads played their home match at Belle Vue, Rhyl, instead of their regular stadium Deeside Stadium, Deeside.)
Attendance: 577
Referee: Juri Frischer (Estonia)
19 July 2018
19:00 (20:00 UTC+3)

Shakhtyor Soligorsk (Belarus)	2–0	(Wales) Connah's Quay Nomads
Bakaj 24' (pen.); Bardachow 82'	Report

Stroitel Stadium, Salihorsk
Attendance: 2,700
Referee: Admir Šehović (Bosnia and Herzegovina)

Shakhtyor Soligorsk won 5–1 on aggregate.

12 July 2018
18:00 (19:00 UTC+3)

Lahti (Finland)	0–3	(Iceland) FH
	Report	Björnsson 4'; Lennon 18'; Crawford 90'

Lahti Stadium, Lahti
Attendance: 3,178
Referee: Yaroslav Kozyk (Ukraine)
19 July 2018
21:15 (19:15 UTC+0)

FH (Iceland)	0–0	(Finland) Lahti
	Report

Kaplakriki, Hafnarfjörður
Attendance: 742
Referee: Espen Eskås (Norway)

FH won 3–0 on aggregate.

12 July 2018
16:45 (17:45 UTC+3)

Ventspils (Latvia)	5–0	(Albania) Luftëtari
Akinyemi 8' (pen.), 12', 24', 43'; Aiyegun 37' (pen.)	Report

Ventspils Olimpiskais Stadions, Ventspils
Attendance: 2,300
Referee: Vasilis Dimitriou (Cyprus)
19 July 2018
20:00

Luftëtari (Albania)	3–3	(Latvia) Ventspils
Shkurti 44' (pen.); Ymeraj 55'; Milosavljev 61'	Report	Akinyemi 45+4', 45+8'; Alfa 90+3'

Elbasan Arena, Elbasan (Note: Luftëtari played their home match at Elbasan Arena, Elbasan, instead of their regular stadium Gjirokastra Stadium, Gjirokastër.)
Attendance: 270
Referee: Anders Poulsen (Denmark)

Ventspils won 8–3 on aggregate.

12 July 2018
20:45 (19:45 UTC+1)

Cliftonville (Northern Ireland)	0–1	(Denmark) Nordsjælland
	Report	Olsen 19'

Solitude, Belfast
Attendance: 1,170
Referee: Sándor Szabó (Hungary)
19 July 2018
19:30

Nordsjælland (Denmark)	2–1	(Northern Ireland) Cliftonville
Donyoh 58'; Harney 83' (o.g.)	Report	Gormley 6' (pen.)

Farum Park, Farum
Attendance: 1,592
Referee: Eitan Shemeulevitch (Israel)

Nordsjælland won 3–1 on aggregate.

11 July 2018
15:30 (17:30 UTC+4)

Banants (Armenia)	1–2	(Bosnia and Herzegovina) Sarajevo
Ayvazyan 34'	Report	Ahmetović 16'; Halilović 21'

Banants Stadium, Yerevan
Attendance: 3,000
Referee: Rohit Saggi (Norway)
19 July 2018
20:15

Sarajevo (Bosnia and Herzegovina)	3–0	(Armenia) Banants
Mujakić 31'; Ahmetović 38'; Resić 72'	Report

Asim Ferhatović Hase Stadium, Sarajevo
Attendance: 8,125
Referee: Lionel Tschudi (Switzerland)

Sarajevo won 5–1 on aggregate.

12 July 2018
20:00

Engordany (Andorra)	0–3	(Kazakhstan) Kairat
	Report	Wagner 5' (o.g.); Islamkhan 25' (pen.); Eppel 90'

Estadi Comunal, Andorra la Vella
Attendance: 657
Referee: Iwan Arwel Griffith (Wales)
19 July 2018
15:00 (19:00 UTC+6)

Kairat (Kazakhstan)	7–1	(Andorra) Engordany
Eppel 4', 11', 44', 75'; Eseola 42'; Islamkhan 53'; Vorogovskiy 87'	Report	Lafont 72'

Almaty Central Stadium, Almaty
Attendance: 10,500
Referee: Jovan Kaluđerović (Montenegro)

Kairat won 10–1 on aggregate.

12 July 2018
19:00 (20:00 UTC+3)

Petrocub Hîncești (Moldova)	1–1	(Croatia) Osijek
Ambros 65'	Report	Marić 52'

Zimbru Stadium, Chișinău (Note: Petrocub Hîncești played their home match at Zimbru Stadium, Chișinău, instead of their regular stadium Stadionul Municipal, Hîncești.)
Attendance: 2,700
Referee: Karim Abed (France)
19 July 2018
20:45

Osijek (Croatia)	2–1	(Moldova) Petrocub Hîncești
Mudražija 15'; Barišić 61'	Report	Ambros 22' (pen.)

Stadion Gradski vrt, Osijek
Attendance: 2,233
Referee: Dimitrios Massias (Cyprus)

Osijek won 3–2 on aggregate.

12 July 2018
19:00 (20:00 UTC+3)

Anorthosis Famagusta (Cyprus)	2–1	(Albania) Laçi
Pranjić 52' (pen.); Cissé 59'	Report	Hoxhallari 21'

Antonis Papadopoulos Stadium, Larnaca
Attendance: 2
Referee: José María Sánchez Martínez (Spain)
19 July 2018
17:00

Laçi (Albania)	1–0	(Cyprus) Anorthosis Famagusta
Uzuni 88'	Report

Laçi Stadium, Laçi
Attendance: 1,950
Referee: Donatas Rumšas (Lithuania)

2–2 on aggregate; Laçi won on away goals.

12 July 2018
19:00

Ferencváros (Hungary)	1–1	(Israel) Maccabi Tel Aviv
Spirovski 61'	Report	Atar 90+1'

Groupama Arena, Budapest
Attendance: 14,127
Referee: Ricardo de Burgos Bengoetxea (Spain)
19 July 2018
19:00 (20:00 UTC+3)

Maccabi Tel Aviv (Israel)	1–0	(Hungary) Ferencváros
Atar 45+1'	Report

Netanya Stadium, Netanya (Note: Maccabi Tel Aviv played their home matches at Netanya Stadium, Netanya, instead of their regular stadium Bloomfield Stadium, Tel Aviv, due to renovation.)
Attendance: 8,256
Referee: Hugo Miguel (Portugal)

Maccabi Tel Aviv won 2–1 on aggregate.

12 July 2018
18:00

Balzan (Malta)	4–1	(Azerbaijan) Keşla
Effiong 12'; Lecão 21'; Kaljević 34'; Cadú 55'	Report	Colli 29' (pen.)

Centenary Stadium, Ta' Qali
Attendance: 504
Referee: Volen Chinkov (Bulgaria)
19 July 2018
19:00 (21:00 UTC+4)

Keşla (Azerbaijan)	2–1	(Malta) Balzan
Colli 11' (pen.); Alkhasov 90+1'	Report	Majdevac 90+6'

Dalga Arena, Baku (Note: Keşla played their home match at Dalga Arena, Baku, instead of their regular stadium Inter Arena, Baku.)
Attendance: 2,215
Referee: Mikhail Vilkov (Russia)

Balzan won 5–3 on aggregate.

11 July 2018
17:30

Rabotnicki (North Macedonia)	2–1	(Hungary) Honvéd
Petkovski 34'; Sharkoski 60'	Report	Nagy 45+1'

Training Centre Petar Miloševski, Skopje (Note: Rabotnički played their home match at Training Centre Petar Miloševski, Skopje, instead of their regular stadium Philip II Arena, Skopje, which was used for Shkëndija v The New Saints match the day before.)
Attendance: 730
Referee: Kristo Tohver (Estonia)
17 July 2018
18:00

Honvéd (Hungary)	4–0	(North Macedonia) Rabotnicki
Holender 6', 16'; Danilo 63' (pen.), 84'	Report

Bozsik József Stadion, Budapest
Attendance: 64
Referee: Marius Avram (Romania) (Note: Avram was injured and replaced by fourth official Iulian Călin (Romania) in the 29th minute.)

Honvéd won 5–2 on aggregate.

12 July 2018
20:15

Rudar Pljevlja (Montenegro)	0–3	(Serbia) Partizan
	Report	Jevtović 44' (pen.); Soumah 50'; Ricardo 57'

Gradski stadion, Nikšić (Note: Rudar Pljevlja played their home match at Gradski stadion, Niksic, instead of their regular stadium Gradski stadion, Pljevlja.)
Attendance: 3,150
Referee: Stuart Attwell (England)
19 July 2018
20:30

Partizan (Serbia)	3–0	(Montenegro) Rudar Pljevlja
Pantić 11'; Ožegović 44'; Ricardo 83'	Report

Partizan Stadium, Belgrade
Attendance: 5,869
Referee: Daniele Doveri (Italy)

Partizan won 6–0 on aggregate.

12 July 2018
19:45 (20:45 UTC+3)

CSKA Sofia (Bulgaria)	1–0	(Latvia) Riga
Rodrigues 49'	Report

Balgarska Armia Stadium, Sofia
Attendance: 7,500
Referee: Mario Zebec (Croatia)
19 July 2018
18:30 (19:30 UTC+3)

Riga (Latvia)	1–0 (a.e.t.)	(Bulgaria) CSKA Sofia
Černomordijs 44'	Report
Penalties
Lemajić (penalty missed); Primão (penalty scored); Kārkliņš (penalty scored); Bayenko (penalty scored)	3–5	(penalty scored) Malinov; (penalty scored) Bodurov; (penalty scored) Geferson; (penalty scored) Gyasi; (penalty scored) Despodov

Skonto Stadium, Riga
Attendance: 3,100
Referee: Furkat Atazhanov (Kazakhstan)

1–1 on aggregate; CSKA Sofia won 5–3 on penalties.

12 July 2018
19:00 (20:00 UTC+3)

Milsami Orhei (Moldova)	2–4	(Slovakia) Slovan Bratislava
Bugaev 59'; Surdu 75'	Report	Rharsalla 10', 41'; Šporar 22'; Crăciun 79' (o.g.)

CSR Orhei, Orhei
Attendance: 3,000
Referee: Vitaliy Romanov (Ukraine)
19 July 2018
18:30

Slovan Bratislava (Slovakia)	5–0	(Moldova) Milsami Orhei
Šporar 15', 25'; Rharsalla 33', 77'; Cmiljanić 52'	Report

Štadión Pasienky, Bratislava
Attendance: 3,175
Referee: Nejc Kajtazović (Slovenia)

Slovan Bratislava won 9–2 on aggregate.

12 July 2018
21:00

Radnički Niš (Serbia)	4–0	(Malta) Gżira United
Pankov 14'; Haskić 53', 85'; Mrkić 55'	Report

Čair Stadium, Niš
Attendance: 8,500
Referee: Jason Barcelo (Gibraltar)
19 July 2018
18:00

Gżira United (Malta)	0–1	(Serbia) Radnički Niš
	Report	Pankov 7'

Centenary Stadium, Ta' Qali
Attendance: 509
Referee: Suren Baliyan (Armenia)

Radnički Niš won 5–0 on aggregate.

12 July 2018
20:45

Lech Poznań (Poland)	2–0	(Armenia) Gandzasar Kapan
Gytkjær 10', 15' (pen.)	Report

Stadion Miejski, Poznań
Attendance: 0 (Note: The match was played behind closed doors.)
Referee: Yigal Frid (Israel)
19 July 2018
17:00 (19:00 UTC+4)

Gandzasar Kapan (Armenia)	2–1	(Poland) Lech Poznań
Musonda 50'; Harutyunyan 67'	Report	Trałka 90+5'

Vazgen Sargsyan Republican Stadium, Yerevan (Note: Gandzasar Kapan played their home match at Vazgen Sargsyan Republican Stadium, Yerevan, instead of their regular stadium Gandzasar Stadium, Kapan, due to renovation.)
Attendance: 1,645
Referee: Mohammed Al-Hakim (Sweden)

Lech Poznań won 3–2 on aggregate.

12 July 2018
17:00 (19:00 UTC+4)

Chikhura Sachkhere (Georgia (country))	0–0	(Israel) Beitar Jerusalem
	Report

Mikheil Meskhi Stadium, Tbilisi (Note: Chikhura Sachkhere played their home matches at Mikheil Meskhi Stadium, Tbilisi, instead of their regular stadium Central Stadium, Sachkhere.)
Attendance: 1,220
Referee: Kai Erik Steen (Norway)
19 July 2018
19:45 (20:45 UTC+3)

Beitar Jerusalem (Israel)	1–2	(Georgia (country)) Chikhura Sachkhere
Vered 62'	Report	Kakubava 73'; Gabedava 83' (pen.)

Teddy Stadium, Jerusalem
Attendance: 1,300
Referee: Marco Di Bello (Italy)

Chikhura Sachkhere won 2–1 on aggregate.

11 July 2018
17:45

Vaduz (Liechtenstein)	1–0	(Bulgaria) Levski Sofia
Coulibaly 14'	Report

Rheinpark Stadion, Vaduz
Attendance: 1,243
Referee: Fran Jović (Croatia)
17 July 2018
17:45 (18:45 UTC+3)

Levski Sofia (Bulgaria)	3–2	(Liechtenstein) Vaduz
Buș 35'; Belaïd 53'; Cabral 85'	Report	Coulibaly 25'; Tadić 55'

Vivacom Arena - Georgi Asparuhov Stadium, Sofia
Attendance: 6,100
Referee: Rob Harvey (Republic of Ireland)

3–3 on aggregate; Vaduz won on away goals.

12 July 2018
18:00 (19:00 UTC+3)

Narva Trans (Estonia)	0–2	(Bosnia and Herzegovina) Željezničar
	Report	Kotenko 15' (o.g.); Šabanadžović 74'

A. Le Coq Arena, Tallinn (Note: Narva Trans played their home match at A. Le Coq Arena, Tallinn, instead of their regular stadium Narva Kreenholmi Stadium, Narva.)
Attendance: 263
Referee: Daniyar Sakhi (Kazakhstan)
18 July 2018
18:00

Željezničar (Bosnia and Herzegovina)	3–1	(Estonia) Narva Trans
Zajmović 25'; Krpić 29', 82'	Report	Plotnikov 5'

Stadion Grbavica, Sarajevo
Attendance: 7,603
Referee: Cătălin Găman (Romania)

Željezničar won 5–1 on aggregate.

12 July 2018
18:00 (19:00 UTC+3)

Trakai (Lithuania)	0–0	(Kazakhstan) Irtysh
	Report

LFF Stadium, Vilnius
Attendance: 400
Referee: Fábio Veríssimo (Portugal)
19 July 2018
17:00 (21:00 UTC+6)

Irtysh (Kazakhstan)	0–1	(Lithuania) Trakai
	Report	Čyžas 19'

Pavlodar Central Stadium, Pavlodar
Attendance: 6,250
Referee: Luca Barbeno (San Marino)

Trakai won 1–0 on aggregate.

12 July 2018
20:45 (19:45 UTC+1)

Hibernian (Scotland)	6–1	(Faroe Islands) NSÍ
Kamberi 3' (pen.), 21', 48'; Shaw 29'; Mallan 43', 83'	Report	Knudsen 53'

Easter Road, Edinburgh
Attendance: 12,501
Referee: Manfredas Lukjančukas (Lithuania)
19 July 2018
20:45 (19:45 UTC+1)

NSÍ (Faroe Islands)	4–6	(Scotland) Hibernian
Ambrose 1' (o.g.); Olsen 6', 35', 57'	Report	McGinn 10'; Stevenson 16'; Gray 45'; Ambrose 50'; Mallan 70', 77'

Svangaskarð, Toftir
Attendance: 587
Referee: Luís Teixeira (Andorra)

Hibernian won 12–5 on aggregate.

12 July 2018
17:30

Rudar Velenje (Slovenia)	7–0	(San Marino) Tre Fiori
Tučić 33', 59'; Radić 48', 78'; Parfitt-Williams 49'; Della Valle 75' (o.g.); Solomun 84'	Report

Ob Jezeru City Stadium, Velenje
Attendance: 923
Referee: Luís Godinho (Portugal)
19 July 2018
20:45

Tre Fiori (San Marino)	0–3	(Slovenia) Rudar Velenje
	Report	Bolha 43'; Šimunac 47'; Kamara 71'

Stadio Tullo Morgagni, Forlì, Italy
Attendance: 245
Referee: Fyodor Zammit (Malta)

Rudar Velenje won 10–0 on aggregate.

12 July 2018
18:00 (19:00 UTC+3)

FCI Levadia (Estonia)	0–1	(Republic of Ireland) Dundalk
	Report	Connolly 53'

Kadriorg Stadium, Tallinn
Attendance: 1,343
Referee: Bojan Nikolić (Serbia)
19 July 2018
20:45 (19:45 UTC+1)

Dundalk (Republic of Ireland)	2–1	(Estonia) FCI Levadia
Hoban 31'; Duffy 33'	Report	Debelko 42'

Oriel Park, Dundalk
Attendance: 3,000
Referee: Adrien Jaccottet (Switzerland)

Dundalk won 3–1 on aggregate.

12 July 2018
20:00 (18:00 UTC+0)

ÍBV (Iceland)	0–4	(Norway) Sarpsborg 08
	Report	Muhammed 59'; Mortensen 66'; Halvorsen 90+1'; Askar 90+4'

Hásteinsvöllur, Vestmannaeyjar
Attendance: 673
Referee: Nick Walsh (Scotland)
19 July 2018
19:00

Sarpsborg 08 (Norway)	2–0	(Iceland) ÍBV
Agger 13', 82'	Report

Sarpsborg Stadion, Sarpsborg
Attendance: 3,552
Referee: Genc Nuza (Kosovo)

Sarpsborg 08 won 6–0 on aggregate.

12 July 2018
18:00 (19:00 UTC+3)

KuPS (Finland)	0–1	(Denmark) Copenhagen
	Report	Skov 75'

Kuopio Football Stadium, Kuopio
Attendance: 2,890
Referee: Kirill Levnikov (Russia)
19 July 2018
20:00

Copenhagen (Denmark)	1–1	(Finland) KuPS
Vavro 81' (pen.)	Report	Karjalainen 75'

Parken Stadium, Copenhagen
Attendance: 7,145
Referee: Vilhjálmur Thórarinsson (Iceland)

Copenhagen won 2–1 on aggregate.

12 July 2018
18:05 (19:05 UTC+3)

Liepāja (Latvia)	0–3	(Sweden) BK Häcken
	Report	Irandust 74'; Paulinho 77'; Çelik 82'

Daugava Stadium, Liepāja
Attendance: 2,234
Referee: Marco Guida (Italy)
19 July 2018
19:00

BK Häcken (Sweden)	1–2	(Latvia) Liepāja
Mohammed 42'	Report	Gueye 11'; Karlsons 86'

Bravida Arena, Gothenburg
Attendance: 1,713
Referee: Sergey Ivanov (Russia)

BK Häcken won 4–2 on aggregate.

== Second qualifying round ==
=== Summary ===
The first legs were played on 26 July, and the second legs on 31 July, 1 and 2 August 2018.

Team 1	Agg.	Team 2	1st leg	2nd leg
Champions Path
Cork City (Republic of Ireland)	Bye	N/A	—	—
The New Saints (Wales)	3–2	(Gibraltar) Lincoln Red Imps	2–1	1–1
Torpedo Kutaisi (Georgia (country))	7–0	(Faroe Islands) Víkingur Gøta	3–0	4–0
Zrinjski Mostar (Bosnia and Herzegovina)	3–2	(Malta) Valletta	1–1	2–1
FC Santa Coloma (Andorra)	1–3	(Iceland) Valur	1–0	0–3
Sutjeska (Montenegro)	0–1	(Armenia) Alashkert	0–1	0–0
F91 Dudelange (Luxembourg)	3–2	(Kosovo) Drita	2–1	1–1
Spartaks Jūrmala (Latvia)	9–0	(San Marino) La Fiorita	6–0	3–0
APOEL (Cyprus)	5–2	(Estonia) Flora	5–0	0–2
Olimpija Ljubljana (Slovenia)	6–2	(Northern Ireland) Crusaders	5–1	1–1
Main Path
Molde (Norway)	5–0	(Albania) Laçi	3–0	2–0
Atalanta (Italy)	10–2 (Note: Order of legs reversed after original draw.)	(Bosnia and Herzegovina) Sarajevo	2–2	8–0
Žalgiris (Lithuania)	2–1	(Liechtenstein) Vaduz	1–0	1–1
Kairat (Kazakhstan)	3–2	(Netherlands) AZ	2–0	1–2
Aberdeen (Scotland)	2–4	(England) Burnley	1–1	1–3 (a.e.t.)
Partizan (Serbia)	2–1	(Lithuania) Trakai	1–0	1–1
Balzan (Malta)	3–4	(Slovakia) Slovan Bratislava	2–1	1–3
Nordsjælland (Denmark)	2–0	(Sweden) AIK	1–0	1–0
Rudar Velenje (Slovenia)	0–6	(Romania) FCSB	0–2	0–4
Hapoel Haifa (Israel)	2–1	(Iceland) FH	1–1	1–0
Dundalk (Republic of Ireland)	0–4	(Cyprus) AEK Larnaca	0–0	0–4
Górnik Zabrze (Poland)	1–5	(Slovakia) Trenčín	0–1	1–4
Maccabi Tel Aviv (Israel)	4–2	(Serbia) Radnički Niš	2–0	2–2
CSKA Sofia (Bulgaria)	6–1	(Austria) Flyeralarm Admira	3–0	3–1
Spartak Subotica (Serbia)	3–2	(Czech Republic) Sparta Prague	2–0	1–2
RB Leipzig (Germany)	5–1	(Sweden) BK Häcken	4–0	1–1
Stjarnan (Iceland)	0–7	(Denmark) Copenhagen	0–2	0–5
Ufa (Russia)	1–1 (a)	(Slovenia) Domžale	0–0	1–1
Tobol (Kazakhstan)	2–2 (a)	(Armenia) Pyunik	2–1	0–1
Jagiellonia Białystok (Poland)	5–4	(Portugal) Rio Ave	1–0	4–4
LASK (Austria)	6–1	(Norway) Lillestrøm	4–0	2–1
Honvéd (Hungary)	1–2	(Luxembourg) Progrès Niederkorn	1–0	0–2
Osijek (Croatia)	1–2	(Scotland) Rangers	0–1	1–1
B36 (Faroe Islands)	0–8	(Turkey) Beşiktaş	0–2	0–6
DAC Dunajská Streda (Slovakia)	2–7	(Belarus) Dinamo Minsk	1–3	1–4
Ventspils (Latvia)	1–3	(France) Bordeaux	0–1	1–2
Željezničar (Bosnia and Herzegovina)	2–5	(Cyprus) Apollon Limassol	1–2	1–3
Viitorul Constanța (Romania)	3–5	(Netherlands) Vitesse	2–2	1–3
St. Gallen (Switzerland)	2–2 (a)	(Norway) Sarpsborg 08	2–1	0–1
Dynamo Brest (Belarus)	5–4	(Greece) Atromitos	4–3	1–1
Sevilla (Spain)	7–1	(Hungary) Újpest	4–0	3–1
Shakhtyor Soligorsk (Belarus)	2–4	(Poland) Lech Poznań	1–1	1–3 (a.e.t.)
Hibernian (Scotland)	4–3	(Greece) Asteras Tripolis	3–2	1–1
Chikhura Sachkhere (Georgia (country))	0–2	(Slovenia) Maribor	0–0	0–2
Genk (Belgium)	9–1	(Luxembourg) Fola Esch	5–0	4–1
Djurgårdens IF (Sweden)	2–3	(Ukraine) Mariupol	1–1	1–2 (a.e.t.)
Hajduk Split (Croatia)	4–2	(Bulgaria) Slavia Sofia	1–0	3–2

=== Champions Path matches ===
26 July 2018
20:00 (19:00 UTC+1)

The New Saints (Wales)	2–1	(Gibraltar) Lincoln Red Imps
Ebbe 6'; Hudson 83'	Report	Chipolina 31'

Park Hall, Oswestry
Attendance: 632
Referee: Thorvaldur Árnason (Iceland)
2 August 2018
19:00

Lincoln Red Imps (Gibraltar)	1–1	(Wales) The New Saints
Romero 41'	Report	Ebbe 82'

Victoria Stadium, Gibraltar
Attendance: 546
Referee: Petri Viljanen (Finland)

The New Saints won 3–2 on aggregate.

26 July 2018
18:00 (20:00 UTC+4)

Torpedo Kutaisi (Georgia (country))	3–0	(Faroe Islands) Víkingur Gøta
Kapanadze 27'; Kimadze 73'; Kutalia 84'	Report

Ramaz Shengelia Stadium, Kutaisi
Attendance: 4,585
Referee: Artyom Kuchin (Kazakhstan)
2 August 2018
20:00 (19:00 UTC+1)

Víkingur Gøta (Faroe Islands)	0–4	(Georgia (country)) Torpedo Kutaisi
	Report	Lačný 11'; Kobakhidze 24'; Azatskiy 59'; Kapanadze 81'

Svangaskarð, Toftir (Note: Víkingur Gøta played their home match at Svangaskarð, Toftir, instead of their regular stadium Sarpugerði, Norðragøta.)
Attendance: 300
Referee: Simon Lee Evans (Wales)

Torpedo Kutaisi won 7–0 on aggregate.

26 July 2018
19:00

Zrinjski Mostar (Bosnia and Herzegovina)	1–1	(Malta) Valletta
Bilbija 51'	Report	Fontanella 90'

Stadion pod Bijelim Brijegom, Mostar
Attendance: 3,100
Referee: Neil Doyle (Republic of Ireland)
2 August 2018
18:00

Valletta (Malta)	1–2	(Bosnia and Herzegovina) Zrinjski Mostar
Borg 56'	Report	Barišić 31'; Filipović 66'

Centenary Stadium, Ta' Qali
Attendance: 1,310
Referee: Rade Obrenovič (Slovenia)

Zrinjski Mostar won 3–2 on aggregate.

26 July 2018
20:00

FC Santa Coloma (Andorra)	1–0	(Iceland) Valur
Eiríksson 72' (o.g.)	Report

Estadi Comunal, Andorra la Vella
Attendance: 385
Referee: Sebastian Colţescu (Romania)
2 August 2018
22:00 (20:00 UTC+0)

Valur (Iceland)	3–0	(Andorra) FC Santa Coloma
Lárusson 53'; Eiríksson 63'; Adolphsson 90+4'	Report

Hlíðarendi, Reykjavík
Attendance: 825
Referee: Irfan Peljto (Bosnia and Herzegovina)

Valur won 3–1 on aggregate.

26 July 2018
20:00

Sutjeska (Montenegro)	0–1	(Armenia) Alashkert
	Report	Zeljković 11'

Gradski stadion, Nikšić
Attendance: 2,000
Referee: Alain Bieri (Switzerland)
2 August 2018
17:00 (19:00 UTC+4)

Alashkert (Armenia)	0–0	(Montenegro) Sutjeska
	Report

Vazgen Sargsyan Republican Stadium, Yerevan (Note: Alashkert played their home matches at Vazgen Sargsyan Republican Stadium, Yerevan, instead of their regular stadium Alashkert Stadium, Yerevan.)
Attendance: 6,735
Referee: Ivaylo Stoyanov (Bulgaria)

Alashkert won 1–0 on aggregate.

26 July 2018
18:30

F91 Dudelange (Luxembourg)	2–1	(Kosovo) Drita
Perez 66'; Turpel 81' (pen.)	Report	Shabani 45+2'

Stade Jos Nosbaum, Dudelange
Attendance: 737
Referee: Leontios Trattou (Cyprus)
2 August 2018
20:45

Drita (Kosovo)	1–1	(Luxembourg) F91 Dudelange
Limani 26'	Report	Stumpf 46'

Adem Jashari Olympic Stadium, Mitrovica (Note: Drita played their home match at Adem Jashari Olympic Stadium, Mitrovica, instead of their regular stadium Gjilan City Stadium, Gjilan.)
Attendance: 2,200
Referee: Michael Tykgaard (Denmark)

F91 Dudelange won 3–2 on aggregate.

26 July 2018
17:00 (18:00 UTC+3)

Spartaks Jūrmala (Latvia)	6–0	(San Marino) La Fiorita
Kobzar 6', 26'; Maleyev 20'; I. Šlampe 64'; Smith 66'; Stuglis 73'	Report

Slokas Stadium, Jūrmala
Attendance: 648
Referee: Vitali Meshkov (Russia)
2 August 2018
20:45

La Fiorita (San Marino)	0–3	(Latvia) Spartaks Jūrmala
	Report	Smith 26', 65'; Aguirre 45+2'

Stadio Tullo Morgagni, Forlì, Italy
Attendance: 224
Referee: Alan Mario Sant (Malta)

Spartaks Jūrmala won 9–0 on aggregate.

26 July 2018
19:00 (20:00 UTC+3)

APOEL (Cyprus)	5–0	(Estonia) Flora
Tavares 25'; Souza 44'; Morais 47' (pen.); Sallai 73'; Dellatorre 78'	Report

GSP Stadium, Nicosia
Attendance: 9,836
Referee: Marco Fritz (Germany)
2 August 2018
18:00 (19:00 UTC+3)

Flora (Estonia)	2–0	(Cyprus) APOEL
Kams 32'; Poom 37'	Report

A. Le Coq Arena, Tallinn
Attendance: 801
Referee: Amaury Delerue (France)

APOEL won 5–2 on aggregate.

26 July 2018
20:00

Olimpija Ljubljana (Slovenia)	5–1	(Northern Ireland) Crusaders
Boateng 30', 68'; Črnic 56', 75'; Kadrić 90+2'	Report	Ilić 73' (o.g.)

Stožice Stadium, Ljubljana
Attendance: 2,980
Referee: Enea Jorgji (Albania)
2 August 2018
21:00 (20:00 UTC+1)

Crusaders (Northern Ireland)	1–1	(Slovenia) Olimpija Ljubljana
Heatley 41'	Report	Kapun 15'

Seaview, Belfast
Attendance: 1,080
Referee: Oliver Drachta (Austria)

Olimpija Ljubljana won 6–2 on aggregate.

=== Main Path matches ===
26 July 2018
19:00

Molde (Norway)	3–0	(Albania) Laçi
Haaland 6' (pen.); E. Hestad 24'; James 79'	Report

Aker Stadion, Molde
Attendance: 4,179
Referee: Adrien Jaccottet (Switzerland)
2 August 2018
17:00

Laçi (Albania)	0–2	(Norway) Molde
	Report	Aursnes 41' (pen.); Strand 45+1'

Laçi Stadium, Laç
Attendance: 420
Referee: Kristo Tohver (Estonia)

Molde won 5–0 on aggregate.

26 July 2018
20:30

Atalanta (Italy)	2–2	(Bosnia and Herzegovina) Sarajevo
Toloi 11'; Mancini 45+3'	Report	Handžić 67'; Šišić 72'

Mapei Stadium – Città del Tricolore, Reggio Emilia (Note: Atalanta played their home matches at Mapei Stadium – Città del Tricolore, Reggio Emilia, instead of their regular stadium Stadio Atleti Azzurri d'Italia, Bergamo, which wasn't given a UEFA licence to hold games.)
Attendance: 7,518
Referee: Tamás Bognár (Hungary)
2 August 2018
20:15

Sarajevo (Bosnia and Herzegovina)	0–8	(Italy) Atalanta
	Report	Palomino 4'; Gómez 15', 28'; Masiello 18'; Ahmetović 39' (o.g.); Barrow 51', 70', 87'

Asim Ferhatović Hase Stadium, Sarajevo
Attendance: 23,820
Referee: Stuart Attwell (England)

Atalanta won 10–2 on aggregate.

26 July 2018
19:00 (20:00 UTC+3)

Žalgiris (Lithuania)	1–0	(Liechtenstein) Vaduz
Antal 86'	Report

LFF Stadium, Vilnius
Attendance: 3,000
Referee: István Vad (Hungary)
2 August 2018
19:00

Vaduz (Liechtenstein)	1–1	(Lithuania) Žalgiris
Dossou 34'	Report	Šimkovič 66'

Rheinpark Stadion, Vaduz
Attendance: 853
Referee: Anastasios Papapetrou (Greece)

Žalgiris won 2–1 on aggregate.

26 July 2018
17:00 (21:00 UTC+6)

Kairat (Kazakhstan)	2–0	(Netherlands) AZ
Eseola 12', 50'	Report

Almaty Central Stadium, Almaty
Attendance: 20,000
Referee: Aliyar Aghayev (Azerbaijan)
2 August 2018
20:45

AZ (Netherlands)	2–1	(Kazakhstan) Kairat
Til 41'; Koopmeiners 90+4' (pen.)	Report	Islamkhan 28' (pen.)

AFAS Stadion, Alkmaar
Attendance: 9,437
Referee: Dimitar Mečkarovski (Macedonia)

Kairat won 3–2 on aggregate.

26 July 2018
20:45 (19:45 UTC+1)

Aberdeen (Scotland)	1–1	(England) Burnley
Mackay-Steven 19' (pen.)	Report	Vokes 80'

Pittodrie Stadium, Aberdeen
Attendance: 20,313
Referee: Daniel Siebert (Germany)
2 August 2018
20:45 (19:45 UTC+1)

Burnley (England)	3–1 (a.e.t.)	(Scotland) Aberdeen
Wood 6'; Cork 102'; Barnes 114' (pen.)	Report	Ferguson 27'

Turf Moor, Burnley
Attendance: 17,404
Referee: Massimiliano Irrati (Italy)

Burnley won 4–2 on aggregate.

26 July 2018
20:30

Partizan (Serbia)	1–0	(Lithuania) Trakai
Januševskij 57' (o.g.)	Report

Partizan Stadium, Belgrade
Attendance: 6,210
Referee: Georgi Kabakov (Bulgaria)
2 August 2018
18:00 (19:00 UTC+3)

Trakai (Lithuania)	1–1	(Serbia) Partizan
Osipov 9'	Report	N. R. Miletić 45+3'

LFF Stadium, Vilnius
Attendance: 1,980
Referee: Stephan Klossner (Switzerland)

Partizan won 2–1 on aggregate.

26 July 2018
18:00

Balzan (Malta)	2–1	(Slovakia) Slovan Bratislava
Kaljević 17'; Ljubomirac 67'	Report	Savićević 74'

Centenary Stadium, Ta' Qali
Attendance: 558
Referee: Jens Maae (Denmark)
2 August 2018
19:30

Slovan Bratislava (Slovakia)	3–1	(Malta) Balzan
Čavrić 7'; Šporar 70', 71'	Report	Cadú 77'

Štadión Pasienky, Bratislava
Attendance: 4,176
Referee: Alexandre Boucaut (Belgium)

Slovan Bratislava won 4–3 on aggregate.

26 July 2018
19:45

Nordsjælland (Denmark)	1–0	(Sweden) AIK
Andersen 11'	Report

Farum Park, Farum
Attendance: 3,474
Referee: Sébastien Delferiere (Belgium)
2 August 2018
19:00

AIK (Sweden)	0–1	(Denmark) Nordsjælland
	Report	Olsen 29'

Tele2 Arena, Stockholm
Attendance: 10,946
Referee: Jérôme Brisard (France)

Nordsjælland won 2–0 on aggregate.

26 July 2018
17:30

Rudar Velenje (Slovenia)	0–2	(Romania) FCSB
	Report	Man 5'; Teixeira 74'

Ob Jezeru City Stadium, Velenje
Attendance: 450
Referee: Hüseyin Göçek (Turkey)
2 August 2018
20:30 (21:30 UTC+3)

FCSB (Romania)	4–0	(Slovenia) Rudar Velenje
Tănase 22' (pen.); Moruțan 49'; Coman 68'; Benzar 90+3'	Report

Arena Națională, Bucharest
Attendance: 7,030
Referee: Sergey Ivanov (Russia)

FCSB won 6–0 on aggregate.

26 July 2018
18:00 (19:00 UTC+3)

Hapoel Haifa (Israel)	1–1	(Iceland) FH
Papazoglou 65'	Report	Gomes 53'

Sammy Ofer Stadium, Haifa
Attendance: 3,950
Referee: Srđan Jovanović (Serbia)
2 August 2018
21:15 (19:15 UTC+0)

FH (Iceland)	0–1	(Israel) Hapoel Haifa
	Report	Elbaz 68'

Kaplakriki, Hafnarfjörður
Attendance: 1,136
Referee: Sergey Tsinkevich (Belarus)

Hapoel Haifa won 2–1 on aggregate.

26 July 2018
20:45 (19:45 UTC+1)

Dundalk (Republic of Ireland)	0–0	(Cyprus) AEK Larnaca
	Report

Oriel Park, Dundalk
Attendance: 3,000
Referee: Harald Lechner (Austria)
2 August 2018
17:30 (18:30 UTC+3)

AEK Larnaca (Cyprus)	4–0	(Republic of Ireland) Dundalk
Tričkovski 13', 38'; Tete 21'; Tomàs 87'	Report

AEK Arena – Georgios Karapatakis, Larnaca
Attendance: 3,991
Referee: Fran Jović (Croatia)

AEK Larnaca won 4–0 on aggregate.

26 July 2018
20:00

Górnik Zabrze (Poland)	0–1	(Slovakia) Trenčín
	Report	Azango 39'

Ernest Pohl Stadium, Zabrze
Attendance: 12,859
Referee: Mattias Gestranius (Finland)
2 August 2018
17:30

Trenčín (Slovakia)	4–1	(Poland) Górnik Zabrze
Angulo 10' (o.g.); Čataković 20', 90'; Azango 59'	Report	Smuga 60'

Stadium Myjava, Myjava
Attendance: 1,897
Referee: Ole Hobber Nilsen (Norway)

Trenčín won 5–1 on aggregate.

26 July 2018
19:00 (20:00 UTC+3)

Maccabi Tel Aviv (Israel)	2–0	(Serbia) Radnički Niš
Kjartansson 51', 69' (pen.)	Report

Netanya Stadium, Netanya
Attendance: 8,161
Referee: Paolo Mazzoleni (Italy)
2 August 2018
21:00

Radnički Niš (Serbia)	2–2	(Israel) Maccabi Tel Aviv
Stanisavljević 44', 58'	Report	Pankov 33' (o.g.); Atar 38'

Čair Stadium, Niš
Attendance: 7,588
Referee: Radu Petrescu (Romania)

Maccabi Tel Aviv won 4–2 on aggregate.

26 July 2018
19:00 (20:00 UTC+3)

CSKA Sofia (Bulgaria)	3–0	(Austria) Flyeralarm Admira
Despodov 29', 34'; Maurides 38' (pen.)	Report

Balgarska Armia Stadium, Sofia
Attendance: 6,200
Referee: John Beaton (Scotland)
2 August 2018
19:00

Flyeralarm Admira (Austria)	1–3	(Bulgaria) CSKA Sofia
Bakış 55'	Report	Maurides 14', 53'; Jorginho 80'

Bundesstadion Südstadt, Maria Enzersdorf
Attendance: 2,400
Referee: Pol van Boekel (Netherlands)

CSKA Sofia won 6–1 on aggregate.

26 July 2018
20:45

Spartak Subotica (Serbia)	2–0	(Czech Republic) Sparta Prague
Ćalasan 8'; Đuričin 57'	Report

Karađorđe Stadium, Novi Sad
Attendance: 4,000
Referee: Paweł Raczkowski (Poland)
2 August 2018
19:00

Sparta Prague (Czech Republic)	2–1	(Serbia) Spartak Subotica
Šural 28'; Plavšić 66'	Report	Čečarić 75' (pen.)

Generali Arena, Prague
Attendance: 12,068
Referee: Sebastian Colțescu (Romania)

Spartak Subotica won 3–2 on aggregate.

26 July 2018
18:30

RB Leipzig (Germany)	4–0	(Sweden) BK Häcken
Bruma 35'; Cunha 39'; Kampl 50'; Augustin 84'	Report

Red Bull Arena, Leipzig
Attendance: 18,126
Referee: Aleksandar Stavrev (Macedonia)
2 August 2018
18:30

BK Häcken (Sweden)	1–1	(Germany) RB Leipzig
Irandust 85'	Report	Bruno 47'

Bravida Arena, Gothenburg
Attendance: 2,968
Referee: Mete Kalkavan (Turkey)

RB Leipzig won 5–1 on aggregate.

26 July 2018
21:00 (19:00 UTC+0)

Stjarnan (Iceland)	0–2	(Denmark) Copenhagen
	Report	Kodro 52'; Fischer 58'

Stjörnuvöllur, Garðabær
Attendance: 1,050
Referee: Robert Schörgenhofer (Austria)
2 August 2018
20:00

Copenhagen (Denmark)	5–0	(Iceland) Stjarnan
Fischer 4'; Holse 24'; Kodro 39', 47', 74'	Report

Parken Stadium, Copenhagen
Attendance: 8,726
Referee: Paul Tierney (England)

Copenhagen won 7–0 on aggregate.

26 July 2018
16:00 (19:00 UTC+5)

Ufa (Russia)	0–0	(Slovenia) Domžale
	Report

Neftyanik Stadium, Ufa
Attendance: 11,210
Referee: Donatas Rumšas (Lithuania)
2 August 2018
20:30

Domžale (Slovenia)	1–1	(Russia) Ufa
Bizjak 50'	Report	Jokić 87'

Domžale Sports Park, Domžale
Attendance: 2,500
Referee: Arnold Hunter (Northern Ireland)

1–1 on aggregate; Ufa won on away goals.

26 July 2018
17:00 (21:00 UTC+6)

Tobol (Kazakhstan)	2–1	(Armenia) Pyunik
Fedin 49'; Nurgaliev 80'	Report	Koryan 90'

Kostanay Central Stadium, Kostanay
Attendance: 7,700
Referee: Juri Frischer (Estonia)
31 July 2018
18:00 (20:00 UTC+4)

Pyunik (Armenia)	1–0	(Kazakhstan) Tobol
Konaté 82'	Report

Vazgen Sargsyan Republican Stadium, Yerevan
Attendance: 8,000
Referee: Petr Ardeleánu (Czech Republic)

2–2 on aggregate; Pyunik won on away goals.

26 July 2018
19:20

Jagiellonia Białystok (Poland)	1–0	(Portugal) Rio Ave
Machaj 9'	Report

Białystok City Stadium, Białystok
Attendance: 13,725
Referee: Ricardo de Burgos Bengoetxea (Spain)
2 August 2018
21:00 (20:00 UTC+1)

Rio Ave (Portugal)	4–4	(Poland) Jagiellonia Białystok
Galeno 27', 45+2'; Gelson 63'; Furtado 84'	Report	Sheridan 6'; Romanczuk 56', 79'; Pospíšil 72'

Estádio dos Arcos, Vila do Conde
Attendance: 5,930
Referee: Marco Di Bello (Italy)

Jagiellonia Białystok won 5–4 on aggregate.

26 July 2018
19:45

LASK (Austria)	4–0	(Norway) Lillestrøm
Goiginger 6', 70'; Holland 45+1'; Frieser 90+1'	Report

Linzer Stadion, Linz
Attendance: 8,304
Referee: Aleksei Eskov (Russia)
2 August 2018
18:30

Lillestrøm (Norway)	1–2	(Austria) LASK
Olsen 79'	Report	Goiginger 35'; Tetteh 65'

Åråsen Stadion, Lillestrøm
Attendance: 1,975
Referee: Vilhjálmur Thórarinsson (Iceland)

LASK won 6–1 on aggregate.

26 July 2018
19:00

Honvéd (Hungary)	1–0	(Luxembourg) Progrès Niederkorn
Baráth 82'	Report

Bozsik József Stadion, Budapest
Attendance: 2,447
Referee: Mohammed Al-Hakim (Sweden)
2 August 2018
19:00

Progrès Niederkorn (Luxembourg)	2–0	(Hungary) Honvéd
De Almeida 21'; Matias 84'	Report

Stade Municipal, Differdange
Attendance: 1,852
Referee: Karim Abed (France)

Progrès Niederkorn won 2–1 on aggregate.

26 July 2018
20:45

Osijek (Croatia)	0–1	(Scotland) Rangers
	Report	Morelos 18'

Stadion Gradski vrt, Osijek
Attendance: 7,112
Referee: Paweł Gil (Poland)
2 August 2018
20:45 (19:45 UTC+1)

Rangers (Scotland)	1–1	(Croatia) Osijek
Katić 53'	Report	Goldson 89' (o.g.)

Ibrox Stadium, Glasgow
Attendance: 48,202
Referee: Dennis Higler (Netherlands)

Rangers won 2–1 on aggregate.

26 July 2018
20:00 (19:00 UTC+1)

B36 (Faroe Islands)	0–2	(Turkey) Beşiktaş
	Report	Lens 8'; Gönül 26'

Gundadalur, Tórshavn
Attendance: 1,634
Referee: Ievgenii Aranovskyi (Ukraine)
2 August 2018
20:00 (21:00 UTC+3)

Beşiktaş (Turkey)	6–0	(Faroe Islands) B36
Larin 31', 61', 79'; Erkin 43'; Özyakup 74'; Love 90+3' (pen.)	Report

Vodafone Park, Istanbul
Attendance: 23,929
Referee: Carlos Xistra (Portugal)

Beşiktaş won 8–0 on aggregate.

26 July 2018
21:00

DAC Dunajská Streda (Slovakia)	1–3	(Belarus) Dinamo Minsk
Pačinda 45' (pen.)	Report	Begunov 24'; Makas 77'; Nikolić 90+4'

MOL Aréna, Dunajská Streda
Attendance: 9,227
Referee: Serhiy Boyko (Ukraine)
2 August 2018
18:00 (19:00 UTC+3)

Dinamo Minsk (Belarus)	4–1	(Slovakia) DAC Dunajská Streda
Nikolić 19', 58'; Khvashchynski 47'; Ivanow 51' (pen.)	Report	Vida 73'

Dinamo Stadium, Minsk
Attendance: 9,450
Referee: Antti Munukka (Finland)

Dinamo Minsk won 7–2 on aggregate.

26 July 2018
16:45 (17:45 UTC+3)

Ventspils (Latvia)	0–1	(France) Bordeaux
	Report	Youssouf 3'

Ventspils Olimpiskais Stadions, Ventspils
Attendance: 3,055
Referee: Sergey Lapochkin (Russia)
2 August 2018
20:45

Bordeaux (France)	2–1	(Latvia) Ventspils
Kamano 9'; Koundé 48'	Report	Akinyemi 66'

Nouveau Stade de Bordeaux, Bordeaux
Attendance: 15,863
Referee: Hugo Miguel (Portugal)

Bordeaux won 3–1 on aggregate.

26 July 2018
20:30

Željezničar (Bosnia and Herzegovina)	1–2	(Cyprus) Apollon Limassol
Krpić 90'	Report	Bogičević 23' (o.g.); Sachetti 79'

Stadion Grbavica, Sarajevo
Attendance: 11,821
Referee: Alexander Harkam (Austria)
2 August 2018
19:00 (20:00 UTC+3)

Apollon Limassol (Cyprus)	3–1	(Bosnia and Herzegovina) Željezničar
Papoulis 2', 57' (pen.), 90'	Report	Zec 43'

GSP Stadium, Nicosia
Attendance: 3,400
Referee: Nikola Popov (Bulgaria)

Apollon Limassol won 5–2 on aggregate.

26 July 2018
17:00 (18:00 UTC+3)

Viitorul Constanța (Romania)	2–2	(Netherlands) Vitesse
Drăguș 44', 49'	Report	Matavž 54'; Linssen 72'

Stadionul Viitorul, Ovidiu
Attendance: 2,543
Referee: Davide Massa (Italy)
2 August 2018
20:00

Vitesse (Netherlands)	3–1	(Romania) Viitorul Constanța
Matavž 23'; Linssen 48'; Beerens 77'	Report	Drăguș 50'

GelreDome, Arnhem
Attendance: 9,876
Referee: Kevin Clancy (Scotland)

Vitesse won 5–3 on aggregate.

26 July 2018
20:15

St. Gallen (Switzerland)	2–1	(Norway) Sarpsborg 08
Hefti 41'; Buess 66'	Report	Heintz 6'

Kybunpark, St. Gallen
Attendance: 6,335
Referee: Fábio Veríssimo (Portugal)
2 August 2018
20:45

Sarpsborg 08 (Norway)	1–0	(Switzerland) St. Gallen
Mortensen 31'	Report

Sarpsborg Stadion, Sarpsborg
Attendance: 5,460
Referee: Frank Schneider (France)

2–2 on aggregate; Sarpsborg 08 won on away goals.

26 July 2018
19:45 (20:45 UTC+3)

Dynamo Brest (Belarus)	4–3	(Greece) Atromitos
Filipović 5'; Savitski 13' (pen.), 61', 70'	Report	Manousos 74'; Veratsila 80' (o.g.); Koulouris 88'

Regional Sport Complex Brestsky, Brest
Attendance: 9,530
Referee: José María Sánchez Martínez (Spain)
2 August 2018
19:15 (20:15 UTC+3)

Atromitos (Greece)	1–1	(Belarus) Dynamo Brest
Manousos 80'	Report	Nyakhaychyk 90+5'

Peristeri Stadium, Peristeri
Attendance: 2,420
Referee: Eitan Shemeulevitch (Israel)

Dynamo Brest won 5–4 on aggregate.

26 July 2018
21:45

Sevilla (Spain)	4–0	(Hungary) Újpest
Navas 7'; Ben Yedder 32' (pen.); Sarabia 43'; Vázquez 90+2'	Report

Ramón Sánchez Pizjuán, Seville
Attendance: 29,671
Referee: Andris Treimanis (Latvia)
2 August 2018
21:00

Újpest (Hungary)	1–3	(Spain) Sevilla
Zsótér 77'	Report	Sarabia 36', 50'; Muriel 83'

Szusza Ferenc stadion, Budapest
Attendance: 9,750
Referee: Kirill Levnikov (Russia)

Sevilla won 7–1 on aggregate.

26 July 2018
19:30 (20:30 UTC+3)

Shakhtyor Soligorsk (Belarus)	1–1	(Poland) Lech Poznań
Bakaj 53'	Report	Amaral 89'

Stroitel Stadium, Salihorsk
Attendance: 3,700
Referee: Svein Oddvar Moen (Norway)
2 August 2018
20:45

Lech Poznań (Poland)	3–1 (a.e.t.)	(Belarus) Shakhtyor Soligorsk
Gytkjær 15', 94', 118'	Report	Laptsew 79'

Stadion Miejski, Poznań
Attendance: 16,507
Referee: Christian Dingert (Germany)

Lech Poznań won 4–2 on aggregate.

26 July 2018
20:45 (19:45 UTC+1)

Hibernian (Scotland)	3–2	(Greece) Asteras Tripolis
Ambrose 64'; Gray 77'; Kamberi 90+3'	Report	Kyriakopoulos 12', 35'

Easter Road, Edinburgh
Attendance: 14,148
Referee: Andreas Ekberg (Sweden)
2 August 2018
20:00 (21:00 UTC+3)

Asteras Tripolis (Greece)	1–1	(Scotland) Hibernian
Tsilianidis 56'	Report	McGinn 44'

Theodoros Kolokotronis Stadium, Tripoli
Attendance: 3,870
Referee: Benoît Millot (France)

Hibernian won 4–3 on aggregate.

26 July 2018
18:00 (20:00 UTC+4)

Chikhura Sachkhere (Georgia (country))	0–0	(Slovenia) Maribor
	Report

Mikheil Meskhi Stadium, Tbilisi
Attendance: 3,500
Referee: Kevin Blom (Netherlands)
2 August 2018
20:15

Maribor (Slovenia)	2–0	(Georgia (country)) Chikhura Sachkhere
Zahović 70'; Tavares 90+6'	Report

Ljudski vrt, Maribor
Attendance: 7,166
Referee: Halil Umut Meler (Turkey)

Maribor won 2–0 on aggregate.

26 July 2018
20:00

Genk (Belgium)	5–0	(Luxembourg) Fola Esch
Malinovskyi 4'; Pozuelo 19'; Trossard 25', 73' (pen.); Dewaest 28'	Report

Luminus Arena, Genk
Attendance: 10,300
Referee: Martin Strömbergsson (Sweden)
1 August 2018
18:00

Fola Esch (Luxembourg)	1–4	(Belgium) Genk
Bensi 61'	Report	Zhegrova 13', 63'; Heynen 16'; Gano 59'

Stade Émile Mayrisch, Esch-sur-Alzette
Attendance: 1,550
Referee: Filip Glova (Slovakia)

Genk won 9–1 on aggregate.

26 July 2018
19:00

Djurgårdens IF (Sweden)	1–1	(Ukraine) Mariupol
Badji 90+4'	Report	Yavorskyi 37'

Tele2 Arena, Stockholm
Attendance: 11,200
Referee: Miroslav Zelinka (Czech Republic)
2 August 2018
19:00 (20:00 UTC+3)

Mariupol (Ukraine)	2–1 (a.e.t.)	(Sweden) Djurgårdens IF
Pikhalyonok 63'; Fomin 97' (pen.)	Report	Badji 77'

Chornomorets Stadium, Odesa (Note: Mariupol played their home matches at Chornomorets Stadium, Odesa, instead of their regular stadium Volodymyr Boiko Stadium, Mariupol, due to the war conditions in Eastern Ukraine.)
Attendance: 5,077
Referee: Rob Harvey (Republic of Ireland)

Mariupol won 3–2 on aggregate.

26 July 2018
20:00

Hajduk Split (Croatia)	1–0	(Bulgaria) Slavia Sofia
Said 79'	Report

Stadion Poljud, Split
Attendance: 26,103
Referee: István Kovács (Romania)
2 August 2018
18:00 (19:00 UTC+3)

Slavia Sofia (Bulgaria)	2–3	(Croatia) Hajduk Split
Ivanov 45' (pen.); Yomov 70'	Report	Jurić 25'; Caktaš 55' (pen.), 87'

Vasil Levski National Stadium, Sofia
Attendance: 2,100
Referee: Daniele Doveri (Italy)

Hajduk Split won 4–2 on aggregate.
