= Bojan Čečarić =

Serbian footballer

Personal information
- Date of birth: 10 October 1993 (age 33)
- Place of birth: Nova Pazova, FR Yugoslavia
- Height: 1.90 m (6 ft 3 in)
- Position: Forward

Team information
- Current team: Jedinstvo Stara Pazova

Senior career*
Years	Team	Apps	(Gls)
2010–2013	Radnički Nova Pazova	42	(5)
2013–2015	Javor Ivanjica	43	(4)
2016–2017	Mladost Lučani	12	(1)
2016	→ Novi Pazar (loan)	17	(0)
2017–2019	Spartak Subotica	49	(9)
2019–2021	Cracovia	12	(0)
2019–2020	Cracovia II	7	(2)
2020	→ Korona Kielce (loan)	7	(0)
2021	Napredak Kruševac	16	(1)
2021–2022	Novi Pazar	25	(3)
2022–2023	Napredak Kruševac	32	(2)
2023–2024	Mladost Novi Sad	22	(4)
2024–2025	Javor Ivanjica	22	(0)
2025–2026	Kabel	14	(0)
2026–	Jedinstvo Stara Pazova	0	(0)
- * Club domestic league appearances and goals as of 22:50, 15 March 2026 (UTC)

Bojan Čečarić (Serbian Cyrillic: Бојан Чечарић; born 10 October 1993) is a Serbian professional footballer who plays as a forward for Serbian League Vojvodina club Jedinstvo Stara Pazova.

== Club career ==
In the 2019–20 season, he started playing for Cracovia.

== Honours ==
Cracovia

- Polish Cup: 2019–20
