= 2021–22 Torino FC season =

Torino
2021–22 season
- Chairman: Urbano Cairo
- Head coach: Ivan Jurić
- Stadium: Stadio Olimpico Grande Torino
- Serie A: 10th
- Coppa Italia: Second round
- Top goalscorer: League: Andrea Belotti (8); All: Andrea Belotti (8)
Home colours	Away colours	Third colours

The 2021–22 season was the 111th season in the existence of Torino FC and the club's 10th consecutive season in the top flight of Italian football. In addition to the domestic league, Torino participated in this season's edition of the Coppa Italia.

== Players ==
=== First-team squad ===
As of 31 January 2022

Note: Flags indicate national team as defined under FIFA eligibility rules; some limited exceptions apply. Players may hold more than one non-FIFA nationality.

No.	Pos.	Nation	Player
1	GK	ALB	Etrit Berisha
3	DF	BRA	Bremer (4th captain)
4	MF	ITA	Tommaso Pobega (on loan from Milan)
5	DF	ITA	Armando Izzo
6	DF	CZE	David Zima
7	FW	ITA	Simone Zaza
9	FW	ITA	Andrea Belotti (captain)
10	MF	SRB	Saša Lukić
11	FW	CRO	Marko Pjaca (on loan from Juventus)
13	DF	SUI	Ricardo Rodriguez
14	MF	CRO	Josip Brekalo (on loan from VfL Wolfsburg)
15	DF	ARG	Cristian Ansaldi (vice-captain)
17	DF	CIV	Wilfried Singo
19	FW	PAR	Antonio Sanabria
20	FW	ITA	Simone Edera

No.	Pos.	Nation	Player
22	MF	BEL	Dennis Praet (on loan from Leicester City)
23	MF	SEN	Demba Seck
26	DF	CIV	Koffi Djidji
27	DF	KOS	Mërgim Vojvoda
28	MF	ITA	Samuele Ricci (on loan from Empoli)
32	GK	SRB	Vanja Milinković-Savić
34	DF	NGR	Ola Aina
38	MF	ITA	Rolando Mandragora (3rd captain, on loan from Juventus)
64	FW	ITA	Pietro Pellegri (on loan from Monaco)
70	MF	DEN	Magnus Warming
77	MF	POL	Karol Linetty
89	GK	ITA	Luca Gemello
93	MF	ALG	Mohamed Farès (on loan from Lazio)
99	DF	ITA	Alessandro Buongiorno

=== Out on loan ===
As of 9 February 2022

Note: Flags indicate national team as defined under FIFA eligibility rules; some limited exceptions apply. Players may hold more than one non-FIFA nationality.

No.	Pos.	Nation	Player
—	DF	ITA	Christian Celesia (at Paganese until 30 June 2022)
—	MF	FRA	Ndary Adopo (at Viterbese until 30 June 2022)
—	MF	HUN	Krisztofer Horváth (at Szeged-Csanád until 30 June 2022)
—	MF	FRA	Ibrahim Karamoko (at R.E. Virton until 30 June 2022)
—	MF	KOS	Altin Kryeziu (at Tabor Sežana until 30 June 2022)
—	MF	CIV	Ben Lhassine Kone (at Crotone until 30 June 2022)

No.	Pos.	Nation	Player
—	MF	VEN	Tomás Rincón (at Sampdoria until 30 June 2022)
—	MF	ITA	Jacopo Segre (at Perugia until 30 June 2022)
—	FW	ITA	Vincenzo Millico (at Cosenza until 30 June 2022)
—	FW	ITA	Nicola Rauti (at Pescara until 30 June 2022)
—	FW	ITA	Simone Verdi (at Salernitana until 30 June 2022)

== Transfers ==
Date	Name	Moving from	Moving to	Fee
13 May 2021	(Argentina) Lucas Boyé	Torino	(Spain) Elche	Undisclosed (Note: The player already played for his new club in the 2020–21 season, the deal turned from temporary to definitive.)
3 July 2021	(Albania) Etrit Berisha	S.P.A.L.	Torino	Free
3 July 2021	Giacomo Zanotel	Pordenone	Torino	Free
4 July 2021	Jean Freddi Greco	Torino	Pordenone	Undisclosed
9 July 2021	(Denmark) Magnus Warming	(Denmark) Lyngby Boldklub	Torino	Undisclosed
23 July 2021	(France) Soualiho Meïté	Torino	(Portugal) Benfica	Undisclosed
28 July 2021	(Croatia) Marko Pjaca	Juventus	Torino	Loan
3 August 2021	Salvatore Sirigu	Torino	Genoa	Free
17 August 2021	Christian Celesia	Torino	Alessandria	Loan
19 August 2021	(Sweden) Elvis Lindqvist	Internazionale	Torino	Loan
25 August 2021	(Brazil) Lyanco	Torino	(England) Southampton	Undisclosed
27 August 2021	Tommaso Pobega	Milan	Torino	Loan
31 August 2021	Vincenzo Millico	Torino	Cosenza	Loan
31 August 2021	(Kosovo) Samir Ujkani	Torino	Empoli	Free
31 August 2021	Nicola Rauti	Torino	Pescara	Loan
31 August 2021	Jacopo Segre	Torino	Perugia	Loan
31 August 2021	(Czech Republic) David Zima	(Czech Republic) Slavia Prague	Torino	Undisclosed
31 August 2021	(Belgium) Dennis Praet	(England) Leicester City	Torino	Loan
31 August 2021	(Croatia) Josip Brekalo	(Germany) VfL Wolfsburg	Torino	Loan

== Pre-season and friendlies ==
Win Draw Loss Fixtures

18 July 2021 Friendly	Torino (Italy)	11–0	(Italy) FC Obermais	Turin, Italy
17:00 CEST (UTC+2)	Sanabria 13'; Millico 15', 42'; Aina 19'; Zaza 51', 66'; Djidji 53'; Rincón 60'; Warming 75'; Rauti 77'; Ansaldi 86'	Report		Stadium: Stadio Olimpico Grande Torino; Attendance: 0

24 July 2021 Friendly	Torino (Italy)	Cancelled	(Germany) VfL Bochum	Brixen, Italy
17:00 CEST (UTC+2)				Stadium: Sportplatz Klaus Seebacher

27 July 2021 Friendly	Torino (Italy)	0–0	(Saudi Arabia) Al-Fateh	Brixen, Italy
17:00 CEST (UTC+2)		Report		Stadium: Sportplatz Klaus Seebacher

31 July 2021 Friendly	Rennes (France)	1–0	(Italy) Torino	Rennes, France
18:00 CEST (UTC+2)	Terrier 27'; Ugochukwu (yellow card) 65'	Report	Linetty (yellow card) 45+1'; Pjaca (yellow card) 59'	Stadium: Roazhon Park; Attendance: 11,000

8 August 2021 Friendly	AZ (Netherlands)	2–1	(Italy) Torino	Alkmaar, Netherlands
16:00 CEST (UTC+2)	Karlsson 14'; Pavlidis 86'	Report	Pjaca 1'	Stadium: AFAS Stadion

== Competitions ==
=== Overall record ===
Competition	First match	Last match	Starting round	Final position	Record							
Competition	First match	Last match	Starting round	Final position	Pld	W	D	L	GF	GA	GD	Win %
Serie A	21 August 2021	20 May 2022	Matchday 1	10th	38	13	11	14	46	41	+5	34.21
Coppa Italia	15 August 2021	16 December 2021	First round	Second round	2	0	1	1	1	2	−1	0.00
Total					40	13	12	15	47	43	+4	32.50

Source: Soccerway

=== Serie A ===
==== League table ====
Pos	Team	Pld	W	D	L	GF	GA	GD	Pts
8	Atalanta	38	16	11	11	65	48	+17	59
9	Hellas Verona	38	14	11	13	65	59	+6	53
10	Torino	38	13	11	14	46	41	+5	50 (Note: Torino finished ahead of Sassuolo on head-to-head points: Sassuolo 0–1 Torino, Torino 1–1 Sassuolo.)
11	Sassuolo	38	13	11	14	64	66	−2	50
12	Udinese	38	11	14	13	61	58	+3	47

Source: Serie A
Rules for classification: 1) Points; 2) Head-to-head points; 3) Head-to-head goal difference; 4) Goal difference; 5) Goals scored; 6) Draw. (Note: Head-to-head record is used only after all the matches between the teams in question have been played)

==== Results summary ====
Overall								Home						Away					
Pld	W	D	L	GF	GA	GD	Pts	W	D	L	GF	GA	GD	W	D	L	GF	GA	GD
38	13	11	14	46	41	+5	50	8	5	6	29	21	+8	5	6	8	17	20	−3

Source: Serie A

==== Results by round ====
Round	1	2	3	4	5	6	7	8	9	10	11	12	13	14	15	16	17	18	19	20	21	22	23	24	25	26	27	28	29	30	31	32	33	34	35	36	37	38
Ground	H	A	H	A	H	A	H	A	H	A	H	A	H	A	H	A	H	H	A	A	H	A	H	A	H	A	H	A	H	A	A	H	A	H	A	H	A	H
Result	L	L	W	W	D	D	L	L	W	L	W	L	W	L	D	D	W	W	L	D	W	W	D	L	L	D	L	D	D	L	W	D	D	W	W	L	W	L
Position	15	16	11	10	9	9	11	12	12	13	12	12	11	13	13	13	13	10	11	12	9	9	10	10	10	10	11	11	11	11	11	11	11	11	10	10	10	10

Source: Serie A
A = Away; H = Home; W = Win; D = Draw; L = Loss

==== Matches ====
The league fixtures were announced on 14 July 2021.

21 August 2021 1	Torino	1–2	Atalanta	Turin
20:45 CEST (UTC+2)	Rincón (yellow card) 52'; Bremer (yellow card) 71'; Belotti 79'	Report	Muriel 6'; Demiral (yellow card) 23'; Musso (yellow card) 82'; Piccoli 90+3'	Stadium: Stadio Olimpico Grande Torino; Attendance: 3,475; Referee: Daniele Chiffi

28 August 2021 2	Fiorentina	2–1	Torino	Florence
20:45 CEST (UTC+2)	Castrovilli (yellow card) 22'; Milenković (yellow card) 38'; González 41'; Bonaventura (yellow card) 48'; Vlahović (yellow card) 65', (goal) 70'	Report	Djidji (yellow card) 39'; Mandragora (yellow card) 45'; Buongiorno (yellow card) 65'; Aina (yellow card) 80'; Lukić (yellow card) 83'; Verdi 89'	Stadium: Stadio Artemio Franchi; Attendance: 12,592; Referee: Maurizio Mariani

12 September 2021 3	Torino	4–0	Salernitana	Turin
15:00 CEST (UTC+2)	Sanabria 45'; Bremer 65'; Pobega 87'; Lukić 90+1'	Report	Bonazzoli (yellow card) 42'; Gyömbér (yellow card) 63'	Stadium: Stadio Olimpico Grande Torino; Attendance: 9,082; Referee: Gianluca Aureliano

17 September 2021 4	Sassuolo	0–1	Torino	Reggio Emilia
20:45 CEST (UTC+2)		Report	Bremer (yellow card) 12'; Aina (yellow card) 35'; Rodriguez (yellow card) 54'; Pjaca 83'; Djidji (yellow card) 90+5'	Stadium: Mapei Stadium – Città del Tricolore; Attendance: 4,090; Referee: Marco Piccinini

23 September 2021 5	Torino	1–1	Lazio	Turin
18:30 CEST (UTC+2)	Mandragora (yellow card) 17'; Aina (yellow card) 31'; Brekalo (yellow card) 37'; Pjaca 76'	Report	Marušić (yellow card) 45+1'; Milinković-Savić (yellow card) 59'; Luiz Felipe (yellow card) 65'; Immobile 90+1' (pen.)	Stadium: Stadio Olimpico Grande Torino; Attendance: 8,646; Referee: Rosario Abisso

27 September 2021 6	Venezia	1–1	Torino	Ferrara
20:45 CEST (UTC+2)	Ampadu (yellow card) 59'; Aramu 79' (pen.)	Report	Pobega (yellow card) 43'; Brekalo 56'; Milinković-Savić (yellow card) 59'; Djidji (yellow card) 74' (yellow-red card) 78'	Stadium: Stadio Paolo Mazza; Attendance: 4,888; Referee: Lorenzo Maggioni

2 October 2021 7	Torino	0–1	Juventus	Turin
18:00 CEST (UTC+2)	Sanabria (yellow card) 56'; Lukić (yellow card) 62'; Mandragora (yellow card) 65'	Report	Chiellini (yellow card) 82'; Locatelli 86'	Stadium: Stadio Olimpico Grande Torino; Attendance: 12,073; Referee: Paolo Valeri

17 October 2021 8	Napoli	1–0	Torino	Naples
18:00 CEST (UTC+2)	Insigne (penalty missed) 27'; Koulibaly (yellow card) 79'; Osimhen 81'; Zambo Anguissa (yellow card) 85'	Report	Rodriguez (yellow card) 37'; Linetty (yellow card) 56'; Pobega (yellow card) 75'; Milinković-Savić (yellow card) 90+7'	Stadium: Stadio San Paolo; Attendance: 27,579; Referee: Juan Luca Sacchi

22 October 2021 9	Torino	3–2	Genoa	Turin
18:30 CEST (UTC+2)	Sanabria 14'; Pobega 31', (yellow card) 88'; Brekalo 77'; Praet (yellow card) 90+3'	Report	Vásquez (yellow card) 64'; Destro 70'; Farès (yellow card) 78'; Caicedo 81'; Kallon (yellow card) 85'	Stadium: Stadio Olimpico Grande Torino; Attendance: 9,881; Referee: Piero Giacomelli

26 October 2021 10	Milan	1–0	Torino	Milan
20:45 CEST (UTC+2)	Romagnoli (yellow card) 10'; Giroud 14'; Kalulu (yellow card) 34'; Bakayoko (yellow card) 90+3'	Report	Buongiorno (yellow card) 5'; Singo (yellow card) 24'; Pobega (yellow card) 57'	Stadium: San Siro; Attendance: 35,929; Referee: Gianluca Aureliano

30 October 2021 11	Torino	3–0	Sampdoria	Turin
20:45 CEST (UTC+2)	Praet 17'; Bremer (yellow card) 29'; Pobega (yellow card) 50'; Singo 52'; Belotti 90+3'	Report	Drăgușin (yellow card) 55'; Silva (red card) 67'; Askildsen (yellow card) 75'; Chabot (yellow card) 81'; Candreva (yellow card) 84'	Stadium: Stadio Olimpico Grande Torino; Attendance: 13,137; Referee: Francesco Fourneau

6 November 2021 12	Spezia	1–0	Torino	La Spezia
15:00 CET (UTC+1)	Sala 58'; Amian (yellow card) 65'; Nikolaou (yellow card) 76'; Kovalenko (yellow card) 89'	Report	Rincón (yellow card) 38'; Linetty (yellow card) 53'; Sanabria (yellow card) 76'	Stadium: Stadio Alberto Picco; Attendance: 6,953; Referee: Daniele Orsato

22 November 2021 13	Torino	2–1	Udinese	Turin
20:45 CET (UTC+1)	Brekalo 8'; Bremer 48'; Zaza (yellow card) 90+2'	Report	Molina (yellow card) 16'; Pereyra (yellow card) 57'; Walace (yellow card) 68'; Forestieri 77'	Stadium: Stadio Olimpico Grande Torino; Attendance: 7,034; Referee: Ivano Pezzuto

28 November 2021 14	Roma	1–0	Torino	Rome
18:00 CET (UTC+1)	Abraham 32'; Ibañez (yellow card) 90+2'; Kumbulla (yellow card) 90+4'	Report	Zima (yellow card) 54'	Stadium: Stadio Olimpico; Attendance: 46,728; Referee: Daniele Chiffi

2 December 2021 15	Torino	2–2	Empoli	Turin
18:30 CET (UTC+1)	Pobega 10'; Pjaca 15'; Singo (red card) 32'; Aina (yellow card) 50'	Report	Romagnoli 34'; Bandinelli (yellow card) 45+1'; Marchizza (yellow card) 57'; La Mantia 72'; Luperto (yellow card) 90+4'	Stadium: Stadio Olimpico Grande Torino; Attendance: 7,002; Referee: Andrea Colombo

6 December 2021 16	Cagliari	1–1	Torino	Cagliari
20:45 CET (UTC+1)	Dalbert (yellow card) 18'; João Pedro 53'; Cáceres (yellow card) 59'	Report	Pobega (yellow card) 30'; Carboni 31' (o.g.); Lukić (yellow card) 34'; Buongiorno (yellow card) 48'; Zima (yellow card) 57'	Stadium: Sardegna Arena; Attendance: 8,799; Referee: Luca Massimi

12 December 2021 17	Torino	2–1	Bologna	Turin
12:30 CET (UTC+1)	Sanabria 24'; Soumaoro 69' (o.g.)	Report	Orsolini 79' (pen.)	Stadium: Stadio Olimpico Grande Torino; Attendance: 6,562; Referee: Federico Dionisi

19 December 2021 18	Torino	1–0	Hellas Verona	Turin
18:00 CET (UTC+1)	Pobega 26'; Buongiorno (yellow card) 90+2'	Report	Magnani (red card) 25'; Ceccherini (yellow card) 28'; Simeone (yellow card) 65'	Stadium: Stadio Olimpico Grande Torino; Attendance: 6,202; Referee: Michael Fabbri

22 December 2021 19	Internazionale	1–0	Torino	Milan
18:30 CET (UTC+1)	Dumfries 30'; Çalhanoğlu (yellow card) 65'	Report		Stadium: San Siro; Attendance: 41,413; Referee: Marco Guida

10 January 2022 21	Torino	4–0	Fiorentina	Turin
17:00 CET (UTC+1)	Singo 19'; Brekalo 23', 31'; Djidji (yellow card) 29'; Vojvoda (yellow card) 55'; Sanabria 58'	Report	Martínez Quarta (yellow card) 13'; Igor (yellow card) 62'	Stadium: Stadio Olimpico Grande Torino; Attendance: 3,545; Referee: Livio Marinelli

15 January 2022 22	Sampdoria	1–2	Torino	Genoa
15:00 CET (UTC+1)	Caputo 18'	Report	Singo 27'; Lukić (yellow card) 52'; Bremer (yellow card) 65'; Praet 67'	Stadium: Stadio Luigi Ferraris; Attendance: 2,549; Referee: Luca Massimi

23 January 2022 23	Torino	1–1	Sassuolo	Turin
15:00 CET (UTC+1)	Sanabria 16'; Mandragora (yellow card) 63'; Bremer (yellow card) 64'; Pobega (yellow card) 75'	Report	Rogério (yellow card) 51'; Scamacca (yellow card) 63'; Frattesi (yellow card) 86'; Raspadori 88'	Stadium: Stadio Olimpico Grande Torino; Attendance: 5,000; Referee: Francesco Fourneau

6 February 2022 24	Udinese	2–0	Torino	Udine
18:00 CET (UTC+1)	Jajalo (yellow card) 36'; Soppy (yellow card) 66'; Arslan (yellow card) 67'; Molina 90+3'; Pussetto 90+7' (pen.)	Report	Lukić (yellow card) 20'; Mandragora (yellow card) 65' (yellow-red card) 90+2'; Singo (yellow card) 67'; Praet (yellow card) 72'	Stadium: Stadio Friuli; Attendance: 9,837; Referee: Antonio Rapuano

12 February 2022 25	Torino	1–2	Venezia	Turin
20:45 CET (UTC+1)	Brekalo 5'; Djidji (yellow card) 48'; Bremer (yellow card) 87'	Report	Busio (yellow card) 1'; Haps 38'; Črnigoj 46'; Caldara (yellow card) 82'; Ampadu (yellow card) 89'; Okereke (red card) 90+8'	Stadium: Stadio Olimpico Grande Torino; Attendance: 6,681; Referee: Antonio Giua

18 February 2022 26	Juventus	1–1	Torino	Turin
20:45 CET (UTC+1)	De Ligt 13'; Cuadrado (yellow card) 73'	Report	Belotti 62'; Lukić (yellow card) 82'; Mandragora (yellow card) 90'	Stadium: Juventus Stadium; Attendance: 20,132; Referee: Davide Massa

27 February 2022 27	Torino	1–2	Cagliari	Turin
12:30 CET (UTC+1)	Pobega (yellow card) 51'; Belotti 54'; Singo (yellow card) 90+1'	Report	Bellanova 21'; Lovato (yellow card) 40'; Deiola 62'; Goldaniga (yellow card) 74'; Pavoletti (yellow card) 90'; Dalbert (yellow card) 90+4'	Stadium: Stadio Olimpico Grande Torino; Attendance: 10,231; Referee: Manuel Volpi

6 March 2022 28	Bologna	0–0	Torino	Bologna
15:00 CET (UTC+1)	Schouten (yellow card) 26'; Theate (yellow card) 63'; Medel (yellow card) 70'	Report	Pobega (yellow card) 34'; Ricci (yellow card) 68'; Rodriguez (yellow card) 78'	Stadium: Stadio Renato Dall'Ara; Attendance: 17,575; Referee: Luca Massimi

13 March 2022 29	Torino	1–1	Internazionale	Turin
20:45 CET (UTC+1)	Bremer 12'; Izzo (yellow card) 80'	Report	Bastoni (yellow card) 31'; Ranocchia (yellow card) 67'; Dimarco (yellow card) 81'; Gosens (yellow card) 84'; Barella (yellow card) 90'; Sánchez 90+3'	Stadium: Stadio Olimpico Grande Torino; Attendance: 15,363; Referee: Marco Guida

18 March 2022 30	Genoa	1–0	Torino	Genoa
21:00 CET (UTC+1)	Østigård (yellow card) 10' (yellow-red card) 24'; Portanova 14'; Bani (yellow card) 84'	Report	Izzo (yellow card) 88'; Pobega (yellow card) 90'; Ansaldi (yellow card) 90+2'	Stadium: Stadio Luigi Ferraris; Attendance: 14,961; Referee: Maurizio Mariani

2 April 2022 31	Salernitana	0–1	Torino	Salerno
20:45 CEST (UTC+2)	Fazio (yellow card) 15' (yellow-red card) 85'; Bonazzoli (yellow card) 69'; Éderson (yellow card) 80'; Gyömbér (yellow card) 83'	Report	Belotti 18' (pen.), (yellow card) 35'; Izzo (yellow card) 64'; Berisha (yellow card) 69'; Singo (yellow card) 90'	Stadium: Stadio Arechi; Attendance: 8,650; Referee: Marco Piccinini

10 April 2022 32	Torino	0–0	Milan	Turin
20:45 CEST (UTC+2)	Lukić (yellow card) 14'; Pobega (yellow card) 31'	Report	Tomori (yellow card) 18'; Kalulu (yellow card) 36'	Stadium: Stadio Olimpico Grande Torino; Attendance: 23,472; Referee: Daniele Doveri

16 April 2022 33	Lazio	1–1	Torino	Rome
20:45 CEST (UTC+2)	Immobile (yellow card) 90+1', (goal) 90+3'	Report	Pellegri (yellow card) 53', (goal) 56'; Lukić (yellow card) 90+1'	Stadium: Stadio Olimpico; Attendance: 25,000; Referee: Alessandro Prontera

23 April 2022 34	Torino	2–1	Spezia	Turin
15:00 CEST (UTC+2)	Lukić 4' (pen.), 69'; Bremer (yellow card) 62'	Report	Erlić (yellow card) 3'; Nikolaou (yellow card) 24'; Manaj 90+6' (pen.)	Stadium: Stadio Olimpico Grande Torino; Attendance: 8,333; Referee: Davide Ghersini

27 April 2022 20	Atalanta	4–4	Torino	Bergamo
20:15 CEST (UTC+2)	Muriel 18' (pen.), 83' (pen.); De Roon 23'; Freuler (yellow card) 35'; Pašalić (yellow card) 69', (goal) 78'	Report	Sanabria 4'; Lukić 36' (pen.), 63' (pen.), (yellow card) 52'; Freuler 68' (o.g.); Zima (yellow card) 83'	Stadium: Gewiss Stadium; Attendance: 10,014; Referee: Rosario Abisso
Note: The match was originally scheduled for 6 January 2022, but was postponed to 27 April 2022 due to COVID-19 outbreaks within the squads.

1 May 2022 35	Empoli	1–3	Torino	Empoli
15:00 CEST (UTC+2)	Pinamonti (yellow card) 18'; Henderson (yellow card) 51'; Żurkowski 56'; Verre (red card) 59'; Stojanović (yellow card) 75' (yellow-red card) 86'; Luperto (yellow card) 85'	Report	Vojvoda (yellow card) 18'; Lukić (yellow card) 29'; Belotti 78' (pen.), 87' (pen.), 90+6'	Stadium: Stadio Carlo Castellani; Attendance: 8,416; Referee: Francesco Cosso

7 May 2022 36	Torino	0–1	Napoli	Turin
15:00 CEST (UTC+2)	Vojvoda (yellow card) 55'; Singo (yellow card) 79'	Report	Mertens (yellow card) 53'; Lozano (yellow card) 56'; Insigne (penalty missed) 61'; Fabián 73'; Elmas (yellow card) 90+6'	Stadium: Stadio Olimpico Grande Torino; Attendance: 14,619; Referee: Alessandro Prontera

14 May 2022 37	Hellas Verona	0–1	Torino	Verona
18:00 CEST (UTC+2)	Günter (yellow card) 28'; Casale (yellow card) 29'; Caprari (yellow card) 43'	Report	Brekalo 19'; Izzo (yellow card) 43'; Praet (yellow card) 80'	Stadium: Stadio Marcantonio Bentegodi; Attendance: 24,001; Referee: Giacomo Camplone

20 May 2022 38	Torino	0–3	Roma	Turin
20:45 CEST (UTC+2)	Ansaldi (yellow card) 21'; Buongiorno (yellow card) 78'	Report	Ibañez (yellow card) 20'; Abraham 33', 42' (pen.); Shomurodov (yellow card) 76'; Pellegrini 78' (pen.)	Stadium: Stadio Olimpico Grande Torino; Attendance: 16,730; Referee: Massimiliano Irrati

=== Coppa Italia ===
15 August 2021 First round	Torino	0–0 (a.e.t.) (4–1 p)	Cremonese	Turin
21:00 CEST (UTC+2)	Rodriguez (yellow card) 20'; Lukić (yellow card) 62'; Rauti (yellow card) 90+5'; Mandragora (penalty missed) 116'	Report	Báez (yellow card) 10' (yellow-red card) 63'; Bartolomei (yellow card) 29'; Carnesecchi (yellow card) 101'	Stadium: Stadio Olimpico Grande Torino; Attendance: 1,484; Referee: Giovanni Ayroldi
	Penalties
	Mandragora (penalty scored); Verdi (penalty scored); Rauti (penalty scored); Aina (penalty scored)		(penalty missed) Ciofani; (penalty scored) Vido; (penalty missed) Castagnetti

16 December 2021 Second round	Sampdoria	2–1	Torino	Genoa
18:00 CET (UTC+1)	Quagliarella 16' (pen.); Chabot (yellow card) 52'; Verre 60'; Ciervo (yellow card) 64'; Murru (yellow card) 69'; Askildsen (yellow card) 88'; Silva (yellow card) 90+4'	Report	Mandragora 54' (pen.); Buongiorno (yellow card) 59'	Stadium: Stadio Luigi Ferraris; Attendance: 3,124; Referee: Marco Piccinini

== Statistics ==
=== Appearances and goals ===
No.	Pos	Nat	Player	Total		Serie A		Coppa Italia	
No.	Pos	Nat	Player	Apps	Goals	Apps	Goals	Apps	Goals
Goalkeepers
1	GK	(Albania) ALB	Etrit Berisha	11	0	10	0	1	0
32	GK	(Serbia) SRB	Vanja Milinković-Savić	28	0	27	0	1	0
89	GK	(Italy) ITA	Luca Gemello	1	0	1	0	0	0
Defenders
3	DF	(Brazil) BRA	Bremer	33	3	33	3	0	0
5	DF	(Italy) ITA	Armando Izzo	13	0	6+5	0	1+1	0
6	DF	(Czech Republic) CZE	David Zima	20	0	13+7	0	0	0
13	DF	(Switzerland) SUI	Ricardo Rodriguez	36	0	28+6	0	1+1	0
15	DF	(Argentina) ARG	Cristian Ansaldi	20	0	5+14	0	1	0
17	DF	(Ivory Coast) CIV	Wilfried Singo	36	3	32+3	3	1	0
26	DF	(Ivory Coast) CIV	Koffi Djidji	26	0	21+4	0	1	0
27	DF	(Kosovo) KOS	Mërgim Vojvoda	30	0	22+7	0	0+1	0
34	DF	(Nigeria) NGR	Ola Aina	23	0	17+4	0	2	0
99	DF	(Italy) ITA	Alessandro Buongiorno	25	0	12+11	0	2	0
Midfielders
4	MF	(Italy) ITA	Tommaso Pobega	33	4	24+9	4	0	0
10	MF	(Serbia) SRB	Saša Lukić	36	5	34+1	5	1	0
14	MF	(Croatia) CRO	Josip Brekalo	33	7	26+6	7	1	0
22	MF	(Belgium) BEL	Dennis Praet	24	2	17+6	2	0+1	0
23	MF	(Senegal) SEN	Demba Seck	6	0	1+5	0	0	0
28	MF	(Italy) ITA	Samuele Ricci	12	0	9+3	0	0	0
38	MF	(Italy) ITA	Rolando Mandragora	23	1	16+5	0	2	1
77	MF	(Poland) POL	Karol Linetty	18	0	11+5	0	0+2	0
88	MF	(Venezuela) VEN	Tomás Rincón	2	0	0	0	1+1	0
Forwards
7	FW	(Italy) ITA	Simone Zaza	11	0	0+10	0	1	0
9	FW	(Italy) ITA	Andrea Belotti	23	8	16+6	8	1	0
11	FW	(Croatia) CRO	Marko Pjaca	26	3	13+11	3	1+1	0
19	FW	(Paraguay) PAR	Antonio Sanabria	29	6	22+7	6	0	0
64	FW	(Italy) ITA	Pietro Pellegri	9	1	1+8	1	0	0
70	FW	(Denmark) DEN	Magnus Warming	5	0	0+4	0	0+1	0
Players transferred out during the season
8	MF	(Italy) ITA	Daniele Baselli	7	0	0+6	0	1	0
23	MF	(Italy) ITA	Nicola Rauti	1	0	0	0	0+1	0
24	MF	(Italy) ITA	Simone Verdi	4	1	0+3	1	0+1	0
25	MF	(Ivory Coast) CIV	Ben Lhassine Kone	2	0	0+1	0	0+1	0

Last updated: 20 May 2022
Source: Competitions

=== Goalscorers ===
As of 7 May 2022

Rank	No.	Pos.	Nat.	Name	Serie A	Coppa Italia	Total
1	9	FW	(Italy)	Andrea Belotti	8	0	8
2	14	MF	(Croatia)	Josip Brekalo	6	0	6
2	19	FW	(Paraguay)	Antonio Sanabria	6	0	6
4	7	MF	(Serbia)	Saša Lukić	5	0	5
5	4	MF	(Italy)	Tommaso Pobega	4	0	4
6	3	DF	(Brazil)	Bremer	3	0	3
6	11	FW	(Croatia)	Marko Pjaca	3	0	3
6	17	DF	(Ivory Coast)	Wilfried Singo	3	0	3
9	22	MF	(Belgium)	Dennis Praet	2	0	2
10	24	FW	(Italy)	Simone Verdi	1	0	1
10	38	MF	(Italy)	Rolando Mandragora	0	1	1
10	64	FW	(Italy)	Pietro Pellegri	1	0	1
Own goals					3	0	3
Totals					45	1	46
