= Gleison Bremer =

Brazilian footballer (born 1997)

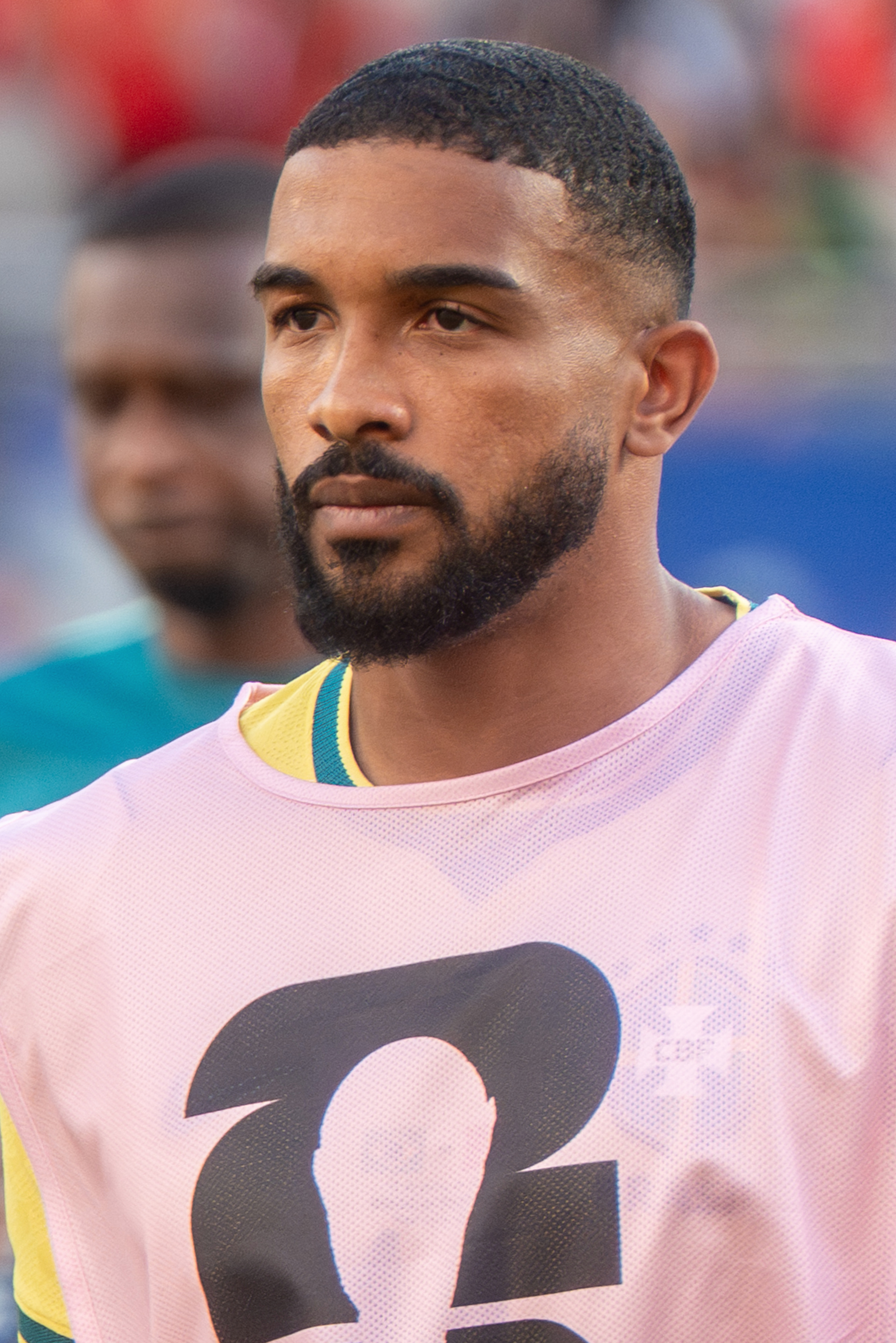
- Bremer with Brazil in 2026

Personal information
- Full name: Gleison Bremer Silva Nascimento
- Date of birth: 18 March 1997 (age 29)
- Place of birth: Itapitanga, Brazil
- Height: 1.88 m (6 ft 2 in)
- Position: Centre-back

Team information
- Current team: Juventus
- Number: 3

Youth career
- 2014–2016: Desportivo Brasil
- 2015–2016: → São Paulo (loan)
- 2017–2018: Atlético Mineiro

Senior career*
Years	Team	Apps	(Gls)
2017–2018	Atlético Mineiro	25	(1)
2018–2022	Torino	98	(11)
2022–	Juventus	109	(14)

International career^{‡}
2022–	Brazil	8	(1)
- * Club domestic league appearances and goals as of 23:05, 8 November 2026 (UTC) ‡ National team caps and goals as of 03:47, 7 June 2026 (UTC)

Gleison Bremer Silva Nascimento (born 18 March 1997), known as Gleison Bremer (Brazilian Portuguese: [ˈɡlejsõ ˈbɾẽmeʁ]) or simply Bremer, is a Brazilian professional footballer who plays as a centre-back for Serie A club Juventus and the Brazil national team.

== Early life ==
Gleison Bremer Silva Nascimento was born on 18 March 1997 in Itapitanga, Bahia. His father gave him the name in honour of the German footballer Andreas Brehme.

== Club career ==
=== Early career ===
Bremer joined Desportivo Brasil in 2014, aged 17. In 2016 he was loaned to São Paulo for one year, and was initially assigned to the under-20 squad. He made his professional debut with the reserves on 12 October of that year, coming on as a late substitute in a 3–0 home loss against Rio Claro, for the year's Copa Paulista.

=== Atlético Mineiro ===
In March 2017, Bremer moved to Atlético Mineiro for a fee of R$ 380,000. Promoted to the main squad in June, he made his first team – and Série A – debut on 25 June, replacing injured Rodrigão in a 1–0 away win against Chapecoense. On 11 July 2017, Bremer renewed his contract until the end of 2021.

His first senior professional goal and only goal for Atlético came in a 2–1 win over Athletico Paranaense on 13 May 2018.

=== Torino ===
On 10 July 2018, Bremer joined Italian club Torino on a five-year deal. He made his debut with the Granata on 12 August in the Coppa Italia against Cosenza (4–0), entering in the 23rd minutes of the second half in place of Armando Izzo. On 19 August he made his debut in Serie A, once again as a substitute for Izzo, in a game lost 1–0 against Roma. Bremer made his first appearance as a starter on 3 May 2019 in the Turin deby, a 1–1 draw against Juventus. In his first season with Torino he made a total of seven appearances between Serie A and the Coppa Italia, mainly as a reserve to Emiliano Moretti and Koffi Djidji.

After Moretti's retirement at the end of the season, Walter Mazzarri began using Bremer as a starter at the beginning of the 2019–20 season. On 25 July 2019, he made his debut in UEFA competitions, in the first qualifying round of the Europa League against Debrecen. In the second qualifying round, he scored an own goal in a 3–2 home loss to Wolverhampton Wanderers.

In the 2020–21 season, Bremer began to play as a starter for Torino with more continuity, and on 30 November 2020 scored the match-winning goal in an away win against Genoa (1–0). On 28 January 2020, he scored a brace in the Coppa Italia, which ended in a 4–2 defeat against AC Milan. Following the resumption of the season, he played all games as a starter for Torino and contributed a further two goals. He ended the season with a total of 35 appearances and five goals in all competitions.

On 2 February 2022, Bremer extended his contract with the club until 2024. His performances offered throughout the 2021–22 season earned him the award as the best defender of the Serie A season.

=== Juventus ===
On 20 July 2022, Bremer joined rival club Juventus on a five-year deal. He made his competitive debut on 15 August, in a Serie A 3–0 win over Sassuolo. On 11 September, he scored his first goal for the Bianconeri, in a 2–2 draw to Salernitana in the league. On 28 February 2023, Bremer scored for Juventus against his former club Torino in a 4–2 Derby della Mole win.

On 27 December 2023, after establishing himself in Juventus' defence during the first half of the season, Bremer extended his contract with The Old Lady until 2028.

On 16 May 2024, he played the full match in the 2024 Coppa Italia final which Juventus won 1–0 against Atalanta. On 2 October 2024, Bremer sustained an anterior cruciate ligament injury in the sixth minute of a UEFA Champions League match against RB Leipzig, ending his 2024–25 season.

Bremer returned from injury on the opening day of the 2025–26 Serie A season, helping Juve to a clean sheet in the 2–0 win over Parma. A meniscus injury sustained in October 2025 saw him miss fifteen matches, with the defender making his return after a 78-day absence in a 1–0 win at Bologna on 14 December. He scored his first goal since May 2024 in a 5–0 win over Cremonese on 12 January 2026.

== International career ==
On 9 September 2022, Bremer received his first call up to the Brazil national team, for friendlies against Ghana and Tunisia. He made his debut against Ghana on 23 September, in a 3–0 win.

On 7 November, Bremer was named in the squad for the 2022 FIFA World Cup. He played the full match in a 1–0 loss to Cameroon in Group G, as well as 18 minutes as a substitute in the 4–1 round of 16 defeat of South Korea. Bremer was included in Brazil's squad for the 2024 Copa América, but did not make any appearances at the tournament. On 26 March 2026, he scored his first goal for Brazil in a 2–1 friendly loss against France.

On 18 May 2026, Bremer was named to Brazil's squad for the 2026 FIFA World Cup. However, he failed to make an single appearance at the tournament, which saw Brazil eliminated in the round of 16.

== Style of play ==
Bremer is centre-back known for his ability and sense of positioning. A versatile player, he is often complimented for his speed, and has said to be inspired by the Brazilian defender Lúcio.

== Career statistics ==
=== Club ===
As of match played 8 November 2026

Appearances and goals by club, season and competition
Club	Season	League			National cup (Note: Includes Copa do Brasil, Coppa Italia)		Continental		Other		Total	
Club	Season	Division	Apps	Goals	Apps	Goals	Apps	Goals	Apps	Goals	Apps	Goals
Atlético Mineiro	2017	Série A	12	0	1	0	1 (Note: Appearance in Copa Libertadores)	0	1 (Note: Appearance in Primeira Liga)	0	15	0
Atlético Mineiro	2018	Série A	11	1	3	0	2 (Note: Appearancea in Copa Sudamericana)	0	2 (Note: Appearances in Campeonato Mineiro)	0	18	1
Atlético Mineiro	Total		23	1	4	0	3	0	3	0	33	1
Torino	2018–19	Serie A	5	0	2	0	—		—		7	0
Torino	2019–20	Serie A	27	3	2	2	6 (Note: Appearances in UEFA Europa League)	0	—		35	5
Torino	2020–21	Serie A	33	5	2	0	—		—		35	5
Torino	2021–22	Serie A	33	3	0	0	—		—		33	3
Torino	Total		98	11	6	2	6	0	—		110	13
Juventus	2022–23	Serie A	30	4	3	1	10 (Note: Three appearances in UEFA Champions League, seven appearances in UEFA Europa League)	0	—		43	5
Juventus	2023–24	Serie A	36	3	4	0	—		—		40	3
Juventus	2024–25	Serie A	6	0	0	0	2 (Note: Appearances in UEFA Champions League)	0	0	0	8	0
Juventus	2025–26	Serie A	26	4	1	0	4	0	—		31	4
Juventus	2026–27	Serie A	11	3	0	0	4	0	—		15	3
Juventus	Total		109	14	8	1	20	0	0	0	137	15
Career total			230	26	18	3	29	0	3	0	280	29

=== International ===
As of match played 6 June 2026

Appearances and goals by national team and year
National team	Year	Apps	Goals
Brazil	2022	3	0
Brazil	2024	2	0
Brazil	2026	3	1
Total		8	1

Scores and results list Brazil's goal tally first.

List of international goals scored by Bremer
No.	Date	Venue	Cap	Opponent	Score	Result	Competition
1	26 March 2026	Gillette Stadium, Foxborough, United States	6	France	1–2	1–2	Friendly

== Honours ==
Juventus

- Coppa Italia: 2023–24

Individual

- Serie A Best Defender: 2021–22
- Serie A Team of the Year: 2021–22
- EA Sports FC Serie A Team of the Season: 2022–23, 2023–24, 2025–26
