= Ben Lhassine Kone =

Ivorian footballer

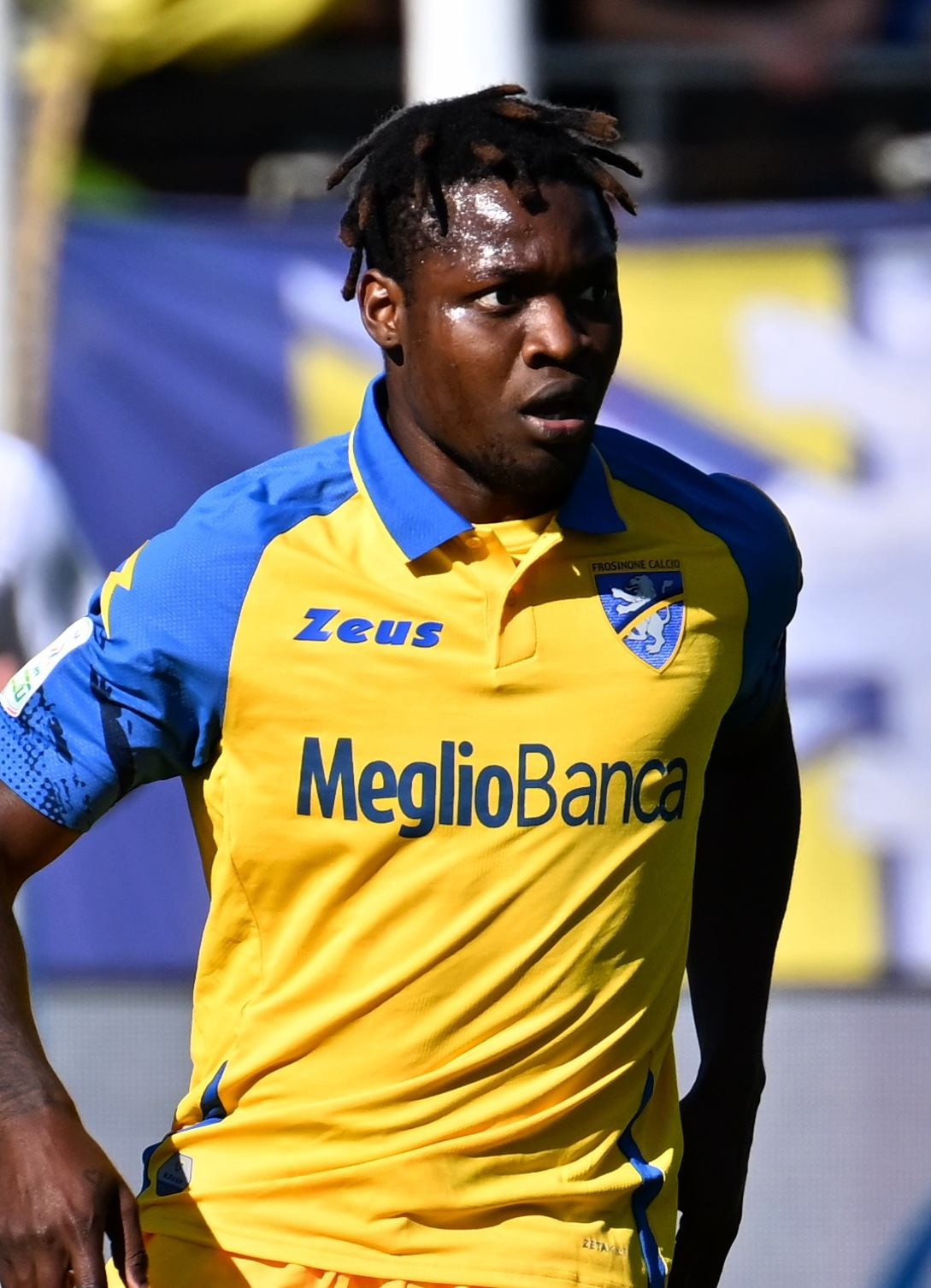
- Kone in 2023

Personal information
- Full name: Benjamin Lhassine Kone
- Date of birth: 14 March 2000 (age 26)
- Place of birth: Abidjan, Ivory Coast
- Height: 1.72 m (5 ft 8 in)
- Position: Midfielder

Team information
- Current team: Frosinone
- Number: 4

Youth career
- 2015–2017: Vigor Perconti
- 2017–2019: Torino

Senior career*
Years	Team	Apps	(Gls)
2017–2024	Torino	1	(0)
2019–2021	→ Cosenza (loan)	32	(1)
2022	→ Crotone (loan)	16	(1)
2022–2023	→ Frosinone (loan)	19	(2)
2023–2024	→ Como (loan)	13	(0)
2024–2026	Como	4	(0)
2025	→ Frosinone (loan)	9	(1)
2025–2026	→ Frosinone (loan)	19	(1)
2026–	Frosinone	1	(0)
- * Club domestic league appearances and goals as of 13 September 2026

Benjamin Lhassine Kone (born 14 March 2000) is an Ivorian professional footballer who plays as a midfielder for Serie A club Frosinone.

== Career ==
=== Torino ===
Kone started playing for Torino's Primavera (under-19 team) in the 2017–18 season.

He also received occasional call-ups to the senior squad during the 2017–18 Serie A and 2018–19 Serie A seasons, but did not make any appearances.

==== Loan to Cosenza ====
On 3 August 2019, Kone joined Serie B club Cosenza on a season-long loan. He made his league debut for Cosenza on 31 August 2019, in a game against Salernitana. He was substituted on in place of Riccardo Idda in the 79th minute. Kone missed most of the 2019–20 season due to a cruciate ligament rupture.

On 15 September 2020, the loan was renewed for the 2020–21 season.

==== Return to Torino ====
After returning to Torino for the 2021–22 season, Kone made his debut for the club on 17 October 2021, coming on as a substitute for the injured Rolando Mandragora in a 1–0 away loss to Napoli. He was replaced again in injury time for Magnus Warming.

==== Loan to Crotone ====
On 26 January 2022, Kone joined Crotone on loan.

==== Loan to Frosinone ====
On 1 August 2022, he moved to Frosinone on loan.

=== Como ===
On 25 July 2023, Kone moved to Como. The first year of the contract is a loan, followed by an obligation to buy. He signed a contract until 2027 with Como. On 3 February 2025, Kone returned to Frosinone on loan. On 1 September 2025, he moved on a new loan to Frosinone, with a conditional obligation to buy.

== Career statistics ==
As of match played 10 January 2025

Appearances and goals by club, season and competition
Club	Season	League			Cup		Other		Total	
Club	Season	Division	Apps	Goals	Apps	Goals	Apps	Goals	Apps	Goals
Torino	2017–18	Serie A	0	0	0	0	0	0	0	0
Torino	2021–22	Serie A	1	0	1	0	—		2	0
Torino	Total		1	0	1	0	0	0	2	0
Cosenza (loan)	2019–20	Serie B	6	0	1	0	—		7	0
Cosenza (loan)	2020–21	Serie B	26	1	3	1	—		29	2
Cosenza (loan)	Total		32	1	4	1	—		36	2
Crotone (loan)	2021–22	Serie B	16	1	—		—		16	1
Frosinone (loan)	2022–23	Serie B	19	2	1	1	—		20	3
Como (loan)	2023–24	Serie B	13	0	—		—		13	0
Como	2024–25	Serie A	4	0	—		—		4	0
Como	Total		17	0	0	0	—		17	0
Career total			85	4	6	2	0	0	91	6

== Honours ==
Frosinone

- Serie B: 2022–23
