= Luca Gemello =

Italian footballer

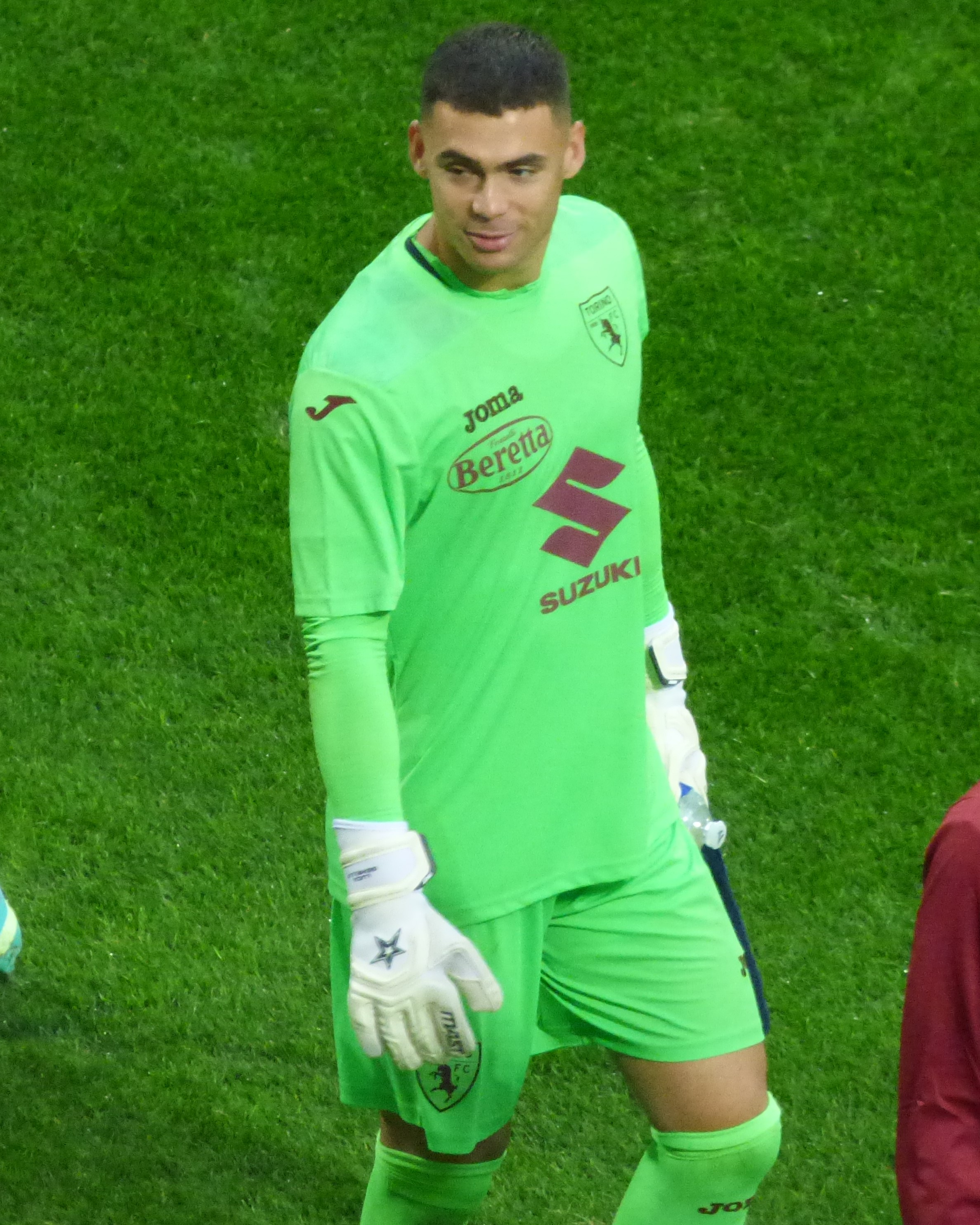
- Gemello with Torino in 2023

Personal information
- Date of birth: 3 July 2000 (age 26)
- Place of birth: Savigliano, Italy
- Height: 1.90 m (6 ft 3 in)
- Position: Goalkeeper

Team information
- Current team: Mantova
- Number: 1

Youth career
- –2017: Fossano
- 2016–2017: → Torino (loan)
- 2017–2019: Torino

Senior career*
Years	Team	Apps	(Gls)
2018–2024	Torino	3	(0)
2019–2020	→ Fermana (loan)	11	(0)
2020–2021	→ Renate (loan)	41	(0)
2024–2026	Perugia	70	(0)
2026–	Mantova	0	(0)

International career^{‡}
2017	Italy U17	2	(0)
2017	Italy U18	1	(0)
- * Club domestic league appearances and goals as of 22 August 2026 ‡ National team caps and goals as of 2 September 2017

Luca Gemello (born 3 July 2000) is an Italian professional footballer who plays as a goalkeeper for Serie B club Mantova.

== Club career ==
=== Torino ===
Gemello started playing for Torino's Under-19 squad in the 2017–18 season, and he won the Youth Super Cup the following year.

He received several call-ups to the senior squad in the 2018–19 Serie A and early 2019–20 Serie A seasons, but remained on the bench.

==== Loan to Fermana ====
On 2 September 2019, he joined Serie C club Fermana on loan.

He made his professional Serie C debut for Fermana on 15 September 2019 in a game against Piacenza. He established himself as first-choice goalkeeper at Fermana after his arrival.

==== Loan to Renate ====
On 24 August 2020, Gemello joined Renate on a new loan. He became the first-choice goalkeeper once more, maintaining his starting role for the rest of the season, as his squad reached the play-offs, but ultimately didn't reach promotion.

=== Return to Torino ===
After returning to Torino in the summer of 2021, he remained in the squad as the third-choice goalkeeper, behind Vanja Milinković-Savić and Etrit Berisha: although he served as a reserve during the entire first half of the season, in December of the same year he nevertheless had the opportunity to extend his contract with the club, which was prolonged until 2023, with an option for one more year.

Following the unavailability of the starting keeper Milinković-Savić, on 10 January 2022 Gemello made his debut for Torino, as well as in Serie A, playing the entirety of a 4–0 home win against Fiorentina.

=== Perugia ===
On 3 August 2024, Gemello signed a three-season contract with Perugia in Serie C.

== International career ==
Gemello first represented his country for the Italy U17 national team on 23 February 2017 in a friendly against Austria.

During the 2017 UEFA European Under-17 Championship, Marco Carnesecchi, who was backing up first-choice Simone Ghidotti, suffered an injury after two group games and Gemello was called up to the squad. He remained on the bench in the last group game as Italy lost to Turkey and was eliminated.
