= 2009 Division 2 (Swedish football) =

Swedish League Division 2
- Season: 2009
- Champions: Bodens BK; Dalkurd FF; Hammarby TFF; Norrby IF; Ytterby IS; Lunds BK
- Promoted: 6 teams above
- Relegated: 12 teams

Statistics of Swedish football Division 2 in season 2009.

== League standings ==
=== Norrland ===
Pos	Team	Pld	W	D	L	GF	GA	GD	Pts	Promotion or relegation
1	Bodens BK	22	13	6	3	54	19	+35	45	Promotion to Division 1
2	IFK Luleå	22	12	4	6	48	25	+23	40	
3	Ersboda SK	22	11	5	6	52	31	+21	38	
4	Umedalens IF	22	10	6	6	40	33	+7	36	
5	Piteå IF	22	10	5	7	45	43	+2	35	
6	Robertsfors IK	22	9	5	8	31	36	−5	32	
7	Sollefteå GIF	22	8	6	8	34	27	+7	30	
8	Mariehems SK	22	9	3	10	36	41	−5	30	
9	Anundsjö IF	22	8	4	10	42	44	−2	28	
10	Alviks IK	22	8	3	11	42	47	−5	27	Relegation playoffs to Division 3
11	Friska Viljor FC	22	7	4	11	47	52	−5	25	Relegation to Division 3
12	Infjärdens SK	22	1	1	20	19	92	−73	4	Relegation to Division 3

=== Division 2 Norra Svealand ===
Pos	Team	Pld	W	D	L	GF	GA	GD	Pts	Promotion or relegation
1	Dalkurd FF	22	17	4	1	68	27	+41	55	Promotion to Division 1
2	Skiljebo SK	22	13	3	6	43	25	+18	42	
3	IK Frej	22	11	7	4	49	30	+19	40	
4	Gamla Upsala SK	22	10	6	6	42	27	+15	36	
5	Västerås IK	22	11	3	8	32	24	+8	36	
6	Sandvikens IF	22	8	5	9	37	37	0	29	
7	IF Älgarna	22	8	4	10	26	44	−18	28	
8	Vallentuna BK	22	7	6	9	38	44	−6	27	
9	Sollentuna United FF	22	7	4	11	34	33	+1	25	
10	Råsunda IS	22	5	7	10	22	29	−7	22	Relegation playoffs to Division 3
11	Falu FK	22	6	4	12	30	40	−10	22	Relegation to Division 3
12	Söderhamns FF	22	2	1	19	17	78	−61	7	Relegation to Division 3

=== Division 2 Östra Svealand ===
Pos	Team	Pld	W	D	L	GF	GA	GD	Pts	Promotion or relegation
1	Hammarby TFF	22	16	3	3	59	22	+37	51	Promotion to Division 1
2	Värmbols FC	22	14	4	4	46	21	+25	46	
3	Akropolis IF	22	11	5	6	44	33	+11	38	
4	Värmdö IF	22	10	7	5	53	37	+16	37	
5	FC Gute	22	9	6	7	40	34	+6	33	
6	Enskede IK	22	8	7	7	30	29	+1	31	
7	Eskilstuna City FK	22	7	6	9	40	40	0	27	
8	Köping FF	22	7	5	10	39	40	−1	26	
9	Nyköpings BIS	22	7	5	10	31	40	−9	26	
10	Älvsjö AIK	22	6	5	11	32	55	−23	23	Relegation playoffs to Division 3
11	Spånga IS	22	4	9	9	35	50	−15	21	Relegation to Division 3
12	Panellinios IF	22	1	2	19	16	64	−48	5	Relegation to Division 3

=== Division 2 Östra Götaland ===
Pos	Team	Pld	W	D	L	GF	GA	GD	Pts	Promotion or relegation
1	Norrby IF	22	14	3	5	56	25	+31	45	Promotion to Division 1
2	Smedby AIS	22	12	5	5	53	26	+27	41	
3	Tenhults IF	22	12	4	6	51	40	+11	40	
4	Linköpings FF	22	11	5	6	43	34	+9	38	
5	Annelunds IF	22	8	6	8	40	32	+8	30	
6	KB Karlskoga	22	8	6	8	34	35	−1	30	
7	IK Gauthiod	22	9	2	11	33	47	−14	29	
8	Kinna IF	22	8	4	10	39	42	−3	28	
9	BK Kenty	22	7	5	10	23	34	−11	26	
10	Myresjö IF	22	4	11	7	37	42	−5	23	Relegation playoffs to Division 3
11	Melleruds IF	22	6	3	13	38	61	−23	21	Relegation to Division 3
12	Nässjö FF	22	4	4	14	18	47	−29	16	Relegation to Division 3

=== Division 2 Västra Götaland ===
Pos	Team	Pld	W	D	L	GF	GA	GD	Pts	Promotion or relegation
1	Ytterby IS	22	18	1	3	70	21	+49	55	Promotion to Division 1
2	Ramlösa Södra FF	22	14	2	6	48	24	+24	44	
3	Jonsereds IF	22	13	2	7	58	35	+23	41	
4	Utsiktens BK	22	13	2	7	45	22	+23	41	
5	Gunnilse IS	22	11	3	8	62	36	+26	36	
6	IS Halmia	22	10	4	8	46	42	+4	34	
7	Varbergs BoIS	22	9	4	9	48	38	+10	31	
8	Högaborgs BK	22	9	2	11	50	45	+5	29	
9	Fässbergs IF	22	8	1	13	40	43	−3	25	
10	Skärhamns IK	22	8	1	13	39	45	−6	25	Relegation playoffs to Division 3
11	Ahlafors IF	22	7	2	13	32	38	−6	23	Relegation to Division 3
12	Asmundtorps IF	22	0	0	22	10	159	−149	0	Relegation to Division 3

=== Division 2 Södra Götaland ===
Pos	Team	Pld	W	D	L	GF	GA	GD	Pts	Promotion or relegation
1	Lunds BK	22	17	2	3	51	26	+25	53	Promotion to Division 1
2	Höllvikens GIF	22	9	10	3	38	33	+5	37	
3	Lindsdals IF	22	10	6	6	36	26	+10	36	
4	IFK Klagshamn	22	8	10	4	39	30	+9	34	
5	Karlskrona AIF	22	6	10	6	47	40	+7	28	
6	IFK Hässleholm	22	7	6	9	39	48	−9	27	
7	Nybro IF	22	5	10	7	36	34	+2	25	
8	Ljungby IF	22	6	6	10	28	39	−11	24	
9	Lilla Torg FF	22	7	3	12	26	40	−14	24	
10	GIF Nike	22	5	8	9	48	47	+1	23	Relegation playoffs to Division 3
11	IFK Malmö	22	5	8	9	31	43	−12	23	Relegation to Division 3
12	Ifö/Bromölla IF	22	4	7	11	25	38	−13	19	Relegation to Division 3

== Player of the year awards ==
Ever since 2003 the online bookmaker Unibet have given out awards at the end of the season to the best players in Division 2. The recipients are decided by a jury of sportsjournalists, coaches and football experts. The names highlighted in green won the overall national award.

Norrland
Position	Player	Club
GK	(Sweden) Johan Lutström	IFK Luleå
DF	(Bosnia and Herzegovina) Haris Devic	Bodens BK
MF	(North Macedonia) Goran Zdravkov	Anundsjö IF
FW	(Sweden) Johan Isaksson	IFK Luleå

Norra Svealand
Position	Player	Club
GK	(Sweden) Mikael Cieslak	IK Frej
DF	(Sweden) Pierre Fondin	Vallentuna BK
MF	(Sweden) Sebastian Jurell	IK Frej
FW	(Bosnia and Herzegovina) Nedim Halilović	Dalkurd FF

Södra Svealand
Position	Player	Club
GK	(Sweden) Johannes Hopf	Hammarby TFF
DF	(Sweden) Marcus Törnstrand	Hammarby TFF
MF	(Sweden) Sebastian Bojassen	Hammarby TFF
FW	(Brazil) Marcio da Silva Rosa	Värmbols FC

Östra Götaland
Position	Player	Club
GK	(Sweden) Magnus Helin	FK Linköping
DF	(Sweden) Adam Eriksson	Norrby IF
MF	(Sweden) Fredrik Åström	Smedby AIS
FW	(Sweden) Johan Sjögren	Norrby IF

Västra Götaland
Position	Player	Club
GK	(Germany) Gabriel Wehling	Utsiktens BK
DF	(Sweden) Andreas Ljung	Ramlösa Södra FF
MF	(Sweden) John Andersson	Utsiktens BK
FW	(Sweden) Robert Vilahamn	Ytterby IS

Södra Götaland
Position	Player	Club
GK	(Albania) Etrit Berisha	Lindsdals IF
DF	(Sweden) John Bergqvist	Höllvikens GIF
MF	(Sweden) Joakim Persson	Lunds BK
FW	(Sweden) Ken Hansson	IFK Klagshamn
