= Magnus Warming =

Danish footballer (born 2000)

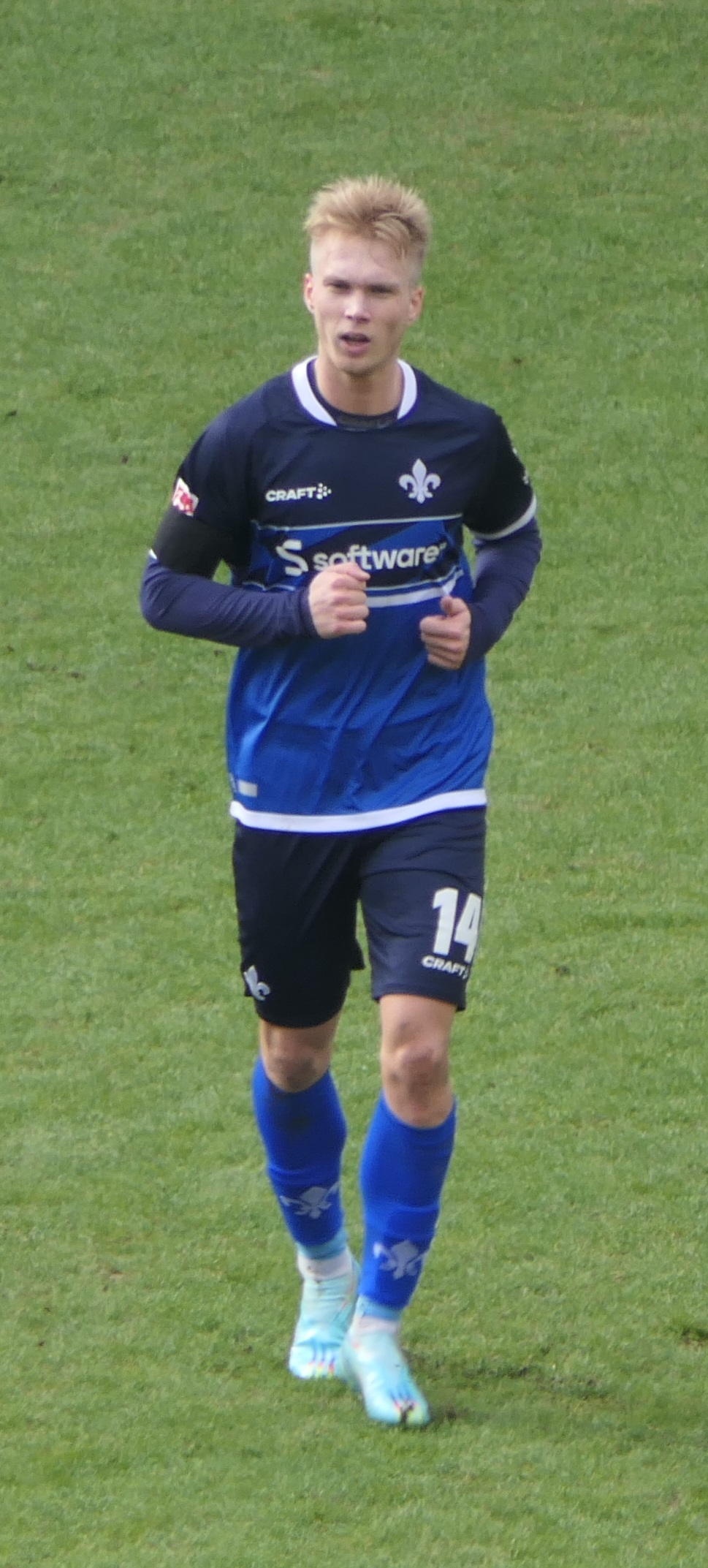
- Warming in 2023

Personal information
- Date of birth: 8 June 2000 (age 26)
- Place of birth: Nykøbing Falster, Denmark
- Height: 1.88 m (6 ft 2 in)
- Position: Winger

Team information
- Current team: Lyngby
- Number: 11

Youth career
- 2006–2015: Nykøbing
- 2015–2019: Brøndby

Senior career*
Years	Team	Apps	(Gls)
2017–2020	Brøndby	1	(0)
2018–2019	→ Nykøbing (loan)	23	(5)
2020–2021	Lyngby	38	(6)
2021–2023	Torino	4	(0)
2022–2023	→ Darmstadt (loan)	18	(0)
2023–2024	Brann	16	(1)
2024–	Lyngby	22	(1)

International career
2018	Denmark U18	1	(0)
2021	Denmark U20	2	(0)
2021	Denmark U21	4	(0)
- * Club domestic league appearances and goals as of 2 June 2026

Magnus Warming (Danish pronunciation: [ˈvɑːme̝ŋˀ]; born 8 June 2000) is a Danish professional footballer who plays as a winger for Danish 1st Division club Lyngby Boldklub.

== Club career ==
=== Brøndby ===
Warming joined Brøndby IF from Nykøbing FC in June 2015 at the age of 15.

Magnus Warming made his Brøndby IF debut at the age of 16 years and 348 days as the youngest player ever in the club history when he was brought on for the final ten minutes in the 3–0 away defeat against SønderjyskE on 21 May 2017. This feat has since been outdone by Morten Frendrup, who made his debut at age 16 and 310 days in 2018.

On 11 January 2019, Warming returned to Nykøbing FC on loan for the rest of 2019. Warming played nine league games and scored one goal for Nykøbing in the 2018–19 season. He returned to Brøndby and was training with the club in the first few weeks of the 2019–20 pre-season, before returned to Nykøbing in July to complete his loan deal.

=== Lyngby ===
On 7 January 2020, Warming was signed by Lyngby Boldklub. He impressed on multiple occasions, scoring decisive goals during the second half of the 2020–21 season especially. He suffered relegation to the Danish 1st Division with the club on 9 May 2021 after a loss to last placed AC Horsens. On 12 May 2021, it was announced that Warming had turned down a transfer offer from defending Norwegian champions Bodø/Glimt.

=== Torino ===
On 9 July 2021, it was announced that Warming had signed a three-year contract with Serie A club Torino. He made his debut on 17 October in the 1–0 away loss to Napoli, coming on as a late substitute for Ben Lhassine Kone.

==== Loan to Darmstadt ====
On 15 June 2022, Warming joined Darmstadt in Germany on loan with an option to buy. He made his league debut with the club on 16 July, in a 2–0 away defeat against Jahn Regensburg. On 1 August, he scored his first goal for Darmstadt in a 3–0 away win against FC Ingolstadt in the DFB-Pokal.

=== Brann ===
On 21 July 2023, Eliteserien club Brann announced the signing of Warming on a four-and-a-half-year contract, for an estimated transfer fee of NOK 8 million (€700,000). This made him Brann's most expensive signing since Daouda Bamba in 2018. The move saw Warming join his former teammate from Brøndby and Lyngby, Svenn Crone, as well as his former Denmark under-21 teammate Japhet Sery Larsen.

He suffered a muscle injury in August 2023, sidelining him for several weeks.

== Career statistics ==
As of match played 11 March 2023

Appearances and goals by club, season and competition
Club	Season	League			Cup (Note: Includes Danish Cup, Italian Cup, DFB-Pokal)		Europe		Other		Total	
Club	Season	Division	Apps	Goals	Apps	Goals	Apps	Goals	Apps	Goals	Apps	Goals
Brøndby IF	2016–17	Danish Superliga	1	0	0	0	0	0	0	0	1	0
Brøndby IF	2017–18	Danish Superliga	0	0	0	0	0	0	0	0	0	0
Brøndby IF	Total		1	0	0	0	0	0	0	0	1	0
Nykøbing (loan)	2018–19	Danish 1st Division	9	1	0	0	—		—		9	1
Nykøbing (loan)	2019–20	Danish 1st Division	14	4	1	0	—		—		15	4
Nykøbing (loan)	Total		23	5	1	0	—		—		24	5
Lyngby Boldklub	2019–20	Danish Superliga	8	2	0	0	—		1 (Note: Appearances in the Superliga relegation play-offs)	0	9	2
Lyngby Boldklub	2020–21	Danish Superliga	30	4	3	2	—		—		33	6
Lyngby Boldklub	Total		38	6	3	2	—		1	0	42	8
Torino	2021–22	Serie A	4	0	1	0	—		—		5	0
Darmstadt (loan)	2022–23	2. Bundesliga	18	0	1	1	—		—		19	1
Brann	2023	Eliteserien	1	0	0	0	1	1	0	0	2	1
Career total			85	11	5	3	1	1	1	0	92	15

== Honours ==
Lyngby

- Danish 1st Division: 2025–26
