= Etrit Berisha =

Albanian footballer (born 1989)

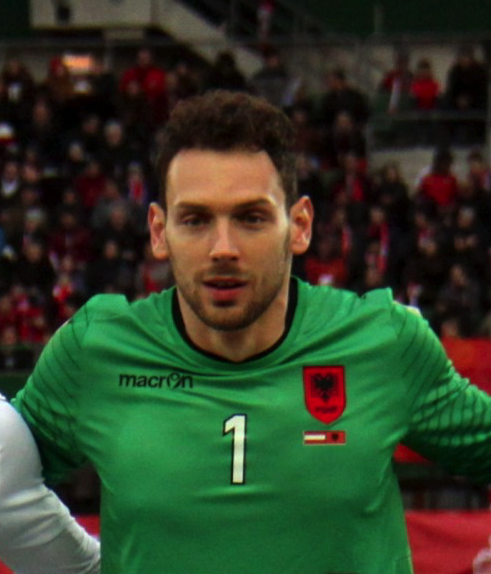
- Berisha with Albania in 2016

Personal information
- Full name: Etrit Fadil Berisha
- Date of birth: 10 March 1989 (age 37)
- Place of birth: Pristina, SFR Yugoslavia (modern-day Kosovo)
- Height: 1.94 m (6 ft 4 in)
- Position: Goalkeeper

Team information
- Current team: BK Häcken
- Number: 99

Youth career
- 1997–2007: 2 Korriku
- 2004–2007: → KEK-u (loan)
- 2008–2010: Kalmar FF

Senior career*
Years	Team	Apps	(Gls)
2007–2008	2 Korriku		
2008–2013	Kalmar FF	90	(3)
2009	→ Lindsdals IF (loan)	14	(0)
2013–2016	Lazio	38	(0)
2016–2019	Atalanta	75	(0)
2019–2022	SPAL	51	(0)
2021–2022	→ Torino (loan)	10	(0)
2022–2023	Torino	0	(0)
2023–2024	Empoli	14	(0)
2025–	BK Häcken	32	(0)

International career^{‡}
2012–	Albania	85	(0)
- * Club domestic league appearances and goals as of 8 November 2026 ‡ National team caps and goals as of 15 November 2026

Etrit Fadil Berisha (Albanian pronunciation: [ˈɛtɾit bɛˈɾiʃa]; born 10 March 1989) is a professional footballer who plays as a goalkeeper for Allsvenskan club BK Häcken and the Albania national team.

Born in Kosovo, Berisha began his career with 2 Korriku, making his senior debut at the age of 18 after spending time in the KEK-u youth system, before moving to Sweden in 2008 to join Kalmar FF, where he was part of the squad that won the 2008 Allsvenskan title. After a loan spell with fourth-tier club Lindsdals IF in 2009, he returned to Kalmar and established himself as the first-choice goalkeeper, spending four more seasons at the club, scoring several penalties in both regular play and shoot-outs, and being named Allsvenskan Goalkeeper of the Year in 2013.

In 2013, Berisha moved to Italy to join Lazio, reaching the Coppa Italia final in 2015, which Lazio lost, while finishing third in Serie A and qualifying for the UEFA Champions League play-off round, in which Berisha also played. In 2016, Berisha joined Atalanta, initially becoming the first-choice goalkeeper and helping the club finish fourth in Serie A in his first season and qualify for the UEFA Champions League for the first time in its history in 2019, his final year at the club, when he lost his starting position. He remained in Serie A, joining SPAL, who were relegated to Serie B, where he continued to play. He returned to Serie A by joining Torino in 2021, but after losing his place in the team following his first season and being excluded from the squad amid disputes in his second, he left the club. He moved to Empoli in 2023, where he spent one season before leaving as a free agent.

After nearly a year without a club, Berisha returned to Sweden in 2025, joining BK Häcken and winning the Svenska Cupen in his first year before making his debut in the UEFA Conference League league phase. Recurring back problems interrupted his campaign in 2026, although he returned to competitive action later that year.

Berisha initially represented the unofficial Kosovo national team before becoming an Albania international in 2012. He played at UEFA Euro 2016, Albania's first major international tournament, and was part of the squad for Euro 2024, during which he also served as captain; with over 80 appearances, he is the team's third-most-capped player and holds the records for most clean sheets and consecutive appearances.

== Club career ==
=== Early career ===
Berisha was born in Pristina, Kosovo, and began playing football at the age of eight in the youth ranks of hometown club 2 Korriku, initially as a midfielder before switching to goalkeeper. His development was interrupted by the Kosovo War in 1998–1999, after which 2 Korriku was reorganised, but financial difficulties prompted its youth players, including Berisha, to move to KEK-u in nearby Obiliq/Kastriot in 2004; he spent three years there, also trained temporarily with Bashkimi in Kumanovo, Macedonia, before returning to 2 Korriku in 2007 and progressing to its senior team that year.

=== Kalmar ===
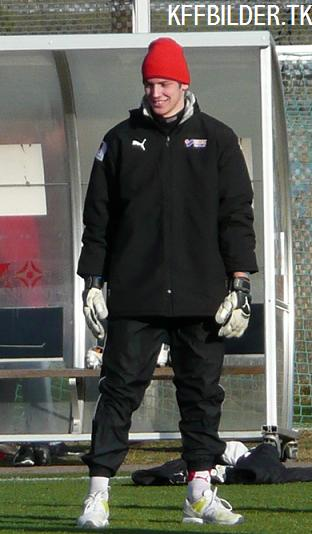
Berisha in training with Kalmar FF in 2008

In January 2008, Berisha joined Swedish club Kalmar FF after a trial arranged by Albert Bunjaki, then a member of the club's coaching staff and manager of the unofficial Kosovo national team. He was part of the 2008 Allsvenskan title-winning squad as one of three goalkeepers and was included in a 2008–09 UEFA Cup second qualifying round fixture, but made no appearances in either competition. A prominent member of the club's under-21 team, he was loaned to fourth-tier side Lindsdals IF in 2009, making 14 appearances and receiving one red card as the club finished third.

Berisha returned to Kalmar FF's first team for the 2010 season as a backup goalkeeper and made his debut on 28 April, replacing veteran Petter Wastå in the starting lineup for the first time in 15 years in a 4–1 home win over Örebro SK, after the club had gone winless in its opening nine Allsvenskan matches. He established himself as first-choice goalkeeper, keeping three clean sheets in his next five appearances as Kalmar recorded three wins and two draws, including a 1–0 victory over league leaders Helsingborgs IF on 16 May that handed them their first defeat of the season. After a muscle injury sidelined him during the summer, he returned in September and kept two consecutive clean sheets as Kalmar recorded three successive victories to climb to seventh place. He added another in a 1–0 away win over Malmö FF on 18 October, ending the league leaders' unbeaten home run. Later that month, he saved two penalties in a shoot-out against Hammarby IF in the Svenska Cupen semi-final, but Kalmar were eliminated after losing 6–5. In Kalmar's final Allsvenskan match of the season on 7 November, he kept a clean sheet in a 0–0 away draw against Helsingborgs IF, earning a rating of 4 out of 5 for keeping the hosts scoreless despite their dominance in possession and chances; Kalmar finished ninth, while Berisha recorded eight goals conceded in 14 league appearances.

On 14 January 2011, Berisha signed a contract extension through the 2013 season. He remained a regular starter, keeping six clean sheets, conceding 12 goals and receiving one red card in the first half of the 2011 Allsvenskan campaign as Kalmar recorded nine wins and two draws in 15 matches to sit third with 29 points. In the second half, Berisha conceded seven goals across three consecutive defeats, and despite keeping four clean sheets in the following six matches, Kalmar recorded only two wins and two goalless draws alongside two further defeats, dropping into mid-table by matchday 25, five rounds before the end of the season. On matchday 25 he delivered a strong performance in a 1–0 win over Halmstads BK on 17 September but twisted his foot during the warm-up for the following match against Djurgårdens IF, ruling him out for the remainder of the league campaign. In the Svenska Cupen, he saved two penalties and scored the decisive spot kick in a 5–4 shoot-out win over Malmö FF in the quarter-finals before featuring in a 4–3 extra-time victory over IFK Göteborg in the semi-finals. Having recovered from his injury, he was named among the substitutes for the final on 5 November, when Kalmar lost 3–1 to Helsingborgs IF.

Berisha played every minute of Kalmar's 30 matches in the 2012 Allsvenskan season, keeping six clean sheets and conceding 45 goals as the club recorded 10 wins, seven draws and 13 defeats to finish tenth with 37 points. As runners-up in the Svenska Cupen, Kalmar entered the 2012–13 UEFA Europa League in the first qualifying round, where Berisha made his European debut on 5 July in a 1–0 first-leg defeat to Cliftonville. In the return leg, he kept a clean sheet and scored his first goal for the club from the penalty spot in a 4–0 victory that secured Kalmar's progression to the second round. He kept two further clean sheets during the campaign as Kalmar reached the third qualifying round, where they were eliminated by Young Boys 3–1 on aggregate, with Berisha playing every minute of their European fixtures. On 12 August, he scored his second goal for Kalmar from the penalty spot in a 7–2 Allsvenskan defeat to Helsingborgs IF on matchday 19. His performances earned him a call-up to the Albania national team, where he established himself as a regular starter.

During the first half of the 2013 Allsvenskan season, Berisha kept five clean sheets and conceded 12 goals as Kalmar recorded six wins, six draws and three defeats. In July, he was named man of the match in a 1–0 victory over IF Brommapojkarna and scored from the penalty spot in a 2–2 home draw against the same opponent, as Kalmar remained in the upper half of the table. On 3 August, he kept a clean sheet in a 1–0 win over Syrianska, which lifted Kalmar to fifth place for the first time that season. On 1 September, he made two one-on-one saves and scored the winning goal from the penalty spot in a 1–0 victory over Halmstads, earning another man of the match award. It proved to be his final appearance for Kalmar, as the club agreed to his transfer to Lazio on a five-year contract, ending his spell with over 100 appearances in all competitions and earning praise for his professionalism, development and, in particular, his work with the goalkeeping coach. Despite departing before the end of the season, Berisha was named Allsvenskan Goalkeeper of the Year in November.

=== Lazio ===
==== 2013–14 season ====
On 3 September 2013, Berisha was included in Lazio's 2013–14 UEFA Europa League squad. He was initially regarded as Federico Marchetti's backup, remaining on the bench during the early Serie A matches and the Europa League group stage first-half. He made his competitive debut on 7 November, starting in the Europa League group stage matchday 4 fixture against Apollon Limassol, distinguishing himself with a crucial second-half save and helping in a 2–1 home win. He retained his starting place for Lazio's remaining group matches, keeping clean sheets in a 2–0 away win over Legia Warsaw and a goalless draw against Trabzonspor to help the club finish second in Group J with 12 points to advance to the round of 32.

Following an injury to Marchetti in late December, Berisha made his Serie A debut on 6 January 2014, keeping a clean sheet in a 1–0 home win over Inter Milan in Edoardo Reja's first match in charge. Five days later, he recorded his fourth consecutive clean sheet in a goalless away draw against Bologna, extending his scoreless run to 411 minutes and securing Lazio's first away clean sheet after conceding 18 goals in their previous nine away matches. His performances during this period retained him his place even after Marchetti's return, and he subsequently made several important saves to help Lazio earn a point in a 1–1 draw against league leaders Juventus on 25 January, with the opposition playing with ten men from the first half. On 29 January, Berisha made several saves before conceding an 82nd-minute goal in a 1–0 away defeat to Napoli in the Coppa Italia quarter-finals, eliminating Lazio from the competition.

On 9 February, Berisha kept a clean sheet in a goalless Derby della Capitale draw against Roma, making several important saves, including efforts from Maicon and Bastos, and earning the man of the match award. Later that month, he saved a penalty but could not prevent Lazio from losing 1–0 at home to Ludogorets in the first leg of their Europa League round of 32 tie. He was replaced by Marchetti for the return leg, in which two errors by the latter contributed to Lazio's elimination following a 3–3 away draw. Berisha remained on the bench throughout March before returning to the starting lineup later that month amid Marchetti's recurring fitness problems and inconsistent performances, helping Lazio record three wins and three draws and finishing the season with 17 Serie A appearances, seven clean sheets and 25 goals conceded, as the club finished ninth, two points short of the European qualification places. Berisha was named Best Foreign Goalkeeper of the Season and included in the Serie A XI.

==== 2014–15 season ====
Berisha began the 2014–15 season with a clean sheet on 24 August in a 7–0 Coppa Italia third round win over Bassano Virtus, started Lazio's first three Serie A matches, keeping another clean sheet in a 3–0 win against Cesena, before Federico Marchetti recovered from a thigh injury in September and became Stefano Pioli's first-choice, leaving Berisha as his deputy in Serie A. He nevertheless remained first choice in the Coppa Italia, conceding only once in three consecutive rounds and keeping two clean sheets, including in a 1–0 quarter-final win over Milan on 27 January, helping Lazio reach the semi-finals despite playing with ten men from before half-time. On 15 February, Berisha replaced the suspended Marchetti in a Serie A matchday 23 fixture and kept a clean sheet in a 1–0 win over Udinese, earning selection in Goal's Team of the Week. On 4 March, he made a key save from a deflected Manolo Gabbiadini free kick in a 1–1 draw against Napoli in the Coppa Italia semi-final first leg, before keeping clean sheet in a second-leg 1–0 away win on 8 April to help Lazio reach the final. Four days later, he made another Serie A appearance after Marchetti suffered a fractured nasal septum, keeping a clean sheet in a 4–0 win over Empoli as Lazio extended their winning streak to eight matches and moved into second place.

On 10 May, Berisha came on in the 17th minute against Inter after Marchetti was sent off and immediately saved Mauro Icardi's penalty, although Lazio eventually lost 2–1 to a late goal and remained third behind Roma. A week later, he kept another clean sheet in a 1–0 away win over Sampdoria as Lazio temporarily moved into second place, which would have secured direct qualification for the UEFA Champions League group stage, but remained on the bench for the final two Serie A matches, in which a 2–1 defeat to Roma ended their hopes of finishing second before a 4–2 win over Napoli secured third place and qualification for the Champions League play-off round. Berisha started the Coppa Italia final against Juventus on 20 May, which Lazio lost 2–1 after extra time, conceding the decisive goal in the 97th minute despite Berisha getting a touch to the shot. In the Supercoppa Italiana on 8 August, he was an unused substitute in Lazio's 2–0 defeat to Juventus at Shanghai Stadium in China.

==== 2015–16 season ====
On 18 August 2015, Berisha made his UEFA Champions League debut, keeping a clean sheet in Lazio's 1–0 home win over Bayer Leverkusen in the play-off round, but conceded three goals in a 3–0 defeat in the return leg a week later, eliminating Lazio from the competition and sending them into the Europa League group stage. He started Lazio's first two Serie A matches before returning to the bench following Federico Marchetti's recovery from a rib fracture, but regained his place in the Europa League, starting from the second group-stage matchday onward and conceding five goals in five matches as Lazio won four consecutive games before a 1–1 draw against Étienne in their final fixture secured top spot in the group with 14 points.

In December, Berisha started the Coppa Italia round of 16 in a 2–1 win over Udinese, helping Lazio reach the quarter-finals, before replacing the injured Marchetti three days later and making several important saves in a 2–1 away win over Serie A leaders Inter. He remained in goal throughout January 2016, keeping two clean sheets in five Serie A matches as Lazio recorded two wins and three draws, but the club were eliminated from the Coppa Italia following a 1–0 quarter-final defeat to Juventus. After Marchetti returned in February, Berisha made only one further appearance that season as Lazio exited the Europa League in the round of 16 and finished eighth in Serie A, missing out on European qualification for the following campaign.

After losing his place to Marchetti and facing competition from fellow Albanian Thomas Strakosha, who had returned from a loan spell in Serie B, Berisha sought regular first-team football and moved to Atalanta on loan at the end of the summer transfer window, remaining in Serie A.

=== Atalanta ===
==== Loan and historic 2016–17 season ====
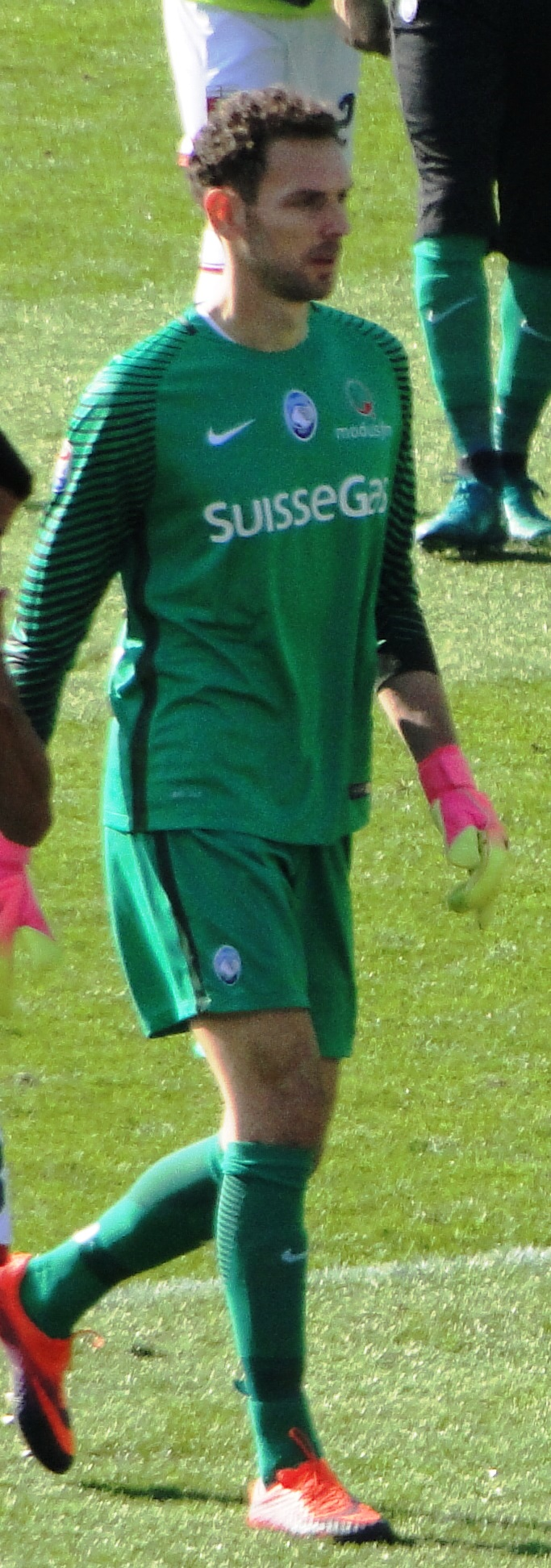
Berisha with Atalanta in 2016

On 31 August 2016, Berisha joined Atalanta during the start of the 2016–17 season on a one-year loan with an option to buy, initially arriving as a potential replacement for Marco Sportiello, whose proposed transfer to Fiorentina fell through on the same day. Initially regarded as Sportiello's backup, he was included in the matchday squad for the Serie A fixture against Torino on 11 September. He made his competitive debut a week later after Sportiello sustained an injury, starting in a 3–0 away defeat to Cagliari, conceding an early goal to Marco Borriello before denying him twice later in the first half and making further saves after the break, including turning a shot onto the post, although he could not prevent two further goals. Berisha retained his starting place after Sportiello's recovery, recording six clean sheets in eight matches as Atalanta won seven and drew one, including five consecutive victories that equalled the club's Serie A record and left them fourth with a club-record 25 points after 13 matches. In late November, he was diagnosed with a meniscus injury in his right knee and underwent surgery the following month, returning on 11 January 2017 to start in a 3–2 defeat to Juventus in the Coppa Italia round of 16.

On 25 February, Berisha kept a clean sheet in a 2–0 away win over Napoli, making several saves, including tipping a Dries Mertens free kick onto the crossbar and stopping a late effort from Leonardo Pavoletti, while Italian sports media praised his performance as "super" and credited him with a decisive role in the victory. He recorded another clean sheet on 5 March in a goalless draw against Fiorentina, making several important saves, including a first-half stop against Cristian Tello, and earning praise for his reflexes, positioning and handling of aerial balls. A week later, he conceded seven goals in a 7–1 away defeat to Inter; although he was not considered primarily responsible for Atalanta's collapse, he was criticised for conceding a penalty and Inter's final goal from a free kick.

Berisha finished the season with 26 league appearances, 11 clean sheets, 92 saves and 26 goals conceded, helping Atalanta finish fourth in Serie A, the club's highest league position at the time, and qualify for the UEFA Europa League group stage.

==== 2017–18 season ====
On 21 June 2017, Atalanta completed Berisha's permanent signing for a reported fee of €5 million. On 10 September, Berisha made two important late saves in a 2–1 victory over Sassuolo on matchday 3, helping Atalanta secure their first win in Serie A, and earning ratings of 7–8, as well as a place in Team of the Week. Four days later, he started in Atalanta's UEFA Europa League group-stage debut, making an early close-range save to preserve a clean sheet in a 3–0 win over Everton, the club's first European group-stage match in 26 years. In their next group-stage match against Lyon, he made several important saves, particularly in the second half in a 1–1 draw, earning an 8/10 rating. In the remaining group-stage matches, Berisha conceded once in each of the next three fixtures as Atalanta recorded a home win and an away draw against Apollon Limassol, followed by a 5–1 away victory over Everton to secure qualification for the knockout stage with a match to spare; Berisha concluded the campaign with a clean sheet in a 1–0 win over Lyon, as Atalanta finished unbeaten at the top of the group with 14 points, with him and Remo Freuler playing every available minute.

On 1 October, he saved a penalty from Paulo Dybala in the 84th minute of a 2–2 draw against Juventus, denying the Argentine his first penalty miss in Serie A. On 23 December, Berisha kept another clean sheet in a 2–0 away victory over Milan in Serie A, making several important saves to preserve the lead and earning praises for his reflexes. In the Coppa Italia, Berisha featured in a 2–1 quarter-final win over Napoli on 2 January 2018 before playing both legs of the semi-final, where Atalanta were eliminated by Juventus 2–0 on aggregate despite several saves from the goalkeeper, including against attempts by Mario Mandžukić and Douglas Costa. On 21 January, Berisha made a reflex save from a close-range header by José Callejón in a 1–0 defeat to Napoli, with Andrea Masiello clearing the rebound off the line, but could not prevent Dries Mertens from scoring the winner minutes later. On 22 February, he started in Atalanta's 1–1 draw against Borussia Dortmund in the second leg of the Europa League round of 32, making a late save from André Schürrle before an error on a Marco Reus shot allowed Marcel Schmelzer to equalise, sending Dortmund through 4–3 on aggregate. On 14 April, Berisha kept a clean sheet in a 0–0 draw against Inter, saving an attempt from Ivan Perišić and making another important stop from Éder's late free kick, with reports highlighting his reflexes and contribution to the result. He finished the Serie A season with 31 appearances, eight clean sheets and 34 goals conceded as Atalanta finished seventh and qualified for the UEFA Europa League second qualifying round.

==== 2018–19 season ====
In August 2018, Berisha started both legs of Atalanta's UEFA Europa League second qualifying round tie against Sarajevo, keeping a clean sheet in an 8–0 away win that secured progression and set a club record for its largest European away victory. He subsequently lost his starting place to Pierluigi Gollini, who featured in the remaining qualifying rounds as Atalanta advanced to the play-off round, where they were eliminated by Copenhagen on penalties. Berisha made his first Serie A appearances of the season in September as part of Gian Piero Gasperini's rotation, featuring in a 1–0 defeat to Cagliari before keeping a clean sheet in a 0–0 draw against Torino. He reclaimed his starting place in late October, keeping a clean sheet in a 3–0 win over Parma and earning positive ratings. On 4 November, he made three saves in a 2–1 away victory over Bologna, including a late stop against Rodrigo Palacio, earning a 7/10 rating. On 3 December, he made several saves in a 2–1 home defeat to Napoli, including a notable stop against Lorenzo Insigne that sent the ball onto the post, with match reports not attributing either goal to him. On 17 December, he kept a clean sheet in a 1–0 win over Lazio, making several saves against Ciro Immobile and Sergej Milinković-Savić, including tipping the latter's first-half header over the crossbar, and earning a 7/10 rating as Atalanta held on despite Lazio creating several clear chances.

On 30 January 2019, Berisha kept a clean sheet in the Coppa Italia quarter-finals as Atalanta defeated defending champions Juventus 3–0 to reach the semi-finals, earning praise for his reliability despite having few saves to make. He recorded another clean sheet on 4 February in a 1–0 away win over Cagliari, making an important second-half save as Atalanta moved into the UEFA Champions League places. A week later, he made an early save following a defensive error in a 2–1 victory over SPAL but conceded a goal a minute later before Atalanta came from behind to win. After a 2–0 away defeat to Torino on 23 February, Berisha was left out of the starting lineup for the remainder of the season, with manager Gasperini explaining that he had enjoyed an extended run as the starter and that it was now Gollini's turn, describing the two goalkeepers as comparable in ability and performance; Atalanta won 11 of their final 20 Serie A matches to finish third and qualify for the UEFA Champions League group stage for the first time in the club's history.

=== SPAL ===
On 6 July 2019, Berisha joined fellow Serie A club SPAL on a one-year loan with an option to buy. He established himself as the first-choice goalkeeper and made his debut on 18 August in a 3–1 victory over Feralpisalò in the third round of the Coppa Italia. A week later, he faced former club Atalanta in the Serie A opener, making several saves in a 3–2 defeat after SPAL surrendered a two-goal half-time lead. On 30 August, he made further saves in a 1–0 away defeat to Bologna, keeping the score level until the hosts scored the winner in the 93rd minute. On 15 September, he made an important save from Luis Alberto in a 2–1 comeback win over Lazio, earning a 7/10 rating. On 28 September, he made eight saves in a 2–0 away defeat to Juventus, limiting the margin of defeat. On 27 October, he made two late saves from Arkadiusz Milik in a 1–1 home draw against Napoli, credited decisive in helping SPAL avoid defeat. In the Coppa Italia, he conceded once in a 5–1 win over Lecce in the fourth round on 4 December before allowing three goals in a 3–0 defeat to Milan in the round of 16, which eliminated SPAL from the competition. On 21 December, he made several saves in a 2–1 away victory over Torino, helping SPAL secure their first away win of the season.

On 5 January 2020, Berisha made several saves in a 2–0 home defeat to Hellas Verona, keeping the scoreline close despite SPAL playing with ten men from late in the first half. On 20 January, he returned to the Stadio di Bergamo to face his former club Atalanta, making several saves, including a late stop, in a 2–1 comeback victory. On 22 February, he made several important saves in a 2–1 home defeat to league leaders Juventus, keeping SPAL in contention during the second half before the visitors secured the victory. On 8 March, he kept a clean sheet in a 1–0 away victory over Parma, making the only save required to preserve the lead as SPAL moved off the bottom of the table. On 20 June, as Serie A prepared to resume following its suspension due to the COVID-19 pandemic, Berisha fractured the fifth metacarpal in his right hand during training, ruling him out of SPAL's remaining 12 league matches, while manager Luigi Di Biagio said that the team would miss his contributions and leadership. In his absence, SPAL collected only two points and finished bottom of the table, while local media later described him as the team's most consistent performer before his injury and questioned how the season might have unfolded had he remained available. Berisha recorded the highest number of saves in Serie A, with 107 in total. On 1 September 2020, SPAL made Berisha's transfer permanent for €3.5 million, retaining him for their Serie B campaign.

He began the 2020–21 season with a clean sheet in the opening Serie B match against Monza on 25 September, saving a late penalty to secure a 0–0 draw, earning a 7.5/10 rating and being described as the match's hero. On 27 November, he tested positive for COVID-19, sidelining him for approximately two months. He returned on 14 January 2021, keeping a clean sheet in a 2–0 Coppa Italia round-of-16 victory over Sassuolo that sent SPAL to the quarter-finals for the first time since 1981. Ten days later, he made seven saves, including four from inside the penalty area, in a 1–1 Serie B draw against Cremonese, earning a 7.9/10 rating from Sofascore. Three days later, he made two saves from Álvaro Morata in the Coppa Italia quarter-final against Juventus but conceded four goals in a 4–0 defeat which ended SPAL's run in the competition. On 20 March, he made a decisive save in a 1–0 victory over Cittadella, denying a powerful shot in the 73rd minute to preserve the lead and secure the first win of Massimo Rastelli's tenure. In the final match of the season on 10 May, he made two important saves, early in the match and late in the first half, to preserve the lead in a 1–0 victory over Cremonese, but SPAL nevertheless finished ninth and missed the promotion play-offs after Brescia and Chievo also won their matches. Berisha ended the season with 27 appearances and received a 7.5/10 rating from local media, which described him as one of SPAL's standout performers and considered him a goalkeeper above the level of Serie B.

=== Torino ===
On 3 July 2021, Berisha joined Torino on loan with an obligation to buy, signing a three-year contract. He initially served as backup to first-choice Vanja Milinković-Savić under manager Ivan Jurić. He made his debut on 16 December in a 2–1 defeat to Sampdoria in the Coppa Italia second round, resulting in Torino's elimination. On 6 March 2022, following an injury to Milinković-Savić, Berisha made his Serie A debut, keeping a clean sheet in a 0–0 away draw against Bologna on matchday 28. A week later, he produced a strong performance in a 1–1 draw against Inter, making several saves as Torino held the lead until the 93rd minute and earning a 7.5/10 rating from La Gazzetta dello Sport. He retained his starting place after Milinković-Savić's return and kept another clean sheet in a 0–0 draw against Milan on 10 April, saving attempts from Davide Calabria and Sandro Tonali to help secure a point. In the remaining matches, he conceded once in three consecutive matches before keeping a clean sheet in a 1–0 away win over Hellas Verona, contributing to two wins and one draw to help Torino secure a mid-table finish with 50 points. In the end of the 2021–22 season, Torino decided to retain Berisha on a permanent basis.

At the start of the 2022–23 season, Berisha lost his starting position to Milinković-Savić, whom Jurić favoured following his pre-season performances and displays in the Coppa Italia. Berisha made no appearances during the first half of the season and requested a transfer in search of regular playing time, but remained at Torino after no suitable offer materialised during the winter transfer window. In February 2023, he was excluded from the matchday squads and trained separately from the first team, with Jurić stating that he had not accepted his role as second-choice goalkeeper. During the summer of 2023, Berisha was excluded from Torino's plans and omitted from the club's pre-season training camp before completing a move to Empoli in late August.

=== Empoli ===
On 29 August 2023, Berisha joined Empoli on a free transfer as a replacement for injured first-choice goalkeeper Elia Caprile, who was expected to be sidelined for around two months. He made his debut on 3 September in a 2–0 away defeat to Juventus in the 2023–24 Serie A, saving a penalty from Dušan Vlahović. The following week, he featured in a 7–0 away defeat to Roma, making several saves to limit the margin of defeat. On 23 October, he produced one of his strongest performances of the season in a 2–0 away victory over Fiorentina, making seven saves, five from inside the penalty area, receiving a 9.0 rating from SofaScore and being named man of the match by multiple outlets. On 12 November, he made several saves in a 1–0 away win over Napoli, including late stops against Khvicha Kvaratskhelia and Jesper Lindstrøm, and was again named man of the match.

By the halfway point of the season, Berisha had made 14 appearances, keeping four clean sheets as Empoli recorded three wins and a goalless draw, while in his other appearances, he conceded 25 goals, during which the team recorded two further draws, both 1–1, and eight defeats. After Caprile returned from injury in late 2023, Berisha was relegated to the bench after conceding 25 goals in 14 appearances, although he was credited with repaying the club's faith through a satisfactory level of performance. In March 2024, he sustained a pectoral muscle injury while on international duty with Albania, sidelining him until late May. Although Empoli reportedly considered retaining him as an experienced backup goalkeeper after securing their Serie A status, Berisha declined a contract renewal and left the club as a free agent in June.

=== BK Häcken ===
After nearly a year without a club, Berisha returned to Sweden, joining BK Häcken on 11 April 2025 during the 2025 Allsvenskan season. After three consecutive matches on the bench, he made his debut on 27 April, starting in a 1–1 home draw against Hammarby IF on matchday six; it marked his first competitive appearance since December 2023, following a period affected by injuries and free agency. He subsequently established himself as first-choice goalkeeper, making 21 league appearances, keeping six clean sheets and recording 56 saves from 87 shots on target while conceding 30 goal, as the club recorded seven wins, seven draws and seven defeats in his appearances and finished 10th, clear of the relegation zone. In the 2025 Svenska Cupen final on 29 May, Berisha kept a clean sheet through a goalless draw after extra time against Malmö FF, then saved two penalties and scored one himself in the shoot-out to help Häcken win 4–2 and claim the title; his performance earned praise by local media, with his saves and contribution to the shoot-out victory making him one of the match's key figures.

The cup victory secured Häcken a place in the 2025–26 UEFA Europa League first qualifying round, where Berisha kept a clean sheet in a 1–0 away win over Slovak side Spartak Trnava in the first leg on 10 July. In the return leg, he was affected by low sunlight as Spartak Trnava scored their opening goal, but Häcken advanced with a late equaliser to win 3–2 on aggregate. In the second qualifying round against Belgian side Anderlecht, Berisha saved a penalty and converted the decisive spot-kick in a 4–2 shoot-out victory after the tie ended 2–2 on aggregate, with Berisha praised as the hero of the tie. Two days later, he signed a two-year contract extension, keeping him at the club until 2027. In the third qualifying round, he kept a clean sheet and saved a late penalty in a 1–0 away win over Norwegian side Brann in the second leg, but Häcken were eliminated 2–1 on aggregate.

Häcken subsequently entered the Conference League play-off round, where Berisha started both legs against Romanian side CFR Cluj as Häcken won the first leg 7–2 and lost the return 1–0, advancing to the Conference League league phase. On 2 October, Berisha made his Conference League league-phase debut, keeping a clean sheet in a 0–0 away draw against Shelbourne, making several saves as Häcken were held to a point despite dominating possession. He featured in the club's next four matches, helping Häcken record two further draws, but missed their final fixture, a defeat that confirmed their elimination.

In early February 2026, Berisha revealed that recurring back problems had raised concerns about his future, restricting his training and requiring individual sessions, rehabilitation and consultations with specialists; he also said that artificial pitches aggravated the problem. He later disclosed that he had frequently played through pain while taking medication during the previous season and was considering retirement depending on the outcome of medical examinations. Despite his physical problems, Berisha appeared in the second half of a friendly in mid-February before returning to competitive action a week later in a Svenska Cupen match against IK Oddevold, replacing injured starting goalkeeper Andreas Linde in a 2–1 victory. On 1 March, Berisha played the full match in a 4–1 victory over Västerås SK in the cup, before his back problems recurred and sidelined him again.

By July, he had resumed individual training but continued to experience back problems. On 17 August, Berisha returned to action, keeping a clean sheet in a 1–0 home victory over Halmstads BK in the Allsvenskan. Four days later, he kept another clean sheet as Häcken defeated league leaders IK Sirius 3–0 away. On 1 November, Berisha extended his run without conceding a league goal to 659 minutes after keeping a clean sheet in a 1–0 win over IFK Göteborg, moving within 149 minutes of the Allsvenskan record of 808 minutes set by Håkan Svensson of Halmstads BK in 1999–2000.

== International career ==
Berisha represented Kosovo at youth level and made appearances for the senior team in unofficial friendlies between 2010 and 2011.

Berisha joined the Albania national team in May 2012 after receiving his first call-up from coach Gianni De Biasi for friendly matches, making his debut later that month by keeping clean sheet in a 1–0 victory over Iran.

On 1 June, Berisha acquired Albanian citizenship, making him eligible for competitive fixtures, and was subsequently included in the squad for the 2014 FIFA World Cup qualifiers. He made his competitive debut in Albania's fourth match of the qualifiers on 16 October, making several saves to keep his side ahead before half-time and helping secure a 1–0 home victory over Slovenia, Albania's first win against the team. Berisha established himself as Albania's first-choice goalkeeper and kept a clean sheet in a 1–0 away win over Norway on 22 March 2013, making a late save from Mohammed Abdellaoue to preserve the victory and move Albania into second place in the qualifying group, one point behind leaders Switzerland at the halfway stage of the campaign. Berisha featured throughout the second half of the qualifying campaign as Albania's form declined, with the team earning only two points from its five matches and dropping to second-bottom in the group, ultimately failing to qualify for the finals.

Berisha began the UEFA Euro 2016 qualifying campaign on 7 September 2014 with an effective performance in a 1–0 away win over Portugal, Albania's first victory over the team. On 11 October, Berisha made several saves in Albania's 1–1 draw with Denmark, including a save from a Simon Kjær header early in the match and a low stop to deny Lasse Vibe a late winner in stoppage time. Three days later, Berisha featured in the matchday 3 fixture against Serbia, which was abandoned in the 42nd minute following crowd disturbances involving flares and a pitch invasion by home supporters; following appeals by both federations, the Court of Arbitration for Sport awarded Albania a 3–0 victory in July 2015, overturning UEFA's initial decision while upholding Serbia's point deduction. On 4 September, Berisha made several saves to keep the hosts at bay and preserve a clean sheet in a 0–0 away draw against Denmark, helping Albania maintain their position in the qualifying group. Berisha continued to perform well in the next two matches, despite Albania suffering narrow defeats to Portugal and Serbia, both decided by stoppage-time goals. On 11 October, he kept a clean sheet in the decisive final qualifier, a 3–0 away win over Armenia that secured Albania's qualification for European finals, the country's first major tournament. Berisha concluded as ever-present throughout the whole qualifying campaign, playing every available minute across all eight matches, while recorded a total of 17 saves from 22 shots on target.

Berisha was named in the Euro 2016 final 23-man squad on 31 May 2016. Berisha retained his place as Albania's first-choice goalkeeper and made his major tournament debut on 11 June in the Group A opener against Switzerland, conceding an early goal after coming off his line unsuccessfully to deal with a corner before making several saves to keep Albania in contention despite playing with ten men for much of the match in a 1–0 defeat. Berisha featured in Albania's second group-stage match against France on 15 June, helping his side remain level until the closing stages as the hosts struggled to create clear chances and recorded only two shots on target, both of which resulted in goals in the 90th minute and stoppage time, as Albania suffered a 2–0 defeat despite a disciplined defensive performance. In the final group-stage match, Berisha made several saves to keep a clean sheet in a 1–0 victory over Romania on 19 June, securing Albania's first-ever win at a major international tournament and their first victory over Romania since 1948, keeping their hopes of reaching the knockout stage alive. Albania were ultimately eliminated after finishing as the lowest-ranked third-placed team.

Berisha remained regular starter in Albania's 2018 FIFA World Cup qualifying campaign helping to deal with an early attack before conceding an equaliser following a defensive error in the opening match against Macedonia on 5 September 2016, suspended by heavy rain at 1–1 and completed the following day, when Albania secured a 2–1 victory through a late goal. Berisha kept a clean sheet in Albania's 2–0 away victory over Liechtenstein on 6 October, as the team secured its second consecutive win in the qualifiers and moved to the top of Group G, where Berisha was rated 7.2 and the victory left Albania with six points from their opening two matches. Four days later, Berisha made several important saves to keep Spain scoreless in the first half, including a stop to deny a close goal in the 18th minute, but a misplaced clearance early in the second half allowed Spain to open the scoring before a second goal followed eight minutes later in a 2–0 defeat that cost Albania top spot in the group; despite his error, contemporary Albanian coverage acknowledged his first-half saves and credited him with preventing a heavier loss. On 12 November, Berisha was sent off in the first half of Albania's home qualifier against Israel for headbutting forward Eran Zahavi in the penalty area resulting in an unusual penalty against, which was saved, but Albania were reduced to nine players and lost 3–0. The match marked Berisha's 41st consecutive appearance for Albania since becoming the team's first-choice goalkeeper in October 2012, setting a national record for consecutive appearances. On 19 December, FIFA suspended Berisha for two matches and fined him 5,000 Swiss francs for the incident. Berisha returned in September 2017 as a starter, keeping a clean sheet in a 2–0 win over Liechtenstein new head coach Christian Panucci debut. Berisha played a key role in Albania's 1–1 away draw against Macedonia three days later, making several important saves in the closing stages, to help his side secure a point after the hosts had dominated much of the match. On 6 October, Berisha captained Albania for the first time in a competitive match, in the away qualifier against Spain, in accordance with new head coach Panucci's policy of appointing the player with the most appearances; Albania lost 3–0 and were mathematically eliminated from the competition.

Berisha later faced increased competition for Albania's starting goalkeeper position from the emerging Thomas Strakosha, while also struggling for regular playing time at Atalanta, contributing to his loss of first-choice status during the inaugural UEFA Nations League, making only one appearance in the final group match against Scotland on 17 November 2018, when Albania were reduced to ten players and lost 4–0 at home. After joining SPAL from Atalanta in 2019, Berisha regained his place as Albania's first-choice goalkeeper under new head coach Edoardo Reja during the UEFA Euro 2020 qualifying campaign, featuring in most of the matches despite temporarily losing his place midway through the campaign before returning to the starting lineup, and recording three clean sheets that contributed to Albania's victories.

In the 2020–21 UEFA Nations League C, Berisha initially began as a substitute before reclaiming his first-choice status, where was also reinstated captain and initially kept clean sheets in two goalless draws in October 2020. On 15 November, Berisha conceded a goal from near the halfway line in a 3–1 victory over Kazakhstan, which attracted media attention and criticism from football analysts, including former Manchester United midfielder Roy Keane, while the goalkeeper acknowledged that he had been positioned too far off his line. Three days later, Berisha captained Albania in a decisive 3–2 victory over Belarus, helping secure first place in their group and promotion to League B.

Berisha was mostly a starter during the 2022 FIFA World Cup qualifying campaign, keeping three clean-sheets, most notably in both home and away 1–0 victories over Hungary, earning praises for his efforts. Albania achieved a total of 18 points—their highest-ever tally in a World Cup qualifying group—earning wins over three below level opponents, but failing to secure points against group favourites England and Poland, ultimately finishing third in Group I, narrowly missing out on a play-off spot by two points to Poland.

Under new head coach Sylvinho, Berisha lost the Albania captaincy at the start of the UEFA Euro 2024 qualifying campaign. Although he began the campaign as a substitute, Berisha went on to start most of the group's matches, keeping two clean sheets across five appearances and conceding only three goals in total as Albania was unbeaten in Berisha's appearances. On 12 October 2023, Berisha kept a clean sheet in Albania's 3–0 victory over the Czech Republic, making several interventions as the team strengthened its position to qualify for the final tournament; he received a Sofascore rating of 8.6, the highest among the players in the match. Albania topped their qualifying group for the first time in history, finishing with 15 points—level with the Czech Republic but ahead on head-to-head results—thus qualifying for the final tournament of a UEFA European Championship for only the second time.

In June 2024, Berisha was named in Sylvinho's final 26-man squad for UEFA Euro 2024, hosted in Germany. Before the tournament, he captained Albania in a 3–0 friendly victory over Liechtenstein on 3 June, keeping his 36th clean sheet, extending his national record. He did not feature at the final tournament, with Thomas Strakosha preferred as the starting goalkeeper throughout, as Albania finished bottom of their group with one point. His lack of playing time was later reported as contributing to a fallout with Sylvinho, after which Berisha was no longer called up during Sylvinho's tenure. In September 2024, Sylvinho said Berisha's exclusion from the national team was due to his lack of a club and match fitness, while Albanian media also reported dissatisfaction among players who had been involved in the qualifying campaign, including Berisha.

Following Sylvinho's departure in May 2026, Berisha was recalled to the national team by new head coach Rolando Maran in September 2026 for the start of the 2026–27 UEFA Nations League C. He made his first appearance for Albania in more than two years in the 2–0 victory over Belarus on 26 September, in the opening match of the Nations League, keeping a clean sheet as Albanian media described his return as an emotional comeback for the experienced goalkeeper. On 3 October, Berisha was sent off in the 22nd minute in a 2–1 defeat to Finland, after a misplaced pass left him attempting to stop an opposing attacker outside the penalty area, leaving Albania with ten men; Finland equalised from the resulting free kick four minutes later before scoring the winner in the 71st minute.

== Style of play ==
Berisha is noted for his height (1.94 m), reach and reflexes, attributes that assist him in aerial duels and one-on-one situations. He is also an authoritative organiser of his defence and communicates frequently with his teammates, traits that have been remarked upon since his early years at Kalmar. He stated that his favourite player and role model is the Dutch goalkeeper Edwin van der Sar. Unusually for a goalkeeper, Berisha has frequently taken and converted penalties. He records four goals from the penalty spot during his spell at Kalmar FF (with one recorded penalty missed in his career overview), underlining his rare dual role as both shot-stopper and spot-kick taker. Media coverage of key cup matches has emphasised Berisha's composure in high-pressure penalty situations. For example, contemporary reports of a Swedish Cup final noted that he "saved two penalties and one he scored himself", a sequence that was widely reported as decisive in the outcome. In interviews Berisha has described how earlier team-mates and coaches influenced his role as a penalty taker. After the cup final he said: "I learned these from Henke. He took penalties at Kalmar and after a match we played against Malmo, it was almost the same situation as in the final. It was Nanne who at that time said that I should become a penalty taker after I had scored many goals in training." Contemporaneous reportage from Kalmar's move to Lazio described him as "a fast-reacting goalkeeper who likes to verbally organise the defence."

== Controversies ==
On 31 July 2013, ChievoVerona announced that it had signed Berisha, but Berisha denied signing a contract, stating that he had only reached an agreement with the club. After Berisha signed for Lazio, Chievo announced on 5 September that it had referred the matter to FIFA. On 11 September, Lazio president Claudio Lotito stated that Berisha had been signed in accordance with the transfer regulations. On 14 September, Chievo sporting director Giovanni Sartori accused Berisha of changing his decision in favour of Lazio's offer. The dispute resurfaced in January 2014, when reports linked it to Lazio's search for another goalkeeper during the winter transfer window. On 31 January, further reports stated that Berisha could face a three-month suspension in connection with the disputed contract.

On 5 February 2014, Sartori requested that the case be closed and the accusations against Berisha dropped. On 20 March, Kalmar FF manager Svante Samuelsson stated that the transfer of Berisha from the Swedish club had been conducted regularly. On 28 June, reports stated that the case could be closed because FIFA had not yet reached a decision.

In January 2015, the dispute resurfaced in connection with Berisha's registration with Chievo and Lazio; La Gazzetta dello Sport reported that the case concerned the alleged registration of the player with both clubs during the same transfer period. In February, Berisha agreed to a settlement involving a 10-day suspension and a €15,000 fine, which was formalised by the FIGC on 19 March 2015.

== Personal life ==
Berisha was born in Pristina, Kosovo, and is of Albanian ethnicity. He is a cousin of Drilon Berisha, a former footballer who played for the Kosovan club Prishtina and the Armenian club Ulisses. In January 2013, he revealed that he had applied for Swedish citizenship after residing in the country for five years since joining Kalmar FF from his hometown club 2 Korriku, stating that acquiring Swedish nationality would allow him to hold triple citizenship (Kosovo, Albania and Sweden) and could facilitate his future career in European football as an EU player, describing it as "a step forward for my professional future". Following Albania's historic participation at UEFA Euro 2016, Berisha was among the members of the national team who were issued diplomatic passports by the Albanian government in recognition of their achievement. In May 2024, Berisha announced the birth of his first child, a son named Edgar, through a post on social media.

== Career statistics ==
=== Club ===
As of match played 8 November 2026

Appearances and goals by club, season and competition
Club	Season	League			National cup		Europe		Other		Total	
Club	Season	Division	Apps	Goals	Apps	Goals	Apps	Goals	Apps	Goals	Apps	Goals
2 Korriku	2007–08	First League of Kosovo					—		—			
Kalmar FF	2008	Allsvenskan	0	0	0	0	0	0	—		0	0
Kalmar FF	2010	Allsvenskan	14	0	1	0	—		—		15	0
Kalmar FF	2011	Allsvenskan	24	0	3	0	—		—		27	0
Kalmar FF	2012	Allsvenskan	30	1	4	0	6 (Note: Appearances in UEFA Europa League)	1	—		40	2
Kalmar FF	2013	Allsvenskan	22	2	—		—		—		22	2
Kalmar FF	Total		90	3	8	0	6	1	—		104	4
Lindsdals IF (loan)	2009	Swedish division 2	14	0	—		—		—		14	0
Lazio	2013–14	Serie A	17	0	2	0	4	0	—		23	0
Lazio	2014–15	Serie A	10	0	7	0	—		—		17	0
Lazio	2015–16	Serie A	11	0	2	0	7 (Note: Two appearances in UEFA Champions League, five appearances in UEFA Europa League)	0	0	0	20	0
Lazio	Total		38	0	11	0	11	0	0	0	60	0
Atalanta	2016–17	Serie A	26	0	1	0	—		—		27	0
Atalanta	2017–18	Serie A	31	0	3	0	8	0	—		42	0
Atalanta	2018–19	Serie A	18	0	2	0	2	0	—		22	0
Atalanta	Total		75	0	6	0	10	0	—		91	0
SPAL	2019–20	Serie A	26	0	3	0	—		—		29	0
SPAL	2020–21	Serie B	25	0	2	0	—		—		27	0
SPAL	Total		51	0	5	0	—		—		56	0
Torino (loan)	2021–22	Serie A	10	0	1	0	—		—		11	0
Torino	2022–23	Serie A	0	0	0	0	—		—		0	0
Torino	Total		10	0	1	0	—		—		11	0
Empoli	2023–24	Serie A	14	0	0	0	—		—		14	0
BK Häcken	2025	Allsvenskan	21	0	1	0	13	0	—		35	0
BK Häcken	2026	Allsvenskan	11	0	2	0	—		—		13	0
BK Häcken	Total		32	0	3	0	13	0	—		48	0
Career total			300	3	33	0	30	1	0	0	367	4

=== International ===
As of match played 15 November 2026

Appearances and goals by national team and year
National team	Year	Apps	Goals
Albania	2012	4	0
Albania	2013	10	0
Albania	2014	9	0
Albania	2015	8	0
Albania	2016	12	0
Albania	2017	5	0
Albania	2018	5	0
Albania	2019	6	0
Albania	2020	5	0
Albania	2021	6	0
Albania	2022	5	0
Albania	2023	5	0
Albania	2024	1	0
Albania	2025	0	0
Albania	2026	4	0
Total		85	0

== Honours ==
Kalmar FF

- Allsvenskan: 2008

BK Häcken

- Svenska Cupen: 2024–25

Individual

- Allsvenskan Goalkeeper of the Year: 2013
- Serie A Foreign Goalkeeper of the Year: 2013–14
