= Itapitanga =

Municipality of Bahia, Brazil

Coordinates: 14.4228°S 39.565°W

- Municipality
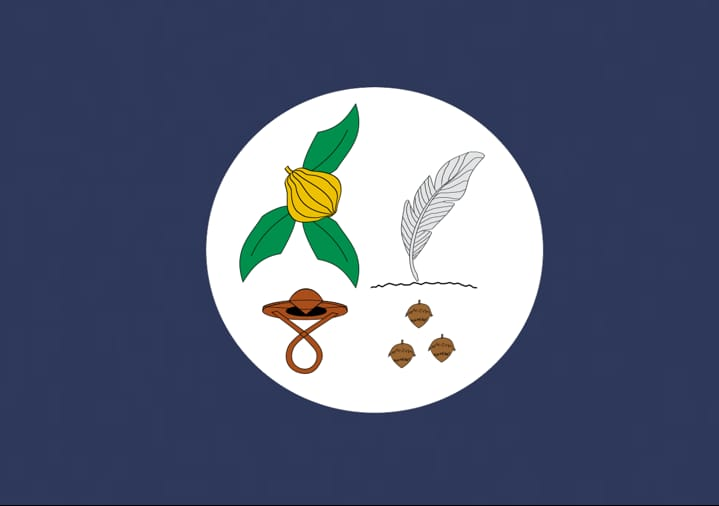
- Flag
- Interactive map of Itapitanga
- Country: Brazil
- Region: Nordeste
- State: Bahia

Population (2020)
  - Total: 10,298
- Time zone: UTC−3 (BRT)

Itapitanga is a municipality in the state of Bahia in the North-East region of Brazil.

== See also ==
- List of municipalities in Bahia
