= 2018–19 UEFA Europa League qualifying =

Union of European Football Associations matches

The 2018–19 UEFA Europa League qualifying phase and play-off round began on 26 June and ended on 30 August 2018.

A total of 178 teams competed in the qualifying system of the 2018–19 UEFA Europa League, which included the qualifying phase and the play-off round, with 35 teams in Champions Path and 143 teams in Main Path. The 21 winners in the play-off round (8 from Champions Path, 13 from Main Path) advanced to the group stage, to join the 17 teams that entered in the group stage, the 6 losers of the Champions League play-off round (4 from Champions Path, 2 from League Path), and the 4 League Path losers of the Champions League third qualifying round.

== Teams ==
=== Champions Path ===
The Champions Path included all league champions which were eliminated from the Champions Path qualifying phase of the Champions League, and consisted of the following rounds:

- Second qualifying round (18 teams): 18 teams which entered in this round (3 losers of the Champions League preliminary round and 15 of the 16 losers of the Champions League first qualifying round).
- Third qualifying round (20 teams): 11 teams which entered in this round (1 loser of the Champions League first qualifying round which receives a bye and 10 losers of the Champions League second qualifying round), and 9 winners of the second qualifying round.
- Play-off round (16 teams): 6 teams which entered in this round (losers of the Champions League third qualifying round), and 10 winners of the third qualifying round.

Below are the participating teams (with their 2018 UEFA club coefficients), grouped by their starting rounds.

Key to colours
Winners of play-off round advance to group stage

Play-off round
Team	Coeff.
(Scotland) Celtic	31.000
(Kazakhstan) Astana	21.750
(Azerbaijan) Qarabağ	20.500
(Sweden) Malmö FF	14.000
(North Macedonia) Shkëndija	3.500
(Slovakia) Spartak Trnava	3.500

Third qualifying round
Team	Coeff.
(Bulgaria) Ludogorets Razgrad	37.000
(Poland) Legia Warsaw	24.500
(Moldova) Sheriff Tiraspol	14.750
(Denmark) Midtjylland	11.500
(Israel) Hapoel Be'er Sheva	10.000
(Norway) Rosenborg	9.000
(Finland) HJK	8.000
(Albania) Kukësi	4.250
(Romania) CFR Cluj	4.090
(Lithuania) Sūduva	2.000
(Republic of Ireland) Cork City	1.750

Second qualifying round
Team	Coeff.
(Cyprus) APOEL	27.000
(Wales) The New Saints	5.000
(Bosnia and Herzegovina) Zrinjski Mostar	3.750
(Luxembourg) F91 Dudelange	3.500
(Malta) Valletta	3.250
(Faroe Islands) Víkingur Gøta	3.000
(Northern Ireland) Crusaders	3.000
(Slovenia) Olimpija Ljubljana	2.900
(Andorra) FC Santa Coloma	2.750
(Gibraltar) Lincoln Red Imps	2.750
(Armenia) Alashkert	2.500
(Montenegro) Sutjeska	2.500
(Latvia) Spartaks Jūrmala	1.750
(San Marino) La Fiorita	1.750
(Iceland) Valur	1.650
(Estonia) Flora	1.250
(Georgia (country)) Torpedo Kutaisi	1.000
(Kosovo) Drita	0.000

Notes

1. ^{Q3} Losers of Champions League third qualifying round (Champions Path).
2. ^{Q2} Losers of Champions League second qualifying round (Champions Path).
3. ^{Q1 Bye} Losers of Champions League first qualifying round which receive a bye to the Europa League third qualifying round.
4. ^{Q1} Losers of Champions League first qualifying round.
5. ^{PR F} Losers of Champions League preliminary round final.
6. ^{PR SF} Losers of Champions League preliminary round semi-finals.

=== Main Path ===
The Main Path included all cup winners and league non-champions which did not qualify directly for the group stage, and consisted of the following rounds:

- Preliminary round (14 teams): 14 teams which entered in this round.
- First qualifying round (94 teams): 87 teams which entered in this round, and 7 winners of the preliminary round.
- Second qualifying round (74 teams): 27 teams which entered in this round, and 47 winners of the first qualifying round.
- Third qualifying round (52 teams): 15 teams which entered in this round (including 2 League Path losers of the Champions League second qualifying round), and 37 winners of the second qualifying round.
- Play-off round (26 teams): 26 winners of the third qualifying round.

Below are the participating teams (with their 2018 UEFA club coefficients), grouped by their starting rounds.

Key to colours
Winners of play-off round advance to group stage

Third qualifying round
Team	Coeff.
(Russia) Zenit Saint Petersburg	78.000
(Switzerland) Basel	71.000
(Greece) Olympiacos	54.000
(Portugal) Braga	30.500
(Belgium) Gent	27.000
(Netherlands) Feyenoord	21.500
(Austria) Rapid Wien	21.500
(Croatia) Rijeka	15.500
(Ukraine) Zorya Luhansk	9.000
(Turkey) İstanbul Başakşehir	8.500
(Austria) Sturm Graz	6.570
(Switzerland) Luzern	6.040
(Czech Republic) Sigma Olomouc	6.035
(Denmark) Brøndby	5.190
(Romania) Universitatea Craiova	4.090

Second qualifying round
Team	Coeff.
(Spain) Sevilla	113.000
(Turkey) Beşiktaş	57.000
(Czech Republic) Sparta Prague	34.500
(Romania) FCSB	27.500
(Belgium) Genk	27.000
(Netherlands) AZ	25.000
(Germany) RB Leipzig	17.000
(England) Burnley	15.921
(Italy) Atalanta	15.249
(France) Bordeaux	11.283
(Russia) Ufa	10.676
(Portugal) Rio Ave	9.449
(Greece) Asteras Tripolis	9.000
(Ukraine) Mariupol	8.226
(Croatia) Hajduk Split	7.000
(Austria) Flyeralarm Admira	6.570
(Austria) LASK	6.570
(Switzerland) St. Gallen	6.040
(Netherlands) Vitesse	6.000
(Greece) Atromitos	5.720
(Israel) Hapoel Haifa	4.350
(Cyprus) AEK Larnaca	4.310
(Poland) Jagiellonia Białystok	4.025
(Scotland) Aberdeen	4.000
(Sweden) Djurgårdens IF	3.995
(Belarus) Dynamo Brest	3.725
(Norway) Lillestrøm	3.485

First qualifying round
Team	Coeff.
(Denmark) Copenhagen	34.000
(Slovenia) Maribor	22.500
(Israel) Maccabi Tel Aviv	22.500
(Serbia) Partizan	17.000
(Norway) Molde	12.500
(Cyprus) Apollon Limassol	10.000
(Belarus) Dinamo Minsk	8.000
(Poland) Lech Poznań	7.000
(Iceland) FH	5.500
(Republic of Ireland) Dundalk	5.500
(Lithuania) Žalgiris	5.500
(Azerbaijan) Gabala	5.250
(Croatia) Osijek	5.200
(Denmark) Nordsjælland	5.190
(North Macedonia) Vardar	5.000
(Slovakia) Trenčín	5.000
(Slovakia) Slovan Bratislava	5.000
(Israel) Beitar Jerusalem	4.350
(Cyprus) Anorthosis Famagusta	4.310
(Georgia (country)) Dinamo Tbilisi	4.250
(Romania) Viitorul Constanța	4.090
(Poland) Górnik Zabrze	4.025
(Sweden) AIK	4.000
(Estonia) Nõmme Kalju	4.000
(Sweden) BK Häcken	3.995
(Bulgaria) Levski Sofia	3.825
(Azerbaijan) Keşla	3.825
(Azerbaijan) Neftçi	3.825
(Bulgaria) Slavia Sofia	3.825
(Bulgaria) CSKA Sofia	3.825
(Latvia) Ventspils	3.750
(Serbia) Radnički Niš	3.750
(Serbia) Spartak Subotica	3.750
(Belarus) Shakhtyor Soligorsk	3.725
(Scotland) Rangers	3.725
(Scotland) Hibernian	3.725
(Kazakhstan) Kairat	3.625
(Kazakhstan) Irtysh	3.625
(Kazakhstan) Tobol	3.625
(Luxembourg) Fola Esch	3.500
(Norway) Sarpsborg 08	3.485
(North Macedonia) Rabotnicki	3.250
(Bosnia and Herzegovina) Sarajevo	3.250
(Slovenia) Domžale	3.000
(Montenegro) Titograd Podgorica	3.000
(Bosnia and Herzegovina) Željezničar	3.000
(Slovenia) Rudar Velenje	2.900
(Liechtenstein) Vaduz	2.750
(Estonia) FCI Levadia	2.750
(Moldova) Milsami Orhei	2.750
(Iceland) Stjarnan	2.750
(Hungary) Ferencváros	2.500
(Northern Ireland) Cliftonville	2.500
(Slovakia) DAC Dunajská Streda	2.425
(Montenegro) Budućnost Podgorica	2.250
(Bosnia and Herzegovina) Široki Brijeg	2.250
(Armenia) Pyunik	2.250
(Moldova) Zaria Bălți	2.000
(Albania) Partizani	2.000
(Georgia (country)) Chikhura Sachkhere	2.000
(Moldova) Petrocub Hîncești	2.000
(Montenegro) Rudar Pljevlja	1.750
(Albania) Laçi	1.700
(Albania) Luftëtari	1.700
(Iceland) ÍBV	1.650
(Hungary) Honvéd	1.625
(Hungary) Újpest	1.625
(Latvia) Liepāja	1.500
(North Macedonia) Shkupi	1.500
(Finland) Lahti	1.380
(Finland) KuPS	1.380
(Finland) Ilves	1.380
(Republic of Ireland) Shamrock Rovers	1.340
(Republic of Ireland) Derry City	1.340
(Georgia (country)) Samtredia	1.250
(Latvia) Riga	1.125
(Estonia) Narva Trans	1.100
(Lithuania) Stumbras	1.075
(Armenia) Gandzasar Kapan	0.975
(Armenia) Banants	0.975
(Malta) Balzan	0.900
(Luxembourg) Progrès Niederkorn	0.875
(Luxembourg) Racing Union	0.875
(Northern Ireland) Coleraine	0.850
(Northern Ireland) Glenavon	0.850
(Wales) Connah's Quay Nomads	0.775
(Faroe Islands) NSÍ	0.750

Preliminary round
Team	Coeff.
(Malta) Birkirkara	2.750
(Lithuania) Trakai	1.750
(Gibraltar) Europa	1.500
(Faroe Islands) B36	1.500
(San Marino) Folgore	1.250
(Wales) Bala Town	1.000
(Malta) Gżira United	0.900
(Wales) Cefn Druids	0.775
(Andorra) Sant Julià	0.750
(Faroe Islands) KÍ	0.750
(Gibraltar) St Joseph's	0.600
(Andorra) Engordany	0.266
(Kosovo) Prishtina	0.250
(San Marino) Tre Fiori	0.099

Notes

1. ^{CL} Losers of Champions League second qualifying round (League Path).

== Format ==
Each tie was played over two legs, with each team playing one leg at home. The team that scored more goals on aggregate over the two legs advanced to the next round. If the aggregate score was level, the away goals rule was applied, i.e. the team that scored more goals away from home over the two legs advanced. If away goals were also equal, then extra time was played. The away goals rule was again applied after extra time, i.e. if there were goals scored during extra time and the aggregate score was still level, the visiting team advanced by virtue of more away goals scored. If no goals were scored during extra time, the tie was decided by penalty shoot-out.

For the Champions Path, in the draws for each round, teams (whose identity was not known at the time of the draws) were divided into seeded and unseeded pots, which may contain different numbers of teams, based on the following principles:

- In the second qualifying round draw, 15 of the 16 losers of the Champions League first qualifying round (excluding 1 team which receives a bye to the third qualifying round as decided by an additional draw held after the Champions League first qualifying round draw) were seeded, and the three losers of the Champions League preliminary round were unseeded.
- In the third qualifying round draw, the ten losers of the Champions League second qualifying round were seeded, and the loser of the first qualifying round which receives a bye (whose identity was known at the time of the draw) and the nine winners of the second qualifying round were unseeded.
- In the play-off round draw, the six losers of the Champions League third qualifying round were seeded, and the ten winners of the third qualifying round were unseeded.

In the beginning of the draws, a seeded team was drawn against an unseeded team, with the order of legs in each tie decided by draw, until one of the pots was empty. Afterwards, the remaining teams from the non-empty pot were drawn against each other, with the order of legs in each tie decided by draw.

For the Main Path, in the draws for each round, teams were seeded based on their UEFA club coefficients at the beginning of the season, with the teams divided into seeded and unseeded pots containing the same number of teams. A seeded team was drawn against an unseeded team, with the order of legs in each tie decided by draw. As the identity of the winners of the previous round was not known at the time of the draws, the seeding was carried out under the assumption that the team with the higher coefficient of an undecided tie would advance to this round, which meant that if the team with the lower coefficient advanced, it simply took the seeding of its opponent.

Prior to the draws, UEFA may form "groups" in accordance with the principles set by the Club Competitions Committee, but they are purely for convenience of the draw and do not resemble any real groupings in the sense of the competition. Teams from the same association or from associations with political conflicts as decided by UEFA may not be drawn into the same tie. After the draws, the order of legs of a tie may be reversed by UEFA due to scheduling or venue conflicts.

== Schedule ==
The schedule was as follows (all draws were held at the UEFA headquarters in Nyon, Switzerland).

Qualifying phase and play-off round schedule
Round	Draw date	First leg	Second leg
Preliminary round	12 June 2018	28 June 2018	5 July 2018
First qualifying round	19 June 2018 (Champions Path); 20 June 2018 (Main Path)	12 July 2018	19 July 2018
Second qualifying round	19 June 2018 (Champions Path); 20 June 2018 (Main Path)	26 July 2018	2 August 2018
Third qualifying round	23 July 2018	9 August 2018	16 August 2018
Play-off round	6 August 2018	23 August 2018	30 August 2018

Matches may also be played on Tuesdays or Wednesdays instead of the regular Thursdays due to scheduling conflicts.

== Preliminary round ==
The draw for the preliminary round was held on 12 June 2018, 13:00 CEST.

=== Seeding ===
A total of 14 teams were involved in the preliminary round draw. Seven teams were seeded and seven teams were unseeded. Teams from the same association could not be drawn into the same tie, and if such a pairing was drawn or was set to be drawn in the final tie, the second team drawn in the current tie would be moved to the next tie.

Seeded	Unseeded
(Malta) Birkirkara; (Lithuania) Trakai; (Gibraltar) Europa; (Faroe Islands) B36; (San Marino) Folgore; (Wales) Bala Town; (Malta) Gżira United	(Wales) Cefn Druids; (Andorra) Sant Julià; (Faroe Islands) KÍ; (Gibraltar) St Joseph's; (Andorra) Engordany; (Kosovo) Prishtina; (San Marino) Tre Fiori

=== Summary ===
The first legs were played on 26 and 28 June, and the second legs on 5 July 2018.

Team 1	Agg.	Team 2	1st leg	2nd leg
Europa (Gibraltar)	1–6	(Kosovo) Prishtina	1–1	0–5
Sant Julià (Andorra)	1–4	(Malta) Gżira United	0–2	1–2
Engordany (Andorra)	3–2	(San Marino) Folgore	2–1	1–1
B36 (Faroe Islands)	2–2 (4–2 p)	(Gibraltar) St Joseph's	1–1	1–1 (a.e.t.)
Birkirkara (Malta)	2–3	(Faroe Islands) KÍ	1–1	1–2
Tre Fiori (San Marino)	3–1	(Wales) Bala Town	3–0	0–1
Cefn Druids (Wales)	1–2	(Lithuania) Trakai	1–1	0–1

== First qualifying round ==
The draw for the first qualifying round was held on 20 June 2018, 12:00 CEST.

=== Seeding ===
A total of 94 teams were involved in the first qualifying round draw: 87 teams entering in this round, and the seven winners of the preliminary round. They were divided into nine groups: seven of ten teams, where five teams were seeded and five teams were unseeded, and two of twelve teams, where six teams were seeded and six teams were unseeded. Numbers were pre-assigned for each team by UEFA so that the draw could be held in one run for all groups with ten teams and one run for all groups with twelve teams.

Group 1		Group 2		Group 3	
Seeded	Unseeded	Seeded	Unseeded	Seeded	Unseeded
(Norway) Molde (2); (Lithuania) Žalgiris (1); (Estonia) Nõmme Kalju (3); (Bulgaria) Slavia Sofia (5); (Luxembourg) Fola Esch (4)	(Iceland) Stjarnan (10); (Faroe Islands) KÍ (7); (Kosovo) Prishtina (8); (Finland) Ilves (9); (Northern Ireland) Glenavon (6)	(Cyprus) Apollon Limassol (5); (Azerbaijan) Gabala (2); (Georgia (country)) Dinamo Tbilisi (3); (Scotland) Rangers (4); (Slovenia) Domžale (1)	(Slovakia) DAC Dunajská Streda (10); (Bosnia and Herzegovina) Široki Brijeg (7); (North Macedonia) Shkupi (8); (Lithuania) Stumbras (9); (Luxembourg) Progrès Niederkorn (6)	(Slovenia) Maribor (1); (Slovakia) Trenčín (2); (Romania) Viitorul Constanța (3); (Azerbaijan) Neftçi (4); (Kazakhstan) Tobol (5)	(Montenegro) Budućnost Podgorica (6); (Albania) Partizani (7); (Hungary) Újpest (8); (Georgia (country)) Samtredia (9); (Luxembourg) Racing Union (10)
Group 4		Group 5		Group 6	
Seeded	Unseeded	Seeded	Unseeded	Seeded	Unseeded
(Belarus) Dinamo Minsk (3); (North Macedonia) Vardar (2); (Poland) Górnik Zabrze (1); (Serbia) Spartak Subotica (4); (Montenegro) Titograd Podgorica (5)	(Armenia) Pyunik (6); (Moldova) Zaria Bălți (7); (Faroe Islands) B36 (9); (Republic of Ireland) Derry City (10); (Northern Ireland) Coleraine (8)	(Iceland) FH (1); (Denmark) Nordsjælland (2); (Sweden) AIK (3); (Latvia) Ventspils (4); (Belarus) Shakhtyor Soligorsk (5)	(Northern Ireland) Cliftonville (6); (Albania) Luftëtari (8); (Finland) Lahti (7); (Republic of Ireland) Shamrock Rovers (10); (Wales) Connah's Quay Nomads (9)	(Israel) Maccabi Tel Aviv (2); (Croatia) Osijek (1); (Cyprus) Anorthosis Famagusta (4); (Kazakhstan) Kairat (5); (Bosnia and Herzegovina) Sarajevo (3)	(Hungary) Ferencváros (6); (Moldova) Petrocub Hîncești (7); (Albania) Laçi (8); (Andorra) Engordany (9); (Armenia) Banants (10)
Group 7		Group 8		Group 9	
Seeded	Unseeded	Seeded	Unseeded	Seeded	Unseeded
(Serbia) Partizan (1); (Slovakia) Slovan Bratislava (2); (Azerbaijan) Keşla (3); (Bulgaria) CSKA Sofia (4); (North Macedonia) Rabotnicki (5)	(Moldova) Milsami Orhei (6); (Montenegro) Rudar Pljevlja (7); (Hungary) Honvéd (9); (Latvia) Riga (8); (Malta) Balzan (10)	(Poland) Lech Poznań (1); (Israel) Beitar Jerusalem (2); (Bulgaria) Levski Sofia (4); (Serbia) Radnički Niš (3); (Kazakhstan) Irtysh (5); (Bosnia and Herzegovina) Željezničar (6)	(Liechtenstein) Vaduz (8); (Georgia (country)) Chikhura Sachkhere (7); (Lithuania) Trakai (10); (Estonia) Narva Trans (9); (Armenia) Gandzasar Kapan (11); (Malta) Gżira United (12)	(Denmark) Copenhagen (6); (Republic of Ireland) Dundalk (2); (Sweden) BK Häcken (5); (Scotland) Hibernian (3); (Norway) Sarpsborg 08 (4); (Slovenia) Rudar Velenje (1)	(Estonia) FCI Levadia (7); (Iceland) ÍBV (8); (Latvia) Liepāja (10); (Finland) KuPS (9); (San Marino) Tre Fiori (11); (Faroe Islands) NSÍ (12)

Notes

1. ^{†} Winners of the preliminary round. Teams in italics defeated a team with a higher coefficient, thus effectively taking the coefficient of their opponent in the draw.

=== Summary ===
The first legs were played on 10, 11 and 12 July, and the second legs on 17, 18 and 19 July 2018.

Team 1	Agg.	Team 2	1st leg	2nd leg
Stjarnan (Iceland)	3–1	(Estonia) Nõmme Kalju	3–0	0–1
Ilves (Finland)	1–3	(Bulgaria) Slavia Sofia	0–1	1–2
KÍ (Faroe Islands)	2–3	(Lithuania) Žalgiris	1–2	1–1
Fola Esch (Luxembourg)	0–0 (5–4 p)	(Kosovo) Prishtina	0–0	0–0 (a.e.t.)
Glenavon (Northern Ireland)	3–6	(Norway) Molde	2–1	1–5
DAC Dunajská Streda (Slovakia)	3–2	(Georgia (country)) Dinamo Tbilisi	1–1	2–1
Stumbras (Lithuania)	1–2	(Cyprus) Apollon Limassol	1–0	0–2
Široki Brijeg (Bosnia and Herzegovina)	3–3 (a)	(Slovenia) Domžale	2–2	1–1
Rangers (Scotland)	2–0	(North Macedonia) Shkupi	2–0	0–0
Gabala (Azerbaijan)	1–2 (Note: Order of legs reversed after original draw.)	(Luxembourg) Progrès Niederkorn	0–2	1–0
Racing Union (Luxembourg)	0–2	(Romania) Viitorul Constanța	0–2	0–0
Samtredia (Georgia (country))	0–3	(Kazakhstan) Tobol	0–1	0–2
Partizani (Albania)	0–3	(Slovenia) Maribor	0–1	0–2
Neftçi (Azerbaijan)	3–5	(Hungary) Újpest	3–1	0–4
Budućnost Podgorica (Montenegro)	1–3	(Slovakia) Trenčín	0–2	1–1
Derry City (Republic of Ireland)	2–3	(Belarus) Dinamo Minsk	0–2	2–1
B36 (Faroe Islands)	2–1	(Montenegro) Titograd Podgorica	0–0	2–1
Górnik Zabrze (Poland)	2–1	(Moldova) Zaria Bălți	1–0	1–1
Spartak Subotica (Serbia)	3–1	(Northern Ireland) Coleraine	1–1	2–0
Pyunik (Armenia)	3–0	(North Macedonia) Vardar	1–0	2–0
Shamrock Rovers (Republic of Ireland)	1–2	(Sweden) AIK	0–1	1–1 (a.e.t.)
Connah's Quay Nomads (Wales)	1–5	(Belarus) Shakhtyor Soligorsk	1–3	0–2
Lahti (Finland)	0–3	(Iceland) FH	0–3	0–0
Ventspils (Latvia)	8–3	(Albania) Luftëtari	5–0	3–3
Cliftonville (Northern Ireland)	1–3	(Denmark) Nordsjælland	0–1	1–2
Banants (Armenia)	1–5	(Bosnia and Herzegovina) Sarajevo	1–2	0–3
Engordany (Andorra)	1–10	(Kazakhstan) Kairat	0–3	1–7
Petrocub Hîncești (Moldova)	2–3	(Croatia) Osijek	1–1	1–2
Anorthosis Famagusta (Cyprus)	2–2 (a)	(Albania) Laçi	2–1	0–1
Ferencváros (Hungary)	1–2	(Israel) Maccabi Tel Aviv	1–1	0–1
Balzan (Malta)	5–3	(Azerbaijan) Keşla	4–1	1–2
Rabotnicki (North Macedonia)	2–5	(Hungary) Honvéd	2–1	0–4
Rudar Pljevlja (Montenegro)	0–6	(Serbia) Partizan	0–3	0–3
CSKA Sofia (Bulgaria)	1–1 (5–3 p)	(Latvia) Riga	1–0	0–1 (a.e.t.)
Milsami Orhei (Moldova)	2–9	(Slovakia) Slovan Bratislava	2–4	0–5
Radnički Niš (Serbia)	5–0	(Malta) Gżira United	4–0	1–0
Lech Poznań (Poland)	3–2	(Armenia) Gandzasar Kapan	2–0	1–2
Chikhura Sachkhere (Georgia (country))	2–1	(Israel) Beitar Jerusalem	0–0	2–1
Vaduz (Liechtenstein)	3–3 (a)	(Bulgaria) Levski Sofia	1–0	2–3
Narva Trans (Estonia)	1–5	(Bosnia and Herzegovina) Željezničar	0–2	1–3
Trakai (Lithuania)	1–0	(Kazakhstan) Irtysh	0–0	1–0
Hibernian (Scotland)	12–5	(Faroe Islands) NSÍ	6–1	6–4
Rudar Velenje (Slovenia)	10–0	(San Marino) Tre Fiori	7–0	3–0
FCI Levadia (Estonia)	1–3	(Republic of Ireland) Dundalk	0–1	1–2
ÍBV (Iceland)	0–6	(Norway) Sarpsborg 08	0–4	0–2
KuPS (Finland)	1–2	(Denmark) Copenhagen	0–1	1–1
Liepāja (Latvia)	2–4	(Sweden) BK Häcken	0–3	2–1

== Second qualifying round ==
The draw for the second qualifying round Champions Path was held on 19 June 2018, 16:00 CEST, and the draw for the second qualifying round Main Path was held on 20 June 2018, 14:50 CEST.

=== Seeding ===
A total of 18 teams were involved in the second qualifying round Champions Path draw.

- Seeded: 15 of the 16 losers of the Champions League first qualifying round (excluding the losers of the Champions League first qualifying round given a bye to the third qualifying round as decided by an additional draw held after the Champions League first qualifying round draw)
- Unseeded: the three losers of the Champions League preliminary round

They were divided into three groups of six teams, where five teams were seeded and one team were unseeded. Teams from Serbia and Kosovo, and Bosnia Herzegovina and Kosovo, could not be drawn into the same tie, and if such a potential pairing was drawn, the second team drawn in the current tie would be moved to the next tie.

Champions Path
Bye to third qualifying round (decided by draw)	Group 1		Group 2		Group 3	
Bye to third qualifying round (decided by draw)	Seeded	Unseeded	Seeded	Unseeded	Seeded	Unseeded
(Republic of Ireland) Cork City	(Georgia (country)) Torpedo Kutaisi; (Faroe Islands) Víkingur Gøta; (Wales) The New Saints; (Malta) Valletta; (Bosnia and Herzegovina) Zrinjski Mostar	(Gibraltar) Lincoln Red Imps	(Armenia) Alashkert; (Montenegro) Sutjeska; (Kosovo) Drita; (Iceland) Valur; (Luxembourg) F91 Dudelange	(Andorra) FC Santa Coloma	(Northern Ireland) Crusaders; (Cyprus) APOEL; (Slovenia) Olimpija Ljubljana; (Latvia) Spartaks Jūrmala; (Estonia) Flora	(San Marino) La Fiorita

A total of 74 teams were involved in the second qualifying round Main Path draw: 27 teams entering in this round, and the 47 winners of the first qualifying round. They were divided into seven groups: five of ten teams, where five teams were seeded and five teams were unseeded, and two of twelve teams, where six teams were seeded and six teams were unseeded. Numbers were pre-assigned for each team by UEFA so that the draw could be held in one run for all groups with ten teams and one run for all groups with twelve teams.

Main Path
Group 1		Group 2		Group 3	
Seeded	Unseeded	Seeded	Unseeded	Seeded	Unseeded
(Netherlands) AZ (4); (England) Burnley (2); (Italy) Atalanta (3); (Norway) Molde (5); (Lithuania) Žalgiris (1)	(Albania) Laçi (10); (Scotland) Aberdeen (8); (Liechtenstein) Vaduz (9); (Kazakhstan) Kairat (7); (Bosnia and Herzegovina) Sarajevo (6)	(Romania) FCSB (4); (Serbia) Partizan (5); (Iceland) FH (2); (Denmark) Nordsjælland (1); (Slovakia) Slovan Bratislava (3)	(Israel) Hapoel Haifa (8); (Sweden) AIK (9); (Malta) Balzan (6); (Lithuania) Trakai (10); (Slovenia) Rudar Velenje (7)	(Czech Republic) Sparta Prague (2); (Israel) Maccabi Tel Aviv (1); (Austria) Flyeralarm Admira (4); (Republic of Ireland) Dundalk (5); (Slovakia) Trenčín (3)	(Cyprus) AEK Larnaca (10); (Poland) Górnik Zabrze (6); (Bulgaria) CSKA Sofia (7); (Serbia) Radnički Niš (9); (Serbia) Spartak Subotica (8)
Group 4		Group 5			
Seeded	Unseeded	Seeded	Unseeded		
(Denmark) Copenhagen (3); (Germany) RB Leipzig (5); (Russia) Ufa (1); (Portugal) Rio Ave (2); (Armenia) Pyunik (4)	(Poland) Jagiellonia Białystok (8); (Iceland) Stjarnan (6); (Sweden) BK Häcken (10); (Kazakhstan) Tobol (7); (Slovenia) Domžale (9)	(Turkey) Beşiktaş (4); (Belarus) Dinamo Minsk (2); (Austria) LASK (5); (Luxembourg) Progrès Niederkorn (3); (Croatia) Osijek (1)	(Slovakia) DAC Dunajská Streda (8); (Scotland) Rangers (9); (Norway) Lillestrøm (10); (Hungary) Honvéd (6); (Faroe Islands) B36 (7)		
Group 6		Group 7			
Seeded	Unseeded	Seeded	Unseeded		
(Spain) Sevilla (4); (France) Bordeaux (6); (Cyprus) Apollon Limassol (5); (Switzerland) St. Gallen (2); (Netherlands) Vitesse (3); (Greece) Atromitos (1)	(Romania) Viitorul Constanța (9); (Hungary) Újpest (12); (Latvia) Ventspils (10); (Belarus) Dynamo Brest (7); (Norway) Sarpsborg 08 (8); (Bosnia and Herzegovina) Željezničar (11)	(Belgium) Genk (2); (Slovenia) Maribor (3); (Greece) Asteras Tripolis (5); (Ukraine) Mariupol (1); (Croatia) Hajduk Split (4); (Poland) Lech Poznań (6)	(Georgia (country)) Chikhura Sachkhere (9); (Sweden) Djurgårdens IF (7); (Bulgaria) Slavia Sofia (12); (Belarus) Shakhtyor Soligorsk (10); (Scotland) Hibernian (11); (Luxembourg) Fola Esch (8)		

Notes

1. ^{†} Winners of the first qualifying round. Teams in italics defeated a team with a higher coefficient, thus effectively taking the coefficient of their opponent in the draw.

=== Summary ===
The first legs were played on 26 July, and the second legs on 31 July, 1 and 2 August 2018.

Team 1	Agg.	Team 2	1st leg	2nd leg
Champions Path
Cork City (Republic of Ireland)	Bye	N/A	—	—
The New Saints (Wales)	3–2	(Gibraltar) Lincoln Red Imps	2–1	1–1
Torpedo Kutaisi (Georgia (country))	7–0	(Faroe Islands) Víkingur Gøta	3–0	4–0
Zrinjski Mostar (Bosnia and Herzegovina)	3–2	(Malta) Valletta	1–1	2–1
FC Santa Coloma (Andorra)	1–3	(Iceland) Valur	1–0	0–3
Sutjeska (Montenegro)	0–1	(Armenia) Alashkert	0–1	0–0
F91 Dudelange (Luxembourg)	3–2	(Kosovo) Drita	2–1	1–1
Spartaks Jūrmala (Latvia)	9–0	(San Marino) La Fiorita	6–0	3–0
APOEL (Cyprus)	5–2	(Estonia) Flora	5–0	0–2
Olimpija Ljubljana (Slovenia)	6–2	(Northern Ireland) Crusaders	5–1	1–1
Main Path
Molde (Norway)	5–0	(Albania) Laçi	3–0	2–0
Atalanta (Italy)	10–2 (Note: Order of legs reversed after original draw.)	(Bosnia and Herzegovina) Sarajevo	2–2	8–0
Žalgiris (Lithuania)	2–1	(Liechtenstein) Vaduz	1–0	1–1
Kairat (Kazakhstan)	3–2	(Netherlands) AZ	2–0	1–2
Aberdeen (Scotland)	2–4	(England) Burnley	1–1	1–3 (a.e.t.)
Partizan (Serbia)	2–1	(Lithuania) Trakai	1–0	1–1
Balzan (Malta)	3–4	(Slovakia) Slovan Bratislava	2–1	1–3
Nordsjælland (Denmark)	2–0	(Sweden) AIK	1–0	1–0
Rudar Velenje (Slovenia)	0–6	(Romania) FCSB	0–2	0–4
Hapoel Haifa (Israel)	2–1	(Iceland) FH	1–1	1–0
Dundalk (Republic of Ireland)	0–4	(Cyprus) AEK Larnaca	0–0	0–4
Górnik Zabrze (Poland)	1–5	(Slovakia) Trenčín	0–1	1–4
Maccabi Tel Aviv (Israel)	4–2	(Serbia) Radnički Niš	2–0	2–2
CSKA Sofia (Bulgaria)	6–1	(Austria) Flyeralarm Admira	3–0	3–1
Spartak Subotica (Serbia)	3–2	(Czech Republic) Sparta Prague	2–0	1–2
RB Leipzig (Germany)	5–1	(Sweden) BK Häcken	4–0	1–1
Stjarnan (Iceland)	0–7	(Denmark) Copenhagen	0–2	0–5
Ufa (Russia)	1–1 (a)	(Slovenia) Domžale	0–0	1–1
Tobol (Kazakhstan)	2–2 (a)	(Armenia) Pyunik	2–1	0–1
Jagiellonia Białystok (Poland)	5–4	(Portugal) Rio Ave	1–0	4–4
LASK (Austria)	6–1	(Norway) Lillestrøm	4–0	2–1
Honvéd (Hungary)	1–2	(Luxembourg) Progrès Niederkorn	1–0	0–2
Osijek (Croatia)	1–2	(Scotland) Rangers	0–1	1–1
B36 (Faroe Islands)	0–8	(Turkey) Beşiktaş	0–2	0–6
DAC Dunajská Streda (Slovakia)	2–7	(Belarus) Dinamo Minsk	1–3	1–4
Ventspils (Latvia)	1–3	(France) Bordeaux	0–1	1–2
Željezničar (Bosnia and Herzegovina)	2–5	(Cyprus) Apollon Limassol	1–2	1–3
Viitorul Constanța (Romania)	3–5	(Netherlands) Vitesse	2–2	1–3
St. Gallen (Switzerland)	2–2 (a)	(Norway) Sarpsborg 08	2–1	0–1
Dynamo Brest (Belarus)	5–4	(Greece) Atromitos	4–3	1–1
Sevilla (Spain)	7–1	(Hungary) Újpest	4–0	3–1
Shakhtyor Soligorsk (Belarus)	2–4	(Poland) Lech Poznań	1–1	1–3 (a.e.t.)
Hibernian (Scotland)	4–3	(Greece) Asteras Tripolis	3–2	1–1
Chikhura Sachkhere (Georgia (country))	0–2	(Slovenia) Maribor	0–0	0–2
Genk (Belgium)	9–1	(Luxembourg) Fola Esch	5–0	4–1
Djurgårdens IF (Sweden)	2–3	(Ukraine) Mariupol	1–1	1–2 (a.e.t.)
Hajduk Split (Croatia)	4–2	(Bulgaria) Slavia Sofia	1–0	3–2

== Third qualifying round ==
The draw for the third qualifying round Champions Path was held on 23 July 2018, 12:45 CEST, and the draw for the third qualifying round Main Path was held on 23 July 2018, 14:00 CEST.

=== Seeding ===
A total of 20 teams were involved in the third qualifying round Champions Path draw.

- Seeded: the 10 losers of the Champions League second qualifying round Champions Path
- Unseeded: the loser of the Champions League first qualifying round which received a bye, and the 9 winners of the Europa League second qualifying round Champions Path

They were divided into two groups of ten teams, where five teams were seeded and five teams were unseeded.

Champions Path
Group 1		Group 2	
Seeded	Unseeded	Seeded	Unseeded
(Bulgaria) Ludogorets Razgrad; (Poland) Legia Warsaw; (Finland) HJK; (Moldova) Sheriff Tiraspol; (Romania) CFR Cluj	(Bosnia and Herzegovina) Zrinjski Mostar; (Luxembourg) F91 Dudelange; (Slovenia) Olimpija Ljubljana; (Armenia) Alashkert; (Iceland) Valur	(Norway) Rosenborg; (Denmark) Midtjylland; (Albania) Kukësi; (Israel) Hapoel Be'er Sheva; (Lithuania) Sūduva	(Cyprus) APOEL; (Wales) The New Saints; (Georgia (country)) Torpedo Kutaisi; (Latvia) Spartaks Jūrmala; (Republic of Ireland) Cork City

Notes

1. ^{†} Loser of the Champions League first qualifying round which received a bye.

A total of 52 teams were involved in the third qualifying round Main Path draw: 13 teams entering in this round, the 37 winners of the second qualifying round Main Path, and the two Champions League losers of the second qualifying round League Path. They were divided into five groups: four of ten teams, where five teams were seeded and five teams were unseeded, and one of twelve teams, where six teams were seeded and six teams were unseeded. Numbers were pre-assigned for each team by UEFA so that the draw could be held in one run for all groups with ten teams and one run for all groups with twelve teams.

Main Path
Group 1		Group 2		Group 3	
Seeded	Unseeded	Seeded	Unseeded	Seeded	Unseeded
(Russia) Zenit Saint Petersburg (5); (Austria) Sturm Graz (1); (Israel) Maccabi Tel Aviv (2); (England) Burnley (4); (Croatia) Rijeka (3)	(Turkey) İstanbul Başakşehir (10); (Belarus) Dinamo Minsk (7); (Norway) Sarpsborg 08 (8); (Cyprus) AEK Larnaca (9); (Armenia) Pyunik (6)	(Switzerland) Basel (3); (Portugal) Braga (2); (Belgium) Genk (1); (Serbia) Partizan (4); (Italy) Atalanta (5)	(Ukraine) Zorya Luhansk (6); (Poland) Lech Poznań (9); (Netherlands) Vitesse (8); (Israel) Hapoel Haifa (7); (Denmark) Nordsjælland (10)	(Spain) Sevilla (1); (Romania) FCSB (5); (Kazakhstan) Kairat (3); (Austria) Rapid Wien (4); (Norway) Molde (2)	(Scotland) Hibernian (6); (Croatia) Hajduk Split (7); (Czech Republic) Sigma Olomouc (8); (Lithuania) Žalgiris (9); (Slovakia) Slovan Bratislava (10)
Group 4		Group 5			
Seeded	Unseeded	Seeded	Unseeded		
(Greece) Olympiacos (1); (Denmark) Copenhagen (5); (Slovenia) Maribor (3); (Netherlands) Feyenoord (4); (France) Bordeaux (2)	(Ukraine) Mariupol (6); (Bulgaria) CSKA Sofia (7); (Switzerland) Luzern (9); (Scotland) Rangers (8); (Slovakia) Trenčín (10)	(Turkey) Beşiktaş (1); (Serbia) Spartak Subotica (2); (Belgium) Gent (5); (Germany) RB Leipzig (4); (Russia) Ufa (3); (Cyprus) Apollon Limassol (6)	(Poland) Jagiellonia Białystok (7); (Austria) LASK (8); (Belarus) Dynamo Brest (9); (Denmark) Brøndby (10); (Romania) Universitatea Craiova (11); (Luxembourg) Progrès Niederkorn (12)		

Notes

1. ^{†} Winners of the second qualifying round. Teams in italics defeated a team with a higher coefficient, thus effectively taking the coefficient of their opponent in the draw.
2. ^{CL} Losers of the Champions League second qualifying round. Teams in italics lost to a team with a higher coefficient, thus effectively taking the coefficient of their opponent in the draw.

=== Summary ===
The first legs were played on 7 and 9 August, and the second legs on 16 August 2018.

Team 1	Agg.	Team 2	1st leg	2nd leg
Champions Path
Ludogorets Razgrad (Bulgaria)	2–1	(Bosnia and Herzegovina) Zrinjski Mostar	1–0	1–1
Legia Warsaw (Poland)	3–4	(Luxembourg) F91 Dudelange	1–2	2–2
Alashkert (Armenia)	0–7	(Romania) CFR Cluj	0–2	0–5
Olimpija Ljubljana (Slovenia)	7–1	(Finland) HJK	3–0	4–1
Sheriff Tiraspol (Moldova)	2–2 (a)	(Iceland) Valur	1–0	1–2
Cork City (Republic of Ireland)	0–5	(Norway) Rosenborg	0–2	0–3
Spartaks Jūrmala (Latvia)	0–1	(Lithuania) Sūduva	0–1	0–0
The New Saints (Wales)	1–5	(Denmark) Midtjylland	0–2	1–3
Hapoel Be'er Sheva (Israel)	3–5	(Cyprus) APOEL	2–2	1–3
Torpedo Kutaisi (Georgia (country))	5–4	(Albania) Kukësi	5–2	0–2
Main Path
Pyunik (Armenia)	1–2	(Israel) Maccabi Tel Aviv	0–0	1–2
Dinamo Minsk (Belarus)	5–8	(Russia) Zenit Saint Petersburg	4–0	1–8 (a.e.t.)
Sturm Graz (Austria)	0–7	(Cyprus) AEK Larnaca	0–2	0–5
Sarpsborg 08 (Norway)	2–1	(Croatia) Rijeka	1–1	1–0
İstanbul Başakşehir (Turkey)	0–1	(England) Burnley	0–0	0–1 (a.e.t.)
Zorya Luhansk (Ukraine)	3–3 (a)	(Portugal) Braga	1–1	2–2
Hapoel Haifa (Israel)	1–6	(Italy) Atalanta	1–4	0–2
Genk (Belgium)	4–1	(Poland) Lech Poznań	2–0	2–1
Vitesse (Netherlands)	0–2	(Switzerland) Basel	0–1	0–1
Nordsjælland (Denmark)	3–5	(Serbia) Partizan	1–2	2–3
Hibernian (Scotland)	0–3	(Norway) Molde	0–0	0–3
Hajduk Split (Croatia)	1–2	(Romania) FCSB	0–0	1–2
Sevilla (Spain)	6–0	(Lithuania) Žalgiris	1–0	5–0
Sigma Olomouc (Czech Republic)	4–1	(Kazakhstan) Kairat	2–0	2–1
Slovan Bratislava (Slovakia)	2–5	(Austria) Rapid Wien	2–1	0–4
Mariupol (Ukraine)	2–5	(France) Bordeaux	1–3	1–2
CSKA Sofia (Bulgaria)	2–4	(Denmark) Copenhagen	1–2	1–2
Olympiacos (Greece)	7–1	(Switzerland) Luzern	4–0	3–1
Rangers (Scotland)	3–1	(Slovenia) Maribor	3–1	0–0
Trenčín (Slovakia)	5–1	(Netherlands) Feyenoord	4–0	1–1
Jagiellonia Białystok (Poland)	1–4	(Belgium) Gent	0–1	1–3
Spartak Subotica (Serbia)	1–4	(Denmark) Brøndby	0–2	1–2
Ufa (Russia)	4–3	(Luxembourg) Progrès Niederkorn	2–1	2–2
Beşiktaş (Turkey)	2–2 (a)	(Austria) LASK	1–0	1–2
Apollon Limassol (Cyprus)	4–1	(Belarus) Dynamo Brest	4–0	0–1
RB Leipzig (Germany)	4–2	(Romania) Universitatea Craiova	3–1	1–1

== Play-off round ==
The draw for the play-off round was held on 6 August 2018, 13:30 CEST.

=== Seeding ===
A total of 16 teams were involved in the play-off round Champions Path draw.

- Seeded: the six losers of the Champions League third qualifying round Champions Path
- Unseeded: the 10 winners of the Europa League third qualifying round Champions Path

They were divided into two groups of eight teams, where three teams were seeded and five teams were unseeded.

Champions Path
Group 1		Group 2	
Seeded	Unseeded	Seeded	Unseeded
(North Macedonia) Shkëndija; (Kazakhstan) Astana; (Slovakia) Spartak Trnava	(Cyprus) APOEL; (Luxembourg) F91 Dudelange; (Norway) Rosenborg; (Slovenia) Olimpija Ljubljana; (Romania) CFR Cluj	(Scotland) Celtic; (Azerbaijan) Qarabağ; (Sweden) Malmö FF	(Bulgaria) Ludogorets Razgrad; (Moldova) Sheriff Tiraspol; (Denmark) Midtjylland; (Georgia (country)) Torpedo Kutaisi; (Lithuania) Sūduva

A total of 26 teams, all winners of the third qualifying round Main Path, were involved in the play-off round Main Path draw. They were divided into three groups: two of eight teams, where four teams were seeded and four teams were unseeded, and one of ten teams, where five teams were seeded and five teams were unseeded. Numbers were pre-assigned for each team by UEFA so that the draw could be held in one run for all groups with eight teams and one run for all groups with ten teams.

Main Path
Group 1		Group 2		Group 3	
Seeded	Unseeded	Seeded	Unseeded	Seeded	Unseeded
(Spain) Sevilla (4); (Turkey) Beşiktaş (2); (Belgium) Gent (3); (Israel) Maccabi Tel Aviv (1)	(Serbia) Partizan (6); (Norway) Sarpsborg 08 (5); (France) Bordeaux (7); (Czech Republic) Sigma Olomouc (8)	(Switzerland) Basel (1); (Denmark) Copenhagen (2); (Romania) FCSB (4); (Scotland) Rangers (3)	(Austria) Rapid Wien (8); (Italy) Atalanta (6); (Russia) Ufa (7); (Cyprus) Apollon Limassol (5)	(Russia) Zenit Saint Petersburg (1); (Greece) Olympiacos (2); (Ukraine) Zorya Luhansk (4); (Belgium) Genk (3); (Slovakia) Trenčín (5)	(Germany) RB Leipzig (6); (England) Burnley (10); (Norway) Molde (8); (Cyprus) AEK Larnaca (9); (Denmark) Brøndby (7)

Notes

1. ^{†} Winners of the third qualifying round. Teams in italics defeated a team with a higher coefficient, thus effectively taking the coefficient of their opponent in the draw.

=== Summary ===
The first legs were played on 23 August, and the second legs on 30 August 2018.

Team 1	Agg.	Team 2	1st leg	2nd leg
Champions Path
Olimpija Ljubljana (Slovenia)	1–3	(Slovakia) Spartak Trnava	0–2	1–1
APOEL (Cyprus)	1–1 (1–2 p)	(Kazakhstan) Astana	1–0	0–1 (a.e.t.)
Rosenborg (Norway)	5–1	(North Macedonia) Shkëndija	3–1	2–0
F91 Dudelange (Luxembourg)	5–2	(Romania) CFR Cluj	2–0	3–2
Sūduva (Lithuania)	1–4	(Scotland) Celtic	1–1	0–3
Sheriff Tiraspol (Moldova)	1–3	(Azerbaijan) Qarabağ	1–0	0–3
Malmö FF (Sweden)	4–2	(Denmark) Midtjylland	2–2	2–0
Torpedo Kutaisi (Georgia (country))	0–5	(Bulgaria) Ludogorets Razgrad	0–1	0–4
Main Path
Sigma Olomouc (Czech Republic)	0–4	(Spain) Sevilla	0–1	0–3
Sarpsborg 08 (Norway)	4–3	(Israel) Maccabi Tel Aviv	3–1	1–2
Gent (Belgium)	0–2	(France) Bordeaux	0–0	0–2
Partizan (Serbia)	1–4	(Turkey) Beşiktaş	1–1	0–3
Rapid Wien (Austria)	4–3	(Romania) FCSB	3–1	1–2
Basel (Switzerland)	3–3 (a) (Note: Order of legs reversed after original draw.)	(Cyprus) Apollon Limassol	3–2	0–1
Rangers (Scotland)	2–1	(Russia) Ufa	1–0	1–1
Atalanta (Italy)	0–0 (3–4 p)	(Denmark) Copenhagen	0–0	0–0 (a.e.t.)
Zenit Saint Petersburg (Russia)	4–3	(Norway) Molde	3–1	1–2
Trenčín (Slovakia)	1–4	(Cyprus) AEK Larnaca	1–1	0–3
Genk (Belgium)	9–4	(Denmark) Brøndby	5–2	4–2
Olympiacos (Greece)	4–2	(England) Burnley	3–1	1–1
Zorya Luhansk (Ukraine)	2–3	(Germany) RB Leipzig	0–0	2–3

== Top goalscorers ==
There were 848 goals scored in 314 matches in the qualifying phase and play-off round, for an average of 2.7 goals per match.

Rank	Player	Team	Goals
1	(Nigeria) Adeleke Akinyemi	(Latvia) Ventspils	7
1	(Norway) Eirik Hestad	(Norway) Molde	7
3	(Hungary) Márton Eppel	(Kazakhstan) Kairat	6
3	(Croatia) Antonio Mance	(Slovakia) Trenčín	6
3	(Tanzania) Mbwana Samatta	(Belgium) Genk	6
3	(Spain) Pablo Sarabia	(Spain) Sevilla	6
3	(North Macedonia) Ivan Tričkovski	(Cyprus) AEK Larnaca	6
8	(Israel) Eliran Atar	(Israel) Maccabi Tel Aviv	5
8	(Denmark) Christian Gytkjær	(Poland) Lech Poznań	5
8	(Bosnia and Herzegovina) Kenan Kodro	(Denmark) Copenhagen	5
8	(Serbia) Uroš Nikolić	(Belarus) Dinamo Minsk	5
8	(Slovenia) Andraž Šporar	(Slovakia) Slovan Bratislava	5
8	(Belgium) Leandro Trossard	(Belgium) Genk	5
13	15 players		4
