= 2018–19 UEFA Europa League qualifying (third and play-off round matches) =

European football competition

This page summarises the matches of the third qualifying and play-off rounds of 2018–19 UEFA Europa League qualifying.

Times are CEST (UTC+2), as listed by UEFA (local times, if different, are in parentheses).

== Third qualifying round ==
=== Summary ===
The first legs were played on 7 and 9 August, and the second legs on 16 August 2018.

Team 1	Agg.	Team 2	1st leg	2nd leg
Champions Path
Ludogorets Razgrad (Bulgaria)	2–1	(Bosnia and Herzegovina) Zrinjski Mostar	1–0	1–1
Legia Warsaw (Poland)	3–4	(Luxembourg) F91 Dudelange	1–2	2–2
Alashkert (Armenia)	0–7	(Romania) CFR Cluj	0–2	0–5
Olimpija Ljubljana (Slovenia)	7–1	(Finland) HJK	3–0	4–1
Sheriff Tiraspol (Moldova)	2–2 (a)	(Iceland) Valur	1–0	1–2
Cork City (Republic of Ireland)	0–5	(Norway) Rosenborg	0–2	0–3
Spartaks Jūrmala (Latvia)	0–1	(Lithuania) Sūduva	0–1	0–0
The New Saints (Wales)	1–5	(Denmark) Midtjylland	0–2	1–3
Hapoel Be'er Sheva (Israel)	3–5	(Cyprus) APOEL	2–2	1–3
Torpedo Kutaisi (Georgia (country))	5–4	(Albania) Kukësi	5–2	0–2
Main Path
Pyunik (Armenia)	1–2	(Israel) Maccabi Tel Aviv	0–0	1–2
Dinamo Minsk (Belarus)	5–8	(Russia) Zenit Saint Petersburg	4–0	1–8 (a.e.t.)
Sturm Graz (Austria)	0–7	(Cyprus) AEK Larnaca	0–2	0–5
Sarpsborg 08 (Norway)	2–1	(Croatia) Rijeka	1–1	1–0
İstanbul Başakşehir (Turkey)	0–1	(England) Burnley	0–0	0–1 (a.e.t.)
Zorya Luhansk (Ukraine)	3–3 (a)	(Portugal) Braga	1–1	2–2
Hapoel Haifa (Israel)	1–6	(Italy) Atalanta	1–4	0–2
Genk (Belgium)	4–1	(Poland) Lech Poznań	2–0	2–1
Vitesse (Netherlands)	0–2	(Switzerland) Basel	0–1	0–1
Nordsjælland (Denmark)	3–5	(Serbia) Partizan	1–2	2–3
Hibernian (Scotland)	0–3	(Norway) Molde	0–0	0–3
Hajduk Split (Croatia)	1–2	(Romania) FCSB	0–0	1–2
Sevilla (Spain)	6–0	(Lithuania) Žalgiris	1–0	5–0
Sigma Olomouc (Czech Republic)	4–1	(Kazakhstan) Kairat	2–0	2–1
Slovan Bratislava (Slovakia)	2–5	(Austria) Rapid Wien	2–1	0–4
Mariupol (Ukraine)	2–5	(France) Bordeaux	1–3	1–2
CSKA Sofia (Bulgaria)	2–4	(Denmark) Copenhagen	1–2	1–2
Olympiacos (Greece)	7–1	(Switzerland) Luzern	4–0	3–1
Rangers (Scotland)	3–1	(Slovenia) Maribor	3–1	0–0
Trenčín (Slovakia)	5–1	(Netherlands) Feyenoord	4–0	1–1
Jagiellonia Białystok (Poland)	1–4	(Belgium) Gent	0–1	1–3
Spartak Subotica (Serbia)	1–4	(Denmark) Brøndby	0–2	1–2
Ufa (Russia)	4–3	(Luxembourg) Progrès Niederkorn	2–1	2–2
Beşiktaş (Turkey)	2–2 (a)	(Austria) LASK	1–0	1–2
Apollon Limassol (Cyprus)	4–1	(Belarus) Dynamo Brest	4–0	0–1
RB Leipzig (Germany)	4–2	(Romania) Universitatea Craiova	3–1	1–1

=== Champions Path matches ===
9 August 2018
19:00 (20:00 UTC+3)

Ludogorets Razgrad (Bulgaria)	1–0	(Bosnia and Herzegovina) Zrinjski Mostar
Moți 16'	Report

Ludogorets Arena, Razgrad
Attendance: 3,574
Referee: Vitali Meshkov (Russia)
16 August 2018
20:00

Zrinjski Mostar (Bosnia and Herzegovina)	1–1	(Bulgaria) Ludogorets Razgrad
Bilbija 90+2'	Report	Keșerü 24'

Stadion Pecara, Široki Brijeg
Attendance: 3,500
Referee: Bas Nijhuis (Netherlands)

Ludogorets Razgrad won 2–1 on aggregate.

9 August 2018
21:00

Legia Warsaw (Poland)	1–2	(Luxembourg) F91 Dudelange
Carlitos 27'	Report	Couturier 24'; Turpel 62' (pen.)

Polish Army Stadium, Warsaw
Attendance: 9,923
Referee: Halis Özkahya (Turkey)
16 August 2018
20:00

F91 Dudelange (Luxembourg)	2–2	(Poland) Legia Warsaw
Stumpf 7'; Stélvio 17'	Report	Kanté 33', 86'

Stade Josy Barthel, Luxembourg City (Note: F91 Dudelange played their third qualifying and play-off rounds home matches at Stade Josy Barthel, Luxembourg City, instead of their regular stadium Stade Jos Nosbaum, Dudelange.)
Attendance: 2,000
Referee: Ivaylo Stoyanov (Bulgaria)

F91 Dudelange won 4–3 on aggregate.

9 August 2018
18:00 (20:00 UTC+4)

Alashkert (Armenia)	0–2	(Romania) CFR Cluj
	Report	Țucudean 5', 49' (pen.)

Vazgen Sargsyan Republican Stadium, Yerevan (Note: Alashkert played their home matches at Vazgen Sargsyan Republican Stadium, Yerevan, instead of their regular stadium Alashkert Stadium, Yerevan.)
Attendance: 9,000
Referee: Serhiy Boyko (Ukraine)
16 August 2018
19:00 (20:00 UTC+3)

CFR Cluj (Romania)	5–0	(Armenia) Alashkert
Culio 19' (pen.); Omrani 45+1', 62'; Hoban 58'; Mailat 90+2'	Report

Stadionul Dr. Constantin Rădulescu, Cluj-Napoca
Attendance: 5,500
Referee: Vilhjálmur Thórarinsson (Iceland)

CFR Cluj won 7–0 on aggregate.

9 August 2018
20:00

Olimpija Ljubljana (Slovenia)	3–0	(Finland) HJK
Issah 38', 59'; Kronaveter 50' (pen.)	Report

Stožice Stadium, Ljubljana
Attendance: 4,900
Referee: Benoît Millot (France)
16 August 2018
18:00 (19:00 UTC+3)

HJK (Finland)	1–4	(Slovenia) Olimpija Ljubljana
Chrisantus 85'	Report	Issah 20'; Avramovski 72'; Rafinha 75' (o.g.); Brkić 90+2' (pen.)

Telia 5G -areena, Helsinki
Attendance: 4,127
Referee: Ievgenii Aranovskyi (Ukraine)

Olimpija Ljubljana won 7–1 on aggregate.

9 August 2018
19:00 (20:00 UTC+3)

Sheriff Tiraspol (Moldova)	1–0	(Iceland) Valur
Badibanga 85'	Report

Sheriff Stadium, Tiraspol
Attendance: 4,803
Referee: Arnold Hunter (Northern Ireland)
16 August 2018
21:00 (19:00 UTC+0)

Valur (Iceland)	2–1	(Moldova) Sheriff Tiraspol
Sigurðsson 40'; Halldórsson 90+1'	Report	Badibanga 68'

Hlíðarendi, Reykjavík
Attendance: 1,224
Referee: Marco Fritz (Germany)

2–2 on aggregate; Sheriff Tiraspol won on away goals.

9 August 2018
20:45 (19:45 UTC+1)

Cork City (Republic of Ireland)	0–2	(Norway) Rosenborg
	Report	Levi 22', 44'

Turners Cross, Cork
Attendance: 5,488
Referee: Petr Ardeleánu (Czech Republic)
16 August 2018
20:45

Rosenborg (Norway)	3–0	(Republic of Ireland) Cork City
Šerbečić 26'; Søderlund 34'; Trondsen 58'	Report

Lerkendal Stadion, Trondheim
Attendance: 8,028
Referee: Mads-Kristoffer Kristoffersen (Denmark)

Rosenborg won 5–0 on aggregate.

9 August 2018
18:00 (19:00 UTC+3)

Spartaks Jūrmala (Latvia)	0–1	(Lithuania) Sūduva
	Report	Finkler 52'

Skonto Stadium, Riga (Note: Spartaks Jūrmala played their third qualifying round home match at Skonto Stadium, Riga, instead of their regular stadium Slokas Stadium, Jūrmala.)
Attendance: 1,435
Referee: Thorvaldur Árnason (Iceland)
16 August 2018
19:00 (20:00 UTC+3)

Sūduva (Lithuania)	0–0	(Latvia) Spartaks Jūrmala
	Report

Sūduva Stadium, Marijampolė
Attendance: 2,417
Referee: Ole Hobber Nilsen (Norway)

Sūduva won 1–0 on aggregate.

9 August 2018
20:45 (19:45 UTC+1)

The New Saints (Wales)	0–2	(Denmark) Midtjylland
	Report	Onuachu 9', 27'

Cardiff City Stadium, Cardiff (Note: The New Saints played their third qualifying round home match at the Cardiff City Stadium, Cardiff, instead of their regular stadium Park Hall, Oswestry.)
Attendance: 863
Referee: Peter Kralovič (Slovakia)
16 August 2018
19:00

Midtjylland (Denmark)	3–1	(Wales) The New Saints
George 16'; Okosun 62', 80'	Report	Ebbe 22'

MCH Arena, Herning
Attendance: 4,368
Referee: Irfan Peljto (Bosnia and Herzegovina)

Midtjylland won 5–1 on aggregate.

9 August 2018
19:00 (20:00 UTC+3)

Hapoel Be'er Sheva (Israel)	2–2	(Cyprus) APOEL
Ogu 42'; Nwakaeme 70'	Report	Morais 13' (pen.); Dellatorre 28'

Turner Stadium, Be'er Sheva
Attendance: 9,311
Referee: Aleksei Eskov (Russia)
16 August 2018
19:00 (20:00 UTC+3)

APOEL (Cyprus)	3–1	(Israel) Hapoel Be'er Sheva
Nwakaeme 64' (o.g.); Souza 79', 90+3'	Report	Ben Basat 19'

GSP Stadium, Nicosia
Attendance: 10,891
Referee: Mattias Gestranius (Finland)

APOEL won 5–3 on aggregate.

9 August 2018
19:00 (21:00 UTC+4)

Torpedo Kutaisi (Georgia (country))	5–2	(Albania) Kukësi
Kukhianidze 3', 15'; Marin 28'; Kimadze 31'; Kapanadze 86'	Report	Harba 22'; Plaku 88' (pen.)

Mikheil Meskhi Stadium, Tbilisi (Note: Torpedo Kutaisi played their third qualifying and play-off rounds home matches at Mikheil Meskhi Stadium, Tbilisi, instead of their regular stadium Ramaz Shengelia Stadium, Kutaisi.)
Attendance: 4,521
Referee: Alan Mario Sant (Malta)
16 August 2018
19:00

Kukësi (Albania)	2–0	(Georgia (country)) Torpedo Kutaisi
Reginaldo 29' (pen.), 76' (pen.)	Report

Elbasan Arena, Elbasan (Note: Kukësi played their home match at Elbasan Arena, Elbasan, instead of their regular stadium Zeqir Ymeri Stadium, Kukës.)
Attendance: 200
Referee: Alain Bieri (Switzerland)

Torpedo Kutaisi won 5–4 on aggregate.

=== Main Path matches ===
7 August 2018
18:00 (20:00 UTC+4)

Pyunik (Armenia)	0–0	(Israel) Maccabi Tel Aviv
	Report

Vazgen Sargsyan Republican Stadium, Yerevan
Attendance: 12,500
Referee: Pol van Boekel (Netherlands)
16 August 2018
19:30 (20:30 UTC+3)

Maccabi Tel Aviv (Israel)	2–1	(Armenia) Pyunik
Micha 55'; Atar 68'	Report	Voynov 11'

Netanya Stadium, Netanya (Note: Maccabi Tel Aviv played their home matches at Netanya Stadium, Netanya, instead of their regular stadium Bloomfield Stadium, Tel Aviv, due to renovation.)
Attendance: 8,932
Referee: Ville Nevalainen (Finland)

Maccabi Tel Aviv won 2–1 on aggregate.

9 August 2018
19:00 (20:00 UTC+3)

Dinamo Minsk (Belarus)	4–0	(Russia) Zenit Saint Petersburg
Nikolić 12', 67'; Khvashchynski 32'; Galović 41'	Report

Dinamo Stadium, Minsk
Attendance: 21,750
Referee: Anastasios Papapetrou (Greece)
16 August 2018
19:00 (20:00 UTC+3)

Zenit Saint Petersburg (Russia)	8–1 (a.e.t.)	(Belarus) Dinamo Minsk
Paredes 22'; Noboa 66'; Dzyuba 75', 78', 115' (pen.); Driussi 109'; Mak 120+2' (pen.), 120+3'	Report	Yahaya 99'

Petrovsky Stadium, Saint Petersburg (Note: Zenit Saint Petersburg played their third qualifying round home match at smaller Petrovsky Stadium, Saint Petersburg, instead of their regular stadium Krestovsky Stadium, Saint Petersburg, because they had to play behind closed doors.)
Attendance: 220
Referee: Sébastien Delferière (Belgium)

Zenit Saint Petersburg won 8–5 on aggregate.

9 August 2018
19:00

Sturm Graz (Austria)	0–2	(Cyprus) AEK Larnaca
	Report	Truyols 46'; Tričkovski 74'

Merkur Arena, Graz
Attendance: 7,612
Referee: Mohammed Al-Hakim (Sweden)
16 August 2018
17:30 (18:30 UTC+3)

AEK Larnaca (Cyprus)	5–0	(Austria) Sturm Graz
Tričkovski 8', 67', 80'; Larena 65' (pen.); Florian 86'	Report

AEK Arena – Georgios Karapatakis, Larnaca
Attendance: 4,145
Referee: Paolo Valeri (Italy)

AEK Larnaca won 7–0 on aggregate.

9 August 2018
20:45

Sarpsborg 08 (Norway)	1–1	(Croatia) Rijeka
Zachariassen 72'	Report	Gorgon 83'

Sarpsborg Stadion, Sarpsborg
Attendance: 5,944
Referee: Kevin Clancy (Scotland)
16 August 2018
20:45

Rijeka (Croatia)	0–1	(Norway) Sarpsborg 08
	Report	Mortensen 83'

Stadion Rujevica, Rijeka
Attendance: 5,351
Referee: Donatas Rumšas (Lithuania)

Sarpsborg 08 won 2–1 on aggregate.

9 August 2018
20:00 (21:00 UTC+3)

İstanbul Başakşehir (Turkey)	0–0	(England) Burnley
	Report

Başakşehir Fatih Terim Stadium, Istanbul
Attendance: 4,503
Referee: Srđan Jovanović (Serbia)
16 August 2018
20:45 (19:45 UTC+1)

Burnley (England)	1–0 (a.e.t.)	(Turkey) İstanbul Başakşehir
Cork 97'	Report

Turf Moor, Burnley
Attendance: 16,583
Referee: István Kovács (Romania)

Burnley won 1–0 on aggregate.

9 August 2018
20:30 (21:30 UTC+3)

Zorya Luhansk (Ukraine)	1–1	(Portugal) Braga
Karavayev 72'	Report	Horta 69'

Slavutych-Arena, Zaporizhia (Note: Zorya Luhansk played their home matches at Slavutych-Arena, Zaporizhia, instead of their regular stadium Avanhard Stadium, Luhansk, due to the war conditions in Eastern Ukraine.)
Attendance: 5,365
Referee: Tobias Welz (Germany)
16 August 2018
21:30 (20:30 UTC+1)

Braga (Portugal)	2–2	(Ukraine) Zorya Luhansk
João Novais 65'; Horta 73'	Report	Ratão 70'; Karavayev 83'

Estádio Municipal, Braga
Attendance: 12,224
Referee: Aleksandar Stavrev (Macedonia)

3–3 on aggregate; Zorya Luhansk won on away goals.

9 August 2018
18:00 (19:00 UTC+3)

Hapoel Haifa (Israel)	1–4	(Italy) Atalanta
Buzaglo 7'	Report	Hateboer 18'; Zapata 20'; Pašalić 65'; Barrow 86'

Sammy Ofer Stadium, Haifa
Attendance: 6,412
Referee: Harald Lechner (Austria)
16 August 2018
20:00

Atalanta (Italy)	2–0	(Israel) Hapoel Haifa
Zapata 71'; Cornelius 90+2'	Report

Mapei Stadium – Città del Tricolore, Reggio Emilia (Note: Atalanta played their home matches at Mapei Stadium – Città del Tricolore, Reggio Emilia, instead of their regular stadium Stadio Atleti Azzurri d'Italia, Bergamo, which wasn't given a UEFA licence to hold games.)
Attendance: 6,546
Referee: Frank Schneider (France)

Atalanta won 6–1 on aggregate.

9 August 2018
20:00

Genk (Belgium)	2–0	(Poland) Lech Poznań
Malinovskyi 44'; Samatta 56'	Report

Luminus Arena, Genk
Attendance: 13,540
Referee: Marius Avram (Romania)
16 August 2018
20:15

Lech Poznań (Poland)	1–2	(Belgium) Genk
Cywka 50'	Report	Samatta 19'; Trossard 45+1' (pen.)

Stadion Miejski, Poznań
Attendance: 20,765
Referee: Marco Guida (Italy)

Genk won 4–1 on aggregate.

9 August 2018
20:00

Vitesse (Netherlands)	0–1	(Switzerland) Basel
	Report	Van Wolfswinkel 90+3'

GelreDome, Arnhem
Attendance: 11,532
Referee: Georgi Kabakov (Bulgaria)
16 August 2018
20:00

Basel (Switzerland)	1–0	(Netherlands) Vitesse
Ajeti 30'	Report

St. Jakob-Park, Basel
Attendance: 12,334
Referee: Daniel Siebert (Germany)

Basel won 2–0 on aggregate.

9 August 2018
19:45

Nordsjælland (Denmark)	1–2	(Serbia) Partizan
Rasmussen 71'	Report	Ricardo 10'; Zakarić 64'

Farum Park, Farum
Attendance: 6,079
Referee: Alejandro Hernández Hernández (Spain)
16 August 2018
20:30

Partizan (Serbia)	3–2	(Denmark) Nordsjælland
N. R. Miletić 11'; Janković 30'; Marković 35'	Report	Olsen 9'; Amon 76'

Partizan Stadium, Belgrade
Attendance: 9,372
Referee: Kristo Tohver (Estonia)

Partizan won 5–3 on aggregate.

9 August 2018
20:45 (19:45 UTC+1)

Hibernian (Scotland)	0–0	(Norway) Molde
	Report

Easter Road, Edinburgh
Attendance: 16,339
Referee: Ádám Farkas (Hungary)
16 August 2018
19:00

Molde (Norway)	3–0	(Scotland) Hibernian
Haaland 35', 82'; Aursnes 66'	Report

Aker Stadion, Molde
Attendance: 5,554
Referee: Dennis Higler (Netherlands)

Molde won 3–0 on aggregate.

9 August 2018
20:45

Hajduk Split (Croatia)	0–0	(Romania) FCSB
	Report

Stadion Poljud, Split
Attendance: 25,764
Referee: Tiago Martins (Portugal)
16 August 2018
20:30 (21:30 UTC+3)

FCSB (Romania)	2–1	(Croatia) Hajduk Split
Gnohéré 55' (pen.), 90+3'	Report	Said 82'

Arena Națională, Bucharest
Attendance: 27,410
Referee: Juan Martínez Munuera (Spain)

FCSB won 2–1 on aggregate.

9 August 2018
21:45

Sevilla (Spain)	1–0	(Lithuania) Žalgiris
Banega 34'	Report

Ramón Sánchez Pizjuán, Seville
Attendance: 26,189
Referee: Bojan Pandžić (Sweden)
16 August 2018
19:00 (20:00 UTC+3)

Žalgiris (Lithuania)	0–5	(Spain) Sevilla
	Report	Nolito 6', 83'; Sarabia 7', 44'; Arana 80'

LFF Stadium, Vilnius
Attendance: 5,000
Referee: Enea Jorgji (Albania)

Sevilla won 6–0 on aggregate.

9 August 2018
19:00

Sigma Olomouc (Czech Republic)	2–0	(Kazakhstan) Kairat
Sladký 21'; Pilař 50'	Report

Andrův stadion, Olomouc
Attendance: 6,118
Referee: Massimiliano Irrati (Italy)
16 August 2018
16:00 (20:00 UTC+6)

Kairat (Kazakhstan)	1–2	(Czech Republic) Sigma Olomouc
Eppel 61'	Report	Nešpor 19'; Houska 51'

Almaty Central Stadium, Almaty
Attendance: 20,000
Referee: Sandro Schärer (Switzerland)

Sigma Olomouc won 4–1 on aggregate.

9 August 2018
21:05

Slovan Bratislava (Slovakia)	2–1	(Austria) Rapid Wien
Bozhikov 29'; Barać 49' (o.g.)	Report	Schwab 12'

Štadión Pasienky, Bratislava
Attendance: 9,563
Referee: Paweł Raczkowski (Poland)
16 August 2018
20:30

Rapid Wien (Austria)	4–0	(Slovakia) Slovan Bratislava
Knasmüllner 3', 79', 90+4'; Murg 84'	Report

Allianz Stadion, Vienna
Attendance: 17,800
Referee: Davide Massa (Italy)

Rapid Wien won 5–2 on aggregate.

9 August 2018
19:00 (20:00 UTC+3)

Mariupol (Ukraine)	1–3	(France) Bordeaux
Myshnyov 7'	Report	Laborde 33', 37'; Tchouaméni 49'

Chornomorets Stadium, Odesa (Note: Mariupol played their home matches at Chornomorets Stadium, Odesa, instead of their regular stadium Volodymyr Boiko Stadium, Mariupol, due to the war conditions in Eastern Ukraine.)
Attendance: 6,587
Referee: Ivan Bebek (Croatia)
16 August 2018
20:45

Bordeaux (France)	2–1	(Ukraine) Mariupol
Poundjé 54'; Sankharé 56'	Report	Fomin 66'

Nouveau Stade de Bordeaux, Bordeaux
Attendance: 11,375
Referee: Andrew Dallas (Scotland)

Bordeaux won 5–2 on aggregate.

9 August 2018
19:45 (20:45 UTC+3)

CSKA Sofia (Bulgaria)	1–2	(Denmark) Copenhagen
Maurides 15'	Report	Vavro 64'; Kodro 74' (pen.)

Vasil Levski National Stadium, Sofia (Note: CSKA Sofia played their third qualifying round home match at Vasil Levski National Stadium, Sofia, instead of their regular stadium Balgarska Armia Stadium, Sofia.)
Attendance: 18,100
Referee: Bart Vertenten (Belgium)
16 August 2018
18:30

Copenhagen (Denmark)	2–1	(Bulgaria) CSKA Sofia
N'Doye 23', 64'	Report	Evandro 58'

Parken Stadium, Copenhagen
Attendance: 10,078
Referee: Halil Umut Meler (Turkey)

Copenhagen won 4–2 on aggregate.

9 August 2018
20:00 (21:00 UTC+3)

Olympiacos (Greece)	4–0	(Switzerland) Luzern
Christodoulopoulos 10', 33'; Guerrero 36', 84'	Report

Karaiskakis Stadium, Piraeus
Attendance: 19,208
Referee: François Letexier (France)
16 August 2018
19:30

Luzern (Switzerland)	1–3	(Greece) Olympiacos
Demhasaj 82'	Report	Christodoulopoulos 23', 59'; Guerrero 68'

Swissporarena, Lucerne
Attendance: 6,258
Referee: Kirill Levnikov (Russia)

Olympiacos won 7–1 on aggregate.

9 August 2018
20:45 (19:45 UTC+1)

Rangers (Scotland)	3–1	(Slovenia) Maribor
Morelos 6'; Tavernier 50' (pen.); Coulibaly 86'	Report	Viler 40'

Ibrox Stadium, Glasgow
Attendance: 48,001
Referee: Roi Reinshreiber (Israel)
16 August 2018
20:15

Maribor (Slovenia)	0–0	(Scotland) Rangers
	Report

Ljudski vrt, Maribor
Attendance: 11,166
Referee: Jonathan Lardot (Belgium)

Rangers won 3–1 on aggregate.

9 August 2018
19:00

Trenčín (Slovakia)	4–0	(Netherlands) Feyenoord
Mance 6', 37', 63'; Azango 44'	Report

Štadión pod Dubňom, Žilina (Note: Trenčín played their first and second qualifying rounds home matches at Stadium Myjava, Myjava and third qualifying and play-off rounds home matches at Štadión pod Dubňom, Žilina, instead of their regular stadium Štadión na Sihoti, Trenčín, due to renovation.)
Attendance: 6,817
Referee: Robert Schörgenhofer (Austria)
16 August 2018
20:30

Feyenoord (Netherlands)	1–1	(Slovakia) Trenčín
Botteghin 8'	Report	Mance 9'

De Kuip, Rotterdam
Attendance: 31,500
Referee: Jakob Kehlet (Denmark)

Trenčín won 5–1 on aggregate.

9 August 2018
19:20

Jagiellonia Białystok (Poland)	0–1	(Belgium) Gent
	Report	Jonathan David 85'

Białystok City Stadium, Białystok
Attendance: 15,591
Referee: Ali Palabıyık (Turkey)
16 August 2018
20:30

Gent (Belgium)	3–1	(Poland) Jagiellonia Białystok
Awoniyi 13'; Yaremchuk 84'; Jonathan David 89'	Report	Pospíšil 58'

Ghelamco Arena, Ghent
Attendance: 16,000
Referee: Bastian Dankert (Germany)

Gent won 4–1 on aggregate.

9 August 2018
20:45

Spartak Subotica (Serbia)	0–2	(Denmark) Brøndby
	Report	Kaiser 29'; Mukhtar 47'

Red Star Stadium, Belgrade (Note: Spartak Subotica played their first and second qualifying rounds home matches at Karađorđe Stadium, Novi Sad and third qualifying round home match at Red Star Stadium, Belgrade, instead of their regular stadium Subotica City Stadium, Subotica.)
Attendance: 4,000
Referee: Kevin Blom (Netherlands)
16 August 2018
20:00

Brøndby (Denmark)	2–1	(Serbia) Spartak Subotica
Kaiser 69'; Wilczek 90+3'	Report	Đenić 80'

Brøndby Stadium, Brøndbyvester
Attendance: 10,142
Referee: Hüseyin Göçek (Turkey)

Brøndby won 4–1 on aggregate.

9 August 2018
16:00 (19:00 UTC+5)

Ufa (Russia)	2–1	(Luxembourg) Progrès Niederkorn
Igboun 38'; Oblyakov 63'	Report	O. Thill 80'

Neftyanik Stadium, Ufa
Attendance: 6,794
Referee: Stephan Klossner (Switzerland)
16 August 2018
17:00

Progrès Niederkorn (Luxembourg)	2–2	(Russia) Ufa
Alikin 2' (o.g.); De Almeida 72'	Report	Paurević 51', 90+3'

Stade Municipal, Differdange (Note: Progrès Niederkorn played their home matches at Stade Municipal, Differdange, instead of their regular stadium Stade Jos Haupert, Niederkorn.)
Attendance: 1,736
Referee: Manuel Schüttengruber (Austria)

Ufa won 4–3 on aggregate.

9 August 2018
20:00 (21:00 UTC+3)

Beşiktaş (Turkey)	1–0	(Austria) LASK
Babel 6'	Report

Vodafone Park, Istanbul
Attendance: 24,476
Referee: Bartosz Frankowski (Poland)
16 August 2018
19:45

LASK (Austria)	2–1	(Turkey) Beşiktaş
João Victor 42'; Frieser 69'	Report	Negredo 90'

Linzer Stadion, Linz
Attendance: 13,739
Referee: Nikola Dabanović (Montenegro)

2–2 on aggregate; Beşiktaş won on away goals.

9 August 2018
19:00 (20:00 UTC+3)

Apollon Limassol (Cyprus)	4–0	(Belarus) Dynamo Brest
Zelaya 46', 58'; Marković 87'; Veratsila 90+2' (o.g.)	Report

GSP Stadium, Nicosia (Note: Apollon Limassol played their home matches at GSP Stadium, Nicosia, instead of their regular stadium Tsirio Stadium, Limassol.)
Attendance: 3,590
Referee: Carlos Xistra (Portugal)
16 August 2018
19:45 (20:45 UTC+3)

Dynamo Brest (Belarus)	1–0	(Cyprus) Apollon Limassol
Nyakhaychyk 86'	Report

Regional Sport Complex Brestsky, Brest
Attendance: 8,800
Referee: Martin Strömbergsson (Sweden)

Apollon Limassol won 4–1 on aggregate.

9 August 2018
18:30

RB Leipzig (Germany)	3–1	(Romania) Universitatea Craiova
Konaté 25'; Cunha 77'; Poulsen 87'	Report	Martić 90+3'

Red Bull Arena, Leipzig
Attendance: 16,648
Referee: Paweł Gil (Poland)
16 August 2018
18:30 (19:30 UTC+3)

Universitatea Craiova (Romania)	1–1	(Germany) RB Leipzig
Baicu 85'	Report	Sabitzer 39'

Stadionul Ion Oblemenco, Craiova
Attendance: 12,050
Referee: Miroslav Zelinka (Czech Republic)

RB Leipzig won 4–2 on aggregate.

== Play-off round ==
=== Summary ===
The first legs were played on 23 August, and the second legs on 30 August 2018.

Team 1	Agg.	Team 2	1st leg	2nd leg
Champions Path
Olimpija Ljubljana (Slovenia)	1–3	(Slovakia) Spartak Trnava	0–2	1–1
APOEL (Cyprus)	1–1 (1–2 p)	(Kazakhstan) Astana	1–0	0–1 (a.e.t.)
Rosenborg (Norway)	5–1	(North Macedonia) Shkëndija	3–1	2–0
F91 Dudelange (Luxembourg)	5–2	(Romania) CFR Cluj	2–0	3–2
Sūduva (Lithuania)	1–4	(Scotland) Celtic	1–1	0–3
Sheriff Tiraspol (Moldova)	1–3	(Azerbaijan) Qarabağ	1–0	0–3
Malmö FF (Sweden)	4–2	(Denmark) Midtjylland	2–2	2–0
Torpedo Kutaisi (Georgia (country))	0–5	(Bulgaria) Ludogorets Razgrad	0–1	0–4
Main Path
Sigma Olomouc (Czech Republic)	0–4	(Spain) Sevilla	0–1	0–3
Sarpsborg 08 (Norway)	4–3	(Israel) Maccabi Tel Aviv	3–1	1–2
Gent (Belgium)	0–2	(France) Bordeaux	0–0	0–2
Partizan (Serbia)	1–4	(Turkey) Beşiktaş	1–1	0–3
Rapid Wien (Austria)	4–3	(Romania) FCSB	3–1	1–2
Basel (Switzerland)	3–3 (a) (Note: Order of legs reversed after original draw.)	(Cyprus) Apollon Limassol	3–2	0–1
Rangers (Scotland)	2–1	(Russia) Ufa	1–0	1–1
Atalanta (Italy)	0–0 (3–4 p)	(Denmark) Copenhagen	0–0	0–0 (a.e.t.)
Zenit Saint Petersburg (Russia)	4–3	(Norway) Molde	3–1	1–2
Trenčín (Slovakia)	1–4	(Cyprus) AEK Larnaca	1–1	0–3
Genk (Belgium)	9–4	(Denmark) Brøndby	5–2	4–2
Olympiacos (Greece)	4–2	(England) Burnley	3–1	1–1
Zorya Luhansk (Ukraine)	2–3	(Germany) RB Leipzig	0–0	2–3

=== Champions Path matches ===
23 August 2018
20:30

Olimpija Ljubljana (Slovenia)	0–2	(Slovakia) Spartak Trnava
	Report	Bakoš 23' (pen.); Ilić 35' (o.g.)

Stožice Stadium, Ljubljana
Attendance: 7,500
Referee: Craig Pawson (England)
30 August 2018
20:30

Spartak Trnava (Slovakia)	1–1	(Slovenia) Olimpija Ljubljana
Godál 12'	Report	Kapun 42'

Štadión Antona Malatinského, Trnava
Attendance: 15,642
Referee: Luca Banti (Italy)

Spartak Trnava won 3–1 on aggregate.

23 August 2018
19:00 (20:00 UTC+3)

APOEL (Cyprus)	1–0	(Kazakhstan) Astana
Caju 79'	Report

GSP Stadium, Nicosia
Attendance: 12,855
Referee: Daniel Siebert (Germany)
30 August 2018
16:00 (20:00 UTC+6)

Astana (Kazakhstan)	1–0 (a.e.t.)	(Cyprus) APOEL
Pedro Henrique 16' (pen.)	Report
Penalties
Richard Almeida (penalty scored); Aničić (penalty missed); Henrique (penalty scored); Beisebekov (penalty missed)	2–1	(penalty scored) Nuno Morais; (penalty missed) De Vincenti; (penalty missed) Efrem; (penalty missed) Dellatorre; (penalty missed) Souza

Astana Arena, Astana
Attendance: 26,000
Referee: Jakob Kehlet (Denmark)

1–1 on aggregate; Astana won 2–1 on penalties.

23 August 2018
20:45

Rosenborg (Norway)	3–1	(North Macedonia) Shkëndija
Jebali 11'; Bendtner 15'; Levi 44'	Report	Stênio Júnior 76'

Lerkendal Stadion, Trondheim
Attendance: 8,767
Referee: Orel Grinfeld (Israel)
30 August 2018
20:15

Shkëndija (North Macedonia)	0–2	(Norway) Rosenborg
	Report	Hovland 67'; Reginiussen 84'

Philip II Arena, Skopje (Note: Shkëndija played their home match at Philip II Arena, Skopje, instead of their regular stadium Ecolog Arena, Tetovo, due to renovation.)
Attendance: 10,950
Referee: Aleksei Kulbakov (Belarus)

Rosenborg won 5–1 on aggregate.

23 August 2018
20:00

F91 Dudelange (Luxembourg)	2–0	(Romania) CFR Cluj
Turpel 67'; Sinani 80'	Report

Stade Josy Barthel, Luxembourg City
Attendance: 2,556
Referee: Andreas Ekberg (Sweden)
30 August 2018
19:00 (20:00 UTC+3)

CFR Cluj (Romania)	2–3	(Luxembourg) F91 Dudelange
Tambe 85'; Omrani 88'	Report	Sinani 51', 54'; Turpel 78'

Stadionul Dr. Constantin Rădulescu, Cluj-Napoca
Attendance: 12,000
Referee: Davide Massa (Italy)

F91 Dudelange won 5–2 on aggregate.

23 August 2018
19:00 (20:00 UTC+3)

Sūduva (Lithuania)	1–1	(Scotland) Celtic
Verbickas 13'	Report	Ntcham 3'

Sūduva Stadium, Marijampolė
Attendance: 5,100
Referee: Ivan Bebek (Croatia)
30 August 2018
21:00 (20:00 UTC+1)

Celtic (Scotland)	3–0	(Lithuania) Sūduva
Griffiths 27'; McGregor 53'; Ajer 61'	Report

Celtic Park, Glasgow
Attendance: 44,639
Referee: Georgi Kabakov (Bulgaria)

Celtic won 4–1 on aggregate.

23 August 2018
19:00 (20:00 UTC+3)

Sheriff Tiraspol (Moldova)	1–0	(Azerbaijan) Qarabağ
Kapić 8'	Report

Sheriff Stadium, Tiraspol
Attendance: 5,073
Referee: Harald Lechner (Austria)
30 August 2018
19:00 (21:00 UTC+4)

Qarabağ (Azerbaijan)	3–0	(Moldova) Sheriff Tiraspol
Medvedev 9'; Guerrier 42'; Ozobić 55'	Report

Tofiq Bahramov Republican Stadium, Baku (Note: Qarabağ played their home match at Tofiq Bahramov Republican Stadium, Baku, instead of their regular stadium Azersun Arena, Baku.)
Attendance: 21,350
Referee: Aleksandar Stavrev (Macedonia)

Qarabağ won 3–1 on aggregate.

23 August 2018
19:15

Malmö FF (Sweden)	2–2	(Denmark) Midtjylland
Rosenberg 12'; Antonsson 25'	Report	Wikheim 60'; Okosun 77'

Stadion, Malmö
Attendance: 11,487
Referee: Srđan Jovanović (Serbia)
30 August 2018
19:15

Midtjylland (Denmark)	0–2	(Sweden) Malmö FF
	Report	Antonsson 32'; Rosenberg 79'

MCH Arena, Herning
Attendance: 9,175
Referee: Serdar Gözübüyük (Netherlands)

Malmö FF won 4–2 on aggregate.

23 August 2018
18:00 (20:00 UTC+4)

Torpedo Kutaisi (Georgia (country))	0–1	(Bulgaria) Ludogorets Razgrad
	Report	Wanderson 45+1'

Mikheil Meskhi Stadium, Tbilisi
Attendance: 17,869
Referee: Hüseyin Göçek (Turkey)
30 August 2018
19:00 (20:00 UTC+3)

Ludogorets Razgrad (Bulgaria)	4–0	(Georgia (country)) Torpedo Kutaisi
Misidjan 6'; Campanharo 38', 59'; Wanderson 62'	Report

Ludogorets Arena, Razgrad
Attendance: 5,340
Referee: Mattias Gestranius (Finland)

Ludogorets Razgrad won 5–0 on aggregate.

=== Main Path matches ===
23 August 2018
19:00

Sigma Olomouc (Czech Republic)	0–1	(Spain) Sevilla
	Report	Sarabia 84'

Andrův stadion, Olomouc
Attendance: 11,709
Referee: Bobby Madden (Scotland)
30 August 2018
21:45

Sevilla (Spain)	3–0	(Czech Republic) Sigma Olomouc
Gonalons 21'; Nešpor 26' (o.g.); Ben Yedder 75'	Report

Ramón Sánchez Pizjuán, Seville
Attendance: 30,311
Referee: István Kovács (Romania)

Sevilla won 4–0 on aggregate.

23 August 2018
19:05

Sarpsborg 08 (Norway)	3–1	(Israel) Maccabi Tel Aviv
Heintz 2'; Lund Nielsen 7' (pen.); Mortensen 56' (pen.)	Report	Kjartansson 13' (pen.)

Sarpsborg Stadion, Sarpsborg
Attendance: 6,363
Referee: Vladislav Bezborodov (Russia)
30 August 2018
19:00 (20:00 UTC+3)

Maccabi Tel Aviv (Israel)	2–1	(Norway) Sarpsborg 08
Atzili 52' (pen.); Atar 60'	Report	Halvorsen 81' (pen.)

Netanya Stadium, Netanya
Attendance: 10,673
Referee: Artur Soares Dias (Portugal)

Sarpsborg 08 won 4–3 on aggregate.

23 August 2018
20:45

Gent (Belgium)	0–0	(France) Bordeaux
	Report

Ghelamco Arena, Ghent
Attendance: 13,239
Referee: Aliyar Aghayev (Azerbaijan)
30 August 2018
20:45

Bordeaux (France)	2–0	(Belgium) Gent
Kamano 10'; Briand 64' (pen.)	Report

Nouveau Stade de Bordeaux, Bordeaux
Attendance: 35,039
Referee: Jesús Gil Manzano (Spain)

Bordeaux won 2–0 on aggregate.

23 August 2018
20:30

Partizan (Serbia)	1–1	(Turkey) Beşiktaş
Ricardo 14'	Report	Arslan 15'

Partizan Stadium, Belgrade
Attendance: 16,240
Referee: Ivan Kružliak (Slovakia)
30 August 2018
20:00 (21:00 UTC+3)

Beşiktaş (Turkey)	3–0	(Serbia) Partizan
Pepe 37', 68'; Özyakup 45+1'	Report

Vodafone Park, Istanbul
Attendance: 33,658
Referee: Ovidiu Hațegan (Romania)

Beşiktaş won 4–1 on aggregate.

23 August 2018
20:30

Rapid Wien (Austria)	3–1	(Romania) FCSB
Knasmüllner 4'; Sonnleitner 40'; Schwab 49'	Report	Gnohéré 47'

Allianz Stadion, Vienna
Attendance: 19,300
Referee: Willie Collum (Scotland)
30 August 2018
20:30 (21:30 UTC+3)

FCSB (Romania)	2–1	(Austria) Rapid Wien
Gnohéré 12'; Roman 45+2'	Report	Sonnleitner 63'

Arena Națională, Bucharest
Attendance: 31,274
Referee: Michael Oliver (England)

Rapid Wien won 4–3 on aggregate.

23 August 2018
20:00

Basel (Switzerland)	3–2	(Cyprus) Apollon Limassol
Van Wolfswinkel 6', 69'; Cömert 84'	Report	Maglica 49'; Papoulis 53'

St. Jakob-Park, Basel
Attendance: 10,743
Referee: Matej Jug (Slovenia)
30 August 2018
19:00 (20:00 UTC+3)

Apollon Limassol (Cyprus)	1–0	(Switzerland) Basel
Kyriakou 53'	Report

GSP Stadium, Nicosia
Attendance: 4,005
Referee: Ruddy Buquet (France)

3–3 on aggregate; Apollon Limassol won on away goals.

23 August 2018
20:45 (19:45 UTC+1)

Rangers (Scotland)	1–0	(Russia) Ufa
Goldson 41'	Report

Ibrox Stadium, Glasgow
Attendance: 49,338
Referee: Daniel Stefański (Poland)
30 August 2018
16:00 (19:00 UTC+5)

Ufa (Russia)	1–1	(Scotland) Rangers
Sysuyev 32'	Report	Ejaria 9'

Neftyanik Stadium, Ufa
Attendance: 13,186
Referee: Tobias Stieler (Germany)

Rangers won 2–1 on aggregate.

23 August 2018
20:00

Atalanta (Italy)	0–0	(Denmark) Copenhagen
	Report

Mapei Stadium – Città del Tricolore, Reggio Emilia
Attendance: 7,680
Referee: Pavel Královec (Czech Republic)
30 August 2018
18:30

Copenhagen (Denmark)	0–0 (a.e.t.)	(Italy) Atalanta
	Report
Penalties
Sotiriou (penalty scored); Greguš (penalty scored); Skov (penalty scored); N'Doye (penalty missed); Vavro (penalty scored)	4–3	(penalty scored) De Roon; (penalty scored) Kadhim; (penalty missed) Gómez; (penalty scored) Masiello; (penalty missed) Cornelius

Parken Stadium, Copenhagen
Attendance: 18,378
Referee: Anastasios Sidiropoulos (Greece)

0–0 on aggregate; Copenhagen won 4–3 on penalties.

23 August 2018
18:00 (19:00 UTC+3)

Zenit Saint Petersburg (Russia)	3–1	(Norway) Molde
Dzyuba 71'; Zabolotny 80'; Mevlja 90'	Report	Hestad 42'

Krestovsky Stadium, Saint Petersburg
Attendance: 40,677
Referee: Deniz Aytekin (Germany)
30 August 2018
19:00

Molde (Norway)	2–1	(Russia) Zenit Saint Petersburg
Hestad 65'; Haaland 77'	Report	Kuzyayev 21'

Aker Stadion, Molde
Attendance: 5,414
Referee: Carlos del Cerro Grande (Spain)

Zenit Saint Petersburg won 4–3 on aggregate.

23 August 2018
18:30

Trenčín (Slovakia)	1–1	(Cyprus) AEK Larnaca
Sleegers 55'	Report	Acorán 60'

Štadión pod Dubňom, Žilina
Attendance: 6,107
Referee: Antonio Mateu Lahoz (Spain)
30 August 2018
17:30 (18:30 UTC+3)

AEK Larnaca (Cyprus)	3–0	(Slovakia) Trenčín
Giannou 1', 65'; Acorán 36'	Report

AEK Arena – Georgios Karapatakis, Larnaca
Attendance: 4,777
Referee: Sergei Karasev (Russia)

AEK Larnaca won 4–1 on aggregate.

23 August 2018
20:30

Genk (Belgium)	5–2	(Denmark) Brøndby
Samatta 37', 55', 70'; Trossard 45' (pen.), 90+1'	Report	Hermannsson 47'; Wilczek 51'

Luminus Arena, Genk
Attendance: 12,110
Referee: Andris Treimanis (Latvia)
30 August 2018
20:30

Brøndby (Denmark)	2–4	(Belgium) Genk
Wilczek 34'; Larsson 58'	Report	Malinovskyi 15'; Ndongala 33'; Dewaest 66'; Samatta 87'

Brøndby Stadium, Brøndbyvester
Attendance: 8,636
Referee: Gediminas Mažeika (Lithuania)

Genk won 9–4 on aggregate.

23 August 2018
20:00 (21:00 UTC+3)

Olympiacos (Greece)	3–1	(England) Burnley
Fortounis 19', 60' (pen.); Bouchalakis 49'	Report	Wood 33' (pen.)

Karaiskakis Stadium, Piraeus
Attendance: 25,010
Referee: Slavko Vinčić (Slovenia)
30 August 2018
20:45 (19:45 UTC+1)

Burnley (England)	1–1	(Greece) Olympiacos
Vydra 86'	Report	Podence 83'

Turf Moor, Burnley
Attendance: 15,234
Referee: Viktor Kassai (Hungary)

Olympiacos won 4–2 on aggregate.

23 August 2018
20:30 (21:30 UTC+3)

Zorya Luhansk (Ukraine)	0–0	(Germany) RB Leipzig
	Report

Slavutych-Arena, Zaporizhia
Attendance: 5,127
Referee: Benoît Bastien (France)
30 August 2018
18:30

RB Leipzig (Germany)	3–2	(Ukraine) Zorya Luhansk
Cunha 7'; Augustin 69'; Forsberg 90' (pen.)	Report	Rafael Ratão 35'; Hordiyenko 48'

Red Bull Arena, Leipzig
Attendance: 17,644
Referee: Danny Makkelie (Netherlands)

RB Leipzig won 3–2 on aggregate.
