= 2019–20 Atalanta BC season =

Atalanta
2019–20 season
- President: Antonio Percassi
- Manager: Gian Piero Gasperini
- Stadium: Gewiss Stadium (domestic matches); San Siro, Milan (European matches)
- Serie A: 3rd
- Coppa Italia: Round of 16
- UEFA Champions League: Quarter-finals
- Top goalscorer: League: Luis Muriel; Duván Zapata (18 each); All: Josip Iličić (21)
Home colours	Away colours	Third colours

The 2019–20 season was Atalanta Bergamasca Calcio's ninth consecutive season in Serie A, the top-flight of Italian football. The club competed in Serie A, the Coppa Italia, and, for the first time ever following their third-place finish the previous season, in the UEFA Champions League.

The season was coach Gian Piero Gasperini's fourth at the club, following the 4th, 7th, and 3rd-place finishes in the 2016–17, 2017–18, and 2018–19 seasons, respectively.

Following an agreement reached with both Milan clubs, Atalanta played their Champions League home matches at San Siro. Atalanta qualified for the Champions League round of 16 for the first time in their history, and the first time a club has advanced to the round of 16 after losing its opening three matches. Amid the coronavirus pandemic in Italy, on March 25, the Associated Press dubbed the Champions League match between Atalanta and Spanish club Valencia at the San Siro in Milan on 19 February as "Game Zero". The match was the first leg of the round of 16, and had an attendance of over 40,000 people—about one third of Bergamo's population. By March 24, almost 7,000 people in the province of Bergamo had tested positive for COVID-19, and more than 1,000 people had died from the virus, making Bergamo the hardest-hit province in all of Italy during the pandemic.

With Iličić, Muriel, and Zapata all scoring over 15 league goals, they became the first club to have three players strike at least 15 times in Serie A since Juventus achieved the feat almost 70 years prior in 1951–52. On 21 July 2020, Atalanta reached 95 goals in Serie A, the highest by any side in a single season for more than 60 years. Atalanta would end up finishing the season with 98 goals in Serie A.

== Players ==
=== Squad information ===
Last updated on 1 March 2020
Appearances include league matches only

No.	Name	Nat	Position(s)	Date of birth (age)	Signed from	Signed in	Contract ends	Apps.	Goals
Goalkeepers
31	Francesco Rossi	(Italy)	GK	27 April 1991 (age 35)	(Italy) Youth Sector	2009	2020	2	0
57	Marco Sportiello	(Italy)	GK	10 May 1992 (age 34)	(Italy) Carpi	2013	2020	91	0
95	Pierluigi Gollini	(Italy)	GK	18 March 1995 (age 31)	(England) Aston Villa	2017	2023	61	0
Defenders
2	Rafael Tolói	(Brazil)	CB	10 October 1990 (age 36)	(Brazil) São Paulo	2015	2020	149	8
3	Mattia Caldara	(Italy)	CB	5 May 1994 (age 32)	(Italy) Milan	2020	2021	2	0
4	Boško Šutalo	(Croatia)	CB / RB / LB	1 January 2000 (age 26)	(Croatia) Osijek	2020	2024	0	0
6	José Luis Palomino	(Argentina)	CB	5 January 1990 (age 36)	(Bulgaria) Ludogorets Razgrad	2017	2020	77	3
7	Lennart Czyborra	(Germany)	LB	3 May 1999 (age 27)	(Netherlands) Heracles Almelo	2020	2024	0	0
8	Robin Gosens	(Germany)	LB / LWB / LM	5 July 1994 (age 32)	(Netherlands) Heracles Almelo	2017	2020	71	11
19	Berat Djimsiti	(Albania)	CB / RB / LB	19 February 1993 (age 33)	(Switzerland) Zürich	2016	2019	49	2
21	Timothy Castagne	(Belgium)	RB / LB	5 December 1995 (age 30)	(Belgium) Genk	2017	2020	62	5
22	Raoul Bellanova	(Italy)	RB	17 May 2000 (age 26)	(France) Bordeaux	2020	2021	0	0
33	Hans Hateboer	(Netherlands)	RB	9 January 1994 (age 32)	(Netherlands) Groningen	2017	2022	95	5
Midfielders
5	Adrien Tameze	(France)	CM	4 February 1994 (age 32)	(France) Nice	2020	2020	2	0
11	Remo Freuler	(Switzerland)	CM	15 April 1992 (age 34)	(Switzerland) Luzern	2016	2023	129	15
15	Marten de Roon	(Netherlands)	CM	29 March 1991 (age 35)	(England) Middlesbrough	2017	2022	91	6
18	Ruslan Malinovskyi	(Ukraine)	CM / AM / RW	4 May 1993 (age 33)	(Belgium) Genk	2019	2024	22	3
72	Josip Iličić	(Slovenia)	AM / RW / SS	29 January 1988 (age 38)	(Italy) Fiorentina	2017	2020	83	38
88	Mario Pašalić	(Croatia)	CM / DM / AM	9 February 1995 (age 31)	(England) Chelsea	2018	2020	56	10
Forwards
9	Luis Muriel	(Colombia)	CF / ST	16 April 1991 (age 35)	(Spain) Sevilla	2019	2023	22	13
10	Alejandro Gómez	(Argentina)	LW / SS	15 February 1988 (age 38)	(Ukraine) Metalist Kharkiv	2014	2022	187	45
17	Roberto Piccoli	(Italy)	CF	27 January 2001 (age 25)	(Italy) Youth Sector			2	0
79	Amad	(Ivory Coast)	RW / LW / AM	11 July 2002 (age 24)	(Italy) Youth Sector	2019		3	1
90	Ebrima Colley	(The Gambia)	LW / AM / CM	1 February 2000 (age 26)	(Italy) Youth Sector	2019		1	0
91	Duván Zapata	(Colombia)	CF	1 April 1991 (age 35)	(Italy) Sampdoria	2018	2023	52	34
Players transferred during the season
4	Simon Kjær	(Denmark)	CB / DM	26 March 1989 (age 37)	(Spain) Sevilla	2019	2020	5	0
5	Andrea Masiello	(Italy)	CB / RB	5 February 1986 (age 40)	(Italy) Bari	2011	2020	157	8
7	Arkadiusz Reca	(Poland)	LB	17 June 1995 (age 31)	(Poland) Wisła Płock	2018	2022	3	0
13	Guilherme Arana	(Brazil)	LB	14 April 1997 (age 29)	(Spain) Sevilla	2019	2020	4	0
41	Roger Ibañez	(Brazil)	CB	23 November 1998 (age 27)	(Brazil) Fluminense	2019	2023	1	0
99	Musa Barrow	(The Gambia)	CF / LW	14 November 1998 (age 27)	(Italy) Youth Sector	2017	2020	41	4

== Transfers ==
=== In ===
Date	Pos.	Player	Age	Moving from	Fee	Notes	Source
1 July 2019	FW	(Colombia) Luis Muriel	28	(Spain) Sevilla	€15M		
2 July 2019	DF	(Italy) Marco Varnier	21	(Italy) Cittadella	€5M	signed permanently after obligation to buy	
16 July 2019	MF	(Ukraine) Ruslan Malinovskyi	26	(Belgium) Genk	€13.7M		
9 August 2019	DF	(Slovakia) Martin Škrtel	34	(Turkey) Fenerbahçe	Free		

==== Loans in ====
Date	Pos.	Player	Age	Moving from	Fee	Notes	Source
28 August 2019	DF	(Brazil) Guilherme Arana	22	(Spain) Sevilla	Loan	Loan with an option to buy for €8–9M	
2 September 2019	DF	(Denmark) Simon Kjær	30	(Spain) Sevilla	Loan		
12 January 2020	DF	(Italy) Mattia Caldara	25	(Italy) Milan	Loan	18-month loan with a €15M option to buy	

=== Out ===
Date	Pos.	Player	Age	Moving to	Fee	Notes	Source
1 July 2019	MF	(Ivory Coast) Franck Kessié	22	(Italy) Milan	€24M	signed permanently after obligation to buy	
1 July 2019	MF	(Italy) Bryan Cristante	24	(Italy) Roma	€21M	signed permanently after obligation to buy	
1 July 2019	FW	(Italy) Andrea Petagna	24	(Italy) SPAL	€12M	signed permanently after obligation to buy	
2 September 2019	DF	(Slovakia) Martin Škrtel	34	(Turkey) İstanbul Başakşehir	Free	Contract terminated by mutual consent	

==== Loans out ====
Date	Pos.	Player	Age	Moving to	Fee	Notes	Source
28 August 2019	DF	(Poland) Arkadiusz Reca	24	(Italy) SPAL	Loan	Loan with an option to buy and counter-option	

== Pre-season and friendlies ==
18 July 2019 Trofeo Fra.mar	Atalanta (Italy)	9–0	(Italy) Brusaporto	Clusone, Italy
16:00 CEST (UTC+2)	Colley 4', 10'; Tomasi 16' (o.g.); Esposito 32' (o.g.); Malinovskyi 35' (pen.); Traoré 55', 57', 70'; Muriel 66'	Report		Stadium: Centro Sportivo Comunale di Clusone

21 July 2019 Friendly	Atalanta (Italy)	6–0	(Italy) Renate	Clusone, Italy
18:00 CEST (UTC+2)	Barrow 1', 13'; Gómez 9'; Colley 46', 67'; Muriel 52'	Report		Stadium: Centro Sportivo Comunale di Clusone; Referee: Giorgio Bozzetto (Italy)
Note: Match played with two 35-minute halves.

27 July 2019 Friendly	Swansea City (Wales)	2–1	(Italy) Atalanta	Swansea, Wales
15:00 BST (UTC+1)	Hateboer 62' (o.g.); Roberts 67'	Report	Iličić 5'	Stadium: Liberty Stadium

30 July 2019 Friendly	Norwich City (England)	1–4	(Italy) Atalanta	Norwich, England
19:00 BST (UTC+1)	Cantwell 16'	Report	Muriel 45', 62'; Pašalić 85'; Barrow 90+1'	Stadium: Carrow Road

2 August 2019 Friendly	Leicester City (England)	2–1	(Italy) Atalanta	Leicester, England
19:45 BST (UTC+1)	Pérez 62'; Vardy 76'	Report	Muriel 89' (pen.)	Stadium: King Power Stadium; Referee: Graham Scott (England)

10 August 2019 Friendly	Getafe (Spain)	4–1	(Italy) Atalanta	Getafe, Spain
21:00 CEST (UTC+2)	Arambarri 9'; Bergara 62'; Olivera 82'; Ángel 90'	Report	Muriel 64' (pen.)	Stadium: Coliseum Alfonso Pérez; Referee: Carlos del Cerro Grande (Spain)

== Competitions ==
=== Overview ===
Competition	First match	Last match	Starting round	Final position	Record							
Competition	First match	Last match	Starting round	Final position	Pld	W	D	L	GF	GA	GD	Win %
Serie A	24 August 2019	1 August 2020	Matchday 1	3rd	38	23	9	6	98	48	+50	60.53
Coppa Italia	15 January 2020		Round of 16	Round of 16	1	0	0	1	1	2	−1	0.00
Champions League	18 September 2019	12 August 2020	Group stage	Quarter-finals	9	4	1	4	17	18	−1	44.44
Total					48	27	10	11	116	68	+48	56.25

Source: Competitions

=== Serie A ===
==== League table ====
Pos	Team	Pld	W	D	L	GF	GA	GD	Pts	Qualification or relegation
1	Juventus (C)	38	26	5	7	76	43	+33	83	Qualification for the Champions League group stage
2	Internazionale	38	24	10	4	81	36	+45	82	Qualification for the Champions League group stage
3	Atalanta	38	23	9	6	98	48	+50	78 (Note: Atalanta finished ahead of Lazio on head-to-head points: Lazio 3–3 Atalanta, Atalanta 3–2 Lazio.)	Qualification for the Champions League group stage
4	Lazio	38	24	6	8	79	42	+37	78	Qualification for the Champions League group stage
5	Roma	38	21	7	10	77	51	+26	70	Qualification for the Europa League group stage

Source: Serie A, Soccerway
Rules for classification: 1) Points; 2) Head-to-head points; 3) Head-to-head goal difference; 4) Goal difference; 5) Goals scored; 6) Draw. (Note: Head-to-head record is used only after all the matches between the teams in question have been played)
(C) Champions

==== Results summary ====
Overall								Home						Away					
Pld	W	D	L	GF	GA	GD	Pts	W	D	L	GF	GA	GD	W	D	L	GF	GA	GD
38	23	9	6	98	48	+50	78	12	2	5	51	26	+25	11	7	1	47	22	+25

Source: Competitive matches

==== Results by round ====
Round	1	2	3	4	5	6	7	8	9	10	11	12	13	14	15	16	17	18	19	20	21	22	23	24	25	26	27	28	29	30	31	32	33	34	35	36	37	38
Ground	A	H	A	H	A	A	H	A	H	A	H	A	H	A	H	A	H	H	A	H	A	H	A	H	H	A	H	A	H	A	H	A	H	A	H	A	A	H
Result	W	L	W	D	W	W	W	D	W	D	L	D	L	W	W	L	W	W	D	L	W	D	W	W	W	W	W	W	W	W	W	D	W	D	W	D	W	L
Position	4	11	5	6	3	3	3	3	3	3	5	5	6	6	6	6	5	5	4	5	5	4	4	4	4	4	4	4	4	4	3	4	3	3	2	3	3	3

Source: Competitive matches
A = Away; H = Home; W = Win; D = Draw; L = Loss

==== Matches ====
25 August 2019 1	SPAL	2–3	Atalanta	Ferrara
20:45 CEST (UTC+02:00)	Di Francesco 7'; Petagna 27'; Valoti (yellow card) 61'; Cionek (yellow card) 90+3'	Report	Gosens 34'; De Roon (yellow card) 43'; Muriel 71', 76'	Stadium: Stadio Paolo Mazza; Attendance: 11,706; Referee: Gianluca Manganiello

1 September 2019 2	Atalanta	2–3	Torino	Parma
20:45 CEST (UTC+02:00)	Zapata 38', 54'; Hateboer (yellow card) 65'; De Roon (yellow card) 76'	Report	Berenguer (yellow card) 21', (goal) 57'; Bonifazi 24'; Izzo 66'	Stadium: Stadio Ennio Tardini; Attendance: 8,182; Referee: Daniele Doveri
Note: Match played at the Stadio Ennio Tardini in Parma due to renovation work on Atalanta's home ground, the Stadio Atleti Azzurri d'Italia.

15 September 2019 3	Genoa	1–2	Atalanta	Genoa
12:30 CEST (UTC+02:00)	Romero (yellow card) 31'; C. Zapata (yellow card) 63'; Criscito 90+1' (pen.); Pandev (yellow card) 90+2'	Report	Masiello (yellow card) 44'; Iličić (yellow card) 45+1'; Hateboer (yellow card) 48'; Muriel 64' (pen.); D. Zapata 90+5'	Stadium: Stadio Luigi Ferraris; Attendance: 23,395; Referee: Michael Fabbri

22 September 2019 4	Atalanta	2–2	Fiorentina	Parma
18:00 CEST (UTC+02:00)	Pašalić (yellow card) 8'; De Roon (yellow card) 76'; Iličić 84'; Castagne 90+5'	Report	Pezzella (yellow card) 1'; Palomino 24' (o.g.); Lirola (yellow card) 46'; Milenković (yellow card) 52'; Ribéry 66'; Boateng (yellow card) 88'; Drągowski (yellow card) 90'	Stadium: Stadio Ennio Tardini; Attendance: 10,314; Referee: Daniele Orsato
Note: Match played at the Stadio Ennio Tardini in Parma due to renovation work on Atalanta's home ground, the Stadio Atleti Azzurri d'Italia.

25 September 2019 5	Roma	0–2	Atalanta	Rome
19:00 CEST (UTC+02:00)	Zaniolo (yellow card) 40'; Juan Jesus (yellow card) 89'	Report	Kjær (yellow card) 25'; Zapata 71'; De Roon 90'	Stadium: Stadio Olimpico; Attendance: 31,832; Referee: Massimiliano Irrati

28 September 2019 6	Sassuolo	1–4	Atalanta	Reggio Emilia
20:45 CEST (UTC+02:00)	Berardi (yellow card) 33'; Ferrari (yellow card) 44'; Defrel 62'	Report	Gómez 6', 29'; Gosens 13'; Zapata 35'; Tolói (yellow card) 70'; Malinovskyi (yellow card) 87'	Stadium: Mapei Stadium – Città del Tricolore; Attendance: 12,500; Referee: Paolo Valeri

6 October 2019 7	Atalanta	3–1	Lecce	Bergamo
15:00 CEST (UTC+02:00)	Zapata 35'; Gómez 40'; Gosens 56'; Kjær (yellow card) 63'; De Roon (yellow card) 73'	Report	Lucioni (yellow card) 62', (goal) 86'; Majer (yellow card) 84'; Rispoli (yellow card) 89'	Stadium: Gewiss Stadium; Attendance: 20,771; Referee: Marco Di Bello

19 October 2019 8	Lazio	3–3	Atalanta	Rome
15:00 CEST (UTC+02:00)	Marušić (yellow card) 27'; Parolo (yellow card) 33'; Lulić (yellow card) 49'; Immobile 69' (pen.), 90+3' (pen.), (yellow card) 90+3'; Correa 70'; Milinković-Savić (yellow card) 80'	Report	Muriel 23', 28'; Gómez 37'; Gollini (yellow card) 58'; Tolói (yellow card) 60'	Stadium: Stadio Olimpico; Attendance: 30,000; Referee: Gianluca Rocchi

27 October 2019 9	Atalanta	7–1	Udinese	Bergamo
15:00 CET (UTC+01:00)	Iličić 21', 43'; Djimsiti (yellow card) 26'; Muriel 35' (pen.), 48', 75' (pen.); Pašalić 52'; Amad 83'; Hateboer (yellow card) 88'	Report	Opoku (yellow card) 7' (yellow-red card) 32'; Okaka 12'; Samir (yellow card) 74'	Stadium: Gewiss Stadium; Attendance: 18,677; Referee: Fabio Maresca

30 October 2019 10	Napoli	2–2	Atalanta	Naples
19:00 CET (UTC+01:00)	Maksimović 16', (yellow card) 48'; Milik 71'; Di Lorenzo (yellow card) 84'; Insigne (yellow card) 88'	Report	Tolói (yellow card) 20'; Freuler 41'; De Roon (yellow card) 64'; Pašalić (yellow card) 67'; Iličić 86'	Stadium: Stadio San Paolo; Attendance: 30,061; Referee: Piero Giacomelli

3 November 2019 11	Atalanta	0–2	Cagliari	Bergamo
12:30 CET (UTC+01:00)	Iličić (red card) 39'; Malinovskyi (yellow card) 67'; Tolói (yellow card) 70'	Report	Rog (yellow card) 15'; Lykogiannis (yellow card) 25'; Pašalić 32' (o.g.); Oliva (yellow card) 56', (goal) 58'	Stadium: Gewiss Stadium; Attendance: 18,617; Referee: Rosario Abisso

10 November 2019 12	Sampdoria	0–0	Atalanta	Genoa
15:00 CET (UTC+01:00)	Depaoli (yellow card) 66'; Ferrari (yellow card) 71'	Report	Castagne (yellow card) 21'; Malinovskyi (yellow card) 51' (yellow-red card) 74'; Gómez (yellow card) 66'	Stadium: Stadio Luigi Ferraris; Attendance: 19,799; Referee: Massimiliano Irrati

23 November 2019 13	Atalanta	1–3	Juventus	Bergamo
15:00 CET (UTC+01:00)	Palomino (yellow card) 10'; Freuler (yellow card) 41'; Gosens (yellow card) 45', (goal) 56'; Tolói (yellow card) 62'; Gollini (yellow card) 83'	Report	Higuaín (yellow card) 7', (goal) 74', 82'; Dybala (yellow card) 27', (goal) 90+2'; Cuadrado (yellow card) 45+2'	Stadium: Gewiss Stadium; Attendance: 20,899; Referee: Gianluca Rocchi

30 November 2019 14	Brescia	0–3	Atalanta	Brescia
15:00 CET (UTC+01:00)	Torregrossa (yellow card) 19'	Report	Castagne (yellow card) 11'; Pašalić 26', 61'; Palomino (yellow card) 57'; Malinovskyi (yellow card) 79'; Iličić 90+2'	Stadium: Stadio Mario Rigamonti; Attendance: 14,000; Referee: Daniele Doveri

7 December 2019 15	Atalanta	3–2	Hellas Verona	Bergamo
15:00 CET (UTC+01:00)	Hateboer (yellow card) 20'; Malinovskyi 44'; Muriel 64' (pen.); Djimsiti 90+3'	Report	Di Carmine 23', 57'; Veloso (yellow card) 32'; Bocchetti (yellow card) 41'; Zaccagni (yellow card) 63'; Dawidowicz (yellow card) 68' (yellow-red card) 86'	Stadium: Gewiss Stadium; Attendance: 19,335; Referee: Paolo Valeri

15 December 2019 16	Bologna	2–1	Atalanta	Bologna
15:00 CET (UTC+01:00)	Palacio 12', (yellow card) 76'; Poli 53'; Orsolini (yellow card) 62'; Sansone (yellow card) 71'; Danilo (yellow card) 86' (yellow-red card) 88'	Report	Pašalić (yellow card) 32'; Malinovskyi 60'	Stadium: Stadio Renato Dall'Ara; Attendance: 21,277; Referee: Davide Massa

22 December 2019 17	Atalanta	5–0	Milan	Bergamo
12:30 CET (UTC+01:00)	Gómez 10'; Castagne (yellow card) 46'; De Roon (yellow card) 56'; Pašalić 61'; Iličić 63', 72'; Muriel 84'	Report	Musacchio (yellow card) 37'; Suso (yellow card) 44'; Romagnoli (yellow card) 71'; Kessié (yellow card) 77'	Stadium: Gewiss Stadium; Attendance: 20,940; Referee: Federico La Penna

6 January 2020 18	Atalanta	5–0	Parma	Bergamo
15:00 CET (UTC+01:00)	Gómez 11', (yellow card) 29'; Freuler 34', (yellow card) 70'; Gosens 43'; Iličić 60', 71'	Report	Barillà (yellow card) 8'; Pezzella (yellow card) 27'; Kucka (yellow card) 57'; Hernani (yellow card) 72'	Stadium: Gewiss Stadium; Attendance: 19,217; Referee: Fabrizio Pasqua

11 January 2020 19	Internazionale	1–1	Atalanta	Milan
20:45 CET (UTC+01:00)	Martínez 4'; Sensi (yellow card) 65'; Godín (yellow card) 83'	Report	Hateboer (yellow card) 8'; De Roon (yellow card) 24'; Palomino (yellow card) 42'; Gosens 75'; Malinovskyi (yellow card) 89'	Stadium: San Siro; Attendance: 70,042; Referee: Gianluca Rocchi

20 January 2020 20	Atalanta	1–2	SPAL	Bergamo
20:45 CET (UTC+01:00)	Iličić 16'; De Roon (yellow card) 40'; Palomino (yellow card) 50'	Report	Valoti (yellow card) 5', (goal) 60'; Vicari (yellow card) 21'; Di Francesco (yellow card) 45'; Petagna 54'	Stadium: Gewiss Stadium; Attendance: 18,313; Referee: Federico La Penna

25 January 2020 21	Torino	0–7	Atalanta	Turin
20:45 CET (UTC+01:00)	Izzo (yellow card) 44' (yellow-red card) 76'; Lukić (red card) 89'; Sirigu (yellow card) 90'	Report	Iličić 17', 53', 54'; Gosens 29'; De Roon (yellow card) 38'; Zapata 45+1' (pen.); Muriel 86' (pen.), 88'; Hateboer (yellow card) 90'	Stadium: Stadio Olimpico Grande Torino; Attendance: 18,824; Referee: Marco Guida

2 February 2020 22	Atalanta	2–2	Genoa	Bergamo
15:00 CET (UTC+01:00)	Tolói 13'; Iličić 35'; Pašalić (yellow card) 52'; De Roon (yellow card) 77'	Report	Criscito 19' (pen.), (yellow card) 90+2'; Sanabria 33'; Behrami (yellow card) 53' (yellow-red card) 82'; Romero (yellow card) 76'; Cassata (yellow card) 84'; Perin (yellow card) 89'	Stadium: Gewiss Stadium; Attendance: 18,755; Referee: Davide Massa

8 February 2020 23	Fiorentina	1–2	Atalanta	Florence
15:00 CET (UTC+01:00)	Castrovilli (yellow card) 16'; Chiesa 32'; Vlahović (yellow card) 60'	Report	Zapata (yellow card) 27', (goal) 49'; Gollini (yellow card) 33'; Malinovskyi 72'	Stadium: Stadio Artemio Franchi; Attendance: 35,034; Referee: Maurizio Mariani

15 February 2020 24	Atalanta	2–1	Roma	Bergamo
20:45 CET (UTC+01:00)	Palomino 50'; Gosens (yellow card) 55'; Pašalić 59'	Report	Mancini (yellow card) 11'; Mkhitaryan (yellow card) 27'; Džeko 45'; Fazio (yellow card) 88'; Pérez (yellow card) 90+3'	Stadium: Gewiss Stadium; Attendance: 19,830; Referee: Daniele Orsato

1 March 2020 26	Lecce	2–7	Atalanta	Lecce
15:00 CET (UTC+01:00)	Saponara 29', (yellow card) 70'; Donati 40'; Lucioni (yellow card) 66'	Report	Donati 17' (o.g.); Zapata 22', 54', 62'; Hateboer (yellow card) 45+1'; Iličić 47'; Palomino (yellow card) 57'; Muriel 87'; Malinovskyi 90+2'	Stadium: Stadio Via del Mare; Attendance: 21,344; Referee: Davide Massa

21 June 2020 25	Atalanta	4–1	Sassuolo	Bergamo
19:30 CEST (UTC+02:00)	Djimsiti 16', (yellow card) 75'; Zapata 31', 66'; Bourabia 37' (o.g.); Pašalić (yellow card) 40'; Muriel (yellow card) 82'; Tolói (yellow card) 90+1'	Report	Toljan (yellow card) 9'; Peluso (yellow card) 45+2'; Marlon (yellow card) 65'; Bourabia 90+2'	Stadium: Gewiss Stadium; Attendance: 0 Referee: Daniele Chiffi
Note: Match was initially postponed to 11 March and then to 21 June from its original date of 23 February due to concerns over the COVID-19 pandemic, after it was moved to 18 March to be played behind closed doors. All subsequent matches were also shuffled to allow for this accommodation. However, on 9 March, all sports events in Italy were suspended until 3 April. This was the first match played since the COVID-19 pandemic lockdown in Italy.

24 June 2020 27	Atalanta	3–2	Lazio	Bergamo
21:45 CEST (UTC+02:00)	Gosens 38'; Tolói (yellow card) 52'; De Roon (yellow card) 56'; Malinovskyi 66'; Palomino 80'	Report	De Roon 5' (o.g.); Milinković-Savić 11', (yellow card) 72'; Patric (yellow card) 85'	Stadium: Gewiss Stadium; Attendance: 0 Referee: Daniele Orsato
Note: Match was postponed to 15 March from its original date of 7 March due to schedule shuffling to allow for previous postponements to be played due to concerns over the COVID-19 pandemic.

28 June 2020 28	Udinese	2–3	Atalanta	Udine
19:30 CEST (UTC+02:00)	Lasagna 31', 87'; Becão (yellow card) 70'; Zeegelaar (yellow card) 77'	Report	Zapata 9'; Malinovskyi (yellow card) 40'; Muriel 71', 79'; Caldara (yellow card) 76'	Stadium: Dacia Arena; Attendance: 0 Referee: Marco Di Bello

2 July 2020 29	Atalanta	2–0	Napoli	Bergamo
19:30 CEST (UTC+02:00)	Pašalić 47'; Gosens 55'; Tolói (yellow card) 88'	Report	Mário Rui (yellow card) 67'	Stadium: Gewiss Stadium; Attendance: 0 Referee: Daniele Doveri

5 July 2020 30	Cagliari	0–1	Atalanta	Cagliari
19:30 CEST (UTC+02:00)	Carboni (yellow card) 5', (red card) 26'; Pisacane (yellow card) 44'; Nández (yellow card) 70'	Report	Muriel 27' (pen.); Palomino (yellow card) 62'; Hateboer (yellow card) 71'	Stadium: Sardegna Arena; Attendance: 0 Referee: Federico La Penna

8 July 2020 31	Atalanta	2–0	Sampdoria	Bergamo
21:45 CEST (UTC+02:00)	Djimsiti (yellow card) 24'; Tolói 75'; Muriel 85'; Castagne (yellow card) 90+5'	Report	Thorsby (yellow card) 35'; Jankto (yellow card) 56'; Bereszyński (yellow card) 65'	Stadium: Gewiss Stadium; Attendance: 0 Referee: Antonio Giua

11 July 2020 32	Juventus	2–2	Atalanta	Turin
21:45 CEST (UTC+02:00)	Bernardeschi (yellow card) 10'; Cuadrado (yellow card) 29'; Ronaldo 55' (pen.), 90' (pen.); Rabiot (yellow card) 73'	Report	Zapata 16'; Pašalić (yellow card) 61'; Malinovskyi 81'; Hateboer (yellow card) 88'	Stadium: Allianz Stadium; Attendance: 0 Referee: Piero Giacomelli

14 July 2020 33	Atalanta	6–2	Brescia	Bergamo
21:45 CEST (UTC+02:00)	Pašalić 2', 55', 58'; De Roon 25'; Malinovskyi 28'; Zapata 30'	Report	Torregrossa 8'; Špalek 83'	Stadium: Gewiss Stadium; Attendance: 0 Referee: Gianluca Manganiello

18 July 2020 34	Hellas Verona	1–1	Atalanta	Verona
17:15 CEST (UTC+02:00)	Amrabat (yellow card) 41'; Pessina 59', (yellow card) 84'	Report	Zapata 50'; Hateboer (yellow card) 64'; Tolói (yellow card) 85'	Stadium: Stadio Marc'Antonio Bentegodi; Attendance: 0 Referee: Rosario Abisso

21 July 2020 35	Atalanta	1–0	Bologna	Bergamo
19:30 CEST (UTC+02:00)	Muriel 63'; Freuler (yellow card) 70'; Gosens (yellow card) 83'; Colley (yellow card) 90+3'; De Roon (yellow card) 90+4'	Report	Tomiyasu (yellow card) 30'; Danilo (yellow card) 76'	Stadium: Gewiss Stadium; Attendance: 0 Referee: Federico La Penna

24 July 2020 36	Milan	1–1	Atalanta	Milan
21:45 CEST (UTC+02:00)	Çalhanoğlu 14'; Biglia (yellow card) 25'	Report	Zapata 34'; Tolói (yellow card) 38'	Stadium: San Siro; Attendance: 0 Referee: Daniele Doveri

28 July 2020 37	Parma	1–2	Atalanta	Parma
19:30 CEST (UTC+02:00)	Darmian (yellow card) 19'; Kulusevski 43'; Kucka (yellow card) 45+3'	Report	Šutalo (yellow card) 6'; Malinovskyi 70'; Gómez 84'	Stadium: Stadio Ennio Tardini; Attendance: 0 Referee: Luca Pairetto

1 August 2020 38	Atalanta	0–2	Internazionale	Bergamo
20:45 CEST (UTC+02:00)	Djimsiti (yellow card) 25'; Tolói (yellow card) 44'	Report	D'Ambrosio 1'; Young 20'; De Vrij (yellow card) 23'; Brozović (yellow card) 56'; Handanović (yellow card) 86'	Stadium: Gewiss Stadium; Attendance: 0 Referee: Piero Giacomelli

=== Coppa Italia ===
15 January 2020 Round of 16	Fiorentina	2–1	Atalanta	Florence
15:00 CET (UTC+01:00)	Cutrone 11'; Pezzella (yellow card) 45+1' (yellow-red card) 70'; Dalbert (yellow card) 81'; Lirola 84'	Report	Caldara (yellow card) 34'; Djimsiti (yellow card) 50'; Iličić 67'	Stadium: Stadio Artemio Franchi; Attendance: 13,395; Referee: Gianluca Manganiello

=== UEFA Champions League ===
==== Group stage ====
Pos	Team	Pld	W	D	L	GF	GA	GD	Pts	Qualification	MCI	ATA	SHK	DZG
1	(England) Manchester City	6	4	2	0	16	4	+12	14	Advance to knockout phase	—	5–1	1–1	2–0
2	(Italy) Atalanta	6	2	1	3	8	12	−4	7	Advance to knockout phase	1–1	—	1–2	2–0
3	(Ukraine) Shakhtar Donetsk	6	1	3	2	8	13	−5	6	Transfer to Europa League	0–3	0–3	—	2–2
4	(Croatia) Dinamo Zagreb	6	1	2	3	10	13	−3	5		1–4	4–0	3–3	—

Source: UEFA
Rules for classification: Group stage tiebreakers

18 September 2019 1	Dinamo Zagreb (Croatia)	4–0	(Italy) Atalanta	Zagreb, Croatia
21:00 CEST (UTC+02:00)	Leovac 10'; Oršić 31', 42', 68'; Théophile-Catherine (yellow card) 39'; Moro (yellow card) 66'	Report	Djimsiti (yellow card) 18'; De Roon (yellow card) 27'; Gosens (yellow card) 79'	Stadium: Stadion Maksimir; Attendance: 28,863; Referee: Jesús Gil Manzano (Spain)

1 October 2019 2	Atalanta (Italy)	1–2	(Ukraine) Shakhtar Donetsk	Milan, Italy
18:55 CEST (UTC+02:00)	Zapata 28'; Iličić (yellow card) 44'; De Roon (yellow card) 49'; Tolói (yellow card) 80'; Malinovskyi (yellow card) 90+2'	Report	Kryvtsov (yellow card) 15'; Stepanenko (yellow card) 35'; Moraes 41', (yellow card) 45'; Bolbat (yellow card) 64'; Solomon 90+5'	Stadium: San Siro; Attendance: 26,022; Referee: Tobias Stieler (Germany)

22 October 2019 3	Manchester City (England)	5–1	(Italy) Atalanta	Manchester, England
21:00 CEST (UTC+02:00)	Mendy (yellow card) 4'; Agüero 34', 38' (pen.); Sterling 58', 64', 69'; De Bruyne (yellow card) 63'; Foden (yellow card) 76' (yellow-red card) 83'; Otamendi (yellow card) 90+2'	Report	Masiello (yellow card) 10'; Malinovskyi 28' (pen.)	Stadium: City of Manchester Stadium; Attendance: 49,308; Referee: Orel Grinfeld (Israel)

6 November 2019 4	Atalanta (Italy)	1–1	(England) Manchester City	Milan, Italy
21:00 CET (UTC+01:00)	Djimsiti (yellow card) 27'; Tolói (yellow card) 39'; Iličić (yellow card) 43'; Pašalić 49'; Castagne (yellow card) 79'	Report	Sterling 7'; Fernandinho (yellow card) 70'; Bravo (red card) 81'; Mendy (yellow card) 90+2'; B. Silva (yellow card) 90+6'	Stadium: San Siro; Attendance: 34,326; Referee: Aleksei Kulbakov (Belarus)

26 November 2019 5	Atalanta (Italy)	2–0	(Croatia) Dinamo Zagreb	Milan, Italy
21:00 CET (UTC+01:00)	Muriel 27' (pen.); Tolói (yellow card) 41'; Gómez 47'; Pašalić (yellow card) 65'	Report	Théophile-Catherine (yellow card) 13'; Perić (yellow card) 19'; Stojanović (yellow card) 74'	Stadium: San Siro; Attendance: 28,365; Referee: Sergei Karasev (Russia)

11 December 2019 6	Shakhtar Donetsk (Ukraine)	0–3	(Italy) Atalanta	Kharkiv, Ukraine
18:55 CET (UTC+01:00)	Patrick (yellow card) 50'; Dodô (yellow card) 63', (red card) 77'	Report	Muriel (yellow card) 23'; Castagne 66'; Freuler (yellow card) 75'; Pašalić 80'; Hateboer (yellow card) 90+1'; Gosens 90+4'	Stadium: Metalist Stadium; Attendance: 26,536; Referee: Felix Zwayer (Germany)

==== Knockout phase ====
===== Round of 16 =====
19 February 2020 First leg	Atalanta (Italy)	4–1	(Spain) Valencia	Milan, Italy
21:00 CET (UTC+01:00)	Hateboer 16', 62', (yellow card) 79'; Iličić 42'; Freuler 57'	Report	Cheryshev 66'	Stadium: San Siro; Attendance: 44,236; Referee: Michael Oliver (England)

10 March 2020 Second leg	Valencia (Spain)	3–4 (4–8 agg.)	(Italy) Atalanta	Valencia, Spain
21:00 CET (UTC+01:00)	Gameiro 21', 51'; Coquelin (yellow card) 33'; Diakhaby (yellow card) 42'; Kondogbia (yellow card) 58'; Wass (yellow card) 64'; Torres 67'	Report	Iličić 3' (pen.), 43' (pen.), 71', 82'; Freuler (yellow card) 86'	Stadium: Mestalla; Attendance: 0 Referee: Ovidiu Hațegan (Romania)
Note: Match was played behind closed doors due to concerns over the COVID-19 pandemic in Europe.

===== Quarter-finals =====
12 August 2020 Quarter-finals	Atalanta (Italy)	1–2	(France) Paris Saint-Germain	Lisbon, Portugal
21:00 CEST (UTC+02:00)	Pašalić 27'; Djimsiti (yellow card) 37'; Freuler (yellow card) 45+1'; De Roon (yellow card) 50'; Zapata (yellow card) 53'; Tolói (yellow card) 67'; Palomino (yellow card) 85'	Report	Bernat (yellow card) 55'; Herrera (yellow card) 57'; Paredes (yellow card) 75'; Marquinhos 90'; Choupo-Moting 90+3'	Stadium: Estádio da Luz; Attendance: 0 Referee: Anthony Taylor (England)
Note: Match was played behind closed doors due to concerns over the COVID-19 pandemic in Europe.

== Statistics ==
=== Appearances and goals ===
No.	Pos	Nat	Player	Total		Serie A		Coppa Italia		Champions League	
No.	Pos	Nat	Player	Apps	Goals	Apps	Goals	Apps	Goals	Apps	Goals
Goalkeepers
31	GK	(Italy) ITA	Franceso Rossi	1	0	0+1	0	0	0	0	0
57	GK	(Italy) ITA	Marco Sportiello	8	0	5+1	0	0	0	2	0
95	GK	(Italy) ITA	Pierluigi Gollini	41	0	33	0	1	0	7	0
Defenders
2	DF	(Brazil) BRA	Rafael Tolói	40	2	29+4	2	0	0	7	0
3	DF	(Italy) ITA	Mattia Caldara	18	0	11+3	0	1	0	3	0
4	DF	(Croatia) CRO	Boško Šutalo	7	0	3+4	0	0	0	0	0
6	DF	(Argentina) ARG	José Luis Palomino	38	2	28+2	2	0+1	0	6+1	0
7	DF	(Germany) GER	Lennart Czyborra	1	0	0+1	0	0	0	0	0
8	DF	(Germany) GER	Robin Gosens	43	10	31+3	9	1	0	7+1	1
19	DF	(Albania) ALB	Berat Djimsiti	41	2	32+2	2	1	0	6	0
21	DF	(Belgium) BEL	Timothy Castagne	33	2	19+8	1	0	0	4+2	1
22	DF	(Italy) ITA	Raoul Bellanova	1	0	0+1	0	0	0	0	0
33	DF	(Netherlands) NED	Hans Hateboer	42	2	25+7	0	1	0	7+2	2
Midfielders
5	MF	(France) FRA	Adrien Tameze	9	0	2+5	0	0	0	0+2	0
11	MF	(Switzerland) SUI	Remo Freuler	40	3	28+3	2	1	0	8	1
15	MF	(Netherlands) NED	Marten de Roon	45	2	29+6	2	1	0	9	0
18	MF	(Ukraine) UKR	Ruslan Malinovskyi	44	9	12+22	8	1	0	1+8	1
20	MF	(Italy) ITA	Jacopo Da Riva	2	0	0+1	0	0	0	0+1	0
72	MF	(Slovenia) SLO	Josip Iličić	34	21	21+5	15	0+1	1	6+1	5
88	MF	(Croatia) CRO	Mario Pašalić	45	12	30+5	9	1	0	7+2	3
Forwards
9	FW	(Colombia) COL	Luis Muriel	41	19	10+24	18	1	0	2+4	1
10	FW	(Argentina) ARG	Alejandro Gómez	46	8	34+2	7	0+1	0	9	1
17	FW	(Italy) ITA	Roberto Piccoli	1	0	0+1	0	0	0	0	0
79	FW	(Ivory Coast) CIV	Amad	3	1	0+3	1	0	0	0	0
90	FW	(The Gambia) GAM	Ebrima Colley	5	0	0+5	0	0	0	0	0
91	FW	(Colombia) COL	Duván Zapata	33	19	25+3	18	0	0	3+2	1
Players transferred out during the season
4	DF	(Denmark) DEN	Simon Kjær	6	0	3+2	0	0	0	1	0
5	DF	(Italy) ITA	Andrea Masiello	12	0	7	0	1	0	4	0
7	DF	(Poland) POL	Arkadiusz Reca	0	0	0	0	0	0	0	0
13	DF	(Brazil) BRA	Guilherme Arana	4	0	0+4	0	0	0	0	0
41	DF	(Brazil) BRA	Roger Ibañez	1	0	0	0	0	0	0+1	0
99	FW	(The Gambia) GAM	Musa Barrow	8	0	1+6	0	0	0	0+1	0

Last updated: 12 August 2020
Source: Competitions

=== Goalscorers ===
Rank	No.	Pos	Nat	Name	Serie A	Coppa Italia	UEFA CL	Total
1	72	MF	(Slovenia)	Josip Iličić	15	1	5	21
2	9	FW	(Colombia)	Luis Muriel	18	0	1	19
2	91	FW	(Colombia)	Duván Zapata	18	0	1	19
4	88	MF	(Croatia)	Mario Pašalić	9	0	3	12
5	8	DF	(Germany)	Robin Gosens	9	0	1	10
6	18	MF	(Ukraine)	Ruslan Malinovskyi	8	0	1	9
7	10	FW	(Argentina)	Alejandro Gómez	7	0	1	8
8	11	MF	(Switzerland)	Remo Freuler	2	0	1	3
9	2	DF	(Brazil)	Rafael Tolói	2	0	0	2
9	6	DF	(Argentina)	José Luis Palomino	2	0	0	2
9	15	MF	(Netherlands)	Marten de Roon	2	0	0	2
9	19	DF	(Albania)	Berat Djimsiti	2	0	0	2
9	21	DF	(Belgium)	Timothy Castagne	1	0	1	2
9	33	DF	(Netherlands)	Hans Hateboer	0	0	2	2
15	79	FW	(Ivory Coast)	Amad	1	0	0	1
Own goal					2	0	0	2
Totals					98	1	17	116

Last updated: 12 August 2020

=== Clean sheets ===
Rank	No.	Pos	Nat	Name	Serie A	Coppa Italia	UEFA CL	Total
1	95	GK	(Italy)	Pierluigi Gollini	5	0	2	7
2	57	GK	(Italy)	Marco Sportiello	1	0	0	1
Totals					6	0	2	8

Last updated: 1 March 2020

=== Disciplinary record ===
No.	Pos	Nat	Name	Serie A			Coppa Italia			UEFA CL			Total		
No.	Pos	Nat	Name	Yellow card	(yellow card) (yellow-red card)	Red card	Yellow card	(yellow card) (yellow-red card)	Red card	Yellow card	(yellow card) (yellow-red card)	Red card	Yellow card	(yellow card) (yellow-red card)	Red card
31	GK	(Italy)	Francesco Rossi	0	0	0	0	0	0	0	0	0	0	0	0
95	GK	(Italy)	Pierluigi Gollini	3	0	0	0	0	0	0	0	0	3	0	0
2	DF	(Brazil)	Rafael Tolói	5	0	0	0	0	0	3	0	0	8	0	0
3	DF	(Italy)	Mattia Caldara	0	0	0	1	0	0	0	0	0	1	0	0
4	DF	(Denmark)	Simon Kjær	2	0	0	0	0	0	0	0	0	2	0	0
5	DF	(Italy)	Andrea Masiello	1	0	0	0	0	0	1	0	0	2	0	0
6	DF	(Argentina)	José Luis Palomino	4	0	0	0	0	0	0	0	0	4	0	0
7	DF	(Germany)	Lennart Czyborra	0	0	0	0	0	0	0	0	0	0	0	0
8	DF	(Germany)	Robin Gosens	2	0	0	0	0	0	1	0	0	3	0	0
19	DF	(Albania)	Berat Djimsiti	2	0	0	1	0	0	2	0	0	5	0	0
21	DF	(Belgium)	Timothy Castagne	3	0	0	0	0	0	1	0	0	4	0	0
33	DF	(Netherlands)	Hans Hateboer	7	0	0	0	0	0	2	0	0	9	0	0
11	MF	(Switzerland)	Remo Freuler	2	0	0	0	0	0	1	0	0	3	0	0
15	MF	(Netherlands)	Marten de Roon	10	0	0	0	0	0	2	0	0	12	0	0
18	MF	(Ukraine)	Ruslan Malinovskyi	4	1	0	0	0	0	1	0	0	5	1	0
72	MF	(Slovenia)	Josip Iličić	1	0	1	0	0	0	2	0	0	3	0	1
88	MF	(Croatia)	Mario Pašalić	4	0	0	0	0	0	1	0	0	5	0	0
9	FW	(Colombia)	Luis Muriel	0	0	0	0	0	0	1	0	0	1	0	0
10	FW	(Argentina)	Alejandro Gómez	2	0	0	0	0	0	0	0	0	2	0	0
91	FW	(Colombia)	Duván Zapata	1	0	0	0	0	0	0	0	0	1	0	0
99	FW	(The Gambia)	Musa Barrow	0	0	0	0	0	0	0	0	0	0	0	0
Totals				53	1	1	2	0	0	18	0	0	73	1	1

Last updated: 1 March 2020
