= 2019 Coppa Italia final =

71st Coppa Italia final
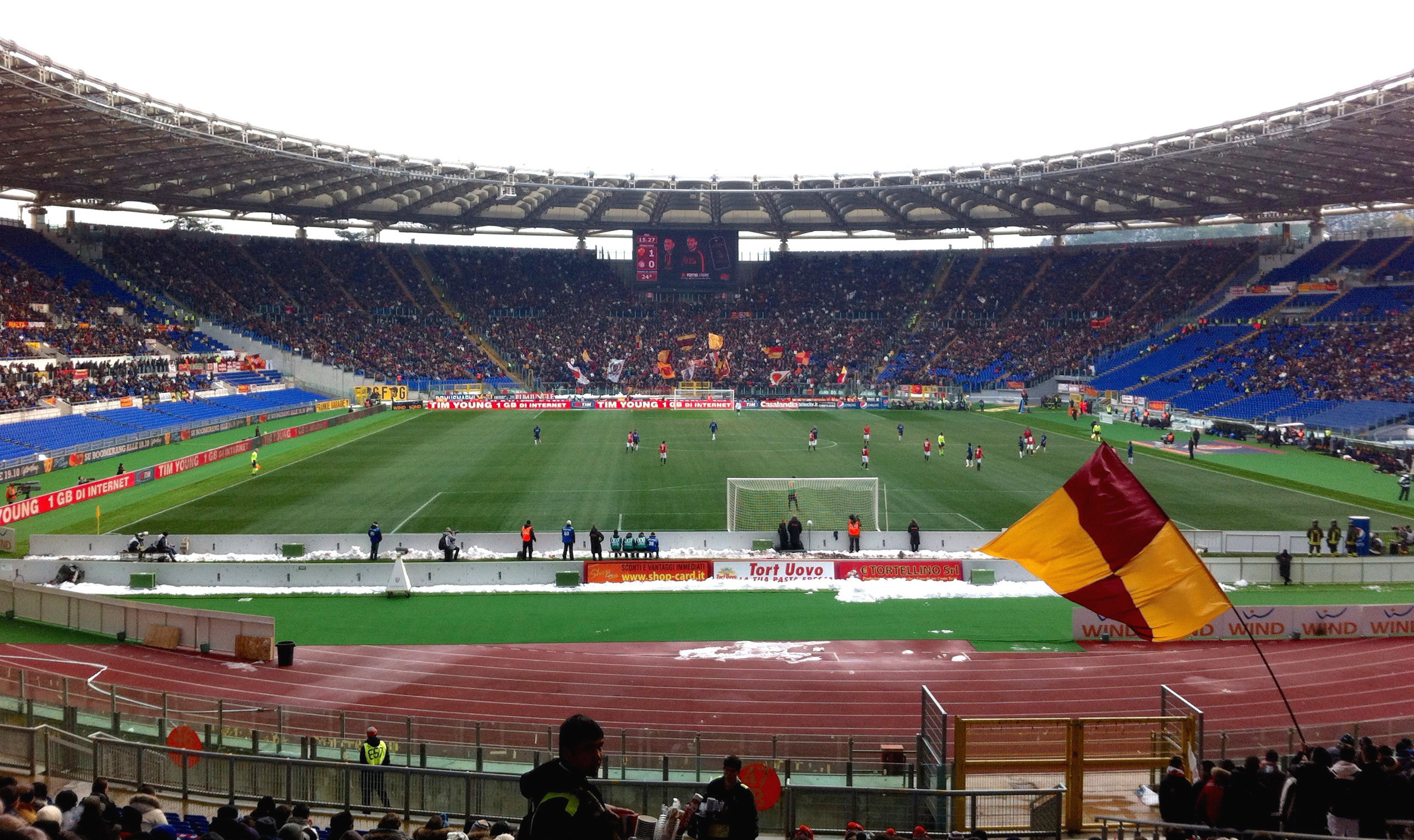
- The Stadio Olimpico in Rome hosted the final
- Event: 2018–19 Coppa Italia
Atalanta	Lazio
0	2
- Date: 15 May 2019
- Venue: Stadio Olimpico, Rome
- Referee: Luca Banti
- Attendance: 57,059

The 2019 Coppa Italia final decided the winner of the 2018–19 Coppa Italia, Italy's main football cup.

It was played on 15 May 2019 at the Stadio Olimpico in Rome between Atalanta and Lazio. This was the first-ever meeting between these two clubs in the final. Lazio won the match 2–0, winning their seventh title overall, from 10 finals appearances. Atalanta made its fourth finals appearance, and have now lost three consecutive finals after winning their only title in 1963.

As the cup winners, Lazio automatically qualified to the group stage of the 2019–20 UEFA Europa League and to the 2019 Supercoppa Italiana against Juventus.

== Road to the final ==
Note: In all results below, the score of the finalist is given first (H: home; A: away).

Atalanta		Round	Lazio
Opponent	Result	2018–19 Coppa Italia	Opponent	Result
Cagliari (A)	2–0	Round of 16	Novara (H)	4–1
Juventus (H)	3–0	Quarter-finals	Internazionale (A)	1–1 (4–3 p)
Fiorentina	3–3 (A), 2–1 (H) (5–4 agg.)	Semi-finals	Milan	0–0 (H), 1–0 (A) (1–0 agg.)

== Pre-match ==
=== Ticketing ===
Tickets were available for sale only to Italian fans (for security reasons) from 29 April 2019 in three price categories: €35, €50, and €130.

== Match ==
=== Details ===
15 May 2019
20:45 CEST (UTC+2)

Atalanta	0–2	Lazio
	Report	Milinković-Savić 82'; Correa 90'

Stadio Olimpico, Rome
Attendance: 57,059
Referee: Luca Banti

Atalanta	Lazio

GK	95	(Italy) Pierluigi Gollini
CB	5	(Italy) Andrea Masiello	(yellow card) 37'
CB	6	(Argentina) José Luis Palomino
CB	19	(Albania) Berat Djimsiti
RM	33	(Netherlands) Hans Hateboer
CM	15	(Netherlands) Marten de Roon		(substituted off) 85'
CM	11	(Switzerland) Remo Freuler	(yellow card) 81'
LM	21	(Belgium) Timothy Castagne		(substituted off) 84'
AM	10	(Argentina) Alejandro Gómez (c)
CF	72	(Slovenia) Josip Iličić
CF	91	(Colombia) Duván Zapata	(yellow card) 41'	(substituted off) 84'
Substitutes:
GK	1	(Albania) Etrit Berisha
GK	31	(Italy) Francesco Rossi
DF	7	(Poland) Arkadiusz Reca
DF	8	(Germany) Robin Gosens		(substituted on) 84'
DF	23	(Italy) Gianluca Mancini
DF	41	(Brazil) Roger Ibañez
DF	78	(Italy) Enrico Del Prato
MF	22	(Italy) Matteo Pessina
MF	70	(Italy) Andrea Colpani
MF	88	(Croatia) Mario Pašalić		(substituted on) 85'
FW	17	(Italy) Roberto Piccoli
FW	99	(The Gambia) Musa Barrow		(substituted on) 84'
Manager:
(Italy) Gian Piero Gasperini

GK	1	(Albania) Thomas Strakosha
CB	3	(Brazil) Luiz Felipe
CB	33	(Italy) Francesco Acerbi
CB	15	(Angola) Bastos	(yellow card) 24'	(substituted off) 36'
RM	77	(Montenegro) Adam Marušić	(yellow card) 87'
CM	16	(Italy) Marco Parolo
CM	6	(Brazil) Lucas Leiva	(yellow card) 57'
CM	10	(Spain) Luis Alberto		(substituted off) 78'
LM	19	(Bosnia and Herzegovina) Senad Lulić (c)	(yellow card) 39'
CF	17	(Italy) Ciro Immobile		(substituted off) 66'
CF	11	(Argentina) Joaquín Correa
Substitutes:
GK	23	(Italy) Guido Guerrieri
GK	24	(Belgium) Silvio Proto
DF	4	(Spain) Patric
DF	13	(Brazil) Wallace
DF	14	(Denmark) Riza Durmisi
DF	26	(Romania) Ștefan Radu		(substituted on) 36'
MF	21	(Serbia) Sergej Milinković-Savić		(substituted on) 78'
MF	25	(Croatia) Milan Badelj
MF	27	(Italy) Rômulo
MF	32	(Italy) Danilo Cataldi
FW	20	(Ecuador) Felipe Caicedo		(substituted on) 66'
FW	30	(Portugal) Pedro Neto
Manager:
(Italy) Simone Inzaghi

Assistant referees:
Gianluca Vuoto
Lorenzo Manganelli
Fourth official:
Fabio Maresca
Reserve assistant referee:
Alfonso Marrazzo
Video assistant referee:
Gianpaolo Calvarese
Assistant video assistant referees:
Giorgio Peretti

Match rules

- 90 minutes.
- 30 minutes of extra time if necessary.
- Penalty shoot-out if scores still level.
- Twelve named substitutes.
- Maximum of three substitutions, with a fourth allowed in extra time.

== See also ==
- 2018–19 Atalanta BC season
- 2018–19 SS Lazio season
