= Duván Zapata =

Colombian footballer (born 1991)

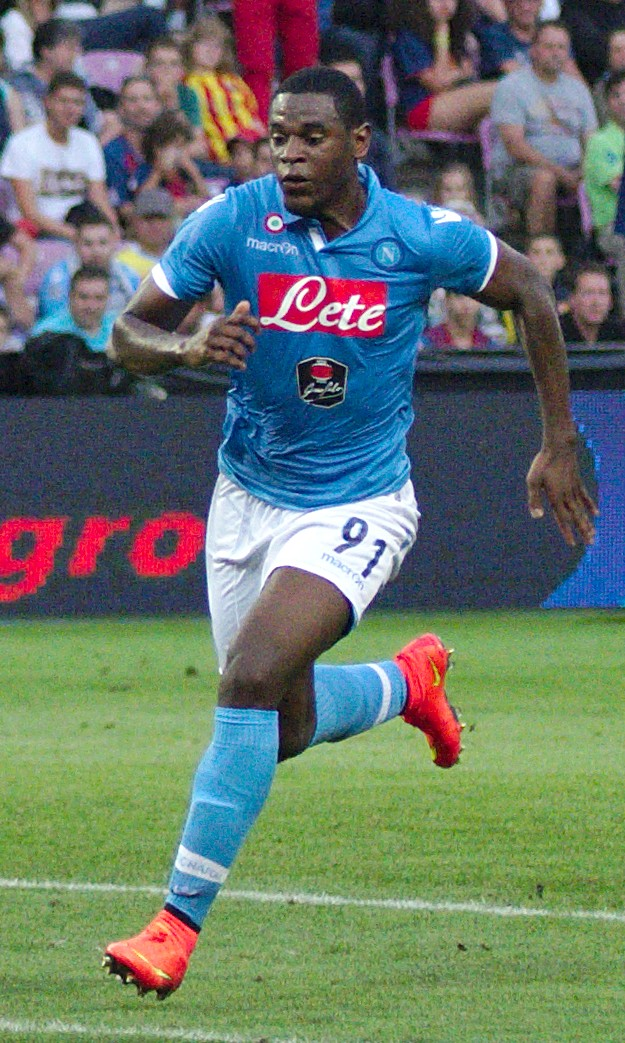
- Zapata playing for Napoli in 2014

Personal information
- Full name: Duván Esteban Zapata Banguero
- Date of birth: 1 April 1991 (age 35)
- Place of birth: Cali, Colombia
- Height: 1.88 m (6 ft 2 in)
- Position: Striker

Team information
- Current team: Torino
- Number: 91

Youth career
- 2004–2008: América de Cali

Senior career*
Years	Team	Apps	(Gls)
2008–2011	América de Cali	52	(8)
2011–2013	Estudiantes	44	(19)
2013–2018	Napoli	37	(11)
2015–2017	→ Udinese (loan)	63	(18)
2017–2018	→ Sampdoria (loan)	31	(11)
2018–2020	Sampdoria	0	(0)
2018–2020	→ Atalanta (loan)	46	(29)
2020–2024	Atalanta	107	(40)
2023–2024	→ Torino (loan)	35	(12)
2024–	Torino	35	(6)

International career
2011	Colombia U20	5	(1)
2017–2021	Colombia	34	(4)
Medal record
Representing Colombia
Men's football
Copa América
Third place	2021 Brazil
- * Club domestic league appearances and goals as of 23:03, 24 May 2026 (UTC)

Duván Esteban Zapata Banguero (Latin American Spanish: [duˈβan saˈpata]; born 1 April 1991) is a Colombian professional footballer who plays as a striker for and captains Serie A club Torino.

After starting his career with Colombian club América de Cali, Zapata would go on to play for Estudiantes in Argentina. From 2013, he played in Italy's Serie A, for Napoli, Udinese, Sampdoria, Atalanta and Torino. Zapata became well known during his time at Atalanta, where he would form a striker partnership with compatriot Luis Muriel.

Having previously played for Colombia's U20 team, At international level, Zapata made his senior debut for Colombia in 2017, and took part at the Copa América in 2019 and 2021.

== Club career ==
=== America de Cali ===
Zapata joined América de Cali's youth academy aged 13 in 2004, and made his debut with the first team on 18 May 2008, during a 3–2 loss against Boyaca Chico, where he also scored a goal. In July 2008, Zapata started in both legs of the finals against Boyaca Chico, who later beat America on penalties to win the league title. In December 2008, America de Cali won the league title by beating Independiente Medellín in the finals, but Zapata didn't participate in either match.

On 13 February 2011, he scored a hat-trick, the first of his career, in a 3–2 home victory against Deportivo Pereira at Estadio Pascual Guerrero. At the end of the 2011 Apertura, Zapata left the club.

=== Estudiantes ===
On 27 July 2011, Zapata joined Estudiantes on loan for a $120,000 loan fee with an purchase option for $1.2 million. On his debut, Zapata scored a goal in a 3–2 win over Belgrano. During his first year with Estudiantes, Zapata would occasionally make appearances with their reserve team. Despite this, he still managed to score four goals in eight matches in the Torneo Clausura 2012. That year, within both the Apertura and Clasura, Zapata scored 5 goals in 11 matches. During the summer of 2012, Estudiantes purchased half of Zapata's playing rights from América de Cali.

For the 2012–13 season, Zapata featured in Estudiantes' starting 11, eventually turning into a fundamental part of the team and attracting interest from many European clubs like Beşiktaş, after scoring 16 goals in 33 games.

In July 2013, Premier League club West Ham United applied for a British work permit for Zapata ahead of a possible transfer from Estudiantes. Although not meeting the usual requirements for a permit, West Ham attempted to secure his arrival by claiming he was a "special talent" who would enhance the English game. However, West Ham's owners soon announced on social media they were withdrawing from the deal, even after agreeing a £6.7 million fee with Estudiantes.

=== Napoli ===
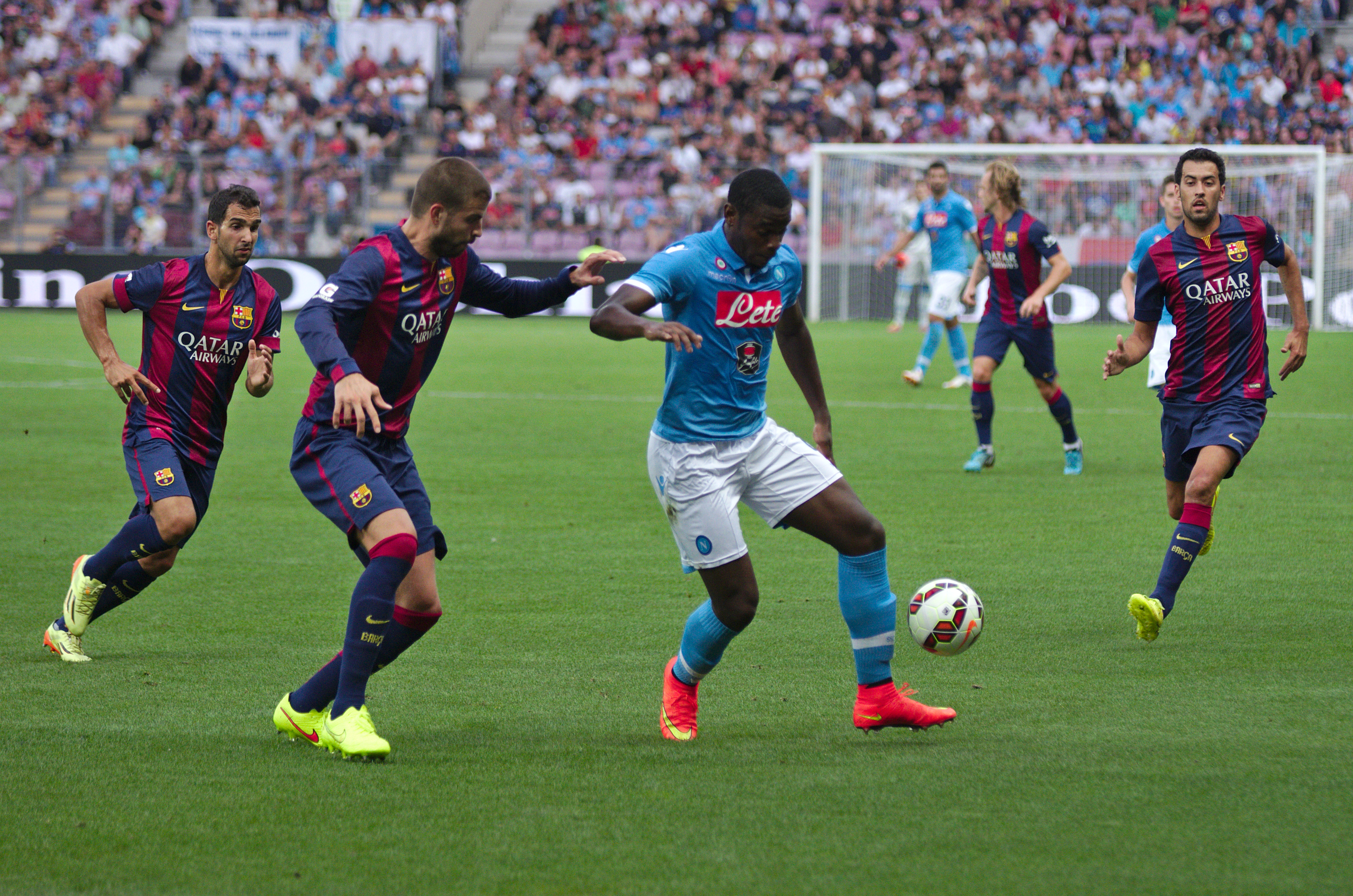
Zapata (middle) on the ball against Barcelona in August 2014

On 25 August 2013, Zapata transferred to Serie A club Napoli for an undisclosed fee. He made his first start in Serie A on 28 September, in a 2–0 Napoli win against Genoa. On 22 October, he scored his first goal in the UEFA Champions League, against Marseille in a 2–1 away win.

Zapata scored his first league goals for the Partenopei on 26 March 2014, two in a 4–2 win at Catania in which his team got all their goals in the first half. He finished the season with five to his name, including two more in the last match, a 5–1 win over Hellas Verona at the Stadio San Paolo.

On 22 July 2015, Zapata joined Udinese on a two-year loan deal with the option to purchase him after his first year at the club. On 31 August 2017, Zapata joined Sampdoria on a season-long loan deal with an obligation to purchase.

=== Atalanta ===
On 12 July 2018, Zapata joined Italian club Atalanta on a two-season loan deal with an option to purchase. On 26 December 2018, Zapata scored twice in a 2–2 draw against Juventus. Later on 20 January 2019, Zapata scored four goals in a 5–0 away win versus Frosinone, becoming the first Atalanta player since Hasse Jeppson in 1952 to achieve this feat in Serie A. The goals lifted his tally up to 14 goals, all scored consecutively in his last 8 matches, making him the top scorer of the league jointly with Cristiano Ronaldo and Fabio Quagliarella. On 30 January 2019, Zapata scored twice in a 3–0 win against holders Juventus in the quarter-final stage of Coppa Italia. After helping Atalanta to reach the 2019 Coppa Italia Final, and achieve a third-place finish in Serie A, and consequently a spot in the Champions League, scoring 23 league goals in the process, Zapata was awarded a spot in the Serie A team of the year at the end of the season. On 1 October 2019, Zapata scored Atalanta's first ever goal in the UEFA Champions League in a 2–1 loss against Shakhtar Donetsk. On 17 January 2020, Atalanta exercised their option to purchase Zapata's rights on a permanent basis. A week later, he scored his first goal since his return from a three-month injury in a 7–0 rout of Torino. On 11 July, Zapata scored his 15th goal of the season in a 2–2 draw against Juventus, making it the first time since Juventus in 1952 that a Serie A club had three players with 15 or more goals in a season (Muriel, Iličić, Zapata).

On 27 October 2020, he scored a brace in a 2–2 draw against Ajax in the 2020–21 UEFA Champions League. Zapata became Atalanta's joint-highest non-Italian goalscorer in Serie A on 15 May 2021, alongside Germán Denis, scoring his 56th league goal for the club against Genoa.

=== Torino ===
On 1 September 2023, Zapata joined Torino on a season-long loan, with an option to buy and a conditional €7 million obligation to buy. In July 2024, he joined the club permanently and was named as their new club captain. On 6 October 2024, he sustained an ACL injury during an away match against Inter Milan which would sideline him for the rest of the 2024–25 season. On 8 December 2025, he scored his first goal after return to action in a 3–2 defeat against Milan.

== International career ==
Zapata received his first call-up to the Colombia national team for 2018 FIFA World Cup qualifying matches against Bolivia and Ecuador in March 2017. He made his debut on 23 March, as a 64th-minute substitute for Mateus Uribe in a 1–0 home win over Bolivia.

In May 2018, Zapata was named in Colombia's preliminary 35-man squad for the 2018 World Cup tournament proper, in Russia. However, he did not make the final 23-man squad.

On 30 May 2019, Zapata was included in the 23-man final Colombia squad for the 2019 Copa América. In a pre-tournament friendly on 9 June he scored his first international goal at the end of a 3–0 win away to Peru, having replaced Radamel Falcao at half time. He then scored in the first two group games in Brazil, against Argentina (2–0) and Qatar (1–0).

In June 2021, he was included in Colombia's squad for the 2021 Copa América in Brazil. He successfully converted Colombia's first penalty kick in the quarter-final shoot-out against Uruguay. Colombia would eventually eliminate Uruguay 4–2 on penalties following a 0–0 draw. Ultimately, Colombia achieved a third-place finish with Zapata failing to score despite appearing in a total of 7 matches.

== Style of play and reception ==
Zapata is primarily known for his speed, offensive movement, physicality, and goalscoring ability as a striker. He usually plays in a central role, and possesses a powerful and accurate shot. He is also known for his ability in the air, courtesy of his height, strength, and powerful physique, which also aids him in defending the ball with his back to goal, and enables him to hold up possession and bring his teammates into the game with his link-up play; he is also adept in one on one situations due to his technique and agility. Moreover, he is known for his defensive work-rate and willingness to press opponents off the ball.

In October 2024, former Juventus and Italy defender Leonardo Bonucci named Zapata as the toughest opponent he had ever played against.

== Personal life ==
Zapata is the cousin of fellow professional footballer and former Colombia international defender Cristián Zapata. Cristián Zapata was included in Colombia's squads for the 2014 and 2018 editions of the FIFA World Cup, and was also featured in various Copa América tournaments.

== Career statistics ==
=== Club ===
As of match played 24 May 2026

Appearances and goals by club, season and competition
Club	Season	League			National cup (Note: Includes Copa Colombia, Copa Argentina, Coppa Italia)		Continental		Total	
Club	Season	Division	Apps	Goals	Apps	Goals	Apps	Goals	Apps	Goals
América de Cali	2008	Categoría Primera A	14	1	0	0	0	0	14	1
América de Cali	2009	Categoría Primera A	6	0	0	0	0	0	6	0
América de Cali	2010	Categoría Primera A	19	2	0	0	–		19	2
América de Cali	2011	Categoría Primera A	13	5	2	1	–		15	6
América de Cali	Total		52	8	2	1	0	0	54	9
Estudiantes	2011–12	Argentine Primera División	11	5	0	0	–		11	5
Estudiantes	2012–13	Argentine Primera División	31	13	2	3	–		33	16
Estudiantes	2013–14	Argentine Primera División	2	1	0	0	–		2	1
Estudiantes	Total		44	19	2	3	0	0	46	22
Napoli	2013–14	Serie A	16	5	1	0	5 (Note: Three appearances and one goal in UEFA Champions League, two appearances and one goal in UEFA Europa League)	2	22	7
Napoli	2014–15	Serie A	21	6	1	0	9 (Note: One appearance in UEFA Champions League, eight appearances and two goals in UEFA Europa League)	2	31	8
Napoli	Total		37	11	2	0	14	4	53	15
Udinese (loan)	2015–16	Serie A	25	8	1	0	–		26	8
Udinese (loan)	2016–17	Serie A	38	10	1	1	–		39	11
Udinese (loan)	Total		63	18	2	1	0	0	65	19
Sampdoria (loan)	2017–18	Serie A	31	11	1	0	–		32	11
Atalanta (loan)	2018–19	Serie A	37	23	5	3	6 (Note: Appearances in UEFA Europa League)	2	48	28
Atalanta	2019–20	Serie A	28	18	0	0	5 (Note: Appearances in UEFA Champions League)	1	33	19
Atalanta	2020–21	Serie A	37	15	4	1	8	3	49	19
Atalanta	2021–22	Serie A	24	10	0	0	8 (Note: Six appearances and three goals in UEFA Champions League, two appearances in UEFA Europa League)	3	32	13
Atalanta	2022–23	Serie A	25	2	2	0	–		27	2
Atalanta	2023–24	Serie A	2	1	–		–		2	1
Atalanta	Atalanta total		153	69	11	4	27	9	191	82
Torino (loan)	2023–24	Serie A	35	12	1	0	–		36	12
Torino	2024–25	Serie A	7	3	2	1	–		9	4
Torino	2025–26	Serie A	28	3	2	0	–		30	3
Torino	Torino total		70	18	5	1	0	0	75	19
Career total			450	154	25	10	41	13	516	177

=== International ===
As of match played 16 November 2021

Appearances and goals by national team and year
National team	Year	Apps	Goals
Colombia	2017	4	0
Colombia	2018	1	0
Colombia	2019	11	3
Colombia	2020	4	1
Colombia	2021	14	0
Total		34	4

Scores and results list Colombia's goal tally first, score column indicates score after each Zapata goal.

List of international goals scored by Duván Zapata
No.	Date	Venue	Opponent	Score	Result	Competition
1	9 June 2019	Estadio Monumental, Lima, Peru	Peru	3–0	3–0	Friendly
2	15 June 2019	Itaipava Arena Fonte Nova, Salvador, Brazil	Argentina	2–0	2–0	2019 Copa América
3	19 June 2019	Estádio do Morumbi, São Paulo, Brazil	Qatar	1–0	1–0	2019 Copa América
4	9 October 2020	Estadio Metropolitano Roberto Meléndez, Barranquilla, Colombia	Venezuela	1–0	3–0	2022 FIFA World Cup qualification

== Honours ==
América de Cali

- Categoría Primera A: 2008–II

Napoli

- Coppa Italia: 2013–14
- Supercoppa Italiana: 2014

Colombia U20

- Toulon Tournament: 2011

Individual

- Serie A Team of the Year: 2018–19
