= 2018–19 Atalanta BC season =

Atalanta
2018–19 season
- President: Antonio Percassi
- Manager: Gian Piero Gasperini
- Stadium: Stadio Atleti Azzurri d'Italia
- Serie A: 3rd
- Coppa Italia: Runners-up
- UEFA Europa League: Play-off round
- Top goalscorer: League: Duván Zapata (23); All: Duván Zapata (28)
- Highest home attendance: 20,801 vs Milan (16 February 2019, Serie A)
- Lowest home attendance: 6,546 vs Hapoel Haifa (16 August 2018, Europa League)
- Average home league attendance: 18,903
Home colours	Away colours	Third colours

The 2018–19 season was Atalanta Bergamasca Calcio's eighth consecutive season in Serie A. The club competed in Serie A and the Coppa Italia, and had qualified for the second qualifying round of the UEFA Europa League following their seventh-place finish the previous season.

The season was coach Gian Piero Gasperini's third at the club.

== Players ==
=== Squad information ===
Last updated on 26 May 2019
Appearances include league matches only

No.	Player	Nat.	Position(s)	Date of birth (Age at end of season)	Signed from	Signed in	Contract ends	Apps.	Goals
Goalkeepers
1	Etrit Berisha	(Albania)	GK	10 March 1989 (aged 30)	(Italy) Lazio	2017	2021	75	0
31	Francesco Rossi	(Italy)	GK	27 April 1991 (aged 28)	(Italy) Youth Sector	2009	2018	2	0
95	Pierluigi Gollini	(Italy)	GK	18 March 1995 (aged 24)	(England) Aston Villa	2017	2018	31	0
Defenders
2	Rafael Toloi	(Brazil)	CB	10 October 1990 (aged 28)	(Brazil) São Paulo	2015	2020	108	3
5	Andrea Masiello	(Italy)	CB / RB	5 February 1986 (aged 33)	(Italy) Bari	2011	2018	150	8
6	José Luis Palomino	(Argentina)	CB	5 January 1990 (aged 29)	(Bulgaria) Ludogorets Razgrad	2017	2020	56	2
7	Arkadiusz Reca	(Poland)	LB	17 June 1995 (aged 24)	(Poland) Wisła Płock	2018	2022	3	0
8	Robin Gosens	(Germany)	LB / LWB / LM	5 July 1994 (aged 24)	(Netherlands) Heracles Almelo	2017	2020	49	4
19	Berat Djimsiti	(Albania)	CB / RB / LB	19 February 1993 (aged 26)	(Switzerland) Zürich	2016	2019	27	1
21	Timothy Castagne	(Belgium)	RB	5 December 1995 (aged 23)	(Belgium) Genk	2017	2020	48	4
23	Gianluca Mancini	(Italy)	CB	17 April 1996 (aged 23)	(Italy) Perugia	2017	2020	41	6
30	Marco Varnier	(Italy)	CB	8 June 1998 (aged 21)	(Italy) Cittadella	2018	2024	0	0
33	Hans Hateboer	(Netherlands)	RB	9 January 1994 (aged 25)	(Netherlands) Groningen	2017	2020	74	5
41	Roger Ibañez	(Brazil)	CB	23 November 1998 (aged 20)	(Brazil) Fluminense	2019		1	0
Midfielders
11	Remo Freuler	(Switzerland)	CM	15 April 1992 (aged 27)	(Switzerland) Luzern	2016	2023	109	13
15	Marten de Roon	(Netherlands)	CM	29 March 1991 (aged 28)	(England) Middlesbrough	2017	2022	69	5
22	Matteo Pessina	(Italy)	CM / AM / DM	21 April 1997 (aged 22)	(Italy) Milan	2017	2022	12	0
44	Dejan Kulusevski	(Sweden)	CM / RM / LM	25 April 2000 (aged 19)	(Italy) Youth Sector	2017	2022	3	0
72	Josip Iličić	(Slovenia)	AM / RW / SS	29 January 1988 (aged 31)	(Italy) Fiorentina	2017	2020	62	23
88	Mario Pašalić	(Croatia)	CM / DM / AM	9 February 1995 (aged 24)	(England) Chelsea	2018	2019	33	5
Forwards
10	Alejandro Gómez	(Argentina)	LW / SS	15 February 1988 (aged 31)	(Ukraine) Metalist Kharkiv	2014	2022	163	39
17	Roberto Piccoli	(Italy)	CF	27 January 2001 (aged 18)	(Italy) Youth Sector			2	0
91	Duván Zapata	(Colombia)	CF	1 April 1991 (aged 28)	(Italy) Sampdoria	2018	2020	37	23
99	Musa Barrow	(The Gambia)	CF / LW	14 November 1998 (aged 20)	(Italy) Youth Sector	2017	2020	34	4
Players transferred during the season
4	Luca Valzania	(Italy)	CM / DM / AM	5 March 1996 (aged 23)	(Italy) Frosinone	2015	2023	4	0
9	Andreas Cornelius	(Denmark)	ST / CF	16 March 1993 (aged 26)	(Denmark) Copenhagen	2017	2020	23	3
13	Davide Bettella	(Italy)	CB	7 April 2000 (aged 19)	(Italy) Internazionale	2018		0	0
17	Marco D'Alessandro	(Italy)	RW / LW / RM	17 February 1991 (aged 28)	(Italy) Roma	2014	2019	71	4
20	Marco Tumminello	(Italy)	CF / SS	6 November 1998 (aged 20)	(Italy) Roma	2018	2019	2	0
24	Emiliano Rigoni	(Argentina)	RW / LW	4 February 1993 (aged 26)	(Russia) Zenit Saint Petersburg	2018	2019	12	3
53	Ali Adnan Kadhim	(Iraq)	LB	19 December 1993 (aged 25)	(Italy) Udinese	2018	2019	3	0

== Transfers ==
=== In ===
Date	Pos.	Player	Age	Moving from	Fee	Notes	Source
9 June 2018	GK	(Italy) Pierluigi Gollini	23	(England) Aston Villa	€4.3M	Option to buy activated	
9 June 2018	DF	(Poland) Arkadiusz Reca	22	(Poland) Wisła Płock	Undisclosed		
29 June 2018	DF	(Italy) Davide Bettella	18	(Italy) Internazionale	€7M	Buy-back option included	
30 June 2018	MF	(Italy) Marco Carraro	20	(Italy) Internazionale	Undisclosed	Buy-back option included	
1 July 2018	MF	(Italy) Federico Mattiello	22	(Italy) SPAL	Loan return		

==== Loans in ====
Date	Pos.	Player	Age	Moving from	Fee	Notes	Source
22 June 2018	FW	(Italy) Marco Tumminello	19	(Italy) Roma	€6M	Buy-back options for the next two summers for €10M and €13M respectively	
2 July 2018	DF	(Italy) Marco Varnier	20	(Italy) Cittadella	Loan	Loan with compulsory purchase option	
12 July 2018	FW	(Colombia) Duván Zapata	27	(Italy) Sampdoria	€14M	2-year loan with €12M option to buy	
25 July 2018	MF	(Croatia) Mario Pašalić	23	(England) Chelsea	Loan	Loan with an option to buy	
17 August 2018	DF	(Iraq) Ali Adnan Kadhim	24	(Italy) Udinese	Loan	Loan with an option to buy	
17 August 2018	MF	(Argentina) Emiliano Rigoni	25	(Russia) Zenit Saint Petersburg	€1M	€1M loan with an option to buy for €15M	

=== Out ===
Date	Pos.	Player	Age	Moving to	Fee	Notes	Source
1 July 2018	DF	(Italy) Alessandro Bastoni	19	(Italy) Internazionale	Free	Loan return	
1 July 2018	DF	(Italy) Mattia Caldara	24	(Italy) Juventus	Free	Loan return	
1 July 2018	MF	(Italy) Luca Rizzo	26	(Italy) Bologna	Free	Loan return	
1 July 2018	DF	(Italy) Leonardo Spinazzola	25	(Italy) Juventus	Free	Loan return	
14 January 2019	MF	(Argentina) Emiliano Rigoni	25	(Russia) Zenit Saint Petersburg	Free	Loan return	

==== Loans out ====
Date	Pos.	Player	Age	Moving to	Fee	Notes	Source
8 June 2018	MF	(Italy) Bryan Cristante	23	(Italy) Roma	€5M	One-year loan with a compulsory option to buy for €15M + €10M in bonuses	
6 July 2018	GK	(Italy) Marco Sportiello	26	(Italy) Frosinone	Loan	Loan with an option to buy	
19 July 2018	FW	(Italy) Andrea Petagna	23	(Italy) SPAL	Loan	Loan with an obligation to buy under unspecified conditions	
20 July 2018	MF	(Italy) Federico Mattiello	23	(Italy) Bologna	Loan	Loan with an obligation to buy	
17 August 2018	MF	(Italy) Marco D'Alessandro	27	(Italy) Udinese	Loan	Loan with an option to buy	
31 August 2018	FW	(Denmark) Andreas Cornelius	25	(France) Bordeaux	Loan	One-year loan with an option to buy for €7M to €8M	
8 January 2019	MF	(Italy) Luca Valzania	21	(Italy) Frosinone	Loan	Season-long loan deal	

== Competitions ==
=== Serie A ===
==== League table ====
Pos	Team	Pld	W	D	L	GF	GA	GD	Pts	Qualification or relegation
1	Juventus (C)	38	28	6	4	70	30	+40	90	Qualification for the Champions League group stage
2	Napoli	38	24	7	7	74	36	+38	79	Qualification for the Champions League group stage
3	Atalanta	38	20	9	9	77	46	+31	69 (Note: Atalanta finished ahead of Internazionale on head-to-head points: Atalanta 4–1 Internazionale, Internazionale 0–0 Atalanta.)	Qualification for the Champions League group stage
4	Inter Milan	38	20	9	9	57	33	+24	69	Qualification for the Champions League group stage
5	Milan (Note: Milan were excluded from UEFA competitions over financial fair play violation.)	38	19	11	8	55	36	+19	68	

Source: Serie A, Soccerway
Rules for classification: 1) Points; 2) Head-to-head points; 3) Head-to-head goal difference; 4) Goal difference; 5) Goals scored; 6) Draw. (Note: Head-to-head record is used only after all the matches between the teams in question have been played).
(C) Champions

==== Results summary ====
Overall								Home						Away					
Pld	W	D	L	GF	GA	GD	Pts	W	D	L	GF	GA	GD	W	D	L	GF	GA	GD
38	20	9	9	77	46	+31	69	10	5	4	36	19	+17	10	4	5	41	27	+14

Last updated: 26 May 2019.
Source: Competitive matches

==== Results by round ====
Round	1	2	3	4	5	6	7	8	9	10	11	12	13	14	15	16	17	18	19	20	21	22	23	24	25	26	27	28	29	30	31	32	33	34	35	36	37	38
Ground	H	A	H	A	A	H	A	H	A	H	A	H	A	H	A	H	A	H	A	A	H	A	H	H	A	H	A	H	A	H	A	H	A	H	A	H	A	H
Result	W	D	L	L	D	D	L	L	W	W	W	W	L	L	W	W	L	D	W	W	D	W	W	L	L	W	W	D	W	W	D	D	W	W	W	W	D	W
Position	1	4	6	13	13	14	16	17	15	14	10	8	9	11	7	6	9	9	8	7	7	5	5	6	6	6	5	6	5	5	5	6	5	4	4	4	3	3

Updated to match(es) played on 26 May 2019. Source: Competitive matches
A = Away; H = Home; W = Win; D = Draw; L = Loss

==== Matches ====
20 August 2018 1	Atalanta	4–0	Frosinone	Bergamo
20:30 CEST (UTC+02:00)	Gómez 14', 90+2'; Hateboer 48'; Pašalić 61'	Report	Perica (yellow card) 31'; Goldaniga (yellow card) 88'	Stadium: Stadio Atleti Azzurri d'Italia; Attendance: 18,217; Referee: Marco Piccinini

27 August 2018 2	Roma	3–3	Atalanta	Rome
20:30 CEST (UTC+02:00)	Pastore 2'; Nzonzi (yellow card) 58'; Florenzi 60'; Manolas 82'	Report	Castagne 19'; Rigoni 22', 38'; Djimsiti (yellow card) 81'	Stadium: Stadio Olimpico; Attendance: 41,725; Referee: Michael Fabbri

2 September 2018 3	Atalanta	0–1	Cagliari	Bergamo
20:30 CEST (UTC+02:00)	Djimsiti (yellow card) 44'; De Roon (yellow card) 47'	Report	Barella 45'; Ioniță (yellow card) 52'; Dessena (yellow card) 82'	Stadium: Stadio Atleti Azzurri d'Italia; Attendance: 17,709; Referee: Fabio Maresca

17 September 2018 4	SPAL	2–0	Atalanta	Ferrara
20:30 CEST (UTC+02:00)	Petagna (yellow card) 40', (goal) 50', 56'; Felipe (yellow card) 60'; Everton Luiz (yellow card) 90+4'	Report	Freuler (yellow card) 6'; Rigoni (yellow card) 36'; Gosens (yellow card) 49'; De Roon (yellow card) 64'; Iličić (yellow card) 90+4'	Stadium: Stadio Paolo Mazza; Attendance: 14,153; Referee: Maurizio Mariani

23 September 2018 5	Milan	2–2	Atalanta	Milan
18:00 CEST (UTC+02:00)	Higuaín 2', (yellow card) 65'; Calabria (yellow card) 51'; Bonaventura 61'	Report	Gómez 54', (yellow card) 78'; Rigoni 90+1'	Stadium: San Siro; Attendance: 51,684; Referee: Daniele Doveri

26 September 2018 6	Atalanta	0–0	Torino	Bergamo
20:30 CEST (UTC+02:00)	Palomino (yellow card) 48'; Tumminello (yellow card) 88'	Report	Meïté (yellow card) 31'	Stadium: Stadio Atleti Azzurri d'Italia; Attendance: 18,144; Referee: Daniele Orsato

30 September 2018 7	Fiorentina	2–0	Atalanta	Florence
15:00 CEST (UTC+02:00)	Vitor Hugo (yellow card) 52'; Veretout 63' (pen.); Lafont (yellow card) 90'; Fernandes (yellow card) 90+2'; Biraghi 90+4'	Report	Palomino (yellow card) 54'; Toloi (yellow card) 61'; Gómez (yellow card) 86'	Stadium: Stadio Artemio Franchi; Attendance: 30,535; Referee: Paolo Valeri

7 October 2018 8	Atalanta	0–1	Sampdoria	Bergamo
15:00 CEST (UTC+02:00)	De Roon (yellow card) 46'; Iličić (yellow card) 89'	Report	Andersen (yellow card) 31'; Praet (yellow card) 50'; Tonelli 76'; Linetty (yellow card) 78'; Bereszyński (yellow card) 90+1'	Stadium: Stadio Atleti Azzurri d'Italia; Attendance: 19,164; Referee: Massimiliano Irrati

21 October 2018 9	Chievo	1–5	Atalanta	Verona
15:00 CEST (UTC+02:00)	Barba (yellow card) 3' (yellow-red card) 40'; Birsa 84' (pen.); Bani (yellow card) 86'	Report	De Roon 25'; Iličić 28', 50', 52'; Gosens 72'; Mancini (yellow card) 77'	Stadium: Stadio Marc'Antonio Bentegodi; Attendance: 11,100; Referee: Gianluca Rocchi

27 October 2018 10	Atalanta	3–0	Parma	Bergamo
15:00 CEST (UTC+02:00)	Gagliolo 55' (o.g.); Palomino 72'; Mancini 80'	Report	Barillà (yellow card) 23'; Gagliolo (yellow card) 61'	Stadium: Stadio Atleti Azzurri d'Italia; Attendance: 18,152; Referee: Rosario Abisso

4 November 2018 11	Bologna	1–2	Atalanta	Bologna
18:00 CET (UTC+01:00)	Mbaye 3'; Helander (yellow card) 47'	Report	Iličić (yellow card) 24'; Gómez (yellow card) 41'; Mancini 57'; Zapata 70'	Stadium: Stadio Renato Dall'Ara; Attendance: 19,038; Referee: Federico La Penna

11 November 2018 12	Atalanta	4–1	Internazionale	Bergamo
12:30 CET (UTC+01:00)	Hateboer 9', (yellow card) 69'; Mancini 62'; De Roon (yellow card) 78'; Gómez (yellow card) 79', (goal) 90+4'; Djimsiti 88'	Report	Vecino (yellow card) 25'; Brozović (yellow card) 35' (yellow-red card) 90+2'; Škriniar (yellow card) 41'; Icardi 47' (pen.); Gagliardini (yellow card) 76'	Stadium: Stadio Atleti Azzurri d'Italia; Attendance: 20,633; Referee: Fabio Maresca

25 November 2018 13	Empoli	3–2	Atalanta	Empoli
15:00 CET (UTC+01:00)	Veseli (yellow card) 24'; La Gumina 42'; Maietta (yellow card) 67'; Masiello 77' (o.g.); Silvestre 90+2'	Report	Freuler 33'; Masiello (yellow card) 38'; Hateboer 40'; Gosens (yellow card) 69'; Iličić (yellow card) 84' (red card) 84'	Stadium: Stadio Carlo Castellani; Attendance: 8,736; Referee: Gianluca Manganiello

3 December 2018 14	Atalanta	1–2	Napoli	Bergamo
20:30 CET (UTC+01:00)	Zapata 56'; Masiello (yellow card) 61'	Report	Fabián 2'; Allan (yellow card) 14'; Mário Rui (yellow card) 79'; Milik 85'	Stadium: Stadio Atleti Azzurri d'Italia; Attendance: 19,871; Referee: Piero Giacomelli

9 December 2018 15	Udinese	1–3	Atalanta	Udine
15:00 CET (UTC+01:00)	Lasagna 12'; Stryger Larsen (yellow card) 45+1'	Report	Zapata 2', 62', 80'; Masiello (yellow card) 76'	Stadium: Dacia Arena; Attendance: 24,413; Referee: Gianpaolo Calvarese

17 December 2018 16	Atalanta	1–0	Lazio	Bergamo
20:30 CET (UTC+01:00)	Zapata 1', (yellow card) 50'; Djimsiti (yellow card) 88'	Report	Parolo (yellow card) 38'; Wallace (yellow card) 62'; Lukaku (yellow card) 87'; Acerbi (yellow card) 90+3'	Stadium: Stadio Atleti Azzurri d'Italia; Attendance: 17,401; Referee: Daniele Orsato

22 December 2018 17	Genoa	3–1	Atalanta	Genoa
15:00 CET (UTC+01:00)	Romero (yellow card) 4'; Toloi 45+6' (o.g.); Criscito (yellow card) 55'; Lazović 67'; Rolón (yellow card) 71'; Piątek 88'	Report	Palomino (yellow card) 12' (yellow-red card) 81'; Zapata 55' (pen.); Toloi (red card) 90+3'	Stadium: Stadio Luigi Ferraris; Attendance: 19,841; Referee: Daniele Doveri

26 December 2018 18	Atalanta	2–2	Juventus	Bergamo
15:00 CET (UTC+01:00)	Zapata 24', 56', (yellow card) 29'; Mancini (yellow card) 32'; Hateboer (yellow card) 60'; Freuler (yellow card) 90'	Report	Djimsiti 2' (o.g.); Bentancur (yellow card) 18' (yellow-red card) 53'; Chiellini (yellow card) 38'; Mandžukić (yellow card) 62'; Ronaldo 78'	Stadium: Stadio Atleti Azzurri d'Italia; Attendance: 19,787; Referee: Luca Banti

29 December 2018 19	Sassuolo	2–6	Atalanta	Reggio Emilia
15:00 CET (UTC+01:00)	Duncan 51', 58'; Sensi (yellow card) 70'	Report	Castagne (yellow card) 16'; Zapata 19', (yellow card) 81'; Gómez 42'; Mancini 54'; Iličić 74', 87', 90+2'	Stadium: Mapei Stadium – Città del Tricolore; Attendance: 12,233; Referee: Fabrizio Pasqua

20 January 2019 20	Frosinone	0–5	Atalanta	Frosinone
12:30 CET (UTC+01:00)	Ghiglione (yellow card) 88'; Matarese (yellow card) 90+1'	Report	Mancini 11'; Zapata 44', 47', 64', 73'	Stadium: Stadio Benito Stirpe; Attendance: 12,728; Referee: Daniele Chiffi

27 January 2019 21	Atalanta	3–3	Roma	Bergamo
15:00 CET (UTC+01:00)	Castagne 45'; Toloi 59'; Zapata 71'	Report	Džeko 3', 33'; Cristante (yellow card) 23'; Manolas (yellow card) 35'; El Shaarawy 40'; Nzonzi (yellow card) 64'	Stadium: Stadio Atleti Azzurri d'Italia; Attendance: 19,459; Referee: Gianpaolo Calvarese

4 February 2019 22	Cagliari	0–1	Atalanta	Cagliari
21:00 CET (UTC+01:00)		Report	Hateboer 50'; Pašalić (yellow card) 86'; Berisha (yellow card) 90+4'	Stadium: Sardegna Arena; Attendance: 14,821; Referee: Paolo Valeri

10 February 2019 23	Atalanta	2–1	SPAL	Bergamo
15:00 CET (UTC+01:00)	Hateboer (yellow card) 13'; Iličić 57'; Zapata 79'	Report	Missiroli (yellow card) 4'; Petagna 8'; Valoti (yellow card) 12'; Paloschi (yellow card) 29'	Stadium: Stadio Atleti Azzurri d'Italia; Attendance: 18,342; Referee: Davide Massa

16 February 2019 24	Atalanta	1–3	Milan	Bergamo
20:30 CET (UTC+01:00)	De Roon (yellow card) 18'; Freuler 33'	Report	Suso (yellow card) 27'; Piątek 45+1', 61'; Çalhanoğlu 55'; Rodríguez (yellow card) 89'	Stadium: Stadio Atleti Azzurri d'Italia; Attendance: 20,801; Referee: Fabrizio Pasqua

23 February 2019 25	Torino	2–0	Atalanta	Turin
15:00 CET (UTC+01:00)	Izzo 42'; Falque 46'; Nkoulou (yellow card) 78'; Berenguer (yellow card) 90+4'	Report	Castagne (yellow card) 7'	Stadium: Stadio Olimpico Grande Torino; Attendance: 21,062; Referee: Daniele Orsato

3 March 2019 26	Atalanta	3–1	Fiorentina	Bergamo
18:00 CET (UTC+01:00)	Iličić 28'; Gómez 34'; Masiello (yellow card) 35'; Freuler (yellow card) 42'; Gosens 59'; De Roon (yellow card) 69'; Palomino (yellow card) 86'	Report	Muriel 3'; Ceccherini (yellow card) 6'; Veretout (yellow card) 81'	Stadium: Stadio Atleti Azzurri d'Italia; Attendance: 18,796; Referee: Marco Guida

10 March 2019 27	Sampdoria	1–2	Atalanta	Genoa
15:00 CET (UTC+01:00)	Murru (yellow card) 53'; Quagliarella 67' (pen.); Ramírez (yellow card) 90+3'	Report	Zapata 50', (yellow card) 90+5'; Gosens 77'; Freuler (yellow card) 90+6'	Stadium: Stadio Luigi Ferraris; Attendance: 20,896; Referee: Michael Fabbri

17 March 2019 28	Atalanta	1–1	Chievo	Bergamo
15:00 CET (UTC+01:00)	De Roon (yellow card) 28'; Iličić 55'	Report	Meggiorini (yellow card) 5', (goal) 32'; Dioussé (yellow card) 35'; Hetemaj (yellow card) 45+1'; Cesar (yellow card) 63'; Depaoli (yellow card) 74'; Andreolli (yellow card) 74'; Giaccherini (yellow card) 90+6'	Stadium: Stadio Atleti Azzurri d'Italia; Attendance: 18,537; Referee: Massimiliano Irrati

31 March 2019 29	Parma	1–3	Atalanta	Parma
12:30 CEST (UTC+02:00)	Gervinho 8'; Scozzarella (yellow card) 76'	Report	Pašalić 24'; Castagne (yellow card) 58'; Zapata 75', 90+4'	Stadium: Stadio Ennio Tardini; Attendance: 18,168; Referee: Daniele Chiffi

4 April 2019 30	Atalanta	4–1	Bologna	Bergamo
21:00 CEST (UTC+02:00)	Iličić 3', 5'; Hateboer 9', (yellow card) 87'; Zapata 15', (yellow card) 60'	Report	González (yellow card) 51'; Orsolini 54'; Calabresi (yellow card) 86'; Valencia (yellow card) 87'	Stadium: Stadio Atleti Azzurri d'Italia; Attendance: 18,441; Referee: Gianluca Rocchi

7 April 2019 31	Internazionale	0–0	Atalanta	Milan
18:00 CEST (UTC+02:00)	Politano (yellow card) 73'	Report	Gollini (yellow card) 2'; Mancini (yellow card) 63'	Stadium: San Siro; Attendance: 60,860; Referee: Massimiliano Irrati

15 April 2019 32	Atalanta	0–0	Empoli	Bergamo
20:30 CEST (UTC+02:00)	Palomino (yellow card) 19'	Report	Dell'Orco (yellow card) 29'; Bennacer (yellow card) 45+2'; Veseli (yellow card) 61'	Stadium: Stadio Atleti Azzurri d'Italia; Attendance: 19,229; Referee: Gianluca Manganiello

22 April 2019 33	Napoli	1–2	Atalanta	Naples
19:00 CEST (UTC+02:00)	Mertens 28'; Hysaj (yellow card) 29'; Koulibaly (yellow card) 71'; Fabián (yellow card) 82'	Report	Mancini (yellow card) 1'; Zapata 69'; Pašalić 80'	Stadium: Stadio San Paolo; Attendance: 19,604; Referee: Daniele Orsato

29 April 2019 34	Atalanta	2–0	Udinese	Bergamo
19:00 CEST (UTC+02:00)	De Roon 82' (pen.); Pašalić 85'	Report	Zeegelaar (yellow card) 55'; Samir (yellow card) 63'	Stadium: Stadio Atleti Azzurri d'Italia; Attendance: 18,663; Referee: Piero Giacomelli

5 May 2019 35	Lazio	1–3	Atalanta	Rome
15:00 CEST (UTC+02:00)	Parolo 3'; Bastos (yellow card) 26'; Caicedo (yellow card) 41'; Lucas (yellow card) 60'; Correa (yellow card) 87'	Report	Zapata 22'; Masiello (yellow card) 36'; Gómez (yellow card) 54'; Castagne 58'; Wallace 76' (o.g.); Mancini (yellow card) 83'	Stadium: Stadio Olimpico; Attendance: 32,984; Referee: Gianpaolo Calvarese

11 May 2019 36	Atalanta	2–1	Genoa	Reggio Emilia
15:00 CEST (UTC+02:00)	Palomino (yellow card) 34'; Barrow 46'; Castagne 53'	Report	Veloso (yellow card) 7'; Pandev (yellow card) 59', (goal) 89'; Romero (yellow card) 84'	Stadium: Mapei Stadium; Attendance: 12,000; Referee: Massimiliano Irrati

19 May 2019 37	Juventus	1–1	Atalanta	Turin
20:30 CEST (UTC+02:00)	Alex Sandro (yellow card) 14'; Ronaldo (yellow card) 45+3'; Matuidi (yellow card) 70'; Mandžukić 80'; Bernardeschi (red card) 90+2'	Report	Hateboer (yellow card) 28'; Iličić 33'	Stadium: Allianz Stadium; Attendance: 39,531; Referee: Gianluca Rocchi

26 May 2019 38	Atalanta	3–1	Sassuolo	Reggio Emilia
20:30 CEST (UTC+02:00)	Zapata 35'; Iličić (yellow card) 38'; De Roon (yellow card) 45+5'; Gómez 53'; Pašalić 65'	Report	Berardi 19', (red card) 45+5'; Rogério (yellow card) 45+4'; Magnanelli (yellow card) 45+5' (yellow-red card) 83'; Ferrari (yellow card) 48'	Stadium: Mapei Stadium – Città del Tricolore; Attendance: 14,376; Referee: Daniele Doveri

=== Coppa Italia ===
14 January 2019 Round of 16	Cagliari	0–2	Atalanta	Cagliari
17:30 CET (UTC+01:00)	Cigarini (yellow card) 21'; Faragò (yellow card) 57'	Report	Freuler (yellow card) 45+2'; Toloi (yellow card) 75'; Djimsiti (yellow card) 81'; Zapata 88'; Pašalić 90+3'	Stadium: Sardegna Arena; Attendance: 10,119; Referee: Marco Piccinini

30 January 2019 Quarter-finals	Atalanta	3–0	Juventus	Bergamo
20:45 CET (UTC+01:00)	Castagne 37'; Zapata 39', 86'; Djimsiti (yellow card) 43'; Freuler (yellow card) 45+1'; Hateboer (yellow card) 54'	Report	Pjanić (yellow card) 79'; Matuidi (yellow card) 88'	Stadium: Stadio Atleti Azzurri d'Italia; Attendance: 18,438; Referee: Fabrizio Pasqua

27 February 2019 Semi-finals; First leg	Fiorentina	3–3	Atalanta	Florence
21:00 CET (UTC+01:00)	Vitor Hugo (yellow card) 27'; Chiesa 33'; Benassi 36'; Muriel 79'; Biraghi (yellow card) 81'; Laurini (yellow card) 90+4'	Report	Gómez 16'; Pašalić 18'; Mancini (yellow card) 35'; Toloi (yellow card) 40'; Hateboer (yellow card) 45+2'; De Roon 58'	Stadium: Stadio Artemio Franchi; Attendance: 34,437; Referee: Piero Giacomelli

25 April 2019 Semi-finals; Second leg	Atalanta	2–1 (5–4 agg.)	Fiorentina	Bergamo
20:45 CEST (UTC+02:00)	Iličić 14' (pen.); Gómez 69'; Gosens (yellow card) 74'	Report	Muriel 3'; Ceccherini (yellow card) 16'; Pezzella (yellow card) 72'; Mirallas (yellow card) 80'	Stadium: Stadio Atleti Azzurri d'Italia; Attendance: 20,416; Referee: Gianpaolo Calvarese

15 May 2019 Final	Atalanta	0–2	Lazio	Rome
20:45 CEST (UTC+02:00)	Masiello (yellow card) 37'; Zapata (yellow card) 41'; Freuler (yellow card) 81'	Report	Bastos (yellow card) 24'; Lulić (yellow card) 39'; Lucas (yellow card) 57'; Milinković-Savić 82'; Marušić (yellow card) 87'; Correa 90'	Stadium: Stadio Olimpico; Attendance: 57,059; Referee: Luca Banti

=== UEFA Europa League ===
==== Second qualifying round ====
26 July 2018 First leg	Atalanta (Italy)	2–2	(Bosnia and Herzegovina) Sarajevo	Reggio Emilia, Italy
20:30 CEST (UTC+02:00)	Toloi 11'; Mancini 45+3'; De Roon (yellow card) 66'	Report	Rahmanović (yellow card) 16'; Handžić 67'; Šišić 72'; Stanojević (yellow card) 73'; Velkoski (yellow card) 76'	Stadium: Mapei Stadium – Città del Tricolore; Attendance: 7,518; Referee: Tamás Bognár (Hungary)

2 August 2018 Second leg	Sarajevo (Bosnia and Herzegovina)	0–8 (2–10 agg.)	(Italy) Atalanta	Sarajevo, Bosnia and Herzegovina
20:15 CEST (UTC+02:00)	Hebibović (yellow card) 37'; Adukor (yellow card) 44'	Report	Toloi (yellow card) 3'; Palomino 4'; Gómez 15', 28'; Masiello 18'; Ahmetović 39' (o.g.); Barrow 51', 70', 87'	Stadium: Asim Ferhatović Hase Stadium; Attendance: 23,820; Referee: Stuart Attwell (England)

==== Third qualifying round ====
9 August 2018 First leg	Hapoel Haifa (Israel)	1–4	(Italy) Atalanta	Haifa, Israel
18:00 CEST (UTC+02:00)	Buzaglo 7'	Report	Hateboer 18'; Zapata 21'; Palomino (yellow card) 33'; Pašalić 65'; Barrow 86'; Gosens (yellow card) 90+1'	Stadium: Sammy Ofer Stadium; Attendance: 6,412; Referee: Harald Lechner (Austria)

16 August 2018 Second leg	Atalanta (Italy)	2–0 (6–1 agg.)	(Israel) Hapoel Haifa	Reggio Emilia, Italy
20:00 CEST (UTC+02:00)	Zapata 71'; Cornelius 90+2'	Report	Tamaș (yellow card) 79'	Stadium: Mapei Stadium – Città del Tricolore; Attendance: 6,546; Referee: Frank Schneider (France)

==== Play-off round ====
23 August 2018 First leg	Atalanta (Italy)	0–0	(Denmark) Copenhagen	Reggio Emilia, Italy
20:00 CEST (UTC+02:00)	Gosens (yellow card) 58'	Report	Ankersen (yellow card) 51'; N'Doye (yellow card) 54'; Kvist (yellow card) 83'; Joronen (yellow card) 90'	Stadium: Mapei Stadium – Città del Tricolore; Attendance: 7,680; Referee: Pavel Královec (Czech Republic)

30 August 2018 Second leg	Copenhagen (Denmark)	0−0 (a.e.t.) (0−0 agg.) (4−3 p)	(Italy) Atalanta	Copenhagen, Denmark
18:30 CEST (UTC+02:00)	Thomsen (yellow card) 70'; Ankersen (yellow card) 82'; Vavro (yellow card) 115'	Report	Palomino (yellow card) 84'; Pessina (yellow card) 110'	Stadium: Parken Stadium; Attendance: 18,398; Referee: Anastasios Sidiropoulos (Greece)
	Penalties
	Sotiriou (penalty scored); Greguš (penalty scored); Skov (penalty scored); N'Doye (penalty missed); Vavro (penalty scored)		(penalty scored) De Roon; (penalty scored) Ali Adnan; (penalty missed) Gómez; (penalty scored) Masiello; (penalty missed) Cornelius

== Statistics ==
=== Appearances and goals ===
No.	Pos	Nat	Player	Total		Serie A		Coppa Italia		Europa League	
No.	Pos	Nat	Player	Apps	Goals	Apps	Goals	Apps	Goals	Apps	Goals
Goalkeepers
1	GK	(Albania) ALB	Etrit Berisha	22	0	18	0	2	0	2	0
31	GK	(Italy) ITA	Franceso Rossi	1	0	0+1	0	0	0	0	0
95	GK	(Italy) ITA	Pierluigi Gollini	27	0	20	0	3	0	4	0
Defenders
2	DF	(Brazil) BRA	Rafael Toloi	29	2	20+1	1	3	0	5	1
5	DF	(Italy) ITA	Andrea Masiello	32	1	22+2	0	2	0	6	1
6	DF	(Argentina) ARG	José Luis Palomino	39	2	25+5	1	5	0	3+1	1
7	DF	(Poland) POL	Arkadiusz Reca	5	0	0+3	0	0+1	0	1	0
8	DF	(Germany) GER	Robin Gosens	35	3	23+5	3	1+1	0	5	0
19	DF	(Albania) ALB	Berat Djimsiti	29	1	20+4	1	4	0	1	0
21	DF	(Belgium) BEL	Timothy Castagne	37	5	21+7	4	5	1	2+2	0
23	DF	(Italy) ITA	Gianluca Mancini	34	6	24+5	5	1+1	0	3	1
33	DF	(Netherlands) NED	Hans Hateboer	43	6	33+2	5	4	0	4	1
41	DF	(Brazil) BRA	Roger Ibañez	1	0	0+1	0	0	0	0	0
Midfielders
11	MF	(Switzerland) SUI	Remo Freuler	44	2	35	2	4	0	5	0
15	MF	(Netherlands) NED	Marten de Roon	44	3	34+1	2	4	1	5	0
22	MF	(Italy) ITA	Matteo Pessina	19	0	1+11	0	1+1	0	4+1	0
44	MF	(Sweden) SWE	Dejan Kulusevski	3	0	0+3	0	0	0	0	0
72	MF	(Slovenia) SVN	Josip Iličić	36	13	23+8	12	5	1	0	0
88	MF	(Croatia) CRO	Mario Pašalić	41	8	17+16	5	1+3	2	3+1	1
Forwards
10	FW	(Argentina) ARG	Alejandro Gómez	46	11	34+1	7	5	2	6	2
17	FW	(Italy) ITA	Roberto Piccoli	2	0	0+2	0	0	0	0	0
91	FW	(Colombia) COL	Duván Zapata	48	28	32+5	23	5	3	3+3	2
99	FW	(The Gambia) GAM	Musa Barrow	29	5	6+16	1	0+2	0	3+2	4
Players transferred out during the season
4	MF	(Italy) ITA	Luca Valzania	4	0	1+1	0	0	0	0+2	0
9	FW	(Denmark) DEN	Andreas Cornelius	4	1	0	0	0	0	0+4	1
17	MF	(Italy) ITA	Marco D'Alessandro	1	0	0	0	0	0	1	0
20	FW	(Italy) ITA	Marco Tumminello	3	0	0+2	0	0	0	0+1	0
24	MF	(Argentina) ARG	Emiliano Rigoni	12	3	6+6	3	0	0	0	0
53	DF	(Iraq) IRQ	Ali Adnan Kadhim	4	0	2+1	0	0	0	0+1	0

Last updated: 26 May 2019
Source: Competitions

=== Goalscorers ===
Rank	No.	Pos	Nat	Name	Serie A	Coppa Italia	UEFA EL	Total
1	91	FW	(Colombia)	Duván Zapata	23	3	2	28
2	72	MF	(Slovenia)	Josip Iličić	12	1	0	13
3	10	FW	(Argentina)	Alejandro Gómez	7	2	2	11
4	88	MF	(Croatia)	Mario Pašalić	5	2	1	8
5	23	DF	(Italy)	Gianluca Mancini	5	0	1	6
5	33	DF	(Netherlands)	Hans Hateboer	5	0	1	6
7	21	DF	(Belgium)	Timothy Castagne	4	1	0	5
7	99	FW	(The Gambia)	Musa Barrow	1	0	4	5
9	8	DF	(Germany)	Robin Gosens	3	0	0	3
9	15	MF	(Netherlands)	Marten de Roon	2	1	0	3
9	24	MF	(Argentina)	Emiliano Rigoni	3	0	0	3
12	2	DF	(Brazil)	Rafael Toloi	1	0	1	2
12	6	DF	(Argentina)	José Luis Palomino	1	0	1	2
12	11	MF	(Switzerland)	Remo Freuler	2	0	0	2
15	5	DF	(Italy)	Andrea Masiello	0	0	1	1
15	9	FW	(Denmark)	Andreas Cornelius	0	0	1	1
15	19	DF	(Albania)	Berat Djimsiti	1	0	0	1
Own goal					2	0	1	3
Totals					77	10	16	103

Last updated: 26 May 2019

=== Clean sheets ===
Rank	No.	Pos	Nat	Name	Serie A	Coppa Italia	UEFA EL	Total
1	95	GK	(Italy)	Pierluigi Gollini	4	1	3	8
2	1	GK	(Albania)	Etrit Berisha	5	1	1	7
Totals					9	2	4	15

Last updated: 26 May 2019

=== Disciplinary record ===
No.	Pos	Nat	Name	Serie A			Coppa Italia			UEFA EL			Total		
No.	Pos	Nat	Name	Booked	(yellow card) (yellow-red card)	Sent off (straight red)	Booked	(yellow card) (yellow-red card)	Sent off (straight red)	Booked	(yellow card) (yellow-red card)	Sent off (straight red)	Booked	(yellow card) (yellow-red card)	Sent off (straight red)
1	GK	(Albania)	Etrit Berisha	1	0	0	0	0	0	0	0	0	1	0	0
31	GK	(Italy)	Francesco Rossi	0	0	0	0	0	0	0	0	0	0	0	0
95	GK	(Italy)	Pierluigi Gollini	1	0	0	0	0	0	0	0	0	1	0	0
2	DF	(Brazil)	Rafael Toloi	1	0	1	2	0	0	1	0	0	4	0	1
5	DF	(Italy)	Andrea Masiello	5	0	0	0	0	0	0	0	0	5	0	0
6	DF	(Argentina)	José Luis Palomino	4	1	0	0	0	0	2	0	0	6	1	0
7	DF	(Poland)	Arkadiusz Reca	0	0	0	0	0	0	0	0	0	0	0	0
8	DF	(Germany)	Robin Gosens	2	0	0	0	0	0	2	0	0	4	0	0
19	DF	(Albania)	Berat Djimsiti	3	0	0	2	0	0	0	0	0	5	0	0
21	DF	(Belgium)	Timothy Castagne	3	0	0	0	0	0	0	0	0	3	0	0
23	DF	(Italy)	Gianluca Mancini	5	0	0	1	0	0	0	0	0	6	0	0
33	DF	(Netherlands)	Hans Hateboer	5	0	0	2	0	0	0	0	0	7	0	0
53	DF	(Iraq)	Ali Adnan Kadhim	0	0	0	0	0	0	0	0	0	0	0	0
4	MF	(Italy)	Luca Valzania	0	0	0	0	0	0	0	0	0	0	0	0
11	MF	(Switzerland)	Remo Freuler	4	0	0	2	0	0	0	0	0	6	0	0
15	MF	(Netherlands)	Marten de Roon	8	0	0	0	0	0	1	0	0	9	0	0
17	MF	(Italy)	Marco D'Alessandro	0	0	0	0	0	0	0	0	0	0	0	0
22	MF	(Italy)	Matteo Pessina	0	0	0	0	0	0	1	0	0	1	0	0
24	MF	(Argentina)	Emiliano Rigoni	1	0	0	0	0	0	0	0	0	1	0	0
72	MF	(Slovenia)	Josip Iličić	5	0	1	0	0	0	0	0	0	5	0	1
88	MF	(Croatia)	Mario Pašalić	1	0	0	0	0	0	0	0	0	1	0	0
9	FW	(Denmark)	Andreas Cornelius	0	0	0	0	0	0	0	0	0	0	0	0
10	FW	(Argentina)	Alejandro Gómez	5	0	0	0	0	0	0	0	0	5	0	0
20	FW	(Italy)	Marco Tumminello	1	0	0	0	0	0	0	0	0	1	0	0
91	FW	(Colombia)	Duván Zapata	5	0	0	0	0	0	0	0	0	5	0	0
99	FW	(The Gambia)	Musa Barrow	0	0	0	0	0	0	0	0	0	0	0	0
Totals				63	1	1	9	0	0	7	0	0	79	1	1

Last updated: 26 May 2019
