= Hans Hateboer =

Dutch footballer (born 1994)

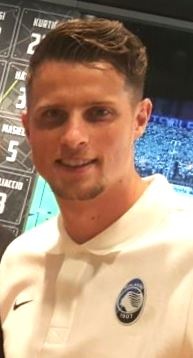
- Hateboer with Atalanta in 2017

Personal information
- Date of birth: 9 January 1994 (age 32)
- Place of birth: Beerta, Netherlands
- Height: 1.87 m (6 ft 2 in)
- Position: Right-back

Team information
- Current team: Groningen
- Number: 33

Youth career
- THOS
- Veendam
- 2011–2013: Groningen

Senior career*
Years	Team	Apps	(Gls)
2013–2017	Groningen	87	(1)
2017–2024	Atalanta	189	(8)
2024–2026	Rennes	27	(0)
2025–2026	→ Lyon (loan)	15	(0)
2026–	Groningen	1	(0)

International career
2014	Netherlands U20	3	(0)
2014–2016	Netherlands U21	8	(2)
2018–2022	Netherlands	13	(0)
Medal record
Men's football
Representing Netherlands
UEFA Nations League
Silver medal – second place	2019 Portugal
- * Club domestic league appearances and goals as of 18 September 2026

Hans Hateboer (born 9 January 1994) is a Dutch professional footballer who plays as a right-back or right wing-back for Eredivisie club Groningen.

A Groningen youth product, Hateboer spent three-and-a-half Eredivisie seasons with the club and won the KNVB Cup, before joining Italian side Atalanta in 2017. In February 2020, he scored Atalanta's first-ever goal in a UEFA Champions League knockout phase match. After seven-and-a-half-seasons with Atalanta, where he won a UEFA Europa League title in his final campaign, Hateboer joined Ligue 1 club Rennes in August 2024.

== Club career ==
=== Groningen ===
He became a product of the Groningen academy, after starting to play football at hometown club THOS and Hateboer made his professional debut on 18 January 2014 in a match against RKC Waalwijk. During the match, which ended in a 1–1 draw, he made an assist and was later sent off. On 19 February 2014, Hateboer signed a three-year contract extension, which entered into force retroactively on 1 February 2014. In the final of the play-offs for European football, he scored a decisive goal against AZ. During the 2013–14 season, he had developed from an amateur player from the youth teams to a starting caliber player in the Groningen team. The following season, 2014–15, Hateboer was part of the team that won its first major trophy, the KNVB Cup which qualified the team for the UEFA Europa League.

In the final year of his deal, Hateboer made it clear that his intention was to leave on a Bosman at the end of the season, which meant that Groningen sold him to Atalanta in the January transfer window rather than lose him for nothing in the summer. When he left Groningen in January 2017 Hateboer had been credited with the most assists for a defender in the Eredivisie that season.

=== Atalanta ===
Having arrived in the middle of an unusually successful season for Atalanta, Hateboer was initially a substitute for Andrea Conti, a starting line-up player in the right wingback position of a 3–4–3 formation. Hateboer made his debut for Atalanta on 19 March 2017, during a 3–0 league win at home over Pescara in which he made an assist. In the 2017–18 season, after Conti transferred to Milan in the summer, he established himself as a regular starter for the team, and also played in the Europa League for the second time in his career. The following season was even more successful season for Hateboer, as he appeared in all matches in the Serie A and scored five goals in the competition. It was also a strong season for Atalanta, as the club finished third in the league and qualified for the UEFA Champions League for the first time in club history.

During the 2019–20 season, Hateboer made his debut in the Champions League in a 4–0 loss to Dinamo Zagreb. On 19 February 2020, he scored his first goal in the competition, which was followed by his second, in a 4–1 win over Valencia in the round of 16. His first goal of the match was also the first goal of Atalanta in the knock-out phase of the Champions League.

In August 2021, Hateboer suffered a foot injury during practice, ruling him out for several months. He made his return to the pitch on 30 November as a starter in Atalanta's 4–0 league win over Venezia.

Hateboer was a late substitute in Atalanta's 3–0 win in the final of the UEFA Europa League against German Bundesliga invincibles Bayer Leverkusen on 22 May 2024.

=== Rennes ===
On 6 August 2024, Ligue 1 club Rennes announced the signing of Hateboer on a two-year contract.

==== Loan to Lyon ====
On 17 October 2025, Hateboer was loaned to Ligue 1 club Lyon on a contract until 30 June 2026. The transfer was completed outside the regular window under France's “joker” transfer exemption. He earned his first start for the club on 2 November, in a Ligue 1 game against Brest, and was sent off after 7 minutes, thus became the fastest player to receive a red card in the club's league history, alongside Thomas Pfannkuch.

=== Return to Groningen ===
On 15 September 2026, Hateboer signed for Groningen on a free transfer following the expiration of his contract with Rennes, returning to the club after nearly ten years.

== International career ==
In March 2018, Hateboer earned his first call-up to the Netherlands national team for friendlies against England and Portugal. It was the first squad chosen by newly-appointed manager Ronald Koeman.

Hateboer made his full international debut starting the international friendly against England on 23 March 2018 at the Amsterdam arena. He then made his first appearance for the Netherlands in almost three years against Poland in a home 1–0 win in the UEFA Nations League on 4 September 2020. He delivered an impressive performance, including an assist for Steven Bergwijn's winning goal.

== Style of play ==
A right-back with a prominent physique and pace, Hateboer has also occasionally been deployed as a centre-back. While in Italy, he gained the nickname cavallo pazzo meaning "mad horse", due to his work rate and stamina.

== Career statistics ==
=== Club ===
As of match played 18 September 2026

Appearances and goals by club, season and competition
Club	Season	League			National cup (Note: Includes KNVB Cup, Coppa Italia, Coupe de France)		Europe		Other		Total	
Club	Season	Division	Apps	Goals	Apps	Goals	Apps	Goals	Apps	Goals	Apps	Goals
Groningen	2013–14	Eredivisie	14	0	0	0	—		4 (Note: Appearances in Eredivisie European play-offs)	1	18	1
Groningen	2014–15	Eredivisie	23	0	5	1	2 (Note: Appearances in UEFA Europa League)	0	—		30	1
Groningen	2015–16	Eredivisie	31	0	2	0	6	0	3 (Note: One appearance in Johan Cruyff Shield, two appearances and one goal in Eredivisie European play-offs)	1	42	1
Groningen	2016–17	Eredivisie	19	1	2	1	—		—		21	2
Groningen	Total		87	1	9	2	8	0	7	2	111	5
Atalanta	2016–17	Serie A	6	0	0	0	—		—		6	0
Atalanta	2017–18	Serie A	33	0	2	0	8	0	—		43	0
Atalanta	2018–19	Serie A	35	5	4	0	4	1	—		43	6
Atalanta	2019–20	Serie A	32	0	1	0	9 (Note: Appearances in UEFA Champions League)	2	—		42	2
Atalanta	2020–21	Serie A	22	2	2	0	6	0	—		30	2
Atalanta	2021–22	Serie A	21	0	2	0	7 (Note: One appearance in UEFA Champions League, six appearances in UEFA Europa League)	0	—		30	0
Atalanta	2022–23	Serie A	17	1	2	1	—		—		19	2
Atalanta	2023–24	Serie A	23	0	2	0	7	0	—		32	0
Atalanta	Total		189	8	15	1	41	2	—		245	12
Rennes	2024–25	Ligue 1	26	0	2	0	—		—		28	0
Rennes	2025–26	Ligue 1	1	0	—		—		—		1	0
Rennes	Total		27	0	2	0	—		—		29	0
Lyon (loan)	2025–26	Ligue 1	15	0	3	0	0	0	—		18	0
Groningen	2026–27	Eredivisie	1	0	0	0	—		—		1	0
Career total			319	9	29	3	49	3	7	2	404	17

=== International ===
Appearances and goals by national team and year
National team	Year	Apps	Goals
Netherlands	2018	3	0
Netherlands	2019	0	0
Netherlands	2020	8	0
Netherlands	2021	0	0
Netherlands	2022	2	0
Total		13	0

== Honours ==
Groningen

- KNVB Cup: 2014–15

Atalanta

- UEFA Europa League: 2023–24
