= 2010–11 Atalanta BC season =

Atalanta
2010–11 season
- President: Antonio Percassi
- Head coach: Stefano Colantuono
- Stadium: Stadio Atleti Azzurri d'Italia
- Serie B: 1st (promoted)
- Coppa Italia: Third round
- Top goalscorer: League: Simone Tiribocchi (14); All: Simone Tiribocchi (14)
- Average home league attendance: 18,737
Home colours	Away colours	Third colours

The 2010–11 season was the 103rd season in the history of Atalanta BC and the club's first season back in the second division of Italian football.

== Players ==
Note: Flags indicate national team as defined under FIFA eligibility rules; some limited exceptions apply. Players may hold more than one non-FIFA nationality.

No.	Pos.	Nation	Player
2	DF	(Argentina) ARG	Leonardo Talamonti
4	DF	(Italy) ITA	Daniele Capelli
5	DF	(Italy) ITA	Thomas Manfredini
6	DF	(Italy) ITA	Gianpaolo Bellini
7	MF	(Italy) ITA	Cristian Raimondi
8	MF	(Paraguay) PAR	Edgar Barreto
13	DF	(Italy) ITA	Federico Peluso
17	FW	(Italy) ITA	Nicola Amoruso
18	FW	(Croatia) CRO	Saša Bjelanović
19	MF	(Switzerland) SUI	Migjen Basha
21	DF	(Italy) ITA	Matteo Gentili
22	MF	(Italy) ITA	Simone Padoin
23	FW	(Italy) ITA	Leonardo Pettinari
24	DF	(Denmark) DEN	Magnus Troest (on loan from Genoa)
26	MF	(Chile) CHI	Carlos Carmona

No.	Pos.	Nation	Player
27	MF	(Italy) ITA	Cristiano Doni (captain)
28	FW	(Italy) ITA	Francesco Ruopolo
32	DF	(Italy) ITA	Michele Ferri
40	MF	(Italy) ITA	Gennaro Delvecchio (on loan from Catania)
47	GK	(Italy) ITA	Andrea Consigli
66	FW	(Italy) ITA	Guido Marilungo
70	FW	(Italy) ITA	Fabio Ceravolo
78	GK	(Italy) ITA	Giorgio Frezzolini
79	MF	(Brazil) BRA	Adriano Ferreira Pinto
81	MF	(Italy) ITA	Samuele Dalla Bona
89	MF	(Italy) ITA	Giacomo Bonaventura
90	FW	(Italy) ITA	Simone Tiribocchi
91	GK	(Italy) ITA	Francesco Rossi
95	MF	(Italy) ITA	Nicola Madonna

=== Out on loan ===
Note: Flags indicate national team as defined under FIFA eligibility rules; some limited exceptions apply. Players may hold more than one non-FIFA nationality.

No.	Pos.	Nation	Player
31	FW	(Italy) ITA	Michele Marconi (at Pergocrema)
34	FW	(Italy) ITA	Marino Defendi (at Grosseto)
63	FW	(Italy) ITA	Matteo Ardemagni (at Padova)
—	GK	(Italy) ITA	Simone Colombi (at Juve Stabia)
—	DF	(Argentina) ARG	Maximiliano Pellegrino (at Cesena)

No.	Pos.	Nation	Player
—	MF	(Italy) ITA	Fabio Caserta (at Cesena)
—	MF	(Italy) ITA	Fabio Meduri (at Rodengo Saiano)
—	MF	(Serbia) SRB	Ivan Radovanović (at Bologna)
—	MF	(Italy) ITA	Ezequiel Schelotto (at Cesena)
—	FW	(Italy) ITA	Christian Tiboni (at CSKA Sofia)

== Pre-season and friendlies ==
Win Draw Loss

31 July 2010 Final	Atalanta (Italy)	1–2	(Spain) Sevilla	Bergamo, Italy
19:00 CEST	Tiribocchi 16'		Luís Fabiano 26' (pen.); Kanouté 69'	Stadium: Atleti Azzurri d'Italia

== Competitions ==
=== Overall record ===
Competition	First match	Last match	Starting round	Final position	Record							
Competition	First match	Last match	Starting round	Final position	Pld	W	D	L	GF	GA	GD	Win %
Serie B	20 August 2010	29 May 2011	Matchday 1	Winners	42	22	13	7	61	35	+26	52.38
Coppa Italia	14 August 2010	27 October 2010	Second round	Third round	2	1	0	1	3	2	+1	50.00
Total					44	23	13	8	64	37	+27	52.27

Source: Competitions

=== Serie B ===
==== League table ====
Pos	Team	Pld	W	D	L	GF	GA	GD	Pts	Promotion or relegation
1	Atalanta (C, P)	42	22	13	7	61	35	+26	79	Promotion to Serie A
2	Siena (P)	42	21	14	7	67	35	+32	77	Promotion to Serie A
3	Novara (O, P)	42	18	16	8	63	38	+25	70	Qualification to promotion play-offs
4	Varese	42	16	20	6	51	34	+17	68	Qualification to promotion play-offs
5	Padova	42	15	17	10	63	48	+15	62	Qualification to promotion play-offs

Source: Lega Serie B
Rules for classification: 1st points, 2nd head-to-head, 3rd goal difference, 4th goals for
(C) Champions; (O) Play-off winners; (P) Promoted

==== Results summary ====
Overall								Home						Away					
Pld	W	D	L	GF	GA	GD	Pts	W	D	L	GF	GA	GD	W	D	L	GF	GA	GD
42	22	13	7	61	36	+25	79	13	6	2	36	13	+23	9	7	5	25	23	+2

==== Results by round ====
Round	1	2	3	4	5	6	7	8	9	10	11	12	13	14	15	16	17	18	19	20	21	22	23	24	25	26	27	28	29	30	31	32	33	34	35	36	37	38	39	40	41	42
Ground	H	A	H	A	A	H	A	H	A	H	A	H	A	H	A	H	H	A	H	A	H	A	H	A	H	H	A	H	A	H	A	H	A	H	A	H	A	A	H	A	H	A
Result	W	D	D	W	L	D	W	W	L	W	L	W	W	W	L	W	L	W	W	W	W	D	D	W	W	D	D	W	W	D	D	W	D	W	W	L	D	L	W	W	D	D
Position	2	3	6	3	4	9	4	3	4	5	6	3	3	2	4	3	3	3	3	2	2	3	3	2	1	2	1	1	1	1	1	1	1	1	1	2	2	2	2	1	1	1

A = Away; H = Home; W = Win; D = Draw; L = Loss

==== Matches ====
20 August 2010 1	Atalanta	2–0	Vicenza	Bergamo
				Stadium: Stadio Atleti Azzurri d'Italia

28 August 2010 2	Varese	0–0	Atalanta	Varese
				Stadium: Stadio Franco Ossola

5 September 2010 3	Atalanta	0–0	Frosinone	Bergamo
				Stadium: Stadio Atleti Azzurri d'Italia

11 September 2010 4	Pescara	0–2	Atalanta	Pescara
				Stadium: Stadio Adriatico

18 September 2010 5	Siena	1–0	Atalanta	Siena
				Stadium: Stadio Artemio Franchi

25 September 2010 6	Atalanta	1–1	Reggina	Bergamo
				Stadium: Stadio Atleti Azzurri d'Italia

2 October 2010 7	Sassuolo	0–2	Atalanta	Modena
				Stadium: Stadio Alberto Braglia

10 October 2010 8	Atalanta	2–1	Torino	Bergamo
				Stadium: Stadio Atleti Azzurri d'Italia

13 October 2010 9	Novara	2–0	Atalanta	Novara
				Stadium: Stadio Silvio Piola

16 October 2010 10	Atalanta	2–1	Ascoli	Bergamo
				Stadium: Stadio Atleti Azzurri d'Italia

23 October 2010 11	Piacenza	3–2	Atalanta	Piacenza
				Stadium: Stadio Leonardo Garilli

30 October 2010 12	Atalanta	4–1	Padova	Bergamo
				Stadium: Stadio Atleti Azzurri d'Italia

5 November 2010 13	Triestina	0–1	Atalanta	Trieste
				Stadium: Stadio Nereo Rocco

9 November 2010 14	Atalanta	1–0	Modena	Bergamo
				Stadium: Stadio Atleti Azzurri d'Italia

13 November 2010 15	Empoli	3–0	Atalanta	Empoli
				Stadium: Stadio Carlo Castellani

20 November 2010 16	Atalanta	2–0	Crotone	Bergamo
				Stadium: Stadio Atleti Azzurri d'Italia

26 November 2010 17	Atalanta	0–2	Livorno	Bergamo
				Stadium: Stadio Atleti Azzurri d'Italia

4 December 2010 18	Portogruaro	1–2	Atalanta	Portogruaro
				Stadium: Stadio Piergiovanni Mecchia

11 December 2010 19	Atalanta	3–1	AlbinoLeffe	Bergamo
				Stadium: Stadio Atleti Azzurri d'Italia

18 December 2010 20	Cittadella	0–1	Atalanta	Cittadella
				Stadium: Stadio Pier Cesare Tombolato

10 January 2011 21	Atalanta	2–0	Grosseto	Bergamo
				Stadium: Stadio Atleti Azzurri d'Italia

15 January 2011 22	Vicenza	1–1	Atalanta	Vicenza
				Stadium: Stadio Romeo Menti

22 January 2011 23	Atalanta	0–0	Varese	Bergamo
				Stadium: Stadio Atleti Azzurri d'Italia

31 January 2011 24	Frosinone	0–1	Atalanta	Frosinone
				Stadium: Stadio Matusa

5 February 2011 25	Atalanta	1–0	Pescara	Bergamo
				Stadium: Stadio Atleti Azzurri d'Italia

11 February 2011 26	Atalanta	0–0	Siena	Bergamo
				Stadium: Stadio Atleti Azzurri d'Italia

19 February 2011 27	Reggina	0–0	Atalanta	Reggio Calabria
				Stadium: Stadio Oreste Granillo

26 February 2011 28	Atalanta	1–0	Sassuolo	Bergamo
				Stadium: Stadio Atleti Azzurri d'Italia

2 March 2011 29	Torino	1–2	Atalanta	Turin
				Stadium: Stadio Olimpico di Torino

7 March 2011 30	Atalanta	1–1	Novara	Bergamo
				Stadium: Stadio Atleti Azzurri d'Italia

12 March 2011 31	Ascoli	1–1	Atalanta	Ascoli Piceno
				Stadium: Stadio Cino e Lillo Del Duca

19 March 2011 32	Atalanta	3–0	Piacenza	Bergamo
				Stadium: Stadio Atleti Azzurri d'Italia

26 March 2011 33	Padova	1–1	Atalanta	Padua
				Stadium: Stadio Euganeo

2 April 2011 34	Atalanta	4–0	Triestina	Bergamo
				Stadium: Stadio Atleti Azzurri d'Italia

11 April 2011 35	Modena	1–2	Atalanta	Modena
				Stadium: Stadio Alberto Braglia

16 April 2011 36	Atalanta	1–2	Empoli	Bergamo
				Stadium: Stadio Atleti Azzurri d'Italia

22 April 2011 37	Crotone	2–2	Atalanta	Crotone
				Stadium: Stadio Ezio Scida

29 April 2011 38	Livorno	2–1	Atalanta	Livorno
				Stadium: Stadio Armando Picchi

7 May 2011 39	Atalanta	4–1	Portogruaro	Bergamo
				Stadium: Stadio Atleti Azzurri d'Italia

16 May 2011 40	AlbinoLeffe	2–3	Atalanta	Bergamo
				Stadium: Stadio Atleti Azzurri d'Italia

21 May 2011 41	Atalanta	2–2	Cittadella	Bergamo
				Stadium: Stadio Atleti Azzurri d'Italia

29 May 2011 42	Grosseto	1–1	Atalanta	Grosseto
				Stadium: Stadio Olimpico Carlo Zecchini

=== Coppa Italia ===
14 August 2010 Second round	Atalanta	3–1	Foligno	Bergamo
20:30 CEST	Padoin 34'; Capelli 65'; Ardemagni 66'	Report	Sciaudone 61'	Stadium: Stadio Atleti Azzurri d'Italia; Referee: Massa

27 October 2010 Third round	Atalanta	0–1	Livorno	Bergamo
18:00 CEST		Report	Cellerino 87'	Stadium: Stadio Atleti Azzurri d'Italia; Referee: De Marco

== Statistics ==
=== Appearances and goals ===
No.	Pos	Nat	Player	Total		Serie A		Coppa Italia	
No.	Pos	Nat	Player	Apps	Goals	Apps	Goals	Apps	Goals
Goalkeepers
1	GK	(Italy) ITA	Andrea Consigli	40	0	40	0	0	0
1	GK	(Italy) ITA	Giorgio Frezzolini	2	0	2	0	0	0
Defenders
1	DF	(Italy) ITA	Gianpaolo Bellini	33	0	33	0	0	0
1	DF	(Italy) ITA	Thomas Manfredini	17	1	17	1	0	0
1	DF	(Italy) ITA	Michele Ferri	9	0	9	0	0	0
1	DF	(Argentina) ARG	Leonardo Talamonti	9	0	9	0	0	0
1	DF	(Italy) ITA	Federico Peluso	33	1	33	1	0	0
1	DF	(Italy) ITA	Daniele Capelli	31	0	31	0	0	0
1	DF	(Denmark) DEN	Magnus Troest	25	1	25	1	0	0
1	DF	(Italy) ITA	Matteo Gentili	1	0	1	0	0	0
Midfielders
1	MF	(Italy) ITA	Cristian Raimondi	25	0	25	0	0	0
1	MF	(Italy) ITA	Simone Padoin	34	2	34	2	0	0
1	MF	(Serbia) SRB	Ivan Radovanović	2	0	2	0	0	0
1	MF	(Italy) ITA	Cristiano Doni	34	12	34	12	0	0
1	MF	(Italy) ITA	Gennaro Delvecchio	15	1	15	1	0	0
1	MF	(Brazil) BRA	Ferreira Pinto	19	2	19	2	0	0
1	MF	(Paraguay) PAR	Édgar Barreto	29	2	29	2	0	0
1	MF	(Italy) ITA	Leonardo Pettinari	17	2	17	2	0	0
1	MF	(Chile) CHI	Carlos Carmona	32	0	32	0	0	0
1	MF	(Albania) ALB	Migjen Basha	23	0	23	0	0	0
1	MF	(Italy) ITA	Nicola Madonna	1	0	1	0	0	0
1	MF	(Italy) ITA	Giacomo Bonaventura	31	9	31	9	0	0
Forwards
1	FW	(Italy) ITA	Simone Tiribocchi	34	14	34	14	0	0
1	FW	(Croatia) CRO	Saša Bjelanović	10	1	10	1	0	0
1	FW	(Italy) ITA	Francesco Ruopolo	31	8	31	8	0	0
1	FW	(Italy) ITA	Fabio Ceravolo	18	2	18	2	0	0
1	FW	(Italy) ITA	Matteo Ardemagni	16	1	16	1	0	0
1	FW	(Italy) ITA	Guido Marilungo	16	2	16	2	0	0

Source: Competitions
