= Francesco Rossi (footballer, born 1991) =

Italian footballer

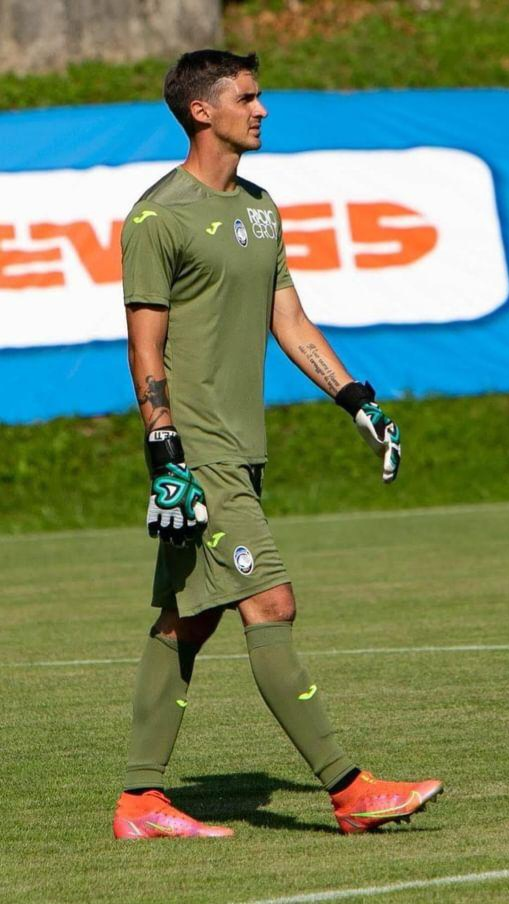
- Rossi with Atalanta in 2024

Personal information
- Date of birth: 27 April 1991 (age 35)
- Place of birth: Merate, Italy
- Height: 1.93 m (6 ft 4 in)
- Position: Goalkeeper

Youth career
- 1997–2003: Audace Osnago
- 2003–2009: Atalanta

Senior career*
Years	Team	Apps	(Gls)
2009–2026	Atalanta	6	(0)
2011	→ Lumezzane (loan)	3	(0)
2012–2013	→ Cuneo (loan)	47	(0)
2013–2014	→ Pavia (loan)	8	(0)
2014–2015	→ Lupa Roma (loan)	30	(1)
2015–2016	→ Prato (loan)	31	(0)
2016–2017	→ Teramo (loan)	19	(0)
Total		144	(1)

International career
2010	Italy U20	3	(0)
- * Club domestic league appearances and goals

Francesco Rossi (born 27 April 1991) is an Italian former professional footballer who played as a goalkeeper.

== Club career ==
Rossi began his footballing career with Audace Osnago, playing from 1997 to 2003, before transferring to Atalanta. At Atalanta, he played in youth categories, including Atalanta B.C. Primavera. In June 2009, he was promoted to first team to be a third-choice goalkeeper, and received the 91 jersey.

In July 2011, Rossi was loaned to Lumezzane, for one season, and he made his debut on 7 August, in a Coppa Italia match against Pro Patria. In the next phase, he stayed as a starter, and his team played against Torino, suffering a 1–0 away defeat and eventually knocked out of the Coppa Italia. However, in January 2012, his loan was terminated, and he joined Cuneo for the rest of the season. His loan was renewed for the 2012–13 season as well.

Rossi was signed by Pavia, Lupa Roma, Prato and Teramo in the 2013–14, 2014–15, 2015–16 and 2016–17 seasons respectively, all in temporary deals.

In January 2017, he returned to Atalanta and was assigned to the first team. Rossi, who joined the club as a young child, made eight competitive appearances in total: six in Serie A, one in the Coppa Italia, and one in the UEFA Europa League.

== Career statistics ==
Appearances and goals by club, season and competition
Club	Season	League			Coppa Italia		Europe		Other		Total	
Club	Season	Division	Apps	Goals	Apps	Goals	Apps	Goals	Apps	Goals	Apps	Goals
Atalanta	2009–10	Serie A	0	0	0	0	—		—		0	0
Atalanta	2010–11	Serie B	0	0	0	0	—		—		0	0
Atalanta	2016–17	Serie A	0	0	—		—		—		0	0
Atalanta	2017–18	Serie A	1	0	0	0	0	0	—		1	0
Atalanta	2018–19	Serie A	1	0	0	0	0	0	—		1	0
Atalanta	2019–20	Serie A	1	0	0	0	0	0	—		1	0
Atalanta	2020–21	Serie A	0	0	0	0	0	0	—		0	0
Atalanta	2021–22	Serie A	1	0	0	0	—		—		1	0
Atalanta	2022–23	Serie A	1	0	0	0	—		—		1	0
Atalanta	2023–24	Serie A	1	0	0	0	1 (Note: Appearance in UEFA Europa League)	0	—		2	0
Atalanta	2024–25	Serie A	0	0	1	0	0	0	0	0	1	0
Atalanta	Total		6	0	1	0	1	0	0	0	8	0
Lumezzane (loan)	2011–12	Prima Divisione	3	0	2	0	—		3 (Note: Appearances in Coppa Italia Serie C)	0	8	0
Cuneo (loan)	2011–12	Seconda Divisione	16	0	—		—		4 (Note: Appearances in Seconda Divisione promotion play-offs)	0	20	0
Cuneo (loan)	2012–13	Prima Divisione	31	0	0	0	—		2 (Note: Appearances in Prima Divisione relegation play-offs)	0	33	0
Cuneo (loan)	Total		47	0	0	0	—		6	0	53	0
Pavia (loan)	2013–14	Prima Divisione	8	0	0	0	—		—		8	0
Lupa Roma (loan)	2014–15	Lega Pro	30	1	0	0	—		2	0	32	1
Prato (loan)	2015–16	Lega Pro	31	0	0	0	—		2 (Note: Appearances in Serie C relegation play-offs)	0	33	0
Teramo (loan)	2016–17	Lega Pro	19	0	1	0	—		0	0	20	0
Career total			144	1	4	0	1	0	13	0	172	1

== Honours ==
Atalanta

- UEFA Europa League: 2023–24
