= Thomas Pfannkuch =

German footballer and manager (born 1970)

Personal information
- Date of birth: 21 February 1970 (age 56)
- Place of birth: Kassel, West Germany
- Height: 1.91 m (6 ft 3 in)
- Position: Defender

Youth career
- KSV Baunatal

Senior career*
Years	Team	Apps	(Gls)
1990–1991	Borussia Mönchengladbach	1	(0)
1991–1992	Lyon	11	(0)
1992–1999	Eintracht Braunschweig	218	(19)
1999–2001	SSV Reutlingen	6	(0)
2001–2002	SC Göttingen 05	35	(1)
2002–2005	Germania Halberstadt	30	(1)
Total		301	(21)

Managerial career
- 2005–2007: Germania Halberstadt
- 2008–2010: Eintracht Braunschweig (youth)
- * Club domestic league appearances and goals

Thomas Pfannkuch (born 21 February 1970) is a German football manager and former player. As a player, he spent one season each in the Bundesliga with Borussia Mönchengladbach and the French Ligue 1 with Olympique Lyonnais.

In 2014, Pfannkuch was named manager of the German cerebral palsy international football team.
