= Marco Varnier =

Italian footballer

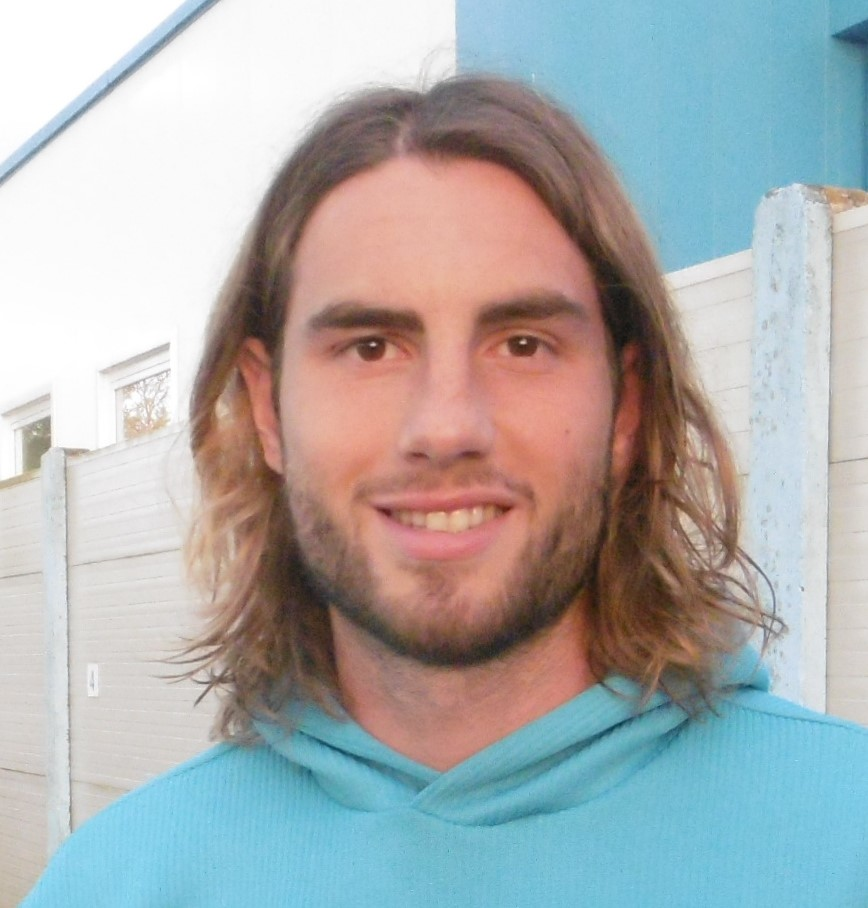

Personal information
- Date of birth: 8 June 1998 (age 28)
- Place of birth: Padua, Italy
- Height: 1.90 m (6 ft 3 in)
- Position: Centre-back

Team information
- Current team: Südtirol

Youth career
- Cittadella

Senior career*
Years	Team	Apps	(Gls)
2016–2019	Cittadella	48	(2)
2018–2019	→ Atalanta (loan)	0	(0)
2019–2023	Atalanta	0	(0)
2019–2021	→ Pisa (loan)	21	(0)
2021–2022	→ Como (loan)	12	(0)
2022–2023	→ SPAL (loan)	15	(1)
2023–2024	Atalanta U23	20	(0)
2024–2026	Juve Stabia	43	(2)
2026–	Südtirol	0	(0)

International career^{‡}
2017	Italy U19	4	(0)
2017	Italy U20	4	(0)
2017–2020	Italy U21	4	(0)
- * Club domestic league appearances and goals as of 10 May 2026 ‡ National team caps and goals as of 8 September 2020

Marco Varnier (born 8 June 1998) is an Italian footballer who plays as a centre back for Serie B club Südtirol.

== Club career ==
Varnier made his professional debut with Cittadella on 30 December 2016, aged 18, in a Serie B match against Virtus Entella. He obtained 14 league appearances on his first professional season. On 25 November 2017 he scored his career's first goal in the league match won 2–1 against Salernitana.

On 2 July 2018, he joined Serie A club Atalanta on a season-long loan with Atalanta holding an obligation to buy his rights at the end of the 2018–19 season. During his second training with Atalanta, Varnier suffered anterior cruciate ligament injury in his right knee and was unable to make any appearances in his first season.

On 27 August 2019, Varnier joined Pisa on loan. After only 3 games, Varnier suffered anterior cruciate ligament injury in his left knee and missed most of the 2019–20 season.

On 3 July 2021, he moved to Como on a season-long loan.

Varnier joined SPAL on a season-long loan on 2 July 2022. The loan includes an option to buy and a conditional obligation to buy.

On 10 July 2024, Varnier signed a one-season contract with Juve Stabia in Serie B.

== International career ==
He made his debut with the U21 team on 5 October 2017, in a friendly match won 6–2 against Hungary in Budapest.
