= Arkadiusz Reca =

Polish footballer

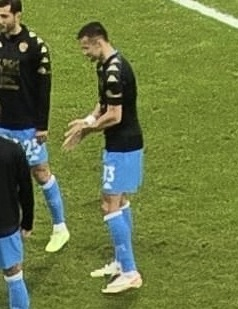
- Reca in 2024 with Spezia

Personal information
- Date of birth: 17 June 1995 (age 31)
- Place of birth: Chojnice, Poland
- Height: 1.87 m (6 ft 2 in)
- Position: Left-back

Team information
- Current team: Legia Warsaw
- Number: 13

Youth career
- Kolejarz Chojnice
- 2011–2012: Chojniczanka Chojnice

Senior career*
Years	Team	Apps	(Gls)
2011–2013	Chojniczanka Chojnice	1	(0)
2012–2013	Chojniczanka II/Jantar Pawłowo		
2013–2014	Koral Dębnica	26	(5)
2014–2015	Flota Świnoujście	28	(3)
2015–2018	Wisła Płock	93	(19)
2018–2022	Atalanta	3	(0)
2019–2020	→ SPAL (loan)	25	(0)
2020–2021	→ Crotone (loan)	30	(2)
2021–2022	→ Spezia (loan)	25	(0)
2022–2025	Spezia	72	(5)
2025–	Legia Warsaw	20	(0)

International career
2015	Poland U20	1	(0)
2016	Poland U21	3	(0)
2018–2022	Poland	15	(0)
- * Club domestic league appearances and goals as of 14:10, 29 May 2026 (UTC)

Arkadiusz Reca (Polish pronunciation: [arˈkadjuʂ ˈrɛt͡sa]; born 17 June 1995) is a Polish professional footballer who plays as a left-back for Ekstraklasa club Legia Warsaw.

== Club career ==
On 25 September 2020, Reca joined Crotone on loan.

On 26 August 2021, Reca moved to Spezia on four-year contract. On 29 August 2021, Atalanta clarified that the transfer was an initial loan with an obligation to buy. He left Spezia upon the expiration of his contract at the end of June 2025. On 18 July 2025 he signed for Polish Ekstraklasa club Legia Warsaw.

== International career ==
On 7 September 2018, Reca made his senior debut for Poland during an away match against Italy in the 2018–19 UEFA Nations League.

Reca was named in the provisional squad for Poland for the 2022 FIFA World Cup campaign, but omitted from the final 26-man squad.

== Career statistics ==
=== Club ===
As of match played 1 May 2026

Appearances and goals by club, season and competition
Club	Season	League			National cup (Note: Includes Polish Cup, Coppa Italia)		Europe		Other		Total	
Club	Season	Division	Apps	Goals	Apps	Goals	Apps	Goals	Apps	Goals	Apps	Goals
Chojniczanka Chojnice	2011–12	II liga West	1	0	—		—		—		1	0
Koral Dębnica	2013–14	III liga Baltic	26	5	—		—		—		26	5
Flota Świnoujście	2014–15	I liga	28	3	0	0	—		—		28	3
Wisła Płock	2015–16	I liga	28	12	1	0	—		—		29	12
Wisła Płock	2016–17	Ekstraklasa	32	4	0	0	—		—		32	4
Wisła Płock	2017–18	Ekstraklasa	33	3	0	0	—		—		33	3
Wisła Płock	Total		93	19	1	0	—		—		94	19
Atalanta	2018–19	Serie A	3	0	1	0	1 (Note: Appearance in UEFA Europa League)	0	—		5	0
SPAL (loan)	2019–20	Serie A	25	0	1	0	—		—		26	0
Crotone (loan)	2020–21	Serie A	30	2	1	0	—		—		31	2
Spezia (loan)	2021–22	Serie A	25	0	1	0	—		—		26	0
Spezia	2022–23	Serie A	30	1	1	0	—		1 (Note: Appearance in Serie A relegation tie-breaker)	0	32	1
Spezia	2023–24	Serie B	14	4	1	0	—		—		15	4
Spezia	2024–25	Serie B	25	0	0	0	—		3 (Note: Appearances in Serie B promotion play-offs)	0	28	0
Spezia	Total		94	5	3	0	0	0	4	0	101	5
Legia Warsaw	2025–26	Ekstraklasa	20	0	1	0	5 (Note: One appearance in UEFA Europa League, four appearances in UEFA Conference League)	0	—		26	0
Career total			320	34	8	0	6	0	4	0	338	34

=== International ===
Appearances and goals by national team and year
National team	Year	Apps	Goals
Poland	2018	3	0
Poland	2019	5	0
Poland	2020	4	0
Poland	2021	2	0
Poland	2022	1	0
Total		15	0
