= 2021 Coppa Italia final =

73rd Coppa Italia final
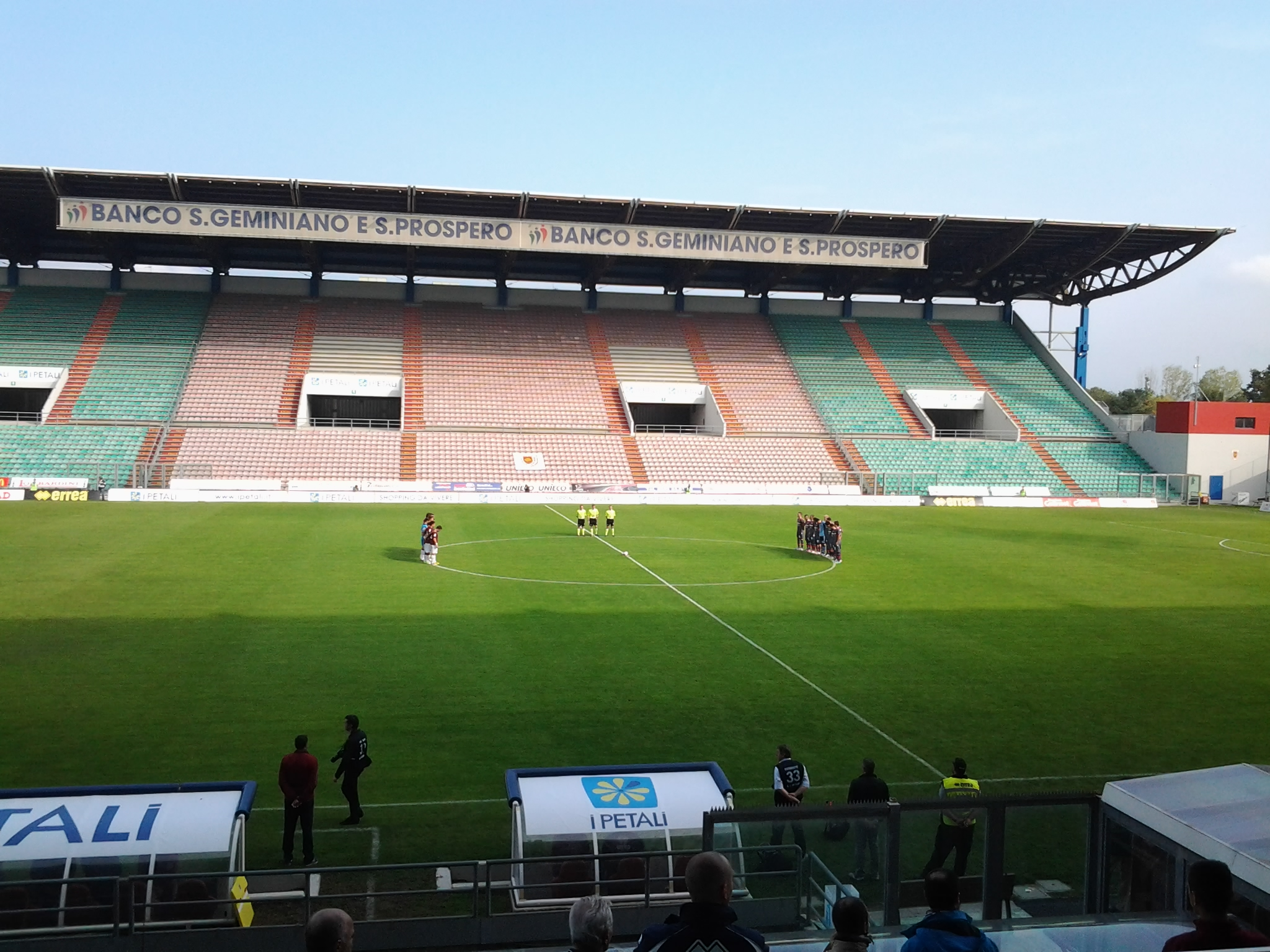
- Reggio Emilia hosted the final
- Event: 2020–21 Coppa Italia
Atalanta	Juventus
1	2
- Date: 19 May 2021
- Venue: Mapei Stadium – Città del Tricolore, Reggio Emilia
- Man of the Match: Federico Chiesa (Juventus)
- Referee: Davide Massa
- Attendance: 4,300 (Note: The total capacity of the stadium was established at 20% due to the COVID-19 pandemic in Italy.)

The 2021 Coppa Italia final decided the winners of the 2020–21 Coppa Italia, Italy's main football cup. It was played on 19 May 2021 for the first time at the Mapei Stadium – Città del Tricolore, Reggio Emilia, between Atalanta and Juventus. Juventus won the match 2–1 for a record fourteenth title.

As winners, Juventus would have automatically qualified to the group stage of the 2021–22 UEFA Europa League, although they had already qualified for European competition through their league position. They also earned the right to contest the 2021 Supercoppa Italiana against the champions of the 2020–21 Serie A, Internazionale.

== Background ==
Atalanta made its fifth appearance in the final, and second in three years. They recorded one win and three defeats in their previous four appearances, having lost three in a row after winning their only title in 1963. It was a record twentieth appearance for Juventus in a Coppa Italia final, and sixth appearance in the last seven years. Going into the final, Juventus had thirteen wins and six losses. The two teams had never met in a Coppa Italia final.

== Road to the final ==
Note: In all results below, the score of the finalist is given first (H: home; A: away).

Atalanta		Round	Juventus
Opponent	Result	2020–21 Coppa Italia	Opponent	Result
Cagliari (H)	3–1	Round of 16	Genoa (H)	3–2 (a.e.t.)
Lazio (H)	3–2	Quarter-finals	SPAL (H)	4–0
Napoli	0–0 (A), 3–1 (H) (3–1 agg.)	Semi-finals	Internazionale	2–1 (A), 0–0 (H) (2–1 agg.)

== Match ==
=== Details ===
19 May 2021
21:00 CEST

Atalanta	1–2	Juventus
Malinovskyi 41'	Report	Kulusevski 31'; Chiesa 73'

Mapei Stadium – Città del Tricolore, Reggio Emilia
Attendance: 4,300
Referee: Davide Massa

Atalanta	Juventus

GK	95	(Italy) Pierluigi Gollini
CB	2	(Italy) Rafael Tolói (c)	(red card) 88'	(substituted off) 77'
CB	17	(Argentina) Cristian Romero	(yellow card) 78'
CB	6	(Argentina) José Luis Palomino
RM	33	(Netherlands) Hans Hateboer		(substituted off) 76'
CM	11	(Switzerland) Remo Freuler	(yellow card) 85'
CM	15	(Netherlands) Marten de Roon	(yellow card) 88'
LM	8	(Germany) Robin Gosens		(substituted off) 83'
RW	18	(Ukraine) Ruslan Malinovskyi	(yellow card) 36'	(substituted off) 68'
LW	32	(Italy) Matteo Pessina		(substituted off) 68'
CF	91	(Colombia) Duván Zapata
Substitutes:
GK	31	(Italy) Francesco Rossi
GK	57	(Italy) Marco Sportiello
DF	3	(Denmark) Joakim Mæhle
DF	4	(Croatia) Boško Šutalo
DF	13	(Italy) Mattia Caldara
DF	19	(Albania) Berat Djimsiti		(substituted on) 77'
DF	40	(Italy) Matteo Ruggeri
MF	59	(Russia) Aleksei Miranchuk		(substituted on) 83'
MF	88	(Croatia) Mario Pašalić		(substituted on) 68'
FW	7	(Netherlands) Sam Lammers
FW	9	(Colombia) Luis Muriel		(substituted on) 68'
FW	72	(Slovenia) Josip Iličić	(yellow card) 89'	(substituted on) 76'
Manager:
(Italy) Gian Piero Gasperini

GK	77	(Italy) Gianluigi Buffon (c)	(yellow card) 27'
RB	16	(Colombia) Juan Cuadrado
CB	4	(Netherlands) Matthijs de Ligt	(yellow card) 40'
CB	3	(Italy) Giorgio Chiellini
LB	13	(Brazil) Danilo
RM	14	(United States) Weston McKennie
CM	30	(Uruguay) Rodrigo Bentancur
CM	25	(France) Adrien Rabiot
LM	22	(Italy) Federico Chiesa		(substituted off) 74'
CF	44	(Sweden) Dejan Kulusevski		(substituted off) 83'
CF	7	(Portugal) Cristiano Ronaldo
Substitutes:
GK	1	(Poland) Wojciech Szczęsny
GK	31	(Italy) Carlo Pinsoglio
DF	19	(Italy) Leonardo Bonucci		(substituted on) 83'
DF	28	(Turkey) Merih Demiral
DF	38	(Italy) Gianluca Frabotta
MF	5	(Brazil) Arthur
MF	8	(Wales) Aaron Ramsey
MF	33	(Italy) Federico Bernardeschi
FW	9	(Spain) Álvaro Morata
FW	10	(Argentina) Paulo Dybala		(substituted on) 74'
Manager:
(Italy) Andrea Pirlo

Man of the Match:
Federico Chiesa (Juventus)

Assistant referees:
Matteo Passeri
Alessandro Costanzo
Fourth official:
Marco Di Bello
Video assistant referee:
Paolo Valeri
Assistant video assistant referee:
Mauro Vivenzi

Match rules

- 90 minutes.
- 30 minutes of extra time if necessary.
- Penalty shoot-out if scores still level.
- Twelve named substitutes.
- Maximum of five substitutions, with a sixth allowed in extra time. (Note: Each team was given only three opportunities to make substitutions, excluding substitutions made at half-time, before the start of extra time and at half-time in extra time.)

== See also ==
- 2020–21 Atalanta BC season
- 2020–21 Juventus FC season
- 2024 Coppa Italia final - played between same teams
