= 2022–23 Atalanta BC season =

Atalanta BC
2022–23 season
- President: Antonio Percassi
- Head coach: Gian Piero Gasperini
- Stadium: Gewiss Stadium
- Serie A: 5th
- Coppa Italia: Quarter-finals
- Top goalscorer: League: Ademola Lookman (13); All: Ademola Lookman (15)
Home colours	Away colours	Third colours

The 2022–23 season was the 115th season in the history of Atalanta BC and the club's 12th consecutive season in the top flight. The club participated in Serie A and the Coppa Italia.

== Players ==
As of 31 January 2023

Note: Flags indicate national team as defined under FIFA eligibility rules; some limited exceptions apply. Players may hold more than one non-FIFA nationality.

No.	Pos.	Nation	Player
1	GK	ARG	Juan Musso
2	DF	ITA	Rafael Tolói (captain)
3	DF	DEN	Joakim Mæhle
5	DF	ITA	Caleb Okoli
6	DF	ARG	José Luis Palomino
7	MF	NED	Teun Koopmeiners
9	FW	COL	Luis Muriel
10	MF	CIV	Jérémie Boga
11	FW	NGR	Ademola Lookman
13	MF	BRA	Éderson
15	MF	NED	Marten de Roon (vice-captain)
17	FW	DEN	Rasmus Højlund

No.	Pos.	Nation	Player
19	DF	ALB	Berat Djimsiti
22	DF	ITA	Matteo Ruggeri
23	FW	CZE	Lukáš Vorlický
28	DF	TUR	Merih Demiral
31	GK	ITA	Francesco Rossi
33	DF	NED	Hans Hateboer
42	DF	ITA	Giorgio Scalvini
57	GK	ITA	Marco Sportiello
77	DF	ITA	Davide Zappacosta
88	MF	CRO	Mario Pašalić
91	FW	COL	Duván Zapata
93	DF	FRA	Brandon Soppy

== Transfers ==
=== In ===
Date	Pos.	Player	Age	Moving from	Fee	Notes
17 June 2022	DF	(Turkey) Merih Demiral	24	(Italy) Juventus	€20M	Option to buy activated
1 July 2022	FW	(Ivory Coast) Jérémie Boga	25	(Italy) Sassuolo	€22M	Obligation to buy activated
6 July 2022	MF	(Brazil) Éderson	22	(Italy) Salernitana	€21M	Part of swap deal with Matteo Lovato
4 August 2022	MF	(Nigeria) Ademola Lookman	24	(Germany) RB Leipzig	€9M	
19 August 2022	RB	(France) Brandon Soppy	20	(Italy) Udinese	€9M	Plus €1M in add-ons
27 August 2022	FW	(Denmark) Rasmus Højlund	19	(Austria) Sturm Graz	€17M	

=== Out ===
Date	Pos.	Player	Age	Moving to	Fee	Notes
21 June 2022	DF	(Croatia) Boško Šutalo	22	(Croatia) Dinamo Zagreb	€4M	
1 July 2022	DF	(Germany) Robin Gosens	27	(Italy) Inter Milan	€15m	Obligation to buy activated (Note: Inter is also expected to pay €10m of additional bonuses, reaching a potential €25m transfer fee.)
1 July 2022	MF	(Italy) Andrea Colpani	23	(Italy) Monza	€9M	Obligation to buy activated
6 July 2022	DF	(Italy) Matteo Lovato	22	(Italy) Salernitana	€7M	Part of swap deal with Éderson
6 July 2022	MF	(Italy) Matteo Pessina	25	(Italy) Monza	Loan	With obligation to buy
9 July 2022	GK	(Italy) Pierluigi Gollini	27	(Italy) Fiorentina	Loan	
7 August 2022	FW	(Netherlands) Sam Lammers	25	(Italy) Empoli	Loan	
11 August 2022	MF	(Russia) Aleksei Miranchuk	26	(Italy) Torino	Loan	With option to buy
13 August 2022	FW	(The Gambia) Ebrima Colley	22	(Turkey) Fatih Karagümrük	Loan	
14 August 2022	MF	(Switzerland) Remo Freuler	30	(England) Nottingham Forest	€9M	
30 August 2022	DF	(Argentina) Cristian Romero	24	(England) Tottenham Hotspur	€50M	Option to buy activated
31 August 2022	MF	(Slovenia) Josip Iličić	34	Free agent		
2 January 2023	FW	(Netherlands) Sam Lammers	25	(Italy) Sampdoria	Loan	
9 January 2023	MF	(Ukraine) Ruslan Malinovskyi	29	(France) Marseille	Loan	With option to buy
25 January 2023	GK	(Italy) Pierluigi Gollini	27	(Italy) Napoli	Loan	
31 January 2023	DF	(Italy) Nadir Zortea	23	(Italy) Sassuolo	Loan	With option to buy

== Pre-season and friendlies ==
Win Draw Loss Fixtures

10 July 2022 Friendly	Atalanta (Italy)	15–0	(Italy) Rappresentativa Valseriana	Clusone
17:00 CEST (UTC+2)	Palomino 9'; Boga 13', 17', 43'; Muriel 20'; Zapata 41'; Miranchuk 50', 53', 69'; Malinovskyi 67', 90'; Lammers 82'; Hateboer 85'; Cissé 87'; Koopmeiners 88'	Report		Stadium: Centro Sportivo "Città di Clusone"; Referee: Alessandro Gresia

13 July 2022 Friendly	Atalanta (Italy)	10–0	(Italy) Rappresentativa Valli Bergamasche	Clusone
17:00 CEST (UTC+2)	Éderson 9'; Muriel 27', 46'; Zapata 44'; Boga 48', 78'; Malinovskyi 69', 86'; Cissé 71'; Pašalić 88'	Report		Stadium: Centro Sportivo "Città di Clusone"; Referee: Riccardo Fichera

16 July 2022 Friendly	Atalanta (Italy)	12–1	(Switzerland) Gambarogno-Contone	Clusone
17:00 CEST (UTC+2)	Koopmeiners 4', 11'; Muriel 19', 25', 35' (pen.); Okoli 32'; Boga 51'; Pašalić 53', 78', 79'; Djimsiti 58'; Malinovskyi 88'	Report	Demiral 82' (o.g.)	Stadium: Centro Sportivo "Città di Clusone"; Referee: Simone Nuzzo

20 July 2022 Friendly	Atalanta A (Note: The Atalanta squad was divided into two teams for an in-house friendly, with team A playing in home colours and team B playing in away colours.) (Italy)	5–4	(Italy) Atalanta B	Zingonia
17:00 CEST (UTC+2)	Muriel 5'; Pašalić 16', 44'; Hateboer 40'; Mæhle 60'	Report	Zapata 1', 64', 74' (pen.); Koopmeiners 22'	Stadium: Centro Sportivo Bortolotti

23 July 2022 Friendly	Atalanta (Italy)	4–0	(Italy) Como	Zingonia
17:00 CEST (UTC+2)	Palomino 66'; Éderson 69'; Zortea 88'; Lammers 89'	Report		Stadium: Centro Sportivo Bortolotti; Attendance: 0 Referee: Alberto Santoro

29 July 2022 Friendly	Newcastle United (England)	1–0	(Italy) Atalanta	Newcastle upon Tyne, England
19:45 BST (UTC+1)	Wood 37' (pen.)	Report		Stadium: St James' Park; Attendance: 40,596; Referee: Peter Bankes (England)

6 August 2022 Orange Trophy	Valencia (Spain)	2–1	(Italy) Atalanta	Valencia, Spain
21:00 CEST (UTC+2)	Duro 43', 81'	Report	Éderson 53'	Stadium: Mestalla; Referee: Antonio Mateu Lahoz (Spain)

23 August 2022 Friendly	Atalanta (Italy)	3–1	(Italy) Sporting Franciacorta	Zingonia
16:30 CEST (UTC+2) (Note: Each half lasted 40 minutes instead of 45 minutes.)	Muriel 22', 67'; Lookman 33'	Report	Bertazzoli 80'	Stadium: Centro Sportivo Bortolotti; Referee: Alessandro Di Graci

7 September 2022 Friendly	Atalanta (Italy)	5–1	(Italy) Sant'Angelo	Zingonia
16:00 CEST (UTC+2)	Scalvini 14', 19'; De Nipoti 36'; Mæhle 50'; Boga 67' (pen.)	Report	Silla 61'	Stadium: Centro Sportivo Bortolotti; Referee: Alessandro Pizzi
Note: The first half lasted 45 minutes and the second half lasted 36 minutes.

29 September 2022 Friendly	Atalanta (Italy)	4–1	(Italy) Pro Patria	Zingonia
15:30 CEST (UTC+2)	Muriel 6'; Vorlicky 10', 45'; Pašalić 59'	Report	Nicco 58'	Stadium: Centro Sportivo Bortolotti; Referee: Kevin Bonacina

9 December 2022 Trofeo Bortolotti	Atalanta (Italy)	2–2 (3–5 p)	(Germany) Eintracht Frankfurt	Bergamo
20:00 CET (UTC+1)	Lookman 15'; Højlund 50'; Zortea (yellow card) 88'	Report	Alario 43', 48'; Borré (yellow card) 82'	Stadium: Gewiss Stadium; Attendance: 9,000; Referee: Alessandro Prontera (Italy)
	Penalties
	Tolói (penalty missed); Zapata (penalty scored); Éderson (penalty scored); Scalvini (penalty scored)		(penalty scored) Pellegrini; (penalty scored) Ndicka; (penalty scored) Dina Ebimbe; (penalty scored) Alario; (penalty scored) Borré

13 December 2022 Friendly	Atalanta (Italy)	2–1	(Italy) Real Calepina	Zingonia
14:30 CET (UTC+1)	Zapata 11', 22'	Report	Denis 33'	Stadium: Centro Sportivo Bortolotti; Attendance: 0 Referee: Alessandro Pizzi
Note: Match was played in two forty-minute halves.

17 December 2022 Friendly	Nice (France)	0–3	(Italy) Atalanta	Nice, France
13:00 CET (UTC+1)		Report	Højlund 18'; Zapata 22'; Malinovskyi (yellow card) 46'; Scalvini (yellow card) 49'; Boga 90+2'	Stadium: Allianz Riviera; Referee: Eric Wattellier (France)

23 December 2022 Friendly	Real Betis (Spain)	0–3	(Italy) Atalanta	Seville, Spain
17:00 CET (UTC+1)		Report	Muriel 22'; De Roon 27'; Éderson 48'	Stadium: Benito Villamarín; Referee: Mario Melero López (Spain)

29 December 2022 Friendly	Atalanta (Italy)	0–1	(Netherlands) AZ	Bergamo
19:00 CET (UTC+1)	Zapata (penalty missed) 79'	Report	Evjen 1'	Stadium: Gewiss Stadium; Referee: Andrea Colombo (Italy)

30 December 2022 Friendly	Atalanta (Italy)	10–1	(Italy) Crema	Zingonia
15:00 CET (UTC+1)	Malinovskyi 11'; Zapata 22', 49', 77', 89'; Pašalić 31'; Zappacosta 45'; Muriel 73' (pen.), 86'; Scalvini 83'	Report	Abba 66'	Stadium: Centro Sportivo Bortolotti; Referee: Paride Tremolada

== Competitions ==
=== Overall record ===
Competition	First match	Last match	Starting round	Final position	Record							
Competition	First match	Last match	Starting round	Final position	Pld	W	D	L	GF	GA	GD	Win %
Serie A	13 August 2022	4 June 2023	Matchday 1	5th	38	19	7	12	66	48	+18	50.00
Coppa Italia	19 January 2023	31 January 2023	Round of 16	Quarter-finals	2	1	0	1	5	3	+2	50.00
Total					40	20	7	13	71	51	+20	50.00

Source: Soccerway

=== Serie A ===
==== League table ====
Pos	Team	Pld	W	D	L	GF	GA	GD	Pts	Qualification or relegation
3	Inter Milan	38	23	3	12	71	42	+29	72	Qualification for the Champions League group stage (Note: Should the first and second, or 17th and 18th-placed teams at the end of the season be tied on points, a play-off tiebreaker match was held at a neutral site to determine the title and final team relegated respectively.)
4	Milan	38	20	10	8	64	43	+21	70	Qualification for the Champions League group stage
5	Atalanta	38	19	7	12	66	48	+18	64	Qualification for the Europa League group stage (Note: Since the winners of the 2022–23 Coppa Italia, Inter Milan, qualified for the Champions League, the Europa League berth awarded to the Coppa Italia winners was passed to the sixth-placed team, and the Europa Conference League berth awarded to the sixth-placed team was passed to the seventh-placed team.)
6	Roma	38	18	9	11	50	38	+12	63	Qualification for the Europa League group stage
7	Juventus (Note: Juventus were excluded from UEFA competitions due to violation of UEFA's financial regulations.)	38	22	6	10	56	33	+23	62 (Note: Juventus were deducted 10 points as punishment for capital gain violations.)	

Source: Serie A
Rules for classification: 1) Points; 2) Tiebreaker for Champions team and third relegated team; 3) Head-to-head points; 4) Head-to-head goal difference; 5) Goal difference; 6) Goals scored; 7) Draw. (Note: Head-to-head record is used only after all the matches between the teams in question have been played)

==== Results summary ====
Overall								Home						Away					
Pld	W	D	L	GF	GA	GD	Pts	W	D	L	GF	GA	GD	W	D	L	GF	GA	GD
38	19	7	12	66	48	+18	64	10	3	6	38	26	+12	9	4	6	28	22	+6

Source: Serie A

==== Results by round ====
Round	1	2	3	4	5	6	7	8	9	10	11	12	13	14	15	16	17	18	19	20	21	22	23	24	25	26	27	28	29	30	31	32	33	34	35	36	37	38
Ground	A	H	A	H	A	H	A	H	A	H	H	A	H	A	H	A	A	H	A	H	A	A	H	A	H	A	H	A	H	A	H	A	H	H	A	H	A	H
Result	W	D	W	W	W	D	W	W	D	W	L	W	L	L	L	D	W	W	D	W	L	W	L	L	D	L	W	W	L	D	W	W	W	L	L	W	L	W
Position	4	6	4	1	1	2	2	2	2	2	4	2	4	6	6	7	6	6	6	4	5	3	6	6	6	6	6	6	6	6	7	7	5	6	7	5	5	5

Source: Serie A
A = Away; H = Home; W = Win; D = Draw; L = Loss

==== Matches ====
The league fixtures were announced on 24 June 2022.

13 August 2022 1	Sampdoria	0–2	Atalanta	Genoa
18:30 CEST (UTC+2)	Ferrari (yellow card) 1'; Verre (yellow card) 73'; Quagliarella (yellow card) 81'; Sabiri (yellow card) 81'	Report	Okoli (yellow card) 19'; Tolói 26'; Pašalić (yellow card) 45'; Musso (yellow card) 80'; De Roon (yellow card) 84'; Zortea (yellow card) 88'; Hateboer (yellow card) 90+3'; Lookman 90+5'	Stadium: Stadio Luigi Ferraris; Attendance: 20,047; Referee: Federico Dionisi

21 August 2022 2	Atalanta	1–1	Milan	Bergamo
20:45 CEST (UTC+2)	Tolói (yellow card) 16'; Malinovskyi 29'; Hateboer (yellow card) 48'; Djimsiti (yellow card) 78'; De Roon (yellow card) 90+5'	Report	Rebić (yellow card) 45+1'; Bennacer 68'; Tonali (yellow card) 75'; Hernandez (yellow card) 78'	Stadium: Gewiss Stadium; Attendance: 19,216; Referee: Fabio Maresca

28 August 2022 3	Hellas Verona	0–1	Atalanta	Verona
18:30 CEST (UTC+2)	Ceccherini (yellow card) 62'; Hien (yellow card) 82'; Henry (yellow card) 82'	Report	Soppy (yellow card) 23'; Koopmeiners (yellow card) 38', (goal) 50'; Malinovskyi (yellow card) 59'	Stadium: Stadio Marcantonio Bentegodi; Attendance: 16,106; Referee: Alessandro Prontera

1 September 2022 4	Atalanta	3–1	Torino	Bergamo
20:45 CEST (UTC+2)	Zappacosta (yellow card) 41'; Koopmeiners 45+4' (pen.), 47', 84' (pen.)	Report	Aina (yellow card) 19'; Buongiorno (yellow card) 46'; Vlašić 77', (yellow card) 83'	Stadium: Gewiss Stadium; Attendance: 17,928; Referee: Marco Di Bello

5 September 2022 5	Monza	0–2	Atalanta	Monza
18:30 CET (UTC+1)	Rovella (yellow card) 76'	Report	Højlund 57'; Marlon 65' (o.g.); Scalvini (yellow card) 80'	Stadium: Stadio Brianteo; Attendance: 11,970; Referee: Juan Luca Sacchi

11 September 2022 6	Atalanta	1–1	Cremonese	Bergamo
12:30 CEST (UTC+2)	Okoli (yellow card) 65'; Demiral 74', (yellow card) 90+3'; Éderson (yellow card) 90+3'	Report	Sernicola (yellow card) 58'; Lochoshvili (yellow card) 62'; Pickel (yellow card) 66'; Ascacíbar (yellow card) 71'; Valeri 78'; Afena-Gyan (yellow card) 82'	Stadium: Gewiss Stadium; Attendance: 18,252; Referee: Andrea Colombo

18 September 2022 7	Roma	0–1	Atalanta	Rome
18:00 CEST (UTC+2)		Report	Mæhle (yellow card) 23'; Scalvini 35'; Tolói (yellow card) 47'; Hateboer (yellow card) 55'; Demiral (yellow card) 76'; De Roon (yellow card) 80'; Koopmeiners (yellow card) 87'; Malinovskyi (yellow card) 90+4'	Stadium: Stadio Olimpico; Attendance: 61,335; Referee: Daniele Chiffi

2 October 2022 8	Atalanta	1–0	Fiorentina	Bergamo
18:00 CEST (UTC+2)	Scalvini (yellow card) 31'; Lookman 59'; Hateboer (yellow card) 80'	Report	Bonaventura (yellow card) 5'; Amrabat (yellow card) 85'	Stadium: Gewiss Stadium; Attendance: 18,265; Referee: Massimiliano Irrati

9 October 2022 9	Udinese	2–2	Atalanta	Udine
15:00 CEST (UTC+2)	Bijol (yellow card) 8'; Deulofeu 67'; Ebosse (yellow card) 70'; Pérez 78'	Report	Lookman 36', (yellow card) 37'; Muriel 56' (pen.); Hateboer (yellow card) 90+1'	Stadium: Stadio Friuli; Attendance: 24,671; Referee: Daniele Doveri

15 October 2022 10	Atalanta	2–1	Sassuolo	Bergamo
20:45 CEST (UTC+2)	Scalvini (yellow card) 16'; Pašalić 45+1'; Lookman 46'	Report	Kyriakopoulos (yellow card) 21', (goal) 41'; Pinamonti (yellow card) 24'; Thorstvedt (yellow card) 30'; Ferrari (yellow card) 83'	Stadium: Gewiss Stadium; Attendance: 17,772; Referee: Matteo Marcenaro

23 October 2022 11	Atalanta	0–2	Lazio	Bergamo
18:00 CEST (UTC+2)	Okoli (yellow card) 12'; Soppy (yellow card) 45+1'; Muriel (yellow card) 59' (yellow-red card) 90'	Report	Zaccagni 10'; Felipe Anderson 52'; Cataldi (yellow card) 70'; Milinković-Savić (yellow card) 88'	Stadium: Gewiss Stadium; Attendance: 18,988; Referee: Rosario Abisso

30 October 2022 12	Empoli	0–2	Atalanta	Empoli
12:30 CET (UTC+1)	De Winter (yellow card) 38'; Destro (yellow card) 39'	Report	Hateboer 32', (yellow card) 83'; Koopmeiners (penalty missed) 42'; Lookman 59'	Stadium: Stadio Carlo Castellani; Attendance: 8,740; Referee: Giovanni Ayroldi

5 November 2022 13	Atalanta	1–2	Napoli	Bergamo
18:00 CET (UTC+1)	Lookman 19' (pen.); Demiral (yellow card) 36'; Højlund (yellow card) 58'; Mæhle (yellow card) 90+2'; Tolói (yellow card) 90+3'; Zapata (yellow card) 90+4'	Report	Osimhen 23'; Elmas 35'; Kim (yellow card) 57'	Stadium: Gewiss Stadium; Attendance: 19,363; Referee: Maurizio Mariani

9 November 2022 14	Lecce	2–1	Atalanta	Lecce
18:30 CET (UTC+1)	Baschirotto 28'; Di Francesco 30'; Pongračić (yellow card) 68'	Report	Zapata 40'; Ruggeri (yellow card) 76'; Koopmeiners (yellow card) 87'	Stadium: Stadio Via del mare Attendance: 19,948; Referee: Gianluca Aureliano

13 November 2022 15	Atalanta	2–3	Internazionale	Bergamo
12:30 CET (UTC+1)	Lookman 25' (pen.); Palomino 77'	Report	Džeko 36', 56'; Palomino 61' (o.g.); De Vrij (yellow card) 74'; Škriniar (yellow card) 85'; Onana (yellow card) 87'	Stadium: Gewiss Stadium; Attendance: 19,353; Referee: Daniele Chiffi

4 January 2023 16	Spezia	2–2	Atalanta	La Spezia
14:30 CET (UTC+1)	Gyasi 8'; Nzola 31'; Kiwior (yellow card) 49'; Ampadu (yellow card) 56'; Nikolaou (yellow card) 83'	Report	Lookman (yellow card) 45+7'; Zappacosta (yellow card) 58'; Højlund 77'; Pašalić 90+2'	Stadium: Stadio Alberto Picco; Attendance: 7,414; Referee: Antonio Giua

9 January 2023 17	Bologna	1–2	Atalanta	Bologna
20:45 CET (UTC+1)	Orsolini 6'; Medel (yellow card) 66'; Lykogiannis (yellow card) 84'; Domínguez (yellow card) 90+4'	Report	De Roon (yellow card) 26'; Pašalić (yellow card) 38'; Koopmeiners 47'; Højlund 58'	Stadium: Stadio Renato Dall'Ara; Attendance: 16,953; Referee: Marco Di Bello

15 January 2023 18	Atalanta	8–2	Salernitana	Bergamo
18:00 CET (UTC+1)	Boga 5'; Lookman 20' (pen.), 54'; Scalvini 23'; Koopmeiners (yellow card) 30', (penalty missed) 38', 38'; Højlund 41'; Éderson 61'; Zortea 85'	Report	Dia 10'; Nicolussi 56'	Stadium: Gewiss Stadium; Attendance: 18,499; Referee: Gianluca Aureliano

22 January 2023 19	Juventus	3–3	Atalanta	Turin
20:45 CET (UTC+1)	Di María 25'; Milik 34'; Danilo 65'; Chiesa (yellow card) 90+3'	Report	Lookman 5', 53'; Mæhle 46'; Éderson (yellow card) 49'; Hateboer (yellow card) 90+3'	Stadium: Juventus Stadium; Attendance: 33,565; Referee: Livio Marinelli

28 January 2023 20	Atalanta	2–0	Sampdoria	Bergamo
20:45 CET (UTC+1)	Mæhle 42'; Lookman 57'	Report	Malagrida (yellow card) 86'; Léris (yellow card) 88'	Stadium: Gewiss Stadium; Attendance: 19,095; Referee: Daniele Doveri

4 February 2023 21	Sassuolo	1–0	Atalanta	Reggio Emilia
20:45 CET (UTC+1)	Rogério (yellow card) 33'; Laurienté 55', (yellow card) 63'; Defrel (yellow card) 69'; Zortea (yellow card) 84'; Thorstvedt (yellow card) 90'	Report	Mæhle (red card) 30'; Scalvini (yellow card) 43'; Muriel (red card) 90+6'	Stadium: Mapei Stadium – Città del Tricolore; Attendance: 11,000; Referee: Matteo Marcenaro

11 February 2023 22	Lazio	0–2	Atalanta	Rome
20:45 CET (UTC+1)	Zaccagni (yellow card) 40'	Report	Zappacosta 23'; Scalvini (yellow card) 57'; De Roon (yellow card) 60'; Højlund 65'	Stadium: Stadio Olimpico; Attendance: 40,000; Referee: Daniele Orsato

19 February 2023 23	Atalanta	1–2	Lecce	Bergamo
12:30 CET (UTC+1)	Demiral (yellow card) 5'; Zappacosta (yellow card) 12'; Mæhle (yellow card) 83'; Højlund 87'	Report	Ceesay 4'; Di Francesco (yellow card) 55'; Gallo (yellow card) 64'; Blin 74', (yellow card) 76'	Stadium: Gewiss Stadium; Attendance: 19,435; Referee: Marco Piccinini

26 February 2023 24	Milan	2–0	Atalanta	Milan
20:45 CET (UTC+1)	Musso 26' (o.g.); Leão (yellow card) 28'; Thiaw (yellow card) 66'; Messias 86'; Krunić (yellow card) 90'	Report	Tolói (yellow card) 28'	Stadium: San Siro; Attendance: 72,202; Referee: Maurizio Mariani

4 March 2023 25	Atalanta	0–0	Udinese	Bergamo
18:00 CET (UTC+1)	Éderson (yellow card) 44'; Djimsiti (yellow card) 45+2'	Report	Lovrić (yellow card) 35'; Becão (yellow card) 42'; Ebosele (yellow card) 77'	Stadium: Gewiss Stadium; Attendance: 18,475; Referee: Davide Ghersini

11 March 2023 26	Napoli	2–0	Atalanta	Naples
18:00 CET (UTC+1)	Osimhen (yellow card) 18'; Kvaratskhelia 60'; Rrahmani 77'	Report	Ruggeri (yellow card) 15'; Scalvini (yellow card) 30'	Stadium: Stadio Diego Armando Maradona; Attendance: 50,601; Referee: Andrea Colombo

17 March 2023 27	Atalanta	2–1	Empoli	Bergamo
20:45 CET (UTC+1)	De Roon 58'; Lookman (yellow card) 85'; Højlund 86'; Palomino (yellow card) 88'; Ruggeri (yellow card) 90+1'	Report	Ebuehi 44'; Henderson (yellow card) 82'; Bandinelli (yellow card) 84'	Stadium: Gewiss Stadium; Attendance: 17,864; Referee: Federico Dionisi

2 April 2023 28	Cremonese	1–3	Atalanta	Cremona
12:30 CEST (UTC+2)	Lochoshvili (yellow card) 21'; Ciofani 56' (pen.), (yellow card) 60'; Bianchetti (yellow card) 82'	Report	Pašalić (yellow card) 39'; De Roon 44'; Tolói (yellow card) 54'; Boga 72'; Lookman 90+3'	Stadium: Stadio Giovanni Zini; Attendance: 11,891; Referee: Livio Marinelli

8 April 2023 29	Atalanta	0–2	Bologna	Bergamo
16:30 CEST (UTC+2)	Zappacosta (yellow card) 11'; Palomino (yellow card) 68'; Djimsiti (yellow card) 70'	Report	Sansone 49'; Lucumí (yellow card) 61'; Orsolini (yellow card) 81', (goal) 86'	Stadium: Gewiss Stadium; Attendance: 18,950; Referee: Daniele Orsato

17 April 2023 30	Fiorentina	1–1	Atalanta	Florence
20:45 CEST (UTC+2)	Cabral 56' (pen.); Martínez Quarta (yellow card) 75'	Report	Mæhle 37', (yellow card) 38'; Éderson (yellow card) 60'; Tolói (yellow card) 72'	Stadium: Stadio Artemio Franchi; Attendance: 29,628; Referee: Marco Guida

24 April 2023 31	Atalanta	3–1	Roma	Bergamo
20:45 CEST (UTC+2)	De Roon (yellow card) 30'; Pašalić 39'; Tolói 74'; Koopmeiners 84', (yellow card) 90+5'; Palomino (yellow card) 86'	Report	Solbakken (yellow card) 60'; Pellegrini 83'	Stadium: Gewiss Stadium; Attendance: 19,123; Referee: Massimiliano Irrati

29 April 2023 32	Torino	1–2	Atalanta	Turin
20:45 CEST (UTC+2)	Rodriguez (yellow card) 31'; Sanabria 75'	Report	Zappacosta 34'; Palomino (yellow card) 81'; Zapata 88'	Stadium: Stadio Olimpico Grande Torino; Attendance: 20,196; Referee: Juan Luca Sacchi

3 May 2023 33	Atalanta	3–2	Spezia	Bergamo
18:00 CEST (UTC+2)	De Roon 32'; Zappacosta 48'; Muriel 54'	Report	Gyasi 18'; Ampadu (yellow card) 38'; Bastoni (yellow card) 40'; Bourabia 64'; Agudelo (yellow card) 75'	Stadium: Gewiss Stadium; Attendance: 17,417; Referee: Livio Marinelli

7 May 2023 34	Atalanta	0–2	Juventus	Bergamo
12:30 CEST (UTC+2)	Mæhle (yellow card) 90+1'	Report	Iling-Junior 56'; Rabiot (yellow card) 62'; Vlahović 90+8', (yellow card) 90+9'	Stadium: Gewiss Stadium; Attendance: 19,570; Referee: Daniele Doveri

13 May 2023 35	Salernitana	1–0	Atalanta	Salerno
15:00 CEST (UTC+2)	Lovato (yellow card) 59'; Coulibaly (yellow card) 76'; Candreva 90+3'	Report	Scalvini (yellow card) 49'; De Roon (yellow card) 60'	Stadium: Stadio Arechi; Attendance: 17,400; Referee: Marco Piccinini

20 May 2023 36	Atalanta	3–1	Hellas Verona	Bergamo
18:00 CEST (UTC+2)	Zappacosta 22'; Koopmeiners (yellow card) 24'; Pašalić 53'; Højlund 62'	Report	Lazović 11'; Hien (yellow card) 28'; Depaoli (yellow card) 36'; Faraoni (yellow card) 90+3'	Stadium: Gewiss Stadium; Attendance: 9,297; Referee: Simone Sozza

27 May 2023 37	Internazionale	3–2	Atalanta	Milan
20:45 CEST (UTC+2)	Lukaku 1'; Barella 3'; Martínez 77'	Report	Pašalić 36'; Tolói (yellow card) 58'; Onana 90+1' (o.g.)	Stadium: San Siro; Attendance: 72,192; Referee: Daniele Orsato

4 June 2023 38	Atalanta	5–2	Monza	Bergamo
21:00 CEST (UTC+2)	Koopmeiners 12', 45+1', 79'; Tolói (yellow card) 64'; Højlund 74'; Muriel 90+2'	Report	Rovella (yellow card) 33'; Colpani 51'; Izzo (yellow card) 63'; Marlon (red card) 71'; Petagna 81'	Stadium: Gewiss Stadium; Attendance: 19,389; Referee: Marco Di Bello

=== Coppa Italia ===
19 January 2023 Round of 16	Atalanta	5–2	Spezia	Bergamo
15:00 CET (UTC+1)	Éderson (yellow card) 5'; Lookman 10', 12'; Hateboer 26'; Højlund 72'; Ampadu 90' (o.g.)	Report	Ekdal 14'; Verde 38'; Hristov (yellow card) 66'; Ampadu (yellow card) 89'	Stadium: Gewiss Stadium; Attendance: 7,483; Referee: Andrea Colombo

31 January 2023 Quarter-finals	Internazionale	1–0	Atalanta	Milan
21:00 CET (UTC+1)	Gosens (yellow card) 32'; Darmian 57'; Martínez (yellow card) 82'; Correa (yellow card) 90+1'; Onana (yellow card) 90+4'	Report	Soppy (yellow card) 90'	Stadium: San Siro; Attendance: 49,515; Referee: Daniele Chiffi

== Statistics ==
=== Appearances and goals ===
No.	Pos	Nat	Player	Total		Serie A		Coppa Italia	
No.	Pos	Nat	Player	Apps	Goals	Apps	Goals	Apps	Goals
Goalkeepers
1	GK	(Argentina) ARG	Juan Musso	26	0	24	0	2	0
31	GK	(Italy) ITA	Francesco Rossi	1	0	0+1	0	0	0
47	GK	(Italy) ITA	Tommaso Bertini (Note: Aggregated to the first team from the Primavera (youth) team)	0	0	0	0	0	0
57	GK	(Italy) ITA	Marco Sportiello	15	0	14+1	0	0	0
Defenders
2	DF	(Italy) ITA	Rafael Tolói	34	2	32	2	1+1	0
3	DF	(Denmark) DEN	Joakim Mæhle	36	3	25+9	3	2	0
5	DF	(Italy) ITA	Caleb Okoli	17	0	9+8	0	0	0
6	DF	(Argentina) ARG	José Luis Palomino	16	1	8+7	1	1	0
19	DF	(Albania) ALB	Berat Djimsiti	26	0	20+4	0	2	0
22	DF	(Italy) ITA	Matteo Ruggeri	15	0	8+7	0	0	0
28	DF	(Turkey) TUR	Merih Demiral	28	1	14+14	1	0	0
33	DF	(Netherlands) NED	Hans Hateboer	19	2	17	1	2	1
42	DF	(Italy) ITA	Giorgio Scalvini	34	2	29+3	2	2	0
77	DF	(Italy) ITA	Davide Zappacosta	21	4	18+3	4	0	0
93	DF	(France) FRA	Brandon Soppy	16	0	8+7	0	0+1	0
Midfielders
7	MF	(Netherlands) NED	Teun Koopmeiners	35	10	32+1	10	2	0
13	MF	(Brazil) BRA	Éderson	37	1	25+10	1	1+1	0
15	MF	(Netherlands) NED	Marten de Roon	37	3	34+1	3	1+1	0
88	MF	(Croatia) CRO	Mario Pašalić	33	5	24+8	5	1	0
Forwards
9	FW	(Colombia) COL	Luis Muriel	31	3	10+19	3	0+2	0
10	FW	(Ivory Coast) CIV	Jérémie Boga	25	2	5+18	2	2	0
11	FW	(Nigeria) NGR	Ademola Lookman	33	15	20+11	13	1+1	2
17	FW	(Denmark) DEN	Rasmus Højlund	34	10	20+12	9	0+2	1
23	FW	(Czech Republic) CZE	Lukáš Vorlický	3	0	0+3	0	0	0
48	FW	(Italy) ITA	Tommaso De Nipoti	1	0	0+1	0	0	0
91	FW	(Colombia) COL	Duván Zapata	22	2	9+11	2	2	0
Players transferred out during the season
18	MF	(Ukraine) UKR	Ruslan Malinovskyi	15	1	5+10	1	0	0
21	DF	(Italy) ITA	Nadir Zortea	10	1	1+8	1	0+1	0

Source: Competitions

=== Goalscorers ===
Rank	No.	Pos.	Nat.	Player	Serie A	Coppa Italia	Total
1	11	FW	(Nigeria)	Ademola Lookman	13	2	15
2	7	MF	(Netherlands)	Teun Koopmeiners	10	0	10
2	17	FW	(Denmark)	Rasmus Højlund	9	1	10
4	88	MF	(Croatia)	Mario Pašalić	5	0	5
5	77	DF	(Italy)	Davide Zappacosta	4	0	4
6	3	DF	(Denmark)	Joakim Mæhle	3	0	3
6	9	FW	(Colombia)	Luis Muriel	3	0	3
6	15	MF	(Netherlands)	Marten de Roon	3	0	3
9	2	DF	(Italy)	Rafael Tolói	2	0	2
9	10	FW	(Ivory Coast)	Jérémie Boga	2	0	2
9	33	DF	(Netherlands)	Hans Hateboer	1	1	2
9	42	DF	(Italy)	Giorgio Scalvini	2	0	2
9	91	FW	(Colombia)	Duván Zapata	2	0	2
14	6	DF	(Argentina)	José Luis Palomino	1	0	1
14	13	MF	(Brazil)	Éderson	1	0	1
14	18	MF	(Ukraine)	Ruslan Malinovskyi	1	0	1
14	21	DF	(Italy)	Nadir Zortea	1	0	1
14	28	DF	(Turkey)	Merih Demiral	1	0	1
Own goal					2	1	3
Totals					66	5	71
