= 2020–21 Atalanta BC season =

Atalanta
2020–21 season
- President: Antonio Percassi
- Head coach: Gian Piero Gasperini
- Stadium: Gewiss Stadium
- Serie A: 3rd
- Coppa Italia: Runners-up
- UEFA Champions League: Round of 16
- Top goalscorer: League: Luis Muriel (22); All: Luis Muriel (26)
- Biggest win: Atalanta 5–0 Bologna
- Biggest defeat: Atalanta 0–5 Liverpool
Home colours	Away colours	Third colours

The 2020–21 season was the 113th season in the existence of Atalanta BC and the club's 10th consecutive season in the top flight of Italian football. In addition to the domestic league, Atalanta participated in this season's editions of the Coppa Italia and the UEFA Champions League. The season covered the period from 13 August 2020 to 30 June 2021.

== Players ==
=== First-team squad ===
As of 1 February 2021

Note: Flags indicate national team as defined under FIFA eligibility rules; some limited exceptions apply. Players may hold more than one non-FIFA nationality.

No.	Pos.	Nation	Player
1	GK	SRB	Boris Radunović
2	DF	ITA	Rafael Tolói (captain)
3	DF	DEN	Joakim Mæhle
4	DF	CRO	Boško Šutalo
6	DF	ARG	José Luis Palomino
7	FW	NED	Sam Lammers
8	DF	GER	Robin Gosens
9	FW	COL	Luis Muriel
11	MF	SUI	Remo Freuler (vice-captain)
13	DF	ITA	Mattia Caldara (on loan from Milan)
15	MF	NED	Marten de Roon (3rd captain)
17	DF	ARG	Cristian Romero (on loan from Juventus)
18	MF	UKR	Ruslan Malinovskyi

No.	Pos.	Nation	Player
19	DF	ALB	Berat Djimsiti
20	MF	UKR	Viktor Kovalenko
31	GK	ITA	Francesco Rossi
32	MF	ITA	Matteo Pessina
33	DF	NED	Hans Hateboer
40	DF	ITA	Matteo Ruggeri
57	GK	ITA	Marco Sportiello
59	MF	RUS	Aleksei Miranchuk
72	FW	SLO	Josip Iličić
88	MF	CRO	Mario Pašalić
91	FW	COL	Duván Zapata
95	GK	ITA	Pierluigi Gollini

== Transfers ==
=== In ===
No.	Pos	Player	Transferred from	Fee	Date	Notes	Source
88	MF	(Croatia) Mario Pašalić	Chelsea	€15M	22 June 2020	Option to buy activated	
59	MF	(Russia) Aleksei Miranchuk	Lokomotiv Moscow	€14.5M	28 August 2020		
7	FW	(Netherlands) Sam Lammers	PSV Eindhoven	€9M	22 September 2020		
3	DF	(Denmark) Joakim Mæhle	Genk	€10M	4 January 2021		
20	MF	(Ukraine) Viktor Kovalenko	Shakhtar Donetsk	€0.7M	1 February 2021		

==== Loans in ====
No.	Pos	Player	Transferred from	Fee	Date	Notes	Source
17	DF	(Argentina) Cristian Romero	Juventus	€2M	5 September 2020	Loan with an option to buy	
21	DF	(Italy) Cristiano Piccini	Valencia		9 September 2020	Loan with an option to buy	
26	DF	(Colombia) Johan Mojica	Girona	€0.5M	22 September 2020	Loan with an option to buy	
27	DF	(Italy) Fabio Depaoli	Sampdoria		2 October 2020	Loan with an option to buy	

=== Out ===
No.	Pos	Player	Transferred to	Fee	Date	Notes	Source
21	DF	(Belgium) Timothy Castagne	Leicester City	€25M	1 September 2020		
79	FW	(Ivory Coast) Amad	Manchester United	€40M	7 January 2021		
26	DF	(Colombia) Johan Mojica	Girona		15 January 2021	Loan terminated early	
21	DF	(Italy) Cristiano Piccini	Valencia		23 January 2021	Loan terminated early	
27	DF	(Italy) Fabio Depaoli	Sampdoria		26 January 2021	Loan terminated early	
10	FW	(Argentina) Alejandro Gómez	Sevilla		26 January 2021		

==== Loans out ====
No.	Pos	Player	Transferred to	Fee	Date	Notes	Source
7	DF	(Germany) Lennart Czyborra	Genoa	€5.5M	9 September 2020	Two-year loan with obligation to buy	
20	MF	(Italy) Jacopo Da Riva	Vicenza		5 October 2020		
24	GK	(Italy) Marco Carnesecchi	Cremonese		5 January 2021		

== Pre-season and friendlies ==
Win Draw Loss Fixtures

12 September 2020 Friendly	Atalanta (Italy)	4–1	(Italy) Pro Sesto	Ciserano, Italy
15:00 CEST (UTC+2)				Stadium: Centro Sportivo Bortolotti; Attendance: 0

16 September 2020 Friendly	Atalanta (Italy)	3–1	(Italy) Novara	Ciserano, Italy
15:00 CEST (UTC+2)				Stadium: Centro Sportivo Bortolotti; Attendance: 0

19 September 2020 Friendly	Atalanta (Italy)	5–1	(Italy) Como	Ciserano, Italy
15:00 CEST (UTC+2)				Stadium: Centro Sportivo Bortolotti; Attendance: 0

19 September 2020 Friendly	Atalanta (Italy)	3–1	(Italy) Ravenna	Ciserano, Italy
18:00 CEST (UTC+2)				Stadium: Centro Sportivo Bortolotti; Attendance: 0

== Competitions ==
=== Overview ===
Competition	First match	Last match	Starting round	Final position	Record							
Competition	First match	Last match	Starting round	Final position	Pld	W	D	L	GF	GA	GD	Win %
Serie A	26 September 2020	23 May 2021	Matchday 1	3rd	38	23	9	6	90	47	+43	60.53
Coppa Italia	14 January 2021	19 May 2021	Round of 16	Runners-up	5	3	1	1	10	6	+4	60.00
Champions League	21 October 2020	16 March 2021	Group stage	Round of 16	8	3	2	3	11	12	−1	37.50
Total					51	29	12	10	111	65	+46	56.86

Last updated: 23 May 2021
Source: Soccerway

=== Serie A ===
==== League table ====
Pos	Team	Pld	W	D	L	GF	GA	GD	Pts	Qualification or relegation
1	Inter Milan (C)	38	28	7	3	89	35	+54	91	Qualification for Champions League group stage
2	Milan	38	24	7	7	74	41	+33	79	Qualification for Champions League group stage
3	Atalanta	38	23	9	6	90	47	+43	78 (Note: Atalanta finished ahead of Juventus on head-to-head points: Juventus 1–1 Atalanta, Atalanta 1–0 Juventus.)	Qualification for Champions League group stage
4	Juventus	38	23	9	6	77	38	+39	78	Qualification for Champions League group stage
5	Napoli	38	24	5	9	86	41	+45	77	Qualification for Europa League group stage (Note: Since the winners of the 2020–21 Coppa Italia, Juventus, qualified for the Champions League, the Europa League berth awarded to the Coppa Italia winners was passed to the sixth-placed team, and the Europa Conference League berth awarded to the sixth-placed team was passed to the seventh-placed team.)

Source: Serie A, Soccerway
Rules for classification: 1) Points; 2) Head-to-head points; 3) Head-to-head goal difference; 4) Goal difference; 5) Goals scored; 6) Draw. (Note: Head-to-head record is used only after all the matches between the teams in question have been played)
(C) Champions

==== Results summary ====
Overall								Home						Away					
Pld	W	D	L	GF	GA	GD	Pts	W	D	L	GF	GA	GD	W	D	L	GF	GA	GD
38	23	9	6	90	47	+43	78	12	3	4	49	24	+25	11	6	2	41	23	+18

Last updated: 23 May 2021.
Source: Serie A

==== Results by round ====
Round	1	2	3	4	5	6	7	8	9	10	11	12	13	14	15	16	17	18	19	20	21	22	23	24	25	26	27	28	29	30	31	32	33	34	35	36	37	38
Ground	A	A	H	A	H	A	H	A	H	A	H	A	H	A	H	H	A	H	A	H	H	A	H	A	H	A	H	A	H	A	H	A	H	A	A	H	A	H
Result	W	W	W	L	L	W	D	D	L	D	W	D	W	D	W	W	W	D	W	L	D	W	W	W	W	L	W	W	W	W	W	D	W	D	W	W	W	L
Position	9	2	1	3	6	4	6	7	8	9	8	8	7	7	7	7	5	6	5	7	7	6	5	4	4	5	4	4	3	4	3	3	2	2	2	2	2	3

Updated to match(es) played on 23 May 2021. Source: Serie A
A = Away; H = Home; W = Win; D = Draw; L = Loss

==== Matches ====
The league fixtures were announced on 2 September 2020.

26 September 2020 2	Torino	2–4	Atalanta	Turin
15:00 CEST (UTC+2)	Belotti 11', 43'; Zaza (yellow card) 39'	Report	Gómez 13'; Muriel 21'; Caldara (yellow card) 30'; Hateboer 42'; De Roon 54'; Freuler (yellow card) 87'	Stadium: Stadio Olimpico Grande Torino; Referee: Massimiliano Irrati

30 September 2020 1	Lazio	1–4	Atalanta	Rome
20:45 CEST (UTC+2)	Marušić (yellow card) 12'; Luis Alberto (yellow card) 26'; Lucas (yellow card) 40'; Caicedo 57', (yellow card) 75'; Cataldi (yellow card) 70'; Acerbi (yellow card) 72'; Immobile (yellow card) 90+4'	Report	Gosens 10'; Djimsiti (yellow card) 17'; Freuler (yellow card) 26'; Hateboer 32'; Gómez 41', 61'	Stadium: Stadio Olimpico; Referee: Fabio Maresca
Note: The match was originally scheduled for 20 September 2020, but was postponed due to Atalanta's involvement in the knockout phase of the UEFA Champions League.

4 October 2020 3	Atalanta	5–2	Cagliari	Bergamo
12:30 CEST (UTC+2)	Muriel 7'; Gómez 29'; Pašalić 37'; Zapata 42'; Lammers 81'	Report	Godín 24'; João Pedro 52'	Stadium: Gewiss Stadium; Referee: Fabrizio Pasqua

17 October 2020 4	Napoli	4–1	Atalanta	Naples
15:00 CEST (UTC+2)	Lozano 23', 27', (yellow card) 79'; Politano 30'; Osimhen 43'	Report	Tolói (yellow card) 38'; Gosens (yellow card) 45+1'; Lammers 69'; Djimsiti (yellow card) 81'	Stadium: Stadio San Paolo; Referee: Marco Di Bello

24 October 2020 5	Atalanta	1–3	Sampdoria	Bergamo
15:00 CEST (UTC+2)	Mojica (yellow card) 44'; Malinovskyi (yellow card) 66'; Zapata 80' (pen.); Palomino (yellow card) 86'	Report	Quagliarella 13', (penalty missed) 45; Tonelli (yellow card) 31'; Yoshida (yellow card) 47'; Thorsby 59'; Keita (yellow card) 69'; Jankto (yellow card) 71', (goal) 90+2'	Stadium: Gewiss Stadium; Referee: Gianpaolo Calvarese

31 October 2020 6	Crotone	1–2	Atalanta	Crotone
15:00 CET (UTC+1)	Simy 40'; Marrone (yellow card) 49'	Report	Muriel 26', 38'; Hateboer (yellow card) 37'; Tolói (yellow card) 62'; Romero (yellow card) 70'	Stadium: Stadio Ezio Scida; Attendance: 0 Referee: Federico Dionisi

8 November 2020 7	Atalanta	1–1	Internazionale	Bergamo
15:00 CET (UTC+1)	Djimsiti (yellow card) 33'; Miranchuk 79'	Report	Martínez (yellow card) 30', (goal) 59'; De Vrij (yellow card) 44'; Vidal (yellow card) 70'	Stadium: Gewiss Stadium; Attendance: 0 Referee: Daniele Doveri

21 November 2020 8	Spezia	0–0	Atalanta	Cesena
18:00 CET (UTC+1)	Ricci (yellow card) 3'; Estévez (yellow card) 28'; Terzi (yellow card) 65'	Report	Gosens (yellow card) 38'; Pašalić (yellow card) 52'; Pessina (yellow card) 85'	Stadium: Stadio Dino Manuzzi; Attendance: 0 Referee: Antonio Rapuano

28 November 2020 9	Atalanta	0–2	Hellas Verona	Bergamo
20:45 CET (UTC+1)	Tolói (yellow card) 60'; Amad (yellow card) 80'	Report	Ceccherini (yellow card) 39'; Dawidowicz (yellow card) 45'; Veloso 62' (pen.), (yellow card) 81'; Zaccagni 83'	Stadium: Gewiss Stadium; Attendance: 0 Referee: Davide Massa

13 December 2020 11	Atalanta	3–0	Fiorentina	Bergamo
15:00 CET (UTC+1)	Gosens 44'; Malinovskyi 55'; Tolói 63'; Romero (yellow card) 67'	Report	Amrabat (yellow card) 54'; Ribéry (yellow card) 80'	Stadium: Gewiss Stadium; Attendance: 0 Referee: Maurizio Mariani

16 December 2020 12	Juventus	1–1	Atalanta	Turin
18:30 CET (UTC+1)	Chiesa 29'; Rabiot (yellow card) 46'; Morata (yellow card) 60'; Ronaldo (penalty missed) 61'; McKennie (yellow card) 80'	Report	Romero (yellow card) 38'; De Roon (yellow card) 52'; Freuler 57'	Stadium: Allianz Stadium; Attendance: 0 Referee: Daniele Doveri

20 December 2020 13	Atalanta	4–1	Roma	Bergamo
18:00 CET (UTC+1)	Malinovskyi (yellow card) 37'; Romero (yellow card) 39'; Zapata 59'; Gosens 70'; Muriel 72'; Iličić 85'	Report	Džeko 3'; Pellegrini (yellow card) 36'; Mirante (yellow card) 57'; Mancini (yellow card) 64'	Stadium: Gewiss Stadium; Attendance: 0 Referee: Marco Di Bello

23 December 2020 14	Bologna	2–2	Atalanta	Bologna
20:45 CET (UTC+1)	Tomiyasu 73'; Paz 82'; Palacio (yellow card) 84'; Da Costa (yellow card) 86'	Report	Gosens (yellow card) 18'; Muriel 22' (pen.), 23'; Djimsiti (yellow card) 60'	Stadium: Stadio Renato Dall'Ara; Attendance: 0 Referee: Daniele Chiffi

3 January 2021 15	Atalanta	5–1	Sassuolo	Bergamo
15:00 CET (UTC+1)	Zapata 11', 49'; Hateboer (yellow card) 25'; Romero (yellow card) 44'; Pessina 45'; Gosens 57'; Muriel 68'; De Roon (yellow card) 80'	Report	Chiricheș (yellow card) 51', (goal) 75'	Stadium: Gewiss Stadium; Attendance: 0 Referee: Fabio Maresca

6 January 2021 16	Atalanta	3–0	Parma	Bergamo
15:00 CET (UTC+1)	Muriel 15'; Pessina (yellow card) 45'; Zapata 49'; Gosens 61'	Report	Cyprien (yellow card) 39'	Stadium: Gewiss Stadium; Attendance: 0 Referee: Juan Luca Sacchi

9 January 2021 17	Benevento	1–4	Atalanta	Benevento
15:00 CET (UTC+1)	Foulon (yellow card) 24'; Sau 50'; Lapadula (yellow card) 53'; Dabo (yellow card) 57'	Report	De Roon (yellow card) 17'; Palomino (yellow card) 26'; Iličić 30'; Tolói 69'; Zapata 71'; Muriel 86'	Stadium: Stadio Ciro Vigorito; Attendance: 0 Referee: Gianluca Manganiello

17 January 2021 18	Atalanta	0–0	Genoa	Bergamo
18:00 CET (UTC+1)	Gosens (yellow card) 83'	Report	Goldaniga (yellow card) 72'; Zappacosta (yellow card) 75'	Stadium: Gewiss Stadium; Attendance: 0 Referee: Livio Marinelli

20 January 2021 10	Udinese	1–1	Atalanta	Udine
15:00 CET (UTC+1)	Pereyra 1', (yellow card) 11'; Zeegelaar (yellow card) 75'; Bonifazi (yellow card) 90+2'	Report	Muriel 44'; Freuler (yellow card) 83'; Romero (yellow card) 90+3'	Stadium: Stadio Friuli; Attendance: 0 Referee: Gianpaolo Calvarese
Note: The match was originally scheduled for 6 December 2020, but was postponed due to a waterlogged pitch.

23 January 2021 19	Milan	0–3	Atalanta	Milan
18:00 CET (UTC+1)	Hernandez (yellow card) 38'; Kessié (yellow card) 51'	Report	Romero 26'; Iličić 53' (pen.); Zapata 77'; Gosens (yellow card) 84'	Stadium: San Siro; Attendance: 0 Referee: Maurizio Mariani

31 January 2021 20	Atalanta	1–3	Lazio	Bergamo
15:00 CET (UTC+1)	Pašalić 79'	Report	Marušić 3'; Patric (yellow card) 23'; Correa 51'; Musacchio (yellow card) 58'; Muriqi 82'	Stadium: Gewiss Stadium; Attendance: 0 Referee: Daniele Chiffi

6 February 2021 21	Atalanta	3–3	Torino	Bergamo
15:00 CET (UTC+1)	Iličić 14'; Gosens 19'; Muriel 21'; Palomino (yellow card) 41'; Pašalić (yellow card) 86'; Tolói (yellow card) 87'	Report	Zaza (yellow card) 24'; Nkoulou (yellow card) 27'; Belotti (penalty missed) 42', 42'; Bremer 45+1'; Bonazzoli 84'	Stadium: Gewiss Stadium; Attendance: 0 Referee: Francesco Fourneau

14 February 2021 22	Cagliari	0–1	Atalanta	Cagliari
15:00 CET (UTC+1)	Walukiewicz (yellow card) 7'; Rugani (yellow card) 60'; Lykogiannis (yellow card) 69'	Report	Romero (yellow card) 45+1'; Iličić (yellow card) 68'; De Roon (yellow card) 89'; Muriel 90'	Stadium: Sardegna Arena; Attendance: 0 Referee: Marco Piccinini

21 February 2021 23	Atalanta	4–2	Napoli	Bergamo
18:00 CET (UTC+1)	Zapata 52'; Djimsiti (yellow card) 55'; Gosens 64', (yellow card) 87'; Muriel 71'; Romero 79'	Report	Di Lorenzo (yellow card) 6'; Zieliński 58'; Gosens 76' (o.g.)	Stadium: Gewiss Stadium; Attendance: 0 Referee: Marco Di Bello

28 February 2021 24	Sampdoria	0–2	Atalanta	Genoa
12:30 CET (UTC+1)	Ekdal (yellow card) 63'	Report	Freuler (yellow card) 10'; Malinovskyi 40'; Tolói (yellow card) 47'; Gosens 70'; De Roon (yellow card) 81'	Stadium: Stadio Luigi Ferraris; Attendance: 0 Referee: Livio Marinelli

3 March 2021 25	Atalanta	5–1	Crotone	Bergamo
20:45 CET (UTC+1)	Gosens 12'; Palomino 48'; Muriel 50'; Iličić 58'; Miranchuk 85'	Report	Magallán (yellow card) 7'; Simy 23'; Rivière (yellow card) 27'	Stadium: Gewiss Stadium; Attendance: 0 Referee: Simone Sozza

8 March 2021 26	Internazionale	1–0	Atalanta	Milan
20:45 CET (UTC+1)	Škriniar 54'	Report	Romero (yellow card) 59'	Stadium: San Siro; Attendance: 0 Referee: Maurizio Mariani

12 March 2021 27	Atalanta	3–1	Spezia	Bergamo
20:45 CET (UTC+1)	Tolói (yellow card) 8'; De Roon (yellow card) 25'; Pašalić 53', 73'; Muriel 55'	Report	Piccoli 82'	Stadium: Gewiss Stadium; Attendance: 0 Referee: Valerio Marini

21 March 2021 28	Hellas Verona	0–2	Atalanta	Verona
12:30 CET (UTC+1)	Ceccherini (yellow card) 27'; Dawidowicz (yellow card) 28'; Sturaro (yellow card) 72'	Report	Malinovskyi 33' (pen.); Zapata 42'; Tolói (yellow card) 60'; Romero (yellow card) 64'	Stadium: Stadio Marcantonio Bentegodi; Attendance: 0 Referee: Luca Pairetto

3 April 2021 29	Atalanta	3–2	Udinese	Bergamo
15:00 CEST (UTC+2)	Muriel 19', 43'; Zapata 61'	Report	Pereyra 45', (yellow card) 58'; Stryger Larsen 71'; Samir (yellow card) 90'	Stadium: Gewiss Stadium; Attendance: 0 Referee: Gianluca Manganiello

11 April 2021 30	Fiorentina	2–3	Atalanta	Florence
20:45 CEST (UTC+2)	Pezzella (yellow card) 32'; Amrabat (yellow card) 53'; Vlahović 57', 66'; Milenković (yellow card) 72'	Report	Zapata 13', 40'; Romero (yellow card) 23'; Iličić 70' (pen.)	Stadium: Stadio Artemio Franchi; Attendance: 0 Referee: Juan Luca Sacchi

18 April 2021 31	Atalanta	1–0	Juventus	Bergamo
15:00 CEST (UTC+2)	Gosens (yellow card) 79'; Malinovskyi (yellow card) 79', (goal) 87'; Djimsiti (yellow card) 82'	Report	Bonucci (yellow card) 73'; Cuadrado (yellow card) 90+3'	Stadium: Gewiss Stadium; Attendance: 0 Referee: Daniele Orsato

22 April 2021 32	Roma	1–1	Atalanta	Rome
18:30 CEST (UTC+2)	Calafiori (yellow card) 31'; Villar (yellow card) 47'; Cristante 75'; Ibañez (yellow card) 90+4' (yellow-red card) 90+5'	Report	Malinovskyi 26'; Gosens (yellow card) 52' (yellow-red card) 69'	Stadium: Stadio Olimpico; Attendance: 0 Referee: Gianpaolo Calvarese

25 April 2021 33	Atalanta	5–0	Bologna	Bergamo
20:45 CEST (UTC+2)	Malinovskyi 22'; Muriel 44' (pen.); Freuler 57'; Zapata 59'; Miranchuk 73'	Report	Danilo (yellow card) 44'; Schouten (red card) 49'	Stadium: Gewiss Stadium; Attendance: 0 Referee: Michael Fabbri

2 May 2021 34	Sassuolo	1–1	Atalanta	Reggio Emilia
15:00 CEST (UTC+2)	Marlon (yellow card) 28' (yellow-red card) 75'; Chiricheș (yellow card) 35'; Locatelli (yellow card) 40'; Obiang (yellow card) 45+1'; Berardi 52' (pen.); Ferrari (yellow card) 53'	Report	Gollini (red card) 23'; Gosens 32'; Muriel (penalty missed) 76'; Djimsiti (yellow card) 78'	Stadium: Mapei Stadium; Attendance: 0 Referee: Luca Pairetto

9 May 2021 35	Parma	2–5	Atalanta	Parma
15:00 CEST (UTC+2)	Grassi (yellow card) 44'; Brunetta 78'; Sohm 88'	Report	Malinovskyi 12'; Pessina 52'; Hateboer (yellow card) 72'; Muriel 77', 86'; Miranchuk 90+3'	Stadium: Stadio Ennio Tardini; Attendance: 0 Referee: Antonio Giua

12 May 2021 36	Atalanta	2–0	Benevento	Bergamo
20:45 CEST (UTC+2)	Muriel 22'; De Roon (yellow card) 51'; Pašalić 67'; Iličić (yellow card) 81'	Report	Tuia (yellow card) 40'; Barba (yellow card) 56'; Ioniță (yellow card) 60'; Caldirola (yellow card) 80' (yellow-red card) 82'	Stadium: Gewiss Stadium; Attendance: 0 Referee: Davide Massa

15 May 2021 37	Genoa	3–4	Atalanta	Genoa
15:00 CEST (UTC+2)	Shomurodov 48', 84'; Pandev 67' (pen.); Rovella (yellow card) 88'	Report	Zapata 9'; Malinovskyi 26'; Gosens 44'; Pašalić 51'; Djimsiti (yellow card) 62'; Tolói (yellow card) 71'	Stadium: Stadio Luigi Ferraris; Attendance: 0 Referee: Livio Marinelli

23 May 2021 38	Atalanta	0–2	Milan	Bergamo
20:45 CEST (UTC+2)	Freuler (yellow card) 47'; De Roon (yellow card) 69', (red card) 90+1'; Tolói (yellow card) 86'	Report	Kessié 43' (pen.), 90+2' (pen.); Mandžukić (yellow card) 82'; Krunić (yellow card) 90+1'; Dalot (yellow card) 90+2'	Stadium: Gewiss Stadium; Attendance: 0 Referee: Maurizio Mariani

=== Coppa Italia ===
14 January 2021 Round of 16	Atalanta	3–1	Cagliari	Bergamo
21:15 CET (UTC+1)	Miranchuk 43'; Muriel 61'; Šutalo 64'; Iličić (yellow card) 80'	Report	Sottil 55'	Stadium: Gewiss Stadium; Referee: Federico Dionisi

27 January 2021 Quarter-finals	Atalanta	3–2	Lazio	Bergamo
17:45 CET (UTC+1)	Djimsiti 7'; Romero (yellow card) 11'; Malinovskyi (yellow card) 16', (goal) 37'; Palomino (red card) 53'; Miranchuk 57'; Zapata (penalty missed) 66'	Report	Muriqi 17'; Patric (yellow card) 22'; Farès (yellow card) 22'; Acerbi 34'; Escalante (yellow card) 57'	Stadium: Gewiss Stadium; Referee: Luca Pairetto

3 February 2021 Semi-finals; First leg	Napoli	0–0	Atalanta	Naples
20:45 CET (UTC+1)	Koulibaly (yellow card) 88'	Report	Romero (yellow card) 64'	Stadium: Stadio San Paolo; Referee: Michael Fabbri

10 February 2021 Semi-finals; Second leg	Atalanta	3–1 (3–1 agg.)	Napoli	Bergamo
20:45 CET (UTC+1)	Palomino (yellow card) 7'; Zapata 10'; Pessina 16', 78'	Report	Hysaj (yellow card) 25'; Lozano 53'; Zieliński (yellow card) 57'; Di Lorenzo (yellow card) 75'; Insigne (yellow card) 90+2'	Stadium: Gewiss Stadium; Referee: Federico La Penna

19 May 2021 Final	Atalanta	1–2	Juventus	Reggio Emilia
21:00 CEST (UTC+2)	Malinovskyi (yellow card) 36', (goal) 41'; Romero (yellow card) 78'; Freuler (yellow card) 85'; De Roon (yellow card) 88'; Tolói (red card) 88'; Iličić (yellow card) 89'	Report	Chiellini (yellow card) 27'; Kulusevski 31'; De Ligt (yellow card) 40'; Chiesa 73'	Stadium: Mapei Stadium – Città del Tricolore; Attendance: 4,200; Referee: Davide Massa
Note: Toloi was sent off for dissent while on the bench.

=== UEFA Champions League ===
==== Group stage ====
The group stage draw was held on 1 October 2020.

Pos	Team	Pld	W	D	L	GF	GA	GD	Pts	Qualification	LIV	ATA	AJX	MID
1	(England) Liverpool	6	4	1	1	10	3	+7	13	Advance to knockout phase	—	0–2	1–0	2–0
2	(Italy) Atalanta	6	3	2	1	10	8	+2	11	Advance to knockout phase	0–5	—	2–2	1–1
3	(Netherlands) Ajax	6	2	1	3	7	7	0	7	Transfer to Europa League	0–1	0–1	—	3–1
4	(Denmark) Midtjylland	6	0	2	4	4	13	−9	2		1–1	0–4	1–2	—

Source: UEFA
Rules for classification: Group stage tiebreakers

21 October 2020 1	Midtjylland (Denmark)	0–4	(Italy) Atalanta	Herning, Denmark
21:00 CEST (UTC+2)	Sisto (yellow card) 74'	Report	Zapata 26'; Gómez 36'; Muriel 42'; Romero (yellow card) 84'; Miranchuk 89'	Stadium: MCH Arena; Attendance: 132; Referee: Artur Soares Dias (Portugal)

27 October 2020 2	Atalanta (Italy)	2–2	(Netherlands) Ajax	Bergamo, Italy
21:00 CET (UTC+1)	Iličić (yellow card) 23'; Zapata 54', 60'; Djimsiti (yellow card) 66'; Malinovskyi (yellow card) 90+1'	Report	Traoré (yellow card) 6', (goal) 38'; Klaassen (yellow card) 20'; Mazraoui (yellow card) 25'; Tadić 30' (pen.)	Stadium: Stadio Atleti Azzurri d'Italia; Attendance: 0 (Note: Due to the COVID-19 pandemic in Europe, the match was played behind closed doors.); Referee: Damir Skomina (Slovenia)

3 November 2020 3	Atalanta (Italy)	0–5	(England) Liverpool	Bergamo, Italy
21:00 CET (UTC+1)		Report	Jota 16', 33', 54'; Wijnaldum (yellow card) 21'; Jones (yellow card) 21'; Salah 47'; Mané 49'	Stadium: Stadio Atleti Azzurri d'Italia; Attendance: 0 Referee: Ovidiu Hațegan (Romania)

25 November 2020 4	Liverpool (England)	0–2	(Italy) Atalanta	Liverpool, England
21:00 CET (UTC+1)	Tsimikas (yellow card) 58'	Report	Iličić 60'; Gosens 64'; De Roon (yellow card) 89'	Stadium: Anfield; Attendance: 0 Referee: Carlos del Cerro Grande (Spain)

1 December 2020 5	Atalanta (Italy)	1–1	(Denmark) Midtjylland	Bergamo, Italy
21:00 CET (UTC+1)	Djimsiti (yellow card) 30'; Romero (yellow card) 62', (goal) 79'	Report	Scholz 13'; Kaba (yellow card) 28'; Paulinho (yellow card) 89'	Stadium: Stadio Atleti Azzurri d'Italia; Attendance: 0 Referee: Anastasios Sidiropoulos (Greece)

9 December 2020 6	Ajax (Netherlands)	0–1	(Italy) Atalanta	Amsterdam, Netherlands
18:55 CET (UTC+1)	Gravenberch (yellow card) 22' (yellow-red card) 79'; Tagliafico (yellow card) 52'	Report	Hateboer (yellow card) 60'; Freuler (yellow card) 82'; Muriel 85'	Stadium: Johan Cruyff Arena; Attendance: 0 Referee: Carlos del Cerro Grande (Spain)

==== Knockout phase ====
===== Round of 16 =====
The draw for the round of 16 was held on 14 December 2020.

24 February 2021 First leg	Atalanta (Italy)	0–1	(Spain) Real Madrid	Bergamo, Italy
21:00 CET (UTC+1)	Freuler (red card) 17'; Gosens (yellow card) 71'	Report	Casemiro (yellow card) 23'; Mendy (yellow card) 55', (goal) 86'	Stadium: Stadio Atleti Azzurri d'Italia; Attendance: 0 Referee: Tobias Stieler (Germany)

16 March 2021 Second leg	Real Madrid (Spain)	3–1 (4–1 agg.)	(Italy) Atalanta	Madrid, Spain
21:00 CET (UTC+1)	Benzema 34'; Valverde (yellow card) 39'; Ramos 60' (pen.); Nacho (yellow card) 73'; Kroos (yellow card) 77'; Asensio 84'	Report	Tolói (yellow card) 58'; Muriel 83'	Stadium: Alfredo Di Stéfano (Note: Real Madrid played their home matches at Alfredo di Stéfano, Madrid, instead of their regular home stadium Santiago Bernabéu, Madrid.); Attendance: 0 Referee: Danny Makkelie (Netherlands)

== Statistics ==
=== Appearances and goals ===
No.	Pos	Nat	Player	Total		Serie A		Coppa Italia		Champions League	
No.	Pos	Nat	Player	Apps	Goals	Apps	Goals	Apps	Goals	Apps	Goals
Goalkeepers
1	GK	(Serbia) SRB	Boris Radunović	0	0	0	0	0	0	0	0
25	GK	(Italy) ITA	Ludovico Gelmi (Note: Aggregated to the first team from the Primavera (youth) team)	0	0	0	0	0	0	0	0
31	GK	(Italy) ITA	Francesco Rossi	0	0	0	0	0	0	0	0
57	GK	(Italy) ITA	Marco Sportiello	21	0	13+2	0	1	0	5	0
95	GK	(Italy) ITA	Pierluigi Gollini	31	0	25	0	3	0	3	0
Defenders
2	DF	(Italy) ITA	Rafael Tolói	42	2	29+2	2	2+1	0	7+1	0
3	DF	(Denmark) DEN	Joakim Mæhle	25	0	12+8	0	3	0	2	0
4	DF	(Croatia) CRO	Boško Šutalo	9	1	3+4	0	2	1	0	0
6	DF	(Argentina) ARG	José Luis Palomino	45	1	25+11	1	2+1	0	2+4	0
8	DF	(Germany) GER	Robin Gosens	43	12	30+2	11	4	0	7	1
13	DF	(Italy) ITA	Mattia Caldara	9	0	1+5	0	0+2	0	0+1	0
17	DF	(Argentina) ARG	Cristian Romero	41	3	29+2	2	3	0	7	1
19	DF	(Albania) ALB	Berat Djimsiti	45	1	28+5	0	4	1	8	0
33	DF	(Netherlands) NED	Hans Hateboer	29	2	20+2	2	0+1	0	6	0
40	DF	(Italy) ITA	Matteo Ruggeri	8	0	3+3	0	0	0	0+2	0
41	DF	(Italy) ITA	Davide Ghislandi	1	0	0+1	0	0	0	0	0
42	DF	(Italy) ITA	Giorgio Scalvini	0	0	0	0	0	0	0	0
Midfielders
11	MF	(Switzerland) SUI	Remo Freuler	45	2	32+2	2	4	0	7	0
15	MF	(Netherlands) NED	Marten de Roon	45	1	33+2	1	2+2	0	5+1	0
18	MF	(Ukraine) UKR	Ruslan Malinovskyi	42	10	22+14	8	2	2	1+3	0
20	MF	(Ukraine) UKR	Viktor Kovalenko	1	0	0+1	0	0	0	0	0
32	MF	(Italy) ITA	Matteo Pessina	39	4	21+7	2	4	2	5+2	0
43	MF	(Italy) ITA	Simone Panada	0	0	0	0	0	0	0	0
44	MF	(Italy) ITA	Emmanuel Gyabuaa	1	0	0+1	0	0	0	0	0
59	MF	(Russia) RUS	Aleksei Miranchuk	30	7	4+21	4	2	2	0+3	1
77	MF	(Italy) ITA	Alessandro Cortinovis	0	0	0	0	0	0	0	0
88	MF	(Croatia) CRO	Mario Pašalić	32	6	10+15	6	0+2	0	3+2	0
Forwards
7	FW	(Netherlands) NED	Sam Lammers	17	2	1+14	2	0+1	0	0+1	0
9	FW	(Colombia) COL	Luis Muriel	47	26	16+20	22	4	1	5+2	3
72	FW	(Slovenia) SLO	Josip Iličić	37	7	17+11	6	0+3	0	2+4	1
91	FW	(Colombia) COL	Duván Zapata	48	19	29+8	15	2+1	1	6+2	3
Players transferred out during the season
10	FW	(Argentina) ARG	Alejandro Gómez	16	5	9+1	4	0	0	6	1
20	MF	(Italy) ITA	Jacopo Da Riva	0	0	0	0	0	0	0	0
21	DF	(Italy) ITA	Cristiano Piccini	1	0	0+1	0	0	0	0	0
24	GK	(Italy) ITA	Marco Carnesecchi	0	0	0	0	0	0	0	0
26	DF	(Colombia) COL	Johan Mojica	13	0	3+8	0	0	0	1+1	0
27	DF	(Italy) ITA	Fabio Depaoli	7	0	3+2	0	0+1	0	0+1	0
79	FW	(Ivory Coast) CIV	Amad	2	0	0+1	0	0	0	0+1	0

Last updated: 23 May 2021
Source: Competitions

=== Goalscorers ===
As of 23 May 2021

Rank	No.	Pos	Nat	Name	Serie A	Coppa Italia	Champions League	Total
1	9	FW	(Colombia)	Luis Muriel	22	1	3	26
2	91	FW	(Colombia)	Duván Zapata	15	1	3	19
3	8	DF	(Germany)	Robin Gosens	11	0	1	12
4	18	MF	(Ukraine)	Ruslan Malinovskyi	8	2	0	10
5	59	MF	(Russia)	Aleksei Miranchuk	4	2	1	7
5	72	FW	(Slovenia)	Josip Iličić	6	0	1	7
7	88	MF	(Croatia)	Mario Pašalić	6	0	0	6
8	10	FW	(Argentina)	Alejandro Gómez	4	0	1	5
9	32	MF	(Italy)	Matteo Pessina	2	2	0	4
10	17	DF	(Argentina)	Cristian Romero	2	0	1	3
11	2	DF	(Italy)	Rafael Tolói	2	0	0	2
11	7	FW	(Netherlands)	Sam Lammers	2	0	0	2
11	11	MF	(Switzerland)	Remo Freuler	2	0	0	2
11	33	DF	(Netherlands)	Hans Hateboer	2	0	0	2
15	4	DF	(Croatia)	Boško Šutalo	0	1	0	1
15	6	DF	(Argentina)	José Luis Palomino	1	0	0	1
15	15	MF	(Netherlands)	Marten de Roon	1	0	0	1
15	19	DF	(Albania)	Berat Djimsiti	0	1	0	1
Totals					90	10	11	111
