= Matteo Pessina =

Italian footballer (born 1997)

Matteo Pessina Cavaliere OMRI
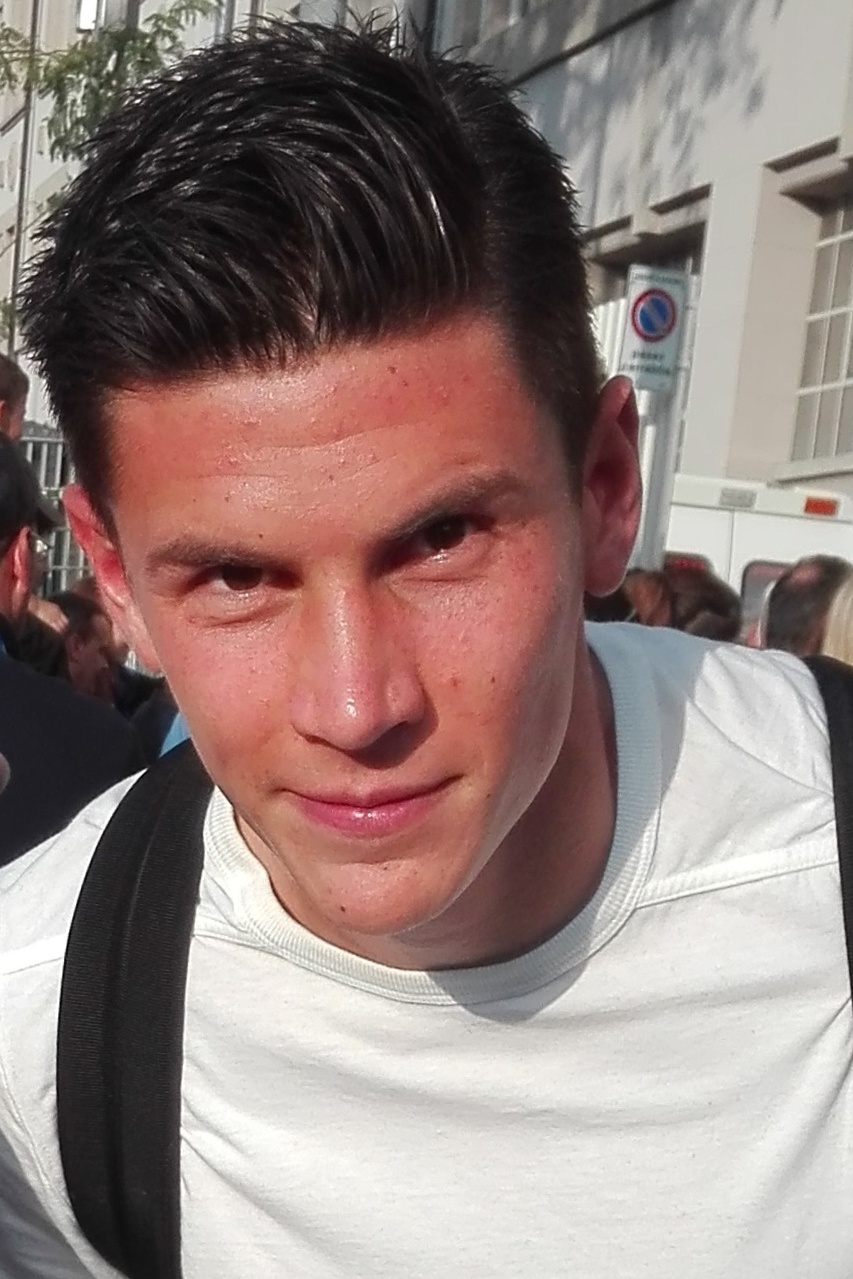
- Pessina in 2018

Personal information
- Full name: Matteo Pessina
- Date of birth: 21 April 1997 (age 29)
- Place of birth: Monza, Italy
- Height: 1.87 m (6 ft 2 in)
- Position: Midfielder

Team information
- Current team: Monza
- Number: 32

Youth career
- 2002–2007: La Dominante
- 2007–2014: Monza

Senior career*
| Years | Team | Apps | (Gls) |
| 2013–2015 | Monza | 22 | (6) |
| 2015–2017 | AC Milan | 0 | (0) |
| 2015–2016 | → Lecce (loan) | 3 | (0) |
| 2016 | → Catania (loan) | 1 | (0) |
| 2016–2017 | → Como (loan) | 36 | (9) |
| 2017–2023 | Atalanta | 67 | (3) |
| 2017–2018 | → Spezia (loan) | 38 | (2) |
| 2019–2020 | → Hellas Verona (loan) | 35 | (7) |
| 2022–2023 | → Monza (loan) | 35 | (5) |
| 2023– | Monza | 81 | (11) |

International career
| 2015–2016 | Italy U19 | 4 | (0) |
| 2016–2017 | Italy U20 | 12 | (1) |
| 2017–2018 | Italy U21 | 7 | (0) |
| 2020–2023 | Italy | 16 | (5) |
Medal record
Men's football
Representing Italy
UEFA European Championship
| Winner | 2020 Europe |
CONMEBOL–UEFA Cup of Champions
| Runner-up | 2022 England |
FIFA U-20 World Cup
| Third place | 2017 South Korea |
- * Club domestic league appearances and goals as of 8 May 2026

Matteo Pessina Cavaliere OMRI (born 21 April 1997) is an Italian professional footballer who plays as a midfielder for and captains Serie A club Monza.

Coming through the youth system, Pessina started his career at Monza. He joined AC Milan in 2015, who sent him on loan to Lecce, Catania and Como. In 2017, he moved to Atalanta and was loaned out twice to Spezia and then Hellas Verona. Pessina became a starter for Atalanta upon his return from loan in 2020. He returned to his hometown club Monza in 2022 and was made club captain.

Pessina represented Italy internationally at under-19, under-20 and under-21 levels, before making his senior debut in 2020. He was part of Italy's squad at UEFA Euro 2020, where he scored two goals to help his side win the competition.

== Club career ==
=== Monza ===
Born in Monza, Italy, Pessina began his youth career at local club La Dominante aged five. In 2007, aged 10, Pessina joined Monza's youth sector. He made his senior debut for Monza on 2 October 2013, in a Coppa Italia Lega Pro game against AlbinoLeffe.

Pessina was made a permanent member of the first team in the 2014–15 season; he made his league debut on 6 January 2015, in which he also scored a goal, against Pro Patria. Pessina finished the season with three goals in 20 appearances in the regular season of the Lega Pro, as well as three goals in two games in the relegation play-outs, won against Pordenone.

=== AC Milan ===
Despite avoiding relegation, Monza was forced to restart from the Serie D due to bankruptcy: Pessina became a free agent and was signed by AC Milan on 30 June 2015.

==== Loans to Lecce, Catania and Como ====
Pessina was promptly sent on loan to Lecce in the Lega Pro in August 2015. During the 2015–16 season, Pessina was used infrequently: he only made one appearance in the Coppa Italia Lega Pro and three in the league.

In January 2016, the loan was interrupted and Pessina was loaned out to Catania. Even in his second loan spell, he was used infrequently, playing only one league game in the second half of the season.

In summer 2016, Pessina was loaned out to Como. He played as a starter in the 2016–17 season, making two appearances in the Coppa Italia, three in the Coppa Italia Lega Pro, 35 in the league (scoring nine goals) and one in the promotion play-offs.

=== Atalanta ===
On 7 July 2017, Pessina signed a contract with Atalanta, as part of a swap deal involving Andrea Conti moving the other way.

==== Loan to Spezia ====
On 25 August 2017, Pessina was signed on loan by Serie B side Spezia. He scored his first Serie B goal against Salernitana on 23 February 2018. Due to his performances, having scored two goals in 38 appearances, Pessina was nominated Best Young Player of the Serie B at the Serie B Gran Galà Top 11.

==== Return to Atalanta ====
In summer 2018, Pessina returned to Atalanta. He made his debut on 26 July, playing the first leg of the second qualifying round of the UEFA Europa League as a starter, in a 2–2 home draw against Sarajevo; it was also his debut in UEFA club competition.

He made his Serie A debut on 20 August 2018, aged 21, replacing Mario Pašalić in the second half of the first matchday, a 4–0 home win against Frosinone. He made 19 appearances in all competitions, including five in the preliminary rounds of the Europa League and two in the Coppa Italia.

==== Loan to Hellas Verona ====
In August 2019, Pessina joined newly-promoted Serie A side Hellas Verona on loan with an option to buy. On his debut, six days later, he scored his first Serie A goal in a 1–0 win against Lecce in the second matchday. Pessina ended the 2019–20 season with seven goals in 35 league appearances.

==== Starter at Atalanta ====
After returning from loan in summer 2020, Pessina made his UEFA Champions League debut with Atalanta on 21 October, in a 4–0 win against Midtjylland. Starting from November, Pessina started finding more space in Atalanta's starting lineup; on 3 January 2021, he scored his first goal with Atalanta, in a 5–1 home win over Sassuolo. In the second leg of the Coppa Italia semi-final, he scored a brace in a 3–1 win against Napoli, which allowed Atalanta to progress to the final. On 29 September 2021, he scored the sole goal in a win against Young Boys on the second matchday of the Champions League group stage: it was his first goal in a UEFA competition.

=== Monza ===
On 6 July 2022, Pessina returned to his former club Monza, who had been promoted to the Serie A for the first time in their history; he joined on a one-year loan, with an option and conditional obligation for purchase, and was made club captain.

He made his debut on 26 August, as a substitute in a 2–1 home defeat to Udinese. On 2 October, Pessina scored his first Serie A goal for Monza in a 3–0 away win to Sampdoria.

== International career ==
=== Youth ===
Pessina was a member of the Italy U20 side that finished in third place at the 2017 FIFA U-20 World Cup. He made his debut with the U21 team on 5 October 2017, in a 6–2 friendly win against Hungary in Budapest.

=== Senior ===
Pessina was called up to the Italy senior squad by manager Roberto Mancini in November 2020, and made his senior debut for Italy on 11 November, featuring as a substitute in a 4–0 friendly win against Estonia in Florence. On 28 May 2021, Pessina scored his first goal for Italy in the 75th minute of a 7–0 home win in a friendly against San Marino; he scored a second goal in the 87th minute.

In June 2021, Pessina was included in Italy's preliminary squad for UEFA Euro 2020 to replace an injured Stefano Sensi. He made his first appearance in the tournament as a late substitute in Italy's group match against Switzerland on 16 June, a 3–0 win for Italy. He then started in the match against Wales on 20 June, scoring the only goal of the match in the team's 1–0 victory in Rome; the result allowed them to top their group. On 26 June, after coming off the bench for Nicolò Barella, Pessina scored the match-winning goal in a 2–1 extra-time win over Austria in the round of 16. Italy went on to win the title following a 3–2 penalty shoot-out victory over England at Wembley Stadium in the final after 120 minutes of play had ended in a 1–1 draw.

On 20 November 2022, Pessina came on as a substitute in a 2–0 friendly defeat to Austria, becoming Monza's first-ever national team player. He became the inaugural Biancorosso to score for the national side, netting Italy's second goal in a 2-0 win over Malta in a UEFA Euro 2024 qualifier on March 26, 2023.

== Style of play ==
Primarily an offensive-minded central midfielder, known as the mezzala role in Italian football jargon, Pessina is also capable of playing as an attacking midfielder or even as a winger. A left-footed player, he possesses good technique, and is known for his ability to create chances for teammates or make late attacking runs off the ball into the penalty area; he is also known for his defensive qualities and work-rate. In his position, he has been likened to midfielders Steven Gerrard and Frank Lampard for his surging runs and eye for goal. He has cited both English midfielders among his idols growing up.

== Personal life ==
Pessina studied economics at the LUISS Business School in Rome, Italy.

== Career statistics ==
=== Club ===
As of match played 29 May 2026

Appearances and goals by club, season and competition
| Club | Season | League | | | Coppa Italia | | Europe | | Other | | Total | |
| Club | Season | Division | Apps | Goals | Apps | Goals | Apps | Goals | Apps | Goals | Apps | Goals |
|---|---|---|---|---|---|---|---|---|---|---|---|---|
| Monza | 2013–14 | Lega Pro 2D | 0 | 0 | — | | — | | 3 (Note: Appearances in Coppa Italia Lega Pro) | 0 | 3 | 0 |
| Monza | 2014–15 | Lega Pro | 20 | 3 | 0 | 0 | — | | 3 (Note: One appearance in Coppa Italia Lega Pro, two appearances and three goals in Lega Pro relegation play-outs) | 3 | 23 | 6 |
| Monza | Total | | 20 | 3 | 0 | 0 | 0 | 0 | 6 | 3 | 26 | 6 |
| AC Milan | 2015–16 | Serie A | — | | — | | — | | — | | 0 | 0 |
| AC Milan | 2016–17 | Serie A | — | | — | | — | | — | | 0 | 0 |
| AC Milan | Total | | 0 | 0 | 0 | 0 | 0 | 0 | 0 | 0 | 0 | 0 |
| Lecce (loan) | 2015–16 | Lega Pro | 3 | 0 | — | | — | | 1 | 0 | 4 | 0 |
| Catania (loan) | 2015–16 | Lega Pro | 1 | 0 | 2 | 0 | — | | 3 | 0 | 6 | 0 |
| Como (loan) | 2016–17 | Lega Pro | 35 | 9 | 2 | 0 | — | | 4 (Note: Appearances in Lega Pro promotion play-offs) | 0 | 41 | 9 |
| Atalanta | 2017–18 | Serie A | — | | — | | — | | — | | 0 | 0 |
| Atalanta | 2018–19 | Serie A | 12 | 0 | 2 | 0 | 5 (Note: Appearances in UEFA Europa League) | 0 | — | | 19 | 0 |
| Atalanta | 2019–20 | Serie A | — | | — | | — | | — | | 0 | 0 |
| Atalanta | 2020–21 | Serie A | 28 | 2 | 5 | 2 | 7 (Note: Appearances in UEFA Champions League) | 0 | — | | 40 | 4 |
| Atalanta | 2021–22 | Serie A | 27 | 1 | 2 | 0 | 8 (Note: Four appearances and one goal in UEFA Champions League, four appearances in UEFA Europa League) | 1 | — | | 37 | 2 |
| Atalanta | Total | | 67 | 3 | 9 | 2 | 20 | 1 | 0 | 0 | 96 | 6 |
| Spezia (loan) | 2017–18 | Serie B | 38 | 2 | — | | — | | — | | 38 | 2 |
| Hellas Verona (loan) | 2019–20 | Serie A | 35 | 7 | — | | — | | — | | 35 | 7 |
| Monza (loan) | 2022–23 | Serie A | 35 | 5 | 1 | 0 | — | | — | | 36 | 5 |
| Monza | 2023–24 | Serie A | 37 | 6 | 1 | 0 | — | | — | | 38 | 6 |
| Monza | 2024–25 | Serie A | 11 | 0 | 2 | 1 | — | | — | | 13 | 1 |
| Monza | 2025–26 | Serie B | 33 | 5 | 1 | 0 | — | | 4 (Note: Appearances in Serie B promotion play-offs) | 0 | 38 | 5 |
| Monza | Total | | 116 | 16 | 5 | 1 | 0 | 0 | 4 | 0 | 125 | 17 |
| Career total | | | 315 | 40 | 18 | 3 | 20 | 1 | 18 | 3 | 371 | 47 |

=== International ===
Appearances and goals by national team and year
| National team | Year | Apps | Goals |
|---|---|---|---|
| Italy | 2020 | 1 | 0 |
| Italy | 2021 | 10 | 4 |
| Italy | 2022 | 4 | 0 |
| Italy | 2023 | 1 | 1 |
| Total | | 16 | 5 |

Scores and results list Italy's goal tally first, score column indicates score after each Pessina goal.

List of international goals scored by Matteo Pessina
| No. | Date | Venue | Cap | Opponent | Score | Result | Competition |
|---|---|---|---|---|---|---|---|
| 1 | 28 May 2021 | Sardegna Arena, Cagliari, Italy | 5 | San Marino | 5–0 | 7–0 | Friendly |
| 2 | 28 May 2021 | Sardegna Arena, Cagliari, Italy | 5 | San Marino | 7–0 | 7–0 | Friendly |
| 3 | 20 June 2021 | Stadio Olimpico, Rome, Italy | 7 | Wales | 1–0 | 1–0 | UEFA Euro 2020 |
| 4 | 26 June 2021 | Wembley Stadium, London, England | 8 | Austria | 2–0 | 2–1 (a.e.t.) | UEFA Euro 2020 |
| 5 | 26 March 2023 | National Stadium, Attard, Malta | 16 | Malta | 2–0 | 2–0 | UEFA Euro 2024 qualifying |

== Honours ==
Italy U20

- FIFA U-20 World Cup third place: 2017

Italy

- UEFA European Championship: 2020

Orders

- 5th Class / Knight: Cavaliere Ordine al Merito della Repubblica Italiana: 2021
