= Rafael Tolói =

Brazilian-Italian footballer (born 1990)

Rafael Tolói Cavaliere OMRI
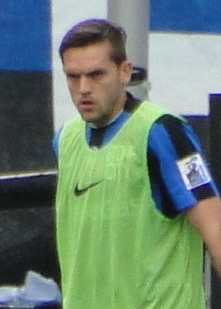
- Tolói with Atalanta in 2016

Personal information
- Full name: Rafael Tolói
- Date of birth: 10 October 1990 (age 36)
- Place of birth: Glória d'Oeste, Brazil
- Height: 1.85 m (6 ft 1 in)
- Position: Centre-back

Team information
- Current team: São Paulo
- Number: 2

Youth career
- 2007–2009: Goiás

Senior career*
Years	Team	Apps	(Gls)
2009–2012	Goiás	151	(20)
2012–2015	São Paulo	95	(3)
2014	→ Roma (loan)	5	(0)
2015–2025	Atalanta	253	(10)
2025–	São Paulo	14	(0)

International career
2009	Brazil U20	19	(0)
2021–2023	Italy	14	(0)
Medal record
Men's Football
Representing Italy
UEFA European Championship
Winner	2020 Europe
UEFA Nations League
Third place	2023 Netherlands
- * Club domestic league appearances and goals as of 03:54, 23 July 2026 (UTC)

Rafael Tolói Cavaliere OMRI (born 10 October 1990) is a professional footballer who plays as a centre-back for Campeonato Brasileiro Série A club São Paulo. Born in Brazil, he represented the Italy national team.

Tolói represented his native country of Brazil internationally at the under-20 level in 2009, but switched allegiance at the senior grade to Italy in 2021 after meeting FIFA's five-year residency requirement. He had been living in Italy since his move to Atalanta early in the 2015–16 season, and had years earlier acquired Italian citizenship, for which he was eligible because his great-grandparents hailed from Treviso, Veneto. He made his senior debut for Italy in 2021, and represented the nation at their victorious UEFA Euro 2020 campaign.

== Club career ==
=== Goiás ===
Born in Glória d'Oeste, Mato Grosso, he started playing for Goiás Esporte Clube in 2008, and helped his club win the Campeonato Goiano in 2009. Tolói played 17 Série B games for Goiás and scored two goals. He reached the 2010 Copa Sudamericana finals with the green team.

=== São Paulo ===
On 5 July 2012, São Paulo confirmed Tolói in their squad, with the defender signing a five-year contract. He scored his first goal for São Paulo on 25 July in a match against Atlético Goianiense.

On 3 August 2013, Tolói scored the goal that confirmed the title of Eusébio Cup for São Paulo FC, in a 2–0 victory against S.L. Benfica.

==== Loan to Roma ====
On 31 January 2014, Tolói was loaned to Serie A side AS Roma for the remainder of the 2013–14 season for a fee of €500,000. The move was agreed with an option to buy for a total value of €5.5 million. He made his debut for the Giallorossi in their 2–1 win against Torino on 25 March 2014, playing the full 90 minutes in place of the suspended Medhi Benatia.

=== Atalanta ===
On 26 August 2015, Tolói was signed by Italian side Atalanta for a €3.5 million transfer fee. He made his Serie A debut on 13 September, in a 2–2 draw at Sassuolo, replacing Gianpaolo Bellini in the 80th minute. In his second match on 24 September, he started and scored the only goal, settling a 1–0 league win at Empoli.

On 22 February 2018, Tolói scored for the first time in a UEFA competition, against Borussia Dortmund in the Europa League round of 32. The match ended in a 1–1 draw, which was not enough to see Atalanta through the next round, as the club had succumbed to a 3–2 defeat in the first leg.

Tolói became Atalanta's captain during the 2020–21 season, following the departure of his predecessor Papu Gómez from the club. On 1 March 2022, Tolói signed a contract extension at Atalanta, keeping him at the club through 2024 with an option to extend the deal until 2026.

On 22 May 2024, Tolói made a late substitute appearance in Atalanta's 3–0 victory over Bayer Leverkusen in the 2024 Europa League final at the Dublin Arena.

On 18 February 2025, Tolói was sent off during a UEFA Champions League playoff match against Club Brugge following an altercation with Maxim De Cuyper. After being jostled by De Cuyper, Tolói attempted to strike him with the ball but slipped and fell, before recovering and tackling De Cuyper, bringing both players to the ground. Videos of the incident subsequently gained widespread attention on social media, becoming a meme in online football culture.

=== Return to São Paulo ===
On 15 August 2025, Tolói left Atalanta and returned to São Paulo on a contract until 31 December 2026, with an automatic extension option to 31 December 2027, conditional on performance.

== International career ==
Tolói represented Brazil at the under-20 level, winning the South American Championship and placing second in the World Cup in 2009.

Having satisfied its eligibility rules by possessing Italian citizenship, residing in Italy for five years, and never representing Brazil at the senior level, FIFA approved Tolói's switch of international allegiance to Italy on 17 February 2021. He was subsequently named to the Italian squad by manager Roberto Mancini on 19 March, and made his debut on 31 March in the 2022 FIFA World Cup qualifier against Lithuania, playing the entire match in a 2–0 away victory.

On 1 June 2021, Tolói was named by manager Roberto Mancini in the 26-man Italy squad for the UEFA Euro 2020. In Italy's second group match on 16 June, he made his first appearance of the tournament, coming on as a second-half substitute for Domenico Berardi, and setting up Ciro Immobile's goal in a 3–0 win over Switzerland, which allowed Italy to advance to the round of 16. On 11 July, Tolói won the European Championship with Italy following a 3–2 penalty shoot-out victory over England at Wembley Stadium in the final, after a 1–1 draw in extra-time.

== Style of play ==
Tolói is a physically strong defender, who is mainly known for his anticipation. Although usually a centre-back, he is also capable of playing as a right-back, and is known for his ability to contribute offensively as well as defensively.

== Career statistics ==
=== Club ===
As of match played 22 July 2026

Appearances and goals by club, season and competition
Club	Season	League			State league (Note: Includes Campeonato Goiano, Campeonato Paulista)		National cup (Note: Includes Copa do Brasil, Coppa Italia)		Continental		Other		Total	
Club	Season	Division	Apps	Goals	Apps	Goals	Apps	Goals	Apps	Goals	Apps	Goals	Apps	Goals
Goiás	2008	Série A	0	0	3	0	0	0	—		—		3	0
Goiás	2009	Série A	20	2	8	1	3	0	1 (Note: Appearance(s) in Copa Sudamericana)	0	—		32	3
Goiás	2010	Série A	26	0	15	4	5	0	8	0	—		54	4
Goiás	2011	Série B	35	1	19	6	4	1	—		—		58	8
Goiás	2012	Série B	7	3	18	3	8	2	—		—		33	8
Goiás	Total		88	6	63	14	20	3	9	0	—		180	23
São Paulo	2012	Série A	26	1	—		—		10	2	—		36	3
São Paulo	2013	Série A	15	0	14	1	0	0	9 (Note: Seven appearances in Copa Libertadores, two appearances in Copa Sudamericana)	0	2 (Note: Appearances in Recopa Sudamericana)	0	40	1
São Paulo	2014	Série A	17	1	—		1	0	3	0	—		21	1
São Paulo	2015	Série A	13	0	10	0	0	0	8 (Note: Appearances in Copa Libertadores)	0	—		31	0
São Paulo	Total		71	2	24	1	1	0	30	2	2	0	128	5
Roma (loan)	2013–14	Serie A	5	0	—		0	0	—		—		5	0
Atalanta	2015–16	Serie A	24	1	—		0	0	—		—		24	1
Atalanta	2016–17	Serie A	32	0	—		3	1	—		—		35	1
Atalanta	2017–18	Serie A	31	1	—		3	1	5 (Note: Appearances in UEFA Europa League)	1	—		39	2
Atalanta	2018–19	Serie A	21	1	—		3	0	5	1	—		29	2
Atalanta	2019–20	Serie A	33	2	—		0	0	7 (Note: Appearances in UEFA Champions League)	0	—		40	2
Atalanta	2020–21	Serie A	31	2	—		4	0	8	0	—		43	2
Atalanta	2021–22	Serie A	20	1	—		0	0	8 (Note: Four appearances in UEFA Champions League, four appearances in UEFA Europa League)	0	—		28	1
Atalanta	2022–23	Serie A	32	2	—		2	0	—		—		34	2
Atalanta	2023–24	Serie A	18	0	—		1	0	5	0	—		24	0
Atalanta	2024–25	Serie A	11	0	—		2	0	4	0	0	0	17	0
Atalanta	Total		253	10	—		18	2	42	2	0	0	313	14
São Paulo	2025	Série A	7	0	—		—		0	0	—		7	0
São Paulo	2026	Série A	6	0	1	0	1	0	2	0	—		10	0
São Paulo	Total		13	0	1	0	1	0	2	0	—		17	0
Career total			430	18	88	15	40	5	79	4	2	0	643	42

=== International ===
Appearances and goals by national team and year
National team	Year	Apps	Goals
Italy	2021	8	0
Italy	2022	2	0
Italy	2023	4	0
Total		14	0

== Honours ==
Goiás

- Campeonato Goiano: 2009, 2012

São Paulo

- Copa Sudamericana: 2012

Atalanta

- UEFA Europa League: 2023–24

Italy

- UEFA European Championship: 2020

Orders

- 5th Class / Knight: Cavaliere Ordine al Merito della Repubblica Italiana: 2021
