= José Luis Palomino =

Argentine footballer (born 1990)

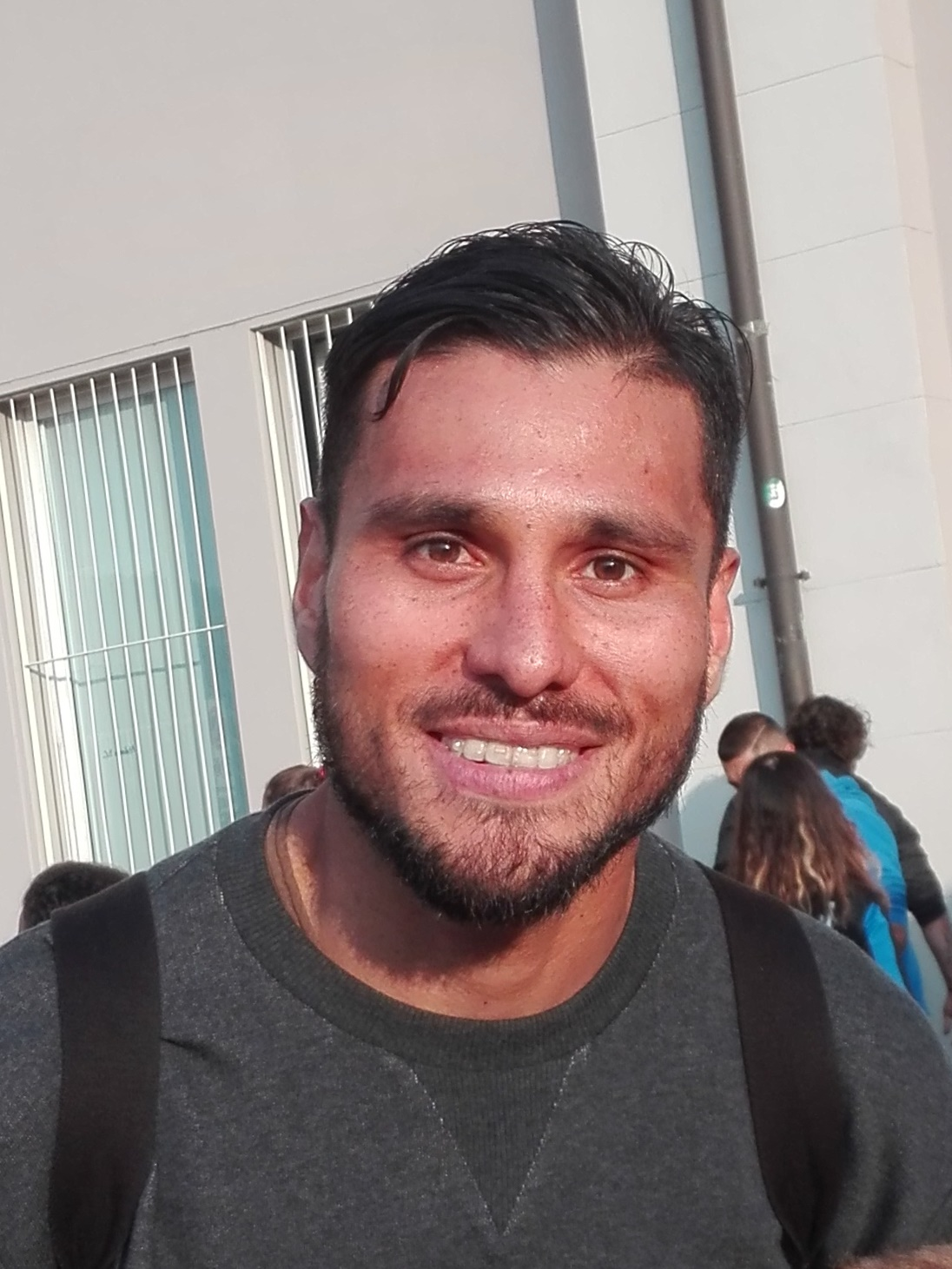
- Palomino in 2018

Personal information
- Date of birth: 5 January 1990 (age 36)
- Place of birth: San Miguel de Tucumán, Argentina
- Height: 1.88 m (6 ft 2 in)
- Position: Centre-back

Youth career
- San Lorenzo

Senior career*
Years	Team	Apps	(Gls)
2009–2013	San Lorenzo	44	(0)
2013–2014	Argentinos Juniors	18	(0)
2014–2016	Metz	51	(3)
2016–2017	Ludogorets Razgrad	27	(2)
2017–2024	Atalanta	175	(7)
2024–2025	Cagliari	18	(1)
2025–2026	Talleres	19	(0)
- * Club domestic league appearances and goals as of 17:37, 9 June 2026 (UTC)

José Luis Palomino (born 5 January 1990) is an Argentine professional footballer who plays as a centre-back. Palomino is capable in both aerial play and tackling.

Palomino began his professional career with San Lorenzo, before joining Argentinos Juniors in 2013. After the 2013–14 season, he moved to Ligue 1 club Metz. In 2016 Palomino signed with Bulgarian club Ludogorets Razgrad, with whom he won league title, before joining Atalanta in June 2017 for €4.7 million.

== Club career ==
=== San Lorenzo ===
Born in San Miguel de Tucumán, Argentina, Palomino started his youth career at San Lorenzo, one of Argentina's historic sides, joining the club when he was thirteen years old. Palomino previously played for León XIII School before leaving the academy, due to his mischief. After progressing through the ranks of the club's youth system, he was promoted to the first team.

Palomino made his San Lorenzo debut, starting the match and played 54 minutes before suffering an injury, resulting in his substitution, as the club 3–2 won against Tigre on 27 September 2009. Following the recovery of his injury, he continued to remain in the substitute bench for the next six months. Palomino did not make another appearance for the side until on 26 April 2010, when he played the full 90 minutes of a 2–0 loss against Boca Juniors. Having broken into the first team, he went on to make five appearances for San Lorenzo.

In the 2010–11 season, Palomino, however, found himself placed on the substitute bench following the new management of Ramón Díaz. He made his first appearance for San Lorenzo on 10 October 2010, playing the whole game, in a 2–0 loss against Lanús. A month later on 21 November 2010, Palomino made his second appearance of the season for the club, as he helped them keep a clean sheet, in a 0–0 draw against River Plate. After the match, Díaz praised Palomino's performance "for having played "one of the best games" of his short career, after fulfilling the role of "marking Ariel Ortega." His performance was subjected of a transfer bid from Primeira Liga side Benfica, which San Lorenzo rejected the bid. Since then, he found himself in and out of the first team, as the 2010–11 season. In the last game of the season against Banfield, Palomino set up the equalising goal, resulting in a 1–1 draw. At the end of the 2010–11 season, he made eleven appearances in all competitions.

At the start of the 2011–12 season, Palomino appeared in the first four league matches of the season. However, he suffered injuries on two occasions that saw him sidelined for two months. Palomino did not return to the starting lineup until 5 November 2011, when his team drew 1–1 against Club Olimpo. After returning from injury, he continued to regain his first team place, rotating in playing the centre–back and left–back positions. Despite being sidelined on three more occasions later in the 2011–12 season, Palomino went on to make 25 appearances in all competitions.

At the start of the 2012–13 season, Palomino started in the first two league matches of the season, playing in the left–back position. After spending a month from the first team, he didn't make his return to the starting line–up against Vélez Sarsfield on 22 September 2012, as they lost 2–1. However, Palomino was in an altercation with teammate Pablo Alvarado at half-time, which had to be resolved by teammates and coaching staff. Following this, he found himself out of favour by Manager Juan Antonio Pizzi and never played for San Lorenzo again. At the end of the 2012–13 season, Palomino made three appearances in all competitions.

=== Argentinos Juniors ===
It was announced on 8 July 2013 that Argentinos Juniors acquired Palomino from San Lorenzo for an undisclosed fee.

Palomino made his Argentinos Juniors debut, playing the whole game, in a 3–1 loss against Godoy Cruz in the opening game of the season. This was followed up by helping the club keep five consecutive clean sheets against Club Atlético Colón, San Lorenzo, Tigre, Arsenal de Sarandí and All Boys. However, he suffered an injury that kept him out for three weeks. Palomino did not return to the starting line–up until 12 October 2013 against Atlético de Rafaela. Since returning to the first team, he regained his first team place, playing in the left–back position. However, by the second half of the season, Palomino soon found himself out of the first team, due to competitions and his own injury concern. At the end of the 2013–14 season, he made eighteen appearances in all competitions.

=== FC Metz ===
During his stay at the club, Palomino attracted the attentions of European clubs, including French side FC Metz, which signed him in the summer of 2014 and signed a two–year contract with the club. Upon joining the club, he said: "I am Palomino and I am happy to be here in Metz. I haven't met Guido yet. I am happy that there is another Argentinian in the team because it will facilitate my integration in the squad but also in everyday life. I am already starting to discover the city, which I find very pleasant, now I hope to adapt quickly to the group and learn French."

Having spent the first six league matches on the substitute bench, Palomino made his FC Metz debut, coming on as an 81st-minute substitute, in a 1–0 win against Guingamp on 24 September 2014. A month later against OGC Nice in the third round of the Coupe de la Ligue, he scored his first goal for the club and then scored the winning penalty in the shoot–out, resulting in a 3–2 result after the game was played 120 minutes following a 3–3 draw. Palomino started in the left–back position for FC Metz on three occasions by the end of the year. By the second half or the season, he soon established himself in the centre–back position for the rest of the 2014–15 season. Despite missing one match later in the 2014–15 season, Palomino scored his second goal of the season, in a 4–1 loss against Lille in the last game of the season. However, the club was relegated to Ligue 2 after losing 4–0 against FC Lorient on 9 May 2015. In his first season at FC Metz, he went on to make 28 appearances and scored twice in all competitions.

At the start of the 2015–16 season, Palomino started the season well when he kept three consecutive clean sheets in the first three league matches of the season against RC Lens, Sochaux and Valenciennes. Palomino continued to regain his first team place, playing in the centre–back position for FC Metz. He scored his first goal of the season on 3 October 2015, in a 1–1 draw against Brest. As a result, Palomino was awarded the club's Player of the Month for September. He started in every match since the start of the 2015–16 season until being suspended for one match against Paris FC on 30 October 2015. After serving a one match suspension, Palomino returned to the starting line–up against Chamois Niortais on 6 November 2015 and helped the side draw 1–1. Three weeks later on 27 November 2015 against Bourg-en-Bresse, he scored his second goal of the season, in a 5–0 win. After being suspended for one match against Tours on 19 December 2015, Palomino returned to the starting line–up against Sochaux on 11 January 2016, only to be sent off in the 43rd minute for a second bookable offense, in a 1–0 win. Following his return from suspension, he continued to start in the defense for the next nine matches. Following this, however, Palomino did not play for FC Metz for the rest of the 2015–16 season due to competition and his own injury concerns. Despite this, his contributions saw the club promoted to Ligue 1 once again. In his second season FC Metz, Palomino made 29 appearances and scored twice in all competitions. Following this, he announced his intention to leave the club.

=== Ludogorets Razgrad ===
On 30 June 2016, Palomino joined Bulgarian club Ludogorets Razgrad and was given a number 5 shirt.

Palomino made his Ludogorets Razgrad's debut, coming on as a second-half substitute, against Red Star Belgrade in the second leg of the UEFA Champions League third round, as he helped the club win 4–2 on aggregate to progress to the next round. Three days later on 6 August 2016, he made his league debut for Ludogorets Razgrad, starting the whole game, in the 4–1 win over PFC Botev Plovdiv in the opening game of the season. Palomino then played in both legs against Viktoria Plzeň in the UEFA Champions League play–offs, as the club won 4–2 on aggravate to send them through to the Group Stage. He established himself as first choice in the squad, playing in the centre–back position. Palomino helped the club keep three consecutive clean sheets between 16 November 2016 and 23 November 2016 against Beroe (twice) and Basel. On 18 March 2017, he scored his first goal for Ludogorets Razgrad, in a 2–2 draw against Dunav Ruse. Palomino then scored his second goal of the season, as well as, setting up the club's fourth goal of the game, in a 4–0 win against Cherno More on 1 May 2017. He helped the club win the Bulgarian championship and participated in the groups of the 2016–17 UEFA Champions League. However, Palomino started in the final for Ludogorets Razgrad against Botev, as the club lost 2–1. Despite being sidelined on three occasions later in the 2016–17 season, he made 40 appearances and scored twice in all competitions.

=== Atalanta ===
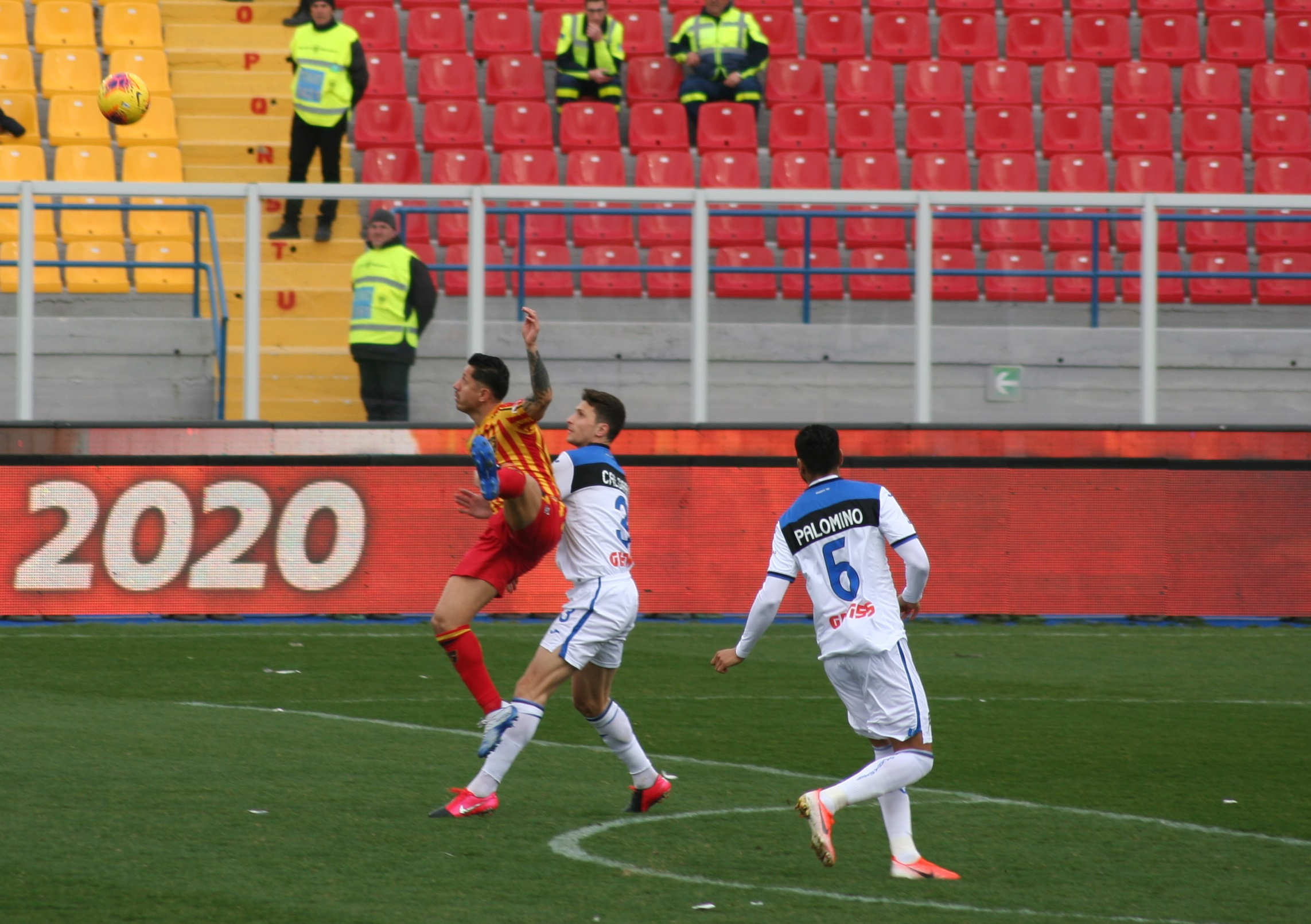
Palomino looked on as teammate Mattia Caldara marked a U.S. Lecce player on 1 March 2020.

On 29 June 2017, Palomino moved to Atalanta for a fee of €4 million. His performance at Ludogorets Razgrad last season attracted interests from European clubs.

Palomino made his Atalanta debut, playing the whole game, in a 1–0 loss against Roma in the opening game of the season. After making his club debut, his performance was praised by the Italian media. Since making his debut for Atalanta, he established himself in the starting eleven, playing in the centre–back position, and helped the club qualify for the UEFA Europa League knockout stage. However, in mid–December, Palomino suffered a knee injury that kept him out for several weeks. He returned to the starting line–up against Napoli on 2 January 2018 in the quarter–final of the Coppa Italia and helped the club win 2–1. Since returning from injury, Palomino regained his first team place for the next months for the side. Palomino scored his first goal for Atalanta on 10 February 2018 in a 1–1 draw against Crotone. However, he, once again, suffered a knee injury that saw him miss the next three matches for the side. Palomino returned to the first team on 29 April 2018, coming on as an 87th-minute substitute, in a 3–1 win against Genoa. At the end of the 2017–18 season, he went on to make thirty–five appearances and scoring once in all competitions. Reflecting on his first season at the club, Palomino said: "I finish the happy season. I have played a lot, more than thirty games, counting all the competitions. And I have to admit that being my first season, I didn't plan on playing that much right away. I'm glad, I'm happy with what I've done. I think we all had a good season. The Atalanta fans immediately appreciated your professionalism and your commitment. I feel the warmth and affection of the people and this is very important to me. They always made me feel good in Bergamo, they trusted me right from the start."

At the start of the 2018–19 season, Palomino played in both legs against FK Sarajevo in the second round of the UEFA Europa League and scored in the second leg, as Atalanta won 10–2 on aggregate to progress to the next round. However, he suffered a minor knock that saw him miss two matches. Upon returning to the first team from injury against Roma on 27 August 2018, Palomino was given the captaincy in the absence of Papu Gómez, who was on the substitute bench, and helped the club draw 3–3. He then regained his first team place, playing in the centre–back position despite suffering from a minor knock along the way. Palomino then scored his first goal of the season, in a 3–0 win against Parma on 27 October 2018. However, in a match against Genoa on 22 December 2018, he was sent off for a second bookable offense, as Atalanta lost 3–1. After serving a one match suspension, Palomino returned to the starting line–up against Sassuolo on 26 December 2018 and set up the club's third goal of the game, in a 6–2 win. Since returning from suspension, he continued to regain his first team place, playing in the centre–back position, for the rest of the 2018–19 season. Palomino played in both legs of the semi–final of the Coppa Italia against Fiorentina, as he helped the club win 5–4 to reach the final. However, in the Coppa Italia Final against Lazio, he started the whole game, as they lost 2–0. After serving a one match suspension, Palomino returned to the starting line–up against Sassuolo in the last game of the season and helped Atalanta win 3–1; with this result, Atalanta achieved a third-place finish in the league, qualifying to the 2019–20 UEFA Champions League group stage for the first time in their history. At the end of the 2018–19 season, he went on to make 39 appearances and scored twice in all competitions.

Ahead of the 2019–20 season, Palomino was linked a move return to his homeland country, as Boca Juniors wanted to sign him, having tried to do so eight months prior, but ended up staying at Atalanta. Initially, he appeared six out of the first ten league matches of the season, with four were on the substitute bench for Atalanta. By November, Palomino regained his first team place, playing in the centre–back position. He then helped the club qualify for the UEFA Champions League knockout after beating Shakhtar Donetsk 3–0 on the last match of the Group Stage. Palomino then scored his first goal of the season in a 2–1 win against Roma on 15 February 2020. Four days later on 20 February 2020, he made his 100th appearance for Atalanta against Valencia in the first leg of the UEFA Champions League Last of 16, winning 4–1. In the return leg, Palomino helped the club progress to the quarter–finals of the UEFA Champions League after a 4–3 away win against Valencia. However, the season was suspended because of the COVID-19 pandemic. Once the season resumed behind closed doors, he remained an integral part of the team and scored his second goal of the season in a 3–2 win against Lazio on 24 June 2020. Atalanta went on to secure a top four finish, qualifying for the Champions League for the second consecutive season. Despite being sidelined on three occasions during the 2019–20 season, Palomino made 38 appearances and scored twice in all competitions.

Palomino scored his first Champions League goal on 23 November 2021 in a 3–3 group stage draw with Young Boys.

=== Cagliari ===
On 13 August 2024, Palomino signed a one-season contract with Cagliari.

=== Talleres ===
On 16 July 2025, Palomino signed with Talleres until the end of 2026.

== Career statistics ==
=== Club ===
As of match played 25 May 2025

Appearances and goals by club, season and competition
Club	Season	League			National cup		League cup		Continental		Other		Total	
Club	Season	Division	Apps	Goals	Apps	Goals	Apps	Goals	Apps	Goals	Apps	Goals	Apps	Goals
San Lorenzo	2009–10	Argentine Primera División	5	0	–		–		–		–		5	0
San Lorenzo	2010–11	Argentine Primera División	11	0	–		–		–		–		11	0
San Lorenzo	2011–12	Argentine Primera División	25	0	4	0	–		–		–		29	0
San Lorenzo	2012–13	Argentine Primera División	3	0	0	0	–		–		–		3	0
San Lorenzo	Total		44	0	4	0	–		–		–		48	0
Argentinos Juniors	2013–14	Argentine Primera División	18	0	–		–		–		–		18	0
Metz	2014–15	Ligue 1	24	1	2	0	2	1	–		–		28	2
Metz	2015–16	Ligue 2	27	2	1	0	2	0	–		–		30	2
Metz	Total		51	3	3	0	4	1	–		–		58	4
Ludogorets Razgrad II	2016–17	Vtora Liga	2	0	–		–		–		–		2	0
Ludogorets Razgrad	2016–17	Bulgarian First League	27	2	4	0	–		10 (Note: Eight appearances in UEFA Champions League, two appearances in UEFA Europa League)	0	–		41	2
Atalanta	2017–18	Serie A	26	1	2	0	–		7 (Note: Appearance(s) in UEFA Europa League)	0	–		35	1
Atalanta	2018–19	Serie A	30	1	5	0	–		4	1	–		39	2
Atalanta	2019–20	Serie A	30	2	1	0	–		7 (Note: Appearance(s) in UEFA Champions League)	0	–		38	2
Atalanta	2020–21	Serie A	36	1	4	0	–		6	0	–		46	1
Atalanta	2021–22	Serie A	34	1	2	0	–		9 (Note: Five appearances and one goal in UEFA Champions League, three appearances in UEFA Europa League)	1	–		45	2
Atalanta	2022–23	Serie A	15	1	1	0	–		–		–		16	1
Atalanta	2023–24	Serie A	4	0	1	0	–		1	0	–		6	0
Atalanta	Total		175	7	16	0	–		34	2	–		225	9
Cagliari	2024–25	Serie A	18	1	2	0	–		–		–		20	1
Career total			335	13	29	0	4	1	44	2	0	0	411	16

== Honours ==
Ludogorets Razgrad

- Bulgarian First League: 2016–17

== Personal life ==
Palomino is married to Juline Aline Mathey, a French citizen and a model, and together, they have a daughter.

Growing up, Palomino was thirteen when he helped out his father's business, selling cookies and hotdog. Palomino said his passion outside of football is architecture.

In 2020, he tested positive for COVID-19.
