= Robin Gosens =

German footballer (born 1994)

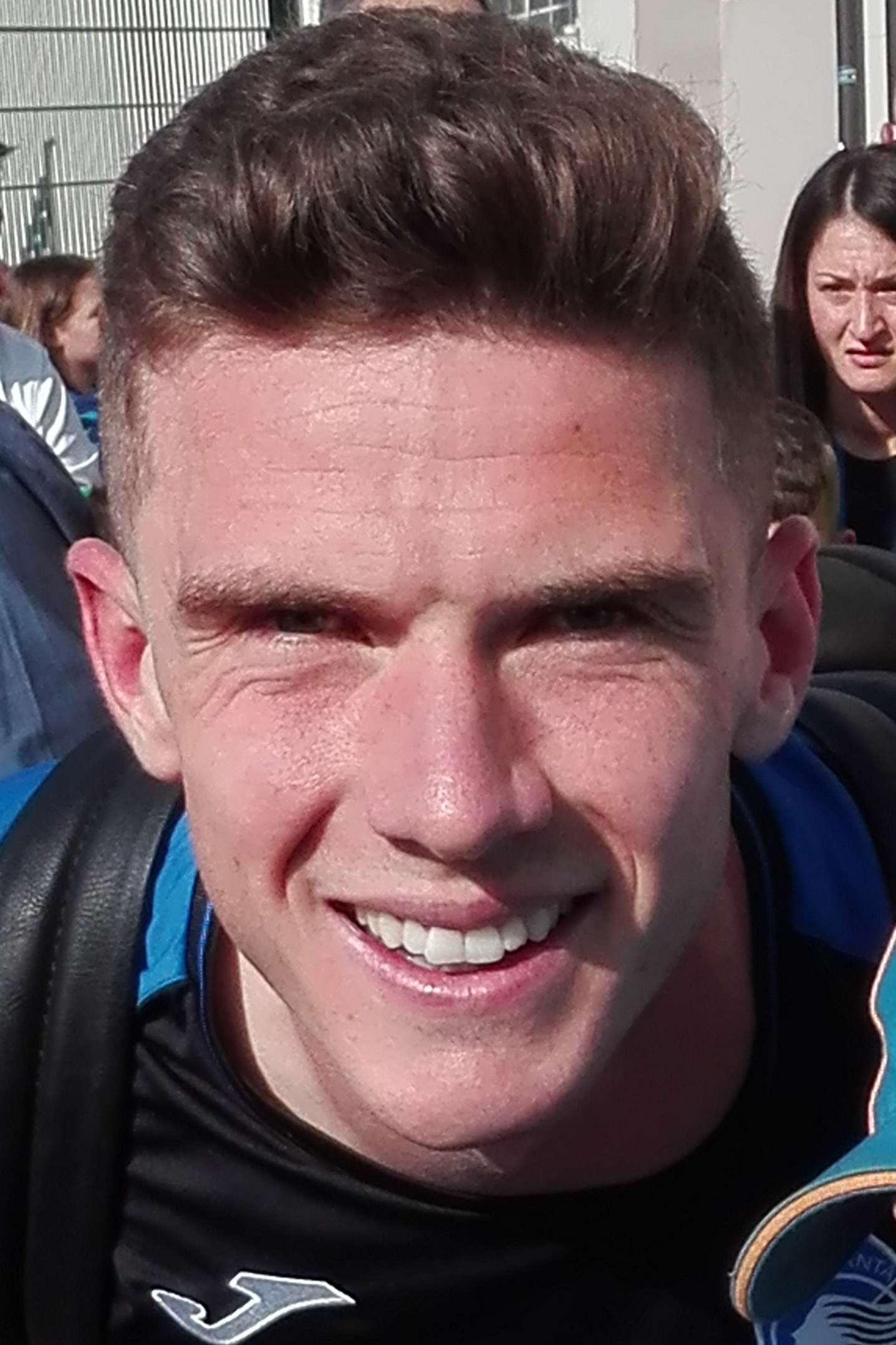
- Gosens with Atalanta in 2018

Personal information
- Full name: Robin Everardus Gosens
- Date of birth: 5 July 1994 (age 32)
- Place of birth: Emmerich am Rhein, Germany
- Height: 1.83 m (6 ft 0 in)
- Positions: Left-back; left wing-back

Team information
- Current team: Schalke 04 (on loan from Fiorentina)
- Number: 8

Youth career
- 2000–2007: Fortuna Elten
- 2007–2009: 1. FC Bocholt
- 2009–2012: VfL Rhede
- 2012–2014: Vitesse

Senior career*
Years	Team	Apps	(Gls)
2014–2015	Vitesse	0	(0)
2014–2015	→ Dordrecht (loan)	47	(3)
2015–2017	Heracles Almelo	60	(4)
2017–2022	Atalanta	121	(25)
2022	→ Inter Milan (loan)	7	(0)
2022–2023	Inter Milan	32	(3)
2023–2025	Union Berlin	31	(6)
2024–2025	→ Fiorentina (loan)	32	(5)
2025–	Fiorentina	26	(3)
2026–	→ Schalke 04 (loan)	8	(1)

International career
2020–2025	Germany	24	(2)
- * Club domestic league appearances and goals as of 9 November 2026

Robin Everardus Gosens (born 5 July 1994) is a German professional footballer who plays as a left-back or left wing-back for Bundesliga club Schalke 04, on loan from Serie A club Fiorentina.

== Club career ==
=== Vitesse ===
Born in Emmerich am Rhein, Gosens appeared for local clubs such as Fortuna Elten, 1. FC Bocholt and VfL Rhede, before joining Vitesse's youth setup on 4 July 2012. On 13 August 2013, he signed his first professional deal with the club. Prior to this, he failed at a trial workout with Bundesliga giant Borussia Dortmund. Gosens himself called it a fiasco.

==== FC Dordrecht (loan) ====
On 14 January 2014, Gosens was loaned to FC Dordrecht until the end of the season. He made his professional debut three days later, starting in a 1–1 home draw against SBV Excelsior.

Gosens scored his first professional goal on 7 February, netting the second in a 6–1 home victory against FC Emmen. He appeared in 20 matches during the campaign (play-offs included), as his side finished second and returned to Eredivisie after a nineteen-year absence.

On 29 May 2014, Gosens' loan was renewed for a further year, and he made his Eredivisie debut on 9 August, playing the full 90 minutes in a 2–1 away win against SC Heerenveen. He scored his first goal in the competition on 20 September, netting his side's only goal in a 1–1 away draw against Excelsior.

=== Heracles Almelo ===
On 4 June 2015, it was announced that Gosens had moved on a free transfer to Heracles Almelo.

=== Atalanta ===
On 2 June 2017, it was announced that Gosens had transferred to Italian Serie A side Atalanta. On 18 September 2019, Gosens made his UEFA Champions League debut against Dinamo Zagreb. On 11 December, he scored his first Champions League goal in a 3–0 away win over Shakhtar Donetsk. On 25 November 2020, he scored his second Champions League goal in a 2–0 win over Liverpool away at Anfield.

Gosens established himself as one of the top wing-backs in the Serie A, excelling both offensively and defensively. During the 2019–20 and 2020–21 seasons, he was one of Atalanta's top goalscorers of the season scoring 10 goals and 12 goals, unprecedentedly high numbers for a defender.

On 14 September 2021, Gosens scored the equalizing goal for Atalanta in a 2–2 away draw against Villarreal in the first fixture of the 2021–22 Champions League season.

=== Inter Milan ===
On 27 January 2022, Inter Milan announced the signing of Gosens on a loan until the end of the season, with an obligation to buy if certain conditions were met. On 12 April, it was announced that Gosens would join Inter permanently following the season, by activating the buy option in his loan deal.

On 12 October 2022, he scored his first Champions League goal with Inter in a 3–3 away draw against Barcelona at Camp Nou.

On 10 June 2023, he played in the 2023 Champions League final as a substitute in the second half, which ended in a 1–0 defeat against Manchester City.

=== Union Berlin ===
On 15 August 2023, after a year-and-a-half with Inter Milan, Gosens signed with Bundesliga side and Champions League contenders Union Berlin. With this move, he fulfilled his Bundesliga dream. According to media reports, the transfer fee was around €15 million, making him Union Berlin's record transfer. Previously, fellow German club VfL Wolfsburg also expressed interest in signing Gosens.

Gosens made his club and Bundesliga debut as a substitute five days later on August 20 at the Stadion An der Alten Försterei in a 4–1 home win over Mainz on the first matchday of the Bundesliga season. The following week, on August 26, he would make his first start in the Bundesliga at the Merck-Stadion am Böllenfalltor and made an immediate impact, scoring two goals for Union Berlin in a 4–1 away victory over Darmstadt.

=== Fiorentina ===
On 30 August 2024, Gosens returned to the Serie A with Fiorentina, joining on a season-long loan with a conditional obligation to buy. On 8 May 2025, he scored twice against Real Betis in the second leg of the UEFA Europa Conference League semi-final, which ended in a 2–2 draw. After his substitution, the match resulted in a 4–3 aggregate defeat in extra time. At the end of the 2024–25 season, the conditional obligation to buy was triggered, making the transfer permanent.

==== Schalke 04 (loan) ====
On 17 July 2026, Gosens signed for Bundesliga club Schalke 04 on loan for the 2026–27 season, with an obligation to buy triggered by a set number of appearances and Schalke's league survival.

== International career ==
On 25 August 2020, Gosens received his first call-up to represent the Germany national team. He made his debut on 3 September, starting in the 2020–21 UEFA Nations League match against Spain.

On 19 May 2021, Gosens was included in then-manager Joachim Löw's 26-man Germany squad for UEFA Euro 2020. A month later on 19 June, he scored a goal and provided an assist in a 4–2 win over Portugal in a group stage game at the tournament, for which he was awarded the Star of the Match.

Gosens was excluded from the Germany squad for the 2022 FIFA World Cup, with coach Hansi Flick stating the reason was Gosens' loss of rhythm over the previous year due to a lack of appearances.

After also not being nominated for the UEFA Euro 2024 in Germany, he was called up to the team again by new manager Julian Nagelsmann for the UEFA Nations League games in October 2024.

== Personal life ==
Gosens was born in Emmerich am Rhein, North Rhine-Westphalia near the Dutch border and grew up in Elten, a part of the municipality of Emmerich. Elten was under Dutch administration from 1949 until 1963, and many older inhabitants hold the Dutch citizenship, including Gosens' father Holger Gosens. Robin holds both German and Dutch citizenship. During a press conference for the Germany national team, Gosens mentioned that he grew up as a Schalke 04 fan. In June 2022, he married his girlfriend Rabea Böhlke, with whom he has two sons born in 2021 and 2023 respectively.

On 22 February 2023, Gosens earned his B.Sc. in psychology from the SRH Fernhochschule.

He departed the German national team in November 2023 to take parental leave for the birth of his second son.

== Career statistics ==
=== Club ===
As of match played 8 November 2026

Appearances and goals by club, season and competition
Club	Season	League			National cup (Note: Includes KNVB Cup, Coppa Italia, DFB-Pokal)		Europe		Other		Total	
Club	Season	Division	Apps	Goals	Apps	Goals	Apps	Goals	Apps	Goals	Apps	Goals
Dordrecht (loan)	2013–14	Eerste Divisie	16	1	0	0	—		4 (Note: Appearances in Eerste Divisie promotion play-offs)	0	20	1
Dordrecht (loan)	2014–15	Eredivisie	31	2	2	0	—		—		33	2
Dordrecht (loan)	Total		47	3	2	0	—		4	0	53	3
Heracles Almelo	2015–16	Eredivisie	32	2	3	1	—		3 (Note: Appearances in Eredivisie European play-offs)	0	38	3
Heracles Almelo	2016–17	Eredivisie	28	2	2	0	2 (Note: Appearances in UEFA Europa League)	0	—		32	2
Heracles Almelo	Total		60	4	5	1	2	0	3	0	70	5
Atalanta	2017–18	Serie A	21	1	2	0	3	1	—		26	2
Atalanta	2018–19	Serie A	28	3	3	0	5	0	—		36	3
Atalanta	2019–20	Serie A	34	9	1	0	8 (Note: Appearances in UEFA Champions League)	1	—		43	10
Atalanta	2020–21	Serie A	32	11	5	0	7	1	—		44	12
Atalanta	2021–22	Serie A	6	1	0	0	2	1	—		8	2
Atalanta	Total		121	25	11	0	25	4	—		157	29
Inter Milan (loan)	2021–22	Serie A	7	0	2	1	0	0	—		9	1
Inter Milan	2022–23	Serie A	32	3	5	0	11	1	1 (Note: Appearance in Supercoppa Italiana)	0	49	4
Inter Milan	Inter total		39	3	7	1	11	1	1	0	58	5
Union Berlin	2023–24	Bundesliga	30	6	1	0	6	1	—		37	7
Union Berlin	2024–25	Bundesliga	1	0	1	0	—		—		2	0
Union Berlin	Total		31	6	2	0	6	1	—		39	7
Fiorentina (loan)	2024–25	Serie A	32	5	1	0	8 (Note: Appearances in UEFA Conference League)	3	—		41	8
Fiorentina	2025–26	Serie A	26	3	1	0	9	1	—		36	4
Fiorentina	Fiorentina total		58	8	2	0	17	4	—		77	12
Schalke 04 (loan)	2026–27	Bundesliga	8	1	1	0	—		—		9	1
Career total			364	50	30	2	61	10	8	0	463	62

=== International ===
Appearances and goals by national team and year
National team	Year	Apps	Goals
Germany	2020	4	0
Germany	2021	9	2
Germany	2022	1	0
Germany	2023	6	0
Germany	2024	3	0
Germany	2025	1	0
Total		24	2

Scores and results list Germany's goal tally first.

List of international goals scored by Robin Gosens
No.	Date	Venue	Cap	Opponent	Score	Result	Competition
1	7 June 2021	Merkur Spiel-Arena, Düsseldorf, Germany	7	Latvia	1–0	7–1	Friendly
2	19 June 2021	Allianz Arena, Munich, Germany	9	Portugal	4–1	4–2	UEFA Euro 2020

== Honours ==
Inter Milan

- Coppa Italia: 2021–22, 2022–23
- Supercoppa Italiana: 2022
- UEFA Champions League runner-up: 2022–23

Individual

- Serie A Team of the Year: 2019–20
- UEFA Conference League Team of the Season: 2024–25
