= Pierluigi Gollini =

Italian footballer (born 1995)

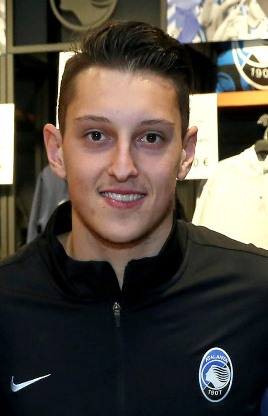
- Gollini with Atalanta in 2017

Personal information
- Full name: Pierluigi Gollini
- Date of birth: 18 March 1995 (age 31)
- Place of birth: Bologna, Italy
- Height: 1.94 m (6 ft 4 in)
- Position: Goalkeeper

Team information
- Current team: Roma
- Number: 95

Youth career
- SPAL
- 2010–2012: Fiorentina
- 2012–2014: Manchester United

Senior career*
Years	Team	Apps	(Gls)
2014–2016	Hellas Verona	29	(0)
2016–2018	Aston Villa	20	(0)
2017–2018	→ Atalanta (loan)	11	(0)
2018–2025	Atalanta	78	(0)
2021–2022	→ Tottenham Hotspur (loan)	0	(0)
2022–2023	→ Fiorentina (loan)	3	(0)
2023–2024	→ Napoli (loan)	11	(0)
2024–2025	→ Genoa (loan)	7	(0)
2025–	Roma	5	(0)

International career^{‡}
2012–2013	Italy U18	7	(0)
2013–2014	Italy U19	8	(0)
2015	Italy U20	2	(0)
2016–2017	Italy U21	3	(0)
2019	Italy	1	(0)
- * Club domestic league appearances and goals as of 07:26, 18 October 2026 (UTC) ‡ National team caps and goals as of 23:24, 2 June 2022 (UTC)

Pierluigi Gollini (born 18 March 1995) is an Italian professional footballer who plays as a goalkeeper for Serie A club Roma. He also plays for the Italy national team.

Having played at SPAL and Fiorentina at youth level and graduating from Manchester United's youth academy, Gollini began his senior career with Hellas Verona in 2014, and joined Atalanta in 2018 after playing for Aston Villa in 2016.

== Club career ==
=== Hellas Verona ===
Gollini joined Hellas Verona in 2014 from Manchester United. He made his Serie A debut on 24 September 2014 as a starter in a 2–2 home draw against Genoa.

=== Aston Villa ===
After two seasons with Verona, Gollini signed for Championship club Aston Villa on 8 July 2016. He made his first appearance for Aston Villa in an 8–0 friendly win over Austrian side Grazer AK the following day.

Gollini started the season as newly relegated Villa's first-choice goalkeeper under manager Roberto Di Matteo; however, Villa struggled in the early parts of the campaign, with Gollini making notable errors against Sheffield Wednesday and Huddersfield Town. Di Matteo was sacked in early October and replaced by Steve Bruce, who continued to play Gollini until December. The Italian was dropped for the festive period games in favour of Mark Bunn, and on 5 January 2017, Villa brought goalkeeper Sam Johnstone in on loan from Manchester United, and he took over as first-choice goalkeeper.

=== Atalanta ===
On 13 January 2017, Gollini signed for Italian club Atalanta on an 18-month loan. On 10 June 2018, Gollini signed permanently for Atalanta for an undisclosed fee. He spent the first half of the year as backup to Etrit Berisha, however claimed the starting spot in the second half of the season. Berisha was loaned out the following summer, making Gollini the undisputed starter. Gollini started every match in Atalanta's debut season in the UEFA Champions League, as they finished second in their group, qualifying for the round of 16.

==== Loan to Tottenham Hotspur ====
On 24 July 2021, Gollini joined Premier League club Tottenham Hotspur on loan for the season. He made his debut for the club on 19 August 2021, starting in the UEFA Europa Conference League first leg tie against Paços de Ferreira, which ended in a 1–0 defeat. Gollini returned to his parent club Atalanta on 2 June 2022.

==== Loan to Fiorentina ====
On 9 July 2022, Gollini joined Fiorentina on a season-long loan, with an option to buy. After starting the first three games of the 2022–23 Serie A season, Gollini moved to the bench, backing up Pietro Terracciano. Gollini was the first-choice goalkeeper for Fiorentina's Europa Conference League campaign, playing in five of their six group stage games.

==== Loan to Napoli ====
On 25 January 2023, Gollini moved to Napoli on loan with an option to buy.

On 16 July 2023, Gollini rejoined Napoli on loan for another season with an option to buy.

==== Loan to Genoa ====
After Napoli failed to exercise a purchase option, Gollini was loaned to Genoa on 30 July 2024, again with an option to buy. After starting the first seven games of the 2024–25 Serie A season, Gollini sustained a hip injury, which allowed his backup, Nicola Leali, to step in and establish himself as Genoa's first-choice goalkeeper. As a result, Gollini's loan was ended prematurely in January 2025.

=== Roma ===
On 24 January 2025, Gollini moved to Roma on a permanent basis.

== International career ==
Gollini made his debut with the Italy U21 team on 2 June 2016, in a 0–1 loss against France.

Gollini made his senior debut for Italy under manager Roberto Mancini, on 15 November 2019, coming on as a late substitute for Gianluigi Donnarumma in a 3–0 away win over Bosnia and Herzegovina, in a Euro 2020 qualifier.

== Personal life ==
In June 2018, under the pseudonym Gollorius, Gollini published a rap music single "Rapper coi guanti" (Rapper with gloves); he donated the proceeds to charity.

== Career statistics ==
=== Club ===
As of match played 17 October 2026

Appearances and goals by club, season and competition
Club	Season	League			National cup (Note: Includes Coppa Italia, FA Cup)		League cup (Note: Includes EFL Cup)		Europe		Other		Total	
Club	Season	Division	Apps	Goals	Apps	Goals	Apps	Goals	Apps	Goals	Apps	Goals	Apps	Goals
Hellas Verona	2014–15	Serie A	3	0	0	0	—		—		—		3	0
Hellas Verona	2015–16	Serie A	26	0	1	0	—		—		—		27	0
Hellas Verona	Total		29	0	1	0	—		—		—		30	0
Aston Villa	2016–17	Championship	20	0	0	0	0	0	—		—		20	0
Atalanta (loan)	2016–17	Serie A	4	0	—		—		—		—		4	0
Atalanta (loan)	2017–18	Serie A	7	0	1	0	—		0	0	—		8	0
Atalanta (loan)	Total		11	0	1	0	—		0	0	—		12	0
Atalanta	2018–19	Serie A	20	0	3	0	—		4 (Note: Appearance(s) in UEFA Europa League)	0	—		27	0
Atalanta	2019–20	Serie A	33	0	1	0	—		7 (Note: Appearances in UEFA Champions League)	0	—		41	0
Atalanta	2020–21	Serie A	25	0	4	0	—		3	0	—		32	0
Atalanta	Total		78	0	8	0	—		14	0	—		100	0
Tottenham Hotspur (loan)	2021–22	Premier League	0	0	1	0	3	0	6 (Note: Appearances in UEFA Europa Conference League)	0	—		10	0
Fiorentina (loan)	2022–23	Serie A	3	0	1	0	—		5	0	—		9	0
Napoli (loan)	2022–23	Serie A	4	0	—		—		0	0	—		4	0
Napoli (loan)	2023–24	Serie A	7	0	1	0	—		0	0	2 (Note: Appearances in Supercoppa Italiana)	0	10	0
Napoli (loan)	Total		11	0	1	0	—		0	0	2	0	14	0
Genoa (loan)	2024–25	Serie A	7	0	0	0	—		—		—		7	0
Roma	2024–25	Serie A	0	0	0	0	—		0	0	—		0	0
Roma	2025–26	Serie A	0	0	0	0	—		1	0	—		1	0
Roma	2026–27	Serie A	5	0	0	0	—		2	0	—		7	0
Roma	Total		5	0	0	0	—		3	0	—		8	0
Career total			164	0	13	0	3	0	28	0	2	0	210	0

=== International ===
As of match played 15 November 2019

Appearances and goals by national team and year
National team	Year	Apps	Goals
Italy	2019	1	0
Total		1	0

== Honours ==
Napoli

- Serie A: 2022–23
