= 2025–26 Coppa Italia =

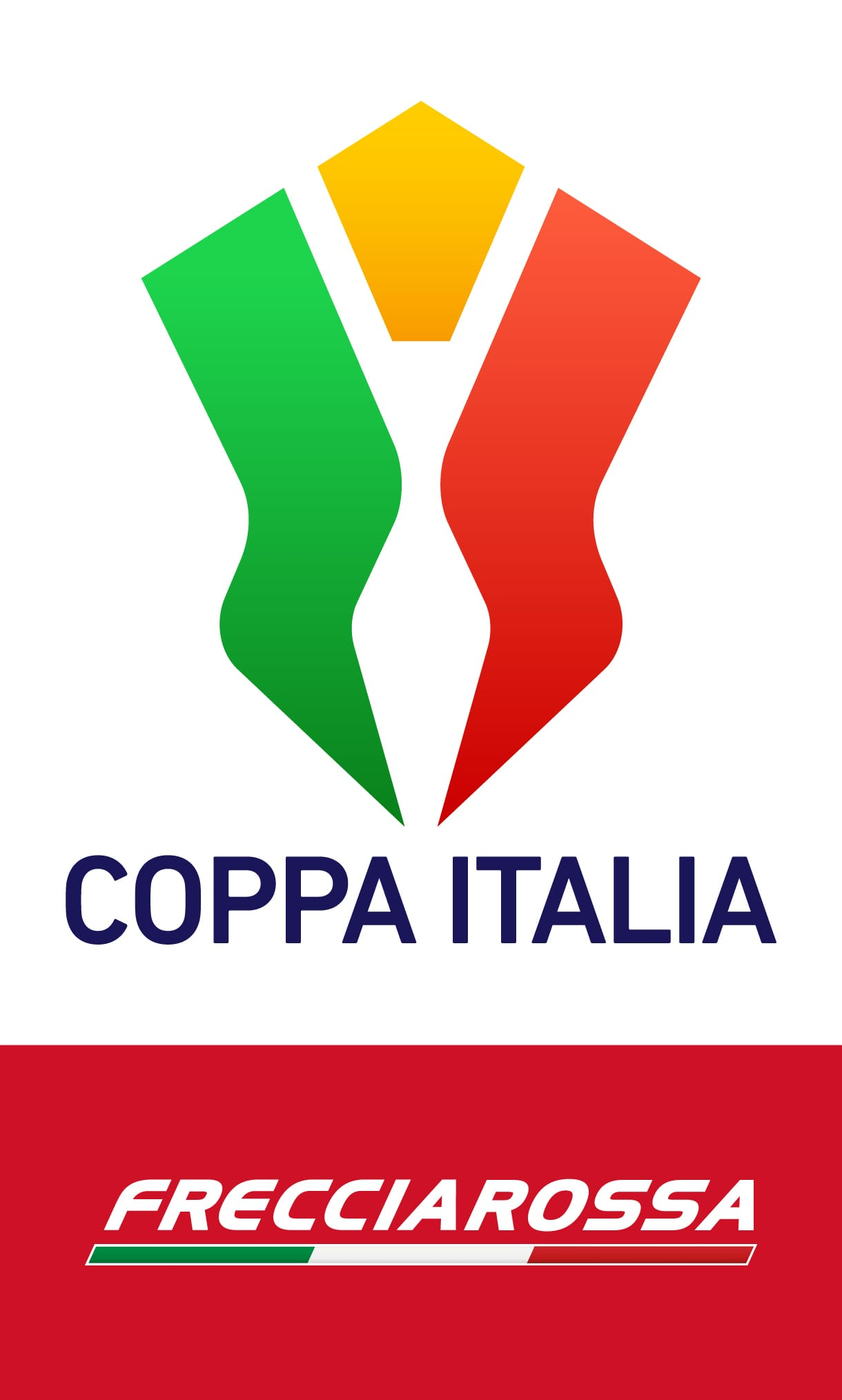

Tournament details
- Country: Italy
- Dates: 9 August 2025 – 13 May 2026
- Teams: 44

Final positions
- Champions: Inter Milan (10th title)
- Runners-up: Lazio

Tournament statistics
- Matches played: 45
- Goals scored: 111 (2.47 per match)
- Top goal scorer(s): Mario Pašalić (4 goals)

The 2025–26 Coppa Italia (branded as the Coppa Italia Frecciarossa for sponsorship reasons) was the 79th edition of the national domestic tournament. There were 44 participating teams.

Bologna were the defending champions, having won their third title in the previous edition after defeating AC Milan 1–0 in the final. They were eliminated by Lazio in the quarter-finals. Inter Milan won its tenth Coppa Italia, defeating Lazio 2–0 in the final.

== Format and seeding ==
Teams entered the competition at various stages, as follows:

- First phase (one-legged fixtures)
  - Preliminary round: the four teams from Serie C and four Serie B teams started the tournament
  - First round: the four winners were joined by the remaining 16 Serie B teams, and 12 teams from Serie A
  - Second round: the 16 winners faced each other
- Second phase
  - Round of 16 (one-legged): the eight winners were joined by Serie A clubs, seeded 1–8 (last year winners Bologna and clubs ranked 1–7 in the 2024–25 Serie A)
  - Quarter-finals (one-legged): the eight winners faced each other
  - Semi-finals (two-legged): the four winners faced each other
  - Final (one-legged): the two winners faced each other

== Round dates ==
Phase	Round	Clubs remaining	Clubs involved	From previous round	Entries in this round	First leg	Second leg
First stage	Preliminary round	44	8	none	8	9–10 August 2025	
First stage	First round	40	32	4	28	15–18 August 2025	
First stage	Second round	24	16	16	none	23–25 September 2025	
Second stage	Round of 16	16	16	8	8	2–4 December 2025; 13–27 January 2026	
Second stage	Quarter-finals	8	8	8	none	4–11 February 2026	
Second stage	Semi-finals	4	4	4	none	3–4 March 2026	21–22 April 2026
Second stage	Final	2	2	2	none	13 May 2026	

== Participating teams ==
Serie A The 20 clubs of the 2025–26 season	Serie B The 20 clubs of the 2025–26 season	Serie C Four clubs of the 2025–26 season
Atalanta; Bologna; Cagliari; Como; Cremonese; Fiorentina; Genoa; Hellas Verona; Inter; Juventus; Lazio; Lecce; Milan; Napoli; Parma; Pisa; Roma; Sassuolo; Torino; Udinese	Avellino; Bari; Carrarese; Catanzaro; Cesena; Empoli; Frosinone; Juve Stabia; Mantova; Modena; Monza; Padova; Palermo; Pescara; Reggiana; Sampdoria; Spezia; Südtirol; Venezia; Virtus Entella	Audace Cerignola; Rimini; Ternana; Vicenza

== First stage ==
=== Preliminary round ===
Eight teams from Serie B and Serie C competed in this round, with the four winners advancing to the first round.

9 August 2025	Virtus Entella (2)	4–0	Ternana (3)	Chiavari
20:30 CEST	Russo 16'; Franzoni 59'; Fumagalli 70'; Di Mario 85'	Report		Stadium: Stadio Enrico Sannazzari; Attendance: 1,399; Referee: Alberto Poli

10 August 2025	Padova (2)	0–2	Vicenza (3)	Padua
19:30 CEST		Report	Capello 14'; Caferri 46'	Stadium: Stadio Euganeo; Attendance: 6,765; Referee: Dario Madonia

10 August 2025	Audace Cerignola (3)	1–0	Avellino (2)	Cerignola
20:30 CEST	Cuppone 61'	Report		Stadium: Stadio Domenico Monterisi; Attendance: 2,532; Referee: Juan Luca Sacchi

10 August 2025	Pescara (2)	1–0	Rimini (3)	Pescara
20:30 CEST	Valzania 44'	Report		Stadium: Stadio Adriatico; Attendance: 4,610; Referee: Lucio Angelillo

=== First round ===
32 teams (4 winners from the preliminary round, the remaining 16 teams from Serie B and 12 Serie A teams seeded 9–20) competed in this round, with the 16 winners advancing to the second round.

15 August 2025	Empoli (2)	1–1 (3–0 p)	Reggiana (2)	Empoli
18:00 CEST	Ilie 64'	Report	Gondo 13'	Stadium: Stadio Carlo Castellani; Attendance: 1,894; Referee: Andrea Calzavara
	Penalties
	Belardinelli (penalty scored); Elia (penalty scored); Carboni (penalty missed); Busiello (penalty scored)		(penalty missed) Gondo; (penalty missed) Marras; (penalty missed) Rover

15 August 2025	Sassuolo (1)	1–0	Catanzaro (2)	Reggio Emilia
18:30 CEST	Doig 32'	Report		Stadium: Mapei Stadium – Città del Tricolore; Attendance: 1,771; Referee: Niccolò Turrini

15 August 2025	Lecce (1)	2–0	Juve Stabia (2)	Lecce
20:45 CEST	Krstović 27' (pen.); Kaba 90+4'	Report		Stadium: Stadio Via del mare Attendance: 10,667; Referee: Giuseppe Mucera

15 August 2025	Genoa (1)	3–0	Vicenza (3)	Genoa
21:15 CEST	Carboni 40'; Benassai 45+1' (o.g.); Stanciu 54'	Report		Stadium: Stadio Luigi Ferraris; Attendance: 31,281; Referee: Maria Sole Ferrieri Caputi

16 August 2025	Venezia (2)	4–0	Mantova (2)	Venice
18:00 CEST	Doumbia 15', 45+1'; Yeboah 57', 89'	Report		Stadium: Stadio Pier Luigi Penzo; Attendance: 4,853; Referee: Claudio Allegretta

16 August 2025	Como (1)	3–1	Südtirol (2)	Como
18:30 CEST	Douvikas 39', 40'; Da Cunha 42'	Report	Casiraghi 13' (pen.)	Stadium: Stadio Giuseppe Sinigaglia; Attendance: 9,985; Referee: Simone Galipò

16 August 2025	Cagliari (1)	1–1 (5–4 p)	Virtus Entella (2)	Cagliari
20:45 CEST	Piccoli 45'	Report	Deiola 87' (o.g.)	Stadium: Unipol Domus; Attendance: 15,748; Referee: Mario Perr
	Penalties
	Mina (penalty scored); Ndary Adopo (penalty missed); Kılıçsoy (penalty scored); Folorunsho (penalty scored); Esposito (penalty scored); Cavuoti (penalty scored)		(penalty scored) Russo; (penalty scored) Castelli; (penalty missed) Karić; (penalty scored) Debenedetti; (penalty scored) Tiritiello; (penalty missed) Marconi

16 August 2025	Cremonese (1)	0–0 (4–5 p)	Palermo (2)	Cremona
21:15 CEST		Report		Stadium: Stadio Giovanni Zini; Attendance: 5,845; Referee: Andrea Zanott
	Penalties
	Bondo (penalty scored); Vázquez (penalty scored); Mussolini (penalty scored); Terracciano (penalty scored); Johnsen (penalty missed)		(penalty scored) Brunori; (penalty scored) Palumbo; (penalty scored) Corona; (penalty scored) Augello; (penalty scored) Ceccaroni

17 August 2025	Monza (2)	0–1	Frosinone (2)	Monza
18:00 CEST		Report	Kvernadze 90+2'	Stadium: Stadio Brianteo; Attendance: 2,797; Referee: Daniele Perenzoni

17 August 2025	Parma (1)	2–0	Pescara (2)	Parma
18:30 CEST	Pellegrino 47', 65'	Report		Stadium: Stadio Ennio Tardini; Attendance: 6,089; Referee: Valerio Crezzini

17 August 2025	Cesena (2)	0–0 (1–2 p)	Pisa (1)	Cesena
20:45 CEST		Report		Stadium: Stadio Dino Manuzzi; Attendance: 5,411; Referee: Davide Di Marco
	Penalties
	Diao (penalty missed); Shpendi (penalty scored); Adamo (penalty missed); Arrigoni (penalty missed); Bastoni (penalty missed)		(penalty scored) Cuadrado; (penalty missed) Touré; (penalty missed) Léris; (penalty missed) Canestrelli; (penalty scored) Nzola

17 August 2025	Milan (1)	2–0	Bari (2)	Milan
21:15 CEST	Leão 14'; Pulisic 48'	Report		Stadium: San Siro; Attendance: 71,061; Referee: Alberto Arena

18 August 2025	Audace Cerignola (3)	1–1 (2–4 p)	Hellas Verona (1)	Cerignola
18:00 CEST	Miguel Ángel 90+1'	Report	Bradarić 55'	Stadium: Stadio Domenico Monterisi; Attendance: 3,822; Referee: Luca Massimi
	Penalties
	Cretella (penalty scored); Russo (penalty missed); Faggioli (penalty missed); Miguel Ángel (penalty scored)		(penalty scored) Kastanos; (penalty scored) Sarr; (penalty scored) Livramento; (penalty missed) Santiago; (penalty scored) Serdar

18 August 2025	Spezia (2)	1–1 (4–2 p)	Sampdoria (2)	La Spezia
18:30 CEST	Artistico 36'	Report	Henderson 34'	Stadium: Stadio Alberto Picco; Attendance: 7,502; Referee: Luca Zufferli
	Penalties
	Soleri (penalty scored); Kouda (penalty scored); Hristov (penalty scored); Esposito (penalty scored)		(penalty missed) Henderson; (penalty scored) Çuni; (penalty scored) Narro; (penalty missed) Pedrola

18 August 2025	Udinese (1)	2–0	Carrarese (2)	Udine
20:45 CEST	Atta 43'; Bravo 59'	Report		Stadium: Stadio Friuli; Attendance: 7,402; Referee: Kevin Bonacina

18 August 2025	Torino (1)	1–0	Modena (2)	Turin
21:15 CEST	Vlašić 51'	Report		Stadium: Stadio Olimpico Grande Torino; Attendance: 12,533; Referee: Paride Tremolada

=== Second round ===
The 16 winning teams from the first round competed in the second round, with the eight winners advancing to the round of 16.

23 September 2025	Cagliari (1)	4–1	Frosinone (2)	Cagliari
17:00 CEST	Gaetano 2'; Borrelli 67'; Felici 80'; Cavuoti 85'	Report	Vergani 36'	Stadium: Unipol Domus; Attendance: 11,444; Referee: Ermanno Feliciani

23 September 2025	Udinese (1)	2–1	Palermo (2)	Udine
18:30 CEST	Zaniolo 41'; Miller 45'	Report	Peda 90+3'	Stadium: Stadio Friuli; Attendance: 6,686; Referee: Andrea Zanotti

23 September 2025	Milan (1)	3–0	Lecce (1)	Milan
21:00 CEST	Giménez 20'; Nkunku 51'; Pulisic 64'	Report		Stadium: San Siro; Attendance: 54,418; Referee: Paride Tremolada

24 September 2025	Parma (1)	2–2 (4–3 p)	Spezia (2)	Parma
17:00 CEST	Britschgi 26'; Pellegrino 45'	Report	Aurelio 44'; Lapadula 82'	Stadium: Stadio Ennio Tardini; Attendance: 3,428; Referee: Giuseppe Mucera
	Penalties
	Cutrone (penalty scored); Ndiaye (penalty scored); Bernabé (penalty scored); Circati (penalty missed); Ordóñez (penalty scored)		(penalty missed) Soleri; (penalty scored) Kouda; (penalty scored) Vlahović; (penalty missed) Lapadula; (penalty scored) Jack

24 September 2025	Hellas Verona (1)	0–0 (4–5 p)	Venezia (2)	Verona
18:30 CEST		Report		Stadium: Stadio Marcantonio Bentegodi; Attendance: 7,021; Referee: Andrea Calzavara
	Penalties
	Kastanos (penalty scored); Ebosse (penalty missed); Elmusrati (penalty scored); Giovane (penalty scored); Orban (penalty scored)		(penalty scored) Fila; (penalty scored) Yeboah; (penalty scored) Svoboda; (penalty scored) Bohinen; (penalty scored) Lella

24 September 2025	Como (1)	3–0	Sassuolo (1)	Como
21:00 CEST	Rodríguez 2', 41'; Douvikas 25'	Report		Stadium: Stadio Giuseppe Sinigaglia; Attendance: 5,212; Referee: Niccolò Turrini

25 September 2025	Genoa (1)	3–1	Empoli (2)	Genoa
18:30 CEST	Frendrup 15'; Marcandalli 56'; Ekhator 83'	Report	Saporiti 12'	Stadium: Stadio Luigi Ferraris; Attendance: 8,626; Referee: Federico Dionisi

25 September 2025	Torino (1)	1–0	Pisa (1)	Turin
21:00 CEST	Casadei 9'	Report		Stadium: Stadio Olimpico Grande Torino; Attendance: 9,427; Referee: Ivano Pezzuto

== Final stage ==
=== Bracket ===
Round of 16
Bologna	2
Parma	1
Lazio	1
Milan	0
Atalanta	4
Genoa	0
Juventus	2
Udinese	0
Inter	5
Venezia	1
Roma	2
Torino	3
Napoli (p)	1 (9)
Cagliari	1 (8)
Fiorentina	1
Como	3

Quarter-finals
Bologna	1 (1)
Lazio (p)	1 (4)
Atalanta	3
Juventus	0
Inter	2
Torino	1
Napoli	1 (6)
Como (p)	1 (7)

Semi-finals
Lazio (p)	2	1	3 (2)
Atalanta	2	1	3 (1)
Inter	0	3	3
Como	0	2	2

Final
Lazio	0
Inter	2

=== Round of 16 ===
The round of 16 matches were played between the eight winners from the second round and clubs seeded 1–8 in the 2024–25 Serie A.

2 December 2025	Juventus (1)	2–0	Udinese (1)	Turin
21:00 CET	Palma 23' (o.g.); Locatelli 68' (pen.)	Report		Stadium: Juventus Stadium; Attendance: 34,674; Referee: Francesco Fourneau

3 December 2025	Atalanta (1)	4–0	Genoa (1)	Bergamo
15:00 CET	Djimsiti 19'; De Roon 54'; Pašalić 82'; Ahanor 90+1'	Report		Stadium: Stadio Atleti Azzurri d'Italia; Attendance: 11,651; Referee: Mario Perri

3 December 2025	Napoli (1)	1–1 (9–8 p)	Cagliari (1)	Naples
18:00 CET	Lucca 28'	Report	Esposito 67'	Stadium: Stadio Diego Armando Maradona; Attendance: 45,000; Referee: Juan Luca Sacchi
	Penalties
	Politano (penalty scored); McTominay (penalty scored); Lang (penalty scored); Højlund (penalty scored); Neres (penalty missed); Elmas (penalty scored); Milinković-Savić (penalty scored); Spinazzola (penalty scored); Juan Jesus (penalty scored); Buongiorno (penalty scored)		(penalty scored) Obert; (penalty scored) Borrelli; (penalty scored) Prati; (penalty missed) Felici; (penalty scored) Esposito; (penalty scored) Luperto; (penalty scored) Adopo; (penalty scored) Idrissi; (penalty scored) De Pardo; (penalty missed) Luvumbo

3 December 2025	Inter (1)	5–1	Venezia (2)	Milan
21:00 CET	Diouf 18'; Esposito 20'; Thuram 34', 51'; Bonny 76'	Report	Sagrado 66'	Stadium: San Siro; Attendance: 44,910; Referee: Davide Di Marco

4 December 2025	Bologna (1)	2–1	Parma (1)	Bologna
18:00 CET	Rowe 38'; Castro 89'	Report	Benedyczak 13'	Stadium: Stadio Renato Dall'Ara; Attendance: 15,301; Referee: Paride Tremolada

4 December 2025	Lazio (1)	1–0	Milan (1)	Rome
21:00 CET	Zaccagni 80'	Report		Stadium: Stadio Olimpico; Attendance: 41,718; Referee: Marco Guida

13 January 2026	Roma (1)	2–3	Torino (1)	Rome
21:00 CET	Hermoso 46'; Arena 81'	Report	Adams 35', 52'; İlkhan 90'	Stadium: Stadio Olimpico; Attendance: 60,538; Referee: Kevin Bonacina

27 January 2026	Fiorentina (1)	1–3	Como (1)	Florence
21:00 CET	Piccoli 7'	Report	Roberto 20'; Paz 60'; Morata 90+1'	Stadium: Stadio Artemio Franchi; Attendance: 10,472; Referee: Giovanni Ayroldi

=== Quarter-finals ===
The quarter-final matches were played between clubs advancing from the round of 16.

4 February 2026	Inter (1)	2–1	Torino (1)	Monza (Note: Inter did not play the match at their usual home stadium San Siro, Milan, as it was being used in preparations for the 2026 Winter Olympics opening ceremony.)
21:00 CET	Bonny 35'; Diouf 47'	Report	Kulenović 57'	Stadium: Stadio Brianteo; Attendance: 12,038; Referee: Matteo Marchetti

5 February 2026	Atalanta (1)	3–0	Juventus (1)	Bergamo
21:00 CET	Scamacca 27' (pen.); Sulemana 77'; Pašalić 85'	Report		Stadium: Stadio Atleti Azzurri d'Italia; Attendance: 22,623; Referee: Michael Fabbri

10 February 2026	Napoli (1)	1–1 (6–7 p)	Como (1)	Naples
21:00 CET	Vergara 46'	Report	Baturina 39' (pen.)	Stadium: Stadio Diego Armando Maradona; Attendance: 50,000; Referee: Gianluca Manganiello
	Penalties
	Politano (penalty scored); Lukaku (penalty missed); Spinazzola (penalty scored); Alisson (penalty scored); Elmas (penalty scored); Milinković-Savić (penalty scored); Gutiérrez (penalty scored); Lobotka (penalty missed)		(penalty scored) Da Cunha; (penalty scored) Douvikas; (penalty scored) Baturina; (penalty missed) Perrone; (penalty scored) Smolčić; (penalty scored) Diego Carlos; (penalty scored) Vojvoda; (penalty scored) Kempf

11 February 2026	Bologna (1)	1–1 (1–4 p)	Lazio (1)	Bologna
21:00 CET	Castro 30'	Report	Noslin 48'	Stadium: Stadio Renato Dall'Ara; Attendance: 17,249; Referee: Daniele Chiffi
	Penalties
	Ferguson (penalty missed); Dallinga (penalty scored); Orsolini (penalty missed)		(penalty scored) Tavares; (penalty scored) Dia; (penalty scored) Marušić; (penalty scored) Taylor

=== Semi-finals ===
The two-legged semi-finals were played between clubs advancing from the quarter-finals.

==== Summary ====
Team 1	Agg.	Team 2	1st leg	2nd leg
Como (1)	2–3	Inter (1)	0–0	2–3
Lazio (1)	3–3 (2–1 p)	Atalanta (1)	2–2	1–1 (a.e.t.)

==== Matches ====
3 March 2026
21:00 CET

Como (1)	0–0	Inter (1)
	Report

Stadio Giuseppe Sinigaglia, Como
Attendance: 10,324
Referee: Marco Di Bello
21 April 2026
21:00 CEST

Inter (1)	3–2	Como (1)
Çalhanoğlu 69', 86'; Sučić 89'	Report	Baturina 32'; Da Cunha 48'

San Siro, Milan
Attendance: 73,255
Referee: Simone Sozza

Inter won 3–2 on aggregate.

4 March 2026
21:00 CET

Lazio (1)	2–2	Atalanta (1)
Dele-Bashiru 47'; Dia 87'	Report	Pašalić 51'; Musah 89'

Stadio Olimpico, Rome
Attendance: 5,000
Referee: Gianluca Manganiello
22 April 2026
21:00 CEST

Atalanta (1)	1–1 (a.e.t.)	Lazio (1)
Pašalić 86'	Report	Romagnoli 84'
Penalties
Raspadori (penalty scored); Scamacca (penalty missed); Zappacosta (penalty missed); Pašalić (penalty missed); De Ketelaere (penalty missed)	1–2	(penalty missed) Tavares; (penalty missed) Cataldi; (penalty scored) Isaksen; (penalty scored) Taylor

Stadio Atleti Azzurri d'Italia, Bergamo
Attendance: 21,915
Referee: Andrea Colombo

3–3 on aggregate. Lazio won 2–1 on penalties.

=== Final ===
13 May 2026
21:00 CEST

Lazio	0–2	Internazionale
	Report	Marušić 14' (o.g.); L. Martínez 35'

Stadio Olimpico, Rome
Attendance: 68,729
Referee: Marco Guida

== Top goalscorers ==
Rank	Player	Club	Goals
1	(Croatia) Mario Pašalić	Atalanta	4
2	(Greece) Anastasios Douvikas	Como	3
2	(Argentina) Mateo Pellegrino	Parma	3
4	(Scotland) Ché Adams	Torino	2
4	(Croatia) Martin Baturina	Como	2
4	(France) Ange-Yoan Bonny	Inter Milan	2
4	(Turkey) Hakan Çalhanoğlu	Inter Milan	2
4	(Argentina) Santiago Castro	Bologna	2
4	(France) Lucas Da Cunha	Como	2
4	(France) Andy Diouf	Inter Milan	2
4	(Italy) Issa Doumbia	Venezia	2
4	(Italy) Roberto Piccoli	Cagliari / Fiorentina	2
4	(United States) Christian Pulisic	Milan	2
4	(Spain) Jesús Rodríguez	Como	2
4	(France) Marcus Thuram	Inter Milan	2
4	(Ecuador) John Yeboah	Venezia	2
