= 2025–26 Cagliari Calcio season =

Cagliari Calcio
2025–26 season
- President: Tommaso Giulini
- Head Coach: Fabio Pisacane
- Stadium: Unipol Domus
Home colours	Away colours	Third colours

The 2025–26 season is the 106th season in the history of the Cagliari Calcio, and their third consecutive season in Serie A. The team played both in the domestic league and the Coppa Italia.

== Squad ==
As of 29 March 2026

Note: Flags indicate national team as defined under FIFA eligibility rules; some limited exceptions apply. Players may hold more than one non-FIFA nationality.

No.	Pos.	Nation	Player
1	GK	ITA	Elia Caprile (5th captain)
2	DF	ITA	Marco Palestra (on loan from Atalanta)
3	DF	ITA	Riyad Idrissi
4	MF	ITA	Luca Mazzitelli (on loan from Como)
8	MF	FRA	Michel Adopo
9	FW	TUR	Semih Kılıçsoy (on loan from Beşiktaş)
10	MF	ITA	Gianluca Gaetano
12	GK	ALB	Alen Sherri
14	MF	ITA	Alessandro Deiola (vice-captain)
15	DF	URU	Juan Rodríguez
17	FW	ITA	Mattia Felici
18	DF	NED	Othniël Raterink
19	FW	ITA	Andrea Belotti
20	FW	URU	Agustin Albarracin

No.	Pos.	Nation	Player
22	DF	ITA	Alberto Dossena (on loan from Como)
24	GK	ITA	Giuseppe Ciocci
25	MF	GHA	Ibrahim Sulemana (on loan from Atalanta)
26	DF	COL	Yerry Mina (3rd captain)
27	MF	ZAM	Joseph Liteta
28	DF	ITA	Gabriele Zappa (4th captain)
29	FW	ITA	Gennaro Borrelli
30	FW	ITA	Leonardo Pavoletti (captain)
32	DF	POR	Zé Pedro
33	DF	SVK	Adam Obert
37	FW	FRA	Yael Trepy
90	MF	ITA	Michael Folorunsho (on loan from Napoli)
94	FW	ITA	Sebastiano Esposito (on loan from Inter Milan)

== Transfers ==
=== Summer window ===
==== In ====
Date	Pos.	Player	From	Fee	Notes	Ref.
30 June 2025	GK	(Serbia) Boris Radunović	(Italy) Bari	Free	Loan return	
30 June 2025	DF	(Italy) Alessandro Di Pardo	(Italy) Modena	Free	Loan return	
30 June 2025	DF	(Italy) Riyad Idrissi	(Italy) Modena	Free	Loan return	
30 June 2025	MF	(Italy) Nicolò Cavuoti	(Italy) Feralpisalò	Free	Loan return	
30 June 2025	MF	(Croatia) Marko Rog	(Croatia) Dinamo Zagreb	Free	Loan return	
1 July 2025	GK	(Italy) Elia Caprile	(Italy) Napoli	€8,200,000	From loan to permanent transfer	
1 July 2025	MF	(France) Michel Adopo	(Italy) Atalanta	€3,800,000	From loan to permanent transfer	
1 July 2025	MF	(Italy) Gianluca Gaetano	(Italy) Napoli	€6,200,000	From loan to permanent transfer	
10 July 2025	FW	(Italy) Gennaro Borrelli	(Italy) Brescia	Free		
25 August 2025	FW	(Italy) Roberto Piccoli	(Italy) Atalanta	€12,500,000	Option to buy activated	
31 August 2025	DF	(Portugal) Zé Pedro	(Portugal) Porto	€2,000,000		
1 September 2025	DF	(Uruguay) Juan Rodríguez	(Uruguay) Peñarol	€4,000,000		
1 September 2025	FW	(Italy) Andrea Belotti	(Italy) Como	Free		

==== Loans in ====
Date	Pos.	Player	From	Fee	Notes	Ref.
3 August 2025	FW	(Turkey) Semih Kılıçsoy	(Turkey) Beşiktaş	€1,000,000	Option to buy for €12,000,000	
24 July 2025	MF	(Italy) Michael Folorunsho	(Italy) Napoli	€500,000	Option to buy for €8,000,000	
30 July 2025	MF	(Italy) Luca Mazzitelli	(Italy) Como	Free	Option to buy for €2,000,000 + €300,000 bonus	
12 August 2025	FW	(Italy) Sebastiano Esposito	(Italy) Inter Milan	Free	Option to buy for €4,000,000	
26 August 2025	DF	(Italy) Marco Palestra	(Italy) Atalanta	Free		

==== Out ====
Date	Pos.	Player	To	Fee	Notes	Ref.
30 June 2025	FW	(Italy) Roberto Piccoli	(Italy) Atalanta	Free	End of loan	
30 June 2025	FW	(Romania) Florinel Coman	(Qatar) Al-Gharafa	Free	End of loan	
1 July 2025	DF	(Greece) Pantelis Chatzidiakos	(Denmark) Copenhagen	€1,500,000	From loan to permanent transfer	
1 July 2025	MF	(Italy) Nicolas Viola	Free agent	Free	End of contract	
2 July 2025	MF	(Republic of the Congo) Antoine Makoumbou	(Turkey) Samsunspor	€1,500,000		
4 July 2025	DF	(Italy) Luigi Palomba	(Italy) Virtus Entella	Undisclosed		
8 July 2025	DF	(Italy) Tommaso Augello	(Italy) Palermo	Free		
16 July 2025	DF	(Argentina) José Luis Palomino	(Argentina) Talleres de Córdoba	Free		
23 July 2025	DF	(Italy) Etienne Catena	(Italy) Siracusa	Undisclosed		
23 July 2025	MF	(Romania) Răzvan Marin	(Greece) AEK Athens	€1,700,000		
23 July 2025	GK	(Italy) Simone Scuffet	(Italy) Pisa	€900,000		
20 August 2025	DF	(Italy) Nadir Zortea	(Italy) Bologna	€7,500,000		
21 August 2025	MF	(Czech Republic) Jakub Jankto	Retired			
25 August 2025	FW	(Italy) Roberto Piccoli	(Italy) Fiorentina	€25,000,000		

==== Loans out ====
Date	Pos.	Player	To	Fee	Notes	Ref.
1 July 2025	FW	(Zambia) Kingstone Mutandwa	(Austria) Ried	Free	Option to buy for an undisclosed fee + buy-back option for an undisclosed fee	
10 July 2025	GK	(Albania) Alen Sherri	(Italy) Frosinone	Free	Option to buy for an undisclosed fee + buy-back option for an undisclosed fee	
30 July 2025	DF	(Poland) Mateusz Wieteska	(Turkey) Kocaelispor	Free	Option to buy for an undisclosed fee	
1 August 2025	FW	(Slovenia) Nik Prelec	(England) Oxford United	Free	Option to buy for an undisclosed fee + obligation to buy under certain conditions	
22 August 2025	DF	(Italy) Davide Veroli	(Italy) Palermo	Free	Option to buy for an undisclosed fee + obligation to buy under certain conditions	
28 August 2025	GK	(Bulgaria) Velizar-Iliya Iliev	(Italy) Audace Cerignola	Free		

=== Winter window ===
==== In ====
Date	Pos.	Player	From	Fee	Notes	Ref.
4 January 2026	GK	(Albania) Alen Sherri	(Italy) Frosinone	Free	Loan terminated early	
19 January 2026	GK	(Italy) Alessandro Vinciguerra	(Italy) Pescara	Free	Loan terminated early	
27 January 2026	FW	(Uruguay) Agustín Albarracín	(Uruguay) Boston River	€2,000,000		
29 January 2026	DF	(Italy) Sebastiano Di Paolo	(Italy) Siracusa	€300,000		
29 January 2026	DF	(Mali) Francesco Gallea	(Italy) Lumezzane	Undisclosed		
30 January 2026	DF	(Netherlands) Othniël Raterink	(Netherlands) De Graafschap	€1,100,000		

==== Loans in ====
Date	Pos.	Player	From	Fee	Notes	Ref.
21 January 2026	DF	(Italy) Alberto Dossena	(Italy) Como	Free		
21 January 2026	MF	(Ghana) Ibrahim Sulemana	(Italy) Atalanta	Free	Option to buy for €11,000,000	

==== Out ====
Date	Pos.	Player	To	Fee	Notes	Ref.
15 January 2026	MF	(Croatia) Marko Rog	Free agent	Free	Contract terminated	
29 January 2026	DF	(Italy) Alessandro Di Pardo	(Italy) Sampdoria	€200,000		
2 February 2026	DF	(Italy) Sebastiano Luperto	(Italy) Cremonese	€4,600,000		

==== Loans out ====
Date	Pos.	Player	To	Fee	Notes	Ref.
4 January 2026	GK	(Serbia) Boris Radunović	(Italy) Spezia	Free	Option to buy for an undisclosed fee	
20 January 2026	FW	(Italy) Alessandro Vinciguerra	(Italy) Monopoli	Free		
28 January 2026	MF	(Italy) Nicolò Cavuoti	(Italy) Bari	Free		
30 January 2026	DF	(Italy) Sebastiano Di Paolo	(Italy) Siracusa	Free		
30 January 2026	DF	(Mali) Francesco Gallea	(Italy) Lumezzane	Free		
30 January 2026	MF	(Italy) Matteo Prati	(Italy) Torino	€300,000	Option to buy for €7,000,000	
2 February 2026	DF	(Italy) Nicola Pintus	(Italy) Cosenza	Free		
2 February 2026	FW	(Angola) Zito Luvumbo	(Spain) Mallorca	€300,000	Option to buy for €4,000,000	

== Friendlies ==
19 July 2025 Friendly	(Italy) Cagliari	3–1	(Italy) Ospitaletto

23 July 2025 Summer Series Upper Austria	Galatasaray (Turkey)	3–1	(Italy) Cagliari	Linz, Austria
20:30 TRT (UTC+3)	Sallai 20'; Yılmaz 30'; Ünyay 58'	https://www.galatasaray.org/haber/futbol/galatasaray-3-1-cagliari/58170 Report 3	Adopo 16'	Stadium: Raiffeisen Arena; Attendance: 8,000; Referee: Sebastian Gishamer

26 July 2025 Friendly	Hannover 96 (Germany)	2–0	(Italy) Cagliari	Hanover
14:00 CEST (UTC+2)	Tomiak 17' (pen.); Neubauer 86'	Report		Stadium: Heinz von Heiden Arena; Attendance: 11,600; Referee: Lukas Benen

2 August 2025 Friendly	(Italy) Cagliari	1–0	(France) AS Saint-Étienne

9 August 2025 Friendly	(Spain) Racing de Santander	1–1	(Italy) Cagliari

== Competitions ==
=== Serie A ===
==== League table ====
Pos	Team	Pld	W	D	L	GF	GA	GD	Pts	Qualification or relegation
14	Fiorentina	38	9	15	14	41	50	−9	42	
15	Genoa	38	10	11	17	41	51	−10	41	
16	Cagliari	38	11	10	17	40	53	−13	43	
17	Lecce	38	10	8	20	28	50	−22	38	
18	Cremonese (R)	38	8	10	20	32	57	−25	34	Relegation to Serie B

Updated to match(es) played on 24 May 2026. Source: Serie A
Rules for classification: 1) Points; 2) Tiebreaker for Champions team and third relegated team; 3) Head-to-head points; 4) Head-to-head goal difference; 5) Goal difference; 6) Goals scored; 7) Draw.
(Note: Head-to-head record is used only after all the matches between the teams in question have been played)
(R) Relegated

==== Matches ====
24 August 2025 1	Cagliari	1–1	Fiorentina	Cagliari
18:30 CEST (UTC+2)	Obert (yellow card) 43'; Borrelli (yellow card) 45+1'; Mazzitelli (yellow card) 82'; Luperto 90+4'; Kılıçsoy (yellow card) 90+7'	Report	Mandragora 68'; Pongračić (yellow card) 71'; Marí (yellow card) 79'	Stadium: Unipol Domus; Attendance: 15,723; Referee: Simone Sozza

30 August 2025 2	Napoli	1–0	Cagliari	Naples
20:45 CEST (UTC+2)	De Bruyne (yellow card) 52'; Juan Jesus (yellow card) 67'; Zambo Anguissa 90+5'	Report	Zappa (yellow card) 5'	Stadium: Stadio Diego Armando Maradona; Attendance: 50,497; Referee: Kevin Bonacina

13 September 2025 3	Cagliari	2–0	Parma Calcio 1913	Cagliari
	Mina 33'; Felici 77'	Report		Stadium: Unipol Domus; Referee: Francesco Fourneau

19 September 2025 4	Lecce	1–2	Cagliari	Lecce
20:45 CEST (UTC+2)	Gabriel 5', (yellow card) 20'; Coulibaly (yellow card) 26'	Report	Belotti 33', 71' (pen.); Esposito (yellow card) 45'; Prati (yellow card) 58'; Obert (yellow card) 81'	Stadium: Stadio Via del mare Referee: Luca Zufferli

27 September 2025 5	Cagliari	0–2	Internazionale	Cagliari
20:45 CEST (UTC+2)		Report	L. Martínez 9'; Carlos Augusto (yellow card) 45'; Barella (yellow card) 59'; Esposito 82'	Stadium: Unipol Domus; Attendance: 16,000; Referee: Marco Piccinini

5 October 2025 6	Udinese Calcio	1–1	Cagliari	Udine
	Kabasele 58'	Report	Borelli 25'	Stadium: Stadio Friuli; Referee: Alberto Ruben Arena

19 October 2025 7	Cagliari	0–2	Bologna	Cagliari
15:00 CEST (UTC+2)	Esposito (yellow card) 76'	Report	Miranda (yellow card) 13'; Holm 31'; Ferguson (yellow card) 62'; Orsolini 80'; Lykogiannis (yellow card) 90+2'	Stadium: Unipol Domus; Attendance: 16,168; Referee: Matteo Marchetti

26 October 2025 8	Hellas Verona	2–2	Cagliari	Verona
15:00 CEST (UTC+2)	Gagliardini 23'; Akpa Akpro (yellow card) 41'; Gagliardini (yellow card) 53'; Nelsson (yellow card) 57'; Orban 59'	Report	Obert (yellow card) 65'; Pavoletti (yellow card) 66'; Idrissi 77'; Mazzitelli (yellow card) 89'; Felici 90+2'; Borrelli (yellow card) 90+4'	Stadium: Stadio Marcantonio Bentegodi; Attendance: 24,344; Referee: Federico Dionisi

30 October 2025 9	Cagliari	1–2	US Sassuolo Calcio	Cagliari
	Esposito 73'	Report	Laurienté 54'; Pinamonti 65'	Stadium: Unipol Domus; Referee: Luca Pairetto

3 November 2025 10	Lazio	2–0	Cagliari	Rome
20:45 CET (UTC+1)	Isaksen 65'; Zaccagni 90+1'	Report	Gaetano (yellow card) 46'; Felici (yellow card) 59'	Stadium: Stadio Olimpico; Attendance: 35,000; Referee: Juan Luca Sacchi

8 November 2025 11	Como	0–0	Cagliari	Como
15:00 CET (UTC+1)	Addai (yellow card) 60'; Morata (yellow card) 62'; Perrone (yellow card) 89'	Report	Prati (yellow card) 70'	Stadium: Stadio Giuseppe Sinigaglia; Referee: Ivan Pezzuto

22 November 2025 12	Cagliari	3–3	Genoa CFC	Cagliari
	Borelli 33', 60'; Esposito 43'	Report	Vitinha 18'; Østigård 41'; Martín 83'	Stadium: Unipol Domus; Referee: Federico La Penna

29 November 2025 13	Juventus	2–1	Cagliari	Turin
18:00 CET (UTC+1)	Yıldız 27', 45+1'; Cambiaso (yellow card) 83'	Report	Esposito 26'; Obert (yellow card) 39'; Folorunsho (yellow card) 63'; Felici (yellow card) 81'; Prati (yellow card) 82'; Deiola (yellow card) 90+3'	Stadium: Juventus Stadium; Attendance: 39,282; Referee: Valerio Crezzini

7 December 2025 14	Cagliari	1–0	Roma	Cagliari
15:00 CET (UTC+1)	Folorunsho (yellow card) 78'; Gaetano 82', (yellow card) 83'	Report	Çelik (red card) 52'; Hermoso (yellow card) 78'	Stadium: Unipol Domus; Attendance: 16,255; Referee: Luca Zufferli

13 December 2025 15	Atalanta	2–1	Cagliari	Bergamo
20:45 CET (UTC+1)	Scamacca 11', 81'; Bernasconi (yellow card) 33'	Report	Rodríguez (yellow card) 57'; Gaetano 75', (yellow card) 76'	Stadium: Gewiss Stadium; Attendance: 21,695; Referee: Davide Di Marco

21 December 2025 16	Cagliari Calcio	2–2	Pisa SC	Cagliari
	Folorunsho 59'; Kılıçsoy 71'	Report	Tramoni 45' (.pen); Moreo 89'	Stadium: Unipol Domus; Referee: Francesco Fourneau

27 December 2025 17	Torino FC	1–2	Cagliari Calcio	Turin
	Vlašić 27'	Report	Prati 45'; Kılıçsoy 66'	Referee: Daniele Doveri

2 January 2026 18	Cagliari	0–1	Milan	Cagliari
20:45 CET (UTC+1)	Idrissi (yellow card) 83'; Palestra (yellow card) 90+1'	Report	Leão 50'; Saelemaekers (yellow card) 90+1'	Stadium: Unipol Domus; Attendance: 16,412; Referee: Rosario Abisso

8 January 2026 19	Cremonese	2–2	Cagliari	Cremona
15:00 CET	Johnsen 4'; Vardy 29'	Report	Adopo 51'; Trepy 88'	Stadium: Stadio Giovanni Zini

12 January 2026 20	Genoa	3–0	Cagliari	Stadio Luigi Ferraris
	Colombo 7'; Frendrup 75'; Østigård 78'			Referee: eFederico La Penna

17 January 2026 21	Cagliari	1–0	Juventus	Cagliari
20:45 CET (UTC+1)	Mazzitelli 65'	Report	Yıldız (yellow card) 31'	Stadium: Unipol Domus; Attendance: 16,412; Referee: Davide Massa

24 January 2026 22	Fiorentina	1–2	Cagliari	Florence
18:00 CET (UTC+1)	Pongračić (yellow card) 56'; Brescianini 74'; Comuzzo (yellow card) 90+1'	Report	Kılıçsoy 31'; Palestra 47'; Caprile (yellow card) 63'; Mina (yellow card) 85'; Zé Pedro (yellow card) 87'	Stadium: Stadio Artemio Franchi; Attendance: 20,456; Referee: Marco Guida

31 January 2026 23	Caligari	4–0	Hellas Verona	Unipol Domus
	Mazzitelli 36'; Kılıçsoy 45+2'; Sulemana 84'; Idrissi 90+1'		Sarr (yellow card) (red card)	Referee: Kevin Bonacina

9 February 2026 24	Roma	2–0	Cagliari	Rome
20:45 CET (UTC+1)	Malen 25', 65'; Mancini (yellow card) 58'; Zaragoza (yellow card) 82'	Report	Dossena (yellow card) 5'; Palestra (yellow card) 40'; Gaetano (yellow card) 61'; Idrissi (yellow card) 89'	Stadium: Stadio Olimpico; Attendance: 60,334; Referee: Matteo Marcenaro

16 February 2026 25	Cagliari	0–2	Lecce	Cagliari
20:45 CET (UTC+1)		Report	Gandelman 65'; Ramadani 76'	Stadium: Unipol Domus; Attendance: 16,133; Referee: Ermanno Feliciani

21 February 2026 26	Cagliari	0–0	Lazio	Cagliari
20:45 CET (UTC+1)	Mina (yellow card) 25' (yellow-red card) 85'; Zé Pedro (yellow card) 56'	Report	Pellegrini (yellow card) 45+1'; Provstgaard (yellow card) 64'	Stadium: Unipol Domus; Attendance: 15,262; Referee: Antonio Rapuano

27 February 2026 27	Parma	1–1	Cagliari	Stadio Ennio Tardini
	Oristanio 83'		Folorunsho 62'	Referee: Luca Massimi

7 March 2026 28	Cagliari	1–2	Como	Cagliari
15:00 CET (UTC+1)	S. Esposito 56'	Report	Baturina 14'; Da Cunha 76'	Stadium: Unipol Domus; Referee: Livio Marinelli

15 March 2026 29	Pisa SC	3–1	Cagliari	Arena Garibaldi – Stadio Romeo Anconetani
	Moreo 9' (pen.); Durosinmi (red card) 37'; Caracciolo 52', 54'		Pavoletti 67'; Obert (yellow card) (red card) 81'	Referee: Federico La Penna

20 March 2026 30	Cagliari	0–1	Napoli	Cagliari
18:30 CET (UTC+1)	Zé Pedro (yellow card) 35'; Dossena (yellow card) 90+4'	Report	McTominay 2'; Lobotka (yellow card) 17'; Olivera (yellow card) 69'	Stadium: Unipol Domus; Attendance: 15,620; Referee: Maurizio Mariani

4 April 2026 31	Sassuolo	2–1	Cagliari
	Garcia 50'; Pinamonti 78'		Esposito 30' (pen.)

12 April 2026 32	Cagliari	1–0	Cremonese	Cagliari
15:00 CEST	Esposito 63'	Report		Stadium: Unipol Domus; Attendance: 16,412; Referee: Daniele Doveri

17 April 2026 33	Internazionale	3–0	Cagliari	Milan
20:45 CEST (UTC+2)	Thuram 52'; Barella 56'; Zieliński 90+2'	Report	S. Esposito (yellow card) 23'; Borrelli (yellow card) 25'	Stadium: San Siro; Attendance: 74,209; Referee: Matteo Marchetti

27 April 2026 34	Cagliari	3–2	Atalanta	Cagliari
18:30 CEST (UTC+2)	Mendy 1', 8'; Borrelli 47'	Report	Scamacca 40', 45'	Stadium: Unipol Domus; Referee: Juan Luca Sacchi

3 May 2026 35	Bologna	0–0	Cagliari
		Report		Referee: Valerio Crezzini

10 May 2026 36	Cagliari	0–2	Udinese	Unipol Domus
		Report	Buksa 56'; Gueye 90+6'	Attendance: 16,120; Referee: Federico Dionisi

17 May 2026 37	Cagliari	2–1	Torino	Unipol Domus
	Esposito 39'; Mina 45+3'	Report	Obrador 37'	Referee: Alberto Arena

24 May 2026 38	Milan	1–2	Cagliari	Milan
--:-- CEST (UTC+2)	Saelemaekers 2'	Report	Borrelli 20'; Rodríguez 57'	Stadium: San Siro; Referee: Marco Guida

=== Coppa Italia ===
16 August 2025	Cagliari	1–1 (5–4 p)	Virtus Entella	Cagliari
20:45 CEST	Piccoli 45'	Report	Deiola 87' (o.g.)	Stadium: Unipol Domus; Attendance: 15,748; Referee: Mario Perr
	Penalties
	Mina (penalty scored); Ndary Adopo (penalty missed); Kılıçsoy (penalty scored); Folorunsho (penalty scored); Esposito (penalty scored); Cavuoti (penalty scored)		(penalty scored) Russo; (penalty scored) Castelli; (penalty missed) Karić; (penalty scored) Debenedetti; (penalty scored) Tiritiello; (penalty missed) Marconi

23 September 2025	Cagliari	4–1	Frosinone	Cagliari
17:00 CEST	Gaetano 2'; Borrelli 67'; Felici 80'; Cavuoti 85'	Report	Vergani 36'	Stadium: Unipol Domus; Attendance: 11,444; Referee: Ermanno Feliciani

3 December 2025	Napoli (1)	1–1 (9–8 p)	Cagliari (1)	Naples
18:00 CET	Lucca 28'	Report	Esposito 67'	Stadium: Stadio Diego Armando Maradona; Attendance: 45,000; Referee: Juan Luca Sacchi
	Penalties
	Politano (penalty scored); McTominay (penalty scored); Lang (penalty scored); Højlund (penalty scored); Neres (penalty missed); Elmas (penalty scored); Milinković-Savić (penalty scored); Spinazzola (penalty scored); Juan Jesus (penalty scored); Buongiorno (penalty scored)		(penalty scored) Obert; (penalty scored) Borrelli; (penalty scored) Prati; (penalty missed) Felici; (penalty scored) Esposito; (penalty scored) Luperto; (penalty scored) Adopo; (penalty scored) Idrissi; (penalty scored) De Pardo; (penalty missed) Luvumbo
