= Yael Trepy =

French footballer (born 2006)

Personal information
- Full name: Yael Fritz Junior Trepy
- Date of birth: 20 May 2006 (age 20)
- Place of birth: Villeneuve-Saint-Georges, France
- Height: 1.91 m (6 ft 3 in)
- Position: Forward

Team information
- Current team: Cagliari
- Number: 19

Youth career
- US Créteil-Lusitanos
- 2022–2025: Cagliari

Senior career*
Years	Team	Apps	(Gls)
2025–	Cagliari	8	(1)
- * Club domestic league appearances and goals as of 25 May 2026

Yael Fritz Junior Trepy (born 20 May 2006) is a French professional footballer who plays as a forward for Serie A club Cagliari.

== Career ==
Born in Villeneuve-Saint-Georges, Trepy is a youth product of US Créteil-Lusitanos, where he was scouted by Pierluigi Carta during an under-17 game, joining the academy of Cagliari in 2022.

In August 2024, he signed his first professional contract with Cagliari, proving to be a standout with Fabio Pisacane's Primavera, whom he helped win the 2025 Coppa Italia Primavera, as he scored in the final, a 3–0 beating of AC Milan.

During the 2025–26 season, Fabio Pisacane stepped up as manager for the first team. Trepy was part of the youth players who followed Pisacane to the senior squad., along the likes of Joseph Liteta, Alessandro Vinciguerra, Nicola Pintus and Ivan Sulev.

Trepy made his professional debut with Cagliari in a 2–2 Serie A away draw with US Cremonese on 8 January 2026. Coming on for his captain Gabriele Zappa on the 84th minute, as his team trailed 2–1, he scored a late equalizer only 4 minutes later, earning him the man of the match award and making him the first under-20 French player to score on his debut in a Top 4 league in the 21st century.

== Style of play ==
A left-footed centre-forward, he is also able to play as a second striker or right winger, CagliariToday describes Trepy as an athletic player, very tall and physical, but still showing great technique and agility.

Wearing the number 10 as a youth player, his style has been compared to the likes of French international Thierry Henry.

== Personal life ==
Born in France and raised in Italy, Trepy holds dual French and Italian citizenship. In August 2026, Trepy fell into a coma after nearly drowning in a swimming pool in Porto Cervo. He was rescued and airlifted to a hospital in Sassari, where doctors placed him in a medically induced coma after finding significant fluid in his lungs. He reportedly woke from his coma on August 18 and is initially set to continue receiving intensive medical care.
