= Paul Mendy =

Senegalese footballer (born 2007)

Personal information
- Date of birth: 13 January 2007 (age 19)
- Place of birth: Rufisque, Senegal
- Height: 1.96 m (6 ft 5 in)
- Position: Forward

Team information
- Current team: Cagliari
- Number: 31

Youth career
- AS Bambey
- 2025-2026: Cagliari

Senior career*
Years	Team	Apps	(Gls)
2026–	Cagliari	20	(3)

International career^{‡}
2026–	Senegal	2	(1)
- * Club domestic league appearances and goals as of 17:51, 7 November 2026 (UTC) ‡ National team caps and goals as of 23:59, 16 November 2026 (UTC)

Paul Mendy (born 13 January 2007) is a Senegalese professional footballer who plays as a forward for Serie A club Cagliari and the Senegal national team.

== Club career ==
Born in Rufisque, in the Dakar region of Senegal, Mendy is a youth product of Salam Academy Foot and AS Bambey, where he impressed with the Ligue 2 club.

In February 2025, he signed for Cagliari in Serie A.

With the Sardinian club, he first was a standout with the Primavera team during the 2025–26 season, before signing a new contract with the club in March 2026.

Having started to feature on the bench with Fabio Pisacane's first team since early February 2026, Mendy made his professional debut with Cagliari in a 1–0 Serie A loss to Napoli on 20 March 2026.

== Career statistics ==
=== Club ===
As of match played 7 November 2026

Appearances and goals by club, season and competition
Club	Season	League			National cup		League cup		Continental		Other		Total	
Club	Season	Division	Apps	Goals	Apps	Goals	Apps	Goals	Apps	Goals	Apps	Goals	Apps	Goals
Cagliari	2025–26	Serie A	9	2	—		—		—		—		9	2
Cagliari	2026–27	Serie A	11	1	2	1	—		—		—		13	2
Career total			20	3	2	1	0	0	0	0	0	0	22	4

=== International ===
As of match played 16 November 2026

Appearances and goals by national team and year
National team	Year	Apps	Goals
Senegal	2026	2	1
Total		2	1

Senegal score listed first, score column indicates score after each Mendy goal.

List of international goals scored by Paul Mendy
No.	Date	Venue	Opponent	Score	Result	Competition
1	16 November 2026	Juba National Stadium, Juba, South Sudan	Sudan	4–2	4–2	2027 Africa Cup of Nations qualification
