= Agustín Albarracín =

Uruguayan footballer (born 2005)

Personal information
- Full name: Agustín Albarracín Basil
- Date of birth: 29 August 2005 (age 21)
- Place of birth: Montevideo, Uruguay
- Height: 1.74 m (5 ft 9 in)
- Position: Forward

Team information
- Current team: Albacete (on loan from Cagliari)
- Number: 32

Youth career
- Montevideo Wanderers

Senior career*
Years	Team	Apps	(Gls)
2023–2024	Montevideo Wanderers	41	(2)
2025–2026	Boston River	28	(9)
2026–	Cagliari	2	(0)
2026–	→ Albacete (loan)	8	(0)

International career
2024–2025	Uruguay U20	24	(6)
- * Club domestic league appearances and goals as of 16 November 2026

Agustín Albarracín Basil (born 29 August 2005) is a Uruguayan professional footballer who plays as a forward for Segunda División club Albacete, on loan from Serie A club Cagliari.

== Club career ==
Albarracín is a youth academy graduate of Montevideo Wanderers. He made his professional debut for the club on 24 June 2023 in a goalless draw against Peñarol. In December 2024, he joined Boston River.

On 27 January 2026, Albarracín signed a four-and-a-half-year contract with Serie A club Cagliari. On 25 August 2026, he joined Spanish club Albacete on a season long loan deal.

== International career ==
In January 2024, Albarracín was called up by the Uruguay under-23 team head coach Marcelo Bielsa to replace injured Rodrigo Dudok in the squad for the 2024 CONMEBOL Pre-Olympic Tournament. However, he remained as an unused substitute throughout the tournament as Uruguay were eliminated in the group stage.

In January 2025, Albarracín was named in the Uruguay under-20 squad for the 2025 South American U-20 Championship.

== Personal life ==
Albarracín is the younger brother of professional footballer Nicolás Albarracín.

== Career statistics ==
As of match played 9 May 2026

Appearances and goals by club, season and competition
Club	Season	League			Cup		Continental		Total	
Club	Season	Division	Apps	Goals	Apps	Goals	Apps	Goals	Apps	Goals
Montevideo Wanderers	2023	Liga AUF Uruguaya	18	1	2	0	—		20	1
Montevideo Wanderers	2024	Liga AUF Uruguaya	23	1	0	0	1 (Note: Appearance in Copa Sudamericana)	0	24	1
Montevideo Wanderers	Total		41	2	2	0	1	0	44	2
Boston River	2025	Liga AUF Uruguaya	28	9	1	0	4 (Note: One appearance in Copa Libertadores; three appearances, two goals in Copa Sudamericana)	2	33	11
Cagliari	2025–26	Serie A	2	0	—		—		2	0
Cagliari	2026–27	Serie A	0	0	0	0	—		0	0
Cagliari	Total		2	0	0	0	0	0	2	0
Albacete (loan)	2026–27	Segunda División	0	0	0	0	—		0	0
Career total			71	11	3	0	5	2	79	13
