= Rodrigo Dudok =

Uruguayan footballer (born 2007)

Personal information
- Full name: Rodrigo Dudok Rivero
- Date of birth: 23 July 2007 (age 19)
- Place of birth: Montevideo, Uruguay
- Height: 1.75 m (5 ft 9 in)
- Position: Left winger

Team information
- Current team: Estrela da Amadora (on loan from Racing Montevideo)
- Number: 11

Youth career
- Club Atlético Dryco
- 2021–2024: Defensor Sporting

Senior career*
Years	Team	Apps	(Gls)
2024–2025	Defensor Sporting	15	(0)
2026–	Racing Montevideo	11	(1)
2026–	→ Estrela da Amadora (loan)	0	(0)

International career^{‡}
2022–2023	Uruguay U17	15	(3)
2025	Uruguay U18	4	(0)
2024–	Uruguay U20	1	(0)
- * Club domestic league appearances and goals as of 3 September 2026 ‡ National team caps and goals as of 10 June 2025

Rodrigo Dudok Rivero (born 23 July 2007) is a Uruguayan professional footballer who plays as a left winger for Primeira Liga club Estrela da Amadora, on loan from Liga AUF Uruguaya club Racing Montevideo.

== Club career ==
Dudok joined the youth academy of Defensor Sporting in 2021. He was an unused substitute when Defensor Sporting won the 2023 Copa Uruguay, defeating Montevideo City Torque in the final on 22 May 2024. Two days later, on 24 May, he made his senior team debut for the club in a 3–1 league victory over Cerro Largo. On 31 October 2024, Dudok scored his first goal for Defensor Sporting in a 6–0 cup win against Ferro Carril. In December 2025, he left the club upon the expiry of his contract.

Dudok joined Racing Montevideo in January 2026. In August 2026, he attended a trial with Bundesliga club Bayern Munich. On 2 September 2026, he joined Primeira Liga club Estrela da Amadora on a season-long loan deal.

== International career ==
Dudok has represented Uruguay at various youth levels. He was part of the Uruguay under-17 squads that won friendly tournaments in Germany and Argentina. In March 2023, he was named in the squad for the 2023 South American U-17 Championship.

In January 2024, Dudok was named in the squad for the 2024 CONMEBOL Pre-Olympic Tournament by the Uruguay under-23 team head coach Marcelo Bielsa. However, he withdrew from the squad due to injury and was replaced by Agustín Albarracín. In June 2025, he was called up to the Uruguay under-18 team for the UEFA Friendship Cup.

== Career statistics ==
As of match played 10 August 2026

Appearances and goals by club, season and competition
Club	Season	League			Cup (Note: Includes Copa Uruguay, Taça de Portugal)		Continental		Total	
Club	Season	Division	Apps	Goals	Apps	Goals	Apps	Goals	Apps	Goals
Defensor Sporting	2023	Liga AUF Uruguaya	—		0	0	—		0	0
Defensor Sporting	2024	Liga AUF Uruguaya	6	0	1	1	0	0	7	1
Defensor Sporting	2025	Liga AUF Uruguaya	9	0	2	1	1 (Note: Appearance in Copa Libertadores)	0	12	1
Defensor Sporting	Total		15	0	3	2	1	0	19	2
Racing Montevideo	2026	Liga AUF Uruguaya	11	1	0	0	0	0	11	1
Estrela da Amadora (loan)	2026–27	Primeira Liga	0	0	0	0	—		0	0
Career total			26	1	3	2	1	0	30	3

== Honours ==
Defensor Sporting

- Copa Uruguay: 2023, 2024
