= Marco Palestra =

Italian footballer (born 2005)

Personal information
- Date of birth: 3 March 2005 (age 21)
- Place of birth: Buccinasco, Italy
- Height: 1.86 m (6 ft 1 in)
- Positions: Right-back; right wing-back

Team information
- Current team: Chelsea
- Number: 2

Youth career
- 2010–2014: GS Assago
- 2014–2015: Inter Milan
- 2014–2023: Atalanta

Senior career*
Years	Team	Apps	(Gls)
2023–2024	Atalanta U23	40	(3)
2023–2026	Atalanta	9	(0)
2025–2026	→ Cagliari (loan)	37	(1)
2026–	Chelsea	5	(0)

International career^{‡}
2023–2024	Italy U19	9	(1)
2024	Italy U20	2	(0)
2024–	Italy U21	8	(0)
2026–	Italy	3	(0)
- * Club domestic league appearances and goals as of 16:35, 8 November 2026 (UTC) ‡ National team caps and goals as of 21:56, 15 November 2026 (UTC)

Marco Palestra (born 3 March 2005) is an Italian professional footballer who plays as a right-back or right wing-back for Premier League club Chelsea and the Italy national team.

== Club career ==
Palestra began playing football with GS Assago where he stayed four years, had a year long stint with Inter Milan's academy before finally finishing his development with Atalanta's academy starting in 2014. Originally a central midfielder, at U17 level he was converted to a winger and then a right-back. He was promoted to the newly created Atalanta U23's in their debut season in the 2023–24 Serie C. He made his senior and professional debut with the senior Atalanta team as a substitute in a 4–0 UEFA Europa League win over Raków Częstochowa on 14 December 2023. He was loaned to fellow Serie A club Cagliari for the 2025–26 season. On 24 January 2026, he scored his first Serie A goal and provided an assist in a 2–1 away victory over Fiorentina.

Palestra signed a seven-year contract with Premier League club Chelsea on 1 July 2026, for an initial transfer fee worth approximately £43 million, with a further £5 million available in performance-related add-ons. On 10 October 2026, Palestra made his Premier League debut for Chelsea as a substitute in a 5-1 home victory against Bournemouth.

== International career ==
Palestra is a youth international for Italy. In September 2023, he was called up to the Italy U18s for a set of friendlies. In November 2023 he was called up to the Italy U19s for a set of 2024 UEFA European Under-19 Championship qualification matches.

In March 2026, he was called up to the senior Italy team for the first time for the 2026 FIFA World Cup qualification play-offs. He made his debut on 26 March in a 2–0 win over Northern Ireland in the play-off semi-finals. He also played in the play-off final against Bosnia, which Italy lost on penalties and resulted in them failing to qualify for a third successive World Cup.

== Career statistics ==
=== Club ===
As of match played 8 November 2026

Appearances and goals by club, season and competition
Club	Season	League			National cup (Note: Includes Coppa Italia, FA Cup)		League cup (Note: Includes EFL Cup)		Europe		Other		Total	
Club	Season	Division	Apps	Goals	Apps	Goals	Apps	Goals	Apps	Goals	Apps	Goals	Apps	Goals
Atalanta U23	2023–24	Serie C	40	3	1	0	—		—		—		41	3
Atalanta	2023–24	Serie A	0	0	0	0	—		1 (Note: Appearance in UEFA Europa League)	0	—		1	0
Atalanta	2024–25	Serie A	9	0	1	0	—		3 (Note: Appearances in UEFA Champions League)	0	2 (Note: One appearance in UEFA Super Cup, one appearance in Supercoppa Italiana)	0	15	0
Atalanta	Total		9	0	1	0	—		4	0	2	0	16	0
Cagliari (loan)	2025–26	Serie A	37	1	0	0	—		—		—		37	1
Chelsea	2026–27	Premier League	5	0	0	0	1	0	—		—		6	0
Career total			91	4	2	0	1	0	4	0	2	0	100	4

=== International ===
As of match played 15 November 2026

Appearances and goals by national team and year
National team	Year	Apps	Goals
Italy	2026	3	0
Total		3	0

== Honours ==
Atalanta

- UEFA Europa League: 2023–24

Individual

- Serie A Best Defender: 2025–26
- EA Sports FC Serie A Team of the Season: 2025–26
- Serie A Team of the Year: 2025–26
