= Mattia Felici =

Italian footballer (born 2001)

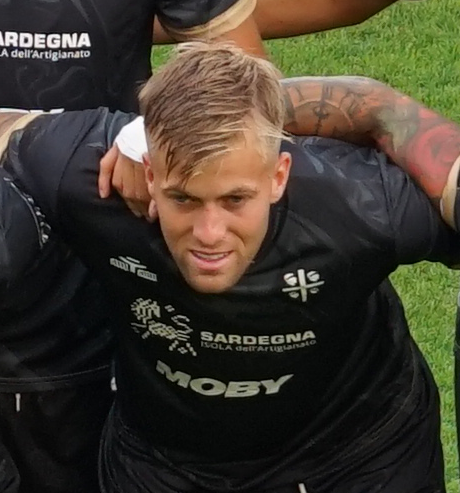
- Felici in 2024 with Cagliari

Personal information
- Date of birth: 17 April 2001 (age 25)
- Place of birth: Rome, Italy
- Height: 1.82 m (6 ft 0 in)
- Position: Left winger

Team information
- Current team: Cagliari
- Number: 17

Youth career
- GSD Nuova Tor Tre Teste
- 2018–2019: → Lecce (loan)

Senior career*
Years	Team	Apps	(Gls)
2018–2019	GSD Nuova Tor Tre Teste		
2018–2019	→ Lecce (loan)	1	(0)
2019–2022	Lecce	0	(0)
2019–2020	→ Palermo (loan)	25	(4)
2022	→ Palermo (loan)	11	(1)
2022–2024	Triestina	27	(4)
2023–2024	→ Feralpisalò (loan)	36	(4)
2024	Feralpisalò	0	(0)
2024–	Cagliari	32	(2)
- * Club domestic league appearances and goals as of 25 May 2026

Mattia Felici (born 17 April 2001) is an Italian professional footballer who plays as a left winger for Serie A club Cagliari.

== Club career ==
Born in Rome, Felici started his playing career at local amateur team GSD Nuova Tor Tre Teste, before joining Lecce's youth sector in 2018, initially on loan.

He made his professional debut for Lecce on 23 March 2019, as a 70th-minute substitute for Panagiotis Tachtsidis in a 7–0 Serie B win over Ascoli. He was signed permanently by Lecce by the end of the campaign, and subsequently loaned to Serie D club Palermo for the 2019–20 season. Here, the winger established himself as a regular starter, helping the team win promotion back to Serie C.

After returning to Lecce in July 2020, Felici failed to break into the first team during the 2020–21 Serie B campaign, as well as the first half of the following season, due to a series of injuries. On 5 January 2022, he was loaned back to Palermo, now in Serie C, on a two-year term, with an option to buy. However, at the end of the campaign, on 21 July 2022 Felici terminated both his loan spell and his contract with Lecce by mutual consent.

A couple days later, he was permanently signed by fellow Serie C side Triestina on a three-year deal. Although the team got involved in a relegation battle since the start of the 2022–23 season, Felici established himself as a regular starter and one of the club's most notable performers. However, on 30 November 2022, he was sent-off for violent conduct against referee Dario Madonia in a 2–0 league loss against Piacenza, and subsequently received a four-match ban. On 22 April 2023, he scored one of the goals in a 2–1 league win over Pergolettese, which allowed Triestina to reach the play-outs; the team would eventually defeat Sangiuliano City to stay in the third tier.

On 30 July 2023, Felici joined newly-promoted Serie B side Feralpisalò on a season-long loan, with an option-to-buy that could turn into an obligation, once certain targets were met. He scored four goals and five assists in 36 league games, as the team eventually got relegated to Serie C.

On 10 July 2024, Felici joined Serie A side Cagliari, signing a three-year contract, with a club option for two more seasons. The deal reportedly commanded a fee in the region of €2 million, as well as the loan of Nicolò Cavuoti to Feralpisalò.

== Style of play ==
Felici is primarily a left winger, although he can play in several different attacking positions, or even as a left wing-back.

== Career statistics ==
=== Club ===
As of match played 26 October 2025

Appearances and goals by club, season and competition
Club	Season	League			National Cup		Other		Total	
Club	Season	Division	Apps	Goals	Apps	Goals	Apps	Goals	Apps	Goals
Lecce	2018–19	Serie B	1	0	0	0	—		1	0
Lecce	2020–21	Serie B	0	0	0	0	0	0	0	0
Lecce	Total		1	0	0	0	0	0	1	0
Palermo (loan)	2019–20	Serie D	25	4	0	0	—		25	4
Palermo (loan)	2021–22	Serie C	11	1	0	0	0	0	11	1
Palermo (loan)	Total		36	5	0	0	0	0	36	5
Triestina	2022–23	Serie C	30	4	—		0	0	30	4
Feralpisalò (loan)	2023–24	Serie B	36	4	2	1	—		38	5
Cagliari	2024–25	Serie A	20	0	2	0	—		22	0
Cagliari	2025–26	Serie A	6	2	1	1	—		7	3
Cagliari	Total		26	2	3	1	0	0	29	3
Career total			129	15	5	2	0	0	134	17

== Honours ==
Lecce

- Serie B runners-up: 2018–19
