= Adam Obert =

Slovak footballer (born 2002)

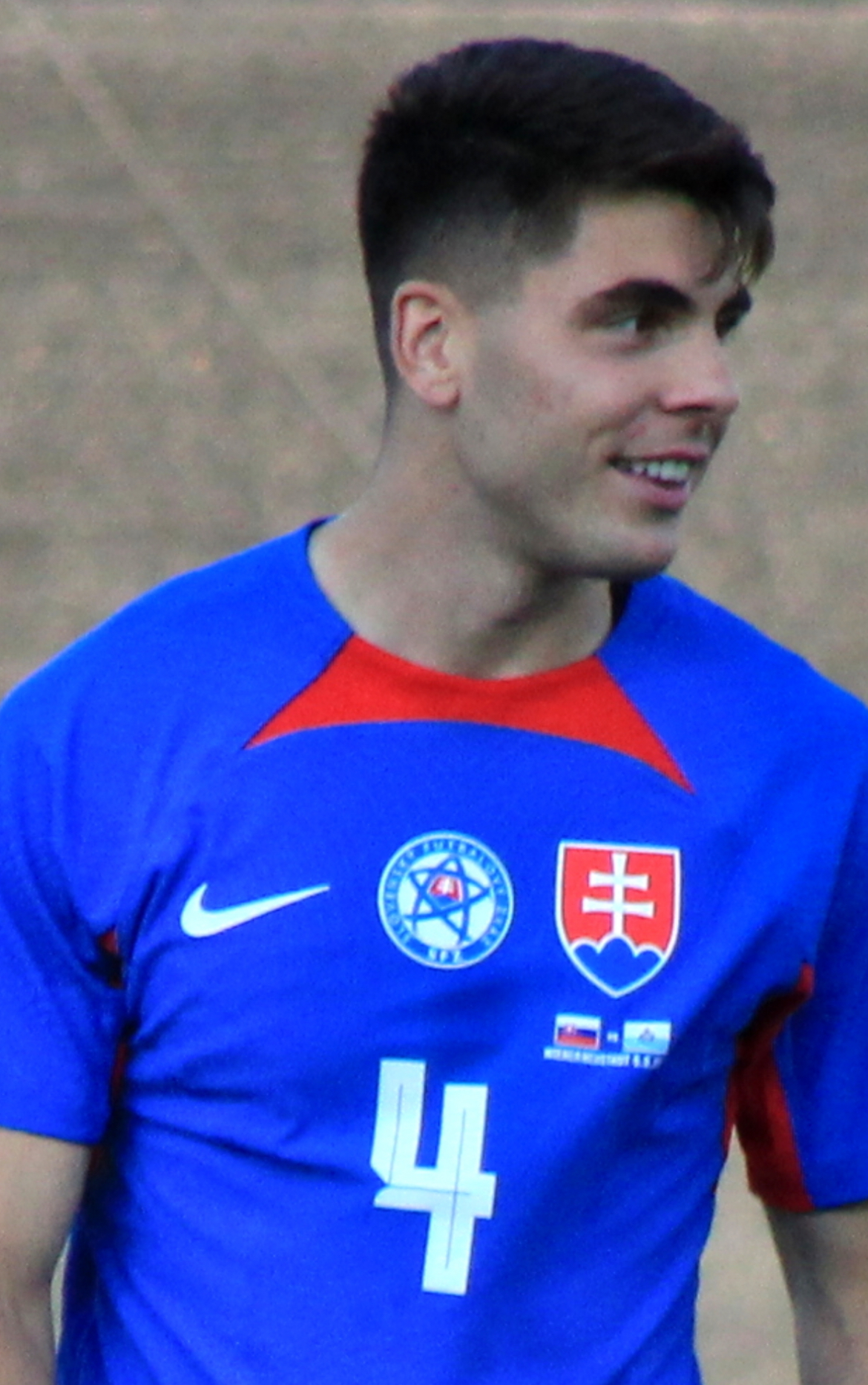
- Obert with Slovakia in 2024

Personal information
- Date of birth: 23 August 2002 (age 24)
- Place of birth: Bratislava, Slovakia
- Height: 1.86 m (6 ft 1 in)
- Position: Centre-back

Team information
- Current team: Cagliari
- Number: 33

Youth career
- 2010–2018: Zbrojovka Brno
- 2018–2021: Sampdoria

Senior career*
Years	Team	Apps	(Gls)
2021–	Cagliari	117	(1)

International career^{‡}
2018	Slovakia U16	2	(0)
2018–2019	Slovakia U17	5	(0)
2019	Slovakia U18	1	(0)
2019	Slovakia U19	5	(0)
2021–	Slovakia U21	13	(0)
2022–	Slovakia	24	(1)
- * Club domestic league appearances and goals as of 19 September 2026 ‡ National team caps and goals as of 6 October 2026

Adam Obert (born 23 August 2002) is a Slovak professional footballer who plays as a centre-back for Serie A club Cagliari and the Slovakia national team.

== Club career ==
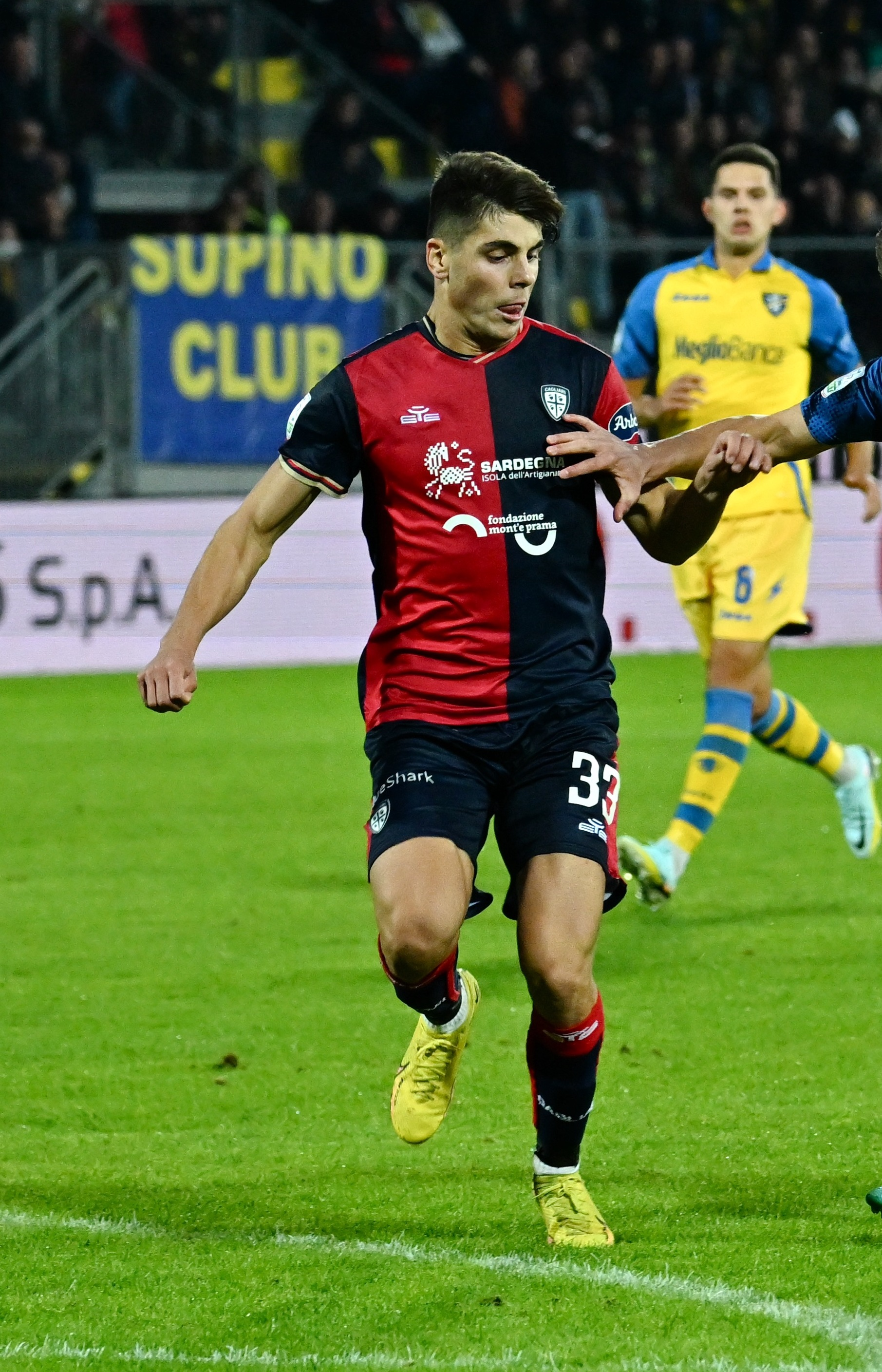
Obert playing for Cagliari in 2022

=== Youth clubs ===
Obert is a product of the youth academies of Zbrojovka Brno and Sampdoria. In March 2022, he commented on his switch from Genoa to Cagliari, critically highlighting the philosophy of integration of youth players at Sampdoria, stating he did not wish to get lost in Serie C and instead sought challenges with top division senior football. He joined the academy of Cagliari in the summer of 2021.

=== Cagliari ===
On 24 October 2021, Obert made his professional debut for Cagliari as a late substitute in a 3–0 defeat to Fiorentina in Serie A. While training with the first team, he sought advice from veteran and fellow centre-back Diego Godín, of whom he spoke highly and expressed regret at his departure from the Sardinia-based club.

By February 2022, Cagliari had offered Obert a four-and-a-half-year contract extension through to summer 2026 with a one-year option to extend.

== International career ==
=== Youth teams ===
Obert was first recognised in a senior national team nomination on 16 March 2022 by Štefan Tarkovič as an alternate ahead of two international friendly fixtures against Norway and Finland. During the March international fixtures, Obert ended up representing the Slovak U21 side under Jaroslav Kentoš in 2023 Under-21 European Championship qualifiers against Northern Ireland and Spain.

=== Senior ===
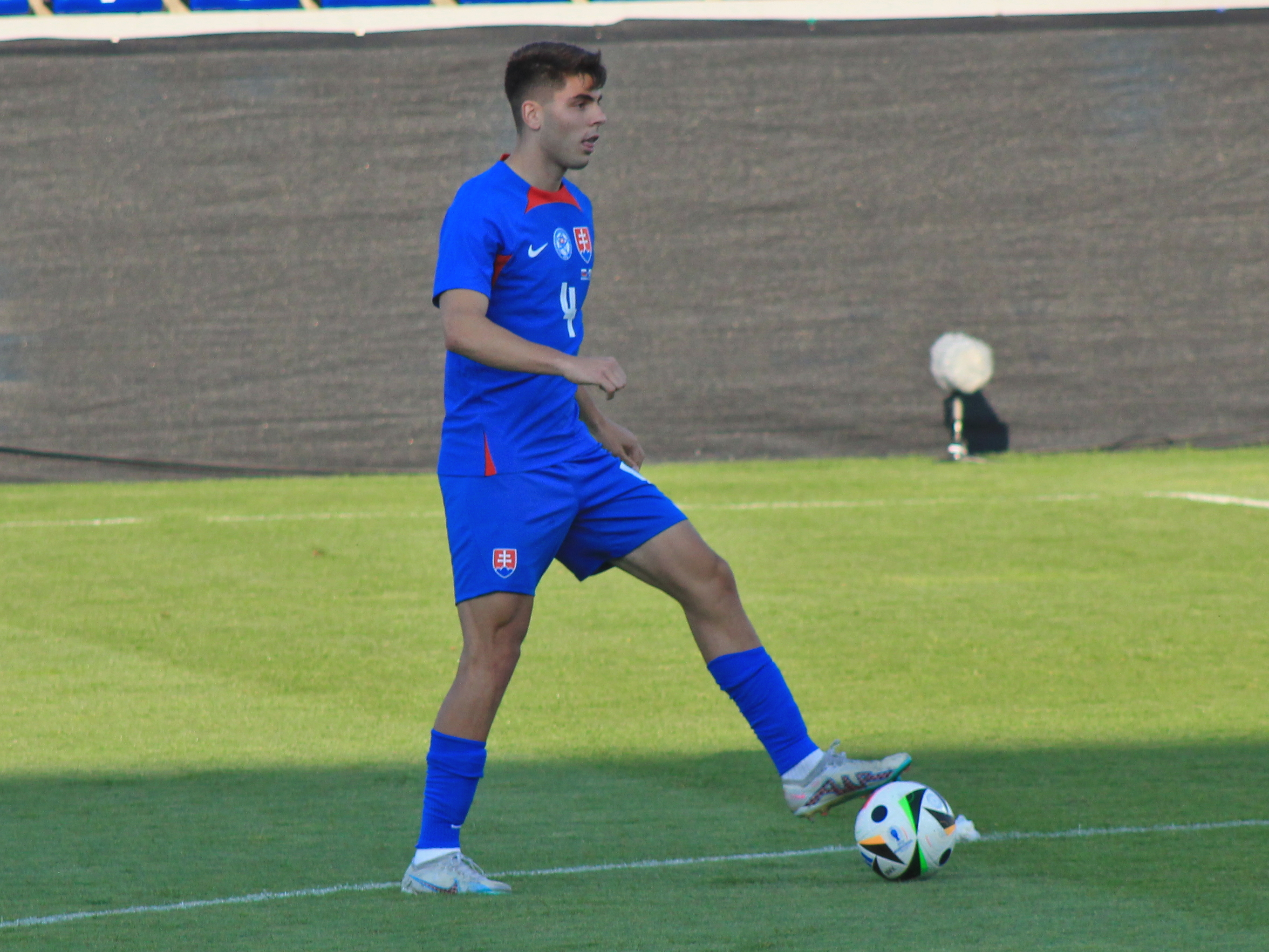
Obert with Slovakia in 2024 against San Marino

In November 2022, Obert received his first call-up by coach Francesco Calzona to the Slovak senior team for two friendly matches against Montenegro and Marek Hamšík's farewell one against Chile.

On 17 November, in the former away match, he was only listed as a substitute and remained benched for the entirety of the 2–2 draw. On 20 November, Obert debuted in a home match against the latter opponent in Tehelné pole against Chile, replacing Vernon De Marco at the 80th minute. As a result, he became the last international to debut under the captainship of Marek Hamšík, who was taken off the pitch less than ten minutes later in his final international walk off the pitch. Obert's debut match ended in a goalless draw.

In March 2023, Obert received his first competitive call-up for two home UEFA Euro 2024 qualifications against Luxembourg and Bosnia and Herzegovina, marking Obert's first competitive national team call-up. He was later included in Slovakia's squad for UEFA Euro 2024 and played a total of 24 minutes as a substitute, appearing in the 1–0 victory against Belgium and 2–1 loss against Ukraine.

Obert scored his first international goal for Slovakia on 13 October 2025, during a 2026 FIFA World Cup qualification match against Luxembourg.

== Personal life ==
His grandfather, Jozef, was a former footballer of Czechoslovakia and Slovan Bratislava. During Adam's tenure in Sampdoria and Cagliari, he became fluent in Italian.

== Career statistics ==
=== Club ===
As of match played 19 September 2026

Appearances and goals by club, season and competition
Club	Season	League			National cup		Europe		Total	
Club	Season	Division	Apps	Goals	Apps	Goals	Apps	Goals	Apps	Goals
Cagliari	2021–22	Serie A	6	0	2	0	—		8	0
Cagliari	2022–23	Serie B	33	0	2	0	—		35	0
Cagliari	2023–24	Serie A	17	0	3	0	—		20	0
Cagliari	2024–25	Serie A	21	1	2	0	—		23	1
Cagliari	2025–26	Serie A	35	0	2	0	—		37	0
Cagliari	2026–27	Serie A	5	0	2	0	—		7	0
Cagliari	Total		117	1	13	0	0	0	130	1
Career total			117	1	13	0	0	0	130	1

=== International ===
As of match played 6 October 2026

Appearances and goals by national team and year
National team	Year	Apps	Goals
Slovakia	2022	1	0
Slovakia	2024	10	0
Slovakia	2025	6	1
Slovakia	2026	7	0
Total		24	1

Scores and results list Slovakia's goal tally first, score column indicates score after each Obert goal.

List of international goals scored by Adam Obert
No.	Date	Venue	Cap	Opponent	Score	Result	Competition
1	13 October 2025	Anton Malatinský Stadium, Trnava, Slovakia	14	Luxembourg	1–0	2–0	2026 FIFA World Cup qualification
