= Riyad Idrissi =

Italian footballer

Personal information
- Date of birth: 13 June 2005 (age 21)
- Place of birth: Sadali, Italy
- Height: 1.82 m (6 ft 0 in)
- Position: Left-back

Team information
- Current team: Cagliari
- Number: 3

Youth career
- Polisportiva Isili
- 2018–2024: Cagliari

Senior career*
| Years | Team | Apps | (Gls) |
| 2024– | Cagliari | 23 | (2) |
| 2024–2025 | → Modena (loan) | 28 | (1) |

International career^{‡}
| 2024 | Italy U19 | 2 | (0) |
| 2024–2025 | Italy U20 | 7 | (0) |
| 2025– | Italy U21 | 2 | (0) |
- * Club domestic league appearances and goals as of 25 May 2026 ‡ National team caps and goals as of 16:29, 12 September 2025 (UTC)

Riyad Idrissi (born 13 June 2005) is an Italian professional footballer who plays as a left-back for Serie A club Cagliari.

== Club career ==
Idrissi began playing football with the academy of Polisportiva Isili, before joining Cagliari's academy in 2018 at the age of 13, where he finished his development. On 3 July 2024, he extended his contract with Cagliari until 2027, and then joined Modena on a season-long loan in the Serie B. Returning to Cagliari for the 2025–26 season, he debuted with them in a 1–1 (6–5) Coppa Italia penalty shootout win over Virtus Entella on 16 August 2025.

== International career ==
Born in Italy, Idrissi is of Moroccan descent. He was called up to the Italy U21s for a set of 2027 UEFA European Under-21 Championship qualification matches in September 2025.

== Career statistics ==
=== Club ===
As of match played 31 January 2026

Appearances and goals by club, season and competition
| Club | Season | League | | | Cup | | Europe | | Other | | Total | |
| Club | Season | Division | Apps | Goals | Apps | Goals | Apps | Goals | Apps | Goals | Apps | Goals |
|---|---|---|---|---|---|---|---|---|---|---|---|---|
| Modena (loan) | 2024–25 | Serie B | 28 | 1 | 1 | 0 | — | | — | | 29 | 1 |
| Cagliari | 2025–26 | Serie A | 18 | 2 | 3 | 0 | — | | — | | 21 | 2 |
| Career total | | | 46 | 3 | 4 | 0 | 0 | 0 | 0 | 0 | 50 | 3 |
