= Gennaro Borrelli =

Italian footballer

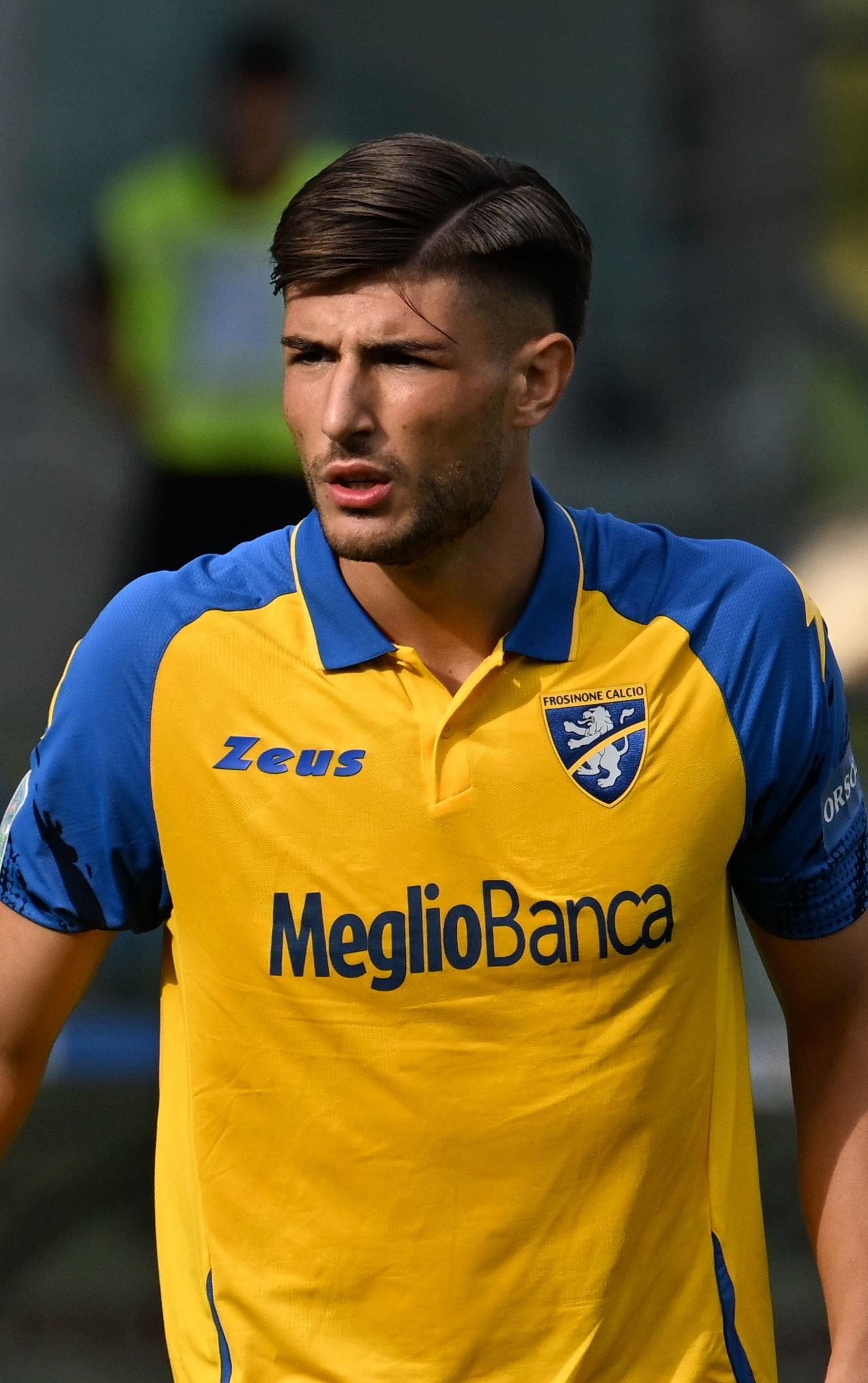
- Borrelli in 2022

Personal information
- Date of birth: 10 March 2000 (age 26)
- Place of birth: Campobasso, Italy
- Height: 1.94 m (6 ft 4 in)
- Position: Forward

Team information
- Current team: Çaykur Rizespor (on loan from Cagliari)
- Number: 29

Youth career
- –2019: Pescara

Senior career*
Years	Team	Apps	(Gls)
2019–2023	Pescara	20	(1)
2020–2021	→ Cosenza (loan)	2	(0)
2021	→ Juve Stabia (loan)	17	(4)
2021–2022	→ Monopoli (loan)	16	(8)
2022–2023	→ Frosinone (loan)	24	(6)
2023–2024	Frosinone	1	(0)
2023–2024	→ Brescia (loan)	28	(9)
2024–2025	Brescia	34	(6)
2025–	Cagliari	29	(5)
2026–	→ Çaykur Rizespor (loan)	0	(0)

International career^{‡}
2019	Italy U20	1	(1)
- * Club domestic league appearances and goals as of 20 September 2026 ‡ National team caps and goals as of 18 November 2019

Gennaro Borrelli (born 10 March 2000) is an Italian footballer who plays as a forward for Süper Lig club Çaykur Rizespor, on loan from Serie A club Cagliari.

== Club career ==
He was raised in Pescara's youth teams and made his first appearance for their Under-19 squad in the 2016–17 season. Late in the 2018–19 season, he received 3 call-ups to the senior squad, but remained on the bench.

He made his professional Serie B debut for Pescara on 27 September 2019 in a game against Crotone. He substituted Andrea Cisco in the 78th minute.

On 5 October 2020 he joined Cosenza on loan.

On 20 January 2021 he moved on a new loan to Serie C club Juve Stabia.

On 11 August 2021, he joined Monopoli on loan.

On 29 July 2022, Borrelli joined Frosinone on loan with a conditional redemption obligation.

After the obligation was triggered and Borrelli moved to Frosinone on a permanent basis, he made his Serie A debut on 19 August 2023 against Napoli.

On 1 September 2023, Borrelli was loaned by Brescia. On 12 June 2024, Brescia exercised their option to make the transfer permanent.

On 10 July 2025, Borelli signed a contract with Cagliari for four seasons, with a club option to extend for the fifth season. On 4 September 2026, Borelli was loaned to Çaykur Rizespor in Turkey, with an option to buy.

== Career statistics ==
=== Club ===
As of match played 24 May 2026

Appearances and goals by club, season and competition
Club	Season	League			Cup		Europe		Other		Total	
Club	Season	Division	Apps	Goals	Apps	Goals	Apps	Goals	Apps	Goals	Apps	Goals
Pescara	2019–20	Serie B	20	1	2	0	—		1	0	22	1
Cosenza	2020–21	Serie B	2	0	1	0	—		—		3	0
Juve Stabia	2020–21	Serie C	17	4	0	0	—		2	0	19	4
Monopoli	2021–22	Serie C	16	8	0	0	—		5	1	21	9
Frosinone	2022–23	Serie B	23	6	0	0	—		—		23	6
Frosinone	2023–24	Serie A	1	0	1	0	—		—		2	0
Frosinone	Total		24	6	1	0	0	0	0	0	25	6
Brescia	2023–24	Serie B	28	9	0	0	—		—		28	9
Brescia	2024–25	Serie B	34	6	2	1	—		—		36	7
Brescia	Total		62	15	2	1	0	0	0	0	64	16
Cagliari	2025–26	Serie A	27	5	2	1	—		—		29	6
Career total			168	39	8	2	0	0	8	1	184	42
