= CA Auto Bank =

Automotive-oriented bank of Italy, joint venture of Stellantis and Crédit Agricole

CA Auto Bank S.p.A.
- Type: Subsidiary
- Industry: Banking
- Founded: January 16, 2015; 11 years ago
- Headquarters: Corso G. Agnelli, 200 Turin, Italy
- Key people: Giacomo Carelli (CEO & General Manager); Stéphane Priami (Chairman)
- Products: car finance
- Operating income: € 534 million (2017)
- Number of employees: 2,092 (2017)
- Parent: Crédit Agricole Consumer Finance
- Website: www.ca-autobank.com

CA Auto Bank S.p.A., formerly FCA Bank S.p.A., is an Italian financial institution that focuses on car financing, formerly structured as joint venture between FCA Italy and Crédit Agricole Consumer Finance. In 2023, FCA Bank S.p.A. became CA Auto Bank S.p.A. after its acquisition by Crédit Agricole from Stellantis Italy.

The bank is dedicated to motorists, and mainly operates in the automotive financing sector and cooperates with the automotive brands Alfa Romeo, Chrysler, Fiat, Jeep, Abarth, Maserati, Aston Martin, Jaguar, Lotus and Land Rover, as well as motorhome and caravan manufacturer Hymer.

== History ==
=== 1925–1938 ===
Former logo of FCA Bank.

On April 25, 1925, SAVA (acronym of Società Anonima Vendita Automobili) was established in Turin, Italy when the 509 model was put on the market. The "509" was the first FIAT model sold on credit. The finance house however also offered financing for the purchases of cars produced by other brands. 1927: S.A.V.A. starts the savings collection with interest-bearing bonds. In the same year, in order to raise the awareness of the newly established company and extend to clients the opportunity of owning a car, two Italian artists of the time Codognato and Romano, conceived S.A.V.A.'s first advertisement.

On March 15, 1930, the board of directors of SAVA approved a share capital increase of 4,000,000 Lire and afterwards, on April 11 of that same year, FIAT purchased the entire shareholding. As sole shareholder, it decided that the disbursement of loans should be restricted to FIAT products only, starting from January 1, 1931. In 1938, in order to dispose of the big number of used cars, SAVA started to finance, through hire purchase solutions specific for the second-hand cars.

=== 2003–2006 ===
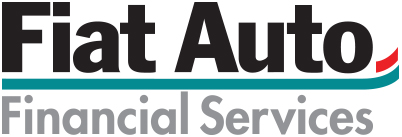

In 2003 SAVA was placed under Fidis Retail Italia, 51% of which was sold to Banca Intesa, Sanpaolo IMI, Capitalia and Unicredit, while 49% remained with Fiat Auto. December 2006: Fiat Auto S.p.A. and Crédit Agricole S.A. create a joint venture with the aim of implementing FGA's financial activities across Europe. December 28, 2006 (closing date):

- the repurchase by Fiat Auto S.p.A. of a 51% holding in Fidis Retail Italia.;
- the merger in Fidis Retail Italia S.p.A. of the fully controlled FiatSava S.p.A.;
- the inclusion of Fidis Retail Italia S.p.A. in the special list ex art 107 of legislative decree 385/1993 TU.;
- the change in business name from Fidis Retail Italia S.p.A. to Fiat Auto Financial Services S.p.A.;
- the subscription by Fiat Auto S.p.A. of the capital increase needed to provide the joint venture with financial resources required by current regulations regarding the supervision of the assets of financial intermediaries;
- the entry of Sofinco S.A. (Crédit Agricole Group) in the shareholding structure with a 50% holding.

=== 2007–2008 ===
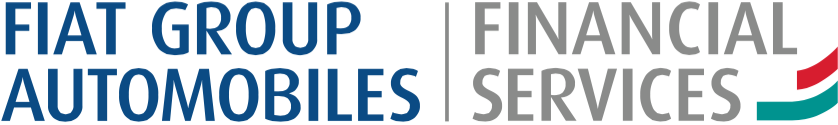

On March 1, 2007, Fiat Group Automobiles S.p.A. (new business name of Fiat Auto S.p.A.) reunifies in Fidis Retail Italia S.p.A. all its European holdings in the sales networks and rental financing divisions. On April 5, 2007, following the change in business name from Fiat Auto to Fiat Group Automobiles S.p.A., Fiat Auto Financial Services S.p.A. becomes Fiat Group Automobiles Financial Services S.p.A. July 2008: Fiat Group Automobiles Financial Services S.p.A. signs an important collaboration agreement with Jaguar Land Rover in the European car financing area.

=== 2009–2013 ===
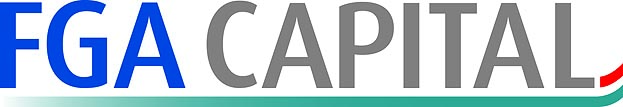

On January 1, 2009, Fiat Group Automobiles Financial Services changes its name to FGA Capital FGA Capital replaces Daimler Financial Services in the financial services management for all Chrysler brands (Chrysler, Jeep and Dodge). September 2013: FGA Capital signs a collaboration agreement with Maserati. Maserati Financial Services is born. October 2013: the partnership between FGA Capital, Jaguar Land Rover is renewed for four years, starting from January 1, 2014, with the option of extending the provision of finance services to support Jaguar Land Rover until the end of 2021. November 2013: the joint venture between Fiat Group Automobiles, Crédit Agricole e Crédit Agricole Consumer Finance is renewed up to December 31, 2021.

=== 2015–2019 ===

FCA Bank SpA was born on January 16, 2015; this new company is equally made by FCA Italy S.p.A. and Crédit Agricole Consumer Finance. After obtaining the banking license in Italy, FCA Bank becomes the leader of an international banking group present in 17 European countries, adding also Morocco. From July 2015 FCA Bank, along with the Erwin Hymer Group, announce the creation of Erwin Hymer Group Finance.

On July 19, Moody's ranks FCA Bank A3, the highest level among the Italian banking system, attesting its financial health. At a later time, in August, FCA Bank signs a joint venture agreement with Ferrari Financial Services AG, the company that offers financial solutions for private and business clients. During October, FCA Bank expands further its offer, launching Conto Deposito, the company's first online savings account.

Starting from 2017, the Leasys company, wholly owned by FCA Bank, began a path of internationalization by expanding into the markets in which FCA Bank is present: United Kingdom, Germany, France, Belgium, the Netherlands and Spain.

At the beginning of 2018, FCA Bank renewed its partnership with Jaguar Land Rover in continental Europe until the end of 2022. In the same year, the company was also chosen as a financial partner by two other historic luxury automotive brands: Aston Martin and Morgan Motor Company.

Leasys, a subsidiary of FCA Bank, in 2018 acquired Winrent, a short-term rental company and at the same time continued its internationalization path.

From 2019 FCA Bank enters the two-wheeler business, thanks to a partnership with the Harley Davidson brand where it will offer financial services in Spain and Poland.

In April 2019, FCA Bank was sanctioned by the Bank of Italy for an amount of €2.5 million, due to "shortcomings in the organization and controls on transparency".

=== 2020s ===
FCA Bank signed a Cooperation and Service Agreement for the provision of financial services in Europe with VinFast Europe.

== Branches ==
FCA Bank has presence in many Europe countries and in Morocco. In Italy FCA Bank headquarters are in Turin and it also has operations in Rome.

== Structure ==
=== Shareholding ===
FCA Bank is a joint venture between FCA Italy and Crédit Agricole Consumer Finance. The first is fully owned by Stellantis, while the second is a subsidiary of Crédit Agricole S.A.. FCA Bank, in turn, controls the following companies which can be divided into: Banking Group and Non Banking Group.

=== Corporate ===
Banking Group (share holding):

- FCA Bank S.p.A. (Irish Branch)
- FCA Bank S.p.A. (Belgian Branch)
- FCA Automotive Services UK Ltd (100%)
- Ferrari Financial Services GmbH (50%)
- FCA Dealer Services UK Ltd (100%)
- FCA Capital Nederland BV (100%)
- FCA Bank S.p.A. (Polish Branch) since 2020-01-01 fcabank.pl
- FCA Bank GmbH (50%)
- FCA Capital Espana EFC SA (100%)
- FCA Capital Portugal IFIC SA (100%)
- FCA Bank Deutschland GmbH (100%)
- FCA Capital France SA (100%) which, in turn, controls FCA Leasing France SNC (99,99%)
- FCA Capital Suisse SA (100%)
- FCA Capital Hellas SA (99,99%) which, in turn, controls FCA Insurance Hellas SA (99,99%)
- FCA Leasing GmbH (100%)
- FCA Dealer Services Espana SA (100%)
- FCA Leasing Polska sp.zp.o (100%)
- FCA Capital Danmark A/S (100%) which, in turn, controls FCA Capital Sverige AB (100%) and FCA Capital Norge AS (100%)

Non Banking Group (share holding):

- Leasys S.p.A. (100%)
- FCA Dealer Services Portugal SA (100%)
- FCA Capital RE DAC (100%)

== See also ==
- Crédit Agricole Consumer Finance
- FCA
- Alfa Romeo
- Fiat
- Abarth
- Fiat Professional
- Lancia
- Maserati
- Land Rover
- Mirafiori corporate building

== Gallery ==
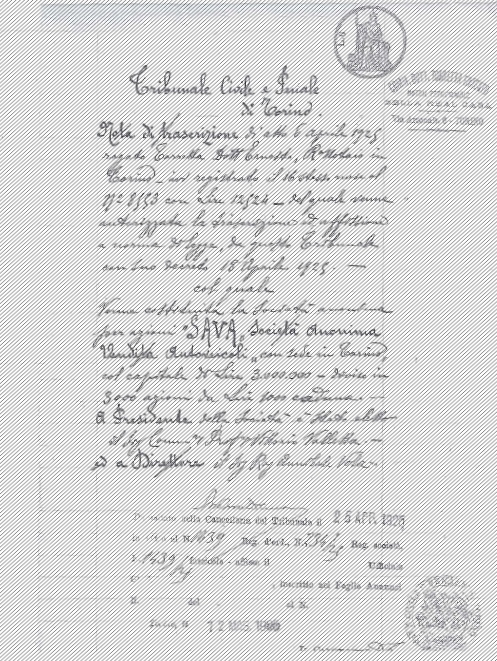

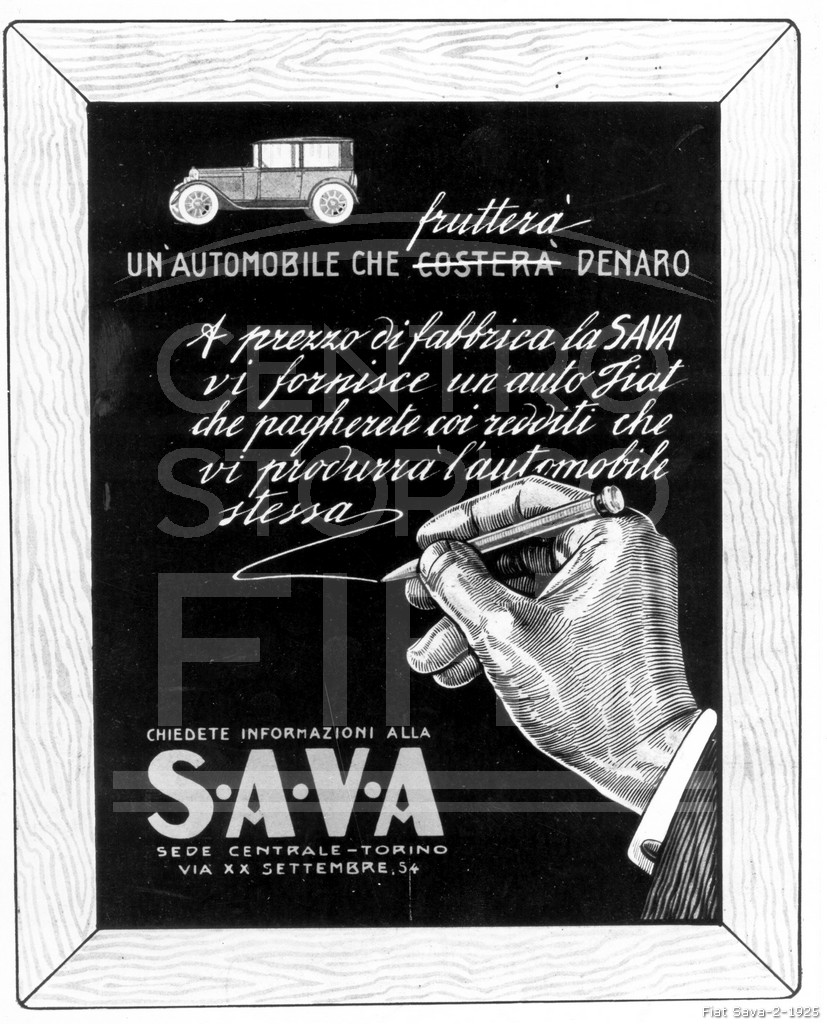

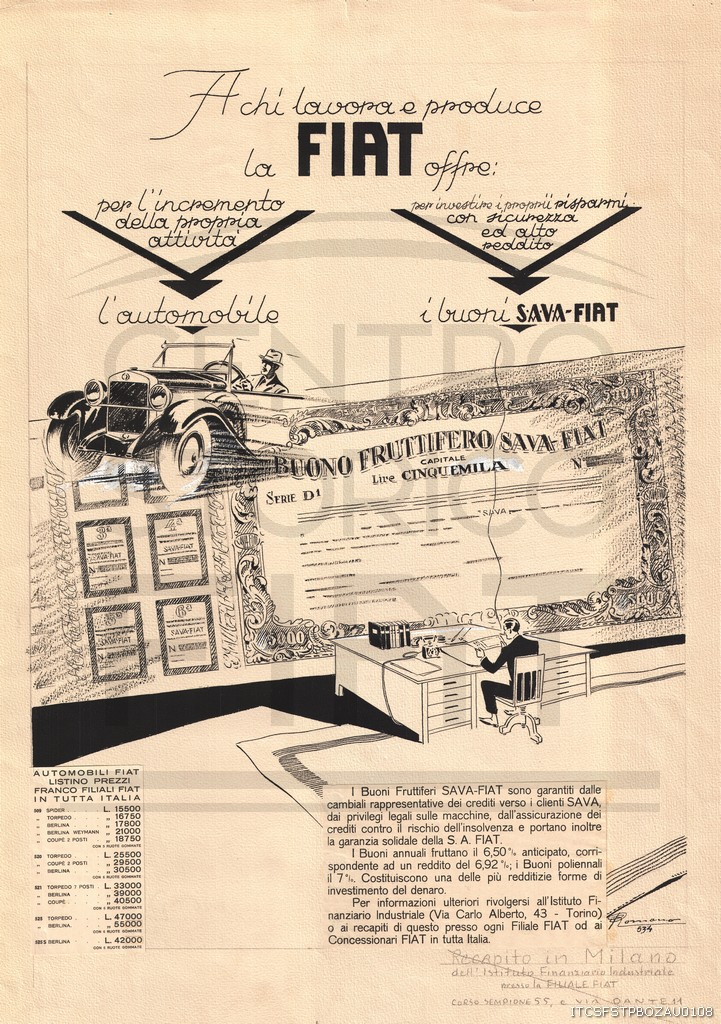

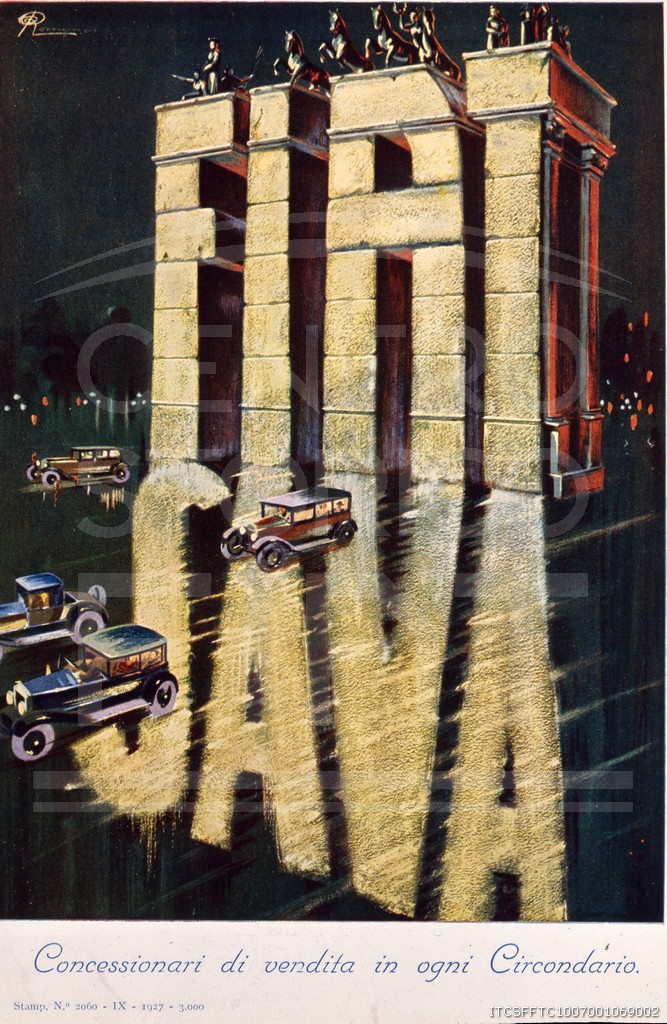

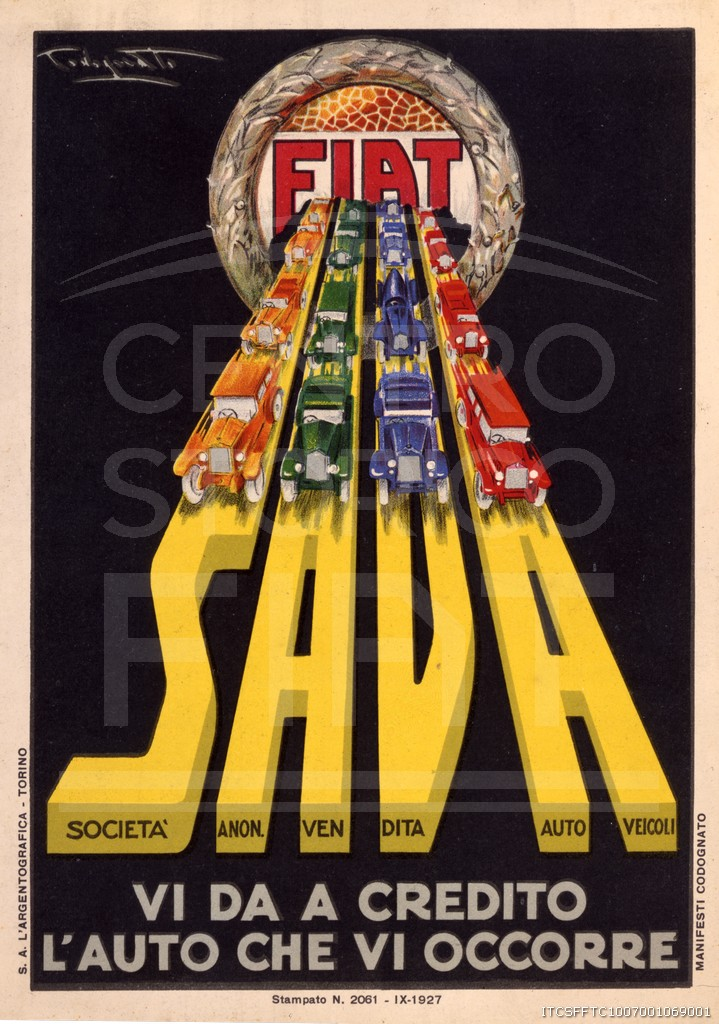
