= Matteo Prati =

Italian footballer (born 2003)

Personal information
- Full name: Matteo Prati
- Date of birth: 28 December 2003 (age 22)
- Place of birth: Ravenna, Italy
- Height: 1.85 m (6 ft 1 in)
- Position: Midfielder

Team information
- Current team: Racing de Santander (on loan from Cagliari)
- Number: 18

Youth career
- 2011–2018: Cesena
- 2018–2021: Ravenna

Senior career*
Years	Team	Apps	(Gls)
2021–2022	Ravenna	35	(5)
2022–2023	SPAL	20	(2)
2023–	Cagliari	58	(2)
2026	→ Torino (loan)	13	(0)
2026–	→ Racing de Santander (loan)	0	(0)

International career^{‡}
2023	Italy U20	9	(1)
2023–2025	Italy U21	15	(1)
Medal record
Men's football
Representing Italy
FIFA U-20 World Cup
Runner-up	2023 Argentina
- * Club domestic league appearances and goals as of 25 May 2026 ‡ National team caps and goals as of 22 June 2025

Matteo Prati (born 28 December 2003) is an Italian professional footballer who plays as a midfielder for La Liga club Racing de Santander, on loan from Serie A club Cagliari.

== Club career ==
Prati made his senior professional debut for the club he was raised in, Ravenna in Serie C in March 2021. Following Ravenna's relegation to Serie D for the 2021–22 season, he became a regular member of the starting lineup.

On 27 July 2022, Prati signed a three-year contract (with an option to extend for one more year) with SPAL in Serie B. He made his Serie B debut for SPAL on 3 September 2022 in a game against Bari. He made a good impact, but the team was relegated at the end of the season.

On 17 August 2023, Prati officially joined Serie A club Cagliari for five million euros (plus two millions in add-ons), signing a five-year contract with the club. In the process, the deal broke the transfer record as the most lucrative sale from any Serie C team. He made his Serie A debut on 17 September 2023, playing as a starter in the match against Udinese.

On 30 January 2026, Prati moved to Torino on loan with an option to buy. On 26 August, he joined Spanish newly La Liga promoted side Racing de Santander also in a temporary deal.

== International career ==
In May 2023, Prati was included in the Italian U20 squad that took part in the FIFA U-20 World Cup in Argentina, where the Azzurrini finished runners-up after losing to Uruguay in the final match.

On 8 September 2023 he made his debut with the Italy U21, in the qualifying match against Latvia.

== Career statistics ==
=== Club ===
As of match played 27 December 2025

Appearances and goals by club, season and competition
Club	Season	League			National cup		Europe		Total	
Club	Season	Division	Apps	Goals	Apps	Goals	Apps	Goals	Apps	Goals
Ravenna	2020–21	Serie C	1	0	—		—		1	0
Ravenna	2021–22	Serie D	34	5	3	0	—		37	5
Ravenna	Total		35	5	3	0	0	0	38	5
SPAL	2022–23	Serie B	20	2	0	0	—		20	2
Cagliari	2023–24	Serie A	26	1	0	0	—		26	1
Cagliari	2024–25	Serie A	12	0	2	1	—		14	1
Cagliari	2025–26	Serie A	16	1	2	0	—		18	1
Cagliari	Total		54	2	4	1	0	0	58	3
Career total			109	9	7	1	0	0	116	10

== Honours ==
Italy U20

- FIFA U-20 World Cup runner-up: 2023
