= Davide Castelli =

Italian footballer (born 1999)

Personal information
- Date of birth: 30 August 1999 (age 27)
- Place of birth: Clusone, Italy
- Height: 1.85 m (6 ft 1 in)
- Position: Forward

Team information
- Current team: Casertana

Youth career
- 2007–2017: AlbinoLeffe
- 2017–2018: Villarreal

Senior career*
Years	Team	Apps	(Gls)
2016–2017	AlbinoLeffe	1	(0)
2018–2020	Villarreal C	38	(6)
2020–2021	Genoa	0	(0)
2020–2021	→ Pro Patria (loan)	23	(2)
2021–2024	Pro Patria	89	(23)
2024–2026	Virtus Entella	35	(6)
2025–2026	→ Cittadella (loan)	29	(5)
2026–	Casertana	0	(0)
- * Club domestic league appearances and goals as of 29 April 2026

Davide Castelli (born 30 August 1999) is an Italian footballer who plays as a forward for Serie C Group C club Casertana.

In 2019, Castelli made the longlist for the Golden Boy award.

== Club career ==
On 5 October 2020 he joined Serie C club Pro Patria on loan from Genoa, whom he had just joined. On 19 July 2021 he joined to Pro Patria permanently.

On 18 July 2024, Castelli signed with Virtus Entella.

== Club statistics ==
=== Club ===
As of 6 October 2020.

Club	Season	League			Cup		Other		Total	
Club	Season	Division	Apps	Goals	Apps	Goals	Apps	Goals	Apps	Goals
AlbinoLeffe	2016–17	Lega Pro	1	0	0	0	0	0	1	0
Villarreal C	2018–19	Tercera División	23	5	–		0	0	23	5
Villarreal C	2019–20	Tercera División	15	1	–		0	0	15	1
Villarreal C	Total		38	6	0	0	0	0	38	6
Genoa	2020–21	Serie A	0	0	0	0	0	0	0	0
Pro Patria (loan)	2020–21	Serie C	0	0	0	0	0	0	0	0
Career total			39	6	0	0	0	0	39	6
