= Nicolò Cavuoti =

Italian footballer (born 2003)

Personal information
- Date of birth: 4 April 2003 (age 23)
- Place of birth: Vasto, Italy
- Height: 1.77 m (5 ft 10 in)
- Position: Midfielder

Team information
- Current team: Catania (on loan from Cagliari)

Youth career
- 2007–2019: Virtus Vasto

Senior career*
Years	Team	Apps	(Gls)
2019–2020	Vastese	18	(0)
2020–	Cagliari	4	(0)
2023–2024	→ Olbia (loan)	21	(1)
2024–2025	→ Feralpisalò (loan)	36	(3)
2026-2026	→ Bari (loan)	7	(0)
2026	→ Catania (loan)	0	(0)

International career^{‡}
2021	Italy U18	1	(0)
2021–2022	Italy U19	4	(0)
2022	Italy U20	1	(0)
- * Club domestic league appearances and goals as of 30 August 2026 ‡ National team caps and goals as of 7 June 2022

Nicolò Cavuoti (born 4 April 2003) is an Italian professional footballer who plays as a winger for Serie C Group C club Catania, on loan from Cagliari.

== Career ==
A youth product of Virtus Vasto since 2012, Cavuoti moved to Vastese in 2019. He began his senior career with Vastese in the Serie D in 2019, before joining the U17s of Cagliari in 2020, and getting promoted to their reserves. He made his professional debut with Cagliari in a 1–0 Coppa Italia loss to Sassuolo on 19 January 2022, coming on as a late substitute in the 87th minute.

On 17 July 2023, Cavuoti joined Serie C club Olbia on a season-long loan. He played 22 matches in all competitions for the club, scoring one goal and one assist.

On 10 July 2024, Cavuoti joined Serie C club Feralpisalò on a season-long loan, as part of the deal that saw Mattia Felici join Cagliari.

After his return from the Feralpisalò loan, Cavuoti made his Serie A debut for Cagliari on 5 October 2025 against Udinese.

On 28 January 2026, Cavuoti was loaned by Bari in Serie B.

== International career ==
Cavuoti is a youth international for Italy, having represented the Italy U18s and U19s.
