= Nicola Pintus =

Italian footballer

Personal information
- Date of birth: 25 May 2005 (age 21)
- Place of birth: Cagliari, Italy
- Height: 1.89 m (6 ft 2 in)
- Position: Centre-back

Team information
- Current team: Pianese (on loan from Cagliari)
- Number: 23

Youth career
- 2010–2025: Cagliari

Senior career*
Years	Team	Apps	(Gls)
2025–	Cagliari	1	(0)
2026	→ Cosenza (loan)	2	(0)
2026–	→ Pianese (loan)	1	(0)
- * Club domestic league appearances and goals as of 23 August 2026

Nicola Pintus (born 25 May 2005) is an Italian professional footballer who plays as a centre-back for Serie C Group B club Pianese, on loan from Cagliari.

== Club career ==
Pintus joined the youth academy of Cagliari at the age of 5 and worked his way up their youth categories. On 22 June 2023, he signed his first contract with Cagliari until 2027. He made his senior debut with Cagliari in a 3–0 Serie A win over Venezia FC on 18 May 2025. On 9 September 2025, he extended his professional contract with Cagliari until 2029.
