= Joseph Liteta =

Zambian footballer

Personal information
- Date of birth: 22 February 2006 (age 20)
- Place of birth: Lusaka, Zambia
- Height: 1.75 m (5 ft 9 in)
- Position: Central midfielder

Team information
- Current team: Cagliari
- Number: 27

Youth career
- 2024–: Cagliari

Senior career*
Years	Team	Apps	(Gls)
2022–2024	Atletico Lusaka		
2025–	Cagliari	4	(0)

International career^{‡}
2023	Zambia U17	3	(0)
2025–	Zambia	1	(0)
- * Club domestic league appearances and goals as of 25 May 2026 ‡ National team caps and goals as of 29 December 2025

Joseph Liteta (born 22 February 2006) is a Zambian professional footballer who plays as a midfielder for Serie A club Cagliari, and the Zambia national team.

== Early life ==
Joseph Liteta was born in Zambia. He began his career in Zambia, playing for Atletico Lusaka academy club.

== Club career ==
Liteta began his professional career in Zambia with Atletico Lusaka. In 2024, He was signed by Cagliari but the signing was not disclosed. He was deployed to Cagliari’s Primavera (Under-20) team which won the 2024–25 Coppa Italia Primavera, making him the first Zambian to win a football trophy in Italy.

Liteta made his debut for the senior squad of Cagliari on 26 October 2025 in a Serie A game against Hellas Verona.

== International career ==
He played in the 2022 COSAFA U16 tournament and was also part of the Zambia under 17 squad that participated in the 2023 U17 AFCON Algeria qualifiers. He later in 2023 participated in the 2023 U17 AFCON

Liteta was selected for Zambia's senior squad for the 2025 Africa Cup of Nations and made his debut in their last group stage game against Morocco on 29 December 2025, as Zambia lost 0–3 and was eliminated.

== Honors ==
Cagliari

- Coppa Italia Primavera: 2024–25
