= 2025–26 Serie A =

124th season of top-tier Italian football

Serie A
- Season: 2025–26
- Dates: 23 August 2025 – 24 May 2026
- Champions: Inter Milan; 21st title
- Relegated: Cremonese; Hellas Verona; Pisa
- Champions League: Inter Milan; Napoli; Roma; Como
- Europa League: AC Milan; Juventus
- Conference League: Atalanta
- Matches: 380
- Goals: 922 (2.43 per match)
- Top goalscorer: Lautaro Martínez (17 goals)
- Biggest home win: Como 6–0 Torino (24 January 2026)
- Biggest away win: Sassuolo 0–5 Inter Milan (8 February 2026)
- Highest scoring: Inter Milan 6–2 Pisa (23 January 2026)
- Longest winning run: Inter Milan (8 matches)
- Longest unbeaten run: AC Milan (24 matches)
- Longest winless run: Pisa (17 matches)
- Longest losing run: Hellas Verona (5 matches)
- Highest attendance: 75,681; AC Milan 0–0 Juventus (26 April 2026)
- Lowest attendance: 2,000; Lazio 2–1 Sassuolo (9 March 2026)
- Attendance: 11,680,772 (30,739 per match)

The 2025–26 Serie A (known as the Serie A Enilive and Serie A Made in Italy for sponsorship reasons domestically and abroad, respectively) was the 124th season of top-tier Italian football, the 94th in a round-robin tournament, and the 16th since its organization under an own league committee, the Lega Serie A. The season began on 23 August 2025 and concluded on 24 May 2026. Napoli were the defending champions, having won their fourth Serie A title in the previous season. Inter Milan won their 21st title with three matches to spare on 3 May 2026, following a 2–0 home win against Parma.

On 8 February 2026, a match between Milan and Como was scheduled to be held at Perth Stadium in Australia. Had it gone ahead, it would have been the first match from one of Europe's top five leagues to be played outside Europe. The fixture was scheduled to take place two days after the opening ceremony of the 2026 Winter Olympics at San Siro in the city of Milan, which rendered the stadium unavailable for the match; however, the match did not take place following a joint statement by the Government of Western Australia and Lega Serie A, which attributed the decision to what they described as the Asian Football Confederation's "escalation of further unacceptable demands".

== Teams ==
Twenty teams competed: the top seventeen teams from the previous season and three promoted teams from Serie B. The promoted teams included the two top teams from the Serie B table, and the winner of the promotion play-offs. Sassuolo returned to Serie A after one year away, becoming the first team to secure promotion, following their 3–1 victory over Modena and Spezia's 2–2 draw with Mantova. On the other end of the table, Monza were the first team to be relegated to Serie B, following a 0–4 loss to Atalanta, bringing an end to their three-year stint in Serie A. The remaining two relegation spots were decided on the final matchday, 25 May 2025, with Venezia and Empoli going down after their respective 2–3 and 1–2 losses to Juventus and Hellas Verona, ending their one and four-year spells in the league. Pisa made their return to Italy's top league following a 34-year absence, their longest in club history, after defeating Bari 1–0, combined with Spezia's 1–2 loss to Reggiana. The final team to earn promotion was Cremonese, who returned to the top flight after a two-year absence, following a 0–0 draw at home and a 3–2 away victory over Spezia in the second leg of the play-off final on 1 June.

=== Team changes ===
Promoted from 2024–25 Serie B	Relegated from 2024–25 Serie A
Sassuolo	Empoli
Pisa	Venezia
Cremonese	Monza

=== Stadiums and locations ===
Locations of the 2025–26 Serie A teams

Team	Location	Stadium	Capacity
Atalanta	Bergamo	Stadio di Bergamo	23,439
Bologna	Bologna	Stadio Renato Dall'Ara	38,279
Cagliari	Cagliari	Unipol Domus	16,416
Como	Como	Stadio Giuseppe Sinigaglia	13,602
Cremonese	Cremona	Stadio Giovanni Zini	20,641
Fiorentina	Florence	Stadio Artemio Franchi	43,118
Genoa	Genoa	Stadio Luigi Ferraris	33,205
Hellas Verona	Verona	Stadio Marcantonio Bentegodi	31,713
AC Milan	Milan	San Siro	75,710
Inter Milan	Milan	San Siro	75,710
Juventus	Turin	Allianz Stadium	41,507
Lazio	Rome	Stadio Olimpico	70,634
Roma	Rome	Stadio Olimpico	70,634
Lecce	Lecce	Stadio Via del Mare-Ettore Giardiniero	30,354
Napoli	Naples	Stadio Diego Armando Maradona	54,732
Parma	Parma	Stadio Ennio Tardini	22,352
Pisa	Pisa	Cetilar Arena	12,508
Sassuolo	Sassuolo	Mapei Stadium – Città del Tricolore	21,515
Torino	Turin	Stadio Olimpico Grande Torino	28,177
Udinese	Udine	Bluenergy Stadium	25,132

=== Number of teams by regions ===
No. of teams	Region	Team(s)
5	Lombardy	Atalanta, Como, Cremonese, Inter Milan and AC Milan
3	Emilia-Romagna	Bologna, Parma and Sassuolo
2	Lazio	Roma and Lazio
2	Piedmont	Juventus and Torino
2	Tuscany	Fiorentina and Pisa
1	Apulia	Lecce
1	Campania	Napoli
1	Friuli-Venezia Giulia	Udinese
1	Liguria	Genoa
1	Sardinia	Cagliari
1	Veneto	Hellas Verona

=== Personnel and kits ===
Team	Chairman	Manager	Captain	Kit maker	Shirt sponsor(s)	
Team	Chairman	Manager	Captain	Kit maker	Main	Other(s)
Atalanta	(Italy) Antonio Percassi	(Italy) Raffaele Palladino	(Netherlands) Marten de Roon	New Balance	Lete	List: Front: Snaifun; Back: Gewiss; Sleeves: zondacrypto
Bologna	(Canada) Joey Saputo	(Italy) Vincenzo Italiano	(Italy) Lorenzo De Silvestri	Macron	Saputo	List: Front: None; Back: Selenella; Sleeves: Lavoropiù
Cagliari	(Italy) Tommaso Giulini	(Italy) Fabio Pisacane	(Italy) Leonardo Pavoletti	EYE Sport	Sardegna	List: Front: Doppio Malto; Back: Banco di Sardegna; Sleeves: Bet365 Scores
Como	(Indonesia) Mirwan Suwarso	(Spain) Cesc Fàbregas	(France) Lucas Da Cunha	Adidas	Uber (Home & Away) / Revolut (Third)	List: Front: None; Back: Neuberger Berman; Sleeves: PokerStars News
Cremonese	(Italy) Giovanni Arvedi	(Italy) Marco Giampaolo	(Italy) Matteo Bianchetti	Acerbis	Ilta Inox (Home) / Arinox (Away)	List: Front: Acciaieria Arvedi; Back: Feraboli Lubrificanti; Sleeves: Arvedi Tubi Acciaio
Fiorentina	(United States) Giuseppe B. Commisso	(Italy) Paolo Vanoli	(Italy) Luca Ranieri	Kappa	Mediacom	List: Front: None; Back: Lamioni Holding; Sleeves: Betway Scores
Genoa	(Romania) Dan Șucu	(Italy) Daniele De Rossi	(Mexico) Johan Vásquez	Kappa	Pulsee Luce e Gas	List: Front: Rolling Stone; Back: None; Sleeves: Ceres
Hellas Verona	(United States) Italo Zanzi	(Italy) Paolo Sammarco (interim)	(Germany) Suat Serdar	Joma	Aircash	List: Front: None; Back: VetroCar; Sleeves: Drivalia
Inter Milan	(Italy) Giuseppe Marotta	(Romania) Cristian Chivu	(Argentina) Lautaro Martínez	Nike	Betsson.sport	List: Front: None; Back: U-Power; Sleeves: GATE.io
Juventus	(Italy) Gianluca Ferrero	(Italy) Luciano Spalletti	(Italy) Manuel Locatelli	Adidas	Jeep	List: Front: Visit Detroit; Back: Cygames; Sleeves: WhiteBIT
Lazio	(Italy) Claudio Lotito	(Italy) Maurizio Sarri	(Italy) Mattia Zaccagni	Mizuno	Polymarket	List: Front: None; Back: None; Sleeves: None
Lecce	(Italy) Saverio Sticchi Damiani	(Italy) Eusebio Di Francesco	(Italy) Wladimiro Falcone	M908	DEGHI	List: Front: BetItaly Pay; Back: DR Automobiles; Sleeves: Banca Popolare Pugliese
AC Milan	(Italy) Paolo Scaroni	(Italy) Massimiliano Allegri	(France) Mike Maignan	Puma	Emirates	List: Front: None; Back: Bitpanda; Sleeves: MSC Cruises
Napoli	(Italy) Aurelio De Laurentiis	(Italy) Antonio Conte	(Italy) Giovanni Di Lorenzo	EA7	MSC Cruises	List: Front: None; Back: Acqua Sorgesana; Sleeves: Dongfeng
Parma	(United States) Kyle Krause	(Spain) Carlos Cuesta	(Italy) Enrico Delprato	Puma	Prometeon	List: Front: AdmiralBet.news; Back: Moby; Sleeves: Crédit Agricole Italia
Pisa	(United States) Alexander Knaster	(Sweden) Oscar Hiljemark	(Italy) Antonio Caracciolo	Adidas	Cetilar	List: Front: Hi-Turf Solution; Back: Toni Luigi Scavi e Demolizioni; Sleeves: Bet365 Scores
Roma	(United States) Dan Friedkin	(Italy) Gian Piero Gasperini	(Italy) Stephan El Shaarawy	Adidas	Eurobet.live	List: Front: None; Back: Auberge Collection; Sleeves: Wizz Air
Sassuolo	(Italy) Carlo Rossi	(Italy) Fabio Grosso	(Italy) Filippo Romagna	Puma	Mapei	List: Front: None; Back: None; Sleeves: None
Torino	(Italy) Urbano Cairo	(Italy) Roberto D'Aversa	(Colombia) Duván Zapata	Joma	Suzuki	List: Front: Bet365 Scores; Back: EdiliziAcrobatica; Sleeves: JD Sports
Udinese	(Italy) Franco Soldati	(Germany) Kosta Runjaić	(Sweden) Jesper Karlström	Macron	Io sono Friuli-Venezia Giulia	List: Front: Banca 360 FVG; Back: Bluenergy; Sleeves: Bet365 Scores

=== Managerial changes ===
Team	Outgoing manager	Manner of departure	Position in the table	Date of vacancy	Incoming manager	Date of appointment
Fiorentina	(Italy) Raffaele Palladino	Resigned	Pre-season	30 May 2025	(Italy) Stefano Pioli	12 July 2025
Inter Milan	(Italy) Simone Inzaghi	Mutual consent	Pre-season	3 June 2025	(Romania) Cristian Chivu	9 June 2025
Parma	(Romania) Cristian Chivu	Mutual consent	Pre-season	9 June 2025	(Spain) Carlos Cuesta	1 July 2025
AC Milan	(Portugal) Sérgio Conceição	Sacked	Pre-season	30 June 2025	(Italy) Massimiliano Allegri	1 July 2025
Roma	(Italy) Claudio Ranieri	Retired	Pre-season	30 June 2025	(Italy) Gian Piero Gasperini	1 July 2025
Atalanta	(Italy) Gian Piero Gasperini	Mutual consent	Pre-season	30 June 2025	(Croatia) Ivan Jurić	1 July 2025
Lazio	(Italy) Marco Baroni	Sacked	Pre-season	30 June 2025	(Italy) Maurizio Sarri	1 July 2025
Cagliari	(Italy) Davide Nicola	Mutual consent	Pre-season	30 June 2025	(Italy) Fabio Pisacane	1 July 2025
Torino	(Italy) Paolo Vanoli	Mutual consent	Pre-season	30 June 2025	(Italy) Marco Baroni	1 July 2025
Lecce	(Italy) Marco Giampaolo	Mutual consent	Pre-season	30 June 2025	(Italy) Eusebio Di Francesco	1 July 2025
Pisa	(Italy) Filippo Inzaghi	Mutual consent	Pre-season	30 June 2025	(Italy) Alberto Gilardino	1 July 2025
Cremonese	(Italy) Giovanni Stroppa	End of contract	Pre-season	30 June 2025	(Italy) Davide Nicola	2 July 2025
Juventus	(Croatia) Igor Tudor	Sacked	8th	27 October 2025	(Italy) Massimo Brambilla (caretaker)	27 October 2025
Juventus	(Italy) Massimo Brambilla	End of caretaker spell	7th	30 October 2025	(Italy) Luciano Spalletti	30 October 2025
Genoa	(France) Patrick Vieira	Resigned	20th	1 November 2025	(Italy) Roberto Murgita (caretaker)	1 November 2025
Fiorentina	(Italy) Stefano Pioli	Sacked	20th	4 November 2025	(Italy) Daniele Galloppa (caretaker)	4 November 2025
Genoa	(Italy) Roberto Murgita	End of caretaker spell	18th	6 November 2025	(Italy) Daniele De Rossi	6 November 2025
Fiorentina	(Italy) Daniele Galloppa	End of caretaker spell	20th	7 November 2025	(Italy) Paolo Vanoli	7 November 2025
Atalanta	(Croatia) Ivan Jurić	Sacked	13th	10 November 2025	(Italy) Raffaele Palladino	11 November 2025
Pisa	(Italy) Alberto Gilardino	Sacked	19th	1 February 2026	(Sweden) Oscar Hiljemark	3 February 2026
Hellas Verona	(Italy) Paolo Zanetti	Sacked	20th	2 February 2026	(Italy) Paolo Sammarco (interim)	3 February 2026
Torino	(Italy) Marco Baroni	Sacked	15th	23 February 2026	(Italy) Roberto D'Aversa	23 February 2026
Cremonese	(Italy) Davide Nicola	Sacked	18th	18 March 2026	(Italy) Marco Giampaolo	18 March 2026

== League table ==
Pos	Team	Pld	W	D	L	GF	GA	GD	Pts	Qualification or relegation
1	Inter Milan (C)	38	27	6	5	89	35	+54	87	Qualification for the UEFA Champions League league phase
2	Napoli	38	23	7	8	58	36	+22	76	Qualification for the UEFA Champions League league phase
3	Roma	38	23	4	11	59	31	+28	73	Qualification for the UEFA Champions League league phase
4	Como	38	20	11	7	65	29	+36	71	Qualification for the UEFA Champions League league phase
5	AC Milan	38	20	10	8	53	35	+18	70	Qualification for the UEFA Europa League league phase (Note: Since the 2025–26 Coppa Italia winners, Inter Milan, qualified for the Champions League via league position, the Europa League spot awarded to the cup winners was passed to the sixth-placed team, and the Conference League spot was moved down one league position.)
6	Juventus	38	19	12	7	61	34	+27	69	Qualification for the UEFA Europa League league phase
7	Atalanta	38	15	14	9	51	36	+15	59	Qualification for the UEFA Conference League play-off round
8	Bologna	38	16	8	14	49	46	+3	56	
9	Lazio	38	14	12	12	41	40	+1	54	
10	Udinese	38	14	8	16	45	48	−3	50	
11	Sassuolo	38	14	7	17	46	50	−4	49	
12	Torino	38	12	9	17	44	63	−19	45 (Note: Torino finished ahead of Parma on head-to-head goal difference: Parma 2–1 Torino, Torino 4–1 Parma.)	
13	Parma	38	11	12	15	28	46	−18	45	
14	Cagliari	38	11	10	17	40	53	−13	43	
15	Fiorentina	38	9	15	14	41	50	−9	42	
16	Genoa	38	10	11	17	41	51	−10	41	
17	Lecce	38	10	8	20	28	50	−22	38	
18	Cremonese (R)	38	8	10	20	32	57	−25	34	Relegation to Serie B
19	Hellas Verona (R)	38	3	12	23	25	61	−36	21	Relegation to Serie B
20	Pisa (R)	38	2	12	24	26	71	−45	18	Relegation to Serie B

Source: Serie A
Rules for classification: 1) Points; 2) Tiebreaker for Champions team and third relegated team; 3) Head-to-head points; 4) Head-to-head goal difference; 5) Goal difference; 6) Goals scored; 7) Draw.
(Note: Head-to-head record is used only after all the matches between the teams in question have been played)
(C) Champions; (R) Relegated

== Results ==
Home \ Away	ATA	BOL	CAG	COM	CRE	FIO	GEN	VER	INT	JUV	LAZ	LEC	MIL	NAP	PAR	PIS	ROM	SAS	TOR	UDI
Atalanta	—	0–1	2–1	1–1	2–1	2–0	0–0	1–0	0–1	0–1	0–0	4–1	1–1	2–1	4–0	1–1	1–0	0–3	2–0	2–2
Bologna	0–2	—	0–0	1–0	1–3	1–2	2–1	1–2	3–3	0–1	0–2	2–0	0–3	2–0	0–1	4–0	0–2	1–1	0–0	1–0
Cagliari	3–2	0–2	—	1–2	1–0	1–1	3–3	4–0	0–2	1–0	0–0	0–2	0–1	0–1	2–0	2–2	1–0	1–2	2–1	0–2
Como	0–0	1–1	0–0	—	1–1	1–2	1–1	3–1	3–4	2–0	2–0	3–1	1–3	0–0	1–0	5–0	2–1	2–0	6–0	1–0
Cremonese	1–1	1–2	2–2	1–4	—	1–4	0–0	0–0	0–2	1–2	1–2	2–0	0–2	0–2	0–0	3–0	1–3	3–2	0–0	1–1
Fiorentina	1–1	2–2	1–2	1–2	1–0	—	0–0	1–2	1–1	1–1	1–0	0–1	1–1	1–3	0–0	1–0	1–2	0–0	2–2	5–1
Genoa	0–1	3–2	3–0	0–2	0–2	2–2	—	2–1	1–2	0–1	0–3	0–0	1–2	2–3	0–0	1–1	2–1	2–1	3–0	0–2
Hellas Verona	3–1	2–3	2–2	0–1	0–0	0–1	0–2	—	1–2	1–1	0–1	0–0	0–1	1–2	1–2	0–0	0–2	0–1	0–3	1–3
Inter Milan	1–1	3–1	3–0	4–0	4–1	3–0	2–0	1–1	—	3–2	2–0	1–0	0–1	2–2	2–0	6–2	5–2	2–1	5–0	1–2
Juventus	1–1	2–0	2–1	0–2	5–0	0–2	2–0	1–1	4–3	—	2–2	1–1	0–0	3–0	2–0	4–0	2–1	1–1	0–0	3–1
Lazio	0–2	1–1	2–0	0–3	0–0	2–2	3–2	4–0	0–3	1–0	—	2–0	1–0	0–2	1–1	2–1	0–1	2–1	3–3	3–3
Lecce	0–3	2–2	1–2	0–3	2–1	1–1	1–0	0–0	0–2	0–1	0–0	—	0–2	0–1	1–2	1–0	0–2	0–0	2–1	2–1
AC Milan	2–3	1–0	1–2	1–1	1–2	2–1	1–1	3–0	1–0	0–0	1–0	1–0	—	2–1	0–1	2–2	1–0	2–2	3–2	0–3
Napoli	3–1	2–3	1–0	0–0	4–0	2–1	2–1	2–2	3–1	2–1	0–2	2–1	1–0	—	0–0	3–2	2–2	1–0	2–1	1–0
Parma	1–1	1–3	1–1	0–0	0–2	1–0	0–0	2–1	0–2	1–4	0–1	0–1	2–2	1–1	—	1–0	2–3	1–0	2–1	0–2
Pisa	1–1	0–1	3–1	0–3	1–0	0–0	1–2	0–0	0–2	0–2	0–0	1–2	1–2	0–3	0–1	—	0–1	1–3	0–1	0–1
Roma	1–1	1–0	2–0	1–0	3–0	4–0	3–1	2–0	0–1	3–3	2–0	1–0	1–1	0–1	2–1	3–0	—	2–0	0–1	2–0
Sassuolo	2–1	0–1	2–1	2–1	1–0	3–1	1–2	3–0	0–5	0–3	1–0	2–3	2–0	0–2	1–1	2–2	0–1	—	0–1	3–1
Torino	0–3	1–2	1–2	1–5	1–0	0–0	2–1	2–1	2–2	2–2	2–0	1–0	2–3	1–0	4–1	2–2	0–2	2–1	—	1–2
Udinese	1–0	0–3	1–1	0–0	0–1	3–0	1–2	1–1	0–1	0–1	1–1	3–2	0–3	1–0	0–1	2–2	1–0	1–2	2–0	—

Source: Serie A
Legend: Blue = home team win; Yellow = draw; Red = away team win.
For upcoming matches, an "a" indicates there is an article about the rivalry between the two participants.

== Season statistics ==
=== Top goalscorers ===
Rank	Player	Club	Goals
1	(Argentina) Lautaro Martínez	Inter Milan	17
2	(Greece) Anastasios Douvikas	Como	14
2	(Netherlands) Donyell Malen	Roma	14
4	(France) Marcus Thuram	Inter Milan	13
5	(Denmark) Rasmus Højlund	Napoli	12
5	(Argentina) Nico Paz	Como	12
7	(Argentina) Giovanni Simeone	Torino	11
8	(Italy) Federico Bonazzoli	Cremonese	10
8	(England) Keinan Davis	Udinese	10
8	(Montenegro) Nikola Krstović	Atalanta	10
8	(Scotland) Scott McTominay	Napoli	10
8	(Italy) Riccardo Orsolini	Bologna	10
8	(Italy) Gianluca Scamacca	Atalanta	10
8	(Turkey) Kenan Yıldız	Juventus	10

=== Hat-tricks ===
Player	Club	Against	Result	Date
(Netherlands) Donyell Malen	Roma	Pisa	3–0 (H)	10 April 2026

Notes

(H) – Home team
(A) – Away team

=== Clean sheets ===
Rank	Player	Club	Clean sheets
1	(France) Jean Butez	Como	19
2	(Serbia) Mile Svilar	Roma	18
3	(Switzerland) Yann Sommer	Inter Milan	15
4	(Italy) Michele Di Gregorio	Juventus	14
4	(France) Mike Maignan	AC Milan	14
6	(Italy) Marco Carnesecchi	Atalanta	13
7	(Italy) Ivan Provedel	Lazio	12
8	(Indonesia) Emil Audero	Cremonese	11
8	(Serbia) Vanja Milinković-Savić	Napoli	11
10	(Spain) David De Gea	Fiorentina	10
10	(Italy) Wladimiro Falcone	Lecce	10
10	(Nigeria) Maduka Okoye	Udinese	10

=== Discipline ===
==== Player ====
- Most yellow cards: 12
  - (Croatia) Marin Pongračić (Fiorentina)
- Most red cards: 2
  - (Argentina) Mariano Troilo (Parma)
  - (Brazil) Wesley (Roma)

==== Club ====
- Most yellow cards: 83
  - Hellas Verona
- Fewest yellow cards: 47
  - Napoli
- Most red cards: 9
  - Lazio
- Fewest red cards: 0
  - Inter Milan

== Awards ==
=== Monthly awards ===
Month	Player of the Month		Rising Star of the Month		Coach of the Month		Goal of the Month		Ref.
Month	Player	Club	Player	Club	Coach	Club	Player	Club	Ref.
August	(Turkey) Kenan Yıldız	Juventus	(Argentina) Nico Paz	Como	(Italy) Davide Nicola	Cremonese	(Italy) Federico Bonazzoli	Cremonese	
September	(United States) Christian Pulisic	AC Milan	(Argentina) Nico Paz	Como	(Italy) Massimiliano Allegri	AC Milan	(Montenegro) Vasilije Adžić	Juventus	
October	(Cameroon) Frank Anguissa	Napoli	(Ivory Coast) Ange-Yoan Bonny	Inter Milan	(Italy) Gian Piero Gasperini	Roma	(Scotland) Scott McTominay	Napoli	
November	(England) Jamie Vardy	Cremonese	(Turkey) Kenan Yıldız	Juventus	(Italy) Massimiliano Allegri	AC Milan	(Poland) Piotr Zieliński	Inter Milan	
December	(Argentina) Lautaro Martínez	Inter Milan	(Denmark) Rasmus Højlund	Napoli	(Romania) Cristian Chivu	Inter Milan	(Turkey) Semih Kılıçsoy	Cagliari	
January	(Italy) Federico Dimarco	Inter Milan	(Croatia) Martin Baturina	Como	(Romania) Cristian Chivu	Inter Milan	(Ukraine) Ruslan Malinovskyi	Genoa	
February	(Netherlands) Donyell Malen	Roma	(Italy) Antonio Vergara	Napoli	(Italy) Raffaele Palladino	Atalanta	(Scotland) Scott McTominay	Napoli	
March	(Ivory Coast) Jérémie Boga	Juventus	(Turkey) Kenan Yıldız	Juventus	(Spain) Cesc Fàbregas	Como	(Portugal) Francisco Conceição	Juventus	
April	(France) Marcus Thuram	Inter Milan	(France) Arthur Atta	Udinese	(Italy) Luciano Spalletti	Juventus	(Turkey) Hakan Çalhanoğlu	Inter Milan	
May	(Argentina) Lautaro Martínez	Inter Milan	(Italy) Niccolò Pisilli	Roma	(Germany) Kosta Runjaić	Udinese	(England) Jonathan Rowe	Bologna	

=== Seasonal awards ===
Award	Winner	Club	Ref.
Most Valuable Player	(Italy) Federico Dimarco	Inter Milan	
Rising Star	(Turkey) Kenan Yıldız	Juventus	
Best Goalkeeper	(Serbia) Mile Svilar	Roma	
Best Defender	(Italy) Marco Palestra	Cagliari	
Best Midfielder	(Argentina) Nico Paz	Como	
Best Striker	(Argentina) Lautaro Martínez	Inter Milan	
Coach of the Season	(Romania) Cristian Chivu	Inter Milan	
Goal of the Season	(Portugal) Francisco Conceição	Juventus	
Fair Play Moment	(Serbia) Vanja Milinković-Savić	Napoli	

EA Sports Team of the Season
Goalkeeper	(France) Mike Maignan (AC Milan)			
Defence	(Italy) Marco Palestra (Cagliari)	(Spain) Jacobo Ramón (Como)	(Brazil) Bremer (Juventus)	(Italy) Federico Dimarco (Inter Milan)
Midfield	(Scotland) Scott McTominay (Napoli)	(Croatia) Luka Modrić (AC Milan)		(Poland) Piotr Zieliński (Inter Milan)
Attack	(Argentina) Nico Paz (Como)	(Argentina) Lautaro Martínez (Inter Milan)		(Turkey) Kenan Yıldız (Juventus)
Bench	(Serbia) Mile Svilar (Roma) (Ivory Coast) Evan Ndicka (Roma) (Switzerland) Manuel Akanji (Inter Milan) (France) Adrien Rabiot (AC Milan) (Argentina) Máximo Perrone (Como) (United States) Weston McKennie (Juventus) (Brazil) Wesley (Roma) (Croatia) Nikola Vlašić (Torino) (Denmark) Rasmus Højlund (Napoli) (Greece) Anastasios Douvikas (Como) (England) Keinan Davis (Udinese)			

AIC Serie A Team of the Year
Goalkeeper	(Serbia) Mile Svilar (Roma)			
Defence	(Italy) Marco Palestra (Cagliari)	(Switzerland) Manuel Akanji (Inter Milan)	(Italy) Alessandro Bastoni (Inter Milan)	(Italy) Federico Dimarco (Inter Milan)
Midfield	(Turkey) Hakan Çalhanoğlu (Inter Milan)	(Croatia) Luka Modrić (Milan)		(Scotland) Scott McTominay (Napoli)
Attack	(Argentina) Lautaro Martínez (Inter Milan)	(Netherlands) Donyell Malen (Roma)		(Argentina) Nico Paz (Como)

== Attendances ==
Serie A clubs listed by average home league attendance in the 2025–26 season:

Pos	Club	Average attendance
1	AC Milan	73,373
2	Internazionale	73,164
3	AS Roma	61,796
4	SSC Napoli	48,460
5	Juventus	40,712
6	Genoa CFC	31,075
7	SS Lazio	30,522
8	Bologna FC	27,742
9	US Lecce	25,842
10	Udinese	22,681
11	Hellas Verona	22,352
12	Atalanta	22,242
13	Fiorentina	20,400
14	Parma Calcio	18,689
15	Torino FC	18,179
16	Cagliari Calcio	16,007
17	US Sassuolo	14,213
18	Cremonese	12,259
19	Como 1907	11,451
20	Pisa SC	11,033

== See also ==
- 2025–26 Serie B
- 2025–26 Serie C
- 2025–26 Serie D
- 2025–26 Coppa Italia
- 2025–26 Serie A Femminile
