= 2023–24 Atalanta BC season =

Atalanta BC
2023–24 season
- President: Antonio Percassi
- Head coach: Gian Piero Gasperini
- Stadium: Gewiss Stadium
- Serie A: 4th
- Coppa Italia: Runners-up
- UEFA Europa League: Winners
- Top goalscorer: League: Teun Koopmeiners; Gianluca Scamacca (12 each); All: Gianluca Scamacca (19)
- Average home league attendance: 14,725
Home colours	Away colours	Third colours

The 2023–24 season was the 116th season in the history of Atalanta BC and the club's 13th consecutive season in the top flight. In addition to the domestic league, Atalanta participated in this season's editions of the Coppa Italia and the UEFA Europa League.

On 24 April 2024, the club booked their place in the 2024 Coppa Italia final with a 4–2 aggregate win over Fiorentina. Juventus also reached the final, ensuring that it would be a rematch of the 2021 Coppa Italia final. Atalanta would ultimately lose the match 1–0.

Following a 4–1 aggregate win over French side Marseille on 9 May, Atalanta qualified for the UEFA Europa League final for the first time in its history, and went on to win 3–0 against German side Bayer Leverkusen to claim its first trophy since 1963 and first ever European title.

== Players ==
=== First-team squad ===
As of 15 February 2024

Note: Flags indicate national team as defined under FIFA eligibility rules; some limited exceptions apply. Players may hold more than one non-FIFA nationality.

No.	Pos.	Nation	Player
1	GK	ARG	Juan Musso
2	DF	ITA	Rafael Tolói (captain)
3	DF	SWE	Emil Holm (on loan from Spezia)
4	DF	SWE	Isak Hien
6	DF	ARG	José Luis Palomino
7	MF	NED	Teun Koopmeiners
8	MF	CRO	Mario Pašalić
10	FW	MLI	El Bilal Touré
11	FW	NGR	Ademola Lookman
13	MF	BRA	Éderson
15	MF	NED	Marten de Roon (vice-captain)
17	MF	BEL	Charles De Ketelaere (on loan from Milan)

No.	Pos.	Nation	Player
19	DF	ALB	Berat Djimsiti
20	DF	NED	Mitchel Bakker
22	DF	ITA	Matteo Ruggeri
23	DF	BIH	Sead Kolašinac
25	MF	FRA	Michel Ndary Adopo
29	GK	ITA	Marco Carnesecchi
31	GK	ITA	Francesco Rossi
33	DF	NED	Hans Hateboer
42	DF	ITA	Giorgio Scalvini
59	MF	RUS	Aleksei Miranchuk
77	DF	ITA	Davide Zappacosta
90	FW	ITA	Gianluca Scamacca

== Transfers ==
=== Summer window ===
==== In ====
Date	Pos.	Player	From	Fee	Notes	Ref.
1 July 2023	FW	(Serbia) Vanja Vlahović	(Serbia) Partizan	€500,000	Joined Primavera squad	
6 July 2023	DF	(Bosnia and Herzegovina) Sead Kolašinac	(France) Marseille	Free		
7 July 2023	DF	(Netherlands) Mitchel Bakker	(Germany) Bayer Leverkusen	€10,000,000		
10 July 2023	MF	(France) Michel Ndary Adopo	(Italy) Torino	Free		
29 July 2023	FW	(Mali) El Bilal Touré	(Spain) Almería	€28,000,000	+ €3,000,000 add-ons	
7 August 2023	FW	(Italy) Gianluca Scamacca	(England) West Ham United	€25,000,000	+ €5,000,000 add-ons	

==== Loans in ====
Date	Pos.	Player	From	Fee	Notes	Ref.
16 August 2023	MF	(Belgium) Charles De Ketelaere	(Italy) Milan	€3,000,000	+ option to buy for €23,000,000 + €4,000,000 variables	
31 August 2023	DF	(Sweden) Emil Holm	(Italy) Spezia	€2,500,000	+ option to buy for €8,500,000	

==== Out ====
Date	Pos.	Player	To	Fee	Notes	Ref.
1 July 2023	FW	(Netherlands) Sam Lammers	(Scotland) Rangers	€3,500,000		
1 July 2023	MF	(Ukraine) Ruslan Malinovskyi	(France) Marseille	€10,000,000		
1 July 2023	MF	(Italy) Simone Muratore	Unattached	Released		
1 July 2023	GK	(Senegal) Khadim Ndiaye	Unattached	Released		
1 July 2023	MF	(Italy) Matteo Pessina	(Italy) Monza	€12,000,000		
1 July 2023	GK	(Italy) Marco Sportiello	(Italy) Milan	Free		
11 July 2023	DF	(Czech Republic) David Heidenreich	(Czech Republic) Hradec Králové	Undisclosed		
25 July 2023	FW	(Ivory Coast) Jérémie Boga	(France) Nice	€18,000,000	+ €2,000,000 add-ons	
27 July 2023	GK	(Italy) Stefano Mazzini	(Italy) Carrarese	Free		
1 August 2023	MF	(Italy) Marco Carraro	(Italy) SPAL	Free		
3 August 2023	FW	(Italy) Luca Vido	(Italy) Reggiana	Undisclosed		
5 August 2023	FW	(Denmark) Rasmus Højlund	(England) Manchester United	€75,000,000	+ €10,000,000 add-ons	
12 August 2023	DF	(Denmark) Joakim Mæhle	(Germany) VfL Wolfsburg	€12,000,000		
15 August 2023	FW	(Ivory Coast) Emmanuel Latte Lath	(England) Middlesbrough	€6,500,000		
19 August 2023	DF	(Turkey) Merih Demiral	(Saudi Arabia) Al-Ahli	€20,000,000		
25 August 2023	MF	(Italy) Guillaume Renault	(Italy) Pro Patria	Free		
1 September 2023	FW	(Italy) Salvatore Elia	(Italy) Spezia	Undisclosed		

==== Loans out ====
Date	Pos.	Player	To	Fee	Notes	Ref.
4 July 2023	DF	(Italy) Giorgio Cittadini	(Italy) Monza	Free		
13 July 2023	MF	(Italy) Andrea Oliveri	(Italy) Catanzaro	Free		
20 July 2023	MF	(Albania) Erdis Kraja	(Italy) Ascoli	Free	+ option to buy + buy-back option	
22 July 2023	FW	(Italy) Simone Mazzocchi	(Italy) Cosenza	Free		
22 July 2023	DF	(Italy) Federico Zuccon	(Italy) Cosenza	Free		
27 July 2023	DF	(Italy) Tommaso Cavalli	(Italy) Mantova	Free	+ option to buy + buy-back option	
27 July 2023	MF	(Italy) Simone Panada	(Italy) Sampdoria	Free	+ option to buy + buy-back option	
25 August 2023	FW	(Italy) Nicolò Cambiaghi	(Italy) Empoli	Free		
25 August 2023	MF	(Ukraine) Viktor Kovalenko	(Italy) Empoli	Free	+ option to buy for €1,500,000	
31 August 2023	DF	(France) Brandon Soppy	(Italy) Torino	Free	+ option to buy for €6,000,000	
31 August 2023	FW	(Italy) Roberto Piccoli	(Italy) Lecce	Free	+ option to buy for €12,000,000 + buy-back option for €15,000,000	
31 August 2023	DF	(Equatorial Guinea) Hugo Buyla	(Italy) Sampdoria	Free	+ option to buy	
1 September 2023	FW	(The Gambia) Ebrima Colley	(Switzerland) Young Boys	€250,000	+ option to buy	
1 September 2023	DF	(Italy) Caleb Okoli	(Italy) Frosinone	€100,000		
1 September 2023	FW	(Colombia) Duván Zapata	(Italy) Torino	Free	+ obligation to buy for €10,000,000 under conditions	
2 September 2023	DF	(Italy) Giorgio Brogni	(Italy) Gubbio	Free		

=== Winter window ===
==== In ====
Date	Pos.	Player	From	Fee	Notes	Ref.
2 January 2024	DF	(Sweden) Isak Hien	(Italy) Hellas Verona	€8,500,000	+ €3,500,000 add-ons	
31 January 2024	DF	(France) Brandon Soppy	(Italy) Torino	Free	Loan termination	

==== Out ====
Date	Pos.	Player	To	Fee	Notes	Ref.
15 February 2024	FW	(Colombia) Luis Muriel	(United States) Orlando City	€1,000,000		

==== Loans out ====
Date	Pos.	Player	To	Fee	Notes	Ref.
18 January 2024	DF	(Italy) Nadir Zortea	(Italy) Frosinone	Free		
31 January 2024	DF	(France) Brandon Soppy	(Germany) Schalke 04	Free		

== Pre-season and friendlies ==
Win Draw Loss Fixtures

16 July 2023 Friendly	Rappresentativa di Clusone (Italy)	1–10	(Italy) Atalanta	Clusone, Italy
17:00 CEST (UTC+2)	Camanini 75'	Report	Éderson 5'; Bonfanti 14'; Bakker 17'; Mæhle 44'; Koopmeiners 55'; Zappacosta 57'; Zortea 71'; Højlund 73'; Lookman 78', 79'	Stadium: Centro Sportivo "Città di Clusone"; Referee: Davide Cerea (Italy)
Note: Match was played in two halves of forty minutes each.

20 July 2023 Friendly	Atalanta (Italy)	11–0	(Italy) Rappresentativa Val Seriana	Clusone, Italy
17:00 CEST (UTC+2)	Zappacosta 4'; Højlund 12'; Boga 20'; Latte Lath 22'; Lookman 58', 80'; Pašalić 63', 67', 72'; Koopmeiners 75'; Mæhle 83'	Report		Stadium: Centro Sportivo "Città di Clusone"; Referee: Alessandro Pizzi (Italy)
Note: Second half was shortened to forty minutes.

22 July 2023 Friendly	Atalanta (Italy)	10–0	(Switzerland) Locarno	Clusone, Italy
17:00 CEST (UTC+2)	Lookman 8', 28'; Pašalić 22'; Mæhle 30'; Zappacosta 40'; Adopo 62'; Muriel 69', 78'; Koopmeiners 83', 90'	Report		Stadium: Centro Sportivo "Città di Clusone"; Referee: Davide Ghersini (Italy)

26 July 2023 Friendly	Atalanta (Italy)	6–0	(Italy) Pro Vercelli	Ciserano, Italy
17:00 CEST (UTC+2)	Latte Lath 17', 43', 46'; Adopo 18'; Pašalić 39'; Lookman 78'	Report		Stadium: Centro Sportivo Bortolotti; Referee: Andrea Colombo (Italy)

29 July 2023 Friendly	Bournemouth (England)	1–3	(Italy) Atalanta	Bournemouth, England
15:00 BST (UTC+1)	Senesi 38'	Report	Mæhle 7'; Koopmeiners 36'; Latte Lath 86'	Stadium: Dean Court; Referee: Craig Pawson (England)

2 August 2023 Friendly	Atalanta (Italy)	3–0	(Italy) Pro Sesto	Ciserano, Italy
16:00 CEST (UTC+2)	Bonfanti 4'; Bakker 54'; Scalvini 87'	Report		Stadium: Centro Sportivo Bortolotti; Referee: Matteo Marcenaro (Italy)

5 August 2023 Friendly	Union Berlin (Germany)	4–1	(Italy) Atalanta	Berlin, Germany
15:30 CEST (UTC+2)	Laïdouni 8'; Behrens 25', (yellow card) 39'; Fofana 28', 51'; Král (yellow card) 54'	Report	Pašalić 33'; Bakker (yellow card) 35'; Lookman (yellow card) 64'	Stadium: Stadion An der Alten Försterei; Attendance: 20,065; Referee: Eric Weisbach (Germany)

9 August 2023 Friendly	Atalanta (Italy)	3–0	(Italy) Pergolettese	Ciserano, Italy
16:00 CEST (UTC+2)	Zapata 45'; Scamacca 54'; Muriel 88'	Report		Stadium: Centro Sportivo Bortolotti; Referee: Nicolò Rodegari (Italy)

12 August 2023 Friendly	Juventus (Italy)	0–0	(Italy) Atalanta	Cesena, Italy
20:30 CEST (UTC+2)	Alex Sandro (yellow card) 43'	Report	Scalvini (yellow card) 17'	Stadium: Stadio Dino Manuzzi; Attendance: 18,333; Referee: Ermanno Feliciani (Italy)

11 January 2024 Friendly	Atalanta (Italy)	11–0	(Italy) Real Calepina	Ciserano, Italy
15:00 CET (UTC+1)	Scamacca 7', 40'; Zappacosta 25', 36'; Zortea 29'; Adopo 58', 59'; Touré 63', 67'; Muriel 73'; Bakker 79'	Report		Stadium: Centro Sportivo Bortolotti; Referee: Marco Gambirasio (Italy)
Note: Second half was shortened to thirty-five minutes.

== Competitions ==
=== Overall record ===
Competition	First match	Last match	Starting round	Final position	Record							
Competition	First match	Last match	Starting round	Final position	Pld	W	D	L	GF	GA	GD	Win %
Serie A	20 August 2023	2 June 2024	Matchday 1	4th	38	21	6	11	72	42	+30	55.26
Coppa Italia	3 January 2024	15 May 2024	Round of 16	Runners-up	5	3	0	2	9	5	+4	60.00
UEFA Europa League	21 September 2023	22 May 2024	Group stage	Winners	13	8	4	1	25	8	+17	61.54
Total					56	32	10	14	106	55	+51	57.14

Source: Soccerway

=== Serie A ===
==== League table ====
Pos	Team	Pld	W	D	L	GF	GA	GD	Pts	Qualification or relegation
2	Milan	38	22	9	7	76	49	+27	75	Qualification for the Champions League league phase (Note: Serie A gained an additional Champions League place as a result of Italy finishing as one of the two associations with the highest coefficient points in 2023–24.)
3	Juventus	38	19	14	5	54	31	+23	71	Qualification for the Champions League league phase
4	Atalanta	38	21	6	11	72	42	+30	69	Qualification for the Champions League league phase
5	Bologna	38	18	14	6	54	32	+22	68	Qualification for the Champions League league phase
6	Roma	38	18	9	11	65	46	+19	63	Qualification for the Europa League league phase (Note: Since the winners of the 2023–24 Coppa Italia, Juventus, qualified for the Champions League, the Europa League berth awarded to the Coppa Italia winners was passed to the seventh-placed team, and the Conference League berth was passed to the eighth-placed team.)

Source: Serie A
Rules for classification: 1) Points; 2) Tiebreaker for Champions team and third relegated team; 3) Head-to-head points; 4) Head-to-head goal difference; 5) Goal difference; 6) Goals scored; 7) Draw.
(Note: Head-to-head record is used only after all the matches between the teams in question have been played)

==== Results summary ====
Overall								Home						Away					
Pld	W	D	L	GF	GA	GD	Pts	W	D	L	GF	GA	GD	W	D	L	GF	GA	GD
38	21	6	11	72	42	+30	69	14	2	4	44	17	+27	7	4	7	28	25	+3

Source: Serie A

==== Results by round ====
Round	1	2	3	4	5	6	7	8	9	10	11	12	13	14	15	16	17	18	19	20	22	23	24	25	26	21^{1}	27	28	30	31	32	33	34	35	36	37	38	29^{2}
Ground	A	A	H	A	H	A	H	A	H	A	H	A	H	A	H	H	A	H	A	H	H	H	A	H	A	A	H	A	A	A	H	A	H	A	H	A	H	H
Result	W	L	W	L	W	W	D	L	W	W	L	D	L	L	W	W	L	W	D	W	W	W	W	W	D	L	L	D	W	L	D	W	W	W	W	W	W	L
Position	4	8	5	10	6	4	6	6	6	4	5	5	7	8	8	7	8	6	6	5	5	4	4	4	4	5	6	6	6	6	6	6	6	5	5	5	4	4

Source: Serie A
A = Away; H = Home; W = Win; D = Draw; L = Loss

^{1} Matchday 21 (vs Internazionale) was postponed to 28 February 2024 due to Inter's participation in the 2023 Supercoppa Italiana.
^{2} Matchday 29 (vs Fiorentina) was postponed to 2 June 2024 due to the condition of Fiorentina president Joe Barone.

==== Matches ====
The league fixtures were announced on 5 July 2023.

20 August 2023 1	Sassuolo	0–2	Atalanta	Reggio Emilia
18:30 CEST (UTC+2)		Report	De Ketelaere 83'; Zortea 90+3'	Stadium: Mapei Stadium – Città del Tricolore; Attendance: 12,298; Referee: Matteo Marchetti

26 August 2023 2	Frosinone	2–1	Atalanta	Frosinone
18:30 CEST (UTC+2)	Harroui 5'; Monterisi 24'; Barrenechea (yellow card) 28'	Report	Lookman (yellow card) 40'; De Roon (yellow card) 45+4'; Zapata 56'	Stadium: Stadio Benito Stirpe; Attendance: 13,426; Referee: Juan Luca Sacchi

2 September 2023 3	Atalanta	3–0	Monza	Bergamo
20:45 CEST (UTC+2)	Éderson 35'; Scamacca 42', 62'	Report	Pessina (yellow card) 44'; Marí (yellow card) 59'; Izzo (yellow card) 83'	Stadium: Gewiss Stadium; Attendance: 14,985; Referee: Matteo Marcenaro

17 September 2023 4	Fiorentina	3–2	Atalanta	Florence
18:00 CEST (UTC+2)	Bonaventura 35'; Martínez Quarta 45'; Kouamé 76'; Parisi (yellow card) 87'	Report	Koopmeiners 20'; De Roon (yellow card) 34'; Lookman 53'; Zortea (yellow card) 65'	Stadium: Stadio Artemio Franchi; Attendance: 32,100; Referee: Luca Pairetto

24 September 2023 5	Atalanta	2–0	Cagliari	Bergamo
15:00 CEST (UTC+2)	Lookman 33'; Djimsiti (yellow card) 54'; Pašalić 76'	Report	Deiola (yellow card) 32'; Luvumbo (yellow card) 42'	Stadium: Gewiss Stadium; Attendance: 14,739; Referee: Ermanno Feliciani

27 September 2023 6	Hellas Verona	0–1	Atalanta	Verona
18:30 CEST (UTC+2)	Ngonge (yellow card) 54'; Folorunsho (yellow card) 68'	Report	Koopmeiners 13'; Éderson (yellow card) 50'; De Roon (yellow card) 62'; Djimsiti (yellow card) 67'; Tolói (yellow card) 77'	Stadium: Stadio Marcantonio Bentegodi; Attendance: 15,965; Referee: Federico Dionisi

1 October 2023 7	Atalanta	0–0	Juventus	Bergamo
18:00 CEST (UTC+2)	Holm (yellow card) 90+4'	Report	Rabiot (yellow card) 45'; Danilo (yellow card) 53'	Stadium: Gewiss Stadium; Attendance: 14,811; Referee: Daniele Chiffi

8 October 2023 8	Lazio	3–2	Atalanta	Rome
15:00 CEST (UTC+2)	De Ketelaere 5' (o.g.); Castellanos 11'; Vecino 83', (yellow card) 84'	Report	Éderson 33'; Kolašinac 63'; Ruggeri (yellow card) 79'	Stadium: Stadio Olimpico; Attendance: 41,500; Referee: Daniele Orsato

22 October 2023 9	Atalanta	2–0	Genoa	Bergamo
18:00 CEST (UTC+2)	Lookman (yellow card) 42', (goal) 68'; Tolói (yellow card) 53'; Hateboer (yellow card) 86'; Zappacosta (yellow card) 90'; Éderson 90+5'	Report	Guðmundsson (yellow card) 56'; Bani (yellow card) 90+7'	Stadium: Gewiss Stadium; Attendance: 14,848; Referee: Livio Marinelli

30 October 2023 10	Empoli	0–3	Atalanta	Empoli
18:30 CET (UTC+1)	Maleh (yellow card) 33'; Cacace (yellow card) 35'; Gyasi (yellow card) 69'; Fazzini (yellow card) 85'	Report	Scamacca 5', 51'; Koopmeiners 29'	Stadium: Stadio Carlo Castellani; Attendance: 7,825; Referee: Luca Massimi

4 November 2023 11	Atalanta	1–2	Internazionale	Bergamo
18:00 CET (UTC+1)	De Roon (yellow card) 26'; Kolašinac (yellow card) 35'; Scamacca 61'; Tolói (yellow card) 86' (yellow-red card) 90+2'	Report	Çalhanoğlu 40' (pen.); Martínez 57'; Dumfries (yellow card) 89'	Stadium: Gewiss Stadium; Attendance: 14,945; Referee: Simone Sozza

12 November 2023 12	Udinese	1–1	Atalanta	Udine
15:00 CET (UTC+1)	Success (penalty missed) 31'; Ferreira (yellow card) 42'; Walace 44'; Bijol (yellow card) 77'	Report	Koopmeiners (yellow card) 59'; De Roon (yellow card) 89'; Éderson 90+2'	Stadium: Stadio Friuli; Attendance: 23,100; Referee: Gianluca Aureliano

25 November 2023 13	Atalanta	1–2	Napoli	Bergamo
18:00 CET (UTC+1)	Djimsiti (yellow card) 27'; Lookman 53'; Kolašinac (yellow card) 64'	Report	Natan (yellow card) 21'; Kvaratskhelia 44'; Di Lorenzo (yellow card) 60'; Elmas 79'	Stadium: Gewiss Stadium; Attendance: 14,743; Referee: Maurizio Mariani

4 December 2023 14	Torino	3–0	Atalanta	Turin
20:45 CET (UTC+1)	Linetty (yellow card) 5'; Zapata 22', 90+5'; Buongiorno (yellow card) 45+1'; Sanabria 56' (pen.)	Report	Scalvini (yellow card) 9'; De Roon (yellow card) 75'	Stadium: Stadio Olimpico Grande Torino; Attendance: 18,507; Referee: Marco Piccinini

9 December 2023 15	Atalanta	3–2	Milan	Bergamo
18:00 CET (UTC+1)	Lookman 38', 55'; Éderson (yellow card) 72'; Muriel 90+5'	Report	Giroud 45+3'; Reijnders (yellow card) 71'; Jović 80', (yellow card) 88'; Calabria (yellow card) 81' (yellow-red card) 90+3'; Bennacer (yellow card) 90+3'	Stadium: Gewiss Stadium; Attendance: 14,907; Referee: Federico La Penna

18 December 2023 16	Atalanta	4–1	Salernitana	Bergamo
20:45 CET (UTC+1)	Muriel 47'; Pašalić 52'; Ruggeri (yellow card) 77'; De Ketelaere 83'; Miranchuk 89'	Report	Pirola 10', (yellow card) 40'; Maggiore (yellow card) 65'	Stadium: Gewiss Stadium; Attendance: 14,264; Referee: Ermanno Feliciani

23 December 2023 17	Bologna	1–0	Atalanta	Bologna
15:00 CET (UTC+1)	Posch (yellow card) 30'; Freuler (yellow card) 70'; Ferguson 86'	Report	De Roon (yellow card) 69'; Zappacosta (yellow card) 79'; Hateboer (yellow card) 88'; Scamacca (yellow card) 90+5'	Stadium: Stadio Renato Dall'Ara; Attendance: 28,082; Referee: Antonio Rapuano

30 December 2023 18	Atalanta	1–0	Lecce	Bergamo
12:30 CET (UTC+1)	Zappacosta (yellow card) 35'; Lookman 58'; Holm (yellow card) 90+5'	Report	Ramadani (yellow card) 82'; Oudin (yellow card) 90+5'	Stadium: Gewiss Stadium; Attendance: 14,864; Referee: Gianluca Manganiello

7 January 2024 19	Roma	1–1	Atalanta	Rome
20:45 CET (UTC+1)	Dybala 39' (pen.); Kristensen (yellow card) 63'	Report	Koopmeiners 8', (yellow card) 55'; Scalvini (yellow card) 29'; Ruggeri (yellow card) 38'; Éderson (yellow card) 43'; Zappacosta (yellow card) 74'; Holm (yellow card) 90'	Stadium: Stadio Olimpico; Attendance: 60,022; Referee: Gianluca Aureliano

15 January 2024 20	Atalanta	5–0	Frosinone	Bergamo
20:45 CET (UTC+1)	Koopmeiners 8' (pen.); Éderson 13'; De Ketelaere 14'; Zappacosta 83'; Holm 90'	Report	Romagnoli (yellow card) 70'	Stadium: Gewiss Stadium; Attendance: 14,195; Referee: Alessandro Prontera

27 January 2024 22	Atalanta	2–0	Udinese	Bergamo
15:00 CET (UTC+1)	Miranchuk 33'; Scamacca 45+1'; Pašalić (yellow card) 75'; Éderson (yellow card) 77'	Report	Kristensen (yellow card) 28'	Stadium: Gewiss Stadium; Attendance: 14,716; Referee: Marco Piccinini

4 February 2024 23	Atalanta	3–1	Lazio	Bergamo
18:00 CET (UTC+1)	Pašalić (yellow card) 9', (goal) 16'; De Ketelaere 43' (pen.), 76'; Éderson (yellow card) 78'	Report	Felipe Anderson (yellow card) 45'; Luis Alberto (yellow card) 45+1'; Rovella (yellow card) 47'; Immobile 84' (pen.)	Stadium: Gewiss Stadium; Attendance: 14,492; Referee: Marco Guida

11 February 2024 24	Genoa	1–4	Atalanta	Genoa
18:00 CET (UTC+1)	Strootman (yellow card) 24'; Malinovskyi 51'; Bani (yellow card) 54'; Martín (yellow card) 90+3'	Report	De Ketelaere 22', (yellow card) 24'; Kolašinac (yellow card) 32'; Koopmeiners 55'; De Roon (yellow card) 90+2'; Miranchuk (yellow card) 90+7'; Zappacosta 90+10'; Touré 90+13'	Stadium: Stadio Luigi Ferraris; Attendance: 31,201; Referee: Andrea Colombo

17 February 2024 25	Atalanta	3–0	Sassuolo	Bergamo
20:45 CET (UTC+1)	Pašalić 22'; Koopmeiners 58'; Bakker 75'	Report	Pinamonti (penalty missed) 45+5'	Stadium: Gewiss Stadium; Attendance: 14,474; Referee: Alessandro Prontera

25 February 2024 26	Milan	1–1	Atalanta	Milan
20:45 CET (UTC+1)	Leão 3', (yellow card) 45+3'	Report	Koopmeiners 42' (pen.); De Roon (yellow card) 44'; Holm (yellow card) 45+3'; Lookman (yellow card) 56'; Éderson (yellow card) 90+4'	Stadium: San Siro; Attendance: 71,264; Referee: Daniele Orsato

28 February 2024 21	Internazionale	4–0	Atalanta	Milan
20:45 CET (UTC+1)	Darmian (yellow card) 23', (goal) 26'; Martínez 45+1', (penalty missed) 54'; Dimarco 54'; Frattesi 71'; Bastoni (yellow card) 76'	Report	Éderson (yellow card) 45'; Djimsiti (yellow card) 53'; Hien (yellow card) 65'; Bakker (yellow card) 71'; Touré (yellow card) 90'; Lookman (yellow card) 90+5'	Stadium: San Siro; Attendance: 71,422; Referee: Andrea Colombo
Note: The match was originally scheduled for 21 January 2024, but was postponed due to Internazionale's participation in the 2023 Supercoppa Italiana.

3 March 2024 27	Atalanta	1–2	Bologna	Bergamo
18:00 CET (UTC+1)	Koopmeiners (yellow card) 14'; Lookman 28'; Holm (yellow card) 64'; Éderson (yellow card) 69'	Report	Posch (yellow card) 6'; Zirkzee 57' (pen.); Ferguson 61'; Odgaard (yellow card) 90+5'	Stadium: Gewiss Stadium; Attendance: 14,931; Referee: Federico La Penna

10 March 2024 28	Juventus	2–2	Atalanta	Turin
18:00 CET (UTC+1)	Cambiaso 66'; Milik 70'	Report	Koopmeiners 35', 75'; Hateboer (yellow card) 90+3'	Stadium: Juventus Stadium; Attendance: 39,206; Referee: Marco Guida

30 March 2024 30	Napoli	0–3	Atalanta	Naples
12:30 CET (UTC+1)	Osimhen (yellow card) 38'; Di Lorenzo (yellow card) 84'	Report	Miranchuk 26'; Scamacca 45'; Kolašinac (yellow card) 54'; Koopmeiners (yellow card) 82', (goal) 88'	Stadium: Stadio Diego Armando Maradona; Attendance: 49,500; Referee: Luca Pairetto

7 April 2024 31	Cagliari	2–1	Atalanta	Cagliari
18:00 CEST (UTC+2)	Augello 42'; Deiola (yellow card) 66'; Luvumbo (yellow card) 75'; Nández (yellow card) 75'; Viola 88'	Report	Scamacca 13'; De Roon (yellow card) 54'; Zappacosta (yellow card) 63'; Tolói (yellow card) 74'	Stadium: Unipol Domus; Attendance: 16,342; Referee: Antonio Rapuano

15 April 2024 32	Atalanta	2–2	Hellas Verona	Bergamo
20:45 CEST (UTC+2)	Scamacca 13'; Éderson 18'	Report	Suslov (yellow card) 42'; Lazović 56'; Noslin 60'; Silva (yellow card) 83'	Stadium: Gewiss Stadium; Attendance: 14,666; Referee: Juan Luca Sacchi

21 April 2024 33	Monza	1–2	Atalanta	Monza
20:45 CEST (UTC+2)	Birindelli (yellow card) 3'; Izzo (yellow card) 66'; Maldini 89'; Bondo (yellow card) 90+4'	Report	De Ketelaere 44'; Touré 72'; Djimsiti (yellow card) 83'; Hien (yellow card) 90+3'	Stadium: Stadio Brianteo; Attendance: 13,983; Referee: Antonio Giua

28 April 2024 34	Atalanta	2–0	Empoli	Bergamo
18:00 CEST (UTC+2)	Pašalić 42' (pen.); Lookman 51'; Scalvini (yellow card) 82'	Report	Luperto (yellow card) 24'; Kovalenko (yellow card) 77'	Stadium: Gewiss Stadium; Attendance: 14,614; Referee: Michael Fabbri

6 May 2024 35	Salernitana	1–2	Atalanta	Salerno
18:00 CEST (UTC+2)	Tchaouna 18'; Pasalidis (yellow card) 45+1'	Report	Scamacca 57'; Koopmeiners 63'	Stadium: Stadio Arechi; Attendance: 12,980; Referee: Ermano Feliciani

12 May 2024 36	Atalanta	2–1	Roma	Bergamo
20:45 CEST (UTC+2)	De Ketelaere 18', 20'; Koopmeiners (yellow card) 58'	Report	Ndicka (yellow card) 46'; Pellegrini 66' (pen.)	Stadium: Gewiss Stadium; Attendance: 14,895; Referee: Marco Guida

18 May 2024 37	Lecce	0–2	Atalanta	Lecce
18:00 CEST (UTC+2)		Report	Hateboer (yellow card) 25'; Touré (yellow card) 37'; Pašalić (yellow card) 44'; De Ketelaere 48'; Scamacca 53'; Tolói (yellow card) 67'	Stadium: Stadio Via del mare Attendance: 26,354; Referee: Antonio Rapuano

26 May 2024 38	Atalanta	3–0	Torino	Bergamo
18:00 CEST (UTC+2)	Scamacca 26'; Lookman 43'; Pašalić 71' (pen.); Hien (yellow card) 77'	Report	Linetty (yellow card) 58'	Stadium: Gewiss Stadium; Attendance: 14,839; Referee: Simone Sozza

2 June 2024 29	Atalanta	2–3	Fiorentina	Bergamo
18:00 CEST (UTC+2)	Lookman 12'; Scalvini 32'	Report	Belotti 6', 45+1'; González 19'; Martínez Quarta (yellow card) 75'; Ranieri (yellow card) 85'	Stadium: Gewiss Stadium; Attendance: 14,851; Referee: Daniele Orsato
Note: The match was originally scheduled for 17 March 2024, but was postponed after Fiorentina sporting director Joe Barone fell ill and was rushed to hospital.

=== Coppa Italia ===
3 January 2024 Round of 16	Atalanta	3–1	Sassuolo	Bergamo
18:00 CET (UTC+1)	De Ketelaere 24', 63'; Miranchuk 71'	Report	Ceide (yellow card) 54'; Boloca 90+5'	Stadium: Gewiss Stadium; Attendance: 13,509; Referee: Alberto Santoro

10 January 2024 Quarter-finals	Milan	1–2	Atalanta	Milan
21:00 CET (UTC+1)	Leão 45', (yellow card) 80'; Hernandez (yellow card) 58'; Mirante (red card) 90+5'	Report	Koopmeiners 45+2', 59' (pen.); Éderson (yellow card) 90'	Stadium: San Siro; Attendance: 64,036; Referee: Marco Di Bello
Note: Mirante was sent off for dissent as an unused substitute.

3 April 2024 Semi-finals; First leg	Fiorentina	1–0	Atalanta	Florence
21:00 CEST (UTC+2)	Mandragora 31', (yellow card) 55'; Kouamé (yellow card) 81'	Report	Miranchuk (yellow card) 29'; De Roon (yellow card) 79'; Scamacca (yellow card) 90'	Stadium: Stadio Artemio Franchi; Attendance: 21,560; Referee: Maurizio Mariani

24 April 2024 Semi-finals; Second leg	Atalanta	4–1 (4–2 agg.)	Fiorentina	Bergamo
21:00 CEST (UTC+2)	Koopmeiners 8'; Kolašinac (yellow card) 56'; Scamacca 75', (yellow card) 80'; Lookman 90+5'; Pašalić 90+8'	Report	Mandragora (yellow card) 43'; Milenković (red card) 53'; Martínez Quarta 68'; Dodô (yellow card) 69'	Stadium: Gewiss Stadium; Attendance: 14,909; Referee: Federico La Penna

15 May 2024 Final	Atalanta	0–1	Juventus	Rome
21:00 CEST (UTC+2)	Hien (yellow card) 17'; Djimsiti (yellow card) 78'; Tolói (yellow card) 90+6'	Report	Vlahović 4', (yellow card) 56'; Bremer (yellow card) 90+1'	Stadium: Stadio Olimpico; Attendance: 66,854; Referee: Fabio Maresca

=== UEFA Europa League ===
==== Group stage ====
The draw for the group stage was held on 1 September 2023.

Pos	Team	Pld	W	D	L	GF	GA	GD	Pts	Qualification	ATA	SCP	STU	RAK
1	(Italy) Atalanta	6	4	2	0	12	4	+8	14	Advance to round of 16	—	1–1	1–0	2–0
2	(Portugal) Sporting CP	6	3	2	1	10	6	+4	11	Advance to knockout round play-offs	1–2	—	3–0	2–1
3	(Austria) Sturm Graz	6	1	1	4	4	9	−5	4 (Note: Tied on head-to-head results. Overall goal difference used as a tiebreaker.)	Transfer to Europa Conference League	2–2	1–2	—	0–1
4	(Poland) Raków Częstochowa	6	1	1	4	3	10	−7	4		0–4	1–1	0–1	—

Source: UEFA
Rules for classification: Group stage tiebreakers
Notes:

21 September 2023 1	Atalanta (Italy)	2–0	(Poland) Raków Częstochowa	Bergamo, Italy
21:00 CEST (UTC+2)	De Roon (yellow card) 32'; De Ketelaere 49'; Éderson 66'	Report		Stadium: Stadio Atleti Azzurri d'Italia; Attendance: 13,698; Referee: Roi Reinshreiber (Israel)

5 October 2023 2	Sporting CP (Portugal)	1–2	(Italy) Atalanta	Lisbon, Portugal
17:45 WEST (UTC+1)	Gyökeres 76' (pen.); Gonçalves (yellow card) 84'	Report	Scalvini 33', (yellow card) 76'; Ruggeri 43'; Djimsiti (yellow card) 51'; Tolói (yellow card) 60'; Scamacca (yellow card) 90+2'	Stadium: Estádio José Alvalade; Attendance: 42,301; Referee: Alejandro Hernández Hernández (Spain)

26 October 2023 3	Sturm Graz (Austria)	2–2	(Italy) Atalanta	Graz, Austria
18:45 CEST (UTC+2)	Prass 13'; Kiteishvili (yellow card) 45+2'; Hierländer (yellow card) 45+8' (yellow-red card) 52'; Włodarczyk 80' (pen.)	Report	Muriel 34', 45+7' (pen.); Lookman (yellow card) 45+8'; Bakker (yellow card) 82'	Stadium: Liebenauer Stadium; Attendance: 14,167; Referee: Duje Strukan (Croatia)

9 November 2023 4	Atalanta (Italy)	1–0	(Austria) Sturm Graz	Bergamo, Italy
21:00 CET (UTC+1)	Djimsiti 50'	Report	Stanković (yellow card) 45+1'; Schnegg (yellow card) 81'	Stadium: Stadio Atleti Azzurri d'Italia; Attendance: 14,739; Referee: Jérôme Brisard (France)

30 November 2023 5	Atalanta (Italy)	1–1	(Portugal) Sporting CP	Bergamo, Italy
18:45 CET (UTC+1)	Scamacca 23'; Lookman (yellow card) 39'; Scalvini (yellow card) 42'; Kolašinac (yellow card) 43'; De Roon (yellow card) 62'	Report	Inácio (yellow card) 11'; Edwards 56'; Morita (yellow card) 90+1'; Matheus Reis (yellow card) 90+4'	Stadium: Stadio Atleti Azzurri d'Italia; Attendance: 14,865; Referee: Michael Oliver (England)

14 December 2023 6	Raków Częstochowa (Poland)	0–4	(Italy) Atalanta	Sosnowiec, Poland
21:00 CET (UTC+1)	Tudor (yellow card) 76'	Report	Muriel 14', 72'; Bonfanti 26', (yellow card) 79'; Holm (yellow card) 33'; De Ketelaere 90+2'	Stadium: Zagłębiowski Park Sportowy; Attendance: 10,386; Referee: Enea Jorgji (Albania)

==== Knockout phase ====
===== Round of 16 =====
The draw for the round of 16 was held on 23 February 2024.

6 March 2024 First leg	Sporting CP (Portugal)	1–1	(Italy) Atalanta	Lisbon, Portugal
17:45 WET (UTC±0)	Paulinho 17'; Edwards (yellow card) 36'	Report	Hien (yellow card) 14'; Scamacca 39'; Scalvini (yellow card) 49'; Djimsiti (yellow card) 56'	Stadium: Estádio José Alvalade; Attendance: 28,528; Referee: Daniel Siebert (Germany)

14 March 2024 Second leg	Atalanta (Italy)	2–1 (3–2 agg.)	(Portugal) Sporting CP	Bergamo, Italy
21:00 CET (UTC+1)	Lookman 46'; Scamacca 59'; Holm (yellow card) 78'	Report	Gonçalves 33'	Stadium: Stadio Atleti Azzurri d'Italia; Attendance: 14,649; Referee: Sandro Schärer (Switzerland)

===== Quarter-finals =====
The draw for the quarter-finals was held on 15 March 2024.

11 April 2024 First leg	Liverpool (England)	0–3	(Italy) Atalanta	Liverpool, England
20:00 BST (UTC+1)		Report	Hien (yellow card) 25'; Scamacca 38', 60'; Ruggeri (yellow card) 77'; Pašalić 83'	Stadium: Anfield; Attendance: 59,004; Referee: Halil Umut Meler (Turkey)

18 April 2024 Second leg	Atalanta (Italy)	0–1 (3–1 agg.)	(England) Liverpool	Bergamo, Italy
21:00 CEST (UTC+2)	Hien (yellow card) 43'; Koopmeiners (yellow card) 77'; Zappacosta (yellow card) 90+1'	Report	Salah 7' (pen.)	Stadium: Stadio Atleti Azzurri d'Italia; Attendance: 14,994; Referee: François Letexier (France)

===== Semi-finals =====
The draw for the semi-finals was held on 15 March 2024, after the draw for the quarter-finals.

2 May 2024 First leg	Marseille (France)	1–1	(Italy) Atalanta	Marseille, France
21:00 CEST (UTC+2)	Mbemba 20'; Balerdi (yellow card) 69'	Report	Scamacca 11'	Stadium: Stade Vélodrome; Attendance: 64,475; Referee: Daniel Siebert (Germany)

9 May 2024 Second leg	Atalanta (Italy)	3–0 (4–1 agg.)	(France) Marseille	Bergamo, Italy
21:00 CEST (UTC+2)	Lookman 30'; Éderson (yellow card) 47'; Ruggeri 52'; De Roon (yellow card) 63'; Touré 90+5'	Report		Stadium: Stadio Atleti Azzurri d'Italia; Attendance: 14,994; Referee: Jesús Gil Manzano (Spain)

===== Final =====
22 May 2024 Final	Atalanta (Italy)	3–0	(Germany) Bayer Leverkusen	Dublin, Ireland
20:00 BST (UTC+1)	Lookman 12', 26', 75'; Djimsiti (yellow card) 22'; Scamacca (yellow card) 35'; Zappacosta (yellow card) 60'; Koopmeiners (yellow card) 70'	Report	Wirtz (yellow card) 35'; Tapsoba (yellow card) 67'; Andrich (yellow card) 73'	Stadium: Aviva Stadium; Attendance: 47,135; Referee: István Kovács (Romania)

== Statistics ==
=== Appearances and goals ===
No.	Pos	Nat	Player	Total		Serie A		Coppa Italia		Europa League	
No.	Pos	Nat	Player	Apps	Goals	Apps	Goals	Apps	Goals	Apps	Goals
Goalkeepers
1	GK	(Argentina) ARG	Juan Musso	24	0	11	0	1	0	12	0
29	GK	(Italy) ITA	Marco Carnesecchi	32	0	27	0	4	0	1	0
31	GK	(Italy) ITA	Francesco Rossi	2	0	0+1	0	0	0	0+1	0
Defenders
2	DF	(Italy) ITA	Rafael Tolói	24	0	10+8	0	0+1	0	3+2	0
3	DF	(Sweden) SWE	Emil Holm	32	1	12+10	1	3	0	3+4	0
4	DF	(Sweden) SWE	Isak Hien	26	0	9+7	0	3+1	0	6	0
6	DF	(Argentina) ARG	José Luis Palomino	6	0	0+4	0	0+1	0	0+1	0
19	DF	(Albania) ALB	Berat Djimsiti	54	1	32+5	0	5	0	12	1
20	DF	(Netherlands) NED	Mitchel Bakker	20	1	3+11	1	0+1	0	2+3	0
22	DF	(Italy) ITA	Matteo Ruggeri	48	2	28+6	0	4	0	10	2
23	DF	(Bosnia and Herzegovina) BIH	Sead Kolašinac	43	1	25+5	1	4	0	9	0
33	DF	(Netherlands) NED	Hans Hateboer	32	0	10+13	0	0+2	0	2+5	0
42	DF	(Italy) ITA	Giorgio Scalvini	44	2	31+2	1	2+1	0	4+4	1
43	DF	(Italy) ITA	Giovanni Bonfanti	3	1	1+1	0	0	0	1	1
45	DF	(Italy) ITA	Marco Palestra	2	0	0	0	0	0	0+2	0
46	DF	(Italy) ITA	Tommaso Del Lungo	2	0	0	0	0	0	2	0
77	DF	(Italy) ITA	Davide Zappacosta	46	2	23+8	2	3+1	0	9+2	0
Midfielders
7	MF	(Netherlands) NED	Teun Koopmeiners	51	15	29+5	12	4+1	3	10+2	0
8	MF	(Croatia) CRO	Mario Pašalić	50	8	23+11	6	3+2	1	2+9	1
13	MF	(Brazil) BRA	Éderson	53	7	32+4	6	4+1	0	11+1	1
15	MF	(Netherlands) NED	Marten de Roon	46	0	29+1	0	5	0	11	0
17	MF	(Belgium) BEL	Charles De Ketelaere	50	14	25+10	10	4	2	7+4	2
25	MF	(France) FRA	Michel Ndary Adopo	11	0	0+10	0	0	0	1	0
44	MF	(Italy) ITA	Leonardo Mendicino	2	0	0+1	0	0	0	0+1	0
59	MF	(Russia) RUS	Aleksei Miranchuk	42	4	12+15	3	3+2	1	4+6	0
Forwards
10	FW	(Mali) MLI	El Bilal Touré	17	3	3+8	2	0+2	0	0+4	1
11	FW	(Nigeria) NGR	Ademola Lookman	45	17	22+9	11	2+1	1	9+2	5
52	FW	(Italy) ITA	Tommaso De Nipoti	1	0	0	0	0	0	0+1	0
90	FW	(Italy) ITA	Gianluca Scamacca	44	19	17+12	12	1+3	1	9+2	6
99	FW	(Guinea) GUI	Moustapha Cissé	1	0	0	0	0	0	0+1	0
Players transferred out during the season
5	DF	(Italy) ITA	Caleb Okoli	0	0	0	0	0	0	0	0
9	FW	(Colombia) COL	Luis Muriel	25	6	2+16	2	0+2	0	3+2	4
21	DF	(Italy) ITA	Nadir Zortea	7	1	0+5	1	0+1	0	1	0
91	FW	(Colombia) COL	Duván Zapata	2	1	2	1	0	0	0	0
93	DF	(France) FRA	Brandon Soppy	0	0	0	0	0	0	0	0
97	FW	(Italy) ITA	Nicolò Cambiaghi	0	0	0	0	0	0	0	0

Source: Competitions

=== Goalscorers ===
Rank	No.	Pos.	Nat.	Player	Serie A	Coppa Italia	Europa League	Total
1	90	FW	(Italy)	Gianluca Scamacca	12	1	6	19
2	11	FW	(Nigeria)	Ademola Lookman	11	1	5	17
3	7	MF	(Netherlands)	Teun Koopmeiners	12	3	0	15
4	17	MF	(Belgium)	Charles De Ketelaere	10	2	2	14
5	8	MF	(Croatia)	Mario Pašalić	6	1	1	8
6	13	MF	(Brazil)	Éderson	6	0	1	7
7	9	FW	(Colombia)	Luis Muriel	2	0	4	6
8	59	MF	(Russia)	Aleksei Miranchuk	3	1	0	4
9	10	FW	(Mali)	El Bilal Touré	2	0	1	3
10	22	DF	(Italy)	Matteo Ruggeri	0	0	2	2
10	42	DF	(Italy)	Giorgio Scalvini	1	0	1	2
10	77	DF	(Italy)	Davide Zappacosta	2	0	0	2
13	3	DF	(Sweden)	Emil Holm	1	0	0	1
13	19	DF	(Albania)	Berat Djimsiti	0	0	1	1
13	20	DF	(Netherlands)	Mitchel Bakker	1	0	0	1
13	21	DF	(Italy)	Nadir Zortea	1	0	0	1
13	23	DF	(Bosnia and Herzegovina)	Sead Kolašinac	1	0	0	1
13	43	DF	(Italy)	Giovanni Bonfanti	0	0	1	1
13	91	FW	(Colombia)	Duván Zapata	1	0	0	1
Totals					72	9	25	106
