= 2024 Coppa Italia final =

76th Coppa Italia final
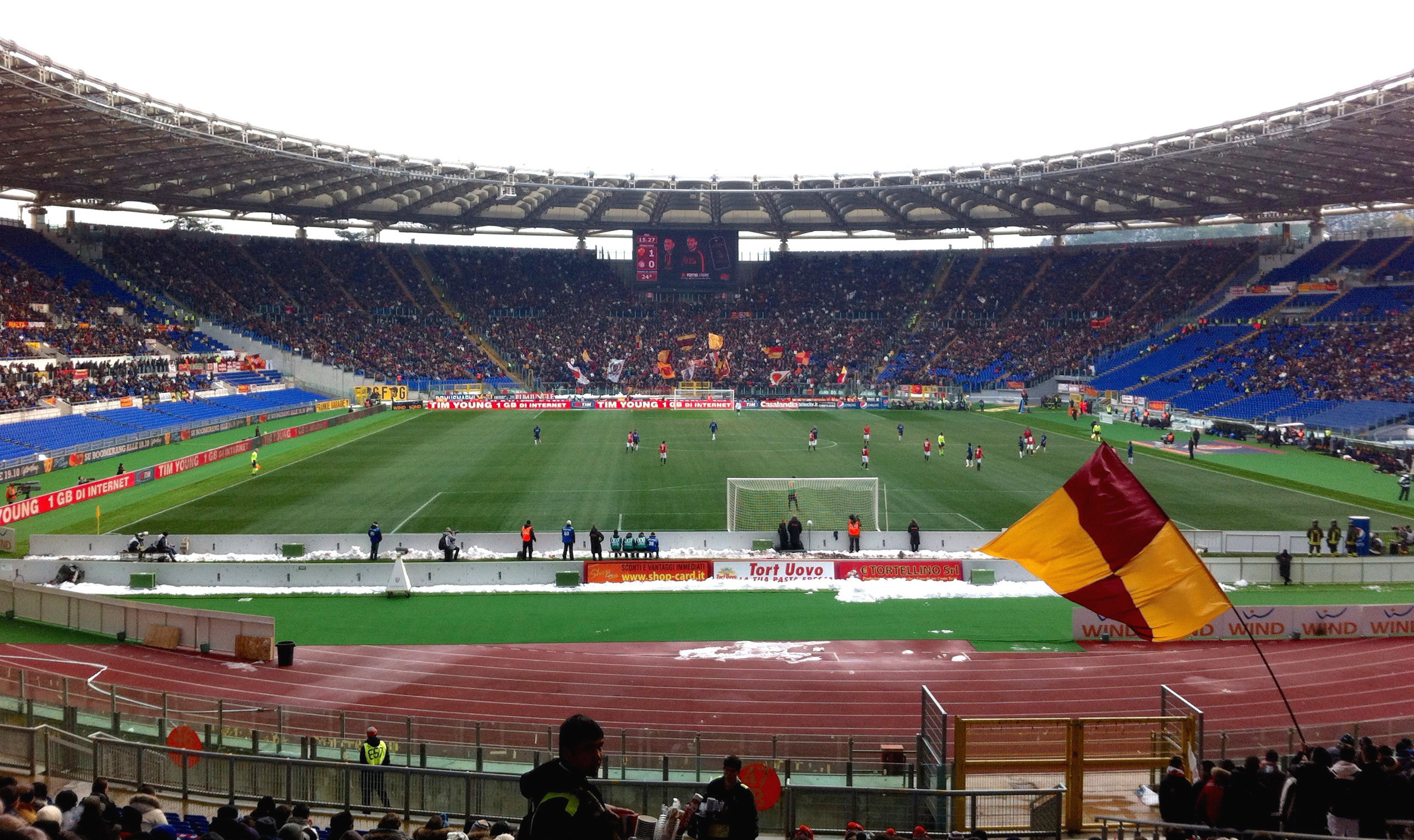
- The Stadio Olimpico in Rome hosted the final
- Event: 2023–24 Coppa Italia
Atalanta	Juventus
0	1
- Date: 15 May 2024
- Venue: Stadio Olimpico, Rome
- Man of the Match: Dušan Vlahović (Juventus)
- Referee: Fabio Maresca
- Attendance: 66,854

The 2024 Coppa Italia final was the final match of the 2023–24 edition of the Coppa Italia, Italy's premier national football cup. It was played on 15 May 2024 between Atalanta and Juventus.

Juventus won the match 1–0 for a record-extending 15th Coppa Italia title.

== Background ==
Atalanta had previously played in five Coppa Italia finals, winning once. Their most recent final appearance was in 2021 a 2–1 defeat to Juventus; their only win was in 1963, a 3–1 victory over Torino, which was also their most recent major title. Juventus had won 14 of their 21 appearances in the cup final. Their most recent appearance was a 4–2 extra time loss to Internazionale in 2022. The two teams had last met in the Coppa Italia final in 2021, where Juventus won 2–1. That was also Juventus' most recent win in the cup.

This win marked the last trophy of the Massimiliano Allegri managerial era in Juventus, as he got sacked two days later, on 17 May 2024.

In reaching the final, both teams qualified for the 2024–25 Supercoppa Italiana (for the first time in Atalanta's case).

== Road to the final ==
Note: In all results below, the score of the finalist is given first (H: home; A: away).

Atalanta		Round	Juventus
Opponent	Result	2023–24 Coppa Italia	Opponent	Result
Sassuolo	3–1	Round of 16	Salernitana	6–1
Milan	2–1	Quarter-finals	Frosinone	4–0
Fiorentina	0–1 (A), 4–1 (H); 4–2 agg.	Semi-finals	Lazio	2–0 (H), 1–2 (A); 3–2 agg.

== Match ==
=== Summary ===
The game started in front of 66,854 people. In the fourth minute, Andrea Cambiaso sent an elevated through ball to Dušan Vlahović, who ran into the box and scored a goal past Marco Carnesecchi from around the penalty spot. In the eighth minute, Hans Nicolussi Caviglia sent a corner into the box which Weston McKennie headed into Federico Gatti, who headed over the crossbar. In the seventeenth minute, Isak Hien was shown a yellow card for knocking down Federico Chiesa. In the forty-fifth minute, Mario Pašalić sent in a ball from just inside the box from a build-up from a corner, which hit McKennie on its way before Gatti deflected the shot.

At halftime, Charles De Ketelaere was taken off in replacement for El Bilal Touré. In the fifty-fifth minute, Vlahović had a clear run to the goal but was taken down by Hien on the byline. No penalty was called by the referee, but after dissent, Vlahović was shown a yellow card. In the fifty-ninth minute, Atalanta made a triple sub, putting on Hans Hateboer, Giorgio Scalvini and Aleksei Miranchuk for Hien, Mario Pašalić and Davide Zappacosta. Three minutes later, Juventus brought on Fabio Miretti for Nicolussi Caviglia. Shortly after, they made a sub for Chiesa, bringing on young talent Kenan Yıldız. In the seventy-second minute, Cambiaso sendt in a cross to Vlahović from outside the box, where he headed it in for a goal. However, after a VAR check, Vlahović was identified as offside. After six minutes of injury time and a red card shown to coach Massimiliano Allegri, the game was finished as Juventus won their record extending 15th Coppa Italia.

=== Details ===
15 May 2024
21:00 CEST

Atalanta	0–1	Juventus
	Report	Vlahović 4'

Stadio Olimpico, Rome
Attendance: 66,854
Referee: Fabio Maresca

Atalanta	Juventus

GK	29	(Italy) Marco Carnesecchi
CB	15	(Netherlands) Marten de Roon (c)		(substituted off) 65'
CB	4	(Sweden) Isak Hien	(yellow card) 17'	(substituted off) 59'
CB	19	(Albania) Berat Djimsiti	(yellow card) 78'
RM	77	(Italy) Davide Zappacosta		(substituted off) 59'
CM	8	(Croatia) Mario Pašalić		(substituted off) 59'
CM	13	(Brazil) Éderson
LM	22	(Italy) Matteo Ruggeri
RW	7	(Netherlands) Teun Koopmeiners
LW	11	(Nigeria) Ademola Lookman
CF	17	(Belgium) Charles De Ketelaere		(substituted off) 46'
Substitutes:
GK	1	(Argentina) Juan Musso
GK	31	(Italy) Francesco Rossi
DF	2	(Italy) Rafael Tolói	(yellow card) 90+6'	(substituted on) 65'
DF	20	(Netherlands) Mitchel Bakker
DF	33	(Netherlands) Hans Hateboer		(substituted on) 59'
DF	42	(Italy) Giorgio Scalvini		(substituted on) 59'
DF	43	(Italy) Giovanni Bonfanti
MF	25	(France) Michel Ndary Adopo
MF	59	(Russia) Aleksei Miranchuk		(substituted on) 59'
FW	10	(Mali) El Bilal Touré		(substituted on) 46'
Manager:
(Italy) Gian Piero Gasperini

GK	36	(Italy) Mattia Perin
CB	4	(Italy) Federico Gatti
CB	3	(Brazil) Bremer	(yellow card) 90+1'
CB	6	(Brazil) Danilo (c)
DM	41	(Italy) Hans Nicolussi Caviglia		(substituted off) 62'
RW	27	(Italy) Andrea Cambiaso		(substituted off) 81'
CM	25	(France) Adrien Rabiot
CM	16	(United States) Weston McKennie
LW	17	(England) Samuel Iling-Junior
CF	9	(Serbia) Dušan Vlahović	(yellow card) 56'	(substituted off) 81'
CF	7	(Italy) Federico Chiesa		(substituted off) 69'
Substitutes:
GK	1	(Poland) Wojciech Szczęsny
GK	23	(Italy) Carlo Pinsoglio
DF	12	(Brazil) Alex Sandro
DF	24	(Italy) Daniele Rugani
DF	33	(Portugal) Tiago Djaló
MF	11	(Serbia) Filip Kostić
MF	20	(Italy) Fabio Miretti		(substituted on) 62'
MF	22	(United States) Timothy Weah		(substituted on) 81'
MF	26	(Argentina) Carlos Alcaraz
FW	14	(Poland) Arkadiusz Milik		(substituted on) 81'
FW	15	(Turkey) Kenan Yıldız		(substituted on) 69'
FW	18	(Italy) Moise Kean
Manager:
(Italy) Massimiliano Allegri			(red card) 90+5'

Man of the Match:
Dušan Vlahović (Juventus)

Assistant referees:
Daniele Bindoni
Alberto Tegoni
Fourth official:
Maurizio Mariani
Reserve assistant referee:
Stefano Liberti
Video assistant referee:
Valerio Marini
Assistant video assistant referee:
Aleandro Di Paolo

Match rules

- 90 minutes.
- 30 minutes of extra time if necessary.
- Penalty shoot-out if scores still level.
- Fifteen named substitutes.
- Maximum of five substitutions, with a sixth allowed in extra time. (Note: Each team was given only three opportunities to make substitutions, excluding substitutions made at half-time, before the start of extra time and at half-time in extra time.)

== See also ==
- 2023–24 Atalanta BC season
- 2023–24 Juventus FC season
