= 2024–25 Cagliari Calcio season =

Cagliari Calcio
2024–25 season
- President: Tommaso Giulini
- Head Coach: Davide Nicola
- Stadium: Unipol Domus
- Serie A: 15th
- Coppa Italia: Round of 16
- Top goalscorer: League: Roberto Piccoli (10); All: Roberto Piccoli (12)
- Highest home attendance: 16,412 vs Inter Milan (28 December 2024, Serie A); 16,412 vs Juventus (23 February 2025, Serie A)
- Lowest home attendance: 11,017 vs Cremonese (24 September 2024, Coppa Italia)
- Average home league attendance: 15,745
- Biggest win: 4–1 vs Lecce (H) (19 January 2025, Serie A)
- Biggest defeat: 0–4 vs Napoli (H) (15 September 2024, Serie A); 4–0 vs Juventus (A) (17 December 2024, Coppa Italia)
Home colours	Away colours	Third colours

The 2024–25 season was the 105th season in the history of the Cagliari Calcio, and it was their second consecutive season in Serie A. The team played both in the domestic league and the Coppa Italia.

On 5 July 2024, Davide Nicola was announced as the team's coach.

== Squad ==
As of 4 February 2025

Note: Flags indicate national team as defined under FIFA eligibility rules; some limited exceptions apply. Players may hold more than one non-FIFA nationality.

No.	Pos.	Nation	Player
1	GK	ITA	Giuseppe Ciocci
3	DF	ITA	Tommaso Augello
6	DF	ITA	Sebastiano Luperto
8	MF	FRA	Michel Adopo (on loan from Atalanta)
9	FW	ROU	Florinel Coman (on loan from Al-Gharafa)
10	MF	ITA	Nicolas Viola
14	MF	ITA	Alessandro Deiola (vice-captain)
16	MF	ITA	Matteo Prati
18	MF	ROU	Răzvan Marin
19	MF	ITA	Nadir Zortea
21	MF	CZE	Jakub Jankto
24	DF	ARG	José Luis Palomino

No.	Pos.	Nation	Player
25	GK	ITA	Elia Caprile (on loan from Napoli)
26	DF	COL	Yerry Mina
28	DF	ITA	Gabriele Zappa
29	MF	CGO	Antoine Makoumbou
30	FW	ITA	Leonardo Pavoletti (captain)
33	DF	SVK	Adam Obert
70	MF	ITA	Gianluca Gaetano (on loan from Napoli)
71	GK	ALB	Alen Sherri
77	FW	ANG	Zito Luvumbo
80	FW	ZAM	Kingstone Mutandwa
91	FW	ITA	Roberto Piccoli (on loan from Atalanta)
97	FW	ITA	Mattia Felici

== Transfers ==
=== Summer window ===
==== In ====
Date	Pos.	Player	From	Fee	Notes	Ref.
30 June 2024	MF	(Romania) Răzvan Marin	(Italy) Empoli	Free	End of loan	
30 June 2024	GK	(Italy) Giuseppe Ciocci	(Italy) Pontedera	Free	End of loan	
8 July 2024	DF	(Italy) Sebastiano Luperto	(Italy) Empoli	€3,500,000		
10 July 2024	MF	(Italy) Mattia Felici	(Italy) Feralpisalò	€2,000,000		
17 July 2024	DF	(Italy) Nadir Zortea	(Italy) Atalanta	€5,000,000		
24 July 2024	GK	(Albania) Alen Sherri	(Albania) Egnatia	€300,000		
13 August 2024	DF	(Argentina) José Luis Palomino	(Italy) Atalanta	Free		

==== Loans in ====
Date	Pos.	Player	From	Fee	Notes	Ref.
17 July 2024	MF	(France) Michel Adopo	(Italy) Atalanta	Free	Option to buy for €4,000,000	
17 July 2024	FW	(Italy) Roberto Piccoli	(Italy) Atalanta	€500,000	Option to buy for €11,600,000	
30 August 2024	MF	(Italy) Gianluca Gaetano	(Italy) Napoli	Free	Option to buy for €12,000,000	

==== Out ====
Date	Pos.	Player	To	Fee	Notes	Ref.
30 June 2024	GK	(Italy) Simone Aresti	Retired			
30 June 2024	MF	(Italy) Marco Mancosu	Retired			
30 June 2024	MF	(Italy) Gianluca Gaetano	(Italy) Napoli	Loan return		
30 June 2024	MF	(Uruguay) Nahitan Nández	(Saudi Arabia) Al Qadsiah	Free	End of contract	
30 June 2024	MF	(Italy) Gaetano Oristanio	(Italy) Inter Milan	Loan return		
30 June 2024	FW	(Italy) Andrea Petagna	(Italy) Monza	Loan return		
30 June 2024	FW	(Uzbekistan) Eldor Shomurodov	(Italy) Roma	Loan return		
1 July 2024	DF	(Italy) Giorgio Altare	(Italy) Venezia	€1,000,000		
1 July 2024	FW	(Italy) Jacopo Desogus	(Italy) Cittadella	Undisclosed		
1 July 2024	DF	(Italy) Alberto Dossena	(Italy) Como	€8,000,000		
12 July 2024	DF	(Italy) Christian Travaglini	(Italy) Pro Patria	Undisclosed		
17 July 2024	FW	(Italy) Gianluca Contini	(Italy) Virtus Verona	Free		
17 July 2024	MF	(Ghana) Ibrahim Sulemana	(Italy) Atalanta	€7,500,000		
1 August 2024	MF	(Greece) Christos Kourfalidis	(Italy) Cosenza	€250,000		
4 August 2024	DF	(Italy) Salvatore Boccia	(Italy) Arzignano Valchiampo	Undisclosed		
9 August 2024	MF	(Argentina) Isaías Delpupo	(Belgium) Sint-Truiden	Undisclosed		
27 August 2024	DF	(Italy) Francesco Zallu	(Italy) Gubbio	Free		
29 August 2024	MF	(Uruguay) Gastón Pereiro	(Italy) Genoa	Free	Contract solved by mutual consent	

==== Loans out ====
Date	Pos.	Player	To	Fee	Notes	Ref.
8 July 2024	DF	(Italy) Luigi Palomba	(Italy) Vis Pesaro	Free		
10 July 2024	MF	(Italy) Nicolò Cavuoti	(Italy) Feralpisalò	Free		
12 July 2024	FW	(Slovenia) Nik Prelec	Austria Wien	Free	Option to buy for an undisclosed fee	
1 August 2024	GK	(Serbia) Boris Radunović	(Italy) Bari	Free		
22 August 2024	DF	(Italy) Alessandro Di Pardo	(Italy) Modena	Free	Option to buy for €1,000,000 obligation to buy under certain conditions	
2 September 2024	DF	(Greece) Pantelis Hatzidiakos	(Denmark) Copenhagen	Free	Option to buy for an undisclosed fee	

=== Winter window ===
==== In ====
Date	Pos.	Player	From	Fee	Notes	Ref.

==== Loans In ====
Date	Pos.	Player	From	Fee	Notes	Ref.
7 January 2025	GK	(Italy) Elia Caprile	(Italy) Napoli	Free	Option to buy for €8,000,000	
3 February 2025	FW	(Romania) Florinel Coman	(Qatar) Al-Gharafa	Free	Option to buy for €8,000,000	

==== Out ====
Date	Pos.	Player	To	Fee	Notes	Ref.
22 January 2025	DF	(Brazil) Paulo Azzi	(Italy) Cremonese	Undisclosed		
31 January 2025	FW	(Peru) Gianluca Lapadula	(Italy) Spezia	Free		

==== Loans out ====
Date	Pos.	Player	To	Fee	Notes	Ref.
7 January 2025	GK	(Italy) Simone Scuffet	(Italy) Napoli	Free		
22 January 2025	DF	(Poland) Mateusz Wieteska	(Greece) PAOK	€150,000	Option to buy for €2,500,000	

== Friendlies ==
25 July 2024 Friendly	Cagliari (Italy)	1–3	(Italy) Como	Chatillon
17:00				Stadium: Campo Sportivo E. Brunod

30 July 2024 Friendly	Cagliari (Italy)	2–0	(Italy) Catanzaro	Saint-Vincent
19:00				Stadium: Stadio Sportivo Comunale Piergiorgio Perucca

3 August 2024 Friendly	Modena FC (Italy)	2–2	(Italy) Cagliari	Modena
17:00				Stadium: Stadio Alberto Braglia

14 November 2024 Friendly	Cagliari (Italy)	8–0	(Italy) CUS Cagliari	Sa Duchessa
15:00

== Competitions ==
=== Overall record ===
Competition	First match	Last match	Starting round	Record							
Competition	First match	Last match	Starting round	Pld	W	D	L	GF	GA	GD	Win %
Serie A	18 August 2024	24–25 May 2025	Matchday 1	31	7	9	15	31	44	−13	22.58
Coppa Italia	12 August 2024			3	2	0	1	4	5	−1	66.67
Total				34	9	9	16	35	49	−14	26.47

Last updated: 8 April 2025
Source: Soccerway

=== Serie A ===
==== League table ====
Pos	Team	Pld	W	D	L	GF	GA	GD	Pts
13	Genoa	38	10	13	15	37	49	−12	43
14	Hellas Verona	38	10	7	21	34	66	−32	37
15	Cagliari	38	9	9	20	40	56	−16	36 (Note: Cagliari finished ahead of Parma on head-to-head points: Parma 2–3 Cagliari, Cagliari 2–1 Parma.)
16	Parma	38	7	15	16	44	58	−14	36
17	Lecce	38	8	10	20	27	58	−31	34

Source: Serie A
Rules for classification: 1) Points; 2) Tiebreaker for Champions team and third relegated team; 3) Head-to-head points; 4) Head-to-head goal difference; 5) Goal difference; 6) Goals scored; 7) Draw.
(Note: Head-to-head record is used only after all the matches between the teams in question have been played)

==== Results summary ====
Overall								Home						Away					
Pld	W	D	L	GF	GA	GD	Pts	W	D	L	GF	GA	GD	W	D	L	GF	GA	GD
31	7	9	15	31	44	−13	30	5	4	7	19	24	−5	2	5	8	12	20	−8

Last updated: 8. April 2025.
Source: Worldfootball

==== Results by round ====
Round	1	2	3	4	5	6	7	8	9	10	11	12	13	14	15	16	17	18	19	20	21	22	23	24	25	26	27	28	29	30	31	32	33
Ground	H	H	A	H	H	A	A	H	A	H	A	H	A	H	A	H	A	H	A	A	H	A	H	H	A	H	A	H	A	H	A	H	
Result	D	D	L	L	L	W	D	W	L	L	L	D	D	W	L	L	L	L	W	D	W	L	L	W	D	L	L	D	L	W	D		
Position	15	13	15	19	20	16	15	14	14	14	14	16	16	13	15	18	18	18	18	18	14	15	17	13	14	15	15	14	15	15	15		

Updated to match(es) played on 8 April 2025. Source: Worldfootball
A = Away; H = Home; W = Win; D = Draw; L = Loss

==== Matches ====
The match schedule was released on 4 July 2024.

18 August 2024 1	Cagliari	0–0	Roma	Cagliari
20:45		Report		Stadium: Unipol Domus; Attendance: 16,261; Referee: Livio Marinelli

26 August 2024 2	Cagliari	1–1	Como	Cagliari
18:30	Piccoli 44'	Report	Cutrone 53'	Stadium: Unipol Domus; Attendance: 16,365; Referee: Marco Di Bello

31 August 2024 3	Lecce	1–0	Cagliari	Lecce
18:30	Krstović 26'	Report		Stadium: Stadio Via del mare Referee: Michael Fabbri

15 September 2024 4	Cagliari	0–4	Napoli	Cagliari
18:00		Report	Di Lorenzo 18'; Kvaratskhelia 66'; Lukaku 70'; Buongiorno 90+3'	Stadium: Unipol Domus; Attendance: 15,733; Referee: Federico La Penna

20 September 2024 5	Cagliari	0–2	Empoli	Cagliari
18:30		Report		Stadium: Unipol Domus

30 September 2024 6	Parma	2–3	Cagliari	Parma
20:45	Man 62'; Hernani 87'	Report	Zortea 34'; Marin 75'; Piccoli 87'	Stadium: Stadio Ennio Tardini; Referee: Francesco Fourneau

6 October 2024 7	Juventus	1–1	Cagliari	Turin
12:30	Vlahović 15' (pen.); Thuram (yellow card) 33'; Savona (yellow card) 56'; Conceição (yellow card) 75' (yellow-red card) 89'; Cambiaso (yellow card) 84'	Report	Marin 88' (pen.); Mina (yellow card) 88'; Deiola (yellow card) 90+6'	Stadium: Juventus Stadium; Attendance: 40,557; Referee: Livio Marinelli

20 October 2024 8	Cagliari	3–2	Torino	Cagliari
18:00	Viola 38'; Adopo (yellow card) 60'; Palomino 74'; Coco 78' (o.g.)	Report	Coco (yellow card) 14'; Sanabria 41'; Lazaro (yellow card) 45+2'; Masina (yellow card) 54'; Linetty 55'	Stadium: Unipol Domus; Referee: Gianluca Aureliano

25 October 2024 9	Udinese	2–0	Cagliari	Udine
18:30	Lucca 38', (yellow card) 64'; Davis 78'; Touré (yellow card) 81'	Report	Makoumbou (yellow card) 5' (yellow-red card) 29'; Azzi (yellow card) 80'	Stadium: Stadio Friuli; Referee: Gianluca Manganiello

29 October 2024 10	Cagliari	0–2	Bologna	Cagliari
18:30	Palomino (yellow card) 39'; Zappa (yellow card) 75'	Report	Orsolini 35'; Odgaard 51'; Pobega (yellow card) 71'; Fabbian (yellow card) 88'	Stadium: Unipol Domus; Attendance: 15,977; Referee: Francesco Fourneau

4 November 2024 11	Lazio	2–1	Cagliari	Rome
20:45 CET (UTC+1)	Dia 2'; Noslin (yellow card) 25'; Lazzari (yellow card) 61'; Zaccagni 76' (pen.); Rovella (yellow card) 85'	Report	Adopo (yellow card) 9' (yellow-red card) 78'; Augello (yellow card) 17'; Mina (yellow card) 29' (yellow-red card) 78'; Luvumbo 41', (yellow card) 64'; Zappa (yellow card) 49'; Luperto (yellow card) 74'	Stadium: Stadio Olimpico; Attendance: 36,000; Referee: Giovanni Ayroldi

9 November 2024 12	Cagliari	3–3	Milan	Cagliari
18:00 CET (UTC+1)	Zortea 2'; Zappa 53', 89'	Report	Leão 15', 40'; Fofana (yellow card) 61'; Abraham 69'; Hernandez (yellow card) 90+1'	Stadium: Unipol Domus; Attendance: 16,271; Referee: Michael Fabbri

24 November 2024 13	Genoa	2–2	Cagliari	Genoa
12:30	Frendrup 12'; Miretti 59'; Martín (yellow card) 79'; Bani (yellow card) 86'	Report	Marin 8', (yellow card) 66'; Piccoli 88' (pen.); Viola (yellow card) 90+4'	Stadium: Stadio Luigi Ferraris; Referee: Simone Sozza

29 October 2024 14	Cagliari	1–0	Hellas Verona	Cagliari
20:45 CEST (UTC+2)	Marin (yellow card) 27'; Piccoli 75'	Report	Coppola (yellow card) 81'; Lambourde (yellow card) 89'	Stadium: Unipol Domus; Attendance: 16.162; Referee: Maurizio Mariani

8 December 2024 15	Fiorentina	1–0	Cagliari	Florence
12:30 CET (UTC+1)	Cataldi 24'; Comuzzo (yellow card) 30'; Dodô (yellow card) 58'; Gosens (yellow card) 75'	Report	Mina (yellow card) 35'; Luvumbo (yellow card) 88'	Stadium: Stadio Artemio Franchi; Attendance: 19,851; Referee: Marco Piccinini

14 December 2024 16	Cagliari	0–1	Atalanta	Cagliari
15:00 CET (UTC+1)	Luperto (yellow card) 43'; Augello (yellow card) 52'; Obert (yellow card) 86'	Report	De Roon (yellow card) 49'; Zaniolo 66', (yellow card) 66'; Samardžić (yellow card) 90+1'	Stadium: Unipol Domus; Attendance: 15,985; Referee: Luca Pairetto

22 December 2024 17	Venezia	2–1	Cagliari	Venice
15:00 CET (UTC+1)	Zampano 38'; Šverko 67'; Idzes (yellow card) 82'	Report	Wieteska (yellow card) 73'; Pavoletti 76', (yellow card) 82'	Stadium: Stadio Pier Luigi Penzo; Referee: Marco Guida

28 December 2024 18	Cagliari	0–3	Internazionale	Cagliari
18:00 CET (UTC+1)		Report	Bastoni 53'; L. Martínez 71'; Çalhanoğlu 78' (pen.)	Stadium: Unipol Domus; Attendance: 16,412; Referee: Daniele Doveri

5 January 2025 19	Monza	1–2	Cagliari	Monza
12:30 CET (UTC+1)	Caprari 6' (pen.); Bondo (yellow card) 30'; D'Ambrosio (red card) 63'; Bianco (yellow card) 88'	Report	Zortea 22'; Piccoli (yellow card) 45', (goal) 56'; Mina (yellow card) 67'	Stadium: Stadio Brianteo; Referee: Marco Di Bello

11 January 2025 20	Milan	1–1	Cagliari	Milan
20:45	Morata 51'; Jiménez (yellow card) 82'	Report	Felici (yellow card) 41'; Zortea 55'; Piccoli (yellow card) 90+1'	Stadium: Giuseppe Meazza; Attendance: 69.263; Referee: Francesco Fourneau

19 January 2025 21	Cagliari	4–1	Lecce	Cagliari
15:00	Adopo (yellow card) 52'; Gaetano 60'; Luperto 65'; Zortea 80', (yellow card) 81'; Obert 83'; Deiola (yellow card) 90+1'	Report	Pierotti 42', (yellow card) 45'; Rebić (red card) 73'	Stadium: Unipol Domus; Attendance: 16.306; Referee: Juan Luca Sacchi

24 January 2025 22	Torino	2–0	Cagliari	Turin
20:45 CET (UTC+1)	Adams 6', 61'	Report	Zortea (yellow card) 52'	Stadium: Stadio Olimpico Grande Torino; Attendance: 18.992; Referee: Kevin Bonacina

3 February 2025 23	Cagliari	1–2	Lazio	Cagliari
20:45 CET (UTC+1)	Piccoli 55'	Report	Zaccagni 41'; Castellanos 64'	Stadium: Unipol Domus; Attendance: 15,751; Referee: Gianluca Manganiello

9 February 2025 24	Cagliari	2–1	Parma	Cagliari
15:00 CET (UTC+1)	Vogliacco 57' (o.g.); Coman 70'	Report	Camara (yellow card) 55'; Leoni (yellow card) 78'; Hernani (yellow card) 90+1'	Stadium: Stadio Unipol Domus; Attendance: 16,154; Referee: Marco Di Bello

15 February 2025 25	Atalanta	0–0	Cagliari	Bergamo
15:00 CET (UTC+1)	Hien (yellow card) 90+5'	Report	Coman (yellow card) 90+5'	Stadium: Gewiss Stadium; Attendance: 21,485; Referee: Matteo Marchetti

23 February 2025 26	Cagliari	0–1	Juventus	Cagliari
20:45 CET (UTC+1)		Report	Vlahović 12'; Weah (yellow card) 49'	Stadium: Unipol Domus; Attendance: 16,412; Referee: Andrea Colombo

2 March 2025 27	Bologna	2–1	Cagliari	Bologna
15:00 CET (UTC+1)	Orsolini 48' (pen.), 56'; Freuler (yellow card) 84'	Report	Piccoli 22'; Obert (yellow card) 29'; Makoumbou (yellow card) 77'	Stadium: Stadio Renato Dall'Ara; Attendance: 25,676; Referee: Luca Zufferli

7 March 2025 28	Cagliari	1–1	Genoa	Cagliari
20:45	Viola 18'; Deiola (yellow card) 60'; Pavoletti (yellow card) 90+1'		Cornet 47'; Badelj (yellow card) 48'; Masini (yellow card) 65'	Stadium: Unipol Domus; Attendance: 15.827; Referee: Michael Fabbri

16 March 2025 29	Roma	1–0	Cagliari	Rome
15:00 CET (UTC+1)	Dovbyk 62'	Report	Viola (yellow card) 26'; Obert (yellow card) 40'	Stadium: Stadio Olimpico; Attendance: 62,911; Referee: Marco Piccinini

30 March 2025 30	Cagliari	3–0	Monza	Cagliari
12:30 CET (UTC+1)	Luperto (yellow card) 12'; Viola 49'; Gaetano 73'; Piccoli (yellow card) 75'; Luvumbo 90+2'	Report	(yellow card) 29' Izzo; (yellow card) 67' Baldé	Stadium: Unipol Domus; Attendance: 16.319; Referee: Francesco Fourneau

6 April 2025 31	Empoli	0–0	Cagliari	Empoli
15:00 CET (UTC+1)		Report	Luperto (yellow card) 49'; Palomino (yellow card) 61'; Augello (yellow card) 86'; Pavoletti (yellow card) 88'	Stadium: Stadio Carlo Castellani; Attendance: 16.284; Referee: Federico La Penna

12 April 2025 32	Internazionale	3–1	Cagliari	Milan
18:00 CEST (UTC+2)	Arnautović 13'; L. Martínez 26'; Bisseck 55'	Report	Piccoli 48'; Deiola (yellow card) 69'	Stadium: San Siro; Attendance: 71,799; Referee: Marco Di Bello

23 April 2025 33	Cagliari	1–2	Fiorentina	Cagliari
19:05 CEST (UTC+2)	Piccoli 7'	Report	Gosens 36'; Beltrán 48'	Stadium: Sardegna Arena

28 April 2025 34	Verona	0–2	Cagliari	Verona
20:45 CEST (UTC+2)	Ghilardi (red card) 85'	Report	Pavoletti 30'; Deiola 90+3'	Stadium: Marcantonio Bentegodi Stadium

3 May 2025 35	Cagliari	1–2	Udinese	Cagliari
15:00 CEST (UTC+2)	Zortea 35'	Report	Zarraga 27'; Kristensen 67'	Stadium: Sardegna Arena

10 May 2025 36	Como	3–1	Cagliari	Como
15:00 CEST (UTC+2)	Caqueret 40'; Strefezza 45+2'; Cutrone 77'	Report	Adopo 22'	Stadium: Stadio Giuseppe Sinigaglia

18 May 2025 37	Cagliari	3–0	Venezia	Cagliari
20:45 CEST (UTC+2)	Mina 11'; Piccoli 41'; Deiola 71'	Report		Stadium: Sardegna Arena

21 May 2025 38	Napoli	2–0	Cagliari	Naples
20:00 CEST (UTC+2)	Politano (yellow card) 31'; McTominay 42'; Lukaku 51', (yellow card) 52'	Report	Makoumbou (yellow card) 31'	Stadium: Stadio Diego Armando Maradona; Referee: Federico La Penna

=== Coppa Italia ===
12 August 2024 Round of 32	Cagliari	3–1	Carrarese	Cagliari
21:15	Piccoli 33'; Deiola (yellow card) 37'; Pavoletti 41'; Prati 71'		Capezzi (yellow card) 40'; Panico 55'; Illanes (yellow card) 62'	Stadium: Unipol Domus; Attendance: 15.870; Referee: Ivano Pezzuto

24 September 2024 Second round	Cagliari	1–0	Cremonese	Cagliari
18:30	Palomino (yellow card) 41'; Lapadula 60'; Zappa (yellow card) 62'; Viola (yellow card) 73'	Report	Pickel (yellow card) 32'	Stadium: Unipol Domus; Attendance: 11.017; Referee: Kevin Bonacina

17 December 2024 Round of 16	Juventus	4–0	Cagliari	Turin
21:00 CET (UTC+1)	Vlahović 44'; Koopmeiners 53'; Conceição 80'; González 89'	Report		Stadium: Juventus Stadium; Attendance: 36,768; Referee: Ermanno Feliciani

== Statistics ==
As of match played 17 January 2026

No.	Pos.	Nat.	Player	Serie A		Coppa Italia		Total	
No.	Pos.	Nat.	Player	Apps	Goals	Apps	Goals	Apps	Goals
1	GK	(Italy)	Giuseppe Ciocci	0+1	0	0	0	0+1	0
3	DF	(Italy)	Tommaso Augello	30+8	0	3	0	33+8	0
6	DF	(Italy)	Sebastiano Luperto	36	1	1	0	37	1
8	MF	(France)	Michel Ndary Adopo	27+8	1	1+2	0	28+10	1
9	FW	(Romania)	Florinel Coman	2+7	1	0	0	2+7	1
10	MF	(Italy)	Nicolas Viola	18+9	3	0+1	0	18+10	3
14	MF	(Italy)	Alessandro Deiola	16+13	2	2+1	0	18+14	2
16	MF	(Italy)	Matteo Prati	8+4	0	1+1	1	9+5	1
18	MF	(Romania)	Răzvan Marin	13+20	3	2	0	15+20	3
19	MF	(Italy)	Nadir Zortea	33+2	6	1+1	0	34+3	6
24	DF	(Argentina)	José Luis Palomino	10+8	1	2	0	12+8	1
25	GK	(Italy)	Elia Caprile	18	0	0	0	18	0
26	DF	(Colombia)	Yerry Mina	31	1	0	0	31	1
28	DF	(Italy)	Gabriele Zappa	35+2	2	3	0	38+2	2
29	MF	(Republic of the Congo)	Antoine Makoumbou	27+6	0	1	0	28+6	0
30	FW	(Italy)	Leonardo Pavoletti	1+25	2	1+1	1	2+26	3
33	DF	(Slovakia)	Adam Obert	13+8	1	1+1	0	14+9	1
70	MF	(Italy)	Gianluca Gaetano	8+20	2	2	0	10+20	2
71	GK	(Albania)	Alen Sherri	7	0	1	0	8	0
