= Nadir Zortea =

Italian footballer (born 1999)

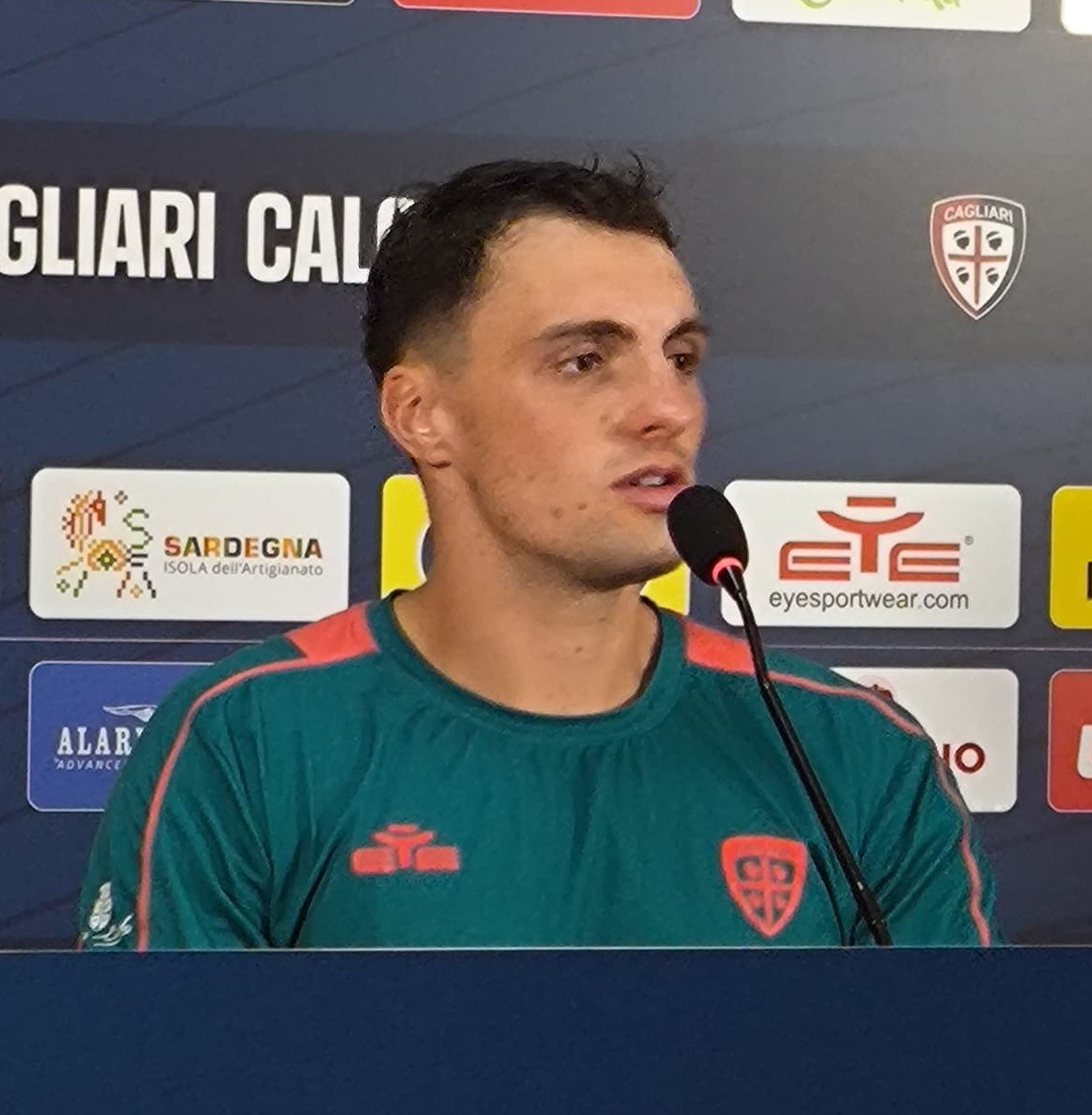
- Zortea with Cagliari in 2024

Personal information
- Date of birth: 19 June 1999 (age 27)
- Place of birth: Feltre, Italy
- Height: 1.87 m (6 ft 2 in)
- Position: Right-back

Team information
- Current team: Bologna
- Number: 20

Youth career
- –2014: Feltreseprealpi
- 2013–2014: → Südtirol (loan)
- 2014–2019: Atalanta
- 2016–2017: Vicenza

Senior career*
Years	Team	Apps	(Gls)
2019–2024	Atalanta	14	(2)
2019–2021	→ Cremonese (loan)	52	(1)
2021–2022	→ Salernitana (loan)	29	(1)
2023	→ Sassuolo (loan)	10	(0)
2024	→ Frosinone (loan)	14	(1)
2024–2025	Cagliari	35	(6)
2025–	Bologna	36	(0)
- * Club domestic league appearances and goals as of 17 October 2026 (UTC)

Nadir Zortea (born 19 June 1999) is an Italian professional footballer who plays as a right-back for Serie A club Bologna.

== Club career ==
=== Atalanta ===
Zortea played for Atalanta under-19 squad in the 2017–18 and 2018–19 seasons.

==== Loan to Cremonese ====
On 30 July 2019, Zortea joined Serie B club Cremonese on a two-year loan.

Zortea made his professional Serie B debut for Cremonese on 24 August 2019 in a game against Venezia. He substituted Michele Castagnetti in the added time.

==== Loan to Salernitana ====
On 19 July 2021, Zortea joined Serie A club Salernitana on loan.

==== Loan to Sassuolo ====
On 31 January 2023, Zortea moved on loan to Sassuolo, with an option to buy.

==== Loan to Frosinone ====
On 18 January 2024, Zortea moved on a new loan to Frosinone.

=== Cagliari ===
On 17 July 2024, Zortea officially transferred to fellow Serie A side Cagliari on a permanent deal.

=== Bologna ===
On 20 August 2025, Zortea moved to Bologna.

== Career statistics ==
As of match played 17 October 2026

Appearances and goals by club, season and competition
Club	Season	League			Coppa Italia		Europe		Total	
Club	Season	Division	Apps	Goals	Apps	Goals	Apps	Goals	Apps	Goals
Cremonese (loan)	2019–20	Serie B	23	1	3	0	—		26	1
Cremonese (loan)	2020–21	Serie B	29	0	0	0	—		29	0
Cremonese (loan)	Total		52	1	3	0	0	0	55	1
Salernitana (loan)	2021–22	Serie A	29	1	0	0	—		29	1
Atalanta	2022–23	Serie A	9	1	1	0	—		10	1
Atalanta	2023–24	Serie A	5	1	1	0	1 (Note: Appearances in UEFA Europa League)	0	7	1
Atalanta	Total		14	2	2	0	1	0	17	2
Sassuolo (loan)	2022–23	Serie A	10	0	—		—		10	0
Frosinone (loan)	2023–24	Serie A	14	1	—		—		14	1
Cagliari	2024–25	Serie A	35	6	2	0	—		37	6
Bologna	2025–26	Serie A	31	0	1	0	10	0	42	0
Bologna	2026–27	Serie A	5	0	0	0	—		5	0
Bologna	Total		36	0	1	0	10	0	47	0
Career total			190	11	8	0	11	0	209	11
