= Giuseppe Ciocci =

Italian footballer

Personal information
- Date of birth: 14 January 2002 (age 24)
- Place of birth: Cagliari, Italy
- Height: 1.93 m (6 ft 4 in)
- Position: Goalkeeper

Team information
- Current team: Spezia
- Number: 22

Youth career
- 2013–2021: Cagliari

Senior career*
| Years | Team | Apps | (Gls) |
| 2021–2026 | Cagliari | 1 | (0) |
| 2021–2022 | → Olbia (loan) | 32 | (0) |
| 2023–2024 | → Pescara (loan) | 0 | (0) |
| 2024 | → Pontedera (loan) | 7 | (0) |
| 2026– | Spezia | 0 | (0) |
- * Club domestic league appearances and goals as of 23 August 2026

Giuseppe Ciocci (born 14 January 2002) is an Italian professional footballer who plays as a goalkeeper for Serie C Group B club Spezia.

== Club career ==
A youth product of Cagliari since 2013, Ciocci signed his first professional contract with the club on 4 February 2020 until 2024. On 14 July 2021, he joined Olbia on a season-long loan in the Serie D where he began his senior career. On 16 June 2022, he extended his contract with Cagliari until 2027. On 18 October 2022, he suffered a rupture to the anterior cruciate ligament that kept him off the field for a season. After his recovery, on 30 June 2023 he joined Pescara on a season-long loan in the Serie B. On 3 January 2024, he joined Pontedera on loan in the Serie C for the second half of the 2023–24 season.

On 23 May 2025, Ciocci debuted with Cagliari in the Serie A as a substitute in a 2–0 loss to Napoli. On 8 September 2025, he was promoted to the second goalkeeper for the club.

== Career statistics ==
As of match played 23 August 2025

Appearances and goals by club, season and competition
| Club | Season | League | | | National cup | | Europe | | Other | | Total | |
| Club | Season | Division | Apps | Goals | Apps | Goals | Apps | Goals | Apps | Goals | Apps | Goals |
|---|---|---|---|---|---|---|---|---|---|---|---|---|
| Cagliari | 2019–20 | Serie A | 0 | 0 | 0 | 0 | — | | — | | 0 | 0 |
| Cagliari | 2020–21 | Serie A | 0 | 0 | 0 | 0 | — | | — | | 0 | 0 |
| Cagliari | 2022–23 | Serie B | 0 | 0 | 0 | 0 | — | | 0 | 0 | 0 | 0 |
| Cagliari | 2024–25 | Serie A | 1 | 0 | 0 | 0 | — | | — | | 1 | 0 |
| Cagliari | 2025–26 | Serie A | 0 | 0 | 1 | 0 | — | | — | | 1 | 0 |
| Cagliari | Total | | 1 | 0 | 1 | 0 | — | | — | | 2 | 0 |
| Olbia (loan) | 2021–22 | Serie C | 32 | 0 | 1 | 0 | — | | — | | 33 | 0 |
| Pescara (loan) | 2023–24 | Serie C | 0 | 0 | 1 | 0 | — | | — | | 1 | 0 |
| Pontedera (loan) | 2023–24 | Serie C | 7 | 0 | — | | — | | — | | 7 | 0 |
| Career total | | | 40 | 0 | 3 | 0 | 0 | 0 | 0 | 0 | 43 | 0 |
