= Giorgio Scalvini =

Italian footballer (born 2003)

Personal information
- Date of birth: 11 December 2003 (age 22)
- Place of birth: Chiari, Italy
- Height: 1.94 m (6 ft 4 in)
- Position: Centre-back

Team information
- Current team: Atalanta
- Number: 42

Youth career
- –2013: Palazzolo
- 2013–2015: Brescia
- 2015–2021: Atalanta

Senior career*
Years	Team	Apps	(Gls)
2021–	Atalanta	113	(7)

International career^{‡}
2018	Italy U15	2	(0)
2019	Italy U16	3	(0)
2019–2020	Italy U17	4	(0)
2021–2022	Italy U19	8	(0)
2021–2023	Italy U21	6	(0)
2022–	Italy	13	(0)
- * Club domestic league appearances and goals as of 23:12, 22 May 2026 (UTC) ‡ National team caps and goals as of 15 November 2026

Giorgio Scalvini (born 11 December 2003) is an Italian professional footballer who plays as centre-back for Serie A club Atalanta and the Italy national team.

== Club career ==
=== Early career ===
Having been born in Chiari, he commenced his career playing for the Palazzolo scuola calcio, to continue at Brescia aged 10. He joined the Atalanta Youth Sector in 2015. On 8 November 2020, Scalvini was called up for a Serie A match against Inter Milan from the first squad's manager Gian Piero Gasperini, though remained an unused substitute. On 21 January 2021, Scalvini won the Supercup with the U19 team, defeating Fiorentina 3–1 in the final.

=== First team breakthrough ===
Scalvini debuted for Atalanta on 24 October 2021, aged 17, in a Serie A match draw 1–1 at home against Udinese, coming on as a substitute in the 85th minute. On 7 April 2022, Scalvini debuted in the UEFA Europa League in a match drawn 1–1 against German club RB Leipzig. Later that month, on 18 April, Scalvini scored his first goal in his career in Atalanta's 2–1 defeat to Verona. On 5 October 2023, he scored his first goal in European competitions in a 2–1 away victory over Sporting CP during the Europa League group stage.

On 22 May 2024, he made a second-half substitute appearance in Atalanta's 3–0 victory over German champions Bayer Leverkusen in the 2024 UEFA Europa League final. On 2 June, he scored his first goal of the 2023–24 Serie A in a 3–2 home defeat against Fiorentina on the final matchday, in which he sustained a knee injury late in the match.

== International career ==
Scalvini represented Italy internationally at under-15, under-16, under-17, and under-19 levels.

He made his debut with the Italy U21 on 16 November 2021, aged 17, playing as a starter in a friendly match won 4–2 against Romania in Frosinone.

On 24 January 2022, Scalvini accepted a call-up by Italy national team manager Roberto Mancini to join the Azzurri for a three-day training camp in Coverciano. He made his debut with the senior national team as a second-half substitute in a 5–2 loss against Germany on 14 June 2022.

On 23 May 2024, he was named in the 30-man preliminary squad for the UEFA Euro 2024. However, on 2 June, he sustained an ACL injury, withdrawing him from the preliminary squad, thus, ruling him out of the tournament.

== Style of play ==
Scalvini is a centre-back who has a good technique and is good at headers with his height of 1.94 metres (6 ft 4 in). He has also been likened to Alessandro Bastoni.

== Career statistics ==
=== Club ===
As of match played 22 May 2026

Appearances and goals by club, season and competition
Club	Season	League			National Cup (Note: Includes Coppa Italia)		Continental		Other		Total	
Club	Season	Division	Apps	Goals	Apps	Goals	Apps	Goals	Apps	Goals	Apps	Goals
Atalanta	2021–22	Serie A	18	1	1	0	2 (Note: Appearances in UEFA Europa League)	0	—		21	1
Atalanta	2022–23	Serie A	32	2	2	0	—		—		34	2
Atalanta	2023–24	Serie A	33	1	3	0	8	1	—		44	2
Atalanta	2024–25	Serie A	6	0	0	0	1 (Note: Appearance(s) in UEFA Champions League)	0	1 (Note: Appearance in Supercoppa Italiana)	0	8	0
Atalanta	2025–26	Serie A	24	3	3	0	3	0	—		30	3
Career total			113	7	9	0	14	1	1	0	137	8

=== International ===
As of match played 15 November 2026

Appearances and goals by national team and year
National team	Year	Apps	Goals
Italy	2022	3	0
Italy	2023	4	0
Italy	2024	1	0
Italy	2025	0	0
Italy	2026	5	0
Total		13	0

== Honours ==
Atalanta

- UEFA Europa League: 2023–24

Individual

- Best Italian Player Under 21: 2023
