= Roberto Piccoli =

Italian footballer (born 2001)

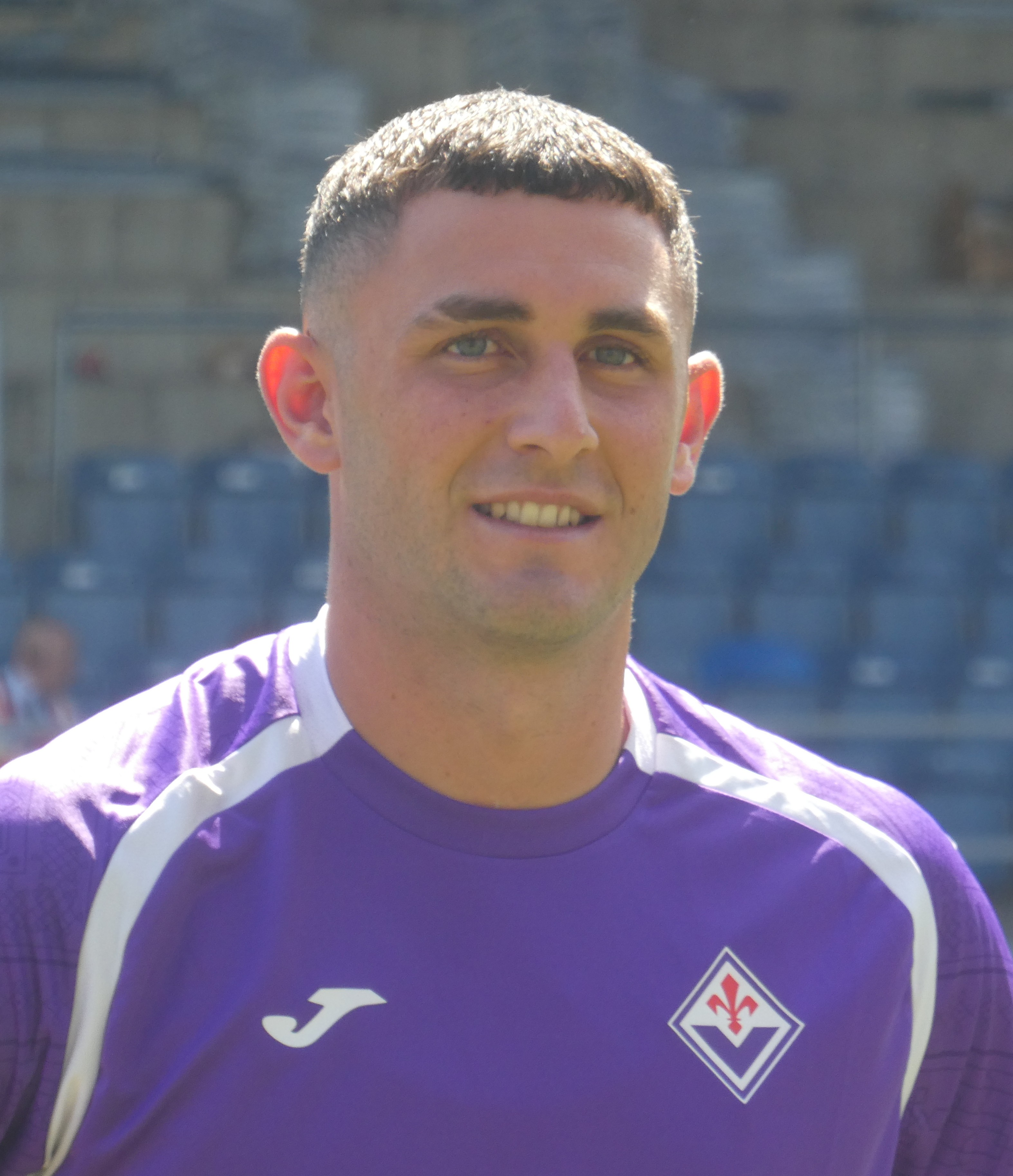
- Piccoli warming up for Fiorentina in 2026

Personal information
- Date of birth: 27 January 2001 (age 25)
- Place of birth: Bergamo, Italy
- Height: 1.90 m (6 ft 3 in)
- Position: Forward

Team information
- Current team: Bologna (on loan from (Fiorentina)
- Number: 91

Youth career
- 2011–2019: Atalanta

Senior career*
Years	Team	Apps	(Gls)
2019–2025	Atalanta	15	(1)
2020–2021	→ Spezia (loan)	20	(5)
2022	→ Genoa (loan)	5	(0)
2022–2023	→ Hellas Verona (loan)	7	(0)
2023	→ Empoli (loan)	15	(2)
2023–2024	→ Lecce (loan)	35	(5)
2024–2025	→ Cagliari (loan)	37	(10)
2025	Cagliari	0	(0)
2025–	Fiorentina	32	(4)
2026–	→ Bologna (loan)	7	(1)

International career^{‡}
2016	Italy U15	3	(0)
2016–2017	Italy U16	14	(4)
2018	Italy U18	3	(2)
2018–2020	Italy U19	22	(5)
2021	Italy U21	4	(0)
2025–	Italy	1	(0)
- * Club domestic league appearances and goals as of 20:05, 17 October 2026 (UTC) ‡ National team caps and goals as of 01:18, 15 October 2025 (UTC)

Roberto Piccoli (born 27 January 2001) is an Italian professional footballer who plays as a forward for Serie A club Bologna, on loan from Fiorentina, and the Italy national team.

== Club career ==
=== Youth ===
Piccoli began playing football at the age of ten for Tritium Calcio, which plays in the fourth division of Italian football. At the age of thirteen, he made a move to the youth academy of Atalanta after being noticed by Maurizio Costanzi, head of Atalanta youth development. Piccoli remained with Atalanta for the entirety of his youth career.

Piccoli had a successful youth career while playing for Atalanta in the Campionato Primavera 1. In the 2018–19 season, he scored 14 goals in the league which eventually helped Atalanta lift the Campionato Primavera 1 trophy. Piccoli had a similar performance in the 2019–20 season where he scored a total of 7 goals in the league which eventually saw his Atalanta side lift the Campionato Primavera 1 title once again.

=== Atalanta ===
Piccoli made his professional debut in a goalless Serie A draw against Empoli on 15 April 2019. On 15 September 2020, he joined Spezia on a season-long loan. Piccoli scored his first goal for Spezia in a 1–2 loss against Inter Milan on 20 December 2020.

Returning to Atalanta on 21 August 2021, Piccoli came on as a substitute for Atalanta in an away match against Torino and scored the winning goal in the 93rd minute, which was first goal for the Bergamo-based club in the top flight. Piccoli made several more substitute appearances for Atalanta throughout the season, and was named in the starting lineup for the first time against Lazio on 22 January 2022. Piccoli has made a total of 15 appearances for Atalanta in Serie A whilst only scoring one goal for Atalanta.

=== Loan moves ===
In 2022, Piccoli joined Genoa on loan for the remainder of the 2021–22 season after spending the first half of the season with Atalanta. He made his league debut against in a goalless draw against Roma as a substitute on 5 February. He made five appearances for Genoa during the remainder of the season, but did not score any goals. On 30 June, Piccoli joined Hellas Verona on loan for the 2022–23 season.

On 31 January 2023, Piccoli moved on loan to Empoli for one season, with an option to buy for Empoli and counter-option to buy back for Atalanta. On 31 August, his loan to Empoli was cut short and he moved on loan to Lecce instead, with an option to buy.

=== Later career ===
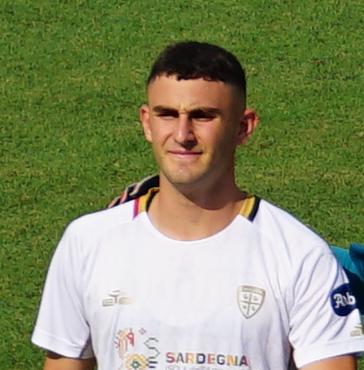
Piccoli lining up for Cagliari in 2024

On 17 July 2024, Piccoli moved to Cagliari on loan with an option to buy set at €12 million. On 24 June 2025, the club activated the option to buy and he signed a four-year contract. On 25 August 2025, Piccoli joined Fiorentina, reportedly signing a five-year contract for a fee of €25 million.

On 13 August 2026, Piccoli joined Bologna on loan.

== International career ==
=== Youth ===
On 24 April 2016, Piccoli debuted for Italy U15 as a substitute in a friendly match against England U15 on 24 April 2016, in which the Italians lost 2–3.

With the Italy U19 squad Piccoli took part in the 2019 UEFA European Under-19 Championship. While qualifying for the 2019 UEFA European Under-19 Championship, he scored two goals in a 2–0 victory against the Serbian U19 on 26 March 2019. Piccoli's U-19 side was knocked out in the group stage of the tournament after suffering defeats to both Portugal U19 and Spain U19.

On 3 September 2021, Piccoli made his debut with the Italy U21 squad as a starter in a 2023 UEFA European Under-21 Championship qualification won 3–0 against Luxembourg. Roberto Piccoli's last appearance for the Italy U21 squad was on 16 November 2021, playing as a starter in a friendly match won 4–2 against Romania U21.

=== Senior ===
Following an impressive first-half to the 2024-25 Serie A season with Cagliari, Piccoli spoke about his hopes for a possible call-up for the Italian senior team in an exclusive interview with Steven Moore of Canadian Serie A Broadcaster TLN TV, stating that he is "focused on working hard at the club level" as this is "the only way you can get to the national team." On 14 October 2025, he eventually debuted in a 3–0 2026 FIFA World Cup qualification home victory against Israel, replacing Mateo Retegui in the 90th minute.

== Style of play ==
Regarded as a talented young prospect, Piccoli is a player with good technique and a tall stature of 193 centimeters, while mostly being deployed as a center-forward. given the right opportunity His height allows him to be dangerous in the air. Gian Piero Gasperini, Atalanta's head coach, describes Piccoli "as great young talent who is a harder worker and a player that brings great value to the team." Piccoli describes himself as a "center-forward who loves to exploit the depth of the defense, while being technically gifted but also explaining he can still improve in that area." Piccoli has said that he is inspired by the likes of Duván Zapata and Mario Mandžukić.

== Personal life ==
On 22 January 2021, Piccoli met Pope Francis. He has a passion for cycling, which he uses to maintain fitness.

== Career statistics ==
=== Club ===
As of match played 17 October 2026

Appearances and goals by club, season and competition
Club	Season	League			Coppa Italia		Europe		Other		Total	
Club	Season	Division	Apps	Goals	Apps	Goals	Apps	Goals	Apps	Goals	Apps	Goals
Atalanta	2018–19	Serie A	2	0	0	0	0	0	–		2	0
Atalanta	2019–20	Serie A	1	0	0	0	0	0	–		1	0
Atalanta	2021–22	Serie A	12	1	0	0	0	0	–		12	1
Atalanta	Total		15	1	0	0	0	0	0	0	15	1
Spezia (loan)	2020–21	Serie A	20	5	3	1	–		–		23	6
Genoa (loan)	2021–22	Serie A	5	0	–		–		–		5	0
Hellas Verona (loan)	2022–23	Serie A	7	0	1	0	–		–		8	0
Empoli (loan)	2022–23	Serie A	13	2	–		–		–		13	2
Empoli (loan)	2023–24	Serie A	2	0	1	0	–		–		3	0
Empoli (loan)	Total		15	2	1	0	0	0	0	0	16	2
Lecce (loan)	2023–24	Serie A	35	5	1	1	–		–		36	6
Cagliari (loan)	2024–25	Serie A	37	10	3	1	–		–		40	11
Cagliari	2025–26	Serie A	0	0	1	1	–		–		1	1
Cagliari	Cagliari total		37	10	4	2	0	0	0	0	41	12
Fiorentina	2025–26	Serie A	32	4	1	1	10 (Note: Appearances in UEFA Conference League)	3	–		43	8
Bologna (loan)	2026–27	Serie A	7	1	0	0	–		–		7	1
Career total			173	28	11	5	10	3	0	0	194	36

=== International ===
As of match played 14 October 2025

Appearances and goals by national team and year
National team	Year	Apps	Goals
Italy	2025	1	0
Total		1	0

== Honours ==
Atalanta

- 2x Italian youth champion (Primavera) 18/19,19/20
- Italian Supercoppa Winner (Primavera) 19/20

Individual

- UEFA Youth League Top Scorer: 2019–20
- Cosme Damião Awards – Revelation of the Year: 2021
- Italian Golden Boy: 2021
- 20 man shortlist for the European Golden Boy award: 2021
