= Ademola Lookman =

Nigerian-English footballer (born 1997)

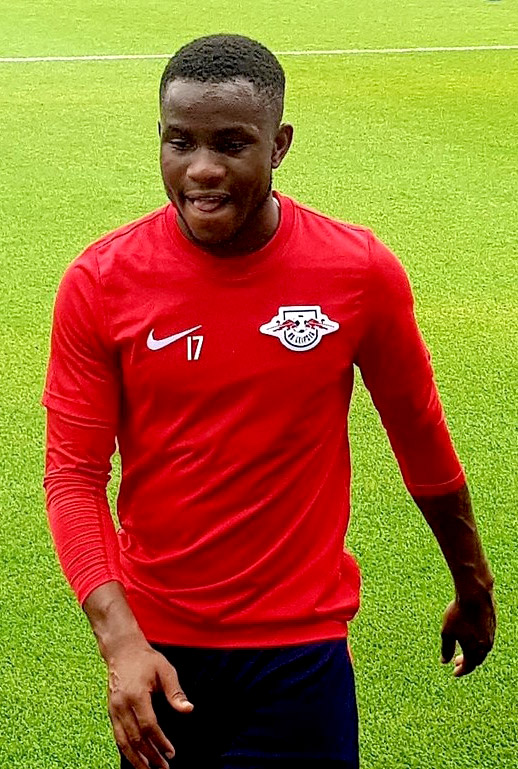
- Lookman with RB Leipzig in 2019

Personal information
- Full name: Ademola Lookman Olajade Alade Aylola Lookman
- Date of birth: 20 October 1997 (age 29)
- Place of birth: Wandsworth, Greater London, England
- Height: 5 ft 9 in (1.74 m)
- Positions: Winger; second striker

Team information
- Current team: Atlético Madrid
- Number: 11

Youth career
- 2013–2015: Charlton Athletic

Senior career*
Years	Team	Apps	(Gls)
2015–2017	Charlton Athletic	45	(10)
2017–2019	Everton	36	(1)
2018	→ RB Leipzig (loan)	11	(5)
2019–2022	RB Leipzig	11	(0)
2020–2021	→ Fulham (loan)	34	(4)
2021–2022	→ Leicester City (loan)	26	(6)
2022–2026	Atalanta	105	(41)
2026–	Atlético Madrid	23	(5)

International career^{‡}
2016	England U19	5	(0)
2016–2017	England U20	15	(4)
2017–2019	England U21	11	(1)
2022–	Nigeria	46	(11)
Medal record
Men's football
Representing England
FIFA U-20 World Cup
Winner	2017
Representing Nigeria
Africa Cup of Nations
Runner-up	2023
Third place	2025
- * Club domestic league appearances and goals as of 17:13, 31 October 2026 (UTC) ‡ National team caps and goals as of 23:27, 13 November 2026 (UTC)

Ademola Lookman Olajade Alade Aylola Lookman (born 20 October 1997) is a professional footballer who plays as a winger or second striker for La Liga club Atlético Madrid. Born in England, he plays for the Nigeria national team.

Lookman made his senior debut in 2015, playing as a forward for Charlton Athletic of the Championship. He signed for Everton in January 2017, where he played mainly as a winger. After joining Italian club Atalanta in 2022, he won the UEFA Europa League in 2024, scoring a hat-trick in the final against Bayer Leverkusen and subsequently being named the African Footballer of the Year, becoming the seventh Nigerian international to win the award. In January 2026, he joined Atlético.

Having represented England from under-19 to under-21 levels, Lookman made his senior debut for Nigeria in 2022. He was part of the squad that finished runners-up at the Africa Cup of Nations in 2023 and third place in 2025.

== Early life ==
Ademola Lookman Olajade Alade Aylola Lookman was born on 20 October 1997 in Wandsworth, Greater London, to Nigerian parents of Yoruba origin. He attended St Thomas the Apostle College in Nunhead where he achieved three A*s and five As in his GCSEs.

== Club career ==
=== Charlton Athletic ===
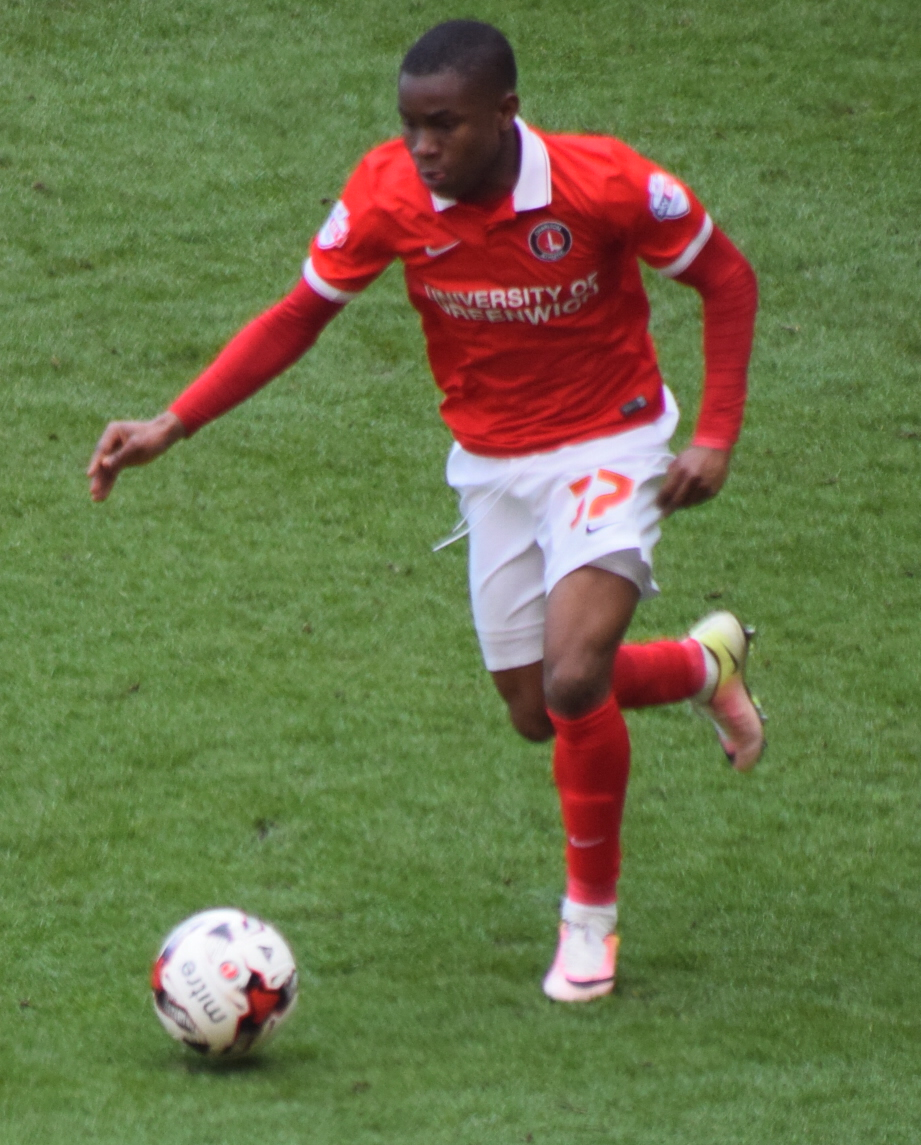
Lookman playing for Charlton Athletic in 2016

Lookman joined Charlton Athletic's academy in 2014 after signing from Waterloo, a youth football club based in the London Borough of Lambeth. His goalscoring record for Charlton's U18 and U21 teams led to him making a rapid ascent through the Charlton academy ranks and he made his first-team debut for the Addicks on 3 November 2015. He scored his first goal for the club in a 3–2 defeat at Brighton & Hove Albion on 5 December 2015, and then followed that up with both Charlton's goals in a 2–2 draw with Bolton Wanderers ten days later.

=== Everton and loan to RB Leipzig ===
Lookman signed a four-and-a-half-year contract with Everton on 5 January 2017 for an undisclosed fee, reported as an initial £7.5 million potentially rising to £11 million with add-ons. He made his debut for the club ten days later in a 4–0 victory over Manchester City, replacing Ross Barkley in the 90th minute and scoring the team's fourth goal. Lookman made his first European appearance for Everton in a 1–0 win over MFK Ružomberok in the Europa League third qualifying round first leg.

Although manager Sam Allardyce stated that Lookman would not be leaving on loan in the January 2018 transfer window, the club eventually arranged a loan move to Championship club Derby County, where they hoped he would play regular first-team football. However, the player insisted on an alternative move, and instead joined Bundesliga club RB Leipzig until the end of the 2017–18 season. In his first game with Leipzig, Lookman scored the winning goal in the away game against Borussia Mönchengladbach after coming on as a late substitute.

On 25 July 2019, Lookman returned to RB Leipzig on a five-year contract. On 30 September 2020, he joined Premier League side Fulham on a season-long loan. He scored his first league goal for Fulham against Sheffield United on 18 October.

On 31 August 2021, Lookman joined Leicester City on a season-long loan. On 11 September 2021, he made his Leicester debut as a 73rd-minute substitute during a 1–0 defeat to Manchester City. On 28 December 2021, he scored the only goal in their 1–0 win over Liverpool.

=== Atalanta ===
On 4 August 2022, Lookman joined Serie A club Atalanta on a four-year contract for a reported fee of €15 million. He scored on his debut for the club, a 2–0 Serie A win over Sampdoria on 13 August. In January 2023, he scored braces in three consecutive matches: a 8–2 Serie A win over Salernitana, a 5–2 Coppa Italia win over Spezia and a 3–3 Serie A draw to Juventus. On 22 May 2024, he scored his first career hat-trick, in the Europa League final at the Dublin Arena, as Atalanta defeated Bayer Leverkusen 3–0 to win the trophy for the first time in the club's history; in addition, he became the first player to score a hat-trick in a one-legged Men's European final since Pierino Prati in 1969, he also ended Bayer Leverkusen's 51 Game unbeaten streak.

On 4 September 2024, Lookman became the first current Atalanta player to receive a nomination for the Ballon d'Or due to his performances in Nigeria's build-up to the 2023 Africa Cup of Nations final as well as Atalanta's triumph in the 2023–24 UEFA Europa League, which saw them automatically qualify for the 2024–25 UEFA Champions League. However, following Atalanta's elimination from the competition at the hands of Belgian side Club Brugge, Lookman's boss, Gasperini, criticised the player for his penalty miss during the crucial second leg tie with Brugge, and proclaimed the Nigerian 'one of the worst penalty takers' he'd ever seen.

=== Atlético Madrid ===
On 1 February 2026, Atlético Madrid announced that they had reached an agreement with Atalanta for the transfer of Lookman for a reported deal of £30.3 million. He signed a four-and-a-half-year contract with the club the following day. Four days later, he made his debut, scoring a goal in a 5–0 away win over Real Betis in the Copa del Rey. It was a milestone 100th goal of his career. Two months later, on 14 April, he scored in a 2–1 home defeat to Barcelona in the Champions League quarter-final second leg, helping his side reach the semi-finals with a 3–2 aggregate victory, their first since 2017.

== International career ==
=== England ===
Lookman was born in England to Nigerian parents and is eligible for the national teams of both countries. He received his first international call-up when he was named in the England U19 squad for Mexico. He was subsequently named in the squad for the European U19 Championships that summer. In early 2017, Lookman turned down the opportunity to switch allegiance to Nigeria after an approach from the national coach, Gernot Rohr.

Lookman was selected in the England under-20 team for the 2017 FIFA U-20 World Cup. He scored three goals in the tournament, two against Costa Rica in the last 16 and one goal against Italy in the semi-finals. England beat Venezuela 1–0 in the final, to achieve the country's first victory in the final of a global tournament since the 1966 World Cup.

He received his first call-up for the England under-21s for European Championship qualifiers against the Netherlands under-21s and Latvia under-21s in September 2017. He made his debut in the first match, and set up Everton teammate Dominic Calvert-Lewin for England's goal in a 1–1 draw.

=== Nigeria ===
Lookman turned down Nigeria again in early 2018 after meeting with the president of the Nigeria Football Federation. He subsequently rejected Nigeria's approaches for a third time in September 2018, after England senior manager Gareth Southgate convinced him that he was part of his plans.

Despite his caps and success for England at youth level, and having previously rejected Nigeria's approaches, in January 2020 the Nigeria Football Federation announced that Lookman would be switching his international allegiance to Nigeria. However, Lookman also stated: "I've not changed my mind on wanting to represent England". On 10 February 2022, Lookman's request to represent the Nigerian national team was approved by FIFA. Lookman made his debut for Nigeria on 25 March 2022, in their scoreless draw with Ghana as part of the third round of the African section of qualification for the 2022 FIFA World Cup.

Lookman was named in Nigeria's squad for the 2023 Africa Cup of Nations held in the Ivory Coast. He scored both goals for Nigeria in their 2–0 win over Cameroon in the round of 16, before scoring their only goal in a 1–0 win over Angola in the quarter-final. Nigeria lost the final 1–2 to Ivory Coast. Lookman and the rest of the Nigeria team were named Members of the Order of the Niger in recognition of their performance.

On 11 December 2025, Lookman was called up to the Nigeria squad for the 2025 Africa Cup of Nations. On 23 December, he scored the winning goal for Nigeria in their opening match of the AFCON, securing a 2–1 victory against Tanzania. On 27 December, he continued his impressive form at the African tournament by providing two assists and scoring the winning goal to secure a 3–2 victory over Tunisia in the second group game. His impressive AFCON tournament form continued with another man of the match performance against Mozambique in the round of 16, scoring the opener and adding a hat-trick of assists to power the Super Eagles to a 4–0 victory.

== Style of play ==
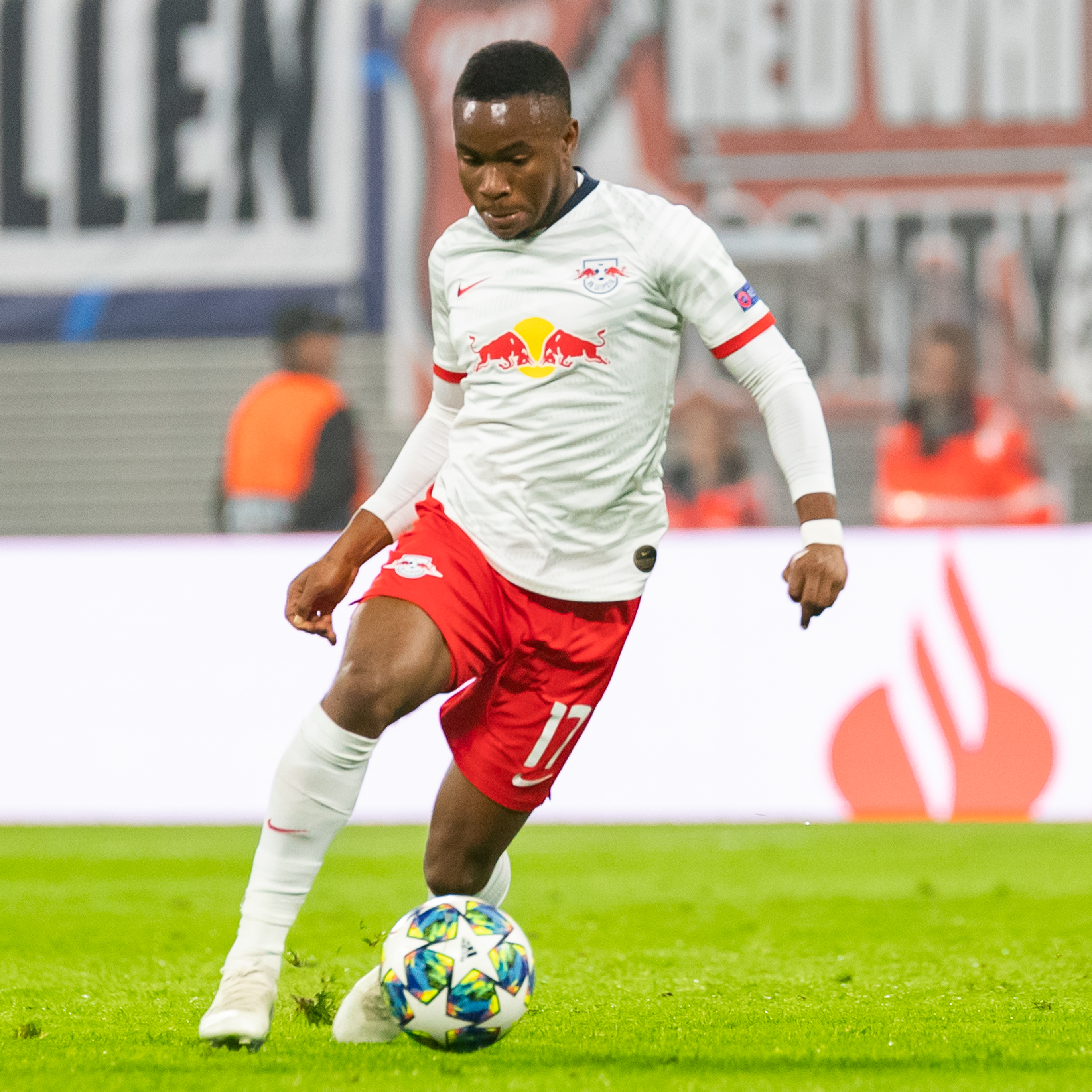
Lookman playing for RB Leipzig in 2019

Lookman is a winger with a dynamic style of play, known for his direct, pacey runs at the opposition defence, causing problems with his feet and control. He has a keen eye for goal and is able to finish chances with both feet, as well as with his head. Lookman is a creative player, who can unlock defences with his passing and movement off the ball. Lookman thrives in tight spaces and excels at taking on defenders using quick touches and body movement. He can burst past opponents from a standing start, making him a constant threat on the counterattack or when isolated on the wing. While naturally a left winger, Lookman can play on either flank, as a second striker, or in a central attacking midfield role.

== Career statistics ==
=== Club ===
As of match played 3 November 2026

Appearances and goals by club, season and competition
Club	Season	League			National cup (Note: Includes FA Cup, DFB-Pokal, Coppa Italia, Copa del Rey)		League cup (Note: Includes EFL Cup)		Europe		Other		Total	
Club	Season	Division	Apps	Goals	Apps	Goals	Apps	Goals	Apps	Goals	Apps	Goals	Apps	Goals
Charlton Athletic	2015–16	Championship	24	5	0	0	0	0	—		—		24	5
Charlton Athletic	2016–17	League One	21	5	3	2	1	0	—		0	0	25	7
Charlton Athletic	Total		45	10	3	2	1	0	—		0	0	49	12
Everton	2016–17	Premier League	8	1	—		—		—		—		8	1
Everton	2017–18	Premier League	7	0	1	0	2	0	6 (Note: Appearances in UEFA Europa League)	2	—		16	2
Everton	2018–19	Premier League	21	0	2	1	1	0	—		—		24	1
Everton	Total		36	1	3	1	3	0	6	2	—		48	4
RB Leipzig (loan)	2017–18	Bundesliga	11	5	—		—		—		—		11	5
RB Leipzig	2019–20	Bundesliga	11	0	1	0	—		1 (Note: Appearance(s) in UEFA Champions League)	0	—		13	0
Fulham (loan)	2020–21	Premier League	34	4	0	0	1	0	—		—		35	4
Leicester City (loan)	2021–22	Premier League	26	6	2	0	2	2	12 (Note: Four appearances in UEFA Europa League, eight appearances in UEFA Europa Conference League)	0	—		42	8
Atalanta	2022–23	Serie A	31	13	2	2	—		—		—		33	15
Atalanta	2023–24	Serie A	31	11	3	1	—		11	5	—		45	17
Atalanta	2024–25	Serie A	31	15	0	0	—		7	5	2 (Note: One appearance in UEFA Super Cup, one appearance in Supercoppa Italiana)	0	40	20
Atalanta	2025–26	Serie A	12	2	0	0	—		7	1	—		19	3
Atalanta	Total		105	41	5	3	—		25	11	2	0	137	55
Atlético Madrid	2025–26	La Liga	12	4	4	3	—		8	2	—		24	9
Atlético Madrid	2026–27	La Liga	11	1	0	0	—		4	1	0	0	15	2
Atlético Madrid	Total		23	5	4	3	—		12	3	0	0	39	11
Career total			291	72	18	9	7	2	56	16	2	0	374	99

=== International ===
As of match played 13 November 2026

Appearances and goals by national team and year
National team	Year	Apps	Goals
Nigeria	2022	6	1
Nigeria	2023	5	1
Nigeria	2024	16	6
Nigeria	2025	10	2
Nigeria	2026	9	1
Total		46	11

As of match played 5 January 2026
Scores and results list Nigeria's goal tally first, score column indicates score after each Lookman goal

List of international goals scored by Ademola Lookman
No.	Date	Venue	Cap	Opponent	Score	Result	Competition	Ref.
1	13 June 2022	Adrar Stadium, Agadir, Morocco	4	São Tomé and Príncipe	7–0	10–0	2023 Africa Cup of Nations qualification	
2	10 September 2023	Godswill Akpabio International Stadium, Uyo, Nigeria	8	São Tomé and Príncipe	2–0	6–0	2023 Africa Cup of Nations qualification	
3	27 January 2024	Felix Houphouet Boigny Stadium, Abidjan, Ivory Coast	16	Cameroon	1–0	2–0	2023 Africa Cup of Nations	
4	27 January 2024	Felix Houphouet Boigny Stadium, Abidjan, Ivory Coast	16	Cameroon	2–0	2–0	2023 Africa Cup of Nations	
5	2 February 2024	Felix Houphouet Boigny Stadium, Abidjan, Ivory Coast	17	Angola	1–0	1–0	2023 Africa Cup of Nations	
6	22 March 2024	Marrakesh Stadium, Marrakech, Morocco	20	Ghana	2–0	2–1	Friendly	
7	7 September 2024	Godswill Akpabio International Stadium, Uyo, Nigeria	24	Benin	1–0	3–0	2025 Africa Cup of Nations qualification	
8	7 September 2024	Godswill Akpabio International Stadium, Uyo, Nigeria	24	Benin	3–0	3–0	2025 Africa Cup of Nations qualification	
9	23 December 2025	Fez Stadium, Fez, Morocco	36	Tanzania	2–1	2–1	2025 Africa Cup of Nations	
10	27 December 2025	Fez Stadium, Fez, Morocco	37	Tunisia	3–0	3–2	2025 Africa Cup of Nations	
11	5 January 2026	Fez Stadium, Fez, Morocco	38	Mozambique	1–0	4–0	2025 Africa Cup of Nations	

== Honours ==
Atalanta

- UEFA Europa League: 2023–24
- Coppa Italia runner-up: 2023–24

Atlético Madrid

- Copa del Rey runner-up: 2025–26

England U20

- FIFA U-20 World Cup: 2017

Nigeria

- Africa Cup of Nations runner-up: 2023; third place: 2025

Individual

- LFE Apprentice of the Year (Championship): 2015–16
- Atalanta Player of the Season: 2022–23, 2023–24
- Africa Cup of Nations Team of the Tournament: 2023, 2025
- UEFA Europa League Team of the Season: 2023–24
- African Footballer of the Year: 2024
- CAF Team of the Year: 2024
- Serie A Team of the Season: 2024–25

Orders

- Member of the Order of the Niger: 2024
