= Tommaso Del Lungo =

Italian footballer

Personal information
- Date of birth: 21 November 2003 (age 22)
- Place of birth: Florence, Italy
- Height: 1.86 m (6 ft 1 in)
- Position: Centre-back

Team information
- Current team: Mantova
- Number: 58

Youth career
- 2007–2012: US Sales Calcio
- 2012–2016: Fiorentina
- 2016–2020: SM Cattolica Virtus

Senior career*
Years	Team	Apps	(Gls)
2020–2021	ASD Grassina	28	(0)
2021–2026	Atalanta	0	(0)
2023–2026	Atalanta U23	44	(4)
2025–2026	→ Virtus Entella (loan)	9	(1)
2026–	Mantova	1	(0)
- * Club domestic league appearances and goals as of 20 September 2026

Tommaso Del Lungo (born 21 November 2003) is an Italian professional footballer who plays as a centre-back for Serie B club Mantova.

== Club career ==
Del Lungo is a youth product of the Italian clubs Sales, Fiorentina and S.M. Cattolica Virtus. He began his senior career in the Serie D with ASD Grassina in the 2020–21 season. On 8 July 2021, he moved to Atalanta where he was initially assigned to their Primavera team. He debuted for their newly created Atalanta U23 side in their debut season in the Serie C for the 2023–24 season. He made his senior and professional debut with Atalanta in a 4–0 UEFA Europa League win over Raków Częstochowa on 14 December 2023.

On 1 September 2025, Del Lungo was loaned by Virtus Entella in Serie B.
