= Zito Luvumbo =

Angolan footballer

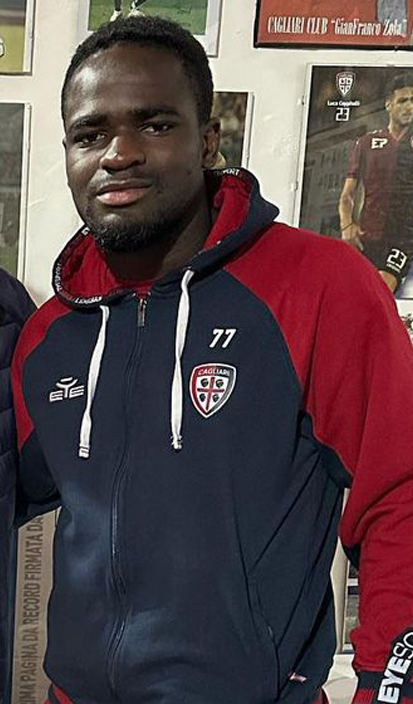
- Luvumbo with Cagliari in 2023

Personal information
- Full name: Zito André Sebastião Luvumbo
- Date of birth: 9 March 2002 (age 24)
- Place of birth: Luanda, Angola
- Height: 1.71 m (5 ft 7 in)
- Position: Winger

Team information
- Current team: Mallorca (on loan from Cagliari)
- Number: 15

Senior career*
Years	Team	Apps	(Gls)
2018–2020	Primeiro de Agosto	17	(6)
2020–	Cagliari	104	(9)
2021	→ Como (loan)	3	(0)
2026–	→ Mallorca (loan)	17	(1)

International career^{‡}
- Angola U17
2019–	Angola	34	(1)
- * Club domestic league appearances and goals as of 24 October 2026 ‡ National team caps and goals as of 22:25, 6 October 2026 (UTC)

Zito André Sebastião Luvumbo (born 9 March 2002) is an Angolan professional footballer who plays as a winger for Segunda División club Mallorca on loan from Serie A club Cagliari, and the Angola national team.

== Club career ==
Born in Luanda, Luvumbo began his career with Primeiro de Agosto, and underwent a trial with English club Manchester United's academy in February 2019. He was also linked with a transfer to Premier League club West Ham United.

On 23 September 2020, he signed a five-year contract with Serie A club Cagliari.

On 27 July 2021, he moved to Como on a season-long loan.

On 2 February 2026, Luvumbo joined Mallorca in La Liga on loan until the end of the season. On 10 July, his loan was extended for a further year, with a buyout clause.

== International career ==
Luvumbo played for Angola under-17s, and received his first-call up to the senior team in August 2019. In September 2019, he made his debut with the Angola national team in a 1–0 away win against Gambia.

In 2024, he participated in the 2023 Africa Cup of Nations with Angola, which was eliminated in the quarter-finals by the Nigeria national football team.

On 3 December 2025, Luvumbo was called up to the Angola squad for the 2025 Africa Cup of Nations.

== Career statistics ==
=== Club ===
As of match played 24 October 2026

Appearances and goals by club, season and competition
Club	Season	League			National cup		Continental		Other		Total	
Club	Season	Division	Apps	Goals	Apps	Goals	Apps	Goals	Apps	Goals	Apps	Goals
Como (loan)	2021–22	Serie B	3	0	1	0	—		—		4	0
Cagliari	2022–23	Serie B	41	5	2	0	—		—		43	5
Cagliari	2023–24	Serie A	30	4	2	0	—		—		32	4
Cagliari	2024–25	Serie A	26	2	2	0	—		—		28	2
Cagliari	2025–26	Serie A	12	0	2	0	—		—		14	0
Cagliari	Total		109	11	8	0	0	0	0	0	117	11
Mallorca (loan)	2025–26	La Liga	9	0	—		—		—		9	0
Mallorca (loan)	2026–27	Segunda División	8	1	0	0	—		—		8	1
Mallorca (loan)	Total		17	1	0	0	0	0	0	0	17	1
Career total			129	12	9	0	0	0	0	0	138	12

=== International ===
As of match played 6 October 2026

Appearances and goals by national team and year
National team	Year	Apps	Goals
Angola	2019	2	0
Angola	2020	1	0
Angola	2021	4	0
Angola	2023	4	0
Angola	2024	13	0
Angola	2025	8	1
Angola	2026	2	0
Total		34	1

Scores and results list Angola's goal tally first, score column indicates score after each Luvumbo goal.

List of international goals scored by Zito Luvumbo
No.	Date	Venue	Opponent	Score	Result	Competition
1	18 November 2025	Estádio 11 de Novembro, Talatona, Angola	Zambia	2–1	3–2	Friendly
