= Michel Ndary Adopo =

French footballer (born 2000)

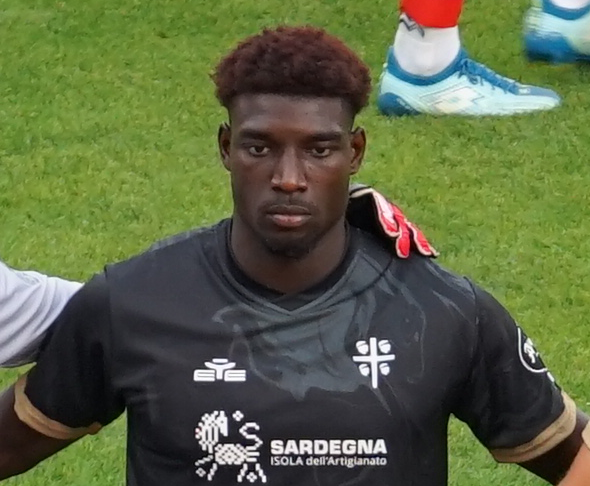
- Adopo in 2024 with Cagliari

Personal information
- Date of birth: 19 July 2000 (age 26)
- Place of birth: Villeneuve-Saint-Georges, France
- Height: 1.87 m (6 ft 2 in)
- Position: Midfielder

Team information
- Current team: Cagliari
- Number: 8

Youth career
- 2006–2013: Bussy-Saint-Georges
- 2013–2017: Torcy
- 2017–2020: Torino

Senior career*
Years	Team	Apps	(Gls)
2020–2023	Torino	11	(0)
2021–2022	→ Viterbese (loan)	50	(3)
2023–2025	Atalanta	10	(0)
2024–2025	→ Cagliari (loan)	35	(1)
2025–	Cagliari	49	(2)

International career
2018	France U18	3	(0)
- * Club domestic league appearances and goals as of 17:49, 7 November 2026 (UTC)

Michel Ndary Adopo (born 19 July 2000) is a French professional footballer who plays as a midfielder for Serie A club Cagliari.

== Club career ==
Adopo made his professional debut with Torino in a 2–0 Serie A win over Roma on 5 January 2020.

On 29 January 2021, he joined Serie C club Viterbese on loan. On 5 August 2021, the loan was renewed for the 2021–22 season.

Adopo returned to Torino for the 2022–23 season, registering 11 appearances across all competitions. On 11 January 2023, he scored in a 1–0 Coppa Italia win over AC Milan at San Siro.

Adopo joined fellow Serie A club Atalanta on 10 July 2023, then moved down south to Cagliari Calcio on 17 July 2024 for a one-year loan contract.

On 24 June 2025, Cagliari made the transfer permanent and signed a four-year contract with Adopo.

== Personal life ==
Born in France, Adopo is of Ivorian descent.

== Career statistics ==
As of match played 7 November 2026

Appearances and goals by club, season and competition
Club	Season	League			National cup (Note: Includes Coppa Italia)		Continental		Total	
Club	Season	Division	Apps	Goals	Apps	Goals	Apps	Goals	Apps	Goals
Torino	2019–20	Serie A	2	0	—		—		2	0
Torino	2022–23	Serie A	9	0	2	1	—		11	1
Torino	Total		11	0	2	1	0	0	13	1
Viterbese (loan)	2020–21	Serie C	16	1	—		—		16	1
Viterbese (loan)	2021–22	Serie C	34	2	3	0	—		37	2
Viterbese (loan)	Total		50	3	3	0	0	0	53	3
Atalanta	2023–24	Serie A	10	0	0	0	1 (Note: Appearance in UEFA Europa League)	0	11	0
Cagliari (loan)	2024–25	Serie A	35	1	3	0	—		38	1
Cagliari	2025–26	Serie A	38	1	3	0	—		41	1
Cagliari	2026–27	Serie A	11	1	2	0	—		13	1
Cagliari	Total		84	3	8	0	0	0	92	3
Career total			155	6	13	1	1	0	169	7

== Honours ==
Atalanta

- UEFA Europa League: 2023–24
