= Andrea Cambiaso =

Italian footballer (born 2000)

- Cambiaso in 2026

Personal information
- Full name: Andrea Cambiaso
- Date of birth: 20 February 2000 (age 26)
- Place of birth: Genoa, Italy
- Height: 1.82 m (6 ft 0 in)
- Positions: Full-back; wing-back

Team information
- Current team: Juventus
- Number: 20

Youth career
- 2015–2017: Genoa

Senior career*
Years	Team	Apps	(Gls)
2017–2022	Genoa	26	(1)
2017–2018	→ Albissola (loan)	21	(0)
2018–2019	→ Savona (loan)	32	(2)
2019–2020	→ Alessandria (loan)	17	(0)
2020–2021	→ Empoli (loan)	7	(0)
2022–	Juventus	103	(7)
2022–2023	→ Bologna (loan)	32	(0)

International career^{‡}
2021–2023	Italy U21	8	(0)
2024–	Italy	19	(3)
- * Club domestic league appearances and goals as of 23:11, 24 May 2026 (UTC) ‡ National team caps and goals as of 13 November 2025

Andrea Cambiaso (born 20 February 2000) is an Italian professional footballer who plays as a full-back or wing-back for Serie A club Juventus and the Italy national team.

== Club career ==
=== Genoa ===
Cambiaso is a product of Genoa youth teams. He spent 2017–18 and 2018–19 seasons on loan to Serie D clubs Albissola and Savona respectively. He helped Albissola achieve promotion to Serie C.

Cambiaso returned to Genoa for the 2021–22 season, scoring his first goal in Serie A on 29 August 2021 in a 2–1 home defeat against Napoli.

==== Loan moves to Alessandria and Empoli ====
On 2 August 2019, Cambiaso joined Serie C club Alessandria on loan. He made his professional Serie C debut for Alessandria on 25 August 2019 in the opening game against Gozzano, starting the game and playing the whole match. Cambiaso suffered an ACL tear on 4 December 2019 in a match against Juventus U23 (which was his 17th start for the club), the injury would keep him unable to play for the rest of the 2019–20 season.

On 21 September 2020, he joined Serie B club Empoli on loan with an option to purchase.

=== Juventus ===
On 14 July 2022, Juventus announced the signing of Cambiaso on a five-year contract. The following day, Cambiaso joined Bologna on a season-long loan.

On 28 October 2023, he scored his first goal for Juventus in the sixth minute of stoppage time in a 1–0 victory over Hellas Verona. On 15 May 2024, Cambiaso started in the Coppa Italia final as Juventus defeated Atalanta by a score of 1–0 to lift the trophy for a record-extending 15th time. On 24 May, he extended his contract with the club until 2029.

== International career ==
Cambiaso was called up to the senior Italy squad for UEFA Euro 2024 qualifying matches against North Macedonia and Ukraine, respectively on 17 and 20 November 2023.

On 21 March 2024, Cambiaso debuted for the Italian senior squad in friendly match against Venezuela.

== Career statistics ==
=== Club ===
As of match played 24 May 2026

Appearances and goals by club, season and competition
Club	Season	League			Coppa Italia		Europe		Other		Total	
Club	Season	Division	Apps	Goals	Apps	Goals	Apps	Goals	Apps	Goals	Apps	Goals
Genoa	2015–16	Serie A	0	0	0	0	–		–		0	0
Genoa	2016–17	Serie A	0	0	0	0	–		–		0	0
Genoa	2021–22	Serie A	26	1	2	0	–		–		28	1
Genoa	Total		26	1	2	0	–		–		28	1
Albissola (loan)	2017–18	Serie D	21	0	–		–		3 (Note: Appearances in Scudetto Serie D play-offs)	0	24	0
Savona (loan)	2018–19	Serie D	32	2	–		–		4 (Note: Appearances in Serie D promotion play-offs)	0	36	2
Alessandria (loan)	2019–20	Serie C	17	0	1	0	–		1 (Note: Appearance in Serie C promotion play-offs)	0	19	0
Empoli (loan)	2020–21	Serie B	7	0	2	0	–		–		9	0
Bologna (loan)	2022–23	Serie A	32	0	2	0	–		–		34	0
Juventus	2023–24	Serie A	34	2	5	1	–		–		39	3
Juventus	2024–25	Serie A	33	2	1	0	7 (Note: Appearances in UEFA Champions League)	0	5 (Note: One appearance in Supercoppa Italiana, four appearances in FIFA Club World Cup)	0	46	2
Juventus	2025–26	Serie A	36	3	2	0	9	0	–		47	3
Juventus	Total		103	7	8	1	16	0	5	0	132	8
Career total			238	10	15	1	16	0	13	0	282	11

=== International ===
As of match played 13 November 2025

Appearances and goals by national team and year
National team	Year	Apps	Goals
Italy	2024	13	2
Italy	2025	6	1
Total		19	3

As of match played 9 June 2025
Scores and results list Italy's goal tally first, score column indicates score after each Cambiaso goal

List of international goals scored by Andrea Cambiaso
No.	Date	Venue	Cap	Opponent	Score	Result	Competition
1	10 October 2024	Stadio Olimpico, Rome, Italy	10	Belgium	1–0	2–2	2024–25 UEFA Nations League A
2	17 November 2024	San Siro, Milan, Italy	13	France	1–2	1–3	2024–25 UEFA Nations League A
3	9 June 2025	Mapei Stadium, Reggio Emilia, Italy	14	Moldova	2–0	2–0	2026 FIFA World Cup qualification

== Honours ==
Juventus

- Coppa Italia: 2023–24
