= 2022–23 Cosenza Calcio season =

Cosenza Calcio
2022–23 season
- Chairman: Eugenio Guarascio
- Manager: Davide Dionigi
- Stadium: Stadio San Vito-Gigi Marulla
- Serie B: 17th
- Coppa Italia: Round of 64
Home colours

The 2022–23 season was the 109th in the history of Cosenza Calcio and their fifth consecutive season in the second division. The club participated in Serie B and Coppa Italia. The season covered the period from 1 July 2022 to 30 June 2023.

== Players ==
As of 19 August 2022

Note: Flags indicate national team as defined under FIFA eligibility rules; some limited exceptions apply. Players may hold more than one non-FIFA nationality.

No.	Pos.	Nation	Player
3	DF	(Italy) ITA	Andrea Rispoli
4	MF	(Italy) ITA	Marco Brescianini (on loan from AC Milan)
5	DF	(Italy) ITA	Michele Rigione
6	FW	(Italy) ITA	Giacomo Calò (on loan from Genoa)
7	MF	(Denmark) DEN	Emil Kornvig (on loan from Spezia)
9	FW	(Argentina) ARG	Joaquín Larrivey
10	MF	(Italy) ITA	Christian D'Urso
11	FW	(Italy) ITA	Enrico Brignola (on loan from Benevento)
12	GK	(Italy) ITA	Alessandro Lai
13	DF	(Italy) ITA	Andrea Meroni
14	DF	(Italy) ITA	Ciro Panico
15	DF	(Finland) FIN	Sauli Väisänen
18	FW	(Italy) ITA	Davide Merola (on loan from Empoli)
19	DF	(Italy) ITA	Agostino Camigliano
20	FW	(Italy) ITA	Marco Nasti (on loan from AC Milan)
21	MF	(Italy) ITA	Andrea Vallocchia

No.	Pos.	Nation	Player
22	GK	(Italy) ITA	Christian Sibilano
23	DF	(Italy) ITA	Michael Venturi
25	DF	(Italy) ITA	Paolo Gozzi (on loan from Genoa)
27	DF	(Italy) ITA	Pietro Martino
28	MF	(Ivory Coast) CIV	Alassane Sidibe (on loan from Atalanta)
31	GK	(Slovenia) SVN	Kristjan Matošević
32	FW	(Croatia) CRO	Karlo Butić (on loan from Pordenone)
33	DF	(Italy) ITA	Salvatore Dario La Vardera
34	MF	(Italy) ITA	Aldo Florenzi
36	MF	(Netherlands) NED	Rodney Kongolo
40	FW	(Italy) ITA	Massimo Zilli
42	MF	(Kosovo) KOS	Idriz Voca
48	FW	(Italy) ITA	Alessandro Arioli
67	MF	(Italy) ITA	Thomas Prestianni
77	GK	(Italy) ITA	Leonardo Marson

=== Out on loan ===
Note: Flags indicate national team as defined under FIFA eligibility rules; some limited exceptions apply. Players may hold more than one non-FIFA nationality.

No.	Pos.	Nation	Player
—	GK	(Italy) ITA	Mauro Vigorito (at Como until 30 June 2023)
—	DF	(Bulgaria) BUL	Andrea Hristov (at Reggiana until 30 June 2023)
—	MF	(Italy) ITA	Raffaele Maresca (at Livorno until 30 June 2023)

No.	Pos.	Nation	Player
—	MF	(Italy) ITA	Luca Pandolfi (at Juve Stabia until 30 June 2023)
—	MF	(Italy) ITA	Franck Teyou (at Torres until 30 June 2023)
—	FW	(Dominican Republic) DOM	Gianluigi Sueva (at Olbia until 30 June 2023)

== Pre-season and friendlies ==
Win Draw Loss

== Competitions ==
=== Overall record ===
Competition	First match	Last match	Starting round	Final position	Record							
Competition	First match	Last match	Starting round	Final position	Pld	W	D	L	GF	GA	GD	Win %
Serie B	14 August 2022	19 May 2023	Matchday 1	17th	38	9	13	16	30	53	−23	23.68
Coppa Italia	8 August 2022		Round of 64	Round of 64	1	0	0	1	0	1	−1	0.00
Total					39	9	13	17	30	54	−24	23.08

Source: Competitions

=== Serie B ===
==== League table ====
Pos	Team	Pld	W	D	L	GF	GA	GD	Pts	Promotion, qualification or relegation
15	Cittadella	38	9	16	13	34	45	−11	43 (Note: Ternana finished ahead of Cittadella on head-to-head goal difference: Cittadella 0–2 Ternana, Ternana 1–2 Cittadella.)	
16	Brescia	38	9	13	16	36	57	−21	40	Spared from relegation
17	Cosenza (O)	38	9	13	16	30	53	−23	40	Qualification for relegation play-out
18	Perugia (R)	38	10	9	19	40	52	−12	39	Relegation to Serie C
19	SPAL (R)	38	8	14	16	41	51	−10	38	Relegation to Serie C

Source: Soccerway (in English)
Rules for classification: 1) Points; 2) Head-to-head points; 3) Head-to-head goal difference; 4) Goal difference; 5) Goals scored; 6) Draw.
(O) Play-off winners; (R) Relegated

==== Results summary ====
Overall								Home						Away					
Pld	W	D	L	GF	GA	GD	Pts	W	D	L	GF	GA	GD	W	D	L	GF	GA	GD
38	9	13	16	30	53	−23	40	7	7	5	20	18	+2	2	6	11	10	35	−25

Source: Serie B

==== Results by round ====
Round	1	2	3	4	5	6	7	8	9	10	11	12	13	14	15	16	17	18	19	20	21	22	23	24	25	26	27	28	29	30	31	32	33	34	35	36	37	38
Ground	A	H	A	A	H	A	H	A	H	A	H	A	H	A	H	H	A	H	A	H	A	H	H	A	H	A	H	A	H	A	H	A	H	A	A	H	A	H
Result	W	W	L	D	L	D	W	L	L	L	L	L	W	D	D	D	L	L	L	D	L	W	D	L	D	L	W	L	W	W	W	D	D	D	L	D	D	L
Position		2																																				

Source: Serie B
A = Away; H = Home; W = Win; D = Draw; L = Loss

==== Matches ====
The league fixtures were announced on 15 July 2022.

14 August 2022 1	Benevento	0–1	Cosenza	Benevento
20:45 CEST (UTC+2)				Stadium: Stadio Ciro Vigorito

21 August 2022 2	Cosenza	2–1	Modena	Cosenza
CEST (UTC+2)				Stadium: Stadio San Vito-Gigi Marulla

28 August 2022 3	Parma	1–0	Cosenza
CEST (UTC+2)

3 September 2022 4	Ternana	1–1	Cosenza
CEST (UTC+2)

10 September 2022 5	Cosenza	0–1	Bari	Cosenza
CEST (UTC+2)				Stadium: Stadio San Vito-Gigi Marulla

17 September 2022 6	Südtirol	1–1	Cosenza
CEST (UTC+2)

30 September 2022 7	Cosenza	3–1	Como	Cosenza
CEST (UTC+2)				Stadium: Stadio San Vito-Gigi Marulla

8 October 2022 8	Reggina	3–0	Cosenza
CEST (UTC+2)

15 October 2022 9	Cosenza	1–2	Genoa	Cosenza
CEST (UTC+2)				Stadium: Stadio San Vito-Gigi Marulla

22 October 2022 10	SPAL	5–0	Cosenza
CEST (UTC+2)

29 October 2022 11	Cosenza	1–2	Frosinone	Cosenza
CEST (UTC+2)				Stadium: Stadio San Vito-Gigi Marulla

5 November 2022 12	Pisa	3–1	Cosenza
CET (UTC+1)

12 November 2022 13	Cosenza	3–2	Palermo	Cosenza
CET (UTC+1)				Stadium: Stadio San Vito-Gigi Marulla

27 November 2022 14	Cittadella	1–1	Cosenza
CET (UTC+1)

4 December 2022 15	Cosenza	0–0	Perugia	Cosenza
CET (UTC+1)				Stadium: Stadio San Vito-Gigi Marulla

8 December 2022 16	Cosenza	1–1	Brescia	Cosenza
CET (UTC+1)				Stadium: Stadio San Vito-Gigi Marulla

11 December 2022 17	Venezia	2–0	Cosenza
CET (UTC+1)

18 December 2022 18	Cosenza	1–3	Ascoli	Cosenza
CET (UTC+1)				Stadium: Stadio San Vito-Gigi Marulla

26 December 2022 19	Cagliari	2–0	Cosenza
CET (UTC+1)

=== Coppa Italia ===
8 August 2022 Round of 64	Bologna	1–0	Cosenza	Bologna
21:15 CEST (UTC+2)	Schouten (yellow card) 9'; Arnautović (yellow card) 61'; Sansone 65'	Report	Panico (yellow card) 36'; Venturi (yellow card) 87'	Stadium: Stadio Renato Dall'Ara; Referee: Giacomo Camplone
