= 2021–22 Cosenza Calcio season =

Cosenza Calcio
- Chairman: Eugenio Guarascio
- Manager: Roberto Occhiuzzi
- Stadium: Stadio San Vito-Gigi Marulla
- Serie B: 16th (play-off winners)
- Coppa Italia: First round
- Top goalscorer: League: Gabriele Gori (5); All: Gabriele Gori (5)

The 2021–22 season was Cosenza Calcio's fourth consecutive season in second division of the Italian football league, the Serie B, and the 108th as a football club.

== Players ==
=== First-team squad ===
As of 31 January 2022

Note: Flags indicate national team as defined under FIFA eligibility rules; some limited exceptions apply. Players may hold more than one non-FIFA nationality.

No.	Pos.	Nation	Player
4	MF	ITA	Marco Carraro (on loan from Atalanta)
5	DF	ITA	Michele Rigione
6	MF	NED	Reda Boultam (on loan from Salernitana)
7	MF	ITA	Luca Pandolfi
9	FW	ITA	Gabriele Gori (on loan from Fiorentina)
10	FW	ITA	Giuseppe Caso (on loan from Genoa)
11	FW	NOR	Julian Kristoffersen (on loan from Salernitana)
14	DF	ITA	Andrea Tiritiello
15	DF	FIN	Sauli Väisänen
16	MF	ITA	Michael Venturi
17	DF	ITA	Roberto Pirrello (on loan from Empoli)
18	DF	FRA	Sanasi Sy (on loan from Salernitana)
19	MF	ITA	Luca Palmiero (on loan from Napoli)
20	FW	ITA	Vincenzo Millico (on loan from Torino)
21	MF	ITA	Andrea Vallocchia

No.	Pos.	Nation	Player
23	DF	ITA	Michele Camporese (on loan from Pordenone)
24	GK	ITA	Edoardo Sarri (on loan from Juve Stabia)
25	MF	ITA	Alberto Gerbo
26	GK	ITA	Mauro Vigorito
27	DF	ITA	Luca Bittante
31	GK	CRO	Kristjan Matošević
34	MF	ITA	Aldo Florenzi
36	MF	NED	Rodney Kongolo
42	MF	KOS	Idriz Voca
55	DF	BUL	Andrea Hristov
77	MF	ALB	Emanuele Ndoj (on loan from Brescia)
92	MF	CRO	Mario Šitum (on loan from Reggina)
94	DF	ITA	Daniele Liotti (on loan from Reggina)
95	FW	FRA	Gaëtan Laura (on loan from Paris FC)
99	DF	ITA	Alessandro Di Pardo (on loan from Juventus)

=== Out on loan ===
Note: Flags indicate national team as defined under FIFA eligibility rules; some limited exceptions apply. Players may hold more than one non-FIFA nationality.

No.	Pos.	Nation	Player
2	DF	ITA	Angelo Corsi (at Vibonese until 30 June 2022)
79	FW	DOM	Gianluigi Sueva (at Potenza until 30 June 2022)

== Transfers ==
=== In ===
No.	Pos.	Player	Transferred from	Fee	Date	Source
17	DF	(Italy) Roberto Pirrello	(Italy) Empoli	Loan	31 August 2021	
95	FW	(France) Gaëtan Laura	(France) Paris FC	Loan	31 January 2022	

== Competitions ==
=== Overall record ===
Competition	First match	Last match	Starting round	Final position	Record							
Competition	First match	Last match	Starting round	Final position	Pld	W	D	L	GF	GA	GD	Win %
Serie B	21 August 2021	6 May 2022	Matchday 1	16th	38	8	11	19	36	59	−23	21.05
Serie B relegation play-out	12 May 2022	20 May 2022	First leg	Winners	2	1	0	1	2	1	+1	50.00
Coppa Italia	13 August 2021		First round	First round	1	0	0	1	0	4	−4	0.00
Total					41	9	11	21	38	64	−26	21.95

Source: Soccerway

=== Serie A ===
==== League table ====
Pos	Team	Pld	W	D	L	GF	GA	GD	Pts	Promotion, qualification or relegation
14	Reggina (Note: Reggina were deducted 2 points for administrative irregularities.)	38	13	9	16	31	49	−18	46	
15	SPAL	38	9	15	14	46	54	−8	42	
16	Cosenza (O)	38	8	11	19	36	59	−23	35	Qualification for relegation play-out
17	Vicenza (R)	38	9	7	22	38	59	−21	34 (Note: Vicenza finished ahead of Alessandria on head-to-head points: Vicenza 2–1 Alessandria, Alessandria 0–1 Vicenza.)	Qualification for relegation play-out
18	Alessandria (R)	38	8	10	20	37	59	−22	34	Relegation to Serie C

Source: Lega Serie B (in Italian), Soccerway (in English)
Rules for classification: 1) Points; 2) Head-to-head points; 3) Head-to-head goal difference; 4) Goal difference; 5) Goals scored; 6) Draw.
(O) Play-off winners; (R) Relegated

==== Results summary ====
Overall								Home						Away					
Pld	W	D	L	GF	GA	GD	Pts	W	D	L	GF	GA	GD	W	D	L	GF	GA	GD
38	8	11	19	36	59	−23	35	8	3	8	21	23	−2	0	8	11	15	36	−21

Source: Serie B

==== Results by round ====
Round	1	2	3	4	5	6	7	8	9	10	11	12	13	14	15	16	17	18	19	20	21	22	23	24	25	26	27	28	29	30	31	32	33	34	35	36	37	38
Ground	A	A	H	A	H	H	A	H	A	H	A	H	A	H	A	H	A	H	A	H	H	A	H	A	A	H	A	H	A	H	A	H	A	H	A	H	A	H
Result	L	L	W	D	W	W	L	D	L	W	L	L	D	L	L	L	D	L	D	L	D	D	L	L	D	W	L	W	L	D	L	L	D	L	L	W	D	W
Position	15	19	13	14	13	9	11	11	13	11	14	16	15	16	16	16	17	17	17	17	17	17	17	17	17	17	17	17	17	17	17	17	17	17	17	17	17	16

Source: Serie B
A = Away; H = Home; W = Win; D = Draw; L = Loss

==== Matches ====
The league fixtures were announced on 24 July 2021.

22 August 2021 1	Ascoli	1–0	Cosenza

27 August 2021 2	Brescia	5–1	Cosenza

12 September 2021 3	Cosenza	2–1	Vicenza	Cosenza
				Stadium: Stadio San Vito-Gigi Marulla

18 September 2021 4	Perugia	1–1	Cosenza

21 September 2021 5	Cosenza	2–0	Como	Cosenza
				Stadium: Stadio San Vito-Gigi Marulla

25 September 2021 6	Cosenza	1–0	Crotone	Cosenza
				Stadium: Stadio San Vito-Gigi Marulla

2 October 2021 7	Alessandria	1–0	Cosenza

16 October 2021 8	Cosenza	1–1	Frosinone	Cosenza
				Stadium: Stadio San Vito-Gigi Marulla

23 October 2021 9	Benevento	3–0	Cosenza

27 October 2021 10	Cosenza	3–1	Ternana	Cosenza
				Stadium: Stadio San Vito-Gigi Marulla

1 November 2021 11	Lecce	3–1	Cosenza

5 November 2021 12	Cosenza	0–1	Reggina	Cosenza
				Stadium: Stadio San Vito-Gigi Marulla

21 November 2021 13	Parma	1–1	Cosenza

27 November 2021 14	Cosenza	0–1	SPAL	Cosenza
				Stadium: Stadio San Vito-Gigi Marulla

30 November 2021 15	Monza	4–1	Cosenza

4 December 2021 16	Cosenza	0–2	Cremonese	Cosenza
				Stadium: Stadio San Vito-Gigi Marulla

11 December 2021 17	Pordenone	1–1	Cosenza

18 December 2021 18	Cosenza	0–2	Pisa	Cosenza
				Stadium: Stadio San Vito-Gigi Marulla

22 January 2022 20	Cosenza	1–3	Ascoli	Cosenza
				Stadium: Stadio San Vito-Gigi Marulla

30 January 2022 19	Cittadella	1–1	Cosenza

5 February 2022 21	Cosenza	0–0	Brescia	Cosenza
				Stadium: Stadio San Vito-Gigi Marulla

12 February 2022 22	Vicenza	0–0	Cosenza

15 February 2022 23	Cosenza	1–2	Perugia	Cosenza
				Stadium: Stadio San Vito-Gigi Marulla

20 February 2022 24	Como	2–1	Cosenza

23 February 2022 25	Crotone	3–3	Cosenza

26 February 2022 26	Cosenza	2–1	Alessandria	Cosenza
				Stadium: Stadio San Vito-Gigi Marulla

2 March 2022 27	Frosinone	1–0	Cosenza

12 March 2022 29	Ternana	2–0	Cosenza

15 March 2022 30	Cosenza	2–2	Lecce	Cosenza
				Stadium: Stadio San Vito-Gigi Marulla

19 March 2022 31	Reggina	1–0	Cosenza

2 April 2022 32	Cosenza	1–3	Parma	Cosenza
				Stadium: Stadio San Vito-Gigi Marulla

5 April 2022 33	SPAL	2–2	Cosenza

10 April 2022 34	Cosenza	0–2	Monza	Cosenza
				Stadium: Stadio San Vito-Gigi Marulla

14 April 2022 28	Cosenza	1–0	Benevento	Cosenza
				Stadium: Stadio San Vito-Gigi Marulla

18 April 2022 35	Cremonese	3–1	Cosenza

25 April 2022 36	Cosenza	3–1	Pordenone	Cosenza
				Stadium: Stadio San Vito-Gigi Marulla

30 April 2022 37	Pisa	1–1	Cosenza

6 May 2022 38	Cosenza	1–0	Cittadella	Cosenza
				Stadium: Stadio San Vito-Gigi Marulla

==== Relegation play-out ====
12 May 2022 First leg	Vicenza	1–0	Cosenza	Vicenza
20:30 CEST (UTC+2)	Maggio 90'	Report		Stadium: Stadio Romeo Menti

20 May 2022 Second leg	Cosenza	2–0 (2–1 agg.)	Vicenza	Cosenza
20:30 CEST (UTC+2)		Report		Stadium: Stadio San Vito-Gigi Marulla

=== Coppa Italia ===
13 August 2021 First round	Fiorentina	4–0	Cosenza	Florence
21:00 CEST (UTC+2)	Vlahović 4', 45+4'; González 37'; Venuti 51'; Pezzella (yellow card) 54'	Report	Prestianni (yellow card) 45+1'; Sueva (yellow card) 56'	Stadium: Stadio Artemio Franchi; Attendance: 3,600; Referee: Giacomo Camplone
