= 2023–24 Parma Calcio 1913 season =

Parma Calcio 1913
2023–24 season
- Owner: Krause Group
- Chairman: Kyle Krause
- Manager: Fabio Pecchia
- Stadium: Stadio Ennio Tardini
- Serie B: 1st (promoted)
- Coppa Italia: Round of 16
- Top goalscorer: League: Dennis Man (11); All: Dennis Man (13)
- Average home league attendance: 13,441
- Biggest win: Catanzaro 0–5 Parma
Home colours	Away colours	Third colours

The 2023–24 season was Parma Calcio 1913's 15th season in existence and the club's third consecutive season in the second division of Italian football. In addition to the domestic league, Parma participated in this season's edition of the Coppa Italia. The season covers the period from 1 July 2023 to 30 June 2024.

On 1 May 2024, Parma secured promotion to the Serie A after a three-year absence.

== Players ==
=== First-team squad ===
As of 3 September 2023

Note: Flags indicate national team as defined under FIFA eligibility rules; some limited exceptions apply. Players may hold more than one non-FIFA nationality.

No.	Pos.	Nation	Player
1	GK	ARG	Leandro Chichizola
3	DF	VEN	Yordan Osorio
4	DF	HUN	Botond Balogh
7	FW	POL	Adrian Benedyczak
8	MF	ARG	Nahuel Estévez
9	FW	CGO	Gabriel Charpentier
10	MF	ESP	Adrián Bernabé
11	FW	SLO	Tjaš Begić
13	FW	FRA	Ange-Yoan Bonny
14	DF	ARG	Cristian Ansaldi
15	DF	ITA	Enrico Del Prato
17	FW	CRO	Antonio Čolak
19	MF	SUI	Simon Sohm
20	MF	FRA	Antoine Hainaut

No.	Pos.	Nation	Player
21	FW	ITA	Anthony Partipilo
22	GK	SLO	Martin Turk
23	MF	CIV	Drissa Camara
26	DF	FRA	Woyo Coulibaly
27	MF	BRA	Hernani
28	MF	ROU	Valentin Mihăilă
30	DF	ARG	Lautaro Valenti
39	DF	AUS	Alessandro Circati
40	GK	ITA	Edoardo Corvi
47	DF	GRE	Vasilios Zagaritis
61	FW	TUN	Anas Haj Mohamed
77	DF	ITA	Gianluca Di Chiara
98	MF	ROU	Dennis Man

=== Others players under contract ===
Note: Flags indicate national team as defined under FIFA eligibility rules; some limited exceptions apply. Players may hold more than one non-FIFA nationality.

No.	Pos.	Nation	Player
—	GK	ITA	Francesco Borriello
—	MF	FRA	Wylan Cyprien

No.	Pos.	Nation	Player
—	FW	ITA	Roberto Inglese
—	FW	ITA	Paolo Napoletano

=== Out on loan ===
As of 6 September 2023

Note: Flags indicate national team as defined under FIFA eligibility rules; some limited exceptions apply. Players may hold more than one non-FIFA nationality.

No.	Pos.	Nation	Player
—	GK	ITA	Filippo Rinaldi (at Olbia until 30 June 2024)
—	DF	BEL	Elias Cobbaut (at Mechelen until 30 June 2024)
—	DF	ITA	Giovanni Vaglica (at Trento until 30 June 2024)
—	MF	FRA	Nathan Buayi-Kiala (at Auxerre until 30 June 2024)
—	MF	CRO	Stanko Jurić (at Valladolid until 30 June 2024)
—	MF	ITA	Stefano Palmucci (at Fermana until 30 June 2024)

No.	Pos.	Nation	Player
—	MF	ITA	Fabian Pavone (at Turris until 30 June 2024)
—	FW	ITA	Daniele Iacoponi (at Rimini until 30 June 2024)
—	FW	ITA	Eric Lanini (at Reggiana until 30 June 2024)
—	FW	LAT	Dario Šits (at SPAL until 30 June 2024)
—	FW	ITA	Gennaro Tutino (at Cosenza until 30 June 2024)

== Transfers ==
=== In ===
Pos.	Player	Transferred from	Fee	Date	Source

=== Out ===
Pos.	Player	Transferred to	Fee	Date	Source
GK	Gianluigi Buffon	Retired	N/A	2 August 2023	

== Competitions ==
=== Overview ===
Competition	First match	Last match	Starting round	Final position	Record							
Competition	First match	Last match	Starting round	Final position	Pld	W	D	L	GF	GA	GD	Win %
Serie B	20 August 2023	10 May 2024	Matchday 1	Winners	38	21	13	4	66	35	+31	55.26
Coppa Italia	12 August 2023	6 December 20223	Round of 64	Round of 16	3	2	1	0	9	4	+5	66.67
Total					41	23	14	4	75	39	+36	56.10

Source: Soccerway

=== Serie B ===
==== League table ====
Pos	Team	Pld	W	D	L	GF	GA	GD	Pts	Promotion, qualification or relegation
1	Parma (C, P)	38	21	13	4	66	35	+31	76	Promotion to Serie A
2	Como (P)	38	21	10	7	58	40	+18	73	Promotion to Serie A
3	Venezia (O, P)	38	21	7	10	69	46	+23	70	Qualification for promotion play-offs semi-finals
4	Cremonese	38	19	10	9	50	32	+18	67	Qualification for promotion play-offs semi-finals
5	Catanzaro	38	17	9	12	59	50	+9	60	Qualification for promotion play-offs preliminary round

Source: Soccerway (in English)
Rules for classification: 1) Points; 2) Head-to-head points; 3) Head-to-head goal difference; 4) Goal difference; 5) Goals scored; 6) Draw.
(Note: Head-to-head record is used only after all the matches between the teams in question have been played)
(C) Champions; (O) Play-off winners; (P) Promoted

==== Results summary ====
Overall								Home						Away					
Pld	W	D	L	GF	GA	GD	Pts	W	D	L	GF	GA	GD	W	D	L	GF	GA	GD
38	21	13	4	66	35	+31	76	11	7	1	34	17	+17	10	6	3	32	18	+14

==== Results by round ====
Round	1	2	3	4	5	6	7	8	9	10	11	12	13	14	15	16	17	18	19	20	21	22	23	24	25	26	27	28	29	30	31	32	33	34	35	36	37	38
Ground	H	H	A	H	A	H	H	A	A	H	A	H	A	H	A	H	A	H	A	H	A	A	H	A	H	A	H	A	H	A	H	A	H	A	H	A	H	A
Result	W	W	W	D	W	D	W	W	L	W	W	W	L	D	W	D	D	W	W	D	W	L	W	W	W	D	D	W	W	W	L	D	W	D	W	D	D	D
Position	3	1	1	1	1	1	1	1	2	1	1	1	2	2	1	1	1	1	1	1	1	1	1	1	1	1	1	1	1	1	1	1	1	1	1	1	1	1

A = Away; H = Home; W = Win; D = Draw; L = Loss

==== Matches ====
The league fixtures were unveiled on 11 July 2023.

20 August 2023 1	Parma	2–0	Feralpisalò	Parma
20:30 CEST (UTC+2)	Benedyczak 37' (pen.); Bernabé 66'			Stadium: Stadio Ennio Tardini; Referee: Marco Monaldi

26 August 2023 2	Parma	2–0	Cittadella	Parma
20:30 CEST (UTC+2)	Benedyczak 3' (pen.); Bernabé 48'			Stadium: Stadio Ennio Tardini; Referee: Davide Ghersini

29 August 2023 3	Pisa	1–2	Parma	Pisa
20:30 CEST (UTC+2)	Valoti 85' (pen.)		Bonny 14'; Čolak 90+4'	Stadium: Arena Garibaldi; Referee: Manuel Volpi

2 September 2023 4	Parma	0–0	Reggiana	Parma
18:30 CEST (UTC+2)				Stadium: Stadio Ennio Tardini; Referee: Gianluca Manganiello

17 September 2023 5	Catanzaro	0–5	Parma	Catanzaro
16:15 CEST (UTC+2)				Stadium: Stadio Nicola Ceravolo; Referee: Gianluca Aureliano

24 September 2023 6	Parma	1–1	Sampdoria	Parma
16:15 CEST (UTC+2)				Stadium: Stadio Ennio Tardini; Referee: Davide Massa

27 September 2023 7	Parma	2–1	Bari	Parma
20:30 CEST (UTC+2)				Stadium: Stadio Ennio Tardini; Referee: Juan Luca Sacchi

1 October 2023 8	Cremonese	1–2	Parma	Cremona
18:30 CEST (UTC+2)				Stadium: Stadio Giovanni Zini; Referee: Alessandro Prontera

7 October 2023 9	Venezia	3–2	Parma	Venice
16:15 CEST (UTC+2)

20 October 2023 10	Parma	2–1	Como	Parma
16:15 CEST (UTC+2)				Stadium: Stadio Ennio Tardini

28 October 2023 11	Ascoli	1–3	Parma	Ascoli Piceno
18:00 CEST (UTC+2)				Stadium: Stadio Cino e Lillo Del Duca

5 November 2023 12	Parma	2–0	Südtirol	Parma
16:15 CET (UTC+1)	Bonny 9'; Man 57' (pen.)			Stadium: Stadio Ennio Tardini

12 November 2023 13	Lecco	3–2	Parma	Lecco
16:15 CET (UTC+1)	Mats Lemmens (yellow card) 12'; Novakovich 23'; Degli Innocenti (yellow card) 38'; Nicolò Buso 42'; Marrone (yellow card) 53'; Lepore 57'	Report	Benedyczak 12' (pen.) (yellow card) 13'; Hernani (yellow card) 19' (yellow-red card) 31'; Charpentier 70'; Chichizola (yellow card) 90+10'	Stadium: Stadio Rigamonti-Ceppi; Attendance: 4,983; Referee: (Italy) Luca Pairetto

25 November 2023 14	Parma	1–1	Modena	Parma
14:00 CET (UTC+1)	Estévez (yellow card) 35'; Sohm (yellow card) 63' (red card) 90+11'; Di Chiara (yellow card) 63'; Balogh (yellow card) 79'; Partipilo 90+3'	Report	Duca 59'; Seculin (yellow card) 86'; Falcinelli (yellow card) 90+8'	Stadium: Stadio Ennio Tardini; Attendance: 13,761; Referee: (Italy) Daniele Chiffi

2 December 2023 15	Spezia	0–1	Parma	La Spezia
16:15 CET (UTC+1)	Żurkowski (yellow card) 34'	Report	Camara (yellow card) 44'; Partipilo (yellow card) 64'; João Moutinho 90+4' (o.g.)	Stadium: Stadio Alberto Picco; Attendance: 7,022; Referee: (Italy) Gianluca Manganiello

10 December 2023 16	Parma	3–3	Palermo	Parma
16:15 CET (UTC+1)	Balogh (yellow card) 35'; Estévez 51'; Del Prato (yellow card) 55'; Bonny (yellow card) 64'; Benedyczak (yellow card) 90'; Mihăilă 90+1'; Charpentier 90+5'	Report	Brunori 3' 18'; Di Francesco (yellow card) 16'; Valente (yellow card) 80'; Segre 85'; Matějů (yellow card) 90'	Stadium: Stadio Ennio Tardini; Attendance: 13,409; Referee: (Italy) Davide Massa

16 December 2023 17	Cosenza	0–0	Parma	Cosenza
16:15 CET (UTC+1)	Voca (yellow card) 12'; Fontanarosa (yellow card) 32'; Sgarbi (yellow card) 57'; Martino (yellow card) 70'; Venturi (yellow card) 78'; Florenzi (yellow card) 89'	Report	Antoine Hainaut (yellow card) 4' (yellow-red card) 6'; Circati (yellow card) 48'; Adrián Bernabé (yellow card) 90+5'	Stadium: Stadio San Vito-Gigi Marulla; Attendance: 3,631; Referee: (Italy) Niccoló Baroni

23 December 2023 18	Parma	3–1	Ternana	Parma
14:00 CET (UTC+1)	Man 10'; Cyprien 52'; Adrián Bernabé 55'	Report	Raimondo 8'; Łabojko (yellow card) 14'; Lorenzo Lucchesi (yellow card) 68'; Mărginean (yellow card) 88'	Stadium: Stadio Ennio Tardini; Attendance: 11,895; Referee: (Italy) Federico Dionisi

26 December 2023 19	Brescia	0–2	Parma	Brescia
15:00 CET (UTC+1)	Cistana (yellow card) 31'; Bianchi (yellow card) 60'; Galazzi (yellow card) 65'; Paghera (yellow card) 71'; Borrelli (yellow card) 86'	Report	Adrián Bernabé 18'; Man 24'; Mihăilă (yellow card) 67'; Circati (yellow card) 77'; Benedyczak (yellow card) 86'; Del Prato (yellow card) 90+1'	Stadium: Stadio Mario Rigamonti; Attendance: 8,604; Referee: (Italy) Giovanni Ayroldi

14 January 2024 20	Parma	1–1	Ascoli	Parma
16:15 CET (UTC+1)	Mihăilă (yellow card) 50'; Di Chiara (yellow card) 65'; Viviano 70' (o.g.)	Report	Masini (yellow card) 30'; Eric Botteghin 60'; Bellusci (yellow card) 73' (yellow-red card) 90+3'; Quaranta (yellow card) 80'	Stadium: Stadio Ennio Tardini; Attendance: 11,269; Referee: (Italy) Francesco Forneau

19 January 2024 21	Sampdoria	0–3	Parma	Genoa
20:30 CET (UTC+1)	Verre (yellow card) 74'	Report	Man 41' (pen.); Mihăilă 44'; Estévez 70'; Chichizola (yellow card) 78'	Stadium: Stadio Luigi Ferraris; Attendance: 21,704; Referee: (Italy) Ermanno Feliciani

27 January 2024 22	Modena	3–0	Parma	Modena
14:00 CET (UTC+1)	Battistella 16' (yellow card) 61'; Fabio Abiuso 23'; Riccio (yellow card) 37'; Ponsi 47'	Report	Osorio (yellow card) 58'	Stadium: Stadio Alberto Braglia; Attendance: 11,143; Referee: (Italy) Rosario Abisso

3 February 2024 23	Parma	2–1	Venezia	Parma
14:00 CET (UTC+1)	Mihăilă 21'; Di Chiara (yellow card) 90+8'; Camara 90+10' (yellow card) 90+11'	Report	Tessmann (yellow card) 16'; Pohjanpalo 26'; Ellertsson (yellow card) 32'	Stadium: Stadio Ennio Tardini; Attendance: 13,289; Referee: (Italy) Matteo Marchetti

10 February 2024 24	Cittadella	1–2	Parma	Cittadella
14:00 CET (UTC+1)	Negro (yellow card) 2' (goal) 45+3'; Angeli (yellow card) 37'	Report	Adrián Bernabé 8'; Estévez (yellow card) 16'; Hernani 38'; Del Prato (yellow card) 56'	Stadium: Stadio Pier Cesare Tombolato; Attendance: 4,170; Referee: (Italy) Giovanni Ayroldi

17 February 2024 25	Parma	3–2	Pisa	Parma
14:00 CET (UTC+1)	Benedyczak 25'; Charpentier (yellow card) 73'; Man 81'; Coulibaly (yellow card) 90+2'; Del Prato 90+5'	Report	Valoti 35'; Canestrelli (yellow card) 64' (goal) 90+2'; Tramoni (yellow card) 87'; Nícolas (yellow card) 90+6'	Stadium: Stadio Ennio Tardini; Attendance: 13,899; Referee: (Italy) Ivano Pezzuto

24 February 2024 26	Como	1–1	Parma	Como
16:15 CET (UTC+1)	Verdi 24'; Da Cunha (yellow card) 40'; Goldaniga (yellow card) 87'	Report	Benedyczak 3'; Estévez (yellow card) 89'; Hernani (yellow card) 90'	Stadium: Stadio Giuseppe Sinigaglia; Attendance: 7,226; Referee: (Italy) Daniele Chiffi

27 February 2024 27	Parma	1–1	Cosenza	Parma
20:30 CET (UTC+1)	Cyprien 2'; Balogh (yellow card) 63' (yellow-red card) 73'; Camara (yellow card) 67'; Benedyczak (yellow card) 69'	Report	Venturi (yellow card) 30'; Camporese 40'; Antonucci (yellow card) 69'; Mazzocchi (yellow card) 89'	Stadium: Stadio Ennio Tardini; Attendance: 10,824; Referee: (Italy) Manuel Volpi

2 March 2024 28	Ternana	1–3	Parma	Terni
14:00 CET (UTC+1)	Capuano (yellow card) 34'; Luperini 48'; de Boer (yellow card) 66'; Iannarilli (yellow card) 89'	Report	Bonny 7' (yellow card) 42'; Benedyczak 19' (pen.); Partipilo (yellow card) 30'; Casasola 59' (o.g.); Cyprien (yellow card) 65'; Circati (yellow card) 87'; Mihăilă (yellow card) 90+3'	Stadium: Stadio Libero Liberati; Attendance: 4,929; Referee: (Italy) Giuseppe Collu

8 March 2024 29	Parma	2–1	Brescia	Parma
20:30 CET (UTC+1)	Di Chiara (yellow card) 39'; Man 52'; Del Prato 89'; Adrián Bernabé (yellow card) 90+1'	Report	Jallow 16'; Huard (yellow card) 87' (yellow-red card) 87'; Bertagnoli (yellow card) 90+2'	Stadium: Stadio Ennio Tardini; Attendance: 13,350; Referee: (Italy) Livio Marinelli

16 March 2024 30	FeralpiSalò	1–2	Parma	Piacenza
14:00 CET (UTC+1)	Dubickas 65'; Fiordilino (yellow card) 90+2'	Report	Mihăilă 29'; Estévez 68'; Charpentier (yellow card) 90+2'	Stadium: Stadio Leonardo Garilli; Attendance: 2,833; Referee: (Italy) Matteo Gualtieri

1 April 2024 31	Parma	0–2	Catanzaro	Parma
15:00 CET (UTC+1)		Report	Biasci 11'; Matias Antonini 39'	Stadium: Stadio Ennio Tardini; Attendance: 14,642; Referee: (Italy) Niccoló Baroni

6 April 2024 32	Südtirol	0–0	Parma	Bolzano
14:00 CET (UTC+1)	Arrigoni (yellow card) 52'	Report	Adrián Bernabé (yellow card) 63'; Cyprien (yellow card) 74'	Stadium: Stadio Druso; Attendance: 5,052; Referee: (Italy) Matteo Marchetti

13 April 33	Parma	2–0	Spezia	Parma
16:15 CET (UTC+1)	Bonny (yellow card) 43'; Hernani 45+1'; Circati (yellow card) 67'; Charpentier 87'; Čolak (yellow card) 89'	Report	Falcinelli (yellow card) 45+6'; Pietro Candelari (yellow card) 90'	Stadium: Stadio Ennio Tardini; Attendance: 13,942; Referee: (Italy) Giuseppe Collu

19 April 2024 34	Palermo	0–0	Parma	Palermo
20:30 CET (UTC+1)	Diakité (yellow card) 42'; Gomes (yellow card) 90+4'	Report	Osorio (yellow card) 37'; Adrián Bernabé (yellow card) 78'	Stadium: Stadio Renzo Barbera; Attendance: 21,120; Referee: (Italy) Gianluca Aureliano

27 April 2024 35	Parma	4–0	Lecco	Parma
14:00 CET (UTC+1)	Adrián Bernabé 15' 31'; Mihăilă 23'; Circati (yellow card) 83'; Camara (yellow card) 88' (goal) 88'	Report	Sersanti (yellow card) 58'	Stadium: Stadio Ennio Tardini; Attendance: 16,057; Referee: (Italy) Daniele Rutella

1 May 2024 36	Bari	1–1	Parma	Bari
18:00 CET (UTC+1)	Di Cesare 68'	Report	Coulibaly (yellow card) 6'; Bonny 50'; Estévez (yellow card) 70'	Stadium: Stadio San Nicola; Attendance: 18,347; Referee: (Italy) Antonio Rapuano

5 May 2024 37	Parma	1–1	Cremonese	Parma
15:00 CET (UTC+1)	Balogh (red card) 14'; Man (yellow card) 38'; Mihăilă 56'; Hainaut (yellow card) 64'; Circati (yellow card) 90+4'	Report	Vázquez (yellow card) 7', (goal) 25'; Quagliata (yellow card) 18'; Majer (yellow card) 40'; Pickel (yellow card) 45' (yellow-red card) 70'	Stadium: Stadio Ennio Tardini; Attendance: 19,023; Referee: (Italy) Matteo Gualtieri

10 May 2024 38	Reggiana	1–1	Parma	Reggio Emilia
20:30 CET (UTC+1)	Portanova 26'; Kabashi (yellow card) 48'; Fiamozzi (yellow card) 59'; Cigarini (yellow card) 87'; Vergara (yellow card) 90'	Report	Cyprien (yellow card) 45'; Del Prato (yellow card) 59'; Bonny 61' (pen.)	Stadium: Mapei Stadium – Città del Tricolore; Attendance: 16,121; Referee: (Italy) Davide Ghersini

=== Coppa Italia ===
12 August 2023 Round of 64	Bari	0–3	Parma	Bari
18:00 CEST (UTC+2)		Report	Benedyczak 8'; Bonny 34'; Man 75'	Stadium: Stadio San Nicola; Attendance: 12,635; Referee: Francesco Fourneau

1 November 2023 Round of 32	Lecce	2–4	Parma	Lecce
18:00 CET (UTC+1)	Piccoli 54'; Strefezza (yellow card) 72', (goal) 76'; Berisha (yellow card) 87'	Report	Sohm 9'; Bonny 26'; Mihăilă (yellow card) 33'; Coulibaly (yellow card) 74'; Zagaritis (yellow card) 85'; Pongračić 90+4' (o.g.); Man 90+7' (pen.)	Stadium: Stadio Via del mare Attendance: 6,654; Referee: Daniele Minelli

6 December 2023 Round of 16	Fiorentina	2–2 (a.e.t.) (4–1 p)	Parma	Florence
21:00 CET (UTC+1)	Mina (yellow card) 38'; Nzola 83', (yellow card) 92'; Sottil 90' (pen.); Infantino (yellow card) 120'	Report	Bernabé 21'; Bonny 23'; Chichizola (yellow card) 38'; Ansaldi (yellow card) 96'	Stadium: Stadio Artemio Franchi; Attendance: 23,113; Referee: Livio Marinelli
	Penalties
	Biraghi (penalty scored); Kouamé (penalty scored); Milenković (penalty scored); Beltrán (penalty scored)		(penalty scored) Hernani; (penalty missed) Man; (penalty missed) Camara
