= 2023–24 Cosenza Calcio season =

Cosenza Calcio
2023–24 season
- Manager: Fabio Caserta
- Stadium: Stadio San Vito-Gigi Marulla
- Serie B: 9th
- Coppa Italia: Round of 64
Home colours	Away colours	Third colours

The 2023–24 season was Cosenza Calcio's 110th season in existence and the club's sixth consecutive season in the second division of Italian football. In addition to the domestic league, Cosenza Calcio participated in this season's edition of the Coppa Italia. The season covered the period from 1 July 2023 to 30 June 2024.

== Players ==
=== First-team squad ===
As of 1 September 2023

Note: Flags indicate national team as defined under FIFA eligibility rules; some limited exceptions apply. Players may hold more than one non-FIFA nationality.

No.	Pos.	Nation	Player
1	GK	ITA	Alessandro Micai
2	DF	ITA	Filippo Sgarbi
3	DF	ITA	Andrea Rispoli
6	DF	ITA	Alessandro Fontanarosa (on loan from Inter)
7	MF	ITA	Manuel Marras
9	FW	ITA	Gennaro Tutino (on loan from Parma)
10	FW	ITA	Francesco Forte (on loan from Ascoli)
11	DF	ITA	Tommaso D'Orazio
12	GK	ITA	Alessandro Lai
13	DF	ITA	Andrea Meroni
14	MF	ITA	Giacomo Calò
17	DF	ITA	Baldovino Cimino
19	FW	ITA	Valerio Crespi (on loan from Lazio)
20	FW	ITA	Alessandro Arioli

No.	Pos.	Nation	Player
21	FW	ITA	Massimo Zilli
23	DF	ITA	Michael Venturi
24	MF	ITA	Mattia Viviani (on loan from Benevento)
26	MF	POL	Mateusz Praszelik (on loan from Verona)
27	DF	ITA	Pietro Martino
30	FW	ITA	Simone Mazzocchi (on loan from Atalanta)
31	FW	ITA	Luigi Canotto (on loan from Frosinone)
33	DF	ITA	Salvatore Dario La Vardera
34	MF	ITA	Aldo Florenzi
36	FW	AUS	Jahce Novello
42	MF	KOS	Idriz Voca
77	GK	ITA	Leonardo Marson
98	MF	ITA	Federico Zuccon (on loan from Atalanta)

=== Out on loan ===
Note: Flags indicate national team as defined under FIFA eligibility rules; some limited exceptions apply. Players may hold more than one non-FIFA nationality.

No. / Pos. / Nation / Player; — / DF / BUL / Andrea Hristov (at Potenza until 30 June 2024)	No. / Pos. / Nation / Player; — / MF / ITA / Christian D'Urso (at Triestina until 30 June 2024)

== Competitions ==
=== Overview ===
Competition	First match	Last match	Starting round	Final position	Record							
Competition	First match	Last match	Starting round	Final position	Pld	W	D	L	GF	GA	GD	Win %
Serie B	19 August 2023	10 May 2024	Matchday 1	9th	38	11	14	13	47	42	+5	28.95
Coppa Italia	13 August 2023		Round of 64	Round of 64	1	0	0	1	2	5	−3	0.00
Total					39	11	14	14	49	47	+2	28.21

Source: Competitions

=== Serie B ===
==== League table ====
Pos	Team	Pld	W	D	L	GF	GA	GD	Pts	Promotion, qualification or relegation
7	Sampdoria (Note: Sampdoria were deducted 2 points due to failure in paying taxes between January and March 2023.)	38	16	9	13	53	50	+3	55	Qualification for promotion play-offs preliminary round
8	Brescia	38	12	15	11	44	40	+4	51	Qualification for promotion play-offs preliminary round
9	Cosenza	38	11	14	13	47	42	+5	47 (Note: Head-to-head points: Cosenza 11, Modena 11, Reggiana 7, Südtirol 3. Head-to-head goal difference: Cosenza +6, Modena +2.)	
10	Modena	38	10	17	11	41	47	−6	47	
11	Reggiana	38	10	17	11	38	45	−7	47	

Source: Soccerway (in English)
Rules for classification: 1) Points; 2) Head-to-head points; 3) Head-to-head goal difference; 4) Goal difference; 5) Goals scored; 6) Draw.
(Note: Head-to-head record is used only after all the matches between the teams in question have been played)

==== Results summary ====
Overall								Home						Away					
Pld	W	D	L	GF	GA	GD	Pts	W	D	L	GF	GA	GD	W	D	L	GF	GA	GD
11	4	3	4	14	11	+3	15	2	1	2	10	6	+4	2	2	2	4	5	−1

Last updated: 28 October 2023.
Source: Worldfootball

==== Results by round ====
Round	1	2	3	4	5	6	7	8	9	10	11	12	13	14	15	16	17	18	19	20	21	22	23	24	25	26	27	28	29	30	31	32	33	34
Ground	H	A	H	A	H	A	H	A	H	A	A	H	H	A	H	A	H	A	H	A	H	A	H	A	A	H	A	H	H	A	H	A	H	A
Result	W	D	L	L	D	W	L	W	W	L	D	D	W	L	L	L	D	D	L	L	W	W	D	D	W	L	D	L	D	L	L	D	D	W
Position	1	3	9	12	12	8	11	9	7	7	9	10	8	9	9	11	13	12	14	15	14	11	11	13	11	11	10	14	14	14	15	14	14	

Updated to match(es) played on 19 April 2024. Source: Worldfootball
A = Away; H = Home; W = Win; D = Draw; L = Loss

==== Matches ====
The league fixtures were unveiled on 11 July 2023.

1	v
CEST (UTC+2)

10 May 2024 38	Como	v	Cosenza	Como
20:30				Stadium: Stadio Giuseppe Sinigaglia

=== Coppa Italia ===
13 August 2023 Round of 64	Cosenza	2–5 (a.e.t.)	Sassuolo	Cosenza
18:00 CEST (UTC+2)	Tutino 9' (pen.); Zuccon (yellow card) 45+2'; Calò (yellow card) 71' (yellow-red card) 100'; Mazzocchi 90'; Praszelik (yellow card) 102'	Report	Viti (yellow card) 9'; Erlić (yellow card) 37'; Bajrami 45+4'; Pinamonti 79' (pen.); Volpato (yellow card) 88'; Viña (yellow card) 89'; Lopez (yellow card) 101'; Defrel (yellow card) 101'; Ceide 105'; Mulattieri 115', 118'	Stadium: Stadio San Vito-Gigi Marulla; Attendance: 8,800; Referee: Giuseppe Collu
