= List of Italian football transfers winter 2021–22 =

The 2021–22 Italian football winter transfer window ran from 3 to 31 January 2022. This list includes transfers featuring at least one club from either Serie A or Serie B that were completed after the end of the summer 2021 transfer window on 30 September 2021 and before the end of the winter 2021–22 window on 31 January.

== Transfers ==
Legend

- Those clubs in Italic indicate that the player already left the team on loan on this or the previous season or a new signing that immediately left the club.

Date	Name	Moving from	Moving to	Fee
5 December 2021	Gabriele Corbo	Bologna	(Canada) Montréal	12-month loan
16 December 2021	(Greece) Kostas Manolas	Napoli	(Greece) Olympiacos	Undisclosed
27 December 2021	(Iceland) Brynjar Ingi Bjarnason	Lecce	(Norway) Vålerenga	Undisclosed
3 January 2022	(France) Jonathan Ikoné	(France) Lille	Fiorentina	Undisclosed
3 January 2022	(France) Michaël Cuisance	(Germany) FC Bayern Munich	Venezia	Undisclosed
3 January 2022	(Switzerland) Silvan Hefti	(Switzerland) Young Boys	Genoa	Undisclosed
3 January 2022	Fabio Depaoli	Sampdoria	Verona	Undisclosed
3 January 2022	Matteo Lovato	Atalanta	Cagliari	Undisclosed
4 January 2022	(Argentina) Facundo Colidio	Inter	(Argentina) Tigre	1-year loan
4 January 2022	(Argentina) Gonzalo Escalante	Lazio	(Spain) Alavés	Loan
4 January 2022	Luca Gagliano	Avellino	Cagliari	Loan return
4 January 2022	(Poland) Łukasz Teodorczyk	Udinese	Vicenza	Free
5 January 2022	(Norway) Leo Skiri Østigård	(England) Brighton	Genoa	Loan
6 January 2022	(Brazil) Samir	Udinese	(England) Watford	Undisclosed
6 January 2022	Biagio Meccariello	Lecce	S.P.A.L.	Undisclosed
7 January 2022	(Bosnia and Herzegovina) Mirza Hasanbegovic	Venezia	(Greece) Kallithea	Loan
7 January 2022	(France) Charles Boli	(France) Lens	Vicenza	Loan
8 January 2022	Kelvin Yeboah	(Austria) Sturm Graz	Genoa	Undisclosed
8 January 2022	(England) Ainsley Maitland-Niles	(England) Arsenal	Roma	Loan
8 January 2022	(England) Axel Tuanzebe	(England) Manchester United	Napoli	Loan
8 January 2022	(Spain) Pau López	Roma	(France) OM	Undisclosed (Note: The player already played for his new club in the first part of the season, the deal turned from temporary to definitive.)
8 January 2022	(Poland) Krzysztof Piątek	(Germany) Hertha BSC	Fiorentina	Loan
8 January 2022	(Venezuela) Tomás Rincón	Torino	Sampdoria	Loan
9 January 2022	Paolo Faragò	Cagliari	Lecce	Loan
9 January 2022	(Croatia) Adrian Leon Barišić	(Croatia) Osijek	Frosinone	Loan
10 January 2022	(Netherlands) Alessio Da Cruz	Parma	Vicenza	Loan
10 January 2022	Antony Angileri	Sampdoria	Messina	Loan
10 January 2022	Andrea Conti	Milan	Sampdoria	Undisclosed
11 January 2022	Daniele Liotti	Reggina	Cosenza	Loan
12 January 2022	(Portugal) Sérgio Oliveira	(Portugal) Porto	Roma	Loan
12 January 2022	(Uruguay) Diego Godín	Cagliari	(Brazil) Atlético Mineiro	Free
12 January 2022	Edoardo Goldaniga	Sassuolo	Cagliari	Undisclosed
12 January 2022	Mattia Finotto	Monza	S.P.A.L.	Undisclosed
12 January 2022	(Belgium) Jordan Lukaku	Lazio	Vicenza	Loan
12 January 2022	Francesco Dicorato	Roma	Cosenza	Undisclosed
13 January 2022	(France) Sebastien De Maio	Udinese	Vicenza	Undisclosed
13 January 2022	(Croatia) Filip Benković	(England) Leicester City	Udinese	Free
13 January 2022	(Bulgaria) Andrea Hristov	(Bulgaria) Slavia Sofia	Cosenza	Loan
13 January 2022	Luca Coccolo	Juventus	Alessandria	Loan
13 January 2022	(Spain) Borja Mayoral	Roma	(Spain) Getafe	Loan
13 January 2022	(Spain) Gonzalo Villar	Roma	(Spain) Getafe	Loan
14 January 2022	Riccardo Calafiori	Roma	Genoa	Loan
14 January 2022	Francesco Forte	Venezia	Benevento	Loan
14 January 2022	(Brazil) Diego Farias	Cagliari	Benevento	Free
14 January 2022	(Algeria) Mohamed Farès	Lazio	Torino	Loan
14 January 2022	(Portugal) Nani	(United States) Orlando City	Venezia	Free
14 January 2022	Stefano Sabelli	Genoa	Brescia	Loan
15 January 2022	(Austria) David Schnegg	Venezia	Crotone	Loan
15 January 2022	(Turkey) Mert Çetin	Verona	(Turkey) Kayserispor	Loan
16 January 2022	Giangiacomo Magnani	Verona	Sampdoria	Loan
16 January 2022	(Austria) Maximilian Ullmann	(Austria) Rapid Wien	Venezia	Undisclosed
17 January 2022	Martín Satriano	Inter	(France) Brestois	Loan
17 January 2022	Laurens Serpe	Genoa	Crotone	Loan
17 January 2022	Daniele Ghilardi	Fiorentina	Verona	Loan
17 January 2022	(Poland) Adam Chrzanowski	Pordenone	(Poland) Wisła Płock	Loan
17 January 2022	Umberto Saracco	Cosenza	Fidelis Andria	Undisclosed
17 January 2022	Edoardo Sarri	Juve Stabia	Cosenza	Loan
18 January 2022	Francesco Cassata	Genoa	Parma	Loan
18 January 2022	(Sweden) Robin Olsen	Roma	(England) Aston Villa	Loan
18 January 2022	(Slovenia) Dejan Vokić	Benevento	Pordenone	Loan
18 January 2022	Jacopo Petriccione	Crotone	Benevento	Loan
18 January 2022	Andrea Bianchimano	Perugia	Viterbese	Undisclosed
19 January 2022	Antonino Pio Iervolino	Imolese	Salernitana	Undisclosed
19 January 2022	(Spain) Pablo Marí	(England) Arsenal	Udinese	Loan
19 January 2022	(Ghana) Bright Gyamfi	Unattached	Benevento	Free
19 January 2022	Giuseppe Di Serio	Benevento	Pordenone	Loan
20 January 2022	(Liberia) Mark Pabai	(Netherlands) PEC Zwolle	S.P.A.L.	Undisclosed
20 January 2022	Riccardo Spaltro	S.P.A.L.	Renate	Loan
20 January 2022	(Iceland) Davíd Jóhannsson	(Iceland) Keflavík	Lecce	Undisclosed
20 January 2022	(Spain) Raúl Asencio	Unattached	Lecce	Free
20 January 2022	Leonardo Mancuso	Empoli	Monza	18-month loan
20 January 2022	Kevin Piscopo	Empoli	Renate	Loan
20 January 2022	Pietro Iemmello	Frosinone	Catanzaro	Loan
21 January 2022	Christian Tommasini	Pisa	Paganese	Loan
21 January 2022	(Norway) Emil Ceïde	(Norway) Rosenborg	Sassuolo	Loan
21 January 2022	Riccardo Collodel	Cremonese	Lucchese	Loan
21 January 2022	(Romania) Dennis Politic	(England) Bolton	Cremonese	Undisclosed
21 January 2022	Samuele Damiani	Empoli	Palermo	Loan
22 January 2022	Jacopo Murano	Perugia	Avellino	Undisclosed
22 January 2022	Marco Benassi	Fiorentina	Empoli	Loan
24 January 2022	(Ivory Coast) Jérémie Boga	Sassuolo	Atalanta	Loan
24 January 2022	(Senegal) Khouma Babacar	Sassuolo	(Denmark) Copenhagen	Loan
24 January 2022	Alessandro Russo	Sassuolo	(Belgium) Sint-Truiden	Loan
24 January 2022	Luca Magnino	Pordenone	Modena	Loan
24 January 2022	Ernesto Torregrossa	Sampdoria	Pisa	Loan
24 January 2022	(Slovakia) Denis Vavro	Lazio	(Denmark) Copenhagen	Loan
24 January 2022	Luigi Sepe	Parma	Salernitana	Loan
25 January 2022	(Switzerland) Michel Aebischer	(Switzerland) Young Boys	Bologna	Loan
25 January 2022	(Netherlands) Sydney van Hooijdonk	Bologna	(Netherlands) Heerenveen	Loan
25 January 2022	Roberto Piccoli	Atalanta	Genoa	Loan
25 January 2022	Luca Calapai	Catania	Crotone	Undisclosed
25 January 2022	Pasquale Mazzocchi	Venezia	Salernitana	Loan
25 January 2022	(Greece) Panagiotis Retsos	(Germany) Bayer Leverkusen	Verona	Undisclosed
25 January 2022	Ciro Panico	Cosenza	Juve Stabia	Undisclosed
25 January 2022	Alberto Almici	Palermo	S.P.A.L.	Undisclosed
25 January 2022	Lorenzo Gavioli	Reggina	Renate	Loan
26 January 2022	(Germany) Jeff Chabot	Sampdoria	(Germany) 1. FC Köln	18-month loan
26 January 2022	(Republic of Ireland) James Abankwah	(Republic of Ireland) St Pat's	Udinese	Undisclosed
26 January 2022	(Republic of Ireland) James Abankwah	Udinese	(Republic of Ireland) St Pat's	Loan
26 January 2022	Marco Zunno	Cremonese	Fiorenzuola	Loan
26 January 2022	Fausto Perseu	Cremonese	Olbia	Loan
26 January 2022	(Libya) Ahmad Benali	Crotone	Pisa	Loan
26 January 2022	(Ivory Coast) Ben Lhassine Kone	Torino	Crotone	Loan
26 January 2022	(France) Samuel Noireau-Dauriat	(France) Paris Saint-Germain	S.P.A.L.	Loan
26 January 2022	Andrea Arrighini	Alessandria	Reggiana	Undisclosed
27 January 2022	(Germany) Robin Gosens	Atalanta	Inter	Loan
27 January 2022	Luca Paganini	Lecce	Ascoli	Undisclosed
27 January 2022	Pietro Pellegri	Monaco	Torino	Loan
27 January 2022	Mirko Gori	Frosinone	Alessandria	Loan
27 January 2022	Tommaso Farabegoli	Sampdoria	FeralpiSalò	Loan
27 January 2022	(Belgium) Daan Heymans	Venezia	(Belgium) Charleroi	Loan
27 January 2022	(Serbia) Marko Lazetić	(Serbia) Red Star Belgrade	Milan	Undisclosed
27 January 2022	(Argentina) Tiago Casasola	Lazio	Cremonese	Loan
27 January 2022	Gianluigi Sueva	Cosenza	Potenza	Loan
27 January 2022	Lorenzo Lofaro	Reggina	Paternò	Loan
28 January 2022	Daniele Baselli	Torino	Cagliari	Undisclosed
28 January 2022	(Romania) Răzvan Sava	Torino	(Romania) Cluj	Undisclosed
28 January 2022	Riccardo Ciervo	Roma	Sassuolo	Loan
28 January 2022	Angelo Corsi	Cosenza	Vibonese	Loan
28 January 2022	Michele Cerofolini	Fiorentina	Alessandria	Loan
28 January 2022	(Serbia) Dušan Vlahović	Fiorentina	Juventus	€81.6M
28 January 2022	(Kosovo) Idriz Voca	Unattached	Cosenza	Free
28 January 2022	Moustapha Yabre	Cesena	S.P.A.L.	
28 January 2022	Simone Lozza	Atalanta	Empoli	Loan
28 January 2022	Manuel Marras	Bari	Crotone	Loan
28 January 2022	(Denmark) Andreas Skov Olsen	Bologna	(Belgium) Club Brugge	Undisclosed
28 January 2022	Flavio Bianchi	Genoa	Brescia	Loan
28 January 2022	Simone Verdi	Torino	Salernitana	Loan
29 January 2022	(Ecuador) Felipe Caicedo	Genoa	Inter	Loan
29 January 2022	(Argentina) Federico Fazio	Roma	Salernitana	Free
29 January 2022	Michele Cavion	Salernitana	Vicenza	Loan
29 January 2022	Alessandro Di Pardo	Juventus	Cosenza	Loan
29 January 2022	Marco Olivieri	Juventus	Perugia	18-month loan
29 January 2022	Alessandro Plizzari	Milan	Lecce	Loan
29 January 2022	Gianmarco Cangiano	Bologna	Crotone	Loan
29 January 2022	(Brazil) Arthur Cabral	(Switzerland) Basel	Fiorentina	Undisclosed
29 January 2022	(Germany) Nadiem Amiri	(Germany) Bayer Leverkusen	Genoa	Loan
29 January 2022	(Poland) Mateusz Praszelik	(Poland) Śląsk Wrocław	Verona	1-year loan
29 January 2022	Antonino Ragusa	Verona	Lecce	Undisclosed
29 January 2022	Niccolò Zanellato	Crotone	S.P.A.L.	Undisclosed
29 January 2022	Enrico Alfonso	Cremonese	S.P.A.L.	Undisclosed
29 January 2022	Valerio Verre	Sampdoria	Empoli	Loan
29 January 2022	Stefano Sensi	Inter	Sampdoria	Loan
29 January 2022	(Morocco) Abdelhamid Sabiri	Ascoli	Sampdoria	Loan
29 January 2022	(Slovenia) Nik Prelec	Sampdoria	(Slovenia) Olimpija Ljubljana	Loan
29 January 2022	Raffaele Maiello	Frosinone	Bari	Loan
30 January 2022	(Ukraine) Vladyslav Supryaha	(Ukraine) Dynamo Kyiv	Sampdoria	Loan
30 January 2022	(Netherlands) Bobby Adekanye	Lazio	Crotone	Loan
30 January 2022	(Spain) Jony	Lazio	(Spain) Sporting Gijón	Loan
30 January 2022	(Netherlands) Wessel Been	(Netherlands) PEC Zwolle	Lecce	Undisclosed
30 January 2022	Simone Sini	Alessandria	Renate	Loan
30 January 2022	(Poland) Iwo Kaczmarski	(Poland) Raków	Empoli	Loan
30 January 2022	Samuele Ricci	Empoli	Torino	Loan
30 January 2022	(Uruguay) Martín Cáceres	Cagliari	(Spain) Levante	Undisclosed
30 January 2022	(Netherlands) Mohamed Ihattaren	Juventus	(Netherlands) Ajax	1-year loan
30 January 2022	(Ivory Coast) Cedric Gondo	Salernitana	Cremonese	Undisclosed
30 January 2022	(Brazil) Éderson	(Brazil) Corinthians	Salernitana	Undisclosed
30 January 2022	(Netherlands) Denso Kasius	(Netherlands) Utrecht	Bologna	Undisclosed
30 January 2022	(Denmark) Morten Frendrup	(Denmark) Brøndby	Genoa	Undisclosed
30 January 2022	(Gabon) Anthony Oyono	(France) Boulogne	Frosinone	Undisclosed
31 January 2022	(Norway) Emil Bohinen	(Russia) CSKA Moscow	Salernitana	Loan
31 January 2022	(Serbia) Ivan Radovanović	Genoa	Salernitana	Free
31 January 2022	(Romania) Radu Drăgușin	Juventus	Salernitana	Loan
31 January 2022	(France) Lys Mousset	(England) Sheffield United	Salernitana	Loan
31 January 2022	(Brazil) Mikael	(Brazil) Sport Recife	Salernitana	Loan
31 January 2022	(Croatia) Luka Bogdan	Salernitana	Ternana	Loan
31 January 2022	Luca Moro	Padova	Sassuolo	Undisclosed
31 January 2022	Luca Moro	Sassuolo	Catania	Loan
31 January 2022	(New Zealand) Liberato Cacace	(Belgium) Sint-Truiden	Empoli	Loan
31 January 2022	(Switzerland) Denis Zakaria	(Germany) Borussia Mönchengladbach	Juventus	€8.6M
31 January 2022	Federico Gatti	Frosinone	Juventus	Undisclosed
31 January 2022	Federico Gatti	Juventus	Frosinone	Loan
31 January 2022	(Wales) Aaron Ramsey	Juventus	(Scotland) Rangers	Loan
31 January 2022	(Sweden) Dejan Kulusevski	Juventus	(England) Tottenham	Loan
31 January 2022	(Uruguay) Rodrigo Bentancur	Juventus	(England) Tottenham	€25M
31 January 2022	Riccardo Ladinetti	Cagliari	Cagliari	Loan
31 January 2022	(Angola) Zito Luvumbo	Como	Cagliari	Loan return
31 January 2022	(Cape Verde) Jovane Cabral	(Portugal) Sporting	Lazio	Loan
31 January 2022	(Serbia) Dimitrije Kamenović	(Serbia) Čukarički	Lazio	Undisclosed
31 January 2022	(Denmark) Riza Durmisi	Lazio	(Netherlands) Sparta Rotterdam	Loan
31 January 2022	(Romania) Valentin Mihăilă	Parma	Atalanta	Loan
31 January 2022	Federico Mattiello	Atalanta	Alessandria	Loan
31 January 2022	(Tunisia) Hamza Rafia	Juventus	Cremonese	Loan
31 January 2022	Matteo Ghisolfi	Cremonese	Fiorenzuola	Loan
31 January 2022	Filippo Nardi	Cremonese	Como	Loan
31 January 2022	Emanuele Ndoj	Brescia	Cosenza	Loan
31 January 2022	Davide Adorni	Cittadella	Brescia	Undisclosed
31 January 2022	Federico Proia	Vicenza	Brescia	Loan
31 January 2022	Lorenzo Andrenacci	Genoa	Brescia	Loan
31 January 2022	(Switzerland) Valon Behrami	Genoa	Brescia	Free
31 January 2022	(North Macedonia) Goran Pandev	Genoa	Parma	Undisclosed
31 January 2022	(Netherlands) Jayden Oosterwolde	(Netherlands) Twente	Parma	Loan
31 January 2022	(Nigeria) Simy	Salernitana	Parma	Loan
31 January 2022	(France) Antoine Hainaut	(France) Boulogne	Parma	Undisclosed
31 January 2022	(France) Antoine Hainaut	Parma	(France) Boulogne	Loan
31 January 2022	(Romania) George Pușcaș	(England) Reading	Pisa	Loan
31 January 2022	Davide De Marino	Juventus	Pisa	Loan
31 January 2022	Gabriele Piccinini	Pisa	Fiorenzuola	Loan
31 January 2022	Alessandro Quaini	Pisa	Monopoli	Loan
31 January 2022	Luigi Cuppone	Cittadella	Potenza	Loan
31 January 2022	Christian D'Urso	Cittadella	Perugia	Undisclosed
31 January 2022	Dario Del Fabro	Juventus	Cittadella	Undisclosed
31 January 2022	(Argentina) Santiago Visentin	Crotone	Cittadella	Undisclosed
31 January 2022	Brian Oddei	Crotone	Sassuolo	Loan return
31 January 2022	(The Gambia) Musa Juwara	Crotone	Bologna	Loan return
31 January 2022	(Chile) Luis Rojas	Crotone	Bologna	Loan
31 January 2022	Manuel Nicoletti	Foggia	Crotone	Undisclosed
31 January 2022	(Serbia) Vladimir Golemić	(Greece) Lamia	Crotone	Undisclosed
31 January 2022	(Tunisia) Karim Laribi	Reggina	Cittadella	Loan
31 January 2022	(Senegal) Demba Seck	S.P.A.L.	Torino	Undisclosed
31 January 2022	(France) Gaëtan Laura	(France) Paris	Cosenza	Loan
31 January 2022	(Netherlands) Rodney Kongolo	(Netherlands) Heerenveen	Cosenza	Undisclosed
31 January 2022	(Iceland) Albert Guðmundsson	(Netherlands) AZ Alkmaar	Genoa	Undisclosed
31 January 2022	(Germany) Lennart Czyborra	(Germany) Arminia Bielefeld	Genoa	Loan return
31 January 2022	(Ukraine) Nikita Contini	Napoli	Vicenza	Loan
31 January 2022	Jean Freddi Greco	Pordenone	Vicenza	Undisclosed
31 January 2022	Jean Freddi Greco	Vicenza	Catania	Loan
31 January 2022	Simone Pontisso	Vicenza	Pescara	Undisclosed
31 January 2022	Semuel Pizzignacco	Vicenza	Renate	Loan
31 January 2022	Samuele Longo	Vicenza	Modena	Loan
31 January 2022	(Kosovo) Vedat Muriqi	Lazio	(Spain) Mallorca	Loan
31 January 2022	(Netherlands) Djavan Anderson	Lazio	(Netherlands) PEC Zwolle	Loan
31 January 2022	Leonardo Candellone	Napoli	Pordenone	18-month loan
31 January 2022	Cristian Andreoni	Bari	Pordenone	Loan
31 January 2022	Gianvito Misuraca	Pordenone	Bari	Loan
31 January 2022	(Poland) Tomasz Kupisz	Pordenone	Reggina	Loan
31 January 2022	Cristiano Lombardi	Lazio	Reggina	Loan
31 January 2022	Michael Folorunsho	Napoli	Reggina	Loan
31 January 2022	Federico Ricci	Reggina	Ascoli	Loan
31 January 2022	Andrea Seculin	S.P.A.L.	Pistoiese	Undisclosed
31 January 2022	(Romania) Luca Mihai	Bologna	S.P.A.L.	Undisclosed
31 January 2022	Luca Vido	Atalanta	S.P.A.L.	Loan
31 January 2022	Marco Pinato	Sassuolo	S.P.A.L.	Loan
31 January 2022	Luca Crescenzi	Como	Siena	Undisclosed
31 January 2022	(Morocco) Ismail H'Maidat	Como	Südtirol	Loan
31 January 2022	Andrea Beghetto	Pisa	Perugia	Loan
31 January 2022	Samuele Righetti	Perugia	Gubbio	Loan
31 January 2022	(The Gambia) Kalifa Manneh	Perugia	Taranto	Loan
31 January 2022	(Cameroon) Jean-Pierre Nsame	(Switzerland) Young Boys	Venezia	Loan
31 January 2022	(Finland) Lauri Ala-Myllymäki	Venezia	Triestina	Loan
31 January 2022	(Scotland) Harvey St Clair	Venezia	Triestina	Loan
31 January 2022	Gianmarco Zigoni	Venezia	Virtus Verona	Undisclosed
31 January 2022	Jacopo Dezi	Venezia	Padova	Undisclosed
31 January 2022	Mirko Bruccini	Alessandria	Mantova	Undisclosed
31 January 2022	Matteo Gerace	Alessandria	Fiorenzuola	Undisclosed
31 January 2022	Diego Fabbrini	Ascoli	Alessandria	Loan
31 January 2022	(Finland) Adam Markhiyev	(Latvia) Spartaks Jūrmala	S.P.A.L.	Loan
1 February 2022	(Argentina) Diego Perotti	Unattached	Salernitana	Loan
