= Gianluca Frabotta =

Italian footballer (born 1999)

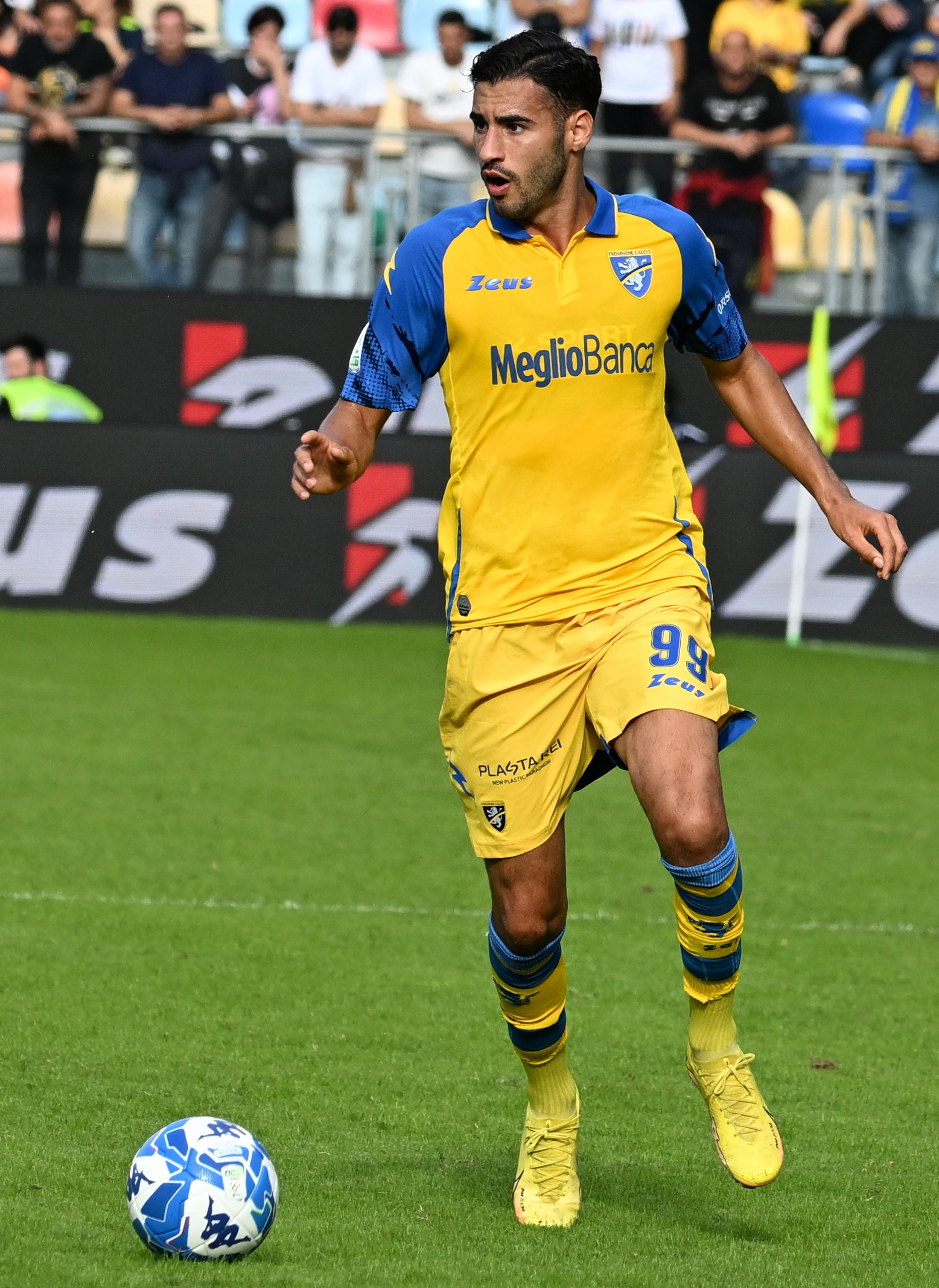
- Frabotta with Frosinone in 2022

Personal information
- Date of birth: 24 June 1999 (age 27)
- Place of birth: Rome, Italy
- Height: 1.87 m (6 ft 2 in)
- Position: Left-back

Team information
- Current team: Cesena
- Number: 99

Youth career
- 2004–2012: Consalvo
- 2012–2015: Savio
- 2015–2018: Bologna

Senior career*
Years	Team	Apps	(Gls)
2017–2019	Bologna	0	(0)
2018–2019	→ Renate (loan)	12	(0)
2019	→ Pordenone (loan)	7	(0)
2019–2024	Juventus	16	(1)
2019–2020	Juventus U23	18	(0)
2021–2022	→ Hellas Verona (loan)	2	(0)
2022	→ Lecce (loan)	0	(0)
2022–2023	→ Frosinone (loan)	22	(0)
2023–2024	→ Bari (loan)	7	(0)
2024	→ Cosenza (loan)	15	(3)
2024–2025	West Bromwich Albion	6	(0)
2025–	Cesena	29	(4)

International career^{‡}
2017	Italy U18	4	(0)
2017	Italy U19	3	(0)
2019	Italy U20	5	(2)
2020–2021	Italy U21	4	(0)
- * Club domestic league appearances and goals as of 13 May 2026 ‡ National team caps and goals as of 27 March 2021

Gianluca Frabotta (born 24 June 1999) is an Italian professional footballer who plays as a left-back for Serie B club Cesena.

Coming through the youth system, Frabotta began his career at Bologna, who loaned him to Renate in 2018 and Pordenone in 2019. He joined Juventus in 2019, playing for their second team Juventus U23, before being made part of the first team in 2020.

Frabotta had represented Italy at youth level since 2017.

== Club career ==
=== Bologna ===
Frabotta received a few call-ups to the bench in Bologna's in Serie A games for the 2016–17 and 2017–18 seasons; however, did not make any appearances for the side.

==== Loan to Renate ====
On 21 June 2018, Frabotta was signed by Serie C side Renate on a season-long loan deal. On 29 July he made his debut for Renate as a substitute replacing Giacomo Caccin in the 63rd minute of a 2–0 home defeat against Rezzato in the first round of Coppa Italia. On 16 September he made his Serie C debut as a starter in a 2–0 away win over Sambenedettese, he was replaced by Lorenzo Saporetti in the 72nd minute. One week later he played his first entire match for Renate, a 2–1 away defeat against Pordenone. In January 2019, Frabotta was re-called to Bologna leaving Renate with 13 appearances and 2 assists.

==== Loan to Pordenone ====
On 11 January 2019, Frabotta was loaned to Serie C club Pordenone on a 6-month loan deal. On 26 January he made his debut for the club as a substitute replacing Michele De Agostini in the 69th minute of a 2–1 home defeat against Rimini. On 24 May he played his first entire match for the club, a 1–1 away draw against Ternana. Frabotta ended his 6-month loan to Pordenone with 7 appearances, including only 2 as a starter.

=== Juventus ===
On 6 August 2019, Frabotta joined Serie C club Juventus U23. He made his professional senior debut for Juventus, as well as his Serie A debut, on 1 August 2020, in a 3–1 home defeat to Roma. On 20 September, in Juventus's opening match of the 2020–21 season, Frabotta played as a starter against Sampdoria; Juventus won 3–0 at home. On 4 November, he made his UEFA Champions League debut, coming on as a second–half substitute for Juan Cuadrado in a 4–1 away win over Ferencváros in the group stage. Frabotta scored his first goal for Juventus on 27 January 2021, scoring his team's second goal in a 4–0 Coppa Italia win over SPAL in the quarter-finals.

==== Loan to Verona ====
On 30 July 2021, Frabotta moved to Hellas Verona on loan.

==== Loans to Lecce and Frosinone ====
On 27 June 2022, Frabotta was loaned to Lecce. Frabotta remained on the bench for Lecce in the first four games of the 2022–23 Serie A season. On 1 September 2022, he moved on a new loan to Frosinone with the consent of Lecce and Juventus.

==== Loans to Bari and Cosenza ====
On 27 August 2023, Frabotta joined Bari in Serie B on loan. On 11 January 2024, after making just seven appearances for the club, Frabotta left Bari and joined fellow Serie B side Cosenza on loan until the end of the season.

=== West Bromwich Albion ===
On 6 August 2024, Frabotta was announced as a new signing for English club West Bromwich Albion. On 10 August, he made his debut for the club, as a substitute, in a 3–1 away win against QPR in the opening league game. On 8 August 2025, Frabotta left the club by mutual consent, having made a total of 7 appearances in his time at the club.

=== Cesena ===
On 12 August 2025, Frabotta signed a one-season contract with Serie B club Cesena.

== International career ==
Frabotta represented Italy at under-18, under-19, and under-21 levels. On 8 February 2017 he made his U18 debut in a 1–1 away draw against France; he was replaced by Luca Ranieri after 83 minutes. On 9 August 2017, Frabotta made his U19 debut as a substitute replacing Alessandro Tripaldelli in the 67th minute of a 2–0 away win over Croatia.

On 13 October 2020, he made his debut with Italy U21 playing as a starter in a 2021 UEFA European Championship qualification match against the Republic of Ireland, which ended in a 2–0 win.

== Career statistics ==
=== Club ===
As of match played 1 January 2025

Appearances and goals by club, season and competition
Club	Season	League			National cup (Note: Includes Coppa Italia, FA Cup)		League cup (Note: Includes EFL Cup)		Continental		Other		Total	
Club	Season	Division	Apps	Goals	Apps	Goals	Apps	Goals	Apps	Goals	Apps	Goals	Apps	Goals
Renate (loan)	2018–19	Serie C	12	0	1	0	—		—		1 (Note: Appearance(s) in Coppa Italia Serie C)	0	14	0
Pordenone (loan)	2018–19	Serie C	5	0	—		—		—		2 (Note: Appearance(s) in Supercoppa di Serie C)	0	7	0
Juventus U23 (res.)	2019–20	Serie C	18	0	—		—		—		8 (Note: Six appearances in Coppa Italia Serie C, two appearances one goal in Serie C promotion play-offs)	1	26	1
Juventus	2019–20	Serie A	1	0	—		—		—		—		1	0
Juventus	2020–21	Serie A	15	0	1	1	—		1 (Note: Appearance(s) in UEFA Champions League)	0	0	0	17	1
Juventus	Total		16	0	1	1	—		1	0	0	0	18	1
Hellas Verona (loan)	2021–22	Serie A	2	0	0	0	—		—		—		2	0
Frosinone (loan)	2022–23	Serie B	22	0	0	0	—		—		—		22	0
Bari (loan)	2023–24	Serie B	7	0	0	0	—		—		—		7	0
Cosenza (loan)	2023–24	Serie B	15	3	0	0	—		—		—		15	3
West Bromwich Albion	2024-25	Championship	6	0	1	0	1	0	—		—		8	0
Career total			104	3	3	1	1	0	1	0	11	1	120	5

== Honours ==
Pordenone

- Serie C Group B: 2018–19
- Supercoppa di Serie C: 2019

Juventus U23

- Coppa Italia Serie C: 2019–20

Juventus

- Serie A: 2019–20
- Coppa Italia: 2020–21
- Supercoppa Italiana: 2020
