= Alessandro Micai =

Italian footballer (born 1993)

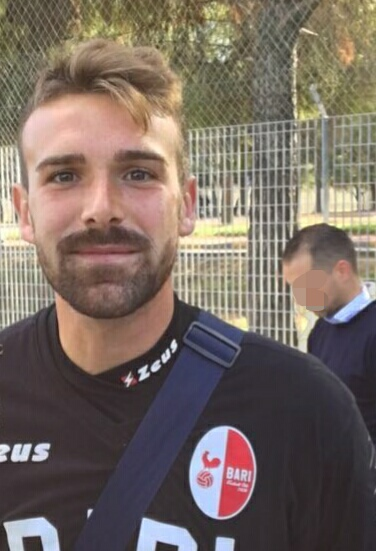
- Micai in 2017

Personal information
- Date of birth: 24 July 1993 (age 33)
- Place of birth: Quistello, Italy
- Height: 1.86 m (6 ft 1 in)
- Position: Goalkeeper

Team information
- Current team: Spezia
- Number: 1

Youth career
- –2010: Mantova
- 2010–2011: Varese
- 2011–2012: Palermo

Senior career*
| Years | Team | Apps | (Gls) |
| 2012–2013 | Palermo | 0 | (0) |
| 2012–2013 | → Como (loan) | 14 | (0) |
| 2013–2014 | Südtirol | 18 | (0) |
| 2014–2018 | Bari | 99 | (0) |
| 2018–2023 | Salernitana | 70 | (0) |
| 2021–2022 | → Reggina (loan) | 16 | (0) |
| 2023–2025 | Cosenza | 93 | (0) |
| 2025–2026 | CFR Cluj | 2 | (0) |
| 2026 | Reggiana | 15 | (0) |
| 2026– | Spezia | 2 | (0) |
- * Club domestic league appearances and goals as of 29 August 2026

Alessandro Micai (born 24 July 1993) is an Italian professional footballer who plays as a goalkeeper for Serie C Group B club Spezia.

== Club career ==
=== Youth career ===
Micai was born in Quistello, near Mantua, in 1993, and began his football career with his local club, Mantova. As a 15-year-old, he played twice in the Campionato Nazionale Primavera for Mantova's under-20 team, but when the club folded in 2010, Micai was released. He moved on to Varese, where again he played for the Primavera team. He came into the side on the sixth matchday and kept his place as coach Devis Mangia led the team to the final stages of the 2010–11 competition. In an eventful semi-final, Varese went into extra time with a two-man disadvantage, having had two players sent off during normal time, had a third player dismissed with 23 minutes still to go, and despite having only eight men against opponents Fiorentina's eleven, held out to take the match into a penalty shootout which they won 7–6. In the final, they came within 15 seconds of beating Roma, only to lose in extra time.

At the end of that season, Mangia followed technical director Sean Sogliano to Palermo to coach their Primavera team, and Micai followed Mangia on a free transfer to play in it. He was voted best goalkeeper of the 2011–12 Campionato Primavera, despite being sent off for over-reacting to Inter's opening goal in the quarter-finals as Palermo were eliminated.

=== Senior career ===
Amid interest reported from Serie B teams, Palermo loaned the 19-year-old Micai to Lega Pro Prima Divisione (third-tier) club Como for 2012–13. Mangia, by then coach of the Italy's under-21 team, felt that this would be a critical season for the player, one in which he needed to add self-control to his technical abilities. He missed the first four matches of Como's season serving a suspension for the sending-off against Inter, and then replaced Filippo Perucchini in the starting eleven to make his senior debut on 7 October 2012 in a 2–2 draw at home to Lecce. He remained in the starting eleven for the first half of the season, and Perucchini regained the position for the second half, with Micai on the bench; he played 14 matches in league competition.

For 2013–14, Lega Pro club Südtirol acquired Micai's playing rights in a co-ownership deal with Palermo. He appeared in 18 league matches and 2 in the Coppa Italia, mostly in the first half of the season, then after an incident in a match away to Reggiana when he was sent off for making provocative gestures to the crowd, he lost his place to the experienced Davide Facchin, newly arrived on loan from Pavia.

In July 2014, Mangia was appointed manager of Serie B club Bari. Later that month, he signed Micai as backup to Enrico Guarna and Antonio Donnarumma. Although Mangia's tenure lasted only a few months, Micai remained, and made his first-team debut in the penultimate match of the season, in a 3–2 win at home to Brescia. After good performances in that and the following match, Bari took up their option to extend Micai's contract until 2017, and he began the new campaign as second-choice goalkeeper behind Guarna. In February 2016, Guarna was sent off late in a match against Crotone, with Bari 2–1 ahead but having used all their substitutes. Outfielder Riccardo Maniero went in goal, but was unable to save the ensuing penalty or keep out a stoppage-time winner.

Guarna was suspended for the next match, so Micai came into the side and saved a first-half penalty as Bari secured a draw away to Avellino. He kept his place – and a clean sheet – in the next fixture, against Latina, and continued as first choice for the remainder of the season, as Bari finished fifth and qualified for the play-offs. In the preliminary round, they recovered from 3–0 down at home to eighth-placed Novara to force extra time. If the scores remained level, the higher-placed team would qualify, but although Novara had a man sent off and Micai produced a triple save to foil Federico Casarini (twice) and Andrey Galabinov, the latter scored with a header with six minutes left and Bari were eliminated.

On 2 August 2018, following the bankruptcy of Bari, he joined Serie B club Salernitana on a 5-year contract.

On 13 July 2021, he joined Reggina on a season-long loan, with an option to buy and a conditional obligation to buy.

On 2 January 2023, Micai signed with Cosenza in Serie B until the end of the 2022–23 season.

After two seasons with Cosenza, he moved abroad for the first time, joining the Romanian Liga I club CFR Cluj in 2025.

== Career statistics ==
As of match played 10 February 2026

Appearances and goals by club, season and competition
| Club | Season | League | | | National cup (Note: Includes Coppa Italia Lega Pro, Coppa Italia) | | Continental | | Other | | Total | |
| Club | Season | Division | Apps | Goals | Apps | Goals | Apps | Goals | Apps | Goals | Apps | Goals |
|---|---|---|---|---|---|---|---|---|---|---|---|---|
| Como (loan) | 2012–13 | Lega Pro Prima Divisione | 14 | 0 | 2 | 0 | — | | — | | 16 | 0 |
| Südtirol | 2013–14 | Lega Pro Prima Divisione | 18 | 0 | 2 | 0 | — | | 0 | 0 | 20 | 0 |
| Bari | 2014–15 | Serie B | 2 | 0 | 0 | 0 | — | | — | | 2 | 0 |
| Bari | 2015–16 | Serie B | 17 | 0 | 0 | 0 | — | | 1 (Note: Appearances in Serie B promotion play-offs) | 0 | 18 | 0 |
| Bari | 2016–17 | Serie B | 39 | 0 | 2 | 0 | — | | — | | 41 | 0 |
| Bari | 2017–18 | Serie B | 41 | 0 | 2 | 0 | — | | 1 | 0 | 44 | 0 |
| Bari | Total | | 99 | 0 | 4 | 0 | — | | 2 | 0 | 105 | 0 |
| Salernitana | 2018–19 | Serie B | 36 | 0 | 2 | 0 | — | | 2 (Note: Appearances in Serie B relegation play-outs) | 0 | 40 | 0 |
| Salernitana | 2019–20 | Serie B | 34 | 0 | 2 | 0 | — | | — | | 36 | 0 |
| Salernitana | 2020–21 | Serie B | 0 | 0 | 0 | 0 | — | | — | | 41 | 0 |
| Salernitana | 2022–23 | Serie A | 0 | 0 | 0 | 0 | — | | — | | 44 | 0 |
| Salernitana | Total | | 70 | 0 | 4 | 0 | — | | 2 | 0 | 76 | 0 |
| Reggina (loan) | 2021–22 | Serie B | 16 | 0 | 1 | 0 | — | | — | | 17 | 0 |
| Cosenza | 2022–23 | Serie B | 19 | 0 | — | | — | | 2 | 0 | 21 | 0 |
| Cosenza | 2023–24 | Serie B | 37 | 0 | 1 | 0 | — | | — | | 38 | 0 |
| Cosenza | 2024–25 | Serie B | 37 | 0 | 1 | 0 | — | | — | | 38 | 0 |
| Cosenza | Total | | 93 | 0 | 2 | 0 | — | | 2 | 0 | 97 | 0 |
| CFR Cluj | 2025–26 | Liga I | 2 | 0 | 0 | 0 | 0 | 0 | — | | 2 | 0 |
| Reggiana | 2025–26 | Serie B | 1 | 0 | — | | — | | — | | 1 | 0 |
| Career total | | | 313 | 0 | 15 | 0 | 0 | 0 | 6 | 0 | 334 | 0 |
