= SS Barletta 1922 =

Italian football club

Barletta
- Full name: Società Sportiva Barletta 1922
- Nicknames: Biancorossi (Red and whites); Furie Rosse (Red Fury)
- Founded: 1922; 1995 (refounded); 2015 (refounded as SS Barletta 1912)
- Ground: Stadio Cosimo Puttilli, Barletta, Italy
- Capacity: 10,000
- Chairman: Marco Arturo Romano
- Manager: Massimo Paci
- League: Serie C Group C
- 2025–26: Serie D Group H, 1st of 18 (promoted)
Home colours	Away colours	Third colours

S.S. Barletta 1922 is an Italian association football club located in Barletta, Apulia. The club competes in Serie C, the third tier of Italian football, following promotion from Serie D in the 2025–26 season.

Barletta played in the professional league as Società Sportiva Barletta Calcio. In 2015, the club went bankrupt, and a new phoenix club, A.S.D. Barletta 1922, was admitted to the 2015–16 Eccellenza on 6 August.

== History ==
The first club was founded in 1922.

At the pinnacle of the club's success, they were promoted to Serie B in the 1987–88 season and remained there until the 1990–91 season.

In the 2007–08 season in Serie D, Barletta finished 2nd in Girone H, qualifying them for the promotional play-offs. They qualified as one of the nine teams in the group stage of the playoffs, but finished second in their group and did not advance to the semi-finals. Ranked as the best second-placed team in the three groups, it won special promotion to Lega Pro Seconda Divisione, one of the five top teams in the promotional play-offs.

== Colours and badge ==
Their official colours are white and red, giving the club the nickname "i biancorossi".

== Players ==
=== Current squad ===
As of 31 August 2026

Note: Flags indicate national team as defined under FIFA eligibility rules; some limited exceptions apply. Players may hold more than one non-FIFA nationality.

No.	Pos.	Nation	Player
1	GK	CRO	Kristjan Matošević
4	DF	ITA	Nicola Bizzotto
5	DF	ITA	Stefano Rossoni
6	DF	ITA	Marco Manetta
7	FW	ITA	Fabio Laringe
8	MF	ITA	Roberto Malfitano (on loan from Cagliari)
9	FW	ITA	Alexis Ferrante
10	FW	ITA	Anthony Partipilo
11	FW	CAN	Easton Ongaro
12	GK	BRA	Gabriel Fernandes
14	DF	ITA	Vincenzo Ragone
16	MF	ITA	Domenico Franco
17	FW	ITA	Donato Distratto

No.	Pos.	Nation	Player
19	FW	BRA	Mateus da Silva
20	MF	ITA	Michele Dicuonzo
22	GK	ITA	Antonio Figliola
24	DF	ITA	Lorenzo Ferrari
27	FW	ITA	Claudio Giardino
33	DF	ITA	Saverio Domanico
42	MF	KOS	Idriz Voca
44	MF	ITA	Savio Piarulli
70	DF	ITA	Giuseppe Coccia
72	DF	ITA	Antonello Vona
77	DF	ITA	Matteo Marini
80	FW	ITA	Gabriel Adragna
82	MF	TOG	Halid Djankpata

== Gallery ==
Logos of Barletta
2005–2008

circa 2008–15
