= Gabriel Charpentier =

Congolese footballer (born 1999)

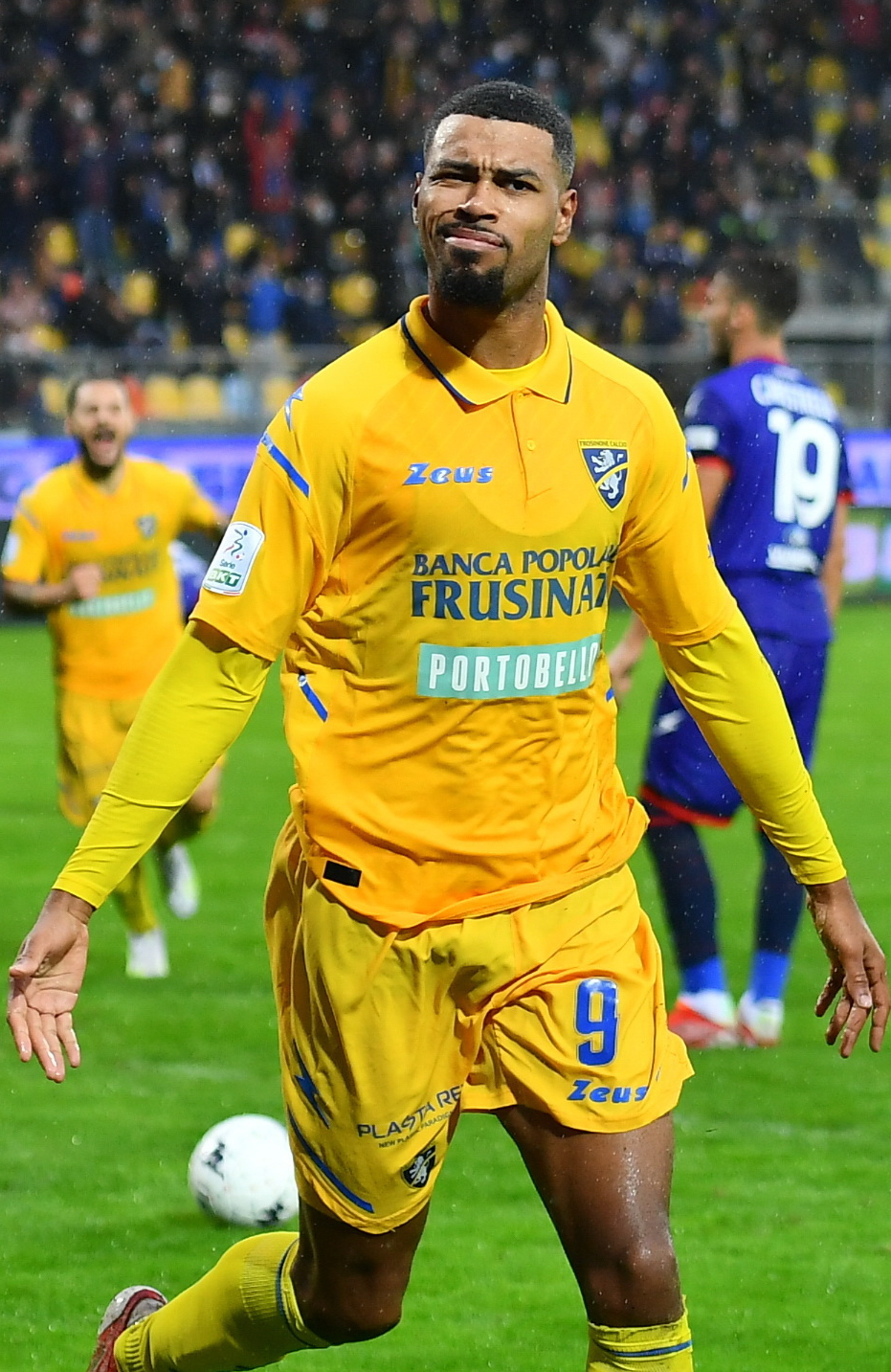
- Charpentier with Frosinone in 2021

Personal information
- Full name: Gabriel André Joseph Charpentier
- Date of birth: 17 May 1999 (age 27)
- Place of birth: Pointe Noire, Republic of the Congo
- Height: 1.88 m (6 ft 2 in)
- Position: Forward

Team information
- Current team: Argeș Pitești
- Number: 9

Youth career
- 2010–2013: CA L'Haÿ les Roses
- 2013–2014: CSA Kremlin-Bicêtre
- 2014–2017: Issy-les-Moulineaux
- 2017–2019: Nantes

Senior career*
Years	Team	Apps	(Gls)
2018–2019	Nantes B	0	(0)
2019–2020	Spartaks Jūrmala	19	(5)
2019–2020	→ Avellino (loan)	15	(6)
2020–2022	Genoa	0	(0)
2020–2021	→ Reggina (loan)	1	(0)
2021	→ Ascoli (loan)	1	(0)
2021–2022	→ Frosinone (loan)	22	(10)
2022–2025	Parma	42	(5)
2025–2026	Cracovia	7	(2)
2025	Cracovia II	1	(1)
2026–	Argeș Pitești	5	(0)

International career^{‡}
2023	Congo	3	(1)
- * Club domestic league appearances and goals as of 24 October 2026 ‡ National team caps and goals as of 17 November 2023

Gabriel André Joseph Charpentier (born 17 May 1999) is a Congolese professional footballer who plays as a forward for Liga I club Argeș Pitești.

== Career ==
After being released from French top flight club Nantes, Charpentier decided to seek a move abroad because he thought "that in France, the path is a little more difficult to get there. Football is not easy".

For the 2019 season, he signed for Spartaks Jūrmala in Latvia, despite being "really apprehensive at the start". Later that season, another French player joined the team, which boosted his confidence and motivation.

In 2020, Charpentier signed for Genoa in the Italian Serie A, before being loaned to Reggina in the Serie B.

On 1 February 2021, Charpentier moved to Serie B side Ascoli, on a loan deal until the end of the season.

On 28 July 2021 he went to Frosinone on loan. He had a great season with Frosinone, scoring ten goals in the league.

On 30 August 2022, Charpentier signed with Parma. In 2024, he won the Serie B and automatic promotion to Serie A with his team.

On 8 September 2025, Charpentier permanently joined Polish Ekstraklasa club Cracovia on a season-long contract, with a one-year extension option.

== International career ==
Charpentier was born in the Republic of the Congo to a French father and Congolese mother. He made himself available to play for the Congo national team in June 2022. He debuted for the Congo in a 2–1 2023 Africa Cup of Nations qualification loss to South Sudan on 23 March 2023.

== Career statistics ==
=== Club ===
As of match played 28 October 2026

Club	Season	League			National cup (Note: Includes Latvian Cup, Coppa Italia Serie C, Coppa Italia, Cupa României)		Europe		Other		Total	
Club	Season	Division	Apps	Goals	Apps	Goals	Apps	Goals	Apps	Goals	Apps	Goals
Nantes B	2018–19	Championnat National 2	0	0	–		–		–		0	0
Spartaks Jūrmala	2019	Latvian Higher League	19	5	1	0	–		–		20	5
Avellino (loan)	2019–20	Serie C	15	6	2	0	–		0	0	17	6
Genoa	2020–21	Serie A	0	0	–		–		–		0	0
Reggina (loan)	2019–20	Serie B	1	0	0	0	–		–		1	0
Ascoli (loan)	2019–20	Serie B	1	0	–		–		–		1	0
Frosinone (loan)	2021–22	Serie B	22	10	0	0	–		–		22	10
Parma	2022–23	Serie B	8	0	1	0	–		0	0	9	0
Parma	2023–24	Serie B	24	4	2	0	–		–		26	4
Parma	2024–25	Serie A	10	1	0	0	–		–		10	1
Parma	2025–26	Serie A	0	0	0	0	–		–		0	0
Parma	Total		42	5	3	0	–		–		45	5
Cracovia	2025–26	Ekstraklasa	7	2	0	0	–		–		7	2
Cracovia II	2025–26	III liga	1	1	–		–		–		1	1
Argeș Pitești	2026–27	Liga I	5	0	2	1	–		–		7	1
Career total			113	19	8	1	–		0	0	121	20

=== International ===
As of match played 17 November 2023

Appearances and goals by national team and year
National team	Year	Apps	Goals
Congo
Congo	2023	3	1
Total		3	1

Scores and results list Congo's goal tally first, score column indicates score after each Charpentier goal.

List of international goals scored by Gabriel Charpentier
No.	Date	Venue	Opponent	Score	Result	Competition
1	27 March 2023	Benjamin Mkapa Stadium, Dar es Salaam, Tanzania	South Sudan	1–0	1–0	2023 Africa Cup of Nations qualification

== Honours ==
Parma

- Serie B: 2023–24
