= Martin Turk =

Slovenian footballer (born 2003)

Personal information
- Date of birth: 21 August 2003 (age 23)
- Place of birth: Koper, Slovenia
- Height: 1.91 m (6 ft 3 in)
- Position: Goalkeeper

Team information
- Current team: Estoril
- Number: 16

Youth career
- 2010–2016: Jadran Dekani
- 2016–2019: Koper
- 2019–2021: Parma

Senior career*
Years	Team	Apps	(Gls)
2020–2024	Parma	10	(0)
2022–2023	→ Reggiana (loan)	8	(0)
2023	→ Sampdoria (loan)	4	(0)
2024–2025	Ruch Chorzów	21	(0)
2025–	Estoril	4	(0)

International career
2017–2018	Slovenia U15	6	(0)
2018–2019	Slovenia U16	6	(0)
2019	Slovenia U17	5	(0)
2021–2025	Slovenia U21	27	(0)
- * Club domestic league appearances and goals as of 2 November 2026

Martin Turk (born 21 August 2003) is a Slovenian professional footballer who plays as a goalkeeper for Primeira Liga club Estoril Praia.

== Club career ==
Born in Koper, Turk played in the youth sectors of Jadran Dekani and Koper, before joining Italian side Parma in 2019, aged 15. He made his professional debut for the club on 22 February 2022, in a goalless Serie B draw against Pisa.

On 19 July 2022, Turk was loaned to Serie C side Reggiana. He made eight league appearances for Reggiana in the first half of the 2022–23 season. On 13 January 2023, Turk was re-called by Parma and subsequently loaned out to Serie A side Sampdoria for the rest of the season. He made his debut for the blucerchiati on 12 March in a 4–2 away loss against Juventus, becoming the first 2003-born goalkeeper to play in Serie A.

On 16 July 2024, Turk joined Polish second division club Ruch Chorzów on a permanent deal, signing a three-year contract.

== International career ==
Turk played for various Slovenian national youth selections, such as the under-15, under-16, under-17 and under-21 teams. With the under-16 team, he was instrumental in keeping a clean sheet during a draw against Italy in 2019, saving a penalty from Sebastiano Esposito.

He was first called to the Slovenian senior team in June 2021, for a friendly game against Gibraltar, just after he played his first game with the under-21s.

During the following months, he became a regular starter with the under-21s during the Euro 2023 qualifiers, playing games such as a 2–2 draw against England and a 3–0 win against Albania.

== Personal life ==
During his childhood, Turk practiced dance before switching to football permanently. He is fluent in Slovene and Italian.

Both his father and his older brother played football at amateur level.

== Career statistics ==
=== Club ===
As of match played 22 November 2025

Appearances and goals by club, season and competition
Club	Season	League			National cup (Note: Includes Coppa Italia, Polish Cup, Taça de Portugal)		Total	
Club	Season	Division	Apps	Goals	Apps	Goals	Apps	Goals
Parma	2021–22	Serie B	10	0	0	0	10	0
Parma	2022–23	Serie B	0	0	0	0	0	0
Parma	2023–24	Serie B	0	0	0	0	0	0
Parma	Total		10	0	0	0	10	0
Reggiana (loan)	2022–23	Serie C	8	0	1	0	9	0
Sampdoria (loan)	2022–23	Serie A	4	0	—		4	0
Ruch Chorzów	2024–25	I liga	21	0	1	0	22	0
Estoril	2025–26	Primeira Liga	0	0	2	0	2	0
Career total			43	0	4	0	47	0
