= Idriz Voca =

Kosovan footballer (born 1997)

Personal information
- Full name: Idriz Voca
- Date of birth: 15 May 1997 (age 29)
- Place of birth: Stans, Switzerland
- Height: 1.81 m (5 ft 11 in)
- Position: Defensive midfielder

Team information
- Current team: Barletta
- Number: 42

Youth career
- 2004–2008: FC Hergiswil
- 2008–2015: Luzern

Senior career*
Years	Team	Apps	(Gls)
2015–2017	Luzern U21	50	(4)
2017–2020	Luzern	83	(3)
2020–2021	Ankaragücü	26	(0)
2022–2024	Cosenza	73	(3)
2024–2026	Triestina	51	(2)
2026–	Barletta	2	(0)

International career^{‡}
2017	Kosovo U21	3	(0)
2018–	Kosovo	15	(0)
- * Club domestic league appearances and goals as of 28 August 2026 ‡ National team caps and goals as of 4 June 2021

Idriz Voca (born 15 May 1997) is a professional footballer who plays as a defensive midfielder for Serie C Group C club Barletta. Born in Switzerland, he represents Kosovo at international level.

== Club career ==
=== Luzern ===
On 26 February 2017, Voca was named as a Luzern substitute for the first time in a Swiss Super League match against Basel. His professional debut with Luzern came on 5 April in the 2016–17 Swiss Cup semifinal against Sion after coming on as a substitute at 103rd minute of the extra time in place of Tomi Juric and the entire match finished in a goalless draw and advanced in the penalty shoot-out, where Voca scored the 6th and last penalty but Luzern lost 6–5.

=== Ankaragücü ===
On 23 September 2020, Voca signed a two-year contract with Süper Lig club Ankaragücü. Four days later, he made his debut in a 0–0 away draw against Sivasspor after coming on as a substitute at 62nd minute in place of Alper Potuk.

=== Cosenza ===
On 28 January 2022, Voca signed a two-and-a-half-year contract with Serie B club Cosenza. Two days later, he was named as a Cosenza substitute for the first time in a league match against Cittadella. His debut with Cosenza came on 5 February in a 0–0 home draw against Brescia after coming on as a substitute at 67th minute in place of Rodney Kongolo.

=== Triestina ===
On 16 July 2024, Voca moved to Serie C club Triestina and signed a three-season contract.

== International career ==
=== Youth ===
==== Albania ====
Voca during two periods as April 2013 and January 2016 was part of Albania at youth international level, respectively has been part of the U15, and U21 teams, but failed to make his debut as both call-ups were for training camps.

==== Kosovo ====
On 29 August 2017, Voca received a call-up from Kosovo U21 for a 2019 UEFA European Under-21 Championship qualification matches against Norway U21 and Germany U21. Three days later, he made his debut with Kosovo U21 in a 2019 UEFA European Under-21 Championship qualification against Norway U21 after being named in the starting line-up.

=== Senior ===
On 19 March 2018, Voca received a call-up from Kosovo for the friendly matches against Madagascar and Burkina Faso. Five days later, he made his debut with Kosovo in a friendly match against Madagascar after coming on as a substitute at 77th minute in place of fellow debutant Edon Zhegrova.

== Personal life ==
Voca was born in Stans, Switzerland from Kosovo Albanian father from Mitrovica and Bosnian mother. He holds Kosovar, Albanian, and Swiss passports.

== Career statistics ==
=== Club ===
As of match played 11 November 2023

Club	Season	League			Cup		Continental (Note: Including continental competitions, such as UEFA Champions League and UEFA Europa League)		Other		Total	
Club	Season	Division	Apps	Goals	Apps	Goals	Apps	Goals	Apps	Goals	Apps	Goals
Luzern U21	2015–16	Swiss 1. Liga	21	0	0	0	—				21	0
Luzern U21	2016–17	Swiss 1. Liga	17	2	0	0	—		2 (Note: Appearance in 2016–17 Swiss 1. Liga promotion play-offs)	0	19	2
Luzern U21	2017–18	Swiss 1. Liga	12	2	0	0	—				12	2
Luzern U21	Total		50	4	0	0	—		2	0	52	4
Luzern	2016–17	Swiss Super League	3	0	1	0	—				4	0
Luzern	2017–18	Swiss Super League	19	0	1	0	0	0	—		20	0
Luzern	2018–19	Swiss Super League	30	1	4	0	2	0	—		36	1
Luzern	2019–20	Swiss Super League	30	2	4	0	4	1	—		38	3
Luzern	2020–21	Swiss Super League	1	0	0	0	—				1	0
Luzern	Total		83	3	10	0	6	1	—		99	4
Ankaragücü	2020–21	Süper Lig	26	0	1	0	—				27	0
Cosenza	2021–22	Serie B	6	0	0	0	—				6	0
Cosenza	2022–23	Serie B	33	0	1	0	—		2 (Note: Appearances in the 2022–23 Serie B relegation play-out)	0	36	0
Cosenza	2023–24	Serie B	11	3	1	0	—				12	3
Cosenza	Total		50	3	2	0	0	0	2	0	54	3
Career total			209	10	13	0	6	1	4	0	232	11

=== International ===
As of 4 June 2021

National team	Year	Apps	Goals
Kosovo
Kosovo	2018	4	0
Kosovo	2019	6	0
Kosovo	2020	0	0
Kosovo	2021	5	0
Total		15	0
