= Paolo Napoletano =

Italian footballer (born 2002)

Personal information
- Date of birth: 4 February 2002 (age 24)
- Place of birth: Penne, Italy
- Position: Forward

Team information
- Current team: Parma

Youth career
- –2019: Pescara
- 2019: → Parma (youth loan)
- 2019–2022: Parma
- 2022: → Pescara (loan)

Senior career*
Years	Team	Apps	(Gls)
2021–	Parma	0	(0)
2021–2022	→ Virton (loan)	1	(0)
2022–2023	→ Messina (loan)	13	(0)
- * Club domestic league appearances and goals as of 23 April 2023

Paolo Napoletano (born 4 February 2002) is an Italian professional footballer who plays as a forward for Serie A club Parma.

== Club career ==
On 26 July 2022, Napoletano joined Serie C club Messina on loan.

== Career statistics ==
=== Club ===
As of 16 August 2021

Club	Season	League			Cup		Other		Total	
Club	Season	Division	Apps	Goals	Apps	Goals	Apps	Goals	Apps	Goals
Parma	2021–22	Serie B	0	0	0	0	0	0	0	0
Virton (loan)	2021–22	Proximus League	1	0	0	0	0	0	1	0
Career total			1	0	0	0	0	0	1	0
