= Matteo Gerace =

Italian footballer

Personal information
- Date of birth: 27 August 2001 (age 25)
- Place of birth: Novi Ligure, Piedmont, Italy
- Height: 1.82 m (6 ft 0 in)
- Position: Midfielder

Team information
- Current team: Vogherese

Youth career
- –2019: Alessandria

Senior career*
Years	Team	Apps	(Gls)
2018–2022	Alessandria	16	(0)
2020–2021	→ Siena (loan)	9	(0)
2021	→ Borgosesia (loan)	15	(0)
2022	Fiorenzuola	1	(0)
2022–2023	Crema	8	(0)
2023–	Vogherese	13	(0)
- * Club domestic league appearances and goals as of 20 December 2023

Matteo Gerace (born 27 August 2001) is an Italian footballer who plays as a midfielder for Serie D club Vogherese.

== Career ==
=== Alessandria ===
A product of the club's youth academy, Gerace made his senior debut for the club on 16 December 2018, coming on as a 79th-minute substitute for Tommaso Tentoni in a 0–0 draw with Pro Patria. In July 2019, he signed his first professional contract with Alessandria.

==== Loan to Siena ====
On 22 September 2020, he joined Serie D club Siena on loan.

==== Loan to Borgosesia ====
On 24 February 2021, he was loaned to Borgosesia, again in Serie D.

=== Fiorenzuola ===
On 31 January 2022, Gerace moved to Serie C club Fiorenzuola on a permanent basis with a contract until the end of the season.

=== Crema ===
On 12 August 2022, Gerace signed with Crema in Serie D.
