= Stefano Rossoni =

Italian footballer

Personal information
- Date of birth: 14 January 1997 (age 29)
- Place of birth: Cattolica, Italy
- Height: 1.87 m (6 ft 2 in)
- Position: Right-back

Team information
- Current team: Arzignano
- Number: 5

Youth career
- Vis Pesaro

Senior career*
Years	Team	Apps	(Gls)
2013–2019	Vis Pesaro	104	(4)
2019–2020	Carpi	16	(1)
2020–2022	Fermana	59	(0)
2022–2024	Vis Pesaro	52	(1)
2024–	Arzignano	54	(1)
- * Club domestic league appearances and goals as of 30 April 2026

Stefano Rossoni (born 14 January 1997) is an Italian professional footballer who plays as a right-back for Serie C Group A club Arzignano.

== Club career ==
Born in Cattolica, Rossoni started his career in Vis Pesaro, and was promoted to the first team in 2013. He played six seasons for the club.

On 1 August 2019, he joined Serie C club Carpi.

On 17 September 2020, he signed for Fermana.

On 21 July 2022, Rossoni returned to Vis Pesaro on a two-year contract.
