= Ciro Panico =

Italian footballer (born 1999)

Personal information
- Date of birth: 3 August 1999 (age 27)
- Place of birth: Naples, Italy
- Height: 1.70 m (5 ft 7 in)
- Position: Left-back

Team information
- Current team: Giugliano
- Number: 2

Youth career
- Gragnano

Senior career*
| Years | Team | Apps | (Gls) |
| 2016–2017 | Gragnano | 10 | (0) |
| 2017–2021 | Potenza | 82 | (0) |
| 2021–2022 | Cosenza | 0 | (0) |
| 2022 | Juve Stabia | 10 | (0) |
| 2022–2023 | Cosenza | 9 | (0) |
| 2023 | → Feralpisalò (loan) | 11 | (0) |
| 2023–2024 | Taranto | 23 | (0) |
| 2024–2025 | Sorrento | 24 | (0) |
| 2025–2026 | Foggia | 18 | (0) |
| 2026– | Giugliano | 0 | (0) |
- * Club domestic league appearances and goals as of 20 December 2025

Ciro Panico (born 3 August 1999) is an Italian professional footballer who plays as a left-back for Serie C Group C club Giugliano.

== Career ==
Born in Naples, Panico started his career in Serie D club Gragnano, he was promoted to the first team in 2016–17 season.

In 2017, he moved to Serie D club Potenza. He won the promotion to Serie C on his first year. Panico made his professional debut on 16 September 2018 against Catanzaro. He left the club in 2021, played three Serie C seasons.

In August 2021, he signed with Serie B club Cosenza.

On 25 January 2022, he signed with Serie C club Juve Stabia.

On 10 January 2023, Panico moved on loan to Feralpisalò for the rest of the season.

On 24 August 2023, Panico signed a one-season contract with Taranto.

On 3 August 2024, he joined Sorrento.
