= Kristjan Matošević =

Slovenian footballer (born 1997)

Personal information
- Date of birth: 5 June 1997 (age 29)
- Place of birth: Koper, Slovenia
- Height: 1.92 m (6 ft 4 in)
- Position: Goalkeeper

Team information
- Current team: Barletta
- Number: 1

Youth career
- –2012: Triestina
- 2012–2014: Koper
- 2014–2016: Catania
- 2016: → Lazio (loan)

Senior career*
Years	Team	Apps	(Gls)
2015–2016	Catania	0	(0)
2016	→ Lazio (loan)	0	(0)
2017	Domžale	1	(0)
2018	Mura	10	(0)
2018	→ Ankaran (loan)	14	(0)
2019–2020	Triestina	4	(0)
2020–2023	Cosenza	28	(0)
2023	→ Triestina (loan)	14	(0)
2023–2026	Triestina	69	(0)
2024–2025	→ Juve Stabia (loan)	0	(0)
2026–	Barletta	2	(0)

International career
2013	Slovenia U16	2	(0)
2015	Croatia U18	2	(0)
- * Club domestic league appearances and goals as of 28 August 2026

Kristjan Matošević (born 5 June 1997) is a professional footballer who plays as a goalkeeper for Serie C Group C club Barletta. Born in Slovenia, he represented Slovenia and Croatia internationally.

== Career ==
Before the second half of 2015–16, Matošević was sent on loan to Serie A side Lazio from fellow Serie A club Catania.

In 2017, he trialed for Dutch club Groningen.

Before the second half of 2016–17, he signed for Domžale in the Slovenian top flight.

Before the second half of 2017–18, Matošević signed for Slovenian second division outfit Mura.

In 2020, he signed for Cosenza in the Italian second division from Italian third division team Triestina.

On 28 January 2023, returned to Triestina on loan with an option to buy.

On 19 July 2023, Matošević's contract with Cosenza was terminated by mutual consent. On the same day he returned to Triestina on permanent basis.

On 11 July 2024, Matošević joined Juve Stabia on loan with an option to buy.
