= Alessandro Arioli =

Italian footballer (born 2003)

Personal information
- Date of birth: 24 May 2003 (age 23)
- Height: 1.85 m (6 ft 1 in)
- Position: Forward

Youth career
- Cosenza
- 2019–2020: → Aprilia (loan)

Senior career*
Years	Team	Apps	(Gls)
2021–2026	Cosenza	10	(1)
2024	→ Monopoli (loan)	5	(0)
2024–2025	→ Chieti (loan)	8	(0)
- * Club domestic league appearances and goals as of 26 April 2026

Alessandro Arioli (born 24 May 2003) is an Italian footballer who plays as a forward.

== Club career ==
Arioli made his Serie B debut for Cosenza on 12 March 2022 in a game against Ternana.

On 12 January 2024, Arioli joined Serie C club Monopoli on loan.
