= Andrea Vallocchia =

Italian footballer (born 1997)

Personal information
- Date of birth: 22 May 1997 (age 29)
- Place of birth: Rieti, Italy
- Height: 1.79 m (5 ft 10 in)
- Position: Midfielder

Youth career
- –2015: Benevento

Senior career*
Years	Team	Apps	(Gls)
2015–2016	Benevento	0	(0)
2015–2016	→ Sambenedettese (loan)	6	(1)
2016–2018	Sambenedettese	37	(3)
2018	→ Olbia (loan)	11	(1)
2018–2021	Olbia	51	(1)
2020–2021	→ Juve Stabia (loan)	35	(2)
2021–2023	Cosenza	30	(0)
2023	Reggiana	15	(0)
2023–2025	Triestina	55	(3)
2025–2026	Ternana	43	(2)
- * Club domestic league appearances and goals as of 30 April 2026

Andrea Vallocchia (born 22 May 1997) is an Italian professional footballer who plays as a midfielder.

== Club career ==
He made his professional Serie C debut for Sambenedettese on 29 October 2016 in a game against Feralpisalò.

On 21 August 2021, he signed a two-year contract with an option to extend for another year with Serie B club Cosenza. He made his Serie B debut for Cosenza on 22 August 2021 against Ascoli.

On 2 January 2023 he joined Reggiana on permanent basis.

On 25 January 2025, Vallocchia signed with Ternana.
