= Salvatore Dario La Vardera =

Italian footballer

Personal information
- Date of birth: 7 March 2002 (age 24)
- Place of birth: Palermo, Italy
- Height: 1.76 m (5 ft 9 in)
- Position: Left-back

Team information
- Current team: Giugliano
- Number: 33

Youth career
- –2019: Palermo
- 2019–2021: Cosenza

Senior career*
Years	Team	Apps	(Gls)
2021–2024	Cosenza	10	(0)
2021	→ Acireale (loan)	19	(3)
2021–2022	→ Imolese (loan)	9	(0)
2024	→ Monopoli (loan)	9	(0)
2024–	Giugliano	28	(1)
- * Club domestic league appearances and goals as of 1 May 2026

Salvatore Dario La Vardera (born 7 March 2002) is an Italian professional footballer who plays as a left-back for Serie C Group C club Giugliano.

== Club career ==
Born in Palermo, La Vardera was promoted to the Cosenza first team for the 2020–21 Serie B season. On 30 September 2020, he made his debut in the Coppa Italia against Alessandria. He made his Serie B debut on 22 August 2021 against Ascoli as a late substitute.

On 31 August 2021, he was loaned to Imolese, in Serie C. On 12 January 2024, La Vardera was loaned by Monopoli.
