= Gianluigi Sueva =

Dominican Republic footballer (b. 2001)

Personal information
- Date of birth: 1 January 2001 (age 25)
- Place of birth: Cetraro, Italy
- Height: 1.74 m (5 ft 9 in)
- Position: Winger

Team information
- Current team: ASD Sambiase 2023
- Number: 7

Youth career
- –2020: Cosenza

Senior career*
Years	Team	Apps	(Gls)
2017–2023	Cosenza	20	(0)
2022	→ Potenza (loan)	2	(0)
2022–2023	→ Olbia (loan)	19	(0)
2023–2024	Lucchese	7	(0)
2024	Chieti	12	(0)
2024–2025	Acireale	32	(7)
2025–	ASD Sambiase 2023	28	(7)

International career
2021–2022	Dominican Republic	4	(0)
- * Club domestic league appearances and goals as of 21 September 2026

Gianluigi Sueva (born 1 January 2001) is a professional footballer who plays as a winger for Serie D club ASD Sambiase 2023. Born in Italy, he represented for the Dominican Republic national team.

== Club career ==
He was raised in Cosenza youth teams and began receiving call-ups to the senior squad in 2017.

He made his Serie B debut for Cosenza on 3 October 2020 in a game against SPAL. He substituted Angelo Corsi in the 71st minute.

On 27 January 2022, he was loaned to Potenza. On 1 August 2022, Sueva moved on loan to Olbia.

On 23 August 2023, Sueva moved to Lucchese on a permanent basis.

== International career ==
On 23 February 2021, Sueva was named to the Dominican Republic national under-23 football team preliminary squad for the 2020 CONCACAF Men's Olympic Qualifying Championship. However, he did not make the final squad as he was instead called up by the Dominican Republic at senior level for two 2022 FIFA World Cup qualification – CONCACAF first round matches against Dominica and Anguilla on 24 and 27 March 2021, respectively.

== Personal life ==
Sueva was born in Italy to an Italian father and Dominican mother.
