= Pietro Martino =

Italian footballer

Personal information
- Date of birth: 4 August 1997 (age 29)
- Place of birth: Modena, Italy
- Height: 1.80 m (5 ft 11 in)
- Positions: Right-back; left-back

Team information
- Current team: Casertana
- Number: 23

Youth career
- –2015: Sassuolo

Senior career*
Years	Team	Apps	(Gls)
2015–2016	Sassuolo	0	(0)
2015–2016	→ Legnago (loan)	24	(4)
2016	Arzignano	9	(0)
2016–2017	Virtus Castelfranco	16	(2)
2017–2018	Adriese	32	(5)
2018–2021	Clodiense	93	(6)
2021–2022	Foggia	30	(1)
2022–2025	Cosenza	51	(0)
2026–	Casertana	9	(0)
- * Club domestic league appearances and goals as of 29 August 2026

Pietro Martino (born 4 August 1997) is an Italian football player who plays for Serie C Group C club Casertana.

== Club career ==
Martino spent the first six seasons of his senior career in the fourth-tier Serie D before joining Foggia in Serie C in July 2021.

On 7 July 2022, Martino signed with Serie B club Cosenza. He made his Serie B debut for Cosenza on 14 August 2022 in a game against Benevento.
