= Rodney Kongolo =

Dutch footballer (born 1998)

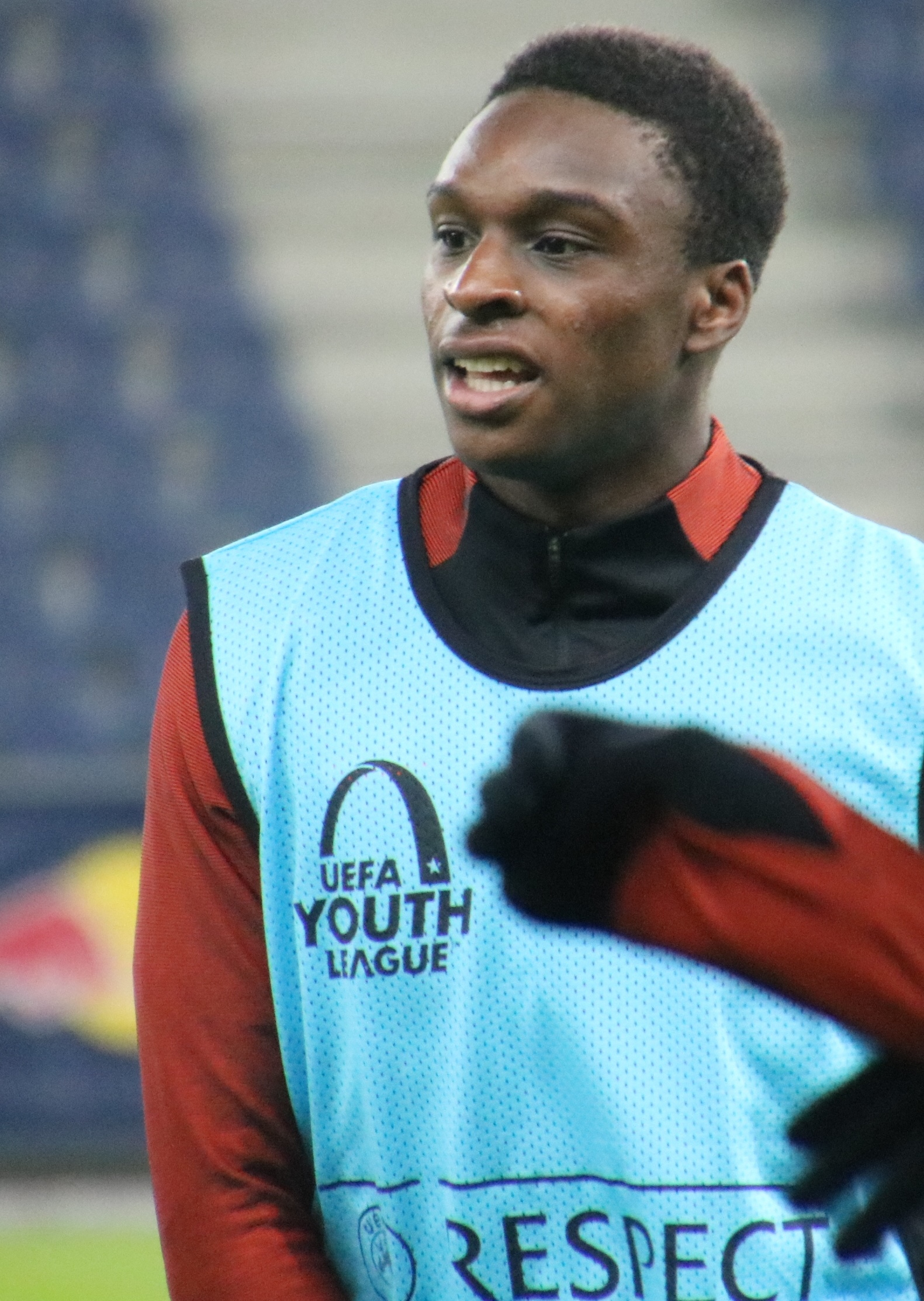
- Kongolo with Manchester City U19 in 2017.

Personal information
- Full name: Rodney Nkele Kongolo
- Date of birth: 9 January 1998 (age 28)
- Place of birth: Rotterdam, Netherlands
- Height: 1.87 m (6 ft 2 in)
- Position: Midfielder

Team information
- Current team: Emmen
- Number: 25

Youth career
- Feyenoord
- 2014–2017: Manchester City

Senior career*
Years	Team	Apps	(Gls)
2017–2018	Manchester City	0	(0)
2017–2018	→ Doncaster Rovers (loan)	35	(0)
2018–2022	SC Heerenveen	76	(5)
2022–2023	Cosenza	13	(0)
2023–2025	Roda JC	48	(2)
2025–	Emmen	34	(2)

International career
2013–2014	Netherlands U16	9	(0)
2014	Netherlands U17	4	(0)
2016–2017	Netherlands U19	11	(1)
2017–2018	Netherlands U20	5	(0)
- * Club domestic league appearances and goals as of 28 April 2026

Rodney Nkele Kongolo (born 9 January 1998) is a Dutch professional footballer who plays as a midfielder for Eerste Divisie club Emmen.

== Club career ==
=== Manchester City ===
Born in Rotterdam, Kongolo started out at Feyenoord's youth academy. His performance for the Netherlands U20 side in February 2013 attracted interest from Premier League sides Arsenal, Chelsea and Manchester City. Because he was 15 at the time, there were concerns for Feyenoord, as Kongolo's departure could leave the club with no compensation and previously saw their youth talents depart in recent years, such as, Nathan Aké, Jeffrey Bruma and Kyle Ebecilio. Eventually, Kongolo moved from Feyenoord to Manchester City in March 2014, immediately sent to the development squad and because he was 16 at the time, they would pay Feyenoord compensation. Later in July 2014, he signed his first professional contract with the club.

At Manchester City development side, Kongolo progressed through for both City U18s and the Elite Development Squad, as he played in a box-to-box role and in a more defensive position. Along the way, he also developed as captain for the development squad in UEFA Youth League and later in the Premier League 2. At the end of the 2016–17 season, Kongolo was named Player's Player for the EDS.

By the time of his departure from Manchester City, Kongolo failed to make a first team breakthrough and made no first team appearances for the side.

==== Loan spell at Doncaster Rovers ====
On 3 August 2017, Kongolo signed on loan for Doncaster Rovers on a six-month loan.

He made his Doncaster Rovers debut, where he came on as a substitute for Matty Blair in the 70th minute, in a 0–0 draw against Gillingham in the opening game of the season. In a follow–up match, he scored his first goal for Doncaster Rovers in a 3–2 EFL Cup win at Bradford City on 8 August 2017. Since joining the club, Kongolo established himself in the first team, where he was featured in the midfield position. On 4 January 2018, his performance at Doncaster Rovers saw his loan extended until the end of the season. Towards the end of the season, his playing time soon saw him coming off from the substitute bench. At the end of the 2017–18 season, Kongolo finished his time at Doncaster Rovers, making 42 appearances and scoring once in all competitions.

=== Heerenveen ===
Kongolo signed a three-year contract with Heerenveen on 18 July 2018. The transfer fee was in the region of £750,000.

He made his SC Heerenveen debut, where he came on as a substitute for Nemanja Mihajlović in the 57th minute, in a 3–2 win over PEC Zwolle in the opening game of the season. He then made his first start on 17 August 2018, where he started the whole game, in a 3–2 win over Vitesse.

=== Cosenza ===
On 31 January 2022, Kongolo signed with Cosenza in Italy. On 16 January 2023, his contract with Cosenza was terminated by mutual consent.

=== Roda JC ===
On 23 May 2023, it was announced that Kongolo would join Eerste Divisie club Roda JC ahead of the 2023–24 season, signing a two-year deal. He made his competitive debut for the club on the first matchday of the season, starting in a 4–1 home win over Helmond Sport on 11 August. On 9 February 2024, he scored his first goal for De Koempels, opening the scoring with a shot from distance in a 4–1 home victory against Dordrecht. Appointed captain during his first season under manager Bas Sibum, he led Roda to the promotion play-offs, but the team was eliminated in the first round by eventual promotees NAC Breda.

In May 2025, Roda JC confirmed that Kongolo would leave the club following the expiration of his contract at the end of the 2024–25 season.

=== Emmen ===
On 8 August 2025, Kongolo joined Eerste Divisie side FC Emmen on a free transfer, signing a two-year contract.

== International career ==
Kongolo is a Dutch youth international, playing from under-16 to under-20 levels. In January 2013, Kongolo was called up for the Netherlands U15 squad for the first time. It wasn't until on 16 April 2013 where he captained the whole game, in a 0–0 draw against Belgium U15. He captained the U15 side once again, in a 4–1 loss against Germany U15 on 14 May 2013. He went on to make four appearances for the Netherlands U15 between April 2013 and May 2013.

In September 2013, Kongolo was called up for the Netherlands U16 squad for the first time. A month later, on 29 October 2013, he made his Netherlands U16 debut, where he came on as a substitute in the 70th minute, in a 2–1 win over Belgium U16. Two days later, on 31 October 2013, he made his first start, in a 2–1 loss against France U16. Kongolo went on to make nine appearances for the U16 side between October 2013 and May 2014.

In September 2014, Kongolo was called up to the Netherlands U17 squad for the first time. He made his Netherlands U17 debut on 10 September 2014, in a 3–3 draw against Germany U17. Kongolo went on to make four appearances for the U17 side between September 2014 and October 2014.

In August 2015, Kongolo was called up to the Netherlands U18 squad for the first time. He made his Netherlands U18 debut, where he started the whole game, in a 2–0 loss against England U18 on 3 September 2015. Kongolo went on to make six appearances for the U18 side between September 2015 and March 2016.

In August 2016, Kongolo was called up to the Netherlands U19 squad for the first time. He made his Netherlands U19 debut on 1 September 2016, where he played 70 minutes, in a 1–1 draw against England U19. A month later on 8 October 2016, he set up a goal for Kaj Sierhuis, who scored a hat–trick, in a 4–0 loss win over San Marino U19. In June 2017, he was called up by the Netherlands U19 squad for the UEFA European Under-19 Championship. Kongolo then scored his first goal for the U19 side, in a 1–1 draw against Bulgaria U19 on 9 July 2017. He went on to make four appearances throughout the tournament, as Netherlands U19 were eliminated in the semi–finals against Portugal U19. He went on to make eleven appearances for the Netherlands U19 side.

In August 2017, Kongolo was called up by Netherlands U20 for the first time. He made his Netherlands U20 debut on 4 September 2017, where he started the whole game, in a 1–0 win over Portugal U20.

== Personal life ==
Kongolo is of Congolese descent, making him eligible to play for DR Congo. He has two brothers who are also both footballers, Terence and Fidel.

In addition to speaking Dutch, Kongolo speaks English and French.

== Career statistics ==
As of match played 2 May 2025

Appearances and goals by club, season and competition
Club	Season	League			National cup		League cup		Other		Total	
Club	Season	Division	Apps	Goals	Apps	Goals	Apps	Goals	Apps	Goals	Apps	Goals
Manchester City	2017–18	Premier League	0	0	0	0	0	0	0	0	0	0
Doncaster Rovers (loan)	2017–18	League One	35	0	3	0	3	1	1 (Note: Appearance in the EFL Trophy)	0	42	1
Heerenveen	2018–19	Eredivisie	9	0	1	0	—		—		10	0
Heerenveen	2019–20	Eredivisie	26	4	3	0	—		—		29	4
Heerenveen	2020–21	Eredivisie	31	1	4	1	—		—		35	2
Heerenveen	2021–22	Eredivisie	10	0	2	0	—		—		12	0
Heerenveen	Total		76	5	10	1	0	0	0	0	86	6
Cosenza	2021–22	Serie B	13	0	0	0	—		2 (Note: Appearances in Serie B relegation play-out)	0	15	0
Roda JC	2023–24	Eerste Divisie	32	1	0	0	—		2 (Note: Appearances in Eredivisie promotion/relegation playoffs)	0	34	1
Roda JC	2024–25	Eerste Divisie	16	1	0	0	—		—		16	1
Roda JC	Total		48	2	0	0	—		2	0	50	2
Career total			172	7	13	1	3	1	5	0	193	8
