= Aldo Florenzi =

Italian footballer (born 2002)

Personal information
- Date of birth: 2 April 2002 (age 24)
- Place of birth: Nuoro, Italy
- Height: 1.83 m (6 ft 0 in)
- Position: Midfielder

Team information
- Current team: Spezia

Youth career
- –2020: Chievo
- 2019–2020: → Cosenza (loan)
- 2020–2021: Cosenza

Senior career*
Years	Team	Apps	(Gls)
2021–2026	Cosenza	139	(10)
2026–	Spezia	0	(0)
- * Club domestic league appearances and goals as of 1 May 2026

Aldo Florenzi (born 2 April 2002) is an Italian professional footballer who plays as a midfielder for Serie C Group B club Spezia.

== Career ==
Florenzi made his Serie B debut for Cosenza on 22 August 2021, in a game against Ascoli.
