= Michael Venturi =

Italian footballer

Personal information
- Date of birth: 23 January 1999 (age 27)
- Place of birth: Rimini, Italy
- Height: 1.93 m (6 ft 4 in)
- Position: Centre-back

Team information
- Current team: Avellino (on loan from Venezia)
- Number: 23

Youth career
- –2015: Spezia
- 2015–2017: Forlì
- 2018–2019: Carpi
- 2019: → Gozzano (loan)

Senior career*
Years	Team	Apps	(Gls)
2017–2018	Sammaurese	33	(0)
2018–2021	Carpi	34	(1)
2019	→ Gozzano (loan)	0	(0)
2019–2020	→ Fermana (loan)	4	(0)
2021–2025	Cosenza	90	(3)
2025–	Venezia	8	(0)
2026–	→ Avellino (loan)	0	(0)
- * Club domestic league appearances and goals as of 22 August 2026

Michael Venturi (born 23 January 1999) is an Italian professional footballer who plays as a centre-back for Serie B club Avellino, on loan from Venezia.

== Club career ==
He made his professional Serie C debut for Fermana on 25 September 2019 in a game against Südtirol.

On 10 August 2021, he signed a three-year contract with Serie B club Cosenza. He made his Serie B debut for Cosenza on 22 August 2021 against Ascoli.

On 13 August 2025, Venturi joined Venezia in Serie B on a three-season deal.
