= Stadio San Vito-Gigi Marulla =

Multi-purpose stadium in Cosenza, Italy

Coordinates: 39°18′36″N 16°13′52″E

Stadio San Vito "Gigi Marulla"
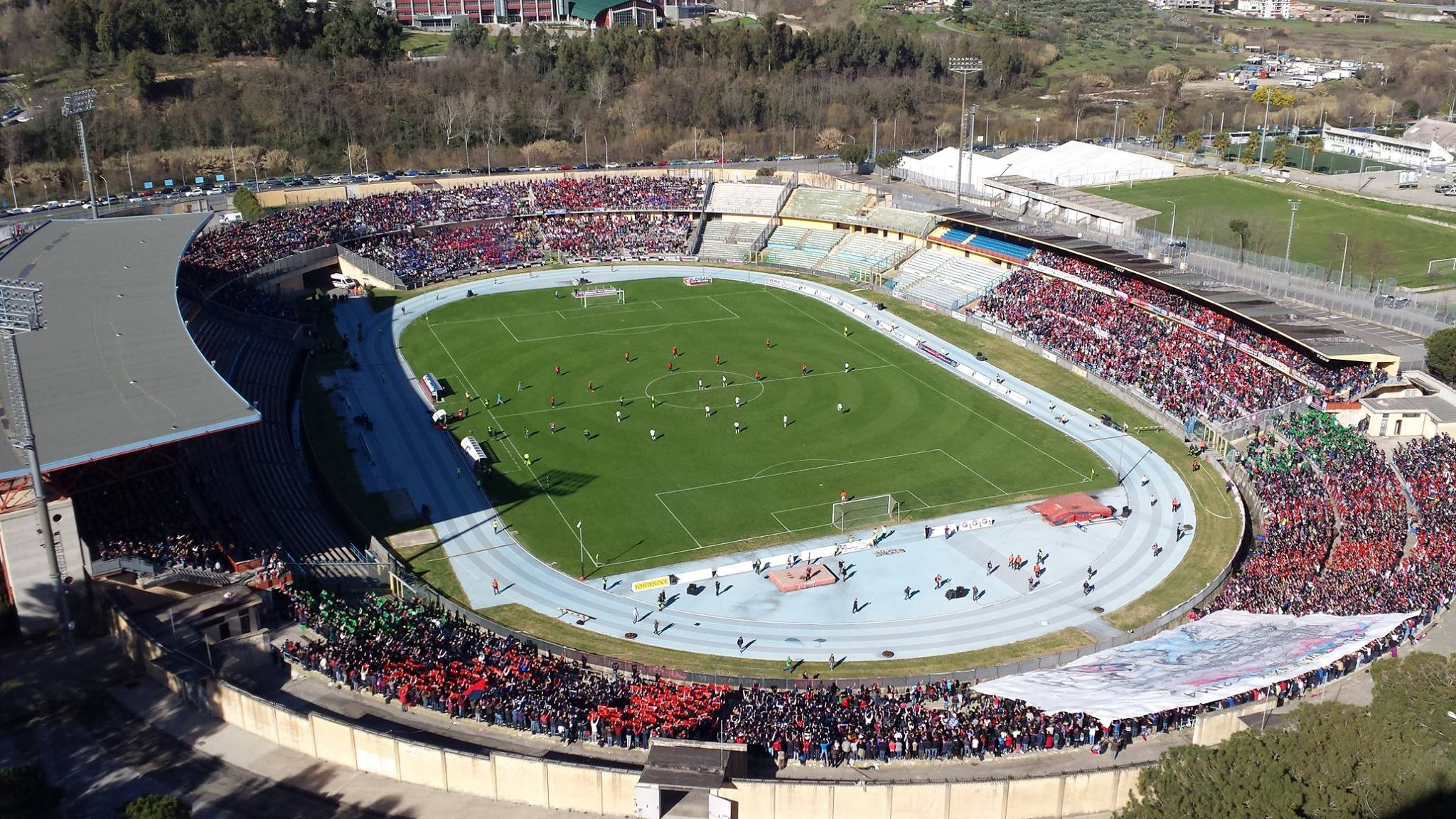
- Interactive map of Stadio San Vito "Gigi Marulla"
- Location: Cosenza, Italy
- Owner: Municipality of Cosenza
- Operator: Cosenza Calcio
- Capacity: 20,987
- Surface: Grass; 105×70m

Construction
- Opened: 1964

Tenant
- Cosenza Calcio (1964–present)

Stadio San Vito "Gigi Marulla" is a multi-purpose stadium, in Cosenza, Italy. The stadium has a capacity of 20,987. It is currently used mostly for football matches and it is the home ground of Cosenza Calcio from 1964.

Sting performed at the stadium during his Ten Summoner's Tales Tour on July 17, 1993.

Bob Dylan concluded his 2006 European Tour at the stadium on July 20, 2006.

In 2015 the stadium was entitled to Luigi Marulla, former Cosenza Calcio player and coach.
