= Andrea Hristov =

Bulgarian footballer

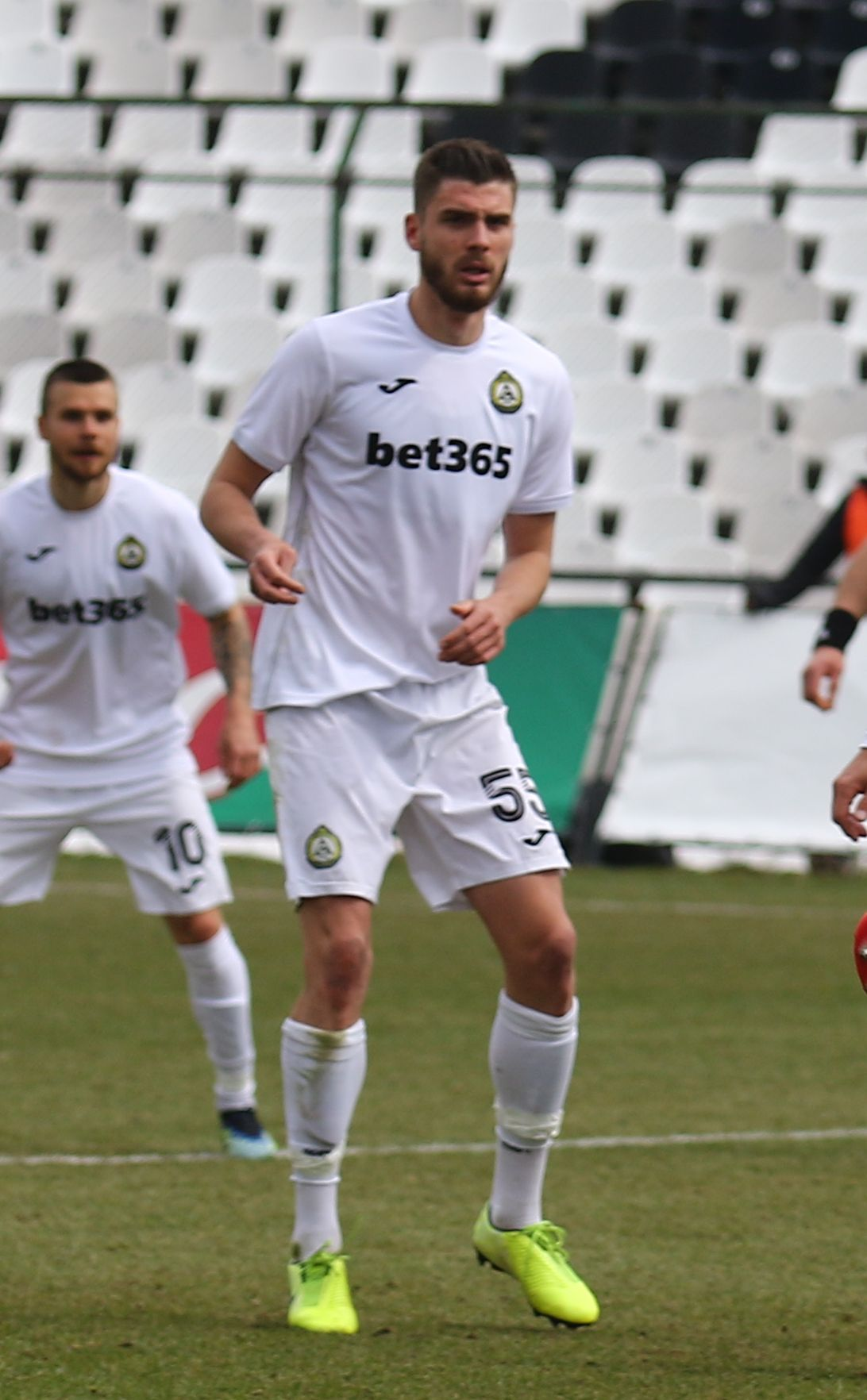
- Hristov playing for Slavia Sofia in 2021

Personal information
- Full name: Andrea Rosenov Hristov
- Date of birth: 1 March 1999 (age 27)
- Place of birth: Sofia, Bulgaria
- Height: 1.91 m (6 ft 3 in)
- Position: Centre-back

Team information
- Current team: Vizela
- Number: 55

Youth career
- –2013: Levski Sofia
- 2013–2016: Slavia Sofia

Senior career*
Years	Team	Apps	(Gls)
2016–2022	Slavia Sofia	115	(4)
2019	→ Cosenza (loan)	3	(0)
2022–2025	Cosenza	29	(1)
2022–2023	→ Reggiana (loan)	10	(1)
2023–2024	→ Potenza (loan)	16	(0)
2025–	Vizela	17	(0)

International career^{‡}
2016	Bulgaria U17	3	(0)
2017	Bulgaria U18	1	(0)
2016–2018	Bulgaria U19	16	(1)
2018–2020	Bulgaria U21	11	(0)
2021–	Bulgaria	15	(1)
- * Club domestic league appearances and goals as of 19 June 2026 ‡ National team caps and goals as of 5 June 2026

Andrea Rosenov Hristov (Bulgarian: Андреа Росенов Христов; born 1 March 1999) is a Bulgarian professional footballer who plays as a centre-back for Liga Portugal 2 club Vizela.

== Club career ==
=== Slavia Sofia ===
Hristov started his career at Levski Sofia before moving to Slavia Sofia in 2013. He made his competitive debut for Slavia on 1 October 2016, coming as a substitute in a league match against Vereya, playing alongside his twin brother Petko.

On 3 April 2017, Hristov signed a professional contract with the team until 31 July 2020. On 21 April 2018 Hristov was named as a captain of the team in the match against Cherno More Varna.

==== Cosenza (loan) ====
On 29 January 2019 Hristov joined Serie B team Cosenza on loan until end of the season with a buyout clause.

=== Cosenza ===
On 13 January 2022, he returned to Cosenza and signed a 3.5-year contract with the club. On 1 September 2022, Hristov was loaned by Reggiana. On 12 August 2023, he moved on a new loan to Potenza.

=== Vizela ===
On 24 July 2025, Hristov signed a two-year contract with Vizela in Portuguese second tier.

== International career ==
=== Youth levels ===
Hristov was called up for the Bulgaria U19 team for the 2017 European Under-19 Championship qualification from 22 to 27 March 2017. After a draw and 2 wins the team qualified for the knockout phase, which will be held in July 2017.

=== Senior levels ===
He was called up by Georgi Dermendzhiev for a friendly match against Belarus in February 2020, but remained on the bench. He made his debut on 31 March 2021 in a World Cup qualifier against Northern Ireland. His brother Petko made his debut in the same game as well.

== Personal life ==
Andrea Hristov has a twin brother, Petko, who is also a professional footballer.

== Career statistics ==
=== Club ===
As of 4 October 2025

Club performance			League		Cup		Continental		Other		Total	
Club	League	Season	Apps	Goals	Apps	Goals	Apps	Goals	Apps	Goals	Apps	Goals
Bulgaria			League		Bulgarian Cup		Europe		Other		Total	
Slavia Sofia	First League	2016–17	16	0	1	0	–		3 (Note: Relegation Play-offs)	0	20	0
Slavia Sofia	First League	2017–18	26	3	5	0	–		–		31	3
Slavia Sofia	First League	2018–19	12	0	2	0	3	0	1 (Note: 2018 Bulgarian Supercup)	0	18	0
Slavia Sofia	First League	2019–20	18	0	1	0	–		–		19	0
Slavia Sofia	First League	2020–21	26	1	4	0	1	0	–		31	1
Slavia Sofia	First League	2021–22	17	0	1	0	–		–		18	0
Slavia Sofia	Total		115	4	14	0	4	0	4	0	137	4
Cosenza (loan)	Serie B	2018–19	3	0	0	0	–		–		3	0
Consenza	Serie B	2021–22	10	0	–		–		1 (Note: Appearances in Serie B play-outs)	0	11	0
Consenza	Serie B	2024–25	19	1	1	0	–		–		20	1
Consenza	Total		32	1	1	0	–		1	0	34	1
Reggiana (loan)	Serie C	2022–23	11	1	–		–		1 (Note: Appearance(s) in Supercoppa di Serie C)	0	12	1
Potenza (loan)	Serie C	2023–24	16	0	1	0	–		2 (Note: Appearances in Serie C play-outs)	0	19	0
Vizela	Liga Portugal 2	2025–26	2	0	1	0	–		–		3	0
Career total			176	6	17	0	4	0	8	0	205	6

=== International goals ===
Scores and results list Bulgaria's goal tally first.

No.	Date	Venue	Opponent	Score	Result	Competition
1.	8 September 2021	Vasil Levski National Stadium, Sofia, Bulgaria	Georgia	4–0	4–1	Friendly

== Honours ==
Slavia Sofia

- Bulgarian Cup (1): 2017–18

AC Reggiana 1919

- Serie C : 2022–23
