= 2023–24 SSC Bari season =

SSC Bari
2023–24 season
- Manager: Michele Mignani (until 9 October); Pasquale Marino (from 10 October to 5 February); Giuseppe Iachini (from 6 February to 15 April); Federico Giampaolo (from 15 April)
- Stadium: Stadio San Nicola
- Serie B: 16th
- Coppa Italia: Round of 64
- Average home league attendance: 17,366
- Biggest defeat: Bari 0–3 Parma
Home colours	Away colours
- All statistics correct as of 29 October 2023.

The 2023–24 season is SSC Bari's 116th season in existence and the club's second consecutive season in the second division of Italian football. In addition to the domestic league, Bari participated in this season's edition of the Coppa Italia. The season covers the period from 1 July 2023 to 30 June 2024.

== Players ==
=== First-team squad ===
As of 7 September 2023

Note: Flags indicate national team as defined under FIFA eligibility rules; some limited exceptions apply. Players may hold more than one non-FIFA nationality.

No.	Pos.	Nation	Player
1	GK	ITA	Alessandro Farroni (on loan from Vis Pesaro)
4	MF	ITA	Mattia Maita
5	DF	ITA	Emmanuele Matino
6	DF	ITA	Valerio Di Cesare (Captain)
7	FW	FRA	Jérémy Ménez
8	MF	LBY	Ahmad Benali
9	FW	ITA	Marco Nasti (on loan from Milan)
10	MF	ITA	Nicola Bellomo
11	FW	MAR	Ismail Achik
16	MF	ITA	Andrea Astrologo
17	MF	ITA	Raffaele Maiello
18	FW	ITA	Davide Diaw (on loan from Monza)
19	MF	ITA	Filippo Faggi
20	FW	ITA	Giuseppe Sibilli (on loan from Pisa)

No.	Pos.	Nation	Player
21	DF	SVN	Žan Žužek
22	GK	BRA	Brenno (on loan from Grêmio)
23	DF	ITA	Francesco Vicari
24	MF	FRA	Malcom Edjouma (on loan from FCSB)
25	DF	ITA	Raffaele Pucino
26	MF	GRE	Ilias Koutsoupias (on loan from Benevento)
31	DF	ITA	Giacomo Ricci
44	MF	ITA	Gennaro Acampora (on loan from Benevento)
49	MF	ITA	Mattia Aramu (on loan from Genoa)
74	FW	MNE	Matteo Ahmetaj
77	FW	ITA	Gregorio Morachioli
93	DF	ALG	Mehdi Dorval
99	DF	ITA	Gianluca Frabotta (on loan from Juventus)

=== Out on loan ===
Note: Flags indicate national team as defined under FIFA eligibility rules; some limited exceptions apply. Players may hold more than one non-FIFA nationality.

No.	Pos.	Nation	Player
—	DF	ITA	Daniele Celiento (at Casertana until 30 June 2024)
—	DF	ITA	Moussa Mané (at Recanatese until 30 June 2024)
—	MF	ITA	Andrea D'Errico (at Crotone until 30 June 2024)

No.	Pos.	Nation	Player
—	FW	ITA	Francesco Scafetta (at Messina until 30 June 2024)
—	FW	FRA	Aurélien Scheidler (at Andorra until 30 June 2024)
—	FW	ITA	Simone Simeri (at Carrarese until 30 June 2024)

== Transfers ==
=== In ===
Pos.	Player	Transferred from	Fee	Date	Source
GK	(Brazil) Brenno	(Brazil) Grêmio	Loan fee €500k	1 July 2023	
FW	(Morocco) Ismail Achik	(Italy) Cerignola	€300k	1 July 2023	
MF	(France) Malcom Edjouma	(Romania) FCSB	Loan fee €200k	1 July 2023	
FW	(Italy) Giuseppe Sibilli	(Italy) Pisa	Loan fee €200k	1 July 2023	
MF	(Italy) Andrea Astrologo	(Italy) Vis Pesaro	€100k	1 July 2023	
FW	(France) Jérémy Ménez	(Italy) Reggina	Free	1 July 2023	
MF	(Italy) Filippo Faggi	(Italy) Imolese	Free	1 July 2023	
MF	(Italy) Francesco Scafetta	(Italy) Vibonese	Free	1 July 2023	
MF	(Italy) Mattia Aramu	(Italy) Genoa	Loan	1 July 2023	
FW	(Italy) Davide Diaw	(Italy) Monza	Loan	1 July 2023	
DF	(Italy) Gianluca Frabotta	(Italy) Juventus	Loan	1 July 2023	
MF	(Greece) Ilias Koutsoupias	(Italy) Benevento	Loan	1 July 2023	
FW	(Italy) Marco Nasti	(Italy) Milan	Loan	1 July 2023	
MF	(Italy) Gennaro Acampora	(Italy) Benevento	Loan	1 July 2023	
GK	(Italy) Alessandro Farroni	(Italy) Vis Pesaro	Loan	1 July 2023	
GK	(Italy) Marco Pissardo	Unnattached	Free	1 July 2023	

=== Out ===
Pos.	Player	Transferred to	Fee	Date	Source
MF	(Italy) Salvatore Molina	Released		1 July 2023	
FW	(Colombia) Damir Cetir	Released		1 July 2023	
GK	(Italy) Edoardo Sarri	Released		1 July 2023	
FW	(Italy) Mirco Antenucci	(Italy) SPAL	Free	13 July 2023	
FW	(Italy) Simone Simeri	(Italy) Carrarese	Loan	14 July 2023	
DF	(Italy) Antonio Mazzotta	(Italy) Catania	Free	21 July 2023	
DF	(Italy) Marco Bosisio	(Italy) Renate	Undisclosed	22 July 2023	
GK	(Italy) Elia Caprile	(Italy) Napoli	€7.00m	24 July 2023	
MF	(Italy) Francesco Scafetta	(Italy) Messina	Loan	26 July 2023	
MF	(Argentina) Rubén Botta	(Argentina) Club Atlético Colón	Free	4 August 2023	
MF	(Italy) Manuel Marras	(Italy) Cosenza	Undisclosed	11 August 2023	
FW	(Morocco) Walid Cheddira	(Italy) Napoli	€7.00m	21 August 2023	
DF	(Italy) Marco Perrotta	(Italy) Padova	Undisclosed	26 August 2023	
GK	(Italy) Pierluigi Frattali	(Italy) Frosinone	Undisclosed	29 August 2023	
GK	(Italy) Emanuele Polverino	(Italy) Vis Pesaro	Free	1 September 2023	
MF	(Italy) Matteo Rossetti	(Italy) Vis Pesaro	Free	1 September 2023	
FW	(France) Aurélien Scheidler	FC Andorra	Loan	1 September 2023	
MF	(Italy) Andrea D'Errico	(Italy) Crotone	Loan	1 September 2023	
DF	(Italy) Daniele Celiento	(Italy) Casertana	Loan	7 September 2023	
MF	(Italy) Cristian Galano	(Italy) Brindisi	Free	15 September 2023	

== Competitions ==
=== Overview ===
Competition	First match	Last match	Starting round	Final position	Record							
Competition	First match	Last match	Starting round	Final position	Pld	W	D	L	GF	GA	GD	Win %
Serie B	18 August 2023	10 May 2024	Matchday 1		12	3	8	1	12	10	+2	25.00
Coppa Italia	12 August 2023		Round of 64	Round of 64	1	0	0	1	0	3	−3	0.00
Total					13	3	8	2	12	13	−1	23.08

Last updated: 4 November 2023
Source: Competitions

=== Serie B ===
==== League table ====
Pos	Team	Pld	W	D	L	GF	GA	GD	Pts	Promotion, qualification or relegation
15	Spezia	38	9	17	12	36	49	−13	44	
16	Ternana (R)	38	11	10	17	43	50	−7	43	Qualification for relegation play-out
17	Bari (O)	38	8	17	13	38	49	−11	41 (Note: Bari finished ahead of Ascoli on head-to-head points: Bari 1–0 Ascoli, Ascoli 2–2 Bari.)	Qualification for relegation play-out
18	Ascoli (R)	38	9	14	15	38	42	−4	41	Relegation to Serie C
19	Feralpisalò (R)	38	8	9	21	44	65	−21	33	Relegation to Serie C

Source: Soccerway (in English)
Rules for classification: 1) Points; 2) Head-to-head points; 3) Head-to-head goal difference; 4) Goal difference; 5) Goals scored; 6) Draw.
(Note: Head-to-head record is used only after all the matches between the teams in question have been played)
(O) Play-off winners; (R) Relegated

==== Results summary ====
Overall								Home						Away					
Pld	W	D	L	GF	GA	GD	Pts	W	D	L	GF	GA	GD	W	D	L	GF	GA	GD
22	5	12	5	23	25	−2	27	3	6	2	11	12	−1	2	6	3	12	13	−1

Last updated: 27 January 2024.
Source: Worldfootball

==== Results by round ====
Round	1	2	3	4	5	6	7	8	9	10	11	12	13	14	15	16	17	18	19	20	21	22	23
Ground	H	A	H	A	A	H	A	H	A	H	A	H	A	H	A	H	A	H	A	H	A	H	A
Result	D	W	D	D	D	D	L	D	D	D	W	W	D	L	L	W	L	D	D	W	D	L	
Position	11	9	8	7	10	9	12	12	12	14	10	9	10	10	12	9	11	11	11	11	11	12	

Updated to match(es) played on 27 January 2024. Source: Worldfootball
A = Away; H = Home; W = Win; D = Draw; L = Loss

==== Matches ====
The league fixtures were unveiled on 11 July 2023.

18 August 2023 1	Bari	0–0	Palermo	Bari
20:30 CEST (UTC+2)				Stadium: Stadio San Nicola; Referee: (Italy) Fabio Maresca

26 August 2023 2	Cremonese	0–1	Bari	Cremona
20:30 CEST (UTC+2)

30 August 2023 3	Bari	1–1	Cittadella	Bari
20:30 CEST (UTC+2)				Stadium: Stadio San Nicola

3 September 2023 4	Ternana	0–0	Bari	Terni
18:30 CEST (UTC+2)

16 September 2023 5	Pisa	1–1	Bari	Pisa
14:00 CEST (UTC+2)				Stadium: Arena Garibaldi

24 September 2023 6	Bari	2–2	Catanzaro	Bari
16:15 CEST (UTC+2)				Stadium: Stadio San Nicola

27 September 2023 7	Parma	2–1	Bari	Parma
20:30 CEST (UTC+2)				Stadium: Stadio Ennio Tardini

1 October 2023 8	Bari	1–1	Como	Bari
16:15 CEST (UTC+2)				Stadium: Stadio San Nicola

7 October 2023 9	Reggiana	1–1	Bari	Reggio Calabria
14:00 CEST (UTC+2)				Stadium: Mapei Stadium – Città del Tricolore

21 October 2023 10	Bari	1–1	Modena	Bari
14:00 CEST (UTC+2)				Stadium: Stadio San Nicola

29 October 2023 11	Brescia	1–2	Bari	Brescia
16:15 CEST (UTC+2)				Stadium: Stadio Mario Rigamonti

4 November 2023 12	Bari	1–0	Ascoli	Bari
14:00 CET (UTC+1)	Sibilli 80'			Stadium: Stadio San Nicola; Referee: Daniele Rutella

11 November 2023 13	Feralpisalò	3–3	Bari	Piacenza
14:00 CET (UTC+1)	Pizzignacco (yellow card) 11'; Di Cesare 51' (o.g.); Compagnon (yellow card) 62'; Zennaro 65' (yellow card) 67'; Sau 73'	Report	Nasti 7'; Di Cesare (yellow card) 22'; Diaw (yellow card) 42'; Sibilli 49'; Vicari (yellow card) 61'; Brenno (yellow card) 73'; Ismail Achik 79' (yellow card) 87'	Stadium: Stadio Leonardo Garilli; Attendance: 2,397; Referee: (Italy) Kevin Bonacina

25 November 2023 14	Bari	0–3	Venezia	Bari
14:00 CET (UTC+1)	Ahmad Benali (yellow card) 53'; Nasti (yellow card) 67'; Maita (yellow card) 80'	Report	Pierini 30'; Tessmann 90'; Dembélé 90+7'	Stadium: Stadio San Nicola; Attendance: 16,458; Referee: (Italy) Giuseppe Collu

3 December 2023 15	Lecco	1–0	Bari	Lecco
16:15 CET (UTC+1)	Celjak (yellow card) 9'; Novakovich (yellow card) 22'; Degli Innocenti (yellow card) 29'; Nicolò Buso 70'; Lorenzo Di Stefano (yellow card) 73'; Mats Leentje Lemmens (yellow card) 88'	Report	Nasti (yellow card) 40'; Vicari (yellow card) 64'; Dorval (yellow card) 90+5'	Stadium: Stadio Rigamonti-Ceppi; Attendance: 4,878; Referee: (Italy) Niccoló Baroni

9 December 2023 16	Bari	2–1	Südtirol	Bari
14:00 CET (UTC+1)	Acampora (yellow card) 20'; Sibilli 25' (pen.) (yellow card) 75'; Di Cesare 71'; Ricci (yellow card) 84'	Report	Ghiringhelli (yellow card) 13'; Cuomo (red card) 15'; Vinetot 36' (yellow card) 61'; Peeters (yellow card) 39'; Davì (yellow card) 75'	Stadium: Stadio San Nicola; Attendance: 13,583; Referee: (Italy) Francesco Cosso

15 December 2023 17	Spezia	1–0	Bari	La Spezia
20:30 CET (UTC+1)	Esposito (yellow card) 19'; Verde 84' (yellow card) 85'; Żurkowski (yellow card) 87' (yellow-red card) 90+4'; Elia (yellow card) 90'	Report	Ismail Achik (yellow card) 21'; Koutsoupias (yellow card) 40'; Maita (yellow card) 69'; Di Cesare (yellow card) 87'	Stadium: Stadio Alberto Picco; Attendance: 7,205; Referee: (Italy) Alessandro Prontera

23 December 2023 18	Bari	0–0	Cosenza	Bari
16:15 CET (UTC+1)	Di Cesare (yellow card) 12'; Ricci (yellow card) 16'; Ahmad Benali (yellow card) 31'; Nasti (yellow card) 48'; Sibilli (yellow card) 69'	Report	Florenzi (yellow card) 36'; Baldovino Cimino (yellow card) 58'; Praszelik (yellow card) 81' (yellow-red card) 90+3'	Stadium: Stadio San Nicola; Attendance: 17,646; Referee: (Italy) Matteo Gualtieri

26 December 2023 19	Sampdoria	1–1	Bari	Genoa
20:30 CET (UTC+1)	González (yellow card) 54'; Esposito 90+2'	Report	Maita (yellow card) 28'; Di Cesare (yellow card) 45+1'; Edjouma (yellow card) 72'; Sibilli 79'; Ménez (yellow card) 90+5' (yellow-red card) 90+5'	Stadium: Stadio Luigi Ferraris; Attendance: 22,978; Referee: (Italy) Livio Marinelli

13 January 2024 20	Bari	3–1	Ternana	Bari
14:00 CET (UTC+1)	Kallon (yellow card) 17'; Ricci 41'; Nasti 43'; Dorval 83'	Report	Łabojko (yellow card) 55'; Lorenzo Lucchesi (yellow card) 71'; Raimondo (yellow card) 81'; Diakité 86'	Stadium: Stadio San Nicola; Attendance: 13,928; Referee: (Italy) Daniele Perenzoni

21 January 2024 21	Ascoli	2–2	Bari	Ascoli Piceno
16:15 CET (UTC+1)	Falasco (yellow card) 30'; Di Tacchio (yellow card) 33'; Eric Botteghin (yellow card) 71'; Pedro Mendes 72' (pen.) 79'; Masini (yellow card) 90+2'	Report	Sibilli 9' (pen.); Nasti (yellow card) 15'; Edjouma 20' (yellow card) 37'; Kallon (yellow card) 39'; Ahmad Benali (yellow card) 64'; Dorval (yellow card) 71'	Stadium: Stadio Cino e Lillo Del Duca; Attendance: 7,689; Referee: (Italy) Davide Ghersini

27 January 2024 22	Bari	0–2	Reggiana	Bari
16:15 CET (UTC+1)	Ahmad Benali (yellow card) 61'; Nasti (yellow card) 89'	Report	Fiamozzi 23'; Antiste (yellow card) 39'; Bianco (yellow card) 40' (goal) 83'	Stadium: Stadio San Nicola; Attendance: 16,030; Referee: (Italy) Davide Di Marco

2 February 2024 23	Palermo	3–0	Bari	Palermo
20:30 CET (UTC+1)	Filippo Ranocchia 44'; Federico Di Francesco (yellow card) 68'; Pietro Ceccaroni 71'; Jacopo Segre 80'; Simon Graves (yellow card) 85'; Aljosa Vasic (yellow card) 90'	Report	Gennaro Acampora (yellow card) 27'; Raffaele Pucino (yellow card) 74'	Stadium: Stadio Renzo Barbera

10 February 2024 24	Bari	3–1	Lecco	Bari
16:15 CET (UTC+1)	Benali 26'; Pușcaș 53'; Sibilli 69'		Novakovich 81'	Stadium: Stadio San Nicola; Referee: Francesco Cosso

17 February 2024 25	Bari	v	Feralpisalò	Bari
14:00 CET (UTC+1)				Stadium: Stadio San Nicola

24 February 2024 26	Südtirol	v	Bari	Bolzano
14:00 CET (UTC+1)				Stadium: Stadio Druso

27 February 2024 27	Catanzaro	v	Bari	Catanzaro
20:30 CET (UTC+1)				Stadium: Stadio Nicola Ceravolo

2 March 2024 28	Bari	v	Spezia	Bari
--:-- CET (UTC+1)				Stadium: Stadio San Nicola

16 March 2024 30	Bari	v	Sampdoria	Bari
--:-- CET (UTC+1)				Stadium: Stadio San Nicola

6 April 2024 32	Bari	v	Cremonese	Bari
--:-- CEST (UTC+2)				Stadium: Stadio San Nicola

20 April 2024 34	Bari	v	Pisa	Bari
--:-- CEST (UTC+2)				Stadium: Stadio San Nicola

1 May 2024 36	Bari	v	Parma	Bari
--:-- CEST (UTC+2)				Stadium: Stadio San Nicola

10 May 2024 38	Bari	v	Brescia	Bari
--:-- CEST (UTC+2)				Stadium: Stadio San Nicola

=== Coppa Italia ===
12 August 2023 Round of 64	Bari	0–3	Parma	Bari
18:00 CEST (UTC+2)				Stadium: Stadio San Nicola

== See also ==
- History of SSC Bari
