= 2022–23 SSC Bari season =

SSC Bari
2022–23 season
- Owner: Filmauro S.r.l.
- Chairman: Luigi De Laurentiis
- Manager: Michele Mignani
- Stadium: Stadio San Nicola
- Serie B: 3rd
- Coppa Italia: Round of 32
- Top goalscorer: League: Walid Cheddira (14); All: Walid Cheddira (19)
Home colours	Away colours	Third colours

The 2022–23 season was the 115th in the history of SSC Bari and their first season back in the second division since 2018. The club participated in Serie B and the Coppa Italia.

== Players ==
As of 31 January 2023

Note: Flags indicate national team as defined under FIFA eligibility rules; some limited exceptions apply. Players may hold more than one non-FIFA nationality.

No.	Pos.	Nation	Player
1	GK	ITA	Pierluigi Frattali
4	MF	ITA	Mattia Maita
5	DF	ITA	Emmanuele Matino (on loan from Potenza)
6	DF	ITA	Valerio Di Cesare (Captain)
7	FW	ITA	Mirco Antenucci
8	MF	LBA	Ahmad Benali
9	FW	ITA	Sebastiano Esposito (on loan from Inter Milan)
10	MF	ARG	Rubén Botta
11	FW	MAR	Walid Cheddira
14	FW	ITA	Gregorio Morachioli
17	MF	ITA	Raffaele Maiello
18	GK	ITA	Elia Caprile
19	FW	ITA	Cristian Galano
21	DF	SLO	Žan Žužek
22	GK	ITA	Edoardo Sarri

No.	Pos.	Nation	Player
23	DF	ITA	Francesco Vicari
25	DF	ITA	Raffaele Pucino
26	FW	FRA	Aurélien Scheidler
27	DF	ITA	Antonio Mazzotta
30	FW	COL	Damir Ceter
31	DF	ITA	Giacomo Ricci
44	DF	ITA	Marco Bosisio
63	MF	ITA	Nicola Bellomo
79	MF	ITA	Salvatore Molina
80	DF	ITA	Leonardo Benedetti (on loan from Sampdoria)
90	MF	ITA	Michael Folorunsho (on loan from Napoli)
93	DF	FRA	Mehdi Dorval
99	MF	ITA	Alessandro Mallamo (on loan from Atalanta)
—	FW	MNE	Matteo Ahmetaj

=== Out on loan ===
Note: Flags indicate national team as defined under FIFA eligibility rules; some limited exceptions apply. Players may hold more than one non-FIFA nationality.

No.	Pos.	Nation	Player
—	GK	ITA	Emanuele Polverino (at Fidelis Andria)
—	DF	ITA	Daniele Celiento (at Cesena)
—	DF	ITA	Marco Perrotta (at Pro Vercelli)
—	MF	ITA	Moussa Manè (at Montevarchi)

No.	Pos.	Nation	Player
—	MF	ITA	Andrea D'Errico (at Crotone)
—	MF	ITA	Matteo Rossetti (at Rimini)
—	FW	ITA	Manuel Marras (at Cosenza)
—	FW	ITA	Simone Simeri (at Imolese)

== Transfers ==
=== In ===
Pos.	Player	Transferred from	Fee	Date	Source
FW	(Morocco) Walid Cheddira	(Italy) Parma	Undisclosed	1 July 2022	
FW	(France) Aurélien Scheidler	(France) Dijon	Undisclosed	1 September 2022	
GK	(Italy) Edoardo Sarri	(Italy) Juve Stabia	Undisclosed	27 January 2023	
FW	(Italy) Sebastiano Esposito	(Italy) Internazionale	Loan	31 January 2023	
MF	(Libya) Ahmad Benali	(Italy) Brescia	Undisclosed	31 January 2023	

== Pre-season and friendlies ==
Win Draw Loss Fixtures

17 July 2022 Friendly	Bari (Italy)	15–0	(Italy) San Giovanni Teatino	Roccaraso
17:30 CEST (UTC+2)				Stadium: Campo Sportivo di Piazzale Meazza

23 July 2022 Friendly	Frosinone (Italy)	1–0	(Italy) Bari	Frosinone
18:00 CEST (UTC+2)				Stadium: Stadio Benito Stirpe

== Competitions ==
=== Overall record ===
Competition	First match	Last match	Starting round	Final position	Record							
Competition	First match	Last match	Starting round	Final position	Pld	W	D	L	GF	GA	GD	Win %
Serie B	12 August 2022	19 May 2023	Matchday 1	3rd	38	17	14	7	58	37	+21	44.74
Coppa Italia	31 July 2022	19 October 2023	Preliminary round	Round of 32	3	2	0	1	7	2	+5	66.67
Total					41	19	14	8	65	39	+26	46.34

Source: Soccerway

=== Serie B ===
==== League table ====
Pos	Team	Pld	W	D	L	GF	GA	GD	Pts	Promotion, qualification or relegation
1	Frosinone (C, P)	38	24	8	6	63	26	+37	80	Promotion to Serie A
2	Genoa (Note: Genoa were deducted one point due to income tax payment irregularities.) (P)	38	21	11	6	53	28	+25	73	Promotion to Serie A
3	Bari	38	17	14	7	58	37	+21	65	Qualification for promotion play-offs semi-finals
4	Parma (Note: Parma were deducted one point for missing the deadline to fulfil obligations for February taxes on the salary bill.)	38	17	10	11	48	39	+9	60 (Note: Parma finished ahead of Cagliari on head-to-head points: Cagliari 1–1 Parma, Parma 2–1 Cagliari.)	Qualification for promotion play-offs semi-finals
5	Cagliari (O, P)	38	15	15	8	50	34	+16	60	Qualification for promotion play-offs preliminary round

Source: Soccerway (in English)
Rules for classification: 1) Points; 2) Head-to-head points; 3) Head-to-head goal difference; 4) Goal difference; 5) Goals scored; 6) Draw.
(C) Champions; (O) Play-off winners; (P) Promoted

==== Results summary ====
Overall								Home						Away					
Pld	W	D	L	GF	GA	GD	Pts	W	D	L	GF	GA	GD	W	D	L	GF	GA	GD
30	13	11	6	45	28	+17	50	5	7	3	24	16	+8	8	4	3	21	12	+9

Last updated: 19 March 2023.
Source: Serie B

==== Results by round ====
Round	1	2	3	4	5	6	7	8	9	10	11	12	13	14	15	16	17	18	19	20	21	22	23	24	25	26	27	28	29	30	31
Ground	A	H	A	H	A	A	H	A	H	A	H	A	H	A	H	A	H	A	H	H	A	H	A	H	H	A	H	A	H	A	H
Result	D	D	W	D	W	W	W	W	L	L	D	D	D	D	D	W	W	D	L	W	L	L	W	W	D	W	W	W	D	L	
Position	10	13	7	9	5	4	2	2	4	5	5	5	6	5	5	4	3	3	4	4	4	4	3	3	3	3	3	3	3	4	

Updated to match(es) played on 19 March 2023. Source: Serie B
A = Away; H = Home; W = Win; D = Draw; L = Loss

==== Matches ====
The league fixtures were announced on 15 July 2022.

12 August 2022 1	Parma	2–2	Bari	Parma
20:45 CEST (UTC+2)	Man 3'; Estévez (yellow card) 8'; Valenti (yellow card) 38'; Mihăilă 45+2' (yellow card) 45+2'; Adrián Bernabé (yellow card) 54'; Del Prato (yellow card) 90'	Report	Terranova (yellow card) 3'; Antenucci 11' (pen.); Folorunsho 35'; Cheddira (yellow card) 38'; Mallamo (yellow card) 79'	Stadium: Stadio Ennio Tardini; Attendance: 11,459; Referee: (Italy) Davide Massa

19 August 2022 2	Bari	1–1	Palermo	Bari
20:45 CEST (UTC+2)	Maita (yellow card) 24'; Cheddira 68'; Di Cesare (yellow card) 77'	Report	Buttaro (yellow card) 18'; Valente 37' (yellow card) 50'; Marconi (red card) 87'	Stadium: Stadio San Nicola; Attendance: 35,377; Referee: (Italy) Giacomo Camplone

28 August 2022 3	Perugia	1–3	Bari	Perugia
20:45 CEST (UTC+2)	Dell'Orco (yellow card) 5'; Kouan (yellow card) 42'; Sgarbi (yellow card) 55' (yellow-red card) 63'; Strizzolo 57'; Olivieri (yellow card) 61'; Casasola (yellow card) 65'	Report	Folorunsho 10'; Ricci (yellow card) 33' (yellow-red card) 65'; Cheddira 54'; Di Cesare (yellow card) 67'; D'Errico (yellow card) 68'; Antenucci 69'	Stadium: Stadio Renato Curi; Attendance: 5,534; Referee: (Italy) Simone Sozza

3 September 2022 4	Bari	2–2	SPAL	Bari
14:00 CEST (UTC+2)	Cheddira 4'; Maita (yellow card) 36'; Antenucci 45+2'; Bellomo (yellow card) 47'	Report	Dalle Mura (yellow card) 12'; Dickmann (yellow card) 44'; Meccariello (yellow card) 55'; La Mantia 63'; Rabbi 69'	Stadium: Stadio San Nicola; Attendance: 18,103; Referee: (Italy) Andrea Rapuano

10 September 2022 5	Cosenza	0–1	Bari	Cosenza
14:00 CEST (UTC+2)	Florenzi (yellow card) 61' (yellow-red card) 89'; Zilli (yellow card) 85'; Väisänen (yellow card) 90+4'; Brignola (yellow card) 90+6'	Report	Cheddira 45+4'; Di Cesare (yellow card) 73'; Cangiano (yellow card) 90+1'; Folorunsho (yellow card) 90+6'	Stadium: Stadio San Vito-Gigi Marulla; Attendance: 9,149; Referee: (Italy) Matteo Gariglio

17 September 2022 6	Cagliari	0–1	Bari	Cagliari
14:00 CEST (UTC+2)	Rog (yellow card) 29'; Carboni (yellow card) 58'; Millico (yellow card) 90+3'	Report	Ricci (yellow card) 35'; Cheddira 77'; Pucino (red card) 84'	Stadium: Unipol Domus; Attendance: 14,087; Referee: (Italy) Francesco Fourneau

1 October 2022 7	Bari	6–2	Brescia	Bari
14:00 CEST (UTC+2)	Folorunsho 7' (yellow card) 24'; Bellomo 26'; Cheddira 43' 55'; D'Errico (yellow card) 64'; Antenucci 68'; Scheidler 77'	Report	Mangraviti (yellow card) 23'; Bertagnoli (yellow card) 45'; Ahmad Benali (yellow card) 46'; Ndoj (yellow card) 67'; Karačić (yellow card) 70'; Olzer 86'; Moreo 90+1'	Stadium: Stadio San Nicola; Attendance: 23,926; Referee: (Italy) Emanno Feliciani

8 October 2022 8	Venezia	1–2	Bari	Venice
14:00 CEST (UTC+2)	Haps (yellow card) 59'; Ceccaroni 70'; Joronen (yellow card) 81'; Modolo (yellow card) 90+5'	Report	Antenucci 46' (yellow card) 49'; Di Cesare (yellow card) 56'; Pucino (yellow card) 59'; Cheddira 83' (pen.)	Stadium: Stadio Pier Luigi Penzo; Attendance: 6,473; Referee: (Italy) Antonio Giua

15 October 2022 9	Bari	0–2	Ascoli	Bari
16:15 CEST (UTC+2)	Di Cesare (yellow card) 15'; Folorunsho (yellow card) 35'; Benedetti (yellow card) 64'; D'Errico (yellow card) 87'	Report	Giovane (yellow card) 18'; Quaranta (yellow card) 52'; Dionisi (yellow card) 55' (goal) 89'; Gondo (yellow card) 60' (yellow-red card) 90+2'; Šimić 78'	Stadium: Stadio San Nicola; Attendance: 31,582; Referee: (Italy) Daniele Rutella

22 October 2022 10	Frosinone	1–0	Bari	Frosinone
14:00 CEST (UTC+2)	Mazzitelli (yellow card) 32'; Moro (yellow card) 61'; Frabotta (yellow card) 71'; Rohdén (yellow card) 80'; Borrelli 90+2' (yellow card) 90+4'	Report	Bellomo (red card) 21'; Folorunsho (yellow card) 25'; Mallamo (yellow card) 39'; Ricci (yellow card) 44'	Stadium: Stadio Benito Stirpe; Attendance: 11,239; Referee: (Italy) Daniele Perenzoni

28 October 2022 11	Bari	0–0	Ternana	Bari
20:30 CEST (UTC+2)	Maiello (yellow card) 33'; Maita (yellow card) 69'; Di Cesare (yellow card) 89'	Report	Di Tacchio (yellow card) 35'; Favilli (yellow card) 79'	Stadium: Stadio San Nicola; Attendance: 38,800; Referee: (Italy) Matteo Marcenaro

5 November 2022 12	Benevento	1–1	Bari	Benevento
14:00 CET (UTC+1)	Forte (yellow card) 31'; Improta 37'; Pastina (yellow card) 41' (yellow-red card) 79'; Capellini (yellow card) 79'; Letizia (yellow card) 85'	Report	Folorunsho (yellow card) 13'; Maita (yellow card) 41'; Maiello (yellow card) 43'; Di Cesare (yellow card) 51'; Cheddira 77' (pen.)	Stadium: Stadio Ciro Vigorito; Attendance: 9,018; Referee: (Italy) Giacomo Camplone

12 November 2022 13	Bari	2–2	Südtirol	Bari
14:00 CET (UTC+1)	Di Cesare 43'; Salcedo 65'; Maita (yellow card) 90+2'	Report	Tait 21'; Odogwu 37'; De Col (yellow card) 90+3'	Stadium: Stadio San Nicola; Attendance: 18,493; Referee: (Italy) Lorenzo Maggioni

27 November 2022 14	Como	1–1	Bari	Como
15:00 CET (UTC+1)	Cagnano (yellow card) 32'; Cerri (yellow card) 36' (goal) 45+2' (pen.); Mancuso (yellow card) 82'	Report	Antenucci (yellow card) 14'; Folorunsho (yellow card) 32'; Pucino (yellow card) 85'; Botta 90' (pen.); Ceter (yellow card) 90+4'	Stadium: Stadio Giuseppe Sinigaglia; Attendance: 4,870; Referee: (Italy) Egidio Marchetti

4 December 2022 15	Bari	0–0	Pisa	Bari
15:00 CET (UTC+1)	Vicari (yellow card) 34'; Scheidler (yellow card) 45'; Maiello (yellow card) 70'	Report	Rus (yellow card) 28' (yellow-red card) 76'	Stadium: Stadio San Nicola; Attendance: 16,278; Referee: (Italy) Francesco Cosso

8 December 2022 16	Cittadella	0–3	Bari	Cittadella
15:00 CET (UTC+1)	Lores (yellow card) 39'; Mastrantonio (yellow card) 45+2'; Carriero (yellow card) 84'	Report	Scheidler 13'; Folorunsho 32'; Maita 68'; Maiello (yellow card) 84'	Stadium: Stadio Pier Cesare Tombolato; Attendance: 3,539; Referee: (Italy) Marco Piccinini

11 December 2022 17	Bari	4–1	Modena	Bari
18:00 CET (UTC+1)	Botta 6'; Folorunsho 21'; Maiello (yellow card) 26' (yellow-red card) 29'; Cittadini 54' (o.g.); Caprile (yellow card) 68'; Mallamo (yellow card) 90'; Di Cesare 90+1'	Report	Cittadini (yellow card) 25'; Gerli (yellow card) 35'; Diaw 90+5'	Stadium: Stadio San Nicola; Attendance: 18,115; Referee: (Italy) Gianluca Aureliano

17 December 2022 18	Reggina	0–0	Bari	Reggio Calabria
20:30 CET (UTC+1)	Majer (yellow card) 26'	Report	Di Cesare (yellow card) 24'; Bellomo (yellow card) 45+5'; Maita (yellow card) 49'; Pucino (yellow card) 70'	Stadium: Stadio Oreste Granillo; Attendance: 15,657; Referee: (Italy) Michael Fabbri

26 December 2022 19	Bari	1–2	Genoa	Bari
20:30 CET (UTC+1)	Cheddira 33'; Benedetti (yellow card) 43'; Folorunsho (yellow card) 50'; Botta (yellow card) 57'; Maita (yellow card) 65'; Bellomo (yellow card) 90+6'	Report	Pușcaș 2'; Aramu (yellow card) 50'; Guðmundsson 58'; Drăgușin (yellow card) 61'	Stadium: Stadio San Nicola; Attendance: 48,827; Referee: (Italy) Maurizio Mariani

14 January 2023 20	Bari	4–0	Parma	Bari
14:00 CET (UTC+1)	Balogh 5' (o.g.); Cheddira 13' (pen.) 43' (pen.); Salcedo 90+3'	Report	Camara (yellow card) 64'; Valenti (yellow card) 70'	Stadium: Stadio San Nicola; Attendance: 17,232; Referee: (Italy) Niccolo Baroni

20 January 2023 21	Palermo	1–0	Bari	Palermo
20:30 CET (UTC+1)	Damiani (yellow card) 44'; Šarić (yellow card) 53'; Marconi 82'; Sala (yellow card) 86'; Nedelcearu (yellow card) 90+6'	Report	Maita (yellow card) 24'; Mazzotta (yellow card) 81'; Cheddira (yellow card) 86' (yellow-red card) 89'; Benedetti (yellow card) 90+3'	Stadium: Stadio Renzo Barbera; Attendance: 15,747; Referee: (Italy) Luca Massimi

28 January 2023 22	Bari	0–2	Perugia	Bari
14:00 CET (UTC+1)	Antenucci (yellow card) 33'	Report	Dell'Orco (yellow card) 19'; Paz (yellow card) 26'; Curado (yellow card) 44'; Di Serio (yellow card) 67' (goal) 75' 81'	Stadium: Stadio San Nicola; Attendance: 13,717; Referee: (Italy) Luca Zufferli

4 February 2023 23	SPAL	3–4	Bari	Ferrara
14:00 CET (UTC+1)	Moncini 62'; Nainggolan 81'; Celia 83'	Report	Folorunsho 20' (yellow card) 45+1'; Esposito 26'; Cheddira 56'; Antenucci 67'; Bellomo (yellow card) 90'; Mazzotta (yellow card) 90+2'	Stadium: Stadio Paolo Mazza; Attendance: 8,773; Referee: (Italy) Rosario Abisso

12 February 2023 24	Bari	2–1	Cosenza	Bari
16:15 CET (UTC+1)	Esposito 3' (yellow card) 45+3'; Cheddira 69'; Maita (yellow card) 74'; Ahmad Benali (yellow card) 79'; Mazzotta (yellow card) 90+6'	Report	Rispoli 24' (yellow card) 90+4'; Väisänen (yellow card) 28'; Rigione (yellow card) 45'; Marras (yellow card) 45+3'; Micai (yellow card) 59'	Stadium: Stadio San Nicola; Referee: (Italy) Daniele Rutella

18 February 2023 25	Bari	1–1	Cagliari	Bari
16:15 CET (UTC+1)	Botta (yellow card) 35'; Antenucci 90+5' (pen.)	Report	Lapadula 2' (yellow card) 34' (yellow-red card) 56'; Goldaniga (yellow card) 32'; Zappa (yellow card) 77'; Millico (yellow card) 90'	Stadium: Stadio San Nicola; Attendance: 20,260; Referee: (Italy) Davide Massa

25 February 2023 26	Brescia	0–2	Bari	Brescia
14:00 CET (UTC+1)	Ndoj (yellow card) 71'; van de Looi (yellow card) 77'	Report	Benedetti 21'; Maita (yellow card) 84'; Scheidler 90+3'	Stadium: Stadio Mario Rigamonti; Attendance: 4,648; Referee: (Italy) Antonio Giua

1 March 2023 27	Bari	1–0	Venezia	Bari
20:30 CET (UTC+1)	Di Cesare (yellow card) 5'; Bellomo 63'	Report	Carboni (yellow card) 26'; Svoboda (yellow card) 83'	Stadium: Stadio San Nicola; Attendance: 20,430; Referee: (Italy) Luca Massimi

5 March 2023 28	Ascoli	0–1	Bari	Ascoli Piceno
15:00 CET (UTC+1)	Falasco (yellow card) 13' (yellow-red card) 42'; Giovane (yellow card) 17'	Report	Cheddira 45+3' (pen.); Maita (yellow card) 61'	Stadium: Stadio Cino e Lillo Del Duca; Attendance: 8,857; Referee: (Italy) Rosario Abisso

=== Coppa Italia ===
31 July 2022 Preliminary round	Bari	3–0	Padova	Salerno
21:00 CEST (UTC+2)	Botta 8'; Cheddira 16', 90+2'	Report		Stadium: Stadio Arechi; Attendance: 1,000; Referee: Federico Dionisi

7 August 2022 Round of 64	Hellas Verona	1–4	Bari	Verona
18:00 CEST (UTC+2)	Lasagna 16'; Lazovic (yellow card) 47'; Faraoni (red card) 69'	Report	Di Cesare (yellow card) 24'; Folorunsho 30'; Cheddira 44', 53' (pen.), 78'; Bellomo (yellow card) 85'	Stadium: Stadio Marcantonio Bentegodi; Attendance: 6,576; Referee: Niccolò Baroni

19 October 2022 Round of 32	Parma	1–0	Bari	Parma
18:00 CEST (UTC+2)	Benedyczak 29'	Report		Stadium: Stadio Ennio Tardini; Attendance: 4,690; Referee: Marco Serra
