= List of Italian football transfers winter 2022–23 =

The 2022–23 Italian football winter transfer window ran from 2 to 31 January 2023. This list includes transfers featuring at least one club from either Serie A or Serie B that were completed after the end of the summer 2022 transfer window on 30 September 2022 and before the end of the winter 2022–23 window on 31 January.

== Transfers ==
All players and clubs without a flag are Italian.

Legend

- Italic text indicates that the player already left the team on loan, in this or the previous season, or was a new signing who immediately left the club.

Date	Name	Moving from	Moving to	Fee
27 October 2022	(Colombia) Brayan Vera	Lecce	(Colombia) América de Cali	Undisclosed (Note: The player already played for his new club in the first part of the season, the deal turned from temporary to definitive.)
23 November 2022	(Norway) Ola Solbakken	(Norway) Bodø/Glimt	Roma	Free
2 December 2022	(Portugal) João Moutinho	(United States) Orlando	Spezia	Free
16 December 2022	Filippo Tripi	Roma	(Slovenia) Mura	Undisclosed
23 December 2022	(Mexico) Guillermo Ochoa	(Mexico) América	Salernitana	Free
27 December 2022	Domenico Criscito	(Canada) Toronto	Genoa	Free
30 December 2022	(Serbia) Dimitrije Kamenović	Lazio	(Czech Republic) Sparta Prague	Loan
2 January 2023	Alex Ferrari	Sampdoria	Cremonese	Loan
2 January 2023	Francesco Caputo	Sampdoria	Empoli	Loan
2 January 2023	(Netherlands) Sam Lammers	Atalanta	Sampdoria	Loan
2 January 2023	(Netherlands) Bram Nuytinck	Udinese	Sampdoria	Undisclosed
2 January 2023	(Greece) Antonis Siatounis	Monza	Virtus Entella	Undisclosed
2 January 2023	Alessandro Micai	Salernitana	Cosenza	Undisclosed
2 January 2023	Andrea Vallocchia	Cosenza	Reggiana	Undisclosed
3 January 2023	(Colombia) Devis Vásquez	(Paraguay) Guaraní	Milan	Undisclosed
3 January 2023	(Morocco) Youssef Maleh	Fiorentina	Lecce	Loan
3 January 2023	Andrea Accardi	Palermo	Piacenza	Undisclosed
3 January 2023	Salvatore Santoro	Pisa	Monterosi	Loan
3 January 2023	Davide Voltan	Südtirol	FeralpiSalò	Loan
4 January 2023	(Serbia) Mladen Devetak	Palermo	Viterbese	Loan
4 January 2023	Manuel Peretti	Palermo	Recanatese	Loan
4 January 2023	Luca Chierico	Genoa	Piacenza	Loan
5 January 2023	Christian Capone	Atalanta	Reggiana	Loan
5 January 2023	Hans Nicolussi	Juventus	Salernitana	Loan
5 January 2023	Alessandro Celli	Ternana	Südtirol	Loan
5 January 2023	(Serbia) Vladan Dekić	Pisa	Viterbese	Undisclosed
5 January 2023	Antonio Satriano	Roma	(Netherlands) Heracles Almelo	Undisclosed
6 January 2023	Salvatore Esposito	S.P.A.L.	Spezia	Loan
6 January 2023	Roberto Crivello	Palermo	Padova	Loan
6 January 2023	Roberto Floriano	Palermo	Sangiuliano	Undisclosed
6 January 2023	Alessandro Salvi	Ascoli	Cittadella	Undisclosed
6 January 2023	Danilo Giacinto Ventola	Ascoli	Fidelis Andria	Loan
6 January 2023	Eugenio D'Ursi	Napoli	Crotone	Undisclosed
6 January 2023	Daniele Paponi	Bari	Imolese	Undisclosed
6 January 2023	Simone Simeri	Bari	Imolese	Loan
6 January 2023	(Moldova) Andrei Moțoc	Salernitana	Siena	Loan
6 January 2023	(Romania) Eduard Duțu	Fiorentina	Gubbio	Loan
7 January 2023	Alessandro Zanoli	Napoli	Sampdoria	Loan
7 January 2023	(Poland) Bartosz Bereszyński	Sampdoria	Napoli	Loan
7 January 2023	Andrea Marino	Lazio	Fidelis Andria	Loan
7 January 2023	Gabriele Piccinini	Pisa	Fiorenzuola	Loan
7 January 2023	Francesco Luciani	Ascoli	Ravenna	Loan
9 January 2023	(Ukraine) Ruslan Malinovskyi	Atalanta	(France) Olympique de Marseille	Loan
9 January 2023	Tommy Maistrello	Renate	Cittadella	Loan
9 January 2023	Andrea D'Errico	Bari	Crotone	Loan
9 January 2023	Francesco Orlando	Salernitana	Siena	Loan
10 January 2023	(Argentina) Facundo Zabala	Venezia	(Paraguay) Club Olimpia	Loan
10 January 2023	(Denmark) Andreas Jungdal	Milan	(Austria) Altach	Loan
10 January 2023	(Croatia) Mato Jajalo	Udinese	Venezia	Undisclosed
10 January 2023	Giovanni Crociata	Empoli	Cittadella	Loan
10 January 2023	Luca Strizzolo	Cremonese	Modena	Loan
10 January 2023	(Brazil) Leonardo Pereira	Unattached	Modena	Free
10 January 2023	Agostino Camigliano	Cosenza	Ancona	Undisclosed
10 January 2023	Ciro Panico	Cosenza	FeralpiSalò	Loan
10 January 2023	Filippo Delli Carri	Como	Padova	Loan
11 January 2023	(Brazil) Matheus Martins	(Brazil) Fluminense	Udinese	Undisclosed
11 January 2023	(Brazil) Matheus Martins	Udinese	(England) Watford	Loan
12 January 2023	(Uruguay) Renzo Orihuela	(Uruguay) Montevideo City Torque	Palermo	Loan
12 January 2023	(Brazil) Paulo Azzi	Modena	Cagliari	Undisclosed
12 January 2023	Gianmarco Cangiano	Bologna	(Netherlands) Fortuna Sittard	Loan
12 January 2023	Alberto Barison	Südtirol	Trento	Loan
12 January 2023	Gabriel Lunetta	(Croatia) Rijeka	Südtirol	Loan
12 January 2023	(Poland) Szymon Żurkowski	Fiorentina	Spezia	Loan
12 January 2023	Samuele Spalluto	Fiorentina	Novara	Loan
13 January 2023	Pietro Rovaglia	Ternana	Aquila Montevarchi	Loan
13 January 2023	Giacomo Beretta	Cittadella	Foggia	Undisclosed
13 January 2023	Alessandro Iacobucci	Südtirol	Vicenza	Undisclosed
13 January 2023	Stefano Minelli	Cesena	Südtirol	Loan
13 January 2023	(Ukraine) Nikita Contini	Napoli	Reggina	Loan
13 January 2023	(Slovenia) Martin Turk	Parma	Sampdoria	Loan
13 January 2023	(Uruguay) Jaime Báez	Cremonese	Frosinone	Undisclosed
13 January 2023	(France) Aurélien Nguiamba	Spezia	(Poland) Jagiellonia Białystok	Loan
13 January 2023	(Portugal) Leandro Sanca	Spezia	(Portugal) Famalicão	Loan
13 January 2023	(Spain) Gonzalo Villar	Roma	(Spain) Getafe	Loan
13 January 2023	Edoardo Pierozzi	Fiorentina	Como	Loan
14 January 2023	(Uruguay) Gastón Pereiro	Cagliari	(Uruguay) Nacional	Loan
14 January 2023	Alessandro Cortinovis	Atalanta	Cosenza	Loan
14 January 2023	Andrea Giorgini	Latina	Südtirol	Undisclosed
14 January 2023	(Senegal) Babacar Diop	Novara	Venezia	Undisclosed
15 January 2023	(Senegal) Maissa Ndiaye	Cremonese	Vicenza	Loan
16 January 2023	(Netherlands) Jayden Braaf	(Germany) Borussia Dortmund II	Verona	Loan
16 January 2023	(Netherlands) Deyovaisio Zeefuik	(Germany) Hertha BSC	Verona	Loan
16 January 2023	(France) Lucas Da Cunha	(France) Nice	Como	Undisclosed
16 January 2023	Mattia Finotto	S.P.A.L.	Cosenza	Undisclosed
17 January 2023	Tommaso Cassandro	Cittadella	Lecce	Undisclosed
17 January 2023	(Slovenia) Tom Kljun	(Slovenia) Tabor Sežana	Lecce	Undisclosed
17 January 2023	(Sweden) Aimar Sher	Spezia	(Netherlands) Groningen	Loan
17 January 2023	Masimiliano Doda	Palermo	Imolese	Loan
18 January 2023	Giuseppe Ambrosino	Napoli	Cittadella	Loan
18 January 2023	Kelvin Yeboah	Genoa	(Germany) FC Augsburg	Loan
18 January 2023	(Sweden) John Björkengren	Lecce	Brescia	Loan
18 January 2023	Manuel Marras	Bari	Cosenza	Loan
18 January 2023	Enrico Celeghin	Como	Triestina	Loan
18 January 2023	Gennaro Tutino	Parma	Palermo	Loan
19 January 2023	(Belgium) Cyril Ngonge	(Netherlands) Groningen	Verona	Undisclosed
19 January 2023	(Turkey) Mert Çetin	Verona	(Turkey) Adana Demirspor	Loan
19 January 2023	(Norway) Julian Kristoffersen	Salernitana	Virtus Verona	Loan
19 January 2023	(Montenegro) Ognjen Stijepović	Spezia	(Slovenia) Mura	Undisclosed
19 January 2023	(Slovenia) Tio Cipot	(Slovenia) Mura	Spezia	Undisclosed
19 January 2023	(France) Guillaume Gigliotti	Bari	Crotone	Loan
19 January 2023	(The Gambia) Musa Juwara	Bologna	(Denmark) Odense	Loan
19 January 2023	(Spain) Mamadou Tounkara	Cittadella	Avellino	Undisclosed
19 January 2023	Davide Mazzocco	Cittadella	Avellino	Undisclosed
19 January 2023	Marco Benassi	Fiorentina	Cremonese	Loan
20 January 2023	(Spain) Pablo Rodríguez	Lecce	Brescia	Loan
20 January 2023	Nicholas Rizzo	Genoa	Pro Vercelli	Loan
20 January 2023	Elia Petrelli	Genoa	Siena	Loan
20 January 2023	Camillo Tavernelli	Cittadella	Triestina	Loan
20 January 2023	(Iceland) Bjarki Steinn Bjarkason	Venezia	Foggia	Loan
20 January 2023	Stefano Moreo	Brescia	Pisa	Undisclosed
20 January 2023	(Latvia) Raimonds Krollis	(Latvia) Valmiera	Spezia	Undisclosed
21 January 2023	Federico Marchetti	Unattached	Spezia	Free
22 January 2023	(Greece) Giannis Fetfatzidis	(Qatar) Al-Sailiya	S.P.A.L.	Undisclosed
23 January 2023	(Poland) Jakub Kiwior	Spezia	(England) Arsenal	Undisclosed
23 January 2023	Federico Proia	Vicenza	Ascoli	Loan
24 January 2023	Stefano Pettinari	Ternana	Benevento	Loan
24 January 2023	Francesco Forte	Benevento	Ascoli	Loan
24 January 2023	(Argentina) Franco Carboni	Inter	Monza	Loan
24 January 2023	(Nigeria) William Troost-Ekong	(England) Watford	Salernitana	Loan
25 January 2023	Salvatore Sirigu	Napoli	Fiorentina	Undisclosed
25 January 2023	(Romania) Ionuț Radu	Inter	(France) Auxerre	Loan
25 January 2023	(Austria) Maximilian Ullmann	Venezia	(Germany) 1. FC Magdeburg	Loan
25 January 2023	Tommaso D'Orazio	Südtirol	Cosenza	Loan
25 January 2023	Pierluigi Gollini	Atalanta	Napoli	Loan
25 January 2023	(Spain) Raúl Moro	Lazio	(Spain) Oviedo	Loan
25 January 2023	(Argentina) Gonzalo Escalante	Lazio	(Spain) Cádiz	Loan
26 January 2023	(Slovenia) Domen Črnigoj	Venezia	Salernitana	Loan
26 January 2023	(Netherlands) Denso Kasius	Bologna	(Austria) Rapid Wien	Loan
26 January 2023	(Romania) Denis Drăguș	(Belgium) Standard Liège	Genoa	Loan
26 January 2023	(Poland) Marcin Listkowski	Lecce	Brescia	Loan
26 January 2023	(Poland) Mateusz Praszelik	Verona	Cosenza	Loan
26 January 2023	(Poland) Przemysław Wiśniewski	Venezia	Spezia	Undisclosed
26 January 2023	(Iceland) Mikael Egill Ellertsson	Spezia	Venezia	Undisclosed
26 January 2023	(Bulgaria) Petko Hristov	Spezia	Venezia	Loan
26 January 2023	Andrea Beghetto	Pisa	Venezia	Loan
27 January 2023	(Germany) Nick Salihamidžić	(Germany) Bayern Munich II	Cosenza	Loan
27 January 2023	(Senegal) Alfred Gomis	Rennais	Como	Loan
27 January 2023	(Canada) Sebastian Breza	Bologna	Carrarese	Loan
27 January 2023	(Finland) Lauri Ala-Myllymäki	Venezia	(Finland) Ilves	Undisclosed
27 January 2023	Marco Fiorani	Vis Pesaro	Venezia	Undisclosed
27 January 2023	(Scotland) Harvey St Clair	Venezia	Vis Pesaro	Undisclosed
27 January 2023	Riccardo Ciervo	Sassuolo	Venezia	Loan
27 January 2023	Gabriel Meli	Empoli	Recanatese	Loan
27 January 2023	Edoardo Sarri	Juve Stabia	Bari	Undisclosed
27 January 2023	Federico Melchiorri	Perugia	Ancona	Undisclosed
27 January 2023	(Paraguay) Federico Santander	Reggina	(Paraguay) Club Guaraní	Loan
28 January 2023	(Croatia) Josip Brekalo	(Germany) VfL Wolfsburg	Fiorentina	Undisclosed
28 January 2023	Simone Lozza	Atalanta	Udinese	Undisclosed
29 January 2023	(Slovakia) Ondrej Duda	(Germany) 1. FC Köln	Verona	Loan
29 January 2023	Luca Zanimacchia	Cremonese	Parma	Loan
29 January 2023	(Poland) Aleksander Buksa	Genoa	(Belgium) Standard Liège	Loan
29 January 2023	(France) Janis Antiste	Sassuolo	(France) Amiens	Loan
30 January 2023	(Denmark) Riza Durmisi	Lazio	(Spain) Tenerife	Undisclosed
30 January 2023	(France) Jean-Victor Makengo	Udinese	(France) Lorient	Undisclosed
30 January 2023	(Belgium) Radja Nainggolan	Unattached	S.P.A.L.	Free
30 January 2023	(Romania) Alin Toșca	(Turkey) Gaziantep	Benevento	Free
30 January 2023	(Denmark) Simon Graves Jensen	(Denmark) Randers	Palermo	Undisclosed
30 January 2023	(Turkey) Kaan Ayhan	Sassuolo	(Turkey) Galatasaray	Loan
30 January 2023	(Uzbekistan) Eldor Shomurodov	Roma	Spezia	Loan
30 January 2023	(France) Michaël Cuisance	Venezia	Sampdoria	Loan
30 January 2023	(Guinea) Moustapha Cissé	Atalanta	Südtirol	Loan
30 January 2023	(Serbia) Ivan Ilić	Verona	Torino	Loan
30 January 2023	Mattia Chiesa	Verona	Mantova	Loan
30 January 2023	Leonardo Capezzi	Salernitana	Perugia	Undisclosed
30 January 2023	Simone Canestrelli	Empoli	Pisa	Undisclosed
30 January 2023	(United States) Weston McKennie	Juventus	(England) Leeds	Loan
30 January 2023	(Uruguay) Matías Viña	Roma	(England) Bournemouth	Loan
31 January 2023	(Argentina) Adolfo Gaich	(Russia) CSKA Moscow	Verona	Loan
31 January 2023	(New Zealand) Matthew Garbett	Torino	(Netherlands) NAC Breda	Loan
31 January 2023	(France) Florian Thauvin	Unattached	Udinese	Free
31 January 2023	(Croatia) Ivan Delić	(Croatia) Šibenik	Cosenza	Loan
31 January 2023	(Sweden) Emmanuel Ekong	Empoli	Perugia	Loan
31 January 2023	Jacopo De Matteis	Salernitana	Fermana	Loan
31 January 2023	Sebastiano Esposito	Inter	Bari	Loan
31 January 2023	Eddie Salcedo	Inter	Genoa	Loan
31 January 2023	Nadir Zortea	Atalanta	Sassuolo	Loan
31 January 2023	Simone Edera	Torino	Pordenone	Undisclosed
31 January 2023	(Germany) Koray Günter	Verona	Sampdoria	Loan
31 January 2023	(Czech Republic) Antonín Barák	Verona	Fiorentina	Undisclosed
31 January 2023	(Cameroon) Martin Hongla	Verona	(Spain) Valladolid	Loan
31 January 2023	(Denmark) Oliver Abildgaard	(Russia) Rubin Kazan	Verona	Loan
31 January 2023	(Paraguay) Diego González	(Mexico) Celaya	Lazio	Loan
31 January 2023	Luca Pellegrini	Juventus	Lazio	Loan
31 January 2023	(Republic of Ireland) Ed McJannet	(England) Luton	Lecce	Undisclosed
31 January 2023	Simone Romagnoli	Parma	Lecce	Undisclosed
31 January 2023	Pietro Ceccaroni	Venezia	Lecce	Loan
31 January 2023	Cristian Macrì	Lecce	Nardò	Loan
31 January 2023	Filippo Alessio	Vicenza	Empoli	Loan
31 January 2023	(Albania) Endri Zenelaj	Fidelis Andria	Empoli	Loan
31 January 2023	Alessio Rosa	Empoli	Juve Stabia	Loan
31 January 2023	Davide Merola	Empoli	Pescara	Loan
31 January 2023	(Albania) Nedim Bajrami	Empoli	Sassuolo	Loan
31 January 2023	Roberto Piccoli	Atalanta	Empoli	18-month loan
31 January 2023	Emanuel Vignato	Bologna	Empoli	Loan
31 January 2023	(Greece) Giorgos Kyriakopoulos	Sassuolo	Bologna	Loan
31 January 2023	(Slovakia) David Strelec	Spezia	Reggina	Loan
31 January 2023	(Serbia) Saša Lukić	Torino	(England) Fulham	Undisclosed
31 January 2023	(Turkey) Emirhan İlkhan	Torino	Sampdoria	Loan
31 January 2023	(England) Ronaldo Vieira	Sampdoria	Torino	Loan
31 January 2023	(Guadeloupe) Andreaw Gravillon	(France) Stade de Reims	Torino	Loan
31 January 2023	(Ivory Coast) Zorom Sirima Aziz	Cosenza	Verona	Undisclosed
31 January 2023	(Ivory Coast) Hamed Traorè	Sassuolo	(England) Bournemouth	Loan
31 January 2023	(Algeria) Massil Adjaoudi	Lazio	(Tunisia) Soliman	Undisclosed
31 January 2023	(Poland) Bartłomiej Maliszewski	Parma	Lazio	Undisclosed
31 January 2023	(Croatia) Bartol Kunert	(Croatia) Rudeš	Lazio	Loan
31 January 2023	Federico Furlan	Ternana	Latina	Loan
31 January 2023	Vincenzo Garofalo	Brescia	Trento	Loan
31 January 2023	Manuel Scavone	Bari	Brescia	Undisclosed
31 January 2023	(Libya) Ahmad Benali	Brescia	Bari	Undisclosed
31 January 2023	Emmanuele Matino	Potenza	Bari	Loan
31 January 2023	Salvatore Molina	Monza	Bari	Undisclosed
31 January 2023	Gregorio Morachioli	Renate	Bari	Undisclosed
31 January 2023	(Brazil) Gabriel Brazão	Inter	S.P.A.L.	Loan
31 January 2023	Tommaso Milanese	Cremonese	Venezia	Loan
31 January 2023	(Chile) Pablo Galdames	Genoa	Cremonese	Loan
31 January 2023	Francesco Gelli	AlbinoLeffe	Frosinone	Undisclosed
31 January 2023	(Morocco) Soufiane Bidaoui	Ascoli	Frosinone	Undisclosed
31 January 2023	Michele Volpe	Frosinone	Juve Stabia	Loan
31 January 2023	Ernesto Torregrossa	Sampdoria	Pisa	Undisclosed
31 January 2023	(Morocco) Abdelhamid Sabiri	Sampdoria	Fiorentina	Undisclosed
31 January 2023	(Morocco) Abdelhamid Sabiri	Fiorentina	Sampdoria	Loan
31 January 2023	Marco Bontempi	Sampdoria	Fiorenzuola	Loan
31 January 2023	(Portugal) Félix Correia	Juventus	(Portugal) Marítimo	Loan
31 January 2023	Emanuele Zuelli	Juventus	Pisa	Undisclosed
31 January 2023	Simone Canestrelli	Pisa	Como	Loan
31 January 2023	(Lithuania) Edgaras Dubickas	Pordenone	Pisa	Undisclosed
31 January 2023	(Lithuania) Edgaras Dubickas	Pisa	Pordenone	Loan
31 January 2023	(Austria) Robert Gucher	Pisa	Pordenone	Undisclosed
31 January 2023	Mario Gargiulo	Modena	Pisa	Loan
31 January 2023	(Moldova) Artur Ioniță	Pisa	Modena	Loan
31 January 2023	(Croatia) Roko Jureškin	Pisa	Benevento	Loan
31 January 2023	(Argentina) Mauro Zárate	Unattached	Cosenza	Free
31 January 2023	Vittorio Agostinelli	Fiorentina	Cosenza	Loan
31 January 2023	(Suriname) Ridgeciano Haps	Venezia	Genoa	Loan
31 January 2023	(Iceland) Óttar Magnús Karlsson	Venezia	Virtus Francavilla	Loan
31 January 2023	Emanuele Terranova	Bari	Reggina	Undisclosed
31 January 2023	(France) Warren Bondo	Monza	Reggina	Loan
31 January 2023	Andrea Carboni	Monza	Venezia	Loan
31 January 2023	(Croatia) Marin Šverko	(Netherlands) Groningen	Venezia	Loan
31 January 2023	(Netherlands) Daishawn Redan	(Germany) Hertha	Venezia	Loan
31 January 2023	Paolo Gozzi	Genoa	Pescara	Loan
31 January 2023	(Slovenia) Nik Prelec	(Austria) WSG Tirol	Cagliari	Undisclosed
31 January 2023	Michele Marconi	Südtirol	Avellino	Undisclosed
31 January 2023	Davide Marsura	Modena	Ascoli	Undisclosed
31 January 2023	Riccardo Spaggiari	Modena	Fiorentina	Undisclosed
31 January 2023	(Argentina) Julian Kadijevic	(Argentina) Club Comunicaciones	Modena	Loan
31 January 2023	Gabriele Ferrarini	Fiorentina	Modena	Loan
31 January 2023	(Bulgaria) Atanas Iliev	Ascoli	(Bulgaria) Cherno More	Free
31 January 2023	Diego Fabbrini	Ascoli	Lucchese	Undisclosed
31 January 2023	(Ivory Coast) Alassane Sidibe	Atalanta	Ascoli	Loan
31 January 2023	Edoardo Masciangelo	Benevento	Palermo	Loan
31 January 2023	Giuseppe Aurelio	Pontedera	Palermo	Undisclosed
31 January 2023	(France) Sanasi Sy	Salernitana	(France) Nîmes	Undisclosed
31 January 2023	(France) Marley Aké	Juventus	(France) Dijon	Loan
1 February 2023	(France) Alexandre Coeff	(France) Auxerre	Brescia	Free
2 February 2023	(Argentina) Joaquín Larrivey	Cosenza	Südtirol	Free
2 February 2023	(Brazil) Adryan	Unattached	Brescia	Free
2 February 2023	(Brazil) Mikael	Salernitana	(Brazil) América Mineiro	Loan
3 February 2023	(Serbia) Marko Lazetić	Milan	(Austria) Rheindorf Altach	Loan
9 February 2023	(Serbia) Ivan Radovanović	Salernitana	Unattached	Released
9 February 2023	Nicolò Zaniolo	Roma	(Turkey) Galatasaray	Undisclosed
9 February 2023	(The Gambia) Omar Colley	Sampdoria	(Turkey) Beşiktaş	Undisclosed
10 February 2023	(Spain) Jesé	Unattached	Sampdoria	Free
17 February 2023	(Greece) Marios Oikonomou	Unattached	Sampdoria	Free
