= 2015–16 SSD Parma Calcio 1913 season =

Parma
2015–16 season
- President: Nevio Scala
- Manager: Luigi Apolloni
- Stadium: Stadio Ennio Tardini
- Serie D: 1st
- Coppa Italia Serie D: First Round
- Highest home attendance: 10,841 vs AltoVicentino (20 September 2015)
- Lowest home attendance: 618 vs Ribelle (30 September 2015)
Home colours	Away colours	Third colours

The 2015–16 season is Parma Calcio 1913's first season in the Serie D since 1969-70. After having been declared bankrupt and relegated from Serie A at the end of the 2014–15 season. The team competed in 2015–16 Serie D and the 2015–16 Coppa Italia Serie D. Parma finished the season in first place, immediately promoted to Lega Pro.

== Players ==
=== Squad information ===
As of 24 February 2016 Note: Flags indicate national team as defined under FIFA eligibility rules; some limited exceptions apply. Players may hold more than one non-FIFA nationality.

No.	Pos.	Nation	Player
1	GK	LVA	Kristaps Zommers
2	DF	ITA	Alessandro Lucarelli (captain)
3	DF	ITA	Luca Cacioli (vice-captain)
4	DF	ITA	Lorenzo Adorni
5	DF	ITA	Giacomo Ricci
6	DF	ITA	Maikol Benassi
7	FW	ITA	Cristian Longobardi
8	FW	ITA	Daniele Melandri
9	FW	ITA	Fabio Lauria
10	FW	ITA	Riccardo Musetti
11	FW	SEN	Yves Baraye
12	DF	ITA	Lorenzo Saporetti
13	GK	SEN	Alioune Fall
14	DF	ITA	Michele Messina (on loan from Atalanta)

No.	Pos.	Nation	Player
15	DF	ITA	Alessio Agrifogli (on loan from Empoli)
16	DF	ITA	Filippo Donati
17	DF	ITA	Giulio Mulas
18	MF	ITA	Francesco Corapi
18	MF	ITA	Crocefisso Miglietta
18	MF	ITA	Davide Giorgino
19	MF	ITA	Lorenzo Simonetti
20	MF	PAR	Walter Rodríguez
21	MF	ITA	Niccolò Molinaro
22	MF	BUL	Dimitar Traykov
23	MF	GAM	Mousa Balla Sowe
24	FW	ITA	Marcello Sereni (on loan from Sassuolo)
25	FW	ITA	Matteo Guazzo
26	FW	ITA	Pasquale Mazzocchi

=== Out on loan ===
Note: Flags indicate national team as defined under FIFA eligibility rules; some limited exceptions apply. Players may hold more than one non-FIFA nationality.

No.	Pos.	Nation	Player
—	GK	ITA	Antonio Cotticelli (at Correggese)

== League table ==
Pos	Team	Pld	W	D	L	GF	GA	GD	Pts	Promotion or relegation
1	Parma (C, P)	38	28	10	0	82	17	+65	94	2016–17 Lega Pro
2	Altovicentino	38	23	8	7	84	43	+41	77	Qualification for Promotion play-off
3	Forlì (P)	38	19	12	7	69	46	+23	69	Qualification for Promotion play-off
4	San Marino	38	17	14	7	55	41	+14	65	Qualification for Promotion play-off
5	Correggese (O)	38	18	10	10	66	49	+17	64	Qualification for Promotion play-off

Source: Soccerway
Rules for classification: 1) points; 2) goal difference; 3) number of goals scored.
(C) Champions; (O) Play-off winners; (P) Promoted

== Coppa Italia Serie D ==
Win Draw Loss

30 September 2015 Qualifying round	Parma	3–2	Ribelle	Parma
15:00 CEST	Lauria 13', 73'; Baraye 79' (pen.)		Lari 23'; Lombardi 59'	Stadium: Stadio Ennio Tardini; Attendance: 618

29 October 2015 First Round	Correggese	0–0 (a.e.t.) (3–2 p)	Parma	Correggio
14:30 CET				Stadium: Stadio Walter Borelli
	Penalties
	Caboni (penalty scored); Bacher (penalty missed); Mantovani (penalty scored); Camara (penalty scored)		Guazzo (penalty scored); Melandri (penalty missed); Vignali (penalty missed); Agrifogli (penalty scored); Benassi (penalty missed)
