= Sowe =

Sowe may refer to:

- Sowe (surname)
- River Sowe in Warwickshire and West Midlands, England
- Walsgrave on Sowe, West Midlands, a village
