= Michael Folorunsho =

Italian footballer (born 1998)

Personal information
- Full name: Michael Ijemuan Folorunsho
- Date of birth: 7 February 1998 (age 28)
- Place of birth: Rome, Italy
- Height: 1.90 m (6 ft 3 in)
- Position: Midfielder

Team information
- Current team: Monza (on loan from Napoli)
- Number: 90

Youth career
- Tor Sapienza
- –2014: Savio
- 2014–2017: Lazio

Senior career*
Years	Team	Apps	(Gls)
2017–2019	Virtus Francavilla	61	(8)
2019–	Napoli	6	(0)
2019–2020	→ Bari (loan)	12	(0)
2020–2021	→ Reggina (loan)	30	(6)
2021–2022	→ Pordenone (loan)	16	(2)
2022	→ Reggina (loan)	15	(2)
2022–2023	→ Bari (loan)	27	(8)
2023–2024	→ Hellas Verona (loan)	34	(5)
2025	→ Fiorentina (loan)	14	(0)
2025–2026	→ Cagliari (loan)	27	(2)
2026–	→ Monza (loan)	0	(0)

International career^{‡}
2024	Italy	2	(0)
- * Club domestic league appearances and goals as of 25 May 2026 ‡ National team caps and goals as of 15 June 2024

Michael Ijemuan Folorunsho (born 7 February 1998) is an Italian professional footballer who plays as a midfielder for Serie A club Monza, on loan from Napoli.

== Club career ==
Folorunsho spent his youth years with Lazio and played for their Under-19 squad. On 18 July 2017, he signed with Serie C club Virtus Francavilla. Folorunsho made his professional Serie C debut for Virtus Francavilla on 26 August 2017, in a game against Lecce. He played 60 Serie C games for Virtus Francavilla in the two seasons.

On 13 July 2019, Folorunsho signed for Serie A club Napoli on a permanent deal. He was sent on loan two days later to Serie C club Bari for two years. Napoli sent Folorunsho on loan to several clubs in the Serie B: Reggina in 2020–21, Pordenone and Reggina in 2021–22, and Bari in 2022–23.

On 16 August 2023, Folorunsho agreed to join Serie A club Hellas Verona on loan for the duration of the 2023–24 season.

On 11 January 2025, Folorunsho signed for Fiorentina on loan with an option to make the deal permanent.

On 24 July 2025, he was loaned out to Cagliari, with an option to buy.

On 28 August 2026, he was loaned out to Monza, with an option to buy.

== International career ==
In March 2024, Folorunsho received his first call-up to play for Italian senior squad from head coach Luciano Spalletti. However, he remained on the bench during friendly games with Venezuela and Ecuador played in the United States. Later that year, on 6 June, Folorunsho was included in the Italian squad for the UEFA Euro 2024. On 9 June, he debuted in a friendly match against Bosnia and Herzegovina at Stadio Carlo Castellani, coming as a substitute to goalscorer Davide Frattesi in the 76th minute as Italy won 1–0.

== Personal life ==
Folorunsho is of Nigerian descent.

== Career statistics ==
=== Club ===
As of match played 27 February 2026

Appearances and goals by club, season and competition
Club	Season	League			Coppa Italia		Other		Total	
Club	Season	Division	Apps	Goals	Apps	Goals	Apps	Goals	Apps	Goals
Lazio	2016–17	Serie A	0	0	0	0	—		0	0
Virtus Francavilla	2017–18	Serie C	28	1	2	0	1 (Note: Appearance in Coppa Italia Serie C)	0	31	1
Virtus Francavilla	2018–19	Serie C	31	7	1	0	3 (Note: One appearance in Coppa Italia Serie C, two appearances in Serie C promotion play-offs)	0	35	7
Virtus Francavilla	Total		59	8	3	0	4	0	66	8
Napoli	2019–20	Serie A	0	0	0	0	—		0	0
Napoli	2024–25	Serie A	6	0	1	0	—		7	0
Napoli	Total		6	0	1	0	0	0	7	0
Bari (loan)	2019–20	Serie C	12	0	0	0	3 (Note: Two appearances in Coppa Italia Serie C, one appearance in Serie C promotion play-offs)	0	15	0
Reggina (loan)	2020–21	Serie B	30	6	2	0	—		32	6
Pordenone (loan)	2021–22	Serie B	16	2	1	1	—		17	3
Reggina (loan)	2021–22	Serie B	15	2	—		—		15	2
Bari (loan)	2022–23	Serie B	27	8	2	1	3 (Note: Appearances in Serie B promotion play-offs)	0	32	9
Hellas Verona (loan)	2023–24	Serie A	34	5	0	0	—		34	5
Fiorentina (loan)	2024–25	Serie A	14	0	—		5 (Note: Appearances in UEFA Conference League)	0	19	0
Cagliari (loan)	2025–26	Serie A	17	2	1	0	—		18	2
Career total			230	33	10	2	15	0	255	35

=== International ===
As of match played 15 June 2024

Appearances and goals by national team and year
National team	Year	Apps	Goals
Italy	2024	2	0
Total		2	0

== Honours ==
Individual

- Serie A Goal of the Month: February 2024
