= Sowe (surname) =

Sowe is a Gambian surname. Notable people with the surname include:

- Ali Sowe (born 1994), Gambian football forward
- Modou Sowe (born 1963), Gambian football referee
- Mousa Balla Sowe (born 1997), Gambian football winger

== See also ==
- Sawe, another surname
