= Emiliano Pattarello =

Italian footballer (born 1999)

Personal information
- Date of birth: 30 July 1999 (age 27)
- Place of birth: Dolo, Italy
- Height: 1.78 m (5 ft 10 in)
- Position: Right winger

Team information
- Current team: Arezzo
- Number: 10

Youth career
- –2016: Cittadella
- 2015–2016: → Bologna (loan)
- 2016–2018: Bologna

Senior career*
| Years | Team | Apps | (Gls) |
| 2018–2020 | Bologna | 0 | (0) |
| 2018–2019 | → Renate (loan) | 16 | (0) |
| 2019–2020 | → Arzignano (loan) | 21 | (0) |
| 2020–2021 | Calvi Noale | | |
| 2021–2022 | Trento | 50 | (6) |
| 2022– | Arezzo | 139 | (41) |
- * Club domestic league appearances and goals as of 30 April 2026

Emiliano Pattarello (born 30 July 1999) is an Italian professional footballer who plays as a right-winger for Serie B club Arezzo.

== Career ==
=== Bologna ===
Born in Dolo, Pattarello was a youth exponent of Bologna.

==== Loan to Renate ====
On 1 July 2018, Pattarello was signed by Serie C club Renate on a season-long loan deal. Four weeks later, on 29 July, he made his debut for Renate as a substitute, replacing Matteo Rossetti in the 46th minute of a 2–0 home defeat against Rezzato in the first round of the Coppa Italia. On 30 September, he made his Serie C debut as a substitute, replacing Guido Gómez in the 84th minute of a 1–0 home defeat against Fermana. On 17 October, Pattarello played his first match as a starter, a 1–0 home defeat against Virtus Verona; he was replaced by Alberto Spagnoli in the 61st minute. Pattarello ended his loan to Renate with 17 appearances, but he never played any entire matches and did not score any goals.

==== Loan to Arzignano ====
On 20 July 2019, Pattarello was loaned to newly promoted Serie C club Arzignano Valchiampo on a season-long loan deal. On 25 August, he made his debut for the club in a 0–0 home draw with Piacenza; he played the entire match. He became Arzignano's first choice early in the season. Pattarello ended his season-long loan to Arzignano with 23 appearances, including 13 as a starter, without scoring any goals and playing only one entire match. Arzignano were relegated to Serie D after losing 2–1 (on aggregate) in the play-out against Imolese. He played both matches.

=== Arezzo ===
On 7 July 2022, Pattarello signed for Arezzo in Serie D.

== Career statistics ==
=== Club ===
As of 22 July 2020

| Club | Season | League | | | Cup | | Europe | | Other | | Total | |
| Club | Season | League | Apps | Goals | Apps | Goals | Apps | Goals | Apps | Goals | Apps | Goals |
|---|---|---|---|---|---|---|---|---|---|---|---|---|
| Renate (loan) | 2018–19 | Serie C | 16 | 0 | 1 | 0 | — | | — | | 17 | 0 |
| Arzignano (loan) | 2019–20 | Serie C | 21 | 0 | 0 | 0 | — | | 2 (Note: All appearance(s) in Serie C play-out.) | 0 | 23 | 0 |
| Career total | | | 37 | 0 | 1 | 0 | — | | 2 | 0 | 40 | 0 |
