= Marco Nasti =

Italian footballer (born 2003)

Personal information
- Date of birth: 17 September 2003 (age 23)
- Place of birth: Pavia, Italy
- Height: 1.79 m (5 ft 10 in)
- Position: Forward

Team information
- Current team: Cremonese
- Number: 19

Youth career
- 2019–2022: AC Milan

Senior career*
Years	Team	Apps	(Gls)
2022–2024	AC Milan	0	(0)
2022–2023	→ Cosenza (loan)	25	(4)
2023–2024	→ Bari (loan)	35	(6)
2024	Milan Futuro (res.)	0	(0)
2024–	Cremonese	35	(4)
2025–2026	→ Empoli (loan)	26	(4)

International career^{‡}
2019	Italy U16	2	(0)
2022	Italy U19	6	(1)
2022–2023	Italy U20	3	(1)
2023–	Italy U21	2	(1)
- * Club domestic league appearances and goals as of 17:23, 31 October 2026 (UTC) ‡ National team caps and goals as of 12 September 2023

Marco Nasti (born 17 September 2003) is an Italian professional footballer who plays as a forward for Serie B club Cremonese.

== Club career ==
=== AC Milan ===
==== Loan to Cosenza ====
In July 2022, after graduating from the AC Milan youth academy, Nasti joined Serie B club Cosenza on a one-year loan.

==== Loan to Bari ====
On 16 July 2023, he joined Serie B club Bari, on a season-long loan.

==== Return to AC Milan and Milan Futuro ====
After the 2023–24 season concluded he returned to AC Milan and joined the club for the 2024–25 pre-season, making headlines at their second friendly match, against English Premier League club Manchester City scoring the third goal of a 3–2 win in New York City, United States on 27 July 2024. Nasti made his debut for the newly created reserve team Milan Futuro on 10 August 2024, coming off the bench at the 78th minute for a 3–0 away win Coppa Italia Serie C first round match against Lecco.

=== Cremonese ===
On 20 August 2024, Nasti joined Serie B club Cremonese, on a permanent transfer for a contract until 2028.

==== Loan to Empoli ====
On 18 August 2025, he joined recently Serie B relegated club Empoli, on a one-year loan with an option to make the move permanent.

== International career ==
He represented Italy at the 2022 UEFA European Under-19 Championship, where Italy reached the semi-final.

Nasti was included in Carmine Nunziata's Italy U21 squad for 2025 Euro U21 Championship qualification, debuting in a scoreless draw against Latvia on 8 September 2023. He scored his first goal in Italy's subsequent qualifier on 12 September 2023, striking a half-volley from near midfield that eluded Turkey's Doğan Alemdar to seal a 2-0 win.

On 13 October 2023, Nasti was involved in a violent row with Atalanta's Matteo Ruggeri that saw the Bari forward punch Ruggeri in the face, breaking his nose. Nasti publicly apologized for his behavior, but was nonetheless cut from the squad.

== Career statistics ==
=== Club ===
As of match played 31 October 2026

Appearances and goals by club, season and competition
Club	Season	League			Cup		Continental		Other		Total	
Club	Season	Division	Apps	Goals	Apps	Goals	Apps	Goals	Apps	Goals	Apps	Goals
Cosenza (loan)	2022–23	Serie B	25	4	0	0	—		2 (Note: Appearances in Serie B play-out)	1	27	5
Bari (loan)	2023–24	Serie B	35	6	1 (Note: Appearance in Coppa Italia)	0	—		1	1	37	7
Milan Futuro	2024–25	Serie C	0	0	1 (Note: Appearance in Coppa Italia Serie C)	0	—		0	0	1	0
Cremonese	2024–25	Serie B	26	2	1	0	—		2	0	29	2
Cremonese	2026–27	Serie B	9	2	2	0	—		0	0	11	2
Cremonese	Total		35	4	3	0	0	0	2	0	40	4
Empoli (loan)	2025–26	Serie B	26	4	0	0	—		0	0	15	3
Career total			121	18	5	0	0	0	5	2	131	20
