= Sawe =

Sawe is a surname. Notable people with the surname include:

- Jonathan Kiplimo Sawe (born 1995), Kenyan middle-distance runner
- Julius Sawe (born 1971), Kenyan racewalker
- Mathew Sawe (born 1988), Kenyan high jumper
- Sabastian Sawe (born 1995), Kenyan long-distance runner
- Tito Sawe (1960–2002), Kenyan sprinter
- William Sawe (born 1955), Kenyan racewalker

== See also ==
- Sowe (surname)
- Blaan people
