= Alessandro Mallamo =

Italian footballer (born 1999)

Personal information
- Date of birth: 22 March 1999 (age 27)
- Place of birth: Vizzolo Predabissi, Italy
- Height: 1.74 m (5 ft 9 in)
- Position: Midfielder

Team information
- Current team: Union Brescia
- Number: 14

Youth career
- –2018: Atalanta

Senior career*
Years	Team	Apps	(Gls)
2018–2024	Atalanta	0	(0)
2018–2019	→ Novara (loan)	20	(1)
2019–2020	→ Juve Stabia (loan)	28	(2)
2020–2021	→ Pordenone (loan)	23	(0)
2021–2023	→ Bari (loan)	63	(3)
2023–2024	→ Atalanta Under-23 (res.)	19	(1)
2024	→ Südtirol (loan)	10	(0)
2024–2026	Südtirol	31	(2)
2026	→ Union Brescia (loan)	10	(0)
2026–	Union Brescia	1	(0)

International career^{‡}
2014–2015	Italy U16	10	(0)
2015–2016	Italy U17	9	(1)
2016–2017	Italy U18	8	(0)
2017–2018	Italy U19	12	(0)
2018–2019	Italy U20	6	(0)
- * Club domestic league appearances and goals as of 21 August 2026 ‡ National team caps and goals as of 27 March 2019

Alessandro Mallamo (born 22 March 1999) is an Italian footballer who plays as a midfielder for Serie C Group A club Union Brescia.

== Club career ==
=== Atalanta ===
Born in Vizzolo Predabissi, Mallamo was a youth product of Atalanta.

==== Loan to Novara ====
On 24 August 2018, Mallamo joined to Serie C club Novara on a season-long loan. On 21 October he made his professional debut in Serie C for Novara as a 60th-minute substitute for Matteo Stoppa in a 2–0 away win over Pistoiese. On 3 November he played his first entire match for the team, a 1–1 away draw against Pro Vercelli. On 12 January 2019, Mallamo played as a substitute in the round of 16 of Coppa Italia, a 4–1 away defeat against Lazio. On 1 April he scored his first professional goal in the 47th minute of a 2–1 home defeat against Virtus Entella. Mallamo ended his season-long loan to Novara with 21 appearances, including 12 as a starter, and 1 goal.

==== Loan to Juve Stabia ====
On 11 July 2019, Mallamo was signed by newly promoted Serie B side Juve Stabia on a season-long loan deal. On 1 September he made his Serie B debut for the club in a 2–0 home defeat against Pisa, he played the entire match. Two weeks later. on 14 September, he was sent-off with a double yellow card in the 87th minute of a 0–0 away draw against Perugia. On 13 June 2020, Mallamo scored his first goal for the club in the 3rd minute of a 2–2 away draw against Frosinone and 4 days later, on 17 June, he scored his second goal in the 85th minute of a 3–2 win over Chievo. Mallamo ended his season-long loan to Juve Stabia with 28 appearances and 2 goals, however Juve Stabia was relegated in Serie C.

==== Loan to Pordenone ====
On 4 September 2020, Mallamo was loaned to Serie B club Pordenone on a season-long loan deal. Three weeks later, on 26 September, he made his debut for the club as a starter in a 0–0 away draw against Lecce, he was replaced by Davide Gavazzi in the 76h minute.

==== Loan to Bari ====
On 31 August 2021, he joined Serie C club Bari on loan. On 16 July 2022, the loan was renewed for the 2022–23 season, with Bari now in Serie B.

=== Südtirol ===
On 1 February 2024, Mallamo joined Südtirol in Serie B on loan with a conditional obligation to buy. The conditions were triggered and Mallamo remained at Südtirol on a permanent basis.

== International career ==
He was first called up to represent his country in September 2014 for Italy national under-16 football team friendlies.

He participated in the 2016 UEFA European Under-17 Championship, where Under-17 squad did not advance out of group stage.

He made one substitute appearance at the 2018 UEFA European Under-19 Championship, where Under-19 squad finished as runners-up.

== Career statistics ==
=== Club ===
As of match played 24 April 2022

Club	Season	League			Cup		Europe		Other		Total	
Club	Season	League	Apps	Goals	Apps	Goals	Apps	Goals	Apps	Goals	Apps	Goals
Novara (loan)	2018–19	Serie C	20	1	1	0	—		—		21	1
Juve Stabia (loan)	2019–20	Serie B	28	2	0	0	—		—		28	2
Pordenone (loan)	2020–21	Serie B	23	0	2	0	—		—		25	0
Bari (loan)	2021–22	Serie C	32	2	—		—		—		32	2
Career total			103	5	3	0	—		—		106	5

== Honours ==
=== Club ===
Bari

- Serie C: 2021–22 (Group C)

=== International ===
Italy U-19

- UEFA European Under-19 Championship runner-up: 2018
