= Walid Cheddira =

Moroccan footballer (born 1998)

Walid Cheddira وليد شديرة
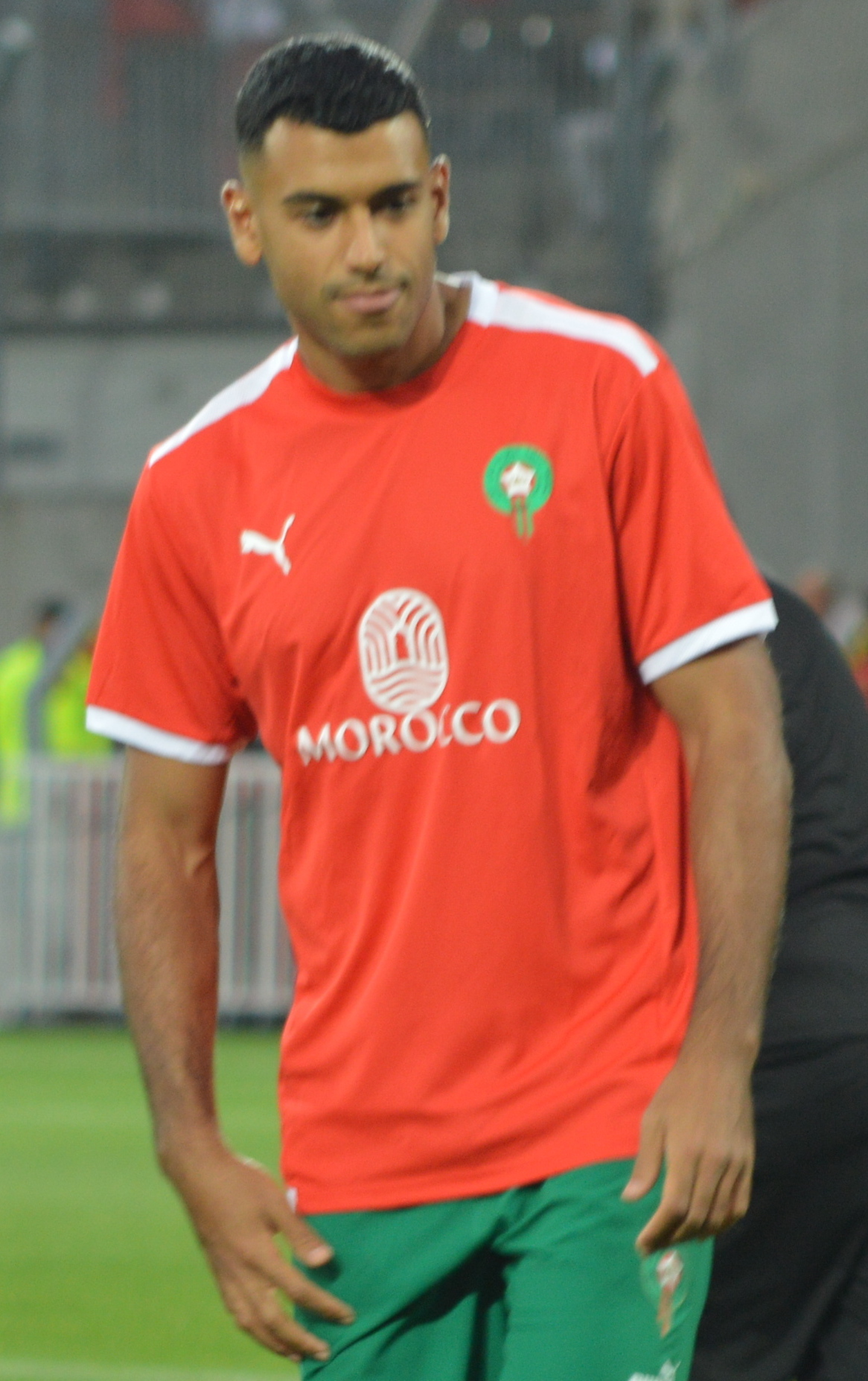
- Cheddira with Morocco in 2023

Personal information
- Full name: Walid Cheddira
- Date of birth: 22 January 1998 (age 28)
- Place of birth: Loreto, Italy
- Height: 1.87 m (6 ft 2 in)
- Position: Forward

Team information
- Current team: Avellino
- Number: 9

Senior career*
Years	Team	Apps	(Gls)
2015–2017	Loreto	49	(9)
2017–2019	Sangiustese	72	(20)
2019–2021	Parma	0	(0)
2019–2020	→ Arezzo (loan)	13	(0)
2020	→ Lecco (loan)	2	(0)
2020–2021	→ Mantova (loan)	38	(9)
2021–2023	Bari	65	(23)
2023–2026	Napoli	1	(0)
2023–2024	→ Frosinone (loan)	36	(7)
2024–2025	→ Espanyol (loan)	22	(1)
2025–2026	→ Sassuolo (loan)	16	(1)
2026	→ Lecce (loan)	17	(3)
2026–	Avellino	0	(0)

International career
2022–2023	Morocco	6	(0)
- * Club domestic league appearances and goals as of 25 May 2026

Walid Cheddira (Arabic: وليد شديرة; born 22 January 1998) is a professional footballer who plays as a forward for Serie B club Avellino. Born in Italy, he played for the Morocco national team.

== Early life ==
Cheddira was born in Loreto, Marche, Italy to parents originally from Béni Mellal, Morocco. His father, Aziz, was also a footballer, having played for some time in the Moroccan minor leagues.

== Club career ==
=== Early career ===
Cheddira began playing football in his hometown team, Loreto, playing in the amateur Eccellenza league. On 15 July 2017, he was purchased by Sangiustese, making his debut with the club in the Coppa Italia Serie D match won 3–0 against Castelfidardo, in which he scored his first goal for Sangiustese.

=== Parma ===
On 10 July 2019, Cheddira signed a three-year contract with Serie A club Parma, who loaned him to Arezzo in Serie C on 22 July. He made his professional Serie C debut on 25 August, as a starter in a game against Lecco. After half a season, Parma sent Cheddira on loan to Lecco on 31 January 2020, and to Mantova on 4 September.

=== Bari ===
On 18 July 2021, Cheddira joined Bari on loan, who made the deal permanent on 30 June 2022, signing a contract until June 2025.

=== Napoli ===
On 20 August 2023, Cheddira was signed by Napoli and loaned to Frosinone for the 2023–24 season. On 27 August 2024, Cheddira moved on a new loan to Espanyol in Spain. On 1 September 2025, he was loaned to Sassuolo with an option to buy. On 22 January 2026, Cheddira moved on a new loan to Lecce, also with an option to buy.

== International career ==
Cheddira was born in Italy and is Moroccan by descent. He was called up to play for the Morocco national team for two friendlies against Chile and Paraguay on 23 and 27 September 2022, respectively; he made his debut against Chile as a second-half substitute in a 2–0 win.

On 10 November 2022, Cheddira was named in Morocco's 26-man squad for the 2022 FIFA World Cup in Qatar. He made his World Cup debut as an 82nd-minute substitute in the round of 16 against Spain, a penalty shoot-out victory for Morocco following a 0–0 draw after extra time. In the quarter-finals against Portugal, Cheddira came on in the 65th minute, and was sent off after two yellow cards in stoppage time; Morocco won 1–0.

== Style of play ==
Cheddira is a varied forward, capable of playing both as a central striker and as a winger on either flank. Physically strong, he has also shown that he has notable athletic skills, especially useful in pressing and making runs. He also complements his team's offensive actions, also as an assist-man, and is quite incisive in front of goal, being able to finish with either direct shots or headers.

== Personal life ==
During his time at Bari, Cheddira was nicknamed "Ualino" or "Walino", a diminutive of the name Pasquale in the Barese dialect.

== Career statistics ==
As of match played 17 May 2026

Appearances and goals by club, season and competition
Club	Season	League			National cup (Note: Includes Coppa Italia, Copa del Rey)		Other		Total	
Club	Season	Division	Apps	Goals	Apps	Goals	Apps	Goals	Apps	Goals
Sangiustese	2017–18	Serie D	34	10	0	0	2 (Note: Appearances in Coppa Italia Serie D)	1	36	11
Sangiustese	2018–19	Serie D	38	10	0	0	2 (Note: One appearance in Coppa Italia Serie D, one appearance in Serie D promotion play-offs)	0	40	10
Sangiustese	Total		72	20	0	0	4	1	76	21
Arezzo (loan)	2019–20	Serie C	13	0	2	0	1 (Note: Appearance in Coppa Italia Serie C)	0	16	0
Lecco (loan)	2019–20	Serie C	2	0	0	0	0	0	2	0
Mantova (loan)	2020–21	Serie C	38	9	0	0	1 (Note: Appearance in Serie C promotion play-offs)	0	39	9
Bari	2021–22	Serie C	34	6	0	0	3 (Note: One appearance in Coppa Italia Serie C, two appearances in Supercoppa di Serie C)	0	37	6
Bari	2022–23	Serie B	31	17	3	5	4 (Note: Appearances in Serie B promotion play-offs)	0	38	22
Bari	Total		65	23	3	5	7	0	75	28
Napoli	2023–24	Serie A	0	0	0	0	0	0	0	0
Napoli	2024–25	Serie A	1	0	1	0	0	0	2	0
Napoli	Total		1	0	1	0	0	0	2	0
Frosinone (loan)	2023–24	Serie A	36	7	3	1	0	0	39	8
Espanyol (loan)	2024–25	La Liga	22	1	1	0	0	0	23	1
Sassuolo (loan)	2025–26	Serie A	16	1	1	0	0	0	17	1
Lecce (loan)	2025–26	Serie A	16	3	0	0	0	0	16	3
Career total			280	65	11	6	13	1	305	71

== Honours ==
Bari

- Serie C: 2021–22

Individual

- Serie B Player of the Month: September 2022
- Coppa Italia Top scorer: 2022–23

Orders

- Order of the Throne: 2022
