= Luca Cacioli =

Italian footballer (born 1982)

Personal information
- Date of birth: 27 March 1982 (age 44)
- Place of birth: Arezzo, Italy
- Height: 1.85 m (6 ft 1 in)
- Position: Defender

Senior career*
Years	Team	Apps	(Gls)
2000–2004	Montevarchi Aquila	33	(0)
2005–2006	Sansepolcro	31	(0)
2006–2007	Fano	26	(0)
2007–2009	Bellaria Igea	27	(0)
2009–2010	Fano	24	(2)
2010–2013	Perugia	64	(4)
2013–2014	Ancona	29	(1)
2014–2015	Rimini	26	(0)
2015–2016	Parma	35	(1)
2016	Matelica	15	(0)
2017	Ancona	12	(0)
2017–2018	Vis Pesaro	31	(1)
2018–2019	Bari	27	(1)
- * Club domestic league appearances and goals

Luca Cacioli (born 27 March 1982) is a former Italian footballer.
