= Elia Caprile =

Italian footballer (born 2001)

Personal information
- Date of birth: 25 August 2001 (age 25)
- Place of birth: Verona, Italy
- Height: 1.91 m (6 ft 3 in)
- Position: Goalkeeper

Team information
- Current team: Cagliari
- Number: 1

Youth career
- 2009–2020: Chievo
- 2020–2022: Leeds United

Senior career*
Years	Team	Apps	(Gls)
2018–2020	Chievo	0	(0)
2020–2022	Leeds United	0	(0)
2021–2022	→ Pro Patria (loan)	38	(0)
2022–2023	Bari	41	(0)
2023–2025	Napoli	4	(0)
2023–2024	→ Empoli (loan)	23	(0)
2025	→ Cagliari (loan)	18	(0)
2025–	Cagliari	49	(0)

International career
2022–2023	Italy U21	2	(0)
- * Club domestic league appearances and goals as of 19:53, 11 November 2026 (UTC)

Elia Caprile (born 25 August 2001) is an Italian and Albanian professional footballer who plays as a goalkeeper for Serie A club Cagliari.

== Club career ==
Born in Verona, of Neapolitan origins on his father's side and raised in the near comune of San Zeno di Montagna, Caprile started playing football at the local grassroots club Cadore before joining Chievo’s youth system. After coming through the various ranks, he was promoted to the first team in 2018, although he never made any senior appearances for the club.

After rejecting an official contract offer from Chievo, on 21 January 2020, Caprile joined English club Leeds United, signing a deal until June 2023. During his stint in Yorkshire, the goalkeeper mainly featured for the club's under-23 side and received several call-ups to the first team under manager Marcelo Bielsa, despite not having collected any official appearances.

On 7 August 2021, Caprile joined Serie C club Pro Patria on a season-long loan. He subsequently made his professional debut on 29 August 2021, starting the league match against AlbinoLeffe. During the season, he established himself as the team's first-choice goalkeeper, keeping a total amount of 12 clean sheets in 39 appearances, as Pro Patria reached the second round of the play-offs before losing to Triestina.

On 13 July 2022, it was announced that Caprile had completed a transfer to Serie B club Bari, signing a three-year deal with the club in the process. He finished the season as one of the best goalkeeper of the league, with 14 clean sheets and losing the promotion at the minute 95 in the playoff final against Cagliari.

On 24 July 2023, Caprile officially joined Serie A club Napoli on a permanent deal, and was immediately loaned for one season to fellow top-flight side Empoli. He made his debut for the club on 12 August 2023, starting in a 2–1 Coppa Italia loss to Cittadella. He then made his league debut one week later, starting in a 0–1 defeat to Hellas Verona.

On 7 January 2025, Caprile was loaned to Cagliari for the remainder of the season. On 24 June 2025, the move to Cagliari was made permanent.

== International career ==
Caprile has represented Italy at youth international level, having featured for the under-18 national team in 2019. In 2026, he was called up to the Italy national team.

== Personal life ==
On 19 October 2026, Caprile obtained Albanian passport, through his marriage to an Albanian citizen.

== Career statistics ==
As of match played 7 November 2026

Appearances and goals by club, season and competition
Club	Season	League			National cup (Note: Includes Coppa Italia)		League cup		Other		Total	
Club	Season	Division	Apps	Goals	Apps	Goals	Apps	Goals	Apps	Goals	Apps	Goals
Chievo	2018–19	Serie B	0	0	0	0	—		—		0	0
Chievo	2019–20	Serie B	0	0	0	0	—		—		0	0
Chievo	Total		0	0	0	0	—		—		0	0
Leeds United	2019–20	Championship	0	0	0	0	0	0	—		0	0
Leeds United	2020–21	Premier League	0	0	0	0	0	0	—		0	0
Leeds United	Total		0	0	0	0	0	0	—		0	0
Pro Patria (loan)	2021–22	Serie C	36	0	1	0	—		2 (Note: Appearances in Serie C promotion play-offs)	0	39	0
Bari	2022–23	Serie B	37	0	2	0	—		4 (Note: Appearances in Serie B promotion play-offs)	0	43	0
Napoli	2024–25	Serie A	4	0	2	0	—		—		6	0
Empoli (loan)	2023–24	Serie A	23	0	1	0	—		—		24	0
Cagliari (loan)	2024–25	Serie A	18	0	—		—		—		18	0
Cagliari	2025–26	Serie A	38	0	2	0	—		—		40	0
Cagliari	2026–27	Serie A	11	0	1	0	—		—		12	0
Cagliari	Cagliari total		67	0	3	0	—		—		70	0
Career total			171	0	9	0	0	0	6	0	186	0
