= Giacomo Ricci (footballer) =

Italian footballer

Personal information
- Date of birth: 2 September 1996 (age 30)
- Place of birth: Livorno, Italy
- Height: 1.80 m (5 ft 11 in)
- Position: Full-back

Team information
- Current team: Benevento
- Number: 31

Youth career
- –2015: Livorno

Senior career*
Years	Team	Apps	(Gls)
2015	Livorno	0	(0)
2015	→ Altovincentino (loan)	12	(0)
2015–2021	Parma	40	(1)
2017–2018	→ Pro Piacenza (loan)	27	(2)
2018–2019	→ Carrarese (loan)	33	(0)
2019–2020	→ Juve Stabia (loan)	22	(0)
2021	→ Venezia (loan)	11	(0)
2021–2024	Bari	77	(3)
2024–2025	Cosenza	22	(0)
2025–	Benevento	14	(1)
- * Club domestic league appearances and goals as of 1 May 2026

Giacomo Ricci (born 2 September 1996) is an Italian professional footballer who plays as a full-back for Serie B club Benevento.

== Career ==
He made his Serie C debut for Parma on 17 September 2016 in a game against Pordenone. He remained with the club as it was promoted three times from Serie D up to Serie A.

On 28 August 2019, he joined Juve Stabia on loan with an option to buy.

On 10 January 2021, he made his debut for Parma in Serie A in a 2–0 home loss against Lazio.

On 30 January 2021, Ricci joined Venezia on loan.

On 31 August 2021, he signed a two-year contract with Bari.

On 30 August 2024, Ricci moved to Cosenza on a two-year deal.

== Career statistics ==
As of March 2023

Club statistics
Club	Season	League			Cup		League Cup		Other		Total	
Club	Season	Division	Apps	Goals	Apps	Goals	Apps	Goals	Apps	Goals	Apps	Goals
Livorno	2014–15	Serie B	0	0	0	0	0	0	0	0	0	0
Altovicentino (loan)	2014–15	Serie D	12	0	0	0	0	0	1 (Note: Appearance in the 2014–15 Promotion play-offs)	0	13	0
Parma	2015–16	Serie D	30	1	0	0	0	0	2 (Note: Appearances in the 2015–16 Scudetto Dilettanti)	0	32	1
Parma	2016–17	Lega Pro	7	0	0	0	0	0	0	0	7	0
Parma	2017–18	Serie B	0	0	0	0	0	0	0	0	0	0
Parma	2018–19	Serie A	0	0	0	0	0	0	0	0	0	0
Parma	2019–20	Serie A	0	0	0	0	0	0	0	0	0	0
Parma	2020–21	Serie A	3	0	3	0	0	0	0	0	6	0
Parma	Total		40	1	3	0	0	0	2	0	45	1
Pro Piacenza (loan)	2017–18	Serie C	27	2	1	0	0	0	1 (Note: Appearance in the Coppa Italia Serie C)	0	29	2
Carrarese (loan)	2018–19	Serie C	33	0	1	0	0	0	4 (Note: Three Appearances in the 2018–19 Promotion play-offs and One Appearance in the Coppa Italia Serie C)	0	38	0
Juve Stabia (loan)	2019–20	Serie B	22	0	0	0	0	0	0	0	22	0
Venezia (loan)	2020–21	Serie B	11	0	0	0	0	0	1 (Note: Appearance in the 2020–21 Promotion play-offs)	0	12	0
Bari	2021–22	Serie C	23	0	0	0	0	0	0	0	23	0
Bari	2022–23	Serie B	13	0	3	0	0	0	0	0	16	0
Bari	Total		36	0	3	0	0	0	0	0	39	0
Career totals			181	3	8	0	0	0	9	0	198	3

== Honours ==
Bari

- Serie C: 2021–22 (Group C)
