= Davide Giorgino =

Italian footballer (born 1985)

Personal information
- Date of birth: 4 May 1985 (age 41)
- Place of birth: Brindisi, Italy
- Height: 1.75 m (5 ft 9 in)
- Position: Midfielder

Team information
- Current team: Franciacorta FC

Senior career*
Years	Team	Apps	(Gls)
2004–2008	Lecce	10	(0)
2006–2008	→ Sambenedettese (loan)	58	(2)
2008–2012	Taranto	106	(2)
2012–2013	Andria BAT	27	(1)
2013–2014	Matera	8	(0)
2014	Chieti	15	(0)
2014–2015	Triestina	7	(0)
2015	Delta Rovigo	17	(1)
2015–2017	Parma	52	(3)
2017–2019	AC Rezzato	41	(3)
2019–	Franciacorta FC	22	(0)
- * Club domestic league appearances and goals as of 18:49, 19 April 2020 (UTC)

Davide Giorgino (born 4 May 1985) is an Italian professional football player who plays for Franciacorta FC, mostly as a defensive midfielder.

== Club career ==
He played 2 seasons (10 games, no goals) in the Serie A for U.S. Lecce.
