= Alessandro Farroni =

Italian footballer (born 1997)

Personal information
- Date of birth: 20 September 1997 (age 29)
- Place of birth: Spoleto, Italy
- Height: 1.86 m (6 ft 1 in)
- Position: Goalkeeper

Team information
- Current team: Casarano
- Number: 97

Youth career
- –2016: Perugia

Senior career*
Years	Team	Apps	(Gls)
2015–2016	Perugia	0	(0)
2015–2016	→ Foligno (loan)	22	(0)
2016–2018	L'Aquila	57	(0)
2018–2019	Matera	17	(0)
2019–2022	Reggina	2	(0)
2021	→ Juve Stabia (loan)	6	(0)
2021–2022	→ Vis Pesaro (loan)	36	(0)
2022–2024	Vis Pesaro	34	(0)
2023–2024	→ Bari (loan)	0	(0)
2024	→ Alessandria (loan)	5	(0)
2024–2025	Catania	3	(0)
2025–2026	Siracusa	34	(0)
2026–	Casarano	2	(0)
- * Club domestic league appearances and goals as of 28 August 2026

Alessandro Farroni (born 20 September 1997) is an Italian professional footballer who plays as a goalkeeper for Serie C Group C club Casarano.

== Career ==
Born in Spoleto, Farroni started his career in Perugia youth sector. As a senior, he player for Serie D clubs Foligno and L'Aquila.

In August 2018, he left L'Aquila and signed with Serie C club Matera. Farroni made his professional debut on 18 September 2018 against Rieti.

After one season in Matera, on 31 January 2019 he moved to Reggina. The club won the promotion to Serie B this season.

With Reggina on Serie B, Farroni was loaned to Serie C club Juve Stabia.

On 8 July 2022, he extended his contract with the club, and was loaned to Vis Pesaro on Serie C. On 13 January 2022 he signed with Vis Pesaro.

On 1 September 2023, he joined Bari on season-long loan. On 26 January 2024, Farroni moved on a new loan to Alessandria. On 29 August 2024, Farroni and Vis Pesaro dissolved their contract by mutual consent.

On 17 December 2024, Farroni signed a contract with Catania until the end of the season, with an option to extend.
