= Marco Bosisio =

Italian footballer (born 2002)

Personal information
- Date of birth: 18 April 2002 (age 24)
- Place of birth: Vimercate, Italy
- Height: 1.84 m (6 ft 0 in)
- Position: Centre-back

Team information
- Current team: Ischia
- Number: 13

Youth career
- –2022: AC Milan

Senior career*
Years	Team	Apps	(Gls)
2022–2023	Bari	1	(0)
2023–2026	Renate	27	(0)
2024–2025	→ Campobasso (loan)	10	(0)
2026–	Ischia	4	(1)
- * Club domestic league appearances and goals as of 4 March 2026

Marco Bosisio (born 18 April 2002) is an Italian professional footballer who plays as a centre-back for Serie D club Ischia.

== Club career ==
Bosisio was raised in the youth teams of AC Milan and represented the club in the 2021–22 UEFA Youth League.

On 2 July 2022, Bosisio signed a three-year contract with Bari in Serie B. He made his Serie B debut for Bari on 12 August 2022 in a game against Parma.

On 14 July 2024, Bosisio joined Campobasso on loan.

== Career statistics ==
As of match played 29 September 2024

Appearances and goals by club, season and competition
Club	Season	League			Coppa Italia		Other		Total	
Club	Season	Division	Apps	Goals	Apps	Goals	Apps	Goals	Apps	Goals
Bari	2022-23	Serie B	1	0	1	0	0	0	2	0
Renate	2023-24	Serie C	27	0	0	0	—		27	0
Campobasso (loan)	2024-25	Serie C	6	0	0	0	—		6	0
Career total			34	0	1	0	0	0	35	0
