= Mattia Maita =

Italian footballer (born 1994)

Personal information
- Date of birth: 29 July 1994 (age 32)
- Place of birth: Messina, Italy
- Height: 1.82 m (6 ft 0 in)
- Position: Midfielder

Team information
- Current team: Benevento
- Number: 8

Youth career
- –2011: Reggina

Senior career*
Years	Team	Apps	(Gls)
2011–2015	Reggina	9	(0)
2011	→ Catanzaro (loan)	8	(0)
2012–2013	→ Rimini (loan)	30	(0)
2013–2014	→ Lumezzane (loan)	25	(0)
2015–2020	Catanzaro	137	(6)
2020–2025	Bari	170	(6)
2025–	Benevento	35	(1)
- * Club domestic league appearances and goals as of 1 May 2026

Mattia Maita (born 29 July 1994) is an Italian footballer who plays as a midfielder for Serie B club Benevento.

== Career ==
He made his Serie B debut for Reggina on 29 May 2011 in a game against Sassuolo.

On 18 January 2020, he signed with Bari and scored goal in his debut against Rieti on 19 January 2020.

== Honours ==
Bari

- Serie C: 2021–22 (Group C)
