= Daniele Celiento =

Italian footballer (born 1994)

Personal information
- Date of birth: 6 August 1994 (age 32)
- Place of birth: Naples, Italy
- Height: 1.82 m (5 ft 11 1/2 in)
- Position: Defender

Team information
- Current team: Salernitana

Youth career
- 2000–2008: Satellite Caivano

Senior career*
Years	Team	Apps	(Gls)
2008–2017	Napoli	0	(0)
2013–2014	→ Viareggio	22	(0)
2014–2015	→ Pistoiese (loan)	16	(0)
2015–2016	→ Robur Siena (loan)	28	(2)
2016–2017	→ Viterbese (loan)	34	(3)
2017–2018	Viterbese	38	(5)
2018	Pescara	0	(0)
2018–2020	Catanzaro	55	(6)
2020–2024	Bari	39	(4)
2022–2023	→ Cesena (loan)	16	(1)
2023–2024	→ Casertana (loan)	28	(0)
2024–2025	Trapani	28	(2)
2025–2026	Casarano	27	(1)
2026–	Salernitana	4	(3)

International career
2015	Italy U-19	5	(0)
- * Club domestic league appearances and goals as of 28 August 2026

Daniele Celiento (born 6 August 1994) is an Italian professional footballer who plays as a defender for Serie C Group C club Salernitana.

== Club career ==
He joined the ranks of Napoli. On 1 August 2013, he was loaned to Viareggio of the Lega Pro Prima Divisione (third level of football in Italy), where he totaled 22 appearances. On 25 July 2014, Napoli loaned him to Pistoiese. On 1 August 2015, he was loaned to Robur Siena.

On 7 July 2018, Serie B club Pescara announced the acquisition of Celiento.

However, just 3 weeks later, before he appeared in any official games for Pescara, he was transferred again, this time to Catanzaro in Serie C, signing a two-year contract on 26 July 2018.

On 15 September 2020 he moved to Bari. On 1 September 2022, Celiento was loaned to Cesena.

On 7 September 2023, Celiento extended his contract with Bari to 2026 and was sent on a season-long loan to Casertana, with Casertana holding an obligation to sign him permanently in case of their promotion to Serie B.

On 15 July 2024, Celiento moved to Trapani.

== International career ==
In June 2015, Celiento played five friendly matches for Italy U-19.

== Honours ==
Bari

- Serie C: 2021–22 (Group C)
