= Matteo Rossetti =

Italian footballer (born 1998)

Personal information
- Date of birth: 23 July 1998 (age 28)
- Place of birth: Saluzzo, Italy
- Height: 1.91 m (6 ft 3 in)
- Position: Midfielder

Team information
- Current team: Ravenna
- Number: 8

Youth career
- –2017: Torino

Senior career*
Years	Team	Apps	(Gls)
2017–2020	Torino	0	(0)
2017–2018	→ Alessandria (loan)	2	(0)
2018	→ Fermana (loan)	4	(0)
2018–2019	→ Renate (loan)	24	(0)
2019–2020	→ Avellino (loan)	24	(1)
2020–2021	Pordenone	22	(0)
2021–2023	Bari	0	(0)
2021–2022	→ Teramo (loan)	22	(0)
2022–2023	→ Rimini (loan)	32	(0)
2023–2024	Vis Pesaro	30	(0)
2024–	Ravenna	56	(0)
- * Club domestic league appearances and goals as of 30 April 2026

Matteo Rossetti (born 23 July 1998) is an Italian footballer who plays as a midfielder for Serie C Group B club Ravenna.

== Club career ==
=== Torino ===
Born in Saluzzo, Rossetti was a youth product of Torino.

==== Loan to Alessandria and Fermana ====
On 4 August 2017, Rossetti was signed by Serie C side Alessandria on a season-long loan deal. On 9 November he made his Serie C debut for Alessandria as a substitute replacing Riccardo Cazzola in the 85th minute of a 4–0 home win over Olbia. On 23 December he made his second appearances, again as a substitute replacing Simone Branca in the 55th minute of a 5–1 home win over Pontedera. His loan was terminated during the 2018–19 season winter break and Rossetti returned to Torino leaving Alessandria with only 2 appearances, both as a substitute, but he remained an unused substitute 16 other times.

On 31 January 2018, Rossetti was loaned to another Serie C club, Fermana, on a 6-month loan deal. Eleven days later, on 10 February, he made his championship debut for Fermana as a substitute replacing Victor Da Silva in the 83rd minute of a 4–2 home win over Teramo. He made 3 other appearances for the club, all as a substitute, against Triestina, Pordenone and AlbinoLeffe. Rossetti ended his second part of the season with this 6-month loan to Fermana with only 4 appearances, all as a substitute, however he remained an unused substitute for 7 other matches.

==== Loan to Renate ====
On 19 July 2018, Rossetti was signed by Serie C club Renate on a season-long loan deal. On 29 July he made his debut for Renate in a 2–0 home defeat against Rezzato in the first round of Coppa Italia, he was replaced by Emiliano Pattarello in the 46th minute. On 23 September he made his Serie C debut for Renate as a substitute replacing Reno Piscopo in the 65th minute of a 1–1 home draw against Vicenza Virtus. One week later, on 30 September, Rossetti played his first match as a starter for Renate, a 1–0 home defeat against Fermana, he was replaced by Francesco Finocchio in the 46th minute. On 21 October he played his first entire match for Renate, a 2–1 away defeat against Pordenone. Rossetti ended his loan to Renate with 25 appearances, 16 of them as a starter.

==== Loan to Avellino ====
On 12 August 2019, Rossetti was loaned to newly promoted Serie C club Avellino on a season-long loan deal. Two weeks later, on 25 August he made his debut for the club in a 6–3 home defeat against Catania, he was replaced by Marco Silvestri in the 62nd minute. One more week later, on 1 September, Rossetti scored his first professional goal and the decisive goal in a 1–0 away win over Vibonese, he also played his first entire match for the club. Rossetti ended his season-long to Avellino with 25 appearances, including 12 of them as a starter, 1 goal and 2 assist, however he played only 2 entire matches during the loan. He also helped the club to reach the play-off, however the club was eliminated by Ternana in the first round, he played the second half as a substitute.

=== Pordenone ===
On 1 September 2020, Rossetti joined to Serie B club Pordenone for an undisclosed fee and he signed a 3-year contract. On 26 September he made his Serie B debut for the club in a 0–0 away draw against Lecce, he played the entire match. Four days later, on 30 September, he scored his first goal for the club in the 20th minute of a 3–0 home win over Casarano in the second round of Coppa Italia.

=== Bari ===
On 31 August 2021, he signed a three-year contract with Bari and was loaned to Teramo. On 15 July 2022, Rossetti was loaned to Rimini.

=== Vis Pesaro ===
On 1 September 2023, Rossetti moved to Vis Pesaro.

== Career statistics ==
=== Club ===
As of match played 3 April 2022

Club	Season	League			Cup		Europe		Other		Total	
Club	Season	League	Apps	Goals	Apps	Goals	Apps	Goals	Apps	Goals	Apps	Goals
Alessandria (loan)	2017–18	Serie C	2	0	0	0	—		—		2	0
Fermana (loan)	2017–18	Serie C	4	0	—		—		—		4	0
Renate (loan)	2018–19	Serie C	24	0	1	0	—		—		25	0
Avellino (loan)	2019–20	Serie C	24	1	0	0	—		1 (Note: All appearance(s) in Serie C play-off.)	0	25	1
Pordenone	2020–21	Serie B	22	0	2	1	—		—		24	1
Teramo (loan)	2021–22	Serie C	21	0	2	1	—		—		21	0
Career total			97	1	2	1	—		1	0	101	2

== Honours ==
=== Club ===
Alessandria

- Coppa Italia Serie C: 2017–18
