= Stadio San Nicola =

Football stadium in Bari, Italy

Coordinates: 41°5′5″N 16°50′24″E

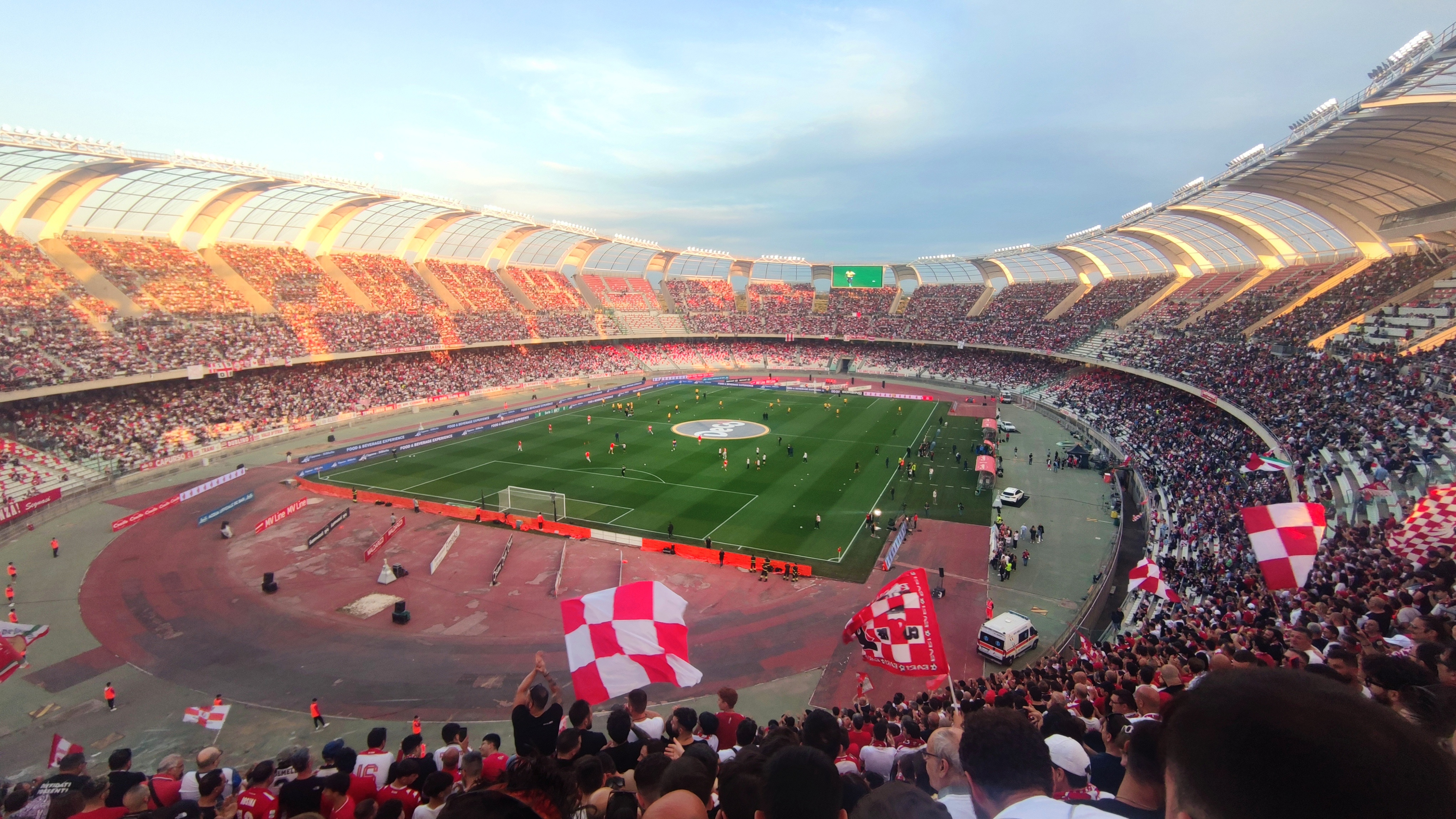
- UEFA
- Interactive map of Stadio San Nicola
- Location: Bari, Italy
- Owner: Municipality of Bari
- Capacity: 58,270
- Surface: Grass
- Scoreboard: Tecnovision
- Field size: 105 by 68 m (344 by 223 ft)

Construction
- Opened: 1990
- Renovated: 2020–2023

Tenants
- SSC Bari (1990–present); Italy national football team (selected matches)

Stadio San Nicola (English: Saint Nicholas Stadium) is a multi-use all-seater stadium designed by Renzo Piano in Bari, Italy. It is currently used mostly for football matches and is the home stadium of SSC Bari. It replaced their previous home, Stadio della Vittoria, in 1990. The stadium's design resembles a flower. To create this particular design, the stadium consists of 26 'petals' and upper tiers of the higher ring separated by 8-metre empty spaces, sufficient to guarantee satisfactory security conditions.

Being the third largest football stadium in Italy after Milan's San Siro and Rome's Stadio Olimpico; as well as the largest to be used by only one team, San Nicola holds 58,270 people, and was filled to capacity for the first time during a 2013–2014 Serie B playoff match for A.S. Bari in June 2014. Before that, the stadium's largest attendance was 52,000 for an A.S. Bari Serie A match during the 2009–10 season.

== History ==
The stadium was built in 1990 for the 1990 FIFA World Cup, during which it hosted five matches: Soviet Union vs. Romania, Cameroon vs. Romania, and Cameroon vs. Soviet Union in group B action; in the round of 16 matches, Czechoslovakia vs. Costa Rica; and the third place match between Italy and England.

It hosted the 1991 European Cup Final, won by Red Star Belgrade. It was also the venue for the 1997 Mediterranean Games.

The stadium hosted the UEFA Euro 2008 qualifying Group B between Italy and Scotland in March 2007, which Italy won 2–0, and was also a deciding match for the Unofficial World Football Championships.

The Stadio San Nicola hosted Italy's 2010 FIFA World Cup qualification against the Republic of Ireland on 1 April 2009. Italy were booed off the field after Ireland shocked the nation by scoring in the 87th minute. The match ended in a 1–1 draw.

== 1990 FIFA World Cup ==
The stadium was one of the venues of the 1990 FIFA World Cup, and held the following matches:

Date	Team No. 1	Res.	Team No. 2	Round	Attendance
9 June 1990	Soviet Union	0–2	Romania	Group B	42,907
14 June 1990	Cameroon	2–1	Romania	Group B	38,687
18 June 1990	Cameroon	0–4	Soviet Union	Group B	37,307
23 June 1990	Czechoslovakia	4–1	Costa Rica	Round of 16	47,673
7 July 1990	Italy	2–1	England	Third place match	51,426
