= Mehdi Dorval =

Algerian footballer (born 2001)

Personal information
- Full name: Emile Mehdi Dorval
- Date of birth: 9 February 2001 (age 25)
- Place of birth: Paris, France
- Height: 1.76 m (5 ft 9 in)
- Position: Right-back

Team information
- Current team: Catanzaro
- Number: 93

Youth career
- –2020: Amiens
- 2020–2021: Aubervilliers

Senior career*
Years	Team	Apps	(Gls)
2020–2021	Aubervilliers	2	(0)
2021	Fasano	16	(0)
2021–2022	Audace Cerignola	34	(1)
2022–2026	Bari	123	(6)
2026–	Catanzaro	1	(0)

International career^{‡}
2023	Algeria U23	2	(0)
2025–	Algeria	4	(0)
- * Club domestic league appearances and goals as of 21 August 2026 ‡ National team caps and goals as of 1 April 2026

Emile Mehdi Dorval (born 9 February 2001) is a professional footballer who plays as a right-back for Serie B club Catanzaro. Born in France, he plays for the Algeria national team.

== Club career ==
Dorval began his senior career at Aubervilliers, before moving to Italy in early 2021, and playing for Serie D clubs Fasano and Audace Cerignola.

On 2 July 2022, Dorval signed a three-year contract with Serie B club Bari. He made his debut for the club on 28 August 2022, in a 1–3 league win over Perugia.

In April 2023, he renewed his deal with Bari until June 2026. Dorval was racially abused by Cremonese player Franco Vázquez during the Bari - Cremonese game on 16 February 2025.

== International career ==
Dorval was born in France to a Réunionnais father and Algerian mother. He was called up to the Algeria national team for a set of 2026 FIFA World Cup qualification matches in October 2025.
