= Raffaele Pucino =

Italian footballer

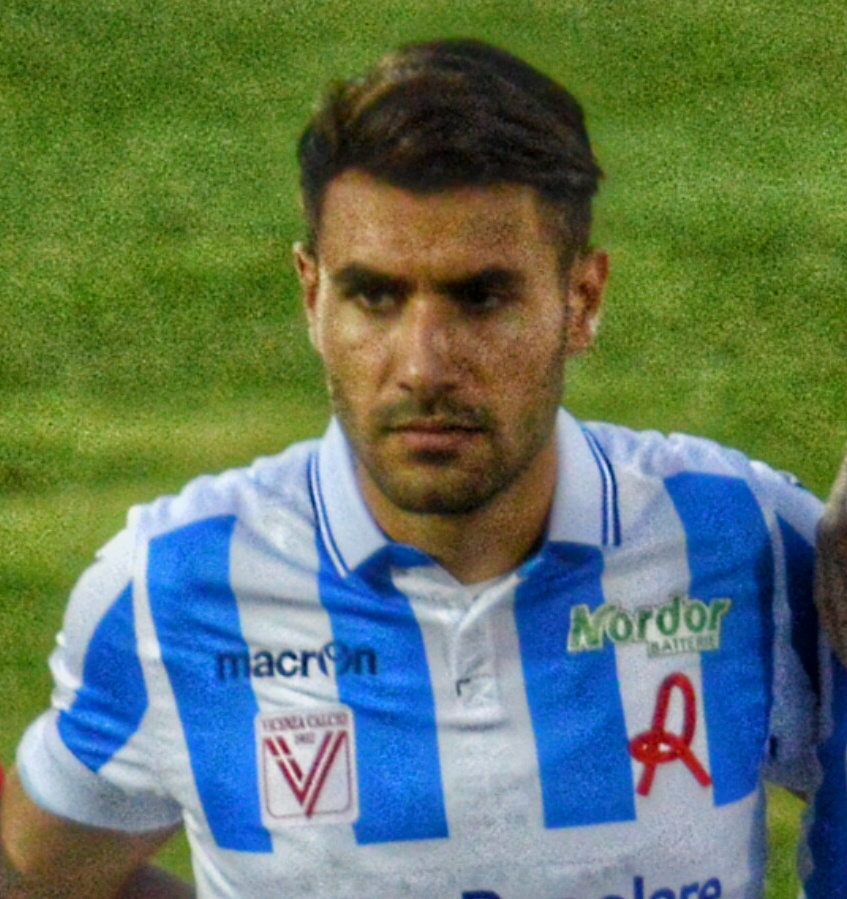

Personal information
- Date of birth: 3 May 1991 (age 35)
- Place of birth: Caserta, Italy
- Height: 1.83 m (6 ft 0 in)
- Positions: Right back; centre back

Team information
- Current team: Monopoli
- Number: 2

Youth career
- Boys Caserta
- Napoli
- Empoli
- Casertana
- Atletico Nola

Senior career*
Years	Team	Apps	(Gls)
2009–2011	Alessandria	44	(0)
2011–2013	Varese	69	(3)
2013–2014	Sassuolo	3	(0)
2014–2017	Chievo	0	(0)
2014–2015	→ Pescara (loan)	36	(0)
2015–2016	→ Virtus Lanciano (loan)	20	(0)
2016	→ Avellino (loan)	13	(0)
2016–2017	→ Vicenza (loan)	36	(5)
2017–2019	Salernitana	50	(4)
2019–2021	Ascoli	49	(2)
2021–2026	Bari	129	(3)
2026–	Monopoli	1	(0)
- * Club domestic league appearances and goals as of 29 August 2026

Raffaele Pucino (born 3 May 1991) is an Italian footballer who plays as a defender for Serie C Group C club Monopoli.

== Career ==
=== Early career ===
Born in Caserta, Italy, Pucino began his youth career with local side Boys Caserta, before he was scouted by S.S.C. Napoli. His stay in Naples was short-lived, however, and soon after, Pucino moved to Tuscany, with the youth academy of Empoli F.C. He started playing football in the youth team of Empoli, before moving back to his hometown with Casertana F.C. to finish out his youth career. Pucino also earned his first two senior caps with Casertana, during the 2007–08 Lega Pro season. In the summer of 2009, however, Pucino was on the move once more; he transferred to Atletico Nova, where he joined the club's youth set-up.

In 2009, Pucino transferred to U.S. Alessandria, a team that played in the Lega Pro Prima Divisione. In his first season with the club, the young defender went on to make 16 league appearances for his team: 13 of which, were starts. His second season proved even more successful, as he integrated himself into the club's starting line-up. He made 27 league appearances for Alessandria during the 2010-11 Lega Pro Prima Divisione season, which attracted the interest of several Serie B clubs.

=== Varese ===
On 24 July 2011, Pucino completed a transfer to Serie B outfit, A.S. Varese on a co-ownership agreement with Alessandria. He made his debut for the club on 27 August 2011 in a 0–0 league match versus A.S. Bari, and scored his first professional goal on 4 October 2011 in a 0–2 away win over Vicenza. At the conclusion of the 2011-12 Serie B campaign, the team from Lomardy finished the season 5th in the league standings and in the promotion play-off positions, where they lost in the final to U.C. Sampdoria, after defeating Hellas Verona in the semi-final play-off.

On 20 June 2012, Varese purchased the player outright, although they subsequently sold 50% of his contract to A.C. ChievoVerona, for €350,000. During the 2012–13 Serie B campaign, Pucino remained with Varese and continued to be an integral part of the team's lineup, scoring 2 goals in 33 league matches, which helped the team to a 7th-place position in the league standings, just 2 points shy of the promotion play-off slots.

At the end of the season, the two companies agreed to the renewal of the co-ownership agreement and the loan of Pucino to Varese for the 2013–14 Serie B campaign.

=== Sassuolo ===
Less than a month after beginning the 2013–14 season, on 2 September 2013, it was announced that newly promoted Serie A team Sassuolo had signed with Pucino for €620,000, with Varese receiving €600,000.

In June 2014 Chievo bought back Pucino for €300,000.

=== Chievo ===
Chievo purchased the full registration rights of Pucino in 2014. On 21 July 2016 he was signed by Vicenza Calcio in a temporary deal.

=== Ascoli ===
On 14 August 2019, he signed a 2-year contract with Ascoli.

=== Bari ===
On 2 September 2021, he moved to Bari in Serie C on a two-year deal.

== Honours ==
Bari

- Serie C: 2021–22 (Group C)
