= Mousa Balla Sowe =

Gambian professional footballer

Personal information
- Date of birth: 2 February 1997 (age 29)
- Place of birth: Banjul, Gambia
- Height: 1.74 m (5 ft 9 in)
- Position: Winger

Team information
- Current team: Milazzo

Youth career
- Real de Banjul

Senior career*
Years	Team	Apps	(Gls)
2013–2015	Real de Banjul	0	(0)
2015–2016	Parma	3	(0)
2017–2018	Vibonese	32	(8)
2018–2019	Gela	28	(7)
2019–2020	Turris	21	(5)
2020–2021	Monterosi	29	(6)
2021–2022	Atletico Terme Fiuggi	22	(9)
2022	Hamrun Spartans	1	(0)
2022	Afragolese	10	(0)
2022–2023	Porto d'Ascoli	11	(0)
2023	Cavese	8	(0)
2023–2024	Prato	11	(0)
2024–2025	Scafatese	20	(0)
2025	Cassino	7	(0)
2025	Portici		
2025–2026	Pompei	6	(0)
2026–	Milazzo	0	(0)
- * Club domestic league appearances and goals as of 26 September 2026

Mousa Balla Sowe (born 2 February 1997) is a Gambian professional footballer who plays as a winger for Milazzo.

== Club career ==
Sowe joined Serie D club Gela for the 2018–19 season.
