= Manuel Marras =

Italian footballer

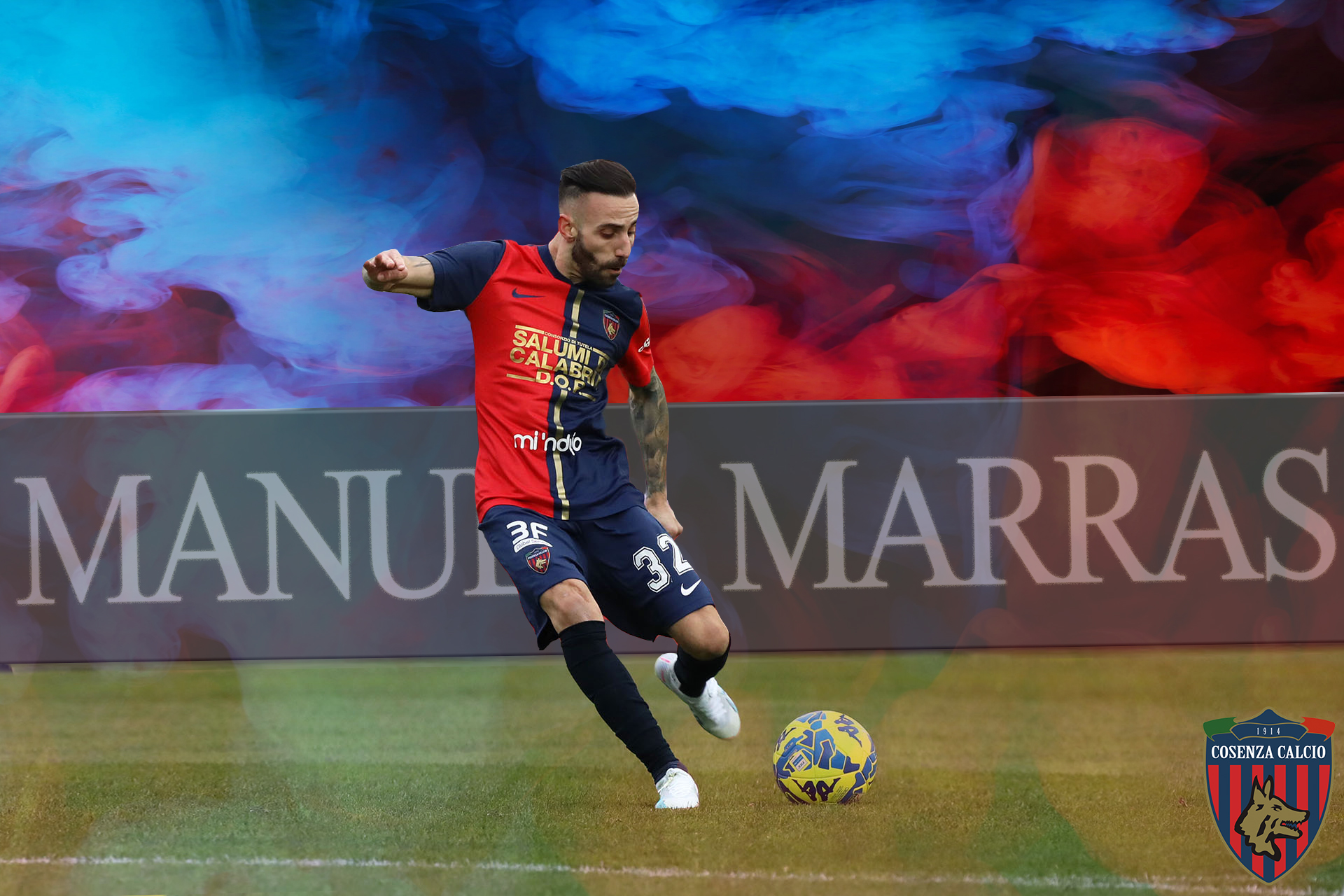
- Manuel Marras

Personal information
- Date of birth: 9 July 1993 (age 33)
- Place of birth: Genoa, Italy
- Height: 1.68 m (5 ft 6 in)
- Position: Midfielder

Team information
- Current team: Union Brescia
- Number: 17

Youth career
- Genoa
- 2010–2012: Spezia

Senior career*
Years	Team	Apps	(Gls)
2011–2015	Spezia	2	(0)
2012–2013	→ Rimini (loan)	21	(3)
2013–2014	→ Savona (loan)	19	(0)
2014–2015	→ Südtirol (loan)	33	(5)
2015–2017	Alessandria	60	(5)
2017–2018	Trapani Calcio	33	(3)
2018–2019	Pescara	31	(0)
2019–2020	Livorno	26	(8)
2020–2023	Bari	51	(9)
2022	→ Crotone (loan)	15	(3)
2023	→ Cosenza (loan)	15	(1)
2023–2024	Cosenza	33	(2)
2024–2026	Reggiana	44	(1)
2026–	Union Brescia	17	(2)
- * Club domestic league appearances and goals as of 29 April 2026

Manuel Marras (born 9 July 1993) is an Italian footballer who plays for Serie C Group A club Union Brescia.

== Biography ==
Born in Genoa, capital of Liguria region, Marras was a youth product of Genoa C.F.C. He was the member of U16 and U17 team from 2008 to 2010. In 2010, he was signed by Spezia, another Ligurian club. Marras was a player of the reserve team. Marras also made his professional debut for the champion of the third division during 2011–12 Lega Pro Prima Divisione. Marras played once for Lega Pro U20 representative team against England C on 28 February 2012.

On 30 July 2012 Marras left for the fourth division club Rimini in temporary deal. On 23 July 2013 he was signed by Savona.

In the 2014–15 season, Marras played for Südtirol.

In the summer 2015 he was signed by Alessandria. After 2 seasons with Alessandria on 16 August 2017 he was signed by Trapani Calcio.

On 13 July 2018 he signed for Serie B club Pescara.

On 2 September 2019, he signed with Livorno.

On 15 September 2020 he joined Bari on a 3-year contract. On 28 January 2022, he moved to Serie B club Crotone on loan with a conditional obligation to buy. On 18 January 2023, Marras was loaned by Cosenza.

On 11 August 2023, Marras returned to Cosenza on a permanent basis and signed a two-year contract.

On 30 August 2024, Marras moved to Reggiana on a two-year deal.

== Career statistics ==
As of match played on 1 April 2023

Club statistics
Club	Season	League			National Cup		Other		Total	
Club	Season	Division	Apps	Goals	Apps	Goals	Apps	Goals	Apps	Goals
Spezia	2011–12	Lega Pro Prima Divisione	2	0	0	0	—		2	0
Spezia	2012–13	Serie B	0	0	0	0	—		0	0
Spezia	2013–14	Serie B	0	0	0	0	—		0	0
Spezia	2014–15	Serie B	0	0	0	0	—		0	0
Spezia	Total		2	0	0	0	0	0	2	0
Rimini (loan)	2012–13	Lega Pro Seconda Divisione	21	3	0	0	3 (Note: Appearances in the 2012–13 Relegation play-offs)	0	24	3
Savona (loan)	2013–14	Lega Pro Prima Divisione	19	0	2	0	3 (Note: Two appearances in the 2013–14 Promotion play-offs and One appearance in the Coppa Italia Lega Pro)	1	24	1
FC Südtirol (loan)	2014–15	Lega Pro	33	5	2	0	1 (Note: Appearance(s) in the Coppa Italia Lega Pro)	0	36	5
Alessandria	2015–16	Lega Pro	29	2	6	1	2 (Note: One appearance in both the Coppa Italia Lega Pro and the 2015–16 Promotion play-offs)	0	37	3
Alessandria	2016–17	Lega Pro	31	3	2	0	5	1	38	4
Alessandria	Total		60	5	8	1	7	1	75	7
Trapani	2017–18	Serie C	33	3	0	0	3 (Note: Two appearances in the 2017–18 Promotion play-offs and One appearance in the Coppa Italia Serie C)	0	36	3
Pescara	2018–19	Serie B	31	0	0	0	2 (Note: Appearances in the 2018–19 Promotion play-offs)	0	33	0
Livorno	2019–20	Serie B	26	8	0	0	—		26	8
Bari	2020–21	Serie C	32	7	2	1	3 (Note: Appearances in the 2020–21 Promotion play-offs)	1	37	9
Bari	2021–22	Serie C	10	1	0	0	—		10	1
Bari	2022–23	Serie B	0	0	0	0	—		0	0
Bari	Total		51	9	2	1	3	1	56	10
Crotone (loan)	2021–22	Serie B	15	3	0	0	1	0	16	3
Cosenza Calcio	2022–23	Serie B	9	1	0	0	—		9	1
Career totals			291	36	14	2	23	3	325	41
