= Andrea D'Errico =

Italian footballer (born 1992)

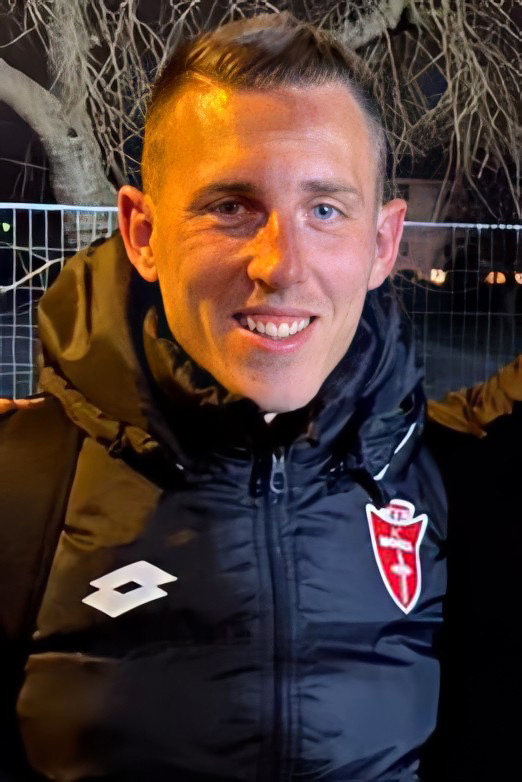
- D'Errico in 2020

Personal information
- Date of birth: 24 March 1992 (age 34)
- Place of birth: Milan, Italy
- Height: 1.74 m (5 ft 9 in)
- Positions: Attacking midfielder; forward

Team information
- Current team: Arconatese

Youth career
- 2008–2009: Pavia

Senior career*
Years	Team	Apps	(Gls)
2009–2013	Pavia	35	(4)
2012–2013	→ Fidelis Andria (loan)	25	(1)
2013–2014	Barletta	26	(2)
2014–2015	Pro Patria	25	(4)
2015–2021	Monza	178	(43)
2021–2025	Bari	44	(4)
2023	→ Crotone (loan)	13	(3)
2023–2024	→ Crotone (loan)	12	(0)
2024–2025	→ Sporting Dubai (loan)	7	(2)
2025–	Arconatese		
- * Club domestic league appearances and goals as of 21 November 2024

Andrea D'Errico (Italian pronunciation: [anˈdrɛːa derˈriːko]; born 24 March 1992) is an Italian professional footballer who plays as an attacking midfielder or forward for fifth-tier amateur side Arconatese.

== Career ==
D'Errico scored his first Serie B goal on 7 May 2021, helping Monza beat Cosenza 3–0 away from home. On 7 July 2021, he left Monza after six seasons; he scored 48 goals in 204 games in all competitions.

On 8 July 2021, D'Errico joined Serie C side Bari.

On 9 January 2023, he joined Serie C side Crotone on loan. After returning to Bari and appearing in one 2023–24 Coppa Italia game for them, on 1 September 2023 D'Errico returned to Crotone on a new loan with a conditional obligation to buy.

On 1 October 2024, D'Errico moved on loan to Sporting Dubai in the UAE Third Division League.

Ad aprile 2026 sbarca in Kings League Italia con le Zebras con cui giocherà le ultime partite del secondo split prima di essere eliminato ai play-in.

== Honours ==
Monza

- Serie C Group A: 2019–20
- Serie D Group B: 2016–17
- Scudetto Dilettanti: 2016–17

Bari

- Serie C: 2021–22 (Group C)
