= Emmanuele Matino =

Italian footballer (born 1998)

Personal information
- Date of birth: 7 October 1998 (age 28)
- Place of birth: Naples, Italy
- Height: 1.86 m (6 ft 1 in)
- Position: Defender

Team information
- Current team: Casarano

Youth career
- 2015–2017: Latina

Senior career*
Years	Team	Apps	(Gls)
2014–2015	Puteolana	11	(1)
2015–2017	Latina	0	(0)
2017	→ Nocerina (loan)	3	(0)
2017–2018	Nocerina	31	(2)
2018–2020	Parma	0	(0)
2018–2019	→ Potenza (loan)	14	(2)
2019–2020	→ Cavese (loan)	27	(3)
2020–2021	Cavese	28	(1)
2021–2022	Potenza	24	(1)
2022–2023	Juve Stabia	0	(0)
2022–2023	→ Potenza (loan)	18	(2)
2023	Potenza	0	(0)
2023–2025	Bari	18	(0)
2025	→ Cittadella (loan)	6	(0)
2025–2026	Salernitana	31	(0)
2026–	Casarano	0	(0)
- * Club domestic league appearances and goals as of 29 August 2026

Emmanuele Matino (born 7 October 1998) is an Italian football player who plays for Serie C Group C club Casarano.

== Club career ==
=== Serie D and Latina ===
He started his career at the age of 16 with Serie D club Puteolana. In August 2015, he joined Latina and was assigned to their Under-19 team, only making one bench appearance in Serie B before being sent on loan to another Serie D club Nocerina in January 2017. At the end of 2016–17 season, his parent club Latina went bankrupt, and he stayed in Nocerina on a permanent basis, spending another season in the Serie D.

=== Parma ===
On 6 July 2018, he signed a three-year contract with Serie A club Parma.

==== Loan to Potenza ====
On 18 July 2018, he was loaned by Parma to Serie C club Potenza. He made his Serie C debut for Potenza on 25 September 2018 in a game against Juve Stabia as a 75th-minute substitute for Nicola Strambelli.

=== Cavese ===
On 10 July 2019, he joined Cavese on loan. On 25 September 2020, he moved to Cavese on a permanent basis and signed a two-year contract.

=== Juve Stabia ===
On 20 July 2022, Matino signed with Juve Stabia. On 1 September 2022, he was loaned back to Potenza, with an option to buy.

=== Bari ===
On 31 January 2023, Matino joined Serie B club Bari on loan with an obligation to buy, signing a contract until 2026 with the club.

==== Loan to Cittadella ====
On 30 January 2025, he joined Cittadella on loan.
