= Simone Simeri =

Italian footballer

Personal information
- Date of birth: 12 April 1993 (age 33)
- Place of birth: Naples, Italy
- Height: 1.79 m (5 ft 10 in)
- Position: Forward

Team information
- Current team: Nocerina
- Number: 20

Youth career
- Napoli

Senior career*
Years	Team	Apps	(Gls)
2011–2014	Melfi	39	(2)
2014	Puteolana Internapoli	10	(4)
2014–2015	Rende	15	(10)
2015–2016	Potenza	28	(13)
2016–2017	Folgore Caratese	30	(21)
2017–2018	Novara	0	(0)
2017–2018	→ Juve Stabia (loan)	36	(12)
2018–2024	Bari	92	(27)
2021	→ Ascoli (loan)	9	(0)
2022–2023	→ Monopoli (loan)	14	(1)
2023	→ Imolese (loan)	17	(7)
2023–2024	→ Carrarese (loan)	20	(1)
2024	→ Taranto (loan)	14	(4)
2024	Folgore Caratese	9	(5)
2025	Pistoiese	20	(6)
2025–	Nocerina	23	(3)
- * Club domestic league appearances and goals as of 22 Juny 2026

Simone Simeri (born 12 April 1993) is an Italian footballer who plays as a forward for Serie D club Nocerina.

== Career ==
=== Napoli ===
Born in Naples, Campania region, Simeri started his career at Napoli. He was a player of Napoli's under-17 team in National Allievi League in 2009–10 season; under-16 team in Campania Regional Allievi League in 2008–09 season; under-15 team in National Giovanissimi League in 2007–08 season and under-14 team in Campania Regional Giovanissimi League in 2006–07 season.

=== Melfi ===
In summer 2011 he was signed by Lega Pro Seconda Divisione club Melfi in a co-ownership deal, for a peppercorn of €500. The deal was renewed in June 2012 and terminated in June 2013, in favour of Melfi.

=== Serie D clubs ===
Simeri left Melfi for Puteolana Internapoli in summer 2014.

=== Novara ===
After 3 seasons with several Serie D clubs, he was signed by Serie B club Novara on 1 July 2017. He was assigned number 9 shirt.

=== Bari ===
==== Loans ====
On 21 January 2021, he joined Serie B club Ascoli on loan.

On 29 July 2022, Simeri was loaned to Monopoli. On 6 January 2023, Simeri moved on a new loan to Imolese.

On 14 July 2023, he joined Carrarese on loan. On 27 January 2024, Simeri signed with Taranto on loan.

== Honours ==
Bari

- Serie C: 2021–22 (Group C)
