= Gregorio Morachioli =

Italian footballer

Personal information
- Date of birth: 27 February 2000 (age 26)
- Place of birth: La Spezia, Italy
- Height: 1.72 m (5 ft 8 in)
- Position: Winger

Team information
- Current team: Livorno (on loan from Juve Stabia)
- Number: 18

Youth career
- –2018: Spezia
- 2016–2018: Juventus

Senior career*
Years	Team	Apps	(Gls)
2018–2021	Spezia	0	(0)
2019–2020	→ Pistoiese (loan)	12	(0)
2020–2021	→ Imolese (loan)	21	(2)
2021–2023	Renate	46	(0)
2023–2024	Bari	34	(1)
2024–	Juve Stabia	3	(0)
2026–	→ Livorno (loan)	1	(0)
- * Club domestic league appearances and goals as of 26 September 2026

Gregorio Morachioli (born 27 February 2000) is an Italian professional footballer who plays as a winger for Serie C Group B club Livorno on loan from Juve Stabia.

== Club career ==
Born in La Spezia, Morachioli was formed on local club Spezia Calcio, and a loan to Juventus FC Youth Sector. He was loaned to Pistoiese for the 2019–20, and made his Serie C and professional debut on 15 September 2019 against Carrarese.

On 7 May 2021, he signed for Renate.

On 31 January 2023, Morachioli joined Serie B club Bari for an undisclosed fee, signing a deal until June 2026.

On 30 August 2024, he moved to Juve Stabia on a two-year deal.
