= 2022–23 Parma Calcio 1913 season =

109th season in existence of Parma Calcio 1913

Parma
2022–23 season
- Owner: Kyle Krause
- Manager: Fabio Pecchia
- Stadium: Stadio Ennio Tardini
- Serie B: 4th (play-off semi-finals)
- Coppa Italia: Round of 16
- Top goalscorer: League: Franco Vázquez (11); All: Franco Vázquez (11)

The 2022–23 season was the 109th in the history of Parma Calcio 1913. The club participated in Serie B and the Coppa Italia.

== Season events ==
=== Summer ===
On 29 May 2022, Parma announced the signing of Nathan Buayi-Kiala from Lille.

On 4 June, Parma announced the signing of Elias Cobbaut from Anderlecht.

On 21 June, Parma announced the signing of Enrico Del Prato from Atalanta.

On 24 June, Parma announced the signing of Simone Romagnoli from Empoli.

On 1 July, Parma announced the signing of Nahuel Estévez from Crotone.

On 14 July, Parma announced the signing of Leandro Chichizola from Perugia.

On 22 August, Parma announced the singing of Cristian Ansaldi from Torino.

On 30 August, Parma announced the signing of Gabriel Charpentier from Genoa.

=== Winter ===
On 18 January, Gennaro Tutino joined Palermo on loan for the remainder of the season with an option to make the move permanent.

On 29 January, Parma loaned Luca Zanimacchia from Cremonese until the end of the season, with an option to buy and a buy-back option for Cremonese.

== Squad ==
As of match played 3 June 2023

No.	Name	Nationality	Position	Date of birth (age)	Signed from	Signed in	Contract ends	Apps.	Goals
Goalkeepers
1	Gianluigi Buffon	(Italy)	GK	28 January 1978 (aged 45)	Juventus	2021	2024	265	0
22	Leandro Chichizola	(Argentina)	GK	27 March 1990 (aged 33)	Perugia	2022		20	0
29	Antonio Santurro	(Dominican Republic)	GK	29 February 1992 (aged 31)	Udinese	2022		0	0
40	Edoardo Corvi	(Italy)	GK	23 March 2001 (aged 22)	Academy	2021		6	0
44	Francesco Borriello	(Italy)	GK	25 July 2005 (aged 17)	Catania	2022		0	0
Defenders
3	Yordan Osorio	(Venezuela)	DF	10 May 1994 (aged 29)	Porto	2020	2024	71	0
4	Botond Balogh	(Hungary)	DF	6 June 2002 (aged 20)	MTK Budapest	2019		26	0
14	Cristian Ansaldi	(Argentina)	DF	20 September 1986 (aged 36)	Torino	2022		22	1
25	Elias Cobbaut	(Belgium)	DF	24 November 1997 (aged 25)	Anderlecht	2022		46	2
26	Woyo Coulibaly	(France)	DF	26 May 1999 (aged 24)	Le Havre	2021	2025	44	1
30	Lautaro Valenti	(Argentina)	DF	14 January 1999 (aged 24)	Lanús	2021		42	1
39	Alessandro Circati	(Australia)	DF	10 October 2003 (aged 19)	Perth Glory	2021		23	0
47	Vasilios Zagaritis	(Greece)	DF	4 May 2001 (aged 22)	Panathinaikos	2021		21	0
Midfielders
8	Nahuel Estévez	(Argentina)	MF	14 November 1995 (aged 27)	Estudiantes	2022		41	0
10	Franco Vázquez	(Argentina)	MF	22 February 1989 (aged 34)	Sevilla	2021	2023	75	25
15	Enrico Del Prato	(Italy)	MF	10 November 1999 (aged 23)	Atalanta	2022		73	4
16	Adrián Bernabé	(Spain)	MF	26 May 2001 (aged 22)	Manchester City	2021	2024	49	6
19	Simon Sohm	(Switzerland)	MF	11 April 2001 (aged 22)	Zürich	2020		82	2
20	Antoine Hainaut	(France)	MF	18 February 2002 (aged 21)	US Boulogne	2022		15	0
23	Drissa Camara	(Ivory Coast)	MF	18 February 2002 (aged 21)	Academy	2020		32	5
24	Stanko Jurić	(Croatia)	MF	16 August 1996 (aged 26)	Hajduk Split	2021	2025	71	4
28	Valentin Mihăilă	(Romania)	MF	2 February 2000 (aged 23)	Universitatea Craiova	2020	2025	49	9
59	Nathan Buayi-Kiala	(France)	MF	29 February 2004 (aged 19)	Lille	2022		0	0
98	Dennis Man	(Romania)	MF	26 August 1998 (aged 24)	FCSB	2021	2025	73	11
Forwards
7	Adrian Benedyczak	(Poland)	FW	24 November 2000 (aged 22)	Pogoń Szczecin	2021	2025	69	16
9	Gabriel Charpentier	(Republic of the Congo)	FW	17 May 1999 (aged 24)	Genoa	2022		9	0
13	Ange-Yoan Bonny	(France)	FW	25 October 2003 (aged 19)	Châteauroux	2021	2024	41	1
17	Luca Zanimacchia	(Italy)	FW	19 July 1998 (aged 24)	on loan from Cremonese	2023	2023	18	1
45	Roberto Inglese	(Italy)	FW	12 November 1991 (aged 31)	Napoli	2020		104	20
84	Dario Šits	(Latvia)	FW	4 February 2004 (aged 19)	Metta	2021	2026	6	0
Out on loan
11	Gennaro Tutino	(Italy)	FW	20 August 1996 (aged 26)	Napoli	2022		45	7
Left during the season
5	Simone Romagnoli	(Italy)	DF	9 February 1990 (aged 33)	Empoli	2022		7	0
17	Jayden Oosterwolde	(Netherlands)	DF	26 April 2001 (aged 22)	Twente	2022		24	1

== Transfers ==
=== In ===
Date	Position	Nationality	Name	From	Fee	Ref.
29 May 2022	MF	(France)	Nathan Buayi-Kiala	Lille	Free transfer	
4 June 2022	DF	(Belgium)	Elias Cobbaut	Anderlecht	Undisclosed	
21 June 2022	MF	(Italy)	Enrico Del Prato	Atalanta	Undisclosed	
24 June 2022	DF	(Italy)	Simone Romagnoli	Empoli	Undisclosed	
1 July 2022	MF	(Argentina)	Nahuel Estévez	Crotone	Undisclosed	
14 July 2022	GK	(Argentina)	Leandro Chichizola	Perugia	Undisclosed	
22 August 2022	DF	(Argentina)	Cristian Ansaldi	Torino	Undisclosed	
30 August 2022	FW	(Republic of the Congo)	Gabriel Charpentier	Genoa	Undisclosed	

=== Loans in ===
Start date	Position	Nationality	Name	From	End date	Ref.
29 January 2023	FW	(Italy)	Luca Zanimacchia	Cremonese	End of season	

=== Out ===
Date	Position	Nationality	Name	To	Fee	Ref.
30 June 2022	FW	(Italy)	Walid Cheddira	Bari	Undisclosed	
30 January 2023	DF	(Netherlands)	Jayden Oosterwolde	Fenerbahçe	Undisclosed	

=== Loans out ===
Start date	Position	Nationality	Name	To	End date	Ref.
7 July 2022	FW	(Argentina)	Fabian Pavone	Fidelis Andria		
18 January 2023	FW	(Italy)	Gennaro Tutino	Palermo	End of season	

=== Released ===
Date	Position	Nationality	Name	Joined	Date	Ref
30 June 2022	MF	(Italy)	Mattia Sprocati	Südtirol	4 July 2022	

== Pre-season and friendlies ==
Win Draw Loss Fixtures

16 July 2022 Friendly	Sampdoria (Italy)	1–1	(Italy) Parma	Temù
17:00 CEST (UTC+2)	Léris 51'	Report	Jurić 35'	Stadium: Temù Sports Centre; Referee: Federico La Penna

24 July 2022 Friendly	Parma (Italy)	2–0	(Italy) Feralpisalò	Pinzolo
17:00 CEST (UTC+2)

29 July 2022 Friendly	Parma (Italy)	1–0	(Italy) Lecce	Parma
20:30 CEST (UTC+2)	Mihăilă 50'			Stadium: Stadio Ennio Tardini; Attendance: 2,358; Referee: Alessandro Prontera

== Competitions ==
=== Overall record ===
Competition	First match	Last match	Starting round	Final position	Record							
Competition	First match	Last match	Starting round	Final position	Pld	W	D	L	GF	GA	GD	Win %
Serie B	12 August 2022	19 May 2023	Matchday 1	4th	38	17	10	11	48	39	+9	44.74
Serie B Playoffs	30 May 2023	3 June 2023	Semifinal	Semifinal	2	0	1	1	2	3	−1	0.00
Coppa Italia	7 August 2022	10 January 2023	Round of 64	Round of 16	3	2	0	1	4	2	+2	66.67
Total					43	19	11	13	54	44	+10	44.19

Source: Soccerway

=== Serie B ===
==== League table ====
Pos	Team	Pld	W	D	L	GF	GA	GD	Pts	Promotion, qualification or relegation
2	Genoa (Note: Genoa were deducted one point due to income tax payment irregularities.) (P)	38	21	11	6	53	28	+25	73	Promotion to Serie A
3	Bari	38	17	14	7	58	37	+21	65	Qualification for promotion play-offs semi-finals
4	Parma (Note: Parma were deducted one point for missing the deadline to fulfil obligations for February taxes on the salary bill.)	38	17	10	11	48	39	+9	60 (Note: Parma finished ahead of Cagliari on head-to-head points: Cagliari 1–1 Parma, Parma 2–1 Cagliari.)	Qualification for promotion play-offs semi-finals
5	Cagliari (O, P)	38	15	15	8	50	34	+16	60	Qualification for promotion play-offs preliminary round
6	Südtirol	38	14	16	8	38	34	+4	58	Qualification for promotion play-offs preliminary round

Source: Soccerway (in English)
Rules for classification: 1) Points; 2) Head-to-head points; 3) Head-to-head goal difference; 4) Goal difference; 5) Goals scored; 6) Draw.
(O) Play-off winners; (P) Promoted

==== Results summary ====
Overall								Home						Away					
Pld	W	D	L	GF	GA	GD	Pts	W	D	L	GF	GA	GD	W	D	L	GF	GA	GD
38	17	10	11	48	39	+9	61	11	2	6	26	16	+10	6	8	5	22	23	−1

==== Results by round ====
Round	1	2	3	4	5	6	7	8	9	10	11	12	13	14	15	16	17	18	19	20	21	22	23	24	25	26	27	28	29	30	31	32	33	34	35	36	37	38
Ground	H	A	H	A	H	A	H	A	H	A	H	A	H	H	A	H	A	H	A	A	H	A	H	A	H	A	H	A	H	A	H	A	A	H	A	H	A	H
Result	D	D	W	D	L	W	W	D	W	L	W	L	W	L	D	L	W	L	D	L	W	L	W	D	L	W	L	W	D	L	W	W	D	W	D	W	W	W
Position	10	14	8	10	14	8	7	7	6	8	6	6	4	6	4	7	5	6	6	9	7	10	7	8	11	7	8	7	8	9	7	7	7	5	5	5	5	4

Source: WorldFootball.net
A = Away; H = Home; W = Win; D = Draw; L = Loss; = Leader and promotion to Serie A; = Promotion to Serie A; = Play-off semifinals; = Play-off preliminary round; = Play-out; = Relegation to Serie C

==== Results ====
The league fixtures were announced on 15 July 2022.

12 August 2022 1	Parma	2–2	Bari	Parma
20:45 CEST (UTC+2)	Man 3'; Estévez (yellow card) 8'; Valenti (yellow card) 38'; Mihăilă 45+2' (yellow card) 45+2'; Bernabé (yellow card) 54'; Del Prato (yellow card) 90'	Report	Terranova (yellow card) 3'; Antenucci 11' (pen.); Folorunsho 35'; Cheddira (yellow card) 38'; Mallamo (yellow card) 79'	Stadium: Stadio Ennio Tardini; Referee: Davide Massa

20 August 2022 2	Perugia	0–0	Parma	Perugia
20:45 CEST (UTC+2)	Dell'Orco (yellow card) 19'; Melchiorri (yellow card) 57'	Report	Estévez (yellow card) 18'	Stadium: Stadio Renato Curi; Referee: Marco Serra

28 August 2022 3	Parma	1–0	Cosenza	Parma
20:45 CEST (UTC+2)	Inglese 29'; Coulibaly (yellow card) 37'; Bernabé (yellow card) 64'; Bonny (yellow card) 70'; Ansaldi (yellow card) 86'; Jurić (yellow card) 90+4'	Report	Rispoli (yellow card) 65'	Stadium: Stadio Ennio Tardini; Referee: Daniele Perenzoni

3 September 2022 4	Perugia	3–3	Parma	Genoa
16:15 CEST (UTC+2)	Frendrup 16'; Badelj (yellow card) 27'; Guðmundsson (yellow card) 40' (yellow-red card) 90+2'; Hefti 42'; Coda 51' (pen.); Bani (yellow card) 63'	Report	Inglese 21'; Vázquez (yellow card) 23'; Mihăilă 37'; Jurić (yellow card) 45'; Coulibaly (yellow card) 53'; Vázquez 89'; Circati (yellow card) 90+3'	Stadium: Stadio Luigi Ferraris; Referee: Giacomo Camplone

10 September 2022 5	Parma	2–3	Ternana	Parma
14:00 CEST (UTC+2)	Del Prato 31'; Inglese 51'; Estévez (yellow card) 74'	Report	Diakite (yellow card) 19'; Coulibaly 48'; Donnarumma 67'; Capanni (yellow card) 81'; Corrado 86'	Stadium: Stadio Ennio Tardini; Referee: Daniele Paterna

17 September 2022 6	Ascoli	1–3	Parma	Ascoli Piceno
14:00 CEST (UTC+2)	Salvi (yellow card) 28'; Dionisi (yellow card) 78'; Lungoyi 79' (yellow card) 90'; Bellusci (yellow card) 90+1'	Report	Tutino 7'; Inglese 18'; Vázquez (yellow card) 20'; Oosterwolde (yellow card) 40'; Man 66'; Hainaut (yellow card) 75'; Jurić (yellow card) 90+1'	Stadium: Stadio Cino e Lillo Del Duca; Referee: Alessandro Prontera

1 October 2022 7	Parma	2–1	Frosinone	Parma
14:00 CEST (UTC+2)	Jurić (yellow card) 27'; Tutino 45+2' (pen.) (yellow card) 55'; Man 52' (pen.); Hainaut (yellow card) 66' (yellow-red card) 90+9'; Oosterwolde (yellow card) 68'; Del Prato (yellow card) 87'	Report	Sampirisi (yellow card) 30'; Frabotta (yellow card) 45+1'; Kone (yellow card) 54'; Garritano (yellow card) 55'; Moro 81'; Boloca (yellow card) 88'; Ravanelli (yellow card) 90+5'	Stadium: Stadio Ennio Tardini; Referee: Federico Dionisi

9 October 2023 8	Pisa	0–0	Parma	Pisa
14:00 CEST (UTC+2)	Beruatto (yellow card) 68'; Marin (yellow card) 69'	Report	Jurić (yellow card) 32'	Stadium: Arena Garibaldi; Referee: Luca Pairetto

15 October 2022 9	Parma	2–0	Reggina	Parma
14:00 CEST (UTC+2)	Coulibaly (yellow card) 15'; Oosterwolde (yellow card) 45+1' (goal) 51'; Valenti 74'	Report	Majer (yellow card) 73'	Stadium: Stadio Ennio Tardini; Referee: Michael Fabbri

22 October 2023 10	Südtirol	1–0	Parma	Bolzano
14:00 CEST (UTC+2)	D'Orazio (yellow card) 5'; Nicolussi 29'; Berra (yellow card) 65'	Report	Vázquez (yellow card) 13'; Oosterwolde (yellow card) 42' (yellow-red card) 78'	Stadium: Stadio Druso; Referee: Matteo Gualtieri

29 October 2022 11	Parma	1–0	Como	Parma
14:00 CEST (UTC+2)	Hainaut (yellow card) 33'; Del Prato 38'; Jurić (yellow card) 47'; Balogh (yellow card) 65'	Report	Scaglia (yellow card) 20'; Bellemo (yellow card) 27'; Iovine (yellow card) 85'	Stadium: Stadio Ennio Tardini; Referee: Alessandro Prontera

5 November 2022 12	Palermo	1–0	Parma	Palermo
16:15 CET (UTC+1)	Nedelcearu (yellow card) 45'; Marconi 57'	Report	Sohm (yellow card) 27'; Oosterwolde (yellow card) 60'	Stadium: Stadio Renzo Barbera; Referee: Lorenzo Maggioni

12 November 2022 13	Parma	3–1	Cittadella	Parma
14:00 CET (UTC+1)	Del Prato 17'; Camara 57'; Benedyczak 67'	Report	Pavan (yellow card) 47'; Antonucci 71'; Perticone (yellow card) 81'	Stadium: Stadio Ennio Tardini; Referee: Manuel Volpi

26 November 2022 14	Parma	1–2	Modena	Parma
15:00 CET (UTC+1)	Vázquez 71' (pen.)	Report	Silvestri (yellow card) 3'; Falcinelli 18'; Bonfanti 26'; Tremolada (yellow card) 44'; Renzetti (yellow card) 61'; Armellino (yellow card) 63'; Coppolaro (yellow card) 73'	Stadium: Stadio Ennio Tardini; Referee: Marco Serra

3 December 2022 15	Cagliari	1–1	Parma	Cagliari
18:00 CET (UTC+1)	Pavoletti (yellow card) 50' (goal) 54'; Nández (yellow card) 60'	Report	Chichizola (yellow card) 34'; Camara 44'; Jurić (yellow card) 71'; Osorio (yellow card) 73'	Stadium: Unipol Domus; Referee: Maria Sole Ferrieri Caputi

8 December 2022 16	Parma	0–1	Benevento	Parma
12:30 CET (UTC+1)	Valenti (yellow card) 18'; Vázquez (penalty missed) 34' (yellow card) 83'; Bonny (yellow card) 69'	Report	Forte 20'; El Kaouakibi (red card) 80'; Karić (yellow card) 90+3'; Koutsoupias (yellow card) 90+4'; Pastina (yellow card) 90+6'	Stadium: Stadio Ennio Tardini; Referee: Matteo Gariglio

12 December 2023 17	Brescia	0–2	Parma	Brescia
20:30 CET (UTC+1)	Ndoj (yellow card) 34'; Benali (yellow card) 37'; Galazzi (yellow card) 77'; Mangraviti (yellow card) 87'	Report	Man (yellow card) 13' (goal) 16'; Del Prato (yellow card) 34'; Bonny 90+5' (yellow card) 90+6'	Stadium: Stadio Mario Rigamonti; Referee: Lorenzo Maggioni

18 December 2022 18	Parma	0–1	SPAL	Parma
14:00 CEST (UTC+2)	Osorio (yellow card) 48'; Valenti (yellow card) 65'; Estévez (yellow card) 72'; Sohm (yellow card) 75'	Report	Rabbi 19'; Esposito (yellow card) 30'; Dalle Mura (yellow card) 67'; Alfonso (yellow card) 78'; Fiordaliso (yellow card) 80'; Murgia (yellow card) 84'; Zuculini (yellow card) 86'; Tripaldelli (yellow card) 90+6'	Stadium: Stadio Ennio Tardini; Referee: Luca Massimi

26 December 2022 19	Venezia	2–2	Parma	Venice
15:00 CET (UTC+1)	Andersen (yellow card) 38'; Tessmann (yellow card) 45'; Pohjanpalo 70'; Pierini 82'	Report	Vázquez 45' (pen.), 50'; Del Prato (yellow card) 47'; Estévez (yellow card) 78'; Camara (yellow card) 90+1'	Stadium: Stadio Pier Luigi Penzo; Referee: Daniele Minelli

14 January 2023 20	Bari	4–0	Parma	Bari
14:00 CET (UTC+1)	Balogh 5' (o.g.); Cheddira 13' (pen.), 43' (pen.); Salcedo 90+3'	Report	Camara (yellow card) 64'; Valenti (yellow card) 70'	Stadium: Stadio San Nicola; Referee: Niccolò Baroni

21 January 2023 21	Parma	2–0	Perugia	Parma
14:00 CET (UTC+1)	Benedyczak 12'; Osorio (yellow card) 50'; Vázquez 60'; Chichizola (yellow card) 69'; Coulibaly (yellow card) 74'	Report	Bartolomei (yellow card) 45+2'; Santoro (yellow card) 46'; Curado (yellow card) 90+1'	Stadium: Stadio Ennio Tardini; Referee: Giovanni Ayroldi

28 January 2023 22	Cosenza	1–0	Parma	Cosenza
14:00 CET (UTC+1)	Florenzi 4'; Brescianini (yellow card) 56'; D'Orazio (yellow card) 65'; Cortinovis (yellow card) 69' (yellow-red card) 70'; Marras (yellow card) 79'	Report	Balogh (yellow card) 20'; Estévez (yellow card) 42'; Bernabé (yellow card) 58'; Inglese (yellow card) 67'; Valenti (yellow card) 79'; Sohm (yellow card) 87'	Stadium: Stadio San Vito-Gigi Marulla; Referee: Ivano Pezzuto

5 February 2023 23	Parma	2–0	Genoa	Parma
16:15 CET (UTC+1)	Benedyczak 32' (yellow card) 32'; Vázquez 53' (pen.); Zagaritis (yellow card) 89'; Bernabé (yellow card) 90+8'	Report	Sabelli (yellow card) 25'; Salcedo (yellow card) 82'; Sturaro (yellow card) 90+5'; Criscito (yellow card) 90+8'	Stadium: Stadio Ennio Tardini; Referee: Francesco Fourneau

11 February 2023 24	Ternana	1–1	Parma	Terni
16:15 CET (UTC+1)	Palumbo 4'; Diakite (yellow card) 19'; Defendi (yellow card) 55'	Report	Bernabé 36'; Valenti (yellow card) 44'; Zanimacchia (yellow card) 45+2'	Stadium: Stadio Libero Liberati; Referee: Francesco Meraviglia

18 February 2023 25	Parma	0–1	Ascoli	Parma
14:00 CET (UTC+1)	Balogh (yellow card) 18'; Coulibaly (yellow card) 25'; Sohm (yellow card) 68'; Zagaritis (yellow card) 90'	Report	Büchel (yellow card) 9'; Caligara (yellow card) 52'; Gondo 62' (pen.) (yellow card) 63'; Falasco (yellow card) 68'; Giovane (yellow card) 79'	Stadium: Stadio Ennio Tardini; Referee: Niccolò Baroni

24 February 2023 26	Frosinone	3–4	Parma	Frosinone
20:30 CET (UTC+1)	Caso 25'; Mulattieri 48'; Cotali (yellow card) 64'; Boloca (yellow card) 66'; Moro 71'	Report	Vázquez 6', 73'; Ansaldi 21'; Zanimacchia 35'; Estévez (red card) 55'; Camara (red card) 86'	Stadium: Stadio Benito Stirpe; Referee: Lorenzo Maggioni

28 February 2023 27	Parma	0–1	Pisa	Parma
20:30 CET (UTC+1)	Valenti (red card) 90+5'	Report	Calabresi (yellow card) 21'; Touré 82'; Barba (yellow card) 84'	Stadium: Stadio Ennio Tardini; Referee: Gianluca Aureliano

4 March 2023 28	Reggina	0–1	Parma	Reggio
16:15 CET (UTC+1)	Majer (yellow card) 28'; Cionek (yellow card) 37'; Ménez (yellow card) 45+2'; Fabbian (yellow card) 59'	Report	Del Prato (yellow card) 11'; Vázquez (yellow card) 43' (goal) 68'	Stadium: Stadio Oreste Granillo; Referee: Massimiliano Irrati

11 March 2023 29	Parma	0–0	Südtirol	Parma
14:00 CET (UTC+1)	Ansaldi (yellow card) 44'; Sohm (yellow card) 71'	Report	Fiordilino (yellow card) 42'; Poluzzi (yellow card) 84'	Stadium: Stadio Ennio Tardini; Referee: Luca Zufferli

18 March 2023 30	Como	2–0	Parma	Como
14:00 CEST (UTC+2)	Cerri 5'; Odenthal (yellow card) 33'; Arrigoni 53'; Faragò (yellow card) 86'	Report	Circati (red card) 61'; Zagaritis (yellow card) 80'	Stadium: Stadio Giuseppe Sinigaglia; Referee: Francesco Meraviglia

1 April 2023 31	Parma	2–1	Palermo	Parma
14:00 CEST (UTC+2)	Benedyczak 32'; Bernabé (yellow card) 53'; Coulibaly 77'; Vázquez (yellow card) 78'	Report	Gomes (yellow card) 29'; Soleri 41'	Stadium: Stadio Ennio Tardini; Referee: Luca Massimi

10 April 2023 32	Cittadella	0–1	Parma	Cittadella
15:00 CEST (UTC+2)	Salvi (yellow card) 56'; Ambrosino (yellow card) 59'; Pavan (yellow card) 90'	Report	Camara 21'; Estévez (yellow card) 36'; Bonny (yellow card) 90+1'	Stadium: Stadio Pier Cesare Tombolato; Referee: Niccolò Baroni

14 April 2023 33	Modena	1–1	Parma	Modena
20:30 CEST (UTC+2)	Diaw 14'	Report	Benedyczak 16'; Del Prato (yellow card) 42'	Stadium: Stadio Alberto Braglia; Referee: Marco Serra

22 April 2023 34	Parma	2–1	Cagliari	Parma
14:00 CEST (UTC+2)	Cobbaut (yellow card) 10'; Ansaldi (yellow card) 51'; Benedyczak (yellow card) 53'; Vázquez 62' (pen.); Man 77'; Mihăilă (yellow card) 84' (penalty missed) 90+2'; Coulibaly (yellow card) 90+4'	Report	Lapadula 32' (yellow card) 49'; Azzi (yellow card) 61'; Luvumbo (yellow card) 78'; Zappa (yellow card) 90+3'	Stadium: Stadio Ennio Tardini; Referee: Matteo Gariglio

1 May 2023 35	Benevento	2–2	Parma	Benevento
15:00 CEST (UTC+2)	Ciano (yellow card) 28' (goal) 48'; Glik (yellow card) 71'; Acampora 86'; Viviani (yellow card) 89'	Report	Benedyczak 7'; Man 42'; Cobbaut (red card) 83'; Camara (yellow card) 90+1'	Stadium: Stadio Ciro Vigorito; Referee: Ermanno Feliciani

7 May 2023 36	Parma	2–0	Brescia	Parma
16:15 CEST (UTC+2)	Benedyczak 11', 17'; Circati (yellow card) 54'; Vázquez (yellow card) 69'; Balogh (yellow card) 85'	Report	Jallow (yellow card) 53'; Niemeijer (yellow card) 62'; Mangraviti (yellow card) 82'	Stadium: Stadio Ennio Tardini; Referee: Antonio Giua

13 May 2023 37	SPAL	0–1	Parma	Ferrara
14:00 CEST (UTC+2)	Dalle Mura (yellow card) 2'	Report	Vázquez 75' (pen.); Camara (yellow card) 90'; Zanimacchia (yellow card) 90+6'	Stadium: Stadio Paolo Mazza; Referee: Massimiliano Irrati

19 May 2023 38	Parma	2–1	Venezia	Parma
20:30 CEST (UTC+2)	Vázquez 12' (pen.); Bernabé (yellow card) 25'; Camara 76' (yellow card) 89'	Report	Ceppitelli (yellow card) 40'; Pohjanpalo 44'	Stadium: Stadio Ennio Tardini; Referee: Juan Luca Sacchi

=== Serie B Playoffs ===
30 May 2023 Semifinal 1st leg	Cagliari	3–2	Parma	Cagliari
20:30 CEST (UTC+2)	Luvumbo 68', 89'; Lapadula 85' (pen.)	Report	Benedyczak 10'; Sohm 26'; Estévez (yellow card) 29'; Vázquez (yellow card) 62'; Chichizola (yellow card) 65'; Mihăilă (yellow card) 72'; Man (yellow card) 90+1'	Stadium: Unipol Domus; Referee: A.Colombo

3 June 2023 Semifinal 2nd leg	Parma	0–0 (2–3 agg.)	Cagliari	Parma
20:30 CEST (UTC+2)	Osorio (yellow card) 61'; Zanimacchia (yellow card) 64'	Report	Dossena (yellow card) 41'; Radunović (yellow card) 90'; Goldaniga (yellow card) 90+1'; Viola (yellow card) 90+5'	Stadium: Stadio Ennio Tardini; Referee: Daniele Orsato

=== Coppa Italia ===
7 August 2022 Round of 64	Salernitana	0–2	Parma	Salerno
20:00 CEST (UTC+2)	Fazio (yellow card) 76'	Report	Camara 59'; Mihăilă 74'; Zagaritis (yellow card) 90+2'	Stadium: Stadio Arechi; Attendance: 10,205; Referee: Ivano Pezzuto

19 October 2022 Round of 32	Parma	1–0	Bari	Parma
18:00 CEST (UTC+2)	Benedyczak 29'	Report	Botta (yellow card) 42'; Vicari (yellow card) 66'	Stadium: Stadio Ennio Tardini; Attendance: 4,690; Referee: Marco Serra

10 January 2023 Round of 16	Internazionale	2–1 (a.e.t.)	Parma	Milan
21:00 CET (UTC+1)	Martínez 88'; Dimarco (yellow card) 105'; Acerbi 110'	Report	Jurić 38'; Bernabé (yellow card) 45+1'; Camara (yellow card) 79'	Stadium: San Siro; Attendance: 40,032; Referee: Alessandro Prontera

== Squad statistics ==
As of match played 3 June 2023

=== Appearances and goals ===
No.	Pos	Nat	Player	Total		Serie B		Serie B Playoffs		Coppa Italia	
No.	Pos	Nat	Player	Apps	Goals	Apps	Goals	Apps	Goals	Apps	Goals
1	GK	(Italy) ITA	Gianluigi Buffon	19	0	17	0	1	0	1	0
3	DF	(Venezuela) VEN	Yordan Osorio	31	0	27+1	0	2	0	1	0
4	DF	(Hungary) HUN	Botond Balogh	17	0	10+5	0	0	0	2	0
7	FW	(Poland) POL	Adrian Benedyczak	36	10	18+13	8	2	1	2+1	1
8	MF	(Argentina) ARG	Nahuel Estévez	41	0	30+6	0	2	0	2+1	0
9	FW	(Republic of the Congo) CGO	Gabriel Charpentier	9	0	2+6	0	0	0	1	0
10	MF	(Argentina) ARG	Franco Vázquez	40	12	36	12	2	0	1+1	0
13	FW	(France) FRA	Ange-Yoan Bonny	28	1	3+21	1	0+2	0	1+1	0
14	DF	(Argentina) ARG	Cristian Ansaldi	22	1	13+8	1	0	0	1	0
15	MF	(Italy) ITA	Enrico Del Prato	39	3	33+1	3	2	0	3	0
16	MF	(Spain) ESP	Adrián Bernabé	33	1	25+4	1	2	0	2	0
17	FW	(Italy) ITA	Luca Zanimacchia	18	1	12+4	1	1+1	0	0	0
19	MF	(Switzerland) SUI	Simon Sohm	32	1	16+11	0	2	1	2+1	0
20	MF	(France) FRA	Antoine Hainaut	15	0	3+10	0	0	0	0+2	0
22	GK	(Argentina) ARG	Leandro Chichizola	20	0	16+1	0	1+1	0	1	0
23	MF	(Ivory Coast) CIV	Drissa Camara	25	5	5+17	4	0+1	0	0+2	1
24	MF	(Croatia) CRO	Stanko Jurić	34	1	22+8	0	0+1	0	2+1	1
25	DF	(Belgium) BEL	Elias Cobbaut	11	0	6+3	0	1+1	0	0	0
26	DF	(France) FRA	Woyo Coulibaly	22	1	8+10	1	2	0	2	0
28	FW	(Romania) ROU	Valentin Mihăilă	19	3	7+8	2	0+2	0	1+1	1
30	DF	(Argentina) ARG	Lautaro Valenti	26	1	24	1	0	0	2	0
39	DF	(Australia) AUS	Alessandro Circati	17	0	10+4	0	1	0	1+1	0
40	GK	(Italy) ITA	Edoardo Corvi	6	0	5	0	0	0	1	0
45	FW	(Italy) ITA	Roberto Inglese	26	4	16+8	4	0	0	1+1	0
47	DF	(Greece) GRE	Vasilios Zagaritis	14	0	3+10	0	0	0	0+1	0
84	FW	(Latvia) LAT	Dario Šits	3	0	0+2	0	0	0	0+1	0
98	FW	(Romania) ROU	Dennis Man	32	6	20+8	6	1+1	0	2	0
Players away on loan:
11	FW	(Italy) ITA	Gennaro Tutino	17	2	8+9	2	0	0	0	0
Players who appeared for Parma but left during the season:
5	DF	(Italy) ITA	Simone Romagnoli	7	0	6	0	0	0	1	0
17	DF	(Netherlands) NED	Jayden Oosterwolde	19	1	17+1	1	0	0	0+1	0

=== Goal scorers ===
Place	Position	Nation	Number	Name	Serie B	Serie B Playoffs	Coppa Italia	Total
1	MF	(Argentina)	10	Franco Vázquez	12	0	0	12
2	FW	(Poland)	7	Adrian Benedyczak	8	1	1	10
3	FW	(Romania)	98	Dennis Man	6	0	0	6
4	MF	(Ivory Coast)	23	Drissa Camara	4	0	1	5
5	FW	(Italy)	45	Roberto Inglese	4	0	0	4
6	DF	(Italy)	15	Enrico Del Prato	3	0	0	3
6	MF	(Romania)	28	Valentin Mihăilă	2	0	1	3
8	FW	(Italy)	11	Gennaro Tutino	2	0	0	2
9	DF	(Netherlands)	17	Jayden Oosterwolde	1	0	0	1
9	DF	(Argentina)	30	Lautaro Valenti	1	0	0	1
9	FW	(France)	13	Ange-Yoan Bonny	1	0	0	1
9	MF	(Spain)	16	Adrián Bernabé	1	0	0	1
9	DF	(Argentina)	14	Cristian Ansaldi	1	0	0	1
9	FW	(Italy)	17	Luca Zanimacchia	1	0	0	1
9	DF	(France)	26	Woyo Coulibaly	1	0	0	1
9	MF	(Switzerland)	19	Simon Sohm	1	0	0	1
9	MF	(Croatia)	24	Stanko Jurić	0	0	1	1
TOTALS					48	2	4	54

=== Clean sheets ===
Place	Position	Nation	Number	Name	Serie B	Serie B Playoffs	Coppa Italia	Total
1	GK	(Argentina)	22	Leandro Chichizola	7	1	1	9
2	GK	(Italy)	1	Gianluigi Buffon	4	0	0	4
3	GK	(Italy)	40	Edoardo Corvi	2	0	1	3
TOTALS					13	1	2	16

=== Disciplinary record ===
Number	Nation	Position	Name	Serie B		Serie B Playoffs		Coppa Italia		Total	
Number	Nation	Position	Name	Yellow card	Red card	Yellow card	Red card	Yellow card	Red card	Yellow card	Red card
3	(Venezuela)	DF	Yordan Osorio	3	0	1	0	0	0	4	0
4	(Hungary)	DF	Botond Balogh	4	0	0	0	0	0	4	0
7	(Poland)	FW	Adrian Benedyczak	2	0	0	0	0	0	2	0
8	(Argentina)	MF	Nahuel Estévez	7	1	1	0	0	0	8	1
10	(Argentina)	MF	Franco Vázquez	7	0	1	0	0	0	8	0
13	(France)	FW	Ange-Yoan Bonny	4	0	0	0	0	0	4	0
14	(Argentina)	DF	Cristian Ansaldi	3	0	0	0	0	0	3	0
15	(Italy)	DF	Enrico Del Prato	6	0	0	0	0	0	6	0
16	(Spain)	MF	Adrián Bernabé	6	0	0	0	1	0	7	0
17	(Italy)	FW	Luca Zanimacchia	2	0	1	0	0	0	3	0
19	(Switzerland)	MF	Simon Sohm	5	0	0	0	0	0	5	0
20	(France)	MF	Antoine Hainaut	4	1	0	0	0	0	4	1
22	(Argentina)	GK	Leandro Chichizola	2	0	1	0	0	0	3	0
23	(Ivory Coast)	MF	Drissa Camara	5	1	0	0	1	0	6	1
24	(Croatia)	MF	Stanko Jurić	7	0	0	0	0	0	7	0
25	(Belgium)	DF	Elias Cobbaut	1	1	0	0	0	0	1	1
26	(France)	DF	Woyo Coulibaly	6	0	0	0	0	0	6	0
28	(Romania)	MF	Valentin Mihăilă	2	0	1	0	0	0	3	0
30	(Argentina)	DF	Lautaro Valenti	6	1	0	0	0	0	6	1
39	(Australia)	DF	Alessandro Circati	2	1	0	0	0	0	2	1
45	(Italy)	FW	Roberto Inglese	1	0	0	0	0	0	1	0
47	(Greece)	DF	Vasilios Zagaritis	3	0	0	0	1	0	4	0
98	(Romania)	FW	Dennis Man	1	0	1	0	0	0	2	0
Players away on loan:
11	(Italy)	FW	Gennaro Tutino	1	0	0	0	0	0	1	0
Players who left Parma during the season:
17	(Netherlands)	DF	Jayden Oosterwolde	6	1	0	0	0	0	6	1
Total				96	7	7	0	3	0	106	7
