= Botond Balogh =

Hungarian footballer (born 2002)

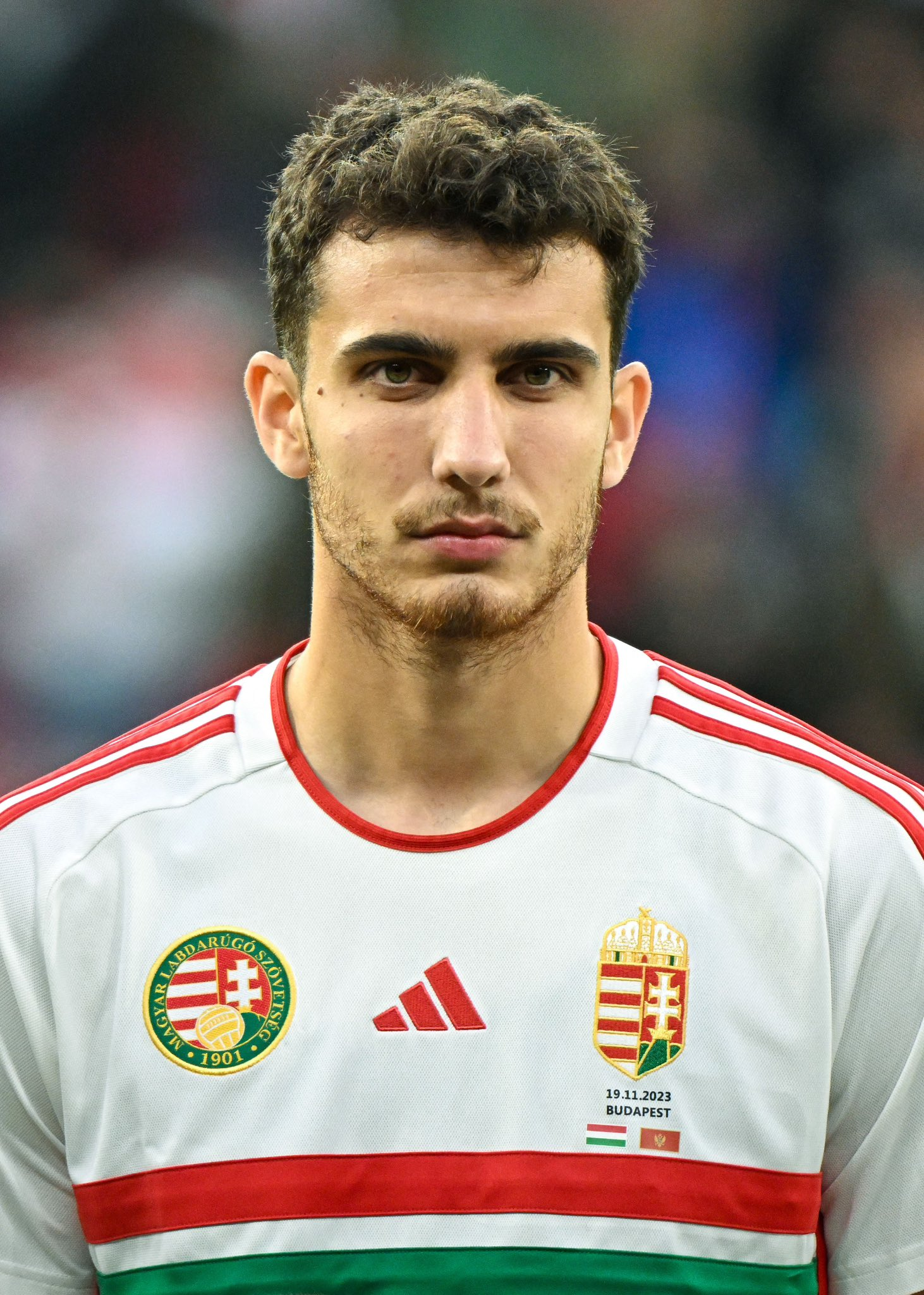
- Balogh with Hungary in 2023

Personal information
- Full name: Botond Balogh
- Date of birth: 6 June 2002 (age 24)
- Place of birth: Sopron, Hungary
- Height: 1.89 m (6 ft 2 in)
- Position: Centre-back

Team information
- Current team: Westerlo
- Number: 40

Youth career
- 2012-2015: Sopron SC
- 2015–2019: MTK Budapest
- 2019–2020: Parma

Senior career*
Years	Team	Apps	(Gls)
2020–	Parma	68	(0)
2025–	→ Kocaelispor (loan)	21	(0)

International career^{‡}
2018	Hungary U16	8	(0)
2018–2019	Hungary U17	10	(0)
2020–2023	Hungary U21	12	(1)
2021–	Hungary	8	(0)
- * Club domestic league appearances and goals as of 10 June 2026 ‡ National team caps and goals as of 21:25, 6 June 2025 (UTC)

Botond Balogh (born 6 June 2002) is a Hungarian professional footballer who plays as a centre-back for Belgian Pro League club Westerlo and the Hungary national team.

== Club career ==
=== Parma ===
==== 2020–21 season ====
Balogh made his professional debut in the 2020–21 Coppa Italia on 28 October 2020, starting the whole game against Pescara in a 3–1 victory. On 31 October 2020, he made his debut in 2020–21 Serie A against Inter Milan. In the season, he made two more appearances against SS Lazio on 10 January 2021, and UC Sampdoria on 22 May 2021.

==== 2021–22 season ====
In the 2021–22 Serie B season, he made only four appearances. He made his first appearance against Frosinone Calcio on 20 August 2021.

==== 2022–23 season ====
In the 2022–23 Serie B season, he made 15 appearances. He played hist first match in the season against Ternana Calcio on 10 September 2022.

==== 2023–24 season ====
On 12 November 2023, he was interviewed by Parma FC media and he said that the club showed their strength (in Italian "Nel secondo tempo abbiamo fatto vedere la nostra forza") against Lecco. He made his first appearance against AS Cittadella in the 2023–24 Serie B season. In 2024 he is promoted to Serie A with his team. On 26 April 2024, he renewed his contract until 30 June 2027.

==== 2024–25 season ====
He made his first appearance in the 2024–25 Serie A season in a 1–1 draw against ACF Fiorentina on 17 August 2024. On game week 2, he was part of the team beating AC Milan 2–1 on 24 August 2024. On 31 August 2024, he was substituted in the 73rd minute against SSC Napoli. The score was 1–0 for Parma when Balogh was substituted for Yordan Osorio. The match ended with a 2–1 defeat for Parma.

On 30 October 2024, he gave an assist to Enrico Del Prato in a 2–2 draw against Juventus FC in the 2024–25 season. On 12 January 2025, he got injured in a 1–0 defeat against Genoa CFC at the Stadio Luigi Ferraris on the 20th match day of the 2024–25 Serie A season. He was substituted for Antoine Hainaut in the 60th minute. In the 65th minute, Morten Frendrup scored the only goal of the match.

==== 2025–26 season: Loan to Kocaelispor ====
After remaining on the bench in the first three games of the 2025–26 Parma season, on 8 September 2025, Balogh was loaned to Kocaelispor in Turkey.

== International career ==
Balogh was part of the Hungarian U-17 team at the 2019 UEFA European Under-17 Championship and 2019 FIFA U-17 World Cup.

Balogh debuted for the Hungarian senior squad on 12 November 2021, in a World Cup qualification against San Marino.

On 14 May 2024, he was named in Hungary's squad for UEFA Euro 2024. Due to injury he was an unused substitute in all three of the team's matches as they finished third in Group A and were eliminated.

On 11 October 2024, he was removed from the squad against the Netherlands in the 2024–25 UEFA Nations League A match due to injury.

== Career statistics ==
=== Club ===
As of match played 24 January 2026

Appearances and goals by club, season and competition
Club	Season	League			Cup		Total	
Club	Season	Division	Apps	Goals	Apps	Goals	Apps	Goals
Parma	2019–20	Serie A	0	0	0	0	0	0
Parma	2020–21	Serie A	3	0	1	0	4	0
Parma	2021–22	Serie B	4	0	1	0	5	0
Parma	2022–23	Serie B	15	0	2	0	17	0
Parma	2023–24	Serie B	17	0	0	0	17	0
Parma	2024–25	Serie A	29	0	1	0	30	0
Parma	Total		68	0	5	0	73	0
Kocaelispor (loan)	2025–26	Süper Lig	14	0	2	0	16	0
Career total			82	0	7	0	89	0

=== International ===
As of match played 6 June 2025.

Appearances and goals by national team and year
National team	Year	Apps	Goals
Hungary	2021	1	0
Hungary	2023	1	0
Hungary	2024	5	0
Hungary	2025	1	0
Total		8	0

== Honours ==
Parma

- Serie B: 2023–24
