= Ange-Yoan Bonny =

Ivorian footballer (born 2003)

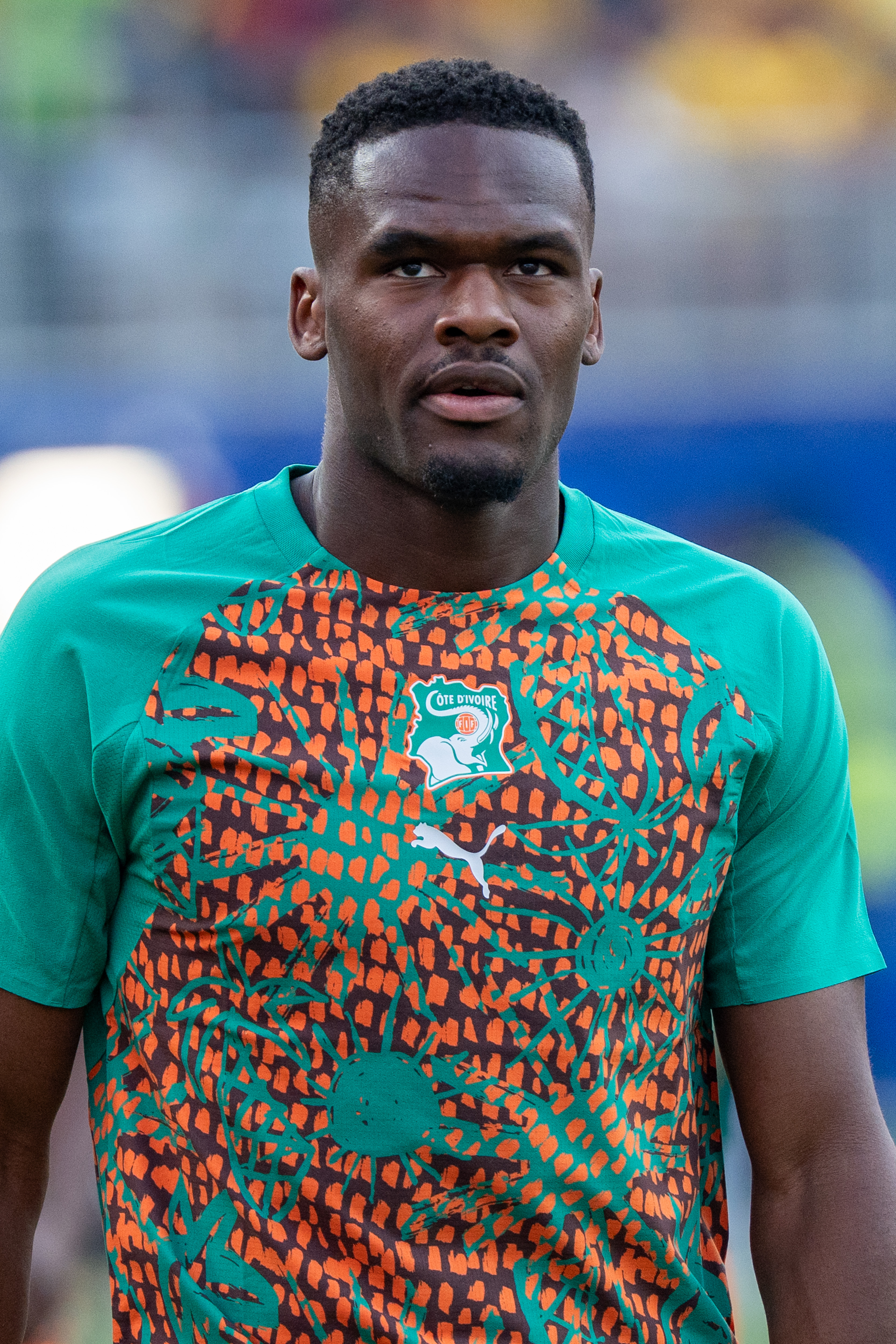
- Bonny with the Ivory Coast in 2026

Personal information
- Date of birth: 25 October 2003 (age 23)
- Place of birth: Aubervilliers, France
- Height: 1.89 m (6 ft 2 in)
- Position: Forward

Team information
- Current team: Inter Milan
- Number: 14

Youth career
- 2010–2011: La Rochelle Villeneuve
- 2011–2013: Périgny
- 2013–2018: Chambray
- 2018–2019: Tours
- 2019–2020: Châteauroux

Senior career*
Years	Team	Apps	(Gls)
2020–2021	Châteauroux II	5	(0)
2020–2021	Châteauroux	5	(1)
2021–2025	Parma	111	(12)
2025–	Inter Milan	43	(7)

International career^{‡}
2021–2022	France U19	7	(5)
2022–2024	France U20	10	(1)
2024	France U21	2	(0)
2026–	Ivory Coast	5	(0)
- * Club domestic league appearances and goals as of 8 November 2026 ‡ National team caps and goals as of 30 June 2026

Ange-Yoan Laure Bonny (born 25 October 2003) is a professional footballer who plays as a forward for Serie A club Inter Milan. Born in France, he represents the Ivory Coast national team.

== Club career ==
=== Chateauroux ===
Bonny left the youth team of Tours in 2019 and joined the youth academy of Châteauroux. After progressing through the youth ranks, he joined the club's first team ahead of the 2020–21 season. On 31 October 2020, he made his professional debut in a Ligue 2 match against Nancy, coming on as a substitute for Léo Leroy. Aged 17 at the time, Bonny played approximately 17 minutes as Châteauroux lost 2–1. He subsequently made an appearance against Pau on 7 November, playing for 36 minutes.

Bonny returned to league action as a substitute against Grenoble on 3 April 2021 and was also given playing time in a match against USL Dunkerque on 10 April. On 20 April, he came on as a substitute against Rodez AF and scored his first professional goal. His equaliser helped Châteauroux secure a 1–1 draw. Bonny made a total of five appearances and scored one goal in Ligue 2 during the 2020–21 season. In the summer of 2021, he left Châteauroux to join Italian club Parma.

=== Parma ===
On 31 August 2021, Bonny left Châteauroux and signed a contract with Parma of Serie B. Aged 17 at the time, he moved to Italy to begin a new challenge. On 2 October of the same year, he made his first-team debut for Parma in a match against S.P.A.L.. He made 13 appearances in Serie B during his first season.

On 12 December 2022, Bonny scored his first league goal for Parma with a stoppage-time strike in a match against Brescia. He subsequently earned more playing opportunities and also scored in a Coppa Italia match against Fiorentina on 6 December 2023.

After scoring against Südtirol on 5 November 2023, he found the net again in a match against Ternana on 2 March 2024. On 1 May 2024, he scored the opening goal in an away match against Bari, helping Parma earn a 1–1 draw. The result confirmed Parma's Serie B title and promotion to Serie A.

On 17 August 2024, Bonny made his Serie A debut in a match against Fiorentina. He assisted Dennis Man's goal in the 1–1 draw and was named Man of the Match. On 31 August of the same year, Bonny scored his first Serie A goal from the penalty spot in a league match against Napoli, although Parma lost 2–1.

On 5 July 2025, Bonny left Parma and completed a permanent transfer to Inter Milan.

=== Inter Milan ===
On 5 July 2025, Bonny moved to Serie A club Inter Milan. Consequently, he reunited with his former Parma coach, Cristian Chivu. A month later, on 25 August, he scored on his league debut for Inter in a 5–0 win against Torino.

On 4 October, Bonny scored and provided three assists in a 4–1 win over Cremonese.

On 23 January 2026, Bonny came on as a substitute in the 86th minute of a Serie A match against Pisa and scored in the 86th minute. Inter Milan won the match 6–2, with his goal contributing to the victory.

On 4 February, he started in the Coppa Italia quarter-final against Torino and scored the opening goal in the 35th minute. Inter Milan won 2–1 to advance to the semi-finals.

On 28 February, he started in a Serie A match against Genoa, playing for 76 minutes as Inter Milan secured a 2–0 victory. On 8 March, he also started and played the full 90 minutes in the Milan derby against AC Milan.

On 3 May, Bonny came on as a substitute in a match against Parma, which Inter Milan won 2–0 to secure the 2025–26 Serie A title. The victory marked the club's 21st league title.

== International career ==
Bonny is a youth international for France, having played up to the France U21s.

He was one of the players who were preliminary called up with the Ivory Coast national team by head coach Emerse Faé, for the friendly match against South Korea on 28 March 2026.

On 8 May 2026, Bonny's request to switch allegiance to Ivory Coast was approved by FIFA. A week later, on 15 May, he was named in the 26-man squad for the 2026 FIFA World Cup. Bonny made his debut on 4 June 2026, coming on as a 68th‑minute substitute in a 2–1 friendly win over France ahead of the World Cup.

== Personal life ==
Born in France, Bonny is of Ivorian descent.

== Career statistics ==
=== Club ===
As of match played 13 October 2026

Appearances and goals by club, season and competition
Club	Season	League			National cup (Note: Includes Coppa Italia)		Europe		Other		Total	
Club	Season	Division	Apps	Goals	Apps	Goals	Apps	Goals	Apps	Goals	Apps	Goals
Châteauroux II	2020–21	Championnat National	5	0	—		—		—		5	0
Châteauroux	2020–21	Ligue 2	5	1	0	0	—		—		5	1
Parma	2021–22	Serie B	13	0	0	0	—		—		13	0
Parma	2022–23	Serie B	26	1	2	0	—		—		28	1
Parma	2023–24	Serie B	35	5	3	3	—		—		38	8
Parma	2024–25	Serie A	37	6	1	0	—		—		38	6
Parma	Total		111	12	6	3	—		—		117	15
Inter Milan	2025–26	Serie A	33	5	4	2	10 (Note: Appearances in UEFA Champions League)	0	1 (Note: Appearance in Supercoppa Italiana)	0	48	7
Inter Milan	2026–27	Serie A	5	1	0	0	2	1	0	0	7	2
Inter Milan	Total		38	6	4	2	12	1	1	0	55	9
Career total			159	19	10	5	12	1	1	0	182	25

=== International ===
As of match played 30 June 2026

Appearances and goals by national team and year
National team	Year	Apps	Goals
Ivory Coast	2026	5	0
Total		5	0

== Honours ==
Parma

- Serie B: 2023–24

Inter Milan

- Serie A: 2025–26
- Coppa Italia: 2025–26

Individual

- Serie A Rising Star of the Month: October 2025
