= Lautaro Valenti =

Argentine footballer (born 1999)

Personal information
- Full name: Lautaro Rodrigo Valenti
- Date of birth: 14 January 1999 (age 27)
- Place of birth: Rosario, Argentina
- Height: 1.88 m (6 ft 2 in)
- Position: Centre-back

Team information
- Current team: Parma
- Number: 5

Youth career
- Lanús

Senior career*
| Years | Team | Apps | (Gls) |
| 2018–2021 | Lanús | 22 | (3) |
| 2020–2021 | → Parma (loan) | 11 | (0) |
| 2021– | Parma | 76 | (2) |

International career
| 2018 | Argentina U19 | | |
- * Club domestic league appearances and goals as of 25 May 2026

Lautaro Rodrigo Valenti (born 14 January 1999) is an Argentine professional footballer who plays as a centre-back for Serie A club Parma.

== Club career ==
Valenti was produced by the academy of Primera División side Lanús. He was an unused substitute on three occasions in the 2018–19 campaign for fixtures with Atlético Tucumán, Banfield and Godoy Cruz. His professional debut arrived at the conclusion of the aforementioned season in the Copa de la Superliga, with Luis Zubeldía selecting Valenti to start and finish a round of sixteen match against Vélez Sarsfield. On 27 July 2019, Valenti scored on his Primera División bow as he netted in a 1–1 draw with Gimnasia y Esgrima. In total, Valenti made twenty-eight appearances and scored three goals in his first full season with Lanús.

On 26 September 2020, Italian side Parma announced the loan arrival of Valenti, with an obligation to buy in June 2021, as the centre-back penned a four-year contract. He made his debut in a Coppa Italia third round victory over Pescara on 28 October, after replacing Riccardo Gagliolo off the bench with eighteen minutes remaining. His Serie A bow arrived on 22 December during a defeat to bottom-of-the-table Crotone. In 2024, he was promoted to Serie A with his team.

== International career ==
In July 2017, Valenti was called up to train with the Argentina U20s. In the succeeding year, Valenti represented the U19s at the South American Games in Cochabamba, Bolivia.

== Career statistics ==
As of match played 25 May 2025.

Appearances and goals by club, season and competition
| Club | Season | League | | | Cup | | League Cup | | Continental | | Other | | Total | |
| Club | Season | Division | Apps | Goals | Apps | Goals | Apps | Goals | Apps | Goals | Apps | Goals | Apps | Goals |
|---|---|---|---|---|---|---|---|---|---|---|---|---|---|---|
| Lanús | 2018–19 | Primera División | 0 | 0 | 0 | 0 | 1 | 0 | 0 | 0 | 0 | 0 | 1 | 0 |
| Lanús | 2019–20 | Primera División | 22 | 3 | 4 | 0 | 1 | 0 | 1 (Note: Appearance(s) in the Copa Sudamericana) | 0 | 0 | 0 | 28 | 3 |
| Lanús | 2020–21 | Primera División | 0 | 0 | 0 | 0 | — | | — | | 0 | 0 | 0 | 0 |
| Lanús | Total | | 22 | 3 | 4 | 0 | 2 | 0 | 1 | 0 | 0 | 0 | 29 | 3 |
| Parma (loan) | 2020–21 | Serie A | 11 | 0 | 1 | 0 | — | | — | | — | | 12 | 0 |
| Parma | 2021–22 | Serie B | 3 | 0 | 1 | 0 | — | | — | | — | | 4 | 0 |
| Parma | 2022–23 | Serie B | 24 | 1 | 2 | 0 | — | | — | | — | | 26 | 1 |
| Parma | 2023–24 | Serie B | 2 | 0 | 0 | 0 | — | | — | | — | | 2 | 0 |
| Parma | 2024–25 | Serie A | 20 | 1 | 0 | 0 | — | | — | | — | | 20 | 1 |
| Parma | Total | | 60 | 2 | 4 | 0 | 0 | 0 | 0 | 0 | 0 | 0 | 64 | 2 |
| Career total | | | 82 | 5 | 8 | 0 | 2 | 0 | 1 | 0 | 0 | 0 | 93 | 5 |

== Honours ==
Parma

- Serie B: 2023–24
