= Simon Sohm =

Swiss footballer (born 2001)

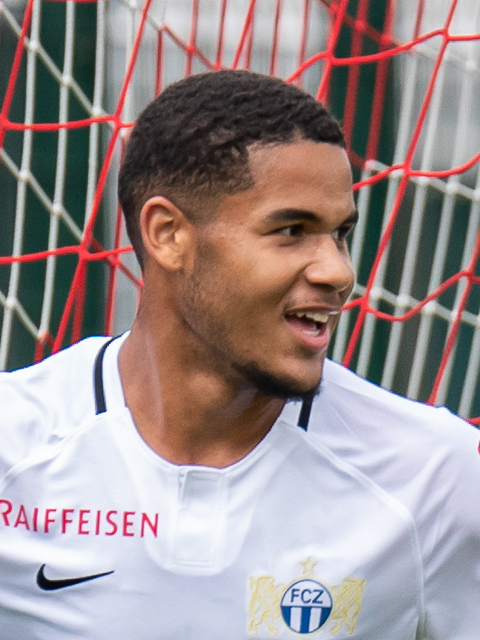
- Sohm with Zürich in 2019

Personal information
- Date of birth: 11 April 2001 (age 25)
- Place of birth: Zürich, Switzerland
- Height: 1.88 m (6 ft 2 in)
- Position: Central midfielder

Team information
- Current team: Venezia (on loan from Fiorentina)
- Number: 19

Youth career
- 2008–2018: Zürich

Senior career*
| Years | Team | Apps | (Gls) |
| 2018–2020 | Zürich | 39 | (1) |
| 2020–2025 | Parma | 142 | (5) |
| 2025– | Fiorentina | 16 | (0) |
| 2026 | → Bologna (loan) | 12 | (0) |
| 2026– | → Venezia (loan) | 0 | (0) |

International career^{‡}
| 2016–2017 | Switzerland U16 | 9 | (1) |
| 2017–2018 | Switzerland U17 | 9 | (1) |
| 2018 | Switzerland U18 | 1 | (0) |
| 2019–2021 | Switzerland U19 | 5 | (1) |
| 2020–2023 | Switzerland U21 | 13 | (0) |
| 2020– | Switzerland | 4 | (0) |
- * Club domestic league appearances and goals as of 11 May 2026 ‡ National team caps and goals as of 18 November 2025

Simon Sohm (born 11 April 2001) is a Swiss professional footballer who plays as a central midfielder for Serie A club Venezia, on loan from Fiorentina, and the Switzerland national team.

== Club career ==
=== Early career ===
Sohm spent his entire youth career with FC Zürich, playing with the U16s and U18s before being promoted to the senior squad.

=== FC Zürich ===
On 2 July 2018, Sohm signed a professional contract with the club. He made his league debut for the club on 28 October 2018 in a 3–2 away loss to St. Gallen. He was subbed on for Adrian Winter in the 91st minute. Sohm maintained a quiet 2018–19 season, making a total of six first-team appearances before breaking into the first team the following year. During his breakout campaign, Sohm emerged as a shrewd distributor and chance creator from the defensive midfield, making over 30 league appearances in a season for the first time in his career.

=== Parma ===
On 4 October 2020, he signed a five-year contract with Italian club Parma. Sohm's introduction to the team was difficult, with COVID-19 restrictions, his relative youth, and the language barrier impacting his ability to settle with his new club. He enjoyed a brief run in the first team early in the 2020–21 season, but fell out of favor as the team's relegation struggle developed. Following Parma's relegation to Serie B, Sohm settled into the first team, making 15 starts and 28 total league appearances during the following year. In January 2024, Sohm signed a new three-year deal with the club, extending his contract through June 2027.

=== Fiorentina ===
On 4 August 2025, Sohm moved to Fiorentina.

==== Loan to Bologna ====
On 22 January 2026, Sohm joined Bologna on loan with an option to buy.

==== Loan to Venezia ====
On 2 August 2026, Sohm joined newly promoted Serie A side Venezia on a season-long loan with an option to buy for €10 million.

== International career ==
Born to a Swiss father and a Nigerian mother, Sohm elected to represent his birth country of Switzerland in international competition. Sohm was included in the Switzerland squad for the 2018 UEFA European Under-17 Championship. He played all three games of the group stage, against England, Italy, and Israel.

He made his national team debut on 7 October 2020 in a friendly against Croatia.

== Personal life ==
Sohm was born in Zürich, Switzerland and is of Nigerian Yoruba descent.

== Career statistics ==
=== Club ===
As of match played 11 May 2026

Appearances and goals by club, season and competition
| Club | Season | League | | | National cup (Note: Includes Swiss Cup, Coppa Italia) | | Europe | | Other | | Total | |
| Club | Season | Division | Apps | Goals | Apps | Goals | Apps | Goals | Apps | Goals | Apps | Goals |
|---|---|---|---|---|---|---|---|---|---|---|---|---|
| Zürich | 2018–19 | Swiss Super League | 6 | 0 | 1 | 0 | 2 (Note: Appearances in UEFA Europa League) | 0 | — | | 9 | 0 |
| Zürich | 2019–20 | Swiss Super League | 31 | 1 | 3 | 0 | — | | — | | 34 | 1 |
| Zürich | 2020–21 | Swiss Super League | 2 | 0 | 2 | 0 | — | | — | | 4 | 0 |
| Zürich | Total | | 39 | 1 | 6 | 0 | 2 | 0 | — | | 47 | 1 |
| Parma | 2020–21 | Serie A | 18 | 1 | 3 | 0 | — | | — | | 21 | 1 |
| Parma | 2021–22 | Serie B | 28 | 0 | 1 | 0 | — | | — | | 29 | 0 |
| Parma | 2022–23 | Serie B | 27 | 0 | 3 | 0 | — | | 2 (Note: Appearances in Serie B promotion play-offs) | 1 | 32 | 1 |
| Parma | 2023–24 | Serie B | 32 | 0 | 3 | 1 | — | | — | | 35 | 1 |
| Parma | 2024–25 | Serie A | 37 | 4 | 1 | 0 | — | | — | | 38 | 4 |
| Parma | Total | | 142 | 5 | 11 | 1 | — | | 2 | 1 | 155 | 7 |
| Fiorentina | 2025–26 | Serie A | 16 | 0 | — | | 5 (Note: Appearances in UEFA Conference League) | 1 | — | | 21 | 1 |
| Bologna (loan) | 2025–26 | Serie A | 12 | 0 | 1 | 0 | 3 | 0 | — | | 16 | 0 |
| Career total | | | 209 | 6 | 18 | 1 | 10 | 1 | 2 | 1 | 239 | 9 |

=== International ===
As of match played 18 November 2025

Appearances and goals by national team and year
| National team | Year | Apps | Goals |
|---|---|---|---|
| Switzerland | 2020 | 1 | 0 |
| Switzerland | 2024 | 1 | 0 |
| Switzerland | 2025 | 2 | 0 |
| Total | | 4 | 0 |

== Honours ==
Parma

- Serie B: 2023–24
