= Vasilios Zagaritis =

Greek footballer (born 2001)

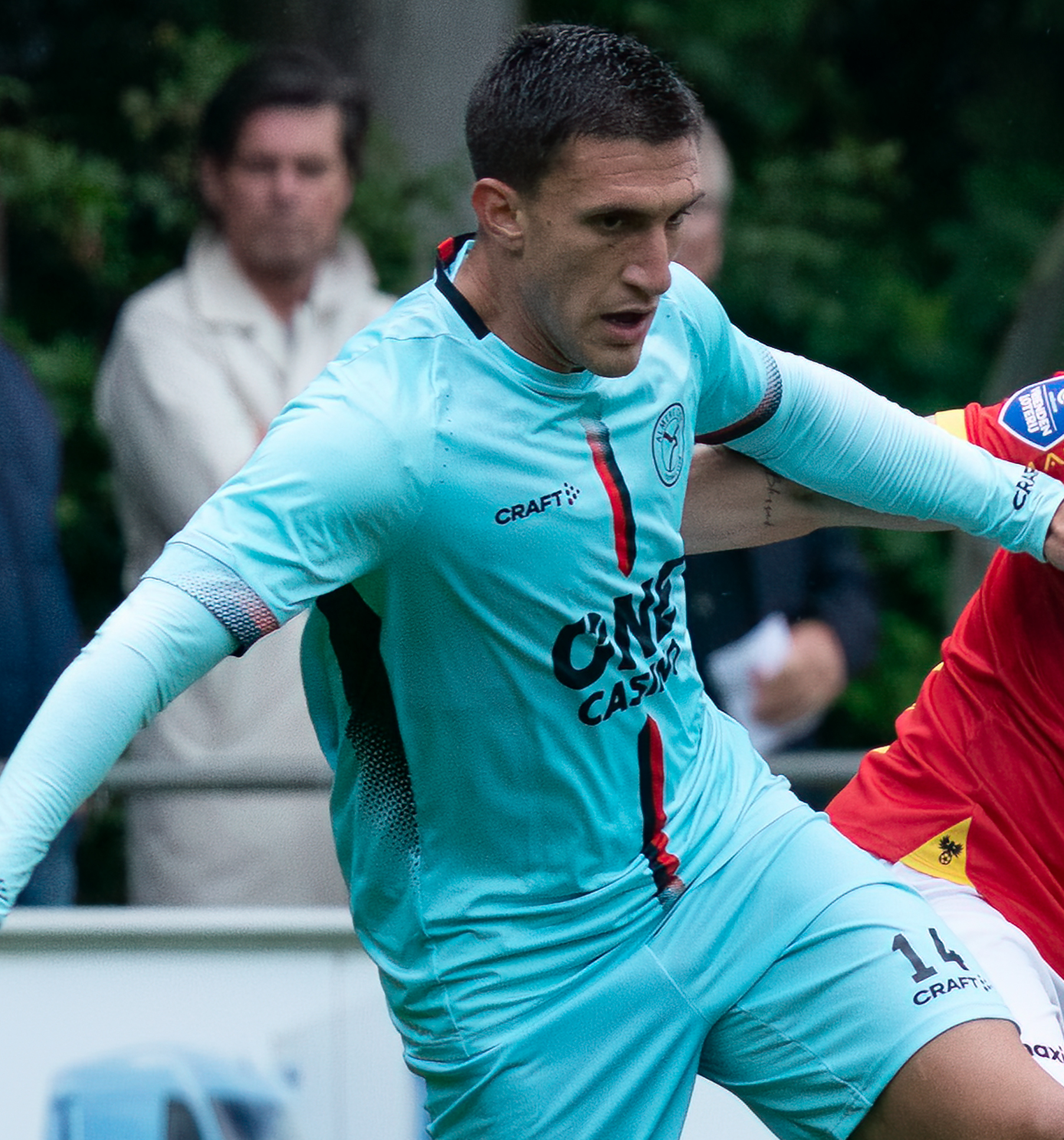
- Zagaritis in 2024

Personal information
- Date of birth: 4 May 2001 (age 25)
- Place of birth: Thebes, Greece
- Height: 1.78 m (5 ft 10 in)
- Position: Left-back

Team information
- Current team: Heerenveen
- Number: 19

Youth career
- 2015–2019: Panathinaikos

Senior career*
Years	Team	Apps	(Gls)
2019–2021	Panathinaikos	19	(0)
2021–2024	Parma	30	(0)
2024–2025	Almere City	33	(0)
2025–	Heerenveen	34	(2)

International career^{‡}
2019	Greece U19	4	(0)
2021–2022	Greece U21	11	(1)
- * Club domestic league appearances and goals as of 19 May 2026 ‡ National team caps and goals as of 11 June 2022

Vasilios Zagaritis (Greek: Βασίλειος Ζαγαρίτης; born 4 May 2001) is a Greek professional footballer who plays as a left-back for Eredivisie club Heerenveen.

== Career ==
=== Panathinaikos ===
In 2015, Zagaritis joined the youth ranks of Panathinaikos from PAS Kithairon Kaparelli.

On 14 January 2019, he signed a professional contract with Panathinaikos lasting for two-and-a-half years. On 1 March 2020, he played his first Super League game for them in a 4–1 win against Volos.

=== Parma ===
On 22 January 2021, Parma announced the signing of Zagaritis on a contract lasting until 30 June 2024. On 17 May 2021, Zagaritis made his debut with Parma, playing as a late substitute in a 1–3 home loss against Sassuolo in the penultimate match of Serie A.

=== Almere City ===
On 7 June 2024, Zagaritis joined Eredivisie club Almere City on a two-year deal with the option for a third.

== Career statistics ==
As of match played 14 May 2025

Club	Season	League			Cup		Continental		Other		Total	
Club	Season	Division	Apps	Goals	Apps	Goals	Apps	Goals	Apps	Goals	Apps	Goals
Panathinaikos	2019–20	Super League Greece	7	0	1	0	—		—		8	0
Panathinaikos	2020–21	Super League Greece	12	0	0	0	—		—		12	0
Panathinaikos	Total		19	0	1	0	0	0	0	0	20	0
Parma	2020–21	Serie A	2	0	0	0	—		—		2	0
Parma	2021–22	Serie B	5	0	0	0	—		—		5	0
Parma	2022–23	Serie B	13	0	1	0	—		—		14	0
Parma	2023–24	Serie B	10	0	2	0	—		—		12	0
Parma	Total		30	0	3	0	0	0	0	0	33	0
Almere City FC	2024–25	Eredivisie	33	0	1	0	—		—		34	0
Career total			82	0	5	0	0	0	0	0	87	0

== Honours ==
Parma

- Serie B: 2023–24

Individual

- Eredivisie Team of the Month: December 2024
