= Leandro Chichizola =

Argentine footballer (born 1990)

Personal information
- Date of birth: 27 March 1990 (age 36)
- Place of birth: San Justo, Argentina
- Height: 1.85 m (6 ft 1 in)
- Position: Goalkeeper

Team information
- Current team: Modena
- Number: 1

Youth career
- San Justino
- River Plate

Senior career*
Years	Team	Apps	(Gls)
2008–2014	River Plate	30	(0)
2014–2017	Spezia	131	(0)
2017–2018	Las Palmas	27	(0)
2018–2021	Getafe	1	(0)
2021	Cartagena	9	(0)
2021–2022	Perugia	38	(0)
2022–2025	Parma	55	(0)
2025	Spezia	11	(0)
2025–	Modena	33	(0)
- * Club domestic league appearances and goals as of 10 May 2026

Leandro Chichizola (locally [tʃitʃiˈsola]; born 27 March 1990) is an Argentine professional footballer who plays as a goalkeeper for Serie B club Modena.

== Career ==
Chichizola started his career with Club Sanjustino de San Justo. In 2008, he signed for River Plate, where he made his professional debut on 13 February 2011 in the first round of the Clausura 2011 tournament in a 0–0 draw against Tigre. He continued to play as River's first choice goalkeeper keeping clean sheets in all of his first four games for the club. On 13 March 2011, he conceded his first goal in a game against Vélez Sársfield after miskicking the ball straight to the opposition striker Santiago Silva.

In the following game against Arsenal de Sarandí he was dropped from the first team after the usual first team goalkeeper Juan Pablo Carrizo returned to fitness.

On 29 June 2017, Chichizola signed for La Liga club UD Las Palmas. He made his debut for the club on 18 August, making several key stops in a 1–0 away loss against Valencia CF.

On 4 July 2018, Chichizola signed a three-year contract with Getafe CF. Mainly a backup option during the most of his spell, he became a third-choice ahead of the 2020–21 season, after the return of Rubén Yáñez; on 5 January 2021, he terminated his link with the club.

On 17 January 2021, Chichizola joined Segunda División side FC Cartagena on a deal until the end of the season.

On 7 July 2021, he signed with Serie B club Perugia.

On 14 July 2022, Chichizola moved to Parma. In 2024, he achieved promotion to Serie A with Parma.

On 9 January 2025, Chichizola returned to Spezia on a contract until 30 June 2025, with a conditional option to extend.

On 27 June 2025, Chichizola signed a two-season contract with Modena.

== Career statistics ==
As of match played 5 May 2024

Appearances and goals by club, season and competition
Club	Season	League			National cup (Note: Includes Copa Argentina, Copa del Rey, Coppa Italia.)		Europe		Other		Total	
Club	Season	Division	Apps	Goals	Apps	Goals	Apps	Goals	Apps	Goals	Apps	Goals
River Plate	2008–09	Argentine Primera División	0	0	—		0	0	—		0	0
River Plate	2009–10	Argentine Primera División	0	0	—		—		—		0	0
River Plate	2010–11	Argentine Primera División	5	0	—		—		0	0	5	0
River Plate	2011–12	Argentine Primera División	18	0	4	0	—		—		22	0
River Plate	2012–13	Argentine Primera División	0	0	1	0	1	0	—		2	0
River Plate	2013–14	Argentine Primera División	7	0	0	0	—		—		7	0
River Plate	Total		30	0	5	0	1	0	0	0	36	0
Spezia	2014–15	Serie B	42	0	1	0	—		1	0	44	0
Spezia	2015–16	Serie B	42	0	5	0	—		3	0	50	0
Spezia	2016–17	Serie B	42	0	4	0	—		1	0	47	0
Spezia	Total		126	0	10	0	—		5	0	141	0
Las Palmas	2017–18	La Liga	27	0	2	0	—		—		29	0
Getafe	2018–19	La Liga	1	0	6	0	—		—		7	0
Getafe	2019–20	La Liga	0	0	2	0	5	0	—		7	0
Getafe	Total		1	0	8	0	5	0	—		14	0
Cartagena	2020–21	Segunda División	9	0	—		—		—		9	0
Perugia	2021–22	Serie B	38	0	2	0	—		1	0	41	0
Parma	2022–23	Serie B	17	0	1	0	—		2	0	20	0
Parma	2023–24	Serie B	37	0	0	0	—		—		37	0
Parma	2024–25	Serie A	1	0	1	0	—		—		2	0
Parma	Total		55	0	2	0	—		2	0	59	0
Spezia	2024–25	Serie B	11	0	—		—		0	0	11	0
Career total			297	0	29	0	6	0	8	0	340	0

== Honours ==
Parma

- Serie B: 2023–24
