= Lucas Finazzi =

Italian Brazilian footballer

Personal information
- Full name: Lucas Martinelli Finazzi
- Date of birth: 18 August 1990 (age 36)
- Place of birth: Cuiabá, Brazil
- Height: 1.79 m (5 ft 10 1/2 in)
- Position: Midfielder

Team information
- Current team: Portogruaro

Youth career
- 2005–2010: Chievo

Senior career*
Years	Team	Apps	(Gls)
2010–2014	Chievo	0	(0)
2010–2012	→ Lumezzane (loan)	35	(2)
2012–2014	→ Brescia (loan)	43	(0)
2014–2015	Grosseto	13	(0)
2015	→ Cremonese (loan)	15	(0)
2015–2016	Melfi	23	(0)
2016–2017	Virtus Francavilla	20	(0)
2017	Gavorrano	13	(0)
2018	Triestina	7	(0)
2019	Cuiabá	0	(0)
2019–2021	Campodarsego	49	(1)
2021–2022	Clodiense	33	(0)
2022–2023	Mestre	27	(2)
2023–	Portogruaro	2	(0)
- * Club domestic league appearances and goals as of 17 September 2023

Lucas Finazzi (born 18 August 1990) is an Italian Brazilian footballer who plays as a midfielder for Italian Serie D club Portogruaro.

== Career ==
Born in Cuiabá, Mato Grosso state, Brazil, Finazzi started his Italian career in A.C. ChievoVerona along with his brother Thiago. Lucas was a member of the reserve from 2007 to 2010 in national "spring" league. Since 2010, L.Finazzi left for Lumezzane in temporary deal along with Roberto Inglese.

On 11 July 2012, Finazzi signed a season-long loan deal with Serie B side Brescia Calcio. The loan deal was renewed on 10 July 2013.

On 28 August 2014 Finazzi was signed by Serie C club Grosseto. on 10 January 2015 he left for fellow third division club Cremonese in temporary deal.
