= Valentin Mihăilă =

Romanian footballer (born 2000)

Personal information
- Date of birth: 2 February 2000 (age 26)
- Place of birth: Târgoviște, Romania
- Height: 1.78 m (5 ft 10 in)
- Position: Winger

Team information
- Current team: Çaykur Rizespor
- Number: 7

Youth career
- 2008–2010: Gaz Metan Finta
- 2010–2012: Astra Ploiești
- 2012–2014: CS Casa Bogdan
- 2014–2017: Universitatea Craiova

Senior career*
Years	Team	Apps	(Gls)
2017–2020	Universitatea Craiova	62	(8)
2020–2025	Parma	97	(13)
2022	→ Atalanta (loan)	5	(0)
2025–	Çaykur Rizespor	28	(5)

International career^{‡}
2017–2018	Romania U18	5	(0)
2018	Romania U19	6	(6)
2019–2020	Romania U21	6	(5)
2021–	Romania	41	(5)
- * Club domestic league appearances and goals as of 3 November 2026 ‡ National team caps and goals as of 5 October 2026

Valentin Mihăilă (Romanian pronunciation: [valenˈtin mihəˈilə]; born 2 February 2000) is a Romanian professional footballer who plays as a winger for Süper Lig club Çaykur Rizespor and the Romania national team.

Mihăilă began his professional career at Universitatea Craiova in 2017, appearing in over 60 Liga I matches before signing with Italian team Parma for €8.5 million three years later. In 2025, he transferred to Turkish club Çaykur Rizespor for a €2 million fee.

After representing Romania at under-18, under-19, and under-21 levels, Mihăilă recorded his full debut in a 3–2 win over North Macedonia in March 2021. He competed for the country in the UEFA Euro 2024, where they won their group and reached the round of 16.

== Club career ==
=== Universitatea Craiova ===
Mihăilă made his senior debut for Universitatea Craiova on 24 October 2017, aged 17, in a 2–0 away victory over Sepsi OSK counting for the Cupa României. He did not appear in any other match during that season, but on 9 August 2018 started in a 3–1 away defeat to RB Leipzig in the UEFA Europa League third qualifying round. His Liga I debut also came against Sepsi OSK, in a 0–1 loss on 29 July 2018.

Mihăilă began to play frequently, and on 19 April 2019 recorded his first league goal—and the only of the match—in an away fixture with Astra Giurgiu, one of his former youth clubs. He amassed 32 matches across all competitions in the 2018–19 campaign, and in December 2019 manager Victor Pițurcă confirmed that Craiova rejected a €5 million bid for him from fellow league team FCSB.

During his third season in Oltenia, Mihăilă totalled nine goals and came close to claiming the national championship; his side however lost the final fixture 1–3 to eventual champions CFR Cluj on 3 August 2020.

=== Parma ===
On 5 October 2020, Italian team Parma announced the signing of Mihăilă on a five-year contract, with the transfer fee being reportedly worth €8.5 million. The sum represented the third-most expensive sale of the Romanian championship at the time, slightly surpassing his former Craiova teammate Alexandru Mitriță on that place. After recovering from athletic pubalgia, Mihăilă made his debut on 3 January 2021 by coming on as a substitute in a 0–3 Serie A loss to Torino.

Mihăilă was a starter for the first time on 21 January 2021, scoring the equaliser in an eventual 1–2 defeat to Lazio in Coppa Italia's round of 16. He registered his first league goal on 7 March, in a 3–3 away draw with Fiorentina in which he also assisted Jasmin Kurtić. The following fixture, his compatriot Dennis Man assisted him to open the scoring in a 2–0 defeat of Roma. Mihăilă ended the league season with three goals from 16 appearances, as the club got relegated to the Serie B.

On 31 January 2022, Mihăilă joined Serie A club Atalanta on a five-month loan with an option to buy. He did not impress during his stint in Bergamo, featuring in only seven matches without scoring. After returning to Parma, Mihăilă converted a free kick in the Serie B opener, a 2–2 draw with Bari on 12 August 2022.

Mihăilă struggled with recurring injuries before regaining his fitness in the 2023–24 season, aiding with 6 goals from 35 appearances in all competitions as Parma won its first-ever Serie B title and reached the top division after a three-year pause. The following campaign, he played 21 Serie A matches before suffering another injury at the start of 2025.

=== Çaykur Rizespor ===
On 18 July 2025, Mihăilă agreed a four-year contract with Turkish side Çaykur Rizespor. The €2 million transfer fee reportedly equalled the club record for the most expensive signing, held by Léonard Kweuke since 2013. Mihăilă made his debut on 10 August, playing 59 minutes in a 0–3 Süper Lig loss to Göztepe.

== International career ==
=== Youth ===
Mihăilă attracted significant media attention after contributing to Romania national under-21 team's victory in a UEFA Euro 2021 qualifier against Finland on 14 November 2019, as he scored a hat-trick and provoked an own goal.

=== Senior ===
In March 2021, Mihăilă was called up for the first time to the Romania squad by head coach Mirel Rădoi for the 2022 FIFA World Cup qualifiers against North Macedonia, Germany, and Armenia. On the 25th that month, he replaced injured Florinel Coman in the first half of the former game and netted in the 3–2 win at the Arena Națională in Bucharest.

On 19 June 2023, Mihăilă came on in the second half of a Euro 2024 qualifier against Switzerland and scored a late double to earn his team a 2–2 draw. He was then meant to join up with the under-21 team for the 2023 European Championship, but was ruled out after suffering an injury in the latter match.

Romania secured their spot in the Euro 2024 by finishing first in their qualifying group, and on 7 June 2024 Mihăilă was selected as part of the final squad. He made three appearances and only started in the 0–2 loss to Belgium on 22 June, as his country won its group before being eliminated by the Netherlands in the round of 16.

== Personal life ==
Mihăilă was born in Târgoviște and raised in Finta, both in Dâmbovița County. He developed an early interest in football with the support of his father, who worked as a firefighter.

== Style of play ==
Mihăilă is primarily deployed as a winger on the left flank, his standout quality being his pace. During Euro 2024, he showcased it by recording one of the fastest speeds of the tournament at 35.8 km/h.

== Career statistics ==
=== Club ===
As of match played 3 November 2026

Appearances and goals by club, season and competition
Club	Season	League			National cup (Note: Includes Cupa României, Coppa Italia, Turkish Cup)		Continental		Other		Total	
Club	Season	Division	Apps	Goals	Apps	Goals	Apps	Goals	Apps	Goals	Apps	Goals
Universitatea Craiova	2017–18	Liga I	0	0	1	0	0	0	—		1	0
Universitatea Craiova	2018–19	Liga I	29	1	2	0	1 (Note: Appearance(s) in UEFA Europa League)	0	0	0	32	1
Universitatea Craiova	2019–20	Liga I	28	7	3	2	1	0	—		32	9
Universitatea Craiova	2020–21	Liga I	5	0	0	0	1	0	—		6	0
Universitatea Craiova	Total		62	8	6	2	3	0	0	0	71	10
Parma	2020–21	Serie A	16	3	1	1	—		—		17	4
Parma	2021–22	Serie B	13	2	0	0	—		—		13	2
Parma	2022–23	Serie B	15	2	2	1	—		2 (Note: Appearances in Serie B promotion play-offs)	0	19	3
Parma	2023–24	Serie B	32	6	3	0	—		—		35	6
Parma	2024–25	Serie A	21	0	1	0	—		—		22	0
Parma	Total		97	13	7	2	—		2	0	106	15
Atalanta (loan)	2021–22	Serie A	5	0	0	0	2	0	—		7	0
Çaykur Rizespor	2025–26	Süper Lig	22	5	4	1	—		—		26	6
Çaykur Rizespor	2026–27	Süper Lig	6	0	0	0	—		—		6	0
Çaykur Rizespor	Total		28	5	4	1	—		—		32	6
Career total			192	26	17	5	5	0	2	0	216	31

=== International ===
As of match played 5 October 2026

Appearances and goals by national team and year
National team	Year	Apps	Goals
Romania	2021	5	1
Romania	2022	5	0
Romania	2023	7	3
Romania	2024	13	1
Romania	2025	3	0
Romania	2026	7	0
Total		40	5

Scores and results list Romania's goal tally first, score column indicates score after each Mihăilă goal

List of international goals scored by Valentin Mihăilă
No.	Date	Venue	Opponent	Score	Result	Competition
1	25 March 2021	Arena Națională, Bucharest, Romania	North Macedonia	2–0	3–2	2022 FIFA World Cup qualification
2	19 June 2023	Swissporarena, Lucerne, Switzerland	Switzerland	1–2	2–2	UEFA Euro 2024 qualifying
3	19 June 2023	Swissporarena, Lucerne, Switzerland	Switzerland	2–2	2–2	UEFA Euro 2024 qualifying
4	12 September 2023	Arena Națională, Bucharest, Romania	Kosovo	2–0	2–0	UEFA Euro 2024 qualifying
5	9 September 2024	Steaua Stadium, Bucharest, Romania	Lithuania	1–0	3–1	2024–25 UEFA Nations League C

== Honours ==
Universitatea Craiova

- Cupa României: 2017–18
- Supercupa României runner-up: 2018

Parma

- Serie B: 2023–24
