= Adrian Benedyczak =

Polish footballer (born 2000)

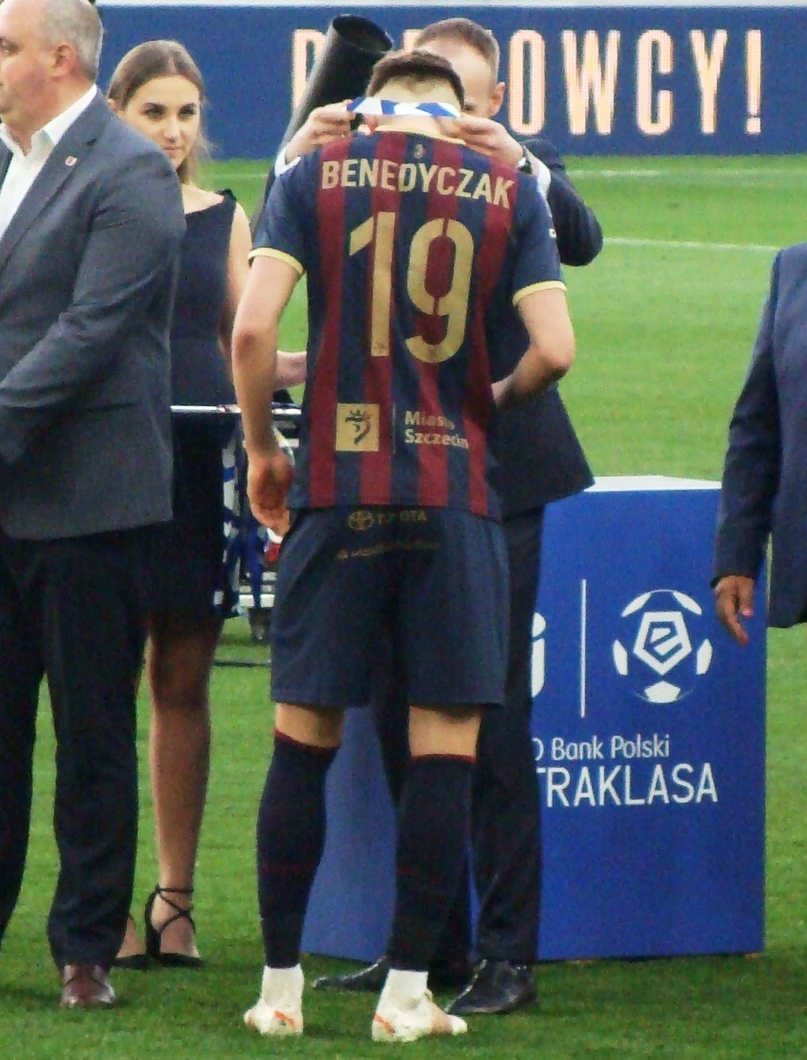
- Benedyczak with Pogoń Szczecin in 2021

Personal information
- Full name: Adrian Dawid Benedyczak
- Date of birth: 24 November 2000 (age 25)
- Place of birth: Kamień Pomorski, Poland
- Height: 1.90 m (6 ft 3 in)
- Position: Forward

Team information
- Current team: Kasımpaşa
- Number: 9

Youth career
- –2013: Gryf Kamień Pomorski
- 2013–2016: Pogoń Szczecin

Senior career*
Years	Team	Apps	(Gls)
2017–2020	Pogoń Szczecin II	33	(14)
2017–2021	Pogoń Szczecin	40	(3)
2019–2020	→ Chrobry Głogów (loan)	19	(5)
2021–2026	Parma	117	(25)
2026	→ Kasımpaşa (loan)	14	(10)
2026–	Kasımpaşa	12	(9)

International career^{‡}
2016	Poland U17	4	(2)
2017–2018	Poland U18	5	(1)
2018	Poland U19	1	(1)
2018–2019	Poland U20	11	(1)
2021–2022	Poland U21	11	(8)
2026–	Poland	2	(1)
- * Club domestic league appearances and goals as of 16:10, 22 November 2026 (UTC) ‡ National team caps and goals as of 17 November 2026

Adrian Dawid Benedyczak (born 24 November 2000) is a Polish professional footballer who plays as a forward for Süper Lig club Kasımpaşa and the Poland national team.

== Youth career ==
Benedyczak started playing football at Gryf Kamień Pomorski before joining Pogoń Szczecin in 2013.

== Club career ==
=== Pogoń Szczecin and Chrobry Głogów ===
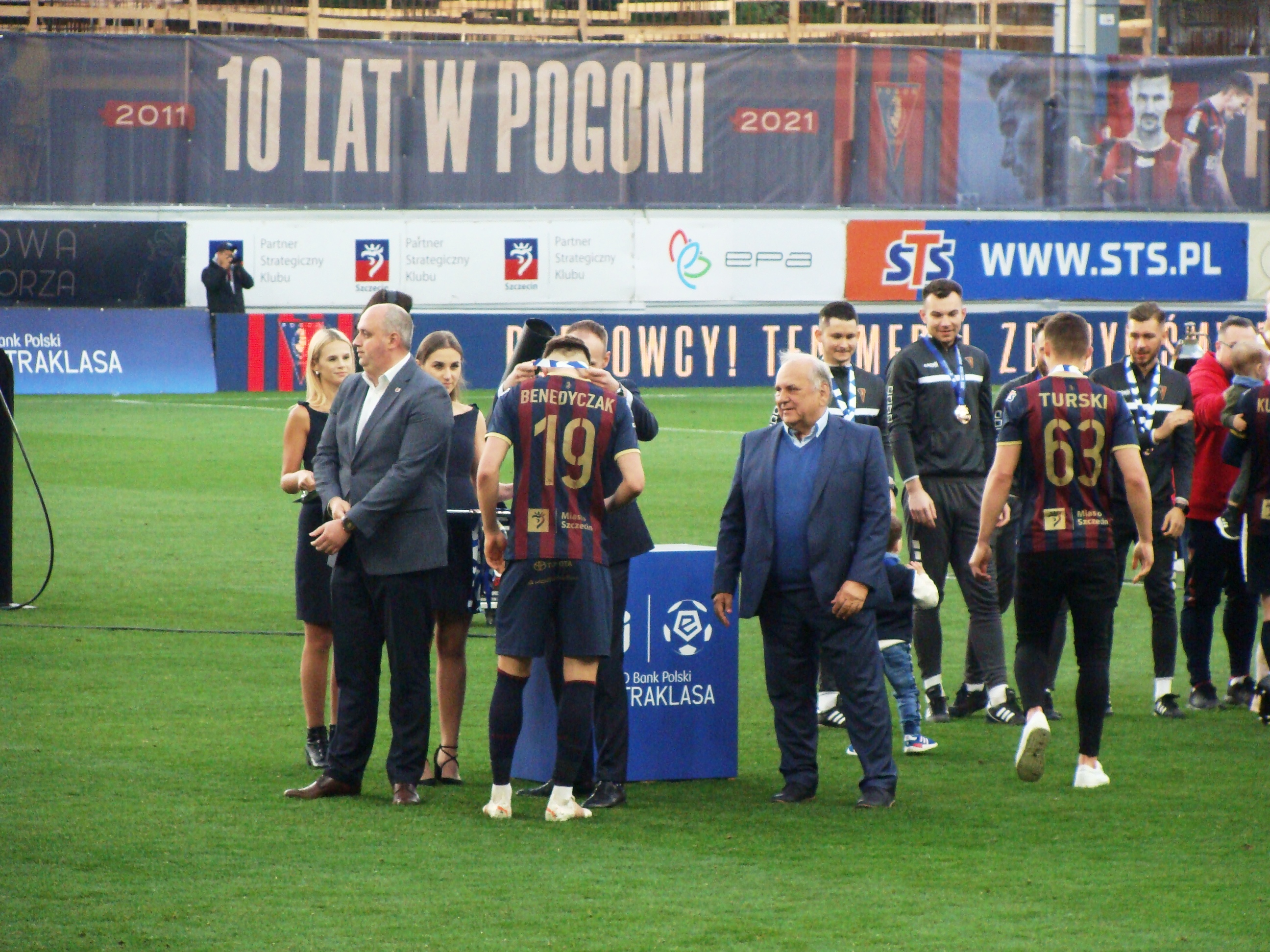
Benedyczak (number 19) with Pogoń Szczecin at the end of 2020–21 Ekstraklasa season, receiving a bronze medal

Benedyczak first played for the reserve team of Pogoń and made it to the first team in 2017. He was loaned out to the I liga side Chrobry Głogów in 2019 for a season and the returned to Pogoń where he made a total of 40 league appearances and scored three goals.

=== Parma ===
On 27 June 2021, Benedyczak joined Serie B side Parma on a four-year deal. He scored ten goals in 31 league appearances during Parma's title-winning 2023–24 season. On 29 May 2024, the club announced Benedyczak had extended his contract until June 2028. In 2024, he won promotion to Serie A with the team. In May 2025, Benedyczak recovered from an ankle injury, which ruled him out for almost four months playing a match.

On 3 February 2026, Benedyczak was loaned to Kasımpaşa in Turkey. He ended the season with ten goals in fourteen appearances and returned to Parma after it had concluded. He made 129 appearances in all competitions for Parma, scoring 29 goals.

=== Kasımpaşa ===
On 28 July 2026, Benedyczak returned to Kasımpaşa on a permanent transfer, signing at the club's Kemerburgaz training ground. The fee was reported to be in the region of €5 million.

== International career ==
=== Youth teams ===
Benedyczak represented Poland at multiple youth levels, ranging from under-17s to under-21s. He was part of the roster for the 2019 FIFA U-20 World Cup, where he appeared in all four games played by the hosts, scoring once in a 5–0 group stage win against Tahiti.

=== Senior team ===
On 31 August 2023, he received his first senior team call-up for the UEFA Euro 2024 qualifying matches against Faroe Islands and Albania on 7 and 10 September 2023, but failed to make an appearance in either of them. He made his first international appearance on 14 November 2026, appearing as a substitute in a 2–1 loss to Romania in the 2026–27 UEFA Nations League. Three days later, he scored his first goal for Poland, opening the score in a 1–1 home draw against Sweden.

== Career statistics ==
As of match played 22 November 2026

Appearances and goals by club, season and competition
Club	Season	League			National cup (Note: Includes Polish Cup, Coppa Italia)		Other		Total	
Club	Season	Division	Apps	Goals	Apps	Goals	Apps	Goals	Apps	Goals
Pogoń Szczecin II	2016–17	III liga, gr. II	2	0	—		—		2	0
Pogoń Szczecin II	2017–18	III liga, gr. II	10	1	—		—		10	1
Pogoń Szczecin II	2018–19	III liga, gr. II	11	6	—		—		11	6
Pogoń Szczecin II	2019–20	III liga, gr. II	6	4	—		—		6	4
Pogoń Szczecin II	2020–21	III liga, gr. II	4	3	—		—		4	3
Pogoń Szczecin II	Total		33	14	—		—		33	14
Pogoń Szczecin	2017–18	Ekstraklasa	3	0	0	0	—		3	0
Pogoń Szczecin	2018–19	Ekstraklasa	12	0	1	0	—		13	0
Pogoń Szczecin	2020–21	Ekstraklasa	25	3	3	0	—		28	3
Pogoń Szczecin	Total		40	3	4	0	—		44	3
Chrobry Głogów (loan)	2019–20	I liga	19	5	1	0	—		20	5
Parma	2021–22	Serie B	31	6	1	0	—		32	6
Parma	2022–23	Serie B	32	8	3	1	2 (Note: Appearances in Serie B promotion play-offs)	1	37	10
Parma	2023–24	Serie B	31	10	3	1	—		34	11
Parma	2024–25	Serie A	9	0	0	0	—		9	0
Parma	2025–26	Serie A	14	1	3	1	—		17	2
Parma	Total		117	25	10	3	2	1	129	29
Kasımpaşa (loan)	2025–26	Süper Lig	14	10	—		—		14	10
Kasımpaşa	2026–27	Süper Lig	12	9	0	0	—		12	9
Kasımpaşa	Kasımpaşa total		26	19	0	0	—		26	19
Career total			235	66	15	3	2	1	252	70

=== International ===
As of match played 17 November 2026

Appearances and goals by national team and year
National team	Year	Apps	Goals
Poland	2026	2	1
Total		2	1

Scores and results list Poland's goal tally first, score column indicates score after each Benedyczak goal.

List of international goals scored by Adrian Benedyczak
No.	Date	Venue	Cap	Opponent	Score	Result	Competition
1	17 November 2026	Wrocław Stadium, Wrocław, Poland	2	Sweden	1–0	1–1	2026–27 UEFA Nations League B

== Honours ==
Parma

- Serie B: 2023–24
