= Elias Cobbaut =

Belgian footballer (born 1997)

Personal information
- Date of birth: 24 November 1997 (age 28)
- Place of birth: Mechelen, Belgium
- Height: 1.88 m (6 ft 2 in)
- Positions: Centre-back; left-back

Team information
- Current team: Sparta Prague
- Number: 33

Senior career*
Years	Team	Apps	(Gls)
2013–2015	Racing Mechelen	1	(0)
2015–2018	Mechelen	46	(1)
2018–2022	Anderlecht	49	(0)
2021–2022	→ Parma (loan)	35	(2)
2022–2024	Parma	11	(0)
2023–2024	→ Mechelen (loan)	30	(2)
2024–	Sparta Prague	11	(1)
2026–	Sparta Prague B	1	(0)

International career^{‡}
2017–2019	Belgium U21	10	(0)
2019	Belgium	1	(0)
- * Club domestic league appearances and goals as of 28 October 2026 ‡ National team caps and goals as of 5 September 2023

Elias Cobbaut (born 24 November 1997) is a Belgian professional footballer who plays as a centre-back or left-back for Czech side Sparta Prague. He also represented the Belgium national team.

== Career ==
On 28 August 2021, Cobbaut joined Italian club Parma on loan with an option to buy. On 4 June 2022, Anderlecht announced that Parma had exercised the option to buy his contract.

On 5 September 2023, Parma sent Cobbaut on a season-long loan with an option to buy to his former club Mechelen. On 2 September 2024, he signed for Czech First League club Sparta Prague permanently.

On 28 October 2026, Cobbaut played a competitive match for Sparta Prague for the first time in 447 days, following a long-term injury. He featured in the first half of Sparta Prague B's 1–1 away draw against FK Králův Dvůr.

In November 2019, Cobbaut was called up for the UEFA Euro 2020 qualifying matches against Russia and Cyprus, respectively the same year on 16 and 19 November. He debuted against the latter opponent.

== Career statistics ==
As of match played 15 March 2025

Appearances and goals by club, season and competition
Club	Season	League			Cup		Continental		Total	
Club	Season	Division	Apps	Goals	Apps	Goals	Apps	Goals	Apps	Goals
Racing Mechelen	2013–14	Belgian Third Division	1	0	—		—		1	0
Racing Mechelen	2014–15	Belgian Second Division	0	0	—		—		0	0
Racing Mechelen	Total		1	0	—		—		1	0
Mechelen	2015–16	Belgian Pro League	0	0	0	0	—		0	0
Mechelen	2016–17	Belgian First Division A	17	0	0	0	—		17	0
Mechelen	2017–18	Belgian First Division A	29	1	2	0	—		31	1
Mechelen	Total		46	1	2	0	—		48	1
Anderlecht	2018–19	Belgian First Division A	12	0	0	0	0	0	12	0
Anderlecht	2019–20	Belgian First Division A	24	0	2	0	—		26	0
Anderlecht	2020–21	Belgian First Division A	13	0	2	0	—		15	0
Anderlecht	Total		49	0	4	0	0	0	53	0
Parma (loan)	2021–22	Serie B	35	2	0	0	—		35	2
Parma	2022–23	Serie B	11	0	0	0	—		11	0
Parma	Total		46	2	0	0	—		46	2
Mechelen (loan)	2023–24	Belgian Pro League	30	2	1	0	—		31	2
Sparta Prague	2024–25	Czech First League	4	1	1	0	2	0	7	1
Career total			176	6	8	0	2	0	186	6
