= Edoardo Corvi =

Italian footballer (born 2001)

Personal information
- Date of birth: 23 March 2001 (age 25)
- Place of birth: Parma, Italy
- Position: Goalkeeper

Team information
- Current team: Parma
- Number: 40

Youth career
- Parma

Senior career*
Years	Team	Apps	(Gls)
2021–	Parma	32	(0)
2021–2022	→ Legnago Salus (loan)	17	(0)
- * Club domestic league appearances and goals as of 24 October 2026

Edoardo Corvi (born 23 March 2001) is an Italian professional footballer who plays as a goalkeeper for Serie A club Parma.

== Club career ==
Corvi was formed as a player in Parma youth system.

He was loaned to Serie C club Legnago Salus, and made his professional debut on 2 May 2021 against Fermana. His loan was extended for the next season.

In 2024 he is promoted to Serie A with Parma.

== Career statistics ==
=== Club ===
As of match played 24 October 2026

Appearances and goals by club, season and competition
Club	Season	League			National cup		Other		Total	
Club	Season	Division	Apps	Goals	Apps	Goals	Apps	Goals	Apps	Goals
Parma	2019–20	Serie A	0	0	0	0	—		0	0
Parma	2022–23	Serie B	5	0	1	0	0	0	6	0
Parma	2023–24	Serie B	2	0	3	0	—		5	0
Parma	2024–25	Serie A	0	0	0	0	—		0	0
Parma	2025–26	Serie A	17	0	0	0	—		17	0
Parma	2026–27	Serie A	8	0	1	0	—		7	0
Parma	Total		32	0	5	0	0	0	37	0
Legnago Salus (loan)	2020–21	Serie C	1	0	—		0	0	1	0
Legnago Salus (loan)	2021–22	Serie C	16	0	—		1	0	17	0
Legnago Salus (loan)	Total		17	0	—		1	0	18	0
Career total			49	0	5	0	1	0	55	0

== Honours ==
Parma

- Serie B: 2023–24
