= Yordan Osorio =

Venezuelan footballer (born 1994)

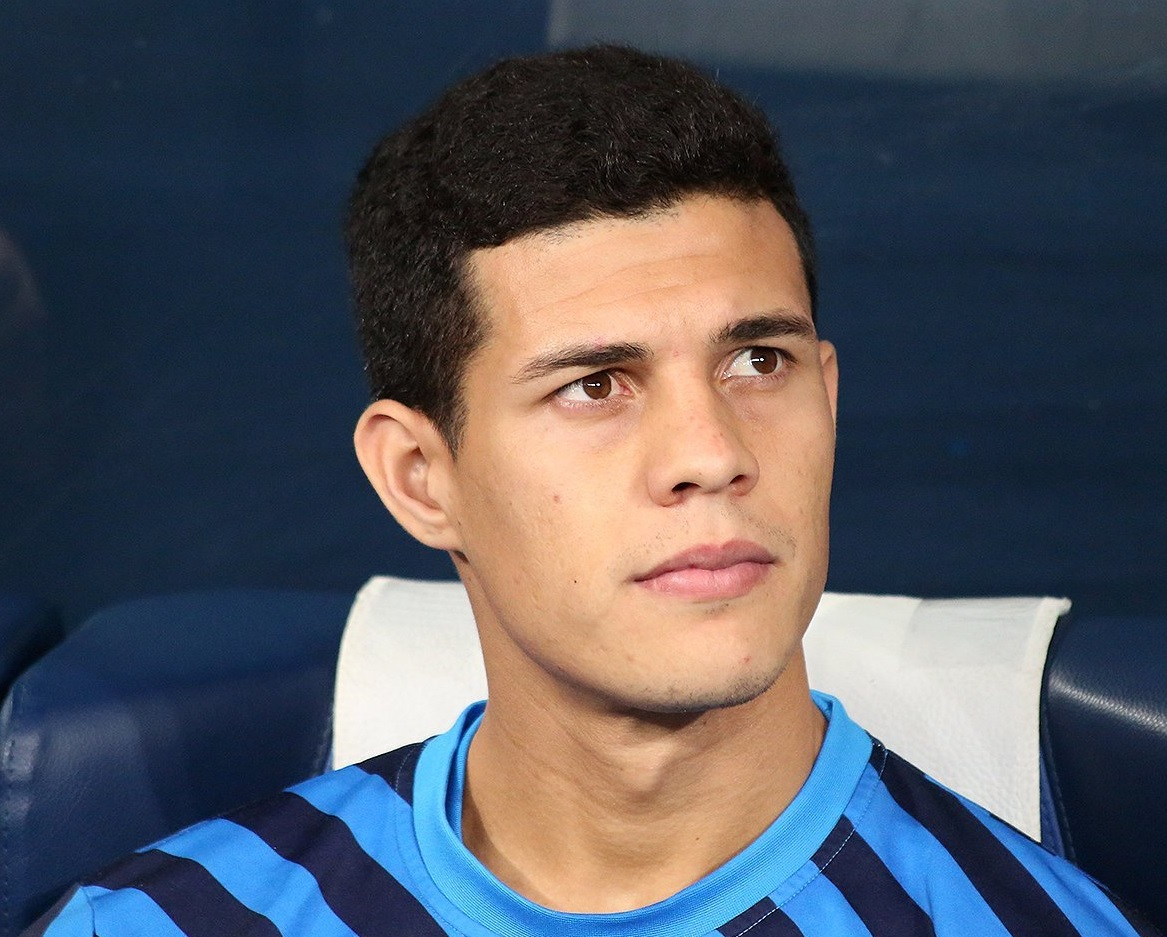
- Osorio with Zenit St. Petersburg in 2019

Personal information
- Full name: Yordan Hernando Osorio Paredes
- Date of birth: 10 May 1994 (age 32)
- Place of birth: Barinas, Venezuela
- Height: 1.89 m (6 ft 2 in)
- Position: Centre-back

Team information
- Current team: Deportes Tolima

Senior career*
Years	Team	Apps	(Gls)
2014–2017	Zamora	84	(5)
2017–2018	Tondela	26	(3)
2018–2020	Porto	1	(0)
2018−2019	→ Vitória Guimarães (loan)	27	(2)
2019–2020	→ Zenit St. Petersburg (loan)	7	(0)
2020–2025	Parma	93	(0)
2025	Deportivo La Guaira	7	(1)
2026–	Deportes Tolima	6	(0)

International career^{‡}
2017–	Venezuela	38	(0)
- * Club domestic league appearances and goals as of 22 August 2026 ‡ National team caps and goals as of 6 October 2026

Yordan Hernando Osorio Paredes (Spanish pronunciation: [ˈɟʝoɾðan oˈsoɾjo]; born 10 May 1994) is a Venezuelan professional footballer who plays for Deportes Tolima and the Venezuela national team.

Formed at Zamora FC, he spent most of his career in Europe, representing Tondela, Porto and Vitória de Guimarães in the Portuguese Primeira Liga, Zenit in the Russian Premier League and Parma in Serie A in Italy. He won a league and cup double on loan at Zenit in 2020.

A full international for Venezuela from 2017, Osorio represented the nation at the 2019 Copa América.

== Club career ==
=== Zamora and Tondela ===
Born in Barinas, Osorio began his career at hometown club Zamora F.C. in the Liga FUTVE, where he won three league titles. In January 2017, he joined C.D. Tondela in Portugal's Primeira Liga on a contract lasting until 2021.

Osorio made his debut for Tondela on 22 January 2017 in a 4–0 loss at S.L. Benfica, as a 79th-minute substitute for Fernando Ferreira. Six days later, he started at home to G.D. Chaves and scored his first goal to open a 2–0 win. In late April, he scored in consecutive wins over Rio Ave F.C. and C.D. Nacional at the Estádio João Cardoso, as his team avoided relegation on goal difference over F.C. Arouca.

=== Porto ===
On 31 January 2018, Osorio moved to league leaders FC Porto on loan for the remainder of the season with an option to buy. He made only one appearance as the Dragons won the title, a 2–0 loss at C.F. Os Belenenses on 2 April, starting in place of the suspended Iván Marcano; a communication error with his defensive partner Felipe led to the first goal.

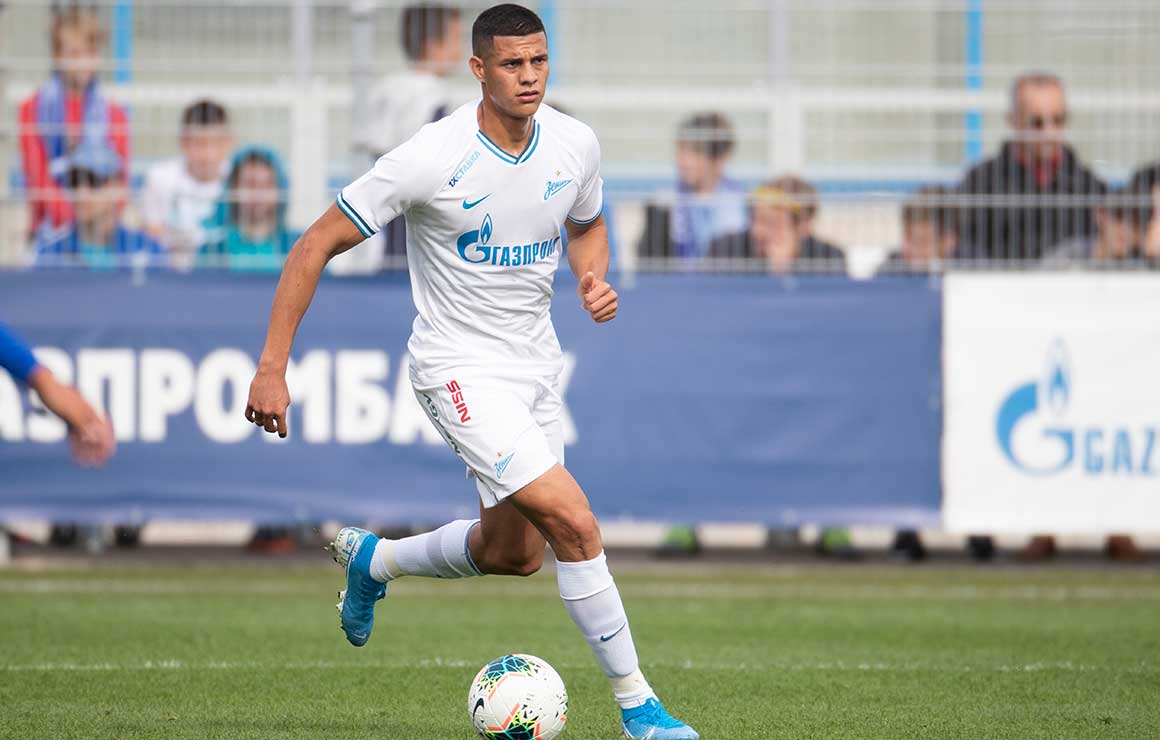
Osorio playing for Zenit in September 2019

Having signed a Porto contract lasting until 2022, Osorio moved on loan to Vitória S.C. on 5 July 2018 for the season. He played 30 total matches for the team from Guimarães and scored twice, including one on 19 May 2019 on the final day of the season to win 3–1 at neighbours Moreirense F.C. to seal fifth place, qualifying for the UEFA Europa League at their expense.

On 31 August 2019, Osorio was loaned to FC Zenit Saint Petersburg for the season, with the option to buy. He made his debut on 17 September in the UEFA Champions League opening group game away to Olympique Lyonnais, a 1–1 draw. His team won the double of Russian Premier League and Russian Cup, though he played only seven times in the former and missed the latter final win over FC Khimki.

=== Parma ===
Osorio left Porto on 5 October 2020, when he joined Italy's Parma Calcio 1913 on a four-year deal for an estimated fee of €4 million. He made his debut on 7 November in the seventh game of the Serie A season, a goalless home draw with ACF Fiorentina, and finished with 23 appearances as his team were relegated. In 2024 he is promoted to Serie A with his team.

== International career ==
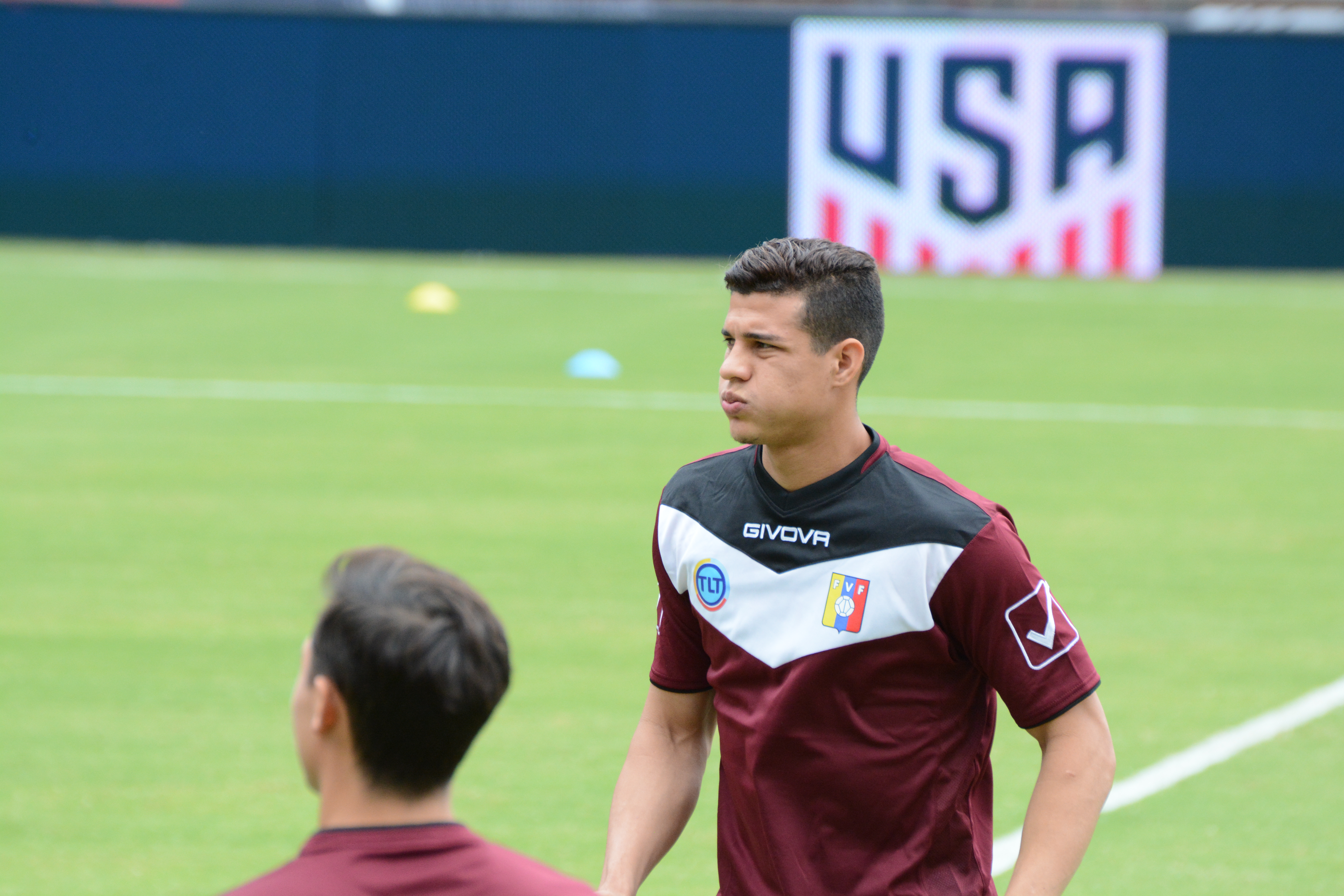
Osorio warming up ahead of a game against the United States in 2019

Osorio was first called up for Venezuela in May 2017, for friendlies against the United States and Ecuador. He made his debut on 4 June in a 1–1 draw with the Americans at the Rio Tinto Stadium in Utah, replacing José Manuel Velázquez after 56 minutes.

Manager Rafael Dudamel called up Osorio to his 23-man squad for the 2019 Copa América in Brazil. He played one of their four matches as they reached the quarter-finals, a goalless draw with the hosts in the second group match on 18 June.

Osorio was one of several Venezuelan players to miss the 2021 Copa América through injury.

== Career statistics ==
=== Club ===
As of match played 22 August 2026

Appearances and goals by club, season and competition
Club	Season	League			National cup (Note: Includes Copa Venezuela, Taça de Portugal, Russian Cup, Coppa Italia)		Continental		Other		Total	
Club	Season	Division	Apps	Goals	Apps	Goals	Apps	Goals	Apps	Goals	Apps	Goals
Zamora	2013–14	Liga FUTVE	1	0	—		0	0	—		1	0
Zamora	2014–15	Liga FUTVE	23	1	—		5 (Note: Appearances in Copa Libertadores)	0	—		28	1
Zamora	2015	Liga FUTVE	21	0	4	0	2 (Note: Appearances in Copa Sudamericana)	0	—		27	0
Zamora	2016	Liga FUTVE	39	4	4	0	4	0	—		47	4
Zamora	Total		84	5	8	0	11	0	—		103	5
Tondela	2016–17	Primeira Liga	15	3	0	0	—		0	0	15	3
Tondela	2017–18	Primeira Liga	11	0	0	0	—		0	0	11	0
Tondela	Total		26	3	0	0	—		0	0	26	3
Porto	2017–18	Primeira Liga	1	0	0	0	0	0	0	0	1	0
Vitória de Guimarães (loan)	2018–19	Primeira Liga	27	2	2	0	—		1 (Note: Appearance in Taça da Liga)	0	30	2
Zenit St. Petersburg (loan)	2019–20	Russian Premier League	7	0	4	0	5 (Note: Appearances in UEFA Champions League)	0	0	0	16	0
Parma	2020–21	Serie A	23	0	1	0	—		—		24	0
Parma	2021–22	Serie B	15	0	1	0	—		—		16	0
Parma	2022–23	Serie B	28	0	1	0	—		2 (Note: Appearances in 2022–23 Serie B promotion play-offs)	0	31	0
Parma	2023–24	Serie B	24	0	3	0	—		0	0	27	0
Parma	2024–25	Serie A	3	0	1	0	—		—		4	0
Parma	Total		93	0	7	0	—		2	0	102	0
Deportivo La Guaira	2025	Liga FUTVE	7	1	3	0	—		—		10	1
Deportes Tolima	2026	Liga DIMAYOR	6	0	1	0	4	0	—		11	0
Career total			251	11	25	0	20	0	3	0	299	11

=== International ===
As of match played 6 October 2026

Appearances and goals by national team and year
National team	Year	Apps	Goals
Venezuela	2017	2	0
Venezuela	2018	3	0
Venezuela	2019	5	0
Venezuela	2020	2	0
Venezuela	2021	2	0
Venezuela	2022	4	0
Venezuela	2023	9	0
Venezuela	2024	9	0
Venezuela	2026	2	0
Total		38	0

== Honours ==
Zamora

- Venezuelan Primera División: 2013–14, 2015, 2016

Porto

- Primeira Liga: 2017–18

Zenit Saint Petersburg

- Russian Premier League: 2019–20
- Russian Cup: 2019–20

Parma

- Serie B: 2023–24

Venezuela

- Kirin Cup: 2019
