= Adrián Bernabé =

Spanish footballer (born 2001)

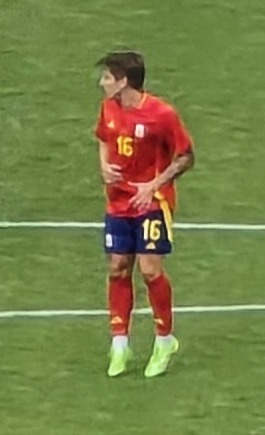
- Bernabé playing for Spain U23 in the 2024 Summer Olympics

Personal information
- Full name: Adrián Bernabé García
- Date of birth: 26 May 2001 (age 25)
- Place of birth: Barcelona, Spain
- Height: 1.70 m (5 ft 7 in)
- Position: Midfielder

Team information
- Current team: Parma
- Number: 10

Youth career
- 2013–2014: Espanyol
- 2014–2018: Barcelona
- 2018–2021: Manchester City

Senior career*
Years	Team	Apps	(Gls)
2021–	Parma	133	(18)

International career^{‡}
2018	Spain U17	3	(0)
2022–2023	Spain U21	5	(0)
2024	Spain U23	6	(0)
Medal record
Men's football
Representing Spain
Olympic Games
Gold medal – first place	2024 Paris
UEFA European Under-21 Championship
Runner-up	2023 Georgia–Romania
- * Club domestic league appearances and goals as of 25 May 2026 ‡ National team caps and goals as of 9 August 2024

Adrián Bernabé García (born 26 May 2001) is a Spanish professional footballer who plays as a midfielder for Serie A club Parma.

== Club career ==
=== Manchester City ===
Born in Barcelona, Catalonia, Bernabé was a youth product of RCD Espanyol and La Masia, the FC Barcelona academy. He joined Manchester City in the summer of 2018. An attacking midfielder, Bernabé joined the first team in pre-season playing against Bayern Munich and played in the EFL Trophy against Shrewsbury Town. On 25 September 2018, Bernabé came on as a late substitute in the EFL Cup against Oxford United, his first senior appearance for Manchester City. Bernabé was released by City at the end of the 2020–21 season.

=== Parma ===
On 7 July 2021, Bernabé signed a three-year contract with Serie B club Parma. Despite being sidelined upon his arrival due to an injury, which caused him to miss the first half of the season, Bernabé finally made his debut for Parma on 5 February 2022, in a league match against Benevento resulting in a 0–0 draw. On 26 February, in a 4–0 league victory against SPAL, he scored his first goal for the club. As a crucial part of the team under manager Giuseppe Iachini, Bernabé stood out, even amidst the club's underwhelming season where they fell short of both direct promotion as well as promotion play-offs to the top division.

Following another strong season with Parma, in which they only just missed out on promotion after losing in the play-offs, Bernabé signed a contract extension with the club until 2026, on 2 July 2023. In 2024 he was promoted to the Serie A with his team.

== International career ==
Bernabé was a youth international for Spain, having called up for the 2023 UEFA European Under-21 Championship. He finished as runner-up as Spain was defeated by England 1-0 in the final.

Bernabé received call-up to Spain U23 for the 2024 Summer Olympics. In the gold medal match of the tournament, Bernabé gave an assist for Spain's fourth goal, and later became an Olympic gold medalist as Spain beat the hosts France 5-3 after extra time in the gold medal match.

== Career statistics ==
As of match played 15 February 2026

Appearances and goals by club, season and competition
Club	Season	League			Cup		League cup (Note: Includes EFL Cup)		Europe		Other		Total	
Club	Season	Division	Apps	Goals	Apps	Goals	Apps	Goals	Apps	Goals	Apps	Goals	Apps	Goals
Manchester City	2018–19	Premier League	0	0	0	0	1	0	0	0	0	0	1	0
Manchester City	2019–20	Premier League	0	0	0	0	3	0	0	0	0	0	3	0
Manchester City	2020–21	Premier League	0	0	0	0	1	0	0	0	0	0	1	0
Manchester City	Total		0	0	0	0	5	0	0	0	0	0	5	0
Parma	2021–22	Serie B	16	5	0	0	—		—		—		16	5
Parma	2022–23	Serie B	29	1	2	0	—		—		2	0	33	1
Parma	2023–24	Serie B	35	8	3	1	—		—		—		38	9
Parma	2024–25	Serie A	21	1	0	0	—		—		—		21	1
Parma	2025–26	Serie A	25	3	2	0	—		—		—		27	3
Parma	Total		126	18	7	1	—		—		2	0	135	19
Career total			126	18	7	1	5	0	0	0	2	0	140	19

== Honours ==
Parma

- Serie B: 2023–24

Spain U21

- UEFA European Under-21 Championship runner-up: 2023

Spain U23

- Summer Olympics gold medal: 2024
