= Nahuel Estévez =

Argentine footballer (born 1995)

Personal information
- Full name: Nahuel Estévez Álvarez
- Date of birth: 14 November 1995 (age 30)
- Place of birth: Buenos Aires, Argentina
- Height: 1.81 m (5 ft 11 in)
- Position: Midfielder

Team information
- Current team: Palermo
- Number: 24

Youth career
- All Boys
- Comunicaciones

Senior career*
Years	Team	Apps	(Gls)
2014–2017	Comunicaciones	84	(8)
2017–2022	Estudiantes	35	(2)
2017–2018	→ Sarmiento (loan)	17	(0)
2020–2021	→ Spezia (loan)	27	(0)
2021–2022	→ Crotone (loan)	27	(0)
2022–2026	Parma	114	(4)
2026–	Palermo	0	(0)
- * Club domestic league appearances and goals as of 30 July 2026

Nahuel Estévez Álvarez (born 14 November 1995) is an Argentine professional footballer who plays as a midfielder for Serie B club Palermo.

== Career ==
Estévez made his professional career debut in August 2014 for Primera B Metropolitana team Comunicaciones, he played the final thirteen minutes of a 2–0 win over Sportivo Italiano. He featured eight times in his debut season of 2014, before making twenty-five appearances in 2015 which included his first senior goal when he scored the winner in an away game with Deportivo Armenio. In his fourth and final season with Comunicaciones, 2016–17, Estévez scored seven goals in 35 matches as the club lost the promotion play-off final to Deportivo Riestra. In total, Estévez scored nine goals in eighty-eight games for the club.

On 4 September 2017, Estévez joined Argentine Primera División side Estudiantes. Months later, he was loaned out to Sarmiento of Primera B Nacional. His 100th career appearance arrived in March 2018 versus Aldosivi. Estévez returned to Estudiantes ahead of the 2018–19 season, subsequently making his club debut in a loss away to Belgrano on 24 August. Three goals and 39 appearances later, on 21 September 2020,

Estévez was loaned to Italian club Spezia. He made his debut for the newly promoted Serie A side on 25 October, in a draw with Parma, having replaced Tommaso Pobega early in the second half.

On 25 August 2021, Estévez joined Crotone on loan until the end of June 2022, with a purchase option, which could become mandatory, in case Crotone got at least one point in the league in the second half of the season. The deal had a total value of 2 million euros.

On 1 July 2022, Estévez moved to Serie B club Parma. In 2024, he was promoted to Serie A with his team.

On 24 June 2026, Estévez left Parma as a free agent. Six days later, he signed for Serie B club Palermo.

== Personal life ==
On 17 March 2021, Estévez tested positive for COVID-19.

== Career statistics ==
As of match played 25 May 2025.

Appearances and goals by club, season and competition
Club	Season	League			National cup		League cup		Continental		Other		Total	
Club	Season	Division	Apps	Goals	Apps	Goals	Apps	Goals	Apps	Goals	Apps	Goals	Apps	Goals
Comunicaciones	2014	Primera B Metropolitana	8	0	1	0	—		—		0	0	9	0
Comunicaciones	2015	Primera B Metropolitana	25	2	2	0	—		—		0	0	27	2
Comunicaciones	2016	Primera B Metropolitana	17	0	0	0	—		—		0	0	17	0
Comunicaciones	2016–17	Primera B Metropolitana	34	6	0	0	—		—		1 (Note: Appearance(s) in Primera B Metropolitana play-offs)	1	35	7
Comunicaciones	Total		84	8	3	0	—		—		1	1	88	9
Estudiantes	2017–18	Argentine Primera División	0	0	0	0	—		—		—		0	0
Estudiantes	2018–19	Argentine Primera División	14	1	1	0	4	0	—		—		19	1
Estudiantes	2019–20	Argentine Primera División	17	1	4	1	0	0	—		—		21	2
Estudiantes	2021	Argentine Primera División	6	0	0	0	—		—		—		6	0
Estudiantes	Total		37	2	5	1	4	0	—		—		46	3
Sarmiento (loan)	2017–18	Primera B Nacional	17	0	0	0	—		—		5 (Note: Appearance(s) in the Primera B Nacional play-offs)	1	22	1
Spezia (loan)	2020–21	Serie A	27	0	2	0	—		—		—		29	0
Crotone (loan)	2021–22	Serie B	27	0	0	0	—		—		—		27	0
Parma	2022–23	Serie B	36	1	3	0	—		—		2	0	41	1
Parma	2023–24	Serie B	32	3	2	0	—		—		—		34	3
Parma	2024–25	Serie A	14	0	1	0	—		—		—		15	0
Parma	Total		82	4	6	0	—		—		2	0	90	4
Career total			274	13	16	1	4	0	0	0	8	2	302	16

== Honours ==
Parma

- Serie B: 2023–24
