= Drissa Camara =

Ivorian footballer (born 2002)

Personal information
- Date of birth: 18 February 2002 (age 24)
- Place of birth: Abobo, Ivory Coast
- Height: 1.79 m (5 ft 10 in)
- Position: Midfielder

Team information
- Current team: Gaziantep
- Number: 3

Youth career
- 2017–2020: Parma

Senior career*
Years	Team	Apps	(Gls)
2020–2025	Parma	64	(6)
2025–	Gaziantep	26	(3)

International career^{‡}
2025–	Ivory Coast U23	1	(0)
- * Club domestic league appearances and goals as of 10 June 2026 ‡ National team caps and goals as of 13:48, 10 June 2025 (UTC)

Drissa Camara (born 18 February 2002) is an Ivorian professional footballer who plays as a midfielder for the Süper Lig club Gaziantep.

== Early life ==
Born in Ivory Coast, Camara was sent in Italy through the illegal immigration system built by an Italian talent scout who was later condemned to one year and ten months in prison.

He still became part of the Parma academy, the club having not been found guilty of any charge in this matter.

== Career ==
Camara first came to light in the 2019 Torneo di Viareggio, scoring four goals in the final stages, including a double in the quarter-final victory against Fiorentina, putting his team in a 3–1 lead.

Camara made his professional debut for Parma Calcio on 25 November 2020, in a Coppa Italia game against Cosenza Calcio, won 2–1 by the Parmigiani.

== International career ==
On 27 May 2025, Camara was called up to the Ivory Coast U23s for a friendly. He debuted with the Ivory Coast U23s in a friendly 3–0 loss to the Netherlands U23s on 6 June 2025.

== Honours ==
Parma

- Serie B: 2023–24
