= Enrico Del Prato =

Italian footballer (born 1999)

Personal information
- Full name: Enrico Del Prato
- Date of birth: 10 November 1999 (age 27)
- Place of birth: Bergamo, Italy
- Height: 1.86 m (6 ft 1 in)
- Positions: Defender; defensive midfielder

Team information
- Current team: Parma
- Number: 15

Youth career
- –2019: Atalanta

Senior career*
Years	Team	Apps	(Gls)
2018–2022	Atalanta	0	(0)
2019–2020	→ Livorno (loan)	33	(1)
2020–2021	→ Reggina (loan)	26	(0)
2021–2022	→ Parma (loan)	34	(1)
2022–	Parma	138	(11)

International career^{‡}
2016–2017	Italy U18	2	(0)
2017–2018	Italy U19	5	(0)
2018–2019	Italy U20	14	(0)
2019–2021	Italy U21	12	(1)
- * Club domestic league appearances and goals as of 25 May 2026 ‡ National team caps and goals as of 31 May 2021

Enrico Del Prato (born 10 November 1999) is an Italian professional footballer who plays as a centre-back, right-back or defensive midfielder for and captains Serie A club Parma.

== Club career ==
=== Atalanta ===
Del Prato is a product of Atalanta youth teams and started playing for their Under-19 squad in the 2016–17 season.

In the 2017–18 Serie A and 2018–19 Serie A seasons, he was called up to the senior squad on several occasions (including the 2019 Coppa Italia Final), but remained on the bench every time.

==== Loan to Livorno ====
On 13 July 2019, he was loaned to Serie B club Livorno.

He made his professional Serie B debut for Livorno on 24 August 2019 in a game against Virtus Entella, substituting Andrea Luci in the 74th minute. He first appeared in the starting lineup and played his first full game on 24 September 2019 against Cosenza.

==== Loan to Reggina ====
On 11 September 2020, he joined Serie B club Reggina on loan.

=== Parma ===
On 31 August 2021, after remaining with Atalanta for the entirety of the preseason, Del Prato joined Serie B club Parma on a one-year loan. Del Prato transferred to Parma on a permanent deal on 21 June 2022.

== International career ==
He was first called up to represent his country in November 2016 with the Under-18 squad.

He was selected for Italy's squad at the 2018 UEFA European Under-19 Championship, but did not make any appearances as Italy finished as runners-up.

At the 2019 FIFA U-20 World Cup, he started every game, except for the group stage game against Japan, as Italy finished in 4th place.

On 6 September 2019 he made his debut for Italy U21 in a friendly against Moldova.

== Career statistics ==
As of match played 8 November 2025

Appearances and goals by club, season and competition
Club	Season	League			Coppa Italia		Europe		Other		Total	
Club	Season	Division	Apps	Goals	Apps	Goals	Apps	Goals	Apps	Goals	Apps	Goals
Atalanta	2017–18	Serie A	0	0	0	0	0	0	—		0	0
Atalanta	2018–19	Serie A	0	0	0	0	0	0	—		0	0
Atalanta	2021–22	Serie A	0	0	—		—		—		0	0
Atalanta	Total		0	0	0	0	0	0	—		0	0
Livorno (loan)	2019–20	Serie B	33	1	0	0	—		—		33	1
Reggina (loan)	2020–21	Serie B	26	0	2	0	—		—		28	0
Parma (loan)	2021–22	Serie B	34	1	0	0	—		—		34	1
Parma	2022–23	Serie B	34	3	3	0	—		2	0	39	3
Parma	2023–24	Serie B	35	2	2	0	—		—		37	2
Parma	2024–25	Serie A	34	4	1	0	—		—		35	4
Parma	2025–26	Serie A	11	1	2	0	—		—		13	1
Parma	Total		114	10	8	0	—		2	0	124	10
Career total			207	12	10	0	0	0	2	0	219	12

== Honours ==
Parma

- Serie B: 2023–24
