= Nathan Buayi-Kiala =

French footballer (born 2004)

Personal information
- Date of birth: 29 February 2004 (age 22)
- Place of birth: Lille, France
- Height: 1.76 m (5 ft 9 in)
- Position: Midfielder

Youth career
- 2010–2014: Mons-en-Barœul
- 2014–2022: Lille

Senior career*
Years	Team	Apps	(Gls)
2021–2022	Lille II	9	(0)
2022–2024	Parma	0	(0)
2023–2024	→ Auxerre (loan)	4	(0)
2023–2024	→ Auxerre II (loan)	9	(0)
2024–2026	Auxerre	0	(0)

International career^{‡}
2019–2020	France U16	8	(1)
2021–2022	France U18	10	(0)
2022–2023	France U19	8	(0)
2023	France U20	1	(0)
- * Club domestic league appearances and goals as of 17 May 2026 ‡ National team caps and goals as of 21 November 2023

Nathan Buayi-Kiala (born 29 February 2004) is a French professional footballer who plays as a midfielder.

== Club career ==
A native of Lille, Buayi-Kiala began his youth career at Mons-en-Barœul, before signing for city's giant Lille OSC at the age of 10. In 2022, he joined Italian club Parma, signing his first professional contract there.

In July 2023, Buayi-Kiala joined Ligue 2 side Auxerre on a loan deal. He appeared in six games at the first half of the season before being unused at the second half of the season. In April 2024, he suffered from a anterior cruciate ligament injury, making him unavailable for several months.

== International career ==
Eligible to represent France and DR Congo, Buayi-Kiala chose to represent France at youth level, having played for France U16, France U18, France U19 and France U20. In 2022, he captained France U18 team that won the gold medal at the 2022 Mediterranean Games, featuring in all 5 games.

== Honours ==
Auxerre

- Ligue 2: 2023–24

France U18

- Mediterranean Games gold medal: 2022
