= Roberto Inglese =

Italian footballer (born 1991)

Personal information
- Date of birth: 12 November 1991 (age 34)
- Place of birth: Lucera, Italy
- Height: 1.87 m (6 ft 2 in)
- Position: Striker

Youth career
- Pescara

Senior career*
Years	Team	Apps	(Gls)
2009–2010	Pescara	4	(1)
2010–2017	Chievo	62	(14)
2010–2013	→ Lumezzane (loan)	70	(16)
2013–2015	→ Carpi (loan)	48	(8)
2017–2020	Napoli	0	(0)
2017–2018	→ Chievo (loan)	34	(12)
2018–2020	→ Parma (loan)	42	(13)
2020–2024	Parma	62	(7)
2024	→ Lecco (loan)	14	(1)
2024–2025	Catania	27	(11)
2025–2026	Salernitana	16	(4)

International career
2017	Italy	0	(0)
- * Club domestic league appearances and goals as of 1 May 2026

Roberto Inglese (Italian pronunciation: [roˈbɛrto iŋˈɡleːze]; born 12 November 1991) is an Italian professional footballer who plays as a striker.

== Club career ==
=== Pescara ===
Born in Lucera, Apulia, Inglese started his professional career at Abruzzo club Pescara. At young age, Inglese had played for Pescara under-18 reserve B team at Berretti League in 2006–07 season. The Reserve B team merged with Reserve A team as the Pescara first team was relegated from Serie B in the 2006–07 season, thus the club's reserve team was no longer eligible to compete in the National Youth "Primavera" League. Inglese was a member of the youth teams and the reserve side until 2010. Inglese also made 6 league appearances in the Italian third division. Pescara won promotion back to the second division as the winners of the 2009–10 Lega Pro Prima Divisione Group B playoffs.

Inglese made his Serie B debut in the first round of 2010–11 Serie B season.

=== Chievo ===
On 28 August 2010, Chievo signed Inglese for €600,000 and Francesco Dettori for €50,000 in co-ownership deal. Co-currently Chievo sold Luca Ariatti to Pescara for €650,000 Thus made the deal a pure swap. On 31 August 2010, Inglese left for Lumezzane in temporary deal, re-joining Chievo teammate Lucas Finazzi. In June 2011 Chievo signed Dettori outright for free and Inglese for €129,000. (That season Chievo paid €29,000 in net to Pescara as the club sold Andrea Mengoni to Pescara in July 2010) In July 2011 the temporary deal was renewed and again on 16 July 2012.

==== Carpi (loan) ====
On 2 September 2013, Inglese was signed by Carpi. Inglese scored his first goal for Carpi in the 2–0 victory away to Spezia on 7 September 2013. Inglese made 21 appearances for Carpi as they went on to finish 12th in Serie B.

==== Carpi (second loan) ====
In July 2014, Inglese once again re-joined Carpi on loan, until 30 June 2015. Inglese scored his first goals of his second loan spell on 15 November 2014, a brace in a 5–2 win against Cittadella. Inglese followed up his goals against Cittadella with two late goals against Brescia seven days later to earn, nine man Carpi, a 3–3 draw.

==== Return to Chievo ====
After two years on loan at Carpi, Inglese returned to Chievo and made his first appearance for the club as well as his Serie A debut on 20 September 2015 in the 0–1 home defeat to Internazionale. He opened his scoring account later on 2 November where he scored his team's only goal in the 1–1 draw against Sampdoria, which was followed by two goals in the next two matches, the first against his former side Carpi and the second against Udinese, striking from 25 metres in an eventual 2–3 home loss. He finished the 2015–16 season by making 26 league appearances, scoring three times in the process, as Chievo finished Serie A in a comfortable 9th place.

On 13 May 2016, Inglese agreed a contract extension that would keep him at Stadio Marc'Antonio Bentegodi until 30 June 2020. Later on 29 November, he scored a brace in Chievo's 3–0 home defeat of Novara in the fourth round of 2016–17 Coppa Italia.

He kicked off 2017 by playing in the 1–0 away defeat to Fiorentina, and scored his first goal on 28 January, a last-minute winner against Lazio. On 12 February 2017, Inglese scored his first Serie A hat-trick in Chievo's 3–1 away win over Sassuolo, also missing a penalty during the same match, becoming only the fourth player in Chievo's history to reach this feat. On 22 October 2017, Inglese scored two goals in a 3–2 victory over fierce rivals Hellas Verona in the Verona derby.

=== Parma ===
Despite being acquired by Napoli in 2017, Inglese never played for gli Azzurri and, on 16 July 2019, he returned at Parma on loan with an obligation to buy after the 2018–19 season.

==== Loan to Lecco ====
On 1 February 2024, Inglese was loaned to Lecco.

=== Catania ===
On 30 August 2024, Inglese joined Catania for one season.

=== Salernitana ===
In July 2025, Inglese joined recently relegated club US Salernitana 1919 for the upcoming season in Serie C on a free transfer.

== International career ==
He received first call-up to the senior Italy squad in October 2017, for World Cup qualifiers against Macedonia and Albania.

== Career statistics ==
As of match played 2 August 2020

Appearances and goals by club, season and competition
Club	Season	League			National Cup		Continental		Other		Total	
Club	Season	Division	Apps	Goals	Apps	Goals	Apps	Goals	Apps	Goals	Apps	Goals
Pescara	2008–09	Lega Pro	3	0	0	0	—		—		3	0
Pescara	2009–10	Lega Pro	3	1	0	0	—		—		3	1
Pescara	2010–11	Serie B	1	0	1	0	—		—		2	0
Pescara	Total		7	1	1	0	0	0	0	0	8	1
Lumezzane (loan)	2010–11	Lega Pro	20	0	0	0	—		—		20	0
Lumezzane (loan)	2011–12	Lega Pro	20	5	2	3	—		—		22	8
Lumezzane (loan)	2012–13	Lega Pro	30	11	2	2	—		—		32	13
Lumezzane (loan)	Total		70	16	4	5	0	0	0	0	74	21
Carpi (loan)	2013–14	Serie B	22	2	0	0	—		—		22	2
Carpi (loan)	2013–14	Serie B	26	6	1	0	—		—		27	6
Carpi (loan)	Total		48	8	1	0	0	0	0	0	49	8
Chievo	2015–16	Serie A	26	3	0	0	—		—		26	3
Chievo	2016–17	Serie A	34	10	3	2	—		—		37	12
Chievo	2017–18	Serie A	34	12	2	1	—		—		36	13
Chievo	Total		94	25	5	3	0	0	0	0	99	28
Parma	2018–19	Serie A	25	9	0	0	—		—		25	9
Parma	2019–20	Serie A	17	4	2	0	—		—		19	4
Parma	Total		42	13	2	0	0	0	0	0	44	13
Career total			261	63	13	8	0	0	0	0	274	71
