= 2021–22 Parma Calcio 1913 season =

Parma Calcio season

Parma
2021–22 season
- Chairman: Kyle Krause
- Manager: Enzo Maresca (until 23 November); Giuseppe Iachini (from 23 November)
- Stadium: Stadio Ennio Tardini
- Serie B: 12th
- Coppa Italia: First round
- Top goalscorer: League: Franco Vázquez (14); All: Franco Vázquez (14)
Home colours	Away colours	Third colours

The 2021–22 season was Parma Calcio 1913's 108th season in existence. In addition to the Serie B, Parma participated in this season's edition of the Coppa Italia. On 27 May 2021, Parma announced that Enzo Maresca would be the new team's coach.

== Serie B ==
=== League table ===
Pos	Team	Pld	W	D	L	GF	GA	GD	Pts
10	Ternana	38	15	9	14	58	61	−3	54
11	Cittadella	38	13	13	12	38	36	+2	52
12	Parma	38	11	16	11	48	43	+5	49
13	Como	38	11	14	13	49	54	−5	47
14	Reggina (Note: Reggina were deducted 2 points for administrative irregularities.)	38	13	9	16	31	49	−18	46

Source: Lega Serie B (in Italian), Soccerway (in English)
Rules for classification: 1) Points; 2) Head-to-head points; 3) Head-to-head goal difference; 4) Goal difference; 5) Goals scored; 6) Draw.

=== Results summary ===
Overall								Home						Away					
Pld	W	D	L	GF	GA	GD	Pts	W	D	L	GF	GA	GD	W	D	L	GF	GA	GD
38	11	16	11	48	43	+5	49	5	9	5	25	20	+5	6	7	6	23	23	0

=== Results by round ===
Date	Venue	Opponent	Result	Scorers	Attendance
20 August 2021	Away	Frosinone	2–2	Tutino 41', Man 52'	5,094
29 August 2021	Home	Benevento	1–0	Mihăilă 90'+7'	3,550
12 September 2021	Away	Pordenone	4–0	Vázquez 19', Jurić 38', Inglese 64', Man 80'	1,830
19 September 2021	Home	Cremonese	1–2	Mihăilă 69'	5,581
22 September 2021	Away	Ternana	1–3	Benedyczak 76'	4,611
26 September 2021	Home	Pisa	1–1	Delprato 53'	7,254
2 October 2021	Away	SPAL	2–2	Viviani 82', Colombo 90'	3,720
17 October 2021	Home	Monza	0–0		7,555
24 October 2021	Home	Reggina	1–2	Vázquez 82'	8,693
28 October 2021	Away	Cittadella	2–1	Vázquez 23', Benedyczak 83'	3,126
1 November 2021	Home	Vicenza	1–0	Benedyczak 43'	5,116
7 November 2021	Away	Lecce	0–4		18,765
21 November 2021	Home	Cosenza	1–1	Jurić 12'	6,137
28 November 2021	Away	Como	1–1	Inglese 85'	3,689
1 December 2021	Home	Brescia	0–1		5,138
5 December 2021	Away	Ascoli	0–0		6,837
12 December 2021	Home	Perugia	1–1	Inglese 11'	4,935
19 December 2021	Away	Alessandria	2–0	Vázquez 31', Benedyczak 42'	4,907
21 January 2022	Home	Frosinone	0–1		4,506
30 January 2022	Home	Crotone	1–1	Vázquez 37'	4,934
5 February 2022	Away	Benevento	0–0		3,135
12 February 2022	Home	Pordenone	4–1	Pandev 55', Man 67', Vázquez 69', Benedyczak 79'	4,614
15 February 2022	Away	Cittadella	1–3	Simy 61'	4,847
19 February 2022	Home	Ternana	2–3	Cobbaut 16', Vázquez 22'	4,629
22 February 2022	Away	Pisa	0–0		5,560
26 February 2022	Home	SPAL	4–0	Tutino 27', Bernabé 33', Vázquez 62', Benedyczak 68'	5,286
2 March 2022	Away	Monza	1–1	Vázquez 30'	3,789
5 March 2022	Home	Reggina	1–1	Brunetta 20'	6,125
11 March 2022	Home	Cittadella	1–1	Beretta 26'	4,733
15 March 2022	Away	Vicenza	1–0	Tutino 32'	5,859
19 March 2022	Home	Lecce	0–0		7,916
2 April 2022	Away	Cosenza	3–1	Bernabé (2) 9' 88', Danilo 48'	2,252
6 April 2022	Home	Como	4–3	Vázquez 31', Bernabé (2) 77', 81', Tutino 85'	5,310
10 April 2022	Away	Brescia	0–1		6,715
18 April 2022	Home	Ascoli	0–1		7,309
25 April 2022	Away	Perugia	1–2	Vázquez 72'	4,750
30 April 2022	Home	Alessandria	2–2	Cobbaut 43', Vázquez 58'	6,566
6 May 2022	Away	Crotone	1–0	Vázquez 30'	

== Coppa Italia ==
Results list Parma's goal tally first.

Date	Round	Opponent	Venue	Result	Scorers	Attendance
7 August 2021	First round	Lecce	Home	1–3	Brunetta 9'	1,306
