= 2020–21 Parma Calcio 1913 season =

Parma
2020–21 season
- Owner: Nuovo Inizio Srl
- Chairman: Pietro Pizzarotti
- Head coach: Fabio Liverani (until 7 January); Roberto D'Aversa (from 7 January)
- Stadium: Stadio Ennio Tardini
- Serie A: 20th (relegated)
- Coppa Italia: Round of 16
- Top goalscorer: League: Juraj Kucka (7); All: Juraj Kucka (7)
Home colours	Away colours	Third colours

The 2020–21 Parma Calcio 1913 season was the club's 107th season in existence and its third consecutive season in the top flight of Italian football. In addition to the domestic league, Parma participated in this season's edition of the Coppa Italia. The season covered the period from 1 September 2020 to 30 June 2021.

== Players ==
=== First-team squad ===
As of 5 February 2021

Note: Flags indicate national team as defined under FIFA eligibility rules; some limited exceptions apply. Players may hold more than one non-FIFA nationality.

No.	Pos.	Nation	Player
1	GK	ITA	Luigi Sepe
2	DF	ITA	Simone Iacoponi (3rd captain)
3	DF	ITA	Giuseppe Pezzella
4	DF	HUN	Botond Balogh
5	DF	ITA	Andrea Conti (on loan from Milan)
7	DF	SWE	Riccardo Gagliolo
8	MF	ITA	Alberto Grassi
9	FW	ITA	Graziano Pellè
10	FW	FRA	Yann Karamoh
11	FW	DEN	Andreas Cornelius (on loan from Atalanta)
13	DF	ITA	Mattia Bani (on loan from Genoa)
14	MF	SLO	Jasmin Kurtić
15	MF	URU	Gastón Brugman
16	DF	FRA	Vincent Laurini
17	FW	NED	Joshua Zirkzee (on loan from Bayern Munich)
18	MF	FRA	Wylan Cyprien (on loan from Nice)
19	MF	SUI	Simon Sohm

No.	Pos.	Nation	Player
20	DF	GRE	Vasilis Zagaritis
22	DF	POR	Bruno Alves (captain)
23	MF	BRA	Hernani
24	DF	VEN	Yordan Osorio
27	FW	CIV	Gervinho (vice-captain)
28	MF	ROU	Valentin Mihăilă
30	DF	ARG	Lautaro Valenti (on loan from Lanús)
32	MF	ARG	Juan Brunetta (on loan from Godoy Cruz)
33	MF	SVK	Juraj Kucka (4th captain)
34	GK	ITA	Simone Colombi
37	MF	CIV	Drissa Camara
41	MF	ITA	Hans Nicolussi (on loan from Juventus)
42	DF	BEL	Maxime Busi
45	FW	ITA	Roberto Inglese
77	GK	ITA	Filippo Rinaldi
93	MF	ITA	Mattia Sprocati
98	FW	ROU	Dennis Man

=== Other players under contract ===
As of 21 January 2021

Note: Flags indicate national team as defined under FIFA eligibility rules; some limited exceptions apply. Players may hold more than one non-FIFA nationality.

No.	Pos.	Nation	Player
35	MF	CIV	Chaka Traorè
—	MF	ITA	Vincenzo Mustacciolo

=== Out on loan ===
As of 1 February 2021

Note: Flags indicate national team as defined under FIFA eligibility rules; some limited exceptions apply. Players may hold more than one non-FIFA nationality.

No.	Pos.	Nation	Player
—	GK	ITA	Edoardo Corvi (at Legnago until 30 June 2021)
—	GK	ITA	Andrea Dini (at Calcio Padova until 30 June 2021)
—	DF	ITA	Giacomo Ricci (at Venezia F.C. until 30 June 2021)
—	GK	ITA	Fabrizio Alastra (at Pescara until 30 June 2021)
—	DF	ITA	Matteo Darmian (at Inter Milan until 30 June 2021)
—	DF	ALB	Kastriot Dermaku (at Lecce until 30 June 2021)
—	DF	ITA	Alessandro Martella (at AJ Fano until 30 June 2021)
—	DF	ITA	Niccolò Monti (at AJ Fano until 30 June 2021)
—	MF	ITA	Gabriele Carannante (at Turris until 30 June 2021)
—	MF	ALB	Redi Kasa (at Fermana until 30 June 2021)
—	MF	ITA	Stefano Palmucci (at Triestina until 30 June 2021)

No.	Pos.	Nation	Player
—	MF	ITA	Lorenzo Simonetti (at Pistoiese until 30 June 2021)
—	FW	ITA	Andrea Adorante (at Virtus Francavilla until 30 June 2021)
—	FW	ITA	Walid Cheddira (at Mantova until 30 June 2021)
—	FW	NED	Alessio Da Cruz (at FC Groningen until 30 June 2021)
—	FW	ITA	Francesco Golfo (at Catania until 30 June 2021)
—	FW	ITA	Eric Lanini (at Novara until 30 June 2021)
—	FW	ITA	Manuel Nocciolini (at Renate until 30 June 2021)
—	FW	ITA	Fabian Pavone (at Carrarese until 30 June 2021)
—	FW	ITA	Luca Siligardi (at AC Reggiana until 30 June 2021)
—	FW	CIV	Muhamed Olawale (at IFK Mariehamn until 31 December 2021)
—	DF	ITA	Michele Laraspata (at Ħamrun Spartans F.C. until 30 June 2021)

== Pre-season and friendlies ==
Win Draw Loss Fixtures

1 September 2020 Friendly	Parma (Italy)	2–0	(Italy) Carpi	Collecchio, Italy
17:30 CEST (UTC+2)	Grassi 26'; Inglese 31'	Report		Stadium: Centro Sportivo di Collecchio; Attendance: 0 Referee: Michele Molinaroli

6 September 2020 Friendly	Parma (Italy)	0–2	(Italy) Empoli	Parma, Italy
17:30 CEST (UTC+2)		Report	Mancuso 32', 40'	Stadium: Stadio Ennio Tardini; Attendance: 0

10 September 2020 Friendly	Parma (Italy)	6–0	(Italy) Pro Sesto	Parma, Italy
17:30 CEST (UTC+2)	Inglese 15' (pen.); Darmian 55'; Dezi 58'; Gervinho 62'; Simonetti 68'; Siligardi 79'	Report		Stadium: Stadio Ennio Tardini; Attendance: 0

== Competitions ==
=== Overview ===
Competition	First match	Last match	Starting round	Final position	Record							
Competition	First match	Last match	Starting round	Final position	Pld	W	D	L	GF	GA	GD	Win %
Serie A	20 September 2020	22 May 2021	Matchday 1	20th	38	3	11	24	39	83	−44	7.89
Coppa Italia	28 October 2020	21 January 2021	Third round	Round of 16	3	2	0	1	6	4	+2	66.67
Total					41	5	11	25	45	87	−42	12.20

Last updated: 22 May 2021
Source: Soccerway

=== Serie A ===
==== League table ====
Pos	Team	Pld	W	D	L	GF	GA	GD	Pts	Qualification or relegation
16	Cagliari	38	9	10	19	43	59	−16	37	
17	Torino	38	7	16	15	50	69	−19	37	
18	Benevento (R)	38	7	12	19	40	75	−35	33	Relegation to Serie B
19	Crotone (R)	38	6	5	27	45	92	−47	23	Relegation to Serie B
20	Parma (R)	38	3	11	24	39	83	−44	20	Relegation to Serie B

Source: Serie A, Soccerway
Rules for classification: 1) Points; 2) Head-to-head points; 3) Head-to-head goal difference; 4) Goal difference; 5) Goals scored; 6) Draw. (Note: Head-to-head record is used only after all the matches between the teams in question have been played)
(R) Relegated

==== Results summary ====
Overall								Home						Away					
Pld	W	D	L	GF	GA	GD	Pts	W	D	L	GF	GA	GD	W	D	L	GF	GA	GD
38	3	11	24	39	83	−44	20	2	5	12	16	39	−23	1	6	12	23	44	−21

Last updated: 22 May 2021.
Source: Serie A

==== Results by round ====
Round	1	2	3	4	5	6	7	8	9	10	11	12	13	14	15	16	17	18	19	20	21	22	23	24	25	26	27	28	29	30	31	32	33	34	35	36	37	38
Ground	H	A	H	A	H	A	H	A	A	H	A	H	H	A	H	A	H	A	H	A	H	A	H	A	H	A	H	H	A	H	A	A	H	A	H	A	H	A
Result	L	L	W	L	D	D	D	L	W	D	D	D	L	L	L	L	L	D	L	L	L	L	D	D	L	D	W	L	D	L	L	L	L	L	L	L	L	L
Position	17	20	15	18	15	15	15	17	16	16	14	14	15	16	16	18	19	19	19	19	19	19	19	19	19	19	19	19	19	19	19	19	19	19	19	20	20	20

Updated to match(es) played on 22 May 2021. Source: Serie A
A = Away; H = Home; W = Win; D = Draw; L = Loss

==== Matches ====
The league fixtures were announced on 2 September 2020.

20 September 2020 1	Parma	0–2	Napoli	Parma
12:30 CEST (UTC+2)	Darmian (yellow card) 36'; Alves (yellow card) 59'; Pezzella (yellow card) 73'; Kucka (yellow card) 75'	Report	Demme (yellow card) 35'; Mertens 63'; Insigne 77'	Stadium: Stadio Ennio Tardini; Referee: Maurizio Mariani

28 September 2020 2	Bologna	4–1	Parma	Bologna
20:45 CEST (UTC+2)	Soriano 16', 30'; Olsen 56'; Sansone (yellow card) 86'; Palacio 90+2'	Report	Kucka (yellow card) 60'; Hernani 67'; Laurini (yellow card) 70'; Iacoponi (red card) 76'	Stadium: Stadio Renato Dall'Ara; Referee: Paolo Valeri

4 October 2020 3	Parma	1–0	Hellas Verona	Parma
15:00 CEST (UTC+2)	Kurtić 1'; Alves (yellow card) 20'	Report	Dimarco (yellow card) 66'	Stadium: Stadio Ennio Tardini; Referee: Antonio Giua

18 October 2020 4	Udinese	3–2	Parma	Udine
18:00 CEST (UTC+2)	Samir 28'; Becão (yellow card) 32'; Arslan (yellow card) 45'; Iacoponi 52' (o.g.); Pussetto 88'; Makengo (yellow card) 90+1'	Report	Hernani 26'; Brugman (yellow card) 57'; Karamoh 70'; Iacoponi (yellow card) 73'	Stadium: Stadio Friuli; Referee: Michael Fabbri

25 October 2020 5	Parma	2–2	Spezia	Parma
15:00 CET (UTC+1)	Grassi (yellow card) 5'; Hernani (yellow card) 23'; Gagliolo 34'; Sohm (yellow card) 90'; Kucka 90+2' (pen.)	Report	Pobega (yellow card) 6'; Chabot 28'; Agudelo 31'; Ferrer (yellow card) 85'	Stadium: Stadio Ennio Tardini; Referee: Valerio Marini

31 October 2020 6	Internazionale	2–2	Parma	Milan
18:00 CET (UTC+1)	Brozović 64'; Ranocchia (yellow card) 67'; Perišić 90+2'	Report	Hernani (yellow card) 23'; Gervinho 46', 62'	Stadium: San Siro; Attendance: 0 Referee: Marco Piccinini

7 November 2020 7	Parma	0–0	Fiorentina	Parma
20:45 CET (UTC+1)	Pezzella (yellow card) 68'	Report	Ribéry (yellow card) 42'; Milenković (yellow card) 73'	Stadium: Stadio Ennio Tardini; Attendance: 0 Referee: Federico La Penna

22 November 2020 8	Roma	3–0	Parma	Rome
15:00 CET (UTC+1)	Mayoral 28'; Mkhitaryan 32', 40'	Report		Stadium: Stadio Olimpico; Attendance: 0 Referee: Gianluca Manganiello

30 November 2020 9	Genoa	1–2	Parma	Genoa
20:45 CET (UTC+1)	Shomurodov 50'; Badelj (yellow card) 76'; Bani (yellow card) 84'	Report	Gervinho 10', 47'; Busi (yellow card) 58'; Karamoh (yellow card) 67'	Stadium: Stadio Luigi Ferraris; Attendance: 0 Referee: Maurizio Mariani

6 December 2020 10	Parma	0–0	Benevento	Parma
15:00 CET (UTC+1)	Hernani (yellow card) 17'; Scozzarella (yellow card) 48'; Brunetta (yellow card) 73'; Kurtić (yellow card) 89'	Report	Ioniță (yellow card) 34'; Barba (yellow card) 58'; Improta (yellow card) 84'; Tello (yellow card) 90+2'	Stadium: Stadio Ennio Tardini; Attendance: 0 Referee: Juan Luca Sacchi

13 December 2020 11	Milan	2–2	Parma	Milan
20:45 CET (UTC+1)	Hernandez (yellow card) 35', (goal) 58', 90+1'; Calabria (yellow card) 80'; Kalulu (yellow card) 83'	Report	Hernani 13'; Osorio (yellow card) 41'; Kurtić 56'; Iacoponi (yellow card) 64'; Inglese (yellow card) 76'	Stadium: San Siro; Attendance: 0 Referee: Francesco Fourneau

16 December 2020 12	Parma	0–0	Cagliari	Parma
20:45 CET (UTC+1)	Cornelius (yellow card) 90+3'	Report	Oliva (yellow card) 25'	Stadium: Stadio Ennio Tardini; Attendance: 0 Referee: Ivano Pezzuto

19 December 2020 13	Parma	0–4	Juventus	Parma
20:45 CET (UTC+1)		Report	Kulusevski 23'; Ronaldo 26', 48'; Danilo (yellow card) 40'; Morata 86'	Stadium: Stadio Ennio Tardini; Attendance: 0 Referee: Gianpaolo Calvarese

22 December 2020 14	Crotone	2–1	Parma	Crotone
18:30 CET (UTC+1)	Messias 24', 44'; Cuomo (yellow card) 55'; Golemić (yellow card) 79'; Reca (yellow card) 90+1'; Luperto (yellow card) 90+3'	Report	Kurtić (yellow card) 33'; Hernani (yellow card) 45+1'; Kucka (yellow card) 46', (goal) 57'; Inglese (yellow card) 47'; Cyprien (yellow card) 88'; Iacoponi (yellow card) 90+1'	Stadium: Stadio Ezio Scida; Attendance: 0 Referee: Fabio Maresca

3 January 2021 15	Parma	0–3	Torino	Parma
15:00 CET (UTC+1)	Gagliolo (yellow card) 30'; Alves (yellow card) 87'	Report	Singo 8'; Verdi (yellow card) 32'; Izzo 88', (yellow card) 90'; Gojak 90+5'	Stadium: Stadio Ennio Tardini; Attendance: 0 Referee: Daniele Doveri

6 January 2021 16	Atalanta	3–0	Parma	Bergamo
15:00 CET (UTC+1)	Muriel 15'; Pessina (yellow card) 45'; Zapata 49'; Gosens 61'	Report	Cyprien (yellow card) 39'	Stadium: Gewiss Stadium; Attendance: 0 Referee: Juan Luca Sacchi

10 January 2021 17	Parma	0–2	Lazio	Parma
15:00 CET (UTC+1)	Busi (yellow card) 23'; Brugman (yellow card) 28'; Hernani (yellow card) 63'; Balogh (yellow card) 66'	Report	Luis Alberto 55'; Caicedo 67'; Akpa Akpro (yellow card) 69'	Stadium: Stadio Ennio Tardini; Attendance: 0 Referee: Luca Pairetto

17 January 2021 18	Sassuolo	1–1	Parma	Reggio Emilia
15:00 CET (UTC+1)	Chiricheș (yellow card) 1'; Lopez (yellow card) 71'; Rogério (yellow card) 77'; Đuričić 90+5' (pen.)	Report	Kucka 37'; Brugman (yellow card) 80'; Busi (yellow card) 84'	Stadium: Mapei Stadium; Attendance: 0 Referee: Ivano Pezzuto

24 January 2021 19	Parma	0–2	Sampdoria	Parma
20:45 CET (UTC+1)	Kucka (yellow card) 32'	Report	Yoshida 25'; Keita (yellow card) 32', (goal) 34'	Stadium: Stadio Ennio Tardini; Attendance: 0 Referee: Gianluca Manganiello

31 January 2021 20	Napoli	2–0	Parma	Naples
18:00 CET (UTC+1)	Elmas 32', (yellow card) 75'; Demme (yellow card) 71'; Politano 82'	Report	Gagliolo (yellow card) 5'; Pezzella (yellow card) 31'; Conti (yellow card) 71'; Brugman (yellow card) 76'	Stadium: Stadio San Paolo; Attendance: 0 Referee: Federico La Penna

7 February 2021 21	Parma	0–3	Bologna	Parma
18:00 CET (UTC+1)	Conti (yellow card) 35'; Gagliolo (yellow card) 75'	Report	Barrow 15', 33'; Svanberg (yellow card) 62'; Orsolini 90+2'	Stadium: Stadio Ennio Tardini; Attendance: 0 Referee: Marco Guida

15 February 2021 22	Hellas Verona	2–1	Parma	Verona
20:45 CET (UTC+1)	Silvestri (yellow card) 7'; Grassi 13' (o.g.); Dimarco (yellow card) 39'; Günter (yellow card) 52'; Barák 61'; Lovato (yellow card) 90+1'	Report	Kucka 8' (pen.); Cornelius (yellow card) 36'; Mihăilă (yellow card) 86'	Stadium: Stadio Marcantonio Bentegodi; Attendance: 0 Referee: Luca Massimi

21 February 2021 23	Parma	2–2	Udinese	Parma
12:30 CET (UTC+1)	Cornelius 3', (yellow card) 19'; Brugman (yellow card) 10'; Bani (yellow card) 29'; Kucka 32' (pen.); Mihăilă (yellow card) 37'; Hernani (yellow card) 59'; Conti (yellow card) 78'; Man (yellow card) 83'	Report	Zeegelaar (yellow card) 25'; Musso (yellow card) 37'; Okaka 64'; Nuytinck 80'; De Paul (yellow card) 81'; Pereyra (yellow card) 90+4'	Stadium: Stadio Ennio Tardini; Attendance: 0 Referee: Massimiliano Irrati

27 February 2021 24	Spezia	2–2	Parma	La Spezia
15:00 CET (UTC+1)	Ricci (yellow card) 21'; Gyasi 52', 72'; Nzola (yellow card) 87'; Acampora (yellow card) 90'	Report	Brunetta (yellow card) 9'; Karamoh 17'; Hernani 25', (yellow card) 50'; Kurtić (yellow card) 84'; Gagliolo (yellow card) 85'	Stadium: Stadio Alberto Picco; Attendance: 0 Referee: Daniele Orsato

4 March 2021 25	Parma	1–2	Internazionale	Parma
20:45 CET (UTC+1)	Hernani 71'	Report	Sánchez 54', 62'; Darmian (yellow card) 90+3'	Stadium: Stadio Ennio Tardini; Attendance: 0 Referee: Fabrizio Pasqua

7 March 2021 26	Fiorentina	3–3	Parma	Florence
15:00 CET (UTC+1)	Martínez Quarta 28'; Milenković 42'; Iacoponi 90+4' (o.g.)	Report	Kucka 32' (pen.), (yellow card) 56'; Pezzella (yellow card) 62'; Kurtić 72'; Bani (yellow card) 80'; Mihăilă 90'	Stadium: Stadio Artemio Franchi; Attendance: 0 Referee: Rosario Abisso

14 March 2021 27	Parma	2–0	Roma	Parma
15:00 CET (UTC+1)	Mihăilă 9'; Osorio (yellow card) 23'; Hernani 55' (pen.), (yellow card) 66'; Karamoh (yellow card) 90+3'	Report	Peres (yellow card) 32'; Pellegrini (yellow card) 54'; Džeko (yellow card) 69'	Stadium: Stadio Ennio Tardini; Attendance: 0 Referee: Marco Piccinini

19 March 2021 28	Parma	1–2	Genoa	Parma
20:45 CET (UTC+1)	Pellè 16', (yellow card) 72'; Bani (yellow card) 19'; Pezzella (yellow card) 57'; Brugman (yellow card) 78'; Kucka (yellow card) 90+5'	Report	Scamacca 50', 69'; Radovanović (yellow card) 73'; Biraschi (yellow card) 84'	Stadium: Stadio Ennio Tardini; Attendance: 0 Referee: Daniele Doveri

3 April 2021 29	Benevento	2–2	Parma	Benevento
15:00 CEST (UTC+2)	Glik 23'; Ioniță 67'; Hetemaj (yellow card) 76'; Di Serio (yellow card) 84'	Report	Bani (yellow card) 48'; Kurtić 55'; Man 88'	Stadium: Stadio Ciro Vigorito; Attendance: 0 Referee: Davide Massa

10 April 2021 30	Parma	1–3	Milan	Parma
18:00 CEST (UTC+2)	Bani (yellow card) 10'; Pezzella (yellow card) 37'; Gagliolo (yellow card) 38', (goal) 66'; Kucka (yellow card) 64'	Report	Rebić 8'; Çalhanoğlu (yellow card) 24'; Kessié 44', (yellow card) 81'; Ibrahimović (red card) 60'; Hernandez (yellow card) 78'; Meïté (yellow card) 90'; Leão 90+4'	Stadium: Stadio Ennio Tardini; Attendance: 0 Referee: Fabio Maresca

17 April 2021 31	Cagliari	4–3	Parma	Cagliari
20:45 CEST (UTC+2)	Marin (yellow card) 30', (goal) 66'; Pavoletti 39'; Duncan (yellow card) 48'; Nández (yellow card) 80'; Nainggolan (yellow card) 83'; Pereiro 90+1'; Cerri 90+4'	Report	Pezzella 5', (yellow card) 24'; Kucka 31'; Kurtić (yellow card) 58'; Man 59'	Stadium: Sardegna Arena; Attendance: 0 Referee: Paolo Valeri

21 April 2021 32	Juventus	3–1	Parma	Turin
20:45 CEST (UTC+2)	McKennie (yellow card) 23'; Alex Sandro 43', 47'; De Ligt 68'; Ronaldo (yellow card) 90+3'	Report	Brugman 25'; Hernani (yellow card) 88'; Karamoh (yellow card) 90+2'	Stadium: Allianz Stadium; Attendance: 0 Referee: Piero Giacomelli

24 April 2021 33	Parma	3–4	Crotone	Parma
18:00 CEST (UTC+2)	Hernani 29'; Gervinho 49'; Mihăilă 54'; Brugman (yellow card) 56'; Cornelius (yellow card) 76'; Grassi (yellow card) 78'	Report	Magallán 14'; Simy 42', 69' (pen.); Ounas 45+1'; Messias (yellow card) 70'; Eduardo (yellow card) 90+2'	Stadium: Stadio Ennio Tardini; Attendance: 0 Referee: Antonio Rapuano

3 May 2021 34	Torino	1–0	Parma	Turin
20:45 CEST (UTC+2)	Vojvoda 63'	Report	Dierckx (yellow card) 10'; Hernani (yellow card) 65'; Kucka (yellow card) 72'	Stadium: Stadio Olimpico Grande Torino; Attendance: 0 Referee: Gianluca Aureliano

9 May 2021 35	Parma	2–5	Atalanta	Parma
15:00 CEST (UTC+2)	Grassi (yellow card) 44'; Brunetta 78'; Sohm 88'	Report	Malinovskyi 12'; Pessina 52'; Hateboer (yellow card) 72'; Muriel 77', 86'; Miranchuk 90+3'	Stadium: Stadio Ennio Tardini; Attendance: 0 Referee: Antonio Giua

12 May 2021 36	Lazio	1–0	Parma	Rome
20:45 CEST (UTC+2)	Acerbi (yellow card) 90'; Immobile 90+5'	Report	Brunetta (yellow card) 10'; Gagliolo (yellow card) 49'; Hernani (yellow card) 90+2'	Stadium: Stadio Olimpico; Attendance: 0 Referee: Federico Dionisi

16 May 2021 37	Parma	1–3	Sassuolo	Parma
18:00 CEST (UTC+2)	Kurtić (yellow card) 28'; Alves 32'	Report	Locatelli 25' (pen.); Defrel 62'; Boga 69'	Stadium: Stadio Ennio Tardini; Attendance: 0 Referee: Marco Piccinini

22 May 2021 38	Sampdoria	3–0	Parma	Genoa
20:45 CEST (UTC+2)	Quagliarella 20'; Colley 44'; Léris (yellow card) 48'; Gabbiadini 64'	Report	Bani (yellow card) 49'	Stadium: Stadio Luigi Ferraris; Attendance: 0 Referee: Daniele Paterna

=== Coppa Italia ===
28 October 2020 Third round	Parma	3–1	Pescara	Parma
18:00 CET (UTC+1)	Karamoh 26', 43'; Adorante 70'	Report	Nzita 90+1'	Stadium: Stadio Ennio Tardini; Referee: Simone Sozza

25 November 2020 Fourth round	Parma	2–1	Cosenza	Parma
14:30 CET (UTC+1)	Brunetta 13', 39'; Iacoponi (yellow card) 29'	Report	Corsi 38'; Kone (yellow card) 48'; Schiavi (yellow card) 55'	Stadium: Stadio Ennio Tardini; Referee: Giacomo Camplone

21 January 2021 Round of 16	Lazio	2–1	Parma	Rome
21:15 CET (UTC+1)	Parolo 23'; Colombi 90' (o.g.)	Report	Mihăilă 83'	Stadium: Stadio Olimpico; Referee: Giovanni Ayroldi

== Statistics ==
=== Appearances and goals ===
No.	Pos	Nat	Player	Total		Serie A		Coppa Italia	
No.	Pos	Nat	Player	Apps	Goals	Apps	Goals	Apps	Goals
Goalkeepers
1	GK	(Italy) ITA	Luigi Sepe	37	0	36	0	1	0
34	GK	(Italy) ITA	Simone Colombi	4	0	2	0	2	0
Defenders
2	DF	(Italy) ITA	Simone Iacoponi	18	0	13+3	0	2	0
3	DF	(Italy) ITA	Giuseppe Pezzella	24	1	21+3	1	0	0
4	DF	(Hungary) HUN	Botond Balogh	4	0	1+2	0	1	0
5	DF	(Italy) ITA	Andrea Conti	11	0	9+2	0	0	0
7	DF	(Sweden) SWE	Riccardo Gagliolo	30	2	22+6	2	1+1	0
13	DF	(Italy) ITA	Mattia Bani	17	0	14+1	0	2	0
16	DF	(France) FRA	Vincent Laurini	14	0	10+4	0	0	0
20	DF	(Greece) GRE	Vasilis Zagaritis	2	0	0+2	0	0	0
22	DF	(Portugal) POR	Bruno Alves	19	1	18+1	1	0	0
24	DF	(Venezuela) VEN	Yordan Osorio	24	0	21+2	0	1	0
29	DF	(Belgium) BEL	Daan Dierckx	8	0	6+1	0	1	0
30	DF	(Argentina) ARG	Lautaro Valenti	12	0	6+5	0	0+1	0
42	DF	(Belgium) BEL	Maxime Busi	26	0	11+13	0	2	0
Midfielders
8	MF	(Italy) ITA	Alberto Grassi	23	0	13+10	0	0	0
14	MF	(Slovenia) SLO	Jasmin Kurtić	36	4	31+3	4	2	0
15	MF	(Uruguay) URU	Gastón Brugman	28	1	21+5	1	1+1	0
18	MF	(France) FRA	Wylan Cyprien	15	0	2+11	0	2	0
19	MF	(Switzerland) SUI	Simon Sohm	21	1	8+10	1	2+1	0
23	MF	(Brazil) BRA	Hernani	35	7	27+6	7	1+1	0
32	MF	(Argentina) ARG	Juan Brunetta	14	3	4+8	1	2	2
33	MF	(Slovakia) SVK	Juraj Kucka	28	7	28	7	0	0
37	MF	(Ivory Coast) CIV	Drissa Camara	3	0	0+1	0	0+2	0
39	MF	(Hungary) HUN	Márk Kosznovszky	1	0	1	0	0	0
41	MF	(Italy) ITA	Hans Nicolussi	2	0	0	0	2	0
Forwards
9	FW	(Italy) ITA	Graziano Pellè	13	1	6+7	1	0	0
10	FW	(France) FRA	Yann Karamoh	26	4	16+8	2	2	2
11	FW	(Denmark) DEN	Andreas Cornelius	30	1	21+8	1	1	0
17	FW	(Netherlands) NED	Joshua Zirkzee	4	0	0+4	0	0	0
21	FW	(Italy) ITA	Gabriele Artistico	1	0	0	0	0+1	0
27	FW	(Ivory Coast) CIV	Gervinho	27	5	25+2	5	0	0
28	FW	(Romania) ROU	Valentin Mihăilă	17	4	4+12	3	1	1
35	FW	(Ivory Coast) CIV	Chaka Traorè	4	0	0+3	0	0+1	0
45	FW	(Italy) ITA	Roberto Inglese	14	0	6+8	0	0	0
93	FW	(Italy) ITA	Mattia Sprocati	3	0	0+1	0	1+1	0
98	FW	(Romania) ROU	Dennis Man	14	2	6+8	2	0	0
Players transferred out during the season
5	MF	(Italy) ITA	Matteo Scozzarella	5	0	3	0	0+2	0
17	MF	(Italy) ITA	Jacopo Dezi	4	0	1+1	0	1+1	0
21	DF	(Albania) ALB	Kastriot Dermaku	2	0	1+1	0	0	0
26	FW	(Italy) ITA	Luca Siligardi	2	0	0+2	0	0	0
36	DF	(Italy) ITA	Matteo Darmian	3	0	2+1	0	0	0
46	GK	(Italy) ITA	Fabrizio Alastra	0	0	0	0	0	0
99	FW	(Italy) ITA	Andrea Adorante	4	1	0+1	0	1+2	1

Last updated: 22 May 2021
Source: Competitions

=== Goalscorers ===
As of 15 February 2021.

Rank	No.	Pos	Nat	Name	Serie A	Coppa Italia	Total
1	27	FW	(Ivory Coast)	Gervinho	4	0	4
1	33	MF	(Slovakia)	Juraj Kucka	4	0	4
3	10	FW	(France)	Yann Karamoh	1	2	3
3	23	MF	(Brazil)	Hernani	3	0	3
5	14	MF	(Slovenia)	Jasmin Kurtić	2	0	2
5	32	MF	(Argentina)	Juan Brunetta	0	2	2
7	7	DF	(Sweden)	Riccardo Gagliolo	1	0	1
7	28	MF	(Romania)	Valentin Mihăilă	0	1	1
7	99	DF	(Italy)	Andrea Adorante	0	1	1
Totals					15	6	21
