= 2019–20 Parma Calcio 1913 season =

Parma
2019–20 season
- President: Pietro Pizzarotti
- Manager: Roberto D'Aversa
- Stadium: Stadio Ennio Tardini
- Serie A: 11th
- Coppa Italia: Round of 16
- Top goalscorer: League: Andreas Cornelius (12); All: Andreas Cornelius (12)
| Home colours | Away colours | Third colours |

The 2019–20 Parma Calcio 1913 season was the club's second consecutive season back in Serie A, following their promotion from Serie B at the end of the 2017–18 season. The club competed in Serie A and the Coppa Italia.

== Players ==
=== Squad information ===
As of 9 February 2020
Appearances include league matches only

| No. | Name | Nat | Position(s) | Date of birth (age) | Signed from | Signed in | Contract ends | Apps. | Goals | Notes |
Goalkeepers
| 1 | Luigi Sepe | (Italy) | GK | 8 May 1991 (age 34) | (Italy) Napoli | 2018 | 2024 | 58 | 0 | |
| 34 | Simone Colombi | (Italy) | GK | 1 July 1991 (age 34) | (Italy) Carpi | 2019 | 2022 | 2 | 0 | |
Defenders
| 2 | Simone Iacoponi | (Italy) | CB / RB | 30 April 1987 (age 38) | (Italy) Virtus Entella | 2017 | 2019 | 119 | 4 | Vice-captain |
| 3 | Kastriot Dermaku | (Albania) | CB | 15 January 1992 (age 34) | (Italy) Cosenza | 2019 | 2023 | 8 | 0 | |
| 16 | Vincent Laurini | (France) | RB / LB | 10 June 1989 (age 36) | (Italy) Fiorentina | 2019 | 2022 | 6 | 0 | |
| 22 | Bruno Alves | (Portugal) | CB | 27 November 1981 (age 44) | (Scotland) Rangers | 2018 | 2020 | 52 | 4 | |
| 28 | Riccardo Gagliolo | (Sweden) | CB / LB | 28 April 1990 (age 35) | (Italy) Carpi | 2017 | 2021 | 91 | 8 | |
| 36 | Matteo Darmian | (Italy) | RB | 2 December 1989 (age 36) | (England) Manchester United | 2019 | 2023 | 19 | 0 | |
| 97 | Giuseppe Pezzella | (Italy) | LB | 29 November 1997 (age 28) | (Italy) Udinese | 2019 | 2020 | 13 | 0 | |
Midfielders
| 8 | Alberto Grassi | (Italy) | CM | 7 March 1995 (age 30) | (Italy) Napoli | 2018 | 2024 | 17 | 1 | |
| 10 | Hernani | (Brazil) | DM / CM / LM | 27 March 1994 (age 31) | (Russia) Zenit Saint Petersburg | 2019 | 2020 | 22 | 0 | Loan |
| 15 | Gastón Brugman | (Uruguay) | CM / DM / AM | 7 September 1992 (age 33) | (Italy) Pescara | 2019 | 2022 | 13 | 0 | |
| 17 | Antonino Barillà | (Italy) | CM | 1 April 1988 (age 37) | (Italy) Trapani | 2017 | 2022 | 73 | 8 | |
| 19 | Jasmin Kurtić | (Slovenia) | CM / AM | 10 January 1989 (age 37) | (Italy) SPAL | 2020 | 2020 | 5 | 0 | Loan |
| 21 | Matteo Scozzarella | (Italy) | DM / CM | 5 June 1988 (age 37) | (Italy) Trapani | 2017 | 2020 | 78 | 0 | |
| 33 | Juraj Kucka | (Slovakia) | CM | 26 February 1987 (age 38) | (Turkey) Trabzonspor | 2019 | 2022 | 36 | 7 | |
| 44 | Dejan Kulusevski | (Sweden) | CM / RM / LM | 25 April 2000 (age 25) | (Italy) Atalanta | 2019 | 2020 | 22 | 5 | Loan |
Forwards
| 7 | Yann Karamoh | (France) | LW / CF / RW | 8 July 1998 (age 27) | (Italy) Internazionale | 2019 | 2020 | 5 | 1 | Loan |
| 9 | Roberto Inglese | (Italy) | ST | 12 November 1991 (age 34) | (Italy) Napoli | 2018 | 2020 | 36 | 11 | Loan |
| 11 | Andreas Cornelius | (Denmark) | CF | 16 March 1993 (age 32) | (Italy) Atalanta | 2019 | 2021 | 16 | 8 | Loan |
| 20 | Gianluca Caprari | (Italy) | SS / AM / LW | 30 July 1993 (age 32) | (Italy) Sampdoria | 2020 | 2020 | 2 | 0 | Loan |
| 26 | Luca Siligardi | (Italy) | RW / LW / ST | 26 January 1988 (age 38) | (Italy) Hellas Verona | 2017 | 2022 | 50 | 2 | |
| 27 | Gervinho | (Ivory Coast) | LW / RW / ST | 27 May 1987 (age 38) | Hebei China Fortune | 2018 | 2021 | 47 | 15 | Captain |
| 93 | Mattia Sprocati | (Italy) | RW / LW / AM | 28 April 1993 (age 32) | (Italy) Lazio | 2018 | | 32 | 2 | |
Players transferred during the season
| 5 | Pepín | (Equatorial Guinea) | CM / DM / AM | 14 August 1996 (age 29) | (Italy) Pescara | 2019 | | 2 | 0 | Loan |
| 23 | Marcello Gazzola | (Italy) | RB | 3 April 1985 (age 40) | (Italy) Sassuolo | 2018 | 2020 | 39 | 1 | |
| 30 | Fabio Ceravolo | (Italy) | ST | 5 March 1987 (age 38) | (Italy) Benevento | 2017 | 2021 | 43 | 9 | |
| 32 | Luca Rigoni | (Italy) | CM / RM / DM / AM | 7 December 1984 (age 41) | (Italy) Genoa | 2018 | 2020 | 23 | 2 | |
| 53 | Fabrizio Alastra | (Italy) | GK | 1 October 1997 (age 28) | (Italy) Palermo | 2019 | 2022 | 0 | 0 | |

== Transfers ==
=== In ===
| Date | Pos. | Player | Age | Moving from | Fee | Notes | Source |
|---|---|---|---|---|---|---|---|
| 8 July 2019 | DF | (France) Vincent Laurini | 30 | (Italy) Fiorentina | Undisclosed | | |
| 10 July 2019 | MF | (Italy) Alberto Grassi | 24 | (Italy) Napoli | €11M | Fee shared with Sepe | |
| 10 July 2019 | GK | (Italy) Luigi Sepe | 28 | (Italy) Napoli | €11M | Fee shared with Grassi | |
| 2 September 2019 | DF | (Italy) Matteo Darmian | 29 | (England) Manchester United | €1.5M | | |

==== Loans in ====
| Date | Pos. | Player | Age | Moving from | Fee | Notes | Source |
|---|---|---|---|---|---|---|---|
| 12 July 2019 | MF | (Brazil) Hernani | 25 | (Russia) Zenit Saint Petersburg | Loan | Loan with an obligation to buy for €6M | |
| 16 July 2019 | FW | (Italy) Roberto Inglese | 27 | (Italy) Napoli | Loan | Loan with an obligation to buy | |
| 27 August 2019 | DF | (Italy) Giuseppe Pezzella | 21 | (Italy) Udinese | Loan | Loan with an obligation to buy for €4.5M | |
| 10 January 2020 | MF | (Slovenia) Jasmin Kurtić | 31 | (Italy) SPAL | Loan | Loan with an option to buy for €3.5M | |

=== Out ===
| Date | Pos. | Player | Age | Moving to | Fee | Notes | Source |

==== Loans out ====
| Date | Pos. | Player | Age | Moving to | Fee | Notes | Source |

== Pre-season and friendlies ==
| 27 July 2019 Friendly | Trabzonspor (Turkey) | 2–2 | (Italy) Parma | Ulm, Germany |
| 18:00 CEST (UTC+2) | Pereira 22'; Sari 64' | Report | Gervinho 16', 38'; Barillà (yellow card) 29'; Sepe (yellow card) 31'; Kulusevski (yellow card) 42' | Stadium: Donaustadion; Attendance: 2,000; Referee: Markus Waldl (Austria) |

| 30 July 2019 Friendly | Micheldorf (Austria) | 0–4 | (Italy) Parma | Micheldorf, Austria |
| 19:00 CEST (UTC+2) | | Report | Gervinho 16'; Hernani 34'; Scaglia 53'; Sprocati 75' | Stadium: Cool & Fair Arena; Attendance: 500; Referee: Robert Platzer (Austria) |

| 3 August 2019 Friendly | Burnley (England) | 2–0 | (Italy) Parma | Burnley, England |
| 16:00 CEST (UTC+2) | Rodriguez 52', 56' | Report | | Stadium: Turf Moor; Attendance: 4,846; Referee: Paul Tierney (England) |

| 10 August 2019 Friendly | Parma (Italy) | 2–1 | (Italy) Sampdoria | Parma, Italy |
| 20:30 CEST (UTC+2) | Inglese 22'; Sprocati 79' | Report | Ramírez 6' | Stadium: Stadio Ennio Tardini; Attendance: 2,715; Referee: Matteo Gariglio (Italy) |

== Competitions ==
=== Serie A ===
==== League table ====
| Pos | Team | Pld | W | D | L | GF | GA | GD | Pts |
|---|---|---|---|---|---|---|---|---|---|
| 9 | Hellas Verona | 38 | 12 | 13 | 13 | 47 | 51 | −4 | 49 (Note: Positions determined by head-to-head points: Hellas Verona: 10 pts; Fiorentina: 5 pts; Parma: 1 pt.) |
| 10 | Fiorentina | 38 | 12 | 13 | 13 | 51 | 48 | +3 | 49 |
| 11 | Parma | 38 | 14 | 7 | 17 | 56 | 57 | −1 | 49 |
| 12 | Bologna | 38 | 12 | 11 | 15 | 52 | 65 | −13 | 47 |
| 13 | Udinese | 38 | 12 | 9 | 17 | 37 | 51 | −14 | 45 (Note: Udinese finished ahead of Cagliari on head-to-head points: Udinese 2–1 Cagliari, Cagliari 0–1 Udinese.) |

Source: Serie A, Soccerway
Rules for classification: 1) Points; 2) Head-to-head points; 3) Head-to-head goal difference; 4) Goal difference; 5) Goals scored; 6) Draw. (Note: Head-to-head record is used only after all the matches between the teams in question have been played)

==== Results summary ====
| Overall | | | | | | | | Home | | | | | | Away | | | | | |
| Pld | W | D | L | GF | GA | GD | Pts | W | D | L | GF | GA | GD | W | D | L | GF | GA | GD |
|---|---|---|---|---|---|---|---|---|---|---|---|---|---|---|---|---|---|---|---|
| 38 | 14 | 7 | 17 | 56 | 57 | −1 | 49 | 7 | 2 | 10 | 26 | 24 | +2 | 7 | 5 | 7 | 30 | 33 | −3 |

Last updated: 2 August 2020.
Source: Competitive matches

==== Results by round ====
| Round | 1 | 2 | 3 | 4 | 5 | 6 | 7 | 8 | 9 | 10 | 11 | 12 | 13 | 14 | 15 | 16 | 17 | 18 | 19 | 20 | 21 | 22 | 23 | 24 | 25 | 26 | 27 | 28 | 29 | 30 | 31 | 32 | 33 | 34 | 35 | 36 | 37 | 38 |
|---|---|---|---|---|---|---|---|---|---|---|---|---|---|---|---|---|---|---|---|---|---|---|---|---|---|---|---|---|---|---|---|---|---|---|---|---|---|---|
| Ground | H | A | H | A | H | H | A | H | A | H | A | H | A | H | A | A | H | A | H | A | H | A | H | A | A | H | A | H | A | H | A | H | A | H | H | A | H | A |
| Result | L | W | L | L | W | W | L | W | D | L | D | W | D | L | W | W | D | L | W | L | W | D | L | W | D | L | W | L | L | L | L | D | L | L | W | W | L | W |
| Position | 18 | 9 | 15 | 15 | 13 | 9 | 12 | 8 | 8 | 10 | 10 | 8 | 8 | 8 | 8 | 7 | 7 | 7 | 7 | 7 | 7 | 7 | 9 | 7 | 9 | 9 | 7 | 8 | 10 | 12 | 12 | 12 | 12 | 14 | 10 | 11 | 11 | 11 |

Updated to match(es) played on 2 August 2020. Source: Competitive matches
A = Away; H = Home; W = Win; D = Draw; L = Loss

==== Matches ====
| 24 August 2019 1 | Parma | 0–1 | Juventus | Parma |
| 18:00 CEST (UTC+02:00) | Kulusevski (yellow card) 27'; Hernani (yellow card) 45' | Report | Chiellini 21'; Khedira (yellow card) 53'; Bernardeschi (yellow card) 88'; Pjanić (yellow card) 90+1' | Stadium: Stadio Ennio Tardini; Attendance: 20,073; Referee: Fabio Maresca |

| 1 September 2019 2 | Udinese | 1–3 | Parma | Udine |
| 20:45 CEST (UTC+02:00) | Lasagna 17'; Teodorczyk (yellow card) 90+3' | Report | Grassi (yellow card) 6'; Gervinho 43'; Gagliolo 59'; Inglese 75'; Barillà (yellow card) 81'; Hernani (yellow card) 86' | Stadium: Dacia Arena; Attendance: 20,410; Referee: Marco Piccinini |

| 15 September 2019 3 | Parma | 1–3 | Cagliari | Parma |
| 15:00 CEST (UTC+02:00) | Barillà 58' | Report | Ceppitelli (yellow card) 16', (goal) 23', 39'; João Pedro (yellow card) 42'; Nández (yellow card) 56'; Pellegrini (yellow card) 62'; Simeone 77'; Castro (yellow card) 86' | Stadium: Stadio Ennio Tardini; Attendance: 14,068; Referee: Fabrizio Pasqua |

| 22 September 2019 4 | Lazio | 2–0 | Parma | Rome |
| 20:45 CEST (UTC+02:00) | Immobile 8'; Lucas (yellow card) 47'; Marušić 67' | Report | Kulusevski (yellow card) 24'; Barillà (yellow card) 61'; Iacoponi (yellow card) 90+1' | Stadium: Stadio Olimpico; Attendance: 20,000; Referee: Rosario Abisso |

| 25 September 2019 5 | Parma | 1–0 | Sassuolo | Parma |
| 21:00 CEST (UTC+02:00) | Gervinho (yellow card) 20'; Gagliolo (yellow card) 89'; Iacoponi (yellow card) 90+3'; Bourabia 90+5' (o.g.) | Report | Obiang (yellow card) 73' | Stadium: Stadio Ennio Tardini; Attendance: 14,569; Referee: Livio Marinelli |

| 30 September 2019 6 | Parma | 3–2 | Torino | Parma |
| 20:45 CEST (UTC+02:00) | Kulusevski 2'; Laurini (yellow card) 41'; Cornelius 45+3'; Hernani (yellow card) 68'; Inglese 88' | Report | Ansaldi 12'; Bremer (yellow card) 21' (yellow-red card) 29'; Rincón (yellow card) 35'; Belotti 43' (pen.) | Stadium: Stadio Ennio Tardini; Attendance: 15,001; Referee: Federico La Penna |

| 5 October 2019 7 | SPAL | 1–0 | Parma | Ferrara |
| 15:00 CEST (UTC+02:00) | Espeto (yellow card) 17' (yellow-red card) 70'; Petagna 31', (yellow card) 45+3'; Kurtić (yellow card) 89'; Sala (yellow card) 90' | Report | Hernani (yellow card) 45+3'; Gagliolo (yellow card) 82' | Stadium: Stadio Paolo Mazza; Attendance: 11,776; Referee: Marco Guida |

| 20 October 2019 8 | Parma | 5–1 | Genoa | Parma |
| 18:00 CEST (UTC+02:00) | Scozzarella (yellow card) 28'; Kucka 38'; Cornelius 42', 45+1', 50'; Kulusevski 79' | Report | Radovanović (yellow card) 23'; Pinamonti 52'; Kouamé (yellow card) 83' | Stadium: Stadio Ennio Tardini; Attendance: 15,299; Referee: Paolo Valeri |

| 26 October 2019 9 | Internazionale | 2–2 | Parma | Milan |
| 18:00 CEST (UTC+02:00) | Barella (yellow card) 13'; Candreva 23', (yellow card) 44'; Lukaku 51'; Esposito (yellow card) 81' | Report | Karamoh 26'; Gervinho 30'; Sepe (yellow card) 88'; Darmian (yellow card) 90' | Stadium: San Siro; Attendance: 67,076; Referee: Daniele Chiffi |

| 29 October 2019 10 | Parma | 0–1 | Hellas Verona | Parma |
| 19:00 CET (UTC+01:00) | Gervinho (yellow card) 90+1' | Report | Lazović 10'; Kumbulla (yellow card) 27'; Verre (yellow card) 36'; Amrabat (yellow card) 51'; Veloso (yellow card) 73'; Zaccagni (yellow card) 90+1' | Stadium: Stadio Ennio Tardini; Attendance: 14,638; Referee: Gianluca Manganiello |

| 3 November 2019 11 | Fiorentina | 1–1 | Parma | Florence |
| 18:00 CET (UTC+01:00) | Dalbert (yellow card) 55'; Castrovilli 67'; Pulgar (yellow card) 71' | Report | Pezzella (yellow card) 28'; Darmian (yellow card) 39'; Gervinho 40' | Stadium: Stadio Artemio Franchi; Attendance: 32,479; Referee: Luca Pairetto |

| 10 November 2019 12 | Parma | 2–0 | Roma | Parma |
| 18:00 CET (UTC+01:00) | Scozzarella (yellow card) 24'; Sprocati 68'; Barillà (yellow card) 75'; Hernani (yellow card) 76'; Cornelius 90+3' | Report | Zaniolo (yellow card) 11'; Kluivert (yellow card) 78' | Stadium: Stadio Ennio Tardini; Attendance: 18,532; Referee: Michael Fabbri |

| 24 November 2019 13 | Bologna | 2–2 | Parma | Bologna |
| 12:30 CET (UTC+01:00) | Tomiyasu (yellow card) 38'; Palacio 40'; Džemaili 90+5' | Report | Kulusevski 17'; Gagliolo (yellow card) 38'; Barillà (yellow card) 56'; Iacoponi 71'; Grassi (yellow card) 75' | Stadium: Stadio Renato Dall'Ara; Attendance: 21,419; Referee: Rosario Abisso |

| 1 December 2019 14 | Parma | 0–1 | Milan | Parma |
| 15:00 CET (UTC+01:00) | Iacoponi (yellow card) 61' | Report | Bennacer (yellow card) 58'; Hernandez 88', (yellow card) 89'; G. Donnarumma (yellow card) 90' | Stadium: Stadio Ennio Tardini; Attendance: 18,431; Referee: Paolo Valeri |

| 8 December 2019 15 | Sampdoria | 0–1 | Parma | Genoa |
| 18:00 CET (UTC+01:00) | Vieira (yellow card) 50'; Gabbiadini (yellow card) 72'; Thorsby (yellow card) 89' | Report | Kucka 21'; Cornelius (yellow card) 35'; Dermaku (yellow card) 75' | Stadium: Stadio Luigi Ferraris; Attendance: 19,516; Referee: Rosario Abisso |

| 14 December 2019 16 | Napoli | 1–2 | Parma | Naples |
| 18:00 CET (UTC+01:00) | Milik 64', (yellow card) 81'; Mertens (yellow card) 79' | Report | Kulusevski 4'; Gervinho (yellow card) 9', (goal) 90+3'; Gagliolo (yellow card) 63' | Stadium: Stadio San Paolo; Attendance: 27,487; Referee: Marco Di Bello |

| 22 December 2019 17 | Parma | 1–1 | Brescia | Parma |
| 15:00 CET (UTC+01:00) | Gagliolo (yellow card) 69'; Hernani (yellow card) 69'; Grassi 90+2', (yellow card) 90+3' | Report | Cistana (yellow card) 28'; Balotelli 72'; Matějů (yellow card) 75' | Stadium: Stadio Ennio Tardini; Attendance: 16,686; Referee: Francesco Fourneau |

| 6 January 2020 18 | Atalanta | 5–0 | Parma | Bergamo |
| 15:00 CET (UTC+01:00) | Gómez 11', (yellow card) 29'; Freuler 34', (yellow card) 70'; Gosens 43'; Iličić 60', 71' | Report | Barillà (yellow card) 8'; Pezzella (yellow card) 27'; Kucka (yellow card) 57'; Hernani (yellow card) 71' | Stadium: Gewiss Stadium; Attendance: 19,217; Referee: Fabrizio Pasqua |

| 13 January 2020 19 | Parma | 2–0 | Lecce | Parma |
| 20:45 CET (UTC+01:00) | Hernani (yellow card) 33'; Iacoponi 57'; Inglese (yellow card) 63'; Cornelius 72'; Alves (yellow card) 80'; Darmian (yellow card) 82' | Report | Petriccione (yellow card) 41' | Stadium: Stadio Ennio Tardini; Attendance: 15,258; Referee: Michael Fabbri |

| 19 January 2020 20 | Juventus | 2–1 | Parma | Turin |
| 20:45 CET (UTC+01:00) | Ronaldo 43', 58' | Report | Cornelius 55'; Kurtić (yellow card) 71' | Stadium: Allianz Stadium; Attendance: 37,790; Referee: Marco Di Bello |

| 26 January 2020 21 | Parma | 2–0 | Udinese | Parma |
| 15:00 CET (UTC+01:00) | Gagliolo 19'; Kulusevski 34'; Hernani (yellow card) 59'; Laurini (yellow card) 68' | Report | Troost-Ekong (yellow card) 30'; Mandragora (yellow card) 45'; Becão (yellow card) 49' | Stadium: Stadio Ennio Tardini; Attendance: 14,250; Referee: Simone Sozza |

| 1 February 2020 22 | Cagliari | 2–2 | Parma | Cagliari |
| 18:00 CET (UTC+01:00) | João Pedro 19'; Simeone 54'; Cigarini (yellow card) 69'; Nández (yellow card) 77'; Nainggolan (yellow card) 87' | Report | Darmian (yellow card) 34'; Kucka 42'; Gagliolo (yellow card) 52'; Cornelius 90+4' | Stadium: Sardegna Arena; Attendance: 16,051; Referee: Massimiliano Irrati |

| 9 February 2020 23 | Parma | 0–1 | Lazio | Parma |
| 18:00 CET (UTC+01:00) | Kucka (yellow card) 35'; Caprari (yellow card) 67'; Alves (yellow card) 90+1' | Report | Caicedo 41', (yellow card) 56'; Lucas (yellow card) 58' | Stadium: Stadio Ennio Tardini; Attendance: 17,859; Referee: Marco Di Bello |

| 16 February 2020 24 | Sassuolo | 0–1 | Parma | Reggio Emilia |
| 15:00 CET (UTC+01:00) | Marlon (yellow card) 26'; Berardi (yellow card) 58'; Locatelli (yellow card) 77'; Bourabia (yellow card) 81'; Ferrari (yellow card) 90+4' | Report | Gervinho 25'; Laurini (yellow card) 72'; Grassi (yellow card) 87'; Brugman (yellow card) 90' | Stadium: Mapei Stadium – Città del Tricolore; Attendance: 10,000; Referee: Maurizio Mariani |

| 8 March 2020 26 | Parma | 0–1 | SPAL | Parma |
| 13:45 CET (UTC+01:00) | Brugman (yellow card) 62'; Gagliolo (yellow card) 90+5' | Report | Felipe (yellow card) 39'; Petagna 71' (pen.) | Stadium: Stadio Ennio Tardini; Attendance: 0 Referee: Luca Pairetto |
Note: Match was initially postponed to 13 May from its original date of 1 March due to concerns over the COVID-19 pandemic, but was later moved to 8 March to be played behind closed doors.

| 20 June 2020 25 | Torino | 1–1 | Parma | Turin |
| 19:30 CEST (UTC+02:00) | Nkoulou 15'; Rincón (yellow card) 62' | Report | Kucka 31'; Iacoponi (yellow card) 47'; Brugman (yellow card) 87' | Stadium: Stadio Olimpico Grande Torino; Attendance: 0 Referee: Massimiliano Irrati |
Note: Match was initially postponed to 11 March, from its original date of 23 February due to concerns over the COVID-19 pandemic, but was later moved to 18 March, then to 20 June, to be played behind closed doors. All subsequent matches were also shuffled to allow for this accommodation. On 9 March, all sports events in Italy were suspended until 3 April. This was the first match played since the COVID-19 pandemic lockdown in Italy.

| 23 June 2020 27 | Genoa | 1–4 | Parma | Genoa |
| 21:45 CEST (UTC+02:00) | Cassata (yellow card) 32'; Falque 59' (pen.) | Report | Cornelius 18', 33', 53'; Iacoponi (yellow card) 29'; Laurini (yellow card) 59'; Kulusevski 87' | Stadium: Stadio Luigi Ferraris; Attendance: 0 Referee: Piero Giacomelli |
Note: Match was postponed to 14 March, then to 23 June, from its original date of 8 March due to schedule shuffling to allow for Parma vs SPAL to be played following its previous postponement due to concerns over the COVID-19 pandemic.

| 28 June 2020 28 | Parma | 1–2 | Internazionale | Parma |
| 21:45 CEST (UTC+02:00) | Gervinho 15'; Dermaku (yellow card) 30'; Kucka (yellow card) 49', (red card) 85'; Kurtić (yellow card) 88' | Report | Martínez (yellow card) 28'; Gagliardini (yellow card) 49'; Berni (red card) 69'; Godín (yellow card) 71'; De Vrij 84'; Bastoni 87'; Moses (yellow card) 90+3' | Stadium: Stadio Ennio Tardini; Attendance: 0 Referee: Fabio Maresca |

| 1 July 2020 29 | Hellas Verona | 3–2 | Parma | Verona |
| 21:45 CEST (UTC+02:00) | Di Carmine 45+2' (pen.); Zaccagni 54'; Empereur (yellow card) 54'; Pessina 81', (yellow card) 90+4' | Report | Barillà (yellow card) 6'; Kulusevski 14'; Iacoponi (yellow card) 15'; Hernani (yellow card) 38'; Gagliolo 64' | Stadium: Stadio Marc'Antonio Bentegodi; Attendance: 0 Referee: Paolo Valeri |

| 5 July 2020 30 | Parma | 1–2 | Fiorentina | Parma |
| 19:30 CEST (UTC+02:00) | Brugman (yellow card) 38'; Kulusevski (yellow card) 39'; Kucka (yellow card) 41', (goal) 49' (pen.); Kurtić (yellow card) 89' | Report | Pulgar 19' (pen.), 31' (pen.); Venuti (yellow card) 32'; Pezzella (yellow card) 49'; Igor (yellow card) 52'; Milenković (yellow card) 63'; Cutrone (yellow card) 79'; Sottil (yellow card) 90+5' | Stadium: Stadio Ennio Tardini; Attendance: 0 Referee: Rosario Abisso |

| 8 July 2020 31 | Roma | 2–1 | Parma | Rome |
| 21:45 CEST (UTC+02:00) | Cristante (yellow card) 9'; Mkhitaryan 43', (yellow card) 78'; Peres (yellow card) 49'; Veretout 57'; Diawara (yellow card) 71'; Ibañez (yellow card) 90+6' | Report | Kucka 9' (pen.); Kurtić (yellow card) 85' | Stadium: Stadio Olimpico; Attendance: 0 Referee: Michael Fabbri |

| 12 July 2020 32 | Parma | 2–2 | Bologna | Parma |
| 19:30 CEST (UTC+02:00) | Alves (yellow card) 30'; Kurtić 90+3'; Inglese 90+5' | Report | Danilo 3'; Soriano 16'; Barrow (yellow card) 75' | Stadium: Stadio Ennio Tardini; Attendance: 0 Referee: Maurizio Mariani |

| 15 July 2020 33 | Milan | 3–1 | Parma | Milan |
| 19:30 CEST (UTC+02:00) | Conti (yellow card) 33'; Kessié 55'; Romagnoli 59'; Çalhanoğlu 77' | Report | Grassi (yellow card) 33'; Kurtić 44'; Darmian (yellow card) 65' | Stadium: San Siro; Attendance: 0 Referee: Massimiliano Irrati |

| 19 July 2020 34 | Parma | 2–3 | Sampdoria | Parma |
| 17:15 CEST (UTC+02:00) | Gervinho 18'; Bereszyński 40' (o.g.) | Report | Chabot 48'; Ekdal (yellow card) 52'; Quagliarella 69'; Bonazzoli 78' | Stadium: Stadio Ennio Tardini; Attendance: 0 Referee: Gianpaolo Calvarese |

| 22 July 2020 35 | Parma | 2–1 | Napoli | Parma |
| 19:30 CEST (UTC+02:00) | Caprari 45+3' (pen.); Grassi (yellow card) 53'; Kulusevski 87' (pen.); Brugman (yellow card) 90+2'; Iacoponi (yellow card) 90+3' | Report | Lozano (yellow card) 35'; Insigne 54' (pen.) | Stadium: Stadio Ennio Tardini; Attendance: 0 Referee: Antonio Giua |

| 25 July 2020 36 | Brescia | 1–2 | Parma | Brescia |
| 17:15 CEST (UTC+02:00) | Torregrossa (yellow card) 20'; Dessena (yellow card) 29', (goal) 62'; Matějů (yellow card) 45'; Papetti (yellow card) 90+2' | Report | Darmian 59'; Kulusevski 81' | Stadium: Stadio Mario Rigamonti; Attendance: 0 Referee: Lorenzo Maggioni |

| 28 July 2020 37 | Parma | 1–2 | Atalanta | Parma |
| 19:30 CEST (UTC+02:00) | Darmian (yellow card) 19'; Kulusevski 43'; Kucka (yellow card) 45+3' | Report | Šutalo (yellow card) 6'; Malinovskyi 70'; Gómez 84' | Stadium: Stadio Ennio Tardini; Attendance: 0 Referee: Luca Pairetto |

| 2 August 2020 38 | Lecce | 3–4 | Parma | Lecce |
| 20:45 CEST (UTC+02:00) | Barák 40'; Meccariello 45'; Lapadula 69' | Report | Lucioni 11' (o.g.); Caprari 24'; Kurtić (yellow card) 34'; Alves (yellow card) 45'; Cornelius 52'; Inglese 67' | Stadium: Stadio Via del Mare; Attendance: 0 Referee: Maurizio Mariani |

=== Coppa Italia ===
| 17 August 2019 Third round | Parma | 3–1 | Venezia | Parma |
| 18:00 CEST (UTC+02:00) | Gervinho 9', 72'; Iacoponi 22'; Alves (yellow card) 61'; Grassi (yellow card) 86' | Report | Aramu 24' (pen.); Bocalon (yellow card) 58' | Stadium: Stadio Ennio Tardini; Attendance: 5,449; Referee: Paolo Valeri |

| 5 December 2019 Fourth round | Parma | 2–1 | Frosinone | Parma |
| 18:00 CET (UTC+01:00) | Siligardi 20'; Hernani 90+2' (pen.) | Report | Trotta 71' | Stadium: Stadio Ennio Tardini; Attendance: 1,190; Referee: Federico Dionisi |

| 16 January 2020 Round of 16 | Parma | 0–2 | Roma | Parma |
| 21:15 CET (UTC+01:00) | Laurini (yellow card) 37'; Dermaku (yellow card) 56' | Report | Pellegrini 49', 76' (pen.), (yellow card) 57'; Ünder (yellow card) 54' | Stadium: Stadio Ennio Tardini; Attendance: 3,604; Referee: Luca Pairetto |

== Statistics ==
=== Appearances and goals ===
| No. | Pos | Nat | Player | Total | | Serie A | | Coppa Italia | |
| No. | Pos | Nat | Player | Apps | Goals | Apps | Goals | Apps | Goals |
Goalkeepers
| 1 | GK | (Italy) ITA | Luigi Sepe | 35 | 0 | 34 | 0 | 1 | 0 |
| 34 | GK | (Italy) ITA | Simone Colombi | 6 | 0 | 4 | 0 | 2 | 0 |
| 92 | GK | (Romania) ROU | Ionuț Radu | 0 | 0 | 0 | 0 | 0 | 0 |
Defenders
| 2 | DF | (Italy) ITA | Simone Iacoponi | 38 | 3 | 34+2 | 2 | 1+1 | 1 |
| 3 | DF | (Albania) ALB | Kastriot Dermaku | 19 | 0 | 10+6 | 0 | 2+1 | 0 |
| 5 | DF | (Italy) ITA | Vasco Regini | 2 | 0 | 0+2 | 0 | 0 | 0 |
| 16 | DF | (France) FRA | Vincent Laurini | 18 | 0 | 10+5 | 0 | 3 | 0 |
| 22 | DF | (Portugal) POR | Bruno Alves | 34 | 0 | 31+2 | 0 | 1 | 0 |
| 28 | DF | (Italy) ITA | Riccardo Gagliolo | 35 | 3 | 31+1 | 3 | 3 | 0 |
| 36 | DF | (Italy) ITA | Matteo Darmian | 34 | 1 | 30+3 | 1 | 0+1 | 0 |
| 97 | DF | (Italy) ITA | Giuseppe Pezzella | 24 | 0 | 8+14 | 0 | 2 | 0 |
Midfielders
| 8 | MF | (Italy) ITA | Alberto Grassi | 17 | 1 | 6+10 | 1 | 0+1 | 0 |
| 10 | MF | (Brazil) BRA | Hernani | 34 | 1 | 27+5 | 0 | 2 | 1 |
| 15 | MF | (Uruguay) URU | Gastón Brugman | 25 | 0 | 17+6 | 0 | 2 | 0 |
| 17 | MF | (Italy) ITA | Antonino Barillà | 29 | 1 | 20+6 | 1 | 3 | 0 |
| 19 | MF | (Slovenia) SVN | Jasmin Kurtić | 21 | 2 | 18+2 | 2 | 1 | 0 |
| 21 | MF | (Italy) ITA | Matteo Scozzarella | 17 | 0 | 12+4 | 0 | 1 | 0 |
| 33 | MF | (Slovakia) SVK | Juraj Kucka | 28 | 6 | 22+4 | 6 | 1+1 | 0 |
| 44 | MF | (Sweden) SWE | Dejan Kulusevski | 39 | 10 | 33+3 | 10 | 1+2 | 0 |
Forwards
| 7 | FW | (France) FRA | Yann Karamoh | 15 | 1 | 5+9 | 1 | 0+1 | 0 |
| 9 | FW | (Italy) ITA | Roberto Inglese | 19 | 4 | 8+9 | 4 | 1+1 | 0 |
| 11 | FW | (Denmark) DEN | Andreas Cornelius | 27 | 12 | 17+9 | 12 | 1 | 0 |
| 20 | FW | (Italy) ITA | Gianluca Caprari | 12 | 2 | 7+5 | 2 | 0 | 0 |
| 26 | FW | (Italy) ITA | Luca Siligardi | 14 | 1 | 3+9 | 0 | 2 | 1 |
| 27 | FW | (Ivory Coast) CIV | Gervinho | 32 | 9 | 27+4 | 7 | 1 | 2 |
| 88 | FW | (Italy) ITA | Andrea Adorante | 1 | 0 | 0 | 0 | 1 | 0 |
| 93 | FW | (Italy) ITA | Mattia Sprocati | 21 | 1 | 4+16 | 1 | 1 | 0 |
Players transferred out during the season
| 53 | GK | (Italy) ITA | Fabrizio Alastra | 0 | 0 | 0 | 0 | 0 | 0 |

Last updated: 2 August 2020
Source: Competitions

=== Goalscorers ===
| Rank | No. | Pos | Nat | Name | Serie A | Coppa Italia | Total |
|---|---|---|---|---|---|---|---|
| 1 | 11 | FW | (Denmark) | Andreas Cornelius | 11 | 0 | 11 |
| 2 | 44 | MF | (Sweden) | Dejan Kulusevski | 10 | 0 | 10 |
| 3 | 27 | FW | (Ivory Coast) | Gervinho | 7 | 2 | 9 |
| 4 | 33 | MF | (Slovenia) | Juraj Kucka | 6 | 0 | 6 |
| 5 | 2 | DF | (Italy) | Simone Iacoponi | 2 | 1 | 3 |
| 5 | 9 | FW | (Italy) | Roberto Inglese | 3 | 0 | 3 |
| 5 | 28 | DF | (Italy) | Riccardo Gagliolo | 3 | 0 | 3 |
| 8 | 19 | MF | (Italy) | Jasmin Kurtić | 2 | 0 | 2 |
| 9 | 7 | FW | (France) | Yann Karamoh | 1 | 0 | 1 |
| 9 | 8 | MF | (Italy) | Alberto Grassi | 1 | 0 | 1 |
| 9 | 10 | MF | (Brazil) | Hernani | 0 | 1 | 1 |
| 9 | 17 | MF | (Italy) | Antonino Barillà | 1 | 0 | 1 |
| 9 | 20 | FW | (Italy) | Gianluca Caprari | 1 | 0 | 1 |
| 9 | 26 | FW | (El Salvador) | Luca Siligardi | 0 | 1 | 1 |
| 9 | 36 | DF | (Italy) | Matteo Darmian | 1 | 0 | 1 |
| 9 | 93 | FW | (Italy) | Mattia Sprocati | 1 | 0 | 1 |
| Own goal | | | | | 2 | 0 | 2 |
| Totals | | | | | 52 | 5 | 57 |

Last updated: 28 July 2020

=== Clean sheets ===
| Rank | No. | Pos | Nat | Name | Serie A | Coppa Italia | Total |
|---|---|---|---|---|---|---|---|
| 1 | 1 | GK | (Italy) | Luigi Sepe | 5 | 0 | 5 |
| Totals | | | | | 5 | 0 | 5 |

Last updated: 9 February 2020

=== Disciplinary record ===
| No. | Pos | Nat | Name | Serie A | | | Coppa Italia | | | Total | | |
| No. | Pos | Nat | Name | Booked | (yellow card) (yellow-red card) | Sent off (straight red) | Booked | (yellow card) (yellow-red card) | Sent off (straight red) | Booked | (yellow card) (yellow-red card) | Sent off (straight red) |
| 1 | GK | (Italy) | Luigi Sepe | 1 | 0 | 0 | 0 | 0 | 0 | 1 | 0 | 0 |
| 2 | DF | (Italy) | Simone Iacoponi | 3 | 0 | 0 | 0 | 0 | 0 | 3 | 0 | 0 |
| 3 | DF | (Albania) | Kastriot Dermaku | 1 | 0 | 0 | 0 | 0 | 0 | 1 | 0 | 0 |
| 16 | DF | (France) | Vincent Laurini | 2 | 0 | 0 | 0 | 0 | 0 | 2 | 0 | 0 |
| 22 | DF | (Portugal) | Bruno Alves | 2 | 0 | 0 | 1 | 0 | 0 | 3 | 0 | 0 |
| 28 | DF | (Italy) | Riccardo Gagliolo | 6 | 0 | 0 | 0 | 0 | 0 | 6 | 0 | 0 |
| 36 | DF | (Italy) | Matteo Darmian | 4 | 0 | 0 | 0 | 0 | 0 | 4 | 0 | 0 |
| 97 | DF | (Italy) | Giuseppe Pezzella | 2 | 0 | 0 | 0 | 0 | 0 | 2 | 0 | 0 |
| 8 | MF | (Italy) | Alberto Grassi | 3 | 0 | 0 | 1 | 0 | 0 | 4 | 0 | 0 |
| 10 | MF | (Brazil) | Hernani | 9 | 0 | 0 | 0 | 0 | 0 | 9 | 0 | 0 |
| 17 | MF | (Italy) | Antonino Barillà | 5 | 0 | 0 | 0 | 0 | 0 | 5 | 0 | 0 |
| 19 | MF | (Slovenia) | Jasmin Kurtić | 1 | 0 | 0 | 0 | 0 | 0 | 1 | 0 | 0 |
| 21 | MF | (Italy) | Matteo Scozzarella | 2 | 0 | 0 | 0 | 0 | 0 | 2 | 0 | 0 |
| 33 | MF | (Slovenia) | Juraj Kucka | 2 | 0 | 0 | 0 | 0 | 0 | 2 | 0 | 0 |
| 44 | MF | (Sweden) | Dejan Kulusevski | 2 | 0 | 0 | 0 | 0 | 0 | 2 | 0 | 0 |
| 9 | FW | (Italy) | Roberto Inglese | 1 | 0 | 0 | 0 | 0 | 0 | 1 | 0 | 0 |
| 11 | FW | (Denmark) | Andreas Cornelius | 1 | 0 | 0 | 0 | 0 | 0 | 1 | 0 | 0 |
| 20 | FW | (Italy) | Gianluca Caprari | 1 | 0 | 0 | 0 | 0 | 0 | 1 | 0 | 0 |
| 27 | FW | (Ivory Coast) | Gervinho | 3 | 0 | 0 | 0 | 0 | 0 | 3 | 0 | 0 |
| Totals | | | | 51 | 0 | 0 | 2 | 0 | 0 | 53 | 0 | 0 |

Last updated: 9 February 2020
