= Washington Alves =

Brazilian footballer

Personal information
- Full name: Washington Geraldo Dias Alves
- Date of birth: 3 September 1949 (age 77)
- Place of birth: Barão de Cocais, Brazil
- Position: Central defender

Senior career*
Years	Team	Apps	(Gls)
1965–1966	Metalusina Esporte Clube		
1968–1971	Flamengo		
1972	Portuguesa		
1972	Colorado		
1972	América Mineiro	7	(0)
1973–1974	Bahia	6	(0)
1974	Botafogo		
1974–1976	Espinho (Note: The statistics for the 1975–76 season are unavailable.)	24	(3)
1976–1977	Varzim	18	(0)
1977–1978	Rio Ave	14	(3)
1978–1979	Varzim	23	(2)
1979–1980	Rio Ave	16	(0)
1980–1981	Lusitânia Lourosa		
1981–1984	Varzim	82	(3)
1984–1985	Famalicão	8	(0)
1985–1986	Paredes	5	(0)
Total		203	(11)

Managerial career
- 1990: Varzim
- 1992–1993: Varzim
- 1997: Tirsense
- 2017–2018: Trofense (assistant)
- * Club domestic league appearances and goals

Washington Geraldo Dias Alves (born 3 September 1949) is a Brazilian former footballer who played as a central defender. After he ended his playing career, he worked as a manager in the Portuguese lower leagues.

== Personal life ==
He played over ten years of his career in Portugal, where his children were born to a Portuguese mother. His sons Geraldo, Bruno, and Júlio have played football on the professional level. His brother, Geraldo Assoviador, was also a footballer, in the midfielder position.
