= José Machín =

Equatoguinean footballer (born 1996)

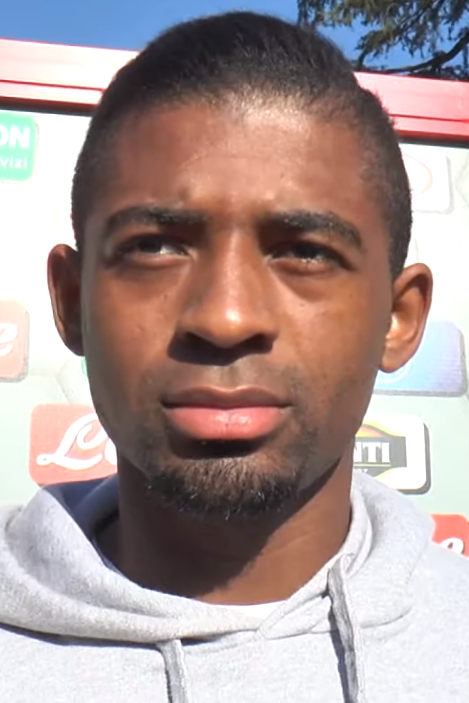
- Machín in an interview in 2020

Personal information
- Full name: José Ndong Machín Dicombo
- Date of birth: 14 August 1996 (age 30)
- Place of birth: Bata, Equatorial Guinea
- Height: 1.84 m (6 ft 0 in)
- Position: Attacking midfielder

Team information
- Current team: Sambenedettese

Youth career
- 2003–2004: La Floresta
- 2004–2008: Barcelona
- 2008–2009: La Floresta
- 2009–2010: Cambrils
- 2010–2012: Gimnàstic
- 2012–2015: Málaga
- 2015–2016: Roma

Senior career*
Years	Team	Apps	(Gls)
2014	Atlético Malagueño	2	(0)
2016–2018	Roma	0	(0)
2016–2017	→ Trapani (loan)	7	(0)
2017	→ Lugano (loan)	5	(0)
2017–2018	→ Brescia (loan)	21	(1)
2018	→ Pescara (loan)	11	(2)
2018–2019	Pescara	17	(1)
2019	→ Parma (loan)	2	(0)
2019–2020	Parma	0	(0)
2019–2020	→ Pescara (loan)	20	(7)
2020	→ Monza (loan)	3	(0)
2020–2025	Monza	73	(5)
2021	→ Pescara (loan)	19	(2)
2024–2025	→ Frosinone (loan)	5	(0)
2025	→ Cartagena (loan)	13	(1)
2025–2026	Vis Pesaro	22	(3)
2026–	Sambenedettese	0	(0)

International career^{‡}
2011	Equatorial Guinea U16		
2015	Equatorial Guinea U20		
2015–	Equatorial Guinea	23	(0)
- * Club domestic league appearances and goals as of 30 April 2026 ‡ National team caps and goals as of 20 November 2023

José Ndong Machín Dicombo (Spanish pronunciation: [xoˈse ma'tʃin]; born 14 August 1996), also known as Pepín ([peˈpin]), is an Equatoguinean professional footballer who plays as an attacking midfielder for Serie C club Sambenedettese and the Equatorial Guinea national team.

== Club career ==
=== Early career ===
Born in Bata, Equatorial Guinea, Machín moved to Spain and began his youth career with La Floresta in Tarragona. In the middle of 2004 he joined Barcelona's youth setup, and remained there the next four seasons. After returning to La Floresta for a year, Machín had stints at Cambrils, Gimnàstic de Tarragona, and Málaga.

Machín played twice for Atlético Malagueño, Málaga's reserve team, in the 2014–15 Tercera División, coming on as a late substitute in 2–0 home wins against Villacarrillo and Guadix.

=== Roma ===
On 30 January 2015, Machín transferred to Serie A club Roma. He became a starter in their Primavera (under-19) side, helping Roma win the 2015–16 Campionato Primavera. Machín also played friendly matches with the first team in the middle of 2015 and was an unused substitute in several 2015–16 Serie A matches.

On 5 August 2016, Machín was sent on loan to Serie B club Trapani, with whom he played nine games. In January 2017, he was sent on a six-month loan to Lugano in the Swiss Super League, and in July 2017 Roma sent Machín on loan to Brescia (July 2017).

=== Pescara ===
In January 2018, Machín was sent on loan to Pescara, who excersied the buyout option on 1 July 2018.

=== Parma ===
On 31 January 2019, he joined Parma on loan with a €2.5m obligation to buy. On 31 August 2019, Machín joined his former Serie B club Pescara on loan until 30 June 2020. He scored seven goals in 20 Serie B matches in the first half of the season.

=== Monza ===
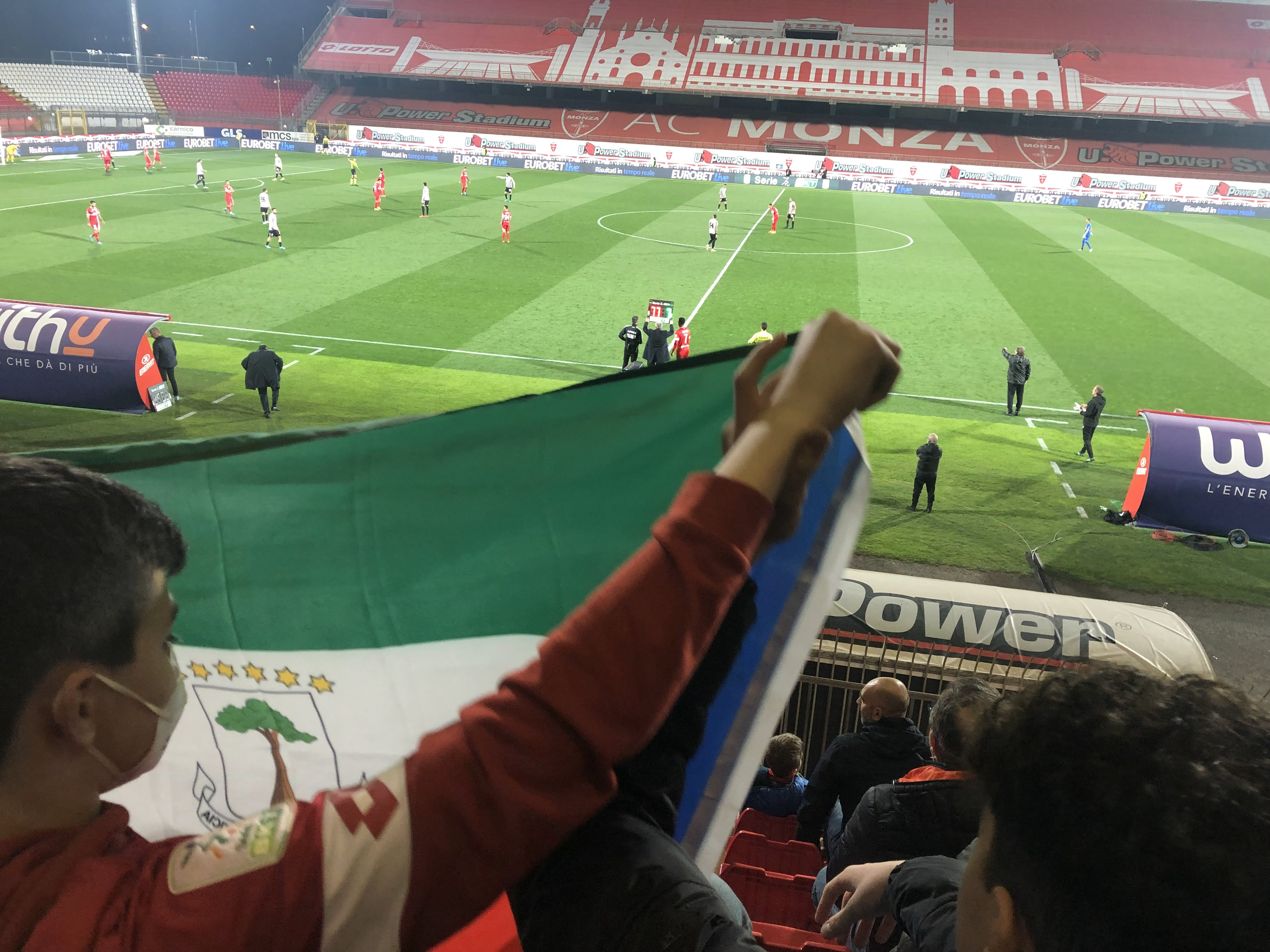
A Monza fan holding a flag of Equatorial Guinea in the foreground, with Machín entering the pitch in the background

On 31 January 2020, Machín moved on a six-month loan to Serie C club Monza, with an obligation to purchase at the end of the season if certain conditions were met. After gaining promotion to Serie B, he moved permanently to Monza, playing in the first half of the 2020–21 season. Machin moved back to Pescara on 15 January 2021, on a six-month loan to play the second half of the season.

He became a key played for Monza during the 2021–22 Serie B season, helping his side gain promotion to the Serie A for the first time in the club's history. Machín scored four goals in 25 regular season games, as well as a promotion play-off goal in the final against Pisa.

After taking part in the 2022–23 Serie A season with Monza, in which he played 25 games, on 27 July 2023, Monza renewed Machín's contract until 30 June 2026.

On 26 August 2024, Machín moved on loan to Frosinone in Serie B.

On 29 January 2025, Machín was recalled from Frosinone and joined Cartagena in Spain on loan until the end of the second-tier season.

On 17 June 2025, Machín's contract with Monza was terminated by mutual consent.

=== Vis Pesaro ===
On 31 October 2025, Machín joined Vis Pesaro.

=== Sambenedettese ===
On 20 August 2026, Machín joined Sambenedettese.

== International career ==
Born in Equatorial Guinea, Machín moved to Spain at an early age and obtained dual citizenship. He chose to represent his native country, and made his full international debut for Equatorial Guinea on 12 November 2015, coming on as a second-half substitute in a 2–0 loss against Morocco.

== Personal life ==
A few months after joining Barcelona, Machín confessed to being a fan of arch-rivals Real Madrid.

== Career statistics ==
=== Club ===
As of match played 4 June 2023

Appearances and goals by club, season and competition
Club	Season	League			National cup		Other		Total	
Club	Season	Division	Apps	Goals	Apps	Goals	Apps	Goals	Apps	Goals
Atlético Malagueño	2014–15	Tercera División	2	0	0	0	—		2	0
Roma	2015–16	Serie A	0	0	0	0	—		0	0
Roma	2016–17	Serie A	—		—		—		0	0
Roma	2017–18	Serie A	—		—		—		0	0
Roma	Total		0	0	0	0	0	0	0	0
Trapani (loan)	2016–17	Serie B	7	0	2	0	—		9	0
Lugano (loan)	2016–17	Swiss Super League	5	0	0	0	—		5	0
Brescia (loan)	2017–18	Serie B	22	1	0	0	—		22	1
Pescara (loan)	2017–18	Serie B	11	2	0	0	—		11	2
Pescara	2018–19	Serie B	17	1	2	0	—		19	1
Parma (loan)	2018–19	Serie A	2	0	0	0	—		2	0
Parma	2019–20	Serie A	0	0	0	0	—		0	0
Pescara (loan)	2019–20	Serie B	20	7	0	0	—		20	7
Monza (loan)	2019–20	Serie C	3	0	0	0	—		3	0
Monza	2020–21	Serie B	10	0	3	1	—		13	1
Monza	2021–22	Serie B	25	4	1	0	4 (Note: Appearances in play-offs)	1	30	5
Monza	2022–23	Serie A	25	0	2	0	—		27	0
Monza	Total		60	4	6	1	4	1	70	6
Pescara (loan)	2020–21	Serie B	19	2	0	0	—		19	2
Career total			168	17	8	1	4	1	180	19

=== International ===
As of match played 20 November 2023

Appearances and goals by national team and year
National team	Year	Apps	Goals
Equatorial Guinea	2015	2	0
Equatorial Guinea	2016	2	0
Equatorial Guinea	2017	1	0
Equatorial Guinea	2018	1	0
Equatorial Guinea	2019	2	0
Equatorial Guinea	2020	2	0
Equatorial Guinea	2021	5	0
Equatorial Guinea	2022	5	0
Equatorial Guinea	2023	3	0
Total		23	0

== Honours ==
Monza

- Serie C Group A: 2019–20
