= Júlio Alves =

Portuguese footballer

Personal information
- Full name: Júlio Regufe Alves
- Date of birth: 29 June 1991 (age 35)
- Place of birth: Póvoa de Varzim, Portugal
- Height: 1.80 m (5 ft 11 in)
- Position: Midfielder

Youth career
- 2001–2008: Varzim
- 2008–2009: Porto
- 2009–2010: Rio Ave

Senior career*
Years	Team	Apps	(Gls)
2010–2011	Rio Ave	9	(0)
2010–2011	→ Ribeirão (loan)	12	(0)
2011	Atlético Madrid	0	(0)
2011–2013	Beşiktaş	3	(0)
2012–2013	→ Sporting CP B (loan)	11	(0)
2013–2015	Rio Ave	4	(0)
2019–2020	Cerveira	19	(0)
Total		58	(0)

International career
2011	Portugal U20	16	(0)
2011	Portugal U21	1	(0)
Medal record
Men's football
Representing Portugal
FIFA U-20 World Cup
Runner-up	2011 Colombia
- * Club domestic league appearances and goals

Júlio Regufe Alves CvIH (born 29 June 1991) is a Portuguese former professional footballer who played as a midfielder.

== Club career ==
Born in Póvoa de Varzim, Alves played youth football with three clubs, finishing his development with Rio Ave FC. In the 2010–11 season, he made his senior debut with farm team G.D. Ribeirão in the third division.

In late January 2011, Alves was recalled by Rio Ave, making his Primeira Liga debut on 6 February by playing the last five minutes – and nearly scoring from a free kick – of a 1–0 away loss against FC Porto, which he had previously represented as a youth. He contributed 239 minutes (three starts), as his side finished eighth out of 16.

Alves was bought by Spanish club Atlético Madrid in July 2011. However, the following month, in the last day of the summer transfer window, he moved countries again, joining a host of compatriots at Beşiktaş J.K. including manager Carlos Carvalhal.

On 24 August 2012, Alves signed for Sporting CP B on loan, spending the 2012–13 campaign in the Segunda Liga. On 16 April of the following year, his contract was terminated for €200,000.

Alves then went back to Rio Ave, but a registration error meant that neither he nor Ângelo Meneses could take part in Nuno Espírito Santo's team. In February 2016, in an interview to site Mais Futebol, he acknowledged that if his career was not better it was mainly due to personal problems and own mistakes.

Alves returned to football after five years of inactivity, agreeing to a deal at C.D. Cerveira of the Portuguese third tier.

== International career ==
Alves represented Portugal at the 2011 FIFA U-20 World Cup, only missing one match in seven as the nation finished in second place in Colombia. His only appearance with the under-21s occurred on 5 September of that year, when he came on as a late substitute in the 1–0 friendly defeat of France in Rio Maior.

== Personal life ==
Alves' older brothers, Bruno and Geraldo, were also footballers. He had paternal Brazilian ancestry, his father Washington having played ten years of his career in Portugal – mainly with Varzim – where his children were born.

Their uncle, Geraldo Assoviador, was also involved in the sport.

== Honours ==
Portugal U20

- FIFA U-20 World Cup runner-up: 2011

Orders

- Knight of the Order of Prince Henry
