= Kelvin Matute =

Cameroonian footballer (born 1988)

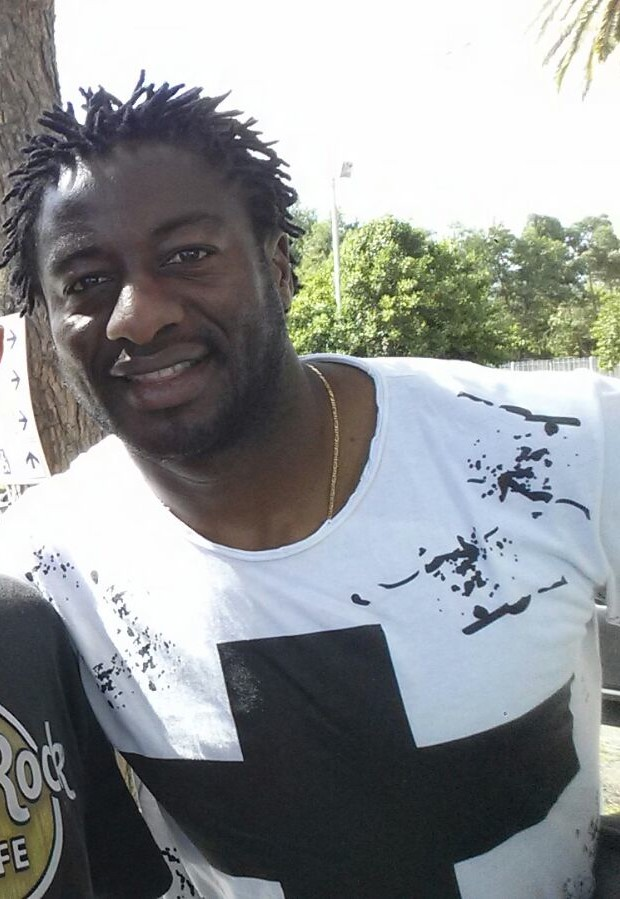

Personal information
- Full name: Kelvin Ewome Matute
- Date of birth: 10 October 1988 (age 38)
- Place of birth: Buea, Cameroon
- Height: 1.79 m (5 ft 10 1/2 in)
- Position: Defensive midfielder

Team information
- Current team: Taranto

Youth career
- 2006–2007: Udinese

Senior career*
Years	Team	Apps	(Gls)
2007–2011	Udinese	0	(0)
2008–2009	→ Arezzo (loan)	30	(2)
2009–2010	→ Cesena (loan)	9	(1)
2010–2011	→ Triestina (loan)	19	(0)
2011–2014	Crotone	59	(2)
2011–2012	→ Latina (loan)	32	(1)
2014–2016	Pro Vercelli	23	(0)
2015	→ Crotone (loan)	16	(0)
2016–2017	Casertana	30	(2)
2017–2018	Juve Stabia	34	(0)
2018–2019	Avellino	34	(3)
2019–	Taranto	12	(0)
- * Club domestic league appearances and goals as of 19:09, 30 November 2019 (UTC)

Kelvin Ewome Matute (born 10 October 1988) is a Cameroonian footballer. He currently plays in Italy for Taranto.

== Career ==
=== Club career ===
Ewome began his career in Italy with Sarone Calcio (an amateur soccer club based in Pordenone) in 2005. However, he was noticed by Udinese, and in 2006 he joined the young team. During the season, he didn't play for the first team, but gained the shirt number 16.

In February 2008 he was involved in an investigation by the Procura della Repubblica di Udine over the alleged falsification of documents. According to the Director of football of Cameroon side Acada Sport, the Italian Stefano Cusin, Ewome was born in 1985 and, during the 2005 Torneo di Viareggio played for the Africans, he left the club and changed identity. However the investigation acknowledged that Matute was born in 1988, but due to this he was allowed to play only 6 games for the young team.

He was sent on loan to Lega Pro Prima Divisione club Arezzo for the 2008–09 season, where he made 32 appearances, scoring 2 goals. The team ended the season at the fourth place and reached the playoffs where was sent off by Crotone. Ewome played both legs.

On June 26, 2009 Arezzo exercised the option to obtain the 50% of the player, but three days later Udinese exercised his option to obtain the whole rights of the player.

The following season he joined on loan Cesena. He made his debut for Cesena on August 29, 2009 as a 64th-minute substitute in a 2–0 away winning game against Gallipoli. During the season, he collected 9 caps and made one goal against Salernitana. Cesena ended the season at the Second place and were directly promoted in Serie A. On 11 August 2010 he joined Triestina on loan from Udinese.

=== Crotone ===
In January 2011 he was signed by F.C. Crotone in co-ownership deal. In June 2011 Udinese gave up the remain 50% registration rights to Crotone.

Matute spent 2 1/2 season with the Serie B club, as no.26 of the team.

=== Pro Vercelli ===
Matute joined Pro Vercelli at the start of 2014–15 Serie B season as free agent. He wore no.20 shirt for his new team. On 14 January 2015 Matute returned to Crotone, with Mattia Sprocati moved to Vercelli. His shirt number was changed to no.14.

=== Serie D ===
He joined Serie D club Avellino on 25 August 2018. On 25 July 2019, he moved to Taranto.
