= Bruno Alves =

Portuguese footballer (born 1981)

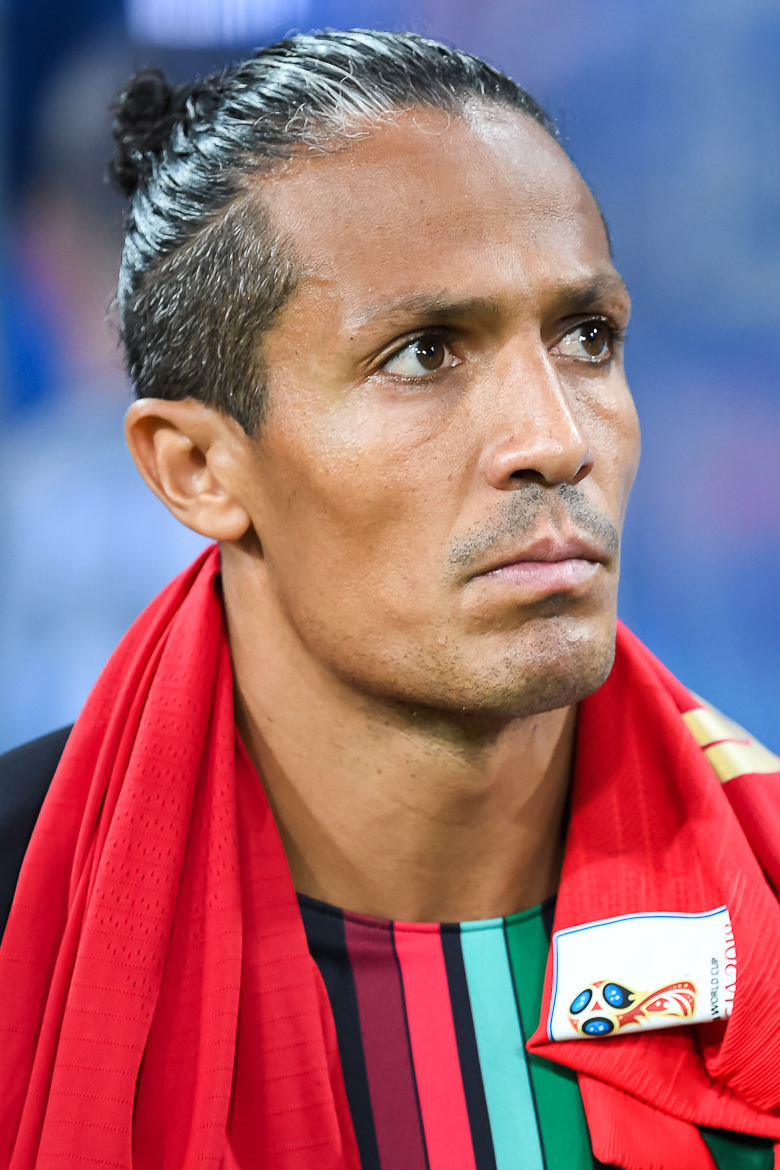
- Alves with Portugal in 2018

Personal information
- Full name: Bruno Eduardo Regufe Alves
- Date of birth: 27 November 1981 (age 44)
- Place of birth: Póvoa de Varzim, Portugal
- Height: 1.87 m (6 ft 2 in)
- Position: Centre-back

Youth career
- 1992–1999: Varzim
- 1999–2000: Porto

Senior career*
Years	Team	Apps	(Gls)
2000–2005	Porto B	58	(8)
2002–2010	Porto	119	(14)
2002–2003	→ Farense (loan)	46	(3)
2003–2004	→ Guimarães (loan)	26	(1)
2004–2005	→ AEK Athens (loan)	27	(0)
2010–2013	Zenit Saint Petersburg	71	(1)
2013–2016	Fenerbahçe	75	(3)
2016–2017	Cagliari	36	(1)
2017–2018	Rangers	20	(1)
2018–2021	Parma	85	(5)
2021	Famalicão	0	(0)
2021–2022	Apollon Smyrnis	19	(0)
Total		582	(37)

International career
2001–2002	Portugal U20	10	(1)
2002–2004	Portugal U21	19	(2)
2004	Portugal U23	3	(0)
2004	Portugal B	1	(0)
2007–2018	Portugal	96	(11)
Medal record
Men's football
Representing Portugal
FIFA Confederations Cup
Third place	2017 Russia
UEFA European Championship
Winner	2016 France
Bronze medal – third place	2012 Poland-Ukraine
UEFA European Under-21 Championship
Third place	2004 Germany
- * Club domestic league appearances and goals

Bruno Eduardo Regufe Alves ComM (Portuguese pronunciation: [ˈbɾunu ˈalvɨʃ]; born 27 November 1981) is a Portuguese former professional footballer who played as a central defender.

He began and spent most of his career at Porto, where he won nine titles and appeared in 171 official games. He also won trophies in Russia with Zenit Saint Petersburg, and in Turkey with Fenerbahçe.

A senior Portugal international since 2007, Alves represented the country in three World Cups, three European Championships and one Confederations Cup, winning Euro 2016 and earning 96 caps in the process.

== Club career ==
=== Porto ===
Alves was born in Póvoa de Varzim, and grew up in the Caxinas fishing neighbourhood of bordering Vila do Conde, as did his long-time international teammates Hélder Postiga and Fábio Coentrão. He started playing football for local club Varzim, before joining the youth ranks of Porto at the age of 17.

After three consecutive loans, two in Portugal and another in Greece AEK Athens, moving alongside his teammate Paulo Assunção on the indication of manager Fernando Santos, Alves returned to Porto for the 2005–06 season, extending his contract until 2010 and battling for a first-team spot with Ricardo Costa and João Paulo. He played seven league games for the eventual Primeira Liga champions, but was sent off on 15 October 2005 in a 0–2 home loss against Benfica, after headbutting Nuno Gomes.

The arrival of manager Jesualdo Ferreira in summer 2006 signalled the turning point in Alves' career. He beat off stiff competition for a starting berth in the team alongside Pepe and formed a solid partnership with the Brazilian-born stopper. An impressive campaign saw the player finally come of age, and he was ever-present as the northerners won another national championship.

On 7 April 2009, Alves' early mistake in a UEFA Champions League quarter-final tie against Manchester United at Old Trafford led to Wayne Rooney's equaliser– the match ended 2–2 and Porto went on to lose 3–2 on aggregate. However, on 10 May, he headed in the only goal in a home win over Nacional which ensured team and player a fourth consecutive league accolade.

=== Zenit Saint Petersburg ===
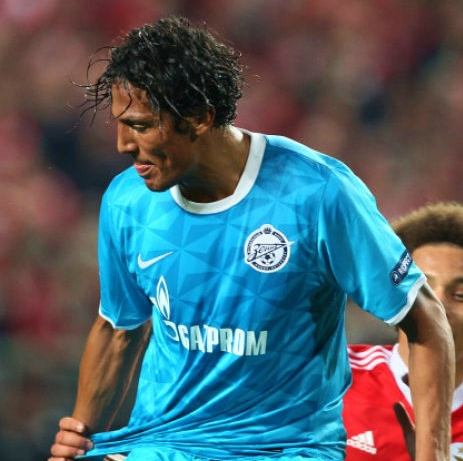
Alves in action for Zenit

On 3 August 2010, aged 28, Alves signed with Russian Premier League side Zenit Saint Petersburg for €22 million, joining compatriots Danny and Fernando Meira in the squad. Upon his arrival, head coach Luciano Spalletti described him as a very important player for the team, noting his experience, ability in the air and strong character.

Alves scored his first goal for the side on 30 September 2010, against former team AEK Athens in the group stage of the UEFA Europa League.

=== Fenerbahçe ===
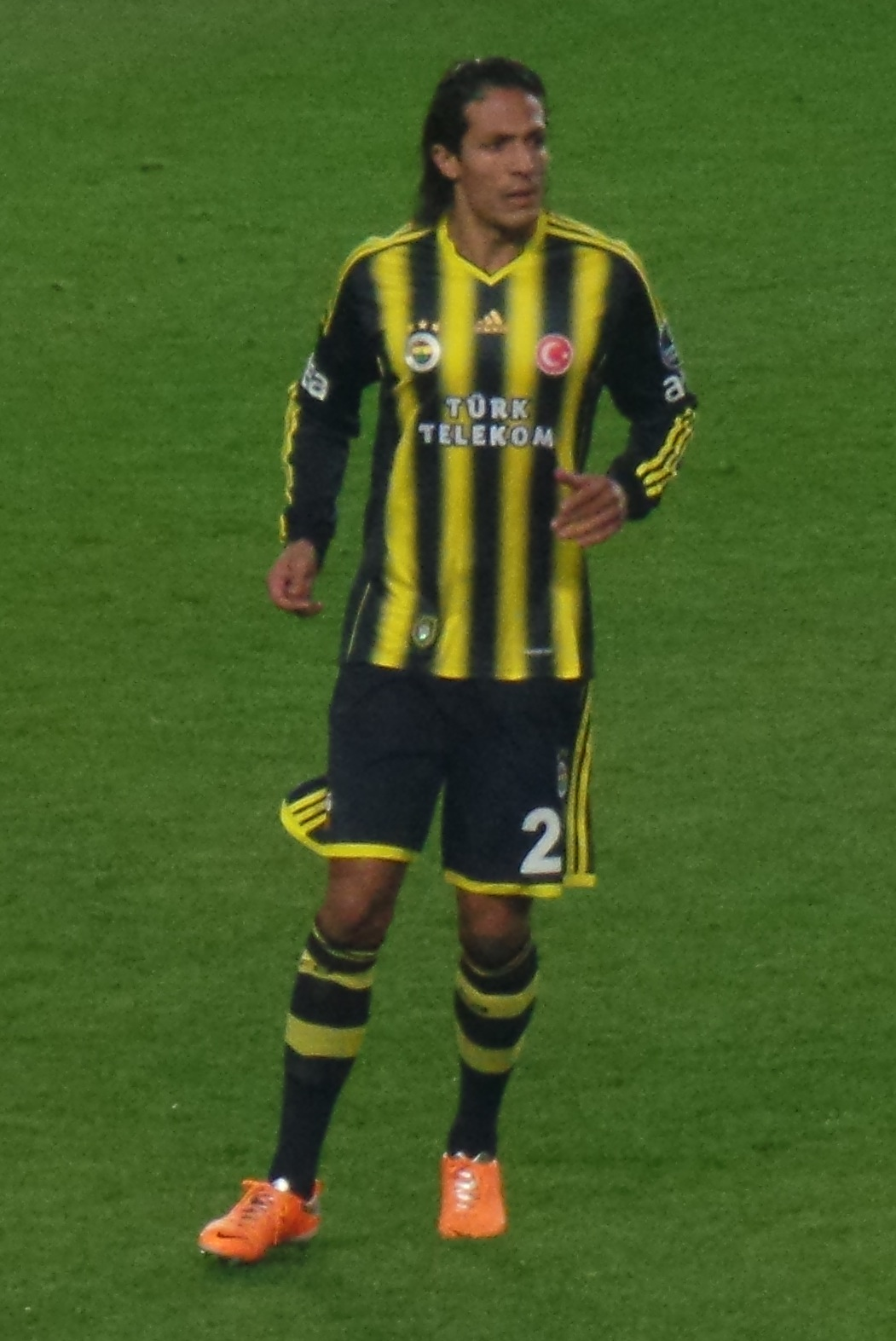
Alves playing for Fenerbahçe in 2014

On 5 June 2013, Alves agreed to join Turkey's Fenerbahçe on a three-year deal worth €2.5 million per season, for a transfer fee of €5.5 million. He scored twice in 25 league appearances in his first season in Istanbul to help the side win the Süper Lig title, and also contested in their Turkish Super Cup win against Galatasaray on 25 August 2014.

On 18 October 2014, Alves was given a straight red card for kicking Blerim Džemaili, as his team eventually lost 2–1 to Galatasaray at the Türk Telekom Arena. He was sent off again on 25 May 2015, for conceding a penalty against another team from the city, İstanbul Başakşehir, being the second of four Fener players to be dismissed in a 2–2 draw which gave the title to Galatasaray.

=== Cagliari ===
On 5 June 2016, Alves signed a two-year contract with Cagliari, who had recently returned to the Italian Serie A. The deal was set to go through when he became a free agent at the end of the month. He made his debut on 15 August 2016, in a 5–1 home win over SPAL in the Coppa Italia, and scored his first goal on 11 September, which was a free-kick in a 2–1 league loss at Bologna.

=== Rangers ===
On 31 May 2017, Alves signed for Rangers on a two-year deal for an undisclosed fee. He scored his first goal for his new team on 9 August, in a 6–0 rout of Dunfermline Athletic in the Scottish League Cup.

On 24 October 2017, two days after an incident with Louis Moult during a 2–0 defeat against Motherwell in the League Cup semi-finals, Alves was handed a two-match ban which was appealed. On 11 July 2018, the 36-year-old terminated his contract by mutual consent.

=== Parma ===
Alves returned to the Italian top division in the summer of 2018, joining recently promoted Parma until 30 June 2019. In February 2019, he signed a new deal covering the 2019–20 season and, in January 2020, agreed to a further extension until June 2021.

On 30 May 2021, after being relegated to Serie B, Alves announced he was leaving the club.

=== Later years ===
Alves agreed to a two-year contract with Famalicão on 1 July 2021. Two weeks later, however, after falling out with the management, he cancelled it.

On 4 September 2021, Alves signed a one-year deal at Apollon Smyrnis; aged nearly 40, he returned to the Greek top flight and the city of Athens for the first time in 16 years. He announced his retirement in June 2022, being appointed sporting director of AEK Athens shortly after.

On 27 February 2026, Alves joined Rio Ave in the same capacity.

== International career ==
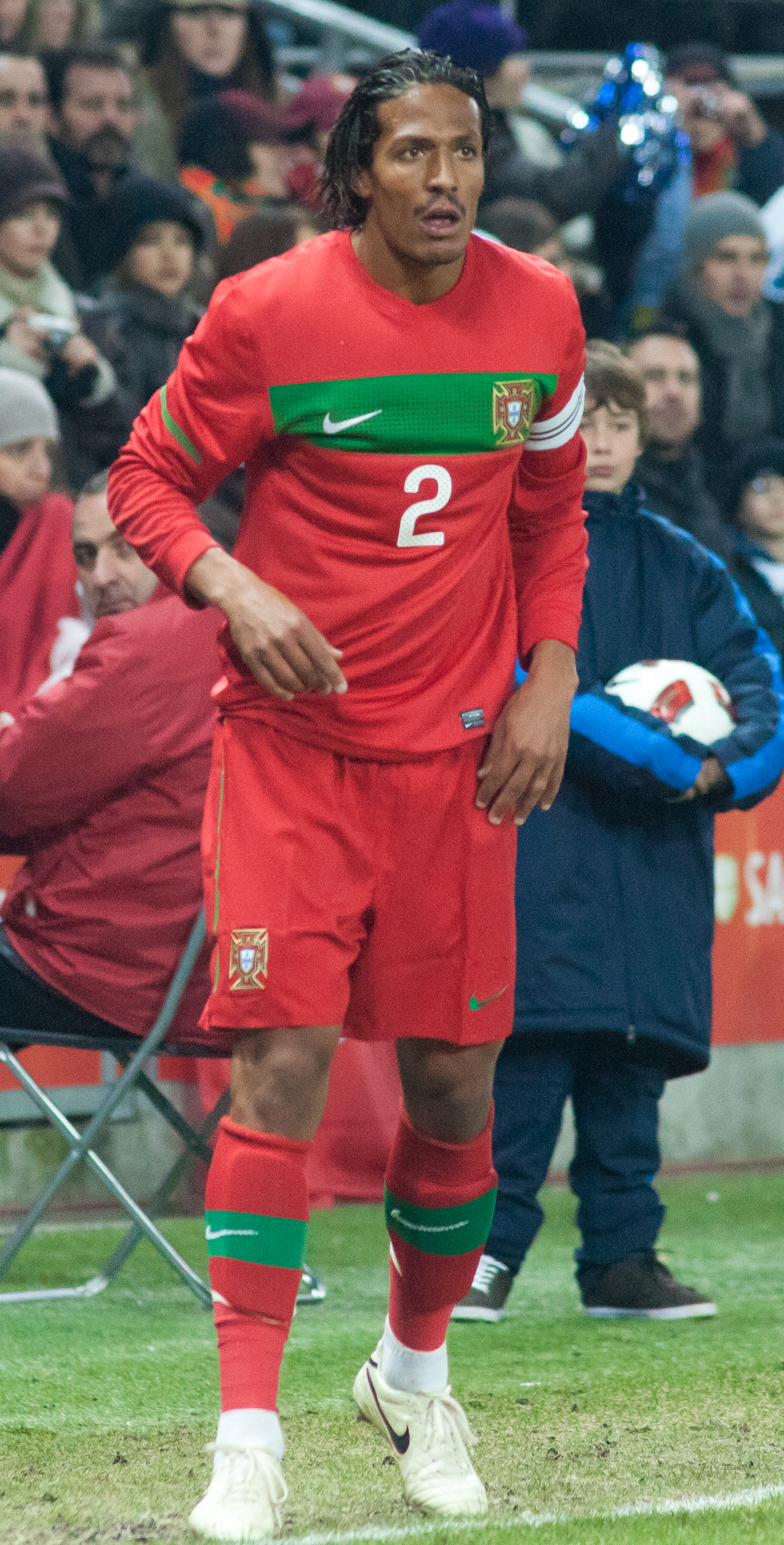
Alves playing for Portugal in 2011

Alves played for Portugal at the 2004 Summer Olympics, with the country's participation ending after three games in Greece. Luiz Felipe Scolari gave him his full international debut in June 2007 against Kuwait in a 1–1 away draw, and he was later selected as a back-up for UEFA Euro 2008, appearing in the 2–0 group stage loss to Switzerland.

A regular starter during the 2010 FIFA World Cup qualifiers, Alves headed the winner in injury time for the final 2–1 win in Albania on 6 June 2009, allowing Portugal to reach the play-offs; there, in the first leg in Lisbon, he also found the net (the game's only goal) against Bosnia and Herzegovina, in an eventual 2–0 aggregate qualification. He also played all the matches and minutes in the finals in South Africa, in an eventual round-of-16 exit.

Alves was ever-present at the Euro 2012 tournament, starring alongside former Porto teammate Pepe. In the semi-finals, against Spain, he missed his penalty shootout attempt in a 4–2 loss.

Ten days after being included in Paulo Bento's final 23-men squad for the 2014 World Cup, Alves scored a 93rd-minute winner in a 1–0 friendly win over Mexico for his tenth international goal, also featuring in the tournament opener against Germany, a 4–0 defeat. He also started in the following two fixtures in Brazil, in a group stage exit.

Alves was also selected for Euro 2016. In the penultimate warm-up game away to England on 2 June, he was sent off in the first half for a head-high tackle on Harry Kane; he only made his debut in the tournament in the semi-finals against Wales due to injury to Pepe, playing the full 90 minutes and being booked in a 2–0 victory at the Parc Olympique Lyonnais.

In May 2017, Alves was picked for the 2017 FIFA Confederations Cup squad. The following year, he was selected for the 2018 World Cup that was held in Russia.

== Personal life ==
Alves' older brother, Geraldo, was also a footballer and a central defender. He had paternal Brazilian ancestry through his father Washington, who spent ten years of his career in Portugal – mainly with Varzim – where his children were born.

The youngest sibling, Júlio, was also a footballer, playing in the midfielder position. Their uncle Geraldo Assoviador was also involved in the sport.

== Career statistics ==
=== Club ===
Appearances and goals by club, season and competition
Club	Season	League			National cup (Note: Includes Taça de Portugal, Greek Football Cup, Russian Cup, Turkish Cup, Coppa Italia, Scottish Cup)		League cup (Note: Includes Taça da Liga, Scottish League Cup)		Continental		Other		Total	
Club	Season	Division	Apps	Goals	Apps	Goals	Apps	Goals	Apps	Goals	Apps	Goals	Apps	Goals
Porto B	1999–2000	Segunda Divisão	4	0	—		—		—		—		4	0
Porto B	2000–01	Segunda Divisão	36	6	—		—		—		—		36	6
Porto B	2001–02	Segunda Divisão	17	2	—		—		—		—		17	2
Porto B	2005–06	Segunda Divisão	1	0	—		—		—		—		1	0
Porto B	Total		58	8	—		—		—		—		58	8
Porto	2005–06	Primeira Liga	7	0	1	0	—		3 (Note: Appearances in UEFA Champions League)	0	—		11	0
Porto	2006–07	Primeira Liga	28	2	0	0	—		8	0	0	0	36	2
Porto	2007–08	Primeira Liga	27	2	2	0	0	0	8	0	1 (Note: Appearance in Supertaça Cândido de Oliveira)	0	38	2
Porto	2008–09	Primeira Liga	30	5	4	0	1	0	10	1	1	0	46	6
Porto	2009–10	Primeira Liga	27	5	2	0	2	0	8	1	1	1	40	7
Porto	Total		119	14	9	0	3	0	37	2	3	1	171	17
Farense (loan)	2001–02	Primeira Liga	15	0	0	0	—		—		—		15	0
Farense (loan)	2002–03	Segunda Liga	31	3	2	0	—		—		—		33	3
Farense (loan)	Total		46	3	2	0	—		—		—		48	3
Vitória Guimarães (loan)	2003–04	Primeira Liga	26	1	1	0	—		—		—		27	1
AEK Athens (loan)	2004–05	Super League Greece	27	0	10	1	—		5 (Note: Appearances in UEFA Cup)	0	—		42	1
Zenit Saint Petersburg	2010	Russian Premier League	14	0	2	0	—		9 (Note: Two appearances in UEFA Champions League, seven appearances and one goal in UEFA Europa League)	1	—		25	1
Zenit Saint Petersburg	2011–12	Russian Premier League	36	0	3	0	—		5	0	1 (Note: Appearance in Russian Super Cup)	0	45	0
Zenit Saint Petersburg	2012–13	Russian Premier League	21	1	2	1	—		6 (Note: Five appearances in UEFA Champions League, one in UEFA Europa League)	0	1	0	30	2
Zenit Saint Petersburg	Total		71	1	7	1	—		20	1	2	0	100	3
Fenerbahçe	2013–14	Süper Lig	25	2	0	0	—		4	0	1 (Note: Appearance in Turkish Super Cup)	0	30	2
Fenerbahçe	2014–15	Süper Lig	24	0	5	1	—		—		1	0	30	1
Fenerbahçe	2015–16	Süper Lig	26	1	3	0	—		12 (Note: Two appearances in UEFA Champions League, ten in UEFA Europa League)	0	—		41	1
Fenerbahçe	Total		75	3	8	1	—		16	0	2	0	101	4
Cagliari	2016–17	Serie A	36	1	1	0	—		—		—		37	1
Rangers	2017–18	Scottish Premiership	20	1	2	0	3	1	0	0	—		25	2
Parma	2018–19	Serie A	33	4	0	0	—		—		—		33	4
Parma	2019–20	Serie A	33	0	1	0	—		—		—		34	0
Parma	2020–21	Serie A	19	1	0	0	—		—		—		19	1
Parma	Total		85	5	1	0	—		—		—		86	5
Apollon Smyrnis	2021–22	Super League Greece	19	0	1	0	—		—		—		20	0
Career total			582	37	42	3	6	1	78	3	7	1	715	45

=== International ===
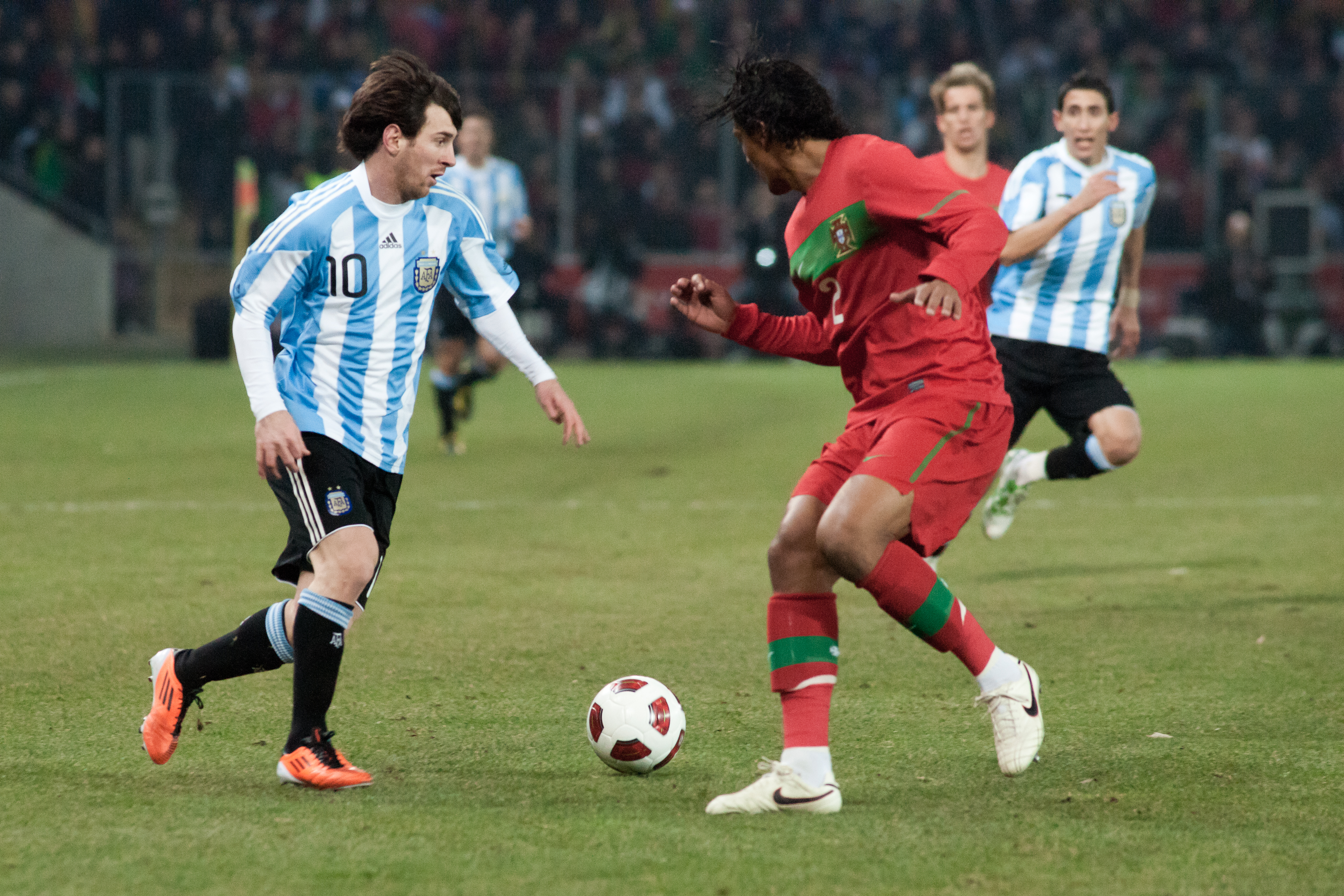
Alves (right) and Argentina's Lionel Messi in 2011

Appearances and goals by national team and year
National team	Year	Apps	Goals
Portugal	2007	8	1
Portugal	2008	8	1
Portugal	2009	11	3
Portugal	2010	11	0
Portugal	2011	9	0
Portugal	2012	13	1
Portugal	2013	10	3
Portugal	2014	7	1
Portugal	2015	6	0
Portugal	2016	5	1
Portugal	2017	6	0
Portugal	2018	2	0
Total		96	11

Scores and results list Portugal's goal tally first, score column indicates score after each Alves goal.

List of international goals scored by Bruno Alves
No.	Date	Venue	Opponent	Score	Result	Competition
1	13 October 2007	Shafa Stadium, Baku, Azerbaijan	Azerbaijan	1–0	2–0	Euro 2008 qualifying
2	20 August 2008	Estádio Municipal de Aveiro, Aveiro, Portugal,	Faroe Islands	4–0	5–0	Friendly
3	31 March 2009	Stade Olympique de la Pontaise, Lausanne, Switzerland	South Africa	1–0	2–0	Friendly
4	6 June 2009	Qemal Stafa Stadium, Tirana, Albania	Albania	2–1	2–1	2010 World Cup qualification
5	14 November 2009	Estádio da Luz, Lisbon, Portugal	Bosnia and Herzegovina	1–0	1–0	2010 World Cup qualification play-offs
6	11 September 2012	Estádio Municipal de Braga, Braga, Portugal	Azerbaijan	3–0	3–0	2014 World Cup qualification
7	22 March 2013	Ramat Gan Stadium, Ramat Gan, Israel	Israel	1–0	3–3	2014 World Cup qualification
8	26 March 2013	Tofiq Bahramov Stadium, Baku, Azerbaijan	Azerbaijan	1–0	2–0	2014 World Cup qualification
9	6 September 2013	Windsor Park, Belfast, Northern Ireland	Northern Ireland	1–0	4–2	2014 World Cup qualification
10	6 June 2014	Gillette Stadium, Foxborough, United States	Mexico	1–0	1–0	Friendly
11	13 November 2016	Estádio Algarve, São João da Venda, Portugal	Latvia	4–1	4–1	2018 World Cup qualification

== Honours ==
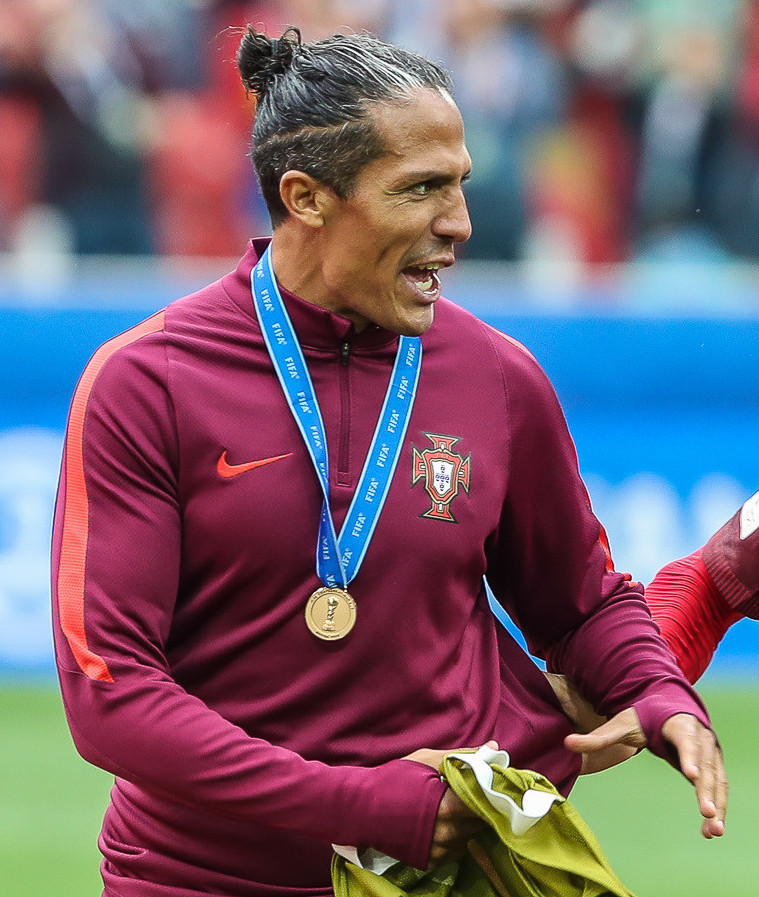
Alves with his bronze medal from the 2017 FIFA Confederations Cup

Porto

- Primeira Liga: 2005–06, 2006–07, 2007–08, 2008–09
- Taça de Portugal: 2005–06, 2008–09, 2009–10
- Supertaça Cândido de Oliveira: 2006, 2009

Zenit Saint Petersburg

- Russian Premier League: 2010, 2011–12
- Russian Super Cup: 2011

Fenerbahçe

- Süper Lig: 2013–14
- Turkish Super Cup: 2014

Portugal U21

- Toulon Tournament: 2001

Portugal B

- Torneio Vale do Tejo: 2004

Portugal

- UEFA European Championship: 2016
- FIFA Confederations Cup third place: 2017

Individual

- Primeira Liga Player of the Year: 2009

Orders

- Commander of the Order of Merit
