= Geraldo Alves (footballer, born 1980) =

Portuguese retired footballer (born 1980)

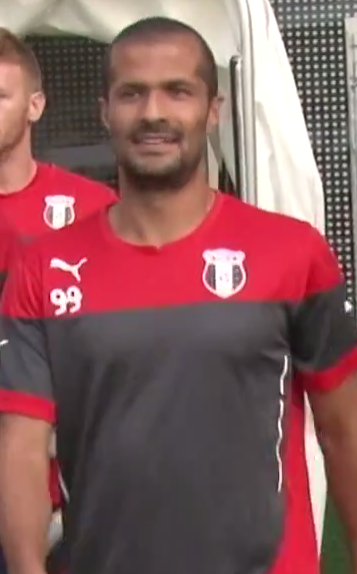
- Alves with Astra Giurgiu in 2015

Personal information
- Full name: Geraldo Washington Regufe Alves
- Date of birth: 8 November 1980 (age 46)
- Place of birth: Minas Gerais, Brazil
- Height: 1.83 m (6 ft 0 in)
- Position: Centre-back

Team information
- Current team: Rapid București (assistant)

Youth career
- 1991–1999: Varzim

Senior career*
Years	Team	Apps	(Gls)
1999–2001	Benfica B	60	(1)
2000–2004	Benfica	5	(0)
2002	→ Beira-Mar (loan)	9	(1)
2002–2003	→ Gil Vicente (loan)	16	(0)
2003–2004	→ Paços Ferreira (loan)	17	(1)
2004–2007	Paços Ferreira	73	(8)
2007–2010	AEK Athens	51	(0)
2010–2012	Steaua București	54	(3)
2012–2015	Petrolul Ploiești	65	(4)
2015–2017	Astra Giurgiu	42	(1)
Total		392	(19)

Managerial career
- 2026–: Rapid București (assistant)
- * Club domestic league appearances and goals

Geraldo Washington Regufe Alves (Portuguese pronunciation: [ʒɨˈɾaldu ˈalvɨʃ]; born 8 November 1980) is a Portuguese former professional footballer who played as a central defender. He is currently assistant coach at Liga I club Rapid București.

Born in Brazil, he spent his 18-year senior career in Portugal, Greece and Romania. He notably won the 2015–16 Liga I with Astra Giurgiu.

== Club career ==
=== Portugal ===
Born in Minas Gerais in Brazil to a Portuguese mother, Alves moved to Póvoa de Varzim when he was six months old. He finished his football development at Varzim, signing with Primeira Liga giants Benfica in 1999 and going on to appear in six competitive games over the course of two seasons while being mainly registered with the reserves in the third division, where he was also deployed as a defensive midfielder.

Alves moved to fellow top-flight club Beira-Mar in January 2002, where he was sparingly used. He then represented Gil Vicente and Paços de Ferreira also on loan, experiencing his most steady period at the latter after a permanent transfer; in the 2006–07 campaign, as they achieved a first-ever qualification for the UEFA Cup, he played 28 matches and added two goals, all in a 2–1 home win over Nacional on 7 April 2007.

=== AEK Athens ===
On 5 June 2007, Alves signed a three-year deal worth €1.3 million with AEK Athens, where his younger brother Bruno had already played on loan from Porto. In a 20 September UEFA Cup match against Red Bull Salzburg, he scored his first goal for the side in a 3–0 home win (3–1 on aggregate).

A starter in his debut season, Alves lost his spot in 2008–09 to Swedish international Daniel Majstorović, and reportedly was also unhappy for not being played in his natural position.

=== Romania ===
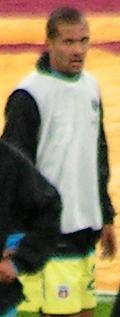
Alves warming up for Steaua București in 2010

On 5 July 2010, Alves joined Steaua București on a free transfer, signing a two-year contract. He made his Liga I debut 20 days later, against Universitatea Cluj.

Alves scored his first two official goals for Steaua on 5 April 2011, in a 5–0 home defeat of Unirea Urziceni in the league, with his team eventually ranking fifth and qualifying for the Europa League. In June 2012, he was released by the club due to his high salary.

Alves agreed to stay in Romania on 17 August 2012, on a two-year deal at Petrolul Ploiești. He was eventually awarded captaincy.

On 3 September 2017, the 36-year-old Alves announced his retirement. In the previous season, he won his only national championship with Astra Giurgiu.

Alves subsequently worked as youth coach at Rapid București.

== Personal life ==
Alves' younger brother, Bruno, was also a footballer and a central defender; he had paternal Brazilian ancestry, his father Washington having spent ten years of his career in Portugal – mainly with Varzim – where his children were born. The youngest sibling, Júlio, was also a footballer, and their uncle Geraldo Assoviador also played the sport.

Alves married a Romanian woman, with the couple having one daughter.

== Honours ==
Paços Ferreira

- Segunda Liga: 2004–05

AEK Athens

- Greek Football Cup runner-up: 2008–09

Steaua București

- Cupa României: 2010–11

Petrolul Ploiești

- Cupa României: 2012–13

Astra Giurgiu

- Liga I: 2015–16
- Supercupa României: 2016
- Cupa României runner-up: 2016–17
