= Geraldo Assoviador =

Brazilian footballer (1954-1976)

Personal information
- Full name: Geraldo Cleofas Dias Alves
- Date of birth: 16 April 1954
- Place of birth: Barão de Cocais, Minas Gerais, Brazil
- Date of death: 26 August 1976 (aged 22)
- Place of death: Rio de Janeiro, Brazil
- Height: 1.76 m (5 ft 9 in)
- Position: Midfielder

Youth career
- 1971–1972: Flamengo

Senior career*
Years	Team	Apps	(Gls)
1973–1976	Flamengo	58	(1)

International career
1975–1976	Brazil	5	(0)
- * Club domestic league appearances and goals

Geraldo Cleofas Dias Alves (16 April 1954 – 26 August 1976), better known as Geraldo Assoviador, was a Brazilian International footballer.

== Career ==
Geraldo Assoviador spent his entire career at Flamengo of Rio de Janeiro. In the Brazilian league, he appeared in 58 games and scored one goal. In all the competitions played for Flamengo he has a total of 168 matches and 13 goals. He has 5 caps for Brazil representing the country at the 1975 Copa América.

== Personal life ==
His brother Washington Geraldo Dias Alves is a former professional footballer too, having played ten years of his career in Portugal – mainly with Varzim – where his children were born to a Portuguese mother. His nephews Geraldo, Bruno, and Júlio also played the sport.

== Death ==
He died on 26 August 1976 at age 22 after a tonsillitis operation. Although the intervention went as planned, the player suffered an anaphylaxis shock due to the local anesthesia that produced a cardiac arrest.

== Honours ==
=== Club ===
Flamengo

- Campeonato Carioca: 1974
- Taça Guanabara: 1973

=== International ===
Brazil

- Taça do Atlântico: 1976
