= Hernani (footballer, born 1994) =

Brazilian footballer

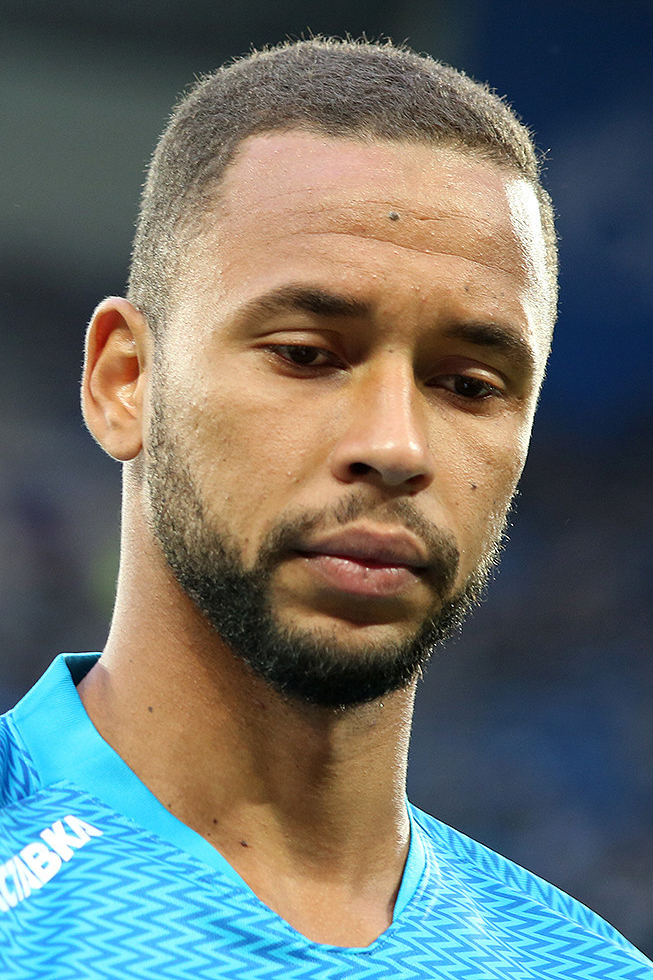
- Hernani with Zenit St. Petersburg in 2018

Personal information
- Full name: Hernani Azevedo Júnior
- Date of birth: 27 March 1994 (age 32)
- Place of birth: São Gonçalo do Sapucaí, Brazil
- Height: 1.88 m (6 ft 2 in)
- Position: Midfielder

Team information
- Current team: Palermo
- Number: 23

Youth career
- 2009–2013: Atlético Paranaense

Senior career*
Years	Team	Apps	(Gls)
2013–2016	Atlético Paranaense	75	(10)
2013	→ Joinville (loan)	9	(0)
2017–2020	Zenit St. Petersburg	23	(1)
2017–2018	→ Saint-Étienne (loan)	14	(3)
2019–2020	→ Parma (loan)	32	(0)
2020–2026	Parma	98	(13)
2021–2022	→ Genoa (loan)	18	(0)
2022–2023	→ Reggina (loan)	31	(7)
2026	Monza	18	(5)
2026–	Palermo	7	(1)

International career
2011	Brazil U17	15	(0)
- * Club domestic league appearances and goals as of 28 October 2026

Hernani Azevedo Júnior (born 27 March 1994), simply known as Hernani, is a Brazilian professional footballer who plays as a midfielder for Serie B club Palermo.

== Club career ==
=== Early career in Brazil ===
Born in São Gonçalo do Sapucaí, Minas Gerais, Hernani graduated from Atlético Paranaense's youth setup. He made his senior debuts in 2013 Campeonato Paranaense.

On 22 August 2013, Hernani was loaned to Série B side Joinville until December. He made his professional debut on 3 September, coming on as a second half substitute in a 1–1 home draw against Ceará.

Hernani returned to Furacão in January 2014 and made his Série A debut on 10 September, replacing Marcos Guilherme in a 0–1 away loss against Grêmio. Four days later he was handed his first start, and scored the last goal of a 2–0 home win against Vitória.

=== Zenit ===
On 16 December 2016, Hernani signed a five-year contract with Russian Premier League side Zenit St. Petersburg.

==== Saint-Étienne (loan) ====
On 8 August 2017, he joined Saint-Étienne on loan until the end of the 2017–18 season.

=== Parma ===
On 12 July 2019, Hernani joined Parma on loan until the end of the 2019–20 season, with Parma holding an obligation to buy. At the same time he signed a contract with Parma until 30 June 2023.

==== Loans to Genoa and Reggina ====
On 7 August 2021, Hernani joined Genoa on loan with an obligation to buy. The obligation was not fulfilled and the rights reverted to Parma.

On 1 September 2022, Hernani moved to Reggina on loan.

=== Monza ===
On 9 January 2026, Hernani signed for Serie B side Monza on a contract valid until 30 June 2027.

=== Palermo ===
On 6 July 2026, Hernani transferred to Serie B side Palermo.

== Career statistics ==
As of match played 28 October 2026

Appearances and goals by club, season and competition
Club	Season	League			State league		National cup (Note: Includes Copa do Brasil, Russian Cup, Coupe de France, Coppa Italia)		League cup		Continental		Other		Total	
Club	Season	Division	Apps	Goals	Apps	Goals	Apps	Goals	Apps	Goals	Apps	Goals	Apps	Goals	Apps	Goals
Atlético Paranaense	2013	Série A	0	0	21 (Note: Appearances in Campeonato Paranaense)	2	0	0	—		—		—		21	2
Atlético Paranaense	2014	Série A	15	1	10	3	0	0	—		—		—		25	4
Atlético Paranaense	2015	Série A	30	3	6	1	0	0	—		4 (Note: Appearances in Copa Libertadores)	0	—		40	4
Atlético Paranaense	2016	Série A	30	6	6	1	7	2	—		—		1 (Note: Appearance in Primeira Liga)	0	44	9
Atlético Paranaense	Total		75	10	43	7	7	2	—		4	0	1	0	130	19
Joinville (loan)	2013	Série B	9	0	—		—		—		—		—		9	0
Zenit St. Petersburg	2016–17	Russian Premier League	8	0	—		—		—		1 (Note: Appearances in UEFA Europa League)	0	—		9	0
Zenit St. Petersburg	2017–18	Russian Premier League	1	0	—		—		—		1	0	—		2	0
Zenit St. Petersburg	2018–19	Russian Premier League	14	1	—		2	0	—		10	0	—		26	1
Zenit St. Petersburg	Total		23	1	—		2	0	—		12	0	—		37	1
Saint-Étienne (loan)	2017–18	Ligue 1	14	3	—		2	0	1 (Note: Appearance in Coupe de la Ligue)	0	—		—		17	3
Parma (loan)	2019–20	Serie A	32	0	—		2	1	—		—		—		34	1
Parma	2020–21	Serie A	33	7	—		2	0	—		—		—		35	7
Parma	2023–24	Serie B	36	3	—		2	0	—		—		—		38	3
Parma	2024–25	Serie A	25	3	—		0	0	—		—		—		25	3
Parma	2025–26	Serie A	4	0	—		1	0	—		—		—		5	0
Parma	Total		130	13	—		7	1	—		—		—		137	14
Genoa (loan)	2021–22	Serie A	18	0	—		2	0	—		—		—		20	0
Reggina (loan)	2022–23	Serie B	30	7	—		—		—		—		1 (Note: Appearance(s) in promotion playoff)	0	31	7
Monza	2025–26	Serie B	18	5	—		—		—		—		4	1	22	6
Palermo	2026–27	Serie B	7	1	—		2	0	—		—		—		9	1
Career total			324	40	43	7	22	3	1	0	16	0	6	1	413	51

== Honours ==
Zenit Saint Petersburg

- Russian Premier League: 2018–19

Parma

- Serie B: 2023–24

Brazil U-17

- South American Under-17 Football Championship: 2011
