= Vincenzo Mustacciolo =

Italian footballer

Personal information
- Date of birth: 17 March 2000 (age 26)
- Place of birth: Palermo, Italy
- Height: 1.71 m (5 ft 7 in)
- Position: Midfielder

Team information
- Current team: Athletic Club Palermo

Senior career*
| Years | Team | Apps | (Gls) |
| 2017–2018 | Troina | 19 | (0) |
| 2018–2021 | Parma | 0 | (0) |
| 2018 | → Troina (loan) | 11 | (1) |
| 2018–2019 | → Siracusa (loan) | 16 | (0) |
| 2019–2020 | → Ravenna (loan) | 10 | (0) |
| 2021 | Acireale | 7 | (0) |
| 2021 | Paternò | 4 | (0) |
| 2022 | Troina | 10 | (0) |
| 2022–2023 | Oratorio S. Ciro E Giorgio | | |
| 2023 | CUS Palermo | | |
| 2023– | Athletic Club Palermo | | |
- * Club domestic league appearances and goals as of 19:36, 30 July 2023 (UTC)

Vincenzo Mustacciolo (born 17 March 2000) is an Italian football player. He plays for Athletic Club Palermo.

== Club career ==
He started his senior career in Serie D with Troina. On 31 January 2018, he signed with Parma (in Serie B at the time), who loaned him back to Troina for the rest of the 2017–18 season.

For the 2018–19 season he joined Serie C club Siracusa on loan.

He made his professional Serie C debut for Siracusa on 25 September 2018 in a game against Paganese. He substituted Marco Palermo in the 81st minute. He made his first start for Siracusa on 21 October 2018 in a game against Potenza. He finished the loan with 16 appearances, including 9 in the starting line-up.

On 27 July 2019 he joined Ravenna on loan, again in the Serie C.

On 13 August 2021, he signed with Serie D club Acireale. On 4 December 2021, he moved on loan to Paternò, also in Serie D. On 30 December 2021, he signed for Troina. In July 2022 he then moved to Oratorio S. Ciro E Giorgio, and then to CUS Palermo in January 2023. In the summer 2023, Mustacciolo joined Athletic Club Palermo.
