= Daan Dierckx =

Belgian association football player

Personal information
- Date of birth: 24 February 2003 (age 23)
- Place of birth: Leuven, Belgium
- Height: 1.92 m (6 ft 4 in)
- Position: Center back

Team information
- Current team: Standard Liège
- Number: 29

Youth career
- –2020: Genk
- 2020–2021: Parma

Senior career*
Years	Team	Apps	(Gls)
2020–2023	Parma	7	(0)
2022–2023	→ Jong Genk (loan)	21	(0)
2023–	SL16 FC	27	(3)
2024–	Standard Liège	31	(0)

International career^{‡}
2018	Belgium U16	2	(0)
2021	Belgium U19	1	(0)
- * Club domestic league appearances and goals as of 31 May 2026 ‡ National team caps and goals as of 9 October 2021

Daan Dierckx (born 24 February 2003) is a Belgian professional footballer who plays as a centre back for Standard Liège and their reserve squad SL16 FC.

== Club career ==
Dierckx joined Parma in January 2021 from Genk. He made his Serie A debut on 17 January 2021 against Sassuolo.

On 12 August 2022, Dierckx was loaned back by Genk and assigned to the reserve squad Jong Genk in the second-tier Challenger Pro League.

On 3 September 2023, Dierckx signed a three-year contract with Standard Liège. He was assigned to the reserve squad SL16 FC.
