= Gabriele Carannante =

Italian footballer

Personal information
- Date of birth: 27 February 1999 (age 27)
- Place of birth: Naples, Italy
- Height: 1.84 m (6 ft 0 in)
- Position: Midfielder

Team information
- Current team: Casatese Merate

Youth career
- –2015: Martina

Senior career*
Years	Team	Apps	(Gls)
2015–2016	Puteolana		
2016–2017	Altovicentino	0	(0)
2017	Vibonese	6	(0)
2018	Audace Cerignola	14	(0)
2018–2021	Parma	0	(0)
2018–2019	→ Audace Cerignola (loan)	30	(3)
2019	→ Monopoli (loan)	0	(0)
2019–2020	→ Pianese (loan)	15	(0)
2020–2021	→ Legnago (loan)	3	(0)
2021	→ Turris (loan)	4	(0)
2021–2022	Casertana	23	(0)
2022–2024	Grosseto	44	(1)
2024	Pistoiese		
2024–	Casatese Merate	66	(8)
- * Club domestic league appearances and goals as of 25 June 2026

Gabriele Carannante (born 27 February 1999) is an Italian football player. He plays for Serie C Group B club Casatese Merate.

== Club career ==
He spent the first several seasons of his senior career in Serie D.

On 2 September 2019 he joined Serie C club Pianese on loan from Parma.

He made his professional Serie C debut for Pianese on 15 September 2019 in a game against AlbinoLeffe. He started the game and was substituted at half-time.

On 14 September 2020 he was loaned to Legnago. On 28 January 2021 he moved on loan to Turris.

On 17 September 2021, he joined Casertana in Serie D.
