= Fabian Pavone =

Italian footballer (born 2000)

Personal information
- Date of birth: 5 February 2000 (age 26)
- Place of birth: Atri, Italy
- Height: 1.69 m (5 ft 7 in)
- Position: Forward

Team information
- Current team: Teramo

Youth career
- Pescara

Senior career*
Years	Team	Apps	(Gls)
2019	Pescara	0	(0)
2019–2024	Parma	0	(0)
2019–2020	→ Pescara (loan)	7	(0)
2020–2021	→ Carrarese (loan)	25	(1)
2021–2022	→ Turris (loan)	28	(3)
2022–2023	→ Fidelis Andria (loan)	25	(0)
2023–2024	→ Turris (loan)	11	(0)
2024–	Teramo	0	(0)
- * Club domestic league appearances and goals as of 5 May 2024

Fabian Pavone (born 5 February 2000) is an Italian football player who plays for Serie D club Teramo.

== Club career ==
He is a product of Pescara youth teams and made one bench appearance for the senior squad in April 2019.

On 29 June 2019, he signed a 5-year contract with Serie A club Parma. On 31 July 2019, Parma loaned him back to Pescara for the 2019–20 season.

He made his Serie B debut for Pescara on 29 October 2019 in a game against Juve Stabia. He substituted Luca Palmiero in the 75th minute.

On 8 September 2020 he went to Carrarese on loan.

On 18 July 2021 he joined Turris on loan. On 7 July 2022, Pavone moved on a new loan to Fidelis Andria. On 25 July 2023, he returned to Turris on a new loan.

On 5 July 2024, Pavone signed with Teramo in Serie D.
