= Mattia Sprocati =

Italian footballer (born 1993)

Personal information
- Date of birth: 28 April 1993 (age 33)
- Place of birth: Monza, Italy
- Height: 1.78 m (5 ft 10 in)
- Position: Midfielder

Senior career*
Years	Team	Apps	(Gls)
2011–2012	Pavia	3	(0)
2012	→ Parma (loan)	0	(0)
2012–2015	Parma	0	(0)
2012–2013	→ Reggiana (loan)	26	(2)
2013–2014	→ Perugia (loan)	26	(4)
2014–2015	→ Crotone (loan)	4	(0)
2015	→ Pro Vercelli (loan)	14	(3)
2015–2017	Pro Vercelli	27	(1)
2017	→ Salernitana (loan)	14	(2)
2017–2018	Salernitana	33	(10)
2018–2019	Lazio	0	(0)
2018–2019	→ Parma (loan)	16	(1)
2019–2022	Parma	21	(1)
2022	Südtirol	0	(0)
- * Club domestic league appearances and goals as of 6 May 2022

Mattia Sprocati (born 28 April 1993) is an Italian professional footballer who plays as a midfielder.

== Career ==
Sprocati joined Parma on loan from Pavia in January 2012. He went on to sign for the Serie A club in a definitive deal on 2 July in the same year and was immediately loaned out to Reggiana.

On 10 July 2014, he was signed by Crotone.

=== Pro Vercelli ===
On 14 January 2015, Sprocati moved to Pro Vercelli from Crotone in a temporary deal, with Kelvin Matute moved to opposite direction temporary. On 2 July Pro Vercelli signed Sprocati outright from Parma, in a three-year contract.

On 30 January 2017, he was signed by Salernitana in a temporary deal.

=== Lazio & Parma ===
On 29 June 2018, Sprocati moved to Lazio on a five-year contract. On 17 August 2018, Sprocati was loaned to Parma with an option to buy.

Parma redeemed the player at the end of the season. Sprocati started the 2019–20 season well, scoring four goals in a 14–1 pre-season win against ASV Prad. He made only one league appearance in the 2020–21 season, was removed from Parma's squad in February 2021 and did not appear from the club for the rest of his contract.

=== Südtirol ===
On 4 July 2022, Sprocati joined Südtirol on a one-season contract, with an option to extend for two more years. On 28 November 2022, Sprocati had his contract terminated by mutual consent.
