= Liam Henderson =

Scottish footballer (born 1996)

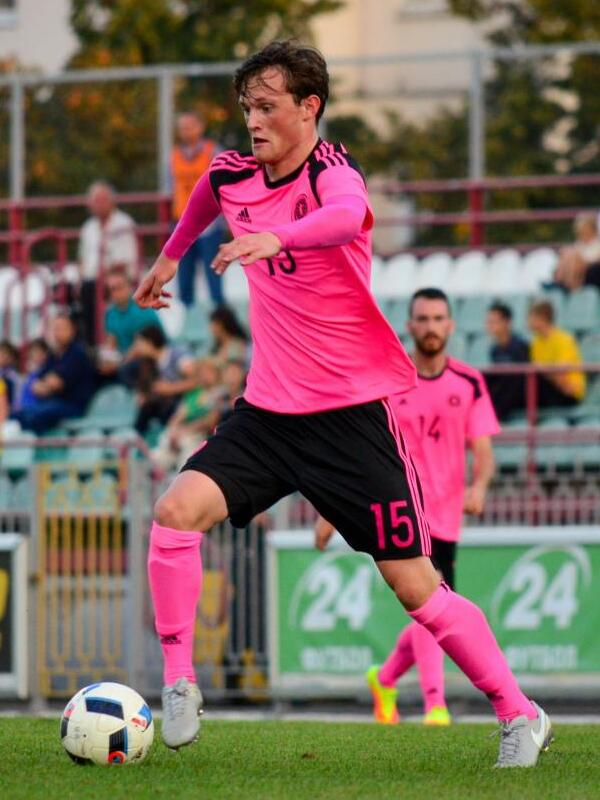
- Henderson playing for Scotland U21s in 2016

Personal information
- Date of birth: 25 April 1996 (age 30)
- Place of birth: Livingston, Scotland
- Height: 1.83 m (6 ft 0 in)
- Position: Central midfielder

Team information
- Current team: Sampdoria
- Number: 6

Youth career
- 2008–2013: Celtic

Senior career*
Years	Team	Apps	(Gls)
2013–2018	Celtic	29	(3)
2015	→ Rosenborg (loan)	9	(3)
2015–2016	→ Hibernian (loan)	32	(5)
2018	Bari	18	(2)
2018–2020	Hellas Verona	27	(3)
2020	→ Empoli (loan)	15	(1)
2020–2021	Lecce	38	(3)
2021–2025	Empoli	100	(2)
2023–2024	→ Palermo (loan)	30	(1)
2025–	Sampdoria	39	(4)

International career^{‡}
2011–2012	Scotland U16	9	(1)
2012–2013	Scotland U17	6	(0)
2013–2015	Scotland U19	13	(3)
2015–2017	Scotland U21	9	(0)
- * Club domestic league appearances and goals as of 28 October 2026 ‡ National team caps and goals as of 18:49, 25 February 2019 (GMT)

Liam Henderson (born 25 April 1996) is a Scottish professional footballer who plays as a central midfielder for Serie B club Sampdoria.

Henderson began his senior career at Celtic, winning the 2015 Scottish League Cup Final, and the 2016–17 Scottish Premiership. On loan at Norwegian club Rosenborg, he won the 2015 Norwegian league and cup double. On loan and after coming on at 2–1 down as a 70th minute substitute, he delivered two assists from corner kicks in the 2016 Scottish Cup Final in the comeback 3–2 win over Rangers. That ended Hibernian's 114 year wait to lift the Scottish Cup for the third time.

Playing in Italy since 2018, Henderson has also played for Bari, Hellas Verona, Lecce and Palermo. In each of his six seasons in which he has played 2nd divisional football, he ended the season playing in promotional play-offs (with Hibs and each of his five Italian clubs). In these six campaigns he succeeded once, when Verona won 2019 promotion from Serie B. He holds numerous appearance records for Scotsmen playing professional football in Italy, including the first Scot to play in 100 men's Serie A games.

Henderson captained Scotland up to and including under-21 among his 37 youth international caps.

== Club career ==
Henderson started his football career with Broxburn Athletic before joining Celtic.

=== Celtic ===
==== 2013–14: First team debut ====
Henderson signed for Celtic in 2008. He featured for the club's development squad in midfield and was included in the first team squad for their pre-season trip to Germany in the summer of 2013. He played pre-season at home versus Ukrainian side Sevastopol, beside higher profile debutants Virgil van Dijk and Amido Baldé. In 2013–14 Henderson played at both under-20 level and in the UEFA Youth League.

His competitive first-team début, aged 17, was on 6 December 2013. He was subbed on in Celtic's 5–0 league win at Motherwell. On 13 March 2014, Henderson's first competitive match start was in a 3–0 league win at Kilmarnock. Henderson scored his first Celtic goal on 26 March 2014. This was Celtic's second in a 5–1 league clinching win at Partick Thistle. His March form won him the SPFL Young Player of the Month award for that month. Manager Neil Lennon commented, "He's been absolutely excellent", and "his attitude to work is fantastic, and there's certainly a willingness on his part to get better". All of his 8 competitive first team games that season were in the Premiership (2 games short of the minimum 10 required to be awarded a winner's medal).

==== 2014–15: Loan to Rosenborg ====
Henderson made 15 Celtic first team appearances in all competitions in 2014/15. He scored with a left-footed shot on the turn at Hamilton Academical on 17 January 2015. He replaced Stuart Armstrong on 75 minutes to assist John Guidetti's 93rd-minute equaliser in a 3–3 Europa League first leg home tie versus Inter. Henderson was an unused sub when Inter went through after winning the return game 1–0. He was subbed on in the 82nd minute of Celtic's 2–0 League Cup Final win over Dundee United.

By the end of March, Henderson had nine appearances in Celtic's 28 Premiership games so far that season. He needed one more appearance from Celtic's remaining 10 Premiership games that season, for him to reach the minimum 10 appearances needed to qualify for a winner's medal. However, on 31 March last day of the Norwegian transfer window, he gave up that medal opportunity and instead signed a three-month loan deal with Rosenborg. He was 18 at the time this, and this was his first move overseas.

Henderson debuted for his new club on 12 April when he was subbed on in the second half in a 6–0 win at Haugesund. After his home debut substitute league appearance versus Strømsgodset, his first start in Norway was on 22 April in a Norwegian Cup tie at lower league Vuku. He scored his first Rosenborg goal, opening the scoring on 8 minutes with a right-footed strike. His team won 3–0. On 25 April, on his 19th birthday, he was subbed on at Viking to score twice within 10 minutes. Rosenborg won 4–1.

After 9 league and 4 cup appearances and scoring 4 goals, Henderson left Rosenborg at the end of June 2015. He was positive about his time in Norway stating, "It was a great experience, playing in a different league and in a foreign country." Rosenborg clinched the league title on 25 October 2015. He had made enough appearances to qualify for a league medal. Rosenborg also won the 2015 Norwegian Football Cup. He qualified for a cup medal, with rules in Norway making a player eligible for a medal by playing during the cup run.

==== 2015–16: Loan to Hibernian ====
Aged 19, on 14 August 2015, Henderson signed a three-year contract with Celtic. At the same time he moved on loan to Hibernian, the team supported by his family. He debuted for Hibs the next day, subbed on after 69 minutes for Dan Carmichael in a 1–0 home league win over Morton. On 12 September, he scored his first Hibs goal, the opener in a 3–0 win over Alloa Athletic. Jason Cummings and John McGinn also scored. A week later, Henderson registered the game's only goal with a curling in a free kick against Livingston. Manager Alan Stubbs described the goal as "worthy of winning any game".

Henderson played in that season's League Cup Final. Hibs lost 2–1 to a 90th minute Ross County winner by Alex Schalk.

Hibs played at Hearts in the 2015–16 Scottish Cup round of 16, coming from two down to draw 2–2. Hibs won the home replay 1–0. Henderson was prominent in both games. Hibs defeated Inverness Caledonian Thistle 2–1 in the round of 8, with Henderson heavily involved creating Anthony Stokes' second goal.

Henderson subbed on after 70 mins replacing Liam Fontaine, with Hibs 2–1 down to Rangers in the 2016 Scottish Cup Final. Henderson delivered both corner kicks to assist Stokes' equalising 2nd goal, and David Gray's stoppage time 3–2 winner. This was Hibs' first Scottish Cup trophy win since 1902, 114 years before. Henderson's contribution has been cemented in Hibs club folklore, thanks to Ian Crocker's television commentary. Edinburgh Live reported in 2019, "Liam Henderson’s corner is now probably just as famous as the end result. Swinging the ball in the from the right, Crocker provided the now iconic line “It’s Liam Henderson to deliver” that has even inspired numerous tattoos since.

Hibernian ended the league season 3rd in Scotland's second tier behind Rangers and Falkirk, to qualify for Henderson's first experience playing in the end-of-season play-offs. Hibs eliminated Raith Rovers 2–1 (on aggregate) in the play-offs, before losing 5–4 (on aggregate) to Falkirk. Henderson started three and was subbed on in one of the four play-off games. He scored in the 2nd leg of 2–2 home draw with Falkirk.

==== 2016–17: Return to Celtic ====
Under new Celtic manager, Brendan Rodgers, Henderson made his first starting appearance of the season on 15 October 2016 in a 2–0 league win over Motherwell. By the end of the season he had made six starts, with a further seven substitute appearances to bring his total to 13 games. He played in 10 league games this season, reaching for the first time the minimum number required to qualify for a Scottish league winner's medal.

==== 2017–18 ====
By January 2018, his only competitive first-team football of the 2017–18 season was 23 substitute minutes at home to Dundee in October.

=== Bari ===
Aged 21, Henderson, after a successful trial, signed for head coach Fabio Grosso at Serie B club Bari on 17 January 2018. The undisclosed fee was later reported as £115,000. He made his debut on 28 January, playing for the first hour in a 4–0 home league defeat to Empoli. On 24 February, he scored his first goal for Bari, the opener in a 2–1 win over Ternana, and provided the assist for Luca Marrone's second-half winner.

After Bari ended the season 7th, Henderson started in the end of season play-off quarter-final at Cittadella who had finished sixth. Bari were eliminated, drawing the game 2–2 after extra-time with 3 of Henderson's team mates sent off in the last six of the 120 minutes. He became a free agent after Bari were declared bankrupt at the season's end.

=== Hellas Verona ===
Aged 22, on 3 August 2018, Henderson followed Grosso that summer to again sign for him, this time on a four-year contract with Serie B Hellas Verona. Experienced 25 cap ex-Italy internationalist, Giampaolo Pazzini, was club captain during the season. Verona made a strong start to the season, winning their opening five games. Henderson scored his first Verona goal in a 2–1 win over Crotone on 22 September 2018. Grosso praised Henderson's versatility and the "timing of his runs into the [penalty] box".

Verona won the 2019 Serie B promotion play-offs for promotion to Serie A. Henderson and Samuel Gustafson both started as two of the three midfielders in all 5 of Verona's play-off games. Mattia Zaccagni made up their midfield trio in the first play-off game before missing the next 3 games completely. Verona won 4–1 after extra-time at home to Perugia, 1–0 on aggregate versus Pescara, and 3–2 on aggregate versus Cittadella. Zaccagni returned to the squad and scored the opener after starting Verona's fifth game of the play-offs, the 3–0 home win vs. Cittadella.

Henderson started Verona's opening match of the 2019–20 Serie A season, a 1–1 home draw with Bologna. Joe Baker was raised in Scotland and self-identified as Scots. However, Liverpool-born Baker was only eligible due to international football rules at the time for his country of birth, England, where he lived for the first six weeks of his life. Hence, that game against Bologna made Henderson the fourth Scotsman to play in the Italian Football Championship since its re-brand in 1929 to Serie A. That was after Denis Law (Baker's 1961/62 Torino team mate), Joe Jordan and Graeme Souness and the first since Souness played for Sampdoria 33 years before in 1986.

Henderson started in his first Serie A victory, 1–0 at Lecce on 1 September 2019. Matteo Pessina scored. Henderson's fourth and last Serie A game for Verona was a 2–1 defeat at Inter on 9 November 2019. That placed Verona 10th in Serie A at the time. Henderson only played in five Verona games that half-season, in a squad in which midfielders, Pessina, Zaccagni, Miguel Veloso, Sofyan Amrabat, Darko Lazović and Valerio Verre all played in at least 33 senior competitive first team games. They finished 9th in Serie A.

In total at Verona, Henderson played in four Serie A games, 23+5 Serie B+Serie B play-off games, and 3 in the Coppa.

==== Loan to Empoli ====
Aged 23, on 17 January 2020, he joined coach Roberto Muzzi at Serie B club Empoli, on loan with an option to buy. Empoli were in relegation threatening 16th at the time. Muzzi was sacked 9 days later after a tenure of only 10 weeks, he was replaced by Pasquale Marino.

Henderson started 15 of the 16 games he played in that half-season at Empoli, in a midfield trio regularly also containing future Italy internationalists, Davide Frattesi and Samuele Ricci. Henderson scored his first Empoli goal with the equaliser on 1 February 2020 in a 3–1 Serie B home win versus Crotone. Empoli rallied to finish the season in 7th place, allowing him to again start in the end of season play-off quarter-final at the team who finished sixth, this time AC ChievoVerona. Empoli were eliminated by drawing 1–1 after extra time.

=== Lecce ===
Aged 24, on 11 September 2020, Henderson signed for Eugenio Corini on a four-year contract with Serie B side Lecce. With team mates including winter signings Morten Hjulmand and Christian Maggio, at the end of 2020–21 Lecce made the play-offs by finishing fourth. He played in both games (starting once), when they lost in the play-off semi-finals 2–1 on aggregate to Venezia. He left Lecce after one season.

=== Return to Empoli ===
Aged 25, in August 2021, Henderson returned to Serie A for the first time since his spell at Verona. He transferred to Empoli who had been promoted as Serie B champions in Henderson's season at Lecce. He signed for Aurelio Andreazzoli, newly returned for his 3rd spell as Empoli Head Coach.

His first Serie A goal was an equaliser at home on 9 January 2022 versus Sassuolo. If again discounting Joe Baker, that goal made Henderson the fifth Scot to score in Italy's Serie A. Henderson was again behind Law, Jordan and Souness, and now also Aaron Hickey who had scored 4 Serie A goals for Bologna that season before Henderson's strike versus Sassuolo. Empoli lost that Sassuolo game 5–1, conceding three goals after Mattia Viti's 60th minute sending off. Henderson scored in Serie A again that season, on 24 April 2022 at home versus Napoli. Henderson joined the fray as a 61st-minute substitute with his team 2–0 down. His 80th-minute goal was the first of three his team scored to come back to win 3–2.

Other stand out wins he played in that 2021-22 season were 1–0 victories at each of Juventus, Napoli (for a seasonal home and away double victory), and Atalanta. With Empoli 2–0 and 3–2 up at Lazio in January, Lazio's Sergej Milinković-Savić's 90+3rd minute goal earned a 3–3 draw. Henderson and goalkeeper Guglielmo Vicario were the only two to play in all 38 of Empoli's Serie A games that season. 19 year old Kristjan Asllani had his Serie A breakthrough playing in midfield with Henderson that season, earning a move to Inter.

On 9 October 2022, he joined Souness as the second Scot to reach 50 men's Serie A appearances, when Empoli drew 1–1 at Napoli. On 4 February 2023, in a 2–0 defeat at Roma, Henderson's 57th Serie A appearance meant he surpassed Souness' tally of 56 to become the Scot to play in the most Serie A games. His Serie A wins that season included 1–0 at Internazionale and 4–1 at home versus Juventus. He played in 64 Serie A games in this two-year spell at Empoli, taking his career Serie A appearances to 68 at this point. Empoli finished 14th in Serie A in both of these seasons. Henderson also notched 4 Coppa games in this Empoli stint.

==== Loan to Palermo ====
Aged 27, on 28 August 2023, Henderson again signed for Eugenio Corini, this time at Serie B Palermo, on loan from Empoli with an option to buy. Henderson scored his first Palermo goal with the 47th minute opener in the 2–0 win at Modena on 7 October 2023. This was his only goal of that season and his 10th Serie B career goal. That equalled the Serie B career goals record by a Scotsman set by Joe Jordan.

Palermo finished that season 6th in Serie B, qualifying for the promotion play-offs preliminary round. This continued Henderson's record of playing in end of season play-offs in each of the six seasons in which he played in a 2nd tier division, each time with a different club. He subbed on at home defeating Sampdoria 2–0. He was unused from the bench when Palermo lost in the semi-finals 3–1 on aggregate to Venezia.

=== Third spell at Empoli ===
Aged 28, Henderson returned in July 2024 from his Palermo loan. In his loan season at Palermo, Empoli retained their Serie A status through a last match of the season, with M'Baye Niang scoring an injury-time winner at home vs. Roma.

The first game of his return was a 4–1 home Coppa Italia win versus Catanzaro. Under new Head Coach, Roberto D'Aversa, this game sparked Empoli's 8 Coppa & League game unbeaten start to the season. The first Serie A game of his return was the goalless home draw versus Monza on 17 August 2024. The unbeaten run also included the 2–1 Coppa win at Torino and Serie A wins at Roma (2–0) and Cagliari (2–1), as well as the Serie A draws versus Bologna (home, 1–1), Juventus (away, 0–0) and Fiorentina (away, 0–0). Henderson started all 8 games. In the absence of Alberto Grassi and Ardian Ismajli, Henderson deputised as Empoli captain in the Coppa win in Torino. Empoli were sixth in Serie A after six games with only Juventus bettering Empoli's 2 goals conceded defensive record. The unbeaten run ended in Empoli's ninth game of the season, losing 2–1 at Lazio. Subbed on after 65 minutes, this was Empoli's first competitive first team game of the season Henderson didn't start.

Henderson scored in the Coppa Italia penalty shootout away wins at Fiorentina (round of 16, 4 December 2024) and Juventus (quarter-final, 27 February 2025). Henderson assisted Sebastiano Esposito's 75th minute 2–2 equaliser vs. Fiorentina. That win at Juve was Henderson's third career victory against Italy's most successful club. Henderson's 7.0 Sofascore rating was his team's highest in the game. That win put Empoli into the competition's semi-final for the 1st time since their 1920 formation and the Coppa's 1922 launch. Henderson was suspended for the semi-final 1st leg 3–0 home defeat by Bologna. Henderson joined the fray as a 62nd minute sub in the away 2nd leg 2–1 defeat with Empoli defeated 5–1 on aggregate. In doing so, Henderson became the 4th Scotsman to play in a Coppa Italia semi-final, after Jordan, Souness and Bologna's, Lewis Ferguson. Ferguson played in the 1st leg of the semi vs. Empoli in which Henderson was suspended. Empoli's semi-final conquerors were eventual winners, winning the final 1–0 versus Milan.

Henderson played in the 2–2 home draw vs. Venezia on 20 April 2025. He assisted Jacopo Fazzini's 59th-minute opening goal in that game. This was Henderson's 96th Empoli Serie A game. Added to his 4 Verona Serie A appearances, this made him the first Scot to play in 100 men's Serie A games.

Henderson played on 25 May 2025 in Empoli's last game of the season, at home to Verona. Empoli needed a win to have any chance of staying up. Henderson subbed off in 60 mins at 1–1. Empoli lost 2–1 for Henderson's first career relegation. This was his 100th Empoli Serie A game. That made him the first Scot to play 100 men's Serie games for one club. Added to four 2019 Verona Serie A games he played, he has 104 career total Serie A appearances at this point. That is the new record appearances for Scots in men's Serie A, above Lewis Ferguson's 79 Serie A appearances at this point.

=== Sampdoria ===
On 7 August 2025, Henderson signed a two-season contract with Serie B club Sampdoria.

== International career ==
Henderson captained the Scotland national under-17 football team. He was part of the under 19 squad in Belarus in October 2013. Scotland qualified from three 2014 UEFA European Under-19 Championship elite qualification games there. Henderson was unused from the bench when Ryan Gauld scored in the 1–1 draw versus Latvia. Denny Johnstone scored both Scotland goals when Henderson then played in the 1–0 win versus hosts, Belarus, and in the 1–1 draw versus Germany. Henderson played in all three elite round matches in May 2014. However, Scotland finished bottom of the group with one draw and two 1 goal defeats.

In October 2014, Henderson played in three 2015 UEFA European Under-19 Championship qualifying games in Kaunas. He scored a penalty to put Scotland 2–0 ahead versus Finland who scored twice in the final 14 minutes to draw. He then played in draws versus Lithuania and Norway. Unbeaten Scotland qualified for the Elite Round as the best ranked third-placed team. In the three Elite Round games played in Austria in March 2015, he scored both Scottish goals in the 2–1 win over host team, Austria. He missed the 0-0 draw with Italy, then played in the last game versus Croatia. Oli McBurnie scored for the Scots to draw 1–1. However, Scotland unbeaten in all 6 games they played at the two levels, were eliminated by Austria's late winner against Italy.

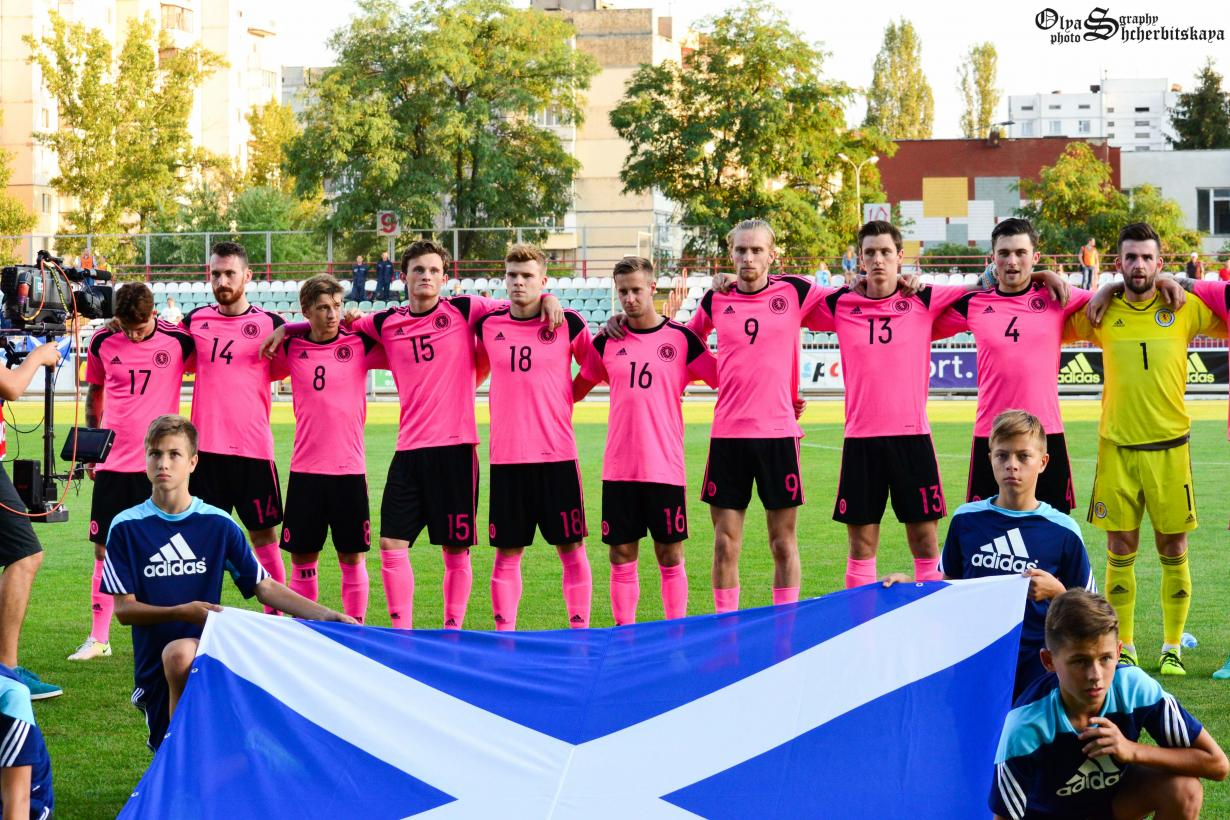
Henderson (number 15) and the under 21s pre-match in Ukraine, 6 September 2016.

On 13 November 2015, Henderson played for Scotland under-21s in a 2–2 draw, European Under-21 Championship qualifier versus Ukraine at St Mirren Park, Paisley. Over the next year, he played in a further seven U21 internationals. His last Under 21s game was on 28 March 2017. He was captain in a 0–0 friendly draw against Estonia in Paisley.

== Personal life ==
Henderson's father, Nicky, played football for nine senior Scottish clubs in the 1990s and early 2000s. Liam's younger brother Ewan, followed Liam through the Celtic youth system before also playing for Hibs. Ewan in July 2024 joined Beerschot in Belgium. Ewan joined EFL League One side Wycombe Wanderers in July 2025.

== Career statistics ==
As of match played 27 October 2026

Appearances and goals by club, season and competition
Club	Season	League			National cup		League cup		Europe		Other		Total	
Club	Season	Division	Apps	Goals	Apps	Goals	Apps	Goals	Apps	Goals	Apps	Goals	Apps	Goals
Celtic	2013–14	Scottish Premiership	8	1	0	0	0	0	0	0	—		8	1
Celtic	2014–15	Scottish Premiership	9	1	1	0	1	0	3	0	—		14	1
Celtic	2015–16	Scottish Premiership	1	0	0	0	0	0	0	0	—		1	0
Celtic	2016–17	Scottish Premiership	10	1	1	0	1	0	1	0	—		13	1
Celtic	2017–18	Scottish Premiership	1	0	0	0	0	0	0	0	—		1	0
Celtic	Total		29	3	2	0	2	0	4	0	0	0	37	3
Rosenborg (loan)	2015	Tippeligaen	9	3	4	1	0	0	0	0	—		13	4
Hibernian (loan)	2015–16	Scottish Championship	32	5	7	0	5	0	—		4 (Note: Appearances in Scottish Premiership Play-offs)	1	48	6
Bari	2017–18	Serie B	18	2	0	0	—		—		1 (Note: Appearance(s) in Serie B promotion play-offs)	—	19	2
Hellas Verona	2018–19	Serie B	23	3	2	0	—		—		5	0	30	3
Hellas Verona	2019–20	Serie A	4	0	1	0	—		—		—		5	0
Hellas Verona	Total		27	3	3	0	0	0	0	0	5	0	35	3
Empoli (loan)	2019–20	Serie B	15	1	0	0	—		—		1	0	16	1
Lecce	2020–21	Serie B	38	3	2	1	—		—		2	0	42	4
Empoli	2021–22	Serie A	38	2	2	0	—		—		—		40	2
Empoli	2022–23	Serie A	25	0	1	0	—		—		—		26	0
Empoli	2023–24	Serie A	1	0	1	0	—		—		—		2	0
Empoli	2024–25	Serie A	36	0	4	0	—		—		—		40	0
Empoli	Total		100	2	8	0	0	0	0	0	0	0	108	2
Palermo (loan)	2023–24	Serie B	30	1	0	0	—		—		1	0	31	1
Sampdoria	2025–26	Serie B	30	2	1	1	—		—		—		31	3
Sampdoria	2026–27	Serie B	9	2	1	0	—		—		—		10	2
Sampdoria	Total		39	4	2	1	0	0	0	0	0	0	41	5
Career total			337	27	28	3	7	0	4	0	14	1	390	31

== Honours ==
Celtic

- Scottish Premiership: 2016–17
- Scottish League Cup: 2014–15

Rosenborg

- Tippeligaen: 2015
- Norwegian Football Cup: 2015

Hibernian

- Scottish Cup: 2015–16
- Scottish League Cup runner-up: 2015–16

Hellas Verona

- Serie B Promotion Play-offs: 2019

Individual:

- SPFL Young Player of the Month: March 2014
