= 2023–24 Empoli FC season =

Empoli FC
2023–24 season
- Chairman: Fabrizio Corsi
- Head coach: Paolo Zanetti (until 19 September); Aurelio Andreazzoli (from 19 September to 15 January); Davide Nicola (from 15 January)
- Stadium: Stadio Carlo Castellani
- Serie A: 17th
- Coppa Italia: Round of 64
- Top goalscorer: League: M'Baye Niang (6); All: M'Baye Niang (6)
- Average home league attendance: 10,861
Home colours	Away colours	Third colours

The 2023–24 season was Empoli Football Club's 104th season in existence and third consecutive season in Serie A. They also competed in the Coppa Italia.

== Players ==
=== First-team squad ===
As of 1 February 2024

Note: Flags indicate national team as defined under FIFA eligibility rules; some limited exceptions apply. Players may hold more than one non-FIFA nationality.

No.	Pos.	Nation	Player
1	GK	ITA	Samuele Perisan
2	DF	GEO	Saba Goglichidze
3	DF	ITA	Giuseppe Pezzella
4	DF	POL	Sebastian Walukiewicz
5	MF	ITA	Alberto Grassi
7	FW	ALB	Stiven Shpendi (on loan from Cesena)
8	MF	UKR	Viktor Kovalenko (on loan from Atalanta)
9	FW	ITA	Francesco Caputo
10	FW	SEN	M'Baye Niang
11	FW	GHA	Emmanuel Gyasi
13	DF	NZL	Liberato Cacace
16	MF	ITA	Luca Belardinelli
17	FW	ITA	Alberto Cerri (on loan from Como)
18	MF	ROU	Răzvan Marin (on loan from Cagliari)

No.	Pos.	Nation	Player
19	DF	POL	Bartosz Bereszyński (on loan from Sampdoria)
20	FW	ITA	Matteo Cancellieri (on loan from Lazio)
21	MF	ITA	Jacopo Fazzini
23	FW	ITA	Mattia Destro
24	DF	NGR	Tyronne Ebuehi
25	GK	ITA	Elia Caprile (on loan from Napoli)
27	MF	POL	Szymon Żurkowski (on loan from Spezia)
28	FW	ITA	Nicolò Cambiaghi (on loan from Atalanta)
29	MF	MAR	Youssef Maleh (on loan from Lecce)
30	MF	ITA	Simone Bastoni (on loan from Spezia)
33	DF	ITA	Sebastiano Luperto (captain)
34	DF	ALB	Ardian Ismajli
99	GK	ALB	Etrit Berisha

=== Other players under contract ===
As of 2 February 2024

Note: Flags indicate national team as defined under FIFA eligibility rules; some limited exceptions apply. Players may hold more than one non-FIFA nationality.

No.	Pos.	Nation	Player
—	DF	ITA	Lorenzo Tonelli

=== Primavera ===
Note: Flags indicate national team as defined under FIFA eligibility rules; some limited exceptions apply. Players may hold more than one non-FIFA nationality.

No.	Pos.	Nation	Player
12	GK	ITA	Jacopo Seghetti
31	FW	ITA	Giacomo Corona (on loan from Palermo)
36	GK	ITA	Filippo Lapo Vertua

No.	Pos.	Nation	Player
38	DF	ITA	Gabriele Indragoli
39	MF	ITA	Andrea Sodero

=== Out on loan ===
As of 7 February 2024

Note: Flags indicate national team as defined under FIFA eligibility rules; some limited exceptions apply. Players may hold more than one non-FIFA nationality.

No.	Pos.	Nation	Player
—	GK	ITA	Niccolò Chiorra (at Lucchese until 30 June 2024)
—	GK	SLO	Lovro Štubljar (at Domzale until 30 June 2024)
—	DF	ITA	Samuele Angori (at Pontedera until 30 June 2024)
—	DF	FRA	Jordan Boli (at Carrarese until 30 June 2024)
—	DF	ITA	Francesco Donati (at Arezzo until 30 June 2024)
—	DF	ITA	Gabriele Guarino (at Modena until 30 June 2024)
—	DF	SLO	Petar Stojanović (at Sampdoria until 30 June 2024)
—	DF	ITA	Nicolò Evangelisti (at Pineto Calcio until 30 June 2024)
—	DF	ITA	Luca Marianucci (at Pro Sesto until 30 June 2024)

No.	Pos.	Nation	Player
—	DF	ITA	Giacomo Siniega (at Torres until 30 June 2024)
—	MF	SUI	Nicolas Haas (at Luzern until 30 June 2024)
—	MF	SCO	Liam Henderson (at Palermo until 30 June 2024)
—	MF	ITA	Lorenzo Ignacchiti (at Pontedera until 30 June 2024)
—	MF	POL	Iwo Kaczmarski (at Miedź Legnica until 30 June 2025)
—	MF	ITA	Duccio Degli Innocenti (at Lecco until 30 June 2024)
—	MF	ITA	Alessio Rossi (at Foggia until 30 June 2024)
—	FW	SWE	Emmanuel Ekong (at Istra 1961 until 30 June 2024)
—	FW	ITA	Davide Merola (at Pescara until 30 June 2024)

== Transfers ==
=== In ===
Pos.	Player	Transferred from	Fee	Date	Source
MF	(Italy) Filippo Ranocchia	(Italy) Juventus	Loan	17 July 2023	
FW	(Ghana) Emmanuel Gyasi	(Italy) Spezia	Undisclosed	21 July 2023	
GK	(Italy) Elia Caprile	(Italy) Napoli	Loan	24 July 2023	
DF	(Poland) Bartosz Bereszyński	(Italy) Sampdoria	Loan	22 August 2023	
FW	(Italy) Nicolò Cambiaghi	(Italy) Atalanta	Loan	25 August 2023	
MF	(Ukraine) Viktor Kovalenko	(Italy) Atalanta	Loan	25 August 2023	
GK	(Albania) Etrit Berisha	(Italy) Torino	Undisclosed	29 August 2023	
MF	(Morocco) Youssef Maleh	(Italy) Lecce	Loan	31 August 2023	
DF	(Georgia (country)) Saba Goglichidze	(Georgia (country)) Torpedo Kutaisi	€450,000	6 January 2024	
MF	(Poland) Szymon Żurkowski	(Italy) Spezia	Loan	9 January 2024	
FW	(Senegal) M'Baye Niang	(Turkey) Adana Demirspor	€250,000	31 January 2024	

=== Out ===
Pos.	Player	Transferred to	Fee	Date	Source
GK	(Italy) Guglielmo Vicario	(England) Tottenham Hotspur	€17,200,000	1 July 2023	
MF	(Italy) Fabiano Parisi	(Italy) Fiorentina	€10,000,000	14 July 2023	
MF	(Italy) Filippo Bandinelli	(Italy) Spezia	Undisclosed	21 July 2023	
GK	(Italy) Niccolò Chiorra	(Italy) Lucchese	Loan	24 July 2023	
MF	(Scotland) Liam Henderson	(Italy) Palermo	Loan	28 August 2023	
GK	(Slovenia) Lovro Štubljar	(Slovenia) Domžale	Loan	5 January 2024	

== Pre-season and friendlies ==
Win Draw Loss

26 July 2023 Friendly	1. FC Heidenheim (Germany)	2–1	(Italy) Empoli	Kirchbichl, Austria
18:00 CEST (UTC+2)	Pieringer 40'; Pick 43'		Ekong 90'	Stadium: SVK-Arena; Attendance: 500

29 July 2023 Friendly	Empoli (Italy)	2–1	(France) Lille	Kufstein, Austria
14:00 CEST (UTC+2)				Stadium: Kufstein-Arena

5 August 2023 Friendly	SC Freiburg (Germany)	2–0	(Italy) Empoli	Freiburg, Germany
15:30 CEST (UTC+2)	Sallai (penalty missed) 22'; Höler 34'; Gregoritsch 55'			Stadium: Europa-Park Stadion; Attendance: 23,600

5 August 2023 Friendly	SC Freiburg (Germany)	1–2	(Italy) Empoli	Freiburg, Germany
17:30 CEST (UTC+2)	Gulde 27'		Kaczmarski 30'; Piccoli 43'	Stadium: Europa-Park Stadion; Attendance: 23,600
Note: Match was played in one period of 45 minutes.

14 October 2023 Friendly	Empoli (Italy)	Cancelled	(Italy) Modena	Vinci
14:30 CEST (UTC+2)				Stadium: Centro Sportivo di Petroio
Note: The match was cancelled due to unavailability of players.

== Competitions ==
=== Overall record ===
Competition	First match	Last match	Starting round	Final position	Record							
Competition	First match	Last match	Starting round	Final position	Pld	W	D	L	GF	GA	GD	Win %
Serie A	19 August 2023	26 May 2024	Matchday 1	17th	38	9	9	20	29	54	−25	23.68
Coppa Italia	12 August 2023		Round of 64	Round of 64	1	0	0	1	1	2	−1	0.00
Total					39	9	9	21	30	56	−26	23.08

Source: Soccerway

=== Serie A ===
==== League table ====
Pos	Team	Pld	W	D	L	GF	GA	GD	Pts	Qualification or relegation
15	Udinese	38	6	19	13	37	53	−16	37	
16	Cagliari	38	8	12	18	42	68	−26	36 (Note: Cagliari finished ahead of Empoli on head-to-head points: Cagliari 0–0 Empoli, Empoli 0–1 Cagliari.)	
17	Empoli	38	9	9	20	29	54	−25	36	
18	Frosinone (R)	38	8	11	19	44	69	−25	35	Relegation to Serie B
19	Sassuolo (R)	38	7	9	22	43	75	−32	30	Relegation to Serie B

Source: Serie A
Rules for classification: 1) Points; 2) Tiebreaker for Champions team and third relegated team; 3) Head-to-head points; 4) Head-to-head goal difference; 5) Goal difference; 6) Goals scored; 7) Draw.
(Note: Head-to-head record is used only after all the matches between the teams in question have been played)
(R) Relegated

==== Results summary ====
Overall								Home						Away					
Pld	W	D	L	GF	GA	GD	Pts	W	D	L	GF	GA	GD	W	D	L	GF	GA	GD
38	9	9	20	29	54	−25	36	5	5	9	15	23	−8	4	4	11	14	31	−17

Source: Serie A

==== Results by round ====
Round	1	2	3	4	5	6	7	8	9	10	11	12	13	14	15	16	17	18	19	20	21	22	23	24	25	26	27	28	29	30	31	32	33	34	35	36	37	38
Ground	H	A	H	A	H	H	A	H	A	H	A	A	H	A	H	A	H	A	H	A	H	A	H	A	H	A	H	A	H	A	H	A	H	A	H	A	A	H
Result	L	L	L	L	L	W	L	D	W	L	L	W	L	D	D	L	L	D	L	L	W	D	D	W	D	W	L	L	L	L	W	L	W	L	D	L	D	W
Position	14	19	20	20	20	19	19	18	17	18	19	17	18	17	18	18	19	19	19	19	19	19	19	16	16	13	14	17	17	18	16	17	16	17	17	18	18	17

Source: Serie A
A = Away; H = Home; W = Win; D = Draw; L = Loss

==== Matches ====
The league fixtures were unveiled on 5 July 2023.

19 August 2023 1	Empoli	0–1	Hellas Verona	Empoli
18:30 CEST (UTC+2)	Cacace (yellow card) 66'; Grassi (yellow card) 68'	Report	Duda (yellow card) 44'; Magnani (yellow card) 58'; Bonazzoli 75'	Stadium: Stadio Carlo Castellani; Attendance: 7,940; Referee: Luca Massimi

26 August 2023 2	Monza	2–0	Empoli	Monza
18:30 CEST (UTC+2)	Izzo (yellow card) 8'; Colpani 45', 53'	Report	Baldanzi (yellow card) 1'; Haas (yellow card) 90+5'	Stadium: U-Power Stadium; Attendance: 8,155; Referee: Gianluca Aureliano

3 September 2023 3	Empoli	0–2	Juventus	Empoli
20:45 CEST (UTC+2)	Bereszyński (yellow card) 43'; Gyasi (yellow card) 86'; Destro (yellow card) 90+8'	Report	Locatelli (yellow card) 15'; Danilo 24'; Vlahović (penalty missed) 39', (yellow card) 48'; Miretti (yellow card) 49'; Chiesa 82'	Stadium: Stadio Carlo Castellani; Attendance: 15,702; Referee: Giovanni Ayroldi

17 September 2023 4	Roma	7–0	Empoli	Rome
20:45 CEST (UTC+2)	Dybala 2' (pen.), 55', (yellow card) 38'; Sanches 8', (yellow card) 39'; Grassi 35' (o.g.); Cristante 80'; Lukaku 82'; Mancini 86'	Report	Cancellieri (yellow card) 39'; Maleh (yellow card) 58'	Stadium: Stadio Olimpico; Attendance: 61,443; Referee: Juan Luca Sacchi

24 September 2023 5	Empoli	0–1	Internazionale	Empoli
12:30 CEST (UTC+2)	Pezzella (yellow card) 33'; Maleh (yellow card) 62'	Report	Acerbi (yellow card) 26'; Dimarco 51'; Bastoni (yellow card) 65'	Stadium: Stadio Carlo Castellani; Attendance: 15,651; Referee: Matteo Marcenaro

27 September 2023 6	Empoli	1–0	Salernitana	Empoli
18:30 CEST (UTC+2)	Grassi (yellow card) 28'; Baldanzi 34'; Maleh (yellow card) 86'	Report	Maggiore (yellow card) 24'	Stadium: Stadio Carlo Castellani; Attendance: 7,979; Referee: Antonio Rapuano

1 October 2023 7	Bologna	3–0	Empoli	Bologna
12:30 CEST (UTC+2)	Orsolini 21', 66', 90+2'; Corazza (yellow card) 44'; El Azzouzi (yellow card) 58'	Report	Cacace (yellow card) 10'; Walukiewicz (yellow card) 39'; Ranocchia (yellow card) 45+3'; Cancellieri (yellow card) 81'	Stadium: Stadio Renato Dall'Ara; Attendance: 23,689; Referee: Fabio Maresca

6 October 2023 8	Empoli	0–0	Udinese	Empoli
18:30 CEST (UTC+2)	Maleh (yellow card) 56'	Report	Pereyra (yellow card) 66'; Pérez (yellow card) 84'	Stadium: Stadio Carlo Castellani; Attendance: 7,128; Referee: Michael Fabbri

23 October 2023 9	Fiorentina	0–2	Empoli	Florence
20:45 CEST (UTC+2)	Beltrán (yellow card) 77'	Report	Caputo 21'; Walukiewicz (yellow card) 52'; Cancellieri (yellow card) 71'; Fazzini (yellow card) 79'; Gyasi 81'	Stadium: Stadio Artemio Franchi; Attendance: 29,105; Referee: Federico Dionisi

30 October 2023 10	Empoli	0–3	Atalanta	Empoli
18:30 CET (UTC+1)	Maleh (yellow card) 33'; Cacace (yellow card) 35'; Gyasi (yellow card) 69'; Fazzini (yellow card) 85'	Report	Scamacca 5', 51'; Koopmeiners 29'	Stadium: Stadio Carlo Castellani; Attendance: 7,825; Referee: Luca Massimi

6 November 2023 11	Frosinone	2–1	Empoli	Frosinone
18:30 CET (UTC+1)	Barrenechea (yellow card) 34'; Reinier (yellow card) 42'; Lirola (yellow card) 45+1'; Çuni 58'; Ibrahimović 74'	Report	Gyasi (yellow card) 44'; Ranocchia (yellow card) 76'; Caputo 86'	Stadium: Stadio Benito Stirpe; Attendance: 14,755; Referee: Gianluca Manganiello

12 November 2023 12	Napoli	0–1	Empoli	Naples
12:30 CET (UTC+1)	Cajuste (yellow card) 90+3'	Report	Cancellieri (yellow card) 78'; Kovalenko 90+1'	Stadium: Stadio Diego Armando Maradona; Attendance: 50,500; Referee: Alessandro Prontera

26 November 2023 13	Empoli	3–4	Sassuolo	Empoli
15:00 CET (UTC+1)	Caputo 4' (o.g.); Fazzini (yellow card) 25', (goal) 30'; Maleh (yellow card) 31'; Viña 86' (o.g.); Gyasi (yellow card) 90+1'; Grassi (yellow card) 90+2'	Report	Pinamonti 12'; Matheus Henrique 22', (yellow card) 37'; Berardi (yellow card) 50', (goal) 66' (pen.), 90+2'	Stadium: Stadio Carlo Castellani; Attendance: 9,954; Referee: Simone Sozza

2 December 2023 14	Genoa	1–1	Empoli	Genoa
15:00 CET (UTC+1)	Malinovskyi 37', (yellow card) 56'; Vogliacco (yellow card) 87'; Badelj (yellow card) 90+2'	Report	Ranocchia (yellow card) 13'; Cancellieri 67'	Stadium: Stadio Luigi Ferraris; Attendance: 30,747; Referee: Gianluca Aureliano

11 December 2023 15	Empoli	1–1	Lecce	Empoli
18:30 CET (UTC+1)	Maleh (yellow card) 37'; Grassi (yellow card) 52'; Rafia 71' (o.g.)	Report	González (yellow card) 4'; Banda 64'; Ramadani (yellow card) 75'	Stadium: Stadio Carlo Castellani; Attendance: 7,152; Referee: Andrea Colombo

16 December 2023 16	Torino	1–0	Empoli	Turin
20:45 CET (UTC+1)	Zapata 25'; Linetty (yellow card) 45+4'; Bellanova (yellow card) 71'; Buongiorno (yellow card) 80'; Vlašić (yellow card) 85'	Report	Cacace (yellow card) 81'; Luperto (yellow card) 88'	Stadium: Stadio Olimpico Grande Torino; Attendance: 17,815; Referee: Livio Marinelli

22 December 2023 17	Empoli	0–2	Lazio	Empoli
18:30 CET (UTC+1)	Maldini (yellow card) 15'; Fazzini (yellow card) 45+1'; Bastoni (yellow card) 57'	Report	Guendouzi 9'; Patric (yellow card) 26'; Rovella (yellow card) 46'; Zaccagni 67'	Stadium: Stadio Carlo Castellani; Attendance: 8,800; Referee: Matteo Marchetti

30 December 2023 18	Cagliari	0–0	Empoli	Cagliari
15:00 CET (UTC+1)	Lapadula (yellow card) 29'; Viola (penalty missed) 82'	Report	Maleh (yellow card) 29'; Cacace (yellow card) 64'; Walukiewicz (yellow card) 80'	Stadium: Unipol Domus; Attendance: 16,125; Referee: Fabio Maresca

7 January 2024 19	Empoli	0–3	Milan	Empoli
12:30 CET (UTC+1)	Marin (yellow card) 81'	Report	Loftus-Cheek 11'; Giroud 31' (pen.); Calabria (yellow card) 41'; Jiménez (yellow card) 54'; Traorè 88'	Stadium: Stadio Carlo Castellani; Attendance: 15,009; Referee: Federico La Penna

13 January 2024 20	Hellas Verona	2–1	Empoli	Verona
18:00 CET (UTC+1)	Đurić 3'; Ngonge 56'; Duda (yellow card) 69' (yellow-red card) 87'; Coppola (yellow card) 77'; Tchatchoua (yellow card) 82'	Report	Żurkowski (yellow card) 58', (goal) 64'; Cambiaghi (yellow card) 78'; Cancellieri (yellow card) 90'	Stadium: Stadio Marcantonio Bentegodi; Attendance: 28,723; Referee: Daniele Doveri

21 January 2024 21	Empoli	3–0	Monza	Empoli
15:00 CET (UTC+1)	Żurkowski 13', 38', 73'; Bereszyński (yellow card) 49'	Report	Caldirola (yellow card) 70'; Mota (yellow card) 72'; Marí (yellow card) 90+2'	Stadium: Stadio Carlo Castellani; Attendance: 7,650; Referee: Antonio Giua

27 January 2024 22	Juventus	1–1	Empoli	Turin
18:00 CET (UTC+1)	Milik (red card) 16'; Vlahović 50'; Weah (yellow card) 90+3'	Report	Walukiewicz (yellow card) 20'; Baldanzi 70'	Stadium: Juventus Stadium; Attendance: 39,518; Referee: Livio Marinelli

3 February 2024 23	Empoli	0–0	Genoa	Empoli
15:00 CET (UTC+1)	Walukiewicz (yellow card) 53'; Cambiaghi (yellow card) 75'	Report	De Winter (yellow card) 66' (yellow-red card) 90+2'; Sabelli (yellow card) 73'	Stadium: Stadio Carlo Castellani; Attendance: 10,374; Referee: Ermanno Feliciani

9 February 2024 24	Salernitana	1–3	Empoli	Salerno
20:45 CET (UTC+1)	Zanoli (yellow card) 43'; Weissman 69'; Bašić (yellow card) 77'; Bradarić (yellow card) 90+4'	Report	Maleh (yellow card) 22'; Zanoli 23' (o.g.); Niang 88' (pen.); Cerri (yellow card) 90+4'; Cancellieri 90+4'	Stadium: Stadio Arechi; Attendance: 18,510; Referee: Maurizio Mariani

18 February 2024 25	Empoli	1–1	Fiorentina	Empoli
15:00 CET (UTC+1)	Gyasi (yellow card) 2'; Luperto (yellow card) 45+4'; Niang 56' (pen.); Żurkowski (yellow card) 73'	Report	Beltrán 30', (yellow card) 82'; Biraghi (yellow card) 70'	Stadium: Stadio Carlo Castellani; Attendance: 12,490; Referee: Luca Pairetto

24 February 2024 26	Sassuolo	2–3	Empoli	Reggio Emilia
15:00 CET (UTC+1)	Boloca (yellow card) 10'; Pinamonti 54' (pen.); Ferrari 77'	Report	Luperto 11'; Ismajli (yellow card) 54'; Cancellieri (yellow card) 56'; Niang 64' (pen.); Bastoni 90+4', (yellow card) 90+5'	Stadium: Mapei Stadium – Città del Tricolore; Attendance: 12,774; Referee: Gianluca Aureliano

3 March 2024 27	Empoli	0–1	Cagliari	Empoli
15:00 CET (UTC+1)		Report	Gaetano (yellow card) 17'; Jankto 69'; Mina (yellow card) 79'	Stadium: Stadio Carlo Castellani; Attendance: 11,223; Referee: Antonio Rapuano

10 March 2024 28	Milan	1–0	Empoli	Milan
15:00 CET (UTC+1)	Reijnders (yellow card) 26'; Pulisic 40'	Report	Fazzini (yellow card) 24'; Pezzella (yellow card) 53'; Żurkowski (yellow card) 65'; Cancellieri (yellow card) 80'	Stadium: San Siro; Attendance: 70,343; Referee: Juan Luca Sacchi

15 March 2024 29	Empoli	0–1	Bologna	Empoli
20:45 CET (UTC+1)	Luperto (yellow card) 28'; Pezzella (yellow card) 30'; Maleh (yellow card) 90+6'	Report	Fabbian 90+4'; Freuler (yellow card) 90+7'	Stadium: Stadio Carlo Castellani; Attendance: 11,185; Referee: Michael Fabbri

1 April 2024 30	Internazionale	2–0	Empoli	Milan
20:45 CEST (UTC+2)	Dimarco 6'; Sánchez 81'	Report	Cambiaghi (yellow card) 66'; Cacace (yellow card) 89'	Stadium: San Siro; Attendance: 71,551; Referee: Federico Dionisi

6 April 2024 31	Empoli	3–2	Torino	Empoli
20:45 CEST (UTC+2)	Cambiaghi 6'; Walukiewicz (yellow card) 11'; Cerri (yellow card) 27'; Cancellieri 74'; Niang 90+4'	Report	Zapata (yellow card) 39', (goal) 60', 90+1'	Stadium: Stadio Carlo Castellani; Attendance: 8,374; Referee: Davide Massa

13 April 2024 32	Lecce	1–0	Empoli	Lecce
15:00 CEST (UTC+2)	Almqvist (yellow card) 45+3'; Sansone 89'	Report		Stadium: Stadio Via del mare Attendance: 25,957; Referee: Maurizio Mariani

20 April 2024 33	Empoli	1–0	Napoli	Empoli
18:00 CEST (UTC+2)	Cerri 4'; Pezzella (yellow card) 54'; Bereszyński (yellow card) 58'	Report	Juan Jesus (yellow card) 37'; Ngonge (yellow card) 90+3'	Stadium: Stadio Carlo Castellani; Attendance: 12,916; Referee: Gianluca Manganiello

28 April 2024 34	Atalanta	2–0	Empoli	Bergamo
18:00 CEST (UTC+2)	Pašalić 42' (pen.); Lookman 51'; Scalvini (yellow card) 82'	Report	Luperto (yellow card) 24'; Kovalenko (yellow card) 77'	Stadium: Gewiss Stadium; Attendance: 14,614; Referee: Michael Fabbri

5 May 2024 35	Empoli	0–0	Frosinone	Empoli
15:00 CEST (UTC+2)	Maleh (yellow card) 68'; Żurkowski (yellow card) 75'	Report	Okoli (yellow card) 18'; Valeri (yellow card) 60'; Barrenechea (yellow card) 75'	Stadium: Stadio Carlo Castellani; Attendance: 13,110; Referee: Daniele Doveri

12 May 2024 36	Lazio	2–0	Empoli	Rome
12:30 CEST (UTC+2)	Patric 45+3'; Lazzari (yellow card) 77'; Rovella (yellow card) 85'; Vecino 89'; Romagnoli (yellow card) 90+5'	Report	Gyasi (yellow card) 73'	Stadium: Stadio Olimpico; Attendance: 54,000; Referee: Gianluca Aureliano

19 May 2024 37	Udinese	1–1	Empoli	Udine
15:00 CEST (UTC+2)	Pérez (yellow card) 35'; Samardžić 90+14' (pen.)	Report	Grassi (yellow card) 4' (yellow-red card) 90+15'; Bastoni (yellow card) 54'; Ismajli (yellow card) 64'; Gyasi (yellow card) 75'; Niang 90' (pen.); Marin (yellow card) 90+6'; Fazzini (yellow card) 90+12'	Stadium: Stadio Friuli; Attendance: 24,686; Referee: Marco Guida
Note: Grassi received a second yellow card having already been substituted out of the match.

26 May 2024 38	Empoli	2–1	Roma	Empoli
20:45 CEST (UTC+2)	Gyasi (yellow card) 2'; Cancellieri 13'; Destro (yellow card) 34'; Marin (yellow card) 81'; Niang (yellow card) 90', (goal) 90+3'	Report	Aouar 45+1'; Costa (yellow card) 90'	Stadium: Stadio Carlo Castellani; Attendance: 15,896; Referee: Davide Massa

=== Coppa Italia ===
12 August 2023 Round of 64	Empoli	1–2	Cittadella	Empoli
17:45 CEST (UTC+2)	Caputo 8'; Grassi (yellow card) 57'; Pezzella (yellow card) 69'; Gyasi (yellow card) 77'	Report	Carriero (yellow card) 34'; Giraudo (yellow card) 45'; Amatucci 61'; Magrassi 80'; Cassano (penalty missed) 90+1'; Kornvig (yellow card) 90+9'	Stadium: Stadio Carlo Castellani; Attendance: 1,785; Referee: Alessandro Prontera
