= 2022–23 Empoli FC season =

Empoli FC
2022–23 season
- Chairman: Fabrizio Corsi
- Head coach: Paolo Zanetti
- Stadium: Stadio Carlo Castellani
- Serie A: 14th
- Coppa Italia: Round of 64
- Top goalscorer: League: Nicolò Cambiaghi (6); All: Nicolò Cambiaghi (7)
Home colours	Away colours	Third colours

The 2022–23 season was the 103rd season in the history of Empoli FC and their second consecutive season in the top flight. The club participated in Serie A and the Coppa Italia.

== Players ==
As of 31 January 2023

Note: Flags indicate national team as defined under FIFA eligibility rules; some limited exceptions apply. Players may hold more than one non-FIFA nationality.

No.	Pos.	Nation	Player
1	GK	ITA	Samuele Perisan
3	DF	NZL	Liberato Cacace
4	DF	POL	Sebastian Walukiewicz (on loan from Cagliari)
5	MF	ITA	Alberto Grassi (on loan from Parma)
6	DF	BEL	Koni De Winter (on loan from Juventus)
8	MF	SCO	Liam Henderson
9	FW	URU	Martín Satriano (on loan from Internazionale)
11	MF	CIV	Jean-Daniel Akpa Akpro (on loan from Lazio)
13	GK	ITA	Guglielmo Vicario
14	FW	CRO	Marko Pjaca (on loan from Juventus)
18	MF	ROU	Răzvan Marin (on loan from Cagliari)
19	FW	ITA	Francesco Caputo (on loan from Sampdoria)
21	MF	ITA	Jacopo Fazzini

No.	Pos.	Nation	Player
22	GK	KOS	Samir Ujkani
23	FW	ITA	Mattia Destro
24	DF	NGR	Tyronne Ebuehi
25	MF	ITA	Filippo Bandinelli (captain)
26	DF	ITA	Lorenzo Tonelli
28	FW	ITA	Nicolò Cambiaghi (on loan from Atalanta)
30	DF	SLO	Petar Stojanović
32	MF	SUI	Nicolas Haas
33	DF	ITA	Sebastiano Luperto (on loan from Napoli)
34	DF	ALB	Ardian Ismajli
35	MF	ITA	Tommaso Baldanzi
55	FW	ITA	Emanuel Vignato (on loan from Bologna)
65	DF	ITA	Fabiano Parisi
91	FW	ITA	Roberto Piccoli (on loan from Atalanta)

=== Out on loan ===
As of 31 January 2023

Note: Flags indicate national team as defined under FIFA eligibility rules; some limited exceptions apply. Players may hold more than one non-FIFA nationality.

No.	Pos.	Nation	Player
—	GK	ITA	Niccolò Chiorra (at Mantova until 30 June 2023)
—	GK	ITA	Gabriel Meli (at Recanatese until 30 June 2023)
—	DF	ITA	Francesco Donati (at Ascoli until 30 June 2023)
—	DF	ITA	Leonardo Pezzola (at San Donato Tavarnelle until 30 June 2023)
—	MF	ALB	Kristjan Asllani (at Internazionale until 30 June 2023)
—	MF	ALB	Nedim Bajrami (at Sassuolo until 30 June 2023)
—	MF	ITA	Luca Belardinelli (at Südtirol until 30 June 2023)

No.	Pos.	Nation	Player
—	MF	ITA	Giovanni Crociata (at Cittadella until 30 June 2023)
—	MF	ITA	Tommaso Fantacci (at Arzignano until 30 June 2023)
—	MF	SLO	Leo Štulac (at Palermo until 30 June 2023)
—	FW	SWE	Emmanuel Ekong (at Perugia until 30 June 2023)
—	FW	ITA	Andrea La Mantia (at SPAL until 30 June 2023)
—	FW	ITA	Davide Merola (at Pescara until 30 June 2023)
—	FW	ITA	Alessio Rosa (at Juve Stabia until 30 June 2023)

== Pre-season and friendlies ==
Win Draw Loss Fixtures

The team's pre-season camp began on 5–6 July in Monteboro.

14 July 2022 Friendly	Empoli (Italy)	11–0	(Italy) Calcio Castelfiorentino	Vinci
18:00 CEST (UTC+2)		Report		Stadium: Stadio Comunale di Petroio; Referee: Andrea Zoppi

19 July 2022 Friendly	Empoli (Italy)	3–0	(Italy) Seravezza	Vinci
18:00 CEST (UTC+2)	Luperto 60'; Baldanzi 68'; Marin 88'	Report		Stadium: Stadio Comunale di Petroio; Referee: Edoardo Manedo Mazzoni

25 July 2022 Friendly	Trabzonspor (Turkey)	0–1	(Italy) Empoli	Kitzbühel, Austria
18:00 CEST (UTC+2)		Report	Destro 14'	Stadium: Sportplatz Langau; Referee: Stefan Gamper (Austria)

28 July 2022 Friendly	Empoli (Italy)	2–1	(Cyprus) Pafos	Wörgl, Austria
13:30 CEST (UTC+2)	Haas 5'; Luperto (yellow card) 19'; Destro 33'	Report	Al Ghaddioui 11', (yellow card) 19'	Stadium: Sportstadion Wörgl; Referee: Cemil Et (Austria)

5 December 2022 Friendly	Sturm Graz (Austria)	1–2	(Italy) Empoli	Spain
16:00 CET (UTC+1)

9 December 2022 Friendly	Wolverhampton Wanderers (England)	1–1	(Italy) Empoli	Spain
13:30 CET (UTC+1)

16 December 2022 Friendly	Empoli (Italy)	0–1	(France) Monaco	Empoli
17:00 CET (UTC+1)				Stadium: Stadio Carlo Castellani

23 December 2022 Friendly	Empoli (Italy)	2–1	(Italy) Sassuolo	Empoli
16:00 CET (UTC+1)				Stadium: Stadio Carlo Castellani

== Competitions ==
=== Overall record ===
Competition	First match	Last match	Starting round	Final position	Record							
Competition	First match	Last match	Starting round	Final position	Pld	W	D	L	GF	GA	GD	Win %
Serie A	14 August 2022	3 June 2023	Matchday 1	14th	38	10	13	15	37	49	−12	26.32
Coppa Italia	6 August 2022		Round of 64	Round of 64	1	0	0	1	1	2	−1	0.00
Total					39	10	13	16	38	51	−13	25.64

Source: Soccerway

=== Serie A ===
==== League table ====
Pos	Team	Pld	W	D	L	GF	GA	GD	Pts
12	Udinese	38	11	13	14	47	48	−1	46
13	Sassuolo	38	12	9	17	47	61	−14	45
14	Empoli	38	10	13	15	37	49	−12	43
15	Salernitana	38	9	15	14	48	62	−14	42
16	Lecce	38	8	12	18	33	46	−13	36

Source: Serie A
Rules for classification: 1) Points; 2) Tiebreaker for Champions team and third relegated team; 3) Head-to-head points; 4) Head-to-head goal difference; 5) Goal difference; 6) Goals scored; 7) Draw. (Note: Head-to-head record is used only after all the matches between the teams in question have been played)

==== Results summary ====
Overall								Home						Away					
Pld	W	D	L	GF	GA	GD	Pts	W	D	L	GF	GA	GD	W	D	L	GF	GA	GD
38	10	13	15	37	49	−12	43	8	4	7	22	23	−1	2	9	8	15	26	−11

Source: Serie A

==== Results by round ====
Round	1	2	3	4	5	6	7	8	9	10	11	12	13	14	15	16	17	18	19	20	21	22	23	24	25	26	27	28	29	30	31	32	33	34	35	36	37	38
Ground	A	H	A	H	A	H	A	H	A	H	A	H	H	A	H	A	A	H	A	H	A	H	A	H	A	H	A	H	A	A	H	A	H	H	A	H	A	H
Result	L	D	D	D	D	L	W	L	D	W	L	L	W	L	W	D	D	W	W	D	L	D	D	L	L	L	L	W	D	L	L	L	W	W	D	W	D	L
Position	15	13	14	14	15	16	14	15	14	10	12	14	14	14	13	13	13	12	9	10	12	12	12	13	14	14	14	14	14	14	15	15	15	14	14	14	14	14

Source: Serie A
A = Away; H = Home; W = Win; D = Draw; L = Loss

==== Matches ====
The league fixtures were announced on 24 June 2022.

14 August 2022 1	Spezia	1–0	Empoli	La Spezia
20:45 CEST (UTC+2)	Gyasi (yellow card) 4'; Nzola 36'; Reca (yellow card) 60'	Report	Henderson (yellow card) 14'	Stadium: Stadio Alberto Picco; Attendance: 8,360; Referee: Daniele Chiffi

21 August 2022 2	Empoli	0–0	Fiorentina	Empoli
18:30 CEST (UTC+2)	Bandinelli (yellow card) 31'; Luperto (red card) 66'	Report	Ikoné (yellow card) 37'; Maleh (yellow card) 39'; Sottil (yellow card) 73'	Stadium: Stadio Carlo Castellani; Attendance: 10,500; Referee: Matteo Marchetti

28 August 2022 3	Lecce	1–1	Empoli	Lecce
20:45 CEST (UTC+2)	Banda (yellow card) 34'; Strefezza 40'	Report	Parisi 23'; Marin (yellow card) 27'; Stojanović (yellow card) 57'	Stadium: Stadio Via del mare Attendance: 23,941; Referee: Alberto Santoro

31 August 2022 4	Empoli	1–1	Hellas Verona	Empoli
18:30 CEST (UTC+2)	Baldanzi 26'	Report	Faraoni (yellow card) 9'; Ceccherini (yellow card) 34'; Dawidowicz (yellow card) 66'; Veloso (yellow card) 67'; Kallon 69'	Stadium: Stadio Carlo Castellani; Attendance: 7,269; Referee: Marco Serra

5 September 2022 5	Salernitana	2–2	Empoli	Salerno
18:30 CEST (UTC+2)	Mazzocchi 39', (yellow card) 40'; Coulibaly (yellow card) 42'; Dia 61'; Kastanos (yellow card) 90+1'	Report	Satriano 31', (yellow card) 52'; Lammers 81'; Akpa Akpro (yellow card) 87'	Stadium: Stadio Arechi; Attendance: 18,173; Referee: Rosario Abisso

12 September 2022 6	Empoli	1–2	Roma	Empoli
20:45 CEST (UTC+2)	Parisi (yellow card) 27'; Bandinelli 43'; Ismajli (yellow card) 60'; Akpa Akpro (yellow card) 65', (red card) 87'	Report	Dybala 17'; Abraham 71'; Pellegrini (penalty missed) 80'; Çelik (yellow card) 89'	Stadium: Stadio Carlo Castellani; Attendance: 13,420; Referee: Livio Marinelli

17 September 2022 7	Bologna	0–1	Empoli	Bologna
15:00 CEST (UTC+2)	Kasius (yellow card) 90+3'; Domínguez (yellow card) 90+5'	Report	Bandinelli 75'; Grassi (yellow card) 89'; Henderson (yellow card) 90+2'; Fazzini (yellow card) 90+6'	Stadium: Stadio Renato Dall'Ara; Attendance: 15,670; Referee: Manuel Volpi

1 October 2022 8	Empoli	1–3	Milan	Empoli
20:45 CEST (UTC+2)	Haas (yellow card) 26'; De Winter (yellow card) 56'; Luperto (yellow card) 61'; Bajrami 90+2'	Report	Kjær (yellow card) 24'; Rebić 79'; Bennacer (yellow card) 90+1'; Ballo-Touré 90+3'; Leão 90+6'	Stadium: Stadio Carlo Castellani; Attendance: 15,497; Referee: Gianluca Aureliano

9 October 2022 9	Torino	1–1	Empoli	Turin
12:30 CEST (UTC+2)	Sanabria (yellow card) 14'; Pellegri (yellow card) 80'; Lukić 90'	Report	Bandinelli (yellow card) 25'; Destro 49'; Parisi (yellow card) 56'; Marin (yellow card) 80'; Vicario (yellow card) 90+5'	Stadium: Stadio Olimpico Grande Torino; Attendance: 16,793; Referee: Francesco Fourneau

15 October 2022 10	Empoli	1–0	Monza	Empoli
15:00 CEST (UTC+2)	Haas 11'; Stojanović (yellow card) 17'; Destro (yellow card) 18'; Henderson (yellow card) 27'; De Winter (yellow card) 60'; Marin (yellow card) 90+4'	Report	Sensi (yellow card) 24'; Marí (yellow card) 55'; Caldirola (yellow card) 80'; Rovella (red card) 90+5'	Stadium: Stadio Carlo Castellani; Attendance: 7,258; Referee: Antonio Rapuano

21 October 2022 11	Juventus	4–0	Empoli	Turin
20:45 CEST (UTC+2)	Kean 8'; Cuadrado (yellow card) 36'; McKennie 56'; Rabiot (yellow card) 58', (goal) 82', 90+4'	Report	Satriano (yellow card) 58'; Haas (yellow card) 69'	Stadium: Juventus Stadium; Attendance: 37,771; Referee: Michael Fabbri

30 October 2022 12	Empoli	0–2	Atalanta	Empoli
12:30 CET (UTC+1)	De Winter (yellow card) 38'; Destro (yellow card) 39'	Report	Hateboer 32', (yellow card) 83'; Koopmeiners (penalty missed) 42'; Lookman 59'	Stadium: Stadio Carlo Castellani; Attendance: 8,740; Referee: Giovanni Ayroldi

5 November 2022 13	Empoli	1–0	Sassuolo	Empoli
15:00 CET (UTC+1)	Marin (yellow card) 27'; Fazzini (yellow card) 54'; Baldanzi 64'	Report		Stadium: Stadio Carlo Castellani; Attendance: 7,834; Referee: Ermanno Feliciani

8 November 2022 14	Napoli	2–0	Empoli	Naples
18:30 CET (UTC+1)	Østigård (yellow card) 57'; Lozano 69' (pen.); Zieliński 88'	Report	Bandinelli (yellow card) 15'; Satriano (yellow card) 22'; Luperto (yellow card) 39' (yellow-red card) 74'; Parisi (yellow card) 61'; Henderson (yellow card) 90'	Stadium: Stadio Diego Armando Maradona; Attendance: 40,000; Referee: Luca Pairetto

11 November 2022 15	Empoli	2–0	Cremonese	Empoli
20:45 CET (UTC+1)	Cambiaghi 46', (yellow card) 69'; Parisi 88'	Report	Meïté (yellow card) 43'; Pickel (yellow card) 90'	Stadium: Stadio Carlo Castellani; Attendance: 8,077; Referee: Federico Dionisi

4 January 2023 16	Udinese	1–1	Empoli	Udine
20:45 CET (UTC+1)	Walace (yellow card) 45+2'; Pereyra 70'; Nestorovski (yellow card) 90+4'	Report	Baldanzi 3'; Akpa Akpro (yellow card) 18' (yellow-red card) 79'; Caputo (yellow card) 61'	Stadium: Stadio Friuli; Attendance: 19,327; Referee: Marco Serra

8 January 2023 17	Lazio	2–2	Empoli	Rome
15:00 CET (UTC+1)	Felipe Anderson 2'; Lazzari (yellow card) 43'; Zaccagni 54'; Romagnoli (yellow card) 68'; Pedro (yellow card) 70'; Vecino (yellow card) 90+2'	Report	Bandinelli (yellow card) 72'; Caputo 83'; Marin 90+3'	Stadium: Stadio Olimpico; Attendance: 35,000; Referee: Ivano Pezzuto

16 January 2023 18	Empoli	1–0	Sampdoria	Empoli
20:45 CET (UTC+1)	Parisi (yellow card) 41'; Ebuehi 55'; Marin (yellow card) 71'; Ismajli (yellow card) 86'; Stojanović (yellow card) 90'; Vicario (yellow card) 90+9'	Report	Léris (yellow card) 6'; Vieira (yellow card) 29'; Gabbiadini (yellow card) 31'; Sabiri (yellow card) 90+5'; Đuričić (yellow card) 90+12'; Audero (yellow card) 90+12'	Stadium: Stadio Carlo Castellani; Attendance: 10,364; Referee: Alberto Santoro

23 January 2023 19	Internazionale	0–1	Empoli	Milan
20:45 CET (UTC+1)	Škriniar (yellow card) 25' (yellow-red card) 40'; Barella (yellow card) 68'; Džeko (yellow card) 89'	Report	Henderson (yellow card) 30'; Akpa Akpro (yellow card) 31'; Parisi (yellow card) 45+1'; Baldanzi 66'	Stadium: San Siro; Attendance: 65,476; Referee: Antonio Rapuano

28 January 2023 20	Empoli	2–2	Torino	Empoli
15:00 CET (UTC+1)	Luperto 37'; Akpa Akpro (yellow card) 63'; Marin 69'; Bajrami (yellow card) 78'	Report	Ricci 82'; Sanabria 85'	Stadium: Stadio Carlo Castellani; Attendance: 8,029; Referee: Matteo Marcenaro

4 February 2023 21	Roma	2–0	Empoli	Rome
18:00 CET (UTC+1)	Ibañez 2'; Abraham 6'; Zalewski (yellow card) 10'; Bove (yellow card) 77'	Report	Henderson (yellow card) 81'	Stadium: Stadio Olimpico; Attendance: 60,908; Referee: Federico Dionisi

11 February 2023 22	Empoli	2–2	Spezia	Empoli
15:00 CET (UTC+1)	Parisi (red card) 21'; Vicario (yellow card) 25'; Cambiaghi 71'; Vignato 90+4'	Report	Nikolaou (yellow card) 25'; Verde 25' (pen.), 31', (yellow card) 33'; Esposito (yellow card) 39' (yellow-red card) 49'; Ekdal (yellow card) 63'	Stadium: Stadio Carlo Castellani; Attendance: 7,871; Referee: Antonio Giua

19 February 2023 23	Fiorentina	1–1	Empoli	Florence
15:00 CET (UTC+1)	Martínez Quarta (yellow card) 70'; Cabral 85'	Report	Akpa Akpro (yellow card) 27'; Cambiaghi 28'; Ismajli (yellow card) 45+4'; Cacace (yellow card) 60'; Baldanzi (yellow card) 64'; Bandinelli (yellow card) 73'	Stadium: Stadio Artemio Franchi; Attendance: 29,663; Referee: Alessandro Prontera

25 February 2023 24	Empoli	0–2	Napoli	Empoli
18:00 CET (UTC+1)	Henderson (yellow card) 25'; Grassi (yellow card) 62'	Report	Ismajli 17' (o.g.); Osimhen 28'; Lozano (yellow card) 63'; Mário Rui (red card) 67'	Stadium: Stadio Carlo Castellani; Attendance: 12,624; Referee: Giovanni Ayroldi

4 March 2023 25	Monza	2–1	Empoli	Monza
15:00 CET (UTC+1)	Ciurria 19'; Birindelli (yellow card) 45+2'; Pessina (yellow card) 49'; Izzo 67'	Report	Parisi (yellow card) 34'; Akpa Akpro (yellow card) 45+1'; Satriano 51'; Marin (yellow card) 53'	Stadium: Stadio Brianteo; Attendance: 10,601; Referee: Ermanno Feliciani

11 March 2023 26	Empoli	0–1	Udinese	Empoli
15:00 CET (UTC+1)	Luperto (yellow card) 28'; Fazzini (yellow card) 74'	Report	Bijol (yellow card) 19'; Becão (yellow card) 45+3', (goal) 54'; Beto (yellow card) 67'; Lovrić (yellow card) 73'	Stadium: Stadio Carlo Castellani; Attendance: 7,465; Referee: Francesco Cosso

17 March 2023 28	Atalanta	2–1	Empoli	Bergamo
20:45 CET (UTC+1)	De Roon 58'; Lookman (yellow card) 85'; Højlund 86'; Palomino (yellow card) 88'; Ruggeri (yellow card) 90+1'	Report	Ebuehi 44'; Henderson (yellow card) 82'; Bandinelli (yellow card) 84'	Stadium: Gewiss Stadium; Attendance: 17,864; Referee: Federico Dionisi

3 April 2023 28	Empoli	1–0	Lecce	Empoli
18:30 CEST (UTC+2)	Bandinelli (yellow card) 19'; Caputo 62' (pen.); Fazzini (yellow card) 71'; Marin (yellow card) 90+6'	Report	Blin (yellow card) 22'; Tuia (yellow card) 68'; Umtiti (yellow card) 89'	Stadium: Stadio Carlo Castellani; Attendance: 8,844; Referee: Michael Fabbri

7 April 2023 29	Milan	0–0	Empoli	Milan
21:00 CEST (UTC+2)	Pobega (yellow card) 38'; Tomori (yellow card) 90+9'	Report	Cambiaghi (yellow card) 90+3'; Satriano (yellow card) 90+4'	Stadium: San Siro; Attendance: 70,286; Referee: Matteo Marcenaro

14 April 2023 30	Cremonese	1–0	Empoli	Cremona
18:30 CEST (UTC+2)	Dessers 4'; Sernicola (yellow card) 15'	Report		Stadium: Stadio Giovanni Zini; Attendance: 8,966; Referee: Luca Zufferli

23 April 2023 31	Empoli	0–3	Internazionale	Empoli
12:30 CEST (UTC+2)	Parisi (yellow card) 32'	Report	Lukaku 48', 76'; Barella (yellow card) 81'; Martínez 88'	Stadium: Stadio Carlo Castellani; Attendance: 15,337; Referee: Livio Marinelli

30 April 2023 32	Sassuolo	2–1	Empoli	Reggio Emilia
15:00 CEST (UTC+2)	Laurienté (yellow card) 26'; Lopez (yellow card) 62'; Pinamonti (red card) 74'; Berardi 82', 90+7' (pen.)	Report	Cambiaghi 11'; Bandinelli (yellow card) 63'	Stadium: Mapei Stadium – Città del Tricolore; Attendance: 10,267; Referee: Federico Dionisi

4 May 2023 33	Empoli	3–1	Bologna	Empoli
20:45 CEST (UTC+2)	Lucumí 1' (o.g.); Parisi (yellow card) 28'; Akpa Akpro 45+1'; Henderson (yellow card) 66'; Cambiaghi 68'; Bandinelli (yellow card) 87'	Report	Orsolini 88' (pen.)	Stadium: Stadio Carlo Castellani; Attendance: 8,439; Referee: Federico La Penna

8 May 2023 34	Empoli	2–1	Salernitana	Empoli
18:30 CEST (UTC+2)	Cambiaghi 38'; Caputo 63'; Baldanzi (yellow card) 70'; Destro (yellow card) 90+6'	Report	Lovato (yellow card) 28'; Bronn (yellow card) 60'; Piątek 85'	Stadium: Stadio Carlo Castellani; Attendance: 10,760; Referee: Manuel Volpi

15 May 2023 35	Sampdoria	1–1	Empoli	Genoa
20:45 CEST (UTC+2)	Amione (yellow card) 28'; Zanoli 34'; Đuričić (yellow card) 59'; Gabbiadini (yellow card) 77'	Report	Grassi (yellow card) 43'; Pjaca (yellow card) 72'; Cambiaghi (yellow card) 72'; Parisi (yellow card) 85'; Piccoli 90+3'	Stadium: Stadio Luigi Ferraris; Attendance: 16,867; Referee: Ermanno Feliciani

22 May 2023 36	Empoli	4–1	Juventus	Empoli
20:45 CEST (UTC+2)	Caputo 18' (pen.), 48'; Luperto 21'; Parisi (yellow card) 55'; Bandinelli (yellow card) 66'; Piccoli 90+3'	Report	Rabiot (yellow card) 56'; Paredes (yellow card) 76'; Chiesa 85'	Stadium: Stadio Carlo Castellani; Attendance: 15,519; Referee: Giovanni Ayroldi

28 May 2023 37	Hellas Verona	1–1	Empoli	Verona
12:30 CEST (UTC+2)	Cabal (yellow card) 10'; Veloso (yellow card) 56'; Gaich 61', (yellow card) 63'; Ceccherini (yellow card) 87'	Report	Magnani 90+6' (o.g.)	Stadium: Stadio Marcantonio Bentegodi; Attendance: 22,831; Referee: Daniele Chiffi

3 June 2023 38	Empoli	0–2	Lazio	Empoli
21:00 CEST (UTC+2)	Akpa Akpro (yellow card) 14'; Cambiaghi (yellow card) 37' (yellow-red card) 89'	Report	Milinković-Savić (yellow card) 40'; Romagnoli 48'; Vecino (yellow card) 62'; Luis Alberto 90+2'	Stadium: Stadio Carlo Castellani; Attendance: 11,545; Referee: Luca Massimi

=== Coppa Italia ===
6 August 2022 Round of 64	Empoli	1–2 (a.e.t.)	SPAL	Empoli
21:00 CEST (UTC+2)	Stojanović (yellow card) 19'; Bandinelli (yellow card) 37'; Cambiaghi 80'; Štulac (yellow card) 110'	Report	Zanellato (yellow card) 34'; Dickmann 82'; Finotto (yellow card) 86'; Mancosu (yellow card) 92'; Viviani (yellow card) 95'; Dalle Mura (yellow card) 100'; Arena 120+1'	Stadium: Stadio Carlo Castellani; Attendance: 1,155; Referee: Manuel Volpi

== Statistics ==
=== Appearances and goals ===
No.	Pos	Nat	Player	Total		Serie A		Coppa Italia	
No.	Pos	Nat	Player	Apps	Goals	Apps	Goals	Apps	Goals
Goalkeepers
1	GK	(Italy) ITA	Samuele Perisan	7	0	7	0	0	0
13	GK	(Italy) ITA	Guglielmo Vicario	32	0	31	0	1	0
22	GK	(Kosovo) KOS	Samir Ujkani	1	0	0+1	0	0	0
Defenders
3	DF	(New Zealand) NZL	Liberato Cacace	17	0	12+5	0	0	0
4	DF	(Poland) POL	Sebastian Walukiewicz	11	0	6+5	0	0	0
6	DF	(Belgium) BEL	Koni De Winter	0	0	0	0	0	0
24	DF	(Nigeria) NGR	Tyronne Ebuehi	26	2	22+4	2	0	0
26	DF	(Italy) ITA	Lorenzo Tonelli	1	0	0+1	0	0	0
30	DF	(Slovenia) SLO	Petar Stojanović	28	0	16+11	0	1	0
33	DF	(Italy) ITA	Sebastiano Luperto	37	2	36	2	1	0
34	DF	(Albania) ALB	Ardian Ismajli	26	0	22+3	0	1	0
65	DF	(Italy) ITA	Fabiano Parisi	34	2	33	2	0+1	0
Midfielders
5	MF	(Italy) ITA	Alberto Grassi	26	0	14+11	0	0+1	0
8	MF	(Scotland) SCO	Liam Henderson	26	0	11+14	0	1	0
11	MF	(Ivory Coast) CIV	Jean-Daniel Akpa Akpro	24	1	16+8	1	0	0
18	MF	(Romania) ROU	Răzvan Marin	34	2	28+5	2	1	0
20	MF	(Italy) ITA	Duccio Degli Innocenti	2	0	0+1	0	0+1	0
21	MF	(Italy) ITA	Jacopo Fazzini	22	0	8+13	0	0+1	0
25	MF	(Italy) ITA	Filippo Bandinelli	36	2	28+7	2	1	0
32	MF	(Switzerland) SUI	Nicolas Haas	25	1	12+12	1	1	0
35	MF	(Italy) ITA	Tommaso Baldanzi	27	4	24+2	4	0+1	0
Forwards
9	FW	(Uruguay) URU	Martín Satriano	32	2	20+11	2	0+1	0
14	FW	(Croatia) CRO	Marko Pjaca	17	0	5+12	0	0	0
19	FW	(Italy) ITA	Francesco Caputo	21	5	20+1	5	0	0
23	FW	(Italy) ITA	Mattia Destro	18	1	6+11	1	1	0
28	FW	(Italy) ITA	Nicolò Cambiaghi	29	7	12+16	6	0+1	1
55	FW	(Italy) ITA	Emanuel Vignato	5	1	0+5	1	0	0
87	FW	(Portugal) POR	Herculano Nabian	1	0	0+1	0	0	0
91	FW	(Italy) ITA	Roberto Piccoli	13	2	6+7	2	0	0
Players transferred out during the season
10	MF	(Albania) ALB	Nedim Bajrami	28	1	19+8	1	1	0
7	FW	(Netherlands) NED	Sam Lammers	14	1	10+4	1	0	0
17	FW	(Sweden) SWE	Emmanuel Ekong	2	0	0+2	0	0	0

Last updated: 3 June 2023
Source: Competitions
