= Tommaso Baldanzi =

Italian footballer (born 2003)

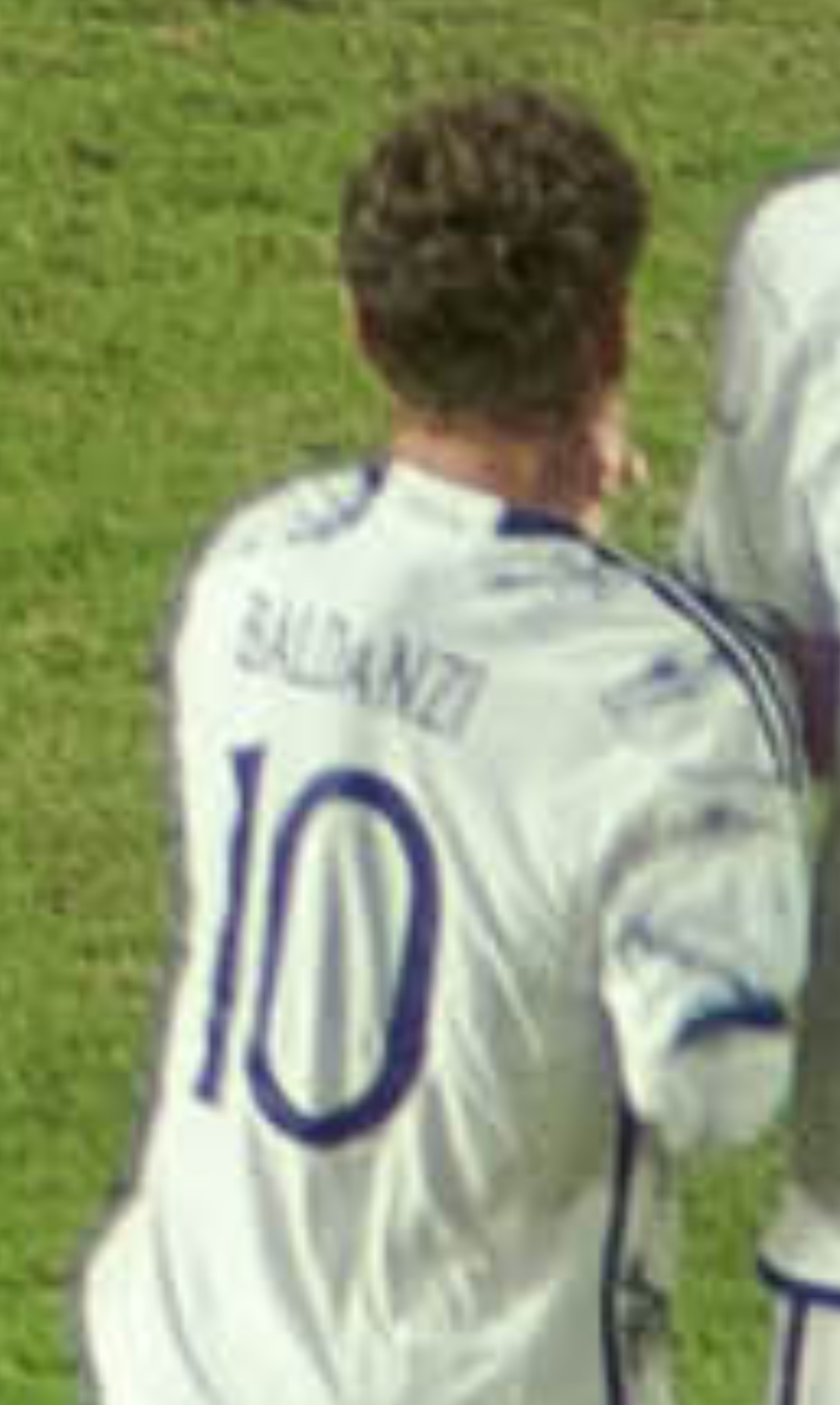
- Baldanzi with Italy U20 in 2023

Personal information
- Date of birth: 23 March 2003 (age 23)
- Place of birth: Poggibonsi, Italy
- Height: 1.70 m (5 ft 7 in)
- Position: Attacking midfielder

Team information
- Current team: Genoa (on loan from Roma)
- Number: 8

Youth career
- 2011–2022: Empoli

Senior career*
Years	Team	Apps	(Gls)
2020–2024	Empoli	41	(6)
2024–	Roma	54	(2)
2026–	→ Genoa (loan)	14	(1)

International career^{‡}
2019–2020	Italy U17	3	(1)
2021	Italy U18	1	(2)
2021–2022	Italy U19	12	(2)
2023	Italy U20	7	(2)
2023–2025	Italy U21	10	(5)
Medal record
Men's football
Representing Italy
FIFA U-20 World Cup
Runner-up	2023 Argentina
- * Club domestic league appearances and goals as of 20:06, 29 October 2026 (UTC) ‡ National team caps and goals as of 14 June 2025

Tommaso Baldanzi (born 23 March 2003) is an Italian professional footballer who plays as an attacking midfielder for Serie A club Genoa, on loan from Roma.

== Club career ==
Born in Poggibonsi and raised in Castelfiorentino, Baldanzi first started playing football at the local grassroots club, aged six; two years later, he joined the youth academy of Empoli, where he came through the youth ranks and won an under-16 national championship in 2019.

On 28 October 2020, the midfielder made his professional debut for Empoli, coming on as a substitute in a 4–2 Coppa Italia win against Benevento; during the victory, he assisted Leonardo Mancuso's closing goal. In the same season, he helped Empoli's under-19 team win the Campionato Primavera, being also nominated as the league's MVP in the process.

In the following season, after featuring in the UEFA Youth League, Baldanzi was officially promoted to the first team, together with teammates Jacopo Fazzini and Duccio Degli Innocenti. He then made his Serie A debut on 22 May 2022, replacing Patrick Cutrone in the 74th minute of a 1–0 away win against Atalanta.

On 28 August of the same year, Baldanzi started his first league match against Lecce, which ended in a 1–1 draw. Three days after, on 31 August, he scored his first professional goal in a 1–1 league draw against Hellas Verona. On 23 January 2023, Baldanzi scored the only goal of a 1–0 league victory against Inter Milan.

On 1 February 2024, Baldanzi signed with Roma.

On 23 January 2026, Baldanzi moved to Genoa on loan with an option to buy.

== International career ==
Baldanzi has represented Italy at various youth international levels.

In June 2022, he was included in the squad that took part in the 2022 UEFA European Under-19 Championship in Slovakia, where the Azzurrini reached the semi-finals before losing to eventual winners England.

Both in May and December 2022, Baldanzi was involved in training camps led by the Italian senior national team's manager, Roberto Mancini, and aimed to the most promising national talents. On 24 March 2023 he made his debut for the Italy U21 squad in a friendly match won 2–0 against Serbia.

In May 2023, he was included in the Italian squad that took part in the FIFA U-20 World Cup in Argentina, where the Azzurrini finished runners-up after losing to Uruguay in the final match.

== Style of play ==
Baldanzi is an attacking midfielder, who mainly operates as a number 10, but can also play as a left winger in an attacking trio. Due to his low center of gravity, he has shown notable quickness, ball control, technique and creativity. Primarily a left-footer, he can also use his weaker right foot as well, and represents a frequent attacking threat, thanks to his vision, his dribbling skills and his shooting (both from short and long range).

Rated as one of the best Italian prospects of his generation, Baldanzi has been compared to Sebastian Giovinco and Papu Gómez, although he cited Paulo Dybala as his biggest source of inspiration.

== Career statistics ==
=== Club ===
As of match played 28 October 2026

Appearances and goals by club, season and competition
Club	Season	League			Coppa Italia		Europe		Total	
Club	Season	Division	Apps	Goals	Apps	Goals	Apps	Goals	Apps	Goals
Empoli	2020–21	Serie B	0	0	2	0	—		2	0
Empoli	2021–22	Serie A	1	0	0	0	—		1	0
Empoli	2022–23	Serie A	26	4	1	0	—		27	4
Empoli	2023–24	Serie A	14	2	0	0	—		14	2
Empoli	Total		41	6	3	0	—		44	6
Roma	2023–24	Serie A	13	0	—		5 (Note: Appearances in UEFA Europa League)	0	18	0
Roma	2024–25	Serie A	31	1	1	1	9	0	41	2
Roma	2025–26	Serie A	10	1	0	0	0	0	10	1
Roma	Total		54	2	1	1	14	0	69	3
Genoa (loan)	2025–26	Serie A	8	0	0	0	—		8	0
Genoa (loan)	2026–27	Serie A	6	1	2	1	—		8	2
Genoa (loan)	Total		14	1	2	1	0	0	16	2
Career total			109	9	6	2	14	0	129	11

== Honours ==
Empoli U16

- Campionato Nazionale Under-16 A e B: 2018–19

Empoli U19

- Campionato Primavera 1: 2020–21

Italy U20

- FIFA U-20 World Cup runner-up: 2023

Individual

- Campionato Primavera 1 Most Valuable Player: 2020–21
