= Herculano Nabian =

Portuguese footballer

Personal information
- Full name: Herculano Bucancil Nabian
- Date of birth: 25 January 2004 (age 22)
- Place of birth: Bissau, Guinea-Bissau
- Height: 1.82 m (6 ft 0 in)
- Position: Forward

Team information
- Current team: Keçiörengücü
- Number: 45

Youth career
- 2013–2015: Recreios Algueirão
- 2015–2018: Belenenses
- 2018–2020: Vitória Guimarães

Senior career*
Years	Team	Apps	(Gls)
2020–2023	Vitória Guimarães B	35	(10)
2021–2023	Vitória Guimarães	5	(0)
2022–2023	→ Empoli (loan)	1	(0)
2023–2026	Empoli	1	(0)
2024–2025	→ União de Leiria (loan)	7	(0)
2025	→ Mérida (loan)	11	(0)
2025–2026	→ Pontedera (loan)	33	(3)
2026–	Keçiörengücü	9	(0)

International career^{‡}
2019	Portugal U15	5	(3)
2019	Portugal U16	6	(5)
2019–2020	Portugal U17	9	(4)
2021–2022	Portugal U18	11	(2)
2021–2023	Portugal U19	13	(1)
2023	Portugal U20	5	(1)
Medal record
Men's football
Representing Portugal
UEFA European Under-19 Championship
Runner-up	2023 Malta
- * Club domestic league appearances and goals as of 30 October 2026 ‡ National team caps and goals as of 22:50, 19 November 2023 (UTC)

Herculano Bucancil Nabian (born 25 January 2004) is a professional footballer who plays as a forward for Turkish TFF 1. Lig club Keçiörengücü. Born in Guinea-Bissau, he is a former youth international for Portugal.

== Club career ==
Born in Bissau, Nabian was formed at C.F. Os Belenenses before joining Vitória de Guimarães in 2018. His tally of 51 goals in two years in their youth team earned attention from foreign teams, and in July 2020, he signed his first professional contract of three years with the option of one more, and a buyout clause of €60 million.

In the 2020–21 season, he took part with the reserve team in the third tier, scoring 7 goals in 21 games. This included a hat-trick on 3 April in a 5–1 win over the second team of Rio Ave FC. On 26 July 2021, he made his first-team debut in the first round of the Taça da Liga in a 4–1 home win over Leixões S.C. as an 85th-minute substitute; he assisted the final goal by Maga. His Primeira Liga bow came on 8 August again as a late replacement at the Estádio D. Afonso Henriques, in a 1–0 loss to Portimonense SC.

On 6 August 2022, Nabian joined Serie A club Empoli on loan. The Italian side paid a €150.000 loan fee and an option-to-buy was set at €450.000 plus €600.000 in future add-ons. In April 2023, Empoli decided to trigger the buy-clause, with Nabian signing a four-year contract.

On 2 September 2024, Nabian joined União de Leiria on loan. On 31 January 2025, Nabian moved on loan to Mérida in the Spanish third tier, with an option to buy.

== Career statistics ==
=== Club ===
As of match played 11 March 2023

Appearances and goals by club, season and competition
Club	Season	League			National cup		League cup		Total	
Club	Season	Division	Apps	Goals	Apps	Goals	Apps	Goals	Apps	Goals
Vitória Guimarães B	2020–21	Campeonato de Portugal	21	7	—		—		21	7
Vitória Guimarães B	2021–22	Liga 3	14	3	—		—		14	3
Vitória Guimarães B	Total		35	10	—		—		35	10
Vitória Guimarães	2021–22	Primeira Liga	5	0	0	0	1	0	6	0
Empoli (loan)	2022–23	Serie A	1	0	0	0	—		1	0
Empoli	2023–24	Serie A	0	0	0	0	—		0	0
Career total			41	10	0	0	1	0	42	10
