= Nicky Henderson (footballer) =

Scottish footballer

Personal information
- Date of birth: 8 February 1969 (age 57)
- Place of birth: Broxburn, Scotland
- Position: Midfielder

Youth career
- Broxburn Athletic

Senior career*
Years	Team	Apps	(Gls)
1991–1992	Raith Rovers	1	(0)
1992–1994	Cowdenbeath	54	(14)
1994–1995	Falkirk	40	(7)
1995–1998	Partick Thistle	65	(7)
1998–2000	Hamilton Academical	49	(6)
2000	Clyde	12	(0)
2000–2001	Stenhousemuir	23	(1)
2001–2002	Stirling Albion	14	(4)
Total		258	(39)
- * Club domestic league appearances and goals

Nicky Henderson (born 8 February 1969) is a Scottish former professional footballer, who played for Raith Rovers, Cowdenbeath, Falkirk, Partick Thistle, Hamilton Academical, Clyde, Stenhousemuir and Stirling Albion. After playing for Stirling in season 2001–02, he retired from playing football due to injury.

His sons Liam and Ewan are also professional footballers.
