= Sebastian Walukiewicz =

Polish footballer (born 2000)

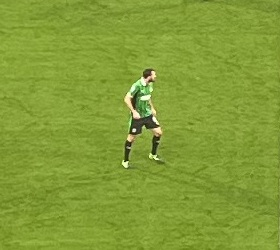
- Walukiewicz with Sassuolo in 2026

Personal information
- Full name: Sebastian Wiktor Walukiewicz
- Date of birth: 5 April 2000 (age 26)
- Place of birth: Gorzów Wielkopolski, Poland
- Height: 1.88 m (6 ft 2 in)
- Position: Defender

Team information
- Current team: Sassuolo
- Number: 6

Youth career
- FC Kłodawa 13
- MKP Gorzów Wielkopolski
- 2013–2017: Legia Warsaw

Senior career*
Years	Team	Apps	(Gls)
2017	Legia Warsaw II	1	(0)
2017–2018	Pogoń Szczecin II	12	(0)
2018–2019	Pogoń Szczecin	21	(0)
2019–2023	Cagliari	40	(0)
2019	→ Pogoń Szczecin (loan)	11	(1)
2022–2023	→ Empoli (loan)	11	(0)
2023–2024	Empoli	29	(0)
2024–2026	Torino	29	(0)
2025–2026	→ Sassuolo (loan)	34	(1)
2026–	Sassuolo	0	(0)

International career^{‡}
2014–2015	Poland U15	8	(2)
2015–2016	Poland U16	8	(1)
2016–2017	Poland U17	8	(0)
2017	Poland U18	2	(1)
2017–2018	Poland U19	6	(2)
2018–2019	Poland U20	8	(0)
2019–2022	Poland U21	11	(1)
2020–	Poland	10	(1)
- * Club domestic league appearances and goals as of 25 May 2026 ‡ National team caps and goals as of 22:10, 6 June 2025 (UTC)

Sebastian Wiktor Walukiewicz (born 5 April 2000) is a Polish professional footballer who plays as a defender for Serie A club Sassuolo and the Poland national team.

== Club career ==
=== Pogoń Szczecin ===
In 2017, Walukiewicz joined Pogoń Szczecin from Legia Warsaw II. He made his Ekstraklasa debut on 7 April 2018 against his former club, Legia Warsaw, playing 8 minutes in a 3–0 away defeat.

=== Cagliari ===
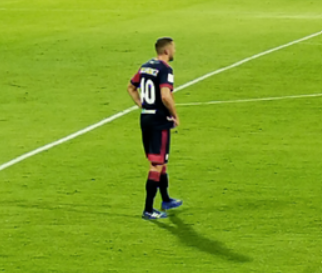
Walukiewicz with Cagliari during the 2021–22 Coppa Italia

On 8 January 2019, Walukewicz joined Cagliari Calcio on a four-and-a-half-year contract. He returned to Pogoń Szczecin on loan until the end of the season.

=== Empoli ===
On 1 September 2022, he moved to Serie A club Empoli on loan until the end of the season with an option and a conditional obligation to buy. Walukiewicz made 11 league appearances in the 2022–23 season before joining the Tuscan side on a permanent basis on 14 June 2023.

=== Torino ===
On the summer transfer deadline day in 2024, Walukiewicz moved to fellow Serie A club Torino on a three-year contract, for a reported fee of €5 million.

=== Sassuolo ===
On 25 July 2025, Walukiewicz joined Sassuolo on loan with an option to buy. On 17 June 2026, Sassuolo activated Walukiewicz's buyout clause to sign him permanently from Torino.

== International career ==
On 7 October 2020, Walukiewicz debuted for the Polish senior squad in the friendly match against Finland. Four days later, he made his competitive debut, playing a full game in the Nations League 0–0 home draw against Italy.

Walukiewicz was named in the 29-man preliminary squad for UEFA Euro 2024 on 29 May 2024. During a friendly match against Ukraine on 7 June 2024 prior to said tournament, he scored his first international goal which Poland won 3–1. Later that day, Walukiewicz was selected in the final squad. He made no appearances as Poland left the tournament after the group stage.

== Career statistics ==
=== Club ===
As of match played 8 May 2026

Appearances and goals by club, season and competition
Club	Season	League			National cup (Note: Includes Coppa Italia)		Europe		Other		Total	
Club	Season	Division	Apps	Goals	Apps	Goals	Apps	Goals	Apps	Goals	Apps	Goals
Legia Warsaw II	2016–17	III liga, gr. I	1	0	—		—		—		1	0
Pogoń Szczecin II	2017–18	III liga, gr. II	12	0	—		—		—		12	0
Pogoń Szczecin	2017–18	Ekstraklasa	3	0	0	0	—		—		3	0
Pogoń Szczecin	2018–19	Ekstraklasa	29	1	0	0	—		—		29	1
Pogoń Szczecin	Total		32	1	0	0	—		—		32	1
Cagliari	2019–20	Serie A	14	0	2	0	—		—		16	0
Cagliari	2020–21	Serie A	19	0	2	0	—		—		21	0
Cagliari	2021–22	Serie A	7	0	1	0	—		—		8	0
Cagliari	Total		40	0	5	0	—		—		45	0
Empoli (loan)	2022–23	Serie A	11	0	0	0	—		—		11	0
Empoli	2023–24	Serie A	27	0	0	0	—		—		27	0
Empoli	2024–25	Serie A	2	0	0	0	—		—		2	0
Empoli	Total		40	0	0	0	—		—		40	0
Torino	2024–25	Serie A	29	0	1	0	—		—		30	0
Sassuolo (loan)	2025–25	Serie A	34	0	2	0	—		—		36	0
Sassuolo	2026–27	Serie A	0	0	0	0	—		—		0	0
Sassuolo	Total		34	0	2	0	—		—		36	0
Career total			188	1	7	0	0	0	0	0	196	1

=== International ===
As of match played 6 June 2025

Appearances and goals by national team and year
National team	Year	Apps	Goals
Poland	2020	3	0
Poland	2024	6	1
Poland	2025	1	0
Total		10	1

Scores and results list Poland goal tally first, score column indicates score after each Walukiewicz goal

List of international goals scored by Sebastian Walukiewicz
No.	Date	Venue	Opponent	Score	Result	Competition
1	7 June 2024	Stadion Narodowy, Warsaw, Poland	Ukraine	1–0	3–1	Friendly

== Honours ==
Individual

- Polish Newcomer of the Year: 2018
