= Emmanuel Ekong =

Swedish footballer (born 2002)

Personal information
- Date of birth: 25 June 2002 (age 24)
- Place of birth: Reggio Emilia, Italy
- Height: 1.83 m (6 ft 0 in)
- Position: Forward

Team information
- Current team: Malmö FF
- Number: 11

Youth career
- –2015: Bollstanäs SK
- 2015–2018: IF Brommapojkarna
- 2018–2021: Empoli

Senior career*
Years	Team	Apps	(Gls)
2021–2025	Empoli	18	(0)
2023	→ Perugia (loan)	9	(0)
2023–2024	→ Istra 1961 (loan)	21	(3)
2025–	Malmö FF	25	(4)

International career^{‡}
2019–2021	Sweden U19	5	(1)
2024	Sweden U21	1	(0)
- * Club domestic league appearances and goals as of 4 July 2026 ‡ National team caps and goals as of 16:40, 16 October 2024 (UTC)

Emmanuel Ekong (born 25 June 2002) is a professional footballer who plays as a forward for Allsvenskan club Malmö FF. Born in Italy, he represented Sweden at youth level.

== Club career ==
As a youth player, Ekong joined the youth academy of Swedish seventh tier side Bollstanäs SK. in 2015, he joined the youth academy of IF Brommapojkarna in the Swedish second tier.

In 2018, he joined the youth academy of Italian club Empoli. On 5 September 2022, Ekong made his debut for Empoli during a 2–2 draw with Salernitana.

In January 2023, Ekong signed for Serie B club Perugia on loan until the end of the season.

On 8 September 2023, Ekong joined Croatian side Istra 1961 on loan until the end of the season, with an option to buy.

On 8 January 2025, Malmö FF announced Ekong's signing.

== International career ==
Born in Italy to Nigerian parents and raised in Sweden, Ekong is eligible to represent Nigeria, Italy and Sweden.

He has represented the Swedish under-19 national team five times, scoring one goal.

== Personal life ==
Ekong is the son of Nigeria international Prince Ikpe Ekong.

== Career statistics ==
As of match played 4 July 2026

Appearances and goals by club, season and competition
Club	Season	League			National cup		Europe		Other		Total	
Club	Season	Division	Apps	Goals	Apps	Goals	Apps	Goals	Apps	Goals	Apps	Goals
Empoli	2021–22	Serie A	0	0	0	0	—		—		0	0
Empoli	2022–23	Serie A	2	0	0	0	—		—		2	0
Empoli	2023–24	Serie A	1	0	1	0	—		—		2	0
Empoli	2024–25	Serie A	15	0	3	2	—		—		18	2
Empoli	Total		18	0	4	2	—		—		22	2
Perugia (loan)	2022–23	Serie B	9	0	—		—		—		9	0
NK Istra 1961 (loan)	2023–24	Croatian Football League	21	3	1	0	—		—		22	3
Malmö	2025	Allsvenskan	21	4	6	1	12 (Note: Five appearances in UEFA Champions League, seven appearances and one goal in UEFA Europa League)	1	—		39	6
Malmö	2026	Allsvenskan	4	0	4	0	2 (Note: Appearances in UEFA Europa League)	0	—		10	0
Malmö	Total		25	4	10	1	14	1	—		49	6
Career total			73	7	15	3	14	0	0	0	102	11
