= Nicolò Cambiaghi =

Italian footballer (born 2000)

Personal information
- Date of birth: 28 December 2000 (age 25)
- Place of birth: Monza, Italy
- Height: 1.73 m (5 ft 8 in)
- Position: Winger

Team information
- Current team: Bologna
- Number: 28

Youth career
- 2009-2020: Atalanta

Senior career*
Years	Team	Apps	(Gls)
2019–2024	Atalanta	0	(0)
2020–2021	→ Reggiana (loan)	18	(0)
2021–2022	→ Pordenone (loan)	36	(7)
2022–2024	→ Empoli (loan)	65	(7)
2024–	Bologna	53	(4)

International career^{‡}
2022–2023	Italy U21	10	(1)
2025–	Italy	4	(0)
- * Club domestic league appearances and goals as of 20:08, 17 October 2026 (UTC) ‡ National team caps and goals as of 22:40, 12 November 2026 (UTC)

Nicolò Cambiaghi (born 28 December 2000) is an Italian professional footballer who plays as a forward for Serie A club Bologna and the Italy national team.

== Club career ==
On 15 July 2021, Cambiaghi joined Serie B club Pordenone on a season-long loan. He appeared in a total of 37 matches, scoring seven goals.

Cambiaghi joined Serie A club Empoli on a season-long dry loan on 4 August 2022. The loan was renewed for the 2023–24 season on 25 August 2023.

Cambiaghi moved to Bologna on a permanent deal worth a reported €10 million plus bonuses on 12 July 2024.

== Career statistics ==
=== Club ===
As of match played 17 October 2026

Appearances and goals by club, season and competition
Club	Season	League			Coppa Italia		Europe		Other		Total	
Club	Season	Division	Apps	Goals	Apps	Goals	Apps	Goals	Apps	Goals	Apps	Goals
Reggiana (loan)	2020–21	Serie B	18	0	1	0	—		—		19	0
Pordenone (loan)	2021–22	Serie B	36	7	1	0	—		—		37	7
Empoli (loan)	2022–23	Serie A	28	6	1	1	—		—		29	7
Empoli (loan)	2023–24	Serie A	37	1	0	0	—		—		37	1
Empoli (loan)	Total		65	7	1	1	0	0	0	0	66	8
Bologna	2024–25	Serie A	18	1	2	0	0	0	—		20	1
Bologna	2025–26	Serie A	28	3	2	0	11 (Note: Appearances in UEFA Europa League)	1	1 (Note: Appearance in Supercoppa Italiana)	0	42	4
Bologna	2026–27	Serie A	7	0	0	0	—		—		7	0
Bologna	Total		53	4	4	0	11	1	1	0	69	5
Career totals			172	18	7	1	11	1	1	0	191	20

=== International ===
As of match played 12 November 2026

Appearances and goals by national team and year
National team	Year	Apps	Goals
Italy	2025	1	0
Italy	2026	3	0
Total		4	0

== Honours ==
Bologna

- Coppa Italia: 2024–25
