= Ewan Henderson (footballer) =

Scottish footballer (born 2000)

Personal information
- Full name: Ewan Henderson
- Date of birth: 27 March 2000 (age 26)
- Place of birth: Edinburgh, Scotland
- Height: 1.86 m (6 ft 1 in)
- Position: Midfielder

Team information
- Current team: Wycombe Wanderers
- Number: 20

Youth career
- –2017: Celtic

Senior career*
Years	Team	Apps	(Gls)
2017–2022	Celtic	8	(0)
2019–2020	→ Ross County (loan)	9	(0)
2021	→ Dunfermline Athletic (loan)	8	(1)
2022	→ Hibernian (loan)	16	(1)
2022–2024	Hibernian	31	(1)
2023–2024	→ Oostende (loan)	25	(4)
2024–2025	Beerschot	31	(3)
2025–	Wycombe Wanderers	42	(2)

International career^{‡}
2016	Scotland U17	1	(0)
2018–2019	Scotland U19	7	(1)
2019	Scotland U21	1	(0)
- * Club domestic league appearances and goals as of 20:37, 20 October 2026 (UTC) ‡ National team caps and goals as of 22:32, 10 October 2019 (UTC)

Ewan Henderson (born 27 March 2000) is a Scottish professional footballer who plays as a midfielder for EFL League One club Wycombe Wanderers. Henderson has previously played for Celtic, Ross County, Dunfermline Athletic, Hibernian, Oostende and Beerschot.

== Club career ==
=== Celtic ===
Henderson came through the Celtic youth ranks, winning the Glasgow Cup with the under-17 team in 2017, as well as featuring in the UEFA Youth League, Scottish Challenge Cup and Premier League International Cup. He made his senior debut for Celtic on 9 May 2018 against Kilmarnock in the Scottish Premiership.

He started his first game for Celtic on 24 February 2019, in a 4–1 home win over Motherwell in which he was named man of the match.

On 2 September 2019, he moved on loan to Ross County.

On 26 March 2021 he signed on loan for Dunfermline Athletic.

=== Hibernian ===
On 6 January 2022 he moved on loan to Hibernian, with the transfer to become permanent in the summer. On 23 April 2022, Henderson scored his first goal for Hibernian, which proved decisive in a 1–0 win at St Mirren in the Scottish Premiership.

On 23 August 2023, Henderson joined Belgian side Oostende on loan for the remainder of the 2023-24 season with an option to buy.

=== Beerschot ===
On 17 July 2024, Henderson signed a multi-year contract with Beerschot in Belgian Pro League.

=== Wycombe Wanderers ===
On 14 July 2025, Henderson signed for EFL League One club Wycombe Wanderers for an undisclosed fee.

== International career ==
Henderson represented Scotland at under-17 youth international level.

== Personal life ==
His older brother Liam is also a footballer, and has also played for Celtic and Hibernian. Their father Nicky was also a footballer.

== Career statistics ==
As of match played 20 October 2026

Appearances and goals by club, season and competition
Club	Season	League			National Cup		League Cup		Other		Total	
Club	Season	Division	Apps	Goals	Apps	Goals	Apps	Goals	Apps	Goals	Apps	Goals
Celtic Under-20s (Note: Matches in the Scottish Challenge Cup, in which teams from the SPFL Development League compete against senior clubs.)	2017–18	—							1	0	1	0
Celtic Under-21s	2018–19	—							1	0	1	0
Celtic	2017–18	Scottish Premiership	1	0	0	0	0	0	0	0	1	0
Celtic	2018–19	Scottish Premiership	5	0	1	0	0	0	0	0	6	0
Celtic	2019–20	Scottish Premiership	0	0	0	0	0	0	1 (Note: Appearance(s) in the UEFA Champions League.)	0	1	0
Celtic	2020–21	Scottish Premiership	2	0	0	0	0	0	1 (Note: Appearance(s) in the UEFA Europa League.)	0	3	0
Celtic	2021–22	Scottish Premiership	0	0	0	0	0	0	1	1	1	1
Celtic	Total		8	0	1	0	0	0	3	1	12	1
Ross County (loan)	2019–20	Scottish Premiership	9	0	1	0	0	0	—		10	0
Dunfermline Athletic (loan)	2020–21	Scottish Championship	8	1	0	0	0	0	2 (Note: Appearance(s) in the Premiership play-offs.)	0	10	1
Hibernian (loan)	2021–22	Scottish Premiership	16	1	4	0	0	0	—		20	1
Hibernian	2022–23	Scottish Premiership	30	1	1	0	4	3	—		35	4
Hibernian	2023–24	Scottish Premiership	1	0	0	0	0	0	—		1	0
Hibernian	Total		31	1	1	0	4	3	0	0	36	4
Oostende (loan)	2023–24	Challenger Pro League	25	4	5	3	0	0	—		30	7
Beerschot	2024–25	Belgian Pro League	31	3	1	0	0	0	—		32	3
Wycombe Wanderers	2025–26	EFL League One	31	1	0	0	2	0	1	0	34	1
Wycombe Wanderers	2026–27	EFL League One	11	1	0	0	1	1	1	0	13	1
Wycombe Wanderers	Total		42	2	0	0	3	1	2	0	47	3
Career total			170	12	13	3	6	3	9	1	199	19
