= Nicolas Haas =

Swiss footballer (born 1996)

Personal information
- Full name: Nicolas Thibault Haas
- Date of birth: 23 January 1996 (age 30)
- Place of birth: Sursee, Switzerland
- Height: 1.78 m (5 ft 10 in)
- Position: Midfielder

Team information
- Current team: Livorno
- Number: 32

Youth career
- Luzern

Senior career*
Years	Team	Apps	(Gls)
2013–2016	Luzern II	19	(9)
2015–2017	Luzern	55	(2)
2017–2021	Atalanta	9	(0)
2018–2019	→ Palermo (loan)	32	(1)
2019–2020	→ Frosinone (loan)	35	(0)
2020–2021	→ Empoli (loan)	34	(4)
2021–2026	Empoli	69	(1)
2023–2024	→ Luzern (loan)	22	(0)
2026–	Livorno	3	(0)

International career^{‡}
2011	Switzerland U15	4	(1)
2011–2012	Switzerland U16	5	(0)
2012	Switzerland U17	2	(0)
2015–2017	Switzerland U20	11	(0)
2016–2017	Switzerland U21	7	(1)
- * Club domestic league appearances and goals as of 3 October 2026 ‡ National team caps and goals as of 28 March 2019

Nicolas Thibault Haas (born 23 January 1996) is a Swiss professional footballer who plays as a midfielder for Serie C Group B club Livorno in Italy.

== Club career ==
Haas is a youth exponent from FC Luzern. He made his Swiss Super League debut at 7 February 2015 against BSC Young Boys replacing Adrian Winter after 87 minutes in a 1–1 home draw.

On 8 June 2017, he signed for Serie A side Atalanta, reportedly on a four-year contract, arriving as a free agent after leaving Lucerne at the end of his contract.

On 25 July 2018, Haas joined Serie B club Palermo on a season-long loan deal.

On 12 August 2019, Haas joined Serie B club Frosinone on loan until 30 June 2020.

On 25 September 2020, he joined Serie B club Empoli on loan. If Empoli were to be promoted to Serie A at the end of the 2020–21 season, Empoli was obligated to purchase his rights. That condition was fulfilled as Empoli was promoted.

On 3 September 2023, Haas returned to FC Luzern on a season-long loan deal with the option to purchase.

On 13 September 2026, Haas signed with Livorno in Serie C.

== Career statistics ==
=== Club ===
As of match played 8 November 2024

Appearances and goals by club, season and competition
Club	Season	League			Cup		Europe		Other		Total	
Club	Season	Division	Apps	Goals	Apps	Goals	Apps	Goals	Apps	Goals	Apps	Goals
FC Luzern	2014–15	Super League	8	0	0	0	–		–		8	0
FC Luzern	2015–16	Super League	24	1	5	0	–		–		29	1
FC Luzern	2016–17	Super League	23	1	3	0	2	0	–		28	1
FC Luzern	Total		55	2	8	0	2	0	0	0	65	2
Atalanta	2017–18	Serie A	9	0	2	0	0	0	–		11	0
Palermo (loan)	2018–19	Serie B	32	1	1	0	–		–		33	1
Frosinone (loan)	2019–20	Serie B	35	0	2	0	–		4 (Note: Appearances in Serie B promotion play-offs)	0	41	0
Empoli	2020–21	Serie B	34	4	3	0	–		–		37	4
Empoli	2021–22	Serie A	16	0	2	1	–		–		18	1
Empoli	2022–23	Serie A	24	1	1	0	–		–		25	1
Empoli	2023–24	Serie A	10	0	2	1	–		–		12	1
Empoli	Total		84	5	8	2	0	0	0	0	92	7
Career total			215	8	21	2	2	0	4	0	242	10
