= Fabiano Parisi =

Italian footballer (born 2000)

Personal information
- Date of birth: 9 November 2000 (age 26)
- Place of birth: Solofra, Italy
- Height: 1.78 m (5 ft 10 in)
- Position: Left-back

Team information
- Current team: Fiorentina
- Number: 65

Youth career
- 2015–2016: Pro Irpinia
- 2016–2017: Vigor Perconti
- 2017–2018: Benevento

Senior career*
Years	Team	Apps	(Gls)
2018–2019	Benevento	0	(0)
2018–2019	→ Avellino (loan)	36	(0)
2019–2020	Avellino	27	(4)
2020–2023	Empoli	78	(3)
2023–	Fiorentina	70	(3)

International career^{‡}
2021–2023	Italy U21	11	(1)
- * Club domestic league appearances and goals as of 17 May 2026 (UTC) ‡ National team caps and goals as of 28 June 2023

Fabiano Parisi (born 9 November 2000) is an Italian professional footballer who plays as a left-back for Serie A club Fiorentina.

He is nicknamed "Il pendolino di Serino" by Avellino supporters and fellow team members.

== Club career ==
=== Pro Irpinia and Vigor Perconti ===
Parisi started playing football in Pro Irpina Club, based in the city of his childhood, Serino. Then he was noticed by the Roman club of Vigor Perconti, with which Parisi played for the 2016–17 season of Allievi Élite of Lazio League, winning the title and reaching the Final Six Scudetto.

=== Benevento ===
In 2017 he was noticed by the youth sector head of Benevento, Simone Puleo, who was an historic captain of U.S. Avellino. Parisi played in the Campionato Primavera 2 collecting 18 appearances, as well as 1 in Coppa Italia Primavera and 3 in Torneo di Viareggio.

=== Avellino ===
In the summer of 2018, Parisi joined Avellino, following the club's exclusion from Serie B and successive restart from Serie D, signing on loan from Benevento for the 2018–19 season.

In his first season, Parisi collected 41 appearances between regular season, play-off and Poule Scudetto Serie D, turned out to be decisive in several matches, and eventually being instrumental in Avellino being promoted back to Serie C on their first season of asking.

He was successively made a permanent signing for the following season. Under the guidance of Ezio Capuano as head coach, he impressed in his performances, providing assist and scoring goals, and being nominated best Under-19 football player of Group C, resulting seventh between all Serie C groups.

=== Empoli ===
On 22 September 2020, Parisi signed a three-year contract with Serie B club Empoli. At the end of the season he won the league with the Tuscanians, thus ensuring his first promotion to Serie A in his career.

=== Fiorentina ===
On 14 July 2023, Parisi signed for Fiorentina on a permanent contract.

== International career ==
In November 2022, he received his first call-up to the Italy senior national team by head coach Roberto Mancini for a friendly match against Austria.

== Career statistics ==
As of match played 17 May 2026

Appearances and goals by club, season and competition
Club	Season	League			National cup		Continental		Other		Total	
Club	Season	Division	Apps	Goals	Apps	Goals	Apps	Goals	Apps	Goals	Apps	Goals
Benevento	2018–19	Serie B	0	0	0	0	—		0	0	0	0
Avellino (loan)	2018–19	Serie D	36	0	4	0	—		1 (Note: Appearance in Scudetto Serie D)	0	41	0
Avellino	2019–20	Serie C	27	4	4	0	—		1 (Note: Appearance in Serie C promotion play-offs)	0	32	4
Empoli	2020–21	Serie B	20	1	2	0	—		—		22	1
Empoli	2021–22	Serie A	25	0	0	0	—		—		25	0
Empoli	2022–23	Serie A	33	2	1	0	—		—		34	2
Empoli	Total		78	3	3	0	—		0	0	81	3
Fiorentina	2023–24	Serie A	20	0	3	0	8 (Note: Appearances in UEFA Conference League)	0	1 (Note: Appearance in Supercoppa Italiana)	0	32	0
Fiorentina	2024–25	Serie A	27	2	1	0	13	0	—		41	2
Fiorentina	2025–26	Serie A	23	1	0	0	9	0	—		32	1
Fiorentina	Total		70	3	4	0	30	0	1	0	105	3
Career total			211	10	15	0	30	0	3	0	259	10

== Honours ==
Empoli

- Serie B: 2020–21
