= Sebastiano Luperto =

Italian footballer

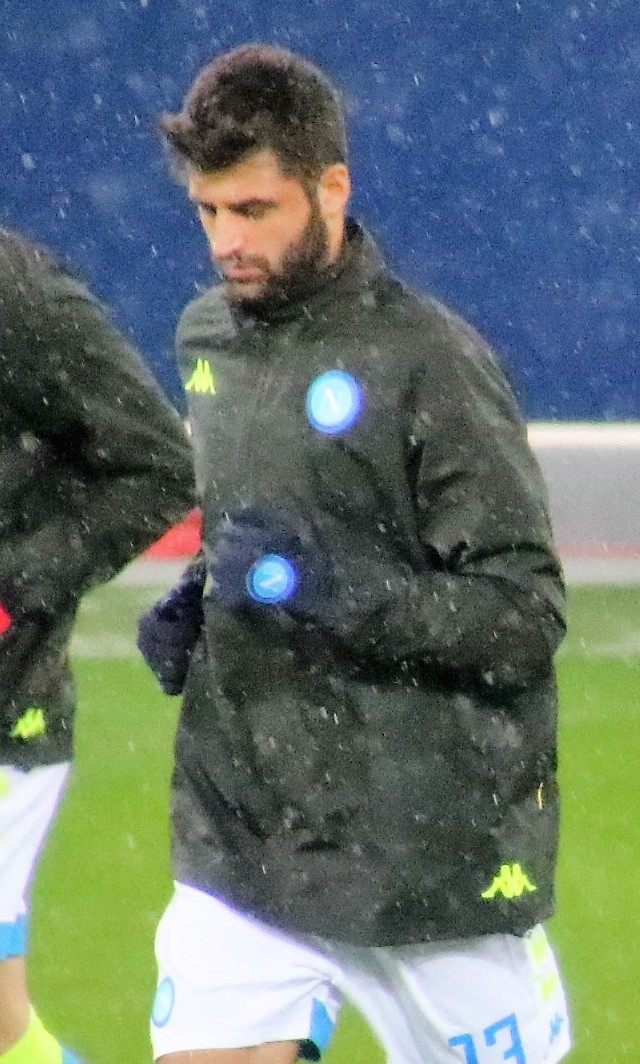
- Luperto with Napoli in 2019

Personal information
- Date of birth: 6 September 1996 (age 30)
- Place of birth: Lecce, Italy
- Height: 1.91 m (6 ft 3 in)
- Position: Centre-back

Team information
- Current team: Cremonese
- Number: 5

Youth career
- Lecce
- –2015: Napoli

Senior career*
Years	Team	Apps	(Gls)
2015–2023	Napoli	22	(0)
2016–2017	→ Pro Vercelli (loan)	32	(0)
2017–2018	→ Empoli (loan)	28	(2)
2020–2021	→ Crotone (loan)	23	(0)
2021–2023	→ Empoli (loan)	60	(2)
2023–2024	Empoli	38	(1)
2024–2026	Cagliari	55	(2)
2026–	Cremonese	15	(0)

International career^{‡}
2014	Italy U18	6	(1)
2014	Italy U19	2	(0)
2015–2016	Italy U20	4	(0)
2018–2019	Italy U21	5	(0)
- * Club domestic league appearances and goals as of 25 May 2026 ‡ National team caps and goals as of 25 March 2019

Sebastiano Luperto (born 6 September 1996) is an Italian professional footballer who plays as a centre-back for Serie B club Cremonese.

== Club career ==
Luperto is a youth exponent from Napoli. He made his Serie A debut on 3 May 2015 against Milan replacing David López after 84 minutes in a 3–0 home win.

On 5 October 2020, he joined Crotone on loan.

On 13 August 2021, Luperto moved on loan to Empoli. On 18 July 2022, he returned to Empoli on a new loan with an obligation to buy.

=== Empoli ===
On 1 July 2023, Luperto officially joined Empoli for €2.5 million.

=== Cagliari ===
On 8 July 2024, Luperto officially joined Cagliari from Empoli for €3.5 million.

=== Cremonese ===
On 2 February 2026, Luperto moved to Cremonese.

== International career ==
On 25 May 2018, Luperto made his debut with the Italy U21 team in a friendly match lost 3–2 against Portugal.

== Career statistics ==
=== Club ===
As of match played 24 August 2025

Appearances and goals by club, season and competition
Club	Season	League			Cup		Europe		Other		Total	
Club	Season	Division	Apps	Goals	Apps	Goals	Apps	Goals	Apps	Goals	Apps	Goals
Lecce (loan)	2013–14	Lega Pro	0	0	3	0	–		–		3	0
Napoli	2014–15	Serie A	1	0	0	0	–		–		1	0
Napoli	2015–16	Serie A	0	0	0	0	1	0	–		1	0
Napoli	2018–19	Serie A	12	0	0	0	3	0	–		15	0
Napoli	2019–20	Serie A	9	0	1	0	2	0	–		12	0
Napoli	Total		22	0	1	0	6	0	0	0	29	0
Pro Vercelli (loan)	2016–17	Serie B	32	0	0	0	–		–		32	0
Empoli (loan)	2017–18	Serie B	28	2	0	0	–		–		28	2
Crotone (loan)	2020–21	Serie A	23	0	0	0	–		–		23	0
Empoli (loan)	2021–22	Serie A	24	0	1	0	–		–		25	0
Empoli (loan)	2022–23	Serie A	34	2	1	0	–		–		35	2
Empoli	2023–24	Serie A	38	1	1	0	–		–		39	1
Empoli	Total		124	5	3	0	0	0	0	0	127	5
Cagliari	2024–25	Serie A	36	1	1	0	–		–		37	1
Cagliari	2025–26	Serie A	1	1	0	0	–		–		1	1
Cagliari	Total		37	2	1	0	0	0	0	0	38	2
Career total			238	7	8	0	6	0	0	0	252	7

== Honours ==
Empoli

- Serie B: 2017–18

Napoli

- Coppa Italia: 2019–20
