= Alberto Grassi =

Italian footballer (born 1995)

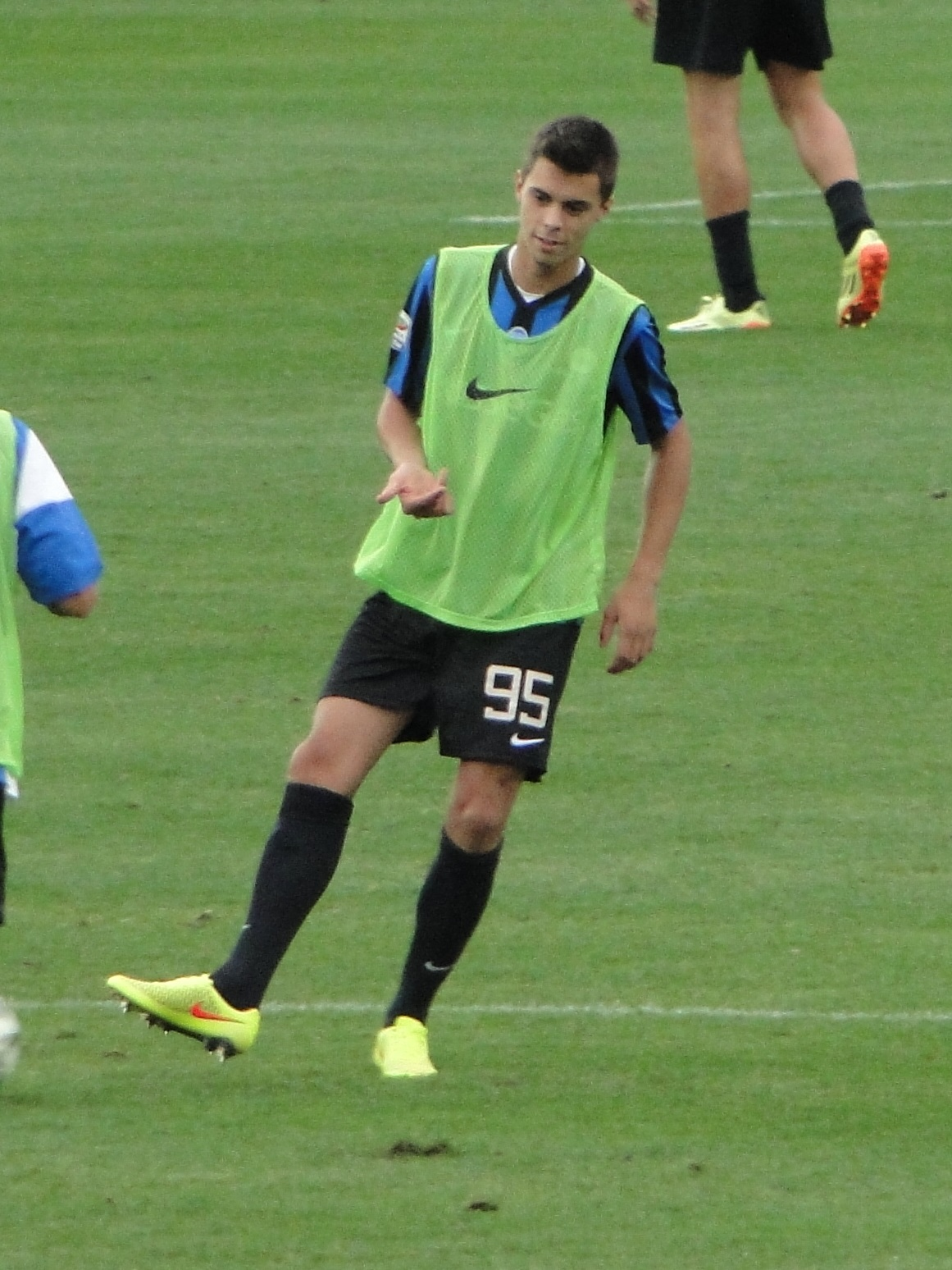
- Grassi with Atalanta in 2014

Personal information
- Date of birth: 7 March 1995 (age 31)
- Place of birth: Brescia, Italy
- Height: 1.85 m (6 ft 1 in)
- Position: Defensive midfielder

Team information
- Current team: Cremonese
- Number: 33

Youth career
- 2010–2014: Atalanta

Senior career*
Years	Team	Apps	(Gls)
2014–2016	Atalanta	16	(0)
2016–2020	Napoli	0	(0)
2016–2017	→ Atalanta (loan)	18	(1)
2017–2018	→ SPAL (loan)	28	(3)
2018–2020	→ Parma (loan)	23	(1)
2020–2023	Parma	23	(0)
2021–2022	→ Cagliari (loan)	30	(0)
2022–2023	→ Empoli (loan)	25	(0)
2023–2025	Empoli	55	(1)
2025–	Cremonese	30	(0)

International career^{‡}
2011–2012	Italy U17	12	(0)
2014	Italy U19	4	(1)
2014–2015	Italy U20	7	(0)
2015–2017	Italy U21	12	(0)
- * Club domestic league appearances and goals as of 25 May 2026 ‡ National team caps and goals as of 21 June 2017

Alberto Grassi (born 7 March 1995) is an Italian professional footballer who plays as a defensive midfielder for Serie B club Cremonese.

== Club career ==
=== Atalanta ===
Born in Brescia, Grassi began his career in Atalanta's youth setup. On 29 May 2012, he signed his first professional deal, after being promoted to the club's Primavera squad.

Grassi was definitely assigned to the main squad in August 2014, after impressing manager Stefano Colantuono in the pre-season. He played his first match as a professional on 22 November, replacing fellow youth graduate Daniele Baselli in the 69th minute of a 2–1 Serie A home loss against Roma.

On 2 October 2015, Grassi renewed his contract until 2020.

=== Napoli ===
On 27 January 2016, Grassi joined Napoli for a fee of €10 million.

==== Atalanta ====
On 30 August 2016, Grassi was loaned back to Atalanta.

=== Parma ===
After initially joining Parma on loan for the 2018–19 season, he returned to the club on a new loan for the 2019–20 season with an obligation to buy at the end of the season.

==== Loan to Cagliari ====
On 21 August 2021, he was loaned to Cagliari, with an option to buy. If certain conditions were met, the option would have become an obligation to buy.

==== Loan to Empoli ====
On 17 August 2022, Grassi joined Empoli on loan with an option to buy and a conditional obligation to buy.

=== Cremonese ===
On 19 July 2025, Grassi joined recently Serie A promoted club Cremonese permanently.

== International career ==
On 12 August 2015, he made his debut with the Italy U21 team, in a friendly match against Hungary.

In June 2017, he was included in the Italy under-21 squad for the 2017 UEFA European Under-21 Championship by manager Luigi Di Biagio. Italy were eliminated in the semi-finals following a 3–1 defeat to Spain on 27 June.

== Career statistics ==
=== Club ===
As of match played 25 May 2025

Appearances and goals by club, season and competition
Club	Season	League			National Cup		Continental		Other		Total	
Club	Season	Division	Apps	Goals	Apps	Goals	Apps	Goals	Apps	Goals	Apps	Goals
Atalanta	2014–15	Serie A	3	0	1	0	—		—		4	0
Atalanta	2015–16	Serie A	13	0	1	0	—		—		14	0
Atalanta	Total		16	0	2	0	0	0	0	0	18	0
Napoli	2015–16	Serie A	0	0	0	0	—		—		0	0
Atalanta (loan)	2016–17	Serie A	18	1	2	1	—		—		20	2
S.P.A.L. (loan)	2017–18	Serie A	28	3	0	0	—		—		28	3
Parma (loan)	2018–19	Serie A	7	0	0	0	—		—		7	0
Parma (loan)	2019–20	Serie A	16	1	1	0	—		—		17	1
Parma (loan)	2020–21	Serie A	23	0	0	0	—		—		23	0
Parma (loan)	Total		46	1	1	0	0	0	0	0	47	1
Cagliari (loan)	2021–22	Serie A	30	0	1	0	—		—		31	0
Empoli (loan)	2022–23	Serie A	25	0	0	0	—		—		25	0
Empoli	2023–24	Serie A	27	0	1	0	—		—		28	0
Empoli	2024–25	Serie A	28	1	3	0	—		—		31	1
Empoli	Total		80	1	4	0	0	0	0	0	84	1
Career total			218	6	10	1	0	0	0	0	228	7
