= Youssef Maleh =

Moroccan footballer (born 1998)

Youssef Maleh يوسف مالح
Personal information
- Date of birth: 22 August 1998 (age 28)
- Place of birth: Castel San Pietro Terme, Italy
- Height: 1.77 m (5 ft 10 in)
- Position: Midfielder

Team information
- Current team: Lecce

Youth career
- –2017: Cesena

Senior career*
Years	Team	Apps	(Gls)
2016–2018	Cesena	0	(0)
2018	→ Ravenna (loan)	9	(0)
2018–2021	Venezia	38	(2)
2018–2019	→ Ravenna (loan)	23	(1)
2021–2023	Fiorentina	35	(2)
2021	→ Venezia (loan)	23	(4)
2023	→ Lecce (loan)	17	(0)
2023–	Lecce	9	(0)
2023–2025	→ Empoli (loan)	56	(0)
2026	→ Cremonese (loan)	14	(1)

International career^{‡}
2020–2021	Italy U21	5	(1)
2021–	Morocco	1	(0)
- * Club domestic league appearances and goals as of 25 May 2026 ‡ National team caps and goals as of 23 June 2023 (UTC)

Youssef Maleh (Arabic: يوسف مالح; born 22 August 1998) is a professional footballer who plays as a midfielder for Serie A club Lecce. Born in Italy, he plays for the Morocco national team.

== Club career ==
Maleh began his career at Cesena and made his professional debut while on loan at Ravenna on 27 January 2018, in a Serie C 1–1 draw to Teramo. On 31 July 2018, he signed for Venezia and subsequently rejoined Ravenna on another loan for the 2018–19 season.

On 21 January 2021, Fiorentina announced the signing of Maleh on a permanent deal, while also confirming that he would finish the 2020–21 season at Venezia.

On 3 January 2023, Maleh joined Lecce on loan until the end of the season. Lecce held an obligation to buy his rights if the club remained in Serie A.

On 31 August 2023, Maleh moved on loan to Empoli, with an option to buy.

On 31 January 2026, he joined Cremonese on loan, with a conditional obligation to buy.

== International career ==
Maleh was born in Italy and is of Moroccan descent. He made his debut with the Italy U21 on 3 September 2020, in a friendly match won 2–1 against Slovenia.

In August 2021, Maleh was first called up to the Morocco national team for the 2022 FIFA World Cup qualification games against Sudan and Guinea in September.

== Career statistics ==
=== Club ===
As of match played 21 March 2026

Appearances and goals by club, season and competition
Club	Season	League			National Cup		Continental		Total	
Club	Season	Division	Apps	Goals	Apps	Goals	Apps	Goals	Apps	Goals
Ravenna (loan)	2017–18	Serie C	9	0	—		—		9	0
Ravenna (loan)	2018–19	Serie C	23	1	2	0	—		25	1
Ravenna (loan)	Total		32	1	2	0	0	0	34	1
Venezia	2019–20	Serie B	28	1	2	0	—		30	1
Venezia	2020–21	Serie B	33	5	0	0	—		33	5
Venezia	Total		61	6	2	0	0	0	63	6
Fiorentina	2021–22	Serie A	28	2	5	1	—		33	3
Fiorentina	2022–23	Serie A	7	0	0	0	5	0	12	0
Fiorentina	Total		35	2	5	1	5	0	45	3
Lecce (loan)	2022–23	Serie A	17	0	—		—		17	0
Empoli (loan)	2023–24	Serie A	34	0	—		—		34	0
Empoli (loan)	2024–25	Serie A	22	0	2	1	—		24	1
Empoli (loan)	Total		56	0	2	1	0	0	58	1
Lecce	2025–26	Serie A	9	0	0	0	—		9	0
Cremonese (loan)	2025–26	Serie A	8	1	—		—		8	1
Career total			218	10	11	2	5	0	234	12
