= Filippo Bandinelli =

Italian footballer (born 1995)

Personal information
- Date of birth: 29 March 1995 (age 31)
- Place of birth: Florence, Italy
- Height: 1.80 m (5 ft 11 in)
- Position: Midfielder

Team information
- Current team: Empoli
- Number: 23

Youth career
- Fiorentina

Senior career*
Years	Team	Apps	(Gls)
2015–2016	Fiorentina	0	(0)
2015–2016	→ Latina (loan)	8	(0)
2016–2017	Latina	29	(0)
2017–2019	Sassuolo	0	(0)
2017–2018	→ Perugia (loan)	29	(1)
2018–2019	→ Benevento (loan)	31	(4)
2019–2023	Empoli	117	(5)
2023–2026	Spezia	77	(2)
2026–	Empoli	2	(0)
- * Club domestic league appearances and goals as of 20 September 2026

Filippo Bandinelli (born 29 March 1995) is an Italian professional footballer who plays as a midfielder for Serie B club Empoli.

== Club career ==
He made his professional debut in the Serie B for Latina on 27 October 2015 in a game against Ternana.

On 2 August 2018, Bandinelli joined to Benevento on loan until 30 June 2019.

On 13 July 2019, he signed with Empoli.

On 21 July 2023, Bandinelli signed a four-year contract with Spezia.

== Career statistics ==
=== Club ===
As of match played 23 August 2023

Appearances and goals by club, season and competition
Club	Season	League			National Cup (Note: Includes Coppa Italia)		Europe		Other		Total	
Club	Season	Division	Apps	Goals	Apps	Goals	Apps	Goals	Apps	Goals	Apps	Goals
Latina	2015–16	Serie B	8	0	0	0	—		—		8	0
Latina	2016–17	Serie B	30	0	0	0	—		—		30	0
Latina	Total		38	0	0	0	—		—		38	0
Perugia (loan)	2017–18	Serie B	29	1	2	0	—		—		31	1
Benevento (loan)	2018–19	Serie B	29	4	4	2	—		2 (Note: Appearance(s) in Serie B play-off)	0	35	6
Empoli	2019–20	Serie B	29	1	3	0	—		1	0	33	1
Empoli	2020–21	Serie B	18	0	1	0	—		—		19	0
Empoli	2021–22	Serie A	35	2	3	0	—		—		38	2
Empoli	2022–23	Serie A	35	2	1	0	—		—		36	2
Empoli	Total		117	5	8	0	—		1	0	126	5
Career total			213	10	14	2	—		3	0	230	12
