= Guglielmo Vicario =

Italian footballer (born 1996)

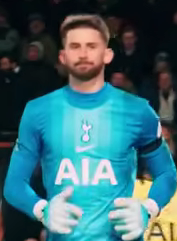
- Vicario with Tottenham Hotspur in 2026

Personal information
- Full name: Guglielmo Vicario
- Date of birth: 7 October 1996 (age 30)
- Place of birth: Udine, Italy
- Height: 1.94 m (6 ft 4 in)
- Position: Goalkeeper

Team information
- Current team: Juventus (on loan from Tottenham Hotspur)
- Number: 25

Youth career
- Donatello Calcio
- Bearzi
- Cormor Calcio
- 2012–2013: Ancona Udine
- 2013–2014: Udinese

Senior career*
Years	Team	Apps	(Gls)
2014–2016	Udinese	0	(0)
2014–2015	→ Fontanafredda (loan)	30	(0)
2015–2016	→ Venezia (loan)	36	(0)
2016–2019	Venezia	41	(0)
2019–2022	Cagliari	4	(0)
2019–2020	→ Perugia (loan)	37	(0)
2021–2022	→ Empoli (loan)	38	(0)
2022–2023	Empoli	31	(0)
2023–	Tottenham Hotspur	93	(0)
2026–	→ Juventus (loan)	12	(0)

International career^{‡}
2024–	Italy	5	(0)
Medal record
Men's Football
Representing Italy
UEFA Nations League
Third place	2023 Netherlands
- * Club domestic league appearances and goals as of 23:49, 22 November 2026 (UTC) ‡ National team caps and goals as of 22:34, 13 November 2025 (UTC)

Guglielmo Vicario (born 7 October 1996) is an Italian professional footballer who plays as a goalkeeper for Serie A club Juventus, on loan from Premier League club Tottenham Hotspur, and the Italy national team.

Vicario started his professional career at Udinese but never played a first team match for the club. After a loan move to Fontanafredda, he joined Venezia, before signing for Cagliari in 2019, where he featured rarely and was subsequently loaned out to Perugia and Empoli. He signed permanently with the latter in 2022 before joining Premier League side Tottenham Hotspur in 2023 where he won his first major trophy, the 2024–25 UEFA Europa League.

== Club career ==
=== Early career ===
Born in Udine, Vicario played for the youth sides of Donatello Calcio Udine, ASD Bearzi Calcio, ASD Cormor Calcio Amatori and ASD Ancona Udine before joining Udinese's Primavera squad in 2013. At the latter club, he was mainly a third-choice behind Alex Meret and Simone Scuffet, and joined Serie D side Fontanafredda on loan for the 2014–15 season.

=== Venezia ===
In 2015, Vicario moved to Venezia also in the Serie D, also on loan from Udinese. On 5 July 2016, after being a regular starter as the club achieved promotion, he signed a permanent contract.

A backup to Davide Facchin during most of the season, Vicario made his Lega Pro debut on 5 March 2017, starting in a 4–1 away win over Teramo. He appeared in a further two matches as Venezia achieved a second consecutive promotion.

After spending the 2017–18 Serie B as a second-choice to new signing Emil Audero, Vicario became Venezia's starting goalkeeper in the 2018–19 campaign, as they almost avoided relegation.

=== Cagliari ===
On 17 July 2019, Vicario signed a five-year contract with Cagliari. Eight days later, he joined Perugia on a season-long loan.

A regular starter for Perugia, Vicario returned to Cagliari in July 2020, and made his Serie A debut on 11 April 2021, starting in a 1–0 away loss to Inter Milan.

=== Empoli ===
On 9 July 2021, Vicario joined fellow Serie A team Empoli on loan with an option to purchase. On 18 June 2022, Empoli exercised their purchase option.

On 4 February 2023, Vicario performed a triple save in a league match against Roma which resulted in a defeat, while his consecutive saves were applauded by many spectators.

=== Tottenham Hotspur ===
On 27 June 2023, Tottenham Hotspur announced the signing of Vicario on a five-year deal. Vicario made his debut for Tottenham on 14 August in the club's first match of the 2023–24 Premier League season, starting in an away match against Brentford. Vicario kept his first clean sheet for Tottenham in his next match, on 19 August 2023, a 2–0 win against Manchester United.

Vicario was nominated for Save of the Month in five consecutive months, from August 2023 to December 2023, and again in February 2024. On 29 February 2024, Vicario won the Goalkeeper of the Year award at the London Football Awards. Following a collision with Savinho during a match between Spurs and Manchester City on 23 November that year, Vicario broke a bone in his ankle; he finished the game despite this, keeping a clean sheet in a 4–0 win.

After 3 months on the sidelines following this injury, Vicario returned in goal against Manchester United at home on 16 February 2025, keeping a 1–0 clean sheet.

On 21 May 2025, he started in the 2025 UEFA Europa League final against Manchester United. Tottenham ended up winning the match 1–0 as Vicario kept a clean sheet and won his first professional trophy, as well as Tottenham's first trophy in 17 years.

During the 2025–26 season, Vicario struggled for form and fitness. He did not feature for Tottenham after undergoing hernia surgery in March 2026. Antonín Kinský, who played in Vicario's absence, impressed the new manager Roberto De Zerbi with his performance and established himself as the first-choice goalkeeper.

==== Loan to Juventus ====
On 18 August, Vicario joined Serie A club Juventus on a season-long loan, with the option to make the move permanent for €8 million.

== International career ==
Vicario received his first Italy national team call-up in September 2022 as manager Roberto Mancini named him to be part of the squad for the UEFA Nations League games against England and Hungary.

Vicario made his debut with Italy on 24 March 2024, keeping a clean sheet in a 2–0 win against Ecuador in a friendly match.

In May 2024, Vicario was named in the provisional Italy squad for UEFA Euro 2024. In June, he was included in Italy's final 26-man squad for UEFA Euro 2024, as a back-up goalkeeper to Gianluigi Donnarumma, by manager Luciano Spalletti. Italy were eliminated from the tournament in the round of 16 following a 2–0 loss to Switzerland.

== Style of play ==
In his prime, Vicario was known for his consistency, athleticism, and his quick and explosive reflexes, despite his tall stature, which made him an excellent shot-stopper. He has been described as a "ball-playing goalkeeper," in the media, due to his penchant for playing with his feet and acting as a "sweeper keeper," even though his ability with his feet was initially cited as a weakness in his game; however, he showed significant improvements in this aspect of the game during his time at Tottenham. He has cited former Inter goalkeeper, Samir Handanović, as a major influence. Due to his goalkeeping ability and his intense and fiery temperament, he has been given the nickname "Venom Vicario" by his fans, a reference to the Marvel character of the same name. In his youth, Venezia fans nicknamed him "fagiolino" ("green bean," in English), a reference to his slender physical build at the time.

== Career statistics ==
=== Club ===
As of match played 22 November 2026

Appearances and goals by club, season and competition
Club	Season	League			National cup (Note: Includes Coppa Italia, FA Cup)		League cup (Note: Includes EFL Cup)		Europe		Other		Total	
Club	Season	Division	Apps	Goals	Apps	Goals	Apps	Goals	Apps	Goals	Apps	Goals	Apps	Goals
Udinese	2013–14	Serie A	0	0	0	0	—		—		—		0	0
Fontanafredda (loan)	2014–15	Serie D	30	0	—		—		—		—		30	0
Venezia	2015–16	Serie D	36	0	—		—		—		2 (Note: Appearances in Serie D Scudetto Dilettanti)	0	38	0
Venezia	2016–17	Serie C	2	0	—		—		—		8 (Note: Seven appearances in Coppa Italia Lega Pro, one appearance in Supercoppa di Lega Pro)	0	10	0
Venezia	2017–18	Serie B	7	0	0	0	—		—		0	0	7	0
Venezia	2018–19	Serie B	32	0	0	0	—		—		2 (Note: Appearances in Serie B relegation play-offs)	0	34	0
Venezia	Total		77	0	0	0	—		—		12	0	89	0
Perugia (loan)	2019–20	Serie B	35	0	2	0	—		—		2	0	39	0
Cagliari	2020–21	Serie A	4	0	3	0	—		—		—		7	0
Empoli (loan)	2021–22	Serie A	38	0	1	0	—		—		—		39	0
Empoli	2022–23	Serie A	31	0	1	0	—		—		—		32	0
Empoli	Empoli total		69	0	2	0	—		—		—		71	0
Tottenham Hotspur	2023–24	Premier League	38	0	2	0	0	0	—		—		40	0
Tottenham Hotspur	2024–25	Premier League	24	0	0	0	1	0	9 (Note: Appearances in UEFA Europa League)	0	—		34	0
Tottenham Hotspur	2025–26	Premier League	31	0	1	0	0	0	10 (Note: Appearances in UEFA Champions League)	0	1 (Note: Appearance in UEFA Super Cup)	0	43	0
Tottenham Hotspur	Total		93	0	3	0	1	0	19	0	1	0	117	0
Juventus (loan)	2026–27	Serie A	12	0	0	0	—		3	0	—		15	0
Career total			320	0	10	0	1	0	22	0	15	0	368	0

=== International ===
As of match played 13 November 2025

Appearances and goals by national team and year
National team	Year	Apps	Goals
Italy	2024	4	0
Italy	2025	1	0
Total		5	0

== Honours ==
Venezia

- Serie C/Serie C1: 2016–17
- Coppa Italia Lega Pro: 2016–17

Tottenham Hotspur

- UEFA Europa League: 2024–25
- UEFA Super Cup runner-up: 2025

Italy

- UEFA Nations League third place: 2022–23

Individual

- Premier League Save of the Month: April 2025
- London Football Awards Goalkeeper of the Year: 2024
- UEFA Europa League Team of the Season: 2024–25
