= Jacopo Fazzini =

Italian footballer

Personal information
- Date of birth: 16 March 2003 (age 23)
- Place of birth: Massa, Italy
- Height: 1.78 m (5 ft 10 in)
- Position: Midfielder

Team information
- Current team: Cagliari (on loan from Fiorentina)
- Number: 10

Youth career
- Viareggio
- –2017: Capezzano
- 2017–2025: Empoli

Senior career*
Years	Team	Apps	(Gls)
2022–2025	Empoli	72	(5)
2025–	Fiorentina	20	(0)
2026–	→ Cagliari (loan)	0	(0)

International career^{‡}
2019	Italy U17	3	(0)
2021	Italy U18	1	(0)
2021–2022	Italy U19	7	(0)
2022–2023	Italy U20	6	(0)
2023–2025	Italy U21	5	(0)
- * Club domestic league appearances and goals as of 22:45, 4 May 2026 (UTC) ‡ National team caps and goals as of 22 June 2025

Jacopo Fazzini (born 16 March 2003) is an Italian professional footballer who plays as midfielder for Serie A club Cagliari, on loan from Fiorentina.

== Personal life ==
Fazzini's grandfather, Giorgio was a tennis player. His brother, Tommaso is a beach soccer player.

== Club career ==
Fazzini grew up with Viareggio, Capezzano and Empoli. In the 2020–21 season, Fazzini won the league with the under-19s team. He made his debut on 19 January 2022, in a 3–2 Coppa Italia defeat against Inter after extra-time, coming on as substitute in the 97th minute.

On 25 June 2025, Fazzini signed for Fiorentina for a reported €10 million plus bonuses.

== International career ==
On 12 September 2023 he made his debut with the Italy U21, in the qualifying match won 2–0 against Turkey.

== Career statistics ==
As of match played 4 May 2026

Appearances and goals by club, season and competition
Club	Season	League			National Cup (Note: Includes Coppa Italia)		Europe		Total	
Club	Season	Division	Apps	Goals	Apps	Goals	Apps	Goals	Apps	Goals
Empoli	2021–22	Serie A	0	0	1	0	0	0	1	0
Empoli	2022–23	Serie A	21	0	1	0	0	0	22	0
Empoli	2023–24	Serie A	31	1	0	0	0	0	31	1
Empoli	2024–25	Serie A	20	4	2	2	0	0	22	6
Empoli	Total		72	5	4	2	0	0	76	7
Fiorentina	2025–26	Serie A	20	0	1	0	11 (Note: Appearances in UEFA Conference League)	0	32	0
Career total			92	5	5	2	11	0	108	7
