= 2010–11 Frosinone Calcio season =

Frosinone Calcio
2010–11 season
- Manager: Guido Carboni (until 8 January); Salvatore Campilongo (from 8 January)
- Stadium: Stadio Matusa
- Serie B: 22nd (relegated)
- Coppa Italia: Third round
- Top goalscorer: Gianluca Sansone (10)
Home colours	Away colours

The 2010–11 season was Frosinone Calcio's 83rd season in existence and fifth consecutive in the Serie B. They also competed in the Serie B.

== Players ==
=== First-team squad ===
Note: Flags indicate national team as defined under FIFA eligibility rules; some limited exceptions apply. Players may hold more than one non-FIFA nationality.

No.	Pos.	Nation	Player
—	GK	ITA	Alberto Frison
—	GK	ITA	Vincenzo Sicignano
—	GK	ITA	Pierluigi Frattali
—	GK	ITA	Matteo Vaccarecci
—	GK	ITA	Valerio Scarsella
—	DF	ITA	Emanuele Terranova
—	DF	ITA	Emir Faccioli
—	DF	FRA	Sebastien De Maio
—	DF	ITA	Simone Grippo
—	DF	ITA	Mauro Minelli
—	DF	ITA	Nicholas Guidi
—	MF	ITA	Francesco Lodi
—	MF	ITA	Nicola Beati
—	MF	AUT	Robert Gucher
—	MF	ITA	Francesco Di Tacchio
—	MF	AUS	Adrian Ucchino
—	MF	ITA	Manolo Pestrin
—	MF	ITA	Davide Bottone
—	MF	ITA	Davide Caremi

No.	Pos.	Nation	Player
—	MF	ITA	Mattia Biso
—	MF	ITA	Alfredo Cariello
—	MF	ITA	Salvatore Aurelio
—	MF	ITA	Simone Basso
—	MF	ITA	Pasquale Maisto
—	MF	ITA	Luca Paganini
—	FW	ITA	Leandro Campagna
—	FW	FRA	Allan Baclet
—	FW	ITA	Gaetano Masucci
—	FW	ITA	Gianmarco Zigoni
—	FW	ITA	Gianluca Sansone
—	FW	ITA	Vincenzo Santoruvo
—	FW	ITA	Caetano Calil
—	FW	ITA	Samuel Di Carmine
—	FW	ITA	Cristian Cesaretti
—	FW	POR	Diogo Tavares
—	FW	ITA	Roberto Stellone
—	FW	ITA	Andrea La Mantia

== Competitions ==
=== Overall record ===
Competition	First match	Last match	Starting round	Final position	Record							
Competition	First match	Last match	Starting round	Final position	Pld	W	D	L	GF	GA	GD	Win %
Serie B	22 August 2010	29 May 2011	Matchday 1	22nd	42	8	14	20	46	64	−18	19.05
Coppa Italia	16 August 2010	27 October 2010	Second round	Third round	2	1	0	1	5	5	+0	50.00
Total					44	9	14	21	51	69	−18	20.45

Source: Competitions

=== Serie B ===
==== League table ====
Pos	Team	Pld	W	D	L	GF	GA	GD	Pts	Promotion or relegation
18	AlbinoLeffe	42	13	10	19	55	66	−11	49	Qualification to relegation play-offs
19	Piacenza (R)	42	11	13	18	50	63	−13	46	Qualification to relegation play-offs
20	Triestina (R)	42	8	16	18	34	57	−23	40 (Note: TRI 0–0 POR ; POR 1–2 TRI)	Relegation to Lega Pro Prima Divisione
21	Portogruaro (R)	42	10	10	22	39	63	−24	40	Relegation to Lega Pro Prima Divisione
22	Frosinone (R)	42	8	14	20	46	64	−18	38	Relegation to Lega Pro Prima Divisione

Source: Lega Serie B
Rules for classification: 1st points, 2nd head-to-head, 3rd goal difference, 4th goals for
(R) Relegated

==== Results summary ====
Overall								Home						Away					
Pld	W	D	L	GF	GA	GD	Pts	W	D	L	GF	GA	GD	W	D	L	GF	GA	GD
42	8	14	20	46	64	−18	38	6	8	7	23	22	+1	2	6	13	23	42	−19

Source: Worldfootball

==== Results by round ====
Round	1	2	3	4	5	6	7	8	9	10	11	12	13	14	15	16	17	18	19	20	21	22	23	24	25	26	27	28	29	30	31	32	33	34	35	36	37	38	39	40	41	42
Ground	H	A	A	H	A	H	A	H	A	H	A	H	A	H	A	H	H	A	H	A	H	A	H	H	A	H	A	H	A	H	A	H	A	H	A	H	A	A	H	H	A	H
Result	L	D	D	W	D	W	L	L	L	D	W	W	L	L	L	D	D	L	D	L	L	L	D	L	W	D	D	D	L	W	L	W	D	L	L	D	D	L	W	L	L	L
Position	16	16	15	10	13	9	15	15	17	17	12	10	13	13	15	16	17	17	17	19	21	21	22	22	22	22	22	22	22	21	21	21	21	21	21	21	22	22	22	22	22	22

Source: Worldfootball
A = Away; H = Home; W = Win; D = Draw; L = Loss

==== Matches ====
22 August 2010 1	Frosinone	2–3	Empoli	Frosinone
				Stadium: Stadio Matusa

28 August 2010 2	Piacenza	1–1	Frosinone	Piacenza
				Stadium: Stadio Leonardo Garilli

5 September 2010 3	Atalanta	0–0	Frosinone	Bergamo

11 September 2010 4	Frosinone	1–0	Portogruaro	Frosinone
				Stadium: Stadio Matusa

18 September 2010 5	Cittadella	1–1	Frosinone	Cittadella
				Stadium: Stadio Pier Cesare Tombolato

25 September 2010 6	Frosinone	1–0	Varese	Frosinone
				Stadium: Stadio Matusa

2 October 2010 7	Grosseto	2–0	Frosinone	Grosseto
				Stadium: Stadio Olimpico Carlo Zecchini

10 October 2010 8	Frosinone	1–2	Reggina	Frosinone
				Stadium: Stadio Matusa

13 October 2010 9	AlbinoLeffe	2–1	Frosinone	Bergamo
	Martínez 39'; Torri 42'		Terranova 84'	Stadium: Stadio Atleti Azzurri d'Italia; Referee: Emiliano Gallione

16 October 2010 10	Frosinone	1–1	Modena	Frosinone
				Stadium: Stadio Matusa

23 October 2010 11	Torino	1–2	Frosinone	Turin
				Stadium: Stadio Olimpico Grande Torino; Referee: Massimiliano Velotto

30 October 2010 12	Frosinone	1–0	Triestina	Frosinone
				Stadium: Stadio Matusa

6 November 2010 13	Siena	3–0	Frosinone	Siena
				Stadium: Stadio Artemio Franchi; Referee: Daniele Doveri

9 November 2010 14	Frosinone	2–3	Crotone	Frosinone
				Stadium: Stadio Matusa; Referee: Riccardo Pinzani

13 November 2010 15	Padova	3–1	Frosinone	Padua
				Stadium: Stadio Euganeo; Referee: Angelo Cervellera

27 November 2010 17	Frosinone	1–1	Ascoli	Frosinone
				Stadium: Stadio Matusa

30 November 2010 16	Frosinone	1–1	Pescara	Frosinone
				Stadium: Stadio Matusa

5 December 2010 18	Vicenza	1–0	Frosinone	Vicenza
				Stadium: Stadio Romeo Menti

11 December 2010 19	Frosinone	1–1	Novara	Frosinone
				Stadium: Stadio Matusa

18 December 2010 20	Sassuolo	5–3	Frosinone	Modena
	Martinetti 17', 24', 40', 75'; Noselli 69'		Stellone 23'; Sansone 74'; Santoruvo 90'	Stadium: Stadio Alberto Braglia; Referee: Emilio Ostinelli

7 January 2011 21	Frosinone	0–2	Livorno	Frosinone
				Stadium: Stadio Matusa

15 January 2011 22	Empoli	2–1	Frosinone	Empoli
				Stadium: Stadio Carlo Castellani

22 January 2011 23	Frosinone	1–1	Piacenza	Frosinone
				Stadium: Stadio Matusa

31 January 2011 24	Frosinone	0–1	Atalanta	Frosinone
			Tiribocchi 75'	Stadium: Stadio Matusa

5 February 2011 25	Portogruaro	0–1	Frosinone	Portogruaro
				Stadium: Stadio Piergiovanni Mecchia

12 February 2011 26	Frosinone	1–1	Cittadella	Frosinone
				Stadium: Stadio Matusa

21 February 2011 27	Varese	3–3	Frosinone	Varese
				Stadium: Stadio Franco Ossola

26 February 2011 28	Frosinone	0–0	Grosseto	Frosinone
				Stadium: Stadio Matusa

1 March 2011 29	Reggina	2–1	Frosinone	Reggio Calabria
				Stadium: Stadio Oreste Granillo

5 March 2011 30	Frosinone	2–1	AlbinoLeffe	Frosinone
				Stadium: Stadio Matusa

12 March 2011 31	Modena	2–1	Frosinone	Modena
				Stadium: Stadio Alberto Braglia

19 March 2011 32	Frosinone	1–0	Torino	Frosinone
				Stadium: Stadio Matusa

27 March 2011 33	Triestina	2–2	Frosinone	Trieste
				Stadium: Stadio Nereo Rocco

4 April 2011 34	Frosinone	0–1	Siena	Frosinone
				Stadium: Stadio Matusa

9 April 2011 35	Crotone	4–1	Frosinone	Crotone
				Stadium: Stadio Ezio Scida

16 April 2011 36	Frosinone	1–1	Padova	Frosinone
				Stadium: Stadio Matusa

21 April 2011 37	Pescara	1–1	Frosinone	Pescara
				Stadium: Stadio Adriatico

30 April 2011 38	Ascoli	3–1	Frosinone	Ascoli Piceno
				Stadium: Stadio Cino e Lillo Del Duca

7 May 2011 39	Frosinone	4–0	Vicenza	Frosinone
				Stadium: Stadio Matusa

14 May 2011 40	Novara	2–1	Frosinone	Novara
	Lisuzzo 33'; Bertani 50'		Sansone 13'	Stadium: Stadio Silvio Piola

21 May 2011 41	Frosinone	1–2	Sassuolo	Frosinone
	Cesaretti 40'		Quadrini 12' (pen.); Magnanelli 51'	Stadium: Stadio Matusa; Referee: Dino Tommasi

29 May 2011 42	Livorno	2–1	Frosinone	Livorno
	Danilevičius 61' (pen.); Cellerino 69'		Di Tacchio 87'	Stadium: Stadio Armando Picchi; Referee: Roberto Bagalini

=== Coppa Italia ===
16 August 2020 Second round	Frosinone	3–1	Trapani	Frosinone
				Stadium: Stadio Matusa

27 October 2020 Second round	Frosinone	2–4 (a.e.t.)	Reggina	Frosinone
				Stadium: Stadio Matusa
