= 2021–22 Empoli FC season =

Empoli
2021–22 season
- Chairman: Fabrizio Corsi
- Head coach: Aurelio Andreazzoli
- Stadium: Stadio Carlo Castellani
- Serie A: 14th
- Coppa Italia: Round of 16
- Top goalscorer: League: Andrea Pinamonti (13); All: Andrea Pinamonti (13)
Home colours	Away colours	Third colours

The 2021–22 season was the 102nd season in the existence of Empoli F.C. and the club's first season back in the top flight of Italian football. In addition to the domestic league, Empoli participated in this season's edition of the Coppa Italia.

== Players ==
=== First-team squad ===
As of 30 January 2022

Note: Flags indicate national team as defined under FIFA eligibility rules; some limited exceptions apply. Players may hold more than one non-FIFA nationality.

No.	Pos.	Nation	Player
1	GK	KOS	Samir Ujkani
3	DF	ITA	Riccardo Marchizza (on loan from Sassuolo)
5	MF	SLO	Leo Štulac (4th captain)
6	DF	ITA	Simone Romagnoli (captain)
7	MF	ITA	Valerio Verre (on loan from Sampdoria)
8	MF	SCO	Liam Henderson
9	FW	ITA	Patrick Cutrone (on loan from Wolverhampton Wanderers)
10	MF	ALB	Nedim Bajrami
11	MF	ITA	Federico Di Francesco (on loan from SPAL)
13	GK	ITA	Guglielmo Vicario (on loan from Cagliari)
15	MF	ITA	Marco Benassi (on loan from Fiorentina)
16	MF	ITA	Jacopo Fazzini
17	FW	SWE	Emmanuel Ekong
19	FW	ITA	Andrea La Mantia
20	DF	ITA	Riccardo Fiamozzi

No.	Pos.	Nation	Player
21	DF	NZL	Liberato Cacace (on loan from Sint-Truiden)
22	GK	ITA	Jacopo Furlan
23	MF	ALB	Kristjan Asllani
25	MF	ITA	Filippo Bandinelli (3rd captain)
26	DF	ITA	Lorenzo Tonelli
27	MF	POL	Szymon Żurkowski (on loan from Fiorentina)
30	DF	SLO	Petar Stojanović (on loan from Dinamo Zagreb)
32	MF	SUI	Nicolas Haas
33	DF	ITA	Sebastiano Luperto (on loan from Napoli)
34	DF	ALB	Ardian Ismajli
42	DF	ITA	Mattia Viti
65	DF	ITA	Fabiano Parisi
99	FW	ITA	Andrea Pinamonti (on loan from Inter Milan)
—	MF	POL	Iwo Kaczmarski (on loan from Raków Częstochowa)

=== Out on loan ===
As of 31 January 2022

Note: Flags indicate national team as defined under FIFA eligibility rules; some limited exceptions apply. Players may hold more than one non-FIFA nationality.

No.	Pos.	Nation	Player
—	GK	ITA	Niccolò Chiorra (at Taranto until 30 June 2022)
—	GK	ITA	Gabriel Meli (at Sudtirol until 30 June 2022)
—	GK	ITA	Leandro Pratelli (at Piacenza until 30 June 2022)
—	GK	ITA	Alex Sposito (at Pontedera until 30 June 2022)
—	GK	ITA	Niccolò Vivoli (at Pianese until 30 June 2022)
—	DF	ITA	Andrea Adamoli (at Pro Sesto until 30 June 2022)
—	DF	ITA	Simone Canestrelli (at Crotone until 30 June 2022)
—	DF	ITA	Francesco Donati (at Juve Stabia until 30 June 2022)
—	DF	ITA	Matteo Martini (at Pontedera until 30 June 2022)
—	DF	ITA	Emmanuele Matteucci (at Pontedera until 30 June 2022)

No.	Pos.	Nation	Player
—	DF	ITA	Davide Zappella (at Pescara until 30 June 2022)
—	MF	ITA	Giovanni Crociata (at SPAL until 30 June 2022)
—	MF	ITA	Samuele Ricci (at Torino until 30 June 2022)
—	MF	ITA	Samuele Damiani (at Palermo until 30 June 2022)
—	MF	ITA	Tommaso Fantacci (at Gubbio until 30 June 2022)
—	MF	ITA	Giuseppe Montaperto (at Teramo until 30 June 2022)
—	FW	ITA	Leonardo Mancuso (at Monza until 30 June 2023)
—	FW	ITA	Davide Merola (at Foggia until 30 June 2022)
—	FW	ITA	Stefano Moreo (at Brescia until 30 June 2022)
—	FW	ITA	Kevin Piscopo (at Renate until 30 June 2022)

== Transfers ==
=== Out ===
No.	Pos.	Player	Transferred to	Fee	Date	Source
31	DF	(Italy) Roberto Pirrello	(Italy) Cosenza	Loan	31 August 2021	

== Pre-season and friendlies ==
Win Draw Loss Fixtures

28 July 2021 Friendly	Empoli (Italy)	3–0	(Italy) Pontedera	Empoli, Italy
18:00 CEST (UTC+2)	Mancuso 10'; Mráz 22'; Belardinelli 57'	Report		Stadium: Stadio Carlo Castellani
Note: The match was played in two halves 30 minutes each.

31 July 2021 Friendly	Empoli (Italy)	9–0	(Italy) ADV Montecatini	Empoli, Italy
17:00 CEST (UTC+2)	Mancuso 22', 45'; Bandinelli 34'; Damiani 43'; Mráz 55'; Belardinelli 59'; Piscopo 62', 86'; Asllani 90'	Report		Stadium: Stadio Carlo Castellani; Referee: Manuel Volpi

31 July 2021 Friendly	Empoli (Italy)	Cancelled	(Italy) Montevarchi Aquila	Empoli, Italy
18:00 CEST (UTC+2)				Stadium: Stadio Carlo Castellani

7 August 2021 Friendly	Udinese (Italy)	1–0	(Italy) Empoli	Abano Terme, Italy
18:00 CEST (UTC+2)	Viti 43' (o.g.)	Report		Stadium: Stadio di Monteortone; Referee: Giovanni Ayroldi

4 September 2021 Friendly	Real Forte Querceta (Italy)	2–8	(Italy) Empoli	Forte dei Marmi, Italy
16:00 CEST (UTC+2)	Islamaj 25'; Boselli 87'	Report	La Mantia 3' (pen.); Pinamonti 55', 58'; Cutrone 67', 85'; Ekong 69'; Parisi 77'; Ignacchiti 84'	Stadium: Stadio Comunale Carlo Necchi

13 November 2021 Friendly	Empoli (Italy)	1–1	(Italy) Perugia	Empoli, Italy
15:00 CET (UTC+1)	Cutrone 70'	Report	Murano 88'	Stadium: Stadio Carlo Castellani; Referee: Adrian Lupinski

17 May 2022 Global Tour for Peace	Empoli (Italy)	1–3	Ukraine	Empoli, Italy
20:30 CEST (UTC+2)	La Mantia 45'	Report	Yaremchuk 26'; Karavayev 46'; Pikhalyonok 53'	Stadium: Stadio Carlo Castellani; Referee: Manuel Volpi

== Competitions ==
=== Overview ===
Competition	First match	Last match	Starting round	Final position	Record							
Competition	First match	Last match	Starting round	Final position	Pld	W	D	L	GF	GA	GD	Win %
Serie A	21 August 2021	21 May 2022	Matchday 1	14th	38	10	11	17	50	70	−20	26.32
Coppa Italia	15 August 2021	19 January 2022	First round	Round of 16	3	2	0	1	12	10	+2	66.67
Total					41	12	11	18	62	80	−18	29.27

Source: Soccerway

=== Serie A ===
==== League table ====
Pos	Team	Pld	W	D	L	GF	GA	GD	Pts
12	Udinese	38	11	14	13	61	58	+3	47
13	Bologna	38	12	10	16	44	55	−11	46
14	Empoli	38	10	11	17	50	70	−20	41
15	Sampdoria	38	10	6	22	46	63	−17	36
16	Spezia	38	10	6	22	41	71	−30	36

Source: Serie A
Rules for classification: 1) Points; 2) Head-to-head points; 3) Head-to-head goal difference; 4) Goal difference; 5) Goals scored; 6) Draw. (Note: Head-to-head record is used only after all the matches between the teams in question have been played)

==== Results summary ====
Overall								Home						Away					
Pld	W	D	L	GF	GA	GD	Pts	W	D	L	GF	GA	GD	W	D	L	GF	GA	GD
38	10	11	17	50	70	−20	41	4	5	10	28	44	−16	6	6	7	22	26	−4

Source: Serie A

==== Results by round ====
Round	1	2	3	4	5	6	7	8	9	10	11	12	13	14	15	16	17	18	19	20	21	22	23	24	25	26	27	28	29	30	31	32	33	34	35	36	37	38
Ground	H	A	H	H	A	H	A	H	A	H	A	H	A	H	A	H	A	A	H	A	H	A	H	A	H	A	H	A	A	H	A	H	A	H	H	A	H	A
Result	L	W	L	L	W	W	L	L	W	L	W	D	L	W	D	W	W	D	L	D	L	D	L	D	D	L	L	D	L	D	L	D	L	W	L	L	D	W
Position	17	11	12	16	11	8	10	11	10	11	11	11	12	11	11	11	8	9	9	9	11	11	12	11	11	13	13	13	13	13	14	14	14	14	14	14	14	14

Source: Serie A
A = Away; H = Home; W = Win; D = Draw; L = Loss

==== Matches ====
The league fixtures were announced on 14 July 2021.

21 August 2021 1	Empoli	1–3	Lazio	Empoli
20:45 CEST (UTC+2)	Bandinelli 4'; Stojanović (yellow card) 38'; Ismajli (yellow card) 89'	Report	Milinković-Savić 6'; Lucas (yellow card) 29'; Lazzari 31'; Immobile 41' (pen.)	Stadium: Stadio Carlo Castellani; Attendance: 3,655; Referee: Simone Sozza

28 August 2021 2	Juventus	0–1	Empoli	Turin
20:45 CEST (UTC+2)	Bernardeschi (yellow card) 81'; Danilo (yellow card) 89'	Report	Mancuso 21'; Stojanović (yellow card) 32'; Cutrone (yellow card) 44'; Ismajli (yellow card) 56'	Stadium: Juventus Stadium; Attendance: 17,584; Referee: Davide Ghersini

11 September 2021 3	Empoli	1–2	Venezia	Empoli
15:00 CEST (UTC+2)	Ismajli (yellow card) 7'; Haas (yellow card) 44'; Bajrami 89' (pen.)	Report	Henry 13'; Aramu (yellow card) 15'; Lezzerini (yellow card) 35'; Johnsen (yellow card) 45+3'; Okereke 68'; Heymans (yellow card) 86'; Mäenpää (yellow card) 88'	Stadium: Stadio Carlo Castellani; Attendance: 2,511; Referee: Antonio Rapuano

19 September 2021 4	Empoli	0–3	Sampdoria	Empoli
12:30 CEST (UTC+2)	Żurkowski (yellow card) 59'; Luperto (yellow card) 90+4'	Report	Caputo 31', 52'; Candreva 70'; Askildsen (yellow card) 73'; Torregrossa (yellow card) 88'	Stadium: Stadio Carlo Castellani; Attendance: 3,064; Referee: Maurizio Mariani

22 September 2021 5	Cagliari	0–2	Empoli	Cagliari
20:45 CEST (UTC+2)	Godín (yellow card) 75'; Nández (yellow card) 90+4'	Report	Żurkowski (yellow card) 21'; Di Francesco 29'; Štulac 69'	Stadium: Sardegna Arena; Attendance: 7,226; Referee: Marco Di Bello

26 September 2021 6	Empoli	4–2	Bologna	Empoli
15:00 CEST (UTC+2)	Bonifazi 1' (o.g.); Pinamonti 32', (yellow card) 67'; Henderson (yellow card) 34'; Bajrami 53' (pen.); Ricci 90'	Report	Barrow 11'; Arnautović (penalty missed) 20', 77'; Vignato (yellow card) 24'; Orsolini (yellow card) 90+3'	Stadium: Stadio Carlo Castellani; Attendance: 5,022; Referee: Piero Giacomelli

3 October 2021 7	Roma	2–0	Empoli	Rome
18:00 CEST (UTC+2)	Pellegrini 42'; Mkhitaryan 48'; Mancini (yellow card) 57'; Zaniolo (yellow card) 85'	Report	Ricci (yellow card) 46'; Haas (yellow card) 56'; Stojanović (yellow card) 90+1'	Stadium: Stadio Olimpico; Attendance: 31,946; Referee: Giovanni Ayroldi

17 October 2021 8	Empoli	1–4	Atalanta	Empoli
15:00 CEST (UTC+2)	Di Francesco 30'; Marchizza (yellow card) 37'; Štulac (yellow card) 46'; Bandinelli (yellow card) 67'	Report	Iličić 11', 26', (penalty missed) 67'; Viti 49' (o.g.); Freuler (yellow card) 69'; Palomino (yellow card) 80'; Zapata 89'	Stadium: Stadio Carlo Castellani; Attendance: 6,214; Referee: Marco Serra

23 October 2021 9	Salernitana	2–4	Empoli	Salerno
15:00 CEST (UTC+2)	Ranieri 48', (yellow card) 76'; Ismajli 55' (o.g.)	Report	Pinamonti 2', 45' (pen.); Cutrone 11'; Strandberg 13' (o.g.); Stojanović (yellow card) 33'; Haas (yellow card) 53'; Marchizza (yellow card) 86'	Stadium: Stadio Arechi; Attendance: 11,142; Referee: Daniele Doveri

27 October 2021 10	Empoli	0–2	Internazionale	Empoli
20:45 CEST (UTC+2)	Luperto (yellow card) 29'; Ricci (red card) 52'	Report	De Vrij (yellow card) 24'; D'Ambrosio 34'; Brozović (yellow card) 59'; Dimarco 66'; Gagliardini (yellow card) 75'	Stadium: Stadio Carlo Castellani; Attendance: 9,335; Referee: Daniele Chiffi

31 October 2021 11	Sassuolo	1–2	Empoli	Reggio Emilia
15:00 CET (UTC+1)	Scamacca (yellow card) 40'; Tonelli 43' (o.g.); Raspadori (yellow card) 66'; Defrel (yellow card) 87'; Lopez (yellow card) 90'	Report	Stojanović (yellow card) 62'; Pinamonti 83' (pen.), (yellow card) 84'; Żurkowski 90+1'	Stadium: Mapei Stadium – Città del Tricolore; Attendance: 3,539; Referee: Luca Massimi

5 November 2021 12	Empoli	2–2	Genoa	Empoli
20:45 CET (UTC+1)	Di Francesco 62'; Żurkowski 72'	Report	Criscito 13' (pen.); Rovella (yellow card) 27'; Sturaro (yellow card) 64'; Masiello (yellow card) 74'; Vásquez (yellow card) 83'; Bianchi 89'	Stadium: Stadio Carlo Castellani; Attendance: 5,631; Referee: Luca Pairetto

22 November 2021 13	Hellas Verona	2–1	Empoli	Verona
18:30 CET (UTC+1)	Simeone (yellow card) 30'; Barák 49'; Tameze 90+1'	Report	Luperto (yellow card) 43'; Romagnoli 67'; Di Francesco (yellow card) 70'; Bandinelli (yellow card) 81'	Stadium: Stadio Marcantonio Bentegodi; Attendance: 13,797; Referee: Matteo Gariglio

27 November 2021 14	Empoli	2–1	Fiorentina	Empoli
15:00 CET (UTC+1)	Tonelli (yellow card) 65'; Bandinelli 87'; Pinamonti 89'	Report	Torreira (yellow card) 52'; Vlahović 57'	Stadium: Stadio Carlo Castellani; Attendance: 7,878; Referee: Juan Luca Sacchi

2 December 2021 15	Torino	2–2	Empoli	Turin
18:30 CET (UTC+1)	Pobega 10'; Pjaca 15'; Singo (red card) 32'; Aina (yellow card) 50'	Report	Romagnoli 34'; Bandinelli (yellow card) 45+1'; Marchizza (yellow card) 57'; La Mantia 72'; Luperto (yellow card) 90+4'	Stadium: Stadio Olimpico Grande Torino; Attendance: 7,002; Referee: Andrea Colombo

6 December 2021 16	Empoli	3–1	Udinese	Empoli
18:30 CET (UTC+1)	Parisi (yellow card) 9'; Żurkowski (yellow card) 47'; Stojanović 50'; Bajrami 59'; Romagnoli (yellow card) 67'; Pinamonti 78'; Tonelli (yellow card) 90+1'	Report	Deulofeu 22'; Samir (yellow card) 30'; Soppy (yellow card) 41'; Nestorovski (yellow card) 85'	Stadium: Stadio Carlo Castellani; Attendance: 4,808; Referee: Daniele Paterna

12 December 2021 17	Napoli	0–1	Empoli	Naples
18:00 CET (UTC+1)		Report	Żurkowski (yellow card) 60'; Cutrone 70'	Stadium: Stadio Diego Armando Maradona; Attendance: 24,000; Referee: Livio Marinelli

19 December 2021 18	Spezia	1–1	Empoli	La Spezia
15:00 CET (UTC+1)	Maggiore (yellow card) 21'; Marchizza 50' (o.g.); Amian (yellow card) 88'; Kovalenko (yellow card) 90'	Report	Tonelli (yellow card) 38'; Bandinelli (yellow card) 60'; Nikolaou 71' (o.g.)	Stadium: Stadio Alberto Picco; Attendance: 5,414; Referee: Lorenzo Maggioni

22 December 2021 19	Empoli	2–4	Milan	Empoli
20:45 CET (UTC+1)	Bajrami 18'; Romagnoli (yellow card) 62'; Pinamonti 84' (pen.)	Report	Kessié 12', 42'; Tonali (yellow card) 39'; Florenzi 63'; Hernandez 69'; Bennacer (yellow card) 80'	Stadium: Stadio Carlo Castellani; Attendance: 10,596; Referee: Marco Di Bello

6 January 2022 20	Lazio	3–3	Empoli	Rome
14:30 CET (UTC+1)	Immobile 14', (penalty missed) 87'; Luiz Felipe (yellow card) 18'; Pedro (yellow card) 52'; Marušić (yellow card) 62'; Milinković-Savić 66', 90+3'; Luis Alberto (yellow card) 71'	Report	Bajrami 6' (pen.); Żurkowski 8'; Parisi (yellow card) 10'; Marchizza (yellow card) 33'; Di Francesco 75'; Luperto (yellow card) 86'; Bandinelli (yellow card) 90+5'	Stadium: Stadio Olimpico; Attendance: 23,000; Referee: Antonio Giua

9 January 2022 21	Empoli	1–5	Sassuolo	Empoli
12:30 CET (UTC+1)	Henderson 16'; Viti (yellow card) 59' (yellow-red card) 61'	Report	Berardi 13' (pen.), (yellow card) 49'; Raspadori 24', 71'; Scamacca 67', 90+2'; Kyriakopoulos (yellow card) 69'; Lopez (yellow card) 79'	Stadium: Stadio Carlo Castellani; Attendance: 4,081; Referee: Manuel Volpi

16 January 2022 22	Venezia	1–1	Empoli	Ferrara
15:00 CET (UTC+1)	Cuisance (yellow card) 10'; Okereke (yellow card) 45+2', (goal) 73'; Črnigoj (yellow card) 58'	Report	Bajrami (yellow card) 9'; Żurkowski 26'; Henderson (yellow card) 45'; Ismajli (yellow card) 59'; Fiamozzi (yellow card) 63'; Bandinelli (yellow card) 76'	Stadium: Stadio Paolo Mazza; Attendance: 3,805; Referee: Piero Giacomelli

23 January 2022 23	Empoli	2–4	Roma	Empoli
18:00 CET (UTC+1)	Pinamonti 55'; Tonelli (yellow card) 64'; Bajrami 72'; Benassi (yellow card) 83'	Report	Abraham 24', 33'; Oliveira 35'; Zaniolo 37'; Mancini (yellow card) 52'; Cristante (yellow card) 85'	Stadium: Stadio Carlo Castellani; Attendance: 4,920; Referee: Michael Fabbri

6 February 2022 24	Bologna	0–0	Empoli	Bologna
15:00 CET (UTC+1)	Schouten (yellow card) 23'; De Silvestri (yellow card) 40'	Report	Asllani (yellow card) 31'; Bandinelli (yellow card) 40'; Parisi (yellow card) 59'; Cacace (yellow card) 90'	Stadium: Stadio Renato Dall'Ara; Attendance: 5,000; Referee: Francesco Cosso

13 February 2022 25	Empoli	1–1	Cagliari	Empoli
15:00 CET (UTC+1)	Stojanović (yellow card) 1'; Pinamonti 38'	Report	João Pedro (yellow card) 40'; Marin (yellow card) 71'; Pavoletti 84'	Stadium: Stadio Carlo Castellani; Attendance: 4,787; Referee: Federico Dionisi

19 February 2022 26	Sampdoria	2–0	Empoli	Genoa
15:00 CET (UTC+1)	Quagliarella 14', 29'; Bereszyński (yellow card) 42'; Ekdal (yellow card) 45'; Candreva (yellow card) 65'; Conti (yellow card) 74'	Report	Bajrami (yellow card) 31'; Asllani (yellow card) 43'	Stadium: Stadio Luigi Ferraris; Attendance: 9,069; Referee: Antonio Rapuano

26 February 2022 27	Empoli	2–3	Juventus	Empoli
18:05 CET (UTC+1)	Żurkowski 40'; Ismajli (yellow card) 51'; Parisi (yellow card) 73'; La Mantia 76'	Report	Kean 32'; Vlahović 45+2', 66'	Stadium: Stadio Carlo Castellani; Attendance: 11,890; Referee: Fabio Maresca

6 March 2022 28	Genoa	0–0	Empoli	Genoa
12:30 CET (UTC+1)	Sturaro (yellow card) 41'; Yeboah (yellow card) 45+1'; Portanova (yellow card) 48'; Rovella (yellow card) 86'	Report	Verre (yellow card) 37'; Luperto (yellow card) 42'; Bandinelli (yellow card) 70'	Stadium: Stadio Luigi Ferraris; Attendance: 14,935; Referee: Gianluca Aureliano

12 March 2022 29	Milan	1–0	Empoli	Milan
20:45 CET (UTC+1)	Kalulu 19'; Tonali (yellow card) 90+4'	Report		Stadium: San Siro; Attendance: 48,801; Referee: Daniele Chiffi

20 March 2022 30	Empoli	1–1	Hellas Verona	Empoli
15:00 CET (UTC+1)	Di Francesco 26'; Asllani (yellow card) 45'; Parisi (yellow card) 75'	Report	Casale (yellow card) 35'; Simeone (penalty missed) 65', (yellow card) 67'; Cancellieri 72', (yellow card) 77'	Stadium: Stadio Carlo Castellani; Attendance: 5,445; Referee: Matteo Marcenaro

3 April 2022 31	Fiorentina	1–0	Empoli	Florence
12:30 CEST (UTC+2)	Torreira (yellow card) 56'; González 58'	Report	Luperto (yellow card) 45+3' (yellow-red card) 57'; Ismajli (yellow card) 81'	Stadium: Stadio Artemio Franchi; Attendance: 22,407; Referee: Luca Massimi

9 April 2022 32	Empoli	0–0	Spezia	Empoli
15:00 CEST (UTC+2)	Di Francesco (yellow card) 11'; Żurkowski (yellow card) 20'	Report	Gyasi (yellow card) 27'; Amian (yellow card) 29'	Stadium: Stadio Carlo Castellani; Attendance: 5,265; Referee: Giovanni Ayroldi

16 April 2022 33	Udinese	4–1	Empoli	Udine
14:30 CEST (UTC+2)	Ismajli 6' (o.g.); Deulofeu 52'; Molina (yellow card) 63'; Pussetto 79'; Samardžić 87'	Report	Ismajli (yellow card) 44'; Stojanović (yellow card) 61'; Bandinelli (yellow card) 63'; Pinamonti 70' (pen.); Verre (yellow card) 85'	Stadium: Stadio Friuli; Attendance: 15,226; Referee: Matteo Marchetti

24 April 2022 34	Empoli	3–2	Napoli	Empoli
15:00 CEST (UTC+2)	Bandinelli (yellow card) 4'; Viti (yellow card) 72'; Henderson 80'; Stojanović (yellow card) 81'; Pinamonti 83', 88', (yellow card) 89'	Report	Zanoli (yellow card) 22'; Mertens 44'; Insigne 53'	Stadium: Stadio Carlo Castellani; Attendance: 10,245; Referee: Livio Marinelli

1 May 2022 35	Empoli	1–3	Torino	Empoli
15:00 CEST (UTC+2)	Pinamonti (yellow card) 18'; Henderson (yellow card) 51'; Żurkowski 56'; Verre (red card) 59'; Stojanović (yellow card) 75' (yellow-red card) 86'; Luperto (yellow card) 85'	Report	Vojvoda (yellow card) 18'; Lukić (yellow card) 29'; Belotti 78' (pen.), 87' (pen.), 90+6'	Stadium: Stadio Carlo Castellani; Attendance: 8,416; Referee: Francesco Cosso

6 May 2022 36	Internazionale	4–2	Empoli	Milan
18:45 CEST (UTC+2)	Romagnoli 40' (o.g.); Martínez 45', 64', (yellow card) 64'; Sánchez 90+4'	Report	Pinamonti 5'; Asllani 28'	Stadium: San Siro; Attendance: 69,959; Referee: Gianluca Manganiello

14 May 2022 37	Empoli	1–1	Salernitana	Empoli
15:00 CEST (UTC+2)	Cutrone 31'; Henderson (yellow card) 74'; Vicario (yellow card) 76'; Bajrami (yellow card) 90+1'	Report	Radovanović (yellow card) 74'; Bonazzoli 76'; Perotti (penalty missed) 84'; Éderson (yellow card) 85'	Stadium: Stadio Carlo Castellani; Attendance: 11,650; Referee: Davide Massa

21 May 2022 38	Atalanta	0–1	Empoli	Bergamo
20:45 CEST (UTC+2)	Freuler (yellow card) 58'	Report	Stojanović (yellow card) 45'; Štulac 79'	Stadium: Gewiss Stadium; Attendance: 17,654; Referee: Rosario Abisso

=== Coppa Italia ===
15 August 2021 First round	Empoli	4–2	Vicenza	Empoli
17:45 CEST (UTC+2)	Bajrami 11'; Haas 30'; Mancuso 37'; Luperto (yellow card) 57'; Ricci (yellow card) 64'; Crociata 88'	Report	Rigoni (yellow card) 31'; Dalmonte (yellow card) 32', (goal) 39'; Lanzafame 56'; Pontisso (yellow card) 66'; Di Pardo (yellow card) 82'	Stadium: Stadio Carlo Castellani; Attendance: 0 Referee: Juan Luca Sacchi

15 December 2021 Second round	Hellas Verona	3–4	Empoli	Verona
15:00 CET (UTC+1)	Cancellieri 18'; Ilić 86'; Ragusa 88'; Šutalo (yellow card) 90+1'; Hongla (yellow card) 90+2'	Report	La Mantia 15', (red card) 90+3'; Štulac (yellow card) 38'; Romagnoli (yellow card) 45+4'; Mancuso 66' (pen.), 70'; Bajrami 74'; Cutrone (yellow card) 90+2'	Stadium: Stadio Marcantonio Bentegodi; Attendance: 1,101; Referee: Federico Dionisi

19 January 2022 Round of 16	Internazionale	3–2 (a.e.t.)	Empoli	Milan
21:00 CET (UTC+1)	Sánchez 13'; Vecino (yellow card) 54'; Ranocchia 90+1'; Sensi 104'	Report	Bajrami 61'; Radu 76' (o.g.); Romagnoli (yellow card) 77'	Stadium: San Siro; Attendance: 5,000; Referee: Juan Luca Sacchi

== Statistics ==
=== Appearances and goals ===
No.	Pos	Nat	Player	Total		Serie A		Coppa Italia	
No.	Pos	Nat	Player	Apps	Goals	Apps	Goals	Apps	Goals
Goalkeepers
1	GK	(Kosovo) KOS	Samir Ujkani	0	0	0	0	0	0
13	GK	(Italy) ITA	Guglielmo Vicario	13	0	12	0	1	0
22	GK	(Italy) ITA	Jacopo Furlan	0	0	0	0	0	0
Defenders
3	DF	(Italy) ITA	Riccardo Marchizza	12	0	11	0	1	0
6	DF	(Italy) ITA	Simone Romagnoli	7	0	5+1	0	1	0
20	DF	(Italy) ITA	Riccardo Fiamozzi	3	0	1+2	0	0	0
26	DF	(Italy) ITA	Lorenzo Tonelli	5	0	2+3	0	0	0
30	DF	(Slovenia) SLO	Petar Stojanovic	12	0	11	0	1	0
33	DF	(Italy) ITA	Sebastiano Luperto	7	0	5+1	0	0+1	0
34	DF	(Albania) ALB	Ardian Ismajli	9	0	6+2	0	1	0
42	DF	(Italy) ITA	Mattia Viti	6	0	6	0	0	0
65	DF	(Italy) ITA	Fabiano Parisi	4	0	1+3	0	0	0
Midfielders
5	MF	(Slovenia) SLO	Leo Stulac	10	1	3+6	1	1	0
8	MF	(Scotland) SCO	Liam Henderson	12	0	8+4	0	0	0
10	MF	(Albania) ALB	Nedim Bajrami	11	3	6+4	2	1	1
23	MF	(Albania) ALB	Kristjan Asllani	5	0	0+4	0	0+1	0
25	MF	(Italy) ITA	Filippo Bandinelli	12	1	8+3	1	1	0
27	MF	(Poland) POL	Szymon Żurkowski	12	2	5+6	2	0+1	0
28	MF	(Italy) ITA	Samuele Ricci	11	1	9+1	1	1	0
32	MF	(Switzerland) SUI	Nicolas Haas	12	1	9+2	0	1	1
Forwards
7	FW	(Italy) ITA	Leonardo Mancuso	7	2	4+2	1	1	1
9	FW	(Italy) ITA	Patrick Cutrone	12	1	6+5	1	0+1	0
11	FW	(Italy) ITA	Federico Di Francesco	8	3	6+2	3	0	0
17	FW	(Italy) ITA	Andrea La Mantia	4	0	0+4	0	0	0
99	FW	(Italy) ITA	Andrea Pinamonti	11	4	8+3	4	0	0
Players transferred out during the season
14	MF	(Italy) ITA	Giovanni Crociata	2	1	0+1	0	0+1	1

Last updated: 5 November 2021
Source: Competitions
