= 2020–21 Empoli FC season =

Empoli F.C.
2020–21 season
- Chairman: Fabrizio Corsi
- Head coach: Alessio Dionisi
- Stadium: Stadio Carlo Castellani
- Serie B: 1st (promoted)
- Coppa Italia: Round of 16
- Top goalscorer: League: Leonardo Mancuso (20); All: Leonardo Mancuso (23)
Home colours	Away colours

The 2020–21 Empoli Football Club season was the club's 100th season in existence and the club's second consecutive season in the second division of Italian football. In addition to the domestic league, Empoli participated in this season's edition of the Coppa Italia. The season covered the period from 5 August 2020 to 30 June 2021.

The team achieved a remarkable feat by finishing the season unbeaten at home.

== Players ==
=== First-team squad ===
As of 27 January 2021

Note: Flags indicate national team as defined under FIFA eligibility rules; some limited exceptions apply. Players may hold more than one non-FIFA nationality.

No.	Pos.	Nation	Player
1	GK	ITA	Alberto Brignoli
3	DF	SRB	Aleksa Terzić (on loan from Fiorentina)
4	MF	ITA	Giovanni Crociata (on loan from Crotone)
5	MF	SLO	Leo Štulac
6	DF	ITA	Simone Romagnoli
7	FW	ITA	Leonardo Mancuso
8	FW	BRA	Ryder Matos (on loan from Udinese)
9	FW	ITA	Marco Olivieri (on loan from Juventus)
10	FW	ITA	Stefano Moreo
11	MF	ALB	Nedim Bajrami
12	GK	ITA	Leandro Pratelli
16	DF	ITA	Nicolò Casale (on loan from Verona)
19	FW	ITA	Andrea La Mantia
20	DF	ITA	Riccardo Fiamozzi (on loan from Lecce)

No.	Pos.	Nation	Player
21	DF	ITA	Stefano Sabelli
22	GK	ITA	Jacopo Furlan
25	MF	ITA	Filippo Bandinelli
27	MF	POL	Szymon Żurkowski (on loan from Fiorentina)
28	MF	ITA	Samuele Ricci
30	MF	ITA	Samuele Damiani
31	DF	ITA	Roberto Pirrello
32	MF	SUI	Nicolas Haas (on loan from Atalanta)
42	DF	ITA	Mattia Viti
43	DF	GRE	Dimitris Nikolaou
47	DF	ITA	Andrea Cambiaso (on loan from Genoa)
65	DF	ITA	Fabiano Parisi
—	MF	LTU	Augustinas Klimavičius (on loan from Genoa)

=== Players out on loan ===
Note: Flags indicate national team as defined under FIFA eligibility rules; some limited exceptions apply. Players may hold more than one non-FIFA nationality.

No.	Pos.	Nation	Player
—	GK	ITA	Gabriel Meli (at Fano until 30 June 2021)
—	GK	ITA	Niccolò Vivoli (at Pistoiese until 30 June 2021)
—	DF	ITA	Andrea Adamoli (at Lucchese until 30 June 2021)
—	DF	ITA	Marco Imperiale (at Carrarese until 30 June 2021)
—	DF	ITA	Emanuele Matteucci (at Pontedera until 30 June 2021)
—	DF	ITA	Davide Zappella (at Cesena until 30 June 2021)
—	MF	ITA	Tommaso Fantacci (at Juve Stabia until 30 June 2021)
—	MF	ITA	Giuseppe Montaperto (at Cavese until 30 June 2021)

No.	Pos.	Nation	Player
—	MF	SEN	Mouhamadou Sakho (at Arezzo until 30 June 2021)
—	MF	CIV	Hamed Junior Traorè (at Sassuolo until 30 June 2021)
—	FW	ITA	Kevin Cannavò (at Vis Pesaro until 30 June 2021)
—	FW	ITA	Antonino La Gumina (at Sampdoria until 30 June 2021, obligation to buy)
—	FW	ITA	Davide Merola (at Grosseto until 30 June 2021)
—	FW	SVK	Samuel Mráz (at Zagłębie Lubin until 30 June 2021)
—	FW	ITA	Kevin Piscopo (at Carrarese until 30 June 2021)

== Transfers ==
=== In ===
Date	Name	Moving from	Moving to	Fee
1 September 2020	(Poland) Szymon Żurkowski	Fiorentina	Empoli	Loan
1 September 2020	(Serbia) Aleksa Terzić	Fiorentina	Empoli	Loan
9 September 2020	Marco Olivieri	Juventus	Empoli	Loan
17 September 2020	(Croatia) Marko Brkic	(Croatia) Dinamo Zagreb	Empoli	Loan
18 September 2020	Mirco Lipari	Juventus	Empoli	Loan
18 September 2020	Leonardo Manfredi	Atalanta	Empoli	Loan
21 September 2020	Andrea Cambiaso	Genoa	Empoli	Loan
22 September 2020	Fabiano Parisi	Avellino	Empoli	Undisclosed
25 September 2020	(Switzerland) Nicolas Haas	Atalanta	Empoli	Loan
3 October 2020	Nicolò Casale	Verona	Empoli	Loan
3 October 2020	Duccio Toccafondi	Prato	Empoli	Loan
4 October 2020	(Brazil) Ryder Matos	Udinese	Empoli	Loan
5 October 2020	Jacopo Furlan	Catania	Empoli	Undisclosed
5 October 2020	(Lithuania) Augustinas Klimavičius	Genoa	Empoli	Loan

=== Out ===
Date	Name	Moving from	Moving to	Fee
22 July 2020	(Austria) Arnel Jakupović	Empoli	(Slovenia) Domžale	Undisclosed (Note: The player already played for his new club in 2019–20 season, the deal turned from temporary to definitive.)
9 August 2020	(Poland) Michał Marcjanik	Empoli	(Poland) Arka Gdynia	Undisclosed
13 August 2020	(Slovakia) Samuel Mráz	Empoli	(Poland) Zagłębie Lubin	Loan
18 August 2020	Marco Curto	Empoli	Südtirol	Undisclosed
21 August 2020	Kevin Cannavò	Empoli	Vis Pesaro	Loan
24 August 2020	(Albania) Frédéric Veseli	Empoli	Salernitana	Undisclosed¨
29 August 2020	Marco Imperiale	Empoli	Carrarese	Loan
2 September 2020	Filippo Perucchini	Empoli	Pistoiese	Undisclosed
7 September 2020	Davide Bertolini	Empoli	Prato	Loan
7 September 2020	Gianlorenzo Lupi	Empoli	Poggibonsi	Loan
7 September 2020	Niccolò Vivoli	Empoli	Pistoiese	Loan
7 September 2020	Alex Sposito	Empoli	Taranto	Loan
23 September 2020	Giuseppe Montaperto	Empoli	Cavese	Loan
5 October 2020	Kevin Piscopo	Empoli	Carrarese	Loan
5 October 2020	Davide Merola	Empoli	Arezzo	Loan
5 October 2020	(Senegal) Mouhamadou Sakho	Empoli	Arezzo	Loan
5 October 2020	Ivan Provedel	Empoli	Spezia	Undisclosed
5 October 2020	Tommaso Fantacci	Empoli	Juve Stabia	Undisclosed

== Pre-season and friendlies ==
Win Draw Loss

2 September 2020 Friendly	Empoli (Italy)	0–1	(Italy) Pontedera	Empoli, Italy
17:30 CEST (UTC+2)				Stadium: Stadio Carlo Castellani

6 September 2020 Friendly	Parma (Italy)	0–2	(Italy) Empoli	Parma, Italy
17:30 CEST (UTC+2)			Mancuso 32', 40'	Stadium: Stadio Ennio Tardini; Attendance: 0

12 September 2020 Friendly	Empoli (Italy)	4–0	(Italy) Lucchese	Empoli, Italy
18:00 CEST (UTC+2)				Stadium: Stadio Carlo Castellani

19 September 2020 Friendly	Empoli (Italy)	2–0	(Italy) Vis Pesaro	Empoli, Italy
17:30 CEST (UTC+2)				Stadium: Stadio Carlo Castellani

== Competitions ==
=== Overview ===
Competition	First match	Last match	Starting round	Final position	Record							
Competition	First match	Last match	Starting round	Final position	Pld	W	D	L	GF	GA	GD	Win %
Serie B	26 September 2020	10 May 2021	Matchday 1	1st	38	19	16	3	68	35	+33	50.00
Coppa Italia	30 September 2020	13 January 2021	Second round	Round of 16	3	2	0	1	9	5	+4	66.67
Total					41	21	16	4	77	40	+37	51.22

Source: Soccerway

=== Serie B ===
Pos	Team	Pld	W	D	L	GF	GA	GD	Pts	Promotion, qualification or relegation
1	Empoli (C, P)	38	19	16	3	68	35	+33	73	Promotion to Serie A
2	Salernitana (P)	38	19	12	7	46	34	+12	69	Promotion to Serie A
3	Monza	38	17	13	8	51	33	+18	64	Qualification for promotion play-offs semi-finals
4	Lecce	38	16	14	8	68	47	+21	62	Qualification for promotion play-offs semi-finals
5	Venezia (O, P)	38	15	14	9	53	39	+14	59	Qualification for promotion play-offs preliminary round

Source: Lega Serie B (in Italian), Soccerway (in English)
Rules for classification: 1) Points; 2) Head-to-head points; 3) Head-to-head goal difference; 4) Goal difference; 5) Goals scored; 6) Draw.
(C) Champions; (O) Play-off winners; (P) Promoted

==== Results summary ====
Overall								Home						Away					
Pld	W	D	L	GF	GA	GD	Pts	W	D	L	GF	GA	GD	W	D	L	GF	GA	GD
38	19	16	3	68	35	+33	73	11	8	0	38	15	+23	8	8	3	30	20	+10

Source: Serie B

==== Results by round ====
Round	1	2	3	4	5	6	7	8	9	10	11	12	13	14	15	16	17	18	19	20	21	22	23	24	25	26	27	28	29	30	31	32	33	34	35	36	37	38
Ground	A	H	A	H	H	A	H	A	H	A	A	H	A	H	A	H	A	H	A	H	A	H	A	A	H	A	H	A	H	H	A	A	H	A	H	A	A	H
Result	W	D	W	W	W	L	W	D	D	D	W	W	D	D	W	D	W	W	D	W	D	D	D	D	D	W	D	W	W	W	W	D	W	W	L	W	L	W
Position	2	4	3	2	2	2	2	2	2	2	2	1	1	2	2	1	1	1	1	1	1	1	1	1	1	1	1	1	1	1	1	1	1	1	1	1	1	1

Source: Serie B
A = Away; H = Home; W = Win; D = Draw; L = Loss

==== Matches ====
The league fixtures were announced on 9 September 2020.

26 September 2020 1	Frosinone	0–2	Empoli	Frosinone
14:00 CEST (UTC+2)		Report	Moreo 4'; La Mantia 19'	Stadium: Stadio Benito Stirpe; Attendance: 0 Referee: Gianluca Manganiello

3 October 2020 2	Empoli	0–0	Monza	Empoli
16:15 CEST (UTC+2)		Report		Stadium: Stadio Carlo Castellani; Attendance: 669; Referee: Antonio Di Martino

17 October 2020 3	Pescara	1–2	Empoli	Pescara
16:00 CEST (UTC+2)		Report		Stadium: Stadio Adriatico – Giovanni Cornacchia; Attendance: 400; Referee: Alessandro Prontera

20 October 2020 4	Empoli	2–1	SPAL	Empoli
21:00 CEST (UTC+2)	Bajrami 63'; Mancuso 82'	Report	Esposito 33'	Stadium: Stadio Carlo Castellani; Attendance: 580; Referee: Fabrizio Pasqua

23 October 2020 5	Empoli	3–1	Pisa	Empoli
21:00 CEST (UTC+2)		Report		Stadium: Stadio Carlo Castellani; Attendance: 960; Referee: Fabio Maresca

31 October 2020 6	Venezia	2–0	Empoli	Venice
16:00 CET (UTC+1)		Report		Stadium: Stadio Pier Luigi Penzo; Attendance: 0 Referee: Paolo Valeri

7 November 2020 7	Empoli	3–0	Reggina	Empoli
16:00 CET (UTC+1)	Mancuso 47'; Matos 59'; Olivieri 82'			Stadium: Stadio Carlo Castellani; Referee: Gianpaolo Calvarese

21 November 2020 8	Cittadella	2–2	Empoli	Cittadella
14:00 CET (UTC+1)	Benedetti 30' (yellow card) 64'; Gargiulo 90+1'	Report	Haas (yellow card) 40'; Mancuso 69' (pen.); Olivieri 72'; Romagnoli (red card) 90+3'; Furlan (yellow card) 90+6'	Stadium: Stadio Pier Cesare Tombolato; Attendance: 0 Referee: Valerio Marini

28 November 2020 9	Empoli	2–2	Vicenza	Empoli
14:00 CET (UTC+1)	Ryder Matos 56'; Fiamozzi (yellow card) 80' (yellow-red card) 90+2'; La Mantia 88'; Bandinelli (yellow card) 90+2'	Report	Meggiorini 15'; Barlocco (yellow card) 30'; Zonta (yellow card) 72'; Longo (yellow card) 87' (goal) 90+3'	Stadium: Stadio Carlo Castellani; Attendance: 0 Referee: Marco Guida

7 December 2020 10	Pordenone	0–0	Empoli	Lignano Sabbiadoro
21:00 CET (UTC+1)	Berra (yellow card) 28'	Report	Ricci (yellow card) 36'; Haas (yellow card) 39'	Stadium: Stadio Guido Teghil; Attendance: 0 Referee: Luca Pairetto

12 December 2020 11	Virtus Entella	2–5	Empoli	Chiavari
14:00 CET (UTC+1)	Schenetti (yellow card) 28'; Coppolaro (yellow card) 45'; Costa 45+4'; Poli 75'; Petrović (yellow card) 79'	Report	Bandinelli (yellow card) 18'; Romagnoli (yellow card) 35'; Mancuso 56' 59' 60' 71'; Haas 90+5'	Stadium: Stadio Comunale; Attendance: 0 Referee: Luca Massimi

15 December 2020 12	Empoli	1–0	Cremonese	Empoli
21:00 CET (UTC+1)	Štulac 45+3'	Report	Celar (yellow card) 84'; Fiordaliso (yellow card) 90+2'	Stadium: Stadio Carlo Castellani; Attendance: 0 Referee: Daniel Amabile

19 December 2020 13	Chievo	1–1	Empoli	Verona
14:00 CET (UTC+1)	Obi 18'; Renzetti (yellow card) 22' (yellow-red card) 69'; Margiotta (yellow card) 84'	Report	La Mantia 60'	Stadium: Stadio Marcantonio Bentegodi; Attendance: 0 Referee: Livio Marinelli
Note: Played Behind Closed Doors

22 December 2020 14	Empoli	0–0	Reggiana	Empoli
21:00 CET (UTC+1)	Romagnoli (yellow card) 40' (yellow-red card) 56'	Report	Zampano (yellow card) 45'; Muratore (yellow card) 60'; Pezzella (yellow card) 89'	Stadium: Stadio Carlo Castellani; Attendance: 0 Referee: Simone Sozza
Note: Played Behind Closed Doors

27 December 2020 15	Brescia	1–3	Empoli	Brescia
18:00 CET (UTC+1)	Špalek (yellow card) 40'; Torregrossa 44' (pen.); Matějů (yellow card) 81'	Report	La Mantia (yellow card) 2' (goal) 40'; Haas 12'; Casale (yellow card) 23'; Mancuso 80' (yellow card) 83'; Ricci (yellow card) 82'	Stadium: Stadio Mario Rigamonti; Attendance: 0 Referee: Riccardo Ros
Note: Played Behind Closed Doors

30 December 2020 16	Empoli	1–1	Ascoli	Empoli
18:00 CET (UTC+1)	Štulac (yellow card) 52'; Moreo 72'	Report	Bajić 2'; Sabiri (yellow card) 41'; Marcel Büchel (yellow card) 66'; Eramo (yellow card) 79'; Chiricò (yellow card) 79'	Stadium: Stadio Carlo Castellani; Attendance: 0 Referee: Giacomo Campione
Note: Played Behind Closed Doors

4 January 2021 17	Cosenza	0–2	Empoli	Cosenza
15:00 CET (UTC+1)	Tirtiello (yellow card) 45'; Vera (yellow card) 52'; Sciaudone (yellow card) 77'	Report	Haas (yellow card) 22'; Olivieri 45+1' (pen.); Romagnoli (yellow card) 69'; Mancuso 88'	Stadium: Stadio San Vito-Gigi Marulla; Attendance: 0 Referee: Davide Massa
Note: Played Behind Closed Doors

17 January 2021 18	Empoli	5–0	Salernitana	Empoli
21:00 CET (UTC+1)	Ricci 19'; Štulac 28'; Mancuso 35'; Nikolaou (yellow card) 38'; Parisi 42'; Haas (yellow card) 84'; Żurkowski (yellow card) 84'; Olivieri 87'	Report	Anderson (yellow card) 10'; Dziczek (yellow card) 11'	Stadium: Stadio Carlo Castellani; Attendance: 0 Referee: Luca Pairetto
Note: Played Behind Closed Doors

24 January 2021 19	Lecce	2–2	Empoli	Lecce
15:00 CET (UTC+1)	Nikolov (yellow card) 5'; Tachtsidis (yellow card) 46'; Mancosu 79' (yellow card) 90+2'; Pablo Rodríguez 90'	Report	Haas 33' (yellow card) 66'; Parisi (yellow card) 41'; La Mantia 47'; Ryder Matos (yellow card) 90+3'	Stadium: Stadio Via del Mare; Attendance: 0 Referee: Fabrizio Pasqua
Note: COVID-19 pandemic in Italy

30 January 2021 20	Empoli	3–1	Frosinone	Empoli
14:00 CET (UTC+1)	Mancuso 34'; Żurkowski 42'; Bajrami 61'	Report	Kastanos 30'	Stadium: Stadio Carlo Castellani; Attendance: 0 Referee: Davide Ghersini
Note: COVID-19 pandemic in Italy

6 February 2021 21	Monza	1–1	Empoli	Monza
16:00 CET (UTC+1)	Boateng 70' (pen.); Dany Mota (yellow card) 79'; Bellusci (yellow card) 90+3'	Report	Mancuso 2'; Casale (yellow card) 20'; Haas (yellow card) 23'; Furlan (red card) 50'; Ricci (yellow card) 90'	Stadium: U-Power Stadium; Attendance: 0 Referee: Antonio Giua
Note: COVID-19 pandemic in Italy

9 February 2021 22	Empoli	2–2	Pescara	Empoli
19:00 CET (UTC+1)	Ryder Matos (yellow card) 23'; Ricci 62'; La Mantia 72'	Report	Ceter (yellow card) 30'; Bocchetti (yellow card) 39'; Busellato 49' (yellow card) 57'; Pepin 79' (yellow card) 80'	Stadium: Stadio Carlo Castellani; Attendance: 0 Referee: Marco Serra
Note: COVID-19 pandemic in Italy

13 February 2021 23	SPAL	1–1	Empoli	Ferrara
16:00 CET (UTC+1)	Gabriel Espeto (yellow card) 19'; Paloschi (yellow card) 43'; Salvatore Esposito 78' (pen.)	Report	Parisi (yellow card) 23'; Mancuso 27'	Stadium: Stadio Paolo Mazza; Attendance: 0 Referee: Maurizio Mariani
Note: COVID-19 pandemic in Italy

20 February 2021 24	Pisa	1–1	Empoli	Pisa
18:00 CET (UTC+1)	Birindelli 35'	Report	Żurkowski 76'	Stadium: Arena Garibaldi – Stadio Romeo Anconetani; Attendance: 0 Referee: Gianluca Manganiello
Note: COVID-19 pandemic in Italy

26 February 2021 25	Empoli	1–1	Venezia	Empoli
21:00 CET (UTC+1)	Fiamozzi (yellow card) 40'; Haas 70'	Report	Mazzochi 25' (yellow card) 26'	Stadium: Stadio Carlo Castellani; Attendance: 0 Referee: Gianluca Aureliano
Note: COVID-19 pandemic in Italy

2 March 2021 26	Reggina	0–3	Empoli	Reggio Calabria
19:00 CET (UTC+1)		Report	Olivieri 23'; Mancuso 54'; Štulac (yellow card) 57'; Brignoli (yellow card) 59'; Ryder Matos (yellow card) 86' (goal) 90'	Stadium: Stadio Oreste Granillo; Attendance: 0 Referee: Paolo Valeri
Note: COVID-19 pandemic in Italy

7 March 2021 27	Empoli	1–1	Cittadella	Empoli
15:00 CET (UTC+1)	Olivieri (yellow card) 2'; Bajrami 23'	Report	Gargiulo (yellow card) 45+1'; Proia 63'; Iori (yellow card) 80'	Stadium: Stadio Carlo Castellani; Attendance: 0 Referee: Fabio Maresca
Note: COVID-19 pandemic in Italy

13 March 2021 28	Vicenza	0–2	Empoli	Vicenza
18:00 CET (UTC+1)	Gori (yellow card) 87'; Vandeputte (yellow card) 88'; Grandi (yellow card) 90+6'	Report	Mancuso 8'; Żurkowski (yellow card) 81'; Moreo (yellow card) 86'; Ryder Matos 90+7' (pen.)	Stadium: Stadio Romeo Menti; Attendance: 0 Referee: Luca Pairetto
Note: COVID-19 pandemic in Italy

16 March 2021 29	Empoli	1–0	Pordenone	Empoli
19:00 CET (UTC+1)	Olivieri (yellow card) 27'; Mancuso (yellow card) 30'; Štulac (yellow card) 32'; Bajrami (yellow card) 71'; Chrzanowski 88' (o.g.)	Report	Falasco (yellow card) 6' (yellow-red card) 6'; Musiolik (yellow card) 86'	Stadium: Stadio Carlo Castellani; Attendance: 0 Referee: Federico La Penna
Note: COVID-19 pandemic in Italy

20 March 2021 30	Empoli	1–0	Virtus Entella	Empoli
14:00 CET (UTC+1)	Casale 37'; Ryder Matos (yellow card) 90+6'	Report	Koutsoupias (yellow card) 36'; Pavic (yellow card) 59'	Stadium: Stadio Carlo Castellani; Attendance: 0 Referee: Matteo Marchetti
Note: COVID-19 pandemic in Italy

9 April 2021 33	Reggiana	0–1	Empoli	Reggio Emilia
21:00 CET (UTC+1)	Kargbo (yellow card) 89'; Rossi (yellow card) 90+5'	Report	Ryder Matos 11'; Haas (yellow card) 51'; Żurkowski (yellow card) 87'; Sabelli (yellow card) 90+3'	Stadium: Mapei Stadium – Città del Tricolore; Attendance: 0 Referee: Davide Ghersini
Note: COVID-19 pandemic in Italy

13 April 2021 31	Cremonese	2–2	Empoli	Cremona
16:00 CET (UTC+1)	Terranova 35' (pen.) (yellow card) 90+1'; Castagnetti (yellow card) 59' (yellow-red card) 90+2'; Ciofani 79'	Report	Mancuso 8' 65'	Stadium: Stadio Giovanni Zini; Attendance: 0 Referee: Eugenio Abbattista
Note: COVID-19 pandemic in Italy

17 April 2021 34	Empoli	4–2	Brescia	Empoli
14:00 CET (UTC+1)	Joronen 10' (o.g.); Bajrami 17'; Štulac 45'; Ryder Matos 83'	Report	Bjarnason 27'; Ndoj (yellow card) 54'; Mangraviti (yellow card) 70'; Donnarumma 72'	Stadium: Stadio Carlo Castellani; Attendance: 0 Referee: Giovanni Ayroldi
Note: COVID-19 pandemic in Italy

1 May 2021 35	Ascoli	2–0	Empoli	Ascoli Piceno
14:00 CET (UTC+1)	Dionisi 39'; Bajić 60'; Brosco (yellow card) 75'; Avlonitis (yellow card) 83'; Büchel (yellow card) 88'	Report	Żurkowski (yellow card) 45+1'; Sabelli (yellow card) 58'; Moreo (yellow card) 88'	Stadium: Stadio Cino e Lillo Del Duca; Attendance: 0 Referee: Simone Sozza
Note: COVID-19 pandemic in Italy

4 May 2021 36	Empoli	4–0	Cosenza	Empoli
14:00 CET (UTC+1)	Mancuso 31' (pen.) (yellow card) 41'; La Mantia 39' 61'; Bajrami 64'; Haas (yellow card) 83'	Report	Idda (yellow card) 30'	Stadium: Stadio Carlo Castellani; Attendance: 0 Referee: Francesco Fourneau
Note: COVID-19 pandemic in Italy

7 May 2021 37	Salernitana	2–0	Empoli	Salerno
14:00 CET (UTC+1)	Coulibaly (yellow card) 13'; Bogdan 32'; Belec (yellow card) 87'; Anderson 90+3'	Report	Bajrami (yellow card) 87'	Stadium: Stadio Arechi; Attendance: 0 Referee: Michael Fabbri
Note: COVID-19 pandemic in Italy

10 May 2021 38	Empoli	2–1	Lecce	Empoli
14:00 CET (UTC+1)	Haas (yellow card) 39'; La Mantia 51'; Parisi (yellow card) 63'; Matos 69'; Olivieri (yellow card) 84'	Report	Meccariello (yellow card) 10'; Pablo Rodríguez 24'; Pisacane (yellow card) 42'	Stadium: Stadio Carlo Castellani; Attendance: 0 Referee: Gianluca Aureliano
Note: COVID-19 pandemic in Italy

=== Coppa Italia ===
28 October 2020 Third round	Benevento	2–4	Empoli	Benevento
16:00 CET (UTC+1)	Maggio 57'; Tello (yellow card) 61'; Insigne (yellow card) 61'; Improta (yellow card) 79'; Schiattarella (red card) 80'; Tuia (yellow card) 82'; Tuia (yellow card) 84'; Moncini 90+1'	Report	Olivieri 47'; Mancosu 60', 66', 85', (yellow card) 77'; Matos (yellow card) 75'; Baldanzi (yellow card) 79'; Furlan (yellow card) 90'	Stadium: Stadio Ciro Vigorito; Referee: Ivano Pezzuto

25 November 2020 Fourth round	Empoli	3–0	Brescia	Empoli
14:30 CET (UTC+1)		Report		Stadium: Stadio Carlo Castellani; Referee: Nicola Ayroldi
Note: Brescia withdrew from the match to prevent an outbreak after several of their players tested positive for COVID-19.

13 January 2021 Round of 16	Napoli	3–2	Empoli	Naples
17:45 CET (UTC+1)	Di Lorenzo 18'; Lozano 38'; Petagna 77'	Report	Bajrami 33', 68'; Olivieri (yellow card) 45+1'	Stadium: Stadio San Paolo; Referee: Antonio Giua
