= Voltolini =

Voltolini is an Italian surname. Notable people with the surname include:

- Antonio Voltolini (1643–1718), Italian painter of the Baroque style
- Dario Voltolini (Turin, 1959), Italian writer
- Matteo Voltolini (born 1996), Italian footballer
