= Modolo (surname) =

Mondolo is a surname. Notable people with the surname include:

- Marco Modolo (born 1989), Italian footballer
- Sacha Modolo (born 1987), Italian road racing cyclist
