= Mattia Viti =

Italian footballer (born 2002)

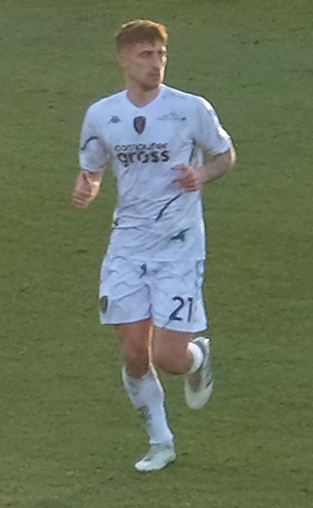
- Viti in 2025 with Empoli

Personal information
- Date of birth: 24 January 2002 (age 24)
- Place of birth: Borgo San Lorenzo, Italy
- Height: 1.90 m (6 ft 3 in)
- Positions: Centre-back; left-back

Team information
- Current team: Sampdoria
- Number: 2

Youth career
- 2006–2009: Ponte a Greve
- 2009–2010: Audace Legnaia
- 2010–2020: Empoli

Senior career*
Years	Team	Apps	(Gls)
2020–2022	Empoli	22	(0)
2022–2026	Nice	9	(1)
2023–2024	→ Sassuolo (loan)	15	(1)
2024–2025	→ Empoli (loan)	30	(1)
2025–2026	→ Fiorentina (loan)	10	(0)
2026	→ Sampdoria (loan)	16	(0)
2026–	Sampdoria	1	(0)

International career^{‡}
2017	Italy U15	2	(0)
2018	Italy U16	3	(0)
2020	Italy U18	2	(0)
2021	Italy U20	4	(0)
2022–2023	Italy U21	6	(0)
- * Club domestic league appearances and goals as of 23 August 2026 ‡ National team caps and goals as of 24 March 2023

Mattia Viti (born 24 January 2002) is an Italian professional footballer who plays as a centre-back or left-back for Serie B side Sampdoria.

== Early life ==
Born in Borgo San Lorenzo, in the province of Florence, Mattia Viti began playing football at the age of 4, with Ponte a Greve—that would later merge with Rondinella Marzocco—in the Tuscan capital. Having moved to nearby Audace Legnaia, he joined the Empoli academy as an 8-year-old in 2010.

== Club career ==
=== Empoli ===
After spending the entirety of the 2019–20 season with the Primavera side, Viti made his senior professional debut on 30 September 2020, starting a 2–1 Coppa Italia win against Renate. He played his first Serie B game with Empoli on 9 April 2021, replacing Nedim Bajrami, in a 1–0 away win against Reggiana, already proving to be decisive with a late-minute goal-line clearance. His side eventually won the championship, making their comeback in Italy's top-flight, while the Primavera squad also won their championship.

On 22 September 2021, he made his Serie A debut in a 2–0 away victory against Cagliari, with Aurelio Andreazzoli making him start and finish the game, as the youngster proved to be instrumental in keeping a clean sheet for the Azzurri.

During the following months—despite having to deal with the loss of his mother in November 2021—he became a regular with the first team, alternating with Sebastiano Luperto and veterans Tonelli and Romagnoli. He was a starter for several important Serie A wins, against the likes of Bologna, Sassuolo and Udinese, appearing as one of the Italian championship's most promising young defenders.

=== Nice ===
On 3 August 2022, Viti joined Ligue 1 side Nice on a permanent deal for an undisclosed fee, believed to be in the region of €13 million. Later that year, on 9 October, he scored his first goal in a 3–2 victory over Troyes.

==== Loan to Sassuolo ====
On 12 July 2023, Serie A side Sassuolo announced the signing of Viti on a season-long loan with a future option to buy. On 26 May 2024, he netted his first Serie A goal in a 1–1 away draw against Lazio on the final matchday of the season.

==== Return to Empoli on loan ====
On 22 July 2024, Viti returned to Empoli, signing on loan until the end of the 2024–25 season, with an option to make the deal permanent.

==== Loan to Fiorentina ====
On 1 July 2025, Viti joined Fiorentina on loan with an option to buy.

==== Loan to Sampdoria ====
On 17 January 2026, Viti moved on a new loan to Sampdoria in Serie B.

=== Sampdoria ===
On July 31, 2026, Viti joined Sampdoria on a permanent deal until 2030.

== International career ==
Viti is a youth international for Italy, having played at under-15, under-16 and under-18 levels.

In September 2021, he was selected for the under-20 side, making his debut during a 1–0 away friendly win against Serbia on 6 September, and becoming a regular starter for the team in November, before being promoted to the under-21 side, where he was forced to withdraw due to injury.

== Style of play ==
He is a left-footed centre-back who is 1.90m and 84kg.

He has been compared to former Empoli star Daniele Rugani, and his profile is often associated with that of Alessandro Bastoni. He cites Sergio Ramos and Paolo Maldini as his main inspirations as a player.

== Career statistics ==
=== Club ===
As of match played 27 December 2025

Appearances and goals by club, season and competition
Club	Season	League			National cup (Note: Includes Coppa Italia, Coupe de France)		Europe		Total	
Club	Season	Division	Apps	Goals	Apps	Goals	Apps	Goals	Apps	Goals
Empoli	2020–21	Serie B	2	0	3	0	—		5	0
Empoli	2021–22	Serie A	20	0	1	0	—		21	0
Empoli	Total		22	0	4	0	—		26	0
Nice	2022–23	Ligue 1	9	1	0	0	3	0	12	1
Sassuolo (loan)	2023–24	Serie A	15	1	3	0	0	0	18	1
Empoli (loan)	2024–25	Serie A	30	1	3	0	0	0	33	1
Fiorentina (loan)	2025–26	Serie A	10	0	0	0	5 (Note: Appearances in UEFA Conference League)	0	15	0
Career total			86	3	10	0	8	0	104	3

== Honours ==
Empoli

- Serie B: 2020–21
