= 2022–23 AC Reggiana 1919 season =

AC Reggiana 1919
2022–23 season
- Chairman: Carmelo Salerno
- Manager: Aimo Diana
- Stadium: Mapei Stadium – Città del Tricolore
- Serie C: 1st
- Coppa Italia: Preliminary round
- Coppa Italia Serie C: First round

The 2022–23 AC Reggiana 1919 season is the club's 104th season in existence and its second consecutive season in the third division of Italian football. In addition to the domestic league, Reggiana are participating in this season's edition of the Coppa Italia and the Coppa Italia Serie C. The season covers the period from 1 July 2022 to 30 June 2023.

== Players ==
=== First-team squad ===
As of 17 January 2023

Note: Flags indicate national team as defined under FIFA eligibility rules; some limited exceptions apply. Players may hold more than one non-FIFA nationality.

No.	Pos.	Nation	Player
1	GK	ITA	Matteo Voltolini
3	DF	ITA	Cristian Cauz
4	DF	ITA	Paolo Rozzio (captain)
5	MF	ITA	Fausto Rossi
6	MF	ITA	Andrea Vallocchia
7	FW	ITA	Marco Rosafio
8	MF	ITA	Luca Cigarini
10	FW	ITA	Eric Lanini (on loan from Parma)
11	FW	ITA	Jacopo Pellegrini (on loan from Sassuolo)
15	DF	ITA	Riccardo Fiamozzi
16	DF	ITA	Alessio Luciani
17	DF	ITA	Lorenzo Libutti
18	FW	POR	Muhamed Djamanca
19	MF	BFA	Abdoul Guiebre (on loan from Modena)

No.	Pos.	Nation	Player
21	MF	ITA	Mattia Muroni
22	GK	ITA	Giacomo Venturi
23	DF	ITA	Giuliano Laezza
24	MF	ITA	Filippo Nardi (on loan from Cremonese)
26	DF	ITA	Michele Cremonesi
28	FW	ITA	Christian Capone (on loan from Atalanta)
32	FW	ITA	Adriano Montalto (on loan from Reggina)
33	DF	ITA	Manuel Nicoletti
44	MF	ITA	Davide Guglielmotti
55	DF	BUL	Andrea Hristov (on loan from Cosenza)
65	DF	ITA	Denis Chiesa
77	MF	ALB	Elvis Kabashi
88	MF	ITA	Daniele Sciaudone

=== Out on loan ===
Note: Flags indicate national team as defined under FIFA eligibility rules; some limited exceptions apply. Players may hold more than one non-FIFA nationality.

No.	Pos.	Nation	Player
—	FW	ITA	Andrea Arrighini (at Pro Vercelli until 30 June 2023)
—	MF	ITA	Filippo Orsi (at Real Calepina until 30 June 2023)

== Competitions ==
=== Overview ===
Competition	First match	Last match	Starting round	Final position	Record							
Competition	First match	Last match	Starting round	Final position	Pld	W	D	L	GF	GA	GD	Win %
Serie C	4 September 2022	May 2023	Matchday 1		0	0	0	0	0	0	+0	—
Coppa Italia	31 July 2022		Preliminary round	Preliminary round	1	0	0	1	2	3	−1	0.00
Coppa Italia Serie C	1 November 2022		First round	First round	1	0	0	1	0	1	−1	0.00
Total					2	0	0	2	2	4	−2	0.00

Last updated: March 2023
Source: Soccerway

=== Serie C ===
==== League table ====
Pos	Team	Pld	W	D	L	GF	GA	GD	Pts	Qualification
1	Reggiana (C, P)	38	24	9	5	63	27	+36	81	Promotion to Serie B. Qualification for the Supercoppa di Serie C
2	Cesena	38	23	10	5	66	24	+42	79 (Note: Cesena ahead of Virtus Entella due to head-to-head matches: ENT-CES 0-0; CES-ENT 4-0)	Qualification for the promotion play-offs national phase
3	Virtus Entella	38	23	10	5	60	31	+29	79	Qualification for the promotion play-offs national phase
4	Carrarese	38	18	8	12	51	42	+9	62	Qualification for the promotion play-offs group phase
5	Gubbio	38	17	10	11	50	34	+16	61	Qualification for the promotion play-offs group phase

Updated to match(es) played on 6 April 2023. Source: Lega Pro, Soccerway (in English)
Rules for classification: 1) Points; 2) Head-to-head points; 3) Head-to-head goal difference; 4) Goal difference; 5) Goals scored; 6) Lower goals against; 7) Wins; 8) Lower losses; 9) Away wins; 10) Lower home losses.
(C) Champions; (P) Promoted

==== Results summary ====
Overall								Home						Away					
Pld	W	D	L	GF	GA	GD	Pts	W	D	L	GF	GA	GD	W	D	L	GF	GA	GD
0	0	0	0	0	0	0	0	0	0	0	0	0	0	0	0	0	0	0	0

Last updated: March 2023.

==== Results by round ====
Round	1
Ground	
Result	
Position	

Updated to match(es) played on March 2023. Source:
A = Away; H = Home; W = Win; D = Draw; L = Loss

==== Matches ====
The league fixtures were announced on 26 August 2022.

September 2022 1	Reggiana	–
CET (UTC+1)

=== Coppa Italia ===
31 July 2022 Preliminary round	Palermo	3–2	Reggiana	Palermo
21:00 CEST (UTC+1)	Brunori 3', 40', 80' (pen.)		Rosafio 57' (pen.); D'Angelo 88'	Stadium: Stadio Renzo Barbera; Attendance: 13,297; Referee: Daniele Rutella

=== Coppa Italia Serie C ===
1 November 2022 Second round	Reggiana	0–1	Pontedera	Reggio Emilia
14:30 CET (UTC+1)				Stadium: Mapei Stadium – Città del Tricolore
