= Szymon Żurkowski =

Polish footballer

Personal information
- Full name: Szymon Piotr Żurkowski
- Date of birth: 25 September 1997 (age 29)
- Place of birth: Tychy, Poland
- Height: 1.85 m (6 ft 1 in)
- Position: Midfielder

Youth career
- MOSiR Jastrzebie Zdroj
- 2012–2014: Gwarek Zabrze

Senior career*
Years	Team	Apps	(Gls)
2014–2016	Gwarek Zabrze	30	(7)
2016–2017	Górnik Zabrze II	15	(0)
2016–2019	Górnik Zabrze	58	(5)
2019–2023	Fiorentina	4	(0)
2019	→ Górnik Zabrze (loan)	16	(1)
2020–2022	→ Empoli (loan)	67	(9)
2023	→ Spezia (loan)	11	(0)
2023–2026	Spezia	17	(0)
2024	→ Empoli (loan)	13	(4)
2024–2025	→ Empoli (loan)	5	(0)

International career
2017–2019	Poland U21	13	(2)
2022	Poland	7	(0)
- * Club domestic league appearances and goals as of 23:19, 8 May 2026 (UTC)

Szymon Piotr Żurkowski (born 25 September 1997) is a Polish professional footballer who plays as a midfielder.

== Club career ==
Żurkowski started his career with Gwarek Zabrze.

=== Italy ===
On 28 January 2019, Żurkowski moved to Italian club Fiorentina on a contract until 30 June 2023. He stayed on loan at Górnik Zabrze for the remainder of the 2018–19 season.

On 30 January 2020, he joined Empoli on loan. On 1 September 2020, he returned to Empoli for another loan spell, until 30 June 2021.

On 12 January 2023, Żurkowski moved to Spezia on another loan, this time with an obligation to buy.

On 9 January 2024, for the third time in his career, Żurkowski moved to Empoli on loan until the end of the season. He debuted four days later, scoring once in a 2–1 loss against Hellas Verona after coming on as a substitute. Żurkowski scored his first career hat-trick in a 3–0 win over Monza on 21 January 2024, becoming the first Polish player to achieve this feat in Serie A. In June 2024, he underwent ankle surgery, sidelining him for several months.

Despite health issues, Żurkowski was sent on yet another loan to Empoli on 31 July 2024, with an option to make the move permanent at the end of the season. He missed the first half of the 2024–25 campaign due to his injured ankle. Żurkowski made five substitute appearances at the start of 2025, before having his season cut short in February by a knee injury, which required surgery in April later that year. His contract was terminated by mutual consent on 11 July 2026.

== International career ==
=== Under-21 ===
During the 2019 UEFA European Under-21 Championship qualification, from September 2017 to March 2018, Żurkowski played five of the Polish U21's six group games, scoring one goal.

=== Senior team ===
In May 2018, Żurkowski was named in the 35-man provisional squad for Poland for the 2018 FIFA World Cup, but was not included in the 23-man squad. On 24 March 2022, he debuted for in a friendly match against Scotland.

Żurkowski was included in the final 23-man Polish squad for the 2022 FIFA World Cup, but did not play in any match.

== Career statistics ==
=== Club ===
As of match played 14 September 2025

Appearances and goals by club, season and competition
Club	Season	League			National cup (Note: Includes Polish Cup, Coppa Italia)		Europe		Total	
Club	Season	Division	Apps	Goals	Apps	Goals	Apps	Goals	Apps	Goals
Górnik Zabrze II	2016–17	III liga	15	0	—		—		15	0
Górnik Zabrze	2016–17	I liga	9	1	0	0	—		9	1
Górnik Zabrze	2017–18	Ekstraklasa	34	2	4	1	—		38	3
Górnik Zabrze	2018–19	Ekstraklasa	31	3	3	2	3 (Note: Appearances in UEFA Europa League)	0	37	5
Górnik Zabrze	Total		74	6	7	3	3	0	84	9
Fiorentina	2019–20	Serie A	2	0	0	0	—		2	0
Fiorentina	2022–23	Serie A	2	0	0	0	2 (Note: Appearances in UEFA Europa Conference League)	0	4	0
Fiorentina	Total		4	0	0	0	2	0	6	0
Empoli (loan)	2019–20	Serie B	7	1	0	0	—		7	1
Empoli (loan)	2020–21	Serie B	25	2	0	0	—		25	2
Empoli (loan)	2021–22	Serie A	35	6	2	0	—		37	6
Empoli (loan)	Total		67	9	2	0	0	0	69	9
Spezia (loan)	2022–23	Serie A	11	0	0	0	—		11	0
Spezia	2023–24	Serie B	16	0	1	0	—		17	0
Spezia	2025–26	Serie B	1	0	0	0	—		1	0
Spezia	Total		28	0	1	0	—		29	0
Empoli (loan)	2023–24	Serie A	13	4	1	0	—		14	4
Empoli (loan)	2024–25	Serie A	5	0	0	0	—		5	0
Career total			206	19	11	3	5	0	222	22

=== International ===
As of match played 16 November 2022

Appearances and goals by national team and year
National team	Year	Apps	Goals
Poland
Poland	2022	7	0
Total		7	0

== Honours ==
Empoli

- Serie B: 2020–21

Individual

- Polish Newcomer of the Year: 2017
- Ekstraklasa Discovery of the Season: 2017–18
