= Andrea La Mantia =

Italian footballer (born 1991)

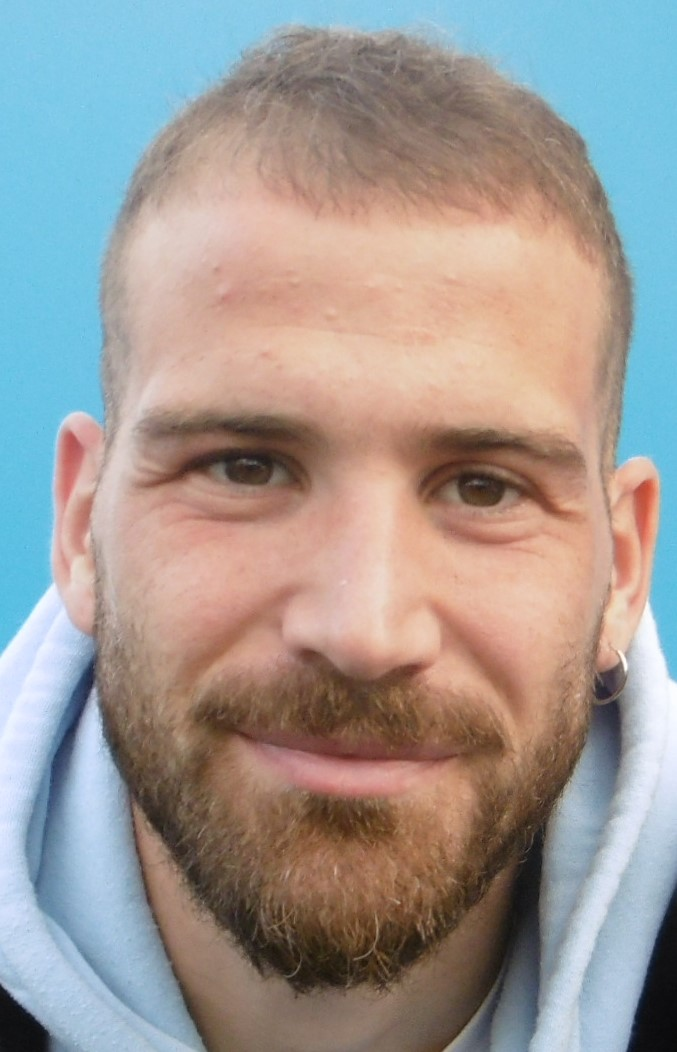

Personal information
- Date of birth: 6 May 1991 (age 35)
- Place of birth: Marino, Italy
- Height: 1.90 m (6 ft 3 in)
- Position: Forward

Team information
- Current team: Gubbio
- Number: 19

Youth career
- –2009: Frosinone
- 2008–2009: → Flaminia Civita Castellana (loan)

Senior career*
Years	Team	Apps	(Gls)
2009–2013	Frosinone	11	(1)
2010–2011	→ Foligno (loan)	24	(2)
2012	→ Fidelis Andria (loan)	7	(2)
2012–2013	→ Barletta (loan)	28	(6)
2013–2015	Barletta	14	(4)
2014–2015	→ San Marino (loan)	30	(6)
2015–2016	Cosenza	24	(13)
2016–2017	Pro Vercelli	25	(9)
2017–2018	Virtus Entella	40	(12)
2018–2020	Lecce	44	(19)
2020	→ Empoli (loan)	12	(2)
2020–2023	Empoli	52	(13)
2022–2023	→ SPAL (loan)	34	(5)
2023–2025	SPAL	1	(0)
2023–2024	→ Feralpisalò (loan)	37	(8)
2024–2025	→ Catanzaro (loan)	14	(1)
2025–	Gubbio	29	(5)
- * Club domestic league appearances and goals as of 30 April 2026

Andrea La Mantia (born 6 May 1991) is an Italian professional footballer who plays as a forward for Serie C Group B club Gubbio.

== Club career ==
He made his professional debut in the Serie B for Frosinone on 28 November 2009 in a game against AlbinoLeffe.

On 11 January 2020 he joined Empoli on loan with an obligation to buy.

On 19 July 2022, La Mantia moved to SPAL on loan with a conditional obligation to buy.

The obligation to buy was triggered and SPAL purchased La Mantia's rights, and on 8 August 2023 he was loaned to Feralpisalò, with an option to buy. On 30 August 2024, La Mantia was loaned to Catanzaro in Serie B.

== Career statistics ==
=== Club ===
As of match played 23 August 2023

Appearances and goals by club, season and competition
Club	Season	League			National Cup (Note: Includes Coppa Italia, Coppa Italia Serie C)		Europe		Other		Total	
Club	Season	Division	Apps	Goals	Apps	Goals	Apps	Goals	Apps	Goals	Apps	Goals
Frosinone	2009–10	Serie B	4	0	0	0	—		—		4	0
Frosinone	2010–11	Serie B	0	0	1	0	—		—		1	0
Frosinone	2011–12	Lega Pro 1	7	1	2	0	—		—		9	1
Frosinone	2012–13	Lega Pro 1	0	0	1	0	—		—		1	0
Frosinone	Total		11	1	4	0	—		—		15	1
Foligno (loan)	2010–11	Lega Pro 1	22	1	0	0	—		2 (Note: Appearance(s) in Lega Pro play-out)	1	24	2
Fidelis Andria (loan)	2011–12	Lega Pro 1	7	2	0	0	—		—		7	2
Barletta	2012–13	Lega Pro 1	26	5	1	0	—		2	1	29	6
Barletta	2013–14	Lega Pro 1	14	4	1	0	—		—		15	4
Barletta	Total		40	9	2	0	—		2	1	44	10
San Marino (loan)	2014–15	Lega Pro	30	6	2	0	—		—		32	6
Cosenza	2015–16	Lega Pro	24	13	2	1	—		—		26	14
Pro Vercelli	2016–17	Serie B	25	9	2	1	—		—		27	10
Pro Vercelli	2017–18	Serie B	0	0	1	0	—		—		1	0
Pro Vercelli	Total		25	9	3	0	—		—		28	10
Entella	2017–18	Serie B	40	12	0	0	—		2 (Note: Appearance(s) in Serie B play-out)	0	42	12
Lecce	2018–19	Serie B	32	17	0	0	—		—		32	17
Lecce	2019–20	Serie A	12	2	1	0	—		—		13	2
Lecce	Total		44	19	1	0	—		—		45	19
Empoli	2019–20	Serie B	12	2	0	0	—		1 (Note: Appearance(s) in Serie B play-off)	0	13	2
Empoli	2020–21	Serie B	34	11	2	0	—		—		36	11
Empoli	2021–22	Serie A	18	2	1	1	—		—		19	3
Empoli	Total		64	15	3	1	—		1	0	68	16
SPAL (loan)	2022–23	Serie B	34	5	1	0	—		—		35	5
Career total			341	92	18	3	—		7	2	366	97
