= Leonardo Mancuso =

Italian footballer (born 1992)

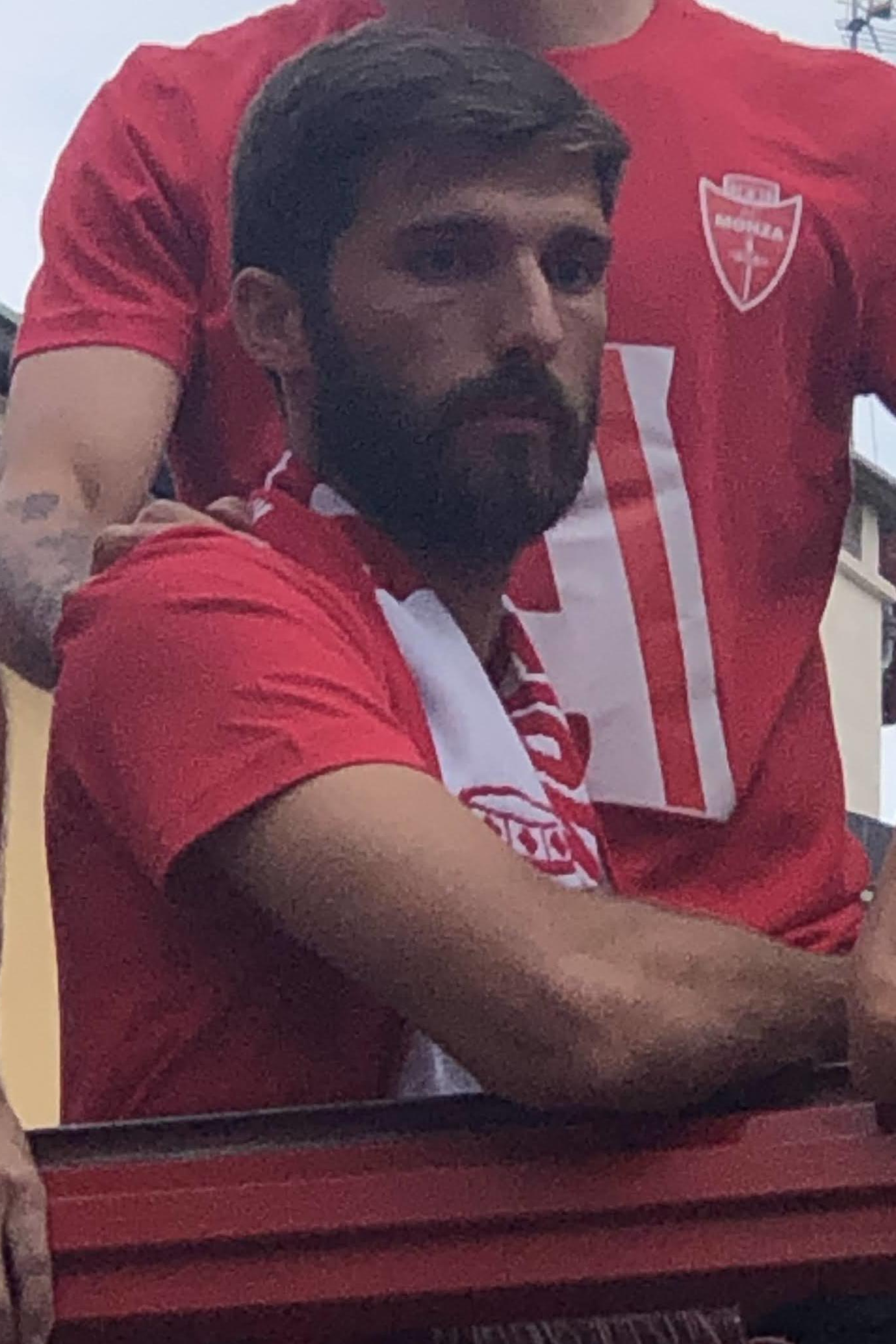
- Mancuso with Monza in 2022

Personal information
- Date of birth: 26 May 1992 (age 34)
- Place of birth: Milan, Italy
- Height: 1.82 m (6 ft 0 in)
- Positions: Forward; winger

Team information
- Current team: Arezzo
- Number: 11

Youth career
- –2011: AC Milan

Senior career*
Years	Team	Apps	(Gls)
2011–2012	Pizzighettone	37	(11)
2012–2014	Carrarese	54	(12)
2014–2015	Cittadella	14	(0)
2015	→ Catanzaro (loan)	16	(3)
2015–2016	Catanzaro	34	(2)
2016–2017	Sambenedettese	37	(22)
2017–2018	Pescara	14	(2)
2018–2019	Juventus	0	(0)
2018–2019	→ Pescara (loan)	55	(26)
2019–2022	Empoli	83	(34)
2022	→ Monza (loan)	16	(1)
2022–2024	Monza	0	(0)
2022–2023	→ Como (loan)	32	(6)
2023–2024	→ Palermo (loan)	26	(4)
2024–2026	Mantova	73	(18)
2026–	Arezzo	2	(1)

International career
2013	Italy U20 C	1	(0)
- * Club domestic league appearances and goals as of 20 September 2026

Leonardo Mancuso (born 26 May 1992) is an Italian professional footballer who plays as a forward or winger for Serie B club Arezzo.

== Club career ==
=== Early career ===
Born in Milan, Lombardy, Mancuso was a youth product of AC Milan. He was in the reserve B, or U-18 "Berretti" team, during the 2009–10 season. Mancuso was then promoted to become a member of the reserve "Primavera" during the 2010–11 season; however, he only made a handful of appearances.

In mid-2011, he was transferred to Serie D (fifth division) team Pizzighettone for the 2011–12 season. On 5 July 2012, Lega Pro (third division) club Carrarese announced that they had signed Mancuso from Pizzighettone in a permanent deal.

In July 2016, Mancuso sign with newly promoted Serie C (third division) club Sambenedettese. After a strong season, scoring 25 goals in 40 matches, he joined Pescara. On 31 January 2018, Mancuso joined Juventus, with Cristian Bunino moving in the opposite direction. Mancuso immediately returned to Pescara on an 18-month loan.

=== Empoli ===
On 13 July 2019, Mancuso signed for Serie B side Empoli. On 28 October 2020, Mancuso scored a hat-trick in Empoli's upset of Serie A side Benevento in the third round of the Coppa Italia. Less than two months later on 12 December, Mancuso scored four times in a 5–2 away victory over Virtus Entella in league action.

=== Monza ===
On 20 January 2022, Monza signed Mancuso on a two-year loan with an obligation for purchase. Following Monza's Serie A promotion on 29 May 2022, Mancuso's obligation for purchase clause was triggered.

==== Loans to Como and Palermo ====
Mancuso was loaned out to Como for one year. He was sent on a one-year loan to Palermo on 5 July 2023, with an option and obligation for purchase.

=== Mantova ===
On 12 July 2024, Mancuso joined Mantova on a permanent deal.

== International career ==
Mancuso was selected by the Serie D representative team for the Torneo di Viareggio in January 2012. He was called up to Italy under-20 C team in February 2013, and made his debut on 7 February, as half-time substitute for Leonardo Gatto.

== Career statistics ==
=== Club ===
As of match played 29 May 2022

Appearances and goals by club, season and competition
Club	Season	League			Coppa Italia		Other		Total	
Club	Season	Division	Apps	Goals	Apps	Goals	Apps	Goals	Apps	Goals
Pizzighettone	2011–12	Serie D	37	11	—		1 (Note: Appearance in Serie D promotion play-off)	0	38	11
Carrarese	2012–13	Lega Pro	30	8	2	0	—		32	8
Carrarese	2013–14	Lega Pro	24	3	0	0	—		24	3
Carrarese	Total		54	11	2	0	0	0	56	11
Cittadella	2014–15	Serie B	14	0	2	0	—		16	0
Catanzaro (loan)	2014–15	Lega Pro	16	3	0	0	—		16	3
Catanzaro	2015–16	Lega Pro	34	2	1	0	1 (Note: Appearance in Coppa Italia Lega Pro)	0	36	2
Sambenedettese	2016–17	Lega Pro	37	22	—		5 (Note: Three appearances three goals in Lega Pro promotion play-offs, two appearances one goal in Coppa Italia Lega Pro)	4	42	26
Pescara	2017–18	Serie B	14	2	1	0	—		15	2
Juventus	2017–18	Serie A	—		—		—		0	0
Juventus	2018–19	Serie A	—		—		—		0	0
Juventus	Total		0	0	0	0	0	0	0	0
Pescara (loan)	2017–18	Serie B	20	7	0	0	—		20	7
Pescara (loan)	2018–19	Serie B	35	19	2	0	—		39	19
Pescara (loan)	Total		55	26	2	0	0	0	59	26
Empoli	2019–20	Serie B	38	13	3	1	1 (Note: Appearance(s) in Serie B promotion play-offs)	0	42	14
Empoli	2020–21	Serie B	37	20	2	3	—		39	23
Empoli	2021–22	Serie A	8	1	2	3	—		10	4
Empoli	Total		83	34	7	7	1	0	91	41
Monza (loan)	2021–22	Serie B	16	1	—		4	1	20	2
Career total			359	112	15	7	12	5	389	124
