= Roberto De Filippis =

Italian former professional footballer

Personal information
- Date of birth: 28 January 1988 (age 38)
- Place of birth: Milan, Italy
- Position: Midfielder

Youth career
- 2001–2007: Internazionale
- 2007: → Pro Sesto (loan)
- 2007–2008: Pro Sesto

Senior career*
Years	Team	Apps	(Gls)
2008–2010	Pro Sesto	35	(3)
2010–2011	Viterbese	0	(0)
- * Club domestic league appearances and goals

Roberto De Filippis (born 28 January 1988) is an Italian former professional footballer who played as a midfielder.

== Career ==
Born in Milan, Lombardy, De Filippis started his career at Internazionale, which he played from Giovanissimi Regionali (under-15 team) in 2001–02 to Primavera under-20 team in 2006–07 season. He also named as a member of 2006–07 UEFA Champions League as home-grown player (B list) In January 2007 he left for Pro Sesto along with Marco Modolo, and Daniele Marino. He then played for the first team from 2008 to 2010.

In 2010 the club relegated back to Serie D and folded soon after. He then joined Serie D team Viterbese.

== Honours ==
Pro Sesto youth

- Campionato Nazionale Dante Berretti: 2008
