= Riccardo Fiamozzi =

Italian professional footballer

Personal information
- Date of birth: 18 May 1993 (age 33)
- Place of birth: Trento, Italy
- Height: 1.78 m (5 ft 10 in)
- Positions: Full-back; midfielder

Team information
- Current team: Trento
- Number: 29

Youth career
- Varese

Senior career*
Years	Team	Apps	(Gls)
2011–2015	Varese	83	(1)
2015–2016	Pescara	15	(0)
2016–2018	Genoa	12	(0)
2017	→ Frosinone (loan)	19	(0)
2017–2018	→ Bari (loan)	14	(0)
2018	→ Pescara (loan)	11	(0)
2018–2021	Lecce	11	(1)
2020–2021	→ Empoli (loan)	43	(0)
2021–2022	Empoli	10	(0)
2023–2025	Reggiana	65	(1)
2025–	Trento	16	(0)

International career
2011–2012	Italy U19	14	(0)
2012–2013	Italy U20	5	(0)
- * Club domestic league appearances and goals as of 29 April 2026

Riccardo Fiamozzi (born 18 May 1993) is an Italian professional footballer who plays as a full-back or midfielder for Serie C Group A club Trento.

== Club career ==
=== Varese ===
Born in Trento, Trentino, Fiamozzi started his playing career at Varese. After Varese failed to win promotion to Serie A, Torino signed Fiamozzi in June 2012 for €370,000 and sold striker Osarimen Ebagua back to Varese for €470,000. He was immediately loaned back to Varese by Torino for the 2012–13 Serie B season. That year, he made his first team debut for Varese, playing in the Coppa Italia, as well as making 14 appearances for the senior team during the season.

In June 2013, Varese bought back Fiamozzi in a co-ownership deal from Torino. He scored his first goal in Serie B during Varese-Pescara, 3–2. On 21 June 2014, Torino's 50% share of Fiamozzi was redeemed by Varese.

=== Lecce ===
On 25 July 2018, Fiamozzi signed a three-year contract with Serie B side Lecce.

==== Empoli ====
On 10 January 2020 he was loaned to Empoli for a two-year term with a purchase option.

=== Reggiana ===
On 17 January 2023, Fiamozzi joined Serie C club Reggiana.

== International career ==
Fiamozzi played all 6 games in 2012 UEFA European Under-19 Football Championship qualification and elite qualification. He wore the number 9 shirt, playing the first game as a substitute of Gianluca Caprari. He then became a starting player in round 2 and 3, before substituting Elio De Silvestro, Massimiliano Busellato and Mattia Valoti in the Elite round respectively.

== Career statistics ==
=== Club ===
As of match played 23 August 2023

Appearances and goals by club, season and competition
Club	Season	League			National Cup (Note: Includes Coppa Italia)		Europe		Other		Total	
Club	Season	Division	Apps	Goals	Apps	Goals	Apps	Goals	Apps	Goals	Apps	Goals
Varese	2012–13	Serie B	14	0	1	0	—		—		15	0
Varese	2013–14	Serie B	27	1	2	0	—		2 (Note: Appearance(s) in Serie B play-out)	0	31	1
Varese	2014–15	Serie B	40	0	2	0	—		—		42	0
Varese	Total		81	1	5	0	—		2	0	88	1
Pescara	2015–16	Serie B	15	0	0	0	—		—		15	0
Genoa	2015–16	Serie A	8	0	0	0	—		—		8	0
Genoa	2016–17	Serie A	4	0	1	0	—		—		5	0
Genoa	Total		12	0	1	0	—		—		13	0
Frosinone (loan)	2016–17	Serie B	19	0	0	0	—		2 (Note: Appearance(s) in Serie B play-off)	0	21	0
Bari (loan)	2017–18	Serie B	14	0	1	0	—		—		15	0
Pescara (loan)	2017–18	Serie B	11	0	0	0	—		—		11	0
Lecce	2018–19	Serie B	11	1	2	0	—		—		13	1
Lecce	2019–20	Serie A	0	0	1	0	—		—		1	0
Lecce	Total		11	1	3	0	—		—		14	1
Empoli	2019–20	Serie B	17	0	0	0	—		1	0	18	0
Empoli	2020–21	Serie B	26	0	0	0	—		—		26	0
Empoli	2021–22	Serie A	10	0	2	0	—		—		12	0
Empoli	Total		53	0	2	0	—		—		56	0
Reggiana	2022–23	Serie C	12	0	0	0	—		2 (Note: Appearance(s) in Supercoppa di Serie C)	0	14	0
Career total			228	2	12	0	—		7	0	247	2
