= Leo Štulac =

Slovenian footballer (born 1994)

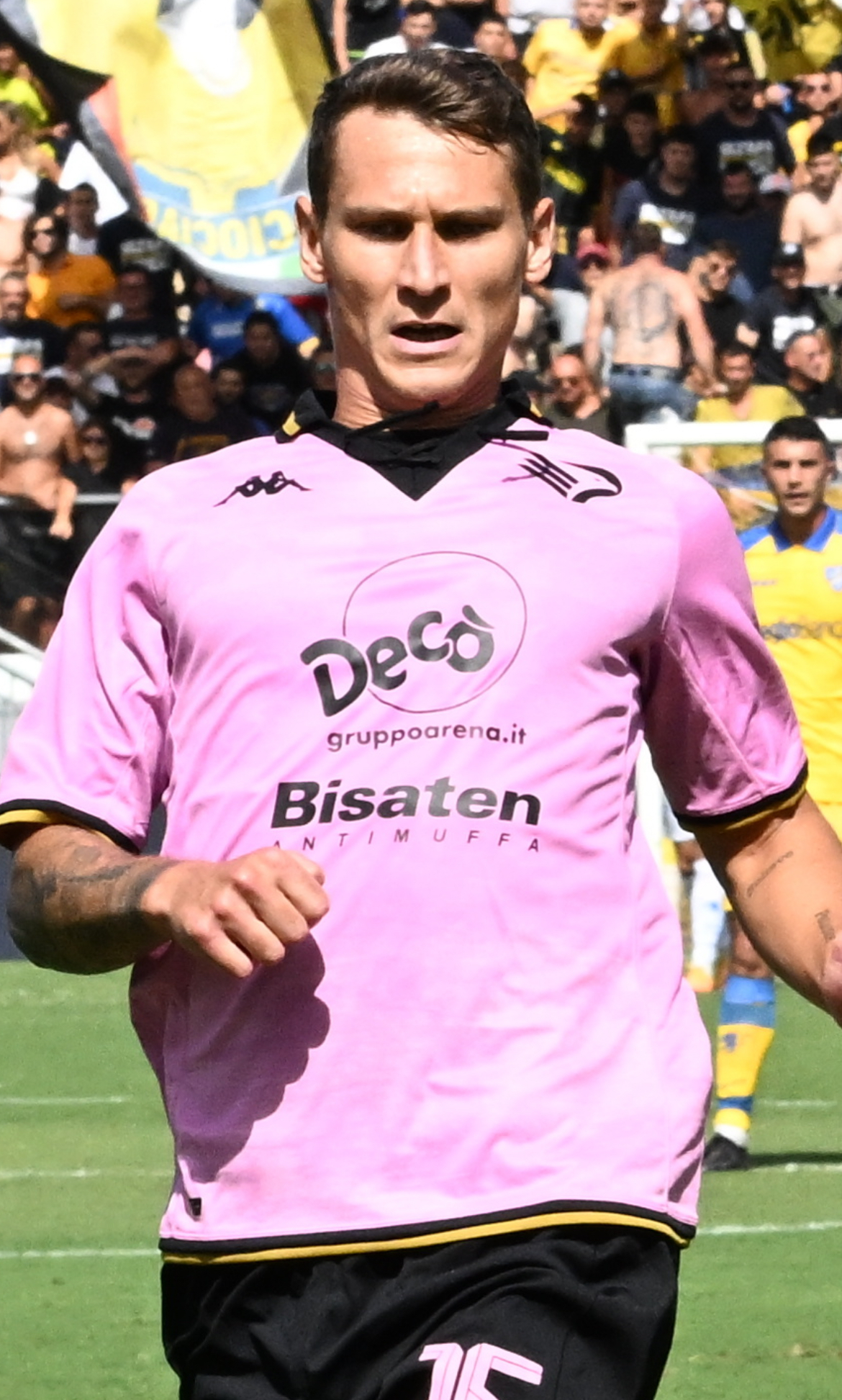
- Štulac with Palermo in 2022

Personal information
- Date of birth: 26 September 1994 (age 32)
- Place of birth: Koper, Slovenia
- Height: 1.75 m (5 ft 9 in)
- Position: Midfielder

Team information
- Current team: Koper
- Number: 4

Youth career
- –2011: Koper

Senior career*
Years	Team	Apps	(Gls)
2011–2016	Koper	94	(8)
2013	→ Jadran Dekani (loan)	13	(4)
2016–2018	Venezia	34	(6)
2018–2019	Parma	26	(0)
2019–2023	Empoli	83	(7)
2022–2023	→ Palermo (loan)	11	(0)
2023–2026	Palermo	21	(4)
2024–2026	→ Reggiana (loan)	14	(0)
2026	Istra 1961	10	(0)
2026–	Koper	0	(0)

International career
2010	Slovenia U17	2	(0)
2011–2012	Slovenia U18	11	(1)
2012	Slovenia U19	7	(0)
2015–2016	Slovenia U21	12	(5)
2018–2021	Slovenia	8	(0)
- * Club domestic league appearances and goals as of 18 July 2026

Leo Štulac (born 26 September 1994) is a Slovenian professional footballer who plays as a midfielder for Slovenian PrvaLiga club Koper.

== Club career ==
=== Koper ===
Born in Koper, Štulac started his career at hometown club FC Koper. He made his Slovenian PrvaLiga debut on 2 April 2011, aged 16, in a 3–0 victory against Maribor.

In 2013, Štulac joined third division side Jadran Dekani on loan, where he scored 4 goals in 13 games.

With Koper, Štulac won the Slovenian Cup during the 2014–15 season and the Slovenian Supercup in 2015.

=== Venezia ===
On 15 July 2016, Štulac joined the Lega Pro side Venezia. In his first season, he gained promotion to Serie B. He also won the Coppa Italia Lega Pro with the club.

Štulac scored his first Serie B goal on 24 October 2017 in a 2–1 away defeat against Cittadella. On 5 May 2018, he scored the winner in a 2–1 victory against Foggia.

=== Parma ===
On 30 June 2018, Štulac signed for Serie A club Parma on a five-year contract.

=== Empoli ===
On 26 July 2019, Štulac signed with Serie B club Empoli. With Empoli, he won promotion to Serie A in 2021, and played the 2021–22 Serie A with the Tuscanians.

=== Palermo ===
On 18 August 2022, Štulac was signed by Serie B club Palermo on a loan deal with a mandatory buying option to be exercised on certain conditions.

Štulac's first season with the Rosanero was marred by injuries and was eventually cut short by a serious muscle injury that sidelined him from January until the end of the campaign. Despite that, Palermo signed him permanently from Empoli and confirmed him in the first team roster.

On 2 September 2023, Štulac scored his first league goal with Palermo in a 3–0 home win against Feralpisalò.

=== Reggiana ===
On 2 August 2024, Štulac went on a two-year loan deal to fellow Serie B side Reggiana. He was released from his contract on 26 January 2026.

== International career ==
Štulac played for various Slovenian national youth selections, such as the under-17, under-19 and under-21 teams.

In March 2018, he received his first call-up to the senior national team for the friendly matches against Austria and Belarus. He made his senior debut against Cyprus on 9 September 2018.

== Career statistics ==
As of 1 July 2023

Appearances and goals by club, season and competition
Club	Season	League			National cup (Note: Includes Slovenian Cup, Coppa Italia)		Continental		Other		Total	
Club	Season	Division	Apps	Goals	Apps	Goals	Apps	Goals	Apps	Goals	Apps	Goals
Koper	2010–11	Slovenian PrvaLiga	4	0	0	0	—		—		4	0
Koper	2011–12	Slovenian PrvaLiga	9	0	0	0	0	0	—		9	0
Koper	2012–13	Slovenian PrvaLiga	10	2	0	0	—		—		10	2
Koper	2013–14	Slovenian PrvaLiga	14	0	1	0	—		—		15	0
Koper	2014–15	Slovenian PrvaLiga	28	0	5	1	1 (Note: Appearance(s) in UEFA Europa League)	0	—		34	1
Koper	2015–16	Slovenian PrvaLiga	29	6	3	0	0	0	0	0	32	6
Koper	Total		94	8	9	1	1	0	—		104	9
Venezia	2016–17	Lega Pro	13	0	—		—		—		13	0
Venezia	2017–18	Serie B	21	6	0	0	—		3 (Note: Appearance(s) in Serie B play-offs)	1	24	7
Venezia	Total		34	6	0	0	—		3	1	37	7
Parma	2018–19	Serie A	26	0	1	0	—		—		27	0
Empoli	2019–20	Serie B	24	2	2	0	—		—		26	2
Empoli	2020–21	Serie B	36	3	1	0	—		—		37	3
Empoli	2021–22	Serie A	23	2	3	0	—		—		26	2
Empoli	2022–23	Serie A	0	0	1	0	—		—		1	0
Empoli	Total		83	7	7	0	—		—		90	7
Palermo (loan)	2022–23	Serie B	11	0	0	0	—		—		11	0
Career total			248	21	17	1	1	0	3	1	269	23

== Honours ==
Koper

- Slovenian Cup: 2014–15
- Slovenian Supercup: 2015

Venezia

- Lega Pro: 2016–17
- Coppa Italia Lega Pro: 2016–17

Empoli

- Serie B: 2020–21
