= 2016–17 Venezia FC season =

Venezia
2016–17 season
- Chairman: Joe Tacopina
- Manager: Filippo Inzaghi
- Stadium: Stadio Pier Luigi Penzo
- Lega Pro: Group B winners
- Supercoppa Lega: Runners-up
- Coppa Italia Lega Pro: Winners
- Top goalscorer: League: Alexandre Geijo (10); All: Alexandre Geijo; Stefano Moreo (12 each)

The 2016–17 season was the 110th in the history of Venezia F.C. and their first season back in the third division. The club participated in Lega Pro and Coppa Italia Lega Pro, winning both.

== Squad ==
Note: Flags indicate national team as defined under FIFA eligibility rules; some limited exceptions apply. Players may hold more than one non-FIFA nationality.

No.	Pos.	Nation	Player
1	GK	ITA	Davide Facchin
12	GK	ITA	Nicola Sambo
22	GK	ITA	Guglielmo Vicario
2	DF	ITA	Luigi Luciani
3	DF	ITA	Leonardo Galli
5	DF	ITA	Alessandro Malomo
6	DF	ITA	Maurizio Domizzi
13	DF	ITA	Marco Modolo
14	DF	ITA	Paolo Pellicanò
25	DF	ITA	Francesco Cernuto
26	DF	ITA	Agostino Garofalo
27	DF	ITA	Giuseppe Marco Zampano
4	MF	ITA	Alex Pederzoli

No.	Pos.	Nation	Player
7	MF	ITA	Simone Bentivoglio
8	MF	ITA	Evans Soligo (captain)
15	MF	SLO	Leo Štulac
20	MF	ITA	Giuseppe Caccavallo (on loan from Salernitana)
21	MF	ITA	Alberto Acquadro
24	MF	ITA	Vittorio Fabris
9	FW	ITA	Nicola Ferrari
10	FW	ITA	Gianni Fabiano
11	FW	ITA	Loris Tortori
17	FW	ITA	Davide Marsura
18	FW	ITA	Stefano Moreo (on loan from Virtus Entella)
19	FW	ESP	Álex Geijo

== Pre-season and friendlies ==
Win Draw Loss Fixtures

27 July 2016 Friendly	Jesina Calcio (Italy)	0–1	(Italy) Venezia	Italy
20:30 CEST (UTC+2)

== Competitions ==
=== Overall record ===
Competition	First match	Last match	Starting round	Final position	Record							
Competition	First match	Last match	Starting round	Final position	Pld	W	D	L	GF	GA	GD	Win %
Lega Pro	27 August 2016	7 May 2017	Matchday 1	Winners	38	23	11	4	56	29	+27	60.53
Coppa Italia Lega Pro	13 August 2016	26 April 2017	Preliminary round	Winners	9	5	3	1	17	8	+9	55.56
Total					47	28	14	5	73	37	+36	59.57

Source: Soccerway

=== Lega Pro ===
==== League table ====
Pos	Team	Pld	W	D	L	GF	GA	GD	Pts	Promotion, qualification or relegation
1	Venezia (P)	38	23	11	4	56	29	+27	80	Promotion to Serie B
2	Parma (O, P)	38	20	10	8	55	36	+19	70	Won promotion play-offs
3	Pordenone	38	19	9	10	68	42	+26	66	Promotion play-offs#first round
4	Padova	38	19	9	10	50	31	+19	66	Promotion play-offs#first round
5	Reggiana	38	16	11	11	43	36	+7	59	Promotion play-offs#first round

Updated to match(es) played on 12 May 2017. Source: Lega Pro
(O) Play-off winners; (P) Promoted

==== Results by round ====
Round	1	2	3	4	5	6	7	8	9	10	11	12	13	14	15	16	17	18	19	20	21	22	23	24	25	26	27	28	29	30	31	32	33	34	35	36	37	38
Ground	H	A	H	A	A	H	A	H	H	A	H	A	H	A	H	A	H	A	H	A	H	A	H	H	A	H	A	A	H	A	H	A	H	A	H	A	H	A
Result	W	D	D	W	W	W	L	D	W	W	D	D	W	W	L	W	W	W	D	L	W	W	D	W	W	W	W	W	W	W	D	W	W	W	D	D	D	L
Position																																						

Source: Lega Pro
A = Away; H = Home; W = Win; D = Draw; L = Loss

==== Matches ====
The league fixtures were announced on 11 August 2016.

27 August 2016 1	Venezia	1–0	Forlì	Venice
CEST (UTC+2)	G. Fabiano 21'			Stadium: Stadio Pier Luigi Penzo

3 September 2016 2	Mantova	0–0	Venezia	Mantua
CEST (UTC+2)				Stadium: Danilo Martelli

10 September 2016 3	Venezia	1–1	Reggiana	Venice
CEST (UTC+2)	M. Modolo 65'		4' A. Nolè	Stadium: Stadio Pier Luigi Penzo

13 September 2016 4	Parma	1–2	Venezia	Parma
CEST (UTC+2)	F. Evacuo (PG) 2'		89' S. Moreo; 90' M. Domizzi	Stadium: Stadio Ennio Tardini

17 September 2016 5	Ancona	0–1	Venezia	Ancona
CEST (UTC+2)			66' D. Marsura	Stadium: del Conero

24 September 2016 6	Venezia	2–0	Lumezzane	Venice
CEST (UTC+2)	N. Ferrari 25'; E. Allegra (OG) 77'			Stadium: Stadio Pier Luigi Penzo

1 October 2016 7	Pordenone	1–0	Venezia	Pordenone
CEST (UTC+2)	D. Semenzato 27'			Stadium: Ottavio Bottecchia

8 October 2016 8	Venezia	2–2	Sambenedettese	Venice
CEST (UTC+2)	A. Pederzoli (PG) 77'; S. Bentivoglio 81'		47' A. Sabatino; 54' E. Tortolano	Stadium: Stadio Pier Luigi Penzo

15 October 2016 9	Venezia	3–1	Teramo	Venice
CEST (UTC+2)	Geijo 29'; V. Fabris 54'; Geijo 81'		23' C. Ilari	Stadium: Stadio Pier Luigi Penzo

22 October 2016 10	Modena	1–2	Venezia	Modena
CEST (UTC+2)	B. Bajner 28'		32' Geijo; 54' M. Modolo	Stadium: Alberto Braglia

29 October 2016 11	Venezia	1–1	Bassano Virtus	Venice
CEST (UTC+2)	A. Pederzoli 20'		55' N. Pasini	Stadium: Stadio Pier Luigi Penzo

5 November 2016 12	Santarcangelo	1–1	Venezia	Santarcangelo di Romagna
CET (UTC+1)	M. Valentini 84'		90' I. Baldanzeddu	Stadium: Valentino Mazzola

12 November 2016 13	Venezia	2–0	Südtirol	Venice
CET (UTC+1)	S. Moreo 28'; Geijo 38'			Stadium: Stadio Pier Luigi Penzo

19 November 2016 14	FeralpiSalò	0–1	Venezia	Salò
CET (UTC+1)			77' M. Modolo	Stadium: Lino Turina

28 November 2016 15	Venezia	1–3	Padova	Venice
CET (UTC+1)	C. De Risio (OG) 25'		28' F. Dettori; 45' M. Russo (PG); 89' Leonidas	Stadium: Stadio Pier Luigi Penzo

4 December 2016 16	Fano	0–1	Venezia	Fano
CET (UTC+1)			20' D. Marsura	Stadium: Raffaele Mancini

7 December 2016 17	Venezia	1–0	Gubbio	Venice
CET (UTC+1)	A. Pederzoli (PG) 59'			Stadium: Stadio Pier Luigi Penzo

12 December 2016 18	AlbinoLeffe	0–1	Venezia	Bergamo
CET (UTC+1)			83' N. Ferrari	Stadium: Atleti Azzurri d'Italia

18 December 2016 19	Venezia	3–3	Maceratese	Venice
CET (UTC+1)	D. Marsura 45'; S. Moreo 74'; Geijo 85'		8' M. Colombi; 82' G. Turchetta; 90' A. Quadri	Stadium: Stadio Pier Luigi Penzo

23 December 2016 20	Forlì	1–0	Venezia	Forlì
CET (UTC+1)	N. Capellini 66'			Stadium: Tullo Morgagni

30 December 2016 21	Venezia	3–1	Mantova	Venice
CET (UTC+1)	M. Domizzi 9'; S. Moreo 20'; M. Modolo 62'		17' M. Marchi	Stadium: Stadio Pier Luigi Penzo

22 January 2017 22	Reggiana	0–3	Venezia	Reggio Emilia
CET (UTC+1)			31' E. Soligo; 70' S. Moreo; 83' V. Fabris	Stadium: Città del Tricolore

29 January 2017 23	Venezia	2–2	Parma	Venice
CET (UTC+1)	S. Moreo 49'; Geijo (PG) 87'		15' Y. Baraye 18' M. Nocciolini	Stadium: Stadio Pier Luigi Penzo

5 February 2017 24	Venezia	2–1	Ancona	Venice
CET (UTC+1)	S. Moreo 49'; D. Marsura 88'		2' S. Del Sante	Stadium: Stadio Pier Luigi Penzo

12 February 2017 25	Lumezzane	1–2	Venezia	Lumezzane
CET (UTC+1)	A. Bacio Terracino 86'		21' A. Garofalo 52' G. Zampano	Stadium: Nuovo Comunale

18 February 2017 26	Venezia	1–0	Pordenone	Venice
CET (UTC+1)	Geijo 2'			Stadium: Stadio Pier Luigi Penzo

26 February 2017 27	Sambenedettese	1–3	Venezia	San Benedetto del Tronto
CET (UTC+1)	L. Mancuso (PG) 90'		52' Geijo 56' D. Marsura 90' S. Moreo	Stadium: Riviera delle Palme

5 March 2017 28	Teramo	1–4	Venezia	Teramo
CET (UTC+1)	M. Sansovini 63'		7' M. Domizzi 45' D. Marsura 56' S. Bentivoglio 90' N. Ferrari	Stadium: Gaetano Bonolis

12 March 2017 29	Venezia	1–0	Modena	Venice
CET (UTC+1)	Geijo 90'			Stadium: Stadio Pier Luigi Penzo

20 March 2017 30	Bassano Virtus	1–2	Venezia	Bassano del Grappa
CET (UTC+1)	M. Modolo (OG) 86'		7' M. Modolo 90' M. Falzerano	Stadium: Rino Mercante

26 March 2017 31	Venezia	1–1	Santarcangelo	Venice
CET (UTC+1)	Geijo (PG) 74'		40' E. Defendi	Stadium: Stadio Pier Luigi Penzo

2 April 2017 32	Südtirol	0–2	Venezia	Bolzano
CEST (UTC+2)			31' D. Marsura 43' A. Garofalo	Stadium: Druso

5 April 2017 33	Venezia	1–0	FeralpiSalò	Venice
CEST (UTC+2)	N. Ferrari (PG) 9'			Stadium: Stadio Pier Luigi Penzo

10 April 2017 34	Padova	0–1	Venezia	Padua
CEST (UTC+2)			47' S. Moreo	Stadium: Euganeo

15 April 2017 35	Venezia	1–1	Fano	Venice
CEST (UTC+2)	S. Moreo 38'		L. Capezzani 56'	Stadium: Stadio Pier Luigi Penzo

23 April 2017 36	Gubbio	0–0	Venezia	Gubbio
CEST (UTC+2)				Stadium: Pietro Barbetti

30 April 2017 37	Venezia	1–1	AlbinoLeffe	Venice
CEST (UTC+2)	L. Tortori 60'		M. Ravasio 10'	Stadium: Stadio Pier Luigi Penzo

7 May 2017 38	Maceratese	2–0	Venezia	Macerata
14:30 CEST (UTC+2)	A. Quadri 68' (pen.); L. De Grazia 82'			Stadium: Helvia Recina

==== Supercoppa Lega ====
13 May 2017 1	Cremonese	1–2	Venezia	Cremona
16:30 CEST (UTC+2)		Report		Stadium: Stadio Giovanni Zini; Attendance: 2,730; Referee: Giosuè D'Apice

27 May 2017 3	Venezia	2–4	Foggia	Venice
16:30 CEST (UTC+2)		Report		Stadium: Stadio Pier Luigi Penzo; Attendance: 2,000; Referee: Armando Ranaldi

=== Coppa Italia Lega Pro ===
13 August 2016 Preliminary round Group C	Venezia	1–0	Mantova	Venice
--:-- CEST (UTC+2)				Stadium: Stadio Pier Luigi Penzo

21 August 2016 Preliminary round Group C	Santarcangelo	2–2	Venezia	Santarcangelo di Romagna
--:-- CEST (UTC+2)				Stadium: Stadio Valentino Mazzola

8 November 2016 Round of 32	Südtirol	0–4	Venezia	Bolzano
--:-- CEST (UTC+2)				Stadium: Stadio Briuso

22 November 2016 Round of 16	Venezia	1–1 (a.e.t.) (4–2 p)	Reggio Audace	Venice
--:-- CEST (UTC+2)				Stadium: Stadio Pier Luigi Penzo

8 February 2017 Quarter-finals	Como	1–2 (a.e.t.)	Venezia	Como
--:-- CEST (UTC+2)				Stadium: Stadio Giuseppe Sinnaglia

22 February 2017 Semi-finals; First leg	Padova	1–1	Venezia	Padua
20:30 CEST (UTC+2)				Stadium: Stadio Euganeo

8 March 2017 Semi-finals; Second leg	Venezia	3–1 (4–2 agg.)	Padova	Venice
19:00 CEST (UTC+2)				Stadium: Stadio Pier Luigi Penzo

29 March 2017 Final; First leg	Matera	1–0	Venezia	Matera
20:30 CEST (UTC+2)	Negro 44'			Stadium: Stadio XXI Settembre-Franco Salerno; Attendance: 5,000; Referee: Pillimetri

26 April 2017 Final; Second leg	Venezia	3–1 (3–2 agg.)	Matera	Venice
17:00 CEST (UTC+2)	Moreo 27'; Fabbiano 34'; Ferrari 60'		Strambelli 58'	Stadium: Stadio Pier Luigi Penzo; Attendance: 2,260; Referee: Francesco Fourneau
