= Marco Modolo =

Italian footballer

Personal information
- Date of birth: 23 March 1989 (age 37)
- Place of birth: San Donà di Piave, Italy
- Height: 1.86 m (6 ft 1 in)
- Position: Defender

Youth career
- 1997–2000: SS Libertas Ceggia
- 2000–2003: US Eraclea
- 2003–2006: Sandonà
- 2006–2007: Inter Milan
- 2007: → Pro Sesto (loan)
- 2007–2008: Venezia

Senior career*
Years	Team	Apps	(Gls)
2008–2009	Sanvitese	30	(3)
2009–2010	Venezia	30	(8)
2010–2013	Pro Vercelli	50	(2)
2013–2015	Parma	0	(0)
2013–2015	→ Gorica (loan)	26	(0)
2015	Carpi	3	(0)
2015–2024	Venezia	217	(16)
- * Club domestic league appearances and goals

Marco Modolo (born 23 March 1989) is an Italian former professional footballer who played as a defender.

== Career ==
Born in San Donà di Piave in the Province of Venice, Veneto, Modolo started his career at Lombard club Internazionale. In January 2007 he left for Pro Sesto along with Roberto De Filippis and Daniele Marino. On 31 August 2007 he joined Venezia from Venice. In 2008, he joined the Serie D club Sanvitese. In 2009, he returned to Venice for re-established Venezia in the 2009–10 Serie D. In 2010, he was signed by Pro Vercelli. The club won promotion in 2011 (to the third division) and again in 2012 (to the Serie B). In the 2012–13 Serie B, he wore no.6 shirt with 18 appearances. Modolo became a free agent on 1 July 2013. He was signed by Parma F.C. on 30 August but farmed to Slovenian club Gorica on the same day, along with Nabil Taïder and Abdelaye Diakité (Crotone/Parma). Parma had farmed more than 15 players to Gorica before the deal. The paperwork of his transfer was completed on 10 October. In January 2015 he returned to Italy by signing for the Carpi; summer of 2015 plays in Venezia.

== Career statistics ==
=== Club ===
As of match played 23 August 2023

Appearances and goals by club, season and competition
Club	Season	League			National Cup (Note: Includes Slovenian Cup, Coppa Italia Serie C, Coppa Italia)		Europe		Other		Total	
Club	Season	Division	Apps	Goals	Apps	Goals	Apps	Goals	Apps	Goals	Apps	Goals
Pro Vercelli	2010–11	Lega Pro 2	18	0	—		—		1 (Note: Appearance(s) in Lega Pro play-off)	0	19	0
Pro Vercelli	2011–12	Lega Pro 1	14	0	—		—		2	1	16	1
Pro Vercelli	2012–13	Serie B	18	2	0	0	—		—		18	2
Pro Vercelli	Total		50	2	0	0	—		3	1	53	3
ND Gorica (loan)	2013–14	Prva Liga	16	0	3	0	—		—		19	0
ND Gorica (loan)	2014–15	Prva Liga	10	0	2	0	2 (Note: Appearance(s) in UEFA Europa League)	0	—		14	0
ND Gorica (loan)	Total		26	0	5	0	2	0	—		33	0
Carpi (loan)	2014–15	Serie B	3	0	0	0	—		—		3	0
Venezia	2015–16	Serie D	29	4	—		—		1 (Note: Appearance(s) in Poule Scudetto Serie D)	0	30	4
Venezia	2016–17	Lega Pro	34	5	6	0	—		2 (Note: Appearance(s) in Supercoppa di Lega Pro)	0	42	5
Venezia	2017–18	Serie B	36	3	1	0	—		3 (Note: Appearance(s) in Serie B play-off)	1	40	4
Venezia	2018–19	Serie B	32	2	0	0	—		2 (Note: Appearance(s) in Serie B play-out)	1	34	3
Venezia	2019–20	Serie B	32	1	2	0	—		—		34	1
Venezia	2020–21	Serie B	27	1	1	1	—		2	0	30	2
Venezia	2021–22	Serie A	6	0	1	0	—		—		7	0
Venezia	2022–23	Serie B	10	0	0	0	—		0	0	10	0
Venezia	Total		206	16	11	1	—		10	2	227	19
Career total			285	18	16	1	2	0	13	3	316	22

== Honours ==
Gorica

- Slovenian Cup: 2013–14

Venezia

- Serie D: 2015–16
- Lega Pro: 2016–17
- Coppa Italia Lega Pro: 2016–17
