= Daniele Quadrini =

Italian footballer (born 1980)

Personal information
- Date of birth: 12 July 1980 (age 46)
- Place of birth: Rome, Italy
- Height: 1.73 m (5 ft 8 in)
- Position: Winger

Team information
- Current team: Arezzo

Youth career
- 1997–1998: Lazio

Senior career*
| Years | Team | Apps | (Gls) |
| 1998–2001 | Sora | 53 | (5) |
| 2001–2002 | Ancona | 1 | (0) |
| 2002–2003 | Alessandria | 30 | (7) |
| 2003–2005 | Teramo | 53 | (3) |
| 2005–2009 | Treviso | 93 | (10) |
| 2005–2006 | → Padova (loan) | 31 | (5) |
| 2009–2011 | Sassuolo | 68 | (9) |
| 2012–2013 | Grosseto | 11 | (0) |
| 2013– | Arezzo | | |
- * Club domestic league appearances and goals

Daniele Quadrini (born 12 July 1980) is an Italian footballer who plays as a right winger, both in midfield as well as in an attacking trident. Quadrini wore the number 21 jersey and spent a considerable three seasons with Treviso. In August 2009, following the disbandment of his former club Treviso, he joined Serie B side Sassuolo on a free transfer. He currently plays for U.S. Arezzo.
