= Dario Voltolini =

Italian writer

Dario Voltolini (Turin, 1959) is an Italian writer. His style has often been described as "minimalism", though the author describes his writing as spontaneous and far from the patiently refined work of minimalism master Raymond Carver.

== Biography ==
After graduating in Turin, he was co-founder of the blog Nazione Indiana, a collective whose members include writers and intellectuals. He has written many novels and short stories and teaches at the writing school Scuola Holden in Turin. He collaborates to the section Tuttolibri in the Italian newspaper La Stampa.

== Works ==
- Una intuizione metropolitana, Bollati Boringhieri, 1990
- Di case e di cortili. Il Borgo Nuovo e via della Rocca in Torino, edited by B. Sacerdoti, Pluriverso, 1993
- Rincorse, Einaudi, 1994
- Neve (with Julian Schnabel), Hopefulmonster, 1996
- Forme d'onda, Feltrinelli, 1996; Laurana 2014
- Onde, RadioRai, 1996
- Fantasia della giornata, Morgana, 1997
- Le lontananze accanto a noi, RAI, 1997
- Glunk, Portofranco-Fabiani, 1998
- Il grande fiume. Impressioni sul delta del Po, Fernandel, 1998
- In gita a Torino con Dario Voltolini, Paravia /Scriptorium, 1998
- 10, Feltrinelli, 2000
- Velasco. Isolitudine. Catalogo della mostra (with Ferdinando Scianna), Charta, 2000
- Primaverile (uomini nudi al testo), Feltrinelli, 2001
- Signora, (with Rivka Rinn), Edizioni Canopo, 2002
- I confini di Torino, Quiritta, 2003
- Sotto i cieli d'Italia (with Giulio Mozzi), Sironi, 2004
- Il tempo della luce, Effigie, 2005
- Le scimmie sono inavvertitamente uscite dalla gabbia, Fandango, 2006
- Mille stelle, (with Nicola De Maria), Hopefulmonster, 2006
- Torino fatta ad arte, (with Giacomo Soffiantino), EDT, 2007
- Fabio, Manni, 2008
- Foravìa, Feltrinelli, 2010
- Corso Svizzera 49 (with Giosetta Fioroni), Frullini edizioni, 2011
- Da costa a costa (with Lorenzo Bracco), BookSprintEdizioni, 2012
- Oltre le Colonne d'Ercole (with Lorenzo Bracco), BookSprintEdizioni, 2014
- Autunnale (dalla finestra sul teatro), BookSprintEdizioni, 2015
- Pacific Palisades, Einaudi, 2017

== Works translated into English ==
- "At Obrycki's" --translated by Stiliana Milkova, "Michigan Quarterly Review" (Fall 2019)
- "An Ordinary Evening"—translated by Stiliana Milkova, Translation Review 101 (2018)
- "Saturday" - translated by Stiliana Milkova, Inventory 7 (2017)
- "Beatrixpark: an Illumination" - translated by Anne Milano Appel, Harper's Magazine (October 2011)
- "That's Enough, Paolo" - translated by Stiliana Milkova, Asymptote (January 2018)
- "Berenice and the Taboo: On Italo Calvino's Invisible Cities" - translated by Stiliana Milkova, The Wilder Voice (Winter 2017) vol. 13, issue 24.
