= Cristian Cesaretti =

Italian footballer (born 1987)

Personal information
- Date of birth: 20 June 1987 (age 39)
- Place of birth: Lucca, Italy
- Height: 1.79 m (5 ft 10 1/2 in)
- Position: Forward

Youth career
- –2007: Empoli

Senior career*
Years	Team	Apps	(Gls)
2006–2012	Empoli	30	(0)
2007–2008	→ Sangiovannese (loan)	16	(1)
2008	→ Lucchese (loan)	10	(0)
2008–2009	→ Monza (loan)	13	(1)
2009	→ Foligno (loan)	12	(1)
2011	→ Frosinone (loan)	14	(4)
2012	→ Frosinone (loan)	9	(1)
2012–2014	Frosinone	24	(2)
2014–2016	Pontedera	46	(9)
2016	FeralpiSalò	12	(0)
2016–2017	Santarcangelo	32	(7)
2017–2019	Paganese	60	(22)
2019–2020	Gubbio	17	(4)
2020	Cavese	8	(0)
2020–2021	Paganese	11	(1)
2021	Ravenna	7	(0)

International career
2007	Italy U20	1	(0)
- * Club domestic league appearances and goals as of 2 May 2021

Cristian Cesaretti (born 20 June 1987) is an Italian footballer.

== Biography ==
=== Empoli ===
Born in Lucca, Tuscany region, Cesaretti started his career at Tuscan club Empoli. In 2006–07 season, Cesaretti played 3 times for the first team, all in the cup. From 2007 to 2009, he spent 2 seasons in the third level – 2007–08 Serie C1 and 2008–09 Lega Pro Prima Divisione respectively. From 2009 to January 2011 Cesaretti was a member of the first team of Empoli in Italian Serie B. Cesaretti wore no.10 shirt in 2010–11 Serie B, which vacated by Ighli Vannucchi. In 2009–10 Serie B he wore no.20 shirt.

On 31 January 2011 Cesaretti left for fellow second division club Frosinone in temporary deal with option to sign half of the registration rights of the player. The Lazio club relegated at the end of season. Cesaretti also sent off twice that season, all with Empoli. Cesaretti wore no.6 shirt which vacated by Gennaro Scarlato for Frosinone in 2010–11 Serie B. Frosinone did not sign Cesaretti at the end of season.

Since returned to Empoli on 1 July 2011, Cesaretti added 8 games to his Empoli account, but also sent off once. That season he changed to wear no.11 vacated by Salvatore Foti, and gave the legendary no.10 to former Italian internationals Francesco Tavano.

=== Serie C ===
On 31 January 2012 Cesaretti returned to the city of Frosinone, for the third level club in the same formula. On 20 July 2012 Cesaretti signed a new 3-year contract with Frosinone after the club signed him definitively.

On 17 June 2019, Cesaretti joined Gubbio.

On 14 January 2020, he signed a 1.5-year contract with Cavese.

On 1 October 2020, he moved to Paganese.

On 1 February 2021, he signed with Ravenna.
