= Vincenzo Santoruvo =

Italian footballer

Personal information
- Full name: Vincenzo Santoruvo
- Date of birth: 8 June 1978 (age 48)
- Place of birth: Bitonto, Italy
- Height: 1.80 m (5 ft 11 in)
- Position: Striker

Team information
- Current team: Frosinone
- Number: 9

Senior career*
Years	Team	Apps	(Gls)
1993–1996	Molfetta	23	(1)
1996–1998	Fidelis Andria	0	(0)
1998–1999	Acireale	14	(0)
1999–2001	Fidelis Andria	29	(3)
2001–2004	Viterbese	102	(19)
2004–2008	Bari	142	(39)
2008–2013	Frosinone	115	(39)
- * Club domestic league appearances and goals

Vincenzo Santoruvo (born 8 June 1978) is a former Italian professional footballer. He played as a striker.
