= Giuseppe Montaperto =

Italian footballer

Personal information
- Date of birth: 23 January 2000 (age 26)
- Place of birth: Palermo, Italy
- Height: 1.78 m (5 ft 10 in)
- Position: Winger

Team information
- Current team: Acireale
- Number: 10

Youth career
- 2015–2020: Empoli
- 2017–2018: → Juventus (loan)

Senior career*
Years	Team	Apps	(Gls)
2019–2022	Empoli	0	(0)
2019–2020	→ Pianese (loan)	19	(1)
2020–2021	→ Cavese (loan)	19	(1)
2021–2022	→ Teramo (loan)	8	(0)
2022–2023	Audace Cerignola	0	(0)
2023	Viterbese	4	(0)
2023–	Acireale	16	(3)
- * Club domestic league appearances and goals as of 20 December 2023

Giuseppe Montaperto (born 23 January 2000) is an Italian professional footballer who plays as a winger for Serie D club Acireale.

== Career ==
=== Empoli ===
Born in Palermo, Montaperto started his career in Empoli youth sector. He was loaned to Juventus Youth Sector for the 2017–2018 season. He played four matches in 2017–18 UEFA Youth League.

In 2019, he was promoted to the first team.

=== Serie C loans ===
On 8 July 2019, he joined on loan to Serie C club Pianese. Montaperto made his professional debut on 31 August 2019 against Arezzo.

On 22 September 2020, he was loaned to Cavese.

On 1 September 2021, he was loaned again to Teramo.

=== Cerignola ===
On 6 September 2022, Montaperto signed with Audace Cerignola in Serie C.

=== Viterbese ===
On 3 January 2023, Montaperto moved to Viterbese.

=== Kings League ===
In March 2026, Montaperto joins the Kings League Italy with Blur’s Stallions.
