= Jacopo Furlan =

Italian footballer

Personal information
- Date of birth: 22 February 1993 (age 33)
- Place of birth: San Daniele del Friuli, Italy
- Height: 1.91 m (6 ft 3 in)
- Position: Goalkeeper

Team information
- Current team: Reggiana
- Number: 1

Youth career
- –2012: Empoli

Senior career*
Years	Team	Apps	(Gls)
2011–2012	Empoli	0	(0)
2012–2014	Viareggio	9	(0)
2015–2017	Lumezzane	42	(0)
2017–2018	Bari	0	(0)
2017	→ Monopoli (loan)	15	(0)
2017–2018	→ Trapani (loan)	37	(0)
2018–2019	Catanzaro	28	(0)
2019–2020	Catania	29	(0)
2020–2022	Empoli	5	(0)
2022–2024	Perugia	10	(0)
2024	Catania	7	(0)
2024–2026	Lecco	68	(0)
2026–	Reggiana	1	(0)
- * Club domestic league appearances and goals as of 24 August 2026

Jacopo Furlan (born 22 February 1993) is an Italian professional footballer who plays as a goalkeeper for Serie C Group B club Reggiana.

== Club career ==
He made his Serie C debut for Viareggio on 10 February 2013 in a game against Latina.

On 14 November 2018, he signed a one-year deal with Catanzaro.

On 28 June 2019, Furlan signed with Catania.

On 5 October 2020 he returned to his first club Empoli.

On 11 August 2022, Furlan signed a two-year contract with Perugia.

On 8 August 2024, Furlan joined Lecco.
