= Matteo Voltolini =

Italian footballer

Personal information
- Date of birth: 30 July 1996 (age 30)
- Place of birth: Reggio Emilia, Italy
- Height: 1.95 m (6 ft 5 in)
- Position: Goalkeeper

Team information
- Current team: US Montecchio

Youth career
- Reggiana

Senior career*
Years	Team	Apps	(Gls)
2015–2016	Reggiana	0	(0)
2015–2016	→ Inveruno (loan)	32	(0)
2016–2017	Triestina	24	(0)
2017–2019	Pisa	14	(0)
2018–2019	→ Fano (loan)	16	(0)
2019–2023	Reggiana (Note: Reggio Audace changed its name to A.C. Reggiana in 2020.)	18	(0)
2023–	US Montecchio		
- * Club domestic league appearances and goals as of 23 April 2023

Matteo Voltolini (born 30 July 1996) is an Italian professional footballer who plays as a goalkeeper for an amateur side US Montecchio.

== Career ==
Born in Reggio Emilia, Voltolini started his career in local club Reggiana.

On 28 July 2016, he joined Serie D club Triestina.

On 7 September 2017, he signed with Serie C club Pisa. Voltolini made his professional debut on 21 January 2018 against Monza. On 2 August 2018, he was loaned to Fano for the 2018–19 season.

He returned to Reggiana in 2019.
