= Tommaso Fantacci =

Italian footballer (born 1997)

Personal information
- Date of birth: 17 March 1997 (age 29)
- Place of birth: Lucca, Italy
- Height: 1.75 m (5 ft 9 in)
- Position: Attacking midfielder

Team information
- Current team: Grosseto
- Number: 25

Youth career
- –2016: Empoli

Senior career*
Years	Team	Apps	(Gls)
2016–2023	Empoli	4	(0)
2016–2017	→ Padova (loan)	5	(0)
2017–2018	→ Prato (loan)	32	(5)
2018–2019	→ Carpi (loan)	0	(0)
2019	→ Pistoiese (loan)	14	(0)
2020–2021	→ Juve Stabia (loan)	31	(4)
2021–2022	→ Gubbio (loan)	27	(1)
2022–2023	→ Pontedera (loan)	19	(1)
2023	→ Arzignano (loan)	6	(1)
2023–2024	Monterosi	28	(0)
2024–2025	Fidelis Andria	30	(6)
2025	Barletta	14	(3)
2025–2026	Virtus Francavilla	5	(1)
2026–	Grosseto	0	(0)

International career
2012	Italy U15	2	(0)
2012	Italy U16	4	(0)
2013	Italy U17	2	(0)
2015	Italy U18	1	(0)
2015	Italy U19	1	(0)
- * Club domestic league appearances and goals as of 3 May 2026

Tommaso Fantacci (born 17 March 1997) is an Italian footballer who plays as a midfielder for Serie C Group B club Grosseto.

== Club career ==
=== Empoli ===
==== Loan to Padova ====
On 27 July 2016, Fantacci was loaned to Serie C side Padova on a season-long loan deal. On 3 September he made his professional debut in Serie C for Padova as a substitute replacing Lius Maria Alfageme in the 79th minute of a 1–1 home draw against AlbinoLeffe. On 24 September, Fantacci played his first match as a starter for Padova, a 1–0 away win over Gubbio, he was replaced by Domenico Germitale in the 46th minute. Fantacci ended his season-long loan to Padova with only 5 appearances, only 1 as a starter, all in Serie C.

==== Loan to Prato ====
On 18 August 2017, Fantacci was signed by Serie C club Prato on a season-long loan deal. On 27 August he made his debut for Prato as a substitute replacing Alberto Marini in the 51st minute of a 3–1 away defeat against Viterbese Castrense. On 3 September, Fantacci played his first match as a starter for Prato, a 1–1 home draw against Livorno, he was replaced by Matteo Cavagna in the 61st minute. On 4 October he played his first entire match for Prato, a 5–2 home defeat against Carrarese. On 5 November, Fantacci scored his first professional goal, as a substitute, in the 79th minute of a 4–1 home defeat against Piacenza. On 12 November he scored his second goal in the 60th minute of a 2–2 home draw against Arzachena. On 11 February 2018 he scored his third goal in the 3rd minute of a 2–2 home draw against Pisa. Fantacci ended his loan to Prato with 32 appearances, 5 goals and 2 assist, but Prato was relegated in Serie D.

==== Loan to Carpi and Pistoiese ====
On 17 August 2018, Fantacci was loaned to Serie B club Carpi on a season-long loan deal. However his loan was terminated during the 2018–19 season winter break leaving Carpi with any appearances.

On 12 January 2019, Fantacci was loaned to Serie C side Pistoiese on a 6-month loan deal. Eight days later, on 20 January, he made his debut for Pistoiese in a 1–0 away defeat against Lucchese, he was replaced by Emmanuel Latte Lath after 68 minutes. Eight days later, on 28 January, he played his first entire match for the club, a 1–0 away win over Gozzano. On 25 February he received a red card in the 54th minute of a 2–0 home defeat against Robur Siena. Fantacci ended his loan to Pistoiese with 14 appearances, all as a starter, and 1 assist.

==== Return to Empoli ====
He made his Serie B debut for Empoli on 21 December 2019 in a game against Salernitana. He then started the next two games for Empoli, but did not appear during the rest of the season. Early in the 2020–21 Serie B season, he made one late-substitute appearance. He also appeared twice for Empoli in Coppa Italia in this period.

==== Loan to Juve Stabia ====
On 5 October 2020, he was loaned to Serie C club Juve Stabia.

==== Loan to Gubbio ====
On 11 August 2021, he moved on loan to Gubbio, again in Serie C.

==== Loans to Pontedera and Arzignano ====
On 2 July 2022, Fantacci joined Pontedera on loan. On 31 January 2023, he moved on a new loan to Arzignano.

== International career ==
Fantacci represented Italy at Under-15, Under-16, Under-17, Under-18 and Under-19 level. On 21 March 2012, Fantacci made his debut at U-15 level as a substitute replacing Federico Bonazzoli in the 70th minute of a 1–0 home win over Russia U-15. On 6 September 2012 he made his debut at U-16 level in a 3–1 away win over Switzerland U-16, he was replaced by Claudio Zappa in the 73rd minute. On 28 August 2013 he made his debut at U-17 level in a 3–2 away win over Turkey U-17, he was replaced by Nicolò Barella in the 64th minute. On 12 May 2015, Fantacci made his debut at U-18 level as a substitute replacing Giuseppe Panico in the 46th minute of a 2–0 home win over Iran U-18. On 12 August 2015, Fantacci made his debut at U-19 level in a 2–1 away win over Croatia U-18, he was replaced by Andrea Favilli in the 46th minute.

== Career statistics ==
=== Club ===
As of match played 2 February 2022

Club	Season	League			National cup		League cup		Other		Total	
Club	Season	League	Apps	Goals	Apps	Goals	Apps	Goals	Apps	Goals	Apps	Goals
Empoli	2019–20	Serie B	3	0	1	0	—		—		4	0
Empoli	2020–21	Serie B	1	0	1	0	—		—		2	0
Empoli	Total		4	0	2	0	—		—		6	5
Padova (loan)	2016–17	Serie C	5	0	0	0	2	1	—		7	1
Prato (loan)	2017–18	Serie C	32	5	0	0	3	1	—		35	6
Carpi (loan)	2018–19	Serie B	0	0	0	0	—		—		0	0
Pistoiese (loan)	2018–19	Serie C	14	0	—		—		—		14	0
Juve Stabia (loan)	2020–21	Serie C	31	4	—		—		2 (Note: Appearance(s) in Promotion Playoffs)	0	33	4
Gubbio (loan)	2021–22	Serie C	17	1	—		1	0	—		18	1
Career total			103	10	2	0	6	2	2	0	113	12
