= Alessandro Sugamele =

Italian footballer (born 2007)

Personal information
- Date of birth: 22 February 2007 (age 19)
- Place of birth: Anagni (FR), Italy
- Position: Forward

Team information
- Current team: Cagliari
- Number: 35

Youth career
- 2019–2021: Accademia Frosinone
- 2021–2026: Roma

Senior career*
Years	Team	Apps	(Gls)
2026–	Cagliari	1	(0)

International career^{‡}
2024	Italy U18	2	(0)
- * Club domestic league appearances and goals as of 13 September 2026 ‡ National team caps and goals as of 13 September 2026

Alessandro Sugamele (born 22 February 2007) is an Italian professional footballer who plays as a forward for Cagliari.

== Club career ==
Born in Anagni, in the Province of Frosinone, Sugamele grew up in the nearby Piglio. He is a youth product of Accademia Frosinone and AS Roma.

During the 2023–24 season, he became a standout with Roma's under-17, scoring 5 times in the finals, as the team from the capital won the scudetto.

In October 2024, he signed his first professional contract with Roma, as he had already started training with Daniele De Rossi's first team.

Sugamele started playing with the Primavera team during the 2024–25 season, while also leading the under-18 to a league final, along the likes of Emanuele Lulli, Muhammed Bah and Cristian Cama. But during the following season he ended up playing second fiddle to newly arrived prodigy Antonio Arena.

In January 2026, he was transferred to Serie A rivals Cagliari, where he soon established himself as a regular goalscorer with the Primavera team.

After starting to train with the Serie A first team during the 2026 summer pre-season, Sugamele was called by Fabio Pisacane for the Coppa Italia opening game against Hellas Verona.

Sugamele made his professional debut with Cagliari in a 1–0 Serie A win over Lecce on 7 September 2026, coming on for Paul Mendy at the 74th minute, and already showing his attacking abilities, even edging close to doubling the lead.

== International career ==
Sugamele is a youth international for Italy, he was per-selected with the under-17 for the Euro 2024, and then played for the under-18 team in September 2024.

== Style of play ==
A left-footed forward, Sugamele mainly plays as a number 9, where he combines finishing abilities with a capacity to combine with his teammates for quick exchanges and attacking the depth of the field.

== Honours ==
AS Roma

- Campionato Nazionale Under-16: 2022–23
- Campionato Nazionale Under-17: 2023–24
- Campionato Nazionale Under-18 runner-up: 2024–25
