= 2026–27 AS Roma season =

Roma
2026–27 season
- Owner: The Friedkin Group
- President: Dan Friedkin
- Head coach: Gian Piero Gasperini
- Stadium: Stadio Olimpico
- Serie A: 3rd
- Coppa Italia: Round of 16
- UEFA Champions League: League phase
- Top goalscorer: League: Donyell Malen (12); All: Donyell Malen (16)
- Highest home attendance: 67,598 vs Fiorentina; 24 August 2026 (Serie A)
- Lowest home attendance: 61,780 vs Cagliari; 27 October 2026 (Serie A)
- Average home league attendance: 65,759
- Biggest win: 4–0 vs Fiorentina (H); 24 August 2026 (Serie A); 4–0 vs Lecce (A); 31 August 2026 (Serie A); 4–0 vs Slovan Bratislava (H); 20 October 2026 (UEFA Champions League)
- Biggest defeat: 3–4 vs Real Madrid (H); 14 October 2026 (UEFA Champions League); 2–3 vs Manchester United (A); 3 November 2026 (UEFA Champions League)
Home colours	Away colours	Third colours

The 2026–27 season is the 100th season in the history of Associazione Sportiva Roma, and the club's 75th consecutive season in the Italian top flight. In addition to the domestic league, the club is participating in the Coppa Italia and the UEFA Champions League.

== Squad information ==
As of 3 November 2026

No.	Player	Nat.	Position(s)	Date of birth (age)	Signed from	Signed in	Contract ends	Apps.	Goals
Goalkeepers
32	Devis Vásquez	(Colombia)	GK	12 May 1998 (age 28)	(Italy) AC Milan	2025	2027	1	0
70	Giorgio De Marzi	(United States)	GK	18 April 2007 (age 19)	(Italy) Roma Primavera	2024	2027	0	0
95	Pierluigi Gollini	(Italy)	GK	18 March 1995 (age 31)	(Italy) Atalanta	2025	2027	8	0
99	Mile Svilar	(Serbia)	GK	27 August 1999 (age 27)	(Portugal) Benfica	2022	2030	139	0
Defenders
2	Devyne Rensch	(Netherlands)	RWB / LWB	18 January 2003 (age 23)	(Netherlands) Ajax	2025	2029	60	1
3	Konstantinos Koulierakis	(Greece)	CB	28 November 2003 (age 22)	(Germany) Wolfsburg	2026	2031	7	0
5	Evan Ndicka	(Ivory Coast)	CB	20 August 1999 (age 27)	(Germany) Eintracht Frankfurt	2023	2028	138	7
20	Nahuel Molina	(Argentina)	RWB / LWB	6 April 1998 (age 28)	(Spain) Atlético Madrid	2026	2030	11	1
22	Mario Hermoso	(Spain)	CB / LB	18 June 1995 (age 31)	(Spain) Atlético Madrid	2024	2027	61	7
23	Gianluca Mancini	(Italy)	CB / RB	17 April 1996 (age 30)	(Italy) Atalanta	2019	2029	332	23
26	Leonardo Balerdi	(Argentina)	CB	26 January 1999 (age 27)	(France) Marseille (loan)	2026	2027	10	2
43	Wesley	(Brazil)	RWB / LWB	6 September 2003 (age 23)	(Brazil) Flamengo	2025	2030	52	4
77	Emanuele Lulli	(Italy)	RWB	17 August 2007 (age 19)	(Italy) Roma Primavera	2026	2031	8	2
87	Daniele Ghilardi	(Italy)	CB	6 January 2003 (age 23)	(Italy) Hellas Verona	2025	2030	37	1
Midfielders
4	Bryan Cristante (c)	(Italy)	DM / CM / CB	3 March 1995 (age 31)	(Italy) Atalanta	2018	2028	374	22
7	Lorenzo Pellegrini (vc)	(Italy)	AM / CM	19 June 1996 (age 30)	(Italy) Sassuolo	2017	2027	353	62
15	Marten de Roon	(Netherlands)	DM / CM	29 March 1991 (age 35)	(Italy) Atalanta	2026	2027	11	1
17	Manu Koné	(France)	CM / DM	17 May 2001 (age 25)	(Germany) Borussia Mönchengladbach	2024	2029	90	6
61	Niccolò Pisilli	(Italy)	CM / AM	23 September 2004 (age 22)	(Italy) Roma Primavera	2023	2029	91	12
63	Alessandro Di Nunzio	(Italy)	CM	21 April 2007 (age 19)	(Italy) Roma Primavera	2026	2027	1	0
86	Rodrigo Mora	(Portugal)	AM / LW	5 May 2007 (age 19)	(Portugal) Porto	2026	2031	12	3
Forwards
9	Santiago Castro	(Argentina)	CF	18 September 2004 (age 22)	(Italy) Bologna	2026	2031	10	1
14	Donyell Malen	(Netherlands)	CF / LW	19 January 1999 (age 27)	(England) Aston Villa	2026	2030	33	27
18	Matías Soulé	(Argentina)	RW / SS	15 April 2003 (age 23)	(Italy) Juventus	2024	2029	95	17
21	Paulo Dybala	(Argentina)	RW / AM / SS	15 November 1993 (age 33)	(Italy) Juventus	2022	2027	148	45
68	Antonio Arena	(Italy)	CF	10 February 2009 (age 17)	(Italy) Roma Primavera	2025	2028	3	1

=== Out on loan ===
Note: Flags indicate national team as defined under FIFA eligibility rules; some limited exceptions apply. Players may hold more than one non-FIFA nationality.

No.	Pos.	Nation	Player
—	GK	POL	Radosław Żelezny (at Perugia until 30 June 2027)
—	DF	ESP	Angeliño (at Deportivo A Coruña until 30 June 2027)
—	DF	ALB	Marash Kumbulla (at Rayo Vallecano until 30 June 2027)
—	DF	ITA	Marco Litti (at Lecco until 30 June 2027)
—	DF	ITA	Mattia Mannini (at Benevento until 30 June 2027)
—	DF	ITA	Federico Nardin (at Pescara until 30 June 2027)
—	DF	ITA	Filippo Reale (at Carrarese until 30 June 2027)
—	DF	MAR	Anass Salah-Eddine (at Panathinaikos until 30 June 2027)

No.	Pos.	Nation	Player
—	DF	SEN	Mohamed Seck (at Foggia until 30 June 2027)
—	DF	POL	Jan Ziółkowski (at Monza until 30 June 2027)
—	MF	MAR	Neil El Aynaoui (at RB Leipzig until 30 June 2027)
—	MF	ITA	Alessandro Romano (at Cagliari until 30 June 2027)
—	FW	ITA	Tommaso Baldanzi (at Genoa until 30 June 2027)
—	FW	ITA	Luigi Cherubini (at Benevento until 30 June 2027)
—	FW	UKR	Artem Dovbyk (at Bologna until 30 June 2027)
—	FW	FRA	Robinio Vaz (at Hull City until 30 June 2027)

== Transfers ==
=== Summer window ===
==== In ====
Date	Pos.	Player	From	Fee	Notes	Ref.
1 June 2026	DF	(Italy) Daniele Ghilardi	(Italy) Hellas Verona	€8,000,000	+ €1,000,000 add-ons, from loan to definitive purchase	
1 June 2026	FW	(Netherlands) Donyell Malen	(England) Aston Villa	€25,000,000	From loan to definitive purchase	
30 July 2026	FW	(Argentina) Santiago Castro	(Italy) Bologna	€35,000,000	+ €2,000,000 add-ons	
1 August 2026	DF	(Greece) Konstantinos Koulierakis	(Germany) VfL Wolfsburg	€16,500,000	+ €1,500,000 add-ons	
12 August 2026	DF	(Argentina) Nahuel Molina	(Spain) Atlético Madrid	€13,000,000	+ €4,000,000 add-ons	
19 August 2026	MF	(Portugal) Rodrigo Mora	(Portugal) Porto	€25,000,000	+ €2,000,000 add-ons	
30 August 2026	MF	(Netherlands) Marten de Roon	(Italy) Atalanta	Free	+ €650,000 add-ons	

==== Loans in ====
Date	Pos.	Player	From	Fee	Notes	Ref.
30 August 2026	DF	(Argentina) Leonardo Balerdi	(France) Marseille	€1,000,000	With option to buy for €15,000,000	

==== Loan returns ====
Date	Pos.	Player	From	Fee	Notes	Ref.
1 June 2026	GK	(Colombia) Devis Vásquez	(Turkey) Beşiktaş	—N/a	Option to buy not exercised	

Total spending: ▼€123.5M

==== Out ====
Date	Pos.	Player	To	Fee	Notes	Ref.
1 July 2026	DF	(Saudi Arabia) Saud Abdulhamid	(France) Lens	€3,500,000	Option to buy exercised	
1 July 2026	DF	(Spain) Buba Sangaré	(Spain) Elche	€4,500,000	Option to buy exercised	
1 July 2026	FW	(Uzbekistan) Eldor Shomurodov	(Turkey) İstanbul Başakşehir	€2,800,000	Option to buy exercised	
1 July 2026	FW	(Italy) Stephan El Shaarawy	(Italy) Genoa	Free	End of contract	
1 July 2026	DF	(Turkey) Zeki Çelik	(Italy) Juventus	Free	End of contract	
29 July 2026	MF	(Italy) Riccardo Pagano	(Italy) Cesena	Free	Undisclosed	

==== Loans ended ====
Date	Pos.	Player	To	Fee	Notes	Ref.
1 July 2026	DF	(Greece) Kostas Tsimikas	(England) Liverpool	—N/a		
1 July 2026	FW	(Republic of Ireland) Evan Ferguson	(England) Brighton & Hove Albion	—N/a	Option to buy not exercised	
1 July 2026	FW	(Spain) Bryan Zaragoza	(Germany) Bayern Munich	—N/a	Option to buy not exercised	
1 July 2026	FW	(Italy) Lorenzo Venturino	(Italy) Genoa	—N/a	Option to buy not exercised	

==== Loans out ====
Date	Pos.	Player	To	Fee	Notes	Ref.
19 June 2026	FW	(Italy) Tommaso Baldanzi	(Italy) Genoa	Free	With obligation to buy for €9,500,000	
1 July 2026	MF	(Italy) Alessandro Romano	(Italy) Cagliari	€500,000	With obligation to buy for €5,000,000	
17 July 2026	DF	(Italy) Marco Litti	(Italy) Lecco	Free	From Primavera squad	
30 July 2026	FW	(Ukraine) Artem Dovbyk	(Italy) Bologna	€3,000,000	With option to buy for €20,000,000	
5 August 2026	DF	(Spain) Angeliño	(Spain) Deportivo A Coruña	Free	With option to buy for €2,000,000	
7 August 2026	DF	(Albania) Marash Kumbulla	(Spain) Rayo Vallecano	Free	With option to buy for €2,500,000 + 10% on future resale	
10 August 2026	GK	(Poland) Radosław Żelezny	(Italy) Perugia	Free	With option to buy and buy-back	
31 August 2026	DF	(Poland) Jan Ziółkowski	(Italy) Monza	Free	With option to buy for €18,000,000	
1 September 2026	MF	(Morocco) Neil El Aynaoui	(Germany) RB Leipzig	€4,000,000	With option to buy for €25,000,000	
1 September 2026	FW	(France) Robinio Vaz	(England) Hull City	€2,000,000	With option to buy for €30,000,000	
14 September 2026	DF	(Morocco) Anass Salah-Eddine	(Greece) Panathinaikos	Free	With option to buy for €7,000,000	

Total income: ▲€20.3M
Balance: ▼€103.2M

=== Winter window ===
==== In ====
Date	Pos.	Player	From	Fee	Notes	Ref.

==== Loans in ====
Date	Pos.	Player	From	Fee	Notes	Ref.

==== Loan returns ====
Date	Pos.	Player	From	Fee	Notes	Ref.

Total spending: ▼€0M

==== Out ====
Date	Pos.	Player	To	Fee	Notes	Ref.

==== Loans ended ====
Date	Pos.	Player	To	Fee	Notes	Ref.

==== Loans out ====
Date	Pos.	Player	To	Fee	Notes	Ref.

Total income: ▲€0M
Balance: ▼€0M

== Competitions ==
=== Overall record ===
Competition	First match	Last match	Starting round	Final position	Record							
Competition	First match	Last match	Starting round	Final position	Pld	W	D	L	GF	GA	GD	Win %
Serie A	24 August 2026	30 May 2027	Matchday 1	TBD	12	9	3	0	36	11	+25	75.00
Coppa Italia	12 January 2027	TBD	Round of 16	TBD	0	0	0	0	0	0	+0	—
UEFA Champions League	10 September 2026	TBD	League phase	TBD	4	1	1	2	10	8	+2	25.00
Total					16	10	4	2	46	19	+27	62.50

Last updated: 21 November 2026
Source: Soccerway

=== Serie A ===
==== League table ====
Pos	Team	Pld	W	D	L	GF	GA	GD	Pts	Qualification or relegation
1	Lazio	12	10	2	0	28	9	+19	32	Qualification for the Champions League league phase
2	Roma	12	9	3	0	36	11	+25	30	Qualification for the Champions League league phase
3	Inter Milan	11	9	1	1	28	13	+15	28	Qualification for the Champions League league phase
4	AC Milan	12	8	3	1	28	14	+14	27	Qualification for the Champions League league phase
5	Como	12	8	2	2	20	10	+10	26	Qualification for the Europa League league phase (Note: The winners of the 2026–27 Coppa Italia and the fifth-placed team both qualify for the Europa League league phase. If the Coppa Italia winners finish in the top five, the sixth-placed team will qualify for the Europa League league phase. If Italy are one of the two associations with the highest UEFA coefficient points, fifth place will qualify for the Champions League league phase and the other qualifying spots will move down one position.)

Updated to match(es) played on 22 November 2026. Source: Serie A
Rules for classification: 1) Points; 2) Head-to-head points; 3) Head-to-head goal difference; 4) Goal difference; 5) Goals scored; 6) Drawing of lots.
End-of-season ties on points for 1st or 17th are instead decided by a one- or two-leg play-off, respectively, unless the play-off would involve a UEFA competition finalist (in which case rules 2–6 apply). Rules 2–6 determine home advantage (for 17th, the better-ranked team hosts the second leg); if three or more teams are tied, they also select the two play-off teams.

==== Results summary ====
Overall								Home						Away					
Pld	W	D	L	GF	GA	GD	Pts	W	D	L	GF	GA	GD	W	D	L	GF	GA	GD
12	9	3	0	36	11	+25	30	5	1	0	17	5	+12	4	2	0	19	6	+13

Last updated: 21 November 2026.
Source: Serie A

==== Results by round ====
Round	1	2	3	4	5	6	7	8	9	10	11	12	13	14	15	16	17	18	19	20	21	22	23	24	25	26	27	28	29	30	31	32	33	34	35	36	37	38
Ground	H	A	H	A	H	A	H	A	H	A	H	A	H	A	A	H	H	A	H	A	H	A	H	H	A	H	A	A	H	H	A	H	A	H	A	A	H	A
Result	W	W	W	W	D	D	W	D	W	W	W	W																										
Position	1	1	1	1	1	3	3	3	3	3	3																											

Updated to match(es) played on 21 November 2026. Source: Serie A
A = Away; H = Home; W = Win; D = Draw; L = Loss

==== Matches ====
The match schedule was released on 5 June 2026.

24 August 2026 1	Roma	4–0	Fiorentina	Rome
20:45 CEST (UTC+2)	Malen 27', 52', 60'; Hermoso (yellow card) 39'; Koné (yellow card) 49'; Pisilli 86'	Report	Fagioli (yellow card) 30'; Pellegrino (yellow card) 63'	Stadium: Stadio Olimpico; Attendance: 67,598; Referee: Matteo Marcenaro

31 August 2026 2	Lecce	0–4	Roma	Lecce
18:30 CEST (UTC+2)	Ilić (yellow card) 90'	Report	Malen 4', 23', (yellow card) 9'; Soulé 25'; Mora 65'	Stadium: Stadio Via del mare Attendance: 27,031; Referee: Daniele Chiffi

5 September 2026 3	Roma	2–1	Atalanta	Rome
20:45 CEST (UTC+2)	Hermoso 90'; Soulé 90+3'	Report	Éderson 47'; Bellanova (yellow card) 84'; Gaetano (red card) 90+7'	Stadium: Stadio Olimpico; Attendance: 67,279; Referee: Andrea Colombo

14 September 2026 4	Torino	0–2	Roma	Turin
18:30 CEST (UTC+2)		Report	Malen 40'; Hermoso (yellow card) 61'; Pisilli 90+3', (yellow card) 72'	Stadium: Stadio Olimpico Grande Torino; Attendance: 21,294; Referee: Fabio Maresca

19 September 2026 5	Roma	2–2	Internazionale	Rome
18:00 CEST (UTC+2)	Koné 6', 37'; Ndicka (yellow card) 73'; Koulierakis (yellow card) 82'; Ghilardi (yellow card) 89'	Report	Barella (yellow card) 11'; Akanji (yellow card) 45+4'; L. Martínez 46', 79'; Bastoni (yellow card) 57'	Stadium: Stadio Olimpico; Attendance: 66,241; Referee: Davide Massa

11 October 2026 6	Como	0–0	Roma	Como
12:30 CEST (UTC+2)	Diao (yellow card) 45+2'; Baturina (yellow card) 90'	Report	de Roon (yellow card) 46'; Malen (red card) 53'; Koné (yellow card) 57'; Soulé (yellow card) 62'	Stadium: Stadio Giuseppe Sinigaglia; Attendance: 12,415; Referee: Michael Fabbri

17 October 2026 7	Roma	2–0	Genoa	Rome
20:45 CEST (UTC+2)	Soulé (yellow card) 43'; Castro 50'; Lulli 68'; Pisilli (yellow card) 77'	Report	Vásquez (yellow card) 52'; Østigård (yellow card) 65'; Ellertsson (yellow card) 81'	Stadium: Stadio Olimpico; Attendance: 66,797; Referee: Rosario Abisso

24 October 2026 8	Napoli	3–3	Roma	Naples
18:00 CEST (UTC+2)	Marín (yellow card) 4'; Anguissa 28'; McTominay 48', 83'	Report	Cristante (yellow card) 30'; Rensch (yellow card) 45'; Balerdi (yellow card) 61', (goal) 74', 89'; Soulé 69'; de Roon (yellow card) 86'	Stadium: Stadio Diego Armando Maradona; Attendance: 42,000; Referee: Andrea Colombo

27 October 2026 9	Roma	4–2	Cagliari	Rome
20:45 CET (UTC+1)	Lulli 15'; Pisilli 21'; Mora 85'; Malen 87'	Report	Nzola 10' (pen.); Maldini 81'; Rodríguez (yellow card) 90+4'	Stadium: Stadio Olimpico; Attendance: 61,780; Referee: Ermanno Feliciani

31 October 2026 10	Udinese	2–5	Roma	Udine
18:00 CET (UTC+1)	Miller (yellow card) 23'; Zaniolo 50'; Palma 78'	Report	Cristante 10', (yellow card) 60'; Mora 31'; Malen 33'; Ndicka 37'; Ghilardi 90+2'	Stadium: Stadio Friuli; Attendance: 24,824; Referee: Fabio Maresca

7 November 2026 11	Roma	3–0	Sassuolo	Rome
20:45 CET (UTC+1)	Hermoso 27'; Walukiewicz 30' (o.g.); Mora 58'	Report		Stadium: Stadio Olimpico; Attendance: 64,674; Referee: Marco Di Bello

21 November 2026 12	Parma	1–5	Roma	Parma
18:00 CET (UTC+1)	Valeri (yellow card) 44'; Elphege 54'	Report	Malen 39', 68', 77', 90'; Mora 71'	Stadium: Stadio Ennio Tardini; Attendance: 21,049; Referee: Simone Sozza

29 November 2026 13	Roma	v	Monza	Rome
18:00 CET (UTC+1)		Report		Stadium: Stadio Olimpico

4 December 2026 14	Bologna	v	Roma	Bologna
20:45 CET (UTC+1)		Report		Stadium: Stadio Renato Dall'Ara

13 December 2026 15	Lazio	v	Roma	Rome
12:30 CET (UTC+1)		Report		Stadium: Stadio Olimpico

19 December 2026 16	Roma	v	Juventus	Rome
20:45 CET (UTC+1)		Report		Stadium: Stadio Olimpico

2 January 2027 17	Roma	v	Frosinone	Rome
18:00 CET (UTC+1)		Report		Stadium: Stadio Olimpico

5 January 2027 18	Venezia	v	Roma	Venice
18:30 CET (UTC+1)		Report		Stadium: Stadio Pier Luigi Penzo

9 January 2027 19	Roma	v	Milan	Rome
18:00 CET (UTC+1)		Report		Stadium: Stadio Olimpico

16 January 2027 20	Atalanta	v	Roma	Bergamo
--:-- CET (UTC+1)		Report		Stadium: Gewiss Stadium

23 January 2027 21	Roma	v	Udinese	Rome
--:-- CET (UTC+1)		Report		Stadium: Stadio Olimpico

30 January 2027 22	Monza	v	Roma	Monza
--:-- CET (UTC+1)		Report		Stadium: Stadio Brianteo

6 February 2027 23	Roma	v	Torino	Rome
--:-- CET (UTC+1)		Report		Stadium: Stadio Olimpico

13 February 2027 24	Roma	v	Parma	Rome
--:-- CET (UTC+1)		Report		Stadium: Stadio Olimpico

20 February 2027 25	Sassuolo	v	Roma	Reggio Emilia
--:-- CET (UTC+1)		Report		Stadium: Mapei Stadium – Città del Tricolore

27 February 2027 26	Roma	v	Venezia	Rome
--:-- CET (UTC+1)		Report		Stadium: Stadio Olimpico

6 March 2027 27	Juventus	v	Roma	Turin
--:-- CET (UTC+1)		Report		Stadium: Juventus Stadium

13 March 2027 28	Genoa	v	Roma	Genoa
--:-- CET (UTC+1)		Report		Stadium: Stadio Luigi Ferraris

20 March 2027 29	Roma	v	Lecce	Rome
--:-- CET (UTC+1)		Report		Stadium: Stadio Olimpico

3 April 2027 30	Roma	v	Bologna	Rome
--:-- CEST (UTC+2)		Report		Stadium: Stadio Olimpico

10 April 2027 31	Internazionale	v	Roma	Milan
--:-- CEST (UTC+2)		Report		Stadium: San Siro

17 April 2027 32	Roma	v	Lazio	Rome
--:-- CEST (UTC+2)		Report		Stadium: Stadio Olimpico

24 April 2027 33	Frosinone	v	Roma	Frosinone
--:-- CEST (UTC+2)		Report		Stadium: Stadio Benito Stirpe

1 May 2027 34	Roma	v	Napoli	Rome
--:-- CEST (UTC+2)		Report		Stadium: Stadio Olimpico

8 May 2027 35	Fiorentina	v	Roma	Florence
--:-- CEST (UTC+2)		Report		Stadium: Stadio Artemio Franchi

15 May 2027 36	Milan	v	Roma	Milan
--:-- CEST (UTC+2)		Report		Stadium: San Siro

22 May 2027 37	Roma	v	Como	Rome
--:-- CEST (UTC+2)		Report		Stadium: Stadio Olimpico

29 May 2027 38	Cagliari	v	Roma	Cagliari
--:-- CEST (UTC+2)		Report		Stadium: Unipol Domus

=== Coppa Italia ===
12 January 2027 Round of 16	Roma	v	Hellas Verona	Rome
21:00 CET (UTC+1)		Report		Stadium: Stadio Olimpico

=== UEFA Champions League ===
==== League phase ====
The draw for the league phase was held on 27 August 2026.

Pos	Team	Pld	W	D	L	GF	GA	GD	Pts	Qualification
18	(Turkey) Galatasaray	4	2	0	2	8	9	−1	6	Advance to knockout phase play-offs (unseeded)
19	(Turkey) Fenerbahçe	4	1	2	1	6	11	−5	5	Advance to knockout phase play-offs (unseeded)
20	(Italy) Roma	4	1	1	2	10	8	+2	4	Advance to knockout phase play-offs (unseeded)
21	(Ukraine) Shakhtar Donetsk	4	1	1	2	4	4	0	4	Advance to knockout phase play-offs (unseeded)
22	(Norway) Viking	4	1	1	2	9	10	−1	4	Advance to knockout phase play-offs (unseeded)

Updated to match(es) played on 4 November 2026. Source: UEFA
Rules for classification: League phase tiebreakers

Round	1	2	3	4	5	6	7	8
Ground	A	H	H	A	A	H	A	H
Result	D	L	W	L				
Position	17	25	15	20				

Updated to match(es) played on 3 November 2026. Source: UEFA
A = Away; H = Home; W = Win; D = Draw; L = Loss

10 September 2026 1	Fenerbahçe (Turkey)	1–1	(Italy) Roma	Istanbul, Turkey
19:45 TRT (UTC+3)	Brown 48', (yellow card) 51'; Aktürkoğlu (yellow card) 69'; Müldür (yellow card) 71'; Yüksek (yellow card) 84'	Report	Cristante 39', (yellow card) 86'; Rensch (yellow card) 47'	Stadium: Şükrü Saracoğlu Stadium; Attendance: 40,577; Referee: Jesús Gil Manzano (Spain)

14 October 2026 2	Roma (Italy)	3–4	(Spain) Real Madrid	Rome, Italy
21:00 CEST (UTC+2)	de Roon 20'; Malen 51', 57'; Mancini (yellow card) 60'; Wesley (yellow card) 69'; Pellegrini (yellow card) 89'	Report	Mbappé 25'; Espí 82'; Endrick 85'; Rüdiger 90'; Carreras (yellow card) 90+4'	Stadium: Stadio Olimpico; Attendance: 64,256; Referee: François Letexier (France)

20 October 2026 3	Roma (Italy)	4–0	(Slovakia) Slovan Bratislava	Rome, Italy
21:00 CEST (UTC+2)	Hermoso 21'; Molina 39'; Pisilli 52'; Malen 58' (pen.)	Report	Barseghyan (yellow card) 20'; Camara (yellow card) 65'; Martínez (yellow card) 75'	Stadium: Stadio Olimpico; Attendance: 64,399; Referee: Sandro Schärer (Switzerland)

3 November 2026 4	Manchester United (England)	3–2	(Italy) Roma	Manchester, England
20:00 GMT (UTC+0)	Fernandes (yellow card) 20', (goal) 58' (pen.); Heaven (yellow card) 70'; Maguire (yellow card) 78'; Cunha 83', 86', (yellow card) 87' (yellow-red card) 90+1'	Report	Soulé 11', (yellow card) 20'; Malen 17' (pen.), (yellow card) 42'; Lulli (yellow card) 35'	Stadium: Old Trafford; Attendance: 73,747; Referee: Jesús Gil Manzano (Spain)

25 November 2026 5	Paris Saint-Germain (France)	v	(Italy) Roma	Paris, France
21:00 CET (UTC+1)		Report		Stadium: Parc des Princes

8 December 2026 6	Roma (Italy)	v	(Portugal) Sporting CP	Rome, Italy
21:00 CET (UTC+1)		Report		Stadium: Stadio Olimpico

19 January 2027 7	AEK Athens (Greece)	v	(Italy) Roma	Athens, Greece
22:00 EET (UTC+2)		Report		Stadium: Agia Sophia Stadium

27 January 2027 8	Roma (Italy)	v	(France) Lille	Rome, Italy
21:00 CET (UTC+1)		Report		Stadium: Stadio Olimpico

== Statistics ==
=== Squad statistics ===
No.	Pos	Nat	Player	Total		Serie A		Coppa Italia		Champions League	
No.	Pos	Nat	Player	Apps	Goals	Apps	Goals	Apps	Goals	Apps	Goals
Goalkeepers
32	GK	(Colombia) COL	Devis Vásquez	1	0	0	0	0	0	1	0
70	GK	(United States) USA	Giorgio De Marzi	0	0	0	0	0	0	0	0
95	GK	(Italy) ITA	Pierluigi Gollini	7	0	5	0	0	0	2	0
99	GK	(Serbia) SRB	Mile Svilar	6	0	5	0	0	0	1	0
Defenders
2	DF	(Netherlands) NED	Devyne Rensch	10	0	2+5	0	0	0	2+1	0
3	DF	(Greece) GRE	Konstantinos Koulierakis	7	0	2+3	0	0	0	0+2	0
5	DF	(Ivory Coast) CIV	Evan Ndicka	11	1	7+1	1	0	0	2+1	0
20	DF	(Argentina) ARG	Nahuel Molina	11	1	5+3	0	0	0	2+1	1
22	DF	(Spain) ESP	Mario Hermoso	13	2	8+1	1	0	0	4	1
23	DF	(Italy) ITA	Gianluca Mancini	13	0	8+1	0	0	0	3+1	0
26	DF	(Argentina) ARG	Leonardo Balerdi	10	2	3+3	2	0	0	2+2	0
43	DF	(Brazil) BRA	Wesley	13	0	7+2	0	0	0	4	0
77	DF	(Italy) ITA	Emanuele Lulli	8	2	6+1	2	0	0	0+1	0
87	DF	(Italy) ITA	Daniele Ghilardi	9	1	2+5	1	0	0	1+1	0
Midfielders
4	MF	(Italy) ITA	Bryan Cristante	10	2	8	1	0	0	2	1
7	MF	(Italy) ITA	Lorenzo Pellegrini	4	0	1+1	0	0	0	1+1	0
15	MF	(Netherlands) NED	Marten de Roon	11	1	5+2	0	0	0	3+1	1
17	MF	(France) FRA	Manu Koné	8	2	5+1	2	0	0	2	0
61	MF	(Italy) ITA	Niccolò Pisilli	13	4	4+5	3	0	0	1+3	1
63	MF	(Italy) ITA	Alessandro Di Nunzio	1	0	0+1	0	0	0	0	0
86	MF	(Portugal) POR	Rodrigo Mora	12	3	4+4	3	0	0	2+2	0
Forwards
9	FW	(Argentina) ARG	Santiago Castro	10	1	2+6	1	0	0	0+2	0
14	FW	(Netherlands) NED	Donyell Malen	13	12	8+1	8	0	0	4	4
18	FW	(Argentina) ARG	Matías Soulé	14	4	7+3	3	0	0	3+1	1
21	FW	(Argentina) ARG	Paulo Dybala	8	0	6	0	0	0	2	0
68	FW	(Italy) ITA	Antonio Arena	0	0	0	0	0	0	0	0
Players transferred/loaned out during the season
8	MF	(Morocco) MAR	Neil El Aynaoui	1	0	0+1	0	0	0	0	0

Last updated: 3 November 2026
Source: Competitions

=== Goalscorers ===
As of 7 November 2026

Rank	No.	Pos.	Nat.	Player	Serie A	Coppa Italia	Champions League	Total
1	14	FW	(Netherlands)	Donyell Malen	8	0	4	12
2	18	FW	(Argentina)	Matías Soulé	3	0	1	4
2	61	MF	(Italy)	Niccolò Pisilli	3	0	1	4
2	86	MF	(Portugal)	Rodrigo Mora	4	0	0	4
5	22	DF	(Spain)	Mario Hermoso	2	0	1	3
6	4	MF	(Italy)	Bryan Cristante	1	0	1	2
6	17	MF	(France)	Manu Koné	2	0	0	2
6	26	DF	(Argentina)	Leonardo Balerdi	2	0	0	2
6	77	DF	(Italy)	Emanuele Lulli	2	0	0	2
10	5	DF	(Ivory Coast)	Evan Ndicka	1	0	0	1
10	9	FW	(Argentina)	Santiago Castro	1	0	0	1
10	15	MF	(Netherlands)	Marten de Roon	0	0	1	1
10	20	DF	(Argentina)	Nahuel Molina	0	0	1	1
10	87	DF	(Italy)	Daniele Ghilardi	1	0	0	1
Own goals					1	0	0	1
Totals					31	0	10	41
