= Emanuele Lulli =

Italian footballer (born 2007)

Personal information
- Date of birth: 17 August 2007 (age 19)
- Place of birth: Palestrina, Italy
- Height: 1.84 m (6 ft 0 in)
- Positions: Right-back; right wing-back

Team information
- Current team: Roma
- Number: 77

Youth career
- Palestrina
- Tre Teste
- 2021–2026: Roma

Senior career*
Years	Team	Apps	(Gls)
2026–	Roma	8	(2)

International career^{‡}
2025	Italy U19	2	(0)
2026–	Italy U21	2	(0)
- * Club domestic league appearances and goals as of 22:26, 21 November 2026 (UTC) ‡ National team caps and goals as of 23:45, 16 November 2026 (UTC)

Emanuele Lulli (born 17 August 2007) is an Italian professional footballer who plays as a right-back for Serie A club Roma.

== Club career ==
Born in Palestrina, in the Metropolitan City of Rome, where he grew up as an AS Roma supporter, Lulli first played with the club in his hometown where he was part of a promising generation beating the likes of Lazio and Roma academies in youth tournaments. He then played for the club from Tor Tre Teste, before joining the Roma Youth Sector in 2021.

There he first stood out with the team that won the Campionato under-16 in 2023 against Fiorentina, and the under-17 the following year.

In September 2024, he signed his first professional contract with Roma. During the following season, Lulli became a standout with the under-18 Rome team.

During the 2025–26 pre-season, he made his unofficial first team debut under newly arrived manager Gian Piero Gasperini, during a friendly against Neom. Since early 2026 he started to regularly feature on the bench as an unused substitute in Serie A, Coppa Italia and Europa League.

Meanwhile Primavera coach Federico Guidi made him a central piece of the under-20 team, along the likes of Muhammed Bah, Antonio Arena and Federico Nardin.

For the 2026–27 season, after playing as a protagonist in the summer friendlies, Gasperini announced Lulli would enter the first team roster on a definitive basis.

Lulli made his professional debut with Roma in a 4–0 Serie A win over Fiorentina on 24 August 2026, starting as a right-back, ahead of newly signed Nahuel Molina. Against a team that had just been through an impressive transfer window, the young defender was lauded for his performance, helping maintain a clean sheet until the last minute. Lulli scored his first professional goal during a home game against Genoa in the 68th minute. Roma went on to win that game 2-0.

== International career ==
Lulli is a youth international for Italy, having played for the under-19 since 2025.

He made is debut with the Italy U21 on 1 October 2026, in the 2027 Euro qualifying match won 1-0 against Armenia.

== Style of play ==
First raised as a midfielder, Emanuele Lulli broke through Roma first team as a technically gifted right-back, described as an astute and explosive player, with good aerial and physical presence.

A right-footed player also good with his left foot, helping his remarked dribbling abilities, he is able to play both as a full-back or a wing-back.

His profile and precocious debuts drew comparison with Italy international Marco Palestra.

== Career statistics ==
=== Club ===
As of match played 21 November 2026

Appearances and goals by club, season and competition
Club	Season	League			National cup (Note: Includes Coppa Italia)		Europe		Total	
Club	Season	Division	Apps	Goals	Apps	Goals	Apps	Goals	Apps	Goals
Roma	2026–27	Serie A	8	2	0	0	1 (Note: Appearance in UEFA Champions League)	0	9	2
Career total			8	2	0	0	1	0	9	2

== Honours ==
AS Roma

- Campionato Nazionale Under-16: 2022–23
- Campionato Nazionale Under-17: 2023–24
- Campionato Nazionale Under-18 runner-up: 2024–25
