= 2024–25 AS Roma season =

Roma
2024–25 season
- Owner: The Friedkin Group
- President: Dan Friedkin
- Head coach: Daniele De Rossi (until 18 September); Ivan Jurić (from 18 September to 10 November); Claudio Ranieri (from 14 November)
- Stadium: Stadio Olimpico
- Serie A: 5th
- Coppa Italia: Quarter-finals
- UEFA Europa League: Round of 16
- Top goalscorer: League: Artem Dovbyk (12); All: Artem Dovbyk (17)
- Highest home attendance: 67,517 vs Empoli; 25 August 2024 (Serie A)
- Lowest home attendance: 55,286 vs Porto; 20 February 2025 (UEFA Europa League)
- Average home league attendance: 62,758
- Biggest win: 5–0 vs Parma (H); 22 December 2024 (Serie A)
- Biggest defeat: 1–5 vs Fiorentina (A); 27 October 2024 (Serie A)
Home colours	Away colours	Third colours

The 2024–25 season was the 98th season in the history of Associazione Sportiva Roma, and the club's 73rd consecutive season in the Italian top flight. In addition to the domestic league, the club participated in the Coppa Italia and the UEFA Europa League.

== Squad information ==
As of 25 May 2025

No.	Player	Nat.	Position(s)	Date of birth (age)	Signed from	Signed in	Contract ends	Apps.	Goals
Goalkeepers
89	Renato Marin	(Italy)	GK	10 July 2006 (aged 18)	(Italy) Roma Primavera	2023	2025	0	0
95	Pierluigi Gollini	(Italy)	GK	18 March 1995 (aged 30)	(Italy) Atalanta	2025	2027	0	0
99	Mile Svilar	(Serbia)	GK	27 August 1999 (aged 25)	(Portugal) Benfica	2022	2027	85	0
Defenders
2	Devyne Rensch	(Netherlands)	RB / CB	18 January 2003 (aged 22)	(Netherlands) Ajax	2025	2029	18	0
3	Angeliño	(Spain)	LB / LWB	4 January 1997 (aged 28)	(Germany) RB Leipzig	2024	2028	71	4
5	Evan Ndicka	(Ivory Coast)	CB / LB	20 August 1999 (aged 25)	(Germany) Eintracht Frankfurt	2023	2028	85	1
12	Saud Abdulhamid	(Saudi Arabia)	RB	18 July 1999 (aged 25)	(Saudi Arabia) Al-Hilal	2024	2028	8	1
15	Mats Hummels	(Germany)	CB	16 December 1988 (aged 36)	(Germany) Borussia Dortmund	2024	2025	20	1
19	Zeki Çelik	(Turkey)	RB / RWB	17 February 1997 (aged 28)	(France) Lille	2022	2026	106	1
23	Gianluca Mancini (vc)	(Italy)	CB	17 April 1996 (aged 29)	(Italy) Atalanta	2019	2027	274	18
25	Victor Nelsson	(Denmark)	CB	14 October 1998 (aged 26)	(Turkey) Galatasaray (loan)	2025	2025	5	0
34	Anass Salah-Eddine	(Netherlands)	LB	18 January 2002 (aged 23)	(Netherlands) Twente	2025	2028	3	0
Midfielders
4	Bryan Cristante	(Italy)	DM / CM	3 March 1995 (aged 30)	(Italy) Atalanta	2018	2027	318	19
7	Lorenzo Pellegrini (c)	(Italy)	AM / CM	19 June 1996 (aged 29)	(Italy) Sassuolo	2017	2026	314	55
16	Leandro Paredes	(Argentina)	DM / CM	29 June 1994 (aged 31)	(France) Paris Saint-Germain	2023	2025	135	13
17	Manu Koné	(France)	CM / DM	17 May 2001 (aged 24)	(Germany) Borussia Mönchengladbach (loan)	2024	2025	45	2
27	Lucas Gourna-Douath	(France)	DM	5 August 2003 (aged 21)	(Austria) Red Bull Salzburg (loan)	2025	2025	6	0
35	Tommaso Baldanzi	(Italy)	AM	23 March 2003 (aged 22)	(Italy) Empoli	2024	2029	59	2
61	Niccolò Pisilli	(Italy)	CM	23 September 2004 (aged 20)	(Italy) Roma Primavera	2023	2026	44	4
Forwards
11	Artem Dovbyk	(Ukraine)	CF	21 June 1997 (aged 28)	(Spain) Girona	2024	2029	45	17
14	Eldor Shomurodov	(Uzbekistan)	CF	29 June 1995 (aged 30)	(Italy) Genoa	2021	2026	85	13
18	Matías Soulé	(Argentina)	RW / AM	15 April 2003 (aged 22)	(Italy) Juventus	2024	2029	39	5
21	Paulo Dybala	(Argentina)	CF / AM	15 November 1993 (aged 31)	(Italy) Juventus	2022	2025	113	42
56	Alexis Saelemaekers	(Belgium)	RW / LW	27 June 1999 (aged 26)	(Italy) Milan (loan)	2024	2025	31	7
92	Stephan El Shaarawy	(Italy)	LW / AM / LM	27 October 1992 (aged 32)	(China) Shanghai Shenhua	2021	2025	320	64

=== Out on loan ===
Note: Flags indicate national team as defined under FIFA eligibility rules; some limited exceptions apply. Players may hold more than one non-FIFA nationality.

No.	Pos.	Nation	Player
8	MF	ITA	Edoardo Bove (at Fiorentina until 30 June 2025)
9	FW	ENG	Tammy Abraham (at Milan until 30 June 2025)
20	FW	NOR	Ola Solbakken (at Empoli until 30 June 2025)
22	DF	ESP	Mario Hermoso (at Bayer Leverkusen until 30 June 2025)
24	DF	ALB	Marash Kumbulla (at Espanyol until 30 June 2025)
26	DF	SWE	Samuel Dahl (at Benfica until 30 June 2025)
28	MF	FRA	Enzo Le Fée (at Sunderland until 30 June 2025)
55	MF	GAM	Ebrima Darboe (at Frosinone until 30 June 2025)

No.	Pos.	Nation	Player
59	MF	POL	Nicola Zalewski (at Internazionale until 30 June 2025)
—	GK	ITA	Davide Mastrantonio (at Triestina until 30 June 2025)
—	DF	ESP	Jan Oliveras (at Dinamo Zagreb until 30 June 2025)
—	DF	ITA	Matteo Plaia (at Perugia until 30 June 2025)
—	DF	ITA	William Feola (at Como until 30 June 2025)
—	MF	ITA	Riccardo Pagano (at Catanzaro until 30 June 2025)
—	FW	ITA	Luigi Cherubini (at Carrarese until 30 June 2025)
—	FW	ITA	Manuel Nardozi (at Parma until 30 June 2025)

== Transfers ==
=== Summer window ===
==== In ====
Date	Pos.	Player	From	Fee	Notes	Ref.
30 June 2024	FW	(Uzbekistan) Eldor Shomurodov	(Italy) Cagliari	Loan return		
1 July 2024	DF	(Spain) Angeliño	(Germany) RB Leipzig	€5,200,000	Loan transfer made permanent	
1 July 2024	DF	(Spain) Buba Sangaré	(Spain) Levante	€1,500,000		
10 July 2024	MF	(France) Enzo Le Fée	(France) Rennes	€23,000,000		
17 July 2024	GK	(Australia) Mathew Ryan	(Netherlands) AZ	Free		
28 July 2024	DF	(Sweden) Samuel Dahl	(Sweden) Djurgårdens IF	€4,300,000		
30 July 2024	FW	(Argentina) Matías Soulé	(Italy) Juventus	€25,600,000		
2 August 2024	FW	(Ukraine) Artem Dovbyk	(Spain) Girona	€30,500,000		
27 August 2024	DF	(Saudi Arabia) Saud Abdulhamid	(Saudi Arabia) Al Hilal	€2,500,000		
2 September 2024	DF	(Spain) Mario Hermoso	(Spain) Atlético Madrid	Free		
4 September 2024	DF	(Germany) Mats Hummels	(Germany) Borussia Dortmund	Free		

==== Loans in ====
Date	Pos.	Player	From	Fee	Notes	Ref.
30 August 2024	FW	(Belgium) Alexis Saelemaekers	(Italy) Milan	Free		
30 August 2024	MF	(France) Manu Koné	(Germany) Borussia Mönchengladbach	Free	Obligation to buy for €18,000,000	

==== Out ====
Date	Pos.	Player	To	Fee	Notes	Ref.
30 June 2024	FW	(Iran) Sardar Azmoun	(Germany) Bayer Leverkusen	End of loan		
30 June 2024	DF	(Spain) Dean Huijsen	(Italy) Juventus	End of loan		
30 June 2024	DF	(Denmark) Rasmus Kristensen	(England) Leeds United	End of loan		
30 June 2024	DF	(Spain) Diego Llorente	(England) Leeds United	End of loan		
30 June 2024	FW	(Belgium) Romelu Lukaku	(England) Chelsea	End of loan		
30 June 2024	MF	(Portugal) Renato Sanches	(France) Paris Saint-Germain	End of loan		
1 July 2024	GK	(Portugal) Rui Patrício	(Italy) Atalanta	Free	End of contract	
1 July 2024	DF	(Italy) Leonardo Spinazzola	(Italy) Napoli	Free	End of contract	
1 July 2024	MF	(Italy) Francesco D'Alessio	(Italy) Cittadella	Free		
1 July 2024	FW	(Italy) Andrea Belotti	(Italy) Como	€4,500,000		
17 July 2024	MF	(Algeria) Houssem Aouar	(Saudi Arabia) Al-Ittihad	€12,000,000		
22 July 2024	DF	(Italy) Francesco Chesti	(Italy) Pianese	Undisclosed	From Primavera squad	
1 August 2024	GK	(Latvia) Vladislavs Razumejevs	(Netherlands) Dordrecht	Undisclosed	From Primavera squad	
3 August 2024	FW	(Italy) Lorenzo Bauco	(Italy) Sora	Undisclosed	From Primavera squad	
5 August 2024	GK	(Italy) Pietro Boer	(Italy) Pianese	Undisclosed		
20 August 2024	MF	(Estonia) Martin Vetkal	(Sweden) IF Brommapojkarna	Undisclosed	From Primavera squad	
29 August 2024	DF	(Netherlands) Rick Karsdorp	(Netherlands) PSV Eindhoven	Free	Contract terminated	
2 September 2024	FW	(Portugal) João Costa	(Saudi Arabia) Al-Ettifaq	€9,000,000		
2 September 2024	DF	(England) Chris Smalling	(Saudi Arabia) Al-Fayha	Free		

==== Loans out ====
Date	Pos.	Player	To	Fee	Notes	Ref.
26 July 2024	MF	(Italy) Riccardo Pagano	(Italy) Catanzaro	Free	Option to buy for €2,000,000, buy-back option for €2,400,000	
27 July 2024	FW	(Italy) Luigi Cherubini	(Italy) Carrarese	Free		
1 August 2024	GK	(Italy) Davide Mastrantonio	(Italy) Milan Futuro	Free	Option to buy for €150,000, buy-back option for €300,000	
12 August 2024	MF	(The Gambia) Ebrima Darboe	(Italy) Frosinone	Free	Option to buy for an undisclosed fee, obligation to buy under certain conditions	
14 August 2024	FW	(Norway) Ola Solbakken	(Italy) Empoli	Free	Option to buy for €3,500,000	
14 August 2024	DF	(Spain) Jan Oliveras	(Croatia) Dinamo Zagreb	Free	From Primavera squad, option to buy for €1,500,000	
14 August 2024	DF	(Italy) Matteo Plaia	(Italy) Perugia	Free	From Primavera squad	
17 August 2024	DF	(Albania) Marash Kumbulla	(Spain) Espanyol	Free	Option to buy for €6,500,000	
30 August 2024	FW	(England) Tammy Abraham	(Italy) Milan	€1,500,000		
30 August 2024	MF	(Italy) Edoardo Bove	(Italy) Fiorentina	€1,500,000	Option to buy for €11,000,000, obligation to buy under certain conditions	
30 August 2024	DF	(Italy) William Feola	(Italy) Como	Free	From Primavera squad, option to buy for an undisclosed fee	
30 August 2024	FW	(Italy) Manuel Nardozi	(Italy) Parma	Free	From Primavera squad, option to buy for an undisclosed fee	

=== Winter window ===
==== In ====
Date	Pos.	Player	From	Fee	Notes	Ref.
23 January 2025	DF	(Netherlands) Devyne Rensch	(Netherlands) Ajax	€5,000,000		
24 January 2025	GK	(Italy) Pierluigi Gollini	(Italy) Atalanta	€800,000		
29 January 2025	GK	(Italy) Davide Mastrantonio	(Italy) Milan Futuro	Free	Loan terminated early	
3 February 2025	DF	(Netherlands) Anass Salah-Eddine	(Netherlands) Twente	€8,500,000		

==== Loans in ====
Date	Pos.	Player	From	Fee	Notes	Ref.
3 February 2025	DF	(Denmark) Victor Nelsson	(Turkey) Galatasaray	€500,000	Option to buy for €10,000,000	
3 February 2025	MF	(France) Lucas Gourna-Douath	(Austria) Red Bull Salzburg	Free	Option to buy for €18,000,000	

==== Out ====
Date	Pos.	Player	To	Fee	Notes	Ref.
21 January 2025	GK	(Australia) Mathew Ryan	(France) Lens	€800,000		

==== Loans out ====
Date	Pos.	Player	To	Fee	Notes	Ref.
10 January 2025	MF	(France) Enzo Le Fée	(England) Sunderland	Free	Option to buy for €24,000,000, obligation to buy under certain conditions	
30 January 2025	GK	(Italy) Davide Mastrantonio	(Italy) Triestina	Free		
31 January 2025	DF	(Spain) Mario Hermoso	(Germany) Bayer Leverkusen	Free	Option to buy for an undisclosed fee	
1 February 2025	MF	(Poland) Nicola Zalewski	(Italy) Internazionale	€600,000	Option to buy for €6,000,000	
3 February 2025	DF	(Sweden) Samuel Dahl	(Portugal) Benfica	€600,000	Option to buy for €8,000,000	

== Friendlies ==
=== Pre-season ===
17 July 2024 Friendly	Roma (Italy)	6–1	(Italy) Latina	Rome, Italy
18:00 CEST (UTC+2)	Dybala 28' (pen.); Solbakken 30' (pen.); Pisilli 40'; Le Fée 43'; Graziani 64', 83'	Report	Capanni 20'	Stadium: Fulvio Bernardini Training Center; Attendance: 0

22 July 2024 Friendly	Košice (Slovakia)	1–1	(Italy) Roma	Košice, Slovakia
19:30 CEST (UTC+2)	Takáč 53'	Report	Pisilli 85'	Stadium: Košická futbalová aréna Referee: Erik Gemzický (Slovakia)

27 July 2024 Friendly	Roma (Italy)	0–1	(France) Toulouse	Rome, Italy
18:00 CEST (UTC+2)		Report	Gboho 35'	Stadium: Fulvio Bernardini Training Center

3 August 2024 Friendly	Roma (Italy)	1–1	(Greece) Olympiacos	Rieti, Italy
17:00 CEST (UTC+2)	Pellegrini 17' (pen.); Le Fée (yellow card) 62'; Sangaré (yellow card) 89'	Report	Rodinei 22' (pen.); Biancone (yellow card) 78'; Biel (yellow card) 81'	Stadium: Stadio Centro d'Italia; Referee: Ermanno Feliciani (Italy)

6 August 2024 Friendly	Barnsley (England)	0–4	(Italy) Roma	Burton upon Trent, England
17:00 BST (UTC+1)	Yoganathan (yellow card) 63'	Report	Le Fée 2'; Pisilli 65'; Dybala 68'; Soulé 83'	Stadium: St George's Park; Referee: Tom Reeves (England)

10 August 2024 Friendly	Everton (England)	1–1	(Italy) Roma	Liverpool, England
17:00 BST (UTC+1)	Calvert-Lewin 61'	Report	Pellegrini 39'	Stadium: Goodison Park; Attendance: 31,324; Referee: Michael Salisbury (England)

== Competitions ==
=== Overall record ===
Competition	First match	Last match	Starting round	Final position	Record							
Competition	First match	Last match	Starting round	Final position	Pld	W	D	L	GF	GA	GD	Win %
Serie A	18 August 2024	25 May 2025	Matchday 1	5th	38	20	9	9	56	35	+21	52.63
Coppa Italia	18 December 2024	5 February 2025	Round of 16	Quarter-finals	2	1	0	1	5	4	+1	50.00
UEFA Europa League	26 September 2024	13 March 2025	League phase	Round of 16	12	5	4	3	17	13	+4	41.67
Total					52	26	13	13	78	52	+26	50.00

Source: Soccerway

=== Serie A ===
==== League table ====
Pos	Team	Pld	W	D	L	GF	GA	GD	Pts	Qualification or relegation
3	Atalanta	38	22	8	8	78	37	+41	74	Qualification for the Champions League league phase
4	Juventus	38	18	16	4	58	35	+23	70	Qualification for the Champions League league phase
5	Roma	38	20	9	9	56	35	+21	69	Qualification for the Europa League league phase
6	Fiorentina	38	19	8	11	60	41	+19	65 (Note: Fiorentina finished ahead of Lazio on head-to-head points: Fiorentina 2–1 Lazio, Lazio 1–2 Fiorentina.)	Qualification for the Conference League play-off round
7	Lazio	38	18	11	9	61	49	+12	65	

Source: Serie A
Rules for classification: 1) Points; 2) Tiebreaker for Champions team and third relegated team; 3) Head-to-head points; 4) Head-to-head goal difference; 5) Goal difference; 6) Goals scored; 7) Draw.
(Note: Head-to-head record is used only after all the matches between the teams in question have been played)

==== Results summary ====
Overall								Home						Away					
Pld	W	D	L	GF	GA	GD	Pts	W	D	L	GF	GA	GD	W	D	L	GF	GA	GD
38	20	9	9	56	35	+21	69	13	2	4	37	15	+22	7	7	5	19	20	−1

Source: Serie A

==== Results by round ====
Round	1	2	3	4	5	6	7	8	9	10	11	12	13	14	15	16	17	18	19	20	21	22	23	24	25	26	27	28	29	30	31	32	33	34	35	36	37	38
Ground	A	H	A	A	H	H	A	H	A	H	A	H	A	H	H	A	H	A	H	A	H	A	H	A	A	H	H	A	H	A	H	A	H	A	H	A	H	A
Result	D	L	D	D	W	W	D	L	L	W	L	L	L	L	W	L	W	D	W	D	W	W	D	W	W	W	W	W	W	W	D	D	W	W	W	L	W	W
Position	16	15	17	16	9	9	9	10	11	10	12	12	12	15	11	12	10	10	10	10	9	9	9	9	9	9	8	7	7	6	7	7	7	6	5	6	5	5

Source: Serie A
A = Away; H = Home; W = Win; D = Draw; L = Loss

==== Matches ====
The match schedule was released on 4 July 2024.

18 August 2024 1	Cagliari	0–0	Roma	Cagliari
20:45 CEST (UTC+2)	Deiola (yellow card) 84'; Azzi (yellow card) 90+2'	Report		Stadium: Unipol Domus; Attendance: 16,261; Referee: Livio Marinelli

25 August 2024 2	Roma	1–2	Empoli	Rome
20:45 CEST (UTC+2)	Shomurodov 80'	Report	Maleh (yellow card) 26'; Gyasi 45'; Solbakken (yellow card) 58'; Colombo 61' (pen.); Cacace (yellow card) 84'	Stadium: Stadio Olimpico; Attendance: 67,517; Referee: Luca Zufferli

1 September 2024 3	Juventus	0–0	Roma	Turin
20:45 CEST (UTC+2)	Fagioli (yellow card) 2'; Bremer (yellow card) 85'	Report	Saelemaekers (yellow card) 44'; Mancini (yellow card) 85'	Stadium: Juventus Stadium; Attendance: 41,375; Referee: Marco Guida

15 September 2024 4	Genoa	1–1	Roma	Genoa
12:30 CEST (UTC+2)	De Winter (yellow card) 70', (goal) 90+6'	Report	Dovbyk 37'; Pisilli (yellow card) 45'; Pellegrini (yellow card) 65'; Shomurodov (yellow card) 90+1'	Stadium: Stadio Luigi Ferraris; Attendance: 33,009; Referee: Antonio Giua

22 September 2024 5	Roma	3–0	Udinese	Rome
18:00 CEST (UTC+2)	Dovbyk 19'; Pisilli (yellow card) 31'; Dybala 49' (pen.); Baldanzi 70'; Cristante (yellow card) 80'	Report	Lucca (yellow card) 3'; Kristensen (yellow card) 39'	Stadium: Stadio Olimpico; Attendance: 63,499; Referee: Ermanno Feliciani

29 September 2024 6	Roma	2–1	Venezia	Rome
15:00 CEST (UTC+2)	Cristante 74', (yellow card) 90'; Pisilli 83'	Report	Idzes (yellow card) 39'; Pohjanpalo 44'; Candela (yellow card) 67'	Stadium: Stadio Olimpico; Attendance: 62,165; Referee: Rosario Abisso

6 October 2024 7	Monza	1–1	Roma	Monza
18:00 CEST (UTC+2)	Kyriakopoulos (yellow card) 60'; Mota 70'; Đurić (yellow card) 90+1'; D'Ambrosio (yellow card) 90+3'	Report	Soulé (yellow card) 26'; Dovbyk 61'	Stadium: Stadio Brianteo; Attendance: 12,021; Referee: Federico La Penna

20 October 2024 8	Roma	0–1	Internazionale	Rome
20:45 CEST (UTC+2)	Cristante (yellow card) 49'; Pisilli (yellow card) 62'	Report	Barella (yellow card) 48'; L. Martínez 60'; Darmian (yellow card) 68'; Correa (yellow card) 78'	Stadium: Stadio Olimpico; Attendance: 64,199; Referee: Davide Massa

27 October 2024 9	Fiorentina	5–1	Roma	Florence
20:45 CET (UTC+1)	Kean 9', 41', (yellow card) 74'; Beltrán 17' (pen.); Bove 52'; Ranieri (yellow card) 61'; Hummels 71' (o.g.)	Report	Koné 39', (yellow card) 57'; Mancini (yellow card) 42'; Pisilli (yellow card) 50'; Hermoso (yellow card) 60' (yellow-red card) 65'	Stadium: Stadio Artemio Franchi; Attendance: 20,440; Referee: Simone Sozza

31 October 2024 10	Roma	1–0	Torino	Rome
20:45 CET (UTC+1)	Dybala 20'; Baldanzi (yellow card) 72'; Pellegrini (yellow card) 90+2'	Report	Coco (yellow card) 71'; Masina (yellow card) 86'	Stadium: Stadio Olimpico; Attendance: 60,920; Referee: Michael Fabbri

3 November 2024 11	Hellas Verona	3–2	Roma	Verona
18:00 CET (UTC+1)	Tengstedt 13'; Magnani 34', (yellow card) 80'; Suslov (yellow card) 47'; Harroui 88'; Livramento (red card) 90+5'	Report	Soulé 18'; Svilar (yellow card) 35'; Dovbyk 53'; Koné (yellow card) 80'	Stadium: Stadio Marcantonio Bentegodi; Attendance: 28,185; Referee: Matteo Marcenaro

10 November 2024 12	Roma	2–3	Bologna	Rome
15:00 CET (UTC+1)	El Shaarawy 63', 82', (yellow card) 90+6'; Mancini (yellow card) 87'	Report	Castro 25'; De Silvestri (yellow card) 45'; Orsolini 66'; Miranda (yellow card) 68'; Karlsson 77', (yellow card) 87'	Stadium: Stadio Olimpico; Attendance: 60,681; Referee: Gianluca Manganiello

24 November 2024 13	Napoli	1–0	Roma	Naples
18:00 CET (UTC+1)	Lukaku 54'	Report	Ndicka (yellow card) 38'; Pisilli (yellow card) 60'; Cristante (yellow card) 90+1'	Stadium: Stadio Diego Armando Maradona; Attendance: 51,164; Referee: Davide Massa

2 December 2024 14	Roma	0–2	Atalanta	Rome
20:45 CET (UTC+1)	Dybala (yellow card) 53'; El Shaarawy (yellow card) 90+4'	Report	De Roon 69'; Hien (yellow card) 78'; Kolašinac (yellow card) 88'; Zaniolo 89', (yellow card) 90'	Stadium: Stadio Olimpico; Attendance: 55,772; Referee: Marco Guida

7 December 2024 15	Roma	4–1	Lecce	Rome
20:45 CET (UTC+1)	Saelemaekers (yellow card) 12', (goal) 13'; Mancini 59'; Pisilli 66'; Koné 86', (yellow card) 87'	Report	Krstović 40' (pen.), (yellow card) 69'; Kaba (yellow card) 72'; Oudin (yellow card) 78'	Stadium: Stadio Olimpico; Attendance: 58,213; Referee: Daniele Chiffi

15 December 2024 16	Como	2–0	Roma	Como
18:00 CET (UTC+1)	Goldaniga (yellow card) 45+1'; Belotti (yellow card) 61'; Van Der Brempt (yellow card) 68'; Da Cunha (yellow card) 78'; Kone (yellow card) 90'; Gabrielloni 90+3', (yellow card) 90+6'; Paz 90+7'	Report	Le Fée (yellow card) 55'	Stadium: Stadio Giuseppe Sinigaglia; Attendance: 10,376; Referee: Antonio Rapuano

22 December 2024 17	Roma	5–0	Parma	Rome
12:30 CET (UTC+1)	Dybala 8' (pen.), 51'; Saelemaekers 13'; Angeliño (yellow card) 64'; Paredes 74' (pen.); Dovbyk 83'	Report	Bonny (yellow card) 23'; Almqvist (yellow card) 50'	Stadium: Stadio Olimpico; Attendance: 62,968; Referee: Marco Di Bello

29 December 2024 18	Milan	1–1	Roma	Milan
20:45 CET (UTC+1)	Reijnders 16', (yellow card) 82'; Hernandez (yellow card) 43'; Morata (yellow card) 44'; Gabbia (yellow card) 90+4'	Report	Koné (yellow card) 4'; Hummels (yellow card) 13'; Dybala 23'; Paredes (yellow card) 67'; Çelik (yellow card) 71'	Stadium: San Siro; Attendance: 74,283; Referee: Michael Fabbri

5 January 2025 19	Roma	2–0	Lazio	Rome
20:45 CET (UTC+1)	Pellegrini 10'; Saelemaekers 18', (yellow card) 37'; Dybala (yellow card) 71'; Paredes (yellow card) 78'; Ndicka (yellow card) 90+5'	Report	Gila (yellow card) 32'; Zaccagni (yellow card) 34'; Castellanos (yellow card) 41', (red card) 90+5'; Rovella (yellow card) 54'; Dia (yellow card) 72'	Stadium: Stadio Olimpico; Attendance: 65,042; Referee: Marco Guida

12 January 2025 20	Bologna	2–2	Roma	Bologna
18:00 CET (UTC+1)	Miranda (yellow card) 32'; Dallinga 61', (yellow card) 77'; Ferguson 65' (pen.); Holm (yellow card) 70'; Lucumí (yellow card) 90+5'	Report	Saelemaekers 58'; Mancini (yellow card) 90+4'; Dovbyk 90+8' (pen.)	Stadium: Stadio Renato Dall'Ara; Attendance: 30,226; Referee: Rosario Abisso

17 January 2025 21	Roma	3–1	Genoa	Rome
20:45 CET (UTC+1)	Dovbyk 37'; Paredes (yellow card) 56'; El Shaarawy 60'; Leali 73' (o.g.)	Report	Vásquez (yellow card) 18'; Masini 33'	Stadium: Stadio Olimpico; Attendance: 62,217; Referee: Luca Zufferli

26 January 2025 22	Udinese	1–2	Roma	Udine
15:00 CET (UTC+1)	Lucca 38'; Karlström (yellow card) 52'; Atta (yellow card) 80'	Report	Çelik (yellow card) 21'; Pellegrini (yellow card) 37', (goal) 50' (pen.); Dovbyk 64' (pen.)	Stadium: Stadio Friuli; Attendance: 23,853; Referee: Simone Sozza

2 February 2025 23	Roma	1–1	Napoli	Rome
20:45 CET (UTC+1)	Koné (yellow card) 51'; Pisilli (yellow card) 72'; Angeliño 90+2'	Report	Politano (yellow card) 14'; Spinazzola 29'	Stadium: Stadio Olimpico; Attendance: 60,788; Referee: Michael Fabbri

9 February 2025 24	Venezia	0–1	Roma	Venice
12:30 CET (UTC+1)	Fila (yellow card) 10'; Candé (yellow card) 24'	Report	Gourna-Douath (yellow card) 9'; Dybala 57' (pen.); Cristante (yellow card) 61'; Çelik (yellow card) 69'	Stadium: Stadio Pier Luigi Penzo; Attendance: 9,380; Referee: Luca Zufferli

16 February 2025 25	Parma	0–1	Roma	Parma
18:00 CET (UTC+1)	Leoni (red card) 31'; Balogh (yellow card) 82'; Almqvist (yellow card) 85'	Report	Soulé 33', (yellow card) 34'; Pellegrini (yellow card) 55'; Gourna-Douath (yellow card) 63'	Stadium: Stadio Ennio Tardini; Attendance: 20,559; Referee: Daniele Chiffi

24 February 2025 26	Roma	4–0	Monza	Rome
20:45 CET (UTC+1)	Saelemaekers 10'; Shomurodov 32'; Angeliño 73'; Cristante 88'	Report	Bianco (yellow card) 58'	Stadium: Stadio Olimpico; Attendance: 56,965; Referee: Fabio Maresca

2 March 2025 27	Roma	2–1	Como	Rome
18:00 CET (UTC+1)	Mancini (yellow card) 54'; Saelemaekers 61'; Cristante (yellow card) 69'; Dovbyk 76'	Report	Smolčić (yellow card) 12'; Kempf (yellow card) 27' (yellow-red card) 63'; Da Cunha 44', (yellow card) 86'; Caqueret (yellow card) 51'; Fadera (yellow card) 80'; Vojvoda (yellow card) 88'	Stadium: Stadio Olimpico; Attendance: 62,125; Referee: Luca Pairetto

9 March 2025 28	Empoli	0–1	Roma	Empoli
18:00 CET (UTC+1)		Report	Soulé 1'	Stadium: Stadio Carlo Castellani; Attendance: 12,393; Referee: Marco Di Bello

16 March 2025 29	Roma	1–0	Cagliari	Rome
15:00 CET (UTC+1)	Dovbyk 62'	Report	Viola (yellow card) 26'; Obert (yellow card) 40'	Stadium: Stadio Olimpico; Attendance: 62,911; Referee: Marco Piccinini

29 March 2025 30	Lecce	0–1	Roma	Lecce
20:45 CET (UTC+1)	Karlsson (yellow card) 54'	Report	Baldanzi (yellow card) 75'; Saelemaekers (yellow card) 78'; Dovbyk 80'	Stadium: Stadio Via del mare Attendance: 27,207; Referee: Gianluca Manganiello

6 April 2025 31	Roma	1–1	Juventus	Rome
20:45 CEST (UTC+2)	Cristante (yellow card) 26'; Shomurodov 49'	Report	Locatelli 40'; Veiga (yellow card) 65'	Stadium: Stadio Olimpico; Attendance: 65,778; Referee: Andrea Colombo

13 April 2025 32	Lazio	1–1	Roma	Rome
20:45 CEST (UTC+2)	Zaccagni (yellow card) 30'; Isaksen (yellow card) 45+1'; Romagnoli 47'; Pellegrini (yellow card) 63'; Rovella (yellow card) 88'	Report	Paredes (yellow card) 5'; Mancini (yellow card) 55'; Soulé 69'	Stadium: Stadio Olimpico; Attendance: 63,000; Referee: Simone Sozza

19 April 2025 33	Roma	1–0	Hellas Verona	Rome
20:45 CEST (UTC+2)	Shomurodov 4'	Report	Bernede (yellow card) 12'; Valentini (yellow card) 57'	Stadium: Stadio Olimpico; Attendance: 62,714; Referee: Luca Pairetto

27 April 2025 34	Internazionale	0–1	Roma	Milan
15:00 CEST (UTC+2)	L. Martínez (yellow card) 45'	Report	Mancini (yellow card) 3'; Soulé 22'; Koné (yellow card) 63'	Stadium: San Siro; Attendance: 70,240; Referee: Michael Fabbri
Note: The match was initially scheduled for 26 April 2025 at 18:00, but was postponed to the following day due to the funeral of Pope Francis.

4 May 2025 35	Roma	1–0	Fiorentina	Rome
18:00 CEST (UTC+2)	Dovbyk 45+5'; Soulé (yellow card) 89'; Pisilli (yellow card) 90+4'	Report	Ndour (yellow card) 64'; Kean (yellow card) 85'; Zaniolo (red card) 90+6'	Stadium: Stadio Olimpico; Attendance: 63,640; Referee: Daniele Chiffi
Note: Zaniolo received a red card after being substituted from the match.

12 May 2025 36	Atalanta	2–1	Roma	Bergamo
20:45 CEST (UTC+2)	Lookman 9'; Sulemana 76'; Djimsiti (yellow card) 90'	Report	Cristante 32'	Stadium: Gewiss Stadium; Attendance: 23,249; Referee: Simone Sozza

18 May 2025 37	Roma	3–1	Milan	Rome
20:45 CEST (UTC+2)	Mancini 3', (yellow card) 25'; Cristante (yellow card) 45', (goal) 87'; Paredes 58'; Çelik (yellow card) 61'	Report	Giménez (red card) 21'; Félix 39'; Jiménez (yellow card) 62'; Tomori (yellow card) 90'	Stadium: Stadio Olimpico; Attendance: 74,283; Referee: Marco Piccinini

25 May 2025 38	Torino	0–2	Roma	Turin
20:45 CEST (UTC+2)	Maripán (yellow card) 63'	Report	Paredes 18' (pen.); Saelemaekers 53'; Çelik (yellow card) 75'	Stadium: Stadio Olimpico Grande Torino; Attendance: 24,252; Referee: Marco Di Bello

=== Coppa Italia ===
18 December 2024 Round of 16	Roma	4–1	Sampdoria	Rome
21:00 CET (UTC+1)	Dovbyk 9', 19'; Pisilli (yellow card) 23'; Baldanzi 24'; Shomurodov 79'	Report	Vulikić (yellow card) 51'; Yepes 61'; Borini (yellow card) 67'	Stadium: Stadio Olimpico; Attendance: 56,858; Referee: Federico Dionisi

5 February 2025 Quarter-finals	Milan	3–1	Roma	Milan
21:00 CET (UTC+1)	Abraham 16', 42'; Félix 71'	Report	Dovbyk 54'; Koné (yellow card) 70'	Stadium: San Siro; Attendance: 57,878; Referee: Marco Piccinini

=== UEFA Europa League ===
==== League phase ====
The draw for the league phase was held on 30 August 2024.

Pos	Team	Pld	W	D	L	GF	GA	GD	Pts	Qualification
13	(Royal Spanish Football Federation) Real Sociedad	8	4	1	3	13	9	+4	13	Advance to knockout phase play-offs (seeded)
14	(Turkish Football Federation) Galatasaray	8	3	4	1	19	16	+3	13	Advance to knockout phase play-offs (seeded)
15	(Italian Football Federation) Roma	8	3	3	2	10	6	+4	12	Advance to knockout phase play-offs (seeded)
16	(Football Association of the Czech Republic) Viktoria Plzeň	8	3	3	2	13	12	+1	12	Advance to knockout phase play-offs (seeded)
17	(Hungarian Football Federation) Ferencváros	8	4	0	4	15	15	0	12	Advance to knockout phase play-offs (unseeded)

Source: UEFA
Rules for classification: League phase tiebreakers

Round	1	2	3	4	5	6	7	8
Ground	H	A	H	A	A	H	A	H
Result	D	L	W	D	D	W	L	W
Position	20	27	19	20	21	14	21	15

Source: UEFA
A = Away; H = Home; W = Win; D = Draw; L = Loss

26 September 2024 1	Roma (Italy)	1–1	(Spain) Athletic Bilbao	Rome, Italy
21:00 CEST (UTC+2)	Dovbyk 32'; Koné (yellow card) 44'; Baldanzi (yellow card) 63'	Report	Gorosabel (yellow card) 44'; Berchiche (yellow card) 56'; De Marcos (yellow card) 83'; Paredes 85'; N. Williams (yellow card) 90+5'	Stadium: Stadio Olimpico; Attendance: 63,072; Referee: Georgi Kabakov (Bulgaria)

3 October 2024 2	IF Elfsborg (Sweden)	1–0	(Italy) Roma	Borås, Sweden
21:00 CEST (UTC+2)	Qasem (yellow card) 36'; Baidoo 44' (pen.); Hult (yellow card) 52'; Zeneli (yellow card) 60'	Report	Dybala (yellow card) 90+5'	Stadium: Borås Arena; Attendance: 11,978; Referee: Kristo Tohver (Estonia)

24 October 2024 3	Roma (Italy)	1–0	(Ukraine) Dynamo Kyiv	Rome, Italy
18:45 CEST (UTC+2)	Dovbyk 23' (pen.); Angeliño (yellow card) 44'	Report	Mykhavko (yellow card) 22'; Rubchynskyi (yellow card) 36'; Kabayev (yellow card) 84'; Shaparenko (yellow card) 90+4'	Stadium: Stadio Olimpico; Attendance: 61,624; Referee: Serdar Gözübüyük (Netherlands)

7 November 2024 4	Union Saint-Gilloise (Belgium)	1–1	(Italy) Roma	Brussels, Belgium
18:45 CET (UTC+1)	Mac Allister 77'; Vanhoutte (yellow card) 89'; Sykes (yellow card) 90+2'	Report	Shomurodov (yellow card) 4'; Çelik (yellow card) 27'; Mancini 62'	Stadium: King Baudouin Stadium; Attendance: 13,875; Referee: Jérôme Brisard (France)
Note: The match was played at the King Baudouin Stadium in Brussels, instead of Union Saint-Gilloise's regular stadium, the Joseph Marien Stadium, which did not meet UEFA requirements.

28 November 2024 5	Tottenham Hotspur (England)	2–2	(Italy) Roma	London, England
20:00 GMT (UTC+0)	Son Heung-min 5' (pen.); Kulusevski (yellow card) 28'; Johnson 33'; Bentancur (yellow card) 72'	Report	Ndicka 20'; Paredes (yellow card) 28'; Hummels 90+1'	Stadium: Tottenham Hotspur Stadium; Attendance: 55,378; Referee: Glenn Nyberg (Sweden)

12 December 2024 6	Roma (Italy)	3–0	(Portugal) Braga	Rome, Italy
18:45 CET (UTC+1)	Pellegrini 10'; Abdulhamid 47'; Hummels (yellow card) 73'; Hermoso 90+1'	Report	Fernandes (yellow card) 32'; R. Horta (yellow card) 50'; Matheus (red card) 68'	Stadium: Stadio Olimpico; Attendance: 59,085; Referee: Daniel Siebert (Germany)

23 January 2025 7	AZ (Netherlands)	1–0	(Italy) Roma	Alkmaar, Netherlands
18:45 CET (UTC+1)	Meerdink (yellow card) 53'; Goes (yellow card) 63'; Parrott 80'; Belić (yellow card) 90+2'	Report	Dovbyk (yellow card) 19'; Hummels (yellow card) 35'; Saelemaekers (yellow card) 71'	Stadium: AFAS Stadion; Attendance: 18,635; Referee: Irfan Peljto (Bosnia and Herzegovina)

30 January 2025 8	Roma (Italy)	2–0	(Germany) Eintracht Frankfurt	Rome, Italy
21:00 CET (UTC+1)	Saelemaekers (yellow card) 6'; Angeliño 44'; Shomurodov 69'	Report		Stadium: Stadio Olimpico; Attendance: 64,458; Referee: Rade Obrenović (Slovenia)

==== Knockout phase ====
===== Knockout phase play-offs =====
The draw for the knockout phase play-offs was held on 31 January 2025.

13 February 2025 First leg	Porto (Portugal)	1–1	(Italy) Roma	Porto, Portugal
20:00 WET (UTC+0)	Varela (yellow card) 20'; Moura (yellow card) 45+2', (goal) 67'; Otávio (yellow card) 71'	Report	Pellegrini (yellow card) 18'; Çelik (yellow card) 28', (goal) 45+5'; Koné (yellow card) 34'; Saelemaekers (yellow card) 45+2'; Cristante (yellow card) 64' (yellow-red card) 72'; Paredes (yellow card) 90+4'; Baldanzi (yellow card) 90+4'	Stadium: Estádio do Dragão; Attendance: 37,129; Referee: Tobias Stieler (Germany)

20 February 2025 Second leg	Roma (Italy)	3–2 (4–3 agg.)	(Portugal) Porto	Rome, Italy
18:45 CET (UTC+1)	Dybala (yellow card) 29', (goal) 35', 39'; Paredes (yellow card) 51'; Pisilli 83'	Report	Otávio (yellow card) 26'; Aghehowa 27'; N. Pérez (yellow card) 34'; Eustáquio (red card) 51'; T. Pérez (yellow card) 85'; William Gomes (yellow card) 90+3'; Rensch 90+6' (o.g.)	Stadium: Stadio Olimpico; Attendance: 55,286; Referee: François Letexier (France)

===== Round of 16 =====
The draw for the round of 16 was held on 21 February 2025.

6 March 2025 First leg	Roma (Italy)	2–1	(Spain) Athletic Bilbao	Rome, Italy
21:00 CET (UTC+1)	Angeliño 56'; Shomurodov (yellow card) 72', (goal) 90+3'	Report	Yeray (yellow card) 19' (yellow-red card) 85'; Jauregizar (yellow card) 34'; Sannadi (yellow card) 39'; I. Williams 50'	Stadium: Stadio Olimpico; Attendance: 62,540; Referee: Sandro Schärer (Switzerland)

13 March 2025 Second leg	Athletic Bilbao (Spain)	3–1 (4–3 agg.)	(Italy) Roma	Bilbao, Spain
18:45 CET (UTC+1)	N. Williams 45+3', 82'; Berchiche 68'; I. Williams (yellow card) 71'; Gorosabel (yellow card) 90+1'	Report	Hummels (red card) 11'; Svilar (yellow card) 12'; Rensch (yellow card) 60'; Paredes (yellow card) 71', (goal) 90+3' (pen.); Soulé (yellow card) 90+3'	Stadium: San Mamés; Attendance: 50,666; Referee: Clément Turpin (France)

== Statistics ==
=== Appearances and goals ===
No.	Pos	Nat	Player	Total		Serie A		Coppa Italia		Europa League	
No.	Pos	Nat	Player	Apps	Goals	Apps	Goals	Apps	Goals	Apps	Goals
Goalkeepers
89	GK	(Italy) ITA	Renato Marin	0	0	0	0	0	0	0	0
95	GK	(Italy) ITA	Pierluigi Gollini	0	0	0	0	0	0	0	0
99	GK	(Serbia) SRB	Mile Svilar	51	0	38	0	1	0	12	0
Defenders
2	DF	(Netherlands) NED	Devyne Rensch	17	0	5+8	0	0+1	0	2+1	0
3	DF	(Spain) ESP	Angeliño	51	4	36+2	2	2	0	11	2
5	DF	(Ivory Coast) CIV	Evan Ndicka	51	1	38	0	2	0	11	1
15	DF	(Germany) GER	Mats Hummels	39	1	20+6	0	0	0	13	1
12	DF	(Saudi Arabia) KSA	Saud Abdulhamid	8	1	2+2	0	0	0	2+2	1
19	DF	(Turkey) TUR	Zeki Çelik	43	1	27+4	0	2	0	9+1	1
23	DF	(Italy) ITA	Gianluca Mancini	46	3	36+1	2	0	0	9	1
25	DF	(Denmark) DEN	Victor Nelsson	5	0	1+3	0	0+1	0	0	0
34	DF	(Netherlands) NED	Anass Salah-Eddine	3	0	2+1	0	0	0	0	0
Midfielders
4	MF	(Italy) ITA	Bryan Cristante	38	4	23+7	4	0	0	5+3	0
7	MF	(Italy) ITA	Lorenzo Pellegrini	34	3	20+5	2	0+2	0	5+2	1
16	MF	(Argentina) ARG	Leandro Paredes	32	4	15+7	3	2	0	6+2	1
17	MF	(France) FRA	Manu Koné	45	2	31+3	2	1	0	9+1	0
27	MF	(France) FRA	Lucas Gourna-Douath	6	0	2+4	0	0	0	0	0
35	MF	(Italy) ITA	Tommaso Baldanzi	41	2	5+26	1	1	1	6+3	0
61	MF	(Italy) ITA	Niccolò Pisilli	41	3	11+17	2	2	0	5+6	1
Forwards
11	FW	(Ukraine) UKR	Artem Dovbyk	45	17	27+5	12	1+1	3	8+3	2
14	FW	(Uzbekistan) UZB	Eldor Shomurodov	37	7	11+16	4	1+1	1	3+5	2
18	FW	(Argentina) ARG	Matías Soulé	39	5	22+5	5	0+1	0	2+9	0
21	FW	(Argentina) ARG	Paulo Dybala	36	8	16+8	6	1	0	9+2	2
56	FW	(Belgium) BEL	Alexis Saelemaekers	33	7	17+7	7	2	0	3+4	0
92	FW	(Italy) ITA	Stephan El Shaarawy	41	3	12+19	3	0+1	0	3+6	0
Players transferred/loaned out during the season
9	FW	(England) ENG	Tammy Abraham	1	0	0+1	0	0	0	0	0
22	DF	(Spain) ESP	Mario Hermoso	13	1	2+6	0	1	0	3+1	1
26	DF	(Sweden) SWE	Samuel Dahl	3	0	0+2	0	0+1	0	0	0
28	MF	(France) FRA	Enzo Le Fée	10	0	4+2	0	0+1	0	2+1	0
59	MF	(Poland) POL	Nicola Zalewski	17	0	4+8	0	1	0	2+2	0
98	GK	(Australia) AUS	Mathew Ryan	1	0	0	0	1	0	0	0

Source: Competitions
