= Niccolò Pisilli =

Italian footballer (born 2004)

Personal information
- Date of birth: 23 September 2004 (age 22)
- Place of birth: Rome, Italy
- Height: 1.81 m (5 ft 11 in)
- Position: Midfielder

Team information
- Current team: Roma
- Number: 61

Youth career
- 2011–2012: ASD Helios
- 2012–2024: Roma

Senior career*
| Years | Team | Apps | (Gls) |
| 2023– | Roma | 66 | (7) |

International career^{‡}
| 2021 | Italy U18 | 5 | (0) |
| 2022–2023 | Italy U19 | 10 | (3) |
| 2023–2024 | Italy U20 | 8 | (0) |
| 2024– | Italy U21 | 21 | (5) |
| 2024– | Italy | 5 | (0) |
Medal record
Men's football
Representing Italy
FIFA U-20 World Cup
| Runner-up | 2023 Argentina |
UEFA European Under-19 Championship
| Winner | 2023 Malta |
- * Club domestic league appearances and goals as of 23:46, 21 November 2026 (UTC) ‡ National team caps and goals as of 15 November 2026

Niccolò Pisilli (born 23 September 2004) is an Italian professional footballer who plays as a midfielder for Serie A club Roma and the Italy national team.

== Club career ==
Pisilli began playing football with a local club Helios, before moving to Roma at the age of eight and working his way up their youth categories. In November 2022, he signed a professional contract with the club until 2026.

Having originally been assigned to their under-19 team, Pisilli made his professional debut for Roma on 6 May 2023, as a late substitute in a 2–0 Serie A home loss against Inter Milan. In April of the same year, he was part of Roma's under-19 squad that won the Coppa Italia Primavera.

On 14 December 2023, Pisilli made his debut in a European competition, coming on as a substitute for Andrea Belotti in the 72nd minute of a UEFA Europa League group stage match against Sheriff Tiraspol; he went on to score his first professional goal in the injury time of the same game, helping Roma gain a 3–0 victory.

On 23 February 2025, Pisilli extended his contract with Roma until June 2029.

== International career ==
Pisilli is a youth international for Italy. In May 2023, he was included by head coach Carmine Nunziata in the Italian squad that took part in the FIFA U-20 World Cup in Argentina, where the Azzurrini finished runners-up after losing to Uruguay in the final match.

The same year in June, Pisilli was included in the Italian squad for the UEFA European Under-19 Championship in Malta, where the Azzurrini eventually won their second continental title. On 10 October 2024, Pisilli debuted for the Italian senior squad in a 2–2 draw against Belgium.

== Style of play ==
Pisilli is a versatile midfielder who contributes both offensively and defensively. He has been a regular presence in Roma's youth teams and is recognized for his ability to withstand physical challenges on the pitch. Known for his tactical awareness, Pisilli is adept at breaking down plays, with quick decision-making that aids in interceptions and recoveries.

== Career statistics ==
=== Club ===
As of match played 21 November 2026

Appearances and goals by club, season and competition
| Club | Season | League | | | Coppa Italia | | Europe | | Total | |
| Club | Season | Division | Apps | Goals | Apps | Goals | Apps | Goals | Apps | Goals |
|---|---|---|---|---|---|---|---|---|---|---|
| Roma | 2022–23 | Serie A | 1 | 0 | 0 | 0 | 0 | 0 | 1 | 0 |
| Roma | 2023–24 | Serie A | 1 | 0 | 0 | 0 | 1 (Note: Appearance(s) in UEFA Europa League) | 1 | 2 | 1 |
| Roma | 2024–25 | Serie A | 28 | 2 | 2 | 0 | 11 | 1 | 41 | 3 |
| Roma | 2025–26 | Serie A | 25 | 2 | 1 | 0 | 8 | 2 | 34 | 4 |
| Roma | 2026–27 | Serie A | 11 | 3 | 0 | 0 | 4 (Note: Appearances in UEFA Champions League) | 1 | 15 | 4 |
| Career total | | | 66 | 7 | 3 | 0 | 24 | 5 | 93 | 12 |

=== International ===
As of match played 15 November 2026

Appearances and goals by national team and year
| National team | Year | Apps | Goals |
|---|---|---|---|
| Italy | 2024 | 1 | 0 |
| Italy | 2025 | 0 | 0 |
| Italy | 2026 | 4 | 0 |
| Total | | 5 | 0 |

== Honours ==
Italy U20

- FIFA U-20 World Cup runner-up: 2023

Italy U19

- UEFA European Under-19 Championship: 2023

Individual

- Serie A Rising Star of the Month: May 2026
