= Giorgio De Marzi =

American soccer player (born 2007)

Personal information
- Date of birth: April 18, 2007 (age 19)
- Place of birth: Lancaster, California, United States
- Height: 6 ft 2 in (1.88 m)
- Position: Goalkeeper

Team information
- Current team: Roma
- Number: 70

Youth career
- 2021–2026: Roma

Senior career*
Years	Team	Apps	(Gls)
2025–	Roma	0	(0)

International career^{‡}
2026–	United States U19	1	(0)
- * Club domestic league appearances and goals as of January 23, 2025 ‡ National team caps and goals as of March 28, 2026

Giorgio De Marzi (born April 18, 2007) is an American soccer player who plays as a goalkeeper for Serie A club Roma.

== Early life ==
He was born on April 18, 2007, in Lancaster, California, United States, to Italian parents. He grew up in San Cesareo, Italy.

== Club career ==
De Marzi joined the youth academy of Serie A side Roma at the age of fourteen and helped the under-17 team win the league title. In 2024, he was promoted to the club's under-19 team and started training with the first team. On December 29, 2024, he was first named on a matchday squad for the first team during a 1–1 away draw with AC Milan in the league.

== International career ==
De Marzi was one of the 16 players who were called up for the March 2026 friendlies by USA U19 head coach Gonzalo Segares. He made his debut with the USA U19, featuring full-time in a 4–0 win match against Wales U19, on 28 March 2026.
