= Juan Córdoba =

Colombian footballer (born 2003)

Personal information
- Full name: Juan José Córdoba Zapata
- Date of birth: 11 July 2003 (age 23)
- Place of birth: Medellín, Colombia
- Height: 1.71 m (5 ft 7 in)
- Position: Forward

Team information
- Current team: Independiente Medellín (on loan from Dinamo Zagreb)
- Number: 70

Youth career
- Deportivo Cali

Senior career*
Years	Team	Apps	(Gls)
2022–2024	Deportivo Cali	40	(7)
2022	→ Fortaleza (loan)	14	(0)
2024–	Dinamo Zagreb	13	(2)
2026–	→ Independiente Medellín (loan)	0	(0)

International career^{‡}
2022	Colombia U20	7	(1)
- * Club domestic league appearances and goals as of 19:13, 17 May 2026 (UTC) ‡ National team caps and goals as of 18 February 2025

Juan José Córdoba Zapata (born 11 July 2003) is a Colombian professional footballer who plays as a forward for Independiente Medellín on loan from Dinamo Zagreb.

== Club career ==
Córdoba joined Dinamo Zagreb in the summer of 2024 from Deportivo Cali.

== Career statistics ==
As of match played 17 May 2026

Appearances and goals by club, season and competition
Club	Season	League			Cup		Continental		Other		Total	
Club	Season	Division	Apps	Goals	Apps	Goals	Apps	Goals	Apps	Goals	Apps	Goals
Deportivo Cali	2021	Liga DIMAYOR	1	0	0	0	—		—		1	0
Deportivo Cali	2023	Liga DIMAYOR	20	1	4	0	—		—		24	1
Deportivo Cali	2024	Liga DIMAYOR	22	6	0	0	—		—		22	6
Deportivo Cali	Total		43	7	4	0	0	0	—		47	7
Fortaleza (loan)	2022	Categoría Primera B	13	0	1	0	—		—		14	0
Dinamo Zagreb	2024–25	Croatian Football League	11	1	3	1	3 (Note: Appearances in UEFA Champions League)	0	—		17	2
Dinamo Zagreb	2025–26	Croatian Football League	2	1	0	0	0	0	—		1	1
Dinamo Zagreb	Total		12	2	3	1	3	0	—		18	3
Career total			68	9	8	1	3	0	0	0	79	10
