= Davide Mastrantonio =

Italian footballer (born 2004)

Personal information
- Date of birth: 16 January 2004 (age 22)
- Place of birth: Rome, Italy
- Height: 1.87 m (6 ft 2 in)
- Position: Goalkeeper

Team information
- Current team: Latina
- Number: 67

Youth career
- –2017: Urbetevere
- 2017–2022: Roma
- 2024–2025: → AC Milan (loan)

Senior career*
Years	Team	Apps	(Gls)
2022–2025	Roma	0	(0)
2022–2023	→ Triestina (loan)	10	(0)
2023–2024	→ Monterosi (loan)	16	(0)
2024	→ Pro Vercelli (loan)	5	(0)
2024–2025	→ Milan Futuro (res.) (loan)	0	(0)
2025	→ Triestina (loan)	0	(0)
2025–	Latina	35	(0)

International career^{‡}
2021–2022	Italy U18	10	(0)
2022–2023	Italy U19	13	(0)
2023	Italy U20	1	(0)
Medal record
Men's football
Representing Italy
UEFA European Under-19 Championship
Winner	2023 Malta
Mediterranean Games
Runner-up	Oran 2022	U-18 Team
- * Club domestic league appearances and goals as of 1 May 2026 ‡ National team caps and goals as of 16 November 2023

Davide Mastrantonio (born 16 January 2004) is an Italian professional footballer who plays as a goalkeeper for Serie C Group B club Latina.

== Club career ==
Born in Rome, Mastrantonio started playing football at Urbetevere, before joining Roma's youth sector in 2017, aged 13. He subsequently came through the club's youth ranks, winning national titles at under-15 (in 2019) and under-17 levels (in 2020), before reaching the final of the under-19 championship in 2022. After signing his first professional contract with Roma in July 2021, the following year Mastrantonio renewed his deal with the club until 2026.

On 13 July 2022, the goalkeeper was sent on a season-long loan to Serie C club Triestina. He then made his professional debut on 3 September, aged 18, as he started the league match against Pordenone, which ended in a 2–0 loss for his side.

On 26 July 2023, Mastrantonio joined Serie C club Monterosi on a season-long loan. After six months his loan was cut short and on 26 January 2024, he moved on a six-month loan to Pro Vercelli.

On 1 August 2024, Mastrantonio joined Milan Futuro, the newly created reserve team of AC Milan, on a season-long loan. Some days later on 17 August, he started with the under-19 squad on the first match of the season, making some impressive saves at the 4–0 win against the newly Campionato Primavera 1 promoted Udinese under-19 squad. He continued to play for the under-19 squad during his Milan spell, remaining on the bench in Serie C games. On 30 January 2025, Mastrantonio returned to Triestina on a new loan.

On 18 July 2025, Mastrantonio moved to Serie C club Latina on a permanent basis and signed a two-season contract.

== International career ==
Mastrantonio has represented Italy at youth international level, having played for the under-18 and under-19 national teams.

He was included in the under-18 squad that took part in the 2022 Mediterranean Games in Oran, Algeria, with the Azzurrini eventually winning the silver medal after losing 1–0 against France in the final match.

In June 2023, he was included in the Italian squad for the UEFA European Under-19 Championship in Malta, where the Azzurrini eventually won their second continental title.

== Style of play ==
Mastrantonio is a goalkeeper known for his reflexes, agility, handling, and distribution. He has also been noted for his leadership in defense and his ability as a shot-stopper, including saving penalties.

Due to his characteristics, he has been compared to Wojciech Szczęsny and Manuel Neuer.

== Career statistics ==
=== Club ===
As of match played 9 March 2024

Appearances and goals by club, season and competition
Club	Season	League			Cup		Other		Total	
Club	Season	Division	Apps	Goals	Apps	Goals	Apps	Goals	Apps	Goals
Roma	2021–22	Serie A	0	0	0	0	0	0	0	0
Triestina (loan)	2022–23	Serie C	10	0	—		0	0	10	0
Monterosi (loan)	2023–24	Serie C	16	0	—		0	0	16	0
Pro Vercelli (loan)	2023–24	Serie C	5	0	—		0	0	5	0
Milan Futuro (loan)	2024–25	Serie C	0	0	0	0	0	0	0	0
Career total			31	0	0	0	0	0	31	0

== Honours ==
Italy U19

- UEFA European Under-19 Championship: 2023
