= 2024–25 GNK Dinamo Zagreb season =

GNK Dinamo Zagreb
2024–25 season
- Chairman: Velimir Zajec
- Manager: Sergej Jakirović (until 19 September); Sandro Perković (caretaker) (20 September – 25 September); Nenad Bjelica (26 September – 29 December); Fabio Cannavaro (29 December – 9 April); Sandro Perković (caretaker) (from 10 April)
- Stadium: Stadion Maksimir
- HNL: 2nd
- Croatian Cup: Quarter-finals
- UEFA Champions League: League phase
- Top goalscorer: League: Sandro Kulenović (15); All: Sandro Kulenović (22)
- Highest home attendance: 23,756
- Lowest home attendance: 0
Home colours	Away colours	Third colours

The 2024–25 season was GNK Dinamo Zagreb's 114th season in existence and 33rd consecutive in the Croatian Football League. They also competed in the Croatian Cup and the UEFA Champions League.

== Players ==
=== First-team squad ===
As of 23 February 2025

Note: Flags indicate national team as defined under FIFA eligibility rules; some limited exceptions apply. Players may hold more than one non-FIFA nationality.

No.	Pos.	Nation	Player
1	GK	CRO	Danijel Zagorac
2	DF	IRN	Sadegh Moharrami
4	DF	ESP	Raúl Torrente
5	MF	MKD	Arijan Ademi (captain)
7	MF	CRO	Luka Stojković
8	MF	CRO	Lukas Kačavenda
9	FW	CRO	Bruno Petković
10	MF	CRO	Martin Baturina
11	FW	ALB	Arbër Hoxha
12	DF	CRO	Petar Bočkaj
13	DF	MAR	Samy Mmaee
14	DF	ESP	Jan Oliveras (on loan from Roma)
15	DF	CRO	Niko Galešić
16	FW	CIV	Wilfried Kanga
17	FW	CRO	Sandro Kulenović
18	DF	FRA	Ronaël Pierre-Gabriel

No.	Pos.	Nation	Player
19	FW	COL	Juan Córdoba
20	FW	CRO	Marko Pjaca
21	FW	COD	Nathanaël Mbuku
22	DF	MKD	Stefan Ristovski
23	MF	CRO	Leon Belcar
25	MF	CRO	Petar Sučić
26	GK	CRO	Nikola Čavlina
27	MF	CRO	Josip Mišić
28	DF	FRA	Kévin Théophile-Catherine
30	MF	CRO	Marko Rog (on loan from Cagliari)
33	GK	CRO	Ivan Nevistić
35	DF	CRO	Noa Mikić
38	MF	CRO	Bartol Franjić
55	DF	CRO	Dino Perić
66	MF	CRO	Branko Pavić

As of 15 August 2024 after match against (Croatia) NK Osijek

Squad no.	Name	Nat.	Pos.	Date of birth	Signed from	Apps	Goals
Goalkeepers
1	Danijel Zagorac	(Croatia)	GK	7 February 1987 (aged 37)	(Croatia) Split	79	0
23	Ivan Filipović	(Croatia)	GK	13 November 1994 (aged 29)	(France) Paris	0	0
33	Ivan Nevistić	(Croatia)	GK	31 July 1998 (aged 26)	(Croatia) HNK Rijeka	38	0
Defenders
2	Sadegh Moharrami	(Iran)	RB	1 March 1996 (aged 28)	(Iran) Persepolis	134	1
3	Takuya Ogiwara	(Japan)	LB	23 November 1999 (aged 24)	(Japan) Urawa	12	0
4	Raúl Torrente	(Spain)	CB	1 January 2000 (aged 24)	(Spain) Granada	1	0
6	Maxime Bernauer	(France)	CB	1 July 1998 (aged 25)	(France) Paris	25	2
13	Samy Mmaee	(Morocco)	CB	8 September 1996 (aged 27)	(Hungary) Ferencváros	2	0
14	Jan Oliveras	(Spain)	LB	7 July 2004 (aged 19)	(Italy) Roma	3	0
18	Ronaël Pierre-Gabriel	(France)	RB	13 June 1998 (aged 25)	(France) Nantes	13	1
22	Stefan Ristovski	(North Macedonia)	RB	12 February 1992 (aged 32)	(Portugal) Sporting	148	6
28	Kévin Théophile-Catherine	(France)	CB	28 October 1989 (aged 34)	(France) Saint-Étienne	182	4
36	Noa Mikić	(Croatia)	RB	27 January 2007 (aged 17)	(Croatia) Youth Academy	0	0
39	Mauro Perković	(Croatia)	CB	22 March 2003 (aged 20)	(Croatia) Istra 1961	41	2
55	Dino Perić	(Croatia)	CB	12 July 1994 (aged 29)	(Croatia) Lokomotiva	182	15
Midfielders
5	Arijan Ademi	(North Macedonia)	CM	29 May 1991 (aged 33)	(China) Beijing Guoan	405	44
7	Luka Stojković	(Croatia)	AM	28 October 2003 (aged 20)	(Croatia) Lokomotiva	1	0
8	Lukas Kačavenda	(Croatia)	AM	2 March 2003 (aged 21)	(Croatia) Lokomotiva	2	0
10	Martin Baturina	(Croatia)	AM	16 February 2003 (aged 21)	(Croatia) Youth Academy	120	16
25	Petar Sučić	(Croatia)	CM	25 October 2003 (aged 20)	(Bosnia and Herzegovina) HŠK Zrinjski Mostar	45	2
27	Josip Mišić	(Croatia)	CM	28 June 1994 (aged 29)	(Portugal) Sporting	176	6
30	Marko Rog	(Croatia)	AM	19 July 1995 (aged 28)	(Italy) Cagliari	47	4
36	Luka Vrbančić	(Croatia)	CM	4 July 2005 (aged 19)	(Croatia) Youth Academy	6	3
66	Branko Pavić	(Croatia)	DM	7 November 2006 (aged 17)	(Croatia) Youth Academy	2	0
Forwards
9	Bruno Petković	(Croatia)	FW	16 September 1994 (aged 29)	(Italy) Bologna	253	81
11	Arbër Hoxha	(Albania)	LW	6 October 1998 (aged 25)	(Croatia) Slaven Belupo	23	4
17	Sandro Kulenović	(Croatia)	FW	4 December 1999 (aged 24)	(Poland) Legia Warsaw	55	12
19	Juan Córdoba	(Colombia)	RW	11 July 2003 (aged 21)	(Colombia) Deportivo Cali	0	0
20	Marko Pjaca	(Croatia)	LW	22 March 1999 (aged 25)	(Croatia) HNK Rijeka	94	28
77	Dario Špikić	(Croatia)	RW	22 March 1999 (aged 25)	(Croatia) HNK Gorica	124	16

== Transfers ==
=== In ===
No.	Pos	Player	Transferred from	Fee	Date	Source
	GK	(Croatia) Nikola Čavlina	(Croatia) Lokomotiva	€0.75 million	29 June 2024	
23	GK	(Croatia) Ivan Filipović	(France) Paris	Free	1 July 2024	
20	FW	(Croatia) Marko Pjaca	(Croatia) Rijeka	€1.5 million	3 July 2024	
4	DF	(Spain) Raúl Torrente	(Spain) Granada	Free	4 July 2024	
13	DF	(Morocco) Samy Mmaee	(Hungary) Ferencváros	Free	17 July 2024	
8	MF	(Croatia) Lukas Kačavenda	(Croatia) Lokomotiva	€0.75 million	1 August 2024	
19	FW	(Colombia) Juan Córdoba	(Colombia) Deportivo Cali	€2.1 million	9 August 2024	
14	DF	(Spain) Jan Oliveras	(Italy) Roma	Loan	14 August 2024	

== Competitions ==
=== Croatian Football League ===
==== League table ====
Pos	Team	Pld	W	D	L	GF	GA	GD	Pts	Qualification or relegation (Note: The 2024–25 Croatian Football Cup winners qualify for the Europa League first qualifying round (or the second-placed team if the Croatian Cup winners finish first). If the Croatian Cup winners finish in the top three, the second Conference League second qualifying round spot will be passed to the fourth-placed team.)
1	Rijeka (C)	36	18	11	7	49	21	+28	65 (Note: Head to head points (GD) = Rijeka 5 (+3), Dinamo Zagreb 5 (-3).)	Qualification to Champions League second qualifying round
2	Dinamo Zagreb	36	19	8	9	69	41	+28	65	Qualification to Europa League league phase
3	Hajduk Split	36	17	12	7	49	34	+15	63	Qualification to Conference League second qualifying round
4	Varaždin	36	11	16	9	28	24	+4	49	Qualification to Conference League second qualifying round
5	Slaven Belupo	36	13	9	14	42	45	−3	48	

Source: SuperSport HNL
Rules for classification: 1) Points; 2) Head-to-head points; 3) Head-to-head goal difference; 4) Head-to-head goals scored (at home if two teams tied); 5) Goal difference; 6) Goals scored; 7) Play-off
(Note: Criteria 2-4 and 7 is only used if deciding champion, teams to international competition or teams for relegation and in that case criteria 6 will not be used).
(C) Champions

==== Results summary ====
Overall								Home						Away					
Pld	W	D	L	GF	GA	GD	Pts	W	D	L	GF	GA	GD	W	D	L	GF	GA	GD
36	19	8	9	69	41	+28	65	13	3	2	44	14	+30	6	5	7	25	27	−2

Last updated: 26 May 2025.
Source: SuperSport HNL

==== Results by round ====
Round	1	2	3	4	5	6	7	8	9	10	11	12	13	14	15	16	17	18	19	20	21	22	23	24	25	26	27	28	29	30	31	32	33	34	35	36
Ground	H	A	H	H	A	H	A	H	A	A	H	A	A	H	A	H	A	H	H	A	H	H	A	H	A	H	A	A	H	A	A	H	A	H	A	H
Result	W	W	W	W	D	L	L	W	W	D	L	W	D	D	L	D	L	W	W	L	W	W	L	D	W	W	D	L	W	W	L	W	W	W	D	W
Position	1	1	1	1	1	3	3	3	3	3	3	3	3	3	3	3	3	3	3	3	3	3	3	3	3	3	3	3	3	3	3	3	2	2	2	2

Updated to match(es) played on 26 May 2025. Source: SuperSport HNL
A = Away; H = Home; W = Win; D = Draw; L = Loss

==== Matches ====
2 August 2024 1	Dinamo Zagreb	5–0	Istra 1961	Maksimir, Zagreb
21:00 CEST (UTC+02:00)	Hoxha 13'; Théophile-Catherine 19'; Kulenović 28', 49'; Pierre-Gabriel 79'	Report	Blagojević (yellow card) 28'; Kadušić (yellow card) 40'	Attendance: 6,057; Referee: Mario Zebec

11 August 2024 2	Osijek	1–2	Dinamo Zagreb	Opus Arena, Osijek
21:00 CEST (UTC+02:00)	Lima 10'; Omerović (yellow card) 50'; Bukvić (yellow card) 66'; Jugović (yellow card) 66'; Mkrtchyan (yellow card) 90+9'	Report	Hoxha 21'; Théophile-Catherine (yellow card) 83'; Ristovski 90+6' (yellow card) 90+6'	Attendance: 9,172; Referee: Duje Strukan

16 August 2024 3	Dinamo Zagreb	3–0	Šibenik	Maksimir, Zagreb
21:00 CEST (UTC+02:00)	Ristovski 6'; Kulenović 56'; Špikić 19'; Bernauer (yellow card) 34'; Mmaee (yellow card) 84'	Report	Bakić (yellow card) 38'; Punčec (yellow card) 41'; Perić 85'	Attendance: 11,924; Referee: Dario Bel

24 August 2024 4	Dinamo Zagreb	2–1	Gorica	Maksimir, Zagreb
20:30 CEST (UTC+02:00)	Kulenović 6', 57'; Mmaee (yellow card) 64'	Report	Leš (yellow card) 72'; Sagna (yellow card) 78'; Pršir 90+1'	Attendance: 9,644; Referee: Ante Terzić

1 September 2024 5	Rijeka	1–1	Dinamo Zagreb	Rujevica, Rijeka
20:45 CEST (UTC+02:00)	Majstorović (yellow card) 30'; Petrovič (yellow card) 45+1'; Hodža 50'; Andrić (yellow card) 68'; Radeljić (yellow card) 90+1'	Report	Petković 22'; Sučić (yellow card) 45+2'; Mišić (yellow card) 66'; Córdoba (yellow card) 90'	Attendance: 5,624; Referee: Duje Strukan (Split)

13 September 2024 6	Dinamo Zagreb	0–1	Hajduk Split	Maksimir, Zagreb
20:00 CEST (UTC+02:00)	Théophile-Catherine (yellow card) 55'; Ristovski (yellow card) 61'	Report	Livaja (yellow card) 38' (goal) 70'; Šarlija (yellow card) 38'; Diallo (yellow card) 53' (yellow-red card) 90+4'; Pukštas (yellow card) 63'; Biuk (yellow card) 90+13'	Attendance: 20,948; Referee: Igor Pajač (Sv. Ivan Zelina)

21 September 2024 7	Slaven Belupo	4–1	Dinamo Zagreb	Apaš, Koprivnica
17:30 CEST (UTC+02:00)	Agbekpornu (yellow card) 29'; Crepulja 45+1'; Liber 67'; Dolček 74'; Nestorovski 77'	Report	Petković (yellow card) 29' (goal) 32'	Attendance: 2,897; Referee: Patrik Kolarić

28 September 2024 8	Dinamo Zagreb	5–1	Lokomotiva	Maksimir, Zagreb
20:00 CEST (UTC+02:00)	Baturina 13'; Ademi (yellow card) 27' (goal) 51'; Petković 34'; Torrente 90+1', 90+5'	Report	Vrbančić 54'; Kolinger (yellow card) 69'; Fetai (yellow card) 73'	Attendance: 8,396; Referee: Toni Dadić

6 October 2024 9	Varaždin	0–1	Dinamo Zagreb	Stadion Varteks, Varaždin
16:00 CEST (UTC+02:00)		Report	Pierre-Gabriel (yellow card) 31'; Córdoba 35'; Zagorac (yellow card) 90+6'	Attendance: 7,314; Referee: Duje Strukan

19 October 2024 10	Istra 1961	2–2	Dinamo Zagreb	Aldo Drosina, Pula
18:30 CEST (UTC+02:00)	Blagojević (yellow card) 25'; Valinčić (yellow card) 25'; Keller (yellow card) 30' (yellow-red card) 60'; Lisica 43'; Heister (yellow card) 51'; Lekweiry 53'; Koski (yellow card) 79'	Report	Ademi 52'; Torrente (yellow card) 56'; Ristovski (yellow card) 63'; Mišić (yellow card) 70'; Kulenović 80' (pen.)	Attendance: 3,287; Referee: Dario Bel

27 October 2024 11	Dinamo Zagreb	2–4	Osijek	Maksimir, Zagreb
16:00 CET (UTC+01:00)	Pjaca 18', 51'; Mišić (yellow card) 21'; Bernauer (yellow card) 75'; Kulenović (yellow card) 76'	Report	Jakupović 22', 89' (pen.); Jurišić 40'; Fortes 53'; Omerović (yellow card) 73'	Attendance: 13,477; Referee: Patrik Kolarić

1 November 2024 12	Šibenik	0–4	Dinamo Zagreb	Šubićevac, Šibenik
18:00 CET (UTC+01:00)	Agyemang (yellow card) 44'; Božić (yellow card) 45+3'	Report	Sučić 11'; Kulenović 45+1' (pen.), 50'; Mbuku 86'	Attendance: 3,017; Referee: Zdenko Lovrić

9 November 2024 13	Gorica	2–2	Dinamo Zagreb	ŠRC Velika Gorica, Velika Gorica
15:00 CET (UTC+01:00)	Šlogar (yellow card) 2'; Kolar 14'; Krizmanić 62'; Ndockyt (yellow card) 69'; Štiglec (yellow card) 73'; Banić (yellow card) 75'; Steenvoorden (yellow card) 90+4'	Report	Špikić 45'; Mbuku 86'; Ristovski (yellow card) 90'	Attendance: 5,138; Referee: Dario Bel

23 November 2024 14	Dinamo Zagreb	0–0	Rijeka	Maksimir, Zagreb
17:45 CET (UTC+01:00)	Ogiwara (yellow card) 56'; Ristovski (yellow card) 75'; Torrente (yellow card) 82'	Report	Zlomislić (yellow card) 76'; Smolčić (yellow card) 83'; Galešić (yellow card) 83'	Attendance: 12,066; Referee: Duje Strukan (Split)

1 December 2024 15	Hajduk Split	1–0	Dinamo Zagreb	Poljud, Split
17:45 CET (UTC+01:00)	Sigur 55'; Kalik (yellow card) 68'; Diallo (yellow card) 90+2'; Uremović (yellow card) 90+5'; Kalinić (yellow card) 90+5'; Lučić (yellow card) 90+6'	Report	Ristovski (yellow card) 28'; Rog (red card) 88'; Pierre-Gabriel (yellow card) 90+5'	Attendance: 33,502; Referee: Patrik Kolarić (Čakovec)

6 December 2024 16	Dinamo Zagreb	1–1	Slaven Belupo	Maksimir, Zagreb
18:00 CET (UTC+01:00)	Kačavenda 23'	Report	Grgić 56'	Attendance: 7,510; Referee: Mateo Erceg

14 December 2024 17	Lokomotiva	3–1	Dinamo Zagreb	Kranjčevićeva, Zagreb
15:00 CET (UTC+01:00)	Mudražija 14', 45+1'; Pajač (yellow card) 33'; Karačić 36'; Fetai (yellow card) 77'	Report	Pjaca 27'; Kačavenda (yellow card) 45+1'; Moharrami (yellow card) 90+1'	Attendance: 2,765; Referee: Ante Čulina

22 December 2024 18	Dinamo Zagreb	3–2	Varaždin	Maksimir, Zagreb
13:00 CET (UTC+01:00)	Kačavenda 9'; Maglica 26' (o.g.); Moharrami (yellow card) 49'; Rog (yellow card) 60'; Pjaca 74'; Pierre-Gabriel (yellow card) 90+2'	Report	Tepšić (yellow card) 54'; Belcar (yellow card) 57'; Alić (yellow card) 70'; Pierre-Gabriel 72' (o.g.); Poldrugač (yellow card) 80'; Mamić 90+2'	Attendance: 0 Referee: Ante Terzić

25 January 2025 19	Dinamo Zagreb	3–1	Istra 1961	Maksimir, Zagreb
17:30	Kulenović 21'; Baturina 49'; Stojković 61'	Report	Rozić 26'	Attendance: 9,150; Referee: Patrik Kolarić

2 February 2025 20	Osijek	2–1	Dinamo Zagreb	Opus Arena, Osijek
15:00	Omerović 2'; Soldo 60'	Report	Stojković 57'	Attendance: 9,453; Referee: Igor Pajač

7 February 2025 21	Dinamo Zagreb	3–0	Šibenik	Maksimir, Zagreb
18:00	Mmaee 38'; Hoxha 74'; Baturina 78'	Report		Attendance: 8,191; Referee: Tihomir Pejin

15 February 2025 22	Dinamo Zagreb	3–1	Gorica	Maksimir, Zagreb
17:30	Kanga 33'; Pjaca 75'; Kulenović 90+6'	Report	Elezi 27'	Attendance: 8,368; Referee: Zdenko Lovrić

22 February 2025 23	Rijeka	4–0	Dinamo Zagreb	Rijeka
17:45	Djouahra 27'; Janković 39'; Petrovič 44'; Čop 52'	Report		Stadium: Rujevica; Attendance: 7,091; Referee: Dario Bel

2 March 2025 24	Dinamo Zagreb	2–2	Hajduk Split	Maksimir, Zagreb
15:00	Baturina 5'; Pierre-Gabriel 48'	Report	Franjić 31' (o.g.); Krovinović 90+1'	Attendance: 16,901; Referee: Mateo Erceg

9 March 2025 25	Slaven Belupo	0–1	Dinamo Zagreb	Koprivnica
17:30		Report	Stojković 18'	Stadium: Gradski stadion Attendance: 3,200; Referee: Patrik Kolarić

15 March 2025 26	Dinamo Zagreb	3–0	Lokomotiva	Maksimir, Zagreb
17:30	Théophile-Catherine 14'; Stojković 33'; Kanga 61'	Report		Attendance: 6,414; Referee: Ante Čulina

30 March 2025 27	Varaždin	1–1	Dinamo Zagreb	Stadion Varteks, Varaždin
18:45 CEST (UTC+02:00)	Petković 82' (pen.)	Report	Mitrovski 77'	Attendance: 7,812; Referee: Patrik Kolarić

5 April 2025 28	Istra 1961	3–0	Dinamo Zagreb	Aldo Drosina, Pula
18:45 CEST (UTC+02:00)	Lončar 22'; Torrente 53' (o.g.); Lawal 68'	Report		Attendance: 4,685; Referee: Mateo Erceg

12 April 2025 29	Dinamo Zagreb	2–0	Osijek	Maksimir, Zagreb
18:45 CEST (UTC+02:00)	Sučić 22'; Ademi 70'	Report		Attendance: 7,497; Referee: Patrik Kolarić

17 April 2025 30	Šibenik	0–4	Dinamo Zagreb	Šubićevac, Šibenik
18:00 CEST (UTC+02:00)		Report	Kulenović 14', 70'; Santini 48' (o.g.); Kanga 84'	Attendance: 1,991; Referee: Igor Pajač

23 April 2025 31	Gorica	1–0	Dinamo Zagreb	ŠRC Velika Gorica, Velika Gorica
15:00 CEST (UTC+02:00)	Pajaziti 68'	Report		Attendance: 4,993; Referee: Zdenko Lovrić

27 April 2025 32	Dinamo Zagreb	1–0	Rijeka	Maksimir, Zagreb
18:45 CEST (UTC+02:00)	Pjaca 13'	Report		Attendance: 15,711; Referee: Patrik Kolarić

3 May 2025 33	Hajduk Split	1–3	Dinamo Zagreb	Poljud, Split
16:00 CEST (UTC+02:00)	Livaja 55'	Report	Pierre-Gabriel 51'; Kulenović 64'; Sučić 90+12'	Attendance: 32,111; Referee: Mateo Erceg

10 May 2025 34	Dinamo Zagreb	5–0	Slaven Belupo	Maksimir, Zagreb
19:45 CEST (UTC+02:00)	Stojković 17', 44'; Kulenović 41'; Sučić 65'; Rog 73'	Report		Attendance: 11,750; Referee: Igor Pajač

17 May 2025 35	Lokomotiva	1–1	Dinamo Zagreb	Maksimir, Zagreb
19:15 CEST (UTC+02:00)	Goričan 73'	Report	Kulenović 39' (pen.)	Attendance: 8,981; Referee: Duje Strukan

25 May 2025 36	Dinamo Zagreb	1–0	Varaždin	Maksimir, Zagreb
17:00 CEST (UTC+02:00)	Sučić 39'	Report		Attendance: 23,756; Referee: Dario Bel

=== Croatian Cup ===
25 September 2024 R1	Banjole	1–3	Dinamo Zagreb	Stadion Prematinka
	Kamenicki 33'	Report	Špikić 16'; Kulenović 10'; Ademi 85'	Referee: Dario Kulušić

11 February 2025 R2	Bjelovar	2–3	Dinamo Zagreb	Gradski stadion
	Akanni 9'; Čikvar 56'	Report	Kulenović 6' (pen.); Córdoba 76'; Pierre-Gabriel 90'

26 February 2025 Quarter-final	Dinamo Zagreb	0–1	Osijek	Maksimir
			Babec 21'	Attendance: 4,276

=== UEFA Champions League ===
==== Play-off round ====
The draw for the play-off round was held on 5 August 2024.

20 August 2024 First leg	Dinamo Zagreb (Croatia)	3–0	(Azerbaijan) Qarabağ	Stadion Maksimir, Zagreb
21:00	Pjaca 29'; Kulenović 75', 80'	Report		Attendance: 14,073; Referee: Glenn Nyberg (Sweden)

28 August 2024 Second leg	Qarabağ (Azerbaijan)	0–2 (0–5 agg.)	(Croatia) Dinamo Zagreb	Tofiq Bahramov Republican Stadium, Baku
18:45		Report	Pjaca 32'; Silva 53' (o.g.)	Attendance: 29,800; Referee: Michael Oliver (England)

==== League phase ====
The draw for the league phase was held on 29 August 2024.

Pos	Team	Pld	W	D	L	GF	GA	GD	Pts	Qualification
23	(Portugal) Sporting CP	8	3	2	3	13	12	+1	11	Advance to knockout phase play-offs (unseeded)
24	(Belgium) Club Brugge	8	3	2	3	7	11	−4	11	Advance to knockout phase play-offs (unseeded)
25	(Croatia) Dinamo Zagreb	8	3	2	3	12	19	−7	11	
26	(Germany) VfB Stuttgart	8	3	1	4	13	17	−4	10	
27	(Ukraine) Shakhtar Donetsk	8	2	1	5	8	16	−8	7	

Source: UEFA
Rules for classification: League phase tiebreakers

17 September 2024 MD 1	Bayern Munich (Germany)	9–2	(Croatia) Dinamo Zagreb	Allianz Arena, Munich
21:00	Kane 19' (pen.), 57', 73' (pen.), 78' (pen.); Guerreiro 33'; Olise 38', 61'; Sané 85'; Goretzka 90+2'	Report	Petković 49'; Ogiwara 50'	Attendance: 75,000; Referee: Juan Martínez Munuera (Spain)

2 October 2024 MD 2	Dinamo Zagreb (Croatia)	2–2	(France) Monaco	Stadion Maksimir, Zagreb
21:00	Sučić 45+3'; Baturina 66'	Report	Salisu 74'; Zakaria 90' (pen.)	Attendance: 12,462; Referee: Harm Osmers (Germany)

23 October 2024 MD 3	Red Bull Salzburg (Austria)	0–2	(Croatia) Dinamo Zagreb	Red Bull Arena, Salzburg
21:00		Report	Kulenović 49'; Petković 84'	Attendance: 24,018; Referee: Danny Makkelie (Netherlands)

5 November 2024 MD 4	Slovan Bratislava (Slovakia)	1–4	(Croatia) Dinamo Zagreb	Tehelné pole, Bratislava
18:45	Strelec 5'	Report	Špikić 10'; Sučić 30'; Kulenović 54', 72'	Attendance: 22,132; Referee: Anthony Taylor (England)

27 November 2024 MD 5	Dinamo Zagreb (Croatia)	0–3	(Germany) Borussia Dortmund	Stadion Maksimir, Zagreb
21:00		Report	Gittens 41'; Bensebaini 56'; Guirassy 90'	Attendance: 20,019; Referee: Clément Turpin (France)

10 December 2024 MD 6	Dinamo Zagreb (Croatia)	0–0	(Scotland) Celtic	Zagreb, Croatia
18:45 CET		Report		Stadium: Stadion Maksimir; Referee: Felix Zwayer (Germany)

22 January 2025 MD 7	Arsenal (England)	3–0	(Croatia) Dinamo Zagreb	London, England
20:00 GMT	Rice 2'; Havertz 66'; Ødegaard 90+1'	Report		Stadium: Emirates Stadium; Attendance: 60,000; Referee: Daniel Siebert (Germany)

29 January 2025 MD 8	Dinamo Zagreb (Croatia)	2–1	(Italy) Milan	Stadion Maksimir, Zagreb
20:00 GMT	Baturina 19'; Pjaca 60'	Report	Pulisic 53'	Attendance: 18,856; Referee: François Letexier (France)
