= Muhammed Bah =

Gambian footballer (born 2007)

Personal information
- Date of birth: 24 February 2007 (age 19)
- Place of birth: Banjul, The Gambia
- Position: Midfielder

Team information
- Current team: Roma
- Number: 69

Youth career
- Roma

Senior career*
Years	Team	Apps	(Gls)
2026–	Roma	0	(0)
- * Club domestic league appearances and goals as of 1 August 2026

Muhammed Bah (born 24 February 2007) is a Gambian footballer who plays as a midfielder for Serie A club Roma.

== Club career ==
Born in Banjul, The Gambia capital, Bah joined the AS Roma Academy in 2022.

With the club from the Italian capital, Bah soon became a standout with the youth teams: during his first season he became a leader of the under-18, while guiding the under-17 to the national title. During the following season, while still only 16 he started playing with the Primavera team that had just won the Coppa and Supercoppa.

But has he had been called to Daniele De Rossi's first team in February 2024, he suffered a Cruciate ligament injury on his left knee that ended his season.

After coming back from the injury in December 2024, Bah went on to become a major standout of the Primavera team during the 2024–25 and 2025–26 season.

On the 15 December 2025 he first featured on the team sheet with the first team during a Serie A game against Como, as he started regularly training with Gian Piero Gasperini's squad.

In April 2026, he signed his first professional contract with Roma, tying him to the club until 2028.

During summer 2026, he became a first team player with Gasperini: he was a starter against Trastevere and Cannes in the pre-season friendlies.

But in the third friendly against Cardiff City, as Bah was still starting in the midfield, he suffered a right knee injury, once more halting his first team progress.

== Style of play ==
A right-footed central midfielder, Muhammed Bah mainly played as a box-to-box midfielder during his youth years in Rome, recovering and quickly projecting himself in the attack, able bot to finish the action in front of the goal or to retain possession through his good ball protection.

== Personal life ==
Muhammed Bah is the cousin of Gambian international Ebrima Darboe and his brother Balagie Darboe, who played in the Trigoria academy during the same period as Bah.

== Honours ==
Roma

- Campionato Nazionale Under-17 : 2022–23
