= Jan Oliveras =

Spanish footballer (born 2004)

Personal information
- Full name: Jan Oliveras Codina
- Date of birth: 7 July 2004 (age 22)
- Place of birth: Manresa, Spain
- Height: 1.72 m (5 ft 8 in)
- Position: Left-back

Team information
- Current team: Celta B
- Number: 14

Youth career
- –2016: Espanyol
- 2016–2020: Barcelona
- 2020–2024: Roma

Senior career*
| Years | Team | Apps | (Gls) |
| 2022–2025 | Roma | 0 | (0) |
| 2024–2025 | → Dinamo Zagreb (loan) | 0 | (0) |
| 2025– | Celta B | 21 | (0) |

International career^{‡}
| 2021 | Spain U18 | 5 | (0) |
| 2022–2023 | Spain U19 | 3 | (0) |
- * Club domestic league appearances and goals as of 15 August 2026 ‡ National team caps and goals as of 31 August 2024

Jan Oliveras Codina (born 7 July 2004) is a Spanish footballer who plays as a left-back for Segunda División club Celta Fortuna.

== Club career ==
Born in Manresa, Barcelona, Catalonia, Oliveras joined the youth academy of Spanish side Espanyol. In 2016, he joined the youth academy of Spanish La Liga side Barcelona and, in 2020, he joined the youth academy of Italian Serie A side Roma. He was described as an "established starter" during the 2022–23 season while playing for them.

In 2024, he almost signed for Saudi Pro League side Al-Ittihad, after the move failed, he was sent on loan to Croatian SuperSport HNL side Dinamo Zagreb for the 2024–25 season.

On 13 August 2025, Oliveras moved back to his native Spain, and joined La Liga club Celta on a free transfer, initially assigned to the reserve team Celta Fortuna. He made his professional debut with the B's on 15 August of the following year, replacing Joel López in a 0–0 away draw against Cádiz CF.

== International career ==
Oliveras is a Spain youth international. He has played for the Spain national under-18 football team and the Spain national under-19 football team. He made five appearances and scored zero goals while playing for the Spain national under-18 football team. He made three appearances and scored zero goals while playing for the Spain national under-19 football team.

== Style of play ==
Oliveras mainly operates as a defender. He is left-footed. He specifically operates as a left-back. He can also operate as a left midfielder, as a central midfielder, and as a left-winger.
