= Riccardo Pagano =

Italian footballer (born 2004)

Personal information
- Date of birth: 28 November 2004 (age 21)
- Place of birth: Tivoli, Italy
- Height: 1.75 m (5 ft 9 in)
- Position: Attacking midfielder

Team information
- Current team: Cesena
- Number: 10

Youth career
- –2014: Villanova Calcio
- 2014–2023: Roma

Senior career*
Years	Team	Apps	(Gls)
2023–2026	Roma	4	(0)
2024–2025	→ Catanzaro (loan)	20	(0)
2025–2026	→ Bari (loan)	22	(0)
2026–	Cesena	0	(0)

International career^{‡}
2019	Italy U15	7	(1)
2019–2020	Italy U16	9	(0)
2021–2022	Italy U18	6	(1)
2022	Italy U19	2	(0)
2023	Italy U20	3	(0)
- * Club domestic league appearances and goals as of 12 May 2026 ‡ National team caps and goals as of 13 October 2023

Riccardo Pagano (born 28 November 2004) is an Italian professional footballer who plays as an attacking midfielder for Serie B club Cesena.

== Club career ==
Born in Tivoli, Lazio, Riccardo Pagano joined the Roma academy as a 9 years old, from ASD Villanova Calcio, in Guidonia Montecelio.

Soon emerging as a leader with Roma youth teams, wearing the number 10 and the captain armband, he signed a contract with the agency of Roma legend Francesco Totti on the summer 2020.

Having established himself as standout with Roma's primavera—a team that won the 2023 Coppa Primavera—, he was first called by José Mourinho in May 2023, appearing on the bench against Fiorentina in Serie A.

He was again included in the professional squad for the pre-season 2023–24, showing his attacking qualities in the summer friendlies.

On 8 July 2025, Pagano moved on loan to Bari in Serie B, with an option to buy.

== International career ==
Riccardo Pagano is a youth international for Italy, playing with as a captain since the under-16s in 2020, progressing until the under-19s in 2022.

== Style of play ==
Pagano is an attacking midfielder, able to vary his game and score in front of the goal. he is ambipedal and he is also a free kick specialist.

An offensively-minded midfielder, Pagano is also able to play as a second striker or in a more central midfield position.
