= Alessandro Di Nunzio =

Italian footballer (born 2007)

Personal information
- Date of birth: 21 April 2007 (age 19)
- Place of birth: Rome, Italy
- Height: 1.84 m (6 ft 0 in)
- Position: Midfielder

Team information
- Current team: Roma
- Number: 63

Youth career
- 2012–2016: Olimpia
- 2016–: Roma

Senior career*
Years	Team	Apps	(Gls)
2026–	Roma	1	(0)

International career^{‡}
2022	Italy U15	6	(1)
2022–2023	Italy U16	20	(3)
2023–2024	Italy U17	21	(1)
2024–2025	Italy U18	8	(1)
2025–2026	Italy U19	7	(0)
2026–	Italy U20	2	(0)
2026–	Italy U21	1	(0)
Medal record
Men's football
Representing Italy
UEFA European Under-17 Championship
Winner	2024 Cyprus
- * Club domestic league appearances and goals as of 24 October 2026 ‡ National team caps and goals as of 8 June 2026

Alessandro Di Nunzio (born 21 April 2007) is an Italian professional footballer who plays as a midfielder for Serie A club Roma.

== Club career ==
Born in Rome, Di Nunzio started playing football for Olimipa before joining the youth academy of Serie A club Roma in 2014. Due to his resemblances with the team's legend Daniele De Rossi and Francesco Totti, he was given the nickname the nickname "the chosen one". In the 2022–23 season, he helped Roma won the U-16 National Championship.

On 19 September 2023, Di Nunzio signed his first professional contract with Roma. He joined Roma's first team pre-season camp in summer 2026 and scored a goal in the friendly match against Cannes.

== International career ==
Di Nunzio was part of Italy U17's squad that won the 2024 European Championship.

In 2025, Di Nunzio was selected to play the FIFA U-20 World Cup with Italy.

== Honours ==
Italy U17

- UEFA European Under-17 Championship: 2024
