= Antonio Arena =

Italian footballer (born 2009)

Personal information
- Full name: Antonio Arena
- Date of birth: 10 February 2009 (age 17)
- Place of birth: Sydney, Australia
- Height: 1.88 m (6 ft 2 in)
- Position: Striker

Team information
- Current team: Roma
- Number: 68

Youth career
- M&U Football Academy
- Western Sydney Wanderers
- 2022–2025: Pescara
- 2025–: Roma

Senior career*
Years	Team	Apps	(Gls)
2024–2025	Pescara	4	(1)
2025–	Roma	2	(0)

International career^{‡}
2024	Australia U16	1	(0)
2025	Italy U16	2	(1)
2025	Italy U17	14	(3)
2025–	Italy U18	8	(3)
2026–	Italy U19	6	(0)
Medal record
Men's football
Representing Italy
FIFA U-17 World Cup
Third place	2025 Qatar
- * Club domestic league appearances and goals as of 22 March 2026 ‡ National team caps and goals as of 11 November 2026

Antonio Arena (born 10 February 2009) is a professional footballer who plays as a striker for Serie A club Roma. Born in Australia of Italian descent, he has represented both Australia and Italy at youth international level, having most recently appeared for the Italy national under-18 team.

== Club career ==
Arena is a youth product of the Australians clubs M&U Football Academy and Western Sydney Wanderers, before moving to Pescara in 2022 to finish his development. On 15 February 2025, he signed his first professional contract until 2028. He made his senior and professional debut with Pescara in a 4–1 Serie C win over Lucchese, and scored his side's fourth goal. At 16 years and 25 days old, he became the first 2009-born player to score in professional football in Italy, and also the youngest ever goalscorer for Pescara, beating the record of Marco Verratti.

On 23 July 2025, Arena signed for Serie A club Roma.

On 13 January 2026, Arena made his first-team debut for Roma in the round of 16 of the Coppa Italia, in a 3–2 defeat against Torino, scoring his first goal for the club with his first touch of the ball.

== International career ==
Born in Australia, Arena is of Italian descent through his grandparents from Taurianova. He holds dual Australian-Italian citizenship. He debuted with the Australia U16s in a friendly 4–3 win over the Switzerland U16s on 16 April 2024. In January 2025, he was called up to the Italy U16s for a set of friendlies.

Arena was a member of the Italy U17s' squad in their third place campaign at the 2025 FIFA U-17 World Cup, scoring two goals in seven appearances.

== Career statistics ==
=== Club ===
As of match played 22 March 2026

Appearances and goals by club, season and competition
Club	Season	League			National cup (Note: Includes Coppa Italia)		Europe		Other		Total	
Club	Season	Division	Apps	Goals	Apps	Goals	Apps	Goals	Apps	Goals	Apps	Goals
Pescara	2024–25	Serie C	4	1	0	0	—		1 (Note: Appearance in Serie C promotion play-offs)	0	5	1
Roma	2025–26	Serie A	2	0	1	1	0	0	—		3	1
Career total			6	1	1	1	0	0	1	0	8	2

== Honours ==
Italy U17

- FIFA U-17 World Cup third place: 2025
