= AS Roma Youth Sector =

Roma Primavera
- Full name: Associazione Sportiva Roma S.p.A. – Primavera
- Nicknames: i Giallorossi (The Yellow-Reds); La Magica (The Magic One) i Lupi (The Wolves)
- Ground: Stadio Tre Fontane; Rome, Italy
- Capacity: 5,000
- President: Dan Friedkin
- Head coach: Mattia Scala
- League: Campionato Primavera 1
- 2024–25: Campionato Primavera 1, Semifinals
- Website: www.asroma.it
Home colours	Away colours

AS Roma Youth Sector is the youth set-up of Italian club AS Roma. The under-20 team (Primavera) currently competes in the Campionato Primavera 1, as well as the Coppa Italia Primavera, and regularly compete in the continental UEFA Youth League (2014–15, 2015–16 and 2016–17).

Roma Primavera have enjoyed much success over the years, winning the Campionato Nazionale Primavera eight times, the Coppa Italia Primavera five times and Torneo di Viareggio thrice.

Players to have graduated from the AS Roma Primavera squad include Bruno Conti, Agostino Di Bartolomei, Giuseppe Giannini, Daniele De Rossi and record appearance holder and record goalscorer Francesco Totti.

== Associated clubs ==
AS Roma Primavera are associated with many local clubs and football schools and others across Italy and abroad. Most notably, the Totti Soccer School, L'Aquila and Serie D side, F.C. Rieti, whose home stadium Stadio Centro d'Italia – Manlio Scopigno is used by the Primavera for select matches including the UEFA Youth League.

== Players ==
=== Current squad ===
As of 24 October 2026

Note: Flags indicate national team as defined under FIFA eligibility rules; some limited exceptions apply. Players may hold more than one non-FIFA nationality.

No.	Pos.	Nation	Player
1	GK	ITA	Alessio Marcaccini
2	DF	ITA	Tommaso Marchetti
3	DF	ITA	Samuele Carlaccini
4	DF	ROU	Daniele Paul
5	DF	ITA	Raul Zinni
6	DF	ITA	Filippo Basile
7	MF	ITA	Valerio Maccaroni
8	MF	ITA	Francesco Panico
9	FW	ITA	Antonio Arena
10	MF	ITA	Alessandro Di Nunzio (captain)
11	FW	ITA	Edoardo Morucci
12	GK	HUN	Levente Kilvinger
13	DF	ITA	Giampaolo Bonifazi
14	MF	ITA	Mirko Loreti
15	MF	ITA	Luca Pallassini
16	MF	ITA	Giacomo Arduini

No.	Pos.	Nation	Player
17	FW	GUI	Mandjou Camara
18	MF	BRA	Pietro Falcetta
19	MF	ITA	Gioele Giammattei
21	MF	ITA	Mattia Guaglianone
22	DF	ITA	Cristian Cama (vice-captain)
23	DF	ITA	Federico Terlizzi
24	GK	TUN	Slim Bouaskar
25	DF	ITA	Lorenzo Dattilo
26	MF	ITA	Francesco Ballarin
28	MF	ITA	Matteo Forni
29	FW	ESP	Miguel Romero
30	MF	MNE	Andrija Vukoje
32	FW	ITA	Lorenzo Paratici (on loan from Sampdoria)
36	MF	ITA	Nicolò Troiani
69	MF	GAM	Muhammed Bah

=== Reserve team ===
Note: Flags indicate national team as defined under FIFA eligibility rules; some limited exceptions apply. Players may hold more than one non-FIFA nationality.

No.	Pos.	Nation	Player
31	DF	ITA	Cristian Cioffi
33	DF	ITA	Giacomo Strata
34	FW	ITA	Lorenzo Dal Bon

No.	Pos.	Nation	Player
35	MF	ITA	Davide Di Mascio
40	GK	ITA	Edoardo Sala

=== Other players under contract ===
Note: Flags indicate national team as defined under FIFA eligibility rules; some limited exceptions apply. Players may hold more than one non-FIFA nationality.

No.	Pos.	Nation	Player
—	MF	ITA	Francesco Ferrara
—	MF	ITA	Cristian Virgilio

== Staff ==
- Head coach: Mattia Scala
- Assistant coach: Gaetano D'Agostino

== Honours ==
AS Roma Primavera honours
Type	Competition	Titles	Seasons/Years
Domestic	Campionato Nazionale Primavera	8	1972–73, 1973–74, 1977–78, 1983–84, 1989–90, 2004–05, 2010–11, 2015–16
Domestic	Coppa Italia Primavera	6	1974, 1975, 1994, 2012, 2017, 2023
Domestic	Supercoppa Primavera	3	2012, 2016, 2023
Worldwide	Torneo di Viareggio	3	1981, 1983, 1991
