= El Aynaoui =

El Aynaoui (Arabic: العيناوي) is a Moroccan surname. Notable people with the surname include:

- Neil El Aynaoui (born 2001), Moroccan footballer
- Younes El Aynaoui (born 1975), Moroccan coach and former professional tennis player
