= Pietro Pellegri =

Italian association football player

Personal information
- Full name: Pietro Pellegri
- Date of birth: 17 March 2001 (age 25)
- Place of birth: Genoa, Italy
- Height: 1.89 m (6 ft 2 in)
- Position: Striker

Team information
- Current team: Torino
- Number: 9

Youth career
- 2011–2016: Genoa

Senior career*
Years	Team	Apps	(Gls)
2016–2018	Genoa	9	(3)
2018	Monaco B	1	(0)
2018–2022	Monaco	22	(2)
2021–2022	→ Milan (loan)	6	(0)
2022	→ Torino (loan)	9	(1)
2022–	Torino	42	(3)
2024–2026	→ Empoli (loan)	23	(6)

International career^{‡}
2015–2016	Italy U15	4	(0)
2015–2016	Italy U16	11	(1)
2016–2017	Italy U17	13	(1)
2017	Italy U19	1	(0)
2021–2023	Italy U21	8	(3)
2020	Italy	1	(0)
- * Club domestic league appearances and goals as of 13 May 2026 ‡ National team caps and goals as of 28 June 2023

Pietro Pellegri (Italian pronunciation: [ˈpjɛːtro pelˈleːɡri]; born 17 March 2001) is an Italian professional footballer who plays as a striker for Serie A club Torino. He has been capped once by the Italy national team.

In 2016, at the age of 15 years and 280 days, Pellegri joined Amedeo Amadei as the joint-youngest player to appear in Serie A at the time.

== Club career ==
=== Genoa ===
Born in Genoa, Pellegri is a youth product of the Genoa youth academy. On 22 December 2016, he made his debut with the senior team in Serie A in a 1–0 away loss against Torino, coming on as an 88th-minute substitute for Tomás Rincón. At the age of 15 years and 280 days, he equalled the record as the youngest ever Serie A debutant, held by Roma's Amedeo Amadei since 1937 (Wisdom Amey would later surpass this record on his debut for Bologna in 2021). In doing so he also became the first player born in the 21st century to appear in Serie A, and the second player born in the 2000s to make his Italian top-flight debut after Moise Kean. On 28 May, he scored his first Serie A goal in a 3–2 away loss against Roma, becoming the first player born in the 21st century to ever score in Serie A, and the third youngest goalscorer ever in the Italian top flight, after Amadei and Gianni Rivera.

On 17 September 2017, he became the first 16-year-old to score twice in a single major European league game in a 3–2 home loss to Lazio; his brace also made him the youngest player ever in Serie A to have managed to do so.

=== Monaco ===
On 27 January 2018, Pellegri signed with Monaco for a reported fee of €25 million, the second largest transfer fee for a 16-year-old. He made his Monaco debut on 16 February in a 4–0 home win against Dijon in Ligue 1, coming on for the final four minutes in place of Keita Baldé. At 16 years, 10 months and 30 days, he became the youngest league player in the club's history, breaking Kylian Mbappé's record by eleven days and receiving congratulations from the French forward.

On 26 August, he scored his first goal for Monaco to equalise in a 2–1 loss at Bordeaux. As a result, he became the first player born in the 21st century to score in France's top division.

==== Loan to AC Milan ====
On 25 August 2021, AC Milan announced the signing of Pellegri from Monaco on a temporary loan basis, with the option to make the deal permanent, which becomes an obligation if certain conditions are met.

After making only six appearances with the first team, AC Milan terminated the loan deal on 27 January 2022.

==== Loan to Torino ====
On 27 January 2022, Torino signed Pellegri on loan from AS Monaco, with an option to buy.

=== Torino ===
On 28 June 2022, Torino signed Pellegri on a permanent deal.

The fastest injury in an Association Football game

On November 6, 2022, while playing for Torino against Bologna in a Serie A match, he suffered the fastest injury ever recorded in a professional association football match, that occurred 2.3 seconds after kick-off. Immediately from the opening whistle, Torino kicked the ball long. Pellegri chased down the pitch to contest the aerial ball, but on his very first stride, his foot caught awkwardly on the grass, causing him to severely sprain his ankle.

==== Loan to Empoli ====
On 30 August 2024, Pellegri was loaned out to fellow Serie A club Empoli for the 2024–25 season. On 8 December 2024, Pellegri came off injured during Empoli's game against Verona, and was later found to have ruptured the ACL in his left knee. On 9 July 2025, the loan was renewed for the 2025–26 season, with a conditional option to buy. In January 2026, Pellegri successfully underwent surgery to reconstruct the ACL of his right knee, using the same surgeon from his previous ACL treatment, Ramon Cugat.

== International career ==
With the Italy under-17 team, Pellegri took part at the 2017 UEFA European Under-17 Championship, scoring once.

He was given his first senior international call-up for Italy in September 2018 by manager Roberto Mancini for Italy's opening UEFA Nations League matches against Poland and Portugal later that month. He missed the matches through a minor injury.

Pellegri made his senior debut for Italy on 11 November 2020, aged 19, featuring as a substitute in a friendly match won 4–0 against Estonia in Florence.

== Personal life ==
Pellegri is the son of Genoa assistant manager and team administrator Marco Pellegri. He has stated that his idol and main influence is Zlatan Ibrahimović, whom he hailed as the best striker in the world.

== Career statistics ==
=== Club ===
As of match played 7 December 2025

Appearances and goals by club, season and competition
Club	Season	League			National cup (Note: Includes Coppa Italia and Coupe de France)		League cup (Note: Includes Coupe de la Ligue)		Europe		Other		Total	
Club	Season	Division	Apps	Goals	Apps	Goals	Apps	Goals	Apps	Goals	Apps	Goals	Apps	Goals
Genoa	2016–17	Serie A	3	1	0	0	—		—		—		3	1
Genoa	2017–18	Serie A	6	2	1	0	—		—		—		7	2
Genoa	Total		9	3	1	0	—		—		—		10	3
Monaco	2017–18	Ligue 1	3	0	0	0	0	0	—		—		3	0
Monaco	2018–19	Ligue 1	3	1	0	0	0	0	0	0	0	0	3	1
Monaco	2019–20	Ligue 1	0	0	0	0	0	0	—		—		0	0
Monaco	2020–21	Ligue 1	16	1	1	0	—		—		—		17	1
Monaco	Total		22	2	1	0	0	0	0	0	0	0	23	2
AC Milan (loan)	2021–22	Serie A	6	0	0	0	—		—		—		6	0
Torino (loan)	2021–22	Serie A	9	1	—		—		—		—		9	1
Torino	2022–23	Serie A	18	2	2	2	—		—		—		20	4
Torino	2023–24	Serie A	24	1	2	0	—		—		—		26	1
Torino	Total		51	4	4	2	0	0	0	0	0	0	55	6
Empoli (loan)	2024–25	Serie A	11	3	1	0	—		—		—		12	3
Empoli (loan)	2025–26	Serie B	10	3	0	0	—		—		—		10	3
Empoli (loan)	Total		21	6	1	0	0	0	0	0	0	0	22	6
Career total			109	15	7	2	0	0	0	0	0	0	116	17

=== International ===
As of match played 11 November 2020

Appearances and goals by national team and year
National team	Year	Apps	Goals
Italy	2020	1	0
Total		1	0
