= 2024–25 Empoli FC season =

Empoli
2024–25 season
- Owner: Fabrizio Corsi
- President: Fabrizio Corsi
- Head coach: Roberto D'Aversa
- Stadium: Stadio Carlo Castellani
- Serie A: 18th (relegated)
- Coppa Italia: Semi-finals
- Top goalscorer: League: Sebastiano Esposito (8); All: Sebastiano Esposito (10)
- Highest home attendance: 15,715 vs Juventus; 14 September 2024, Serie A
- Lowest home attendance: 1,449 vs Udinese; 25 November 2024, Serie A
- Average home league attendance: 11,162
- Biggest win: 4–1 vs Catanzaro (H); 10 August 2024, Coppa Italia; 1–4 vs Hellas Verona (A); 8 December 2024, Serie A
- Biggest defeat: 0–5 vs Atalanta (H); 23 February 2025, Serie A
Home colours	Away colours	Third colours

The 2024–25 season was the 125th season in the history of Empoli FC, and it was also their fourth consecutive season in Serie A. In addition to the domestic league, the team participated in the Coppa Italia.

On the final day of the season, Empoli were relegated to Serie B following a defeat to Hellas Verona.

== Squad ==
As of 11 February 2025

Note: Flags indicate national team as defined under FIFA eligibility rules; some limited exceptions apply. Players may hold more than one non-FIFA nationality.

No.	Pos.	Nation	Player
1	GK	ITA	Marco Silvestri
2	DF	GEO	Saba Goglichidze
3	DF	ITA	Giuseppe Pezzella
5	MF	ITA	Alberto Grassi
6	MF	SCO	Liam Henderson
7	DF	FRA	Junior Sambia (on loan from Salernitana)
8	MF	ENG	Tino Anjorin
9	FW	ITA	Pietro Pellegri (on loan from Torino)
10	MF	ITA	Jacopo Fazzini
11	FW	GHA	Emmanuel Gyasi
12	GK	ITA	Jacopo Seghetti
13	DF	NZL	Liberato Cacace
15	DF	GEO	Saba Sazonov (on loan from Torino)
17	FW	NOR	Ola Solbakken (on loan from Roma)

No.	Pos.	Nation	Player
18	FW	CIV	Christian Kouamé (on loan from Fiorentina)
20	MF	UKR	Viktor Kovalenko
21	DF	ITA	Mattia Viti (on loan from Nice)
22	DF	ITA	Mattia De Sciglio (on loan from Juventus)
23	GK	COL	Devis Vásquez (on loan from AC Milan)
24	DF	NGR	Tyronne Ebuehi
27	MF	POL	Szymon Żurkowski (on loan from Spezia)
29	FW	ITA	Lorenzo Colombo (on loan from AC Milan)
32	MF	SUI	Nicolas Haas
34	DF	ALB	Ardian Ismajli
35	DF	ITA	Luca Marianucci
93	MF	MAR	Youssef Maleh (on loan from Lecce)
98	GK	ITA	Federico Brancolini
99	FW	ITA	Sebastiano Esposito (on loan from Inter Milan)

== Transfers ==
=== Summer window ===
==== In ====
Date	Pos.	Player	From	Fee	Notes	Ref.
30 June 2024	GK	(Italy) Valerio Biagini	(Italy) Livorno	Free	End of loan	
30 June 2024	FW	(Sweden) Emmanuel Ekong	(Croatia) Istra	Free	End of loan	
30 June 2024	MF	(Switzerland) Nicolas Haas	(Switzerland) Luzern	Free	End of loan	
30 June 2024	MF	(Scotland) Liam Henderson	(Italy) Palermo	Free	End of loan	
30 June 2024	DF	(Italy) Luca Marianucci	(Italy) Pro Sesto	Free	End of loan	
7 August 2024	GK	(Italy) Federico Brancolini	(Italy) Lecce	Free		
29 August 2024	MF	(England) Tino Anjorin	(England) Chelsea	Free		

==== Loans in ====
Date	Pos.	Player	From	Fee	Notes	Ref.
17 July 2024	FW	(Italy) Sebastiano Esposito	(Italy) Inter Milan	Free	Option to buy for €5,000,000	
18 July 2024	GK	(Colombia) Devis Vásquez	(Italy) Milan	Free	Option to buy for €900,000	
22 July 2024	DF	(Italy) Mattia Viti	(France) Nice	Free	Option to buy for €6,000,000	
31 July 2024	FW	(Italy) Lorenzo Colombo	(Italy) Milan	Free	Option to buy for €7,000,000	
31 July 2024	MF	(Poland) Szymon Żurkowski	(Italy) Spezia	Free	Option to buy for €1,500,000	
14 August 2024	FW	(Norway) Ola Solbakken	(Italy) Roma	Free	Option to buy for €3,500,000	
29 August 2024	DF	(Italy) Mattia De Sciglio	(Italy) Juventus	Free		
30 August 2024	MF	(France) Junior Sambia	(Italy) Salernitana	Free		
30 August 2024	DF	(Georgia (country)) Saba Sazonov	(Italy) Torino	Free	Option to buy for €4,500,000	
30 August 2024	FW	(Italy) Pietro Pellegri	(Italy) Torino	Free	Option to buy for €3,500,000	

==== Out ====
Date	Pos.	Player	To	Fee	Notes	Ref.
30 June 2024	DF	(Italy) Lorenzo Tonelli	Retired			
30 June 2024	GK	(Albania) Etrit Berisha	Unattached	Free	End of contract	
30 June 2024	FW	(Italy) Mattia Destro	Unattached	Free	End of contract	
30 June 2024	FW	(Senegal) M'Baye Niang	(Morocco) Wydad Casablanca	Free	End of contract	
30 June 2024	MF	(Italy) Simone Bastoni	(Italy) Spezia	End of loan		
30 June 2024	DF	(Poland) Bartosz Bereszyński	(Italy) Sampdoria	End of loan		
30 June 2024	FW	(Italy) Nicolò Cambiaghi	(Italy) Atalanta	End of loan		
30 June 2024	FW	(Italy) Matteo Cancellieri	(Italy) Lazio	End of loan		
30 June 2024	GK	(Italy) Elia Caprile	(Italy) Napoli	End of loan		
30 June 2024	FW	(Italy) Alberto Cerri	(Italy) Como	End of loan		
30 June 2024	MF	(Ukraine) Viktor Kovalenko	(Italy) Atalanta	End of loan		
30 June 2024	MF	(Romania) Răzvan Marin	(Italy) Cagliari	End of loan		
1 July 2024	DF	(Italy) Nicolò Evangelisti	(Italy) AlbinoLeffe	Free		
1 July 2024	FW	(Italy) Davide Merola	(Italy) Pescara	€150,000		
8 July 2024	DF	(Italy) Sebastiano Luperto	(Italy) Cagliari	€3,500,000		
24 July 2024	MF	(Italy) Alessandro Renzi	(Italy) Arezzo	Undisclosed		
26 July 2026	DF	(Italy) Gabriele Indragoli	(Italy) Pianese	Undisclosed		
2 August 2024	DF	(Italy) Samuele Angori	(Italy) Pisa	€1,400,000		
8 August 2024	FW	(Italy) Riccardo Fini	(Italy) Trento	Undisclosed		
26 August 2024	FW	(Italy) Francesco Caputo	Retired	Free	Contract solved by mutual consent	
29 August 2024	DF	(Italy) Francesco Donati	(Italy) Ternana	Undisclosed		
30 August 2024	DF	(Poland) Sebastian Walukiewicz	(Italy) Torino	€5,000,000		
5 September 2024	MF	(Italy) Alessio Rossi	(Italy) Prato	Undisclosed		
26 September 2024	DF	(Italy) Giacomo Siniega	(Italy) Livorno	Free		

==== Loans out ====
Date	Pos.	Player	To	Fee	Notes	Ref.
1 July 2024	GK	(Slovenia) Lovro Stubljar	(Slovenia) Celje	Free	Option to buy for an undisclosed fee with buy-back clause	
12 July 2024	DF	(Italy) Matteo Morelli	(Italy) Follonica Gavorrano	Free		
2 August 2024	MF	(Italy) Duccio Degli Innocenti	(Italy) Spezia	Free	Option to buy for an €1,800,000 with buy-back clause	
4 August 2024	MF	(Italy) Lorenzo Ignacchiti	(Italy) Reggiana	Free		
29 August 2024	GK	(Italy) Niccolò Chiorra	(Italy) Carrarese	Free	Obligation to buy for an undisclosed fee under conditions	
29 August 2024	DF	(Italy) Gabriele Guarino	(Italy) Carrarese	Free		
30 August 2024	FW	(Albania) Stiven Shpendi	(Italy) Carrarese	Free		
30 August 2024	MF	(Slovenia) Petar Stojanović	(Italy) Salernitana	Free		
2 September 2024	FW	(Portugal) Herculano Nabian	(Portugal) União de Leiria	Free	Option to buy for an undisclosed fee	

=== Winter window ===
==== In ====
Date	Pos.	Player	From	Fee	Notes	Ref.
31 December 2024	GK	(Slovenia) Lovro Stubljar	(Slovenia) Celje	End of loan		
9 January 2025	MF	(Italy) Francesco Vallarelli	(Italy) Trento	Loan terminated early		
22 January 2025	FW	(Italy) Giuseppe Brugognone	(Italy) Sestri Levante	Loan terminated early		
30 January 2025	FW	(Portugal) Herculano Nabian	(Portugal) União de Leiria	Loan terminated early		
30 January 2025	GK	(Italy) Marco Silvestri	(Italy) Sampdoria	Undisclosed		
11 February 2025	MF	(Ukraine) Viktor Kovalenko	Unattached	Free	Contract solved by mutual consent	

==== Loans in ====
Date	Pos.	Player	From	Fee	Notes	Ref.
3 February 2025	FW	(Ivory Coast) Christian Kouamé	(Italy) Fiorentina	Free		

==== Out ====
Date	Pos.	Player	To	Fee	Notes	Ref.
29 January 2025	FW	(Sweden) Emmanuel Ekong	(Sweden) Malmö	€1,000,000		

==== Loans out ====
Date	Pos.	Player	To	Fee	Notes	Ref.
7 January 2025	MF	(Italy) Luca Belardinelli	(Italy) Südtirol	Free		
10 January 2025	GK	(Slovenia) Lovro Stubljar	(Slovenia) Domžale	Free		
10 January 2025	MF	(Italy) Francesco Vallarelli	(Italy) Giugliano	Free		
23 January 2025	FW	(Italy) Giuseppe Brugognone	(Italy) Foggia	Free		
30 January 2025	GK	(Italy) Samuele Perisan	(Italy) Sampdoria	Free		
31 January 2025	FW	(Portugal) Herculano Nabian	(Spain) Mérida	Free	Option to buy for an undisclosed fee	

== Friendlies ==
=== Pre-season ===
12 July 2024 Friendly	Empoli (Italy)	10–0	(Italy) Castelfiorentino
18:30

20 July 2024 Friendly	Empoli (Italy)	0–0	(Germany) FC Ingolstadt
18:00

26 July 2024 Friendly	Empoli (Italy)	2–0	(Italy) Spezia
15:00	Caputo 50'; Ekong 61'

3 August 2024 Friendly	Empoli (Italy)	0–2	(Italy) Sampdoria
18:00

== Competitions ==
=== Overall record ===
Competition	First match	Last match	Starting round	Final position	Record							
Competition	First match	Last match	Starting round	Final position	Pld	W	D	L	GF	GA	GD	Win %
Serie A	17 August 2024	25 May 2025	Matchday 1	17th	38	6	13	19	33	59	−26	15.79
Coppa Italia	10 August 2024	24 April 2025	First round	Semi-finals	6	2	2	2	10	10	+0	33.33
Total					44	8	15	21	43	69	−26	18.18

Source: Soccerway

=== Serie A ===
==== League table ====
Pos	Team	Pld	W	D	L	GF	GA	GD	Pts	Qualification or relegation
16	Parma	38	7	15	16	44	58	−14	36 (Note: Cagliari finished ahead of Parma on head-to-head points: Parma 2–3 Cagliari, Cagliari 2–1 Parma.)	
17	Lecce	38	8	10	20	27	58	−31	34	
18	Empoli (R)	38	6	13	19	33	59	−26	31	Relegation to Serie B
19	Venezia (R)	38	5	14	19	32	56	−24	29	Relegation to Serie B
20	Monza (R)	38	3	9	26	28	69	−41	18	Relegation to Serie B

Source: Serie A
Rules for classification: 1) Points; 2) Tiebreaker for Champions team and third relegated team; 3) Head-to-head points; 4) Head-to-head goal difference; 5) Goal difference; 6) Goals scored; 7) Draw.
(Note: Head-to-head record is used only after all the matches between the teams in question have been played)
(R) Relegated

==== Results summary ====
Overall								Home						Away					
Pld	W	D	L	GF	GA	GD	Pts	W	D	L	GF	GA	GD	W	D	L	GF	GA	GD
38	6	13	19	33	59	−26	31	2	7	10	10	26	−16	4	6	9	23	33	−10

Source: Worldfootball

==== Results by round ====
Round	1	2	3	4	5	6	7	8	9	10	11	12	13	14	15	16	17	18	19	20	21	22	23	24	25	26	27	28	29	30	31	32	33
Ground	H	A	A	H	A	H	A	H	A	H	H	A	H	A	A	H	A	H	A	H	A	H	A	H	A	H	A	H	A	A	H	A	
Result	D	W	D	D	W	D	L	L	D	L	W	D	D	L	W	L	L	L	D	L	L	D	L	L	L	L	D	L	L	D	D	L	
Position	16	7	7	8	5	6	10	11	10	12	11	10	10	10	10	11	12	12	12	14	16	15	17	17	17	18	18	18	18	18	18	19	

Updated to match(es) played on 15 April 2025. Source: Worldfootball
A = Away; H = Home; W = Win; D = Draw; L = Loss

==== Matches ====
The match schedule was released on 4 July 2024.

17 August 2024 1	Empoli	0–0	Monza	Empoli
20:45	Fazzini (yellow card) 67'	Report	D. Maldini (yellow card) 48'; Caldirola (yellow card) 67'	Stadium: Stadio Carlo Castellani; Attendance: 7,746; Referee: Michael Fabbri

25 August 2024 2	Roma	1–2	Empoli	Rome
20:45	Shomurodov 80'	Report	Maleh (yellow card) 26'; Gyasi 45'; Solbakken (yellow card) 58'; Colombo 61' (pen.); Cacace (yellow card) 84'	Stadium: Stadio Olimpico; Attendance: 67,517; Referee: Luca Zufferli

31 August 2024 3	Bologna	1–1	Empoli	Bologna
20:45	Fabbian 2'	Report	Gyasi 3'; Pezzella (yellow card) 55'; Vásquez (yellow card) 90+4'; Henderson (yellow card) 90+5'	Stadium: Stadio Renato Dall'Ara; Attendance: 25.960; Referee: Livio Marinelli

14 September 2024 4	Empoli	0–0	Juventus	Empoli
18:00	Pellegri (yellow card) 74'	Report	Bremer (yellow card) 62'; Thuram (yellow card) 72'	Stadium: Stadio Carlo Castellani; Attendance: 15,715; Referee: Marco Di Bello

20 September 2024 5	Cagliari	0–2	Empoli	Cagliari
18:30	Pavoletti (yellow card) 81'	Report	Colombo (yellow card) 12', (goal) 33'; Esposito 49'; Gyasi (yellow card) 64'	Stadium: Unipol Domus; Attendance: 15.225; Referee: Simone Sozza

29 September 2024 6	Empoli	0–0	Fiorentina	Empoli
18:00		Report	Comuzzo (yellow card) 90'	Stadium: Stadio Carlo Castellani; Attendance: 13.053; Referee: Gianluca Aureliano

6 October 2024 7	Lazio	2–1	Empoli	Rome
15:00	Zaccagni 45+4'; Rovella (yellow card) 45+5'; Castellanos (penalty missed) 51', (yellow card) 53'; Pedro 84'	Report	Esposito 9'; Pezzella (yellow card) 29'; Fazzini (yellow card) 31'; Gyasi (yellow card) 78'; Grassi (yellow card) 82'	Stadium: Stadio Olimpico; Attendance: 42,000; Referee: Giovanni Ayroldi

20 October 2024 8	Empoli	0–1	Napoli	Empoli
12:30	Grassi (yellow card) 33'; Haas (yellow card) 90+6'	Report	Zambo Anguissa (yellow card) 37'; Kvaratskhelia 63' (pen.); Di Lorenzo (yellow card) 76'	Stadium: Stadio Carlo Castellani; Attendance: 15,164; Referee: Rosario Abisso

27 October 2024 9	Parma	1–1	Empoli	Parma
12:30	Del Prato (yellow card) 16'; Hernani (yellow card) 50'; Charpentier 80'; Balogh (yellow card) 90+1'; Sohm (yellow card) 90+4'	Report	Anjorin (yellow card) 20'; Coulibaly 35' (o.g.); Ismajli (yellow card) 67'; Grassi (yellow card) 71'; Vásquez (yellow card) 82'; Pellegri (yellow card) 90+1'	Stadium: Stadio Ennio Tardini; Attendance: 17.802; Referee: Federico La Penna

30 October 2024 10	Empoli	0–3	Internazionale	Empoli
18:30 CET (UTC+1)	Goglichidze (red card) 31'; Cacace (yellow card) 38'	Report	Frattesi 50', 67'; Bastoni (yellow card) 62'; L. Martínez 79'	Stadium: Stadio Carlo Castellani; Attendance: 15,706; Referee: Matteo Marchetti

4 November 2024 11	Empoli	1–0	Como	Empoli
18:30 CEST	Pellegri 47'; Cacace (yellow card) 90+1'	Report		Stadium: Stadio Carlo Castellani; Attendance: 8.102; Referee: Marco Di Bello

8 November 2024 12	Lecce	1–1	Empoli	Lecce
20:45	Pierotti 77'	Report	Pellegri 33', (yellow card) 52'; Cacace (yellow card) 45+1'; Henderson (yellow card) 84'	Stadium: Stadio Via del mare Attendance: 23.907; Referee: Juan Luca Sacchi

25 November 2024 13	Empoli	1–1	Udinese	Empoli
18:30 CET (UTC+1)	Pellegri 23'; Henderson (yellow card) 37'; Ekong (yellow card) 85'; Anjorin (yellow card) 90+1'	Report	Kamara (yellow card) 8'; Bijol (yellow card) 27'; Davis 76'	Stadium: Stadio Carlo Castellani; Attendance: 1.449; Referee: Livio Marinelli

1 December 2024 14	Milan	3–0	Empoli	Milan
18:30	Morata 19'; Reijnders 44', 69'	Report		Stadium: San Siro; Attendance: 68,725; Referee: Federico Dionisi

8 December 2024 15	Hellas Verona	1–4	Empoli	Verona
15:00	Silva (yellow card) 12'; Tengstedt 35'; Ghilardi (yellow card) 40'	Report	Esposito 16', 19'; Cacace 32'; Colombo 42'; Maleh (yellow card) 74'; Henderson (yellow card) 90+2'	Stadium: Stadio Marcantonio Bentegodi; Attendance: 23,949; Referee: Marco Di Bello

13 December 2024 16	Empoli	0–1	Torino	Empoli
20:45 CET (UTC+1)	Grassi (yellow card) 80'; Pezzella (yellow card) 84'; De Sciglio (red card) 89'	Report	Masina (yellow card) 8'; Coco (yellow card) 12'; Adams 70'; Pedersen (yellow card) 84'	Stadium: Stadio Carlo Castellani; Attendance: 7.832; Referee: Kevin Bonacina

22 December 2024 17	Atalanta	3–2	Empoli	Bergamo
18:00 CET (UTC+1)	Zaniolo (yellow card) 22'; De Ketelaere 34', 86'; Lookman 45+1'	Report	Colombo 13'; Esposito 57' (pen.); R.D'Aversa (yellow card) 59'; Pezzella (yellow card) 64'	Stadium: Gewiss Stadium; Attendance: 22.163; Referee: Ermanno Feliciani

28 December 2024 18	Empoli	1–2	Genoa	Empoli
18:00 CET (UTC+1)	Esposito (penalty missed) 54', 74'; Gyasi (yellow card) 81'	Report	Badelj 46'; Thorsby (yellow card) 66'; Ekuban 68'; Vitinha (yellow card) 79'	Stadium: Stadio Carlo Castellani; Attendance: 12.657; Referee: Antonio Rapuano

4 January 2025 19	Venezia	1–1	Empoli	Venice
15:00 CET (UTC+1)	Pohjanpalo 5'; Šverko (yellow card) 39'	Report	Esposito 32', (yellow card) 62'; Viti (yellow card) 56'	Stadium: Stadio Pier Luigi Penzo; Attendance: 10.591; Referee: Juan Luca Sacchi

11 January 2025 20	Empoli	1–3	Lecce	Empoli
15:00 CET (UTC+1)	Cacace 47'	Report	Morente 6', (yellow card) 37'; Krstović 11', 90+1', (yellow card) 83'; Pierret (yellow card) 58'	Stadium: Stadio Carlo Castellani; Attendance: 9.096; Referee: Daniele Chiffi

19 January 2025 21	Internazionale	3–1	Empoli	Milan
20:45 CET (UTC+1)	L.Martínez 55'; Dumfries 79'; Thuram 89'	Report	Roberto D'Aversa (yellow card) 63'; Esposito 83'	Stadium: San Siro; Attendance: 61.230; Referee: Ermanno Feliciani

25 January 2025 22	Empoli	1–1	Bologna	Empoli
20:45 CET (UTC+1)	Colombo 24'; Henderson (yellow card) 36'; Grassi (yellow card) 40'; Pezzella (yellow card) 78'	Report	Domínguez 44'	Stadium: Stadio Carlo Castellani; Attendance: 10.321; Referee: Federico La Penna

2 February 2025 23	Juventus	4–1	Empoli	Turin
12:30 CET (UTC+1)	Kolo Muani 61', 64'; Vlahović 90+2'; Conceição 90+2'	Report	De Sciglio 4'; Gyasi (yellow card) 37'; Maleh (yellow card) 41' (yellow-red card) 84'	Stadium: Juventus Stadium; Attendance: 40.160; Referee: Luca Zufferli

8 February 2025 24	Empoli	0–2	Milan	Empoli
18:00 CET (UTC+1)	Henderson (yellow card) 45+3'; Grassi (yellow card) 62'; Marianucci (red card) 65'	Report	Félix (yellow card) 18'; Tomori (yellow card) 36' (yellow-red card); Giménez (yellow card) 65', (goal) 76'; Leão 68'	Stadium: Stadio Carlo Castellani; Attendance: 14.691; Referee: Luca Pairetto

16 February 2025 25	Udinese	3–0	Empoli	Udine
15:00 CET (UTC+1)	Ekkelenkamp 19', 65'; Thauvin 90+1'	Report		Stadium: Stadio Friuli; Attendance: 19.539; Referee: Daniele Doveri

23 February 2025 26	Empoli	0–5	Atalanta	Empoli
18:00 CET (UTC+1)		Report	Gyasi 27' (o.g.); Retegui 33'; Lookman 43', 55'; Carnesecchi (yellow card) 67'; Zappacosta 74'	Stadium: Stadio Carlo Castellani; Attendance: 9.176; Referee: Maurizio Mariani

2 March 2025 27	Genoa	1–1	Empoli	Genoa
15:00 CET (UTC+1)	Zanoli (yellow card) 45'; Vásquez 81'	Report	Grassi 36'; Colombo (yellow card) 37'; Maleh (yellow card) 45'; Henderson (yellow card) 79'	Stadium: Stadio Luigi Ferraris; Attendance: 31.295; Referee: Davide Massa

9 March 2025 28	Empoli	0–1	Roma	Empoli
18:00 CET (UTC+1)	Soulé 1'	Report		Stadium: Stadio Carlo Castellani; Attendance: 12.393; Referee: Marco Di Bello

15 March 2025 29	Torino	1–0	Empoli	Turin
20:45 CET (UTC+1)	Gineitis (yellow card) 49'; Vlašić 70'	Report		Stadium: Stadio Olimpico Grande Torino; Attendance: 20.402; Referee: Daniele Chiffi

29 March 2025 30	Como	1–1	Empoli	Como
15:00 CET (UTC+1)	Goldaniga (yellow card) 25'; Sergi (yellow card) 30'; Douvikas 61'	Report	Goglichidze (yellow card) 12'; Pezzella (yellow card) 67'; Henderson (yellow card) 69'; Kouamé 75'; Grassi (yellow card) 83'; Gyasi (yellow card) 84'; Fazzini (red card) 90+2'	Stadium: Stadio Giuseppe Sinigaglia; Attendance: 10.118; Referee: Maurizio Mariani

6 April 2025 31	Empoli	0–0	Cagliari	Empoli
15:00 CET (UTC+1)		Report	Luperto (yellow card) 49'; Palomino (yellow card) 61'; Augello (yellow card) 86'; Pavoletti (yellow card) 88'	Stadium: Stadio Carlo Castellani; Attendance: 16.284; Referee: Federico La Penna

14 April 2025 32	Napoli	3–0	Empoli	Naples
20:45 CET (UTC+1)	McTominay 18', 61'; Lukaku (yellow card) 42', (goal) 56'	Report	Goglichidze (yellow card) 87'	Stadium: Stadio Diego Armando Maradona; Referee: Giovanni Baccini

=== Coppa Italia ===
10 August 2024 First round	Empoli	4–1	Catanzaro	Empoli
20:45	Fazzini 8', 90+3'; Colombo 48'; Esposito 56'	Report	Bonini 13'; Scognamillo (yellow card) 45+1'; Pontisso (yellow card) 65'	Stadium: Stadio Carlo Castellani; Attendance: 1.738; Referee: Alberto Ruben Arena

24 September 2024 Second round	Torino	1–2	Empoli	Turin
21:00	Walukiewicz (yellow card) 42'; Coco (yellow card) 50'; Linetty (yellow card) 65'; Adams 74'	Report	Ekong 30'; De Sciglio (yellow card) 83'; Haas 90'	Stadium: Stadio Olimpico Grande Torino; Attendance: 12.334; Referee: Davide Ghersini

4 December 2024 Round of 16	Fiorentina	2–2 (3–4 p)	Empoli	Florence
21:00 CET	Kean 59'; Sottil 70'; Gosens (yellow card) 73'	Report	Ekong 4'; Marianucci (yellow card) 36'; Esposito 75'; Pezzella (yellow card) 82'	Stadium: Stadio Artemio Franchi; Attendance: 17,618; Referee: Antonio Giua
	Penalties
	Guðmundsson (penalty scored); Kouamé (penalty scored); Ranieri (penalty missed); Kean (penalty missed); Cataldi (penalty scored)		(penalty scored) Colombo; (penalty missed) Ekong; (penalty scored) Henderson; (penalty scored) Marianucci; (penalty scored) Esposito

26 February 2025 Quarter-final	Juventus	1–1 (2–4 p)	Empoli	Turin
21:00 CET	K. Thuram 66'; Locatelli (yellow card) 81'	Report	Maleh 24'; Henderson (yellow card) 65'; Goglichidze (yellow card) 74'; Esposito (yellow card) 79'	Stadium: Juventus Stadium; Attendance: 39.304; Referee: Francesco Forneau
	Penalties
	Vlahović (penalty missed); Kolo Muani (penalty scored); Locatelli (penalty scored); Yıldız (penalty missed)		(penalty scored) Henderson; (penalty scored) Kouamé; (penalty scored) Cacace; (penalty scored) Marianucci
