= Jan Ziółkowski =

Polish footballer

Personal information
- Date of birth: 5 June 2005 (age 21)
- Place of birth: Warsaw, Poland
- Height: 1.94 m (6 ft 4 in)
- Position: Centre-back

Team information
- Current team: Monza (on loan from Roma)
- Number: 4

Youth career
- 2014–2018: Wicher Kobyłka
- 2018–2022: Polonia Warsaw

Senior career*
Years	Team	Apps	(Gls)
2022–2024	Legia Warsaw II	38	(2)
2024–2025	Legia Warsaw	24	(1)
2025–	Roma	18	(0)
2026–	→ Monza (loan)	0	(0)

International career^{‡}
2023	Poland U18	2	(0)
2023	Poland U19	3	(0)
2024	Poland U20	5	(1)
2025–	Poland	3	(0)
- * Club domestic league appearances and goals as of 20:02, 1 June 2026 (UTC) ‡ National team caps and goals as of 11:40, 15 November 2025 (UTC)

Jan Ziółkowski (born 5 June 2005) is a Polish professional footballer who plays as a centre-back for Serie A club Monza, on loan from Roma, and the Poland national team.

== Club career ==
=== Early years ===
Ziółkowski grew up playing in the youth teams of Wicher Kobyłka and Polonia Warsaw. He transferred to Legia Warsaw in 2022. During the 2022–23 season, Ziółkowski played for the U-19 team in the Central Junior League and the club's reserve team in group I of the III liga.

=== Legia Warsaw ===
Ziółkowski made his first team debut on 5 May 2024 in a loss against Radomiak Radom. He started in the last two matches of the 2023–24 Ekstraklasa season. In September 2024, Ziółkowski extended his contract with Legia until 2026, with an option for an additional year. On 26 February 2025, he scored his debut goal on 26 February 2025, in a Polish Cup quarter-final match against Jagiellonia Białystok.

=== Roma ===
Ziółkowski joined Italian club Roma on 29 August 2025 for a fee of €6 million, taking the jersey number 24. On 24 October, he made his European debut for Roma in a 2025–26 UEFA Europa League match against Viktoria Plzeň. He scored his first goal for Roma in a 1–1 draw against Panathinaikos on the final matchday of the Europa League league phase, resulting in Roma finishing 8th in the table and progressing to the round of 16.

==== Loan to Monza ====
On 31 August 2026, Ziółkowski was sent on a one-year loan to Serie A club Monza with an option for purchase.

== International career ==
Ziółkowski played for Poland at under-18, under-19, and under-20 level between 2023 and 2024.

On 9 October 2025, Ziółkowski made his debut for the Poland national team in a friendly match against New Zealand.

== Career statistics ==
=== Club ===
As of match played 24 May 2026

Appearances and goals by club, season and competition
Club	Season	League			National cup (Note: Includes Polish Cup, Coppa Italia)		Europe		Other		Total	
Club	Season	Division	Apps	Goals	Apps	Goals	Apps	Goals	Apps	Goals	Apps	Goals
Legia Warsaw II	2022–23	III liga, gr. I	16	1	1	0	—		—		17	1
Legia Warsaw II	2023–24	III liga, gr. I	22	1	2	0	—		—		24	1
Legia Warsaw II	Total		38	2	3	0	—		—		41	2
Legia Warsaw	2023–24	Ekstraklasa	3	0	—		—		—		3	0
Legia Warsaw	2024–25	Ekstraklasa	19	1	3	1	6 (Note: Appearances in UEFA Conference League)	0	—		28	2
Legia Warsaw	2025–26	Ekstraklasa	2	0	—		6 (Note: Four appearances in UEFA Europa League, two appearances in UEFA Conference League)	0	1 (Note: Appearance in Polish Super Cup)	0	9	0
Legia Warsaw	Total		24	1	3	1	12	0	1	0	40	2
Roma	2025–26	Serie A	18	0	1	0	4 (Note: Appearances in UEFA Europa League)	1	—		23	1
Career total			80	3	7	1	16	1	1	0	104	5

=== International ===
As of match played 14 November 2025

Appearances and goals by national team and year
National team	Year	Apps	Goals
Poland
Poland	2025	3	0
Total		3	0

== Honours ==
Legia Warsaw

- Polish Cup: 2024–25
- Polish Super Cup: 2025

Legia Warsaw II

- Polish Cup (Masovia regionals): 2022–23

Individual

- Polish Newcomer of the Year: 2025
