= Devis Vásquez =

Colombian footballer (1998)

Personal information
- Full name: Devis Estiven Vásquez Llach
- Date of birth: 12 May 1998 (age 28)
- Place of birth: Barranquilla, Colombia
- Height: 1.95 m (6 ft 5 in)
- Position: Goalkeeper

Team information
- Current team: Roma
- Number: 32

Youth career
- Cortuluá
- 2016–2018: Patriotas
- 2018: → La Equidad (loan)
- 2019–2020: Llaneros
- 2020–2021: Guaraní
- 2023: AC Milan

Senior career*
Years	Team	Apps	(Gls)
2017–2018	Patriotas	0	(0)
2021–2023	Guaraní	28	(0)
2023–2025	AC Milan	0	(0)
2023–2024	→ Sheffield Wednesday (loan)	9	(0)
2024	→ Ascoli (loan)	10	(0)
2024–2025	→ Empoli (loan)	32	(0)
2025–	Roma	1	(0)
2026	→ Beşiktaş (loan)	1	(0)

International career^{‡}
2026–	Colombia	1	(0)
- * Club domestic league appearances and goals as of 22:33, 26 May 2026 (UTC) ‡ National team caps and goals as of 23:45, 17 November 2026 (UTC)

Devis Estiven Vásquez Llach (born 12 May 1998) is a Colombian professional footballer who plays as a goalkeeper for Serie A club Roma and the Colombia national team.

== Club career ==
=== Guaraní ===
Having played for the youth sectors of teams Cortuluá, Patriotas (with whom he received multiple first team call-ups), La Equidad and Llaneros, all in his native Colombia, he moved to Paraguay and joined Primera División club Guaraní's youth setup in 2020, Vásquez made his senior league debut in February 2021 against Olimpia. He saved a penalty in the final match of the 2021 Clausura season against Sportivo Luqueño. In 2022, Vásquez became the undisputed starting goalkeeper for Club Guaraní following the departure of the previously established number one Gaspar Servio on loan to Rosario Central, playing matches in both the league and the Copa Libertadores. His form was such that he was mentioned to be in the reckoning for a call-up to the Colombia national football team in January 2023. Part of Vázquez's good form was saving multiple penalties during a shootout to knock Libertad out of the semi-finals of the Copa Paraguay.

=== AC Milan ===
On 3 January 2023, Vásquez moved to Italy and signed for Serie A club AC Milan on a three-and-a-half-year contract.

On 25 July 2025, after returning from his loan-spell with Empoli during the 2024–25 season, Vásquez and AC Milan reached an agreement to terminate his contract with the club, making him a free agent ahead of the 2025–26 season.

==== Loan to Sheffield Wednesday ====
On 5 August 2023, Vásquez moved to England and joined recently promoted EFL Championship club Sheffield Wednesday on loan until 30 June 2024. He made his debut for the club on 8 August 2023, in the EFL Cup against Stockport County. The match was tied and went to a penalty shoot-out where Vásquez saved two penalties to help secure a win for his side. On 18 January 2024, he was recalled from his loan spell.

==== Loan to Ascoli ====
On 19 January 2024, Vásquez was loaned to Serie B club Ascoli for the rest of the season.

==== Loan to Empoli ====
On 18 July 2024, he was loaned to Serie A club Empoli, with an option to make the move permanent at the end of the 2024–25 season.

=== Roma ===
On 29 July 2025, Vásquez joined fellow Serie A club Roma as a free agent, signing a contract until 2027.

==== Loan to Beşiktaş ====
On 6 February 2026, Vásquez moved to Turkey and joined Süper Lig club Beşiktaş for the remainder of the season, with an option to make the deal permanent.

== International career ==
Vásquez was called up to the Colombia national team for the friendly matches against South Korea and Japan on 24 and 28 March 2023. He was called up once again for the 2026 FIFA World Cup qualification (CONMEBOL) matches against Venezuela and Chile on 7 and 12 September 2023, respectively.

Vásquez made his debut with Colombia on 17 November 2026, substituting Aldair Quintana at the second half of a goalless draw friendly match against Chile.

== Career statistics ==
As of match played 27 April 2026

Appearances and goals by club, season and competition
Club	Season	League			National cup (Note: Includes Coppa Italia)		League cup (Note: Includes EFL Cup)		Continental		Total	
Club	Season	Division	Apps	Goals	Apps	Goals	Apps	Goals	Apps	Goals	Apps	Goals
Patriotas	2016	Categoría Primera A	0	0	0	0	—		—		0	0
Patriotas	2017	Categoría Primera A	0	0	0	0	—		—		0	0
Patriotas	2018	Categoría Primera A	0	0	0	0	—		—		0	0
Patriotas	Total		0	0	0	0	—		—		0	0
Guaraní	2021	Paraguayan Primera División	3	0	0	0	—		1 (Note: Appearance(s) in Copa Libertadores)	0	4	0
Guaraní	2022	Paraguayan Primera División	25	0	0	0	—		2	0	27	0
Guaraní	Total		28	0	0	0	—		3	0	31	0
AC Milan	2022–23	Serie A	0	0	0	0	—		0	0	0	0
Sheffield Wednesday (loan)	2023–24	Championship	9	0	0	0	1	0	—		10	0
Ascoli (loan)	2023–24	Serie B	10	0	—		—		—		10	0
Empoli (loan)	2024–25	Serie A	32	0	2	0	—		—		34	0
Roma	2025–26	Serie A	0	0	0	0	—		—		0	0
Beşiktaş (loan)	2025–26	Süper Lig	1	0	0	0	—		—		1	0
Career total			80	0	2	0	1	0	3	0	86	0
