= Saba Goglichidze =

Georgian footballer (born 2004)

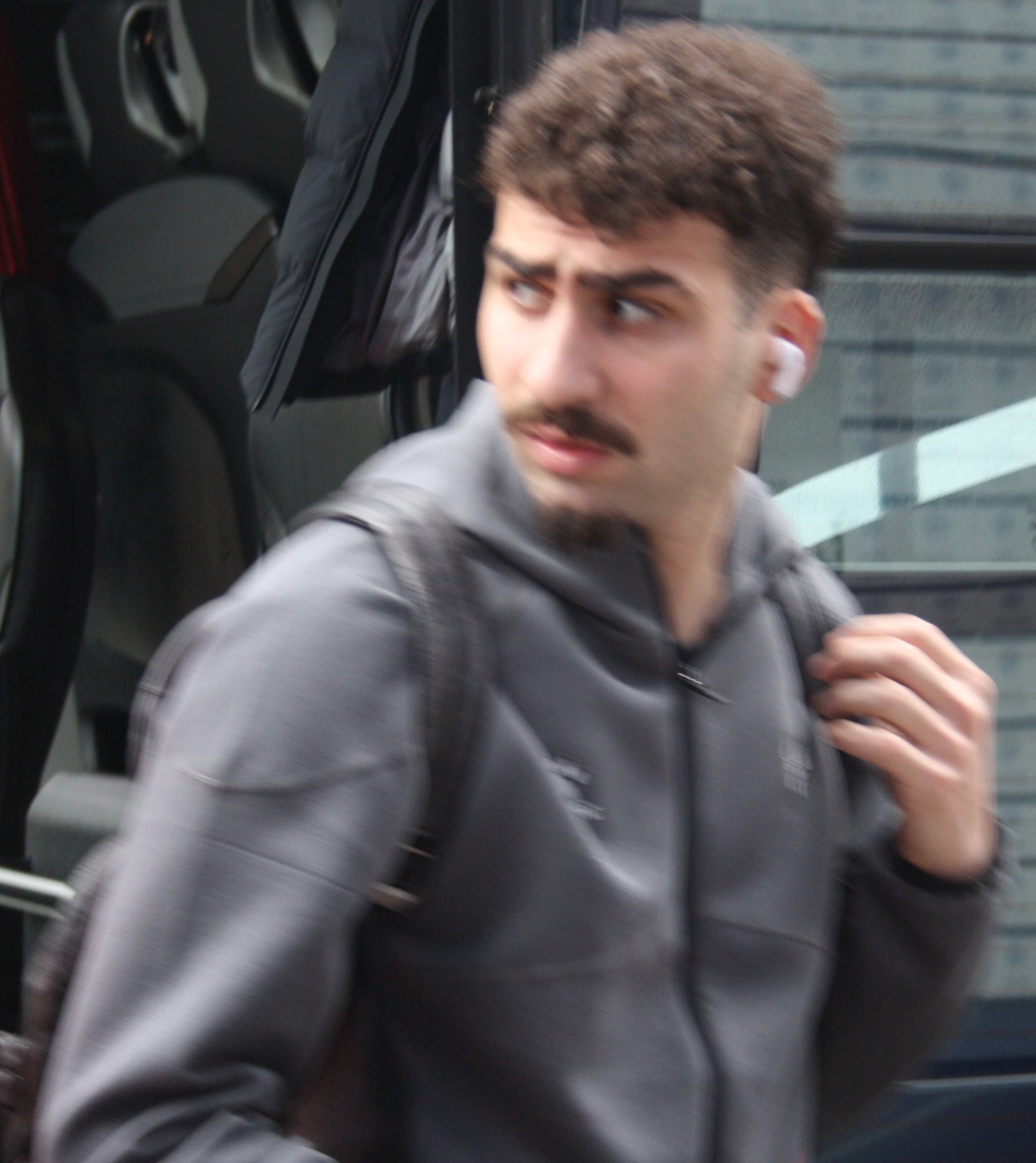
- Goglichidze in 2026

Personal information
- Date of birth: 25 June 2004 (age 22)
- Place of birth: Kutaisi, Georgia
- Height: 1.93 m (6 ft 4 in)
- Position: Defender

Team information
- Current team: Monza (on loan from Udinese)
- Number: 2

Senior career*
Years	Team	Apps	(Gls)
2021–2023	Torpedo Kutaisi	30	(0)
2024–2025	Empoli	33	(0)
2025–	Udinese	8	(0)
2026	→ Watford (loan)	12	(0)
2026–	→ Monza (loan)	1	(1)

International career^{‡}
2022	Georgia U18	7	(1)
2022	Georgia U19	4	(0)
2023–2024	Georgia U21	7	(0)
2024–	Georgia	15	(0)
- * Club domestic league appearances and goals as of 15:11, 12 October 2026 (UTC) ‡ National team caps and goals as of 18 November 2026

Saba Goglichidze (Georgian: საბა გოგლიჩიძე; born 25 June 2004) is a Georgian professional footballer who plays as a defender for Serie A club Monza, on loan from Udinese, and the Georgia national team.

Goglichidze made his debut with Torpedo Kutaisi, with whom he won the Georgian Cup in 2022.

== Early life ==
Goglichidze was born in 2004 in Georgia. His grandfather was a supporter of Georgian side Torpedo Kutaisi.

== Club career ==
Goglichidze started his career with Georgian side Torpedo Kutaisi. On 7 July 2021, he made a first league appearance for the club against Saburtalo. The next year, even though he did not feature in the final, Goglichidze was a member of the squad that won the national cup.

In 2024, he signed for Serie A side Empoli. Goglichidze made a debut for his new club in a 1–1 draw against Bologna on 31 August. After taking part in first four matches in full, the player received a first recognition as he was selected by Sofascore in U21 Team of the Month among the top five European leagues.

On 5 August 2025, Goglichidze signed a five-year contract with Udinese. On 2 February 2026, he signed for Watford on loan until the end of the season. On 1 September 2026, he was sent on a one-year loan to Serie A club Monza with an option for purchase.

== International career ==
Goglichidze made his debut for the Georgia national team on 7 September 2024 in a Nations League game against Czechia at the Mikheil Meskhi Stadium. He substituted Giorgi Gvelesiani in the 88th minute of Georgia's 4–1 victory.

== Style of play ==
Goglichidze mainly operates as a defender. He can play as a center-back and right-back.

== Career statistics ==
As of match played 11 October 2026

Appearances and goals by club, season and competition
Club	Season	League			National cup		Continental		Other		Total	
Club	Season	Division	Apps	Goals	Apps	Goals	Apps	Goals	Apps	Goals	Apps	Goals
Torpedo Kutaisi	2021	Erovnuli Liga	1	0	–		–		–		1	0
Torpedo Kutaisi	2022	Erovnuli Liga	15	0	2	0	–		–		17	0
Torpedo Kutaisi	2023	Erovnuli Liga	14	0	–		–		–		14	0
Torpedo Kutaisi	Total		30	0	2	0	0	0	0	0	32	0
Empoli	2024–25	Serie A	33	0	3	0	–		–		36	0
Udinese	2025–26	Serie A	8	0	1	0	–		–		9	0
Watford (loan)	2025–26	Championship	12	0	–		–		–		12	0
Monza (loan)	2026–27	Serie A	1	1	0	0	–		–		1	1
Career total			84	1	6	0	0	0	0	0	90	1

== Honours ==
Torpedo Kutaisi

- Georgian Cup: 2022
