= Radosław Żelezny =

Polish footballer (born 2005)

Personal information
- Full name: Radosław Dominik Żelezny
- Date of birth: 6 September 2006 (age 20)
- Place of birth: Wrocław, Poland
- Height: 1.93 m (6 ft 4 in)
- Position: Goalkeeper

Team information
- Current team: Perugia (on loan from Roma)
- Number: 1

Youth career
- –2022: FC Wrocław Academy
- 2022–2025: Juventus

Senior career*
Years	Team	Apps	(Gls)
2025–	Roma	0	(0)
2026–	→ Perugia (loan)	0	(0)
- * Club domestic league appearances and goals as of 11:05, 23 November 2025 (UTC)

Radosław Dominik Żelezny (born 6 September 2006) is a Polish professional footballer who plays as a goalkeeper for Serie C Group B club Perugia, on loan from Roma.

== Career ==
As a youth player, Żelezny joined local side FC Wrocław's academy. Following his stint there, he joined the academy of Italian side Juventus during the summer of 2022 after trialling for the academy of French side PSG.

Ahead of the 2025–26 season, Żelezny signed for Serie A side Roma.

On 10 August 2026, Żelezny was announced at Serie C side Perugia on a one-year loan deal.

== Style of play ==
Żelezny plays as a goalkeeper. Italian newspaper Corriere dello Sport wrote in 2025 that he "is a modern goalkeeper: 1.93 metres tall, left-footed, effective in coming out and in one-on-one duels, and skilled with his feet. While physically strong and reactive, there's still room for improvement in his high runs. His style has prompted comparisons to compatriot Wojciech Szczęsny".
