= 2025–26 AS Roma season =

Roma
2025–26 season
- Owner: The Friedkin Group
- President: Dan Friedkin
- Head coach: Gian Piero Gasperini
- Stadium: Stadio Olimpico
- Serie A: 3rd
- Coppa Italia: Round of 16
- UEFA Europa League: Round of 16
- Top goalscorer: League: Donyell Malen (14); All: Donyell Malen (15)
- Highest home attendance: 67,785 vs Genoa; 29 December 2025 (Serie A)
- Lowest home attendance: 50,152 vs Lazio; 17 May 2026 (Serie A)
- Average home league attendance: 61,796
- Biggest win: 4–0 vs Fiorentina (H); 4 May 2026 (Serie A)
- Biggest defeat: 2–5 vs Internazionale (A); 5 April 2026 (Serie A)
Home colours	Away colours	Third colours

The 2025–26 season was the 99th season in the history of Associazione Sportiva Roma, and the club's 74th consecutive season in the Italian top flight. In addition to the domestic league, the club also participated in the Coppa Italia and the UEFA Europa League.

== Season chronology ==
On 6 June 2025, long-time Atalanta manager Gian Piero Gasperini was announced to be the new head coach at Roma, taking over from club legend Claudio Ranieri. At the same time, Ranieri was promoted to "manager and senior advisor to ownership", and retired from football management. However, Ranieri would leave his role as advisor and depart Roma altogether on 24 April 2026, following a reported spat with Gasperini.

On 25 January 2026, in matchday 22 of the Serie A against Milan, Roma drew 1–1, marking their first league draw since 13 April 2025 against Lazio during matchday 32 of the previous campaign.

Despite sitting out of the top four since March, Roma ended the Serie A season with a five-match win streak, and on 24 May 2026, following a 2–0 win away at Hellas Verona on the final matchday, secured a third-place league finish, earning their first UEFA Champions League qualification since the 2018–19 season and the first under the Friedkin administration.

== Squad information ==
As of 25 May 2026

No.	Player	Nat.	Position(s)	Date of birth (age)	Signed from	Signed in	Contract ends	Apps.	Goals
Goalkeepers
91	Radosław Żelezny	(Poland)	GK	6 September 2006 (aged 19)	(Italy) Juventus	2025	2029	0	0
95	Pierluigi Gollini	(Italy)	GK	18 March 1995 (aged 31)	(Italy) Atalanta	2025	2027	1	0
99	Mile Svilar	(Serbia)	GK	27 August 1999 (aged 26)	(Portugal) Benfica	2022	2030	133	0
Defenders
2	Devyne Rensch	(Netherlands)	RB / LB	18 January 2003 (aged 23)	(Netherlands) Ajax	2025	2029	50	1
3	Angeliño	(Spain)	LB	4 January 1997 (aged 29)	(Germany) RB Leipzig	2024	2028	80	4
5	Evan Ndicka	(Ivory Coast)	CB	20 August 1999 (aged 26)	(Germany) Eintracht Frankfurt	2023	2028	127	6
12	Kostas Tsimikas	(Greece)	LB	12 May 1996 (aged 30)	(England) Liverpool (loan)	2025	2026	25	0
19	Zeki Çelik	(Turkey)	RB / CB	17 February 1997 (aged 29)	(France) Lille	2022	2026	151	2
22	Mario Hermoso	(Spain)	CB / LB	18 June 1995 (aged 31)	(Spain) Atlético Madrid	2024	2027	48	5
23	Gianluca Mancini	(Italy)	CB	17 April 1996 (aged 30)	(Italy) Atalanta	2019	2027	319	23
24	Jan Ziółkowski	(Poland)	CB	5 June 2005 (aged 21)	(Poland) Legia Warsaw	2025	2030	23	1
43	Wesley	(Brazil)	RB / LB	6 September 2003 (aged 22)	(Brazil) Flamengo	2025	2030	39	4
87	Daniele Ghilardi	(Italy)	CB	6 January 2003 (aged 23)	(Italy) Hellas Verona (loan)	2025	2026	28	0
Midfielders
4	Bryan Cristante (c)	(Italy)	DM / CM / CB	3 March 1995 (aged 31)	(Italy) Atalanta	2018	2027	364	21
7	Lorenzo Pellegrini (vc)	(Italy)	AM / CM	19 June 1996 (aged 30)	(Italy) Sassuolo	2017	2026	349	62
8	Neil El Aynaoui	(Morocco)	CM / DM	2 July 2001 (aged 24)	(France) Lens	2025	2030	34	2
17	Manu Koné	(France)	CM / DM	17 May 2001 (aged 25)	(Germany) Borussia Mönchengladbach	2024	2029	82	4
61	Niccolò Pisilli	(Italy)	CM / AM	23 September 2004 (aged 21)	(Italy) Roma Primavera	2023	2029	78	8
Forwards
9	Artem Dovbyk	(Ukraine)	CF	21 June 1997 (aged 29)	(Spain) Girona	2024	2029	63	20
11	Evan Ferguson	(Republic of Ireland)	CF	18 October 2004 (aged 21)	(England) Brighton & Hove Albion (loan)	2025	2026	22	5
14	Donyell Malen	(Netherlands)	CF / LW	19 January 1999 (aged 27)	(England) Aston Villa (loan)	2026	2026	20	15
18	Matías Soulé	(Argentina)	RW / AM	15 April 2003 (aged 23)	(Italy) Juventus	2024	2029	81	13
20	Lorenzo Venturino	(Italy)	RW / AM	22 June 2006 (aged 20)	(Italy) Genoa (loan)	2026	2026	10	0
21	Paulo Dybala	(Argentina)	AM / RW / CF	15 November 1993 (aged 32)	(Italy) Juventus	2022	2026	140	45
68	Antonio Arena	(Italy)	CF	10 February 2009 (aged 17)	(Italy) Roma Primavera	2025	2028	3	1
75	Mattia Della Rocca	(Italy)	LW / AM	13 January 2006 (aged 20)	(Italy) Roma Primavera	2026	2026	1	0
78	Robinio Vaz	(France)	CF	17 February 2007 (aged 19)	(France) Olympique de Marseille	2026	2030	14	1
92	Stephan El Shaarawy	(Italy)	LW / AM / LM	27 October 1992 (aged 33)	(China) Shanghai Shenhua	2021	2026	348	66
97	Bryan Zaragoza	(Spain)	LW / RW	9 September 2001 (aged 24)	(Germany) Bayern Munich (loan)	2026	2026	6	0

=== Out on loan ===
Note: Flags indicate national team as defined under FIFA eligibility rules; some limited exceptions apply. Players may hold more than one non-FIFA nationality.

No.	Pos.	Nation	Player
—	GK	ITA	Giorgio Stomeo (at Prato until 30 June 2026)
—	GK	COL	Devis Vásquez (at Beşiktaş until 30 June 2026)
—	DF	KSA	Saud Abdulhamid (at Lens until 30 June 2026)
—	DF	ALB	Marash Kumbulla (at Mallorca until 30 June 2026)
—	DF	ITA	Mattia Mannini (at Juve Stabia until 30 June 2026)
—	DF	ITA	Filippo Reale (at Avellino until 30 June 2026)
—	DF	MAR	Anass Salah-Eddine (at PSV until 30 June 2026)
—	DF	ESP	Buba Sangaré (at Elche until 30 June 2026)

No.	Pos.	Nation	Player
—	MF	ITA	Francesco Ferrara (at Sampdoria until 30 June 2026)
—	MF	ITA	Riccardo Pagano (at Bari until 30 June 2026)
—	MF	SUI	Alessandro Romano (at Spezia until 30 June 2026)
—	FW	ITA	Tommaso Baldanzi (at Genoa until 30 June 2026)
—	FW	ITA	Luigi Cherubini (at Sampdoria until 30 June 2026)
—	FW	ITA	Valerio Cinti (at Sampdoria until 30 June 2026)
—	FW	UZB	Eldor Shomurodov (at İstanbul Başakşehir until 30 June 2026)

== Transfers ==
=== Summer window ===
==== In ====
Date	Pos.	Player	From	Fee	Notes	Ref.
14 July 2025	FW	(Guinea) Mandjou Camara	(Italy) SPAL	Free	Joined Primavera squad	
20 July 2025	MF	(Morocco) Neil El Aynaoui	(France) Lens	€23,500,000	+ €1,500,000 add-ons	
23 July 2025	GK	(Poland) Radosław Żelezny	(Italy) Juventus	Free	From Primavera squad	
28 July 2025	DF	(Brazil) Wesley	(Brazil) Flamengo	€25,000,000	+ €5,000,000 add-ons	
22 July 2025	FW	(Italy) (Australia) Antonio Arena	(Italy) Pescara	€1,000,000	Joined Primavera squad	
29 July 2025	GK	(Colombia) Devis Vásquez	(Italy) Milan	Free	After contract termination	
29 August 2025	DF	(Poland) Jan Ziółkowski	(Poland) Legia Warsaw	€6,000,000		

==== Loans in ====
Date	Pos.	Player	From	Fee	Notes	Ref.
23 July 2025	FW	(Republic of Ireland) Evan Ferguson	(England) Brighton & Hove Albion	€3,000,000	With option to buy	
2 August 2025	DF	(Italy) Daniele Ghilardi	(Italy) Hellas Verona	€2,500,000	With conditional obligation to buy	
20 August 2025	FW	(Jamaica) Leon Bailey	(England) Aston Villa	€3,000,000	With option to buy	
31 August 2025	DF	(Greece) Kostas Tsimikas	(England) Liverpool	Free	—N/a	

==== Loan returns ====
Date	Pos.	Player	From	Fee	Notes	Ref.
30 June 2025	MF	(Italy) Edoardo Bove	(Italy) Fiorentina	—N/a	Option to buy not exercised	
30 June 2025	DF	(Spain) Mario Hermoso	(Germany) Bayer Leverkusen	—N/a	Option to buy not exercised	

Total spending: ▼€58M

==== Out ====
Date	Pos.	Player	To	Fee	Notes	Ref.
30 June 2025	DF	(Sweden) Samuel Dahl	(Portugal) Benfica	€9,000,000	From loan to definitive purchase	
30 June 2025	MF	(France) Enzo Le Fée	(England) Sunderland	€23,000,000	From loan to definitive purchase	
30 June 2025	MF	(Poland) Nicola Zalewski	(Italy) Internazionale	€6,300,000	From loan to definitive purchase	
1 July 2025	DF	(Germany) Mats Hummels	Retired			
10 July 2025	MF	(Argentina) Leandro Paredes	(Argentina) Boca Juniors	€3,000,000	—N/a	
15 July 2025	DF	(Slovenia) Lovro Golič	(Belgium) KV Mechelen	Free	From Primavera squad	
15 July 2025	DF	(Italy) William Feola	(Italy) Hellas Verona	Undisclosed	After return from loan, from Primavera squad	
17 July 2025	GK	(Italy) (Brazil) Renato Marin	(France) Paris Saint-Germain	Free	End of contract	
18 July 2025	GK	(Italy) Davide Mastrantonio	(Italy) Latina	Undisclosed	After return from loan	
24 July 2025	MF	(Italy) Leonardo Graziani	(Italy) Pescara	Undisclosed	From Primavera squad	
26 July 2025	FW	(Italy) Giulio Misitano	(Italy) Atalanta U23	Free	From Primavera squad	
29 July 2025	MF	(Croatia) Sergej Levak	(Italy) Atalanta U23	Free	From Primavera squad	
30 July 2025	DF	(Italy) (Belgium) Matteo Plaia	(Italy) Atalanta U23	€500,000	After return from loan	
30 July 2025	FW	(Italy) Andrea Ceccarelli	(Italy) Cittadella	Undisclosed	From Primavera squad	
1 August 2025	GK	(Italy) Pietro Boer	(Italy) Juve Stabia	Undisclosed	After return from loan	
1 August 2025	FW	(Argentina) Ricardo Solbes	(Argentina) Unión Santa Fe	Free	After return from loan, from Primavera squad	
2 August 2025	FW	(Italy) Manuel Nardozi	(Italy) Napoli	Undisclosed	After return from loan, from Primavera squad	
4 August 2025	FW	(Norway) Ola Solbakken	(Denmark) Nordsjælland	€950,000	After return from loan	
13 August 2025	DF	(Spain) Jan Oliveras	(Spain) Celta Vigo	Free	After return from loan	
1 September 2025	MF	(The Gambia) Ebrima Darboe	(Italy) Bari	Undisclosed	After return from loan	

==== Loans ended ====
Date	Pos.	Player	To	Fee	Notes	Ref.
30 June 2025	MF	(Belgium) Alexis Saelemaekers	(Italy) Milan	—N/a		
30 June 2025	MF	(France) Lucas Gourna-Douath	(Austria) Red Bull Salzburg	—N/a	Option to buy not exercised	
30 June 2025	DF	(Denmark) Victor Nelsson	(Turkey) Galatasaray	—N/a	Option to buy not exercised	

==== Loans out ====
Date	Pos.	Player	To	Fee	Notes	Ref.
3 July 2025	FW	(England) Tammy Abraham	(Turkey) Beşiktaş	€2,000,000	After return from loan, with €13,000,000 obligation to buy	
8 July 2025	MF	(Italy) Riccardo Pagano	(Italy) Bari	Free	After return from loan, with option to buy	
10 July 2025	FW	(Uzbekistan) Eldor Shomurodov	(Turkey) İstanbul Başakşehir	€3,000,000	With option to buy	
1 August 2025	MF	(Italy) Mattia Mannini	(Italy) Juve Stabia	Free	From Primavera squad	
3 August 2025	DF	(Saudi Arabia) Saud Abdulhamid	(France) Lens	€500,000	With option to buy	
18 August 2025	DF	(Italy) Filippo Reale	(Italy) Juve Stabia	Free	From Primavera squad	
18 August 2025	DF	(Albania) Marash Kumbulla	(Spain) Mallorca	Free	After return from loan, with option to buy	
21 August 2025	FW	(Italy) Luigi Cherubini	(Italy) Sampdoria	Free	After return from loan	
31 August 2025	DF	(Morocco) Anass Salah-Eddine	(Netherlands) PSV Eindhoven	Free	With option to buy	

Total income: ▲€48.25M
Balance: ▼€9.75M

=== Winter window ===
==== In ====
Date	Pos.	Player	From	Fee	Notes	Ref.
14 January 2026	FW	(France) Robinio Vaz	(France) Marseille	€25,000,000		

==== Loans in ====
Date	Pos.	Player	From	Fee	Notes	Ref.
16 January 2026	FW	(Netherlands) Donyell Malen	(England) Aston Villa	€2,000,000	With option to buy	
24 January 2026	FW	(Italy) Lorenzo Venturino	(Italy) Genoa	Free	With option to buy	
2 February 2026	FW	(Spain) Bryan Zaragoza	(Germany) Bayern Munich	€2,000,000	With option to buy	

==== Loan returns ====
Date	Pos.	Player	From	Fee	Notes	Ref.

Total spending: ▼€29M

==== Out ====
Date	Pos.	Player	To	Fee	Notes	Ref.
17 January 2026	MF	(Italy) Edoardo Bove	Free agent		Contract terminated	
26 January 2026	FW	(England) Tammy Abraham	(Turkey) Beşiktaş	€13,000,000	From loan to definitive purchase	

==== Loans ended ====
Date	Pos.	Player	To	Fee	Notes	Ref.
21 January 2026	FW	(Jamaica) Leon Bailey	(England) Aston Villa	—N/a	Loan terminated	

==== Loans out ====
Date	Pos.	Player	To	Fee	Notes	Ref.
16 January 2026	MF	(Switzerland) Alessandro Romano	(Italy) Spezia	Free	From Primavera squad	
23 January 2026	FW	(Italy) Tommaso Baldanzi	(Italy) Genoa	Free	With option to buy	
2 February 2026	DF	(Spain) Buba Sangaré	(Spain) Elche	Free	With option to buy	
6 February 2026	GK	(Colombia) Devis Vásquez	(Turkey) Beşiktaş	Free	With option to buy	

Total income: ▲€13M
Balance: ▼€16M

== Friendlies ==
=== Pre-season ===
19 July 2025 Friendly	Roma (Italy)	14–0	(Italy) Trastevere
	Baldanzi 4', 49'; Dybala 30', 32'; Rensch 34', 39'; Cristante 52'; Angeliño 53'; Hermoso 56'; Romano 59'; Kumbulla 69'; Mannini 82', 87'; Cherubini 88'	Report

24 July 2025 Friendly	Roma (Italy)	9–0	(Italy) UniPomezia
	Ferguson 8', 18', 24', 62'; Dybala 33'; El Aynaoui 65'; Çelik 73'; Baldanzi 79'; Arena 88'	Report

26 July 2025 Friendly	1. FC Kaiserslautern (Germany)	0–1	(Italy) Roma	Kaiserslautern, Germany
18:00 CEST (UTC+2)	Ritter (yellow card) 53'; Prtajin (yellow card) 62'; Aremu (yellow card) 77'	Report	Ferguson 16', (yellow card) 53'; El Aynaoui (yellow card) 66'	Stadium: Fritz-Walter-Stadion; Attendance: 35,650

31 July 2025 Friendly	Roma (Italy)	3–0	(France) Cannes	Rome
18:00 CEST (UTC+2)	El Shaarawy 3'; Dovbyk 43'; Ferguson 88'	Report	Pineau (yellow card) 53'	Stadium: Stadio Tre Fontane; Attendance: 2,772; Referee: Fabrizio Perri (Italy)

2 August 2025 Trophée 1906	Lens (France)	0–2	(Italy) Roma	Lens, France
18:00 CEST (UTC+2)	Machado (yellow card) 45+2'	Report	Çelik (yellow card) 12'; Mancini 14'; Dovbyk (yellow card) 47'; Soulé 55'; Angeliño (yellow card) 67'; Cherubini (yellow card) 77'	Stadium: Stade Bollaert-Delelis; Attendance: 32,000; Referee: Marc Bollengier (France)

6 August 2025 Friendly	Aston Villa (England)	4–0	(Italy) Roma	Walsall, England
19:30 BST (UTC+1)	Buendía 15'; Ramsey 17'; Watkins 40'; Malen 85'	Report		Stadium: Bescot Stadium; Attendance: 11,000; Referee: Craig Pawson (England)

9 August 2025 Friendly	Everton (England)	0–1	(Italy) Roma	Liverpool, England
15:00 BST (UTC+1)		Report	Soulé 70'	Stadium: Hill Dickinson Stadium; Attendance: 50,837; Referee: Peter Bankes (England)

16 August 2025 Friendly	Roma (Italy)	2–2	(Saudi Arabia) Neom	Frosinone
17:00 CEST (UTC+2)	Cristante 25'; Soulé 32'	Report	Benrahma 26'; Abdi 38', (yellow card) 79'; Al-Asmari (yellow card) 90+1'	Stadium: Stadio Benito Stirpe; Attendance: 6,000

== Competitions ==
=== Overall record ===
Competition	First match	Last match	Starting round	Final position	Record							
Competition	First match	Last match	Starting round	Final position	Pld	W	D	L	GF	GA	GD	Win %
Serie A	23 August 2025	24 May 2026	Matchday 1	3rd	38	23	4	11	59	31	+28	60.53
Coppa Italia	13 January 2026		Round of 16	Round of 16	1	0	0	1	2	3	−1	0.00
UEFA Europa League	24 September 2025	19 March 2026	League phase	Round of 16	10	5	2	3	17	11	+6	50.00
Total					49	28	6	15	78	45	+33	57.14

Source: Soccerway

=== Serie A ===
==== League table ====
Pos	Team	Pld	W	D	L	GF	GA	GD	Pts	Qualification or relegation
1	Inter Milan (C)	38	27	6	5	89	35	+54	87	Qualification for the UEFA Champions League league phase
2	Napoli	38	23	7	8	58	36	+22	76	Qualification for the UEFA Champions League league phase
3	Roma	38	23	4	11	59	31	+28	73	Qualification for the UEFA Champions League league phase
4	Como	38	20	11	7	65	29	+36	71	Qualification for the UEFA Champions League league phase
5	AC Milan	38	20	10	8	53	35	+18	70	Qualification for the UEFA Europa League league phase (Note: Since the 2025–26 Coppa Italia winners, Inter Milan, qualified for the Champions League via league position, the Europa League spot awarded to the cup winners was passed to the sixth-placed team, and the Conference League spot was moved down one league position.)

Source: Serie A
Rules for classification: 1) Points; 2) Tiebreaker for Champions team and third relegated team; 3) Head-to-head points; 4) Head-to-head goal difference; 5) Goal difference; 6) Goals scored; 7) Draw.
(Note: Head-to-head record is used only after all the matches between the teams in question have been played)
(C) Champions

==== Results summary ====
Overall								Home						Away					
Pld	W	D	L	GF	GA	GD	Pts	W	D	L	GF	GA	GD	W	D	L	GF	GA	GD
38	23	4	11	59	31	+28	73	13	3	3	33	10	+23	10	1	8	26	21	+5

Source: Serie A

==== Results by round ====
Round	1	2	3	4	5	6	7	8	9	10	11	12	13	14	15	16	17	18	19	20	21	22	23	24	25	26	27	28	29	30	31	32	33	34	35	36	37	38
Ground	H	A	H	A	H	A	H	A	H	A	H	A	H	A	H	A	H	A	A	H	A	H	A	H	A	H	H	A	A	H	A	H	H	A	H	A	H	A
Result	W	W	L	W	W	W	L	W	W	L	W	W	L	L	W	L	W	L	W	W	W	D	L	W	D	W	D	L	L	W	L	W	D	W	W	W	W	W
Position	6	4	6	4	3	2	4	2	2	4	2	1	4	4	4	4	4	5	5	5	4	3	5	5	4	4	4	5	6	6	6	6	6	6	5	5	4	3

Source: Serie A
A = Away; H = Home; W = Win; D = Draw; L = Loss

==== Matches ====
The match schedule was released on 6 June 2025.

23 August 2025 1	Roma	1–0	Bologna	Rome
20:45 CEST (UTC+2)	Wesley 53'; Mancini (yellow card) 67'	Report	Freuler (yellow card) 19'	Stadium: Stadio Olimpico; Attendance: 63,681; Referee: Luca Zufferli

30 August 2025 2	Pisa	0–1	Roma	Pisa
20:45 CEST (UTC+2)	Marin (yellow card) 32'; Meister (yellow card) 90+6'	Report	Ferguson (yellow card) 33'; Soulé 55'	Stadium: Stadio Romeo Anconetani; Attendance: 11,554; Referee: Giuseppe Collu

14 September 2025 3	Roma	0–1	Torino	Rome
12:30 CEST (UTC+2)	Wesley (yellow card) 52'; Angeliño (yellow card) 77'	Report	Asllani (yellow card) 32'; Ismajli (yellow card) 35'; Simeone 59'; Aboukhlal (yellow card) 81'	Stadium: Stadio Olimpico; Attendance: 62,635; Referee: Giovanni Ayroldi

21 September 2025 4	Lazio	0–1	Roma	Rome
12:30 CEST (UTC+2)	Belahyane (red card) 85'; Gila (yellow card) 88'; Guendouzi (red card) 90+7'	Report	Pellegrini 38'; Ndicka (yellow card) 83'	Stadium: Stadio Olimpico; Attendance: 61,000; Referee: Simone Sozza

28 September 2025 5	Roma	2–0	Hellas Verona	Rome
15:00 CEST (UTC+2)	Dovbyk 7'; Soulé 79'	Report	Akpa Akpro (yellow card) 12'; Nuñez (yellow card) 45'; Gagliardini (yellow card) 53'; Belghali (yellow card) 90+1'	Stadium: Stadio Olimpico; Attendance: 62,334; Referee: Ermanno Feliciani

5 October 2025 6	Fiorentina	1–2	Roma	Florence
15:00 CEST (UTC+2)	Kean 14'; Guðmundsson (yellow card) 43'; Marí (yellow card) 70'	Report	Cristante (yellow card) 3', (goal) 30'; Soulé 22'; Tsimikas (yellow card) 65'; Wesley (yellow card) 68'	Stadium: Stadio Artemio Franchi; Attendance: 20,548; Referee: Andrea Colombo

18 October 2025 7	Roma	0–1	Internazionale	Rome
20:45 CEST (UTC+2)	Ndicka (yellow card) 40'; Ziółkowski (yellow card) 70'; Hermoso (yellow card) 73'; Baldanzi (yellow card) 90+4'	Report	L. Martínez (yellow card) 4'; Bonny 6'; Mkhitaryan (yellow card) 74'; Sučić (yellow card) 79'	Stadium: Stadio Olimpico; Attendance: 65,849; Referee: Davide Massa

26 October 2025 8	Sassuolo	0–1	Roma	Reggio Emilia
15:00 CET (UTC+1)	Thorstvedt (yellow card) 34'; Doig (yellow card) 37'; Volpato (yellow card) 77'	Report	Dybala 16'; Mancini (yellow card) 24'; Hermoso (yellow card) 47'	Stadium: Mapei Stadium – Città del Tricolore; Attendance: 19,674; Referee: Gianluca Manganiello

29 October 2025 9	Roma	2–1	Parma	Rome
18:30 CET (UTC+1)	Hermoso 63'; Dovbyk 81'	Report	Pellegrino (yellow card) 38'; Troilo (yellow card) 43'; Circati 86'; Ordóñez (yellow card) 90+2'	Stadium: Stadio Olimpico; Attendance: 61,043; Referee: Valerio Crezzini

2 November 2025 10	Milan	1–0	Roma	Milan
20:45 CET (UTC+1)	Pavlović 39'; Fofana (yellow card) 78'	Report	El Aynaoui (yellow card) 34'; Wesley (yellow card) 74'; Çelik (yellow card) 75'; Dybala (penalty missed) 53'; Hermoso (yellow card) 83'; Mancini (yellow card) 90+5'	Stadium: San Siro; Attendance: 75,048; Referee: Marco Guida

9 November 2025 11	Roma	2–0	Udinese	Rome
18:00 CET (UTC+1)	Cristante (yellow card) 28'; Pellegrini 42' (pen.), (yellow card) 45+4'; Çelik 61'	Report	Karlström (yellow card) 62'	Stadium: Stadio Olimpico; Attendance: 61,684; Referee: Giuseppe Collu

23 November 2025 12	Cremonese	1–3	Roma	Cremona
15:00 CET (UTC+1)	Payero (yellow card) 32'; Bondo (yellow card) 82'; Folino 90+3'	Report	Soulé 17'; Ziółkowski (yellow card) 45'; Ferguson 64'; Wesley 69'; El Aynaoui (yellow card) 84'	Stadium: Stadio Giovanni Zini; Attendance: 14,666; Referee: Giovanni Ayroldi

30 November 2025 13	Roma	0–1	Napoli	Rome
20:45 CET (UTC+1)	Cristante (yellow card) 54'; Baldanzi (yellow card) 73'; Ndicka (yellow card) 86'; El Shaarawy (yellow card) 90+3'	Report	Neres 36'; Lobotka (yellow card) 63'; Beukema (yellow card) 64'; Olivera (yellow card) 90+6'	Stadium: Stadio Olimpico; Attendance: 63,937; Referee: Davide Massa

7 December 2025 14	Cagliari	1–0	Roma	Cagliari
15:00 CET (UTC+1)	Folorunsho (yellow card) 78'; Gaetano 82', (yellow card) 83'	Report	Çelik (red card) 52'; Hermoso (yellow card) 78'	Stadium: Unipol Domus; Attendance: 16,255; Referee: Luca Zufferli

15 December 2025 15	Roma	1–0	Como	Rome
20:45 CET (UTC+1)	Mancini (yellow card) 58'; Wesley 61', (yellow card) 89'; El Shaarawy (yellow card) 88'	Report	Addai (yellow card) 55'; Paz (yellow card) 59'; Ramón (yellow card) 90+6'	Stadium: Stadio Olimpico; Attendance: 60,207; Referee: Ermanno Feliciani

20 December 2025 16	Juventus	2–1	Roma	Turin
20:45 CET (UTC+1)	Conceição (yellow card) 24', (goal) 44'; Openda 70'; McKennie (yellow card) 87'	Report	Soulé (yellow card) 21'; Koné (yellow card) 65'; Baldanzi 75'; Cristante (yellow card) 84'	Stadium: Juventus Stadium; Attendance: 41,602; Referee: Simone Sozza

29 December 2025 17	Roma	3–1	Genoa	Rome
20:45 CET (UTC+1)	Soulé 14'; Koné 19'; Ferguson 31'	Report	Frendrup (yellow card) 50'; Ekhator 87'	Stadium: Stadio Olimpico; Attendance: 67,785; Referee: Marco Di Bello

3 January 2026 18	Atalanta	1–0	Roma	Bergamo
20:45 CET (UTC+1)	Scalvini 12'; De Roon (yellow card) 19'	Report	Mancini (yellow card) 43'; Hermoso (yellow card) 45+3'	Stadium: Gewiss Stadium; Attendance: 23,088; Referee: Michael Fabbri

6 January 2026 19	Lecce	0–2	Roma	Lecce
18:00 CET (UTC+1)	Banda (yellow card) 5'; Maleh (yellow card) 28'; Gaspar (yellow card) 86'	Report	Ferguson 14'; Dovbyk 71'; Cristante (yellow card) 86'	Stadium: Stadio Via del mare Attendance: 24,715; Referee: Juan Luca Sacchi

10 January 2026 20	Roma	2–0	Sassuolo	Rome
18:00 CET (UTC+1)	Koné (yellow card) 22', (goal) 76'; Hermoso (yellow card) 23'; Soulé 79'	Report	Muric (yellow card) 59'; Matić (yellow card) 85'	Stadium: Stadio Olimpico; Attendance: 60,713; Referee: Matteo Marcenaro

18 January 2026 21	Torino	0–2	Roma	Turin
18:00 CET (UTC+1)	Ismajli (yellow card) 9'; Vlašić (yellow card) 90+1'	Report	Malen 26'; Mancini (yellow card) 55'; Dybala 72'	Stadium: Stadio Olimpico Grande Torino; Attendance: 22,138; Referee: Daniele Chiffi

25 January 2026 22	Roma	1–1	Milan	Rome
20:45 CET (UTC+1)	Pellegrini 74' (pen.)	Report	Rabiot (yellow card) 51'; Athekame (yellow card) 55'; De Winter 62'; Modrić (yellow card) 70'; Maignan (yellow card) 74'	Stadium: Stadio Olimpico; Attendance: 63,582; Referee: Andrea Colombo

2 February 2026 23	Udinese	1–0	Roma	Udine
20:45 CET (UTC+1)	Davis (yellow card) 17'; Kristensen (yellow card) 35'; Ekkelenkamp 49'; Zemura (yellow card) 62'; Miller (yellow card) 69'; Gueye (yellow card) 70'	Report	Ndicka (yellow card) 7'; Mancini (yellow card) 48'; El Aynaoui (yellow card) 59'; Pellegrini (yellow card) 67'	Stadium: Stadio Friuli; Attendance: 23,598; Referee: Juan Luca Sacchi

9 February 2026 24	Roma	2–0	Cagliari	Rome
20:45 CET (UTC+1)	Malen 25', 65'; Mancini (yellow card) 58'; Zaragoza (yellow card) 82'	Report	Dossena (yellow card) 5'; Palestra (yellow card) 40'; Gaetano (yellow card) 61'; Idrissi (yellow card) 89'	Stadium: Stadio Olimpico; Attendance: 60,334; Referee: Matteo Marcenaro

15 February 2026 25	Napoli	2–2	Roma	Naples
20:45 CET (UTC+1)	Spinazzola 40'; Rrahmani (yellow card) 69'; Alisson Santos 82'	Report	Malen 7', 71' (pen.); Mancini (yellow card) 26'	Stadium: Stadio Diego Armando Maradona; Attendance: 52,000; Referee: Andrea Colombo

22 February 2026 26	Roma	3–0	Cremonese	Rome
20:45 CET (UTC+1)	Cristante 59'; El Aynaoui (yellow card) 66'; Ndicka 77'; Pisilli 86'	Report	Thorsby (yellow card) 24'	Stadium: Stadio Olimpico; Attendance: 59,025; Referee: Marco Di Bello

1 March 2026 27	Roma	3–3	Juventus	Rome
20:45 CET (UTC+1)	Wesley (yellow card) 27', (goal) 39'; Ndicka 54'; Malen 65'	Report	Conceição 47'; Boga 78'; Gatti 90+3'	Stadium: Stadio Olimpico; Attendance: 65,870; Referee: Simone Sozza

8 March 2026 28	Genoa	2–1	Roma	Genoa
18:00 CET (UTC+1)	Masini (yellow card) 16'; Messias 52' (pen.); Vitinha 80'	Report	Ndicka (yellow card) 12', (goal) 55'; Malen (yellow card) 40'; Cristante (yellow card) 89'	Stadium: Stadio Luigi Ferraris; Attendance: 30,758; Referee: Andrea Colombo

15 March 2026 29	Como	2–1	Roma	Como
18:00 CET (UTC+1)	Douvikas 59'; Caqueret (yellow card) 63'; Diego Carlos (yellow card) 73', (goal) 79'	Report	Malen 7' (pen.); Wesley (yellow card) 48' (yellow-red card) 64'; Ghilardi (yellow card) 77'	Stadium: Stadio Giuseppe Sinigaglia; Attendance: 11,977; Referee: Davide Massa

22 March 2026 30	Roma	1–0	Lecce	Rome
18:00 CET (UTC+1)	Vaz 57'; Angeliño (yellow card) 77'; Pisilli (yellow card) 89'	Report	Pierotti (yellow card) 81'; Veiga (yellow card) 90'	Stadium: Stadio Olimpico; Attendance: 62,432; Referee: Juan Luca Sacchi

5 April 2026 31	Internazionale	5–2	Roma	Milan
20:45 CEST (UTC+2)	L. Martínez 2', 52'; Çalhanoğlu 45+2'; Thuram 55'; Barella 63'	Report	Mancini 40'; Pisilli (yellow card) 60'; Pellegrini 70'	Stadium: San Siro; Attendance: 75,267; Referee: Simone Sozza

10 April 2026 32	Roma	3–0	Pisa	Rome
20:45 CEST (UTC+2)	Malen 3', 43', 52'; Çelik (yellow card) 50'	Report	Touré (yellow card) 21'	Stadium: Stadio Olimpico; Attendance: 60,075; Referee: Ermanno Feliciani

18 April 2026 33	Roma	1–1	Atalanta	Rome
20:45 CEST (UTC+2)	Hermoso 45'; Pisilli (yellow card) 75'	Report	Krstović 12'; Éderson (yellow card) 65'; Djimsiti (yellow card) 90+1'	Stadium: Stadio Olimpico; Attendance: 61,474; Referee: Matteo Marcenaro

25 April 2026 34	Bologna	0–2	Roma	Bologna
18:00 CEST (UTC+2)		Report	Malen 7'; El Aynaoui 45+1', (yellow card) 69'; Hermoso (yellow card) 46'; Rensch (yellow card) 66'	Stadium: Stadio Renato Dall'Ara; Attendance: 28,961; Referee: Marco Di Bello

4 May 2026 35	Roma	4–0	Fiorentina	Rome
20:45 CEST (UTC+2)	Mancini 13'; Wesley 17'; Hermoso 34', (yellow card) 48'; Pisilli 58'; El Shaarawy (yellow card) 90+2'	Report	Pongračić (yellow card) 25'; Parisi (yellow card) 66'	Stadium: Stadio Olimpico; Attendance: 61,307; Referee: Luca Zufferli

10 May 2026 36	Parma	2–3	Roma	Parma
18:00 CEST (UTC+2)	Strefezza 47', (yellow card) 48'; Troilo (yellow card) 65'; Britschgi (yellow card) 76' (yellow-red card) 90+9'; Keita 87'	Report	Malen 22', 90+11' (pen.); Rensch 90+4'	Stadium: Stadio Ennio Tardini; Attendance: 18,685; Referee: Daniele Chiffi

17 May 2026 37	Roma	2–0	Lazio	Rome
12:00 CEST (UTC+2)	Mancini 40', 66'; Hermoso (yellow card) 43'; Wesley (red card) 71'; El Shaarawy (yellow card) 85'	Report	Taylor (yellow card) 22'; Cancellieri (yellow card) 42'; Tavares (yellow card) 64'; Rovella (red card) 71'	Stadium: Stadio Olimpico; Attendance: 50,152; Referee: Fabio Maresca

24 May 2026 38	Hellas Verona	0–2	Roma	Verona
20:45 CEST (UTC+2)	Valentini (yellow card) 35' (yellow-red card) 50'; Lovrić (yellow card) 45+1'	Report	Malen 56'; Ziółkowski (yellow card) 71'; El Shaarawy 90+3'	Stadium: Stadio Marcantonio Bentegodi; Attendance: 23,277; Referee: Simone Sozza

=== Coppa Italia ===
13 January 2026 Round of 16	Roma	2–3	Torino	Rome
21:00 CET (UTC+1)	Rensch (yellow card) 14'; Hermoso 46'; Arena 81'; Ghilardi (yellow card) 90+2'	Report	Aboukhlal (yellow card) 23'; Adams 35', 52'; Lazaro (yellow card) 47'; İlkhan 90'	Stadium: Stadio Olimpico; Attendance: 60,538; Referee: Kevin Bonacina

=== UEFA Europa League ===
==== League phase ====
The draw for the league phase was held on 29 August 2025.

Pos	Team	Pld	W	D	L	GF	GA	GD	Pts	Qualification
6	(Portuguese Football Federation) Braga	8	5	2	1	11	5	+6	17	Advance to round of 16 (seeded)
7	(German Football Association) SC Freiburg	8	5	2	1	10	4	+6	17	Advance to round of 16 (seeded)
8	(Italian Football Federation) Roma	8	5	1	2	13	6	+7	16	Advance to round of 16 (seeded)
9	(Royal Belgian Football Association) Genk	8	5	1	2	11	7	+4	16	Advance to knockout phase play-offs (seeded)
10	(Italian Football Federation) Bologna	8	4	3	1	14	7	+7	15	Advance to knockout phase play-offs (seeded)

Source: UEFA
Rules for classification: League phase tiebreakers

Round	1	2	3	4	5	6	7	8
Ground	A	H	H	A	H	A	H	A
Result	W	L	L	W	W	W	W	D
Position	4	15	23	18	15	10	6	8

Source: UEFA
A = Away; H = Home; W = Win; D = Draw; L = Loss

24 September 2025 1	Nice (France)	1–2	(Italy) Roma	Nice, France
21:00 CEST (UTC+2)	Moffi 77' (pen.)	Report	Koné (yellow card) 27'; El Aynaoui (yellow card) 41'; Ndicka (yellow card) 41', (goal) 52'; Mancini 55'; Tsimikas (yellow card) 79'; Hermoso (yellow card) 88'	Stadium: Allianz Riviera; Attendance: 23,089; Referee: Guillermo Cuadra Fernández (Spain)

2 October 2025 2	Roma (Italy)	0–1	(France) Lille	Rome, Italy
18:45 CEST (UTC+2)	Soulé (penalty missed) 85'	Report	Haraldsson 6'; Verdonk (yellow card) 9'; Bouaddi (yellow card) 61'; Mandi (yellow card) 81'; Özer (yellow card) 90+3'	Stadium: Stadio Olimpico; Attendance: 61,561; Referee: Erik Lambrechts (Belgium)

23 October 2025 3	Roma (Italy)	1–2	(Czech Republic) Viktoria Plzeň	Rome, Italy
21:00 CEST (UTC+2)	Dybala 54' (pen.); Çelik (yellow card) 56'; Mancini (yellow card) 80'	Report	Adu 20'; Souaré 22', (yellow card) 60'; Durosinmi (yellow card) 30'; Spáčil (yellow card) 67'; Červ (yellow card) 75'; Višinský (yellow card) 90+5'	Stadium: Stadio Olimpico; Attendance: 52,263; Referee: Halil Umut Meler (Turkey)

6 November 2025 4	Rangers (Scotland)	0–2	(Italy) Roma	Glasgow, Scotland
20:00 GMT (UTC+0)		Report	Soulé 13'; Pellegrini 36'	Stadium: Ibrox Stadium; Attendance: 41,847; Referee: Morten Krogh (Denmark)

27 November 2025 5	Roma (Italy)	2–1	(Denmark) Midtjylland	Rome, Italy
18:45 CET (UTC+1)	El Aynaoui 7'; Cristante (yellow card) 52'; El Shaarawy 83'; Mancini (yellow card) 89'	Report	Osorio (yellow card) 77'; Erlić (yellow card) 80'; Bech (yellow card) 85'; Paulinho 86'	Stadium: Stadio Olimpico; Attendance: 61,653; Referee: Nikola Dabanović (Montenegro)

11 December 2025 6	Celtic (Scotland)	0–3	(Italy) Roma	Glasgow, Scotland
20:00 GMT (UTC+0)	Engels (penalty missed) 45+5'	Report	Scales 6' (o.g.); Ferguson 36', 45+1'; Hermoso (yellow card) 45+4'; El Shaarawy (yellow card) 45+4'; Soulé (yellow card) 45+4'; Ndicka (yellow card) 78'; Ziółkowski (yellow card) 88'	Stadium: Celtic Park; Attendance: 56,188; Referee: István Kovács (Romania)

22 January 2026 7	Roma (Italy)	2–0	(Germany) VfB Stuttgart	Rome, Italy
21:00 CET (UTC+1)	Pisilli 40', 90+3'; Çelik (yellow card) 87'	Report	Mittelstädt (yellow card) 18'; Chabot (yellow card) 85'	Stadium: Stadio Olimpico; Attendance: 65,183; Referee: John Brooks (England)

29 January 2026 8	Panathinaikos (Greece)	1–1	(Italy) Roma	Athens, Greece
22:00 EET (UTC+2)	Siopis (yellow card) 10'; Taborda 58'	Report	Mancini (red card) 15'; Ghilardi (yellow card) 41'; Pisilli (yellow card) 70'; Ziółkowski 80'	Stadium: Olympic Stadium; Attendance: 27,432; Referee: Juan Martínez Munuera (Spain)

==== Knockout phase ====
===== Round of 16 =====
The draw for the round of 16 was held on 27 February 2026.

12 March 2026 First leg	Bologna (Italy)	1–1	(Italy) Roma	Bologna, Italy
18:45 CET (UTC+1)	Miranda (yellow card) 13'; João Mário (yellow card) 47'; Bernardeschi 50'; Casale (yellow card) 57'	Report	Wesley (yellow card) 15'; Cristante (yellow card) 67'; Pellegrini 71'	Stadium: Stadio Renato Dall'Ara; Attendance: 26,277; Referee: Sven Jablonski (Germany)

19 March 2026 Second leg	Roma (Italy)	3–4 (a.e.t.) (4–5 agg.)	(Italy) Bologna	Rome, Italy
21:00 CET (UTC+1)	Ndicka 32'; Çelik (yellow card) 55'; Malen 69' (pen.); Pellegrini 80'; Mancini (yellow card) 120+3'	Report	Rowe 22'; Vitík (yellow card) 26'; Bernardeschi 45+2' (pen.); Castro 58'; Zortea (yellow card) 71'; Lucumí (yellow card) 76'; Freuler (yellow card) 108'; Cambiaghi 111'; Ferguson (yellow card) 116'	Stadium: Stadio Olimpico; Attendance: 63,908; Referee: István Kovács (Romania)

== Statistics ==
=== Squad statistics ===
No.	Pos	Nat	Player	Total		Serie A		Coppa Italia		Europa League	
No.	Pos	Nat	Player	Apps	Goals	Apps	Goals	Apps	Goals	Apps	Goals
Goalkeepers
91	GK	(Poland) POL	Radosław Żelezny	0	0	0	0	0	0	0	0
95	GK	(Italy) ITA	Pierluigi Gollini	1	0	0	0	0	0	1	0
99	GK	(Serbia) SRB	Mile Svilar	48	0	38	0	1	0	9	0
Defenders
2	DF	(Netherlands) NED	Devyne Rensch	32	1	12+12	1	1	0	4+3	0
3	DF	(Spain) ESP	Angeliño	9	0	5+2	0	0	0	0+2	0
5	DF	(Ivory Coast) CIV	Evan Ndicka	42	5	31	3	0+1	0	7+3	2
12	DF	(Greece) GRE	Kostas Tsimikas	25	0	6+12	0	0	0	5+2	0
19	DF	(Turkey) TUR	Zeki Çelik	45	1	32+2	1	1	0	10	0
22	DF	(Spain) ESP	Mario Hermoso	35	4	25+2	3	0+1	1	5+2	0
23	DF	(Italy) ITA	Gianluca Mancini	45	5	36	4	0	0	7+2	1
24	DF	(Poland) POL	Jan Ziółkowski	23	1	5+13	0	1	0	3+1	1
43	DF	(Brazil) BRA	Wesley	39	5	28+2	5	1	0	5+3	0
87	DF	(Italy) ITA	Daniele Ghilardi	28	0	9+14	0	1	0	4	0
Midfielders
4	MF	(Italy) ITA	Bryan Cristante	46	2	36+1	2	1	0	5+3	0
7	MF	(Italy) ITA	Lorenzo Pellegrini	33	6	20+4	3	0	0	5+4	3
8	MF	(Morocco) MAR	Neil El Aynaoui	34	2	8+17	1	0	0	8+1	1
17	MF	(France) FRA	Manu Koné	37	2	28+1	2	0+1	0	5+2	0
61	MF	(Italy) ITA	Niccolò Pisilli	34	4	13+12	2	1	0	5+3	2
Forwards
9	FW	(Ukraine) UKR	Artem Dovbyk	18	3	3+11	3	0	0	3+1	0
11	FW	(Republic of Ireland) IRL	Evan Ferguson	22	5	10+6	3	0	0	3+3	2
14	FW	(Netherlands) NED	Donyell Malen	20	15	18	14	0	0	2	1
18	FW	(Argentina) ARG	Matías Soulé	42	7	28+5	6	1	0	8	1
20	FW	(Italy) ITA	Lorenzo Venturino	10	0	1+9	0	0	0	0	0
21	FW	(Argentina) ARG	Paulo Dybala	27	3	15+7	2	0+1	0	2+2	1
68	FW	(Italy) ITA	Antonio Arena	3	1	0+2	0	0+1	1	0	0
75	FW	(Italy) ITA	Mattia Della Rocca	1	0	0	0	0	0	0+1	0
78	FW	(France) FRA	Robinio Vaz	14	1	0+12	1	0	0	0+2	0
92	FW	(Italy) ITA	Stephan El Shaarawy	28	2	5+15	1	1	0	3+4	1
97	FW	(Spain) ESP	Bryan Zaragoza	6	0	2+2	0	0	0	1+1	0
Players transferred/loaned out during the season
31	FW	(Jamaica) JAM	Leon Bailey	11	0	1+6	0	1	0	0+3	0
32	GK	(Colombia) COL	Devis Vásquez	0	0	0	0	0	0	0	0
35	FW	(Italy) ITA	Tommaso Baldanzi	10	1	3+7	1	0	0	0	0
60	MF	(Switzerland) SUI	Alessandro Romano	2	0	0+2	0	0	0	0	0
66	DF	(Spain) ESP	Buba Sangaré	0	0	0	0	0	0	0	0

Source: Competitions

=== Goalscorers ===
Rank	No.	Pos.	Nat.	Player	Serie A	Coppa Italia	Europa League	Total
1	14	FW	(Netherlands)	Donyell Malen	14	0	1	15
2	7	MF	(Italy)	Lorenzo Pellegrini	4	0	3	7
2	18	FW	(Argentina)	Matías Soulé	6	0	1	7
4	5	DF	(Ivory Coast)	Evan Ndicka	3	0	2	5
4	11	FW	(Republic of Ireland)	Evan Ferguson	3	0	2	5
4	23	DF	(Italy)	Gianluca Mancini	4	0	1	5
4	43	DF	(Brazil)	Wesley	5	0	0	5
8	22	DF	(Spain)	Mario Hermoso	3	1	0	4
8	61	MF	(Italy)	Niccolò Pisilli	2	0	2	4
10	9	FW	(Ukraine)	Artem Dovbyk	3	0	0	3
10	21	FW	(Argentina)	Paulo Dybala	2	0	1	3
12	4	MF	(Italy)	Bryan Cristante	2	0	0	2
12	8	MF	(Morocco)	Neil El Aynaoui	1	0	1	2
12	17	MF	(France)	Manu Koné	2	0	0	2
12	92	FW	(Italy)	Stephan El Shaarawy	1	0	1	2
16	2	DF	(Netherlands)	Devyne Rensch	1	0	0	1
16	19	DF	(Turkey)	Zeki Çelik	1	0	0	1
16	24	DF	(Poland)	Jan Ziółkowski	0	0	1	1
16	35	FW	(Italy)	Tommaso Baldanzi	1	0	0	1
16	68	FW	(Italy)	Antonio Arena	0	1	0	1
16	78	FW	(France)	Robinio Vaz	1	0	0	1
Own goals					0	0	1	1
Totals					56	2	17	75
