= Tino Anjorin =

English footballer (born 2001)

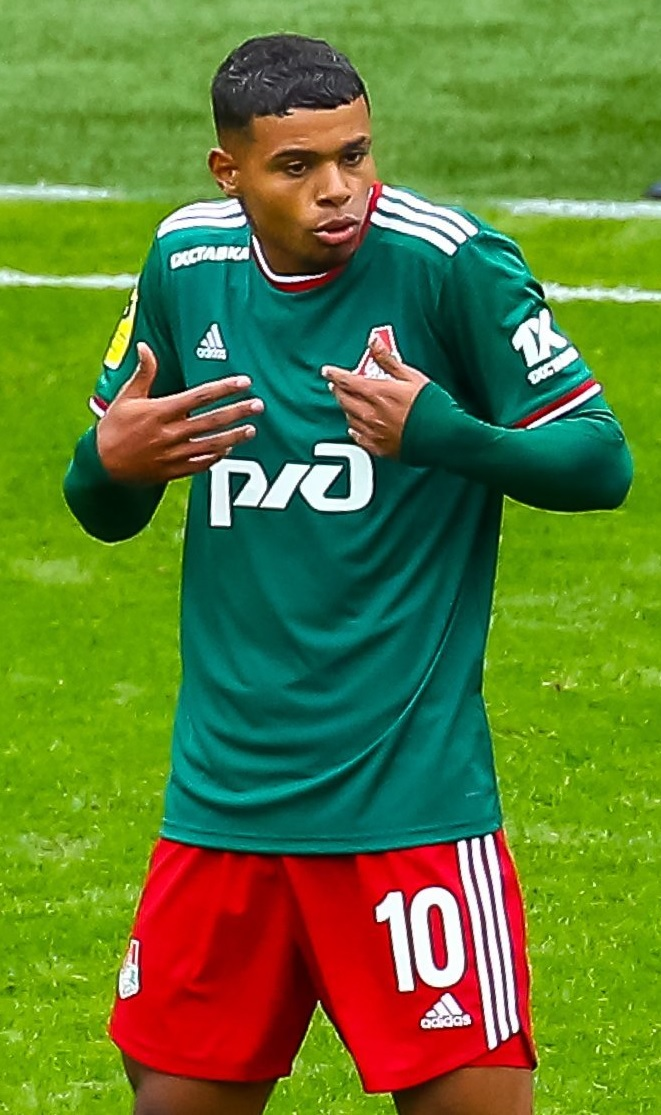
- Anjorin with Lokomotiv Moscow in 2021

Personal information
- Full name: Faustino Adebola Rasheed Anjorin
- Date of birth: 23 November 2001 (age 24)
- Place of birth: Poole, England
- Height: 1.86 m (6 ft 1 in)
- Positions: Attacking midfielder; left winger

Team information
- Current team: Göztepe (on loan from Torino)
- Number: 18

Youth career
- 2008–2019: Chelsea

Senior career*
Years	Team	Apps	(Gls)
2019–2024	Chelsea	1	(0)
2021–2022	→ Lokomotiv Moscow (loan)	7	(0)
2022–2023	→ Huddersfield Town (loan)	15	(3)
2023–2024	→ Portsmouth (loan)	12	(1)
2024–2026	Empoli	22	(2)
2025–2026	→ Torino (loan)	15	(0)
2026–	Torino	0	(0)
2026–	→ Göztepe (loan)	1	(0)

International career
2018	England U17	6	(0)
2018	England U18	7	(4)
2019	England U19	3	(1)
2021	England U20	2	(1)
- * Club domestic league appearances and goals as of 14:21, 9 September 2026 (UTC)

Faustino Adebola Rasheed "Tino" Anjorin (born 23 November 2001) is an English professional footballer who plays as an attacking midfielder or left winger for Süper Lig club Göztepe, on loan from Serie A club Torino.

== Club career ==
=== Early career ===
Anjorin joined Chelsea's development centre programme at under-7 level, officially signing with the club at under-9 level. On 30 April 2018, Anjorin scored in the second leg of Chelsea's 2017–18 FA Youth Cup final win over Arsenal.

=== Chelsea ===
On 25 September 2019, Anjorin made his debut for Chelsea in a 7–1 EFL Cup win over League Two side Grimsby Town. On 8 March 2020, he made his Premier League debut in a 4–0 home win over Everton after coming on as a 71st minute substitute for Willian. On 8 December 2020, Anjorin made his UEFA Champions League debut and was named in the starting line-up for Chelsea's final group stage match which ended in a 1–1 home draw against Krasnodar. On 10 January 2021, Anjorin made his FA Cup debut as a substitute for Callum Hudson-Odoi in the 80th minute of Chelsea's 4–0 win over League Two side Morecambe.

==== Loan to Lokomotiv Moscow ====
On 2 September 2021, he joined Russian Premier League club Lokomotiv Moscow on a season-long loan, with an option to buy. On 16 September 2021, he scored a late equaliser in the opening game of their Europa League campaign to establish the final score of 1–1 against Marseille. On 30 January 2022, the clubs agreed to terminate the loan early due to Anjorin's injury.

==== Loan to Huddersfield Town ====
Upon returning from his loan at Lokomotiv Moscow, Anjorin joined EFL Championship side Huddersfield Town on 31 January 2022 for the remainder of the 2021–22 season. He made seven league appearances and scored one goal for the Terriers, before his loan was extended for another year on 22 July 2022.

==== Loan to Portsmouth ====
On 31 August 2023, Anjorin joined League One club Portsmouth on a season-long loan deal.

=== Empoli ===
On 29 August 2024, Anjorin joined Serie A club Empoli on a permanent deal. He signed a three-year deal with the Italian club.

=== Torino ===
On 4 July 2025, Anjorin moved on loan to Serie A club Torino, with a conditional obligation to buy. He signed a contract with Torino until 2028, with an option for the 2028–29 season, the contract will be in place if the conditions for the obligation to buy are met.

==== Loan to Göztepe ====
On 4 September 2026, Anjorin joined Turkish Süper Lig club Göztepe, on loan with an option to buy.

== International career ==
Anjorin is eligible to play for England through his birthplace and for Nigeria through his Nigerian father. Between 2018 and 2019, he represented England at under-17, under-18 and under-19 levels.

On 7 October 2021, Anjorin made his England under-20 debut during a 1–1 draw with Italy at Technique Stadium in Chesterfield.

== Career statistics ==
As of match played 25 May 2025

Appearances and goals by club, season and competition
Club	Season	League			National cup (Note: Includes FA Cup)		League cup (Note: Includes EFL Cup)		Continental		Other		Total	
Club	Season	Division	Apps	Goals	Apps	Goals	Apps	Goals	Apps	Goals	Apps	Goals	Apps	Goals
Chelsea	2019–20	Premier League	1	0	0	0	1	0	0	0	—		2	0
Chelsea	2020–21	Premier League	0	0	2	0	0	0	1 (Note: Appearances in UEFA Champions League)	0	—		3	0
Chelsea	Total		1	0	2	0	1	0	1	0	0	0	5	0
Lokomotiv Moscow (loan)	2021–22	Russian Premier League	7	0	0	0	—		2 (Note: Appearances in UEFA Europa League)	1	—		9	1
Huddersfield Town (loan)	2021–22	Championship	7	1	1	0	—		—		—		8	1
Huddersfield Town (loan)	2022–23	Championship	8	2	0	0	1	0	—		—		9	2
Huddersfield Town (loan)	Total		15	3	1	0	1	0	0	0	0	0	17	3
Portsmouth (loan)	2023–24	League One	12	1	1	0	0	0	—		1 (Note: Appearances in EFL Trophy)	1	14	2
Empoli	2024–25	Serie A	22	2	0	0	—		—		—		22	2
Career total			57	6	4	0	2	0	3	1	1	1	67	8

== Honours ==
Portsmouth

- EFL League One: 2023–24
