= Lorenzo Venturino =

Italian footballer (born 2006)

Personal information
- Date of birth: 22 June 2006 (age 20)
- Place of birth: Genoa, Italy
- Height: 1.78 m (5 ft 10 in)
- Positions: Winger; attacking midfielder

Team information
- Current team: Genoa
- Number: 76

Youth career
- 2012–2013: Arenzano
- 2013–2025: Genoa

Senior career*
Years	Team	Apps	(Gls)
2025–	Genoa	8	(2)
2026	→ Roma (loan)	10	(0)

International career^{‡}
2024–2025	Italy U19	5	(0)
2025–	Italy U21	3	(0)
- * Club domestic league appearances and goals as of 23:32, 10 May 2026 (UTC) ‡ National team caps and goals as of 31 March 2026

Lorenzo Venturino (born 22 June 2006) is an Italian professional footballer who plays as a winger for Serie A club Genoa.

== Club career ==
A youth product of Arenzano, Venturino joined the youth academy of Genoa at the age of 7 where he finished his development. He made his senior and professional debut with Genoa as a substitute in a 3–1 Serie A loss to Roma on 17 January 2025.

On 5 March 2025, he signed his first professional contract with Genoa until 2029. Two months later, on 24 May, he netted his first Serie A goals by netting a brace in a 3–1 away victory against Bologna in the last match of the 2024–25 season. On 24 January 2026, he was loaned to Roma until the end of the season. He made his debut for the club 2 days later in a 1-1 draw against Milan, coming off the bench in place of Matías Soulé in the 85th minute.

== International career ==
In August 2024, Venturino was called up to the Italy U19s for a set of friendlies.

In May 2026, he was one of the players who were called up with the Italy national senior squad by interim head coach Silvio Baldini, for the friendly matches against Luxembourg and Greece on 3 and 7 June 2026, respectively.

== Playing style ==
Operating across various positions including the front line and wing-back, Venturino is noted for his ball control and ability to provide assists. He participates in both offensive and defensive duties.

== Career statistics ==
=== Club ===
As of match played 10 May 2026

Appearances and goals by club, season and competition
Club	Season	League			Coppa Italia		Europe		Total	
Club	Season	Division	Apps	Goals	Apps	Goals	Apps	Goals	Apps	Goals
Genoa	2024–25	Serie A	6	2	—		—		6	2
Genoa	2025–26	Serie A	2	0	3	0	—		5	0
Genoa	Total		8	2	3	0	—		11	2
Roma (loan)	2025–26	Serie A	10	0	0	0	0	0	10	0
Career total			18	2	3	0	0	0	21	2
