= Garcia Cugat Foundation =

Spanish non-profit organization

- Founded: 2007
- Founder: Montserrat Garcia Balletbó; Ramon Cugat
- Type: Non-profit foundation
- Purpose: Biomedical Research, Education,
- Location: Barcelona, Spain
- Region served: Global
- Method: Donations and Grants
- Website: www.fundaciongarciacugat.org

Garcia Cugat Foundation for Biomedical Research is a Spanish private non-profit organization dedicated to research in biological treatments constituted in 2007 by a group of physicians, veterinarians, and health professionals, although early research by some members began in 2002.

Initial research focused on the application of growth factors in bone, tendon, muscle, and ligament. In 2010, research on therapies with stem cells began in anterior cruciate ligament and cartilage injuries and specifically osteoarthritis. In 2013, the Garcia Cugat Foundation and the Universidad CEU Cardenal Herrera de Valencia created the Chair of Medicine and Regenerative Surgery.

== Research ==
In 2002, the study of Biologic Therapies with Proteins was started. From 2003 to 2005, a multidisciplinary research team consisting of physicians, veterinarians, and pharmacists was created and initiated the clinical application of growth factors obtained by the system that was developed by the Biotechnology Institute (BTI).

From 2003 to 2005, research began on Biological Therapies with Proteins: Growth Factors, with the creation of a multidisciplinary research team consisting of physicians, veterinarians, and pharmacists. Clinical application of growth factors began.

In 2007, the Garcia Cugat Foundation was formally established and several doctoral theses on growth factors were prepared.

In 2010, the research on stem cell therapies in the treatment of anterior cruciate ligament and cartilage injuries was initiated.

Highlighting a pioneering project for the treatment of osteoarthritis using mesenchymal cells derived from adipose tissue and plasma rich in growth factors underway in animals.

== About the foundation ==
The Garcia Cugat Foundation, based in Barcelona, is registered in the Spanish Ministry of Education and Science foundation's register dated 20 April 2007 and created with the aim of systematizing multidisciplinary work after several years of collaboration between doctors, veterinarians and health professionals.

It is named after the orthopedic surgeon José Garcia Cugat founder of the Spanish Arthroscopy Association. It is chaired by Dr. Montserrat Garcia Balletbó, investigator of biological treatments in tissue regeneration. The chairman of the board is Dr. Ramon Cugat, pioneer in Spanish arthroscopy and specialist in growth factor and stem cell treatments in trauma.

Among its members are Dr. Alejandro Tarragó, specialist in growth factor treatment in veterinary medicine, José Joaquín Ceron, Professor of Medicine and Animal Surgery, Faculty of Veterinary Medicine, University of Murcia, and José María Carrillo, professor of surgery at the Department of Medicine and Animal Surgery at the Universidad CEU Cardenal Herrera.

The foundation works with the Faculty of Veterinary Medicine, Murcia, Córdoba, Las Palmas, CEU Cardenal Herrera Valencia, in addition to the trauma department Hospital Quiron Barcelona, the Instituto Veterinario de Ortopedia y Traumatología IVOT, the Centro de Investigación Príncipe Felipe de Valencia.

== Dr. Jose Garcia Cugat Scholarships ==
The foundation provides scholarships for graduates in health sciences, Spanish or international, for those with limited resources or who are interested in research on biological therapeutic processes.
