= Alessandro Romano (footballer, born 2006) =

Footballer (born 2006)

Personal information
- Full name: Alessandro Gianni Romano
- Date of birth: 17 June 2006 (age 20)
- Place of birth: Winterthur, Switzerland
- Height: 1.80 m (5 ft 11 in)
- Position: Midfielder

Team information
- Current team: Cagliari (on loan from Roma)
- Number: 4

Youth career
- –2022: Winterthur
- 2022–2026: Roma

Senior career*
Years	Team	Apps	(Gls)
2025–	Roma	2	(0)
2026	→ Spezia (loan)	19	(0)
2026–	→ Cagliari (loan)	5	(1)

International career^{‡}
2021–2022	Switzerland U16	9	(0)
2022–2023	Switzerland U17	13	(3)
2023–2024	Switzerland U18	7	(1)
2024	Switzerland U19	4	(1)
2025	Switzerland U20	1	(0)
2026–	Italy	3	(0)
- * Club domestic league appearances and goals as of 08:02, 24 September 2026 (UTC) ‡ National team caps and goals as of 5 October 2026

Alessandro Gianni Romano (born 17 June 2006) is a professional footballer who plays as a midfielder for Serie A club Cagliari, on loan from Roma. Born in Switzerland, he plays for the Italy national team.

== Early life ==
Romano was born on 17 June 2006 in Winterthur, Switzerland and is of Italian descent through his parents, both born in Switzerland to Italian-born parents. His paternal side originates from Naples, while his maternal side is originally from Apulia. Romano is the son of Swiss footballer Umberto Romano, and the brother of Swiss footballer Luca Romano.

== Club career ==
=== Roma ===
As a youth player, Romano joined the youth academy of Swiss side Winterthur. Subsequently, he joined the youth academy of Serie A side Roma in 2022. In 2024, he was described as a regular starter for Roma's youth team and was highly regarded by Mister Falsini who decided to deploy him in front of the defense.

In 2025, he was promoted to the club's senior team. Romano made his Serie A debut for Roma on 6 January 2026 against Lecce.

==== Loan to Spezia ====
On 16 January 2026, Romano joined Spezia in Serie B, on a six-month loan for the remainder of the 2025–26 season.

==== Loan to Cagliari ====
On 1 July 2026, Romano joined Cagliari in Serie A, on loan from Roma with an obligation to buy for €5 million plus add-ons. He made his official debut for the club on 14 August in a Coppa Italia match. On 22 August, he scored his first goal for Cagliari in his Serie A debut against Parma.

== International career ==
Romano was a Switzerland youth international. During the summer of 2023, he played for the Switzerland national under-17 team at the 2023 UEFA European Under-17 Championship.

On 9 September 2026, FIFA approved a nationality switch request, with Romano opting to play for the Italy national team at senior level. He is eligible for the Azzurri thanks to his Italian-born grandparents.

Romano was one of the players who were called up with the Italy national team by head coach Roberto Mancini for the 2026–27 UEFA Nations League matches against Belgium, Turkey and France between 25 September and 5 October 2026.

== Style of play ==
Romano plays as a midfielder. He is left-footed, and is known for his work ethic, strength, technical ability, and vision.

== Career statistics ==
=== Club ===
As of match played 19 September 2026

Appearances and goals by club, season and competition
Club	Season	League			Coppa Italia		Europe		Other		Total	
Club	Season	Division	Apps	Goals	Apps	Goals	Apps	Goals	Apps	Goals	Apps	Goals
Roma	2025–26	Serie A	2	0	—		—		—		2	0
Spezia (loan)	2025–26	Serie B	19	0	—		—		—		19	0
Cagliari (loan)	2026–27	Serie A	5	1	2	0	—		—		7	1
Career total			26	1	2	0	0	0	0	0	28	1

=== International ===
As of match played 5 October 2026

Appearances and goals by national team and year
National team	Year	Apps	Goals
Italy	2026	3	0
Total		3	0
