= Neil El Aynaoui =

Moroccan footballer (born 2001)

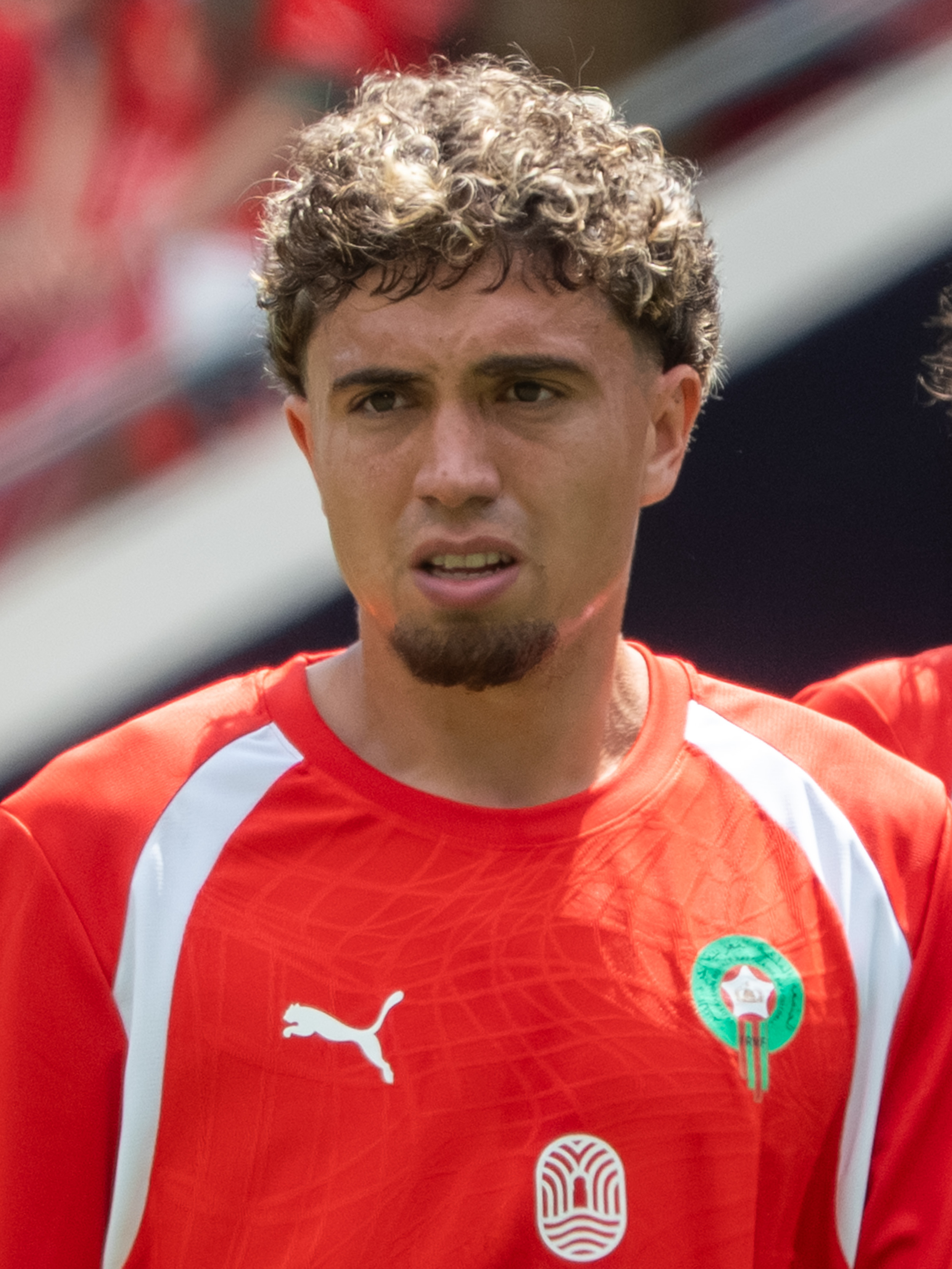
- El Aynaoui with Morocco in 2026

Personal information
- Full name: Neil Yoni El Aynaoui
- Date of birth: 2 July 2001 (age 25)
- Place of birth: Nancy, France
- Height: 1.86 m (6 ft 1 in)
- Position: Central midfielder

Team information
- Current team: RB Leipzig (on loan from Roma)
- Number: 21

Youth career
- 2009–2020: Nancy

Senior career*
Years	Team	Apps	(Gls)
2018–2021	Nancy B	10	(0)
2021–2023	Nancy	67	(6)
2023	Lens B	1	(2)
2023–2025	Lens	49	(9)
2025–	Roma	26	(1)
2026–	→ RB Leipzig (loan)	6	(0)

International career^{‡}
2023	Morocco U23	1	(0)
2025–	Morocco	25	(2)
Medal record
Men's football
Representing Morocco
Africa Cup of Nations
Winner	2025 Morocco
- * Club domestic league appearances and goals as of 17:30, 31 October 2026 (UTC) ‡ National team caps and goals as of 4 October 2026

Neil Yoni El Aynaoui (Arabic: نائل العيناوي; born 2 July 2001) is a professional footballer who plays as a central midfielder for Bundesliga club RB Leipzig, on loan from Serie A club Roma. Born in France, he represents the Morocco national team.

== Club career ==
=== Nancy ===
El Aynaoui joined the youth academy of Nancy when he was 18, and signed his first professional contract with the club on 3 June 2021. He made his professional debut with Nancy in a 4–0 Ligue 2 loss to Toulouse on 31 July 2021.

=== Lens ===
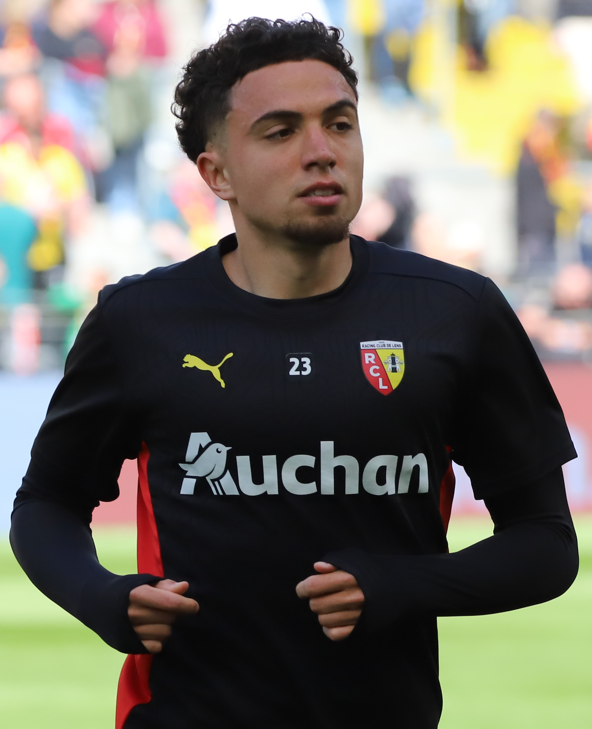
El Aynaoui playing for Lens in 2023

On 29 June 2023, El Aynaoui signed for Ligue 1 club Lens on a four-year contract. He scored his first goal on 28 October 2023 against FC Nantes.

=== Roma ===
On 20 July 2025, El Aynaoui moved to Roma in Italy on a five-year contract. He made his debut for the club against Bologna on matchday 1 of the Serie A, by coming off the bench in the 60th minute in place of El Shaarawy.

He scored his first goal for Roma in a Europa League match against Midtjylland on 27 November 2025.

==== Loan to RB Leipzig ====
On 1 September 2026, El Aynaoui joined Bundesliga side RB Leipzig on loan with an option to buy.

== International career ==
Born in France, El Aynaoui holds French and Moroccan nationalities. He was called up to the Morocco U23s for a set of friendlies in September 2023.

On 11 December 2025, El Aynaoui was called up to the Morocco squad for the 2025 Africa Cup of Nations. In the final, he iconically got injured in his eye, where they treated him with a bandage and he kept playing to contribute and to participate in the Final.

On 26 May 2026, El Aynaoui was selected in the 26-man squad for the 2026 FIFA World Cup.

== Personal life ==
El Aynaoui is the son of the Moroccan retired tennis player Younes El Aynaoui with Anne-Sophie Rocher, a Frenchwoman.. He is married to Chaimaa El Aynaoui. She announced their marriage via Instagram in 2026.

== Career statistics ==
=== Club ===
As of match played 31 October 2026

Appearances and goals by club, season and competition
Club	Season	League			National cup (Note: Includes Coupe de France)		Europe		Total	
Club	Season	Division	Apps	Goals	Apps	Goals	Apps	Goals	Apps	Goals
Nancy B	2020–21	CFA 2	4	0	—		—		4	0
Nancy B	2021–22	CFA 2	5	0	—		—		5	0
Nancy B	2022–23	Ligue 3	33	4	—		—		33	4
Nancy B	Total		42	4	—		—		42	4
Nancy	2021–22	Ligue 2	24	2	0	0	—		24	2
Lens B	2023–24	CFA 2	1	2	—		—		1	2
Lens	2023–24	Ligue 1	25	1	1	0	5 (Note: Three appearances in UEFA Champions League, two appearances in UEFA Europa League)	0	31	1
Lens	2024–25	Ligue 1	23	8	1	0	0	0	24	8
Lens	Total		48	9	2	0	5	0	55	9
Roma	2025–26	Serie A	25	1	0	0	9 (Note: Appearances in UEFA Europa League)	1	34	2
Roma	2026–27	Serie A	1	0	—		—		1	0
Roma	Total		26	1	0	0	9	1	35	2
RB Leipzig (loan)	2026–27	Bundesliga	6	0	1	0	3 (Note: Appearances in UEFA Champions League)	0	10	0
Career total			147	15	3	0	17	1	167	16

=== International ===
As of match played 4 October 2026

Appearances and goals by national team and year
National team	Year	Apps	Goals
Morocco	2025	9	0
Morocco	2026	16	2
Total		25	2

Morocco score listed first, score column indicates score after each El Aynaoui goal.

List of international goals scored by Neil El Aynaoui
No.	Date	Venue	Opponent	Score	Result	Competition
1	27 March 2026	Metropolitano Stadium, Madrid, Spain	Ecuador	1–1	1–1	Friendly
2	31 March 2026	Stade Bollaert-Delelis, Lens, France	Paraguay	2–0	2–1	Friendly

== Honours ==
Morocco

- Africa Cup of Nations: 2025
