= Ramon Cugat =

Spanish orthopedic surgeon (born 1950)

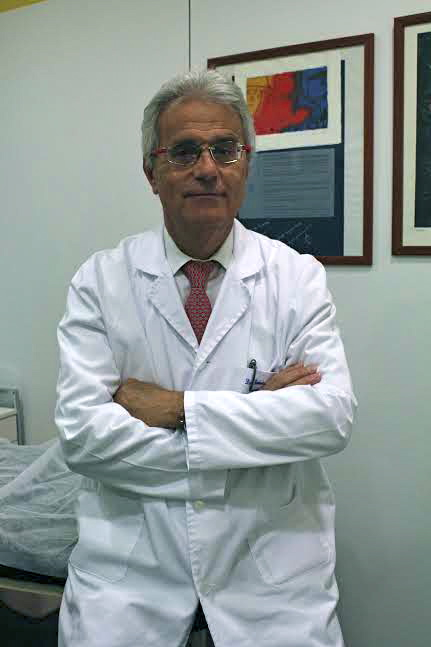
- Born: Ramon Cugat Bertomeu; 25 August 1950 (age 76); L'Aldea, Spain
- Occupation: Orthopedic Surgery

Ramon (Ramón) Cugat Bertomeu (born 25 August 1950) is a Spanish surgeon specializing in orthopedic surgery, orthopaedic sports medicine, and arthroscopy. Cugat's first venture into sports was as a member of the team of orthopedic surgeons during the 1992 Summer Olympics in Barcelona. Since then, he has been bound to the Catalan Mutual Insurance of Football where he has operated on thousands of players from all categories most often the Association football players of FC Barcelona, among those being Pep Guardiola, Xavi, Samuel Eto'o, Andrés Iniesta, Carles Puyol, David Villa, Luis Suárez and Fernando Torres. He has also operated on multiple Manchester City players, including Benjamin Mendy, Ilkay Gundogan, David Silva, Kevin de Bruyne and Aymeric Laporte.

Ramon Cugat's career expands throughout different countries such as Spain, England and the United States. He is currently co-director of the Department of Orthopaedic Surgery and Traumatology Hospital Quiron Barcelona, chairman of the board of the Garcia Cugat Foundation for Biomedical Research and President of the Medical Council at the Catalan Mutual Insurance of Football under the Royal Spanish Football Federation. He is Associate Professor at the Faculty of Medicine of the University of Barcelona.

== Biography ==
=== Life and career ===
Ramon Cugat was born in L' Aldea, Spain on 25 August 1950 in a farming family. At the age of 15, he moved away from the rural life to Barcelona in 1965, where he was selected to play for the youth team of FC Barcelona until 1971.

In 1969 he enrolled at the Faculty of Medicine of the University of Barcelona and started his venture in sports medicine under the guidance of Dr. Jose Garcia Cugat, founder of the Spanish Arthroscopy Association. By 1975, he had graduated in medicine and surgery and in the next two years he received his doctorate and obtained the title of specialist in orthopedic and trauma surgery. By then, he was also completing his first major in England in 1979. Ramon Cugat learned arthroscopy in England and the United States in the late 70s. He trained at Massachusetts General Hospital under the guidance of Dr. Bertram Zarins and has continued collaboration with him.

=== Medical career ===
In 1980, Ramon Cugat began his collaboration with Bertram Zarins, Head of Sports Medicine at Massachusetts General Hospital at Harvard University in the United States. He was a founding member of the Spanish Arthroscopy Association created in 1982 and chaired this organization from 1993 to 1995.

In 1990, he returned to Spain to be appointed Associate Professor at the Faculty of Medicine at the University of Barcelona. In 1991, he was appointed as orthopaedic surgeon to the American Football Team of Barcelona Dragons, a member of the Barcelona sport organisation. He was appointed a member of the team of orthopedic surgeons during the 1992 Summer Olympics in Barcelona.

From 1992 to 2004 he worked as medical assistant in the Department of Trauma and Orthopedics at the Hospital del Mar in Barcelona directing the Arthroscopic Surgery Unit.

In 2007, he joined Hospital Quiron Barcelona assuming the position of co-director of the Department of Orthopaedic Surgery and Trauma where he continues today.

=== Personal life ===
Ramon Cugat is married to Montserrat Garcia Balletbó, a pathology specialist currently focused on the investigation of biological therapies. They have three children: Debora, Coco and Pepe.

== Academic career ==
From 1989 to 1993, he was member of the Board of the International Arthroscopy Association, an organization that was transformed in 1995 into the International Society of Arthroscopy, Knee Surgery and Orthopaedic Sports Medicine (ISAKOS) which Ramon Cugat has actively been part of since its inception, collaborating as professor in international congresses in India, China, Georgia, Latvia, Cuba, Brazil, Peru, Chile, Argentina and Turkey among others.

Since 1999, his practice has been recognized as an ISAKOS-Approved Teaching Center and numerous students visit his center in Barcelona every year for training.

In 2016, Dr. Ramon Cugat became a full academician of the Royal European Academy of Doctors.

== Medical Research ==
In early 2000, he initiated research in regenerative medicine and its application in trauma with Plasma Rich in Growth factors alongside Dr. Eduardo Anitua and Mikel Sanchez and has become an international reference in this treatment.

His collaboration with teams of veterinary surgeons, initially in Valencia and Barcelona, and then the Canary Islands, Murcia and Andalusia, culminated in 2007 with the creation of the Garcia Cugat Foundation for Biomedical Research of which he is chairman of the board.

Since 2010, through the Garcia Cugat Foundation he started research on the application of stem cells in lesions of the musculoskeletal system, initially in animals and in 2013 in human.

== Publications ==
His publications on the use of plasma rich in growth factors include:

- Histological Study of the Influence of Plasma Rich in Growth Factors (PRGF) on the Healing of Divided Achilles Tendons in Sheep. J. Andrés Fernández-Sarmiento, Juan M. Domínguez, María M. Granados, Juan Morgaz, Rocío Navarrete, José M. Carrillo, Rafael J. Gómez-Villamandos, Pilar Muñoz Rascón, Juana Martín de Mulas, Yolanda Millán, Montserrat García Balletbó and Ramón Cugat. The Journal of Bone and Joint Surgery, Incorporated. 2013
- Healing of donor site in bone-tendon-bone ACL reconstruction accelerated with plasma rich in growth factors: a randomized clinical trial. Roberto Seijas, Marta Rius, Oscar Ares, Montserrat García Balletbó, Iván Serra, Ramón Cugat. Knee Surg Sports Traumatol Arthrosc. November 2013
- Controlled, blinded force platform analysis of the effect of intraarticular injection of autologous adipose-derived mesenchymal stem cells associated to PRGF-Endoret in osteoarthritic docs. Jose M Milar, Manuel Morales, Angelo Santana, Giuseppe Spinella, Mónica Rubio, Belen Cuervo, Ramón Cugat and Jose M. Carrillo. BMC Veterinary Research 2013
- Effect of autologous platelet-rich plasma on the repair of full-thickness articular defects in rabbits. Claudio Iván Serra, Carme Soler, José M. Carrillo, Joaquín J. Sopena, J.Ignacio Redondo, Ramón Cugat. Knee Surg Sports Traumatol Arthrosc. 2013
- Platelet-rich plasma for calcific tendinitis of the shoulder: a case report. Roberto Seijas, Oscar Ares, Pedro Álvarez, Xavier Cuscó, Montserrat García Balletbó, Ramón Cugat. Journal of Orthopaedic Surgery 2012
- Delayed union of the clavicle treated with plasma rich in growth factors. Roberto Seijas, Romen Y. Santana-Suárez, Montserrat García Balletbó, Xavier Cuscó, Oscar Ares, Ramón Cugat. Acta Irtgio, Belg, 2010 76, 689–693. 2010
- Infiltration of plasma rich in growth factors for osteoarthritis of the knee short-term effects on function and quality of life. Ana Wang Saegusa, Ramón Cugat, Oscar Ares, Roberto Seijas, Javier Cuscó, Montserrat García Balletbó. Arch Orthop Trauma Surg. August 2010
