= 2025–26 US Lecce season =

Lecce
2025–26 season
- Owner: Saverio Sticchi Damiani
- President: Saverio Sticchi Damiani
- Head coach: Eusebio Di Francesco
- Stadium: Stadio Via del mare
- Serie A: 17th
- Coppa Italia: 2nd Round
- Top goalscorer: League: Lameck Banda (5); All: Lameck Banda (5)
- Highest home attendance: 28,277 v Como; 27 December 2025 (Serie A)
- Lowest home attendance: 10,667 v Juve Stabia; 15 August 2025 (Coppa Italia)
- Average home league attendance: 24,550
- Biggest win: 2–0 v Juve Stabia (H); 15 August 2025 (Coppa Italia); 2–0 v Cagliari (A); 16 February 2026 (Serie A)
- Biggest defeat: 0–3 v AC Milan (A); 23 September 2025 (Coppa Italia); 0–3 v Como (H); 27 December 2025 (Serie A); 0–3 v Atalanta (H); 6 April 2026 (Serie A)
Home colours	Away colours	Third colours

The 2025-26 season was the 118th season in the history of the US Lecce, and was its fourth consecutive season in Serie A. In addition to the domestic league, the team participated in the Coppa Italia. It finished the season in 17th place, just outside the relegation zone, and will compete in Serie A again next season.

== Players ==
=== Squad information ===
Players, appearances, goals and squad numbers last updated on 19 April 2026. Appearances and goals include all official competition matches.
Note: Flags indicate national team as has been defined under FIFA eligibility rules. Players may hold more than one non-FIFA nationality.

No.	Player	Nat.	Position(s)	Date of birth (age)	Signed in	Contract ends	Signed from	Transfer fee	Apps.	Goals
Goalkeepers
1	Christian Früchtl	(Germany)	GK	January 28, 2000 (age 26)	2024	2027	Austria Wien	€1M	1	0
30	Wladimiro Falcone (c)	(Italy)	GK	12 April 1995 (age 31)	2023	2028	(Italy) Sampdoria	€4M	146	0
32	Jasper Samooja	(Finland)	GK	July 21, 2003 (age 23)	2022	2026	(Finland) Honka	N/A	17	0
33	Plamen Penev	(Bulgaria)	GK	April 22, 2008 (age 18)	2025	—	(Italy) Youth Sector	N/A	0	0
95	Daniele Bleve	(Italy)	GK	June 23, 2008 (age 18)	2025	—	(Italy) Youth Sector	N/A	0	0
Defenders
3	Corrie Ndaba	(Republic of Ireland)	LB	25 December 1999 (age 26)	2025	2028	(Scotland) Kilmarnock	€0.93M	13	0
4	Kialonda Gaspar	(Angola)	CB	27 September 1997 (age 29)	2024	2027	(Portugal) Estrela Amadora	€2M	46	1
5	Jamil Siebert	(Germany)	CB	2 April 2002 (age 24)	2025	2028	(Germany) Fortuna Düsseldorf	€5.5M	15	1
13	Matías Pérez	(Chile)	CB	13 April 2005 (age 21)	2025	2028	(Chile) Curicó Unido	€0.53M	1	0
17	Danilo Veiga	(Portugal)	RB	25 September 2002 (age 24)	2025	2027	(Portugal) Estrela Amadora	€1M	43	0
18	Gaby Jean	(France)	CB	19 February 2000 (age 26)	2024	2027	(France) Annecy	€1M	21	0
25	Antonino Gallo	(Italy)	LB	5 January 2000 (age 26)	2019	2026	(Italy) Palermo	Free	151	1
44	Tiago Gabriel	(Portugal)	CB	26 December 2004 (age 21)	2025	2027	(Portugal) Estrela Amadora	€1.25M	34	1
Midfielders
6	Álex Sala	(Spain)	CM	9 April 2001 (age 25)	2025	2028	(Spain) Córdoba	€1.5M	9	0
8	Sadik Fofana	(Togo)	DM	16 May 2003 (age 23)	2026	2029	(Austria) Grazer AK	€0.6	5	0
10	Medon Berisha	(Albania)	CM	21 October 2003 (age 23)	2022	2028	(Italy) Youth Sector	N/A	36	2
14	Þórir Jóhann Helgason	(Iceland)	CM	28 September 2000 (age 26)	2021	2026	(Iceland) Hafnarfjördur	N/A	65	1
16	Omri Gandelman	(Israel)	AM	16 May 2000 (age 26)	2026	2029	(Belgium) Gent	€3M	14	2
20	Ylber Ramadani	(Albania)	DM	12 April 1996 (age 30)	2023	2026	(Scotland) Aberdeen	€1.2M	94	3
28	Olaf Gorter	(Netherlands)	DM	31 January 2005 (age 21)	2024	—	(Italy) Youth Sector	N/A	2	0
29	Lassana Coulibaly	(Mali)	CM	10 April 1996 (age 30)	2024	2027	(Italy) Salernitana	€1.8M	65	4
36	Filip Marchwinski	(Poland)	AM	10 January 2002 (age 24)	2024	2028	(Poland) Lech Poznan	€3M	3	0
79	Oumar Ngom	(Mauritania)	DM	9 March 2004 (age 22)	2026	2029	(Portugal) Estrela da Amadora	€2M	9	0
80	Niko Kovač	(Bosnia and Herzegovina)	CM	8 April 2005 (age 21)	2025	—	(Italy) Youth Sector	N/A	0	0
Forwards
9	Nikola Štulić	(Serbia)	CF	8 September 2001 (age 25)	2025	2029	(Belgium) Charleroi	€5M	30	3
11	Konan N'Dri	(Niger)	RW	27 October 2000 (age 26)	2025	2027	(Belgium) OH Leuven	€1.5M	33	1
19	Lameck Banda	(Zambia)	LW	29 January 2001 (age 25)	2022	2026	(Israel) Maccabi Petah Tikva	€2M	98	7
22	Francesco Camarda	(Italy)	CF	10 March 2008 (age 18)	2025	2026	(Italy) AC Milan	Loan (Free)	17	1
23	Riccardo Sottil	(Italy)	LW	3 June 1999 (age 27)	2025	2026	(Italy) Fiorentina	Loan (€0.8M)	21	1
50	Santiago Pierotti	(Argentina)	RW	3 April 2001 (age 25)	2024	2027	(Argentina) Colón	€1.2M	78	5
99	Walid Cheddira	(Morocco)	CF	22 January 1998 (age 28)	2026	2026	(Italy) Napoli	Loan (Free)	11	0

== Transfers ==
=== Summer window ===
==== In ====
Date	Pos.	Player	From	Fee	Notes	Ref.
1 July 2025	DF	(Ivory Coast) Christ-Owen Kouassi	(France) Laval	€1,000,000		
19 July 2025	DF	(Chile) Matías Pérez	(Chile) Curicó Unido	€525,000		
28 July 2025	DF	(Republic of Ireland) Corrie Ndaba	(Scotland) Kilmarnock	€930,000		
22 August 2025	DF	(Germany) Jamil Siebert	(Germany) Fortuna Düsseldorf	€5,500,000		
23 August 2025	MF	(Spain) Álex Sala	(Spain) Córdoba	€1,500,000		
27 August 2025	FW	(Serbia) Nikola Štulić	(Belgium) Charleroi	€5,000,000		
29 August 2025	FW	(Serbia) Miloš Jović	(Serbia) IMT	€1,000,000		

==== Loans in ====
Date	Pos.	Player	Moving from	Fee	Notes	Ref.
7 July 2025	FW	(Italy) Francesco Camarda	(Italy) AC Milan	Free	Option to buy for €3,000,000 + buy-back option for €4,000,000	
10 August 2025	FW	(Italy) Riccardo Sottil	(Italy) Fiorentina	€500,000	Option to buy for €10,000,000	

==== Loan returns ====
Date	Pos.	Player	From
30 June 2025	GK	(Romania) Alexandru Borbei	(Romania) CFR Cluj
30 June 2025	GK	(Italy) Marco Bleve	(Italy) Carrarese
30 June 2025	GK	(Croatia) Lovro Herceg	(Italy) Nardò
30 June 2025	DF	(Belgium) Mats Lemmens	(Belgium) Molenbeek
30 June 2025	MF	(Italy) Giacomo Faticanti	(Italy) Juventus Next Gen
30 June 2025	MF	(Morocco) Youssef Maleh	(Italy) Empoli
30 June 2025	MF	(Republic of Ireland) Ed McJannet	(Italy) Audace Cerignola
30 June 2025	MF	(France) Rémi Oudin	(Italy) Sampdoria
30 June 2025	MF	(Czech Republic) Daniel Samek	(Czech Republic) Hradec Králové
30 June 2025	FW	(Finland) Eetu Mömmö	(Finland) Haka
30 June 2025	FW	(Spain) Pablo Rodríguez	(Spain) Racing de Santander
30 June 2025	FW	(Finland) Henri Salomaa	(Italy) Lucchese

=== Out ===
==== Transfers ====
Date	Pos.	Player	Age	Moving to	Fee	Notes	Ref.
1 July 2025	DF	(Belgium) Mats Lemmens	23	(Belgium) Molenbeek	Free	From loan to permanent transfer	

==== Released players ====
Date	Pos.	Player	Subsequent club	Ref.
1 July 2025	FW	(Croatia) Ante Rebić	(Croatia) Hajduk Split	
1 July 2025	FW	(Italy) Nicola Sansone	Free agent	
1 July 2025	FW	(Denmark) Jeppe Corfitzen	Free agent	

==== Loans out ====
Date	Pos.	Player	Age	Moving to	Fee	Ref.

=== Winter window ===
==== In ====
Date	Pos.	Player	Age	Moving from	Fee	Notes	Ref.

==== Loans in ====
Date	Pos.	Player	Age	Moving from	Fee	Notes	Ref.
22 January 2026	FW	(Morocco) Walid Cheddira	28	(Italy) Napoli			

==== Out ====
Date	Pos.	Player	Age	Moving to	Fee	Notes	Ref.

==== Loans out ====
Date	Pos.	Player	Age	Moving to	Fee	Notes	Ref.

== Competitions ==
=== Overview ===
Competition	First match	Last match	Starting round	Final position	Record							
Competition	First match	Last match	Starting round	Final position	Pld	W	D	L	GF	GA	GD	Win %
Serie A	23 August 2025	24 May 2026	Matchday 1	17	38	10	8	20	28	50	−22	26.32
Coppa Italia	15 August 2025	23 September 2025	First Round	Second Round	2	1	0	1	2	3	−1	50.00
Total					40	11	8	21	30	53	−23	27.50

Last updated: 24 May 2026
Source: Soccerway

=== Serie A ===
==== League table ====
Pos	Team	Pld	W	D	L	GF	GA	GD	Pts	Qualification or relegation
15	Fiorentina	38	9	15	14	41	50	−9	42	
16	Genoa	38	10	11	17	41	51	−10	41	
17	Lecce	38	10	8	20	28	50	−22	38	
18	Cremonese (R)	38	8	10	20	32	57	−25	34	Relegation to Serie B
19	Hellas Verona (R)	38	3	12	23	25	61	−36	21	Relegation to Serie B

Source: Serie A
Rules for classification: 1) Points; 2) Tiebreaker for Champions team and third relegated team; 3) Head-to-head points; 4) Head-to-head goal difference; 5) Goal difference; 6) Goals scored; 7) Draw.
(Note: Head-to-head record is used only after all the matches between the teams in question have been played)
(R) Relegated

==== Results summary ====
Overall								Home						Away					
Pld	W	D	L	GF	GA	GD	Pts	W	D	L	GF	GA	GD	W	D	L	GF	GA	GD
38	10	8	20	28	50	−22	38	5	5	9	13	24	−11	5	3	11	15	26	−11

Last updated: 24 May 2026.
Source: Serie A

==== Results by round ====
Round	1	2	3	4	5	6	7	8	9	10	11	12	13	14	15	17	18	19	20	16^{1}	21	22	23	24	25	26	27	28	29	30	31	32	33	34	35	36	37	38
Ground	A	H	A	H	H	A	H	A	H	A	H	A	H	A	H	H	A	H	H	A	A	H	A	H	A	H	A	H	A	A	H	A	H	A	A	H	A	H
Result	D	L	L	L	D	W	D	L	L	W	D	L	W	L	W	L	D	L	L	L	L	D	L	W	W	L	L	W	L	L	L	L	D	D	W	L	W	W
Position	14	17	20	20	20	15	16	16	16	15	15	17	14	17	14					17	18	17	17	17	17	18	18	16	17	18	18	18	18	17	17	17	17	17

Updated to match(es) played on 24 May 2026. Source: Serie A
A = Away; H = Home; W = Win; D = Draw; L = Loss

^{1} Matchday 16 match (at Inter) was postponed due to Inter's participation in the Supercoppa Italiana.

==== Matches ====
The league fixtures were released on 6 June 2025.

23 August 2025 1	Genoa	0–0	Lecce	Genova
18:30 CEST (UTC+2)	Martín (yellow card) 75'; Ekhator (yellow card) 86'	Report	Banda (yellow card) 22'; Veiga (yellow card) 36'; Tete Morente (yellow card) 76'	Stadium: Stadio Luigi Ferraris; Attendance: 32,576; Referee: Davide Massa

29 August 2025 2	Lecce	0–2	Milan	Lecce
20:45 CEST (UTC+2)	Gaspar (yellow card) 65'	Report	Loftus-Cheek 66'; Pulisic 86'	Stadium: Stadio Via del mare Attendance: 28,227; Referee: Livio Marinelli

14 September 2025 3	Atalanta	4–1	Lecce	Bergamo
15:00 CEST (UTC+2)	Scalvini 37'; De Ketelaere 51', 73'; Zalewski 70'	Report	N'Dri 82'	Stadium: Stadio Atleti Azzurri d'Italia; Attendance: 21,973; Referee: Gianluca Manganiello

19 September 2025 4	Lecce	1–2	Cagliari	Lecce
20:45 CEST (UTC+2)	Gabriel 5', (yellow card) 20'; Coulibaly (yellow card) 26'	Report	Belotti 33', 71' (pen.); Esposito (yellow card) 45'; Prati (yellow card) 58'; Obert (yellow card) 81'	Stadium: Stadio Via del mare Attendance: 26,219; Referee: Luca Zufferli

28 September 2025 5	Lecce	2–2	Bologna	Lecce
18:00 CEST (UTC+2)	Coulibaly 13'; Gaspar (yellow card) 55'; Ramadani (yellow card) 61'; Gallo (yellow card) 68'; Camarda 90+4', (yellow card) 90+5'	Report	Dallinga (yellow card) 30'; Orsolini 45' (pen.); Odgaard 71'; Bernardeschi (yellow card) 89'	Stadium: Stadio Via del mare Attendance: 24,548; Referee: Francesco Fourneau

4 October 2025 6	Parma	0–1	Lecce	Parma
15:00 CEST (UTC+2)	Ndiaye (yellow card) 82'	Report	Sottil 38'; Banda (yellow card) 90+2'; Gaspar (yellow card) 90+7'	Stadium: Stadio Ennio Tardini; Attendance: 19,580; Referee: Daniele Doveri

18 October 2025 7	Lecce	0–0	Sassuolo	Lecce
15:00 CEST (UTC+2)	Veiga (yellow card) 84'; Falcone (yellow card) 90+4'	Report	Berardi (yellow card) 82'; Doig (yellow card) 90+6'	Stadium: Stadio Via del mare Attendance: 25,307; Referee: Valerio Crezzini

25 October 2025 8	Udinese	3–2	Lecce	Udine
15:00 CEST (UTC+2)	Karlström 16'; Davis 37', (yellow card) 41'; Buksa 89', (yellow card) 90'	Report	Stulic (yellow card) 32'; Gaspar (yellow card) 45+2'; Berisha 59'; N'Dri 90+6'	Stadium: Stadio Friuli; Attendance: 21,441; Referee: Ermanno Feliciani

28 October 2025 9	Lecce	0–1	Napoli	Lecce
18:30 CET (UTC+1)	Ramadani (yellow card) 62'; N'Dri (yellow card) 88'	Report	Olivera (yellow card) 26'; Anguissa 69'	Stadium: Stadio Via del mare Attendance: 25,569; Referee: Giuseppe Collu

2 November 2025 10	Fiorentina	0–1	Lecce	Florence
15:00 CET (UTC+1)	Caviglia (yellow card) 14'; Fagioli (yellow card) 15'; Kean (yellow card) 66'; Ranieri (yellow card) 87'	Report	Berisha 23'; Veiga (yellow card) 41'	Stadium: Stadio Artemio Franchi; Attendance: 18,184; Referee: Antonio Rapuano

8 November 2025 11	Lecce	0–0	Hellas Verona	Lecce
15:00 CET (UTC+1)	Coulibaly (yellow card) 40'	Report	Akpro (yellow card) 31'; Valentini (yellow card) 43'; Bradaric (yellow card) 54'; Frese (yellow card) 90+5'	Stadium: Stadio Via del mare Attendance: 24,678; Referee: Rosario Abisso

23 November 2025 12	Lazio	2–0	Lecce	Rome
18:00 CET (UTC+1)	Guendouzi 29', (yellow card) 79'; Noslin 90+5'	Report	N'Dri (yellow card) 82'	Stadium: Stadio Olimpico; Attendance: 25,000; Referee: Alberto Ruben Arena

30 November 2025 13	Lecce	2–1	Torino	Lecce
12:30 CET (UTC+1)	Coulibaly 20', (yellow card) 81'; Banda 22'; Ramadani (yellow card) 80'	Report	Adams 57'; Casadei (yellow card) 78'; Coco (yellow card) 83'; Ngonge (yellow card) 90+3'	Stadium: Stadio Via del mare Attendance: 24,776; Referee: Maurizio Mariani

7 December 2025 14	Cremonese	2–0	Lecce	Cremona
12:30 CET (UTC+1)	Bonazzoli 53' (pen.); Sanabria 78'; Bianchetti (yellow card) 83'	Report	Banda (yellow card) 45+3'; Gallo (yellow card) 85'	Stadium: Stadio Giovanni Zini; Attendance: 13,276; Referee: Giuseppe Mucera

12 December 2025 15	Lecce	1–0	Pisa	Lecce
20:45 CET (UTC+1)	Štulić 72'; Morente (yellow card) 85'; Gaspar (yellow card) 90'	Report	Calabresi (yellow card) 33'	Stadium: Stadio Via del mare Attendance: 24,332; Referee: Juan Luca Sacchi

27 December 2025 17	Lecce	0–3	Como	Lecce
15:00 CET (UTC+1)	Sottil (yellow card) 22'; Ramadani (yellow card) 81'	Report	Paz 20'; Smolčić (yellow card) 34'; Butez (yellow card) 54'; Carlos (yellow card) 56'; Ramón 66'; Perrone (yellow card) 71'; Douvikas 75'	Stadium: Stadio Via del mare Attendance: 28,277; Referee: Matteo Marchetti

3 January 2026 18	Juventus	1–1	Lecce	Turin
18:00 CET (UTC+1)	McKennie 49'	Report	Banda 45+2'; Maleh (yellow card) 61'; Veiga (yellow card) 70'; Falcone (yellow card) 90+5'	Stadium: Juventus Stadium; Attendance: 40,639; Referee: Giuseppe Collu

6 January 2026 19	Lecce	0–2	Roma	Lecce
18:00 CET (UTC+1)	Banda (yellow card) 5'; Maleh (yellow card) 28'; Gaspar (yellow card) 86'	Report	Ferguson 14'; Dovbyk 71'; Cristante (yellow card) 86'	Stadium: Stadio Via del mare Attendance: 24,715; Referee: Juan Luca Sacchi

11 January 2026 20	Lecce	1–2	Parma	Lecce
12:30 CET (UTC+1)	Štulić 1'; Pierotti (yellow card) 23'; Ramadani (yellow card) 55'; Banda (red card) 57'; Kaba (yellow card) 62'; Gaspar (red card) 90+3'	Report	Gabriel 64' (o.g.); Del Prato (yellow card) 69'; Pellegrino 72'	Stadium: Stadio Via del mare Attendance: 24,587; Referee: Livio Marinelli

14 January 2026 16	Internazionale	1–0	Lecce	Milan
20:45 CET (UTC+1)	Thuram (yellow card) 17'; Esposito 78'; Henrique (yellow card) 90+4'	Report	Veiga (yellow card) 63'	Stadium: San Siro; Attendance: 69,321; Referee: Fabio Maresca
Note: The match was originally scheduled for 21 December 2025, but was postponed due to Inter's participation in the Supercoppa Italiana.

18 January 2026 21	Milan	1–0	Lecce	Milan
20:45 CET (UTC+1)	De Winter (yellow card) 21'; Füllkrug 76'	Report	Ramadani (yellow card) 84'	Stadium: San Siro; Attendance: 70,591; Referee: Luca Zufferli

24 January 2026 22	Lecce	0–0	Lazio	Lecce
20:45 CET (UTC+1)	Veiga (yellow card) 51'; Gabriel (yellow card) 90+1'	Report	Provstgaard (yellow card) 73'	Stadium: Stadio Via del mare Attendance: 24,435; Referee: Daniele Chiffi

1 February 2026 23	Torino	1–0	Lecce	Turin
12:30 CET (UTC+1)	Adams 29'; Vlašić (yellow card) 45'; Prati (yellow card) 90+5'	Report	Gabriel (yellow card) 60'; Ramadani (yellow card) 71'	Stadium: Stadio Olimpico Grande Torino; Attendance: 6,000; Referee: Simone Sozza

8 February 2026 24	Lecce	2–1	Udinese	Lecce
15:00 CET (UTC+1)	Gandelman 5'; Banda (yellow card) 84', (goal) 90'	Report	Solet 26' (pen.); Bertola (yellow card) 64'; Gueye (yellow card) 89'	Stadium: Stadio Via del mare Attendance: 24,290; Referee: Antonio Rapuano

16 February 2026 25	Cagliari	0–2	Lecce	Cagliari
20:45 CET (UTC+1)		Report	Gandelman 65'; Ramadani 76'	Stadium: Unipol Domus; Attendance: 16,133; Referee: Ermanno Feliciani

21 February 2026 26	Lecce	0–2	Internazionale	Lecce
18:00 CET (UTC+1)	Gabriel (yellow card) 17'	Report	de Vrij (yellow card) 10'; Mkhitaryan 75'; Akanji 82'; Bastoni (yellow card) 87'	Stadium: Stadio Via del mare Attendance: 26,868; Referee: Gianluca Manganiello

28 February 2026 27	Como	3–1	Lecce	Como
15:00 CET (UTC+1)	Douvikas 18'; Rodríguez 36'; Kempf 44'	Report	Coulibaly 13'; Banda (yellow card) 70'	Stadium: Stadio Giuseppe Sinigaglia; Attendance: 10,817; Referee: Francesco Fourneau

8 March 2026 28	Lecce	2–1	Cremonese	Lecce
12:30 CET (UTC+1)	Pierotti 22'; Štulić 38' (pen.); Siebert (yellow card) 45+4'	Report	Bianchetti (yellow card) 44'; Bonazzoli 47'; Djuric (yellow card) 53'; Luperto (yellow card) 90+6'; Zerbin (yellow card) 90+6'; Pezzella (red card) 90+8'	Stadium: Stadio Via del mare Attendance: 27,705; Referee: Simone Sozza

14 March 2026 29	Napoli	2–1	Lecce	Naples
18:00 CET (UTC+1)	Højlund 46'; Politano 67'	Report	Siebert 3', (yellow card) 19'	Stadium: Stadio Diego Armando Maradona; Attendance: 50,000; Referee: Rosario Abisso

22 March 2026 30	Roma	1–0	Lecce	Rome
18:00 CET (UTC+1)	Vaz 57'; Angeliño (yellow card) 77'; Pisilli (yellow card) 89'	Report	Pierotti (yellow card) 81'; Veiga (yellow card) 90'	Stadium: Stadio Olimpico; Attendance: 62,432; Referee: Juan Luca Sacchi

6 April 2026 31	Lecce	0–3	Atalanta	Lecce
15:00 CEST (UTC+2)		Report	Scalvini 29'; Djimsiti (yellow card) 47'; Krstović 59'; Zappacosta (yellow card) 70'; Raspadori 73'	Stadium: Stadio Via del mare Attendance: 24,884; Referee: Federico La Penna

12 April 2026 32	Bologna	2–0	Lecce	Bologna
18:00 CEST (UTC+2)	Freuler 26'; Orsolini 90+2'	Report	Ngom (yellow card) 36'; Siebert (yellow card) 38'	Stadium: Stadio Renato Dall'Ara; Attendance: 26,141; Referee: Andrea Colombo

20 April 2026 33	Lecce	1–1	Fiorentina	Lecce
20:45 CEST (UTC+2)	Pierotti (yellow card) 62'; Gabriel 71', (yellow card) 72'	Report	Harrison 30'; Pongračić (yellow card) 76'; Fazzini (yellow card) 82'; Solomon (yellow card) 90+1'	Stadium: Stadio Via del mare Attendance: 26,366; Referee: Fabio Maresca

25 April 2026 34	Hellas Verona	0–0	Lecce	Verona
20:45 CEST (UTC+2)	Akpro (yellow card) 52'; Valentini (yellow card) 82'	Report	Coulibaly (yellow card) 12'; Ramadani (yellow card) 67'; Cheddira (yellow card) 86'; N'Dri (yellow card) 90+3'; Veiga (yellow card) 90+7'	Stadium: Stadio Marcantonio Bentegodi; Attendance: 19,407; Referee: Davide Massa

1 May 2026 35	Pisa	1–2	Lecce	Pisa
20:45 CEST (UTC+2)	Caracciolo (yellow card) 43'; Léris 56'; Aebischer (yellow card) 61'; Durosinmi (yellow card) 82'; Meister (yellow card) 90'	Report	Banda 52'; Cheddira 65', (yellow card) 67'; Pierotti (yellow card) 89'	Stadium: Arena Garibaldi; Attendance: 10,372; Referee: Daniele Doveri

9 May 2026 36	Lecce	0–1	Juventus	Lecce
20:45 CEST (UTC+2)	Jean (yellow card) 82'	Report	Vlahović 1'; Conceição (yellow card) 80'	Stadium: Stadio Via del mare Attendance: 27,383; Referee: Andrea Colombo

17 May 2026 37	Sassuolo	2–3	Lecce	Reggio Emilia
20:45 CEST (UTC+2)	Laurienté 20'; Muharemović (yellow card) 77'; Pinamonti 82'	Report	Cheddira 14', 25'; Ramadani (yellow card) 54'; Veiga (yellow card) 81'; Gabriel (yellow card) 85'; Gallo (yellow card) 90+1'; Štulić 90+6'	Stadium: Mapei Stadium; Attendance: 15,186; Referee: Federico La Penna

24 May 2026 38	Lecce	1–0	Genoa	Lecce
20:45 CEST (UTC+2)	Banda 6'; Ramadani (yellow card) 45'; Gabriel (yellow card) 76'	Report		Stadium: Stadio Via del mare Attendance: 27,825; Referee: Daniele Doveri

=== Coppa Italia ===
15 August 2025 First Round	Lecce	2–0	Juve Stabia	Lecce
20:45 CEST (UTC+2)	Krstović 27' (pen.); Banda (red card) 45'; Kaba 90+4'	Report		Stadium: Stadio Via del mare Attendance: 10,667; Referee: Giuseppe Mucera

23 September 2025 Second Round	Milan	3–0	Lecce	Milan
21:00 CEST (UTC+2)	Giménez 20'; Ricci (yellow card) 35'; Nkunku 51'; Pulisic 64'; Pavlović (yellow card) 70'	Report	Siebert (red card) 18'; Kaba (yellow card) 43'	Stadium: San Siro; Attendance: 54,418; Referee: Paride Tremolada
