= 2024–25 US Lecce season =

Lecce
2024–25 season
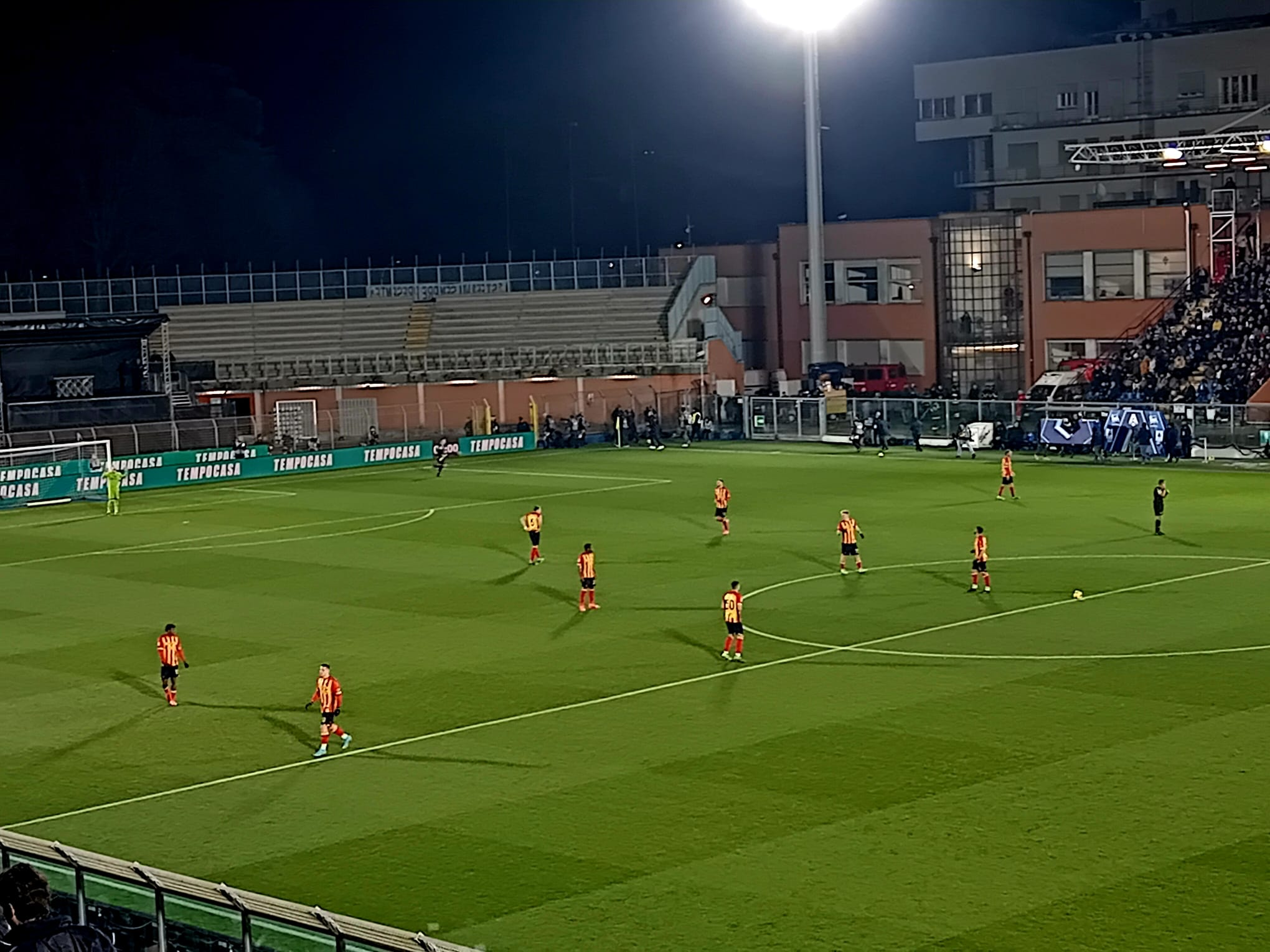
- Lecce team on the pitch for the game against Como (2024–25 season, 30 December 2024)
- Owner: Saverio Sticchi Damiani
- President: Saverio Sticchi Damiani
- Head Coach: Luca Gotti (until 9 November); Marco Giampaolo (from 11 November)
- Stadium: Stadio Via del mare
- Serie A: 16th
- Coppa Italia: Second round
- Top goalscorer: League: Nikola Krstović (7); All: Nikola Krstović (8)
- Highest home attendance: 28,719 vs Atalanta; 19 August 2024 (Serie A)
- Lowest home attendance: 13,951 vs Sassuolo; 24 September 2024 (Coppa Italia)
- Average home league attendance: 25,645
- Biggest win: 1–3 vs Parma (A); 31 January 2025 (Serie A); 1–3 vs Empoli (A); 11 January 2025 (Serie A)
- Biggest defeat: 0–6 vs Fiorentina (H); 20 October 2024 (Serie A)
Home colours	Away colours	Third colours
- All statistics correct as of 15 March 2025.

The 2024–25 season is the 117th season in the history of the US Lecce, and it will also be the third consecutive season in Serie A. In addition to the domestic league, the team is scheduled to participate in the Coppa Italia.

== Squad ==
Note: Flags indicate national team as defined under FIFA eligibility rules; some limited exceptions apply. Players may hold more than one non-FIFA nationality.

No.	Pos.	Nation	Player
1	GK	GER	Christian Früchtl
3	FW	CRO	Ante Rebić
4	DF	ANG	Kialonda Gaspar
5	MF	ALB	Medon Berisha
6	DF	ITA	Federico Baschirotto (vice-captain)
7	FW	ESP	Tete Morente
8	MF	TUN	Hamza Rafia
9	FW	MNE	Nikola Krstović
10	FW	CIV	Konan N’Dri
11	FW	ITA	Nicola Sansone
12	DF	FRA	Frédéric Guilbert
14	MF	ISL	Þórir Jóhann Helgason
16	MF	ESP	Joan González
17	DF	POR	Danilo Veiga
19	DF	FRA	Gaby Jean

No.	Pos.	Nation	Player
20	MF	ALB	Ylber Ramadani (3rd captain)
22	FW	ZAM	Lameck Banda
23	FW	ROU	Rareș Burnete
25	DF	ITA	Antonino Gallo
29	MF	MLI	Lassana Coulibaly
30	GK	ITA	Wladimiro Falcone
31	FW	SWE	Joel Voelkerling Persson
32	GK	FIN	Jasper Samooja
36	MF	POL	Filip Marchwiński
37	FW	SWE	Jesper Karlsson (on loan from Bologna)
44	DF	POR	Tiago Gabriel
50	FW	ARG	Santiago Pierotti
75	MF	FRA	Balthazar Pierret
77	MF	FRA	Mohamed Kaba
99	DF	ITA	Marco Sala (on loan from Como)

== Transfers ==
=== Summer window ===
==== In ====
Date	Pos.	Player	From	Fee	Notes	Ref.
30 June 2024	MF	(Iceland) Þórir Jóhann Helgason	(Germany) Eintracht Braunschweig	End of loan		
1 July 2024	GK	(Germany) Christian Früchtl	Austria Vienna	€1,000,000		
1 July 2024	DF	(Angola) Kialonda Gaspar	(Portugal) Estrela Amadora	€2,000,000		
1 July 2024	FW	(Spain) Tete Morente	(Spain) Elche	Free		
1 July 2024	MF	(France) Balthazar Pierret	(France) Quevilly-Rouen	Free		
26 July 2024	MF	(Poland) Filip Marchwinski	(Poland) Lech Poznań	€3,000,000		
14 August 2024	MF	(Mali) Lassana Coulibaly	(Italy) Salernitana	€1,800,000		
26 August 2024	DF	(France) Gaby Jean	(France) Annecy	€1,000,000		
26 August 2024	FW	(Croatia) Ante Rebić	(Turkey) Beşiktaş	Free		
27 August 2024	DF	(France) Frédéric Guilbert	(France) Strasbourg	Free		
30 August 2024	FW	(Italy) Luis Hasa	(Italy) Juventus Next Gen	Free		

==== Loans in ====
Date	Pos.	Player	From	Fee	Notes	Ref.
11 August 2024	DF	(France) Andy Pelmard	(France) Clermont	Free	Option to buy for €2,000,000	
30 August 2024	DF	(Italy) Kevin Bonifazi	(Italy) Bologna	Free	Option to buy for €500,000	

==== Out ====
Date	Pos.	Player	To	Fee	Notes	Ref.
30 June 2024	FW	(Sweden) Pontus Almqvist	(Russia) Rostov	End of loan		
30 June 2024	FW	(Italy) Roberto Piccoli	(Italy) Atalanta	End of loan		
30 June 2024	DF	(Algeria) Ahmed Touba	(Turkey) İstanbul Başakşehir	End of loan		
1 July 2024	DF	(Albania) Kastriot Dermaku	Unattached	Free	End of contract	
1 July 2024	FW	(Brazil) Gabriel Strefezza	(Italy) Como	€3,500,000		
18 July 2024	DF	(Italy) Lorenzo Venuti	(Italy) Sampdoria	Undisclosed		
18 July 2024	GK	(Italy) Antonino Viola	(Italy) Team Altamura	Undisclosed		
19 July 2024	DF	(Croatia) Marin Pongračić	(Italy) Fiorentina	€15,000,000		
25 July 2024	MF	(France) Alexis Blin	(Italy) Palermo	€1,500,000		
7 August 2024	GK	(Italy) Federico Brancolini	(Italy) Empoli	Free		
20 August 2024	MF	(Poland) Marcin Listkowski	(Poland) Jagiellonia Białystok	Undisclosed		
26 August 2024	DF	(Sweden) Zinedin Smajlovic	(Sweden) Sandviken	Free	Contract solved by mutual consent	
27 August 2024	DF	(France) Valentin Gendrey	(Germany) Hoffenheim	€8,500,000		

==== Loans out ====
Date	Pos.	Player	To	Fee	Notes	Ref.
2 August 2024	FW	(Spain) Pablo Rodríguez	(Spain) Racing Santander	Free		
17 August 2024	FW	(Sweden) Joel Voelkerling Persson	(Sweden) Värnamo	Free	Option to buy for an undisclosed fee	
21 August 2024	FW	(Finland) Henri Salomaa	(Italy) Casertana	Free		
30 August 2024	MF	(Italy) Giacomo Faticanti	(Italy) Juventus Next Gen	Free	Option to buy for an undisclosed fee	
3 September 2024	DF	(Belgium) Mats Lemmens	(Belgium) Lokeren	Free		

=== Winter window ===
==== In ====
Date	Pos.	Player	From	Fee	Notes	Ref.
31 December 2024	FW	(Finland) Eetu Mömmö	(Finland) SJK Seinäjoki	End of loan		
31 December 2024	FW	(Sweden) Joel Voelkerling Persson	(Sweden) Värnamo	End of loan		
28 January 2025	DF	(Portugal) Tiago Gabriel	(Portugal) Estrela Amadora	€1,250,000		
28 January 2025	DF	(Portugal) Danilo Veiga	(Portugal) Estrela Amadora	€1,000,000		
29 January 2025	FW	(Finland) Henri Salomaa	(Italy) Casertana	Free	Loan terminated early	
1 February 2025	DF	(Germany) Elijah Scott	(Germany) Stuttgart	€800,000		
2 February 2025	DF	(Italy) Kevin Bonifazi	(Italy) Bologna	€500,000		
2 February 2025	DF	(Belgium) Mats Lemmens	(Belgium) Lokeren	Free	Loan terminated early	
2 February 2025	FW	(Ivory Coast) Konan N'Dri	(Belgium) OH Leuven	€1,500,000		

==== Loans in ====
Date	Pos.	Player	From	Fee	Notes	Ref.
4 January 2025	FW	(Sweden) Jesper Karlsson	(Italy) Bologna	Free		
3 February 2025	DF	(Italy) Marco Sala	(Italy) Como	Free	Option to buy for an undisclosed fee	

==== Out ====
Date	Pos.	Player	To	Fee	Notes	Ref.
2 January 2025	DF	(Denmark) Patrick Dorgu	(England) Manchester United	€30,000,000		
8 January 2025	DF	(Italy) Luis Hasa	(Italy) Napoli	€500,000		
15 January 2025	FW	(Albania) Dario Daka	(Italy) Trapani	Free		
19 January 2025	DF	(France) Andy Pelmard	(France) Clermont	Free	Loan terminated early	

==== Loans out ====
Date	Pos.	Player	To	Fee	Notes	Ref.
24 January 2025	MF	(France) Rémi Oudin	(Italy) Sampdoria	Free	Option to buy for an undisclosed fee	
28 January 2025	MF	(Republic of Ireland) Ed McJannet	(Italy) Audace Cerignola	Free		
30 January 2025	FW	(Finland) Henri Salomaa	(Italy) Lucchese	Free		
3 February 2025	DF	(Italy) Kevin Bonifazi	(Italy) Sassuolo	Free		
3 February 2025	DF	(Belgium) Mats Lemmens	(Belgium) RWD Molenbeek	Free	Option to buy for an undisclosed fee	
4 February 2025	GK	(Romania) Alexandru Borbei	(Romania) CFR Cluj	Free	Option to buy for an undisclosed fee	
19 February 2025	FW	(Finland) Eetu Mömmö	(Finland) Haka	Free		

== Friendlies ==
=== Pre-season ===
20 July 2024 Friendly	Werder Bremen (Germany)	0–3	(Italy) Lecce	Zell am Ziller, Austria
15:00 UTC+2			Krstović 31', 34'; Rafia 87'	Stadium: Parkstadion

21 July 2024 Friendly	NK Slaven Belupo (Croatia)	v	(Italy) Lecce	Croatia

24 July 2024 Friendly	Galatasaray (Turkey)	2–1	(Italy) Lecce	Linz, Austria
19:30				Stadium: Raiffeisen Arena

28 July 2024 Friendly	Huddersfield Town (England)	2–1	(Italy) Lecce	Jenbach, Austria
12:00		Report		Stadium: Stadion Jenbach

4 August 2024 Friendly	Lecce (Italy)	2–3	(France) Nice	Lecce, Italy
17:00 CEST (UTC+2)	Pierotti (yellow card) 57'; Marchwiński 70', 74'	Report	Guessand 15'; Clauss 49'; Rosario (yellow card) 57'; Mendy (yellow card) 67'; Bouanani 89'	Stadium: Stadio Via del mare Attendance: 4,261; Referee: Leonardo Mastrodomenico

13 August 2024 Friendly	Lecce (Italy)	0–0	(Italy) Monopoli	San Pietro in Lama
11:30		Report		Stadium: DEGHI Sport Center

== Competitions ==
=== Overall record ===
Competition	First match	Last match	Starting round	Final position	Record							
Competition	First match	Last match	Starting round	Final position	Pld	W	D	L	GF	GA	GD	Win %
Serie A	19 August 2024	24–25 May 2025	Matchday 1		32	6	8	18	23	52	−29	18.75
Coppa Italia	8 April 2025	24 September 2024	First round	Second round	2	1	0	1	2	3	−1	50.00
Total					34	7	8	19	25	55	−30	20.59

Last updated: 15 April 2025
Source: Soccerway

=== Serie A ===
==== League table ====
Pos	Team	Pld	W	D	L	GF	GA	GD	Pts	Qualification or relegation
15	Cagliari	38	9	9	20	40	56	−16	36 (Note: Cagliari finished ahead of Parma on head-to-head points: Parma 2–3 Cagliari, Cagliari 2–1 Parma.)	
16	Parma	38	7	15	16	44	58	−14	36	
17	Lecce	38	8	10	20	27	58	−31	34	
18	Empoli (R)	38	6	13	19	33	59	−26	31	Relegation to Serie B
19	Venezia (R)	38	5	14	19	32	56	−24	29	Relegation to Serie B

Source: Serie A
Rules for classification: 1) Points; 2) Tiebreaker for Champions team and third relegated team; 3) Head-to-head points; 4) Head-to-head goal difference; 5) Goal difference; 6) Goals scored; 7) Draw.
(Note: Head-to-head record is used only after all the matches between the teams in question have been played)
(R) Relegated

==== Results summary ====
Overall								Home						Away					
Pld	W	D	L	GF	GA	GD	Pts	W	D	L	GF	GA	GD	W	D	L	GF	GA	GD
32	6	8	18	23	52	−29	26	3	6	7	12	27	−15	3	2	11	11	25	−14

Last updated: 15 April 2025.
Source: Worldfootball

==== Results by round ====
Round	1	2	3	4	5	6	7	8	9	10	11	12	13	14	15	16	17	18	19	20	21	22	23	24	25	26	27	28	29	30	31	32	33	34	35
Ground	H	A	H	A	H	A	A	H	A	H	A	H	A	H	A	H	H	A	H	A	A	H	A	H	A	H	A	H	A	H	H	A	H	H	
Result	L	L	W	D	D	L	L	L	L	W	L	D	W	D	L	W	L	L	D	W	L	L	W	D	D	L	L	L	L	L	D	L			
Position	20	20	13	13	17	18	17	19	20	19	20	18	15	16	16	14	14	17	17	13	15	16	13	14	15	16	16	16	16	17	17	17			

Updated to match(es) played on 15 April 2025. Source: Worldfootball
A = Away; H = Home; W = Win; D = Draw; L = Loss

==== Matches ====
The match schedule was released on 4 July 2024.

19 August 2024 1	Lecce	0–4	Atalanta	Lecce
18:30 CEST (UTC+2)		Report	Brescianini 35', 66'; Retegui 45', 57' (pen.); de Roon (yellow card) 60'; Éderson (yellow card) 80'	Stadium: Stadio Via del mare Attendance: 28,719; Referee: Federico Dionisi

24 August 2024 2	Internazionale	2–0	Lecce	Milan
20:45 CEST (UTC+2)	Darmian 5'; Çalhanoğlu 70' (pen.)	Report	Gallo (yellow card) 31'; Banda (yellow card) 60'	Stadium: Stadio Giuseppe Meazza; Attendance: 70,921; Referee: Davide Di Marco

31 August 2024 3	Lecce	1–0	Cagliari	Lecce
18:30 CEST (UTC+2)	Krstović 26'; Dorgu (red card) 45+1'; Falcone (yellow card) 65'	Report	Zappa (yellow card) 24'; Lapadula (yellow card) 48'; Marin (yellow card) 70'	Stadium: Stadio Via del mare Attendance: 26,386; Referee: Michael Fabbri

15 September 2024 4	Torino	0–0	Lecce	Turin
15:00 CEST (UTC+2)	Walukiewicz (yellow card) 83'	Report	Pierret (yellow card) 23'; Morente (yellow card) 45+1'; Rafia (yellow card) 78'	Stadium: Stadio Olimpico Grande Torino; Attendance: 24,277; Referee: Andrea Colombo

21 September 2024 5	Lecce	2–2	Parma	Lecce
20:45 CEST (UTC+2)	Ylber (yellow card) 31'; Dorgu 32', (yellow card) 51'; Guilbert (red card) 47'; Gaspar (yellow card) 54'; Krstović 59'; Rafia (yellow card) 84'	Report	Cancellieri (red card) 58'; Almqvist 90+3'; Hainaut 90+5'	Stadium: Stadio Via del mare Attendance: 25,503; Referee: Marco Guida

27 September 2024 6	Milan	3–0	Lecce	Milan
20:45 CEST (UTC+2)	Morata 38'; Hernández 41'; Pulisic 43'; Bartesaghi (red card) 80'	Report		Stadium: San Siro; Attendance: 71,103; Referee: Luca Zufferli

5 October 2024 7	Udinese	1–0	Lecce	Udine
15:00 CEST (UTC+2)	Ehizibue (yellow card) 28'; Kamara (yellow card) 72'; Zemura 75'	Report	Rebić (yellow card) 36'; Baschirotto (yellow card) 40'	Stadium: Bluenergy Stadium; Attendance: 21,441; Referee: Maurizio Mariani

20 October 2024 8	Lecce	0–6	Fiorentina	Lecce
15:00 CEST (UTC+2)	Gallo (red card) 43'	Report	Colpani (yellow card) 18', (goal) 34', 54'; Cataldi 20', 45'; Adli (yellow card) 42'; Gosens (yellow card) 59'; Beltrán 61'; Parisi 72'; Ranieri (yellow card) 80'; Richardson (yellow card) 85'	Stadium: Stadio Via del mare Attendance: 25,124; Referee: Francesco Fourneau

26 October 2024 9	Napoli	1–0	Lecce	Naples
15:00 CEST (UTC+2)	Ngonge (yellow card) 19'; Di Lorenzo (yellow card) 51', (goal) 73'; Olivera (yellow card) 90'; Stellini (yellow card)	Report	Pierotti (yellow card) 77'; Rebić (yellow card) 90+3'	Stadium: Stadio Diego Armando Maradona; Attendance: 51,103; Referee: Paride Tremolada

29 October 2024 10	Lecce	1–0	Hellas Verona	Lecce
18:30 CEST (UTC+2)	Guilbert (yellow card) 32'; Dorgu 51'	Report	Belahyane (yellow card) 26' (yellow-red card) 82'; Tchatchoua (red card) 40'; Serdar (yellow card) 56'	Stadium: Stadio Via del mare Attendance: 23,698; Referee: Maurizio Mariani

2 November 2024 11	Bologna	1–0	Lecce	Bologna
15:00 CET (UTC+1)	Urbanski (yellow card) 66'; Ndoye (yellow card) 72'; Orsolini 85'	Report	Pelmard (yellow card) 71'; Gaspar (yellow card) 86'	Stadium: Stadio Renato Dall'Ara; Attendance: 25,000; Referee: Giuseppe Collu

8 November 2024 12	Lecce	1–1	Empoli	Lecce
20:45 CEST (UTC+2)	Pierotti 77'	Report	Pellegri 33', (yellow card) 52'; Cacace (yellow card) 45+1'; Henderson (yellow card) 84'	Stadium: Stadio Via del mare Attendance: 23,907; Referee: Juan Luca Sacchi

25 November 2024 13	Venezia	0–1	Lecce	Venice
20:45 CET (UTC+1)	Yeboah (yellow card) 77'	Report	Rafia (yellow card) 2'; Gaspar (yellow card) 45+1'; Guilbert (yellow card) 64'; Dorgu 70'; Sansone (yellow card) 85'	Stadium: Stadio Pier Luigi Penzo; Attendance: 9,448; Referee: Luca Pairetto

1 December 2024 14	Lecce	1–1	Juventus	Lecce
20:45 CET (UTC+1)	Coulibaly (yellow card) 19'; Rebić 90+3'	Report	Cambiaso (yellow card) 39', (goal) 68'; Danilo (yellow card) 67'; Fagioli (yellow card) 73'; Koopmeiners (yellow card) 82'	Stadium: Stadio Via del mare Attendance: 27,080; Referee: Antonio Rapuano

7 December 2024 15	Roma	4–1	Lecce	Rome
20:45 CET (UTC+1)	Saelemaekers (yellow card) 12', (goal) 13'; Mancini 59'; Pisilli 66'; Koné 86', (yellow card) 87'	Report	Krstović 40' (pen.), (yellow card) 69'; Kaba (yellow card) 72'; Oudin (yellow card) 78'	Stadium: Stadio Olimpico; Attendance: 58,213; Referee: Daniele Chiffi

15 December 2024 16	Lecce	2–1	Monza	Lecce
12:30 CEST (UTC+2)	Morente 3'; Rafia (yellow card) 28'; M.Giampaolo (yellow card) 30'; Krstović 44'	Report	Kyriakopoulos (yellow card) 20'; Dorgu 37' (o.g.); Izzo (yellow card) 40'; Bianco (yellow card) 43'; Maldini (yellow card) 83'; Pereira (yellow card) 90+5'	Stadium: Stadio Via del mare Attendance: 23,663; Referee: Maurizio Mariani

21 December 2024 17	Lecce	1–2	Lazio	Lecce
20:45	Guilbert (red card) 45+1'; Morente 50'; Dorgu (yellow card) 69'; Rebić (yellow card) 71'; Ylber (yellow card) 90'	Report	Castellanos 45+3' (pen.); Tchaouna (yellow card) 82'; Marusic 87'; Gila (yellow card) 90'	Stadium: Stadio Via del mare Attendance: 26,749; Referee: Gianluca Manganiello

30 December 2024 18	Como	2–0	Lecce	Como
18:30	Van Der Brempt (yellow card) 24'; Nico Paz (penalty missed) 31', 49'; Goldaniga (yellow card) 66'; Engelhardt (yellow card) 76'; Cutrone 79'	Report	Coulibaly (yellow card) 56'; Pierotti (yellow card) 66'	Stadium: Stadio Giuseppe Sinigaglia; Attendance: 12,000; Referee: Marco Piccinini

5 January 2025 19	Lecce	0–0	Genoa	Lecce
15:00		Report	Kasa (yellow card) 90+1'	Stadium: Stadio Via del mare Attendance: 26,436; Referee: Livio Marinelli

11 January 2025 20	Empoli	1–3	Lecce	Empoli
15:00	Cacace 47'	Report	Morente 6', (yellow card) 37'; Krstović 11', 90+1', (yellow card) 83'; Pierret (yellow card) 58'	Stadium: Carlo Castellani; Attendance: 9,096; Referee: Daniele Chiffi

19 January 2025 21	Cagliari	4–1	Lecce	Cagliari
15:00	Adopo (yellow card) 52'; Gaetano 60'; Luperto 65'; Zortea 80', (yellow card) 81'; Obert 83'; Deiola (yellow card) 90+1'	Report	Pierotti 42', (yellow card) 45'; Rebić (red card) 73'	Stadium: Unipol Domus; Attendance: 16,306; Referee: Juan Luca Sacchi

26 January 2025 22	Lecce	0–4	Inter	Lecce
18:00		Report	Frattesi 6'; de Vrij (yellow card) 16'; S.Inzaghi (yellow card) 31'; L.Martínez 39'; Dumfries 57'; Taremi 61' (pen.), (yellow card) 82'	Stadium: Stadio Via del mare Attendance: 27,223; Referee: Livio Marinelli

31 January 2025 23	Parma	1–3	Lecce	Parma
20:45	Valeri 34' (pen.); Camara (yellow card) 90'	Report	Ylber (yellow card) 20'; Krstović 36'; Pierotti 63', 90+3'; Karlsson (yellow card) 79'	Stadium: Ennio Tardini; Attendance: 18,238; Referee: Simone Sozza

9 February 2025 24	Lecce	0–0	Bologna	Lecce
18:00		Report	Freuler (yellow card) 61'; Pobega (yellow card) 90+3'	Stadium: Stadio Via del mare Attendance: 24.910; Referee: Francesco Fourneau

16 February 2025 25	Monza	0–0	Lecce	Monza
15:00	Izzo (yellow card) 33'; Pereira (yellow card) 35'	Report	Pierotti (yellow card) 37'; Ylber (yellow card) 74'	Stadium: Stadio Brianteo; Attendance: 11,050; Referee: Giuseppe Collu

21 February 2025 26	Lecce	0–1	Udinese	Lecce
20:45	Berisha (yellow card) 65'	Report	Lucca (yellow card) 31', (goal) 32' (pen.); Lovrič (yellow card) 66'; Payero (yellow card) 67'	Stadium: Stadio Via del mare Attendance: 23,989; Referee: Kevin Bonacina

28 February 2025 27	Fiorentina	1–0	Lecce	Florence
20:45	Gosens 9'; Beltrán (yellow card) 17', (penalty missed) 73'; Zaniolo (yellow card) 61'; Mandragora (yellow card) 86'	Report	Berisha (yellow card) 45+2'; Gallo (yellow card) 51'	Stadium: Artemio Franchi; Attendance: 17,383; Referee: Livio Marinelli

8 March 2025 28	Lecce	2–3	Milan	Lecce
18:00	Krstović 7', 59', (yellow card) 90+1'; Berisha (yellow card) 42'	Report	Gallo 68' (o.g.); Pulišić 73' (pen.), 81'; Abraham (yellow card) 88'	Stadium: Stadio Via del mare Attendance: 25,753; Referee: Daniele Doveri

14 March 2025 29	Genoa	2–1	Lecce	Genoa
20:45	Miretti 16', 45+2', (yellow card) 34'; Martín (yellow card) 29'; Vásquez (yellow card) 89'	Report	Berisha (yellow card) 49'; Krstović 68' (pen.), (yellow card) 68'	Stadium: Luigi Ferraris; Attendance: 31,495; Referee: Fabio Maresca

29 March 2025 30	Lecce	0–1	Roma	Lecce
20:45	Karlsson (yellow card) 54'	Report	Baldanzi (yellow card) 75'; Saelemaekers (yellow card) 78'; Dovbyk 80'; C.Ranieri (yellow card) 90'	Stadium: Stadio Via del mare Attendance: 27,207; Referee: Gianluca Manganiello

6 April 2025 31	Lecce	1–1	Venezia	Lecce
12:30 CET (UTC+1)	Baschirotto (yellow card) 64', (goal) 65'; Guilbert (yellow card) 61'	Report	Carboni (yellow card) 39'; Gallo 50' (o.g.); Marcandalli (yellow card) 55'; Pérez (yellow card) 64'; Candé (yellow card) 83'	Stadium: Via del Mare; Attendance: 25,709; Referee: Marco Piccinini

12 April 2025 32	Juventus	2–1	Lecce	Turin
20:45	Koopmeiners 2'; Yıldız 33'	Report	Morente (yellow card) 52'; Baschirotto 87'	Stadium: Allianz Stadium; Attendance: 39,087; Referee: Luca Zufferli

=== Coppa Italia ===
12 August 2024 First round	Lecce	2–1	Mantova	Lecce
18:30	Gaspar 14'; Krstović 86'	Report	Solini (yellow card) 29'; Fiori (yellow card) 50'; Bragantini 73'	Stadium: Stadio Via del mare Attendance: 11,424; Referee: Mario Perri

24 September 2024 Second round	Lecce	0–2	Sassuolo	Lecce
16:00		Report	Muharemović 13'; Volpato (yellow card) 19'; Josh Doig (yellow card) 54'; Lipani (yellow card) 64'; D'Andrea 79', (yellow card) 80'	Stadium: Stadio Via del mare Attendance: 13,951; Referee: Daniele Perenzoni
