= Tiago Gabriel =

Portuguese footballer

Personal information
- Full name: Tiago Gabriel Coelho Oliveira
- Date of birth: 26 December 2004 (age 21)
- Place of birth: Cascais, Portugal
- Height: 1.94 m (6 ft 4 in)
- Position: Centre-back

Team information
- Current team: Lecce
- Number: 44

Youth career
- 2017–2020: Sporting CP
- 2020–2023: Vitória Setúbal

Senior career*
Years	Team	Apps	(Gls)
2023–2025	Estrela da Amadora	11	(1)
2025–	Lecce	43	(4)

International career^{‡}
2025–	Portugal U21	4	(0)
- * Club domestic league appearances and goals as of 15:04, 13 September 2026 (UTC) ‡ National team caps and goals as of 01:18, 30 November 2025 (UTC)

Tiago Gabriel Coelho Oliveira (born 26 December 2004), known as Tiago Gabriel, is a Portuguese professional footballer who plays as a centre-back for Serie A club Lecce and the Portugal national under-21 team.

== Club career ==
=== Estrela Amadora ===
Born in Cascais in the Lisbon District, Tiago Gabriel played for Sporting CP up to under-17 level, when he joined Vitória de Setúbal. He moved from under-19 at that club to under-23 at Estrela da Amadora.

After 46 games and 5 goals in the under-23 and reserve teams of Estrela, Tiago Gabriel was promoted to the first team in August 2024 by manager Filipe Martins, due to a scarcity of defenders at the club. He played 11 Primeira Liga games for the club, scoring the only goal on 23 December of a home win over Rio Ave, taking the Amadora-based side up to 12th place.

=== Lecce ===
In late January 2025, Tiago Gabriel and fellow Estrela defender Danilo Veiga transferred to Lecce in Serie A, after Kialonda Gaspar had joined the Italian club at the start of the season. The transfer fee was reported in Portugal as €4 million between the two players, and in Italy as €2 million for Veiga and €1 million for Tiago Gabriel.

Tiago Gabriel made his debut for Lecce on 12 April in a 2–1 loss away to Juventus. He came on in the 11th minute as a substitute for the injured Gaby Jean. His only other appearance of a season in which his team finished 17th was on 11 May, replacing Kialonda Gaspar for the final minutes of a 1–1 draw away to Hellas Verona.

== International career ==
In late August 2025, Tiago Gabriel had his first international call-up, by incoming Portugal under-21 manager Luís Freire. He made his debut on 5 September in a 5–0 home win over Azerbaijan in Barcelos, in 2027 UEFA European Under-21 Championship qualification.

== Career statistics ==
=== Club ===
As of match played 13 September 2026

Appearances and goals by club, season and competition
Club	Season	League			Cup		Europe		Total	
Club	Season	Division	Apps	Goals	Apps	Goals	Apps	Goals	Apps	Goals
Estrela da Amadora	2024–25	Primeira Liga	11	1	—		—		11	1
Lecce	2024–25	Serie A	2	0	—		—		2	0
Lecce	2025–26	Serie A	37	2	2	0	—		39	2
Lecce	2026–27	Serie A	4	2	1	0	—		5	2
Lecce	Total		43	4	3	0	0	0	46	4
Career total			54	5	3	0	0	0	57	5
