= Medon Berisha =

Albanian footballer (born 2003)

Personal information
- Date of birth: 21 October 2003 (age 23)
- Place of birth: Münsingen, Switzerland
- Height: 1.86 m (6 ft 1 in)
- Position: Central midfielder

Team information
- Current team: Lecce
- Number: 10

Youth career
- 2008–2015: Bern 1894
- 2015–2022: Young Boys
- 2022–2023: Lecce

Senior career*
Years	Team	Apps	(Gls)
2021–2022	Young Boys II	16	(1)
2023–	Lecce	36	(2)

International career^{‡}
2021	Albania U19	2	(0)
2022	Albania U20	2	(0)
2022	Kosovo U21	2	(0)
2022–2024	Albania U21	12	(3)
2024–	Albania	4	(0)
- * Club domestic league appearances and goals as of 30 November 2025 ‡ National team caps and goals as of 4 September 2025

Medon Berisha (mɛˈdɔn bəˈɾiʃa; born 21 October 2003) is a professional footballer who plays as a central midfielder for Serie A club Lecce. Born in Switzerland, he represented Albania at youth level and the Kosovo under-21 team before switching back to Albania, whom he represents at senior international level.

Berisha began his career in Switzerland with Bern 1894 before joining Young Boys. He moved to Italian club Lecce in 2022, where he helped the Primavera team win the Campionato Primavera 1 title in the 2022–23 season. He subsequently progressed to the first team and established himself as a regular in the club's Serie A side in 2025.

At international level, Berisha initially represented Albania at under-19 level before playing for Kosovo at under-21 level. After obtaining Albanian citizenship, he returned to represent Albania and captained the under-21 team during 2025 UEFA European Under-21 Championship qualification. He made his senior debut in 2024 and was selected for UEFA Euro 2024, becoming Albania's youngest player to appear at a European Championship, aged 20 years, 8 months and 3 days.

== Club career ==
=== Early career ===
Berisha was born in Münsingen, Switzerland, to Kosovar Albanian parents from Kaçanik. He began playing football at the age of five with Bern 1894, where he remained until the age of 15.

He then joined the youth academy of Young Boys in Bern, progressing through the under-17, under-18 and under-19 teams. During the 2019–20 season, he made eight appearances and scored once for the under-17 team before progressing to the under-18 side, for whom he scored 14 goals in 28 appearances in the 2020–21 season. He was also part of the Young Boys under-18 team that won the Swiss championship in 2021, appearing as a substitute in the final against Team Ticino. In September 2021, he made his debut for Young Boys' under-21 team in the Promotion League, scoring once during the season. He also made six appearances in the 2021–22 UEFA Youth League for Young Boys, scoring once and providing an assist, including a free-kick goal in a 3–2 defeat to Atalanta on 23 November 2021.

=== Lecce ===
In February 2022, Berisha joined the youth academy of Italian club Lecce, initially featuring for its Primavera team in the 2021–22 Campionato Primavera 1 season, making 13 appearances and scoring twice.

He was promoted to the first team ahead of the 2022–23 season, being included in the squad for the Coppa Italia match against Cittadella and the Serie A fixture against Inter in August 2022, remaining an unused substitute in both matches. During the 2022–23 Campionato Primavera 1 season, he made 34 league appearances and scored 10 goals, helping Lecce win the championship after defeating Fiorentina 1–0 in the final on 9 June 2023. He also made three appearances in the 2022–23 Coppa Italia Primavera, scoring once.

In the 2023–24 season, Berisha became a regular member of Lecce's first-team matchday squads in both Serie A and the 2023–24 Coppa Italia. He made his senior debut on 1 November 2023, starting in a 4–2 Coppa Italia Second round defeat to Parma in which he played the full 90-minutes. He made his Serie A debut on 25 February 2024, coming on as a substitute in a 4–0 defeat to Inter. He made five further league appearances, starting Lecce's final two fixtures against Atalanta and Napoli, and finished the season with six Serie A appearances. His increased involvement followed praise from manager Luca Gotti, who said in March that Berisha had impressed him and later stated that the midfielder's opportunities were earned on merit rather than being experimental; local coverage also reported that he had gained the coach's confidence in training. His performances during the season were followed by his inclusion in Albania's squad for UEFA Euro 2024 by manager Sylvinho.

In the 2024–25 season, Berisha had increasing playing time, making 17 appearances in Serie A, seven as a starter, providing one assist, and also featured once in the Coppa Italia. His progress was interrupted by two muscular injuries: a thigh injury sustained in September kept him out for nearly two months, while a further muscular problem in December sidelined him until February. On 18 October 2024 Berisha signed a contract extension until 30 June 2028. In its season review, SalentoSport praised his technical ability and vision, while noting that the injuries had limited his contribution.

In the 2025–26 season, Berisha established himself as an important member of Lecce's first team under manager Eusebio Di Francesco, making 13 appearances in Serie A, 12 as a starter, and recording two goals and three assists. He provided an assist for Francesco Camarda's stoppage-time equaliser in a 2–2 draw against Bologna on 28 September 2025, before scoring with a free kick in a 3–2 defeat to Udinese on 25 October. On 2 November, he scored the only goal in a 1–0 away win over Fiorentina, earning praise as the match's best player from Sky Sport. He then provided both assists in Lecce's 2–1 victory over Torino on 30 November, setting up goals for Lassana Coulibaly and Lameck Banda. His performances earned him an average rating of 6.25 in SalentoSport's end-of-season player assessments, the second-highest among Lecce players. His season was cut short by two injuries: he suffered a thigh injury during a match against Pisa on 12 December 2025, before sustaining a further injury to the tendon of his right rectus femoris during individual training in March 2026, ruling him out for the remainder of the campaign. On 27 March 2026, Berisha underwent successful surgery on the injury in Turku, Finland, performed by professor Lasse Lempainen, and began rehabilitation with the aim of returning to full fitness for the following season.

In the 2026–27 season, Berisha returned to first-team training on 11 November 2026 after nearly a year out with injury. He was included in Lecce's matchday squad for the first time since his return to training for the 3–0 defeat to Lazio on 21 November, but remained an unused substitute.

== International career ==
Berisha was initially called up to the Albania under-19 squad but, due to bureaucratic issues in obtaining his Albanian passport, he represented the Kosovo under-21 team instead. He was subsequently called up to the Albania under-20 team by coach Alban Bushi in September 2022. After receiving Albanian citizenship in August 2023, he went on to represent Albania at under-21 level, captaining the side during qualification for the 2025 UEFA European Under-21 Championship and scoring twice in the campaign.

On 27 May 2024, Berisha received his first call-up to the senior national team from coach Sylvinho for the preliminary UEFA Euro 2024 squad. He made his senior debut on 3 June in a 3–0 friendly win over Liechtenstein, coming on as a 74th-minute substitute. He was subsequently included in Albania's final squad for the tournament and made his competitive debut in the final group-stage match against Spain on 24 June, coming on as a second-half substitute. Aged 20 years, eight months and three days, he became Albania's youngest player to appear at a UEFA European Championship, breaking the record set by Mario Mitaj earlier in the tournament.

Following Euro 2024, Berisha continued to be called up and made occasional appearances in international competitions and friendly matches.

== Style of play ==
Berisha's natural position is central midfielder but he can also play as a left winger and is known for his passing ability.

== Personal life ==
Berisha is of Albanian descent and has roots in Kosovo. He acquired Albanian citizenship in August 2023. He has stated that he grew up supporting FC Barcelona and admires Lionel Messi.

== Career statistics ==
=== Club ===
As of match played 21 November 2026

Appearances and goals by club, season and competition
Club	Season	League			Cup		Europe		Other		Total	
Club	Season	Division	Apps	Goals	Apps	Goals	Apps	Goals	Apps	Goals	Apps	Goals
Young Boys U-21	2021–22	Promotion League	16	1	—		—		—		16	1
Lecce	2022–23	Serie A	0	0	0	0	—		—		0	0
Lecce	2023–24	Serie A	6	0	1	0	—		—		7	0
Lecce	2024–25	Serie A	17	0	1	0	—		—		18	0
Lecce	2025–26	Serie A	13	2	1	0	—		—		14	2
Lecce	2026–27	Serie A	0	0	—		—		—		0	0
Lecce	Total		36	2	3	0	—		—		39	2
Career total			48	3	2	0	0	0	0	0	50	3

=== International ===
As of match played 4 September 2025

Appearances and goals by national team and year
National team	Year	Apps	Goals
Albania	2024	3	0
Albania	2025	1	0
Total		4	0

== Honours ==
Lecce Primavera

- Campionato Primavera 1: 2022–23
