= Ed McJannet =

Irish footballer (born 2004)

Personal information
- Full name: Edward John McJannet
- Date of birth: 25 January 2004 (age 22)
- Place of birth: St Albans, England
- Height: 1.83 m (6 ft 0 in)
- Position: Midfielder

Team information
- Current team: Cosenza (on loan from Lecce)
- Number: 7

Youth career
- –2023: Luton Town
- 2023–2024: Lecce

Senior career*
Years	Team	Apps	(Gls)
2021–2022	Luton Town	0	(0)
2024–	Lecce	0	(0)
2025	→ Audace Cerignola (loan)	12	(0)
2025–2026	→ Ternana (loan)	26	(0)
2026–	→ Cosenza (loan)	0	(0)

International career^{‡}
2021	Republic of Ireland U18	2	(0)
2021–2023	Republic of Ireland U19	13	(0)
2023–2025	Republic of Ireland U21	6	(0)
- * Club domestic league appearances and goals as of 23:49, 28 July 2026 ‡ National team caps and goals as of 00:25, 18 November 2026

Edward John McJannet (born 25 January 2004) is an Irish footballer who plays as a midfielder for Serie C Group C club Cosenza, on loan from Lecce. Born in England, he is a Republic of Ireland youth international.

== Club career ==
McJannet joined the youth academy of English side Luton at the age of nine.

On 31 January 2023, McJannet joined the Under-19 squad of the Italian club Lecce. For the 2024–25 Serie A season, he was promoted to the senior squad.

On 28 January 2025, McJannet signed for Serie C club Audace Cerignola on loan until the end of the season. On 23 July 2025, McJannet moved on a new Serie C loan to Ternana.

On 28 July 2026, McJannet joined Serie C club Cosenza on a season-long-loan.

== International career ==
McJannet has captained the Republic of Ireland national under-19 football team.

== Style of play ==
McJannet mainly operates as a midfielder.

== Personal life ==
McJannet has an Irish grandmother.

== Career statistics ==
=== Club ===
As of match played 1 February 2026

Appearances and goals by club, season and competition
Club	Season	League			National Cup (Note: Includes FA Cup & Coppa Italia)		League Cup (Note: Includes EFL Cup & Coppa Italia Serie C)		Other		Total	
Club	Season	Division	Apps	Goals	Apps	Goals	Apps	Goals	Apps	Goals	Apps	Goals
Luton Town	2021–22	Championship	0	0	0	0	0	0	0	0	0	0
Lecce	2024–25	Serie A	0	0	0	0	—		—		0	0
Lecce	2025–26	Serie A	0	0	—		—		—		0	0
Lecce	Total		0	0	0	0	—		—		0	0
Audace Cerignola (loan)	2024–25	Serie C	12	0	—		—		3 (Note: Appearances in the Serie C Promotion Playoffs)	0	15	0
Ternana (loan)	2025–26	Serie C	12	0	1	0	5	1	—		18	1
Cosenza (loan)	2026–27	Serie C	0	0	0	0	0	0	—		0	0
Career total			24	0	1	0	5	1	3	0	33	1
