= Santiago Pierotti =

Argentine footballer (born 2001)

Personal information
- Full name: Santiago Daniel Pierotti
- Date of birth: 3 April 2001 (age 25)
- Place of birth: Pilar, Argentina
- Height: 1.88 m (6 ft 2 in)
- Positions: Winger; forward

Team information
- Current team: Lecce
- Number: 50

Youth career
- 2014–2019: Colón

Senior career*
Years	Team	Apps	(Gls)
2019–2023	Colón	101	(7)
2024–	Lecce	84	(5)
- * Club domestic league appearances and goals as of 25 May 2026

Santiago Daniel Pierotti (born 3 April 2001) is an Argentine professional footballer who plays as a winger or forward for Serie A club Lecce.

== Club career ==
Pierotti started his career in Colón's ranks; having signed in 2014. He, aged eighteen, appeared for his professional debut on 12 April 2019 in the Copa de la Superliga against Tigre, replacing Marcelo Estigarribia after eighty-four minutes as the first round, first leg ended 0–0.

On 13 January 2024, it was announced that Serie A club Lecce had reached an agreement with Colón for the permanent transfer of Pierotti, subject to the results of medical tests and international clearance. The deal was made official three days later, as the player signed a contract until June 2027, with an option for another year.

== International career ==
In July 2019, Pierotti received a call-up from the Argentina U18s for the L'Alcúdia International Tournament in Spain.

== Personal life ==
Born in Argentina, Pierotti also holds an Italian passport.

== Career statistics ==
As of match played 8 March 2026

Appearances and goals by club, season and competition
Club	Season	League			National cup		League cup		Continental		Other		Total	
Club	Season	Division	Apps	Goals	Apps	Goals	Apps	Goals	Apps	Goals	Apps	Goals	Apps	Goals
Colón	2018–19	Argentine Primera División	0	0	—		1	0	—		—		1	0
Colón	2019–20	Argentine Primera División	7	0	1	1	—		2	0	—		10	1
Colón	2020–21	Argentine Primera División	1	0	1	0	—		—		—		2	0
Colón	2021	Argentine Primera División	28	2	1	0	—		—		—		29	2
Colón	2022	Argentine Primera División	31	3	2	0	—		5	0	—		38	4
Colón	2023	Argentine Primera División	34	2	3	1	—		—		—		37	3
Colón	Total		101	7	8	2	1	0	7	0	0	0	117	8
Lecce	2023–24	Serie A	11	0	—		—		—		—		11	0
Lecce	2024–25	Serie A	36	4	2	0	—		—		—		38	4
Lecce	2025–26	Serie A	27	1	2	0	—		—		—		29	1
Lecce	Total		74	5	4	0	0	0	0	0	0	0	78	5
Career total			175	12	12	2	1	0	7	0	0	0	195	13

== Honours ==
Colón

- Copa de la Liga Profesional: 2021
