= Wladimiro Falcone =

Italian footballer

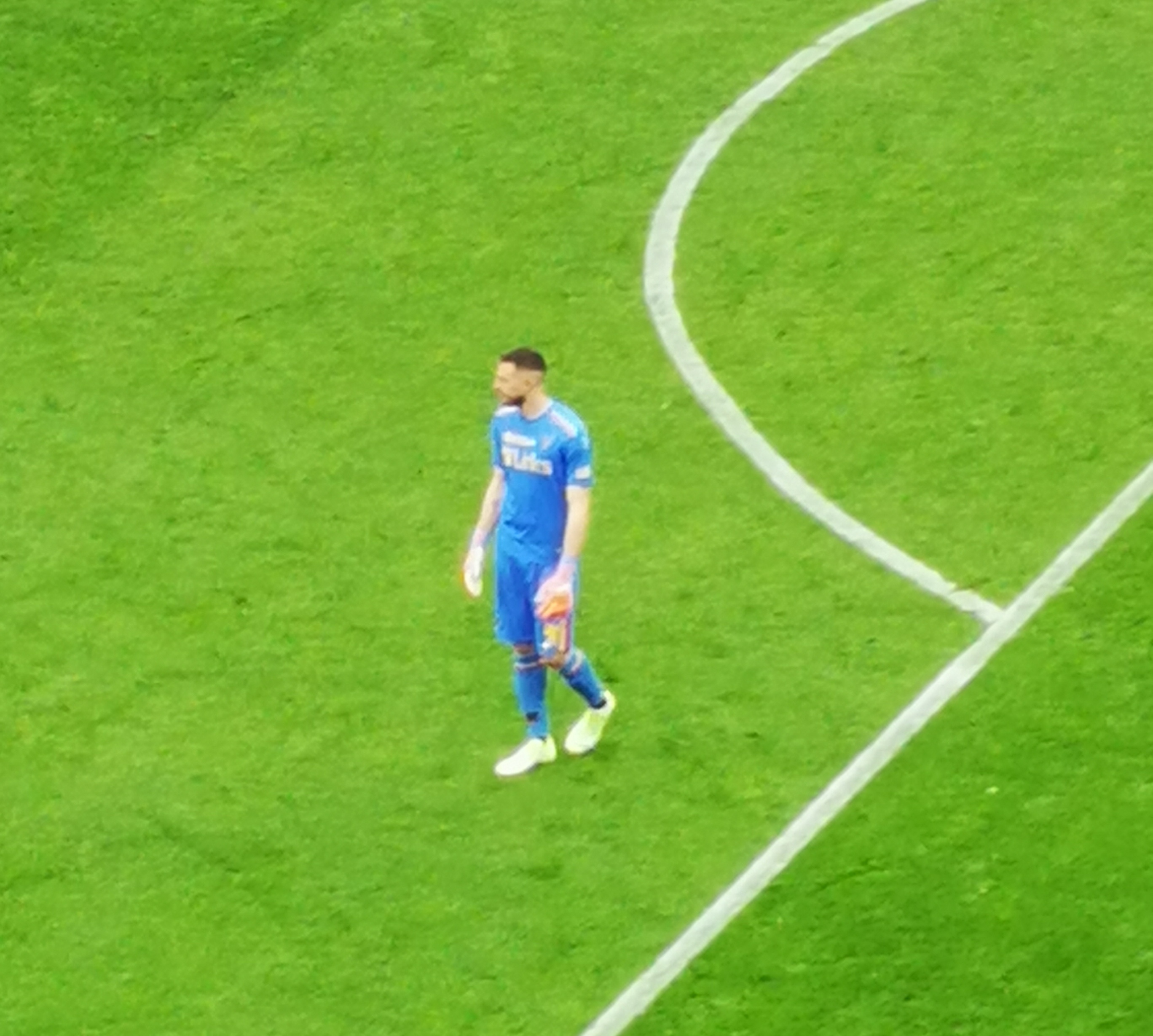
- Falcone in 2023 with Lecce

Personal information
- Date of birth: 12 April 1995 (age 31)
- Place of birth: Rome, Italy
- Height: 1.95 m (6 ft 5 in)
- Position: Goalkeeper

Team information
- Current team: Lecce
- Number: 30

Youth career
- 2000–2007: Lodigiani
- 2007–2009: Vigor Perconti
- 2009–2014: Sampdoria

Senior career*
Years	Team	Apps	(Gls)
2014–2023	Sampdoria	12	(0)
2014–2015	→ Como (loan)	9	(0)
2015–2016	→ Savona (loan)	29	(0)
2016–2017	→ Livorno (loan)	1	(0)
2017	→ Bassano Virtus (loan)	0	(0)
2018	→ Gavorrano (loan)	18	(0)
2018–2019	→ Lucchese (loan)	41	(0)
2020–2021	→ Cosenza (loan)	36	(0)
2022–2023	→ Lecce (loan)	38	(0)
2023–	Lecce	125	(0)

International career^{‡}
2012–2013	Italy U18	7	(0)
2013–2014	Italy U19	1	(0)
2015–2016	Italy U20	4	(0)
- * Club domestic league appearances and goals as of 7 November 2026 ‡ National team caps and goals as of 20 March 2018

Wladimiro Falcone (born 12 April 1995) is an Italian professional footballer who plays as a goalkeeper for Serie A club Lecce.

== Club career ==
=== Sampdoria ===
Born in Rome, Falcone played for local Roman clubs Lodigiani and Vigor Perconti, before joining the youth academy of Ligurian club Sampdoria. He was the first choice of their reserve team from 2012 to 2014, while also appearing as an unused bench for the first team.

==== Loans ====
On 25 July 2014, Falcone was signed by Lega Pro club Como in a temporary deal. The club won promotion to Serie B in 2015 as the promotion playoffs winner.

On 20 July 2015, he was signed by another third-level club, Savona, in a temporary deal.

On 9 July 2016, he left Samp once again for Livorno in another temporary deal. The club was relegated from Serie B to Lega Pro in 2016. On 31 January 2017, he returned to Sampdoria.

In July 2017, he joined Bassano on loan. But in January 2018, he left for Gavorrano. Later he went to Lucchese on loan.

==== Return and loan to Cosenza ====
In 2019 he came back to Sampdoria, and he made his debut for the club on 29 July 2020 in a 1–4 loss against Milan.

On 29 August 2020, he extended his contract for Sampdoria until 2024; on the same day, he went to Cosenza on a season loan.

During the whole 2020-21 season, Falcone established himself as the first-choice goalkeeper of the Silani and repeatedly stole the scene thanks to his performances, although he couldn't help Cosenza avoid relegation, as a 9-point gap between them and Ascoli allowed the latter team to stay in the second tier without playing a relegation play-out.

==== Loan to Lecce ====
On 17 July 2022, Falcone joined recently-promoted to Serie A side Lecce on a season-long loan. That season, he played all available minutes in the league, helping Lecce avoid relegation to Serie B.

=== Lecce ===
On 27 July 2023, Lecce announced the permanent signing of Falcone on a five-year contract, for a reported fee of €4 million.

== International career ==
In 2014, Falcone was a second-choice keeper for Italy's U-19 side during the qualifiers for the UEFA European Under-19 Championship, behind Pierluigi Gollini.

On 17 March 2023, Falcone received his first official call-up to the senior Italy national team for two UEFA Euro 2024 qualifying matches against England and Malta.

== Career statistics ==
As of match played 7 November 2026

Appearances and goals by club, season and competition
Club	Season	League			National cup		Other		Total	
Club	Season	Division	Apps	Goals	Apps	Goals	Apps	Goals	Apps	Goals
Sampdoria	2012–13	Serie A	0	0	0	0	—		0	0
Sampdoria	2013–14	Serie A	0	0	0	0	—		0	0
Sampdoria	2016–17	Serie A	0	0	0	0	—		0	0
Sampdoria	2019–20	Serie A	2	0	0	0	—		2	0
Sampdoria	2021–22	Serie A	10	0	2	0	—		12	0
Sampdoria	Total		12	0	2	0	—		14	0
Como (loan)	2014–15	Lega Pro	9	0	1	0	0	0	10	0
Savona (loan)	2015–16	Lega Pro	29	0	—		—		29	0
Livorno (loan)	2016–17	Lega Pro	1	0	1	0	—		2	0
Bassano Virtus (loan)	2017–18	Serie C	0	0	0	0	—		0	0
Gavorrano (loan)	2017–18	Serie C	16	0	0	0	2	0	18	0
Lucchese (loan)	2018–19	Serie C	37	0	—		4	0	41	0
Cosenza (loan)	2020–21	Serie B	36	0	2	0	—		38	0
Lecce (loan)	2022–23	Serie A	38	0	1	0	—		39	0
Lecce	2023–24	Serie A	38	0	1	0	—		39	0
Lecce	2024–25	Serie A	38	0	1	0	—		39	0
Lecce	2025–26	Serie A	38	0	1	0	—		39	0
Lecce	2026–27	Serie A	11	0	1	0	—		12	0
Lecce	Lecce total		163	0	5	0	—		168	0
Career total			303	0	11	0	6	0	320	0
