= Mohamed Kaba =

French footballer (born 2001)

Personal information
- Full name: Mohamed Kaba
- Date of birth: 27 October 2001 (age 25)
- Place of birth: Orléans, France
- Height: 1.85 m (6 ft 1 in)
- Position: Defensive midfielder

Team information
- Current team: Lecce
- Number: 77

Youth career
- 2019–2020: Valenciennes

Senior career*
Years	Team	Apps	(Gls)
2020–2023	Valenciennes B	4	(0)
2021–2023	Valenciennes	67	(5)
2023–	Lecce	53	(0)
2026	→ Nantes (loan)	12	(0)
- * Club domestic league appearances and goals as of 17 May 2026

Mohamed Kaba (born 27 October 2001) is a French professional footballer who plays as a defensive midfielder for Serie A club Lecce.

== Career ==
Kaba joined Valenciennes in 2019 and made his debuts with the reserve side in 2020. On 17 July 2021, he signed his first professional contract, tying him to the club for three years. On 24 July 2021, he made his professional debut in a 0–0 Ligue 2 draw to Niort.

On 14 August 2023, he joined Lecce.

On 29 January 2026, Kaba returned to France and joined Nantes on loan with an option to buy.

== Personal life ==
Born in France, Kaba holds French and Guinean nationalities.

== Career statistics ==
As of match played 2 May 2026

Appearances and goals by club, season and competition
Club	Season	League			National cup (Note: Includes Coupe de France, Coppa Italia)		Europe		Other		Total	
Club	Season	Division	Apps	Goals	Apps	Goals	Apps	Goals	Apps	Goals	Apps	Goals
Valenciennes B	2019–20	Championnat National	4	0	—		—		—		4	0
Valenciennes	2021–22	Ligue 2	34	0	3	0	—		—		37	0
Valenciennes	2022–23	Ligue 2	32	5	1	0	—		—		33	5
Valenciennes	2023–24	Ligue 2	1	0	0	0	—		—		1	0
Valenciennes	Total		67	5	4	0	0	0	0	0	71	5
Lecce	2023–24	Serie A	23	0	0	0	—		—		23	0
Lecce	2024–25	Serie A	15	0	0	0	—		—		15	0
Lecce	2025–26	Serie A	12	0	2	1	—		—		14	1
Lecce	Total		50	0	2	1	0	0	0	0	52	1
Nantes	2025–26	Ligue 1	11	0	—		—		—		11	0
Career total			132	5	6	1	0	0	0	0	138	6
