= Marco Sala (footballer, born 1999) =

Italian footballer

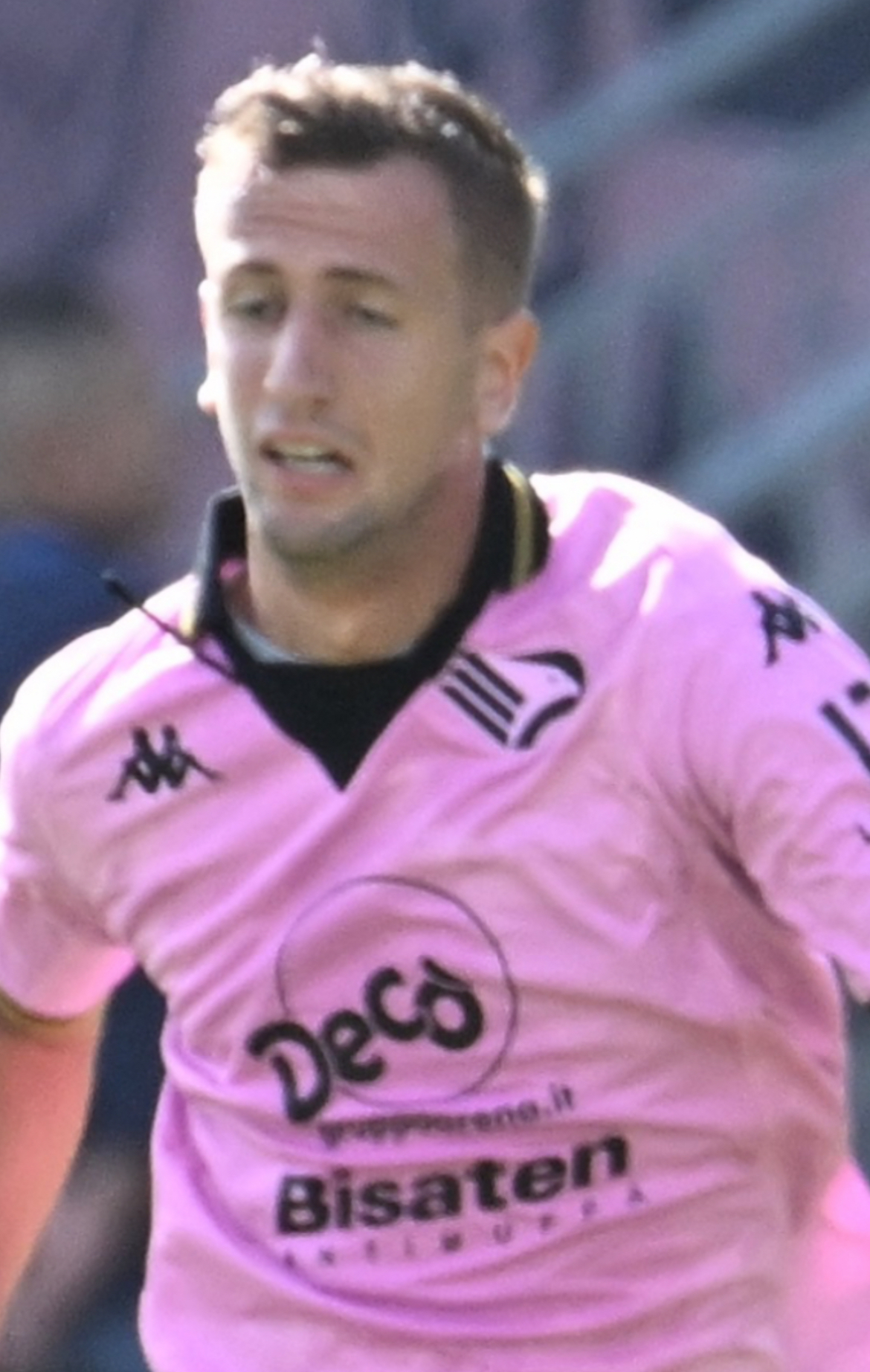

Personal information
- Date of birth: 4 June 1999 (age 27)
- Place of birth: Rho, Italy
- Height: 1.77 m (5 ft 10 in)
- Position: Left-back

Team information
- Current team: Avellino
- Number: 3

Youth career
- Inter Milan

Senior career*
Years	Team	Apps	(Gls)
2018–2019	Inter Milan	0	(0)
2018–2019	→ Arezzo (loan)	34	(2)
2019–2023	Sassuolo	0	(0)
2019–2020	→ Virtus Entella (loan)	33	(0)
2020–2021	→ SPAL (loan)	32	(0)
2021–2022	→ Crotone (loan)	28	(0)
2022–2023	→ Palermo (loan)	26	(1)
2023–2026	Como	37	(0)
2025	→ Lecce (loan)	2	(0)
2026–	Avellino	13	(0)

International career^{‡}
2016	Italy U18	1	(0)
2017	Italy U19	2	(0)
2018–2019	Italy U20	5	(0)
2019–2021	Italy U21	12	(0)
- * Club domestic league appearances and goals as of 10 May 2026 ‡ National team caps and goals as of 31 May 2021

Marco Sala (born 4 June 1999) is an Italian professional footballer who plays as a left-back for Serie B club Avellino.

== Club career ==
=== Inter Milan ===
Born in Rho, Sala was a youth exponent of Inter.

==== Loan to Arezzo ====
On 2 August 2018, Sala was loaned to Serie C club Arezzo on a 2-year loan deal. On 16 September, he made his professional debut in Serie C for Arezzo in a 1–0 away win over Lucchese. On 7 October he was sent-off with a double yellow card in the 77th minute of a 0–0 away draw against Robur Siena. Three weeks later, on 21 October, he scored his first professional goal in the 92nd minute of a 2–0 home win over Albissola. On 25 November, he scored his second goal in the 73rd minute of a 2–0 away win over Piacenza. Sala helped the club to reach the play-off; however, the club was eliminated by Pisa losing 4–2 on aggregate in the quarter-finals, and he ended his first season to Arezzo with 39 appearances, 2 goals and 8 assists.

=== Sassuolo ===
On 30 June 2019, Sala joined Sassuolo.

==== Loan to Virtus Entella ====
On 6 August 2019, Sala joined the newly Serie B promoted club Virtus Entella on loan until 30 June 2020. Five days later, on 11 August, he made his debut for the club in a 2–1 home defeat against Südtirol in the second round of Coppa Italia, he played the entire match. Two more weeks later, on 24 August, he made his Serie B debut for Virtus Entella in a 1–0 home win over Livorno, and he played the entire match again. He became a regular starter early in the season. Sala ended his season-long loan to Virtus Entella with 34 appearances, including 32 of them as a starter. He was replaced only 2 times during the season, and made 6 assists during the loan.

==== Loan to SPAL ====
On 26 September 2020, he joined SPAL on a season-long loan deal. Four days later, on 30 September, Sala made his debut for the club in a match won 4–2 at penalties after a 0–0 home draw against Bari in the second round of Coppa Italia, he played the entire match. On 3 October, he made his league debut for the club as a substitute, replacing Marco D'Alessandro in the 78th minute of a 1–1 home draw against Cosenza. On 20 October, Sala played his first match as a starter for the club in Serie B in a 2–1 away defeat against Empoli, Bartosz Salamon replaced him after 71 minutes. Twelve days later, on 1 November, he played his first entire match for the club, a 1–0 away win over Reggina. Sala ended his season-long loan to SPAL with 37 appearances, including 23 as a starter and 4 assists.

==== Loan to Crotone ====
On 17 August 2021, Sala was loaned to Serie B side Crotone on a season-long loan deal.

==== Loan to Palermo ====
On 28 July 2022, Sala was loaned to Palermo in Serie B, with an option to buy.

=== Como ===
On 24 July 2023, Sala signed a three-year contract with Como. On 3 February 2025, Sala moved on loan to Lecce, with an option to buy.

=== Avellino ===
On 3 January 2026, Sala moved to Avellino on a two-and-a-half-year contract.

== International career ==
He made his debut with the Italy U21 on 6 September 2019, in a friendly match winning 4–0 against Moldova.

== Career statistics ==
=== Club ===
As of match played 8 December 2024

Appearances and goals by club, season and competition
Club	Season	League			Cup		Europe		Other		Total	
Club	Season	Division	Apps	Goals	Apps	Goals	Apps	Goals	Apps	Goals	Apps	Goals
Arezzo (loan)	2018–19	Serie C	34	2	0	0	—		5 (Note: All appearance(s) in Serie C play-off.)	0	39	2
Virtus Entella (loan)	2019–20	Serie B	33	0	1	0	—		—		34	0
SPAL (loan)	2020–21	Serie B	32	0	5	0	—		—		37	0
Crotone (loan)	2021–22	Serie B	28	0	1	0	—		—		29	0
Palermo (loan)	2022–23	Serie B	26	1	1	0	—		—		27	1
Como	2023–24	Serie B	29	0	0	0	—		—		29	0
Como	2024–25	Serie A	8	0	1	0	—		—		9	0
Como	Total		37	0	1	0	—		—		38	0
Lecce (loan)	2024–25	Serie A	2	0	0	0	—		—		2	0
Career total			192	3	9	0	0	0	5	0	206	3

== Honours ==
=== Club ===
Inter Primavera

- Campionato Nazionale Primavera: 2016–17, 2017–18
- Supercoppa Primavera: 2018
- Torneo di Viareggio: 2018
