= Ylber Ramadani =

Albanian footballer (born 1996)

Personal information
- Date of birth: 12 April 1996 (age 30)
- Place of birth: Starnberg, Germany
- Height: 1.85 m (6 ft 1 in)
- Position: Defensive midfielder

Team information
- Current team: Çorum
- Number: 20

Youth career
- –2011: Çeliku
- 2011–2013: Ferizaj

Senior career*
Years	Team	Apps	(Gls)
2013–2014	Ferizaj	42	(3)
2014–2015	Prishtina	14	(1)
2015–2016	Drita	17	(1)
2016	Partizani B	7	(0)
2016–2017	Partizani	35	(0)
2017–2021	Vejle BK	117	(5)
2021–2022	MTK Budapest	30	(2)
2022–2023	Aberdeen	37	(1)
2023–2026	Lecce	100	(3)
2026–	Çorum	10	(0)

International career^{‡}
2014–2015	Kosovo U19	1	(1)
2016–2018	Albania U21	8	(1)
2018–	Albania	54	(1)
- * Club domestic league appearances and goals as of 8 November 2026 ‡ National team caps and goals as of 12 November 2026

Ylber Ramadani (Albanian pronunciation: [ˈylbɛɾ ɾamaˈdani]; born 12 April 1996) is an Albanian professional footballer who plays as a defensive midfielder for Turkish club Çorum and the Albania national team.

Born in Germany to Kosovo Albanian parents, Ramadani began his career in Kosovo at youth level with Çeliku, before playing senior football in the Kosovo Superleague for Ferizaj, Prishtina and Drita. In 2016, he joined Albanian club Partizani, where he established himself as a regular starter and was named the Albanian Best Young Player of the Season. The following year, he signed for Danish side Vejle, becoming a key player during a four-year spell across the Danish 1st Division and Danish Superliga, while earning recognition for his consistency, ball-winning ability, work rate and physical endurance, and helping the club secure promotion to the top flight on two occasions. In 2021, Ramadani joined Hungarian club MTK Budapest, where he captained the team on several occasions during his only season at the club. He then moved to Scottish side Aberdeen, quickly becoming a key first-team player and an ever-present figure during the 2022–23 season as he helped the club reach the semi-finals of the Scottish League Cup and finish third in the Scottish Premiership. In 2023, he signed for Italian club Lecce, where he established himself as a regular starter in Serie A and received praise for his tactical discipline, consistency and energetic midfield performances.

Internationally, Ramadani initially represented Kosovo at youth level, before switching his allegiance to Albania in 2016 and featuring for its youth teams. He made his senior international debut in 2018 and established himself as a regular under Edoardo Reja, before becoming one of Albania's key midfielders under Sylvinho, playing an important role in the country's successful UEFA Euro 2024 qualifying campaign as Albania topped their qualifying group for the first time in history, and featuring in all three matches at the final tournament, where he earned praise for his work rate, defensive contribution and consistency.

== Club career ==
=== Early career in Kosovo ===
Ramadani was born in Starnberg, Germany, to Kosovo-Albanian parents originally from the village of Vojnoc near Shtime, where he spent part of his childhood and helped his family with agricultural work. He began his football career at youth level with local third-tier club Çeliku in Ferizaj. At the age of 15, he was invited to play for the senior team in a friendly match against Ferizaj due to a shortage of players; his performance impressed the Ferizaj coaching staff and led to a transfer shortly afterwards. At Ferizaj, Ramadani progressed through the youth system and made his senior debut during the 2013–14 Kosovo Superleague season at the age of 17, establishing himself as a regular, making 29 league appearances and scoring once as the club finished fourth. During the first half of the 2014–15 season, he made 13 appearances and scored twice before joining Prishtina in the second half of the campaign and made 14 appearances and scored once as Prishtina finished third in the league. On 1 August 2015, Ramadani signed for Drita of Gjilan, remaining in the Kosovo Superleague for another season. During the first half of the 2015–16 season, he made 17 league appearances before leaving the club during the winter transfer window.

=== Partizani ===
In December 2015, Ramadani was linked with a move to Partizani of the Kategoria Superiore ahead of the January transfer window and began training with the club before signing a three-year contract on 10 January 2016. The transfer was completed on 10 February after Partizani reached an agreement with Drita, who had initially refused to release him. Following his arrival, Ramadani initially played for Partizani Tirana B in the 2015–16 Kategoria e Dytë while also featuring occasionally for the first team, making eight appearances for the B team and helping them secure promotion after a 4–1 win over Sopoti Librazhd in the 2015–16 Kategoria e Parë play-out. He made his senior debut on 17 April 2016, coming on as a substitute in a 3–0 home win against Vllaznia on matchday 30 of the 2015–16 Kategoria Superiore. He went on to make three league appearances as Partizani finished runners-up and qualified for the UEFA Europa League first qualifying round.

Ramadani made his European debut on 28 June 2016, playing the full match in a 0–0 draw against Slovan Bratislava in the UEFA Europa League first qualifying round. Following the exclusion of Skënderbeu from the 2016–17 UEFA Champions League qualifying in July 2016, Partizani entered the competition as Albanian runners-up to face Ferencváros in the second qualifying round. He played the full matches in both legs as Partizani advanced 3–1 on penalties after two 1–1 draws. He also featured in both matches against Red Bull Salzburg in the third qualifying round as Partizani were eliminated 3–0 on aggregate. Partizani then faced Krasnodar in the Europa League play-off round during August 2016, where he started both legs before being substituted due to injury in the 22nd minute of the second leg as the team were eliminated 4–0 on aggregate.

During autumn, he made three starts in the 2016–17 Albanian Cup as Partizani were eliminated 2–1 on aggregate in the round of 16 by second-tier side Besëlidhja Lezhë. During the early stages of the 2016–17 Kategoria Superiore, he was mainly used as a substitute before establishing himself as a regular starter in central midfield. As the season progressed, he became an important part of Partizani's defensive structure, frequently completing full matches, with the team keeping 20 clean sheets and conceding more than one goal in only two league matches. Partizani finished the season with the league's best defensive record, conceding only 17 goals but missed out on the championship title by three points to Kukësi. In his first full season, he made 42 appearances in all competitions and was named the Championship Best Young Player of the season. Following his breakthrough season, he attracted interest from Dutch clubs Heerenveen and AZ Alkmaar, with Partizani reportedly valuing him at around €200,000.

=== Vejle ===
On 13 June 2017, Danish 1st Division club Vejle announced the signing of Ramadani from Partizani Tirana for a reported fee of €200,000, with the player presented on the same day after signing a four-year contract with an option to extend for a further year. The transfer was reportedly influenced by then head coach Adolfo Sormani, who had previously worked with him at Partizani and strongly supported the move. He quickly established himself as a regular starter, featuring consistently throughout the campaign. His performances in the first half of the season earned him a maiden call-up to the Albania senior national team in November 2017. On 26 November 2017, he scored his first goal in Denmark in a 4–1 victory over Vendsyssel, equalising early in the match as Vejle maintained their position at the top of the table. On 17 May 2018, he was named man of the match in a 1–0 win over Fredericia, with Danish media praising his midfield performance, particularly his ball-winning ability and consistency, with reports noting that such performances had become expected throughout the season. In his debut season, he made 31 league appearances as Vejle won the 1st Division title and secured promotion to the Danish Superliga.

In the 2018–19 Danish Superliga, Ramadani remained a regular starter, frequently completing full matches. He was noted for his exceptional work rate and endurance, reportedly covering a league-high average distance per match of 13.487 kilometres and playing a key role in both defensive and attacking phases. He made 26 league appearances as Vejle finished second from bottom and were relegated to the 1st Division.

On 29 November 2019, he scored a long-range goal in a 4–3 comeback away win over Viborg in the 2019–20 season, reducing the deficit in the 29th minute after Vejle had fallen 2–0 behind and helping the team maintain its position at the top of the table. On 2 March 2020, he scored the only goal in a 1–0 win over Køge, finding the net from distance shortly after the hour mark and subsequently being named man of the match as Vejle extended their lead at the top of the table in the race for promotion. On 14 July 2020, he scored the winning goal against Nykøbing with a powerful long-range strike to secure Vejle's promotion back to the top flight with two matches remaining in the season. He finished the season with 31 league appearances and three goals.

Ahead of the 2020–21 season, Ramadani was linked with a move away from Denmark, with reports claiming that he was close to joining a Belgian top-flight club while also attracting interest from AEK Athens and Lokomotiva Zagreb. On 13 September 2020, he tested positive for COVID-19 while on international duty, briefly isolating in Albania and missing Vejle's opening match of the 2020–21 Danish Superliga before returning to training and competitive action shortly afterwards. He remained an important member of the squad throughout the 2020–21 campaign, scoring his only goal of the season in a 2–1 defeat against Copenhagen on 4 March 2021 and earning a 7.3 rating from SofaScore for his performance. In his final season with the club, he made 32 appearances and scored once as Vejle finished 10th in the league, retained its top-flight status and also reached the quarter-finals of the 2020–21 Danish Cup.

On 23 May 2021, after four seasons at the club, Vejle announced that Ramadani would not extend his contract.

=== MTK Budapest ===
On 14 June 2021, Ramadani joined Hungarian club MTK Budapest on a free transfer. He made his debut on 30 July 2021 in the opening match of the 2021–22 NB I season, playing the full 90 minutes in a 1–1 away draw against Gyirmót. During the season, Ramadani established himself as a regular starter, making 30 league appearances and becoming one of the most frequently used players in the squad. He also captained the team on several occasions and scored his first goal for the club on 5 December 2021 in a 2–1 victory over league leaders Puskás Akadémia, a result that temporarily moved MTK out of the relegation zone. On 15 May 2022, he scored his second league goal in stoppage time during a 3–0 win over Debrecen in the final match of the season, although the victory was not enough to prevent MTK from being relegated after finishing 11th, two points behind safety.

=== Aberdeen ===
On 8 June 2022, Ramadani signed for Scottish Premiership club Aberdeen on a three-year contract for an undisclosed fee. He made his competitive debut on 13 July, playing the full 90 minutes in a 2–0 victory over Dumbarton in the second match of the 2022–23 Scottish League Cup group stage. Ramadani quickly established himself as a regular starter and remained ever-present throughout Aberdeen's League Cup campaign, providing his first assist for the club in a 5–0 win over Peterhead one week later as Aberdeen finished top of their group with maximum points and 12 goals scored without conceding, before recording 4–1 victories in both the round of 16 and quarter-finals and eventually being eliminated by Rangers after extra time in the semi-finals. In the 2022–23 Scottish Premiership season, he was nearly ever-present, missing only nine minutes of league action and featuring in every match except matchday 32, while contributing one goal and two assists in league victories, although he accumulated several yellow cards, including bookings in four consecutive matches between October and November 2022. He scored his first goal on 4 November 2022 in a 4–1 victory over Hibernian, netting in the 61st minute with a first-time strike from outside the penalty area. Ramadani made an immediate impact as an integral part of the Dons, with his consistent performances making him a fan favourite. Following Aberdeen's 2–0 victory over Rangers on 23 April 2023, he received praise for his defensive contribution and ball-winning display in midfield, earning a place in Kris Boyd's Team of the Week. He made 44 appearances in all competitions and scored once, as the team finished third in the league and qualified for the UEFA Europa League group stage; in August 2023, he left the club to join Lecce in Italy.

=== Lecce ===
On 4 August 2023, Ramadani completed a transfer to Serie A club Lecce for an undisclosed fee, signing a three-year contract with an option for a further year. Ramadani made his debut on 13 August 2023 in a 1–0 win over Como in the 2023–24 Coppa Italia, helping Lecce qualify for the round of 32 and earning praise for his performance in midfield. A week later, he made his Serie A debut in a 2–1 victory against Lazio. In his first season at the club, Ramadani established himself as a regular starter, making 36 appearances across Serie A and the Coppa Italia, playing over 3,000 minutes and scoring once as Lecce finished 14th in the league. On 16 December 2023, he scored his first goal, a late winner in the 89th minute of a 2–1 home victory over Frosinone, earning Lecce important points in their battle against relegation. His performances in midfield received praise from Italian media, with Calcio Lecce describing him as “uomo ovunque” (“a man everywhere”) for his work rate and defensive contributions.

During the 2024–25 season, Ramadani remained an important player for Lecce as the club continued its fight to stay in Serie A. Following the appointment of head coach Marco Giampaolo in November 2024, he experienced a period of reduced playing time, with several appearances coming from the bench. In an interview, Ramadani described the period as difficult, citing minor back problems while stating that he continued to work hard in training. He later regained his place in the starting lineup and featured regularly during the final months of the campaign. On 19 May 2025, he scored the winning goal in a 1–0 home victory over Torino. He finished the season with 29 Serie A appearances and one Coppa Italia appearance, scoring once as Lecce finished 17th, three points above the relegation zone.

On 16 February 2026, Ramadani scored his first goal of the 2025–26 season in the 76th minute with a long-range strike in a 2–0 away victory against Cagliari on matchday 25 of the 2025–26 Serie A, helping Lecce move three points clear of the relegation zone. Following his performance against Cagliari, he was named in the Serie A Team of the Week. On 21 April 2026, he made his 100th appearance for Lecce in a 1–1 draw against Fiorentina, where he was rated as the best player on the pitch by Flashscore and was included in the Serie A Team of the Week for matchday 33. Ramadani played a key role in Lecce's successful battle against relegation, which was secured following a final-day victory over Genoa. The result ensured the club's place in Serie A for a fifth consecutive season, marking the first time in Lecce's history that they had remained in the top flight for five straight campaigns.

=== Çorum ===
On 8 July 2026, Ramadani reached an agreement with Turkish club Çorum and signed a two-year contract with an option for a further year. According to Italian media, Ramadani agreed to a reported annual net salary of €1.5 million, nearly double his earnings at Lecce, with the improved financial terms cited as the main factor behind his move in Turkey despite having one year remaining on his contract.

== International career ==
Ramadani received his first call-up to the Kosovo under-19 team in October 2015 for a friendly against Albania, scoring on his debut in a 2–0 victory. He also represented the under-21 team.

On 18 August 2016, Ramadani was granted Albanian citizenship and switched his international allegiance to Albania. He was subsequently called up to the Albania under-21 team for the 2017 European Under-21 qualification, making his debut on 10 October 2016 in a 4–0 away defeat to Israel. During the following qualifying campaign, he established himself as a regular starter, making 11 appearances in total, and received his first senior call-up from manager Christian Panucci for the friendly against Turkey on 13 November 2017, describing the selection as a "dream come true". He scored his first under-21 international goal on 10 November in a 1–1 draw against Northern Ireland, remained an unused substitute in Albania's 3–2 victory over Turkey three days later. He made his senior debut on 26 March 2018 in a 1–0 home defeat to Norway.

Following the appointment of Edoardo Reja in 2019, Ramadani established himself as a regular member of the national team during the UEFA Euro 2020 qualifying campaign, making three appearances, all as a starter and scoring on his debut in a 2–0 victory over Moldova on 11 June 2019. During the 2022 FIFA World Cup qualification campaign, Ramadani made six appearances, including three starts, and played just over 300 minutes as Albania finished third in the group and missed out on the play-offs.

Under new manager Sylvinho, Ramadani was ever-present until the penultimate match of the UEFA Euro 2024 qualifying campaign, alternating between defensive, central and attacking midfield as Albania recovered from an opening defeat to record four wins and one draw while conceding only two further goals, securing qualification for the finals with a match to spare. Ramadani was rested for the final qualifier against the Faroe Islands as Albania earned the point required to finish top of the group ahead of the Czech Republic on the head-to-head tiebreaker, with both teams finishing on 15 points. Ramadani was subsequently named in Albania's final 26-man squad for UEFA Euro 2024, and he completed all three group-stage matches in midfield as Albania finished bottom of Group B with one point and were eliminated. His performances earned praise for his work rate and defensive contribution.

During the 2024–25 UEFA Nations League B, Ramadani remained an ever-present starter until being substituted late in Albania's final group match, as the team recorded two wins and one draw but finished bottom in a tightly contested group, resulting in relegation to League C. During the 2026 FIFA World Cup qualification campaign, Ramadani started Albania's opening match under Sylvinho, playing the full 90 minutes in a 2–0 defeat to England on 21 March 2025, but lost his place three days later following the emergence of Juljan Shehu, remaining an unused substitute, making only one brief substitute appearance for much of the campaign before returning to the starting lineup for the penultimate match after Albania had already secured a place in the play-offs, with Shehu rested to avoid suspension due to yellow-card accumulation.

== Personal life ==
Ramadani became engaged to Dardana Hoxhaj in December 2017 while playing for Vejle in Denmark. He is noted for speaking six languages fluently: Albanian, German, English, Danish, Hungarian and Italian.

== Career statistics ==
=== Club ===
As of match played 8 November 2026

Appearances and goals by club, season and competition
Club	Season	League			Cup		Continental		Other		Total	
Club	Season	Division	Apps	Goals	Apps	Goals	Apps	Goals	Apps	Goals	Apps	Goals
Ferizaj	2013–14	Kosovo Superleague	29	1	—		—		—		29	1
Ferizaj	2014–15	Kosovo Superleague	13	2	—		—		—		13	2
Ferizaj	Total		42	3	—		—		—		42	3
Prishtina	2014–15	Kosovo Superleague	14	1	—		—		—		14	1
Drita	2015–16	Kosovo Superleague	17	1	—		—		—		17	1
Partizani B	2015–16	Kategoria e Dytë	7	0	—		—		1 (Note: Appearance in Kategoria e Parë play-out)	0	8	0
Partizani	2015–16	Kategoria Superiore	3	0	1	0	—		—		4	0
Partizani	2016–17	Kategoria Superiore	32	0	3	0	7 (Note: Four appearances in UEFA Champions League, three appearances in UEFA Europa League)	0	—		42	0
Partizani	Total		35	0	4	0	7	0	—		46	0
Vejle Boldklub	2017–18	Danish 1st Division	31	1	1	0	—		—		32	1
Vejle Boldklub	2018–19	Danish Superliga	26	0	1	0	—		1 (Note: Appearance in Danish Superliga relegation play-offs)	0	28	0
Vejle Boldklub	2019–20	Danish 1st Division	31	3	—		—		—		31	3
Vejle Boldklub	2020–21	Danish Superliga	29	1	3	0	—		—		32	1
Vejle Boldklub	Total		117	5	5	0	—		1	0	123	5
MTK Budapest	2021–22	Nemzeti Bajnokság	30	2	1	0	—		—		31	2
Aberdeen	2022–23	Scottish Premiership	37	1	7	0	—		—		44	1
Lecce	2023–24	Serie A	34	1	2	0	—		—		36	1
Lecce	2024–25	Serie A	29	1	1	0	—		—		30	1
Lecce	2025–26	Serie A	37	1	1	0	—		—		38	1
Lecce	Total		100	3	4	0	—		—		104	3
Çorum	2026–27	Süper Lig	10	0	—		—		—		10	0
Career total			409	16	21	0	7	0	2	0	439	16

=== International ===
As of match played 12 November 2026

Appearances and goals by national team and year
National team	Year	Apps	Goals
Albania	2018	4	0
Albania	2019	3	1
Albania	2020	2	0
Albania	2021	6	0
Albania	2022	9	0
Albania	2023	8	0
Albania	2024	12	0
Albania	2025	4	0
Albania	2026	6	0
Total		54	1

Scores and results list Albania's goal tally first.

List of international goals scored by Ylber Ramadani
No.	Date	Venue	Opponent	Score	Result	Competition
1.	11 June 2019	Elbasan Arena, Elbasan, Albania	Moldova	2–0	2–0	UEFA Euro 2020 qualification

== Honours ==
Individual

- Kategoria Superiore Best Young Player: 2016–17
