= Kialonda Gaspar =

Angolan footballer

Personal information
- Full name: Esmevânio Kialonda Gaspar
- Date of birth: 27 September 1997 (age 29)
- Place of birth: Dundo, Angola
- Height: 1.93 m (6 ft 4 in)
- Position: Centre-back

Team information
- Current team: Lecce
- Number: 4

Senior career*
| Years | Team | Apps | (Gls) |
| 2018–2022 | Sagrada Esperança | 75 | (4) |
| 2022–2024 | Estrela da Amadora | 57 | (2) |
| 2024– | Lecce | 52 | (1) |

International career^{‡}
| 2021– | Angola | 59 | (1) |
- * Club domestic league appearances and goals as of 13:58, 18 October 2026 (UTC) ‡ National team caps and goals as of 15:44, 24 June 2026 (UTC)

Esmevânio Kialonda Gaspar (born 27 September 1997), sometimes known as just Gaspar, is an Angolan professional footballer who plays as a centre-back for Serie A club Lecce.

== Club career ==
Gaspar began his playing career with the Angolan club Sagrada Esperança, where he played for four seasons. On 1 August 2022, he transferred to Liga Portugal 2 club Estrela da Amadora.

On 12 July 2024, Gaspar signed a contract with Italian club Lecce for three years, with an option for two more. On his competitive debut for Lecce on 12 August 2024 in a Coppa Italia game against Mantova, Gaspar scored a goal in a 2–1 victory.

== International career ==
On 3 December 2025, Gaspar was called up to the Angola squad for the 2025 Africa Cup of Nations.

== Career statistics ==
=== Club ===
As of match played 18 October 2026

Appearances and goals by club, season and competition
| Club | Season | League | | | National cup | | League cup | | Continental | | Other | | Total | |
| Club | Season | Division | Apps | Goals | Apps | Goals | Apps | Goals | Apps | Goals | Apps | Goals | Apps | Goals |
|---|---|---|---|---|---|---|---|---|---|---|---|---|---|---|
| Sagrada Esperança | 2018–19 | Girabola | 10 | 1 | 0 | 0 | — | | — | | — | | 10 | 1 |
| Sagrada Esperança | 2019–20 | Girabola | 14 | 1 | 3 | 0 | — | | — | | — | | 17 | 1 |
| Sagrada Esperança | 2020–21 | Girabola | 19 | 1 | 2 | 0 | — | | 1 (Note: Appearance in CAF Confederation Cup) | 0 | — | | 22 | 1 |
| Sagrada Esperança | 2021–22 | Girabola | 15 | 1 | 1 | 0 | — | | 9 (Note: Appearances in CAF Champions League) | 0 | 1 (Note: Appearance in Supertaça de Angola) | 0 | 26 | 1 |
| Sagrada Esperança | Total | | 58 | 4 | 6 | 0 | — | | 10 | 0 | 1 | 0 | 75 | 4 |
| Estrela da Amadora | 2022–23 | Liga Portugal 2 | 30 | 1 | 1 | 0 | 0 | 0 | — | | 2 (Note: Appearances in Liga Portugal 2 promotion play-offs) | 0 | 33 | 1 |
| Estrela da Amadora | 2023–24 | Primeira Liga | 27 | 1 | 2 | 0 | 1 | 0 | — | | — | | 30 | 1 |
| Estrela da Amadora | Total | | 57 | 2 | 3 | 0 | 1 | 0 | — | | 2 | 0 | 63 | 2 |
| Lecce | 2024–25 | Serie A | 24 | 0 | 2 | 1 | — | | — | | — | | 26 | 1 |
| Lecce | 2025–26 | Serie A | 23 | 0 | 2 | 0 | — | | — | | — | | 25 | 0 |
| Lecce | 2026–27 | Serie A | 5 | 1 | 1 | 0 | — | | — | | — | | 6 | 1 |
| Lecce | Total | | 52 | 1 | 5 | 1 | — | | — | | — | | 57 | 2 |
| Career total | | | 167 | 7 | 14 | 1 | 1 | 0 | 10 | 0 | 3 | 0 | 195 | 8 |

=== International ===
As of match played 9 June 2026

| National team | Year | Apps | Goals |
|---|---|---|---|
| Angola | 2020 | 2 | 0 |
| Angola | 2021 | 6 | 0 |
| Angola | 2022 | 9 | 0 |
| Angola | 2023 | 4 | 1 |
| Angola | 2024 | 16 | 0 |
| Angola | 2025 | 12 | 0 |
| Angola | 2026 | 1 | 0 |
| Total | | 49 | 1 |

== Honours ==
Sagrada Esperança

- Girabola: 2020–21
- Supertaça de Angola: 2021

Individual

- Liga Portugal 2 Team of the Season: 2022–23
