= Antonino Gallo =

Italian footballer (born 2000)

Personal information
- Date of birth: 5 January 2000 (age 26)
- Place of birth: Palermo, Italy
- Height: 1.83 m (6 ft 0 in)
- Position: Left-back

Team information
- Current team: Lecce
- Number: 25

Youth career
- –2019: Palermo

Senior career*
Years	Team	Apps	(Gls)
2019–	Lecce	180	(1)
2020	→ Virtus Francavilla (loan)	8	(0)
- * Club domestic league appearances and goals as of 25 May 2026

Antonino Gallo (born 5 January 2000) is an Italian professional footballer who plays as a left-back for Serie A club Lecce.

== Career ==
Gallo was raised in the youth system of Palermo and started playing for their Under-19 squad in the 2016–17 season. He was called up to the senior squad on several occasions in the 2017–18 and 2018–19 seasons but did not see time on the field. In the summer of 2019, Palermo went bankrupt, making Gallo a free agent.

On 25 July 2019, he signed with Serie A club Lecce. In the first part of the 2019–20 season, he was included in the matchday squad regularly, but did not make any appearances.

On 21 January 2020, he joined Serie C club Virtus Francavilla on loan. He made his professional Serie C debut for Virtus Francavilla on 26 January 2020 in a game against Paganese. He substituted Matteo Calcagno in the 61st minute. On 9 February 2020, he made his first start against Avellino.

On 24 January 2021, he made his Serie B debut with Lecce in a game against Empoli. One year later, on 23 January 2022, he scored his first professional goal in a home game against Cremonese.

== Personal life ==
In August 2022, Gallo had his first son with his partner Stephanie, daughter of former Lecce and Palermo player Guillermo Giacomazzi.

== Career statistics ==
As of match played 25 May 2025

Appearances and goals by club, season and competition
Club	Season	League			National cup		Continental		Others		Total	
Club	Season	Division	Apps	Goals	Apps	Goals	Apps	Goals	Apps	Goals	Apps	Goals
Palermo	2018–19	Serie B	0	0	–		–		–		0	0
Lecce	2019–20	Serie A	0	0	–		–		–		0	0
Lecce	2020–21	Serie B	19	0	–		–		2	0	21	0
Lecce	2021–22	Serie B	26	1	1	0	–		–		27	1
Lecce	2022–23	Serie A	32	0	1	0	–		–		33	0
Lecce	2023–24	Serie A	35	0	2	0	–		–		37	0
Lecce	2024–25	Serie A	31	0	2	0	–		–		33	0
Lecce	Total		143	1	6	0	0	0	2	0	151	1
Virtus Francavilla (loan)	2019-20	Serie C	8	0	–		–		–		8	0
Career total			151	1	6	0	0	0	2	0	159	1
