= Alexandru Borbei =

Romanian footballer (born 2003)

Personal information
- Full name: Gabriel Alexandru Borbei
- Date of birth: 27 June 2003 (age 23)
- Place of birth: Petrila, Romania
- Height: 1.91 m (6 ft 3 in)
- Position: Goalkeeper

Team information
- Current team: Lecce
- Number: 32

Youth career
- 2009–2013: Pro Junior Petroșani
- 2013–2015: LPS Banatul Timișoara
- 2015–2018: ASU Politehnica Timișoara
- 2020–2024: Lecce

Senior career*
Years	Team	Apps	(Gls)
2019–2020	ASU Politehnica Timișoara	8	(0)
2022–	Lecce	0	(0)
2025	→ CFR Cluj (loan)	0	(0)
2025–2026	→ Foggia (loan)	13	(0)

International career^{‡}
2019	Romania U16	2	(0)
2019–2020	Romania U17	2	(0)
2021–2022	Romania U19	5	(0)
2021–2024	Romania U20	4	(0)
- * Club domestic league appearances and goals as of 5 March 2026 ‡ National team caps and goals as of 16 October 2023

Gabriel Alexandru Borbei (born 27 June 2003) is a Romanian professional footballer who plays as a goalkeeper for Serie A club Lecce.

== Club career ==
Borbei started his senior career with ASU Politehnica Timișoara, at the age of 15, making his Liga II debut on 14 April 2019 in a 4–0 victory over Dacia Unirea Brăila.

In October 2020, Borbei moved to Serie B club Lecce. A mainstay of their Primavera team, he signed his first professional contract with Lecce in July 2022.

On 4 February 2025, he was loaned to Liga I club CFR Cluj, until the end of the season with a buy option clause.

On 8 August 2025, Borbei was loaned by Foggia in Serie C.

== Career statistics ==
As of match played 20 September 2026

Appearances and goals by club, season and competition
Club	Season	League			National cup (Note: Includes Coppa Italia Serie C)		Total	
Club	Season	Division	Apps	Goals	Apps	Goals	Apps	Goals
ASU Politehnica Timișoara	2018–19	Liga II	3	0	0	0	3	0
ASU Politehnica Timișoara	2019–20	Liga II	0	0	0	0	0	0
ASU Politehnica Timișoara	2020–21	Liga II	5	0	0	0	5	0
ASU Politehnica Timișoara	Total		8	0	0	0	8	0
Lecce	2023–24	Serie A	0	0	0	0	0	0
Lecce	2024–25	Serie A	0	0	0	0	0	0
Lecce	2026–27	Serie A	0	0	0	0	0	0
Lecce	Total		0	0	0	0	0	0
CFR Cluj (loan)	2024–25	Liga I	0	0	0	0	0	0
Foggia (loan)	2025–26	Serie C	13	0	1	0	14	0
Career total			21	0	1	0	22	0

== Honours ==
CFR Cluj

- Cupa României: 2024–25
