= Elijah Scott =

American soccer player (born 2006)

Personal information
- Full name: Elijah Monte Scott
- Date of birth: 3 February 2006 (age 20)
- Place of birth: Germany
- Height: 1.77 m (5 ft 10 in)
- Position: Defender

Team information
- Current team: Lecce
- Number: 31

Youth career
- –2022: SG Sonnenhof Großaspach
- 2023–2024: VfB Stuttgart
- 2025–: Lecce

Senior career*
Years	Team	Apps	(Gls)
2024	VfB Stuttgart II	1	(0)
2025–	Lecce	0	(0)

International career
2023	Germany U18	2	(0)
2026–	United States U20	1	(0)
- * Club domestic league appearances and goals

Elijah Monte Scott (born 3 February 2006) is a professional soccer player who plays as a defender for Serie A club Lecce. Born in Germany, he has represented Germany and the United States internationally at youth level.

== Club career ==
As a youth player, Scott joined the youth academy of German side SG Sonnenhof Großaspach. Following his stint there, he joined the youth academy of German side VfB Stuttgart in 2023, where he played in the UEFA Youth League and was promoted to the club's reserve team in 2024, where he made one league appearance and scored zero goals. Subsequently, he signed for Italian side Lecce in 2025.

== International career ==
Scott is a Germany and United States youth international. On 15 November 2023, he debuted for the Germany under-18 national team during a 2–1 away friendly loss to the Czech Republic.
