= Matías Pérez (footballer, born 2005) =

Chilean footballer (born 2005

Personal information
- Full name: Matías Ignacio Pérez Sepúlveda
- Date of birth: 13 April 2005 (age 21)
- Place of birth: Molina, Chile
- Height: 1.92 m (6 ft 4 in)
- Position: Centre-back

Team information
- Current team: Deportes La Serena (on loan from Lecce)

Youth career
- Curicó Unido

Senior career*
Years	Team	Apps	(Gls)
2024–2025	Curicó Unido	17	(0)
2025–	Lecce	1	(0)
2026–	→ Deportes La Serena (loan)	0	(0)

International career^{‡}
2024–2025	Chile U20	11	(0)
- * Club domestic league appearances and goals as of 4 January 2026 ‡ National team caps and goals as of 2 October 2025

Matías Ignacio Pérez Sepúlveda (born 13 April 2005) is a Chilean professional footballer who plays as a centre-back for Liga de Primera club Deportes La Serena, on loan from Serie A club Lecce.

== Early life ==
Pérez was born on 13 April 2005 in Molina, Chile. A native of the city, he is the son of a metalworker father.

== Club career ==
At the age of thirteen, he joined the youth academy of Chilean side Curicó Unido and was promoted to the club's senior team ahead of the 2024 season, where he made seventeen league appearances and scored zero goals. Following his stint there, he signed for Serie A side Lecce in 2025.

In August 2026, Pérez was sent on loan to Liga de Primera club Deportes La Serena.

== International career ==
Pérez is a Chile youth international. During January and February 2025, he played for the Chile national under-20 football team at the 2025 South American U-20 Championship. Included in the final squad for the 2025 FIFA U20 World Cup, he suffered a serious pulled hamstring in the second match against Japan.

== Style of play ==
Pérez plays as a defender and is right-footed. Italian news website Calciomercato.com wrote in 2025 that he "combines great physical strength with delicate feet. Standing 190 cm tall, he's a strong header and tackling specialist, but also has excellent dribbling skills. His ability with the ball at his feet combined with considerable speed meant that, in his short career, he was also used on the wing".
