= Lassana Coulibaly =

Malian footballer (born 1996)

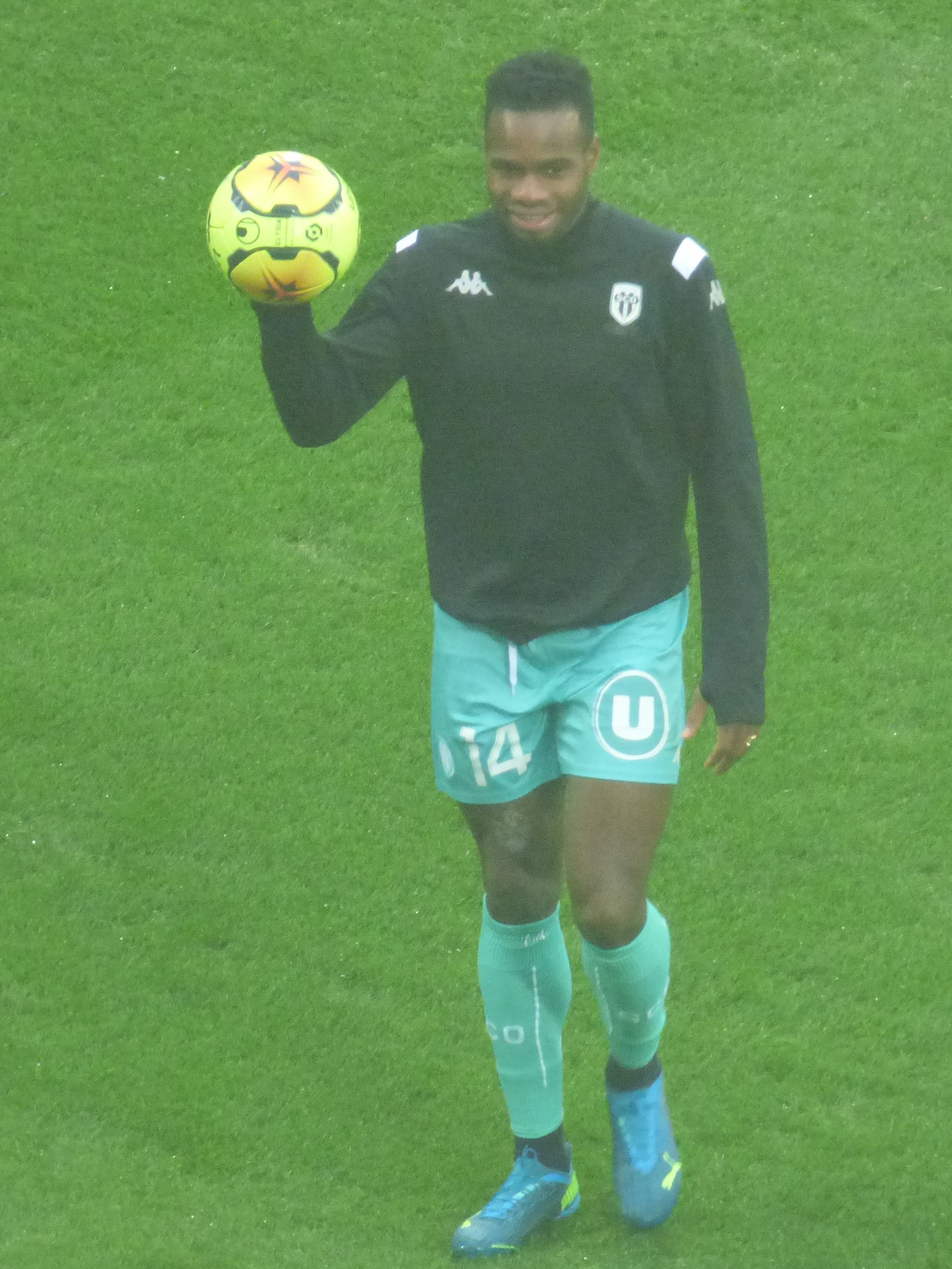
- Coulibaly warming up for Angers in 2020

Personal information
- Date of birth: 10 April 1996 (age 30)
- Place of birth: Bamako, Mali
- Height: 1.83 m (6 ft 0 in)
- Position: Central midfielder

Team information
- Current team: Lecce
- Number: 29

Youth career
- 2009-2015: Bastia

Senior career*
Years	Team	Apps	(Gls)
2015–2017	Bastia	44	(1)
2017–2021	Angers	49	(2)
2018–2019	→ Rangers (loan)	19	(1)
2019–2020	→ Cercle Brugge (loan)	16	(0)
2021–2024	Salernitana	94	(4)
2024–	Lecce	76	(6)

International career^{‡}
2016	Mali U20	1	(0)
2016–	Mali	61	(2)
- * Club domestic league appearances and goals as of 18:15, 21 September 2026 (UTC) ‡ National team caps and goals as of 21:04, 4 October 2026 (UTC)

Lassana Coulibaly (born 10 April 1996) is a Malian professional footballer who plays as a central midfielder for Serie A club Lecce and the Mali national team.

== Club career ==
Coulibaly is a youth product from Bastia. He made his Ligue 1 debut on 8 August 2015 against Rennes. He replaced François Kamano during stoppage time in a 2–1 home win. Two weeks later, he scored his first league goal against Guingamp.

On 10 July 2018, Coulibaly joined Scottish Premiership side Rangers on a season-long loan from Angers.

On 14 August 2024, Coulibaly signed a three-year contract with Lecce.

== International career ==
Coulibaly was called up to the Mali U20 national team for the 2016 Toulon Tournament, and made his debut in a 1–0 loss to the Czech Republic U20s. He made his debut for the senior Mali national team in a 5–2 2017 Africa Cup of Nations qualification win over Benin on 4 September 2016.

Subsequently, on 8 October 2016, he played a match against Ivory Coast counting for the 2018 FIFA World Cup qualification (defeat 3-1).

He competes for his first international competition at the 2017 Africa Cup of Nations in Gabon.

Two years later, he was summoned again to participate in the 2019 Africa Cup of Nations.

In December 2021, Coulibaly was selected by coach Mohamed Magassouba to participate in the 2021 Africa Cup of Nations.

On 2 January 2024 he was selected from the list of 27 Malian players selected by Éric Chelle to compete in the 2023 Africa Cup of Nations.

On 11 December 2025, Coulibaly was called up to the Mali squad for the 2025 Africa Cup of Nations.

== Career statistics ==
=== Club ===
As of match played 20 September 2026

Appearances and goals by club, season and competition
Club	Season	League			National cup		League cup		Europe		Other		Total	
Club	Season	Division	Apps	Goals	Apps	Goals	Apps	Goals	Apps	Goals	Apps	Goals	Apps	Goals
Bastia II	2014–15	CFA 2	6	0	—		—		—		—		6	0
Bastia II	2015–16	CFA 2	8	0	—		—		—		—		8	0
Bastia II	Total		14	0	0	0	0	0	0	0	0	0	14	0
Bastia	2015–16	Ligue 1	15	1	2	0	1	0	—		—		18	1
Bastia	2016–17	Ligue 1	30	0	0	0	1	0	—		—		31	0
Bastia	Total		45	1	2	0	1	0	0	0	0	0	49	1
Angers	2017–18	Ligue 1	19	1	0	0	3	0	—		—		22	1
Angers	2020–21	Ligue 1	29	1	2	0	—		—		—		31	1
Angers	Total		48	2	2	0	3	0	0	0	0	0	53	2
Rangers (loan)	2018–19	Scottish Premiership	19	1	1	1	1	0	9 (Note: Appearances in UEFA Europa League)	1	—		30	3
Cercle Brugge (loan)	2019–20	Belgian Pro League	16	0	1	0	—		—		—		17	0
Angers II	2019–20	CFA 2	1	0	—		—		—		—		1	0
Salernitana	2021–22	Serie A	31	0	2	0	—		—		—		33	0
Salernitana	2022–23	Serie A	35	3	1	0	—		—		—		36	3
Salernitana	2023–24	Serie A	28	1	1	0	—		—		—		29	1
Salernitana	Total		94	4	4	0	0	0	0	0	0	0	98	4
Lecce	2024–25	Serie A	38	1	0	0	—		—		—		38	1
Lecce	2025–26	Serie A	33	3	2	0	—		—		—		35	3
Lecce	2026–27	Serie A	5	2	1	0	—		—		—		6	2
Lecce	Total		76	6	3	0	0	0	0	0	0	0	79	6
Career total			313	14	13	1	6	0	9	1	0	0	341	16

=== International ===
As of matches played 4 October 2026

Appearances and goals by national team and year
National team	Year	Apps	Goals
Mali	2016	3	0
Mali	2017	5	0
Mali	2018	3	0
Mali	2019	10	0
Mali	2020	3	0
Mali	2021	3	0
Mali	2022	4	0
Mali	2023	2	0
Mali	2024	12	1
Mali	2025	9	1
Mali	2026	6	0
Total		61	2

=== International goals ===
List of international goals scored by Lassana Coulibaly
No.	Date	Venue	Opponent	Score	Result	Competition	Ref.
1	6 January 2024	Stade du 26 Mars, Bamako, Mali	Guinea-Bissau	2–0	6–2	Friendly	
2	4 September 2025	Berkane Municipal Stadium, Berkane, Morocco	Cameroon	3–0	3–0	2026 FIFA World Cup qualification	
