= Danilo Veiga =

Portuguese footballer (born 2002)

Personal information
- Full name: Danilo Filipe de Melo Veiga
- Date of birth: 25 September 2002 (age 24)
- Place of birth: Gondomar, Portugal
- Height: 1.83 m (6 ft 0 in)
- Position: Right-back

Team information
- Current team: Lecce
- Number: 17

Youth career
- 2010–2013: Estrelas de Fânzeres
- 2013–2014: Salgueiros
- 2014–2020: Porto
- 2020–2021: Paços de Ferreira

Senior career*
| Years | Team | Apps | (Gls) |
| 2021–2022 | Felgueiras | 12 | (0) |
| 2022–2023 | Gil Vicente | 9 | (0) |
| 2023–2024 | Rijeka | 28 | (0) |
| 2024–2025 | Estrela da Amadora | 15 | (0) |
| 2025– | Lecce | 49 | (0) |

International career
| 2024– | Portugal U21 | 0 | (0) |
- * Club domestic league appearances and goals as of 25 May 2026

Danilo Filipe de Melo Veiga (born 25 September 2002) is a Portuguese professional footballer who plays as a right-back for Serie A club Lecce.

== Club career ==
Veiga is a youth product of Estrelas de Fânzeres, Salgueiros, Porto and Paços de Ferreira. He began his senior career with Felgueiras in the Liga 3 in the 2021-22 season. On 25 May 2022, he transferred to the Primeira Liga side Gil Vicente. He made his professional debut with Gil Vicente in a 1–1 UEFA Europa League tie with Riga FC on 3 August 2022.

On 28 January 2025, Veiga signed a two-and-a-half-year contract with Lecce in Italy.

== Personal life ==
Born in Portugal, Veiga is of Brazilian descent.

== Career statistics ==
=== Club ===
As of match played 16 February 2026

Appearances and goals by club, season and competition
| Club | Season | League | | | Cup | | Europe | | Other | | Total | |
| Club | Season | Division | Apps | Goals | Apps | Goals | Apps | Goals | Apps | Goals | Apps | Goals |
|---|---|---|---|---|---|---|---|---|---|---|---|---|
| Felgueiras | 2021–22 | Liga 3 | 12 | 0 | 3 | 0 | — | | — | | 15 | 0 |
| Gil Vicente | 2022–23 | Primeira Liga | 9 | 0 | 2 | 0 | 3 (Note: Appearances in UEFA Europa Conference League) | 0 | — | | 14 | 0 |
| Rijeka | 2022–23 | HNL | 17 | 0 | 0 | 0 | — | | — | | 17 | 0 |
| Rijeka | 2023–24 | HNL | 11 | 0 | 4 | 1 | 4 (Note: Appearances in UEFA Europa League) | 0 | — | | 19 | 1 |
| Rijeka | Total | | 28 | 0 | 4 | 1 | 4 | 0 | 0 | 0 | 36 | 1 |
| Estrela da Amadora | 2024–25 | Primeira Liga | 15 | 0 | 1 | 0 | — | | — | | 16 | 0 |
| Lecce | 2024–25 | Serie A | 13 | 0 | 0 | 0 | — | | — | | 13 | 0 |
| Lecce | 2025–26 | Serie A | 23 | 0 | 2 | 0 | — | | — | | 25 | 0 |
| Lecce | Total | | 36 | 0 | 2 | 0 | 0 | 0 | 0 | 0 | 38 | 0 |
| Career total | | | 100 | 0 | 12 | 1 | 7 | 0 | 0 | 0 | 119 | 1 |
