= Henri Salomaa =

Finnish footballer (born 2003)

Personal information
- Full name: Henri Valentin Salomaa
- Date of birth: 14 February 2003 (age 23)
- Place of birth: Finland
- Height: 1.84 m (6 ft 0 in)
- Position: Winger

Team information
- Current team: VPS
- Number: 25

Youth career
- –2020: HJK
- 2021–2024: Lecce

Senior career*
Years	Team	Apps	(Gls)
2020–2021	Klubi 04	12	(1)
2021–2026	Lecce	0	(0)
2024	→ Lecco (loan)	3	(0)
2024–2025	→ Casertana (loan)	9	(0)
2025	→ Lucchese (loan)	5	(0)
2026	Inter Turku	11	(0)
2026–	VPS	10	(0)

International career^{‡}
2018–2019	Finland U16	5	(0)
2019–2020	Finland U17	11	(2)
2021	Finland U19	4	(3)
2023–2024	Finland U21	10	(1)
- * Club domestic league appearances and goals as of 13 November 2026 ‡ National team caps and goals as of 10 September 2024

Henri Valentin Salomaa (born 14 February 2003) is a Finnish professional footballer who plays as a winger for Veikkausliiga club VPS.

== Club career ==
=== HJK Helsinki ===
Salomaa started to play football in the youth sector of HJK Helsinki. He made his senior debut with the club's reserve team Klubi 04 in 2020, playing in the third-tier league Kakkonen. At the end of the season, the team won Kakkonen Group B, and earned the promotion to Ykkönen. Next season he made five appearances in the Finnish second-tier, before leaving the club in the summer 2021.

=== Lecce and loans ===
In July 2021, Salomaa moved to Italy and signed with Lecce for an undisclosed fee. He was initially registered to the club's under-19 youth squad playing in Primavera. In June 2023, Salomaa won the Primavera 1 championship title with Lecce U19, contributing in a total of 32 matches, scoring five goals and providing seven assists.

On 5 January 2024, Salomaa was loaned out to Serie B side Lecco for the rest of the 2023–24 season, with a deal including an option-to-buy.

On 21 August 2024, Salomaa joined Serie C club Casertana on a season-long loan deal.

In January 2025, Salomaa joined Lucchese in Serie C on a loan deal.

=== Inter Turku ===
On 23 January 2026, Salomaa signed a two-season contract with Inter Turku back in Finland.

== International career ==
Salomaa has represented Finland at various youth international levels. Since 2023, he has been part of the Finland under-21 national team.

== Career statistics ==
As of 13 November 2026

Appearances and goals by club, season and competition
Club	Season	League			Cup (Note: Includes Suomen Cup)		Europe		Other		Total	
Club	Season	Division	Apps	Goals	Apps	Goals	Apps	Goals	Apps	Goals	Apps	Goals
Klubi 04	2020	Kakkonen	7	1	–		–		–		7	1
Klubi 04	2021	Ykkönen	5	0	2	0	–		–		7	0
Klubi 04	Total		12	1	2	0	0	0	0	0	14	1
Lecce	2023–24	Serie A	0	0	0	0	–		–		0	0
Lecco (loan)	2023–24	Serie B	3	0	–		–		–		3	0
Casertana (loan)	2024–25	Serie C	9	0	0	0	–		–		9	0
Lucchese (loan)	2024–25	Serie C	5	0	0	0	–		–		5	0
Inter Turku	2026	Veikkausliiga	11	0	3	1	1 (Note: Appearance UEFA Europa Conference League)	0	3	0	18	1
VPS	2026	Veikkausliiga	10	0	0	0	–		–		10	0
Career total			50	1	5	1	1	0	3	0	59	2

== Honours ==
Klubi 04

- Kakkonen Group B: 2020

Lecce U19

- Primavera: 2022–23
