= Eetu Mömmö =

Finnish footballer (born 2002)

Personal information
- Date of birth: 4 May 2002 (age 24)
- Height: 1.83 m (6 ft 0 in)
- Positions: Forward; left winger

Team information
- Current team: SJK
- Number: 15

Youth career
- Ilves
- 2021–2023: Lecce

Senior career*
Years	Team	Apps	(Gls)
2019–2021	Ilves	31	(5)
2019–2021	→ Ilves II	23	(9)
2022–2026	Lecce	0	(0)
2023	→ FH (loan)	11	(1)
2024	→ SJK (loan)	23	(0)
2025	→ Haka (loan)	24	(2)
2026–	SJK	17	(1)

International career^{‡}
2018–2019	Finland U17	10	(2)
2021–2023	Finland U21	14	(2)
- * Club domestic league appearances and goals as of 13 November 2026 ‡ National team caps and goals as of 16 November 2023

Eetu Mömmö (born 4 May 2002) is a Finnish professional footballer who plays as a forward or left winger for Veikkausliiga club SJK.

== Club career ==
On 19 August 2021, Mömmö signed with Italian club Lecce and was assigned to their Under-19 squad.

On 9 February 2024, after a loan stint in Iceland with FH, Mömmö returned to Finland and joined SJK on loan for the 2024 season, with an option to buy.

On 20 January 2026, Mömmö returned to SJK on a two-year contract.

== Career statistics ==
As of 13 November 2026

Appearances and goals by club, season and competition
Club	Season	League			Cup (Note: Includes Finnish Cup and Icelandic Cup)		League cup (Note: Includes Icelandic League Cup and Finnish League Cup)		Continental		Total	
Club	Season	Division	Apps	Goals	Apps	Goals	Apps	Goals	Apps	Goals	Apps	Goals
Ilves II	2019	Kakkonen	19	5	–		–		–		19	5
Ilves II	2020	Kakkonen	4	4	–		–		–		4	4
Ilves II	Total		23	9	0	0	0	0	0	0	23	9
Ilves	2019	Veikkausliiga	1	0	0	0	–		–		1	0
Ilves	2020	Veikkausliiga	18	1	7	2	–		1 (Note: Appearance in the UEFA Europa League)	0	26	3
Ilves	2021	Veikkausliiga	13	4	2	0	–		–		15	4
Ilves	Total		32	5	9	2	0	0	1	0	42	7
Lecce	2022–23	Serie A	0	0	0	0	–		–		0	0
FH (loan)	2023	Besta deild karla	11	1	1	0	2	0	–		14	1
SJK (loan)	2024	Veikkausliiga	23	0	3	0	2	0	–		28	0
Haka (loan)	2025	Veikkausliiga	24	2	4	0	2	0	–		30	2
SJK	2026	Veikkausliiga	17	1	1	0	5	0	–		23	1
Career total			117	14	16	2	11	0	1	0	145	16
