= Gaby Jean =

French footballer (born 2000)

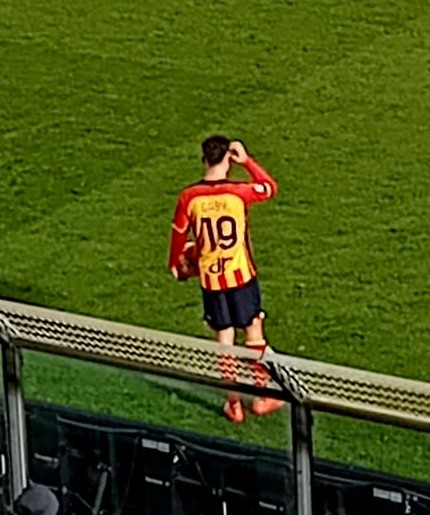
- Jean with US Lecce in 2024

Personal information
- Date of birth: 19 February 2000 (age 26)
- Place of birth: Mâcon, France
- Height: 1.91 m (6 ft 3 in)
- Position: Centre-back

Team information
- Current team: Lecce
- Number: 18

Youth career
- Dijon
- Montceau

Senior career*
Years	Team	Apps	(Gls)
2019–2020	Montceau	14	(1)
2020–2022	Louhans-Cuiseaux	24	(3)
2022–2024	Annecy	77	(2)
2024–	Lecce	26	(0)
- * Club domestic league appearances and goals as of 25 May 2026

Gaby Jean (born 19 February 2000) is a French professional footballer who plays as a centre-back for Serie A club Lecce.

== Career ==
Jean is a youth product of the academies of Dijon and Montceau. He began his senior career with Montceau in the Championnat National 3 in 2019, and moved to Louhans-Cuiseaux in 2020. He transferred to the newly promoted Ligue 2 club Annecy on 20 July 2022. He made his professional debut with Annecy in a 2–1 Ligue 2 loss to Niort on 30 July 2022.

On 26 August 2024, Jean signed a contract with Lecce in Italy for three seasons, with an option for two more.
