= Lameck Banda =

Zambian footballer (born 2001)

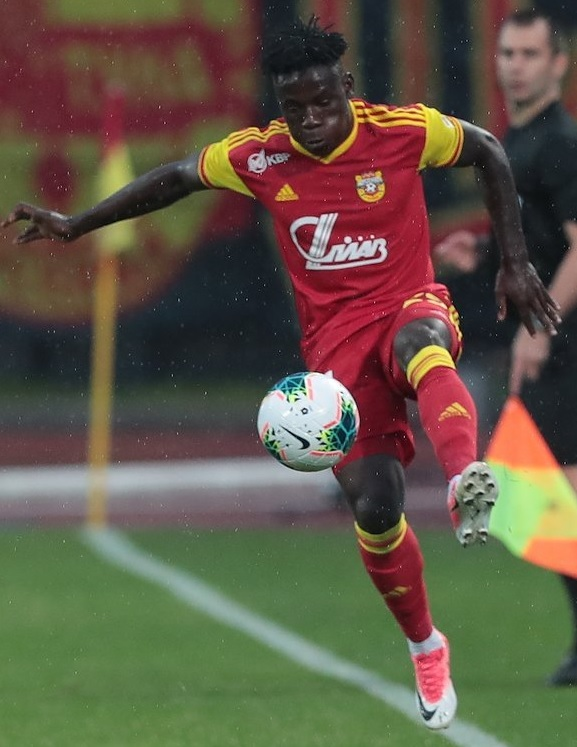
- Banda with Arsenal Tula in 2019

Personal information
- Date of birth: 29 January 2001 (age 25)
- Place of birth: Lusaka, Zambia
- Height: 1.69 m (5 ft 7 in)
- Position: Left winger

Senior career*
Years	Team	Apps	(Gls)
2017–2018	Nkwazi		
2018–2019	ZESCO United		(4)
2019–2022	Arsenal Tula	11	(0)
2020–2021	→ Maccabi Netanya (loan)	24	(2)
2021–2022	→ Maccabi Petah Tikva (loan)	33	(8)
2022–2026	Lecce	103	(9)

International career^{‡}
- Zambia U17
- Zambia U20
2019	Zambia U23	3	(0)
2022–	Zambia	20	(3)
- * Club domestic league appearances and goals as of 22 August 2026 ‡ National team caps and goals as of 04:13, 22 November 2025 (UTC)

Lameck Banda known as Pippi (born 29 January 2001) is a Zambian professional footballer who plays as a left winger for the Zambia national team.

== Club career ==
On 10 July 2019, Banda signed a contract with Russian Premier League club FC Arsenal Tula. He joined his compatriots Evans Kangwa and Kings Kangwa at the club.

He made his debut in the Russian Premier League for Arsenal Tula on 12 July 2019 in a season-opening game against FC Dynamo Moscow, as a starter.

On 3 September 2020, Banda signed with Maccabi Netanya. On 7 September 2020, Arsenal Tula confirmed the transfer and announced that it is a loan until May 2021. On 6 August 2021, he returned to Israel, joining Maccabi Petah Tikva on a season-long loan with an option to buy.

On 4 August 2022, Banda joined newly promoted Serie A club U.S. Lecce on a permanent deal, signing a four-year deal with an option for a fifth season. He then made his debut for the Italian club on 13 August, coming on as a substitute for Federico de Francesco in the 74th minute of a 2–1 league loss against Inter Milan. By doing so, he became the first Zambian player to ever feature in a Serie A match.

On 4 January 2023, Banda was racially abused, together with his team-mate Samuel Umtiti, by a group of away supporters during a home league game against Lazio. The Lazio fans involved kept targeting the two players with racist chants throughout most part of the match, with referee Livio Martinelli being forced to interrupt the game for a few minutes during the second half – although the Zambian player had already been substituted at half time. The game eventually ended in a 2–1 win for Lecce. The club's president himself, Saverio Sticchi Damiani, defended both the abused players in the post-match. Lazio apologised for the behaviour of their supporters by issuing an official statement on social media, while FIFA president Gianni Infantino showed support to Umtiti and Banda through a message on his Instagram profile.

In June 2026, Lecce advanced Banda a portion of his salary to cover his wedding expenses. Despite this, the player failed to report to the pre-season medical tests on 13 July and the subsequent training camp in Austria, remaining unreachable for weeks. The club heavily penalized his unprofessional behavior with disciplinary actions and a salary suspension. In August, it emerged that Banda was in Libya negotiating with Al-Swehli SC, who requested his transfer claiming he was a free agent. Lecce contested the move, proving the validity of a contract extension until 2027 signed in May. On 11 August 2026, the FIGC ruled in favor of the Italian club, blocking the transfer, while the dispute was referred to FIFA.

== International career ==
Banda has been capped by Zambia at the under-17, under-20 and under-23 levels. He debuted for the senior Zambia national team in a friendly 3–1 win over the Congo on 25 March 2022.

In December 2023, he was included in the squad of twenty-seven Zambian players selected by Avram Grant to compete in the 2023 Africa Cup of Nations.

On 10 December 2025, Banda was called up to the Zambia squad for the 2025 Africa Cup of Nations.

== Career statistics ==
Scores and results list Zambia's goal tally first, score column indicates score after each Banda goal.

List of international goals scored by Lameck Banda
No.	Date	Venue	Opponent	Score	Result	Competition
1	23 March 2023	Levy Mwanawasa Stadium, Ndola, Zambia	Lesotho	2–1	3–1	2023 Africa Cup of Nations qualification
2	23 March 2023	Levy Mwanawasa Stadium, Ndola, Zambia	Lesotho	3–1	3–1	2023 Africa Cup of Nations qualification
3	17 November 2023	Levy Mwanawasa Stadium, Ndola, Zambia	Congo	2–2	4–2	2026 FIFA World Cup qualification
