= 2020–21 US Lecce season =

Lecce
2020–21 season
- President: Saverio Sticchi Damiani
- Head coach: Eugenio Corini
- Stadium: Stadio Via del Mare
- Serie B: 4th
- Coppa Italia: Third round
- Top goalscorer: League: Massimo Coda (22); All: Massimo Coda (22)
Home colours	Away colours

The 2020–21 season is Unione Sportiva Lecce's first season back in Serie B since being promoted at the end of the 2017–18 Serie C season. During this season the club are competing in the Serie B and the Coppa Italia.

== Players ==
=== Current squad ===
As of 4 February 2021.

Note: Flags indicate national team as defined under FIFA eligibility rules; some limited exceptions apply. Players may hold more than one non-FIFA nationality.

No.	Pos.	Nation	Player
1	GK	ITA	Marco Bleve
2	DF	ITA	Christian Maggio
4	DF	ITA	Fabio Pisacane
5	DF	ITA	Fabio Lucioni
6	DF	ITA	Biagio Meccariello
7	FW	ITA	Luca Paganini
8	MF	ITA	Marco Mancosu (captain)
9	FW	ITA	Massimo Coda
10	FW	TUR	Güven Yalçın (on loan from Beşiktaş)
11	DF	ITA	Claud Adjapong (on loan from Sassuolo)
12	GK	ROU	Alexandru Borbei
14	FW	POL	Mariusz Stępiński (on loan from Verona)
15	DF	ITA	Ilario Monterisi
16	MF	MKD	Boban Nikolov
17	DF	ALB	Kastriot Dermaku (on loan from Parma)

No.	Pos.	Nation	Player
18	MF	ROU	David Stefan
19	MF	POL	Marcin Listkowski
20	FW	ITA	Stefano Pettinari
21	GK	BRA	Gabriel
22	GK	ITA	Mauro Vigorito
23	MF	SWE	John Björkengren
24	DF	MKD	Leonard Zuta
25	DF	ITA	Antonino Gallo
27	DF	ITA	Marco Calderoni
34	MF	ITA	Sergio Maselli
37	MF	SLO	Žan Majer
42	MF	DEN	Morten Hjulmand
53	MF	SCO	Liam Henderson
75	FW	ITA	Mattia Felici
77	MF	GRE	Panagiotis Tachtsidis
99	FW	ESP	Pablo Rodríguez

=== Out on loan ===
Note: Flags indicate national team as defined under FIFA eligibility rules; some limited exceptions apply. Players may hold more than one non-FIFA nationality.

No.	Pos.	Nation	Player
—	GK	CAN	Joakim Milli (at Nardò until 30 June 2021)
—	GK	ITA	Filippo Petrarca (at Fidelis Andria until 30 June 2021)
—	DF	ROU	Romario Benzar (at Viitorul Constanța until 30 June 2021)
—	DF	ITA	Niccolò Dario (at Bitonto until 30 June 2021)
—	DF	ITA	Riccardo Fiamozzi (at Empoli until 30 June 2021)
—	DF	ITA	Davide Riccardi (at Catanzaro until 30 June 2021)

No.	Pos.	Nation	Player
—	DF	COL	Brayan Vera (at Cosenza until 30 June 2021)
—	DF	ITA	Roberto Pierno (at Catanzaro until 30 June 2021)
—	MF	ITA	Francesco Palumbo (at Brindisi until 30 June 2021)
—	FW	LTU	Edgaras Dubickas (at Livorno until 30 June 2021)
—	FW	ITA	Gabriele Gallo (at Nardò until 30 June 2021)

== Pre-season and friendlies ==
12 September 2020 Friendly	Lecce	2–2	Monopoli	Lecce
18:00 CEST		Report		Stadium: Stadio Via del Mare

19 September 2020 Friendly	Lecce	2–0	Nardò	Lecce
14:00 CEST		Report		Stadium: Stadio Via del Mare

19 September 2020 Friendly	Lecce	3–0	Città di Fasano	Lecce
16:30 CEST		Report		Stadium: Stadio Via del Mare

== Competitions ==
=== Serie B ===
==== League table ====
Pos	Team	Pld	W	D	L	GF	GA	GD	Pts	Promotion, qualification or relegation
2	Salernitana (P)	38	19	12	7	46	34	+12	69	Promotion to Serie A
3	Monza	38	17	13	8	51	33	+18	64	Qualification for promotion play-offs semi-finals
4	Lecce	38	16	14	8	68	47	+21	62	Qualification for promotion play-offs semi-finals
5	Venezia (O, P)	38	15	14	9	53	39	+14	59	Qualification for promotion play-offs preliminary round
6	Cittadella	38	15	12	11	48	35	+13	57	Qualification for promotion play-offs preliminary round

Source: Lega Serie B (in Italian), Soccerway (in English)
Rules for classification: 1) Points; 2) Head-to-head points; 3) Head-to-head goal difference; 4) Goal difference; 5) Goals scored; 6) Draw.
(O) Play-off winners; (P) Promoted

==== Results summary ====
Overall								Home						Away					
Pld	W	D	L	GF	GA	GD	Pts	W	D	L	GF	GA	GD	W	D	L	GF	GA	GD
38	16	14	8	68	47	+21	62	6	9	4	36	28	+8	10	5	4	32	19	+13

Last updated: 11 May 2021.
Source: Soccerway

==== Results by round ====
Round	1	2	3	4	5	6	7	8	9	10	11	12	13	14	15	16	17	18	19	20	21	22	23	24	25	26	27	28	29	30	31	32	33	34	35	36	37	38
Ground	H	A	A	H	A	H	A	H	A	H	H	A	H	A	H	A	H	A	H	A	H	H	A	H	A	H	A	H	A	A	H	A	H	A	H	A	H	A
Result	D	W	L	D	D	W	W	W	W	D	D	D	L	L	W	D	D	W	D	D	L	D	W	W	D	D	W	W	W	W	W	W	L	W	L	L	D	L
Position	12	5	9	8	9	8	5	3	2	3	4	5	7	8	7	6	6	6	7	7	7	8	8	7	6	6	5	4	3	2	2	2	2	2	2	4	4	4

Updated to match(es) played on 10 May 2021. Source: Serie B
A = Away; H = Home; W = Win; D = Draw; L = Loss

==== Matches ====
26 September 2020 1	Lecce	0–0	Pordenone	Lecce
14:00 CEST	Zuta (yellow card) 29'; Petriccione (yellow card) 57'; Calderoni (yellow card) 89'	Report	Falasco (yellow card) 33'; Vogliacco (yellow card) 90+1'	Stadium: Stadio Via del Mare; Attendance: 0 Referee: Antonio Giua

3 October 2020 2	Ascoli	0–2	Lecce	Ascoli Piceno
16:15 CEST	Corbo (yellow card) 87'	Report	Henderson (yellow card) 42', (goal) 66'; Mancosu 54'; Lucioni (yellow card) 62'	Stadium: Stadio Cino e Lillo Del Duca; Attendance: 0 Referee: Riccardo Ros

16 October 2020 3	Brescia	3–0	Lecce	Brescia
21:00 CEST	Ndoj 9', 67'; Špalek (yellow card) 19'; Martella (yellow card) 54'; Van de Looi (yellow card) 70'; Ayé 90'	Report	Calderoni (yellow card) 57'	Stadium: Stadio Mario Rigamonti; Attendance: 1,000; Referee: Antonio Di Martino

21 October 2020 4	Lecce	2–2	Cremonese	Lecce
19:00 CEST	Dermaku 47'; Coda 64'	Report	Terranova (yellow card) 12'; Gaetano 30'; Valzania 33'; Strizzolo (yellow card) 45'; Fiordaliso (yellow card) 54'; Gustafson (yellow card) 58'; Castagnetti (yellow card) 90'	Stadium: Stadio Via del Mare; Attendance: 614; Referee: Daniele Paterna

25 October 2020 5	Cosenza	1–1	Lecce	Cosenza
16:00 CET	Gliozzi 56'; Kone (yellow card) 65'; Bittante (yellow card) 82'; Bruccini (yellow card) 87'	Report	Coda 12'; Rossettini (red card) 41'	Stadium: Stadio San Vito-Gigi Marulla; Attendance: 390; Referee: Gianluca Aureliano

2 November 2020 6	Lecce	3–1	Pescara	Lecce
21:00 CET	Stępiński 13', 75'; Tachtsidis (yellow card) 25'; Coda 50'	Report	Fernandes (yellow card) 63'; Busellato (yellow card) 66'; Maistro 67'; Masciangelo (yellow card) 81'	Stadium: Stadio Via del Mare; Attendance: 0 Referee: Daniel Amabile

8 November 2020 7	Virtus Entella	1–5	Lecce	Chiavari
21:00 CET	Crimi (yellow card) 5'; Paolucci (yellow card) 20', (red card) 58'; De Luca 49'; Poli (yellow card) 57'	Report	Coda (yellow card) 12', (goal) 37'; Henderson 47'; Mancosu 58' (pen.); Paganini 66'; Calderoni (yellow card) 88'; Stępiński 90+3'	Stadium: Stadio Comunale; Attendance: 0 Referee: Antonio Rapuano

21 November 2020 8	Lecce	7–1	Reggiana	Lecce
14:00 CET	Coda 4', 20', 50'; Paganini (yellow card) 17'; Tachtsidis 37'; Falco 69', (yellow card) 86'; Majer 75'; Calderoni 84'	Report	Rozzio 58'; Varone (yellow card) 83'	Stadium: Stadio Via del Mare; Attendance: 0 Referee: Lorenzo Maggioni

27 November 2020 9	Chievo	1–2	Lecce	Verona
21:00 CET	Garritano 22'; Fabbro (yellow card) 29'; Cotali (yellow card) 36'	Report	Stępiński 20'; Henderson (yellow card) 32'; Calderoni (yellow card) 49'; Paganini (yellow card) 66'; Lucioni (yellow card) 77'; Falco 90+3'	Stadium: Stadio Marcantonio Bentegodi; Attendance: 0 Referee: Simone Sozza

5 December 2020 10	Lecce	2–2	Venezia	Lecce
14:00 CET	Mancosu 20'; Lucioni (yellow card) 52'; Coda 77'	Report	Modolo (yellow card) 16'; Forte 35', 41'; Johnsen (yellow card) 81' (yellow-red card) 90+5'	Stadium: Stadio Via del Mare; Attendance: 0 Referee: Eugenio Abbattista
Note: COVID-19 pandemic in Italy

12 December 2020 11	Lecce	2–2	Frosinone	Lecce
14:00 CET	Adjapong (yellow card) 14', (goal) 44'; Meccariello (yellow card) 50'; Mancosu 60'; Listkowski (yellow card) 82'; Tachtsidis (yellow card) 90+4'	Report	Parzyszek 15' (pen.); Kastanos (yellow card) 58'; Novakovich (yellow card) 88', (goal) 89'; Curado (yellow card) 90+1'	Stadium: Stadio Via del Mare; Attendance: 0 Referee: Davide Ghersini
Note: COVID-19 pandemic in Italy

15 December 2020 12	Salernitana	1–1	Lecce	Salerno
21:00 CET	Capezzi 11'; Dziczek (yellow card) 29'; Đurić (yellow card) 30'; Tutino (yellow card) 74'; Giannetti (yellow card) 90+6'	Report	Coda (yellow card) 29'; Mancosu 53' (pen.); Stępiński (yellow card) 90+1'	Stadium: Stadio Arechi; Attendance: 0 Referee: Daniele Chiffi
Note: COVID-19 pandemic in Italy

19 December 2020 13	Lecce	0–3	Pisa	Lecce
14:00 CET	Listkowski (yellow card) 28'	Report	Soddimo 2'; Marin (yellow card) 8'; Gucher 17'; Sibilli 68'	Stadium: Stadio Via del Mare; Attendance: 0 Referee: Juan Luca Sacchi
Note: COVID-19 pandemic in Italy

22 December 2020 14	SPAL	1–0	Lecce	Ferrara
19:00 CET	Tomović (yellow card) 40'; Valoti (yellow card) 43'; Espeto 79'	Report	Coda (yellow card) 46'; Lucioni (yellow card) 90'	Stadium: Stadio Paolo Mazza; Attendance: 0 Referee: Daniele Doveri
Note: COVID-19 pandemic in Italy

27 December 2020 15	Lecce	2–1	Vicenza	Lecce
15:00 CET	Mancosu 69'; Rodríguez (yellow card) 70', (goal) 72'	Report	Marotta 15'; Cappelletti (yellow card) 39'	Stadium: Stadio Via del Mare; Attendance: 0 Referee: Daniele Paterna
Note: COVID-19 pandemic in Italy

30 December 2020 16	Cittadella	2–2	Lecce	Cittadella
15:00 CET	Ogunseye 8'; Tavernelli 64'; Proia (yellow card) 70'	Report	Coda 18', 45'; Lucioni (yellow card) 25'; Björkengren (yellow card) 58'; Meccariello (yellow card) 85'	Stadium: Stadio Pier Cesare Tombolato; Attendance: 0 Referee: Marco Piccinini
Note: COVID-19 pandemic in Italy

4 January 2021 17	Lecce	0–0	Monza	Lecce
16:00 CET	Mancosu (yellow card) 6'; Tachtsidis (yellow card) 14'; Dermaku (yellow card) 90+1'	Report	Bettella (yellow card) 7'; Bellusci (red card) 90'	Stadium: Stadio Via del Mare; Attendance: 0 Referee: Livio Marinelli
Note: COVID-19 pandemic in Italy

16 January 2021 18	Reggina	0–1	Lecce	Reggio Calabria
16:00 CET	Šitum (yellow card) 70'	Report	Stępiński 28'; Coda (yellow card) 45+2' (yellow-red card) 67'; Henderson (yellow card) 54'; Tachtsidis (yellow card) 58'; Listkowski (yellow card) 63'; Gabriel (yellow card) 90+1'	Stadium: Stadio Oreste Granillo; Attendance: 0 Referee: Manuel Volpi
Note: COVID-19 pandemic in Italy

24 January 2021 19	Lecce	2–2	Empoli	Lecce
15:00 CET	Nikolov (yellow card) 5'; Tachtsidis (yellow card) 46'; Mancosu 79', (yellow card) 90+2'; Rodríguez 90'	Report	Haas 33', (yellow card) 66'; Parisi (yellow card) 41'; La Mantia 47'; Matos (yellow card) 90+3'	Stadium: Stadio Via del Mare; Attendance: 0 Referee: Fabrizio Pasqua
Note: COVID-19 pandemic in Italy

30 January 2021 20	Pordenone	1–1	Lecce	Lignano Sabbiadoro
14:00 CET	Scavone (yellow card) 6'; Falasco (yellow card) 17'; Musiolik 20'; Misuraca (yellow card) 58'; Barison (yellow card) 62'; Vogliacco (yellow card) 85'	Report	Coda 14'; Hjulmand (yellow card) 34'; Nikolov (yellow card) 54'; Henderson (yellow card) 85'; Björkengren (yellow card) 90+2'	Stadium: Stadio Guido Teghil; Attendance: 0 Referee: Davide Massa
Note: COVID-19 pandemic in Italy

5 February 2021 21	Lecce	1–2	Ascoli	Lecce
21:00 CET	Pisacane (yellow card) 9'; Tachtsidis (yellow card) 17'; Stępiński 23'; Meccariello (yellow card) 53'; Rodríguez (yellow card) 90+2'	Report	Sabiri (yellow card) 27'; Dionisi 28', 56'; Šarić (yellow card) 85'; Caligara (yellow card) 85'; Leali (yellow card) 90'; Parigini (yellow card) 90+2'	Stadium: Stadio Via del Mare; Attendance: 0 Referee: Matteo Marchetti
Note: COVID-19 pandemic in Italy

9 February 2021 22	Lecce	2–2	Brescia	Lecce
19:00 CET	Rodríguez 46'; Björkengren 58'; Hjulmand (yellow card) 81'	Report	Chancellor (yellow card) 57'; Bisoli 75'; Ayé 90+3'	Stadium: Stadio Via del Mare; Attendance: 0 Referee: Giampaolo Calvarese
Note: COVID-19 pandemic in Italy

13 February 2021 23	Cremonese	1–2	Lecce	Cremona
14:00 CET	Gaetano 7'; Ravanelli (yellow card) 29' (yellow-red card) 90+2'	Report	Castagnetti 29' (pen.); Hjulmand (yellow card) 52'; Rodríguez 54'; Lucioni (yellow card) 59'; Nikolov (yellow card) 81'	Stadium: Stadio Giovanni Zini; Attendance: 0 Referee: Marco Guida
Note: COVID-19 pandemic in Italy

21 February 2021 24	Lecce	3–1	Cosenza	Lecce
21:00 CET	Coda 12' (pen.), (yellow card) 59'; Hjulmand (yellow card) 15'; Mancosu 77' (pen.); Meccariello 84'	Report	Gliozzi 8'; Legittimo (yellow card) 11'; Ingrosso (yellow card) 84'	Stadium: Stadio Via del Mare; Attendance: 0 Referee: Antonio Giua
Note: COVID-19 pandemic in Italy

27 February 2021 25	Pescara	1–1	Lecce	Pescara
14:00 CET	Masciangelo (yellow card) 26'; Busellato 90+1'	Report	Maggio 38'; Mancosu (yellow card) 81'	Stadium: Stadio Adriatico – Giovanni Cornacchia; Attendance: 0 Referee: Ivan Robilotta
Note: COVID-19 pandemic in Italy

2 March 2021 26	Lecce	0–0	Virtus Entella	Lecce
19:00 CET	Yalçın (yellow card) 73'; Stępiński (yellow card) 77'; Majer (yellow card) 90+6'	Report	Paolucci (yellow card) 52'; De Col (yellow card) 70'; Pellizzer (yellow card) 73'; Nizzetto (yellow card) 90+3'	Stadium: Stadio Via del Mare; Attendance: 0 Referee: Francesco Meraviglia
Note: COVID-19 pandemic in Italy

7 March 2021 27	Reggiana	0–4	Lecce	Reggio Emilia
21:00 CET	Varone (yellow card) 41'; Laribi (yellow card) 42'; Ajeti (yellow card) 47' (yellow-red card) 53'; Pezzella (yellow card) 79'	Report	Coda 15' (pen.), 32'; Majer 29'; Meccariello (yellow card) 69'; Stępiński 82' (pen.)	Stadium: Mapei Stadium – Città del Tricolore; Attendance: 0 Referee: Antonio Santoro
Note: COVID-19 pandemic in Italy

13 March 2021 28	Lecce	4–2	Chievo	Lecce
14:00 CET	Maggio 9', (yellow card) 52'; Coda 35', 38'; Majer (yellow card) 41'; Pettinari 42', (yellow card) 43'; Meccariello (yellow card) 54'; Nikolov (yellow card) 85'	Report	Obi (yellow card) 18', (goal) 22'; Mogoș 53'; De Luca (yellow card) 74'; Bertagnoli (yellow card) 79'	Stadium: Stadio Via del Mare; Attendance: 0 Referee: Gianluca Aureliano
Note: COVID-19 pandemic in Italy

16 March 2021 29	Venezia	2–3	Lecce	Venezia
19:00 CET	Lucioni 45+1' (o.g.); Maleh 57'; Di Mariano (yellow card) 60'; Svoboda (yellow card) 70'	Report	Pettinari 11'; Majer (yellow card) 40'; Coda 50', 71' (pen.); Lucioni (yellow card) 54'; Rodríguez (yellow card) 81'; Gallo (yellow card) 89'; Maggio (yellow card) 90+5'; Hjulmand (yellow card) 90+5'	Stadium: Stadio Pier Luigi Penzo; Attendance: 0 Referee: Giovanni Ayroldi
Note: COVID-19 pandemic in Italy

20 March 2021 30	Frosinone	0–3	Lecce	Frosinone
14:00 CET	Vitale (yellow card) 42'; Kastanos (yellow card) 55'	Report	Coda 53', 69'; Majer (yellow card) 65'; Rodríguez 85'	Stadium: Stadio Benito Stirpe; Attendance: 0 Referee: Federico Dionisi
Note: COVID-19 pandemic in Italy

2 April 2021 31	Lecce	2–0	Salernitana	Lecce
19:00 CEST	Pettinari 44'; Maggio 72'	Report	Bogdan (red card) 64'	Stadium: Stadio Via del Mare; Attendance: 0 Referee: (Italy) Daniele Chiffi
Note: COVID-19 pandemic in Italy

5 April 2021 32	Pisa	0–1	Lecce	Pisa
15:00 CEST	Mazzitelli (yellow card) 22'; Caracciolo (yellow card) 34'; Lisi (yellow card) 81'	Report	Pisacane (yellow card) 33'; Coda 76' (pen.); Tachtsidis (yellow card) 88'; Pablo Rodríguez (yellow card) 90'; Hjulmand (yellow card) 90+2'	Stadium: Arena Garibaldi; Attendance: 0 Referee: (Italy) Livio Marinelli
Note: COVID-19 pandemic in Italy

10 April 2021 33	Lecce	1–2	SPAL	Lecce
14:00 CEST	Majer 17'; Lucioni (yellow card) 44'; Hjulmand (yellow card) 57'; Nikolov (yellow card) 72'	Report	Serincola (yellow card) 1'; Valoti 13'; Viviani (yellow card) 32'; Okoli 54'; Mora (yellow card) 69'; Dickmann (yellow card) 78'	Stadium: Stadio Via del Mare; Attendance: 0 Referee: (Italy) Gianluca Manganiello
Note: COVID-19 pandemic in Italy

17 April 2021 34	Vicenza	1–2	Lecce	Vicenza
14:00 CEST	Rigoni (yellow card) 44'; Jallow 63'; Pasini (yellow card) 84'; Padella (yellow card) 90'	Report	Pettinari 50'; Henderson 67'; Maggio (yellow card) 72'	Stadium: Stadio Romeo Menti; Attendance: 0 Referee: (Italy) Antonio Giua
Note: COVID-19 pandemic in Italy

1 May 2021 35	Lecce	1–3	Cittadella	Lecce
14:00 CEST				Stadium: Stadio Via del Mare; Attendance: 0
Note: COVID-19 pandemic in Italy

4 May 2021 36	Monza	1–0	Lecce	Monza
14:00 CEST				Stadium: Stadio Brianteo; Attendance: 0
Note: COVID-19 pandemic in Italy

7 May 2021 37	Lecce	2–2	Reggina	Leece
14:00 CEST				Stadium: Stadio Via del Mare; Attendance: 0
Note: COVID-19 pandemic in Italy

10 May 2021 38	Empoli	2–1	Lecce	Empoli
14:00 CEST				Stadium: Stadio Carlo Castellani; Attendance: 0
Note: COVID-19 pandemic in Italy

=== Coppa Italia ===
30 September 2020 Second round	Lecce	2–0	Feralpisalò	Lecce
18:00 CEST	Henderson (yellow card) 36', (goal) 69'; Majer (yellow card) 54'; Dubickas 88'	Report	Carraro (yellow card) 43'; Petrucci (yellow card) 73'	Stadium: Stadio Via del Mare; Attendance: 0 Referee: Ivan Robilotta

28 October 2020 Third round	Torino	3–1 (a.e.t.)	Lecce	Turin
14:00 CEST	Lyanco 39'; Gojak (yellow card) 90+3'; Verdi 109' (pen.), 112'	Report	Stępiński 22'; Björkengren (yellow card) 65'; Henderson (yellow card) 90+2'; Maselli (yellow card) 105'; Lucioni (yellow card) 112'	Stadium: Stadio Olimpico Grande Torino; Attendance: 0 Referee: Marco Piccinini
