= 2022–23 US Lecce season =

U.S. Lecce
2022–23 season
- President: Saverio Sticchi Damiani
- Head coach: Marco Baroni
- Stadium: Stadio Via del mare
- Serie A: 16th
- Coppa Italia: Round of 64
- Top goalscorer: League: Gabriel Strefezza (8); All: Gabriel Strefezza (9)
Home colours	Away colours	Third colours

The 2022–23 season was the 96th season in the history of U.S. Lecce and the club's first season back in the top flight since 2020. The club participated in Serie A and the Coppa Italia.

== Players ==
=== First-team squad ===
As of 17 January 2023

Note: Flags indicate national team as defined under FIFA eligibility rules; some limited exceptions apply. Players may hold more than one non-FIFA nationality.

No.	Pos.	Nation	Player
1	GK	ITA	Marco Bleve
3	DF	ALB	Kastriot Dermaku
5	DF	CRO	Marin Pongračić (on loan from VfL Wolfsburg)
6	DF	ITA	Federico Baschirotto
7	MF	NOR	Kristoffer Askildsen (on loan from Sampdoria)
9	FW	ITA	Lorenzo Colombo (on loan from AC Milan)
11	FW	ITA	Federico Di Francesco
13	DF	ITA	Alessandro Tuia
14	MF	ISL	Þórir Jóhann Helgason
16	DF	ESP	Joan Gonzàlez
17	DF	FRA	Valentin Gendrey
19	FW	POL	Marcin Listkowski
20	MF	CZE	Daniel Samek
21	GK	ITA	Federico Brancolini
22	FW	ZAM	Lameck Banda
23	MF	SWE	John Björkengren

No.	Pos.	Nation	Player
25	DF	ITA	Antonino Gallo
27	MF	BRA	Gabriel Strefezza
28	MF	FRA	Rémi Oudin (on loan from Bordeaux)
29	MF	FRA	Alexis Blin
30	GK	ITA	Wladimiro Falcone (on loan from Sampdoria)
31	FW	SWE	Joel Voelkerling Persson
32	MF	MAR	Youssef Maleh (on loan from Fiorentina)
36	GK	FIN	Jasper Samooja
42	MF	DEN	Morten Hjulmand (captain)
77	FW	GAM	Assan Ceesay
80	MF	ALB	Medon Berisha
83	DF	BEL	Mats Lemmens
93	DF	FRA	Samuel Umtiti (on loan from Barcelona)
97	DF	ITA	Giuseppe Pezzella (on loan from Parma)
99	FW	ESP	Pablo Rodríguez
—	DF	ITA	Tommaso Cassandro

=== Out on loan ===
As of 17 January 2023

Note: Flags indicate national team as defined under FIFA eligibility rules; some limited exceptions apply. Players may hold more than one non-FIFA nationality.

No.	Pos.	Nation	Player
—	DF	ITA	Fabio Lucioni (at Frosinone until 30 June 2023)
—	DF	ITA	Ilario Monterisi (at Frosinone until 30 June 2023)

No.	Pos.	Nation	Player
—	DF	ITA	Roberto Pierno (at Virtus Francavilla until 30 June 2023)
—	MF	ITA	Alessio Piazza (at Messina until 30 June 2023)

== Transfers ==
=== In ===
No.	Pos.	Player	Transferred from	Fee	Date	Source
5	DF	(Croatia) Marin Pongračić	(Germany) VfL Wolfsburg	Loan	22 August 2022	
93	DF	(France) Samuel Umtiti	(Spain) Barcelona	Loan	25 August 2022	
28	MF	(France) Rémi Oudin	(France) Bordeaux	Loan	31 August 2022	
32	MF	(Morocco) Youssef Maleh	(Italy) Fiorentina	Loan	3 January 2023	
4	DF	(Italy) Simone Romagnoli	(Italy) Parma	Undisclosed	31 January 2023	

=== Out ===
Pos.	Player	Transferred to	Fee	Date	Source
MF	(Slovenia) Žan Majer	(Italy) Reggina	Free	31 July 2022	
MF	(Italy) Francesco Di Mariano	(Italy) Palermo	€1,000,000	16 August 2022	
DF	(Italy) Gianluca Frabotta	(Italy) Frosinone	Loan	1 September 2022	
FW	(Spain) Pablo Rodríguez	(Italy) Brescia	Loan	20 January 2023	

== Pre-season and friendlies ==
Win Draw Loss Fixtures

Lecce started training in Folgaria on 30 June.

5 July 2022 Friendly	Lecce (Italy)	14–1	(Italy) USD Postal Calcio	Folgaria, Italy
17:00 CEST (UTC+2)		Report		Stadium: Centro Sportivo Mauro Marzari

9 July 2022 Friendly	Rovereto (Italy)	0–7	(Italy) Lecce	Rovereto, Italy
17:00 CEST (UTC+2)

13 July 2022 Friendly	VfL Bochum (Germany)	3–2	(Italy) Lecce	Brixen, Italy
17:30 CEST (UTC+2)	Stöger 35'; Holtmann 44'; Ganvoula 64'		Colombo 14', 17'	Stadium: Sportplatz Klaus Seebacher

22 July 2022 Friendly	Virtus Francavilla (Italy)	0–1	(Italy) Lecce	Francavilla Fontana, Italy
21:00 CEST (UTC+2)			González 61'	Stadium: Stadio Giovanni Paolo II; Referee: Giorgio Vergaro

29 July 2022 Friendly	Parma (Italy)	1–0	(Italy) Lecce	Parma, Italy
20:30 CEST (UTC+2)	Mihăilă 50'			Stadium: Stadio Ennio Tardini; Attendance: 2,358; Referee: Alessandro Prontera

23 December 2022 Friendly	Udinese (Italy)	2–0	(Italy) Lecce
15:30 CET (UTC+1)

== Competitions ==
=== Overall record ===
Competition	First match	Last match	Starting round	Final position	Record							
Competition	First match	Last match	Starting round	Final position	Pld	W	D	L	GF	GA	GD	Win %
Serie A	13 August 2022	4 June 2023	Matchday 1	16th	38	8	12	18	33	46	−13	21.05
Coppa Italia	5 August 2022		Round of 64	Round of 64	1	0	0	1	2	3	−1	0.00
Total					39	8	12	19	35	49	−14	20.51

Source: Soccerway

=== Serie A ===
==== League table ====
Pos	Team	Pld	W	D	L	GF	GA	GD	Pts	Qualification or relegation
14	Empoli	38	10	13	15	37	49	−12	43	
15	Salernitana	38	9	15	14	48	62	−14	42	
16	Lecce	38	8	12	18	33	46	−13	36	
17	Spezia (R)	38	6	13	19	31	62	−31	31 (Note: Head-to-head points: Spezia 4 Hellas Verona 1)	Qualification for the Relegation tie-breaker (Note: Should the first and second, or 17th and 18th-placed teams at the end of the season be tied on points, a play-off tiebreaker match was held at a neutral site to determine the title and final team relegated respectively.)
18	Hellas Verona (O)	38	7	10	21	31	59	−28	31	Qualification for the Relegation tie-breaker

Source: Serie A
Rules for classification: 1) Points; 2) Tiebreaker for Champions team and third relegated team; 3) Head-to-head points; 4) Head-to-head goal difference; 5) Goal difference; 6) Goals scored; 7) Draw. (Note: Head-to-head record is used only after all the matches between the teams in question have been played)
(O) Play-off winners; (R) Relegated

==== Results summary ====
Overall								Home						Away					
Pld	W	D	L	GF	GA	GD	Pts	W	D	L	GF	GA	GD	W	D	L	GF	GA	GD
38	8	12	18	33	46	−13	36	3	8	8	18	24	−6	5	4	10	15	22	−7

Source: Serie A

==== Results by round ====
Round	1	2	3	4	5	6	7	8	9	10	11	12	13	14	15	16	17	18	19	20	21	22	23	24	25	26	27	28	29	30	31	32	33	34	35	36	37	38
Ground	H	A	H	A	A	H	A	H	A	H	A	H	A	H	A	H	A	H	A	H	A	H	A	H	A	H	A	A	H	H	A	H	A	H	A	H	A	H
Result	L	L	D	D	L	D	W	D	L	D	L	L	D	W	W	W	D	D	L	L	W	D	W	L	L	L	L	L	L	D	L	W	L	L	D	D	W	L
Position	12	19	15	15	17	17	15	13	16	16	17	17	16	16	16	12	11	14	14	15	14	13	13	15	15	15	15	16	16	16	16	16	16	16	16	16	16	16

Source: Serie A
A = Away; H = Home; W = Win; D = Draw; L = Loss

==== Matches ====
The league fixtures were announced on 24 June 2022.

13 August 2022 1	Lecce	1–2	Internazionale	Lecce
20:45 CEST (UTC+2)	Baschirotto (yellow card) 32'; Ceesay 48'; Blin (yellow card) 82'; Colombo (yellow card) 87'; Hjulmand (yellow card) 90+5'	Report	Lukaku 2'; Brozović (yellow card) 55'; Darmian (yellow card) 63'; Dumfries 90+5'	Stadium: Stadio Via del mare Attendance: 25,353; Referee: Alessandro Prontera

20 August 2022 2	Sassuolo	1–0	Lecce	Reggio Emilia
20:45 CEST (UTC+2)	Matheus Henrique (yellow card) 37'; Berardi 40', (yellow card) 55'; Rogério (yellow card) 66'; Frattesi (yellow card) 77'	Report	González (yellow card) 68'	Stadium: Mapei Stadium – Città del Tricolore; Attendance: 9,219; Referee: Andrea Colombo

28 August 2022 3	Lecce	1–1	Empoli	Lecce
20:45 CEST (UTC+2)	Banda (yellow card) 34'; Strefezza 40'	Report	Parisi 23'; Marin (yellow card) 27'; Stojanović (yellow card) 57'	Stadium: Stadio Via del mare Attendance: 23,941; Referee: Alberto Santoro

31 August 2022 4	Napoli	1–1	Lecce	Naples
20:45 CEST (UTC+2)	Politano (yellow card) 13'; Elmas 27'	Report	Colombo (penalty missed) 25', 31', (yellow card) 40'; Hjulmand (yellow card) 33'; Gendrey (yellow card) 90+7'; González (yellow card) 90+7'	Stadium: Stadio Diego Armando Maradona; Attendance: 37,573; Referee: Matteo Marcenaro

5 September 2022 5	Torino	1–0	Lecce	Turin
20:45 CEST (UTC+2)	Vlašić 40'; İlkhan (yellow card) 53'; Schuurs (yellow card) 56'	Report	Hjulmand (yellow card) 53'	Stadium: Stadio Olimpico Grande Torino; Attendance: 19,087; Referee: Manuel Volpi

11 September 2022 6	Lecce	1–1	Monza	Lecce
15:00 CEST (UTC+2)	Gendrey (yellow card) 45+3'; González 48'; Di Francesco (yellow card) 52'; Banda (yellow card) 83'	Report	Birindelli (yellow card) 29'; Sensi 35', (yellow card) 41'; Molina (yellow card) 90+5'	Stadium: Stadio Via del mare Attendance: 23,391; Referee: Luca Pairetto

16 September 2022 7	Salernitana	1–2	Lecce	Salerno
20:45 CEST (UTC+2)	Coulibaly (yellow card) 10'; Gonzàlez 55' (o.g.)	Report	Ceesay 43'; Di Francesco (yellow card) 47'; Gonzàlez (yellow card) 60'; Strefezza 83', (yellow card) 84'	Stadium: Stadio Arechi; Attendance: 19,488; Referee: Daniele Doveri

2 October 2022 8	Lecce	1–1	Cremonese	Lecce
15:00 CEST (UTC+2)	Falcone (yellow card) 18'; Strefezza 42' (pen.); Askildsen (yellow card) 53'; Pezzella (yellow card) 78'	Report	Ciofani 19' (pen.); Okereke (yellow card) 40'	Stadium: Stadio Via del mare Attendance: 23,377; Referee: Livio Marinelli

9 October 2022 9	Roma	2–1	Lecce	Rome
20:45 CEST (UTC+2)	Smalling 6'; Dybala 48' (pen.); Ibañez (yellow card) 60'; Mancini (yellow card) 62'	Report	Hjumland (red card) 23'; Strefezza 39'; Umtiti (yellow card) 57'	Stadium: Stadio Arechi; Attendance: 64,018; Referee: Alessandro Prontera

17 October 2022 10	Lecce	1–1	Fiorentina	Lecce
20:45 CEST (UTC+2)	Blin (yellow card) 40'; Ceesay 42'; Strefezza (yellow card) 58'; Umtiti (yellow card) 60'; Gallo (yellow card) 90+3' (yellow-red card) 90+5'	Report	Mandragora (yellow card) 15'; Kouamé (yellow card) 27', (goal) 48'; Terracciano (yellow card) 50'; Martínez Quarta (yellow card) 88'	Stadium: Stadio Via del mare Attendance: 24,925; Referee: Luca Massimi

23 October 2022 11	Bologna	2–0	Lecce	Bologna
15:00 CEST (UTC+2)	Arnautović 13' (pen.), (yellow card) 90+6'; Lucumí (yellow card) 30'; Ferguson 35', (yellow card) 47'; Barrow (yellow card) 45+2'; Medel (yellow card) 88'	Report	Hjulmand (yellow card) 65'; Baschirotto (yellow card) 90+6'	Stadium: Stadio Renato Dall'Ara; Attendance: 24,206; Referee: Simone Sozza

29 October 2022 12	Lecce	0–1	Juventus	Lecce
18:00 CEST (UTC+2)	Ceesay (yellow card) 59'; Pongračić (yellow card) 71'; Di Francesco (yellow card) 90+2'	Report	Miretti (yellow card) 13'; Cuadrado (yellow card) 17'; Milik (yellow card) 23'; Gatti (yellow card) 29'; Fagioli 73'; Iling-Junior (yellow card) 79'	Stadium: Stadio Via del mare Attendance: 25,860; Referee: Daniele Chiffi

4 November 2022 13	Udinese	1–1	Lecce	Udine
20:45 CET (UTC+1)	Deulofeu (yellow card) 37'; Bijol (yellow card) 45+1'; Beto 68'	Report	Colombo 33'; Umtiti (yellow card) 55'; Gendrey (yellow card) 69'; Oudin (yellow card) 87'	Stadium: Stadio Friuli; Attendance: 21,834; Referee: Francesco Fourneau

9 November 2022 14	Lecce	2–1	Atalanta	Lecce
18:30 CET (UTC+1)	Baschirotto 28'; Di Francesco 30'; Pongračić (yellow card) 68'	Report	Zapata 40'; Ruggeri (yellow card) 76'; Koopmeiners (yellow card) 87'	Stadium: Stadio Via del mare Attendance: 19,948; Referee: Gianluca Aureliano

12 November 2022 15	Sampdoria	0–2	Lecce	Genoa
18:00 CET (UTC+1)	Amione (yellow card) 33'; Đuričić (yellow card) 37'	Report	Umtiti (yellow card) 45'; Colombo 45+1'; Gonzàlez (yellow card) 57'; Banda 83'; Askildsen (yellow card) 87'	Stadium: Stadio Luigi Ferraris; Attendance: 14,561; Referee: Daniele Doveri

4 January 2023 16	Lecce	2–1	Lazio	Lecce
16:30 CET (UTC+1)	Banda (yellow card) 6'; Gallo (yellow card) 48'; Strefezza 57'; Colombo 71'; Hjulmand (yellow card) 78'	Report	Immobile 14'; Casale (yellow card) 37'; Cancellieri (yellow card) 90+2'	Stadium: Stadio Via del mare Attendance: 26,084; Referee: Livio Marinelli

8 January 2023 17	Spezia	0–0	Lecce	La Spezia
15:00 CET (UTC+1)		Report	Baschirotto (yellow card) 56'	Stadium: Stadio Alberto Picco; Attendance: 7,300; Referee: Daniele Chiffi

14 January 2023 18	Lecce	2–2	Milan	Lecce
18:00 CET (UTC+1)	Hernandez 3' (o.g.); Baschirotto 23'; Maleh (yellow card) 64'	Report	Leão 58'; Calabria (yellow card) 67', (goal) 70'; Bennacer (yellow card) 86'	Stadium: Stadio Via del mare Attendance: 25,942; Referee: Daniele Orsato

21 January 2023 19	Hellas Verona	2–0	Lecce	Verona
15:00 CET (UTC+1)	Tameze (yellow card) 17'; Dawidowicz (yellow card) 23'; Depaoli 40'; Lazović 54'; Ceccherini (yellow card) 74'	Report		Stadium: Stadio Marcantonio Bentegodi; Attendance: 19,955; Referee: Federico La Penna

27 January 2023 20	Lecce	1–2	Salernitana	Lecce
20:45 CET (UTC+1)	Strefezza 23'; Maleh (yellow card) 53'; Baschirotto (yellow card) 63'	Report	Dia 5'; Vilhena 20'; Coulibaly (yellow card) 40'; Bradarić (yellow card) 43'; Sambia (yellow card) 80'; Nicolussi (yellow card) 90'	Stadium: Stadio Via del mare Attendance: 24,446; Referee: Davide Massa

4 February 2023 21	Cremonese	0–2	Lecce	Cremona
15:00 CET (UTC+1)	Pickel (yellow card) 45+3'	Report	Baschirotto 58'; Strefezza 69'; Colombo (yellow card) 76'; Askildsen (yellow card) 89'	Stadium: Stadio Giovanni Zini; Attendance: 11,189; Referee: Daniele Orsato

11 February 2023 22	Lecce	1–1	Roma	Lecce
18:00 CET (UTC+1)	Ibañez 7' (o.g.); Strefezza (yellow card) 16'; Colombo (yellow card) 52'; Gonzàlez (yellow card) 62'; Hjulmand (yellow card) 90+1'	Report	Dybala 17' (pen.); Ibañez (yellow card) 33'	Stadium: Stadio Via del mare Attendance: 25,200; Referee: Gianluca Aureliano

19 February 2023 23	Atalanta	1–2	Lecce	Bergamo
12:30 CET (UTC+1)	Demiral (yellow card) 5'; Zappacosta (yellow card) 12'; Mæhle (yellow card) 83'; Højlund 87'	Report	Ceesay 4'; Di Francesco (yellow card) 55'; Gallo (yellow card) 64'; Blin 74', (yellow card) 76'	Stadium: Gewiss Stadium; Attendance: 19,435; Referee: Marco Piccinini

25 February 2023 24	Lecce	0–1	Sassuolo	Lecce
20:45 CET (UTC+1)	Banda (yellow card) 17'; Baschirotto (yellow card) 74'	Report	Berardi (yellow card) 22'; Obiang (yellow card) 35'; Thorstvedt 65'	Stadium: Stadio Via del mare Attendance: 23,760; Referee: Niccolò Baroni

5 March 2023 25	Internazionale	2–0	Lecce	Milan
18:00 CET (UTC+1)	Mkhitaryan 29'; Martínez 53'	Report		Stadium: San Siro; Attendance: 75,033; Referee: Gianluca Manganiello

12 March 2023 26	Lecce	0–2	Torino	Lecce
12:30 CET (UTC+1)	Gonzàlez (yellow card) 28'; Strefezza (yellow card) 33'; Hjulmand (yellow card) 44'	Report	Singo 20'; Sanabria 23'; Buongiorno (yellow card) 29'; Milinković-Savić (yellow card) 33'; Ilić (yellow card) 33'	Stadium: Stadio Via del Mare; Attendance: 24,413; Referee: Juan Luca Sacchi

19 March 2023 27	Fiorentina	1–0	Lecce	Florence
15:00 CET (UTC+1)	Gallo 27' (o.g.); Igor (yellow card) 63'	Report	Blin (yellow card) 25'; Maleh (yellow card) 72'; Umtiti (yellow card) 89'	Stadium: Stadio Artemio Franchi; Attendance: 34,604; Referee: Rosario Abisso

3 April 2023 28	Empoli	1–0	Lecce	Empoli
18:30 CEST (UTC+2)	Bandinelli (yellow card) 19'; Caputo 62' (pen.); Fazzini (yellow card) 71'; Marin (yellow card) 90+6'	Report	Blin (yellow card) 22'; Tuia (yellow card) 68'; Umtiti (yellow card) 89'	Stadium: Stadio Carlo Castellani; Attendance: 8,844; Referee: Michael Fabbri

7 April 2023 29	Lecce	1–2	Napoli	Lecce
19:00 CEST (UTC+2)	Di Francesco 52'; Gendrey (yellow card) 62'; Umtiti (yellow card) 86'	Report	Di Lorenzo 18'; Gallo 64' (o.g.); Ndombele (yellow card) 72'	Stadium: Stadio Via del mare Attendance: 25,799; Referee: Gianluca Manganiello

16 April 2023 30	Lecce	1–1	Sampdoria	Lecce
12:30 CEST (UTC+2)	Ceesay 31'; Di Francesco (yellow card) 73'	Report	Leris (yellow card) 52'; Sabiri (yellow card) 67'; Jesé 75'; Rincón (yellow card) 84'; Augello (yellow card) 86'	Stadium: Stadio Via del mare Attendance: 22,471; Referee: Maurizio Mariani

23 April 2023 31	Milan	2–0	Lecce	Milan
18:00 CEST (UTC+2)	Thiaw (yellow card) 27'; Leão 40', 75'	Report		Stadium: San Siro; Attendance: 72,614; Referee: Daniele Chiffi

28 April 2023 32	Lecce	1–0	Udinese	Lecce
18:30 CEST (UTC+2)	Blin (yellow card) 35'; Strefezza (yellow card) 51', (goal) 62' (pen.); Gonzàlez (yellow card) 85'; Ceesay (yellow card) 90+1'	Report	Bijol (yellow card) 7'; Pérez (yellow card) 53'	Stadium: Stadio Via del Mare; Attendance: 23,069; Referee: Matteo Marchetti

3 May 2023 33	Juventus	2–1	Lecce	Turin
18:00 CEST (UTC+2)	Paredes 15', (yellow card) 55'; Vlahović 40'; Bremer (yellow card) 76'	Report	Ceesay 37' (pen.); Umititi (yellow card) 48'; Pezzella (yellow card) 61'	Stadium: Juventus Stadium; Attendance: 33,757; Referee: Francesco Fourneau

7 May 2023 34	Lecce	0–1	Hellas Verona	Lecce
20:45 CEST (UTC+2)	Hjulmand (yellow card) 23'; Oudin (yellow card) 79'	Report	Faraoni (yellow card) 19'; Abildgaard (yellow card) 35'; Magnani (yellow card) 52'; Ngonge 71', (yellow card) 86'; Montipò (yellow card) 82'	Stadium: Stadio Via del mare Attendance: 24,768; Referee: Davide Massa

12 May 2023 35	Lazio	2–2	Lecce	Rome
20:45 CEST (UTC+2)	Lazzari (yellow card) 8'; Immobile 34'; Pellegrini (yellow card) 78'; Milinković-Savić (yellow card) 81', (goal) 90+4'	Report	Banda (yellow card) 13'; Strefezza (penalty missed) 23'; Oudin 45+2', 51', (yellow card) 65'; Falcone (yellow card) 79'; Blin (yellow card) 82'; Gonzàlez (yellow card) 90+3'	Stadium: Stadio Olimpico; Attendance: 44,500; Referee: Fabio Maresca

21 May 2023 36	Lecce	0–0	Spezia	Lecce
12:30 CEST (UTC+2)	Umtiti (yellow card) 49'; Blin (yellow card) 89'	Report	Wiśniewski (yellow card) 59'; Esposito (yellow card) 86'; Nzola (yellow card) 89'	Stadium: Stadio Via del mare Attendance: 26,022; Referee: Maurizio Mariani

28 May 2023 37	Monza	0–1	Lecce	Monza
20:45 CEST (UTC+2)	Sensi (yellow card) 54'; Birindelli (yellow card) 65'; Donati (red card) 82'; Gytkjær (penalty missed) 84'	Report	Banda (yellow card) 57'; Baschirotto (yellow card) 82'; Hjulmand (yellow card) 90+2'; Colombo 90+11' (pen.)	Stadium: Stadio Brianteo; Attendance: 15,039; Referee: Daniele Doveri
Note: Donati was sent off for dissent while a substitute.

4 June 2023 38	Lecce	2–3	Bologna	Lecce
21:00 CEST (UTC+2)	Banda 17'; Gallo (yellow card) 68'; Oudin 88'	Report	Posch (yellow card) 35'; Arnautović 58'; Zirkzee 81'; Aebischer (yellow card) 84'; Ferguson 90+7'	Stadium: Stadio Via del mare Attendance: 25,816; Referee: Marco Piccinini

=== Coppa Italia ===
5 August 2022 Round of 64	Lecce	2–3 (a.e.t.)	Cittadella	Lecce
21:00 CEST (UTC+2)	Strefezza 61'; Gonzàlez (yellow card) 90+2'; Colombo 105+1'	Report	Frare (yellow card) 18'; Donnarumma (yellow card) 33'; Perticone (yellow card) 63'; Asencio 73'; Tounkara 93', 100'	Stadium: Stadio Via del mare Attendance: 15,857; Referee: Gianpiero Miele
