= 2021–22 US Lecce season =

Lecce
2021–22 season
- President: Saverio Sticchi Damiani
- Head coach: Marco Baroni
- Stadium: Stadio Via del Mare
- Serie B: 1st (promoted)
- Coppa Italia: Round of 16
- Top goalscorer: League: Massimo Coda (20); All: Massimo Coda (22)
- Biggest win: Lecce 4–0 Parma
- Biggest defeat: Cremonese 3–0 Lecce
| Home colours | Away colours |

The 2021–22 season was U.S. Lecce's second consecutive season in second division of the Italian football league, the Serie B, and the 95th as a football club.

== Players ==
=== First-team squad ===
Note: Flags indicate national team as defined under FIFA eligibility rules; some limited exceptions apply. Players may hold more than one non-FIFA nationality.

| No. | Pos. | Nation | Player |
|---|---|---|---|
| 1 | GK | ITA | Marco Bleve |
| 3 | DF | COL | Brayan Vera |
| 5 | DF | ITA | Fabio Lucioni (captain) |
| 6 | DF | CRO | Lorenco Šimić |
| 7 | FW | ITA | Antonino Ragusa |
| 8 | MF | ITA | Mario Gargiulo |
| 9 | FW | ITA | Massimo Coda |
| 10 | FW | ITA | Francesco Di Mariano |
| 13 | DF | ITA | Alessandro Tuia |
| 14 | MF | ISL | Þórir Jóhann Helgason |
| 17 | DF | FRA | Valentin Gendrey |
| 18 | DF | ROU | David Stefan |
| 21 | GK | BRA | Gabriel |

| No. | Pos. | Nation | Player |
|---|---|---|---|
| 22 | GK | ITA | Alessandro Plizzari (on loan from Milan) |
| 23 | MF | SWE | John Björkengren |
| 24 | MF | ITA | Paolo Faragò (on loan from Cagliari) |
| 25 | DF | ITA | Antonino Gallo |
| 27 | MF | BRA | Gabriel Strefezza |
| 29 | MF | FRA | Alexis Blin |
| 30 | DF | ITA | Antonio Barreca (on loan from Monaco) |
| 33 | DF | ITA | Arturo Calabresi |
| 37 | MF | SLO | Žan Majer |
| 42 | MF | DEN | Morten Hjulmand |
| 44 | DF | ALB | Kastriot Dermaku |
| 90 | FW | ESP | Raúl Asencio |
| 99 | FW | ESP | Pablo Rodríguez |

=== Out on loan ===
Note: Flags indicate national team as defined under FIFA eligibility rules; some limited exceptions apply. Players may hold more than one non-FIFA nationality.

| No. | Pos. | Nation | Player |
|---|---|---|---|
| — | DF | ITA | Silvio Colella (at Bitonto) |
| — | DF | ITA | Ilario Monterisi (at Fidelis Andria) |
| — | DF | ITA | Stefano Pani (at Seregno) |
| — | DF | ITA | Vito Mattia Radicchio (at Bitonto) |

| No. | Pos. | Nation | Player |
|---|---|---|---|
| — | MF | ITA | Gianmarco Mancarella (at Nardò) |
| — | MF | ITA | Sergio Maselli (at Foggia) |
| — | MF | ITA | Roberto Pierno (at Virtus Francavilla) |
| — | FW | ITA | Mattia Felici (at Palermo) |

== Pre-season and friendlies ==
Win Draw Loss

| 24 July 2021 Friendly | Spezia (Italy) | Cancelled | (Italy) Lecce | Arco di Trento, Italy |
| 17:00 CEST (UTC+2) | | | | Stadium: Stadio Comunale di Arco |

| 24 July 2021 Friendly | Lecce (Italy) | 0–0 | (Italy) Legnago Salus | Folgaria, Italy |
| 17:00 CEST (UTC+2) | | | | Stadium: Centro Sportivo Folgaria |

| 30 July 2021 Friendly | Vicenza (Italy) | 0–1 | (Italy) Lecce | Vicenza, Italy |
| 20:00 CEST (UTC+2) | | | | Stadium: Stadio Romeo Menti |

| 7 August 2021 Friendly | SC Heerenveen (Netherlands) | 1–1 | (Italy) Lecce | Heerenveen, Netherlands |
| 18:30 CEST (UTC+2) | | | | Stadium: Abe Lenstra Stadion |
Note: Finished after 47 minutes due to a storm.

== Competitions ==
=== Overall record ===
| Competition | First match | Last match | Starting round | Final position | Record | | | | | | | |
| Competition | First match | Last match | Starting round | Final position | Pld | W | D | L | GF | GA | GD | Win % |
|---|---|---|---|---|---|---|---|---|---|---|---|---|
| Serie B | 22 August 2021 | 6 May 2022 | Matchday 1 | Winners | 38 | 19 | 14 | 5 | 59 | 31 | +28 | 50.00 |
| Coppa Italia | 15 August 2021 | 20 January 2022 | First round | Round of 16 | 3 | 2 | 0 | 1 | 6 | 4 | +2 | 66.67 |
| Total | | | | | 41 | 21 | 14 | 6 | 65 | 35 | +30 | 51.22 |

Source: Soccerway

=== Serie B ===
==== League table ====
| Pos | Team | Pld | W | D | L | GF | GA | GD | Pts | Promotion, qualification or relegation |
|---|---|---|---|---|---|---|---|---|---|---|
| 1 | Lecce (C, P) | 38 | 19 | 14 | 5 | 59 | 31 | +28 | 71 | Promotion to Serie A |
| 2 | Cremonese (P) | 38 | 20 | 9 | 9 | 57 | 39 | +18 | 69 | Promotion to Serie A |
| 3 | Pisa | 38 | 18 | 13 | 7 | 48 | 35 | +13 | 67 (Note: Pisa finished ahead of Monza on head-to-head points: Pisa 2–1 Monza, Monza 1–2 Pisa.) | Qualification for promotion play-offs semi-finals |
| 4 | Monza (O, P) | 38 | 19 | 10 | 9 | 60 | 38 | +22 | 67 | Qualification for promotion play-offs semi-finals |
| 5 | Brescia | 38 | 17 | 15 | 6 | 55 | 35 | +20 | 66 | Qualification for promotion play-offs preliminary round |

Source: Lega Serie B (in Italian), Soccerway (in English)
Rules for classification: 1) Points; 2) Head-to-head points; 3) Head-to-head goal difference; 4) Goal difference; 5) Goals scored; 6) Draw.
(C) Champions; (O) Play-off winners; (P) Promoted

==== Results summary ====
| Overall | | | | | | | | Home | | | | | | Away | | | | | |
| Pld | W | D | L | GF | GA | GD | Pts | W | D | L | GF | GA | GD | W | D | L | GF | GA | GD |
|---|---|---|---|---|---|---|---|---|---|---|---|---|---|---|---|---|---|---|---|
| 38 | 19 | 14 | 5 | 59 | 31 | +28 | 71 | 12 | 5 | 1 | 36 | 14 | +22 | 7 | 9 | 4 | 23 | 17 | +6 |

Source: Serie B

==== Results by round ====
| Round | 1 | 2 | 3 | 4 | 5 | 6 | 7 | 8 | 9 | 10 | 11 | 12 | 13 | 14 | 15 | 16 | 17 | 18 | 19 | 20 | 21 | 22 | 23 | 24 | 25 | 26 | 27 | 28 | 29 | 30 | 31 | 32 | 33 | 34 | 35 | 36 | 37 | 38 |
|---|---|---|---|---|---|---|---|---|---|---|---|---|---|---|---|---|---|---|---|---|---|---|---|---|---|---|---|---|---|---|---|---|---|---|---|---|---|---|
| Ground | H | A | H | A | H | A | H | A | H | A | H | A | H | A | H | A | H | H | A | A | H | A | H | A | H | A | H | A | H | A | H | H | A | H | A | H | A | H |
| Result | L | D | D | W | W | W | W | D | D | D | W | W | D | D | W | W | L | W | W | W | D | D | D | W | L | W | W | D | D | D | D | W | W | W | L | W | L | W |
| Position | 20 | 15 | 16 | 12 | 10 | 6 | 4 | 3 | 4 | 5 | 3 | 2 | 3 | 3 | 3 | 2 | 3 | 4 | 5 | 3 | 1 | 1 | 2 | 1 | 2 | 2 | 1 | 2 | 2 | 2 | 4 | 2 | 2 | 1 | 2 | 1 | 1 | 1 |

Source: Serie B
A = Away; H = Home; W = Win; D = Draw; L = Loss

==== Matches ====
The league fixtures were announced on 24 July 2021.

| 22 August 2021 1 | Cremonese | 3–0 | Lecce | Cremona |
| 20:30 CET | Valeri (yellow card) 31' (goal) 65'; Castagnetti (yellow card) 39'; Valzania 51'; Buonaiuto 60'; Ravanelli (yellow card) 83' | Report | Gabriel Strefezza (yellow card) 39' | Stadium: Stadio Giovanni Zini; Attendance: 2,372; Referee: (Italy) Niccolò Baroni |

| 29 August 2021 2 | Lecce | 1–1 | Como | Lecce |
| --:-- CEST (UTC+2) | | | | Stadium: Stadio Via del mare |

| 10 September 2021 3 | Benevento | 0–0 | Lecce | Benevento |
| --:-- CEST (UTC+2) | | | | Stadium: Stadio Ciro Vigorito |

| 18 September 2021 4 | Lecce | 3–2 | Alessandria | Lecce |
| --:-- CEST (UTC+2) | | | | Stadium: Stadio Via del mare |

| 21 September 2021 5 | Crotone | 0–3 | Lecce | Crotone |
| --:-- CEST (UTC+2) | | | | Stadium: Stadio Ezio Scida |

| 25 September 2021 6 | Cittadella | 1–2 | Lecce | Cittadella |
| --:-- CEST (UTC+2) | | | | Stadium: Stadio Pier Cesare Tombolato |

| 1 October 2021 7 | Lecce | 3–0 | Monza | Lecce |
| --:-- CEST (UTC+2) | | | | Stadium: Stadio Via del mare |

| 16 October 2021 8 | Ascoli | 1–1 | Lecce | Ascoli |
| --:-- CEST (UTC+2) | | | | Stadium: Stadio Cino e Lillo Del Duca |

| 23 October 2021 9 | Lecce | 0–0 | Perugia | Lecce |
| --:-- CEST (UTC+2) | | | | Stadium: Stadio Via del mare |

| 28 October 2021 10 | Brescia | 1–1 | Lecce | Brescia |
| 18:00 CEST (UTC+2) | Bisoli 87' | Report | Dermaku 81'; Hjulmand (yellow card) 85' | Stadium: Stadio Mario Rigamonti; Referee: Massimiliano Irrati |

| 1 November 2021 11 | Lecce | 3–1 | Cosenza | Lecce |
| --:-- CET (UTC+1) | | | | Stadium: Stadio Via del mare |

| 7 November 2021 12 | Lecce | 4–0 | Parma | Lecce |
| --:-- CET (UTC+1) | | | | Stadium: Stadio Via del mare |

| 20 November 2021 13 | Frosinone | 0–0 | Lecce | Frosinone |
| --:-- CET (UTC+1) | | | | Stadium: Stadio Benito Stirpe |

| 26 November 2021 14 | Lecce | 3–3 | Ternana | Lecce |
| --:-- CET (UTC+1) | | | | Stadium: Stadio Via del mare |

| 30 November 2021 15 | SPAL | 1–3 | Lecce | Ferrara |
| --:-- CET (UTC+1) | | | | Stadium: Stadio Paolo Mazza |

| 4 December 2021 16 | Lecce | 2–0 | Reggina | Lecce |
| --:-- CET (UTC+1) | | | | Stadium: Stadio Via del mare |

| 11 December 2021 17 | Pisa | 1–0 | Lecce | Pisa |
| 16:15 CET | Gucher (yellow card) 21'; Nagy (yellow card) 50'; Sibilli 58'; Touré (yellow card) 90+2' | Report | Hjulmand (yellow card) 16'; Barreca (yellow card) 29'; Majer (yellow card) 77'; Calabresi (yellow card) 88' | Stadium: Arena Garibaldi – Stadio Romeo Anconetani; Attendance: 7,041; Referee: (Italy) Daniele Orsato |

| 16 January 2022 19 | Pordenone | 0–1 | Lecce | Pordenone |
| --:-- CET (UTC+1) | | | | Stadium: Stadio Guido Teghil |

| 23 January 2022 20 | Lecce | 2–1 | Cremonese | Lecce |
| 18:30 CET | Gabriel Strefezza (yellow card) 6'; Gallo 14'; Dermaku (yellow card) 52'; Lucioni (yellow card) 58'; Okoli 90+1' (o.g.) | Report | Valeri (yellow card) 11'; Ciofani 15'; Valzania (yellow card) 21'; Strizzolo (yellow card) 90+4' | Stadium: Stadio Via del mare Attendance: 3,080; Referee: (Italy) Daniele Chiffi |

| 26 January 2022 18 | Lecce | 2–1 | Vicenza | Lecce |
| --:-- CET (UTC+1) | | | | Stadium: Stadio Via del mare |

| 5 February 2022 21 | Como | 1–1 | Lecce | Como |
| --:-- CET (UTC+1) | | | | Stadium: Stadio Giuseppe Sinigaglia |

| 13 February 2022 22 | Lecce | 1–1 | Benevento | Lecce |
| --:-- CET (UTC+1) | | | | Stadium: Stadio Via del mare |

| 16 February 2022 23 | Alessandria | 1–1 | Lecce | Alessandria |
| --:-- CET (UTC+1) | | | | Stadium: Stadio Giuseppe Moccagatta |

| 20 February 2022 24 | Lecce | 3–0 | Crotone | Lecce |
| --:-- CET (UTC+1) | | | | Stadium: Stadio Via del mare |

| 23 February 2022 25 | Lecce | 1–2 | Cittadella | Lecce |
| --:-- CET (UTC+1) | | | | Stadium: Stadio Via del mare |

| 27 February 2022 26 | Monza | 0–1 | Lecce | Monza |
| --:-- CET (UTC+1) | | | | Stadium: Stadio Brianteo |

| 2 March 2022 27 | Lecce | 3–1 | Ascoli | Lecce |
| --:-- CET (UTC+1) | | | | Stadium: Stadio Via del mare |

| 6 March 2022 28 | Perugia | 1–1 | Lecce | Perugia |
| --:-- CET (UTC+1) | | | | Stadium: Stadio Renato Curi |

| 12 March 2022 29 | Lecce | 1–1 | Brescia | Lecce |
| 14:00 CET (UTC+1) | Barreca (yellow card) 11'; Strefezza 19'; Plizzari (yellow card) 29' | Report | Van de Looi (yellow card) 7'; Pajač (penalty missed) 30'; Bisoli 30'; Sabelli (yellow card) 42'; Proia (yellow card) 57' | Stadium: Stadio Via del mare Referee: Michael Fabbri |

| 15 March 2022 30 | Cosenza | 2–2 | Lecce | Cosenza |
| --:-- CET (UTC+1) | | | | Stadium: Stadio San Vito-Gigi Marulla |

| 19 March 2022 31 | Parma | 0–0 | Lecce | Parma |
| --:-- CET (UTC+1) | | | | Stadium: Stadio Ennio Tardini |

| 2 April 2022 32 | Lecce | 1–0 | Frosinone | Lecce |
| --:-- CEST (UTC+2) | | | | Stadium: Stadio Via del mare |

| 5 April 2022 33 | Ternana | 1–4 | Lecce | Terni |
| --:-- CEST (UTC+2) | | | | Stadium: Stadio Libero Liberati |

| 9 April 2022 34 | Lecce | 1–0 | SPAL | Lecce |
| 14:00 CEST (UTC+2) | Helgason 66' | Report | | Stadium: Stadio Via del mare Referee: Matteo Marchetti |

| 18 April 2022 35 | Reggina | 1–0 | Lecce | Reggio Calabria |
| 15:00 CEST (UTC+2) | Folorunsho 45+2' | Report | | Stadium: Stadio Oreste Granillo; Referee: Francesco Fourneau |

| 25 April 2022 36 | Lecce | 2–0 | Pisa | Lecce |
| 15:00 CEST (UTC+2) | Lucioni 18'; Gallo (yellow card) 65'; Coda (yellow card) 73'; Tuia (yellow card) 76'; Faragò 85' | Report | Marin (yellow card) 63'; Caracciolo (yellow card) 78'; Leverbe (yellow card) 90+1' | Stadium: Stadio Via del mare Attendance: 23,933; Referee: (Italy) Luca Pairetto |

| 30 April 2022 37 | Vicenza | 2–1 | Lecce | Vicenza |
| 14:00 CEST (UTC+2) | Diaw 90+4' (pen.); Ranocchia 90+13' | Report | Strefezza 69' | Stadium: Stadio Romeo Menti; Referee: Maurizio Mariani |

| 6 May 2022 38 | Lecce | 1–0 | Pordenone | Lecce |
| 20:30 CEST (UTC+2) | Majer 46' | Report | | Stadium: Stadio Via del mare Referee: Marco Piccinini |

=== Coppa Italia ===
| 15 August 2021 Round of 64 | Parma | 1–3 | Lecce | Parma |
| 18:00 CEST | Brunetta 7' | Report | Coda 9', 76'; Tuia 40' | Stadium: Stadio Ennio Tardini; Attendance: 1,306; Referee: Marco Serra |

| 16 December 2021 Round of 32 | Spezia | 0–2 | Lecce | La Spezia |
| 18:00 CET (UTC+1) | Strelec (yellow card) 6'; Nzola (yellow card) 30'; Nguiamba (yellow card) 79' | Report | Dermaku (yellow card) 17'; Barreca (yellow card) 35'; Listkowski 43'; Rodríguez (yellow card) 49'; Calabresi 55'; Blin (yellow card) 90+3' | Stadium: Stadio Alberto Picco; Attendance: 1,838; Referee: Valerio Marini |

| 20 January 2022 Round of 16 | Roma | 3–1 | Lecce | Rome |
| 21:00 CET (UTC+1) | Afena-Gyan (yellow card) 38'; Kumbulla 40'; Abraham 54', (yellow card) 76'; Ibañez (yellow card) 71'; Shomurodov 81' | Report | Listkowski (yellow card) 12'; Calabresi 14'; Helgason (yellow card) 44'; Di Mariano (yellow card) 45+1'; Gargiulo (yellow card) 60' (yellow-red card) 62' | Stadium: Stadio Olimpico; Referee: Manuel Volpi |
