= Joel Voelkerling Persson =

Swedish footballer (born 2003)

- Voelkerling Persson with Sweden U21 in 2023

Personal information
- Full name: Joel Axel Krister Voelkerling Persson
- Date of birth: 15 January 2003 (age 23)
- Place of birth: Dalköpinge, Sweden
- Height: 1.94 m (6 ft 4 in)
- Position: Centre-forward

Team information
- Current team: Rosengård 1917
- Number: 9

Youth career
- –2019: Trelleborg
- 2019–2022: Roma

Senior career*
| Years | Team | Apps | (Gls) |
| 2021–2022 | Roma | 0 | (0) |
| 2022–2025 | Lecce | 9 | (0) |
| 2023–2024 | → Vitesse (loan) | 9 | (0) |
| 2024 | → Värnamo (loan) | 7 | (0) |
| 2025 | Öster | 7 | (0) |
| 2026– | Rosengård 1917 | 25 | (14) |

International career^{‡}
| 2021 | Sweden U19 | 2 | (0) |
| 2023 | Sweden U21 | 5 | (0) |
- * Club domestic league appearances and goals as of 16 November 2026 ‡ National team caps and goals as of 17:37, 16 October 2024 (UTC)

Joel Axel Krister Voelkerling Persson (born 15 January 2003) is a Swedish professional footballer who plays as a centre-forward for Rosengård 1917.

== Club career ==
Born in Dalköpinge, Sweden, Voelkerling Persson played for the academy of local club Trelleborg before joining the youth sector of Serie A side Roma in January 2019, following a successful trial at the Italian club. Initially assigned to the under-17 squad, the centre-forward came through Roma's youth ranks before renewing his contract with the club in the summer of 2020.

During the 2021–22 season, Voelkerling Persson started training with Roma's first team under manager José Mourinho, and made his first bench appearances for the senior squad in several Serie A and UEFA Europa Conference League matches. During the same campaign, he was a part of Roma's under-19 squad that reached the final of the national championship before losing to Inter Milan.

On 13 July 2022, Voelkerling Persson joined newly promoted Serie A side Lecce on a permanent deal, signing a five-year contract with the club. The transfer reportedly commanded a fee of almost €1 million, with a 50% sell-on clause and a buy-back option in favor of Roma.

After struggling with injuries in the first half of the 2022–23 season, the forward made his professional debut in Serie A on 14 January 2023, coming on as a substitute for Lorenzo Colombo in the 72nd minute of a 2–2 home draw against Milan.

On 26 August 2023, Lecce announced that they had agreed with Dutch side Vitesse to transfer Voelkerling Persson and that he was set to complete his medical tests in the Netherlands. The deal was officially completed three days later, with the player joining the Eredivisie club on a season-long loan with an option to buy. He played nine games for Vitesse throughout the 2023–24 league season.

On 17 August 2024, Voelkerling Persson joined Allsvenskan club IFK Värnamo on loan until the end of the 2024 campaign, with an option to buy and a sell-on clause in favor of Lecce.

On 9 July 2025, Voelkerling Persson moved to Öster until the end of 2026.

On 26 March 2026, Voelkerling Persson moved to Rosengård 1917 until the end of 2028.

== International career ==
Voelkerling Persson has represented Sweden at youth international level, having played for the under-19 national team.

== Personal life ==
He has an older brother, Jakob, who is also a professional footballer and plays as a defender.

== Career statistics ==
=== Club ===
As of match played 19 May 2024

| Club | Season | League | | | Cup (Note: Including appearances in Coppa Italia and KNVB Cup.) | | Europe | | Other | | Total | |
| Club | Season | Division | Apps | Goals | Apps | Goals | Apps | Goals | Apps | Goals | Apps | Goals |
|---|---|---|---|---|---|---|---|---|---|---|---|---|
| Roma | 2021-22 | Serie A | 0 | 0 | 0 | 0 | 0 | 0 | – | | 0 | 0 |
| Lecce | 2022–23 | Serie A | 9 | 0 | 0 | 0 | – | | – | | 9 | 0 |
| Vitesse (loan) | 2023–24 | Eredivisie | 9 | 0 | 0 | 0 | – | | – | | 9 | 0 |
| Career total | | | 18 | 0 | 0 | 0 | 0 | 0 | 0 | 0 | 18 | 0 |
