= Morten Hjulmand =

Danish footballer (born 1999)

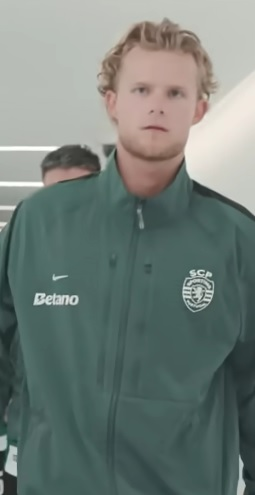
- Hjulmand with Sporting CP in 2024

Personal information
- Full name: Morten Blom Due Hjulmand
- Date of birth: 25 June 1999 (age 27)
- Place of birth: Kastrup, Denmark
- Height: 1.85 m (6 ft 1 in)
- Position: Defensive midfielder

Team information
- Current team: Atlético Madrid
- Number: 23

Youth career
- Korinth IF
- AB Tårnby
- –2018: Copenhagen

Senior career*
Years	Team	Apps	(Gls)
2018–2020	Admira Wacker	68	(1)
2021–2023	Lecce	91	(0)
2023–2026	Sporting CP	85	(8)
2026–	Atlético Madrid	11	(0)

International career^{‡}
2017–2018	Denmark U19	18	(1)
2018–2021	Denmark U21	15	(1)
2023–	Denmark	33	(1)
- * Club domestic league appearances and goals as of 17:12, 8 November 2026 (UTC) ‡ National team caps and goals as of 18:35, 17 November 2026 (UTC)

Morten Blom Due Hjulmand (Danish pronunciation: [ˈmɒːtn̩ ˈjuːlˌmænˀ]; born 25 June 1999) is a Danish professional footballer who plays as a defensive midfielder for La Liga club Atlético Madrid and the Denmark national team.

Hjulmand joined Admira Wacker's youth system from Copenhagen in May 2018 and made his first-team debut in July. In January 2021, he moved to Serie B side Lecce, helping win the 2021–22 Serie B title, and achieve to promotion from the same division to Serie A. Sporting CP signed him in August 2023 and he helped them win the 2023–24 Primeira Liga title.

Hjulmand has also represented Denmark at various youth levels, before making his senior international debut in September 2023, and he was selected for UEFA Euro 2024.

== Club career ==
=== Admira Wacker ===
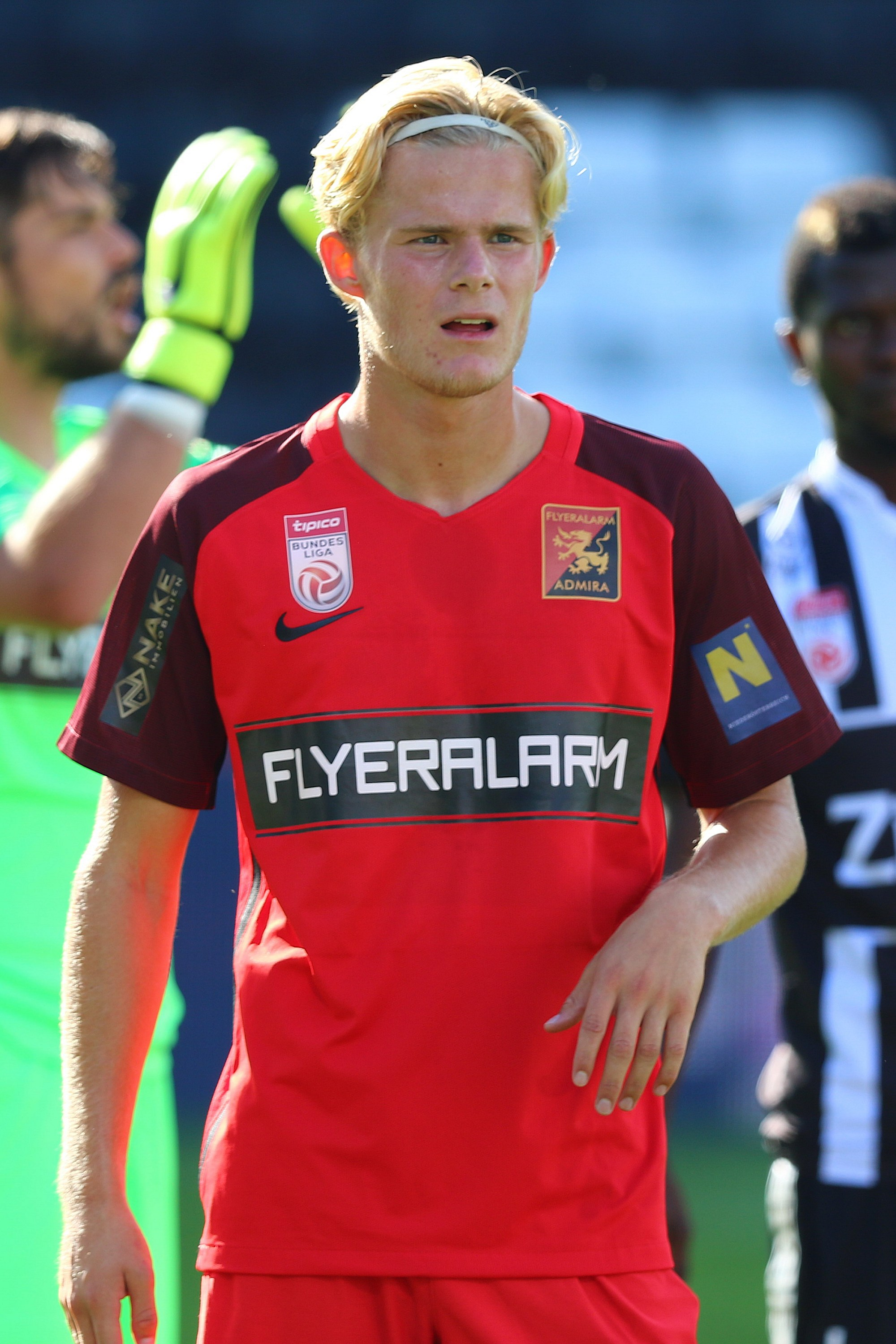
Hjulmand with Admira Wacker in 2018

Born in Kastrup, Denmark, Hjulmand progressed through the academy at Copenhagen, he moved to Austria on 13 May 2018 to join Admira Wacker's U-19 squad, signing a contract until June 2022. Hjulmand had never played any official games for Copenhagen's first team, but had been on training camps with them

He made his first team debut on 20 July 2018, in the 1–0 loss against Neusiedl in the Austrian Cup. Six days later, he also made his debut in the UEFA Europa League, starting in the 3–0 loss to CSKA Sofia, being replaced at half-time by Daniel Toth. On 29 July, he made his debut in the Austrian Bundesliga, coming on as a substitute to Daniel Toth in the 78th minute, in the 3–0 loss to Rapid Wien. In his first year with the Austrian club, he established himself as a starter, playing 32 games in total.

The following season, on 19 October 2019, he scored his first goal for the club's first team, in a 4–1 league win away to Altach. After two and a half seasons, he made 68 appearances, with this goal being the only goal he scored for the club.

=== Lecce ===
Having started the 2020–21 season with Admira, on 16 January 2021, Hjulmand signed a four-year contract with Italian club Lecce for a fee of €170,000, in the second-tier Serie B at the time. He made his debut with the Giallorossi eight days later, coming on as a substitute in the second half of the league match, which ended in a 2–2 home draw against Empoli.

Having quickly established himself as one of the pillars of the team, he established himself as one of the best midfielders in Serie B, helping them reach the promotion play-offs semi-finals, where they failed to gain promotion to Serie A at the end of the 2020–21 season. In the 2021–22 season, Hjulmand accumulated the most minutes in the 2021–22 Serie B season, with Lecce being crowned Serie B champions, and gaining promotion to Serie A for the 2022–23 season, as a result, Lecce returned to the top flight after two years of absence.

The following season, Hjulmand was made Lecce's new captain, replacing Fabio Lucioni, who had recently left the club. In the process, he became the youngest club captain in Serie A history, aged 23. He made his top flight debut on 13 August 2022, in a 2–1 loss to Inter Milan. Under manager Marco Baroni, Hjulmand was entrusted an important role in the team's midfield, with his dynamism, vision, personality, technical and temperamental qualities, placing him among the top players in Serie A for average kilometres covered per match (over 10) and also led the league for the most balls recovered. At the end of the season, Lecce narrowly escaped relegation, with Hjulmand being a crucial figure in that feat.

=== Sporting CP ===
On 13 August 2023, Hjulmand signed a five-year contract with Primeira Liga club Sporting CP for a fee of €18 million, which could rise to €21 million with add-ons. His release clause was set at €80 million.

Five days later, Hjulmand made his debut for Sporting, coming off the bench to replace Marcus Edwards on the 75th minute of a 2–1 league victory away at Casa Pia. He made his first start for the Lions on 27 August, in a 1–0 home win over Famalicão, being replaced by Daniel Bragança on the 84th minute. On 17 September, Hjulmand scored his first goal for Sporting, the opener in a 3–0 league victory over Moreirense at Estádio José Alvalade.

Over the following months, Hjulmand effectively replaced Manuel Ugarte, while providing leadership to his team, appearancing in more advanced areas for long-distance shoots, leading his manager Ruben Amorim to deem him more complete player in his position than Ugarte and João Palhinha, who had recently left the club.

On 5 May, Sporting mathematically secured their 20th Primeira Liga title, following Benfica's defeat to Famalicão, and for his performances he was included in the league's Best XI.

On 7 July 2024, he was named as Sebastian Coates's replacement as club captain, after he left the club. In his first match as club captain, on 3 August, Sporting lost 4–3 to rivals Porto in the 2024 Supertaça Cândido de Oliveira, despite leading the game by three goals. Despite having lost the first trophy of the season, Sporting won both the Primeira Liga and Taça de Portugal.

=== Atlético Madrid ===
On 11 July 2026, Hjulmand joined La Liga club Atlético Madrid, signing a five-year-contract until 30 June 2031. The transfer fee was reported to be €40 million.

== International career ==
Hjulmand was called up to the senior Denmark squad for the UEFA Euro 2024 qualifying matches on 16 and 19 June 2023 against Northern Ireland and Slovenia, respectively. On 7 September 2023, Hjulmand made his debut for the senior team, coming off the bench in a 4–0 win over San Marino.

On 20 June 2024, he scored his first international goal; an equaliser against England at Euro 2024.

== Personal life ==
Hjulmand is not related to former Denmark national team manager Kasper Hjulmand.

He grew up as an Arsenal fan and has the club's crest tattooed on his left shoulder, but had the tattoo removed after transferring to Atlético Madrid in 2026.

He married Emilie Sofie Nissen, his girlfriend since secondary school, in 2024, in a private ceremony attended only by family members. They married again in 2025, at the church in Tårnby, their hometown, this time in a ceremony attended by teammates and others. The couple's first daughter was born on 4 March 2026.

== Career statistics ==
=== Club ===
As of match played 8 November 2026

Appearances and goals by club, season and competition
Club	Season	League			National cup (Note: Includes Austrian Cup, Coppa Italia, Taça de Portugal)		League cup (Note: Includes Taça da Liga)		Europe		Other		Total	
Club	Season	Division	Apps	Goals	Apps	Goals	Apps	Goals	Apps	Goals	Apps	Goals	Apps	Goals
Admira Wacker	2018–19	Austrian Bundesliga	29	0	1	0	—		2 (Note: Appearances in UEFA Europa League)	0	—		32	0
Admira Wacker	2019–20	Austrian Bundesliga	30	1	1	0	—		—		—		31	1
Admira Wacker	2020–21	Austrian Bundesliga	9	0	2	0	—		—		—		11	0
Admira Wacker	Total		68	1	4	0	—		2	0	—		74	1
Lecce	2020–21	Serie B	19	0	0	0	—		—		2 (Note: Appearances in Serie B promotion play-offs)	0	21	0
Lecce	2021–22	Serie B	37	0	1	0	—		—		—		38	0
Lecce	2022–23	Serie A	35	0	1	0	—		—		—		36	0
Lecce	Total		91	0	2	0	—		—		2	0	95	0
Sporting CP	2023–24	Primeira Liga	30	3	7	1	2	0	10	0	—		49	4
Sporting CP	2024–25	Primeira Liga	28	2	6	0	3	1	9 (Note: Appearances in UEFA Champions League)	0	1 (Note: Appearance in Supertaça Cândido de Oliveira)	0	47	3
Sporting CP	2025–26	Primeira Liga	27	3	6	0	1	0	11	0	1	0	46	3
Sporting CP	Total		85	8	19	1	6	1	30	0	2	0	142	10
Atlético Madrid	2026–27	La Liga	11	0	0	0	—		3	0	0	0	14	0
Career total			255	9	25	1	6	1	35	0	4	0	325	11

=== International ===
As of match played 17 November 2026

Appearances and goals by national team and year
National team	Year	Apps	Goals
Denmark	2023	3	0
Denmark	2024	12	1
Denmark	2025	10	0
Denmark	2026	8	0
Total		33	1

As of match played 31 March 2026
Scores and results list Denmark's goal tally first, score column indicates score after each Hjulmand goal.

List of international goals scored by Morten Hjulmand
No.	Date	Venue	Cap	Opponent	Score	Result	Competition
1	20 June 2024	Waldstadion, Frankfurt, Germany	9	England	1–1	1–1	UEFA Euro 2024

== Honours ==
Lecce

- Serie B: 2021–22

Sporting CP

- Primeira Liga: 2023–24, 2024–25
- Taça de Portugal: 2024–25

Individual

- Danish Football Player of the Year: 2024
- Primeira Liga Team of the Year: 2023–24, 2024–25, 2025–26
- Primeira Liga Midfielder of the Month: November 2024, November 2025
