= Joan González =

Spanish footballer

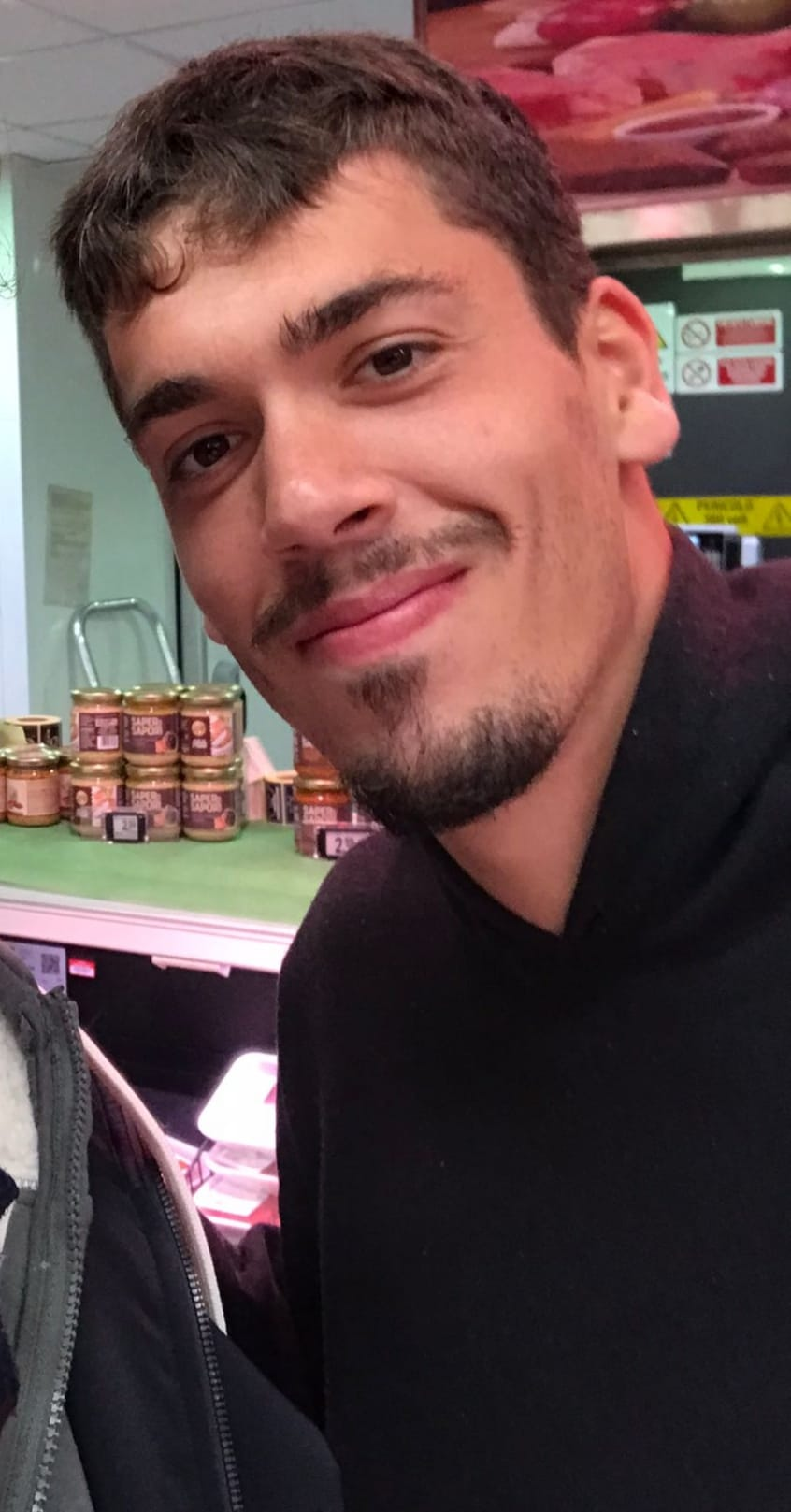

Personal information
- Full name: Joan González Cañellas
- Date of birth: 1 February 2002 (age 24)
- Place of birth: Barcelona, Spain
- Height: 1.90 m (6 ft 3 in)
- Position: Central midfielder

Youth career
- 2014–2019: Cornellà
- 2019–2021: Barcelona
- 2021–2022: Lecce

Senior career*
Years	Team	Apps	(Gls)
2022–2025	Lecce	64	(2)

International career
2024	Catalonia	1	(0)
- * Club domestic league appearances and goals

Joan González Cañellas (born 1 February 2002) is a Spanish former professional footballer who played as a central midfielder.

== Career ==
Born in Barcelona, Catalonia, González was a youth product of Cornellà and moved to the youth academy of Barcelona on 5 September 2019. On 19 August 2021, he moved to the youth academy of Lecce. He started training with the senior team of Lecce in the preseason in the summer of 2022, and was promoted to their squad ahead of their season in Serie A in 2022-23 after they achieved promotion.

González made his professional and Coppa Italia debut as a late substitute in a 1–1 tie (3–2 aggregate loss) against Cittadella on 5 August 2022.

In June 2025, Lecce announced that Joan González would not be able to continue playing football due to a congenital heart problem detected during the pre-season.

== Playing style ==
González was initially trained as a midfielder, before converting to a centre-back at Barcelona, and then back to midfield again at Lecce. He was adept at playmaking from the back with precise passes and often chose the best passing lane. He was able to play in a 2 or 3-man midfield, and was a great dribbler with a good sense of position.

== Career statistics ==
As of match played 27 November 2023

Appearances and goals by club, season and competition
Club	Season	League			National cup		Continental		Total	
Club	Season	Division	Apps	Goals	Apps	Goals	Apps	Goals	Apps	Goals
Lecce	2022–23	Serie A	35	1	1	0	—		36	1
Lecce	2023–24	Serie A	29	1	1	0	—		30	1
Lecce	2024–25	Serie A	0	0	0	0	—		0	0
Career total			64	2	2	0	0	0	66	2
