= Pablo Rodríguez (footballer, born 2001) =

Spanish footballer

Personal information
- Full name: Pablo Rodríguez Delgado
- Date of birth: 4 August 2001 (age 25)
- Place of birth: Las Palmas, Spain
- Height: 1.78 m (5 ft 10 in)
- Position: Attacking midfielder

Team information
- Current team: Lech Poznań
- Number: 21

Youth career
- 2010–2011: Valsequillo
- 2011–2016: Las Palmas
- 2016–2020: Real Madrid

Senior career*
Years	Team	Apps	(Gls)
2019–2020	Real Madrid B	11	(2)
2020–2025	Lecce	48	(8)
2023	→ Brescia (loan)	15	(3)
2023–2024	→ Ascoli (loan)	37	(4)
2024–2025	→ Racing Santander (loan)	34	(7)
2025–	Lech Poznań	39	(9)
2025–	Lech Poznań II	1	(0)
- * Club domestic league appearances and goals as of 11:05, 16 November 2026 (UTC)

Pablo Rodríguez Delgado (born 4 August 2001) is a Spanish professional footballer who plays as an attacking midfielder for Ekstraklasa club Lech Poznań.

== Career ==
=== Early life and youth career ===
Rodríguez was born on 4 August 2001 in Las Palmas. He started his youth career by joining the academy of UD Las Palmas in 2011. He later then joined the academy of Real Madrid CF on 2017 before moving on to Real Madrid Castilla.

=== Real Madrid Castilla ===
Rodríguez signed his first senior contract with the reserve side Spanish giants Real Madrid CF. He made his debut against Las Rozas CF on 25 August 2019 as a substitute for Juanmi Latasa in the 82nd minute of the game. The match ended in a 1–1 draw. Pablo scored his debut goal for the club in the next match against S.S. Reyes on 16 October 2019. Rodríguez came on as a substitute in the 76th minute for Jorge Martín Camuñas and scored during the stoppage time while the team was trailing 1–0. The match ended a 1–1 draw because of Pablo's goal. He scored his second goal for the club in the 2nd match against Las Rozas CF on 12 January 2020 while the team was trailing 1–0. The match ended in a 2–2 draw. He played his last match for the club against Pontevedra CF on 1 March 2020 as a substitute for Reinier in the 69th minute of the game. The match ended 4–0 with Real Madrid losing the match. He played 11 matches and scored twice during his time with the club.

=== Lecce ===
Rodríguez signed for the Italian side US Lecce, playing the 2020–21 Serie B. He made his debut for the club on 27 December 2020 in the match against L.R. Vicenza Virtus. He started in the match as a substitute for Mariusz Stępiński, and scored his debut goal in his debut match for the club during the 72nd minute of the game. The goal was a winner as Lecce won the match 2–1. His second goal came on his second appearance on 24 January against Empoli, as Lecce drew the match 2–2. Rodríguez scored his third goal for Lecce against Brescia Calcio on 9 February, which would also end in a 2–2 draw. He scored his fourth goal in the next match on 13 February against U.S. Cremonese in the 54th minute, which was a winner goal, as the match ended in a 1–2 win for Lecce.

On 20 January 2023, Rodríguez joined Serie B club Brescia on loan. On 10 August, he moved on a new loan to Ascoli, also in the second division.

On 2 August 2024, Rodríguez returned to Spain and moved to Segunda División side Racing de Santander on loan for the 2024–25 season.

=== Lech Poznań ===
On 18 July 2025, Rodríguez joined Polish club Lech Poznań on a four-year contract. He scored three goals and provided one assist in 27 league appearances as Lech won the 2025–26 Ekstraklasa title.

Rodríguez picked up his second piece of silverware at Lech on 16 July 2026, setting the score at 3–1 in the 2026 Polish Super Cup win over Górnik Zabrze. On 18 October, he scored two goals and made three assists in a 6–1 home victory over Korona Kielce.

== Career statistics ==
As of match played 5 November 2026

Appearances and goals by club, season and competition
Club	Season	League			National cup (Note: Includes Coppa Italia, Copa del Rey, Polish Cup)		Continental		Others		Total	
Club	Season	Division	Apps	Goals	Apps	Goals	Apps	Goals	Apps	Goals	Apps	Goals
Real Madrid Castilla	2019–20	Segunda División B	11	2	—		—		—		11	2
Lecce	2020–21	Serie B	19	6	0	0	—		1 (Note: Appearance in Serie B promotion play-offs)	0	20	6
Lecce	2021–22	Serie B	25	2	2	0	—		—		27	2
Lecce	2022–23	Serie A	4	0	0	0	—		—		4	0
Lecce	Total		48	8	2	0	0	0	1	0	51	8
Brescia (loan)	2022–23	Serie B	15	3	—		—		2 (Note: Appearances in Serie B relegation play-offs)	0	17	3
Ascoli (loan)	2023–24	Serie B	37	4	1	0	—		—		38	4
Racing Santander (loan)	2024–25	Segunda División	34	7	3	0	—		1 (Note: Appearance in Segunda División promotion play-offs)	0	38	7
Lech Poznań	2025–26	Ekstraklasa	27	3	3	0	12 (Note: Two appearances in UEFA Champions League, one appearance in UEFA Europa League, nine appearances and one goal in UEFA Conference League)	1	—		42	4
Lech Poznań	2026–27	Ekstraklasa	12	6	1	0	8 (Note: Two appearances in UEFA Champions League, eight appearances and one goal in UEFA Europa League)	1	1 (Note: Appearance in Polish Super Cup)	1	24	8
Lech Poznań	Total		39	9	4	0	22	2	1	1	66	12
Lech Poznań II	2025–26	III liga, group II	1	0	—		—		—		1	0
Career total			185	33	10	0	22	2	5	1	222	36

== Honours ==
Real Madrid

- UEFA Youth League: 2019–20

Lecce

- Serie B: 2021–22

Lech Poznań

- Ekstraklasa: 2025–26
- Polish Super Cup: 2026
