= Gabriel (footballer, born September 1992) =

Brazilian footballer

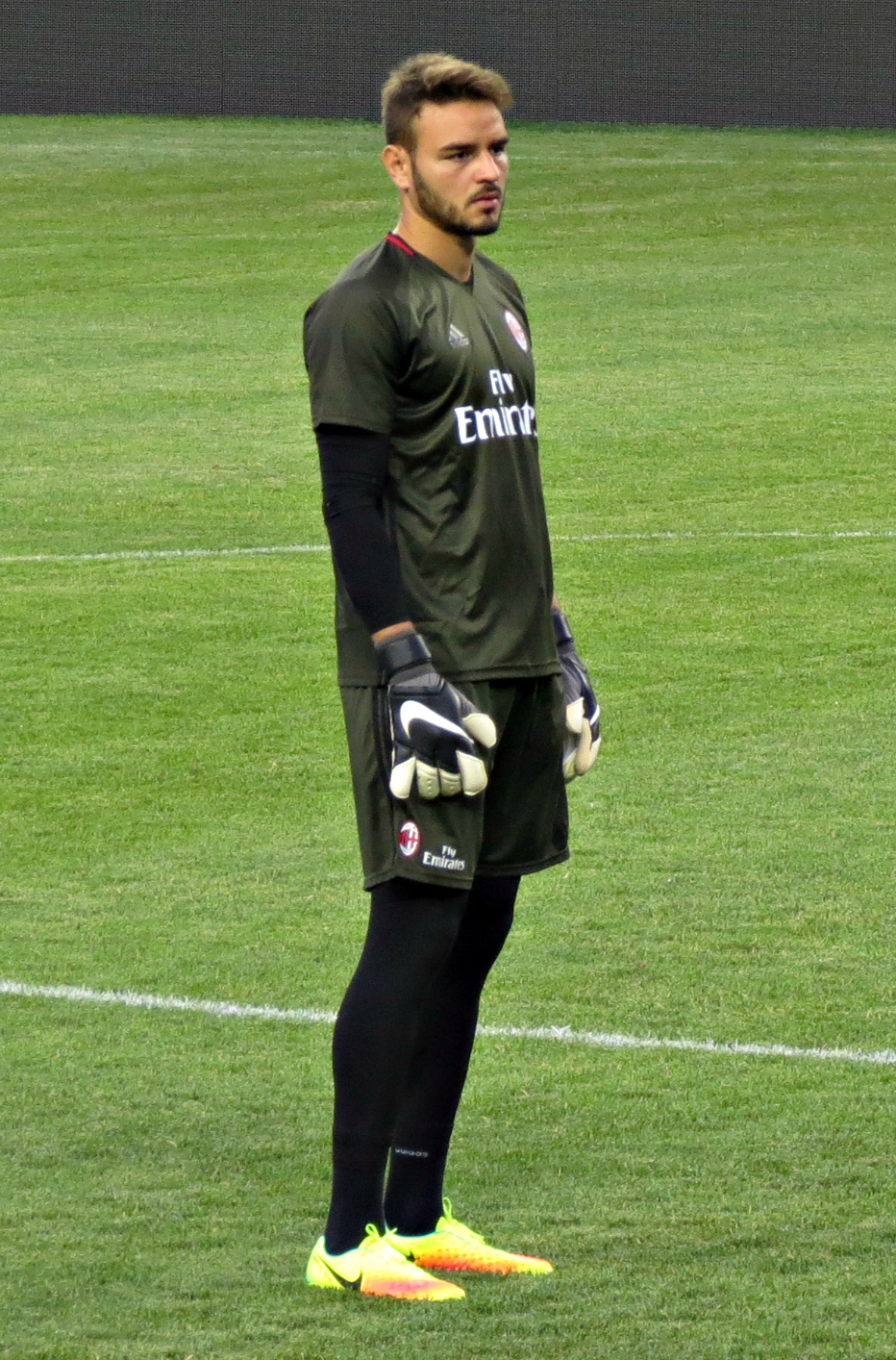
- Gabriel with AC Milan in 2016

Personal information
- Full name: Gabriel Vasconcelos Ferreira
- Date of birth: 27 September 1992 (age 34)
- Place of birth: Unaí, Minas Gerais, Brazil
- Height: 1.93 m (6 ft 4 in)
- Position: Goalkeeper

Team information
- Current team: Vitória
- Number: 22

Youth career
- 2007–2010: Cruzeiro

Senior career*
Years	Team	Apps	(Gls)
2010–2012	Cruzeiro	0	(0)
2012–2018	AC Milan	7	(0)
2014–2015	→ Carpi (loan)	39	(0)
2015–2016	→ Napoli (loan)	1	(0)
2017	→ Cagliari (loan)	3	(0)
2018	→ Empoli (loan)	16	(0)
2018–2019	Perugia	37	(0)
2019–2022	Lecce	103	(0)
2022–2025	Coritiba	58	(0)
2024	→ Juventude (loan)	39	(0)
2025–	Vitória	9	(0)
2025	→ Sport Recife (loan)	23	(0)

International career^{‡}
2011	Brazil U20	15	(0)
2012	Brazil U23	4	(0)
2012	Brazil	1	(0)
Medal record
Sport Recife
Representing Brazil
Men's Football
Silver medal – second place	2012 London	Team competition
- * Club domestic league appearances and goals as of 8 April 2026 ‡ National team caps and goals as of 28 June 2017

Gabriel Vasconcelos Ferreira (born 27 September 1992), usually known as Gabriel (Portuguese: [ɡabɾiˈew]) or Gabriel Vasconcelos, is a Brazilian professional footballer who plays as a goalkeeper for Vitória.

A product of Cruzeiro's youth system, Gabriel was signed by AC Milan at the age of 19. He has since spent time both at the club and on various loans.

At the international level, Gabriel made a single appearance for the Brazil national team in August 2012. Previously, he was part of the under-23 squad that won the silver medal at the 2012 Summer Olympics in London.

== Club career ==
=== Cruzeiro (2007–2012) ===
Gabriel started his footballing career in the youth teams of Cruzeiro in 2007. During the 2010 and 2011 seasons, he also featured as an unused substitute with the first team on four occasions, including one game of the 2011 Campeonato Mineiro, which Cruzeiro eventually won.

=== AC Milan (2012–2018) ===
==== Early seasons (2012–2014) ====
At the beginning of the 2012–13 season, Gabriel was signed by AC Milan to serve as backup for Christian Abbiati and Marco Amelia. After making no official appearances during his first year at the club, Gabriel's official debut came on 19 October 2013, as manager Massimiliano Allegri chose him to start in place of an injured Abbiati for a Serie A game at home against Udinese; the Brazilian kept a clean sheet in the 1–0 win. He finished his second season at Milan with seven appearances.

==== Loan spells (2014–2018) ====
On 1 September 2014, Gabriel joined Serie B side Carpi on a season-long loan from Milan. Serving as the first-choice goalkeeper, he played 39 league games out of 42, all as a starter, and contributed to the club's successful season, in which they finished at the top of the table and won their first-ever promotion to Serie A.

For the 2015–16 season, Gabriel moved to Serie A club Napoli, once again on a season-long loan. Serving as Pepe Reina's understudy, Gabriel finished the season with four appearances (one in the league, three in Europa League).

Gabriel went back to Milan for the 2016–17 season. However, being second-choice to Gianluigi Donnarumma, he didn't get any playing time in the competitive games during the first half of the season. In January 2017, he was loaned out to Cagliari for the rest of the season. However, he still didn't get regular playing time, making only three appearances.

After returning to Milan for the 2017–18 season, Gabriel once again failed to make any competitive appearance, having fallen back to fourth choice behind the Donnarumma brothers and Marco Storari. On 30 January 2018, he was loaned out to Serie B side Empoli for the remainder of the season.

=== Perugia ===
On 17 August 2018, Gabriel signed with Serie B club Perugia for free.

=== Lecce ===
On 3 July 2019, Gabriel signed with Serie A club U.S. Lecce a 2-years contract.

== International career ==
=== Brazil Under-20 ===
Gabriel was part of the Brazil under-20 squad that won the South American Youth Championship in February 2011, appearing in eight games out of nine.

The following August he was called up by manager Ney Franco to take part also in the FIFA under-20 World Cup. He played in all seven games as a starter, as Brazil claimed the trophy by defeating Portugal 3–2 in the final at El Campín stadium.

=== Brazil Under-23 ===
Gabriel was called up by Brazil under-23 to take part in the 2012 Olympic Football tournament as a replacement for the injured Rafael Cabral two days before the start of the competition. After remaining on the bench for the first two games, Gabriel made his debut in the tournament in the third and last match of the group stage against New Zealand, which Brazil won 3–0. He retained his place as a starter in each of the following three games, as Brazil went on to win the silver medal after being defeated 2–1 by Mexico in the final.

=== Brazil ===
Three days after playing in the Olympic final, on 15 August 2012, Gabriel made his senior debut for Brazil, featuring as a starter in a 3–0 friendly win over Sweden, having the distinction of playing his first professional match at full international level.

== Career statistics ==
=== Club ===
As of 24 March 2023

Appearances and goals by club, season and competition
Club	Season	League			State League		Cup		Continental		Other		Total	
Club	Season	Division	Apps	Goals	Apps	Goals	Apps	Goals	Apps	Goals	Apps	Goals	Apps	Goals
Cruzeiro	2010	Série A	0	0	—		0	0	0	0	—		0	0
Cruzeiro	2011	Série A	0	0	0	0	0	0	0	0	—		0	0
Cruzeiro	2012	Série A	0	0	0	0	0	0	0	0	—		0	0
Cruzeiro	Total		0	0	0	0	0	0	0	0	—		0	0
Milan	2012–13	Serie A	0	0	—		0	0	0	0	—		0	0
Milan	2013–14	Serie A	7	0	—		0	0	0	0	—		7	0
Milan	2016–17	Serie A	0	0	—		0	0	—		0	0	0	0
Milan	2017–18	Serie A	0	0	—		0	0	0	0	—		0	0
Milan	Total		7	0	—		0	0	0	0	0	0	7	0
Carpi (loan)	2014–15	Serie B	39	0	—		0	0	—		—		39	0
Napoli (loan)	2015–16	Serie A	1	0	—		0	0	3	0	—		4	0
Cagliari (loan)	2016–17	Serie A	3	0	—		0	0	—		—		3	0
Empoli (loan)	2017–18	Serie B	16	0	—		0	0	—		—		16	0
Perugia	2018–19	Serie B	36	0	—		0	0	—		1	0	37	0
Lecce	2019–20	Serie A	34	0	—		1	0	—		—		35	0
Lecce	2020–21	Serie B	40	0	—		0	0	—		—		40	0
Lecce	2021–22	Serie B	31	0	—		2	0	—		—		33	0
Lecce	Total		105	0	—		3	0	—		—		108	0
Coritiba	2022	Série A	13	0	—		—		—		—		13	0
Coritiba	2023	Série A	0	0	12	0	2	0	—		—		14	0
Coritiba	Total		13	0	12	0	2	0	—		—		27	0
Career total			220	0	12	0	5	0	3	0	1	0	241	0

== Honours ==
Cruzeiro

- Campeonato Mineiro: 2011

Carpi

- Serie B: 2014–15

Milan

- Supercoppa Italiana: 2016

Empoli

- Serie B: 2017–18

Brazil

- South American Youth Championship: 2011
- FIFA U-20 World Cup: 2011
- Olympic Silver Medal: 2012
