= Marcin Listkowski =

Polish footballer

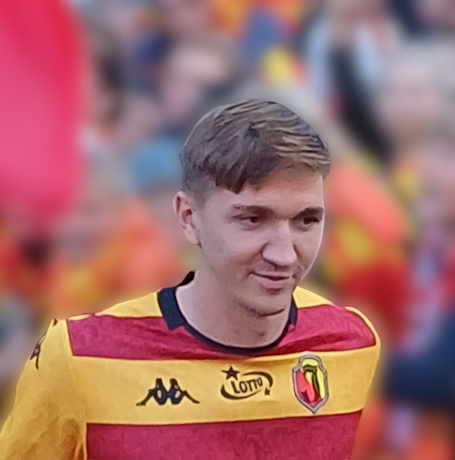
- Listkowski in 2025 with Jagiellonia Białystok

Personal information
- Date of birth: 10 February 1998 (age 28)
- Place of birth: Rypin, Poland
- Height: 1.79 m (5 ft 10 in)
- Positions: Attacking midfielder; forward

Team information
- Current team: Stal Rzeszów
- Number: 29

Youth career
- –2014: Lech Rypin

Senior career*
Years	Team	Apps	(Gls)
2014–2018	Pogoń Szczecin II	36	(4)
2015–2020	Pogoń Szczecin	97	(2)
2018–2019	→ Raków Częstochowa (loan)	25	(3)
2020–2024	Lecce	45	(2)
2023	→ Brescia (loan)	14	(1)
2024	→ Lecco (loan)	10	(0)
2024–2026	Jagiellonia Białystok	13	(0)
2024–2026	Jagiellonia Białystok II	9	(1)
2025	→ Zagłębie Lubin (loan)	6	(0)
2026	GKS Tychy	11	(0)
2026–	Stal Rzeszów	5	(1)

International career
2014	Poland U16	3	(0)
2014–2015	Poland U17	13	(3)
2015	Poland U18	4	(1)
2015–2017	Poland U19	15	(2)
2017–2019	Poland U20	4	(0)
2019–2020	Poland U21	8	(0)
- * Club domestic league appearances and goals as of 17:55, 28 August 2026 (UTC)

Marcin Listkowski (born 10 February 1998) is a Polish professional footballer who plays as an attacking midfielder or forward for I liga club Stal Rzeszów.

== Club career ==
On 26 August 2020, Listkowski signed a five-year contract with Italian club Lecce.

On 26 January 2023, Listkowski was loaned to Brescia, with an option to buy.

On 18 January 2024, he joined Lecco on loan until the end of the season.

On 20 August 2024, Lecce announced his permanent transfer to Ekstraklasa champions Jagiellonia Białystok. On 21 February 2025, Listkowki was sent on loan to another Ekstraklasa club Zagłębie Lubin for the rest of the season.

On 12 January 2026, Listkowski's contract with Jagiellonia was terminated by mutual consent. The following day, he signed an eighteen-month deal with I liga club GKS Tychy.

On 24 June 2026, he signed a two-year deal with Stal Rzeszów in the second tier.

== Career statistics ==
As of match played 24 May 2026

Appearances and goals by club, season and competition
Club	Season	League			National cup (Note: Includes Polish Cup, Coppa Italia)		Europe		Total	
Club	Season	Division	Apps	Goals	Apps	Goals	Apps	Goals	Apps	Goals
Pogoń Szczecin II	2013–14	III liga, group D	5	1	—		—		5	1
Pogoń Szczecin II	2014–15	III liga, group D	11	1	—		—		11	1
Pogoń Szczecin II	2015–16	III liga, group D	3	0	—		—		3	0
Pogoń Szczecin II	2016–17	III liga, group II	8	1	—		—		8	1
Pogoń Szczecin II	2017–18	III liga, group II	9	1	—		—		9	1
Pogoń Szczecin II	Total		36	4	—		—		36	4
Pogoń Szczecin	2014–15	Ekstraklasa	2	0	0	0	—		2	0
Pogoń Szczecin	2015–16	Ekstraklasa	24	0	0	0	—		24	0
Pogoń Szczecin	2016–17	Ekstraklasa	17	0	2	0	—		19	0
Pogoń Szczecin	2017–18	Ekstraklasa	20	0	1	0	—		21	0
Pogoń Szczecin	2018–19	Ekstraklasa	2	0	0	0	—		2	0
Pogoń Szczecin	2019–20	Ekstraklasa	32	2	1	0	—		33	2
Pogoń Szczecin	Total		97	2	4	0	—		101	2
Raków Częstochowa (loan)	2018–19	I liga	25	3	5	0	—		30	3
Lecce	2020–21	Serie B	16	0	1	0	—		17	0
Lecce	2021–22	Serie B	23	2	2	1	—		25	3
Lecce	2022–23	Serie A	5	0	1	0	—		6	0
Lecce	2023–24	Serie A	1	0	0	0	—		1	0
Lecce	Total		45	2	4	1	—		49	3
Brescia (loan)	2018–19	Serie B	14	1	—		—		14	1
Lecco (loan)	2023–24	Serie B	10	0	—		—		10	0
Jagiellonia Białystok	2024–25	Ekstraklasa	13	0	1	0	4 (Note: Appearances in UEFA Conference League)	0	18	0
Jagiellonia Białystok	2025–26	Ekstraklasa	0	0	0	0	0	0	0	0
Jagiellonia Białystok	Total		13	0	1	0	4	0	18	0
Jagiellonia Białystok II	2024–25	III liga, group I	1	1	—		—		1	1
Jagiellonia Białystok II	2025–26	III liga, group I	8	0	—		—		8	0
Jagiellonia Białystok II	Total		9	1	—		—		9	1
Zagłębie Lubin (loan)	2024–25	Ekstraklasa	6	0	—		—		6	0
GKS Tychy	2025–26	I liga	11	0	—		—		11	0
Stal Rzeszów	2026–27	I liga	0	0	0	0	—		0	0
Career total			266	13	14	1	4	0	284	14

== Honours ==
Raków Częstochowa

- I liga: 2018–19

Lecce

- Serie B: 2021–22

Individual

- I liga Team of the Season: 2018–19
