= Kastriot Dermaku =

Albanian footballer (born 1992)

Personal information
- Full name: Kastriot Dermaku
- Date of birth: 15 January 1992 (age 34)
- Place of birth: Scandiano, Italy
- Height: 1.95 m (6 ft 5 in)
- Position: Defender

Youth career
- 2006–2010: Sassuolo
- 2010–2011: Melfi

Senior career*
Years	Team	Apps	(Gls)
2011–2015	Melfi	104	(7)
2015–2017	Empoli	0	(0)
2015–2016	→ Pavia (loan)	13	(0)
2016–2017	→ Lucchese (loan)	38	(2)
2017–2019	Cosenza	64	(2)
2019–2020	Parma	18	(0)
2020–2024	Lecce	27	(2)

International career^{‡}
2013	Albania U21	1	(0)
2018–2021	Albania	13	(1)
- * Club domestic league appearances and goals as of 4 November 2022 ‡ National team caps and goals as of 15 November 2021

Kastriot Dermaku (born 15 January 1992) is a former professional footballer who played as a defender. Born in Italy, he represented Albania internationally.

== Early life ==
Dermaku was born in Scandiano, in the northeast part of Italy. He is the son of Luan Dermaku, former professional footballer who played as a forward for Prishtina during Fadil Vokrri's era.

== Club career ==
=== Melfi ===
Dermaku emerged to the senior team in the beginning of the 2011–12 season, where he made his professional debut on 30 October 2011 in the matchday 13 against Celano, playing the last 13 minutes of a 4–0 home triumph. Later on 4 December, Dermaku made his second appearance of the season as well as his first start in a 3–1 away defeat to Paganese. He finished his first senior season by making eight league appearances, as Federiciani finished the season in 16th position in Lega Pro 2.

In his last season the 2014–15, Dermaku was named as a team captain. On 1 April 2015, Dermaku made his 100th league appearance for the club by scoring in Melfi's 2–3 away win over Casertana.

=== Empoli ===
On 15 May 2015, Dermaku completed a transfer to Empoli by penning a three-year contract with the Serie A club. He was seen as a replacement for Daniele Rugani which left for Juventus.

=== Cosenza ===
On 31 August 2017, after he become a free agent following the departure from Empoli, Dermaku joined Cosenza on a two-year contract. He made his debut for the club on 9 September in the goalless draw against Matera, while his first goal came on 31 March of the following year in the 2–1 win at Juve Stabia. Dermaku concluded his first season by making 40 appearances in Serie C, all of them as starter, collecting 3555 minutes; Rossoblù achieved their promotion to Serie B for the first time in 15 years.

Even after the club returned in Serie B, Dermaku was able to retain his place in the starting lineup, making 33 appearances in the 2018–19 season. His debut in the league came in the opening matchday against Ascoli which ended in a 1–1 draw at Stadio Cino e Lillo Del Duca. On 22 April 2019, he scored his first Serie B goal, the winner against Spezia at home.

Following the end of the season, Dermaku become free agent after his contract expired and he decided not to renew it. He concluded his spell with Cosenza by 79 matches between league and cup, scoring twice in the process.

=== Parma ===
On 7 July 2019, Dermaku signed a four-year contract with top flight side Parma.

=== Lecce ===
On 5 October 2020, he was loaned to Lecce for the 2020–21 season. On 30 August 2021, he moved to Lecce on a permanent basis and signed a three-year contract.

== International career ==
=== Albania ===
==== Under-21 ====
On 30 January 2013, Dermaku received a call-up from Albania U21 for the friendly match against Macedonia U21 and made his debut after coming on as a substitute at 66th minute in place of Gentian Durak.

=== Kosovo ===
On 31 August 2018, Dermaku received a call-up from Kosovo for the 2018–19 UEFA Nations League matches against Azerbaijan and Faroe Islands, he was an unused bench in the first match. On 9 September 2018, Dermaku left from the gathering with Kosovo after he was not named in the starting line-up in the match against Faroe Islands and he opted to represent Albania instead.

=== Return to Albania ===
On 2 October 2018, Dermaku received a call-up from Albania for the friendly match against Jordan and 2018–19 UEFA Nations League match against Israel. One week later, he received Albanian citizenship and became eligible to play for the national side. In the next day, he made his debut for Albania in the first match against Jordan after coming on as a substitute at 56th minute in place of Mërgim Mavraj.

== Career statistics ==
=== Club ===
As of match played 4 November 2022

Appearances and goals by club, season and competition
Club	Season	League			Cup		Continental		Other		Total	
Club	Season	Division	Apps	Goals	Apps	Goals	Apps	Goals	Apps	Goals	Apps	Goals
Melfi	2011–12	Lega Pro Seconda Divisione	8	0	0	0	—		—		8	0
Melfi	2012–13	Lega Pro Seconda Divisione	30	2	0	0	—		—		30	2
Melfi	2013–14	Lega Pro Seconda Divisione	31	2	0	0	—		—		31	2
Melfi	2014–15	Lega Pro	35	3	0	0	—		—		35	3
Melfi	Total		104	7	0	0	0	0	0	0	104	7
Empoli	2015–16	Serie A	0	0	0	0	—		—		0	0
Pavia (loan)	2015–16	Lega Pro	13	0	0	0	—		—		13	0
Lucchese (loan)	2016–17	Lega Pro	38	2	0	0	—		—		38	2
Cosenza	2017–18	Serie C	40	1	4 (Note: Appearances in Coppa Italia Serie C)	0	—		—		44	1
Cosenza	2018–19	Serie B	33	1	2	0	—		—		35	1
Cosenza	Total		73	2	6	0	0	0	0	0	79	2
Parma	2019–20	Serie A	16	0	3	0	—		—		19	0
Parma	2020–21	Serie A	2	0	0	0	—		—		2	0
Parma	Total		18	0	3	0	0	0	0	0	21	0
Lecce	2020–21	Serie B	13	1	0	0	—		—		13	1
Lecce	2021–22	Serie B	15	1	2	0	—		—		17	1
Lecce	2022–23	Serie A	1	0	1	0	—		—		2	0
Lecce	Total		29	2	3	0	0	0	0	0	32	2
Career total			275	13	12	0	0	0	0	0	287	13

=== International ===
As of match played 15 November 2021

Appearances and goals by national team and year
National team	Year	Apps	Goals
Albania
Albania	2018	2	0
Albania	2019	5	1
Albania	2020	4	0
Albania	2021	2	0
Total		13	1

Scores and results list Albania's goal tally first, score column indicates score after each Dermaku goal.

List of international goals scored by Kastriot Dermaku
No.	Date	Venue	Cap	Opponent	Score	Result	Competition
1	10 September 2019	Elbasan Arena, Elbasan, Albania	4	Iceland	1–0	4–2	UEFA Euro 2020 qualifying
