= Lorenzo Colombo =

Italian footballer (born 2002)

Personal information
- Date of birth: 8 March 2002 (age 24)
- Place of birth: Vimercate, Italy
- Height: 1.86 m (6 ft 1 in)
- Position: Forward

Team information
- Current team: Genoa
- Number: 29

Youth career
- 2010–2020: AC Milan

Senior career*
Years	Team	Apps	(Gls)
2020–2026	AC Milan	5	(0)
2021	→ Cremonese (loan)	13	(1)
2021–2022	→ SPAL (loan)	34	(6)
2022–2023	→ Lecce (loan)	33	(5)
2023–2024	→ Monza (loan)	25	(4)
2024–2025	→ Empoli (loan)	37	(6)
2025–2026	→ Genoa (loan)	38	(7)
2026–	Genoa	8	(0)

International career^{‡}
2017	Italy U15	4	(2)
2017	Italy U16	1	(0)
2018–2019	Italy U17	20	(6)
2020	Italy U19	1	(0)
2021	Italy U20	1	(0)
2021–2023	Italy U21	20	(4)
Medal record
Men's football
Representing Italy
UEFA European Under-17 Championship
Silver medal – second place	2018 England
- * Club domestic league appearances and goals as of 1 November 2026 ‡ National team caps and goals as of 8 September 2023

Lorenzo Colombo (born 8 March 2002) is an Italian professional footballer who plays as a forward for Serie A club Genoa. He is a former Italian youth international.

== Club career ==
=== AC Milan ===
Born in Vimercate near Milan, Colombo is a product of the youth academy of AC Milan. His goal tally in the club's youth teams led to him making his debut for the Primavera (under-19) side at the age of 15. Due to minor injuries, his time in the Primavera was cut short.

Due to the COVID-19 pandemic in 2020, the AC Milan first team's lack of striking options meant they were unable to cope with the busy schedule after football resumed, and Colombo was promoted to the senior side. He made his first-team debut, aged 18, on 12 June 2020, replacing Lucas Paquetá after 82 minutes in a 0−0 draw at home to Juventus in the Coppa Italia. He made his Serie A debut in a 5−1 home win against Bologna on 18 July 2020.

On 5 September 2020, Colombo scored his first senior goal in a 4–1 win against Monza in a friendly match. On 24 September 2020, he scored his first goal in official competition, during a Europa League match against Norwegian club FK Bodø/Glimt.

==== Loan to Cremonese ====
On 26 January 2021, Colombo joined Serie B club Cremonese on a six-month loan, until the end of the season.

==== Loan to SPAL ====
On 31 July 2021, he was sent to Serie B club SPAL on a one-year loan.

==== Loan to Lecce ====
On 7 July 2022, Colombo joined recently promoted Serie A club Lecce on a one-year loan, with an option to be signed permanently.

==== Loan to Monza ====
On 1 September 2023, he moved on a one-year loan to fellow Serie A club Monza.

==== Loan to Empoli ====
On 31 July 2024, Colombo joined fellow Serie A club Empoli on a season long loan with the option to make the deal permanent.

==== Loan to Genoa ====
On 28 July 2025, he joined fellow Serie A club Genoa on a one-year loan, with the obligation to make the deal permanent under certain conditions.

=== Genoa ===
In May 2026, Genoa signed Colombo permanently, ahead of the 2026–27 season.

== International career ==
Colombo played for the Italy U17 and the Italy U19 side.

He made his debut with the Italy U21 on 30 March 2021, playing as a substitute during the group stage match of the 2021 UEFA European Under-21 Championship won 4–0 against Slovenia in Maribor.

== Career statistics ==
As of match played 16 August 2026

Appearances and goals by club, season and competition
Club	Season	League			Coppa Italia		Europe		Total	
Club	Season	Division	Apps	Goals	Apps	Goals	Apps	Goals	Apps	Goals
AC Milan	2019–20	Serie A	1	0	1	0	—		2	0
AC Milan	2020–21	Serie A	4	0	0	0	5 (Note: Appearances in UEFA Europa League)	1	9	1
AC Milan	Total		5	0	1	0	5	1	11	1
Cremonese (loan)	2020–21	Serie B	13	1	0	0	—		13	1
SPAL (loan)	2021–22	Serie B	34	6	1	0	—		35	6
Lecce (loan)	2022–23	Serie A	33	5	1	1	—		34	6
Monza (loan)	2023–24	Serie A	25	4	0	0	—		25	4
Empoli (loan)	2024–25	Serie A	37	6	5	1	—		42	7
Genoa (loan)	2025–26	Serie A	37	7	2	0	—		39	7
Genoa	2026–27	Serie A	0	0	1	1	—		1	1
Genoa	Total		37	7	3	1	0	0	40	8
Career total			184	29	11	3	5	1	200	33

== Honours ==
Individual

- Serie A Goal of the Month: August 2022
