= Federico Baschirotto =

Italian footballer

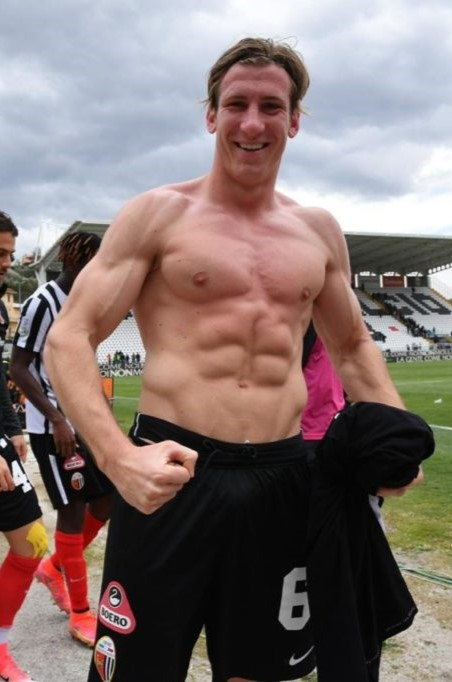
- Baschirotto with Ascoli in 2021

Personal information
- Date of birth: 20 September 1996 (age 30)
- Place of birth: Isola della Scala, Italy
- Height: 1.87 m (6 ft 2 in)
- Position: Centre-back

Team information
- Current team: Cremonese
- Number: 6

Youth career
- 2014–2015: Cremonese

Senior career*
Years	Team	Apps	(Gls)
2013–2014	Legnago	30	(0)
2015–2019	Cremonese	0	(0)
2015–2016	→ Seregno (loan)	34	(1)
2016–2017	→ Forlì (loan)	10	(0)
2017–2018	→ Cuneo (loan)	23	(1)
2018–2019	→ Vigor Carpaneto (loan)	32	(2)
2019–2021	Viterbese Castrense	58	(4)
2021–2022	Ascoli	30	(4)
2022–2025	Lecce	112	(5)
2025–	Cremonese	29	(2)
- * Club domestic league appearances and goals as of 25 May 2026

Federico Baschirotto (born 20 September 1996) is an Italian professional footballer who plays as a centre-back for Serie B club Cremonese and the Italy national team.

== Club career ==
A robust centre-back, Baschirotto made his Serie C debut for Forlì on 27 August 2016 in a game against Venezia.

On 27 July 2021, he joined Serie B side Ascoli.

On 12 July 2022, he was signed by newly-promoted Serie A club Lecce. In his first season in the Italian top flight, Baschirotto emerged as one of the strongest and most effective centre backs in the league, playing 36 games out of 38 and forming a defensive partnership with 2018 FIFA World Cup winner Samuel Umtiti that turned out to be effective to save Lecce from relegation despite having the lowest salary amount in the Serie A. After winning coverage through his performances, Baschirotto was also covered consistently by the media for his strong physical appearance and attitude.

On 29 July 2025, Baschirotto returned to Cremonese.

== International career ==
On 29 May 2023, Baschirotto was called up by Italy national football team manager Roberto Mancini to join the Azzurri training camp in preparation for the upcoming 2023 UEFA Nations League Finals.
