= Sergio Maselli =

Italian footballer

Personal information
- Date of birth: 6 April 2001 (age 25)
- Place of birth: Putignano, Italy
- Height: 1.75 m (5 ft 9 in)
- Position: Midfielder

Team information
- Current team: Picerno
- Number: 34

Youth career
- –2018: Bari
- 2018–2019: Lecce

Senior career*
Years	Team	Apps	(Gls)
2019–2022	Lecce	6	(0)
2021–2022	→ Foggia (loan)	11	(0)
2022–2024	Juve Stabia	28	(1)
2024–2025	Giugliano	28	(1)
2025–	Picerno	23	(0)
- * Club domestic league appearances and goals as of 10 November 2025

Sergio Maselli (born 6 April 2001) is an Italian professional footballer who plays as a midfielder for Serie C Group C club Picerno.

== Career ==
He joined the youth teams of Lecce in the summer of 2018. He made his debut for the senior squad of Lecce on 4 December 2019 in a Coppa Italia game against SPAL. He substituted Simone Lo Faso in the 75th minute of a 1–5 away loss. For the remainder of the 2019–20 season, he was a member of the senior squad, but remained on the bench in all games and did not make his Serie A debut as Lecce was relegated to Serie B.

He made his Serie B debut for Lecce on 3 October 2020 in a game against Ascoli. He substituted Žan Majer in the 70th minute.

On 9 August 2021, he joined Serie C club Foggia on a season-long loan.

On 6 July 2022, Maselli signed with Juve Stabia.
