= Massimiliano Busellato =

Italian footballer (born 1993)

Personal information
- Date of birth: 23 April 1993 (age 33)
- Place of birth: Bassano del Grappa, Italy
- Height: 1.65 m (5 ft 5 in)
- Position: Midfielder

Youth career
- Cittadella

Senior career*
Years	Team	Apps	(Gls)
2011–2017	Cittadella	115	(6)
2015–2016	→ Ternana (loan)	36	(1)
2016–2017	→ Salernitana (loan)	25	(2)
2017–2018	Bari	26	(0)
2018–2019	Foggia	25	(0)
2019–2021	Pescara	54	(5)
2021–2023	Padova	18	(0)

International career
2012	Italy U19	5	(2)
2012–2014	Italy U20	5	(0)
2014	Italy U21	1	(0)
- * Club domestic league appearances and goals as of 22 April 2023

Massimiliano Busellato (born 23 April 1993) is an Italian footballer who plays as a midfielder.

== Club career ==
A Cittadella youth product, Busellato made his first-team debut on 15 October 2011, starting in a 2–0 home success over Grosseto. On 14 January of the following year he scored his first professional goal, netting his side's only of a 1–1 draw at AlbinoLeffe.

On 13 August 2015 Busellato was signed by Ternana in a temporary deal.

On 4 August 2018 he signed with Serie B club Foggia.

On 19 July 2019, Busellato signed to Pescara for free. He left the club at the end of the season.

On 1 September 2021, he joined to Padova.
