= Žan Majer =

Slovenian footballer (born 1992)

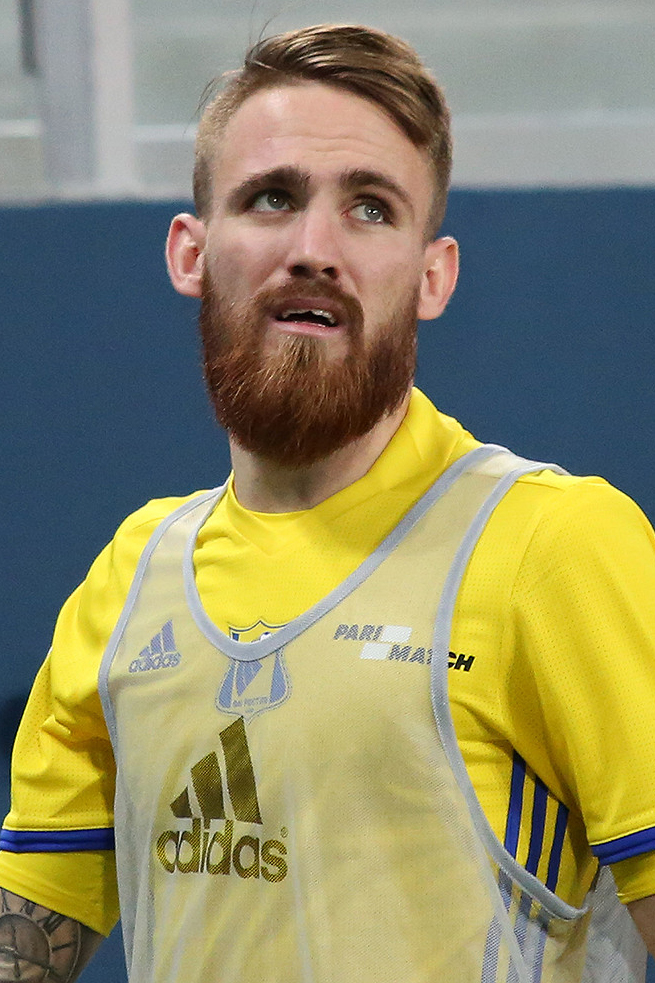
- Majer with Rostov in 2017

Personal information
- Date of birth: 25 July 1992 (age 34)
- Place of birth: Maribor, Slovenia
- Height: 1.80 m (5 ft 11 in)
- Position: Midfielder

Youth career
- 1998–2003: Lenart
- 2003–2006: Jarenina
- 2006–2007: Maribor
- 2007–2010: Jarenina
- 2011: Aluminij

Senior career*
Years	Team	Apps	(Gls)
2011–2012	Aluminij	11	(0)
2012–2017	Domžale	130	(7)
2017–2019	Rostov	13	(0)
2019–2022	Lecce	98	(7)
2022–2023	Reggina	31	(1)
2023–2025	Cremonese	42	(0)
2025–2026	Mantova	7	(0)
2026	→ Ternana (loan)	13	(2)

International career
2013–2014	Slovenia U21	9	(2)
2017	Slovenia B	2	(0)
2018–2019	Slovenia	2	(0)
- * Club domestic league appearances and goals as of 1 September 2026

Žan Majer (born 25 July 1992) is a Slovenian professional footballer who plays as a central midfielder.

== Club career ==
On 26 June 2017, Majer signed a three-year contract with one-year extension option with the Russian Premier League club Rostov. On 1 February 2019, Majer was released from his Rostov contract by mutual consent.

On 20 February 2019, he joined the Serie B team Lecce on a six-month deal. He made his Serie B debut on 23 February against Cittadella.

On 31 July 2022, Majer signed a multi-year contract with Reggina.

On 1 September 2023, Majer joined Cremonese on a two-year contract.

On 8 July 2025, Majer moved to Mantova on a two-season contract. On 20 January 2026, Majer was loaned to Ternana in the third-tier Serie C, with an obligation to buy in case of Ternana's promotion to Serie B.

== International career ==
Majer made two appearances for Slovenia, in 2018 against Montenegro and in 2019 against Latvia.

== Career statistics ==
=== Club ===
As of match played 6 May 2022

Appearances and goals by club, season and competition
Club	Season	League			National cup		Continental		Other		Total	
Club	Season	Division	Apps	Goals	Apps	Goals	Apps	Goals	Apps	Goals	Apps	Goals
Aluminij	2010–11	Slovenian Second League	2	0	0	0	—		—		2	0
Aluminij	2011–12	Slovenian Second League	9	0	0	0	—		—		9	0
Aluminij	Total		11	0	0	0	0	0	0	0	11	0
Domžale	2012–13	Slovenian PrvaLiga	21	1	0	0	—		—		21	1
Domžale	2013–14	Slovenian PrvaLiga	24	2	3	0	2 (Note: Appearances in UEFA Europa League)	0	—		29	2
Domžale	2014–15	Slovenian PrvaLiga	32	0	4	0	—		—		36	0
Domžale	2015–16	Slovenian PrvaLiga	29	1	4	0	2	0	—		35	1
Domžale	2016–17	Slovenian PrvaLiga	24	3	4	2	6	2	—		34	7
Domžale	Total		130	7	15	2	10	2	0	0	155	11
Rostov	2017–18	Russian Premier League	13	0	2	0	—		—		15	0
Rostov	2018–19	Russian Premier League	0	0	2	0	—		—		2	0
Rostov	Total		13	0	4	0	0	0	0	0	17	0
Lecce	2018–19	Serie B	11	0	0	0	—		—		11	0
Lecce	2019–20	Serie A	27	1	2	1	—		—		29	2
Lecce	2020–21	Serie B	36	3	1	0	—		2 (Note: Appearances in Serie B promotion play-offs)	0	39	3
Lecce	2021–22	Serie B	24	3	1	0	—		—		25	3
Lecce	Total		98	7	4	1	0	0	2	0	104	8
Career total			252	14	23	3	10	2	2	0	287	19
