= John Björkengren =

Swedish footballer (born 1998)

Personal information
- Full name: John Gunnar Björkengren
- Date of birth: 9 December 1998 (age 27)
- Place of birth: Falkenberg, Sweden
- Height: 1.80 m (5 ft 11 in)
- Position: Midfielder

Team information
- Current team: Randers
- Number: 6

Youth career
- Morups IF
- Falkenbergs FF

Senior career*
Years	Team	Apps	(Gls)
2017–2020	Falkenbergs FF	91	(10)
2020–2023	Lecce	48	(2)
2023	→ Brescia (loan)	19	(0)
2023–	Randers	89	(5)

International career
2017	Sweden U19	2	(0)
2019–2020	Sweden U21	8	(0)
- * Club domestic league appearances and goals as of 19 May 2026

John Gunnar Björkengren (born 9 December 1998) is a Swedish professional footballer who plays as a midfielder for Randers FC.

== Club career ==
Björkengren joined Falkenbergs FF at the age of 13 from Morups IF. In January 2017 he was promoted to the first team and signed his first professional contract with the club; a three year contract. He made his senior debut in the Superettan on 27 August 2017 in a 5-1 win over IF Brommapojkarna. In December the same year he extended his contract until 2020.

On 4 October 2020 he joined the Italian Serie B club US Lecce on a four year contract, plus as obtional extra year.

On 18 January 2023, joined Brescia on loan with an option to buy. After returning from loan, Björkengren was sold to Danish Superliga club Randers FC, signing a deal until June 2027.

== Career statistics ==
=== Club ===
As of match played 29 September 2024

Club	Season	League			National Cup (Note: Includes Svenska Cupen, Coppa Italia, Danish Cup)		Other		Total	
Club	Season	Division	Apps	Goals	Apps	Goals	Apps	Goals	Apps	Goals
Falkenberg	2017	Superettan	17	2	2	0	—		19	2
Falkenberg	2018	Superettan	25	5	0	0	—		25	5
Falkenberg	2019	Allsvenskan	28	2	3	0	—		31	2
Falkenberg	2020	Allsvenskan	21	1	4	0	—		25	1
Falkenberg	Total		91	10	9	0	0	0	100	10
Lecce	2020-21	Serie B	25	1	1	0	1 (Note: Appearance(s) in Serie B Promotion play-offs)	0	27	1
Lecce	2021-22	Serie B	22	1	3	0	—		25	1
Lecce	2022-23	Serie A	0	0	0	0	—		0	0
Lecce	Total		47	2	4	0	1	0	52	2
Brescia (loan)	2022-23	Serie B	19	0	0	0	—		19	0
Randers	2023-24	Danish Superliga	28	2	1	0	1 (Note: Appearance(s) in Danish Superliga European play-offs)	0	30	2
Randers	2024-25	Danish Superliga	10	1	1	0	—		11	1
Randers	Total		38	3	2	0	1	0	41	3
Career total			195	15	15	0	2	0	212	15
