= Fabio Lucioni =

Italian footballer

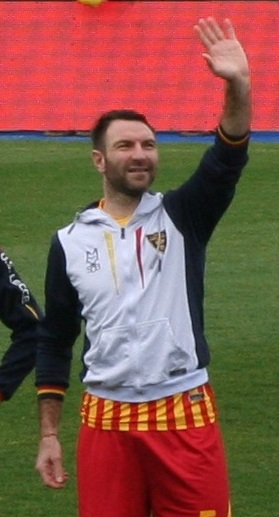

Personal information
- Full name: Fabio Lucioni
- Date of birth: 25 September 1987 (age 39)
- Place of birth: Terni, Italy
- Height: 1.86 m (6 ft 1 in)
- Position: Defender

Youth career
- Ternana

Senior career*
Years	Team	Apps	(Gls)
2006–2008	Ternana	13	(0)
2008	→ Monopoli (loan)	7	(1)
2008–2009	Noicattaro	29	(6)
2009–2010	Ternana	0	(6)
2010	Gela	15	(0)
2010–2012	Siena	0	(0)
2010–2011	→ Barletta (loan)	32	(3)
2011–2012	→ Spezia (loan)	31	(2)
2012–2014	Reggina	48	(2)
2014–2018	Benevento	117	(5)
2018–2023	Lecce	135	(6)
2022–2023	→ Frosinone (loan)	31	(4)
2023–2024	Palermo	23	(2)
2025	Frosinone	8	(0)
- * Club domestic league appearances and goals as of 17 May 2025

Fabio Lucioni (born 25 September 1987) is an Italian footballer who plays as a defender.

== Career ==
=== Ternana, loans and Gela ===
Born in Terni, Umbria, Lucioni started his career at hometown club Ternana. In January 2008, he was loaned to Lega Pro Seconda Divisione (Serie C2) clubs, namely Monopoli and Noicattaro. After 6 months at Ternana without a league appearance, he left for Gela along with Salvatore Ricca in January 2010. Gela signed Lucioni outright and Ricca on a temporary deal. Lucioni made 15 appearances for Gela.

=== Siena, Barletta and loans ===
In July 2010, he was signed by Serie B team Siena for €25,000 and farmed to third division club Barletta in a co-ownership deal, for a peppercorn fee of €500. On 23 June 2011, Siena bought back Lucioni also for €500. However, as Siena was promoted back to Serie A, Lucioni failed to enter first team.

On 22 July 2011, Lucioni joined another third division club Spezia Calcio on a temporary deal. He won the Supercoppa di Lega di Prima Divisione against his former club Ternana as well as promotion to Serie B.

On 5 July 2012, he was named in the 28-man pre-season squad for Siena. However, on 20 July he left the Serie A club altogether.

=== Reggina ===
On 20 July 2012, Reggina Calcio signed Lucioni to a new co-ownership deal, for a peppercorn of €250. He wore the no. 6 shirt, which was vacated by Antonio Giosa. He played 11 times in his second Serie B season. In June 2013, Siena gave up their chance to buy back the other 50% of Lucioni's registration rights from Reggina.

The next season he swapped his previous no. 6 for the number 5 jersey, which had been vacated by Gianluca Freddi.

=== Benevento ===
Lucioni joined Benevento in 2014. After collecting 36 appearances in the 2014–15 Serie C season, he became the team captain in 2015–16, when he gained promotion to Serie B for the first time in the club's history. He captained his team to another historic promotion, this time to Serie A, in 2016–17, netting 3 goals in the process.

He was alleged to have failed a doping test in September 2017, shortly after Benevento's 1–0 Serie A defeat to Torino; with the defender having tested positive for a banned substance. An Anabolic steroid, known as Clostebol was detected in the sample Lucioni provided. Following this, in January 2018 the Benevento captain was suspended by NADO (Italy's National Anti-Doping Organization). Finally, he was disqualified for one year from the sport.

=== Lecce ===
On 20 July 2018 he joined Lecce on a permanent basis. In August 2018 the doping ban was reduced and Lucioni could return to the pitch, making his debut with his new team on 27 August at Stadio Ciro Vigorito, facing his former team Benevento. At the beginning of the 2021–22 season, he assumed the captaincy after Marco Mancosu left the club.

==== Loan to Frosinone ====
On 25 June 2022, Lucioni moved on loan to Frosinone. With Frosinone, he won the Serie B title and his personal third promotion to Serie A in his career.

=== Palermo ===
On 26 June 2023, Palermo announced the signing of Lucioni on a two-year contract. On 20 November 2024, the contract was terminated by mutual consent.

=== Return to Frosinone ===
On 3 February 2025, Lucioni returned to Serie B club Frosinone.

== Honours ==
Spezia

- Supercoppa di Lega di Prima Divisione: 2012
- Lega Pro Prima Divisione: 2012
- Coppa Italia Lega Pro: 2012

Benevento

- Lega Pro: 2016 (Group C)

Lecce

- Serie B: 2022

Frosinone

- Serie B: 2023
