= Dorgu =

Dorgu is a surname of Nigerian origin. Notable people with the surname include:

- Ifenna Dorgu (born 2006), Danish footballer
- Karowei Dorgu (1958–2023), Nigerian bishop
- Patrick Dorgu (born 2004), Danish footballer
- Tebe Dorgu (born 1974), Nigerian wrestler
- Tupele Dorgu (born 1977), English actress
