= Chinazaekpere =

- Gender: Unisex
- Language: Igbo

Origin
- Meaning: 'God answers prayers'
- Region of origin: Nigeria

Chinazaekpere is an Igbo given name of Nigerian origin. It means 'God answers prayers.' The name is commonly given in appreciation for answered prayers and divine blessings.

== Person with the name ==
- Patrick Chinazaekpere Dorgu, Danish professional football player
