= 2024–25 Parma Calcio 1913 season =

Parma Calcio 1913
2024–25 season
- Owner: The Krause Group
- President: Kyle J. Krause
- Head Coach: Fabio Pecchia (until 17 February); Cristian Chivu (from 18 February)
- Stadium: Stadio Ennio Tardini
- Serie A: 16th
- Coppa Italia: First round
- Top goalscorer: League: Ange-Yoan Bonny (6); All: Ange-Yoan Bonny (6)
- Highest home attendance: 22,885 vs Lazio; 1 December 2024 (Serie A)
- Lowest home attendance: 15,865 vs Venezia; 19 January 2025 (Serie A)
- Average home league attendance: 18,629
- Biggest win: 3–1 vs Lazio (H); 1 December 2024 (Serie A); 2–0 vs Bologna (H); 22 February 2025 (Serie A)
- Biggest defeat: 0–5 vs Roma (A); 22 December 2024 (Serie A)
| Home colours | Away colours | Third colours |
- All statistics correct as of 17 May 2025.

The 2024–25 season was the 113th season in the history of Parma Calcio 1913. The club made its return to Serie A after three seasons' absence. In addition to the domestic league, the team participated in the Coppa Italia.

== Squad ==
As of 4 February 2025

Note: Flags indicate national team as defined under FIFA eligibility rules; some limited exceptions apply. Players may hold more than one non-FIFA nationality.

| No. | Pos. | Nation | Player |
|---|---|---|---|
| 3 | DF | VEN | Yordan Osorio |
| 4 | DF | HUN | Botond Balogh |
| 5 | DF | ARG | Lautaro Valenti |
| 7 | FW | POL | Adrian Benedyczak |
| 8 | MF | ARG | Nahuel Estévez |
| 9 | FW | CGO | Gabriel Charpentier |
| 10 | MF | ESP | Adrián Bernabé |
| 11 | FW | SWE | Pontus Almqvist |
| 13 | FW | FRA | Ange-Yoan Bonny |
| 14 | DF | ITA | Emanuele Valeri |
| 15 | DF | ITA | Enrico Delprato (captain) |
| 16 | MF | BEL | Mandela Keita |
| 17 | FW | SWE | Jacob Ondrejka |
| 18 | DF | NOR | Mathias Løvik |
| 19 | MF | SUI | Simon Sohm (vice-captain) |
| 20 | MF | FRA | Antoine Hainaut |

| No. | Pos. | Nation | Player |
|---|---|---|---|
| 21 | DF | ITA | Alessandro Vogliacco (on loan from Genoa) |
| 22 | FW | ITA | Matteo Cancellieri (on loan from Lazio) |
| 23 | MF | CIV | Drissa Camara |
| 27 | MF | BRA | Hernani |
| 28 | FW | ROU | Valentin Mihăilă |
| 30 | FW | BIH | Milan Đurić |
| 31 | GK | JPN | Zion Suzuki |
| 32 | FW | ARG | Mateo Pellegrino |
| 33 | GK | ITA | Richard Marcone |
| 39 | DF | AUS | Alessandro Circati |
| 40 | GK | ITA | Edoardo Corvi |
| 46 | DF | ITA | Giovanni Leoni |
| 61 | FW | TUN | Anas Haj Mohamed |
| 62 | FW | POL | Mateusz Kowalski |
| 98 | FW | ROU | Dennis Man |

== Transfers ==
=== Summer window ===
==== In ====
| Date | Pos. | Player | From | Fee | Notes | Ref. |
|---|---|---|---|---|---|---|
| 30 June 2024 | FW | (Italy) Daniele Iacoponi | (Italy) Rimini | End of loan | | |
| 1 July 2024 | DF | (Italy) Emanuele Valeri | (Italy) Frosinone | Free | End of contract | |
| 15 July 2024 | GK | (Japan) Zion Suzuki | (Belgium) Sint-Truiden | €7,500,000 | | |
| 13 August 2024 | FW | (Sweden) Pontus Almqvist | (Russia) Rostov | €500,000 | | |
| 27 August 2024 | DF | (Italy) Giovanni Leoni | (Italy) Sampdoria | €5,000,000 | | |
| 28 August 2024 | FW | (France) Antoine Joujou | (France) Le Havre | €3,000,000 | | |
| 29 August 2024 | MF | (Italy) Rachid Kouda | (Italy) Spezia | €4,500,000 | | |
| 30 August 2024 | MF | (Belgium) Mandela Keita | (Belgium) Antwerp | €11,800,000 | | |

==== Loans in ====
| Date | Pos. | Player | From | Fee | Notes | Ref. |
|---|---|---|---|---|---|---|
| 14 August 2024 | FW | (Italy) Matteo Cancellieri | (Italy) Lazio | €1,200,000 | Option to buy for €8,000,000 | |

==== Out ====
| Date | Pos. | Player | To | Fee | Notes | Ref. |
|---|---|---|---|---|---|---|
| 1 July 2024 | DF | (Argentina) Cristian Ansaldi | Retired | | | |
| 1 July 2024 | MF | (France) Nathan Buayi-Kiala | (France) Auxerre | Undisclosed | Loan transfer made permanent | |
| 1 July 2024 | MF | (Croatia) Stanko Jurić | (Spain) Real Valladolid | €1,500,000 | Loan transfer made permanent | |
| 1 July 2024 | FW | (Italy) Eric Lanini | (Italy) Benevento | Free | | |
| 1 July 2024 | FW | (Italy) Gennaro Tutino | (Italy) Cosenza | €2,500,000 | Loan transfer made permanent | |
| 1 July 2024 | DF | (Greece) Vasilios Zagaritis | (Netherlands) Almere City | Free | | |
| 5 July 2024 | FW | (Italy) Fabian Pavone | (Italy) Teramo | Free | | |
| 8 July 2024 | DF | (Italy) Antonello Vona | (Italy) Latina | Undisclosed | | |
| 16 July 2024 | GK | (Slovenia) Martin Turk | (Poland) Ruch Chorzów | €150,000 | | |
| 10 August 2024 | DF | (Italy) Giovanni Vaglica | (Italy) Pro Patria | Undisclosed | | |
| 18 August 2024 | MF | (Italy) Stefano Palmucci | (Italy) Fermana | Free | | |
| 30 August 2024 | FW | (Croatia) Antonio Čolak | (Italy) Spezia | €2,500,000 | | |
| 30 August 2024 | FW | (Italy) Roberto Inglese | (Italy) Catania | Free | | |
| 2 September 2024 | DF | (Belgium) Elias Cobbaut | (Czech Republic) Sparta Prague | Undisclosed | | |

==== Loans out ====
| Date | Pos. | Player | To | Fee | Notes | Ref. |
|---|---|---|---|---|---|---|
| 18 July 2024 | FW | (Latvia) Dario Šits | (Netherlands) Helmond Sport | Free | Option to buy for an undisclosed fee | |
| 2 August 2024 | FW | (Slovenia) Tjaš Begić | (Italy) Frosinone | Free | Option to buy for an undisclosed fee | |
| 10 August 2024 | DF | (Sweden) Peter Amoran | (Italy) Perugia | Free | | |
| 10 August 2024 | GK | (Italy) Filippo Rinaldi | (Italy) Feralpisalò | Free | | |
| 29 August 2024 | FW | (France) Antoine Joujou | (France) Le Havre | Free | | |
| 30 August 2024 | MF | (Italy) Rachid Kouda | (Italy) Spezia | Free | | |
| 30 August 2024 | FW | (Italy) Anthony Partipilo | (Italy) Frosinone | Free | Option to buy for €1,500,000 | |
| 6 September 2024 | FW | (Poland) Daniel Mikołajewski | (Poland) Zagłębie Lubin | Free | | |

=== Winter window ===
==== In ====
| Date | Pos. | Player | From | Fee | Notes | Ref. |
|---|---|---|---|---|---|---|
| 8 January 2025 | DF | (Norway) Mathias Løvik | (Norway) Molde | €6,000,000 | | |
| 10 January 2025 | GK | (Italy) Richard Marcone | (Italy) Turris | Undisclosed | | |
| 22 January 2025 | FW | (Bosnia and Herzegovina) Milan Đurić | (Italy) Monza | €1,500,000 | | |
| 23 January 2025 | FW | (Sweden) Jacob Ondrejka | (Belgium) Antwerp | €7,000,000 | | |
| 3 February 2025 | FW | (Argentina) Mateo Pellegrino | (Argentina) Vélez Sarsfield | €2,000,000 | | |

==== Loans in ====
| Date | Pos. | Player | From | Fee | Notes | Ref. |
|---|---|---|---|---|---|---|
| 15 January 2025 | DF | (Italy) Alessandro Vogliacco | (Italy) Genoa | Free | Option to buy for an undisclosed fee | |

==== Out ====
| Date | Pos. | Player | To | Fee | Notes | Ref. |
|---|---|---|---|---|---|---|
| 8 January 2025 | GK | (Argentina) Leandro Chichizola | (Italy) Spezia | Undisclosed | | |
| 15 January 2025 | DF | (France) Woyo Coulibaly | (England) Leicester City | €3,000,000 | | |
| 28 January 2025 | MF | (France) Wylan Cyprien | (China) Changchun Yatai | Undisclosed | | |
| 3 February 2025 | DF | (Italy) Gianluca Di Chiara | (Italy) Frosinone | Free | | |

==== Loans out ====
| Date | Pos. | Player | To | Fee | Notes | Ref. |

== Friendlies ==
=== Pre-season ===
| 13 July 2024 Friendly | Lugano (Switzerland) | 3–1 | (Italy) Parma | Lugano |
| 19:00 | Aliseda 2' (pen.); Cimignani 14'; Mahou 72' | | Partipilo 90+1' | Stadium: Cornaredo Stadium; Attendance: 2,748; Referee: Mirel Turkes (Switzerland) |

| 20 July 2024 Friendly | Antwerp (Belgium) | 1–2 | (Italy) Parma | Deurne, Belgium |
| 18:30 | Balikwisha 24' | | Partipilo 31'; Hernani 33' | Stadium: Bosuilstadion |

| 27 July 2024 Friendly | Galatasaray (Turkey) | 0–2 | (Italy) Parma | Austria |
| 19:30 | | | Hernani 42'; Man 70' |

== Competitions ==
=== Overall record ===
| Competition | First match | Last match | Starting round | Final position | Record | | | | | | | |
| Competition | First match | Last match | Starting round | Final position | Pld | W | D | L | GF | GA | GD | Win % |
|---|---|---|---|---|---|---|---|---|---|---|---|---|
| Serie A | 17 August 2024 | 24–25 May 2025 | Matchday 1 | 16 | 38 | 7 | 15 | 16 | 44 | 58 | −14 | 18.42 |
| Coppa Italia | 11 August 2024 | | First round | First round | 1 | 0 | 0 | 1 | 0 | 1 | −1 | 0.00 |
| Total | | | | | 39 | 7 | 15 | 17 | 44 | 59 | −15 | 17.95 |

Last updated: 25 May 2025
Source: Competitions

=== Serie A ===
==== League table ====
| Pos | Team | Pld | W | D | L | GF | GA | GD | Pts | Qualification or relegation |
|---|---|---|---|---|---|---|---|---|---|---|
| 14 | Hellas Verona | 38 | 10 | 7 | 21 | 34 | 66 | −32 | 37 | |
| 15 | Cagliari | 38 | 9 | 9 | 20 | 40 | 56 | −16 | 36 (Note: Cagliari finished ahead of Parma on head-to-head points: Parma 2–3 Cagliari, Cagliari 2–1 Parma.) | |
| 16 | Parma | 38 | 7 | 15 | 16 | 44 | 58 | −14 | 36 | |
| 17 | Lecce | 38 | 8 | 10 | 20 | 27 | 58 | −31 | 34 | |
| 18 | Empoli (R) | 38 | 6 | 13 | 19 | 33 | 59 | −26 | 31 | Relegation to Serie B |

Source: Serie A
Rules for classification: 1) Points; 2) Tiebreaker for Champions team and third relegated team; 3) Head-to-head points; 4) Head-to-head goal difference; 5) Goal difference; 6) Goals scored; 7) Draw.
(Note: Head-to-head record is used only after all the matches between the teams in question have been played)
(R) Relegated

==== Results summary ====
| Overall | | | | | | | | Home | | | | | | Away | | | | | |
| Pld | W | D | L | GF | GA | GD | Pts | W | D | L | GF | GA | GD | W | D | L | GF | GA | GD |
|---|---|---|---|---|---|---|---|---|---|---|---|---|---|---|---|---|---|---|---|
| 38 | 7 | 15 | 16 | 44 | 58 | −14 | 36 | 5 | 6 | 8 | 25 | 28 | −3 | 2 | 9 | 8 | 19 | 30 | −11 |

Last updated: 25 May 2025.
Source: Serie A

==== Results by round ====
| Round | 1 | 2 | 3 | 4 | 5 | 6 | 7 | 8 | 9 | 10 | 11 | 12 | 13 | 14 | 15 | 16 | 17 | 18 | 19 | 20 | 21 | 22 | 23 | 24 | 25 | 26 | 27 | 28 | 29 | 30 | 31 | 32 | 33 | 34 | 35 | 36 | 37 | 38 |
|---|---|---|---|---|---|---|---|---|---|---|---|---|---|---|---|---|---|---|---|---|---|---|---|---|---|---|---|---|---|---|---|---|---|---|---|---|---|---|
| Ground | H | H | A | H | A | H | A | A | H | A | H | A | H | H | A | H | A | H | A | A | H | A | H | A | H | H | A | H | A | A | H | A | H | A | H | A | H | A |
| Result | D | W | L | L | D | L | D | D | D | D | L | W | L | W | L | L | L | W | D | L | D | L | L | L | L | W | L | D | D | D | D | D | W | D | L | L | D | W |
| Position | 12 | 6 | 9 | 12 | 14 | 15 | 15 | 17 | 17 | 13 | 14 | 13 | 13 | 11 | 13 | 15 | 15 | 14 | 14 | 15 | 15 | 16 | 18 | 18 | 18 | 17 | 17 | 17 | 17 | 16 | 16 | 16 | 15 | 16 | 16 | 16 | 16 | 16 |

Updated to match(es) played on 25 May 2025. Source: Serie A
A = Away; H = Home; W = Win; D = Draw; L = Loss

==== Matches ====
The match schedule was released on 4 July 2024.

| 17 August 2024 1 | Parma | 1–1 | Fiorentina | Parma |
| 18:30 CEST (UTC+2) | Man 22'; Estévez (yellow card) 36'; Balogh (yellow card) 49'; Circati (yellow card) 85' | Report | Pongračić (yellow card) 35' (yellow-red card) 83'; Biraghi 75' | Stadium: Stadio Ennio Tardini; Attendance: 21,384; Referee: Giovanni Ayroldi |

| 24 August 2024 2 | Parma | 2–1 | Milan | Parma |
| 18:30 CEST (UTC+2) | Man 2'; Cancellieri 77' | Report | Pavlović (yellow card) 34'; Pulisic 66'; Emerson (yellow card) 88'; Loftus-Cheek (yellow card) 90+2' | Stadium: Stadio Ennio Tardini; Attendance: 21,808; Referee: Juan Luca Sacchi |

| 31 August 2024 3 | Napoli | 2–1 | Parma | Naples |
| 20:45 CEST (UTC+2) | Zambo Anguissa (yellow card) 43', (goal) 90+6'; Lobotka (yellow card) 58'; Lukaku 90+2' | Report | Bonny 19' (pen.); Mihăilă (yellow card) 61'; Suzuki (yellow card) 63' (yellow-red card) 75'; Del Prato (yellow card) 88' | Stadium: Stadio Diego Armando Maradona; Attendance: 51,520; Referee: Paride Tremolada |

| 16 September 2024 4 | Parma | 2–3 | Udinese | Parma |
| 18:30 CEST (UTC+2) | Del Prato 2'; Bonny 43'; Keita (yellow card) 62' (yellow-red card) 73' | Report | Gianetti (yellow card) 38'; Lucca 49'; Thauvin 68', 77'; Ehizibue (yellow card) 84'; Davis (yellow card) 87' | Stadium: Stadio Ennio Tardini; Referee: Rosario Abisso |

| 21 September 2024 5 | Lecce | 2–2 | Parma | Lecce |
| 20:45 CEST (UTC+2) | Ramadani (yellow card) 31'; Dorgu 32'; Guilbert (red card) 47'; Dorgu (yellow card) 51'; Gaspar (yellow card) 54'; Krstović 59'; Rafia (yellow card) 84' | Report | Cancellieri (red card) 58'; Almqvist 90+3'; Hainaut 90+5' | Stadium: Stadio Via del mare Referee: Marco Guida |

| 30 September 2024 6 | Parma | 2–3 | Cagliari | Parma |
| 20:45 CEST (UTC+2) | Bernabé (yellow card) 25'; Man 62'; Coulibaly (yellow card) 48'; Hernani 87'; Haj (yellow card) 90+1' | Report | Zortea 34'; Obert (yellow card) 53'; Marin 75'; Piccoli 87', (yellow card) 90' | Stadium: Stadio Ennio Tardini; Referee: Francesco Fourneau |

| 6 October 2024 7 | Bologna | 0–0 | Parma | Bologna |
| 15:00 CEST (UTC+2) | Urbański (yellow card) 84' | Report | Coulibaly (red card) 52' | Stadium: Stadio Renato Dall'Ara; Attendance: 28,461; Referee: Marco Di Bello |

| 19 October 2024 8 | Como | 1–1 | Parma | Como |
| 15:00 CEST (UTC+2) | Paz 45'; Roberto (yellow card) 59' | Report | Bonny 20'; Sohm (yellow card) 31'; Mihăilă (yellow card) 59' | Stadium: Stadio Giuseppe Sinigaglia; Referee: Michael Fabbri |

| 27 October 2024 9 | Parma | 1–1 | Empoli | Parma |
| 12:30 CEST (UTC+2) | Del Prato (yellow card) 16'; Hernani (yellow card) 50'; Charpentier 80'; Balogh (yellow card) 90+1'; Sohm (yellow card) 90+4' | Report | Anjorin (yellow card) 20'; Coulibaly 35' (o.g.); Ismajli (yellow card) 67'; Grassi (yellow card) 71'; Vásquez (yellow card) 82'; Pellegri (yellow card) 90+1' | Stadium: Stadio Ennio Tardini; Referee: Federico La Penna |

| 30 October 2024 10 | Juventus | 2–2 | Parma | Turin |
| 20:45 CET (UTC+1) | McKennie 31'; Vlahović (yellow card) 47'; Weah 49'; Conceição (yellow card) 58' | Report | Del Prato 3'; Sohm 38' | Stadium: Juventus Stadium; Attendance: 40,809; Referee: Luca Zufferli |

| 4 November 2024 11 | Parma | 0–1 | Genoa | Parma |
| 18:30 CET (UTC+1) | Keita (yellow card) 36'; Haj (yellow card) 41' | Report | Leali (yellow card) 27'; Zanoli (yellow card) 54'; Ekhator (yellow card) 60'; Pinamonti 79'; Vásquez (yellow card) 82'; Bani (yellow card) 90+2' | Stadium: Stadio Ennio Tardini; Referee: Marco Guida |

| 9 November 2024 12 | Venezia | 1–2 | Parma | Venice |
| 15:00 CET (UTC+1) | Nicolussi Caviglia 5'; Kofod (yellow card) 84' | Report | Valeri 17'; Cancellieri (yellow card) 50'; Bonny 68'; Charpentier (yellow card) 90' | Stadium: Stadio Pier Luigi Penzo; Referee: Daniele Chiffi |

| 23 November 2024 13 | Parma | 1–3 | Atalanta | Parma |
| 20:45 CET (UTC+1) | Cancellieri 49' | Report | Retegui 4'; Éderson 39'; Lookman 75'; Ruggeri (yellow card) 88'; De Roon (yellow card) 90+3' | Stadium: Stadio Ennio Tardini; Attendance: 18,790; Referee: Ginaluca Manganiello |

| 1 December 2024 14 | Parma | 3–1 | Lazio | Parma |
| 15:00 CET (UTC+1) | Man 6'; Keita (yellow card) 33'; Bonny (yellow card) 45+7'; Haj Mohamed 53'; Estévez (yellow card) 57'; Balogh (yellow card) 64'; Delprato 90+1' | Report | Rovella (yellow card) 30'; Gila (yellow card) 45+7'; Castellanos 80', (yellow card) 90' | Stadium: Stadio Ennio Tardini; Attendance: 22,885; Referee: Luca Zufferli |

| 6 December 2024 15 | Internazionale | 3–1 | Parma | Milan |
| 18:30 CET (UTC+1) | Dimarco 40', (yellow card) 64'; Barella 53'; Thuram 66' | Report | Keita (yellow card) 10'; Darmian 81' (o.g.) | Stadium: San Siro; Attendance: 71,879; Referee: Rosario Abisso |

| 15 December 2024 16 | Parma | 2–3 | Hellas Verona | Parma |
| 15:00 CET (UTC+1) | Sohm 19', 90'; Hernani (yellow card) 38' | Report | Coppola 5'; Coppola (yellow card) 40'; Faraoni (yellow card) 41'; Sarr 57'; Duda (yellow card) 63'; Mosquera 75' | Stadium: Stadio Ennio Tardini; Attendance: 17,003; Referee: Simone Sozza |

| 22 December 2024 17 | Roma | 5–0 | Parma | Rome |
| 12:30 CET (UTC+1) | Dybala 8' (pen.), 51'; Saelemaekers 13'; Angeliño (yellow card) 64'; Paredes 74' (pen.); Dovbyk 83' | Report | Bonny (yellow card) 23'; Almqvist (yellow card) 50' | Stadium: Stadio Olimpico; Attendance: 62,968; Referee: Marco Di Bello |

| 28 December 2024 18 | Parma | 2–1 | Monza | Parma |
| 15:00 CET (UTC+1) | Hernani 56' (pen.); Valenti (yellow card) 63', (goal) 90+8'; Hainaut (yellow card) 78'; Camara (yellow card) 90+5' | Report | Izzo (yellow card) 28'; D'Ambrosio (yellow card) 28'; Marí (yellow card) 34' (yellow-red card) 54'; Carboni (yellow card) 70'; Birindelli (yellow card) 74'; Pereira (yellow card) 90+6' | Stadium: Stadio Ennio Tardini; Referee: Federico La Penna |

| 5 January 2025 19 | Torino | 0–0 | Parma | Turin |
| 18:00 CET (UTC+1) | Ricci (yellow card) 8'; Linetty (yellow card) 80' | Report | Del Prato (yellow card) 14' | Stadium: Stadio Olimpico Grande Torino; Attendance: 19,744; Referee: Ermanno Feliciani |

| 12 January 2025 20 | Genoa | 1–0 | Parma | Genoa |
| 12:30 CET (UTC+1) | Badelj (yellow card) 4'; Lior Kasa (yellow card) 64'; Frendrup 65' | Report | Valenti (yellow card) 7'; Hernani (yellow card) 36'; Fabio Pecchia (yellow card) 38'; Del Prato (yellow card) 74' | Stadium: Estadio Luigi Ferraris; Attendance: 31,689; Referee: Andrea Colombo |

| 19 January 2025 21 | Parma | 1–1 | Venezia | Parma |
| 15:00 CET (UTC+1) | Keita (yellow card) 18'; Hernani 56' (pen.); Hainaut (yellow card) 87' | Report | Pohjanpalo 20' (pen.); Candela (yellow card) 32'; Bjarkason (yellow card) 74'; Carboni (yellow card) 90+3' | Stadium: Stadio Ennio Tardini; Attendance: 15,865; Referee: Francesco Fourneau |

| 26 January 2025 22 | Milan | 3–2 | Parma | Milan |
| 12:30 CET (UTC+1) | Pavlović (yellow card) 12'; Pulišić 38' (pen.); Fofana (yellow card) 43'; T. Reijnders 90+2'; Chukwueze 90+5' | Report | Cancellieri 24'; Vogliacco (yellow card) 33'; Sohm (yellow card) 37', (goal) 80'; Del Prato (yellow card) 45+1'; Mohamed Haj (yellow card) 74'; Hainaut (yellow card) 85' | Stadium: Estadio Giuseppe Meazza; Attendance: 72,304; Referee: Rosario Abisso |

| 31 January 2025 23 | Parma | 1–3 | Lecce | Parma |
| 20:45 CET (UTC+1) | Valeri 34' (pen.); Camara (yellow card) 90' | Report | Ylber (yellow card) 20'; Krstović 36'; Pierotti 63', 90+3'; Karlsson (yellow card) 79' | Stadium: Stadio Ennio Tardini; Attendance: 18,238; Referee: Simone Sozza |

| 9 February 2025 24 | Cagliari | 2–1 | Parma | Cagliari |
| 15:00 CET (UTC+1) | Vogliacco 57' (o.g.); Coman 70' | Report | Camara (yellow card) 55'; Leoni (yellow card) 78'; Hernani (yellow card) 90+1' | Stadium: Stadio Unipol Domus; Attendance: 16,154; Referee: Marco Di Bello |

| 16 February 2025 25 | Parma | 0–1 | Roma | Parma |
| 18:00 CET (UTC+1) | Leoni (red card) 31'; Balogh (yellow card) 82'; Almqvist (yellow card) 85' | Report | Soulé 33', (yellow card) 34'; Pellegrini (yellow card) 55'; Gourna-Douath (yellow card) 63' | Stadium: Stadio Ennio Tardini; Attendance: 20,559; Referee: Daniele Chiffi |

| 22 February 2025 26 | Parma | 2–0 | Bologna | Parma |
| 15:00 CET (UTC+1) | Bonny 37' (pen.); Almqvist (yellow card) 47'; Cancellieri (yellow card) 50'; Sohm 79' | Report | Calabria (yellow card) 68' | Stadium: Stadio Ennio Tardini; Attendance: 19,510; Referee: Rosario Abisso |

| 1 March 2015 27 | Udinese | 1–0 | Parma | Udine |
| 20:45 CEST (UTC+2) | Thauvin 38' (pen.); Modesto (yellow card) 90+4' | Report | Almqvist (yellow card) 90+5' | Stadium: Bluenergy Stadium; Attendance: 20,430; Referee: Fabio Maresca |

| 8 March 2025 28 | Parma | 2–2 | Torino | Parma |
| 15:00 CEST (UTC+2) | Vogliacco (yellow card) 13'; Valenti (yellow card) 35'; Sohm (yellow card) 57'; Pellegrino 60', 82', (yellow card) 71' | Report | Elmas 19'; Ricci (yellow card) 25'; Ché Adams 72', (yellow card) 73' | Stadium: Stadio Ennio Tardini; Attendance: 18,938; Referee: Francesco Fourneau |

| 15 March 2025 29 | Monza | 1–1 | Parma | Monza |
| 18:30 CEST (UTC+2) | Izzo 60' | Report | Leoni (yellow card) 52'; Haj Mohamed (yellow card) 72'; Bonny 84'; Hernani (yellow card) 87' | Stadium: Stadio Brianteo; Attendance: 9,251; Referee: Gianluca Manganiello |

| 31 March 2025 30 | Hellas Verona | 0–0 | Parma | Verona |
| 18:30 CEST (UTC+2) | Dawidowicz (yellow card) 65'; Bradarić (yellow card) 71' | Report | Delprato (yellow card) 71' | Stadium: Marcantonio Bentegodi; Referee: Juan Luca Sacchi |

| 5 April 2025 31 | Parma | 2–2 | Internazionale | Parma |
| 18:00 CET (UTC+1) | Almqvist (yellow card) 28'; Bernabé 60'; Ondrejka 69'; Del Prato (yellow card) 90+3' | Report | Darmian 15'; Thuram 45'; Dimarco (yellow card) 57'; Zalewski (yellow card) 89'; Correa (yellow card) 90+6' | Stadium: Stadio Ennio Tardini; Referee: Daniele Doveri |

| 13 April 2025 32 | Fiorentina | 0–0 | Parma | Florence |
| 16:00 CEST (UTC+2) | | Report | Pellegrino (yellow card) 12'; Valeri (yellow card) 35'; Leoni (yellow card) 41'; Sohm (yellow card) 43'; Valenti (yellow card) 88' | Stadium: Artemio Franchi; Attendance: 21,355; Referee: Gianluca Manganiello |

| 23 April 2025 33 | Parma | 1–0 | Juventus | Parma |
| 17:30 CET (UTC+1) | Sohm (yellow card) 25'; Pellegrino 45+1'; Hernani (yellow card) 49' | Report | González (yellow card) 53'; Locatelli (yellow card) 69'; Yıldız (yellow card) 76' | Stadium: Stadio Ennio Tardini; Referee: Daniele Chiffi |

| 28 April 2025 34 | Lazio | 2–2 | Parma | Rome |
| 19:45 CEST (UTC+2) | Castellanos (yellow card) 50'; Pedro 79', 84' | Report | Ondrejka 3', 46'; Leoni (yellow card) 54'; Hernani (yellow card) 75'; Đurić (yellow card) 80' | Stadium: Stadio Olimpico; Referee: Juan Luca Sacchi |

| 3 May 2025 35 | Parma | 0–1 | Como | Parma |
| 14:00 CET (UTC+1) | Hainaut (yellow card) 67' | Report | Kempf (yellow card) 12'; Strefezza 79' | Stadium: Stadio Ennio Tardini; Referee: Marco Di Bello |

| 10 May 2025 36 | Empoli | 2–1 | Parma | Empoli |
| 19:45 CEST (UTC+2) | Fazzini 11'; Cacace (yellow card) 73'; Anjorin 86'; Viti (yellow card) 88' | Report | Valenti (yellow card) 22' (yellow-red card) 31'; Đurić 73' | Stadium: Stadio Carlo Castellani; Referee: Michael Fabbri |

| 18 May 2025 37 | Parma | 0–0 | Napoli | Parma |
| 20:45 CEST (UTC+2) | Estévez (yellow card) 36'; Del Prato (yellow card) 70' | Report | Di Lorenzo (yellow card) 73'; Mazzocchi (yellow card) 90+4' | Stadium: Stadio Ennio Tardini; Referee: Daniele Doveri |

| 25 May 2025 38 | Atalanta | 2–3 | Parma | Bergamo |
| 15:00 CEST (UTC+2) | Maldini 32'; Maldini 33'; Djimsiti (yellow card) 47' | Report | Hainaut 49'; Ondrejka 71'; Balogh (yellow card) 89'; Ondrejka 90+1' | Stadium: Gewiss Stadium; Attendance: 23,161; Referee: Livio Marinelli |

=== Coppa Italia ===
| 11 August 2024 First round | Parma | 0–1 | Palermo | Parma |
| 18:30 | Dennis Man (penalty missed) 20'; Mihăilă (yellow card) 52' | | Blin (yellow card) 22'; Insigne 45+2'; Gomes (yellow card) 86'; Henry (yellow card) 88' | Stadium: Stadio Ennio Tardini; Attendance: 5.034; Referee: Daniele Perenzoni |
