= Juventud de Torremolinos CF =

Association football club in Spain

Juventud Torremolinos
- Full name: Juventud de Torremolinos Club de Fútbol
- Nicknames: Torroles; Los verdes
- Founded: 1958; 68 years ago
- Stadium: El Pozuelo
- Capacity: 3,000
- President: Rafael Cascallana Bermejo
- Head coach: Junes Barny (caretaker)
- League: Primera Federación – Group 2
- 2025–26: Primera Federación – Group 2, 15th of 20
- Website: jtorremolinoscf.com
Home colours	Away colours

Juventud de Torremolinos Club de Fútbol is a Spanish football team based in Torremolinos, Málaga, in the autonomous community of Andalusia. Founded in 1958, it plays in Primera Federación – Group 2, holding home matches at Estadio Municipal El Pozuelo.

== Season to season ==
Season	Tier	Division	Place	Copa del Rey
1962–63	4	1ª Reg.	4th	
1963–64	4	1ª Reg.		
1964–65	3	3ª	12th	
1965–66	3	3ª	12th	
1966–67	3	3ª	15th	
1967–68	3	3ª	13th	
1968–69	4	1ª Reg.	2nd	
1969–70	4	1ª Reg.	14th	
1970–71	4	1ª Reg.	11th	
1971–72	4	1ª Reg.	12th	
1972–73	4	1ª Reg.	18th	
1973–74	4	1ª Reg.	20th	
1974–75	5	1ª Reg.		
1975–76	6	2ª Reg.	5th	
1976–77	6	2ª Reg.	14th	
1977–78	6	1ª Reg.	6th	
1978–79	6	1ª Reg.	1st	
1979–80	5	Reg. Pref.	8th	
1980–81	4	3ª	5th	
1981–82	4	3ª	3rd	

Season	Tier	Division	Place	Copa del Rey
1982–83	4	3ª	8th	1st Round
1983–84	4	3ª	14th	2nd Round
1984–85	4	3ª	9th	
1985–86	4	3ª	10th	
1986–87	4	3ª	18th	
1987–88	4	3ª	10th	
1988–89	4	3ª	14th	
1989–90	4	3ª	18th	
1990–91	5	Reg. Pref.	1st	
1991–92	4	3ª	16th	
1992–93	4	3ª	16th	
1993–94	4	3ª	15th	
1994–95	4	3ª	7th	
1995–96	4	3ª	6th	
1996–97	4	3ª	6th	
1997–98	4	3ª	9th	
1998–99	4	3ª	12th	
1999–2000	4	3ª	13th	
2000–01	4	3ª	17th	
2001–02	4	3ª	19th	

Season	Tier	Division	Place	Copa del Rey
2002–03	5	Reg. Pref.	11th	
2003–04	5	Reg. Pref.	3rd	
2004–05	5	1ª And.	12th	
2005–06	5	1ª And.	10th	
2006–07	5	1ª And.	13th	
2007–08	5	1ª And.	3rd	
2008–09	5	1ª And.	9th	
2009–10	5	1ª And.	8th	
2010–11	5	1ª And.	16th	
2011–12	5	1ª And.	3rd	
2012–13	4	3ª	18th	
2013–14	5	1ª And.	2nd	
2014–15	5	1ª And.	4th	
2015–16	5	1ª And.	6th	
2016–17	5	Div. Hon.	1st	
2017–18	4	3ª	14th	
2018–19	4	3ª	16th	
2019–20	5	Div. Hon.	2nd	
2020–21	4	3ª	2nd	
2021–22	5	3ª RFEF	1st	

Season	Tier	Division	Place	Copa del Rey
2022–23	4	2ª Fed.	16th	Second round
2023–24	5	3ª Fed.	1st	
2024–25	4	2ª Fed.	1st	First round
2025–26	3	1ª Fed.	15th	First round
2026–27	3	1ª Fed.		

- 2 season in Primera Federación
- 2 seasons in Segunda Federación
- 29 seasons in Tercera División
- 2 seasons in Tercera Federación/Tercera División RFEF

== Current squad ==
As of 5 November 2026

Note: Flags indicate national team as defined under FIFA eligibility rules; some limited exceptions apply. Players may hold more than one non-FIFA nationality.

No.	Pos.	Nation	Player
1	GK	ESP	Javier Belman
2	DF	ESP	Rodrigo Ajegun
3	DF	PAN	Martín Krug (on loan from Levante)
4	DF	ESP	Mati Barboza
5	DF	ESP	Javi Mérida
6	MF	ESP	Ángel Climent
8	FW	ESP	Pau Pérez
9	FW	ESP	Dioni
10	MF	ESP	Cristian Rodríguez
11	FW	CRO	Ivan Laća
12	FW	DEN	Oscar Buch
13	GK	ESP	Javi Cuenca

No.	Pos.	Nation	Player
14	MF	CMR	Dominique Moubeke
15	DF	NGR	Daniel Igweike
16	DF	ESP	Manu Sánchez
17	FW	CMR	Nico Njalla
18	MF	CMR	Wilfrid Kaptoum
19	DF	ARG	Mateo Prevedini
20	FW	DEN	Ifenna Dorgu
21	DF	CIV	Mamadouba Diaby
22	MF	NED	Julian Brandes
23	DF	ESP	Max Petersson
24	DF	SWE	Emin Grozdanic

=== Reserve team ===
Note: Flags indicate national team as defined under FIFA eligibility rules; some limited exceptions apply. Players may hold more than one non-FIFA nationality.

No.	Pos.	Nation	Player
26	DF	ESP	Héctor Mezcua
27	FW	NGR	Ibra Matiti
28	MF	KOS	Driton Panxha
29	MF	ESP	Manu Sánchez

No.	Pos.	Nation	Player
31	MF	ESP	José Bozada
32	FW	ESP	Lucas Azaustre
33	GK	ESP	Yulen Vila

== Technical staff ==
Position	Name
Manager	(Spain) Antonio Calderón
Assistant coaches	(Spain) Salvador Marfil
Goalkeeping coach	(Spain) Ángel Aranda
Fitness coach	(Spain) Isidro Ruiz Fernández
Physiotherapist	(Spain) José Antonio Rodríguez Vega
Technical Director	(Spain) Juan Gambero
