= LACA =

LACA may refer to:

== Places ==
- Los Angeles, California, the second most populous city in the US
- Latin America and Central America, a designation used by American businesses doing business globally

== People ==
- Alexandre Lacazette (born 1991), nickname for the French footballer who plays for Arsenal.
- Ivan Laća (born 2003), Croatian professional footballer
- José María Laca (1898–1977), Spanish footballer

== Other uses ==
- lacA, a structural gene in the lac operon
