= 2023–24 US Lecce season =

US Lecce
2023–24 season
- President: Saverio Sticchi Damiani
- Head coach: Roberto D'Aversa (until 11 March); Luca Gotti (from 13 March)
- Stadium: Stadio Via del mare
- Serie A: 14th
- Coppa Italia: Round of 32
- Top goalscorer: League: Nikola Krstović (7); All: Nikola Krstović (7)
- Biggest win: Sassuolo 0–3 Lecce
- Biggest defeat: Lecce 0–4 Napoli; Bologna 4–0 Lecce; Lecce 0–4 Internazionale
Home colours	Away colours	Third colours

The 2023–24 season was Unione Sportiva Lecce's 115th season in existence and second consecutive season in Serie A. They also competed in the Coppa Italia.

== Players ==
=== First-team squad ===
As of 1 February 2024

Note: Flags indicate national team as defined under FIFA eligibility rules; some limited exceptions apply. Players may hold more than one non-FIFA nationality.

No.	Pos.	Nation	Player
5	DF	CRO	Marin Pongračić
6	DF	ITA	Federico Baschirotto (vice-captain)
7	FW	SWE	Pontus Almqvist (on loan from Rostov)
8	MF	TUN	Hamza Rafia
9	FW	MNE	Nikola Krstović
10	MF	FRA	Rémi Oudin
11	FW	ITA	Nicola Sansone
12	DF	ITA	Lorenzo Venuti
13	DF	DEN	Patrick Dorgu
16	MF	ESP	Joan González
17	DF	FRA	Valentin Gendrey
18	MF	ALB	Medon Berisha
20	MF	ALB	Ylber Ramadani (3rd captain)
21	GK	ITA	Federico Brancolini

No.	Pos.	Nation	Player
22	FW	ZAM	Lameck Banda
24	MF	DEN	Jeppe Corfitzen
25	DF	ITA	Antonino Gallo
29	MF	FRA	Alexis Blin (captain)
30	GK	ITA	Wladimiro Falcone
40	GK	FIN	Jasper Samooja
45	FW	ROU	Rareș Burnete
50	FW	ARG	Santiago Pierotti
55	DF	ALB	Kastriot Dermaku
59	DF	ALG	Ahmed Touba (on loan from İstanbul Başakşehir)
77	MF	FRA	Mohamed Kaba
83	MF	CZE	Daniel Samek
91	FW	ITA	Roberto Piccoli (on loan from Atalanta)
98	GK	ROU	Alexandru Borbei

=== Out on loan ===
As of 9 February 2024

Note: Flags indicate national team as defined under FIFA eligibility rules; some limited exceptions apply. Players may hold more than one non-FIFA nationality.

No.	Pos.	Nation	Player
—	GK	ITA	Marco Bleve (on loan to Carrarese until 30 June 2024)
—	DF	BEL	Mats Lemmens (on loan to Lecco until 30 June 2024)
—	DF	SWE	Zinedin Smajlović (on loan to Lecco until 30 June 2024)
—	MF	ITA	Giacomo Faticanti (on loan to Ternana until 30 June 2024)
—	MF	ISL	Þórir Helgason (on loan to Eintracht Braunschweig until 30 June 2024)
—	MF	MAR	Youssef Maleh (on loan to Empoli until 30 June 2024)

No.	Pos.	Nation	Player
—	MF	FIN	Henri Salomaa (on loan to Lecco until 30 June 2024)
—	FW	POL	Marcin Listkowski (on loan to Lecco until 30 June 2024)
—	FW	FIN	Eetu Mömmö (on loan to SJK until 31 December 2024)
—	FW	ESP	Pablo Rodríguez (on loan to Ascoli until 30 June 2024)
—	FW	BRA	Gabriel Strefezza (on loan to Como until 30 June 2024)
—	FW	SWE	Joel Voelkerling Persson (on loan to Vitesse until 30 June 2024)

== Transfers ==
=== In ===
Pos.	Player	Transferred from	Fee	Date	Source
MF	(Morocco) Youssef Maleh	(Italy) Fiorentina	€5,500,000	1 July 2023	
DF	(Croatia) Marin Pongračić	(Germany) VfL Wolfsburg	€2,000,000	1 July 2023	
MF	(Tunisia) Hamza Rafia	(Italy) Pescara	€800,000	18 July 2023	
GK	(Italy) Wladimiro Falcone	(Italy) Sampdoria	€4,000,000	27 July 2023	
MF	(France) Mohamed Kaba	(France) Valenciennes	€3,000,000	14 August 2023	
FW	(Montenegro) Nikola Krstović	(Slovakia) DAC Dunajská Streda	€4,000,000	18 August 2023	
MF	(Italy) Giacomo Faticanti	(Italy) Roma U19	Undisclosed	25 August 2023	
DF	(Algeria) Ahmed Touba	(Turkey) İstanbul Başakşehir	Loan	27 August 2023	
FW	(France) Rémi Oudin	(France) Bordeaux	€1,000,000	28 August 2023	
FW	(Italy) Nicola Sansone	Unattached	Free	11 September 2023	
FW	(Argentina) Santiago Pierotti	(Argentina) Colón	€1,200,000	16 January 2024	

=== Out ===
Pos.	Player	Transferred to	Fee	Date	Source
DF	(Italy) Fabio Lucioni	(Italy) Palermo	Undisclosed	1 July 2023	
DF	(Italy) Tommaso Cassandro	(Italy) Como	€500,000	13 July 2023	
DF	(Italy) Ilario Monterisi	(Italy) Frosinone	Undisclosed	14 July 2023	
DF	(Italy) Simone Romagnoli	(Italy) Frosinone	€100,000	25 July 2023	
MF	(Spain) Pablo Rodríguez	(Italy) Ascoli	Loan	10 August 2023	
DF	(Denmark) Morten Hjulmand	(Portugal) Sporting CP	€18,000,000	13 August 2023	
FW	(The Gambia) Assan Ceesay	(Saudi Arabia) Damac	€2,500,000	15 August 2023	
DF	(Belgium) Mats Lemmens	(Italy) Lecco	Loan	23 August 2023	
FW	(Sweden) Joel Voelkerling Persson	(Netherlands) Vitesse	Loan	29 August 2023	
FW	(Italy) Federico Di Francesco	(Italy) Palermo	Undisclosed	31 August 2023	
MF	(Morocco) Youssef Maleh	(Italy) Empoli	Loan	31 August 2023	
MF	(Italy) Giacomo Faticanti	(Italy) Ternana	Loan	8 January 2024	
DF	(Sweden) Zinedin Smajlović	(Italy) Lecco	Loan	18 January 2024	
FW	(Brazil) Gabriel Strefezza	(Italy) Como	Loan	29 January 2024	
FW	(Finland) Eetu Mömmö	(Finland) SJK	Loan	9 February 2024	

== Pre-season and friendlies ==
Win Draw Loss Fixtures

26 July 2023 Friendly	Lecce (Italy)	4–0	(Italy) Padova	Folgaria
17:00 CEST (UTC+2)	Rafia 3'; Banda 9'; Strefezza 17'; Corfitzen 84'	Report		Stadium: Centro Sportivo Folgaria; Referee: Marco Piccinni

30 July 2023 Friendly	Cittadella (Italy)	0–3	(Italy) Lecce	Lavarone
17:00 CEST (UTC+2)		Report	Strefezza 72'; Corfitzen 76'; Almqvist 81'	Stadium: Campo Calcio; Referee: Simone Di Renzo

6 August 2023 Ramón de Carranza Trophy	Cádiz (Spain)	1–1 (3–1 p)	(Italy) Lecce	Cádiz
21:00 CEST (UTC+2)	Alejo (yellow card) 35'; Roger 40'; Fali (yellow card) 78'	Report	Almqvist 13'; Strefezza (yellow card) 24'	Stadium: Nuevo Mirandilla; Attendance: 16,017; Referee: Francisco José Hernandez Maeso (Spain)
	Penalties
	Hernández (penalty missed); Negredo (penalty scored); Bastida (penalty scored); Lucas Pires (penalty scored)		(penalty missed) Strefezza; (penalty scored) Ceesay; (penalty missed) González; (penalty missed) Maleh

== Competitions ==
=== Overall record ===
Competition	First match	Last match	Starting round	Final position	Record							
Competition	First match	Last match	Starting round	Final position	Pld	W	D	L	GF	GA	GD	Win %
Serie A	20 August 2023	26 May 2024	Matchday 1	14th	38	8	14	16	32	54	−22	21.05
Coppa Italia	13 August 2023	1 November 2023	Round of 64	Round of 32	2	1	0	1	3	4	−1	50.00
Total					40	9	14	17	35	58	−23	22.50

Source: Soccerway

=== Serie A ===
==== League table ====
Pos	Team	Pld	W	D	L	GF	GA	GD	Pts
12	Monza	38	11	12	15	39	51	−12	45
13	Hellas Verona	38	9	11	18	38	51	−13	38 (Note: Hellas Verona finished ahead of Lecce on head-to-head points: Hellas Verona 2–2 Lecce, Lecce 0–1 Hellas Verona.)
14	Lecce	38	8	14	16	32	54	−22	38
15	Udinese	38	6	19	13	37	53	−16	37
16	Cagliari	38	8	12	18	42	68	−26	36 (Note: Cagliari finished ahead of Empoli on head-to-head points: Cagliari 0–0 Empoli, Empoli 0–1 Cagliari.)

Source: Serie A
Rules for classification: 1) Points; 2) Tiebreaker for Champions team and third relegated team; 3) Head-to-head points; 4) Head-to-head goal difference; 5) Goal difference; 6) Goals scored; 7) Draw.
(Note: Head-to-head record is used only after all the matches between the teams in question have been played)

==== Results summary ====
Overall								Home						Away					
Pld	W	D	L	GF	GA	GD	Pts	W	D	L	GF	GA	GD	W	D	L	GF	GA	GD
38	8	14	16	32	54	−22	38	6	6	7	17	27	−10	2	8	9	15	27	−12

Source: Serie A

==== Results by round ====
Round	1	2	3	4	5	6	7	8	9	10	11	12	13	14	15	16	17	18	19	20	21	22	23	24	25	26	27	28	29	30	31	32	33	34	35	36	37	38
Ground	H	A	H	A	H	A	H	H	A	H	A	H	A	H	A	H	A	A	H	A	H	A	H	A	A	H	A	H	A	H	A	H	A	H	A	H	H	A
Result	W	D	W	D	W	L	L	D	D	L	L	D	D	D	D	W	L	L	D	L	L	L	W	L	L	L	D	L	W	D	L	W	W	D	D	L	L	D
Position	7	7	4	4	3	6	7	9	10	11	13	14	13	13	13	12	12	13	13	13	14	14	13	13	13	14	13	16	13	13	14	13	13	13	13	13	14	14

Source: Serie A
A = Away; H = Home; W = Win; D = Draw; L = Loss

==== Matches ====
The league fixtures were unveiled on 5 July 2023.

20 August 2023 1	Lecce	2–1	Lazio	Lecce
20:45 CEST (UTC+2)	Strefezza (yellow card) 68'; González (yellow card) 80'; Pongračić (yellow card) 80'; Almqvist 85'; Di Francesco 87'	Report	Immobile 26'; Isaksen (yellow card) 71'; Pellegrini (yellow card) 90+4'	Stadium: Stadio Via del mare Attendance: 29,081; Referee: Federico Dionisi

27 August 2023 2	Fiorentina	2–2	Lecce	Florence
18:30 CEST (UTC+2)	González 3'; Duncan 25'; Martínez Quarta (yellow card) 59'	Report	Pongračić (yellow card) 15'; Rafia 49'; Gendrey (yellow card) 54'; Dorgu (yellow card) 63'; Krstović 76'	Stadium: Stadio Artemio Franchi; Attendance: 34,604; Referee: Maria Sole Ferrieri Caputi

3 September 2023 3	Lecce	2–0	Salernitana	Lecce
20:45 CEST (UTC+2)	Krstović 6'; Kaba (yellow card) 30'; Banda (yellow card) 42'; González (yellow card) 90+4'; Strefezza 90+8' (pen.)	Report	Lovato (yellow card) 17'; Łęgowski (yellow card) 76'; Bohinen (yellow card) 83'	Stadium: Stadio Via del mare Attendance: 28,052; Referee: Luca Massimi

17 September 2023 4	Monza	1–1	Lecce	Monza
15:00 CEST (UTC+2)	Caldirola (yellow card) 2' (yellow-red card) 85'; Marí (yellow card) 20'; Colpani 24'; Birindelli (yellow card) 61'; Ciurria (yellow card) 76'; Pereira (yellow card) 87'	Report	Krstović 3' (pen.); Rafia (yellow card) 45+2'; Baschirotto (red card) 55'	Stadium: Stadio Brianteo; Attendance: 13,074; Referee: Livio Marinelli

22 September 2023 5	Lecce	1–0	Genoa	Lecce
20:45 CEST (UTC+2)	Almqvist (yellow card) 59'; Oudin 83'	Report	De Winter (yellow card) 7'; Martín (yellow card) 9' (yellow-red card) 36'	Stadium: Stadio Via del mare Attendance: 27,053; Referee: Antonio Rapuano

26 September 2023 6	Juventus	1–0	Lecce	Turin
20:45 CEST (UTC+2)	Milik 57'; Chiesa (yellow card) 76'; Rabiot (yellow card) 90+1'	Report	Ramadani (yellow card) 30'; Rafia (yellow card) 69'; Kaba (yellow card) 85' (yellow-red card) 90+3'; Krstović (yellow card) 90'	Stadium: Juventus Stadium; Attendance: 38,445; Referee: Antonio Giua

30 September 2023 7	Lecce	0–4	Napoli	Lecce
15:00 CEST (UTC+2)	Gallo (yellow card) 36'; Ramadani (yellow card) 57'; González (yellow card) 81'	Report	Østigård 16'; Simeone (yellow card) 17'; Kvaratskhelia (yellow card) 33'; Osimhen 51'; Gaetano 88'; Politano 90+4' (pen.)	Stadium: Stadio Via del mare Attendance: 27,588; Referee: Luca Pairetto

6 October 2023 8	Lecce	1–1	Sassuolo	Lecce
20:45 CEST (UTC+2)	Rafia (yellow card) 44'; Krstović 48', (yellow card) 72'	Report	Boloca (yellow card) 1'; Berardi 22' (pen.); Pedersen (yellow card) 43'; Ferrari (yellow card) 80'	Stadium: Stadio Via del mare Attendance: 26,160; Referee: Juan Luca Sacchi

23 October 2023 9	Udinese	1–1	Lecce	Udinese
18:30 CEST (UTC+2)	Kabasele (yellow card) 5'; Thauvin 49' (pen.), (yellow card) 77'; Ebosele (yellow card) 90+1'	Report	Ramadani (yellow card) 34'; Pongračić (yellow card) 72'; Baschirotto (yellow card) 73'; Dorgu (yellow card) 75'; Piccoli 83'; Gendrey (yellow card) 84'	Stadium: Stadio Friuli; Attendance: 20,113; Referee: Paride Tremolada

28 October 2023 10	Lecce	0–1	Torino	Lecce
18:00 CEST (UTC+2)	Gendrey (yellow card) 35'; Rafia (yellow card) 41'; Gallo (yellow card) 78'	Report	Gineitis (yellow card) 11'; Linetty (yellow card) 26'; Lazaro (yellow card) 35'; Buongiorno 41'; Rodriguez (yellow card) 72'; Tameze (yellow card) 90+4'	Stadium: Stadio Via del mare Attendance: 26,123; Referee: Gianluca Aureliano

5 November 2023 11	Roma	2–1	Lecce	Rome
18:00 CET (UTC+1)	Lukaku (penalty missed) 5', 90+4', (yellow card) 90+6'; Sanches (yellow card) 76'; Llorente (yellow card) 89'; Azmoun 90+1'	Report	Banda (yellow card) 17'; Dorgu (yellow card) 27'; Almqvist 71'; Ramadani (yellow card) 77'; Touba (yellow card) 81'; Strefezza (yellow card) 87'	Stadium: Stadio Olimpico; Attendance: 64,790; Referee: Andrea Colombo

11 November 2023 12	Lecce	2–2	Milan	Lecce
15:00 CET (UTC+1)	Ramadani (yellow card) 45'; Strefezza (yellow card) 62'; Sansone 66'; Banda 70'; Piccoli (yellow card) 85'; González (yellow card) 90+2'	Report	Giroud 28', (yellow card) 90+3', (red card) 90+3'; Reijnders 35'; Hernandez (yellow card) 44'; Musah (yellow card) 80'; Calabria (yellow card) 81'; Florenzi (yellow card) 90'; Krunić (yellow card) 90+4'	Stadium: Stadio Via del mare Attendance: 26,484; Referee: Rosario Abisso

27 November 2023 13	Hellas Verona	2–2	Lecce	Verona
18:30 CET (UTC+1)	Duda (yellow card) 3'; Ngonge 41'; Đurić 77'	Report	Dorgu (yellow card) 5'; Banda (yellow card) 24'; Oudin 30'; González 69'	Stadium: Stadio Marcantonio Bentegodi; Attendance: 16,730; Referee: Federico La Penna

3 December 2023 14	Lecce	1–1	Bologna	Lecce
12:30 CET (UTC+1)	Ramadani (yellow card) 45'; Pongračić (yellow card) 84'; Sansone (yellow card) 90'; Piccoli 90+10' (pen.)	Report	Saelemaekers (yellow card) 52'; Lykogiannis 68'; Calafiori (yellow card) 90+10'	Stadium: Stadio Via del mare Attendance: 24,326; Referee: Daniele Doveri

11 December 2023 15	Empoli	1–1	Lecce	Empoli
18:30 CET (UTC+1)	Maleh (yellow card) 37'; Grassi (yellow card) 52'; Rafia 71' (o.g.)	Report	González (yellow card) 4'; Banda 64'; Ramadani (yellow card) 75'	Stadium: Stadio Carlo Castellani; Attendance: 7,152; Referee: Andrea Colombo

16 December 2023 16	Lecce	2–1	Frosinone	Lecce
15:00 CET (UTC+1)	Piccoli 11'; Blin (yellow card) 73'; Ramadani 89'	Report	Okoli (yellow card) 24'; Kaio 33' (pen.); Ibrahimović (yellow card) 38'; Barrenechea (yellow card) 43'; Romagnoli (yellow card) 90+6'	Stadium: Stadio Via del mare Attendance: 23,645; Referee: Luca Zufferli

23 December 2023 17	Internazionale	2–0	Lecce	Milan
18:00 CET (UTC+1)	Çalhanoğlu (yellow card) 30'; Bisseck 43'; Barella 78'	Report	González (yellow card) 15'; Piccoli (yellow card) 64'; Pongračić (yellow card) 74'; Banda (red card) 83'	Stadium: San Siro; Attendance: 72,723; Referee: Matteo Marcenaro

30 December 2023 18	Atalanta	1–0	Lecce	Bergamo
12:30 CET (UTC+1)	Zappacosta (yellow card) 35'; Lookman 58'; Holm (yellow card) 90+5'	Report	Ramadani (yellow card) 82'; Oudin (yellow card) 90+5'	Stadium: Gewiss Stadium; Attendance: 14,864; Referee: Gianluca Manganiello

6 January 2024 19	Lecce	1–1	Cagliari	Lecce
18:00 CET (UTC+1)	Gendrey 31'; Strefezza (yellow card) 67'	Report	Dossena (yellow card) 36'; Oristanio 68'	Stadium: Stadio Via del mare Attendance: 25,203; Referee: Davide Massa

14 January 2024 20	Lazio	1–0	Lecce	Rome
12:30 CET (UTC+1)	Zaccagni (yellow card) 45'; Felipe Anderson 58'; Guendouzi (yellow card) 77'; Vecino (yellow card) 89'; Immobile (yellow card) 90+3'	Report	Gendrey (yellow card) 45+1'; Venuti (yellow card) 75'; Ramadani (yellow card) 81'; Pongračić (yellow card) 90+4'	Stadium: Stadio Olimpico; Attendance: 40,000; Referee: Maria Sole Ferrieri Caputi

21 January 2024 21	Lecce	0–3	Juventus	Lecce
20:45 CET (UTC+1)	Kaba (yellow card) 89'	Report	McKennie (yellow card) 22'; Vlahović 59', 68'; Bremer 85'	Stadium: Stadio Via del mare Attendance: 28,074; Referee: Daniele Doveri

28 January 2024 22	Genoa	2–1	Lecce	Genoa
12:30 CET (UTC+1)	Retegui 70'; Ekuban 76'	Report	Krstović (penalty missed) 18', 31', (yellow card) 57'; Ramadani (yellow card) 90+5'	Stadium: Stadio Luigi Ferraris; Attendance: 32,152; Referee: Luca Pairetto

2 February 2024 23	Lecce	3–2	Fiorentina	Lecce
20:45 CET (UTC+1)	Oudin 17'; Almqvist (yellow card) 50'; Banda (yellow card) 77'; Gendrey (yellow card) 83'; Piccoli 90'; Dorgu 90+2'	Report	Martínez Quarta (yellow card) 15'; Mandragora 50'; Beltrán 67'; Ranieri (yellow card) 72'; González (yellow card) 90'	Stadium: Stadio Via del mare Attendance: 24,778; Referee: Antonio Giua

11 February 2024 24	Bologna	4–0	Lecce	Bologna
15:00 CET (UTC+1)	Beukema 5'; Orsolini 27', 49'; Calafiori (yellow card) 34'; Odgaard 82'	Report	Almqvist (yellow card) 41'; Oudin (yellow card) 75'	Stadium: Stadio Renato Dall'Ara; Attendance: 24,658; Referee: Gianluca Manganiello

16 February 2024 25	Torino	2–0	Lecce	Turin
19:00 CET (UTC+1)	Djidji (yellow card) 45'; Bellanova 50'; Zapata 81'	Report	Pongračić (yellow card) 41' (yellow-red card) 70'; Blin (yellow card) 50'; Dorgu (yellow card) 78'	Stadium: Stadio Olimpico Grande Torino; Attendance: 22,457; Referee: Giovanni Ayroldi

25 February 2024 26	Lecce	0–4	Internazionale	Lecce
18:00 CET (UTC+1)	Sansone (yellow card) 3'	Report	Martínez 15', 56'; Asllani (yellow card) 38'; Frattesi 54'; Mkhitaryan (yellow card) 63'; De Vrij 67'	Stadium: Stadio Via del mare Attendance: 27,910; Referee: Daniele Doveri

3 March 2024 27	Frosinone	1–1	Lecce	Frosinone
15:00 CET (UTC+1)	Reinier (yellow card) 44'; Cheddira 45+2'	Report	Almqvist (yellow card) 55'; Krstović (penalty missed) 61'; Cerofolini 61' (o.g.)	Stadium: Stadio Benito Stirpe; Attendance: 15,334; Referee: Marco Guida

10 March 2024 28	Lecce	0–1	Hellas Verona	Lecce
12:30 CET (UTC+1)	Banda (yellow card) 37'; Sansone (yellow card) 79'; Pongračić (yellow card) 90+2'	Report	Folorunsho 17'; Tchatchoua (yellow card) 43'; Silva (yellow card) 84'; Henry (yellow card) 90+2', (red card) 90+7'	Stadium: Stadio Via del mare Attendance: 25,222; Referee: Daniele Chiffi

16 March 2024 29	Salernitana	0–1	Lecce	Salerno
18:00 CET (UTC+1)	Coulibaly (yellow card) 30'; Maggiore (yellow card) 45'; Pirola (yellow card) 73'; Zanoli (yellow card) 82'	Report	Gyömbér 17' (o.g.); Ramadani (yellow card) 49'; Piccoli (yellow card) 54'; Pongračić (yellow card) 90+7'	Stadium: Stadio Arechi; Attendance: 15,376; Referee: Fabio Maresca

1 April 2024 30	Lecce	0–0	Roma	Lecce
18:00 CEST (UTC+2)	Piccoli (yellow card) 38'; Baschirotto (yellow card) 45'; Ramadani (yellow card) 81'	Report	Ndicka (yellow card) 12'; Cristante (yellow card) 85'	Stadium: Stadio Via del mare Attendance: 29,031; Referee: Matteo Marcenaro

6 April 2024 31	Milan	3–0	Lecce	Milan
15:00 CEST (UTC+2)	Pulisic 6'; Giroud 20'; Leão 57'; Chukwueze (yellow card) 78'	Report	Blin (yellow card) 34'; Krstović (red card) 45'	Stadium: San Siro; Attendance: 72,035; Referee: Luca Massimi

13 April 2024 32	Lecce	1–0	Empoli	Lecce
15:00 CEST (UTC+2)	Almqvist (yellow card) 45+3'; Sansone 89'	Report		Stadium: Stadio Via del mare Attendance: 25,957; Referee: Maurizio Mariani

21 April 2024 33	Sassuolo	0–3	Lecce	Reggio Emilia
12:30 CEST (UTC+2)	Laurienté (yellow card) 19'	Report	Gendrey 11'; Dorgu 15'; Piccoli 61'	Stadium: Mapei Stadium – Città del Tricolore; Attendance: 16,210; Referee: Daniele Doveri

27 April 2024 34	Lecce	1–1	Monza	Lecce
15:00 CEST (UTC+2)	Oudin (yellow card) 25'; Krstović (yellow card) 71', (goal) 90+2'	Report	Colombo (yellow card) 15'; Izzo (yellow card) 70'; Gagliardini (yellow card) 78'; Pessina 90+6' (pen.)	Stadium: Stadio Via del mare Attendance: 27,167; Referee: Alberto Santoro

5 May 2024 35	Cagliari	1–1	Lecce	Cagliari
12:30 CEST (UTC+2)	Mina 26'; Gaetano (red card) 42'; Scuffet (yellow card) 64'; Nández (yellow card) 74'; Augello (yellow card) 78'; Deiola (yellow card) 78'	Report	Piccoli (yellow card) 14'; Sansone (yellow card) 54'; Ramadani (yellow card) 56'; Baschirotto (yellow card) 74'; Krstović 84'	Stadium: Unipol Domus; Attendance: 16,407; Referee: Matteo Marcenaro

13 May 2024 36	Lecce	0–2	Udinese	Lecce
18:30 CEST (UTC+2)	Blin (yellow card) 17'; Dorgu (yellow card) 57'	Report	Lucca 36'; Payero (yellow card) 60'; Samardžić 85'	Stadium: Stadio Via del mare Attendance: 28,041; Referee: Davide Massa

18 May 2024 37	Lecce	0–2	Atalanta	Lecce
18:00 CEST (UTC+2)		Report	Hateboer (yellow card) 25'; Touré (yellow card) 37'; Pašalić (yellow card) 44'; De Ketelaere 48'; Scamacca 53'; Tolói (yellow card) 67'	Stadium: Stadio Via del mare Attendance: 26,354; Referee: Antonio Rapuano

26 May 2024 38	Napoli	0–0	Lecce	Naples
18:00 CEST (UTC+2)		Report		Stadium: Stadio Diego Armando Maradona; Attendance: 41,000; Referee: Federico Dionisi

=== Coppa Italia ===
13 August 2023 Round of 64	Lecce	1–0	Como	Lecce
21:00 CEST (UTC+2)	Baschirotto (yellow card) 2'; Almqvist 27'; Dorgu (yellow card) 86'	Report	Cassandro (yellow card) 19'; Abildgaard (yellow card) 23'	Stadium: Stadio Via del mare Attendance: 14,174; Referee: Daniele Rutella

1 November 2023 Round of 32	Lecce	2–4	Parma	Lecce
18:00 CET (UTC+1)	Piccoli 54'; Strefezza (yellow card) 72', (goal) 76'; Berisha (yellow card) 87'	Report	Sohm 9'; Bonny 26'; Mihăilă (yellow card) 33'; Coulibaly (yellow card) 74'; Zagaritis (yellow card) 85'; Pongračić 90+4' (o.g.); Man 90+7' (pen.)	Stadium: Stadio Via del mare Attendance: 6,654; Referee: Daniele Minelli
