= Giovanni Leoni =

Italian footballer (born 2006)

Personal information
- Full name: Giovanni Leoni
- Date of birth: 21 December 2006 (age 19)
- Place of birth: Rome, Italy
- Height: 1.96 m (6 ft 5 in)
- Position: Centre-back

Team information
- Current team: Liverpool
- Number: 15

Youth career
- Vigontina
- 2015–2019: Cittadella
- 2019–2023: Padova

Senior career*
Years	Team	Apps	(Gls)
2023–2024	Padova	1	(0)
2024	→ Sampdoria (loan)	12	(1)
2024	Sampdoria	0	(0)
2024–2025	Parma	17	(1)
2025–	Liverpool	0	(0)

International career^{‡}
2024–	Italy U18	1	(0)
2024–	Italy U19	7	(0)
- * Club domestic league appearances and goals as of 18 May 2025 (UTC) ‡ National team caps and goals as of 25 March 2025

Giovanni Leoni (Italian pronunciation: [dʒoˈvanni leˈoːni]; born 21 December 2006) is an Italian professional footballer who plays as a centre-back for Premier League club Liverpool.

== Club career ==
=== Early career ===
Leoni was born in Rome, in Italy and moved to Padua at the age of 5. He began playing football with Vigontina before moving to Cittadella, and finished his youth development at Padova. He made his senior and professional debut with Padova as a late substitute in a 3–2 Serie C win over AlbinoLeffe on 19 March 2023 at the age of 16 years and 3 months, making him the youngest professional footballer in Italy that season.

On 1 February 2024, he joined Sampdoria on loan until June 2026 with an option to buy for €1.5 million. On 25 June 2024, he signed a three-year contract with Sampdoria.

On 27 August 2024, Leoni moved to Parma in Serie A. On 9 February 2025, he scored his first goal for Parma, a powerful header against Cagliari in a 2–1 loss.

=== Liverpool ===
On 15 August 2025, Leoni completed a permanent transfer to Premier League club Liverpool for a reported fee of £26 million on a deal until June 2031. He made his debut for the club on 23 September, starting in a 2–1 win against Southampton in the EFL Cup third round. During this match, he suffered an anterior cruciate ligament injury, sidelining him for "about a year" as advised by Arne Slot, which would rule him out for the remainder of the season.

== International career ==
Leoni is a youth international for Italy, having been called up to the Italy U17s in March 2024. He received his first call-up to the senior side for their 2026 FIFA World Cup qualifying matches against Estonia and Israel on 29 August 2025.

== Style of play ==
A centre-back, Leoni can best play in the centre or right side of a three-man defense. He is also a modern defender who practices in the build up game, and in covering spaces tactically.

== Career statistics ==
=== Club ===
As of match played 23 September 2025

Appearances and goals by club, season and competition
Club	Season	League			National cup (Note: Includes Coppa Italia Serie C)		League cup (Note: Includes EFL Cup)		Europe		Other		Total	
Club	Season	Division	Apps	Goals	Apps	Goals	Apps	Goals	Apps	Goals	Apps	Goals	Apps	Goals
Padova	2022–23	Serie C	1	0	0	0	—		—		—		1	0
Padova	2023–24	Serie C	0	0	3	0	—		—		—		3	0
Padova	Total		1	0	3	0	—		—		—		4	0
Sampdoria (loan)	2023–24	Serie B	12	1	—		—		—		0	0	12	1
Parma	2024–25	Serie A	17	1	—		—		—		—		17	1
Liverpool	2025–26	Premier League	0	0	0	0	1	0	0	0	—		1	0
Liverpool	2026–27	Premier League	0	0	0	0	0	0	0	0	—		0	0
Liverpool	Total		0	0	0	0	1	0	0	0	—		1	0
Career total			30	2	3	0	1	0	0	0	0	0	34	2
