= Dioni =

Spanish footballer

Personal information
- Full name: Dionisio Emanuel Villalba Rojano
- Date of birth: 21 December 1989 (age 36)
- Place of birth: Málaga, Spain
- Height: 1.84 m (6 ft 1/2 in)
- Position: Striker

Team information
- Current team: Juventud Torremolinos

Youth career
- Málaga
- 2007–2008: Murcia

Senior career*
Years	Team	Apps	(Gls)
2008–2009	Murcia Deportivo	30	(12)
2009–2010	Caravaca	34	(11)
2010–2011	Deportivo B	31	(13)
2010–2011	Deportivo La Coruña	4	(0)
2011–2012	Cádiz	29	(5)
2012–2014	Udinese	0	(0)
2012–2013	→ Leganés (loan)	35	(21)
2013–2014	→ Hércules (loan)	11	(1)
2014	→ Cádiz (loan)	14	(1)
2014–2016	Granada	0	(0)
2014–2015	→ Leganés (loan)	6	(0)
2015	→ Oviedo (loan)	12	(4)
2015–2016	→ Racing Santander (loan)	35	(13)
2016–2018	Fuenlabrada	72	(45)
2018–2019	Lech Poznań	7	(0)
2018	Lech Poznań II	2	(0)
2019–2021	Cultural Leonesa	64	(25)
2021–2023	Atlético Baleares	69	(31)
2023–2025	Málaga	75	(15)
2025–2026	Eldense	34	(11)
2026–	Juventud Torremolinos	0	(0)
- * Club domestic league appearances and goals as of 16:43, 3 June 2026 (UTC)

Dionisio Emanuel Villalba Rojano (born 21 December 1989), known as Dioni, is a Spanish professional footballer who plays as a striker for Primera Federación club Juventud de Torremolinos.

== Club career ==
Born in Málaga, Andalusia, Dioni joined Deportivo de La Coruña in 2010 at the age of 20, being assigned to the reserves initially. He only made five competitive appearances with the first team during his tenure, his La Liga debut coming on 23 September 2010 when he came on as a second-half substitute for Adrián López in a 1–0 away loss against Villarreal CF.

In summer 2012, Dioni signed with Udinese Calcio, being consecutively loaned to CD Leganés (Segunda División B), Hércules CF (Segunda División, where he scored his first goal as a professional in a 2–2 home draw with RCD Mallorca on 15 September 2013) and Cádiz CF (third level) and failing to play any official matches with the Italians. He met the same fate at his next club Granada CF, having temporary spells at Leganés, Real Oviedo and Racing de Santander – all sides competed in division three.

Dioni moved to CF Fuenlabrada on a three-year contract on 6 July 2016, netting 24 times in his first season in an eventual elimination in the third tier promotion play-offs. On 10 December 2017, early into the following campaign, he scored five goals in the 7–0 home rout of Coruxo FC.

On 1 August 2018, the 28-year-old Dioni moved abroad for the first time in his career, signing a two-year deal with Polish club Lech Poznań. The following transfer window, however, he returned to his homeland and agreed to a two-and-a-half-year contract at third-division Cultural y Deportiva Leonesa.

Dioni continued to compete in the third tier the following years, representing CD Atlético Baleares, Málaga CF, CD Eldense and Juventud de Torremolinos CF. The veteran played a key role as the second and third clubs achieved promotion.

== Career statistics ==
As of match played 2 May 2021

Appearances and goals by club, season and competition
Club	Season	League			National cup (Note: Includes Copa del Rey, Polish Cup)		Continental		Other		Total	
Club	Season	Division	Apps	Goals	Apps	Goals	Apps	Goals	Apps	Goals	Apps	Goals
Murcia Deportivo	2008–09	Tercera División	30	12	—		—		—		30	12
Caravaca	2009–10	Segunda División B	34	11	1	0	—		—		5	0
Deportivo B	2010–11	Segunda División B	31	13	—		—		—		31	13
Deportivo La Coruña	2011–12	La Liga	4	0	1	0	—		—		5	0
Cádiz	2011–12	Segunda División B	29	5	2	1	—		4 (Note: Appearances in Segunda División B play-offs)	1	35	7
Leganés (loan)	2012–13	Segunda División B	35	21	0	0	—		2	0	37	21
Hércules (loan)	2013–14	Segunda División	11	1	2	0	—		—		13	1
Cádiz (loan)	2013–14	Segunda División B	14	1	0	0	—		2	0	16	1
Leganés (loan)	2014–15	Segunda División	6	0	0	0	—		—		6	0
Oviedo (loan)	2014–15	Segunda División B	12	4	0	0	—		3	0	15	4
Racing Santander (loan)	2015–16	Segunda División B	35	13	1	0	—		4	0	40	13
Fuenlabrada	2016–17	Segunda División B	35	24	0	0	—		2	0	37	24
Fuenlabrada	2017–18	Segunda División B	37	21	4	2	—		4	0	45	23
Fuenlabrada	Total		72	45	4	2	—		6	0	82	47
Lech Poznań	2018–19	Ekstraklasa	7	0	1	0	0	0	—		8	0
Lech Poznań II	2018–19	III liga, gr. II	2	0	—		—		—		2	0
Cultural Leonesa	2018–19	Segunda División B	15	5	0	0	—		—		15	5
Cultural Leonesa	2019–20	Segunda División B	26	11	2	0	—		2	2	30	11
Cultural Leonesa	2020–21	Segunda División B	23	9	2	1	—		—		25	10
Cultural Leonesa	Total		64	25	4	1	—		2	2	70	26
Total			386	151	16	4	0	0	23	3	425	158
