= Dominique Moubeke =

Cameroonian footballer

Personal information
- Full name: Dominique A. Moubeke
- Date of birth: 11 August 2005 (age 21)
- Place of birth: Cameroon
- Height: 1.81 m (5 ft 11 in)
- Position: Midfielder

Team information
- Current team: Juventud Torremolinos

Youth career
- JSA New Town
- Moralo

Senior career*
Years	Team	Apps	(Gls)
2023–2025	Moralo B	7	(0)
2024–2025	→ Coria (loan)	19	(1)
2025–2026	Granada B	19	(3)
2025	Granada	1	(0)
2026–	Juventud Torremolinos	0	(0)
- * Club domestic league appearances and goals as of 9 June 2026

Dominique A. Moubeke (born 11 August 2005) is a Cameroonian footballer who plays as a midfielder for Spanish club Juventud de Torremolinos CF.

== Career ==
Moubeke finished his formation with Moralo CP, and made his senior debut with the reserves in the Primera División Extremeña, in the 2023–24 season. On 31 August 2024, he was loaned to Segunda Federación side CD Coria, for one year.

On 19 July 2025, Moubeke joined Granada CF and was initially assigned to the reserves in Tercera Federación. He started to feature with the main squad in the pre-season shortly after, and made his professional debut on 22 August, coming on as a second-half substitute for José Arnaiz in a 3–0 Segunda División away loss to SD Eibar.

On 3 July 2026, Moubeke was announced at Primera Federación side Juventud de Torremolinos CF.
