= Rémi Oudin =

French footballer (born 1996)

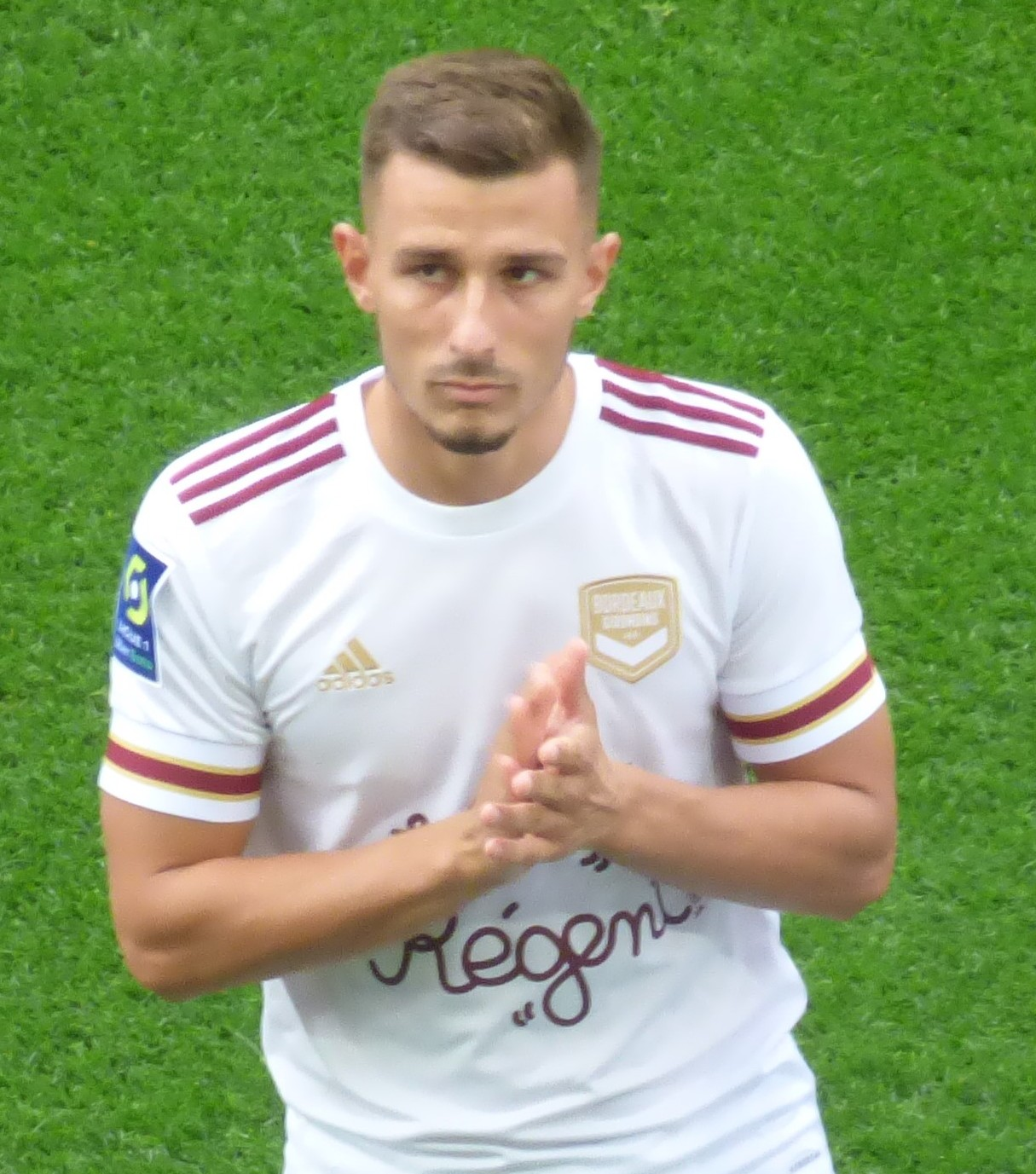
- Oudin with Bordeauxin 2020

Personal information
- Date of birth: 18 November 1996 (age 29)
- Place of birth: Châlons-en-Champagne, France
- Height: 1.85 m (6 ft 1 in)
- Positions: Midfielder; winger; forward

Team information
- Current team: AEL Limassol
- Number: 10

Youth career
- 2006–2008: Sarreguemines
- 2008–2011: Metz
- 2011–2015: Reims

Senior career*
| Years | Team | Apps | (Gls) |
| 2015–2017 | Reims B | 37 | (30) |
| 2016–2020 | Reims | 103 | (24) |
| 2020–2023 | Bordeaux | 79 | (9) |
| 2022–2023 | → Lecce (loan) | 31 | (3) |
| 2023–2025 | Lecce | 42 | (3) |
| 2025 | → Sampdoria (loan) | 13 | (1) |
| 2025–2026 | Catanzaro | 11 | (0) |
| 2026– | AEL Limassol | 9 | (1) |
- * Club domestic league appearances and goals as of 7 November 2026

Rémi Oudin (born 18 November 1996) is a French professional footballer who plays as a midfielder for Cypriot First Division club AEL Limassol.

A versatile player, Oudin can play as a winger, left midfielder, central midfielder or forward.

== Career ==
Oudin is a youth exponent from Reims. He made his Ligue 2 debut on 13 August 2016 against Valenciennes replacing Pablo Chavarría after 67 minutes in a 0–0 away draw.

Oudin helped Reims win the 2017–18 Ligue 2, helping promote them to the Ligue 1 for the 2018–19 season.

On 31 August 2022, Oudin joined Lecce in Italy on loan. On 28 August 2023, he joined Lecce on a permanent basis.

On 24 January 2025, Oudin moved on loan to Sampdoria in Serie B, with an option to buy. He signed a contract with Sampdoria until 2027 that would have been in place if the option was exercised.

On 1 September 2025, Oudin signed a one-season deal with Catanzaro in Serie B.

On 3 August 2026, Oudin signed a two-year contract with Cypriot First Division club, AEL Limassol.

== Career statistics ==
As of match played 6 April 2025

Appearances and goals by club, season and competition
| Club | Season | League | | | National cup | | League cup | | Other | | Total | |
| Club | Season | Division | Apps | Goals | Apps | Goals | Apps | Goals | Apps | Goals | Apps | Goals |
|---|---|---|---|---|---|---|---|---|---|---|---|---|
| Reims B | 2015–16 | CFA 2 | 24 | 19 | — | | — | | — | | 24 | 19 |
| Reims B | 2016–17 | CFA 2 | 9 | 7 | — | | — | | — | | 9 | 7 |
| Reims B | 2017–18 | National 2 | 4 | 4 | — | | — | | — | | 4 | 4 |
| Reims B | Total | | 37 | 30 | — | | — | | — | | 37 | 30 |
| Reims | 2016–17 | Ligue 2 | 24 | 4 | 2 | 1 | 1 | 0 | — | | 27 | 5 |
| Reims | 2017–18 | Ligue 2 | 24 | 7 | 2 | 1 | 1 | 0 | — | | 27 | 8 |
| Reims | 2018–19 | Ligue 1 | 37 | 10 | 2 | 2 | 1 | 0 | — | | 40 | 12 |
| Reims | 2019–20 | Ligue 1 | 18 | 3 | 1 | 0 | 2 | 0 | — | | 21 | 3 |
| Reims | Total | | 103 | 24 | 7 | 4 | 5 | 0 | — | | 115 | 28 |
| Bordeaux | 2019–20 | Ligue 1 | 8 | 1 | 1 | 0 | — | | — | | 9 | 1 |
| Bordeaux | 2020–21 | Ligue 1 | 38 | 4 | 1 | 0 | — | | — | | 39 | 4 |
| Bordeaux | 2021–22 | Ligue 1 | 33 | 4 | 0 | 0 | — | | — | | 33 | 4 |
| Bordeaux | Total | | 79 | 9 | 2 | 0 | 0 | 0 | — | | 81 | 9 |
| Lecce (loan) | 2022–23 | Serie A | 31 | 3 | — | | — | | — | | 31 | 3 |
| Lecce | 2023–24 | Serie A | 31 | 3 | 1 | 0 | — | | — | | 32 | 3 |
| Lecce | 2024–25 | Serie A | 11 | 0 | 2 | 0 | — | | — | | 13 | 0 |
| Lecce | Total | | 73 | 6 | 3 | 0 | — | | — | | 49 | 6 |
| Sampdoria (loan) | 2024–25 | Serie B | 10 | 1 | — | | — | | — | | 10 | 1 |
| Career total | | | 302 | 70 | 12 | 4 | 5 | 0 | 0 | 0 | 319 | 74 |

== Honours ==
Reims B

- CFA 2 — Group F: 2015–16

Reims

- Ligue 2: 2017–18
