= Pontus Almqvist =

Swedish footballer

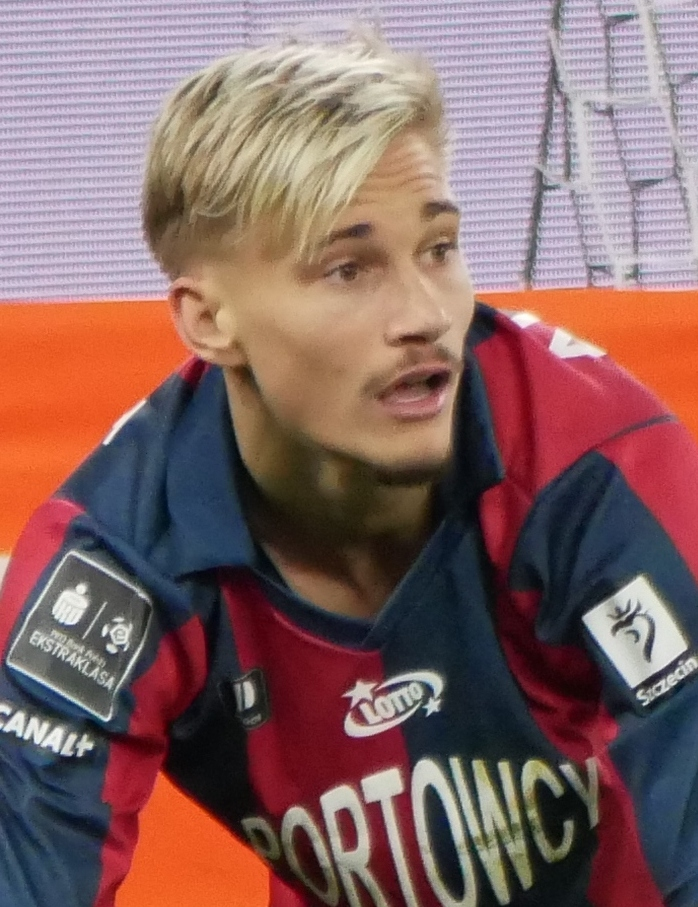
- Almqvist with Pogoń Szczecin in 2023

Personal information
- Full name: Pontus Skule Erik Almqvist
- Date of birth: 10 July 1999 (age 27)
- Place of birth: Nyköping, Sweden
- Height: 1.83 m (6 ft 0 in)
- Position: Winger

Team information
- Current team: Parma
- Number: 11

Youth career
- –2013: Nyköping
- 2014: Syrianska
- 2014: Norrköping
- 2015–2016: Nike Academy
- 2016: IFK Norrköping

Senior career*
Years	Team	Apps	(Gls)
2017–2020	Norrköping	28	(5)
2017	→ Sylvia (loan)	3	(1)
2018	→ Varbergs BoIS (loan)	4	(0)
2018	→ Norrby (loan)	14	(1)
2019	→ Sylvia (loan)	6	(2)
2020–2024	Rostov	37	(3)
2022	→ Utrecht (loan)	9	(0)
2022–2023	→ Pogoń Szczecin (loan)	27	(5)
2023–2024	→ Lecce (loan)	30	(2)
2024–	Parma	45	(2)

International career
2017–2019	Sweden U19	2	(0)
2020	Sweden U21	5	(2)
- * Club domestic league appearances and goals as of 15:16, 20 September 2026 (UTC)

Pontus Skule Erik Almqvist (born 10 July 1999) is a Swedish professional footballer who plays for Serie A club Parma. He is deployed as a winger or forward.

== Club career ==
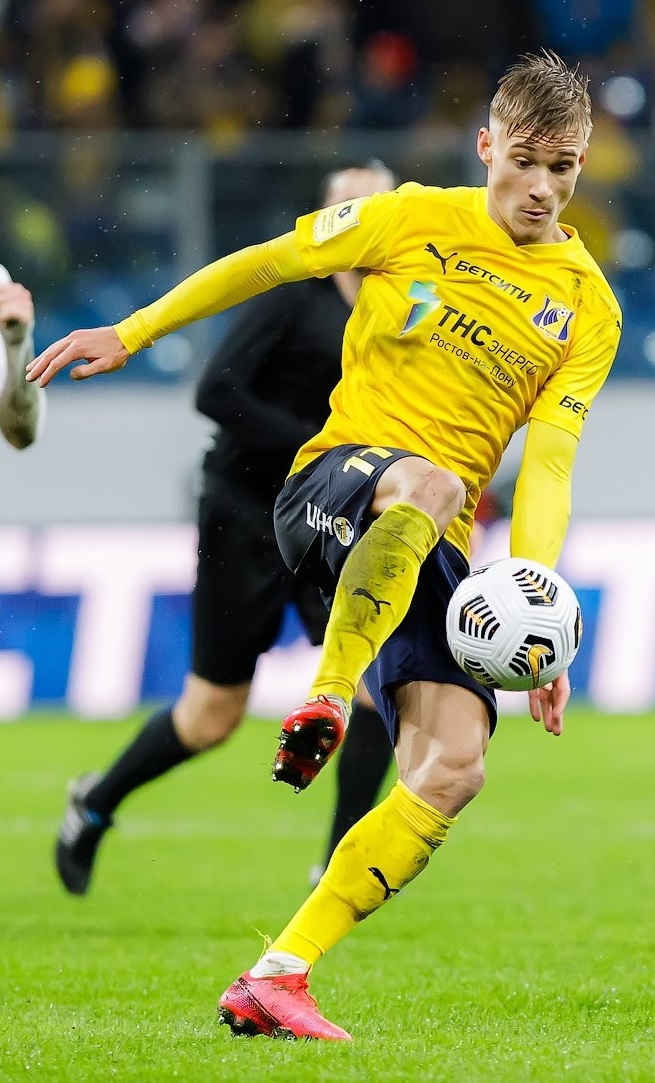
Almqvist in 2021 with Rostov

After attending trials in Stockholm, Almqvist joined the Nike Football Academy before signing a professional contract with Norrköping for the 2017 season. On 23 September 2017, he made his debut for Norrköping, playing the last ten minutes in a 2–1 loss to Halmstad. He spent part of the 2017 season loan at Division 2 side IF Sylvia where he played three games and scored one goal. He joined Varbergs BoIS on loan at the start of the 2018 season and played four times before returning to Norrköping in July 2018. He scored his first two goals for Sweden U21 in September 2020

On 15 October 2020, Almqvist signed a five-year contract with Russian Premier League club Rostov. On 7 March 2022, FIFA introduced special regulations related to the Russian invasion of Ukraine. Those regulations allow foreign players in Russia to unilaterally temporarily suspend their contracts with their Russian clubs until the end of the 2021–22 season and join clubs outside of Russia until that date. On 17 March 2022, Almqvist used the new rule to sign with FC Utrecht in the Netherlands until the end of the 2021–22 season.

FIFA extended their regulations for the 2022–23 season, allowing Almqvist to join Polish side Pogoń Szczecin on a one-year loan spell on 5 July 2022.

On 22 June 2023, Almqvist moved on a new temporary deal to Lecce in Italy.

On 13 August 2024, Almqvist signed with Parma in Italy on a permanent basis.

== Personal life ==
Pontus Almqvist is the brother of Swedish footballer Tove Almqvist.

== Career statistics ==
As of match played 20 September 2026

Appearances and goals by club, season and competition
Club	Season	League			National cup (Note: Includes Svenska Cupen, Russian Cup)		Europe		Total	
Club	Season	Division	Apps	Goals	Apps	Goals	Apps	Goals	Apps	Goals
Norrköping	2017	Allsvenskan	1	0	1	0	0	0	2	0
Norrköping	2019	Allsvenskan	7	0	2	0	–		9	0
Norrköping	2020	Allsvenskan	20	5	0	0	–		20	5
Norrköping	Total		28	5	3	0	0	0	31	5
Sylvia (loan)	2017	Division 2	3	1	–		–		3	1
Varberg (loan)	2018	Superettan	4	0	–		–		4	0
Norrby (loan)	2018	Superettan	14	1	1	0	–		15	1
Sylvia (loan)	2019	Ettan	6	2	–		–		6	2
Rostov	2020–21	Russian Premier League	19	1	1	0	–		20	1
Rostov	2021–22	Russian Premier League	18	2	1	0	–		19	2
Rostov	Total		37	3	2	0	0	0	39	3
Utrecht (loan)	2021–22	Eredivisie	9	0	–		–		9	0
Pogoń Szczecin (loan)	2022–23	Ekstraklasa	27	5	0	0	3	0	30	5
Lecce	2023–24	Serie A	30	2	2	1	–		32	3
Parma	2024–25	Serie A	29	1	0	0	–		29	1
Parma	2025–26	Serie A	13	0	1	0	–		14	0
Parma	2026–27	Serie A	5	1	1	0	–		6	1
Parma	Total		45	2	4	0	0	0	49	2
Career total			205	21	10	1	3	0	218	22
