= Emin Grozdanic =

Swedish footballer

Personal information
- Date of birth: 5 July 1999 (age 27)
- Place of birth: Gothenburg, Sweden
- Height: 1.84 m (6 ft 0 in)
- Position: Centre-back

Team information
- Current team: Juventud de Torremolinos

Youth career
- –2013: IFK Göteborg
- 2014–2017: GAIS

Senior career*
Years	Team	Apps	(Gls)
2018	GAIS	9	(0)
2019	Syrianska	14	(0)
2020–2022	GAIS	75	(2)
2023–2025	IFK Värnamo	72	(1)
2026–	Juventud de Torremolinos		
- * Club domestic league appearances and goals as of 2 April 2026

Emin Grozdanic (born 5 July 1999) is a Swedish footballer who plays as a centre-back for Juventud de Torremolinos CF.

== Career ==
Grozdanic began his youth career in Gothenburg with IFK Göteborg, but had moved to GAIS by his last year as an U19 player. He also made his senior debut, but ahead of the 2019 season he left GAIS together with Ajdin Zeljkovic, a player he would later team up with later. After one season in Syrianska FC, Grozdanic returned to GAIS and became one of their most reliable players and team captain. In 2021 he was called "born-again" by Göteborgs-Posten. Although the club was relegated from the 2021 Superettan, Grozdanic was a key player in winning re-promotion from the 2022 Ettan. He was named in the Team of the Season for the first half of 2022 by Expressen.

Consequently, he was signed on a three-year contract by IFK Värnamo on the first tier. Here he reunited with Ajdin Zeljkovic, and Grozdanic quickly became a key player there as well. His Allsvenskan debut on 2 April 2023 against his former youth club IFK Göteborg even ended in a 1–0 away victory. Grozdanic started 29 of 30 league games, only being substituted once.

On 1 January 2026, his contract with the club expired, and thus he became a free agent. Following almost eight months without a team, he signed for Spanish club Juventud de Torremolinos CF.
