= Mamadouba Diaby =

Guinean footballer (born 1997)

Personal information
- Date of birth: 16 February 1997 (age 29)
- Place of birth: Séguéla, Ivory Coast
- Height: 1.75 m (5 ft 9 in)
- Position: Left-back

Team information
- Current team: Juventud de Torremolinos

Youth career
- –2017: AS Kaloum Star

Senior career*
Years	Team	Apps	(Gls)
2017	Eskilstuna City FK	4	(0)
2018	AFC Eskilstuna	1	(0)
2019	Assyriska FF	22	(3)
2020	IFK Haninge	17	(0)
2021	Assyriska FF	27	(1)
2021	Hammarby TFF	26	(1)
2023	Nordic United FC	26	(3)
2024–2026	Degerfors IF	49	(1)
2026–	Juventud de Torremolinos		

International career
- Guinea U17
- * Club domestic league appearances and goals as of 24 August 2026

Mamadouba Diaby (born 16 February 1997) is a footballer who plays as a left-back for Juventud de Torremolinos CF in Spain. Born in the Ivory Coast, he represents Guinea internationally.

== Career ==
Diaby was a squad member for the Guinea national under-17 football team for both the 2017 U-20 Africa Cup of Nations and the 2017 FIFA U-20 World Cup. After the World Cup he moved to Europe, going on trial with AFC Eskilstuna and signing for Eskilstuna City FK, reportedly as part of "a project" together with AFC. He continued on to AFC the next year, and did make his Superettan debut, but barely played. Following a trial with Linköping City in early 2019, he had two spells in Assyriska FF and one each in IFK Haninge and Hammarby TFF.

In 2023 he played for Ettan newcomers Nordic United FC. Ahead of the 2024 season he changed clubs again, this time to Degerfors IF.

In June 2024, he scored his first goal in the Superettan, six years after making his debut on the second tier. Furthermore the season ended in promotion to the 2025 Allsvenskan. Diaby was thus set to play in Sweden's highest league, eight years after arriving in the country. He also received some attention for wearing a hockey helmet as the Degerfors football team, walking on foot and not on skates, was presented in Nobelhallen; and for receiving two yellow cards in only 4 minutes against IFK Gothenburg in August 2025.

In January 2026 he sustained a slipped disc, sidelining him for the rest of the winter and early spring. He was released in the summer of 2026, but managed to secure a transfer to Spanish club Juventud de Torremolinos CF.
