= Jeppe Corfitzen =

Danish footballer (born 2004)

Personal information
- Date of birth: 29 December 2004 (age 21)
- Place of birth: Denmark
- Height: 1.93 m (6 ft 4 in)
- Position: Winger

Youth career
- Sundby BK
- –2022: Copenhagen
- 2022: Lyngby
- 2022–2024: Lecce

Senior career*
Years	Team	Apps	(Gls)
2023–2025	Lecce	1	(0)

International career^{‡}
2023	Denmark U20	1	(0)
- * Club domestic league appearances and goals as of 25 May 2025 ‡ National team caps and goals as of 8 September 2023

Jeppe Corfitzen (born 29 December 2004) is a Danish footballer who plays as a winger.

== Career ==
In 2022, Corfitzen joined the youth academy of Italian Serie A side Lecce, where he was regarded as one of the club's most important players.

== Style of play ==
Corfitzen mainly operates as a winger and is known for his speed.

== Personal life ==
Corfitzen has been friends with Danish footballer Patrick Dorgu.
