= Ifenna Dorgu =

Danish footballer (born 2006)

Personal information
- Full name: Ifenna Benjamin Dorgu
- Date of birth: 23 August 2006 (age 20)
- Place of birth: Copenhagen, Denmark
- Height: 1.85 m (6 ft 1 in)
- Position: Forward

Team information
- Current team: Torremolinos
- Number: 20

Youth career
- Husum Boldklub
- –2019: Gentofte VI
- 2019–2025: HB Køge
- 2024–2025: → Genoa (loan)

Senior career*
Years	Team	Apps	(Gls)
2023–2026	HB Køge	48	(6)
2024–2025	→ Genoa (loan)	0	(0)
2026	Botev Plovdiv	4	(0)
2026–	Torremolinos	3	(0)
- * Club domestic league appearances and goals as of 21:37, 25 May 2026 (UTC)

Ifenna Dorgu (born 23 August 2006) is a professional footballer who plays as a forward for Torremolinos.

== Early and personal life ==
Dorgu grew up in Husum, a neighbourhood in Copenhagen, Denmark, where he started playing football at local club Husum Boldklub alongside his brothers Patrick and Gabriel. He is of Nigerian descent. He is a Christian.

== Career ==
Later, he moved to Gentofte VI, before joining HB Køge in 2019. He made his professional debut for the team in a cup match against Tårnby FF in August 2023. In the summer of 2024, similar to his brother Patrick, he moved to Italy and joined Genoa on a season long deal, mainly playing for the youth team. He was unused substitute in the league match against Fiorentina on 30 October 2024.

On 8 May 2026 he signed with the Bulgarian club Botev Plovdiv until the summer of 2029. He made his debut for the team in a league match against Cherno More Varna on 9 May 2026.

== Career statistics ==
=== Club ===
As of 14 May 2026

Club performance			League		Cup		Continental		Other		Total	
Club	League	Season	Apps	Goals	Apps	Goals	Apps	Goals	Apps	Goals	Apps	Goals
Bulgaria			League		Bulgarian Cup		Europe		Other		Total	
HB Køge	Danish 1st Division	2023–24	26	4	3	1	–		–		29	5
HB Køge	Danish 1st Division	2024–25	5	0	0	0	–		–		3	0
HB Køge	Danish 1st Division	2025–26	17	2	1	0	–		–		18	2
HB Køge	Total		48	6	3	1	0	0	0	0	51	7
Genoa (loan)	Serie A	2024–25	0	0	0	0	–		–		0	0
Botev Plovdiv	First League	2024–25	2	0	0	0	–		–		2	0
Career statistics			50	6	3	1	0	0	0	0	53	7
