= Ivan Laća =

Croatian footballer

Personal information
- Date of birth: 15 February 2003 (age 23)
- Place of birth: Šibenik, Croatia
- Position: Forward

Team information
- Current team: Juventud Torremolinos
- Number: 24

Youth career
- –2016: SOSK Skradin
- 2016–2019: HNK Šibenik

Senior career*
Years	Team	Apps	(Gls)
2019–2021	HNK Šibenik	22	(0)
2020–2023	Dinamo Zagreb II	25	(3)
2022–2023	→ Rudeš (loan)	22	(4)
2023–25	HNK Šibenik	44	(6)
2025–2026	Enosis Neon Paralimni	9	(1)
2026–	Juventud Torremolinos	3	(1)

International career^{‡}
2019	Croatia U16	1	(0)
- * Club domestic league appearances and goals as of 10 June 2026 ‡ National team caps and goals as of 15 April 2021

Ivan Laća (born 15 February 2003) is a Croatian professional footballer who plays as a forward for Primera Federación club Juventud Torremolinos.

== Club career ==
He made his debut for HNK Šibenik on the 28 September 2019, in a 1-0 2. HNL home win against NK Solin. Under the management Krunoslav Rendulić he helped his side reach promotion to the Croatian First Football League.

He regularly appeared in the first division the following season, struggling to gain some more time however early 2021, as he was reaching the end of its contract next summer.
