= Matías Barboza =

Spanish footballer (born 2002)

Mati Barboza
Personal information
- Full name: Matías Barboza Van Hoec
- Date of birth: 13 February 2002 (age 24)
- Place of birth: Málaga, Spain
- Height: 1.87 m (6 ft 2 in)
- Position: Centre-back

Youth career
- La Mosca
- 2013–2016: Málaga
- 2016–2017: San Félix
- 2017–2019: Málaga
- 2019–2020: San Félix
- 2020–2021: Málaga

Senior career*
Years	Team	Apps	(Gls)
2021–2022	Málaga B	19	(0)
2022–2024	Córdoba B	35	(2)
2024–2026	Córdoba	16	(0)
2025–2026	→ Atlético Madrid B (loan)	18	(0)
- * Club domestic league appearances and goals as of 25 May 2026

Matías "Mati" Barboza Van Hoec (born 13 February 2002) is a Spanish footballer who plays as a centre-back.

== Career ==
Born in Málaga, Andalusia, Barboza joined Málaga CF's youth sides in 2013, aged 11. He made his senior debut with the reserves on 2 May 2021, starting in a 1–0 Tercera División away win over CD Torreperogil.

On 16 June 2021, Barboza renewed his contract with the Albicelestes until 2023. On 15 July of the following year, he signed for Córdoba CF and was assigned to the B-team in Tercera Federación.

Barboza made his first team debut with the Blanquiverdes on 21 January 2024, coming on as a half-time substitute for Carlos García-Die in a 1–1 Primera Federación away draw against Recreativo de Huelva. He renewed his contract until 2025 on 19 February, and finished the campaign with 18 appearances overall as the club achieved promotion to Segunda División.

Barboza made his professional debut on 16 August 2024, replacing José Martínez late into a 1–0 away loss to CD Mirandés. The following 19 July, he was loaned to Atlético Madrileño in the third division, for one year.

Upon returning to the Blanquiverdes, Barboza terminated his link on 10 July 2026.
