= SSD Vigontina Calcio =

Italian football club

Vigontina Calcio
- Full name: Union Vigontina (1995–2006); S.S.D. Vigontina Calcio (2006–2016)
- Founded: 1995
- Dissolved: 2016
- 2015–16: Eccellenza Girone B, 7th
Home colours	Away colours

S.S.D. Vigontina Calcio was an Italian association football club located in Vigonza, Veneto.

== History ==
The team was founded in 1995 as Union Vigontina, after the merger between A.S. Pionca and U.S. Busa. In the 2004–2005 season, played in Serie D. In 2006 it changed its name to S.S.D. Vigontina Calcio.

June 17, 2016 Luparense San Paolo Football Club changes its name in Vigontina San Paolo Football Club moving in Vigonza, forming the main team of the city. The S.S.D. Vigontina Calcio it is integrated in the new team.

== Colours and badge ==
Its colours are blue, red and white.
