= Patrick Dorgu =

Danish footballer (born 2004)

Personal information
- Full name: Patrick Chinazaekpere Dorgu
- Date of birth: 26 October 2004 (age 22)
- Place of birth: Copenhagen, Denmark
- Height: 1.85 m (6 ft 1 in)
- Positions: Full-back; wing-back; winger

Team information
- Current team: Manchester United
- Number: 13

Youth career
- –2016: Husum Boldklub
- 2016–2018: Akademisk Boldklub
- 2018–2022: Nordsjælland
- 2022–2023: Lecce

Senior career*
| Years | Team | Apps | (Gls) |
| 2023–2025 | Lecce | 53 | (5) |
| 2025– | Manchester United | 45 | (5) |

International career^{‡}
| 2022 | Denmark U18 | 2 | (0) |
| 2022–2023 | Denmark U19 | 5 | (2) |
| 2023 | Denmark U20 | 1 | (0) |
| 2023– | Denmark U21 | 7 | (0) |
| 2024– | Denmark | 16 | (4) |
- * Club domestic league appearances and goals as of 20:52, 22 November 2026 (UTC) ‡ National team caps and goals as of 17:45, 27 September 2026 (UTC)

Patrick Chinazaekpere Dorgu (born 26 October 2004) is a Danish professional football player who plays as a full-back, wing-back, or winger for Premier League club Manchester United and the Denmark national team.

Dorgu began his professional career at Lecce in 2023, where he played in two Serie A seasons, before moving to Manchester United in 2025.

Dorgu made his senior international debut for Denmark in 2024, in the UEFA Nations League.

== Early and personal life ==
Dorgu grew up in Husum, a neighbourhood in Copenhagen, Denmark, where he started playing football at local club Husum Boldklub alongside his brothers Ifenna and Gabriel. He is of Nigerian descent. He is a Christian.

== Club career ==
=== Lecce ===
Later, Dorgu was scouted to Nordsjælland's youth academy, before joining Italian club Lecce at under-19 level in July 2022. In February 2023, he extended his contract with Lecce to 2027.

For the 2023–24 season, Dorgu was moved to Lecce's senior squad. He made his debut on 13 August 2023, in a Coppa Italia game against Como. A week later, he made his Serie A debut against Lazio. He scored his first goal on 2 February 2024, in a 3–2 win against Fiorentina.

=== Manchester United ===
On 2 February 2025, Dorgu signed for Premier League club Manchester United on a five-and-a-half-year contract running until 2030, with the option of an additional year, for a reported fee of £25 million. He made his debut five days later, on 7 February, in a 2–1 FA Cup win against Leicester City.

On 26 February 2025, Dorgu made his first Premier League start at Old Trafford against Ipswich Town. However, he was sent off after 43 minutes; with United leading 2–1, he received a straight red card following a challenge on Ipswich's Omari Hutchinson. Ipswich equalised before the break, but United went on to win 3–2. Later that year, on 26 December, he scored his first goal for the club in a 1–0 win over Newcastle United, playing as a right winger. His second goal came on 17 January 2026, against Manchester City to seal a 2–0 derby win at Old Trafford.

In the club's following game against Arsenal, Dorgu scored a long-range half-volley to establish a 2–1 lead for United. The game eventually ended in a 3–2 win after a late Matheus Cunha winning goal.

== International career ==
Born in Denmark, Dorgu is of Nigerian descent. He played youth international football for Denmark at under-18, under-19, under-20 and under-21 levels.

Dorgu was called up to the senior Denmark national team for the first time for the Nations League games against Switzerland and Serbia in September 2024. He debuted on 5 September 2024, against Switzerland at the Parken Stadium. He was brought on in place of Victor Nelsson in the 81st minute and opened the scoring with his very first touch 42 seconds later. The game ended in a 2–0 victory for Denmark.

== Representation ==
Dorgu is represented by Nigerian football agent Kingsley Ogbodo, founder and CEO of OUS Group, who has been referenced in media reports regarding transfer interest in the player from several European clubs.

== Style of play ==
Dorgu is a versatile left-footed player who can play as a full-back, wing-back, or winger on both the left and right sides of the pitch.

== Career statistics ==
=== Club ===
As of match played 22 November 2026

Appearances and goals by club, season and competition
| Club | Season | League | | | National cup (Note: Includes Coppa Italia, FA Cup) | | League cup (Note: Includes EFL Cup) | | Europe | | Total | |
| Club | Season | Division | Apps | Goals | Apps | Goals | Apps | Goals | Apps | Goals | Apps | Goals |
|---|---|---|---|---|---|---|---|---|---|---|---|---|
| Lecce | 2023–24 | Serie A | 32 | 2 | 2 | 0 | — | | — | | 34 | 2 |
| Lecce | 2024–25 | Serie A | 21 | 3 | 2 | 0 | — | | — | | 23 | 3 |
| Lecce | Total | | 53 | 5 | 4 | 0 | — | | — | | 57 | 5 |
| Manchester United | 2024–25 | Premier League | 12 | 0 | 1 | 0 | — | | 7 (Note: Appearances in UEFA Europa League) | 0 | 20 | 0 |
| Manchester United | 2025–26 | Premier League | 26 | 4 | 1 | 0 | 1 | 0 | — | | 28 | 4 |
| Manchester United | 2026–27 | Premier League | 7 | 1 | 0 | 0 | 0 | 0 | 1 (Note: Appearance in UEFA Champions League) | 0 | 8 | 1 |
| Manchester United | Total | | 45 | 5 | 2 | 0 | 1 | 0 | 8 | 0 | 56 | 5 |
| Career total | | | 98 | 10 | 6 | 0 | 1 | 0 | 8 | 0 | 113 | 10 |

=== International ===
As of match played 27 September 2026

Appearances and goals by national team and year
| National team | Year | Apps | Goals |
|---|---|---|---|
| Denmark | 2024 | 4 | 1 |
| Denmark | 2025 | 8 | 2 |
| Denmark | 2026 | 4 | 1 |
| Total | | 16 | 4 |

Scores and results list Denmark's goal tally first.

List of international goals scored by Patrick Dorgu
| No. | Date | Venue | Cap | Opponent | Score | Result | Competition |
|---|---|---|---|---|---|---|---|
| 1 | 5 September 2024 | Parken Stadium, Copenhagen, Denmark | 1 | Switzerland | 1–0 | 2–0 | 2024–25 UEFA Nations League A |
| 2 | 9 October 2025 | ZTE Arena, Zalaegerszeg, Hungary | 9 | Belarus | 4–0 | 6–0 | 2026 FIFA World Cup qualification |
| 3 | 18 November 2025 | Hampden Park, Glasgow, Scotland | 12 | Scotland | 2–2 | 2–4 | 2026 FIFA World Cup qualification |
| 4 | 7 June 2026 | Odense Stadium, Odense, Denmark | 14 | Ukraine | 1–0 | 2–1 (Note: Denmark's friendly match against Ukraine was abandoned after 65 minutes with Denmark leading 2–1, due to Danish midfielder Christian Eriksen collapsing on the pitch.) | Friendly |

== Honours ==
Individual

- Manchester United Goal of the Season: 2025–26 (vs. Arsenal, 25 January 2026)
